= 1988 Big Ten Conference football season =

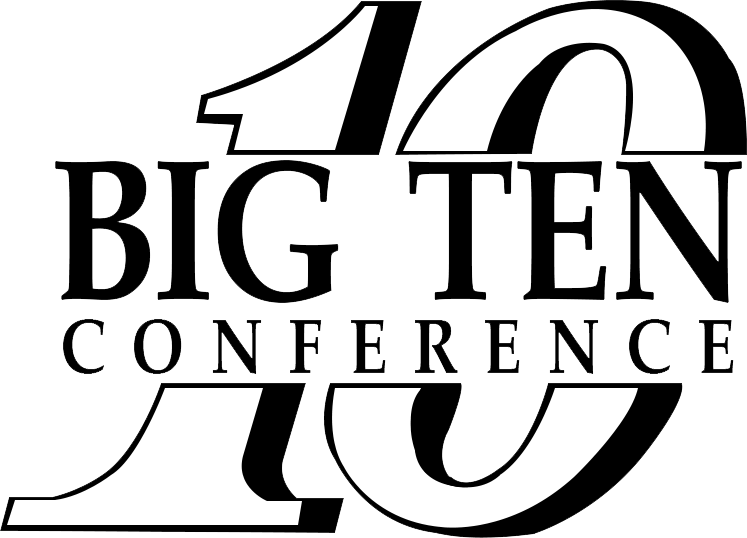
- League: NCAA Division I-A
- Sport: Football
- Teams: 10
- Champions: Michigan

Football seasons

1988 Big Ten Conference football standings
	Conf.					Overall
Team	W		L		T	W		L		T
No. 4 Michigan $	7	–	0	–	1	9	–	2	–	1
Michigan State	6	–	1	–	1	6	–	5	–	1
Illinois	5	–	2	–	1	6	–	5	–	1
Iowa	4	–	1	–	3	6	–	4	–	3
No. 20 Indiana	5	–	3	–	0	8	–	3	–	1
Purdue	3	–	5	–	0	4	–	7	–	0
Ohio State	2	–	5	–	1	4	–	6	–	1
Northwestern	2	–	5	–	1	2	–	8	–	1
Wisconsin	1	–	7	–	0	1	–	10	–	0
Minnesota	0	–	6	–	2	2	–	7	–	2
$ – Conference champion; Rankings from AP Poll

The 1988 Big Ten Conference football season was the 93rd season of college football played by the member schools of the Big Ten Conference and was a part of the 1988 NCAA Division I-A football season.

== Regular season ==
The No. 4 Michigan Wolverines won the 1988 Big Ten championship with a 7-0-1 conference mark (tying Iowa) and a trip to play USC in the Rose Bowl, winning that game 22-14.

Michigan State came in second at 6-1-1 (6-5-1 overall), also tying Iowa. Illinois finished third at 5-2-1 (6-5-1 overall), tying Minnesota.

Iowa came in fourth with a 4-1-3 conference record, with their third tie coming against Ohio State. No. 20 Indiana finished in fifth place at 5-3 (8-3-1 overall).

Purdue was sixth at 3-5 (4-7 overall), while Ohio State and Northwestern tied for seventh place with 2-5-1 Big Ten records. Northwestern played Minnesota to a second tied game.

Wisconsin came in ninth place at 1-7 (1-10 overall) while Minnesota posted an 0-6-2 conference mark (2-7-2 overall).

With tie games being eliminated for the 1995 season's bowl games, the 1988 Big Ten season remains the most recent year that the conference had three or more league games end in a tie:

- Oct. 1: Iowa 10, Michigan State 10 (at Spartan Stadium)
- Oct. 8: Northwestern 28, Minnesota 28 (at the Metrodome)
- Oct. 15: Michigan 15, Iowa 15 (at Kinnick Stadium)
- Oct. 29: Illinois 27, Minnesota 27 (at the Metrodome)
- Nov. 12: Ohio State 24, Iowa 24 (at Kinnick Stadium)

== Bowl games ==
Five Big Ten teams played in bowl games, with the conference going 2-3 overall:

- Rose Bowl: No. 11 Michigan 22, No. 5 USC 14
- Gator Bowl: No. 19 Georgia 34, Michigan State 27
- Peach Bowl: NC State 28, Iowa 23
- All-American Bowl: Florida 14, Illinois 10
- Liberty Bowl: Indiana 34, South Carolina 10
