= Big Ten Conference football individual awards =

List of Big Ten Conference football awards

Coaches and media of the Big Ten Conference award the following individual honors at the end of each football season. In addition, the Chicago Tribune awards the Chicago Tribune Silver Football to the most valuable football player of the conference.

== General ==
=== Player of the Year ===
Sanctioned by Associated Press (AP) and United Press International (UPI); replaced with separate offensive and defensive selections in 1990.

| Season | Player | Pos. | Team |
|---|---|---|---|
| 1982 | Anthony Carter | WR | Michigan |
| 1983 | Don Thorp | DT | Illinois |
| 1984 | Keith Byars | RB | Ohio State |
| 1985 | Chuck Long | QB | Iowa |
| 1985 | Lorenzo White | RB | Michigan State |
| 1986 | Jim Harbaugh | QB | Michigan |
| 1987 | Lorenzo White (2) | RB | Michigan State |
| 1987 | Ernie Jones | WR | Indiana |
| 1988 | Anthony Thompson | RB | Indiana |
| 1989 | Anthony Thompson (2) | RB | Indiana |

=== Graham–George Offensive Player of the Year ===
Selected by coaches and media. In 2011, the award was renamed the Graham–George Offensive Player of the Year Award in honor of Northwestern halfback Otto Graham and Ohio State running back Eddie George.

| Season | Player | Pos. | Team | Ref. |
|---|---|---|---|---|
| 1990 | Nick Bell (Note: Selected by coaches) | RB | Iowa | |
| 1990 | Matt Rodgers | QB | Iowa | |
| 1990 | Jon Vaughn | RB | Michigan | |
| 1990 | Tico Duckett (Note: Selected by media) | RB | Michigan State | |
| 1991 | Desmond Howard | WR | Michigan | |
| 1992 | Tyrone Wheatley | RB | Michigan | |
| 1993 | Brent Moss | RB | Wisconsin | |
| 1994 | Kerry Collins | QB | Penn State | |
| 1995 | Eddie George | RB | Ohio State | |
| 1996 | Orlando Pace | OT | Ohio State | |
| 1997 | Curtis Enis | RB | Penn State | |
| 1997 | Tavian Banks | RB | Iowa | |
| 1998 | Joe Germaine | QB | Ohio State | |
| 1998 | Drew Brees | QB | Purdue | |
| 1999 | Ron Dayne | RB | Wisconsin | |
| 2000 | Drew Brees (2) | QB | Purdue | |
| 2001 | Antwaan Randle El | QB | Indiana | |
| 2002 | Brad Banks | QB | Iowa | |
| 2003 | Chris Perry | RB | Michigan | |
| 2004 | Braylon Edwards | WR | Michigan | |
| 2005 | Michael Robinson | QB | Penn State | |
| 2005 | Brett Basanez | QB | Northwestern | |
| 2006 | Troy Smith | QB | Ohio State | |
| 2007 | Rashard Mendenhall | RB | Illinois | |
| 2008 | Shonn Greene | RB | Iowa | |
| 2009 | John Clay | RB | Wisconsin | |
| 2010 | Denard Robinson | QB | Michigan | |
Award renamed
| 2011 | Montee Ball | RB | Wisconsin | |
| 2012 | Braxton Miller | QB | Ohio State | |
| 2013 | Braxton Miller (2) | QB | Ohio State | |
| 2014 | Melvin Gordon | RB | Wisconsin | |
| 2015 | Ezekiel Elliott | RB | Ohio State | |
| 2016 | Saquon Barkley | RB | Penn State | |
| 2017 | Saquon Barkley (2) | RB | Penn State | |
| 2018 | Dwayne Haskins | QB | Ohio State | |
| 2019 | Justin Fields | QB | Ohio State | |
| 2020 | Justin Fields (2) | QB | Ohio State | |
| 2021 | C. J. Stroud | QB | Ohio State | |
| 2022 | C. J. Stroud (2) | QB | Ohio State | |
| 2023 | Marvin Harrison Jr. | WR | Ohio State | |
| 2024 | Dillon Gabriel | QB | Oregon | |
| 2025 | Fernando Mendoza | QB | Indiana | |

=== Nagurski–Woodson Defensive Player of the Year ===
Selected by coaches and media. In 2011, the award was renamed the Nagurski–Woodson Award in honor of Minnesota tackle Bronko Nagurski and Michigan cornerback Charles Woodson.

| Season | Player | Pos. | Team | Ref. |
|---|---|---|---|---|
| 1990 | Moe Gardner | NT | Illinois | |
| 1990 | Darrick Brownlow | LB | Illinois | |
| 1991 | Leroy Smith | DE | Iowa | |
| 1991 | Troy Vincent | CB | Wisconsin | |
| 1992 | Steve Tovar | LB | Ohio State | |
| 1992 | Jeff Zgonina | DT | Purdue | |
| 1993 | Dana Howard | LB | Illinois | |
| 1993 | Dan Wilkinson | DT | Ohio State | |
| 1994 | Dana Howard (2) | LB | Illinois | |
| 1995 | Pat Fitzgerald | LB | Northwestern | |
| 1996 | Shawn Springs | CB | Ohio State | |
| 1996 | Pat Fitzgerald (2) | LB | Northwestern | |
| 1997 | Charles Woodson | CB | Michigan | |
| 1998 | LaVar Arrington | LB | Penn State | |
| 1998 | Tom Burke | DE | Wisconsin | |
| 1999 | Courtney Brown | DE | Penn State | |
| 2000 | Jamar Fletcher | CB | Wisconsin | |
| 2001 | Larry Foote | LB | Michigan | |
| 2002 | Mike Doss | S | Ohio State | |
| 2002 | Michael Haynes | DE | Penn State | |
| 2003 | Will Smith | DE | Ohio State | |
| 2004 | Erasmus James | DE | Wisconsin | |
| 2005 | A. J. Hawk | LB | Ohio State | |
| 2006 | LaMarr Woodley | DE | Michigan | |
| 2007 | James Laurinaitis | LB | Ohio State | |
| 2008 | James Laurinaitis (2) | LB | Ohio State | |
| 2009 | Jared Odrick | DT | Penn State | |
| 2009 | Greg Jones | LB | Michigan State | |
| 2010 | Ryan Kerrigan | DE | Purdue | |
Award renamed
| 2011 | Devon Still | DT | Penn State | |
| 2012 | John Simon | DE | Ohio State | |
| 2013 | Chris Borland | LB | Wisconsin | |
| 2014 | Joey Bosa | DE | Ohio State | |
| 2015 | Carl Nassib | DE | Penn State | |
| 2016 | Jabrill Peppers | LB | Michigan | |
| 2017 | Josey Jewell | LB | Iowa | |
| 2018 | Devin Bush Jr. | LB | Michigan | |
| 2019 | Chase Young | DE | Ohio State | |
| 2020 | Daviyon Nixon | DT | Iowa | |
| 2021 | Aidan Hutchinson | DE | Michigan | |
| 2022 | Jack Campbell | LB | Iowa | |
| 2023 | Johnny Newton | DT | Illinois | |
| 2024 | Abdul Carter | DE | Penn State | |
| 2025 | Caleb Downs | S | Ohio State | |

=== Thompson–Randle El Freshman of the Year ===
Selected by coaches and media. In 2011, the award was renamed the Thompson–Randle El Freshman of the Year Award in honor of Minnesota running back Darrell Thompson and Indiana quarterback Antwaan Randle El.

| Season | Player | Pos. | Team | Ref. |
|---|---|---|---|---|
| 1986 | Darrell Thompson | RB | Minnesota | |
| 1987 | Tony Lowery | QB | Wisconsin | |
| 1988 | Brian Fox | QB | Purdue | |
| 1988 | Ed Sutter | LB/P | Northwestern | |
| 1989 | Eric Hunter | QB | Purdue | |
| 1990 | Robert Smith | RB | Ohio State | |
| 1991 | Corey Rogers | RB | Purdue | |
| 1992 | Korey Stringer | OT | Ohio State | |
| 1992 | Simeon Rice | DE | Illinois | |
| 1993 | Reggie Garnett | LB | Michigan State | |
| 1994 | Orlando Pace | OT | Ohio State | |
| 1995 | Charles Woodson | CB | Michigan | |
| 1995 | Curtis Enis | RB | Penn State | |
| 1996 | Ron Dayne | RB | Wisconsin | |
| 1996 | Andy Katzenmoyer | LB | Ohio State | |
| 1997 | Anthony Thomas | RB | Michigan | |
| 1998 | Antwaan Randle El | QB | Indiana | |
| 1999 | Brooks Bollinger | QB | Wisconsin | |
| 2000 | Stuart Schweigert | S | Purdue | |
| 2001 | Anthony Davis | RB | Wisconsin | |
| 2002 | Maurice Clarett | RB | Ohio State | |
| 2003 | Steve Breaston | WR | Michigan | |
| 2003 | Laurence Maroney | RB | Minnesota | |
| 2004 | Mike Hart | RB | Michigan | |
| 2005 | Tyrell Sutton | RB | Northwestern | |
| 2006 | P. J. Hill | RB | Wisconsin | |
| 2007 | Arrelious Benn | WR | Illinois | |
| 2008 | Terrelle Pryor | QB | Ohio State | |
| 2009 | Chris Borland | LB | Wisconsin | |
| 2010 | James White | RB | Wisconsin | |
Award renamed
| 2011 | Braxton Miller | QB | Ohio State | |
| 2012 | Deion Barnes | DE | Penn State | |
| 2013 | Christian Hackenberg | QB | Penn State | |
| 2014 | J. T. Barrett | QB | Ohio State | |
| 2015 | Jabrill Peppers | S/RB | Michigan | |
| 2016 | Mike Weber | RB | Ohio State | |
| 2017 | Jonathan Taylor | RB | Wisconsin | |
| 2018 | Rondale Moore | WR | Purdue | |
| 2019 | David Bell | WR | Purdue | |
| 2020 | Brandon Joseph | S | Northwestern | |
| 2021 | C. J. Stroud | QB | Ohio State | |
| 2022 | Nicholas Singleton | RB | Penn State | |
| 2023 | Dillon Thieneman | S | Purdue | |
| 2024 | Jeremiah Smith | WR | Ohio State | |
| 2025 | Julian Sayin | QB | Ohio State | |

=== Dave McClain / Hayes–Schembechler Coach of the Year ===
From 1986 through 2010, this award was dedicated in honor of Dave McClain, who served as the Wisconsin Badgers head coach from 1978 to 1985. Recipients were selected by the media. The coaches selected a separate award from 1982 to 1991. When the coaches resumed selecting a coach of the year in 2011, it was named for the first two recipients of the Big Ten Coach of the year, Bo Schembechler and Woody Hayes, as the Hayes–Schembechler coach of the year.

| Season | Coach | Team | Ref. |
|---|---|---|---|
Big Ten Coach of the Year
| 1972 | Bo Schembechler | Michigan | |
| 1973 | Woody Hayes | Ohio State | |
| 1974 | Denny Stolz | Michigan State | |
| 1975 | Woody Hayes (2) | Ohio State | |
| 1976 | Bo Schembechler (2) | Michigan | |
| 1977 | Darryl Rogers | Michigan State | |
| 1978 | Jim Young | Purdue | |
| 1979 | Earle Bruce | Ohio State | |
| 1980 | Bo Schembechler (3) | Michigan | |
| 1981 | Hayden Fry | Iowa | |
| 1982 | Bo Schembechler (4) | Michigan | |
| 1982 | Dennis Green | Northwestern | |
| 1983 | Mike White | Illinois | |
| 1984 | Leon Burtnett | Purdue | |
| 1985 | Bo Schembechler (5) | Michigan | |
Dave McClain Coach of the Year
| 1986 | Bill Mallory | Indiana | |
| 1987 | George Perles | Michigan State | |
| 1987 | Bill Mallory (2) | Indiana | |
| 1988 | John Mackovic | Illinois | |
| 1989 | Bo Schembechler (6) | Michigan | |
| 1989 | John Mackovic (2) | Illinois | |
| 1990 | Hayden Fry (2) | Iowa | |
| 1991 | Hayden Fry (3) | Iowa | |
| 1991 | Gary Moeller | Michigan | |
| 1992 | Gary Moeller (2) | Michigan | |
| 1993 | Barry Alvarez | Wisconsin | |
| 1994 | Joe Paterno | Penn State | |
| 1995 | Gary Barnett | Northwestern | |
| 1996 | Gary Barnett (2) | Northwestern | |
| 1997 | Joe Tiller | Purdue | |
| 1998 | Barry Alvarez (2) | Wisconsin | |
| 1999 | Glen Mason | Minnesota | |
| 2000 | Randy Walker | Northwestern | |
| 2001 | Ron Turner | Illinois | |
| 2002 | Kirk Ferentz | Iowa | |
| 2003 | John L. Smith | Michigan State | |
| 2004 | Kirk Ferentz (2) | Iowa | |
| 2005 | Joe Paterno (2) | Penn State | |
| 2006 | Bret Bielema | Wisconsin | |
| 2007 | Ron Zook | Illinois | |
| 2008 | Joe Paterno (3) | Penn State | |
| 2009 | Kirk Ferentz (3) | Iowa | |
| 2010 | Mark Dantonio | Michigan State | |
Hayes–Schembechler Coach of the Year
| 2011 | Brady Hoke | Michigan | |
| 2012 | Bill O'Brien | Penn State | |
| 2013 | Mark Dantonio (2) | Michigan State | |
| 2014 | Jerry Kill | Minnesota | |
| 2015 | Kirk Ferentz (4) | Iowa | |
| 2016 | Paul Chryst | Wisconsin | |
| 2016 | James Franklin | Penn State | |
| 2017 | Paul Chryst (2) | Wisconsin | |
| 2018 | Pat Fitzgerald | Northwestern | |
| 2019 | P. J. Fleck | Minnesota | |
| 2019 | Ryan Day | Ohio State | |
| 2020 | Tom Allen | Indiana | |
| 2021 | Mel Tucker | Michigan State | |
| 2022 | Jim Harbaugh | Michigan | |
| 2023 | David Braun | Northwestern | |
| 2024 | Curt Cignetti | Indiana | |
| 2025 | Curt Cignetti (2) | Indiana | |

=== Ford–Kinnick Leadership Award ===
The award is named in honor of Michigan center Gerald Ford and Iowa halfback Nile Kinnick.

| Season | Player | Pos. | Team | Tenure | Ref. |
|---|---|---|---|---|---|
| 2011 | Archie Griffin | RB | Ohio State | 1972–1975 | |
| 2012 | Jon Runyan | OT | Michigan | 1992–1995 | |
| 2013 | Gene Washington | WR | Michigan State | 1964–1966 | |
| 2014 | Mike Hopkins | S | Illinois | 1987–1991 | |
| 2015 | Brian Griese | QB | Michigan | 1993–1997 | |
| 2016 | Reggie McKenzie | G | Michigan | 1969–1971 | |
| 2017 | Troy Vincent | CB | Wisconsin | 1988–1991 | |
| 2018 | Antwaan Randle El | QB | Indiana | 1997–2001 | |
| 2019 | Doug Schlereth | DE | Indiana | 1985–1988 | |
| 2020 | Napoleon Harris | LB/DE | Northwestern | 1998–2001 | |
| 2021 | Pat Richter | E | Wisconsin | 1960–1962 | |
| 2022 | Ron Guenther | G | Illinois | 1965–1966 | |
| 2023 | Richard Coachys | QB/S | Indiana | 1965–1966 | |
| 2024 | Russell Wilson | QB | Wisconsin | 2011 | |
| 2025 | Jack Campbell | LB | Iowa | 2019–2022 | |

=== Dungy–Thompson Humanitarian Award ===
The award is named in honor of Minnesota quarterback Tony Dungy and Indiana running back Anthony Thompson.

| Season | Player | Pos. | Team | Tenure | Ref. |
|---|---|---|---|---|---|
| 2011 | George Taliaferro | HB | Indiana | 1945, 1947–1948 | |
| 2012 | Chris Spielman | LB | Ohio State | 1984–1987 | |
| 2013 | Drew Brees | QB | Purdue | 1997–2000 | |
| 2014 | Brian Griese | QB | Michigan | 1993–1997 | |
| 2015 | John Shinsky | DT | Michigan State | 1970–1973 | |
| 2016 | Trent Green | QB | Indiana | 1988–1992 | |
| 2017 | Chad Greenway | LB | Iowa | 2001–2005 | |
| 2018 | Jake Wood | OT | Wisconsin | 2001–2004 | |
| 2019 | J. J. Watt | DE | Wisconsin | 2008–2010 | |
| 2020 | Vincent Smith | RB | Michigan | 2009–2012 | |
| 2021 | Malcolm Jenkins | S/NB | Ohio State | 2005–2008 | |
| 2022 | Nate Sudfeld | QB | Indiana | 2012–2015 | |
| 2023 | Dick Butkus | C/LB | Illinois | 1962–1964 | |
| 2024 | Madieu Williams | S | Maryland | 2001–2003 | |
| 2025 | Will Shields | G | Nebraska | 1989–1992 | |

== Offensive ==
=== Griese–Brees Quarterback of the Year ===
Award started in 2011, named in honor of Purdue's Bob Griese and Drew Brees.

| Season | Player | Team | Ref. |
|---|---|---|---|
| 2011 | Russell Wilson | Wisconsin | |
| 2012 | Braxton Miller | Ohio State | |
| 2013 | Braxton Miller (2) | Ohio State | |
| 2014 | J. T. Barrett | Ohio State | |
| 2015 | Connor Cook | Michigan State | |
| 2016 | J. T. Barrett (2) | Ohio State | |
| 2017 | J. T. Barrett (3) | Ohio State | |
| 2018 | Dwayne Haskins | Ohio State | |
| 2019 | Justin Fields | Ohio State | |
| 2020 | Justin Fields (2) | Ohio State | |
| 2021 | C. J. Stroud | Ohio State | |
| 2022 | C. J. Stroud (2) | Ohio State | |
| 2023 | J. J. McCarthy | Michigan | |
| 2024 | Dillon Gabriel | Oregon | |
| 2025 | Fernando Mendoza | Indiana | |

=== Ameche–Dayne Running Back of the Year ===
Award started in 2011, named in honor of Wisconsin's Alan Ameche and Ron Dayne.

| Season | Player | Team | Ref. |
|---|---|---|---|
| 2011 | Montee Ball | Wisconsin | |
| 2012 | Montee Ball (2) | Wisconsin | |
| 2013 | Carlos Hyde | Ohio State | |
| 2014 | Melvin Gordon | Wisconsin | |
| 2015 | Ezekiel Elliott | Ohio State | |
| 2016 | Saquon Barkley | Penn State | |
| 2017 | Saquon Barkley (2) | Penn State | |
| 2018 | Jonathan Taylor | Wisconsin | |
| 2019 | Jonathan Taylor (2) | Wisconsin | |
| 2020 | Mohamed Ibrahim | Minnesota | |
| 2021 | Kenneth Walker III | Michigan State | |
| 2022 | Blake Corum | Michigan | |
| 2023 | Blake Corum (2) | Michigan | |
| 2024 | Kaleb Johnson | Iowa | |
| 2025 | Emmett Johnson | Nebraska | |

=== Richter–Howard Receiver of the Year ===
Award began in 2011 and is named in honor of Wisconsin's Pat Richter and Michigan's Desmond Howard.

| Season | Player | Team | Ref. |
|---|---|---|---|
| 2011 | Marvin McNutt | Iowa | |
| 2012 | Allen Robinson | Penn State | |
| 2013 | Allen Robinson (2) | Penn State | |
| 2014 | Tony Lippett | Michigan State | |
| 2015 | Aaron Burbridge | Michigan State | |
| 2016 | Austin Carr | Northwestern | |
| 2017 | D. J. Moore | Maryland | |
| 2018 | Rondale Moore | Purdue | |
| 2019 | Rashod Bateman | Minnesota | |
| 2020 | Ty Fryfogle | Indiana | |
| 2021 | David Bell | Purdue | |
| 2022 | Marvin Harrison Jr. | Ohio State | |
| 2023 | Marvin Harrison Jr. (2) | Ohio State | |
| 2024 | Jeremiah Smith | Ohio State | |
| 2025 | Jeremiah Smith (2) | Ohio State | |

=== Kwalick–Clark Tight End of the Year ===
Award began in 2011 and is named in honor of Penn State's Ted Kwalick and Iowa's Dallas Clark.

| Season | Player | Team | Ref. |
|---|---|---|---|
| 2011 | Drake Dunsmore | Northwestern | |
| 2012 | Jacob Pedersen | Wisconsin | |
| 2013 | Devin Funchess | Michigan | |
| 2014 | Maxx Williams | Minnesota | |
| 2015 | Jake Butt | Michigan | |
| 2016 | Jake Butt (2) | Michigan | |
| 2017 | Troy Fumagalli | Wisconsin | |
| 2018 | T. J. Hockenson | Iowa | |
| 2019 | Brycen Hopkins | Purdue | |
| 2020 | Pat Freiermuth | Penn State | |
| 2021 | Austin Allen | Nebraska | |
| 2022 | Sam LaPorta | Iowa | |
| 2023 | Cade Stover | Ohio State | |
| 2024 | Tyler Warren | Penn State | |
| 2025 | Kenyon Sadiq | Oregon | |

=== Rimington–Pace Offensive Lineman of the Year ===
Selected by Big Ten radio broadcasters until 1991; selected by coaches since. In 2011, the award was renamed the Rimington–Pace Offensive Lineman of the Year Award, in honor of Nebraska center Dave Rimington and Ohio State offensive tackle Orlando Pace.

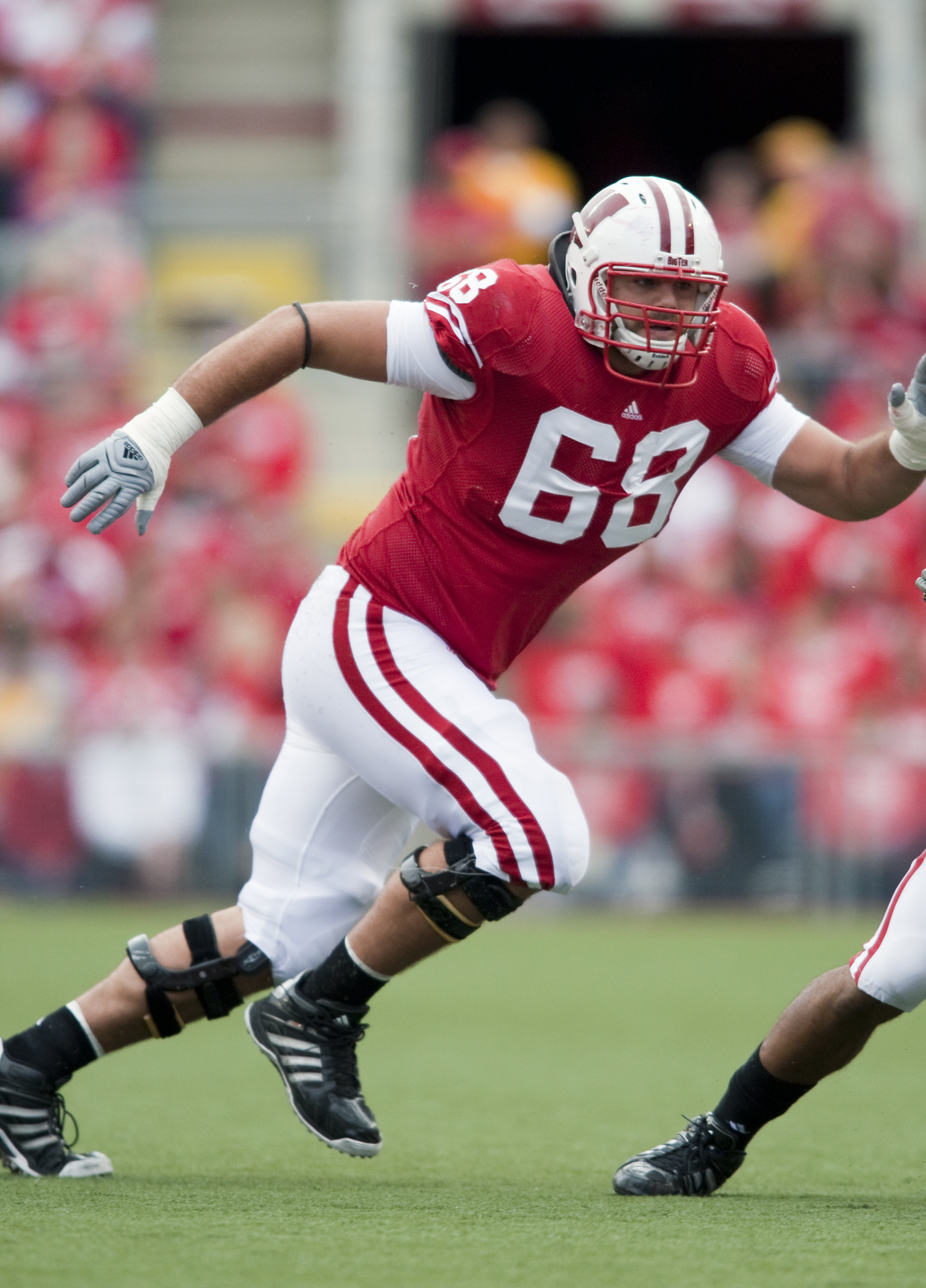
2010 winner Gabe Carimi

| Season | Player | Pos. | Team | Ref. |
|---|---|---|---|---|
| 1984 | Jeff Dellenbach | G | Wisconsin | |
| 1985 | Mike Haight | OT | Iowa | |
| 1986 | Dave Croston | G | Iowa | |
| 1987 | Tony Mandarich | OT | Michigan State | |
| 1988 | Tony Mandarich (2) | OT | Michigan State | |
| 1989 | Bob Kula | OT | Michigan State | |
| 1990 | Not awarded | | | |
| 1991 | Greg Skrepenak | OT | Michigan | |
| 1992 | Mike Devlin | C | Iowa | |
| 1993 | Korey Stringer | OT | Ohio State | |
| 1994 | Korey Stringer (2) | OT | Ohio State | |
| 1995 | Orlando Pace | OT | Ohio State | |
| 1996 | Orlando Pace (2) | OT | Ohio State | |
| 1997 | Flozell Adams | OT | Michigan State | |
| 1998 | Jon Jansen | OT | Michigan | |
| 1999 | Chris McIntosh | OT | Wisconsin | |
| 2000 | Steve Hutchinson | G | Michigan | |
| 2001 | LeCharles Bentley | C | Ohio State | |
| 2002 | Eric Steinbach | G | Iowa | |
| 2003 | Robert Gallery | OT | Iowa | |
| 2004 | David Baas | C | Michigan | |
| 2005 | Greg Eslinger | C | Minnesota | |
| 2006 | Jake Long | OT | Michigan | |
| 2007 | Jake Long (2) | OT | Michigan | |
| 2008 | A. Q. Shipley | C | Penn State | |
| 2009 | Bryan Bulaga | OT | Iowa | |
| 2010 | Gabe Carimi | OT | Wisconsin | |
Award renamed
| 2011 | David Molk | C | Michigan | |
| 2012 | Taylor Lewan | OT | Michigan | |
| 2013 | Taylor Lewan (2) | OT | Michigan | |
| 2014 | Brandon Scherff | OT | Iowa | |
| 2015 | Taylor Decker | OT | Ohio State | |
| 2016 | Pat Elflein | C | Ohio State | |
| 2017 | Billy Price | C | Ohio State | |
| 2018 | Michael Deiter | G | Wisconsin | |
| 2019 | Tristan Wirfs | OT | Iowa | |
| 2020 | Wyatt Davis | G | Ohio State | |
| 2021 | Tyler Linderbaum | C | Iowa | |
| 2022 | Peter Skoronski | OT | Northwestern | |
| 2023 | Olu Fashanu | OT | Penn State | |
| 2024 | Aireontae Ersery | OT | Minnesota | |
| 2025 | Carter Smith | OT | Indiana | |

== Defensive ==
=== Smith–Brown Defensive Lineman of the Year ===
Selected by Big Ten radio broadcasters until 1991; selected by coaches since. In 2011, the award was renamed the Smith–Brown Defensive Lineman of the Year Award in honor of Michigan State defensive end Bubba Smith and Penn State defensive end Courtney Brown.

| Season | Player | Pos. | Team | Ref. |
|---|---|---|---|---|
| 1984 | Paul Hufford | DT | Iowa | |
| 1985 | Mike Hammerstein | DT | Michigan | |
| 1986 | Eric Kumerow | DE | Ohio State | |
| 1987 | Dave Haight | NT | Iowa | |
| 1988 | Mark Messner | DT | Michigan | |
| 1989 | Moe Gardner | NT | Illinois | |
| 1990 | Not awarded | | | |
| 1991 | Leroy Smith | DE | Iowa | |
| 1992 | Chris Hutchinson | DT | Michigan | |
| 1993 | Dan Wilkinson | DT | Ohio State | |
| 1994 | Simeon Rice | DE | Illinois | |
| 1995 | Mike Vrabel | DE | Ohio State | |
| 1996 | Mike Vrabel (2) | DE | Ohio State | |
| 1997 | Jared DeVries | DE | Iowa | |
| 1998 | Tom Burke | DE | Wisconsin | |
| 1999 | Courtney Brown | DE | Penn State | |
| 2000 | Wendell Bryant | DT | Wisconsin | |
| 2000 | Karon Riley | DE | Minnesota | |
| 2001 | Wendell Bryant (2) | DT | Wisconsin | |
| 2002 | Jimmy Kennedy | DT | Penn State | |
| 2003 | Will Smith | DE | Ohio State | |
| 2004 | Erasmus James | DE | Wisconsin | |
| 2005 | Tamba Hali | DE | Penn State | |
| 2006 | LaMarr Woodley | DE | Michigan | |
| 2007 | Vernon Gholston | DE | Ohio State | |
| 2008 | Mitch King | DT | Iowa | |
| 2009 | Jared Odrick | DT | Penn State | |
| 2010 | Ryan Kerrigan | DE | Purdue | |
Award renamed
| 2011 | Devon Still | DT | Penn State | |
| 2012 | John Simon | DE | Ohio State | |
| 2013 | Shilique Calhoun | DE | Michigan State | |
| 2014 | Joey Bosa | DE | Ohio State | |
| 2015 | Joey Bosa (2) | DE | Ohio State | |
| 2016 | Tyquan Lewis | DE | Ohio State | |
| 2017 | Nick Bosa | DE | Ohio State | |
| 2018 | Kenny Willekes | DE | Michigan State | |
| 2019 | Chase Young | DE | Ohio State | |
| 2020 | Daviyon Nixon | DT | Iowa | |
| 2021 | Aidan Hutchinson | DE | Michigan | |
| 2022 | Mike Morris | DE | Michigan | |
| 2023 | Johnny Newton | DT | Illinois | |
| 2024 | Abdul Carter | DE | Penn State | |
| 2025 | Kayden McDonald | DT | Ohio State | |

=== Butkus–Fitzgerald Linebacker of the Year ===
Award started in 2011, named in honor of Illinois' Dick Butkus and Northwestern's Pat Fitzgerald.

| Season | Player | Team | Ref. |
|---|---|---|---|
| 2011 | Lavonte David | Nebraska | |
| 2012 | Michael Mauti | Penn State | |
| 2013 | Chris Borland | Wisconsin | |
| 2014 | Mike Hull | Penn State | |
| 2015 | Joe Schobert | Wisconsin | |
| 2016 | Jabrill Peppers | Michigan | |
| 2017 | Josey Jewell | Iowa | |
| 2018 | Devin Bush Jr. | Michigan | |
| 2019 | Micah Parsons | Penn State | |
| 2020 | Paddy Fisher | Northwestern | |
| 2021 | Leo Chenal | Wisconsin | |
| 2022 | Jack Campbell | Iowa | |
| 2023 | Tommy Eichenberg | Ohio State | |
| 2024 | Jay Higgins | Iowa | |
| 2025 | Arvell Reese | Ohio State | |

=== Tatum–Woodson Defensive Back of the Year ===
Award started in 2011, named in honor of Ohio State safety Jack Tatum and Purdue cornerback Rod Woodson.

| Season | Player | Pos. | Team | Ref. |
|---|---|---|---|---|
| 2011 | Alfonzo Dennard | CB | Nebraska | |
| 2012 | Micah Hyde | CB | Iowa | |
| 2013 | Darqueze Dennard | CB | Michigan State | |
| 2014 | Kurtis Drummond | S | Michigan State | |
| 2015 | Desmond King | CB | Iowa | |
| 2016 | Jourdan Lewis | CB | Michigan | |
| 2017 | Josh Jackson | CB | Iowa | |
| 2018 | Amani Hooker | S | Iowa | |
| 2019 | Antoine Winfield Jr. | S | Minnesota | |
| 2020 | Shaun Wade | CB | Ohio State | |
| 2021 | Riley Moss | CB | Iowa | |
| 2022 | Devon Witherspoon | CB | Illinois | |
| 2023 | Cooper DeJean | CB | Iowa | |
| 2024 | Caleb Downs | S | Ohio State | |
| 2025 | Caleb Downs (2) | S | Ohio State | |

== Special teams ==
=== Bakken–Andersen Kicker of the Year ===
Named in honor of Wisconsin's Jim Bakken and Michigan State's Morten Andersen.

| Season | Player | Team | Ref. |
|---|---|---|---|
| 2011 | Brett Maher | Nebraska | |
| 2012 | Brett Maher (2) | Nebraska | |
| 2012 | Jeff Budzien | Northwestern | |
| 2013 | Jeff Budzien (2) | Northwestern | |
| 2014 | Brad Craddock | Maryland | |
| 2015 | Griffin Oakes | Indiana | |
| 2016 | Emmit Carpenter | Minnesota | |
| 2017 | Griffin Oakes (2) | Indiana | |
| 2018 | Chase McLaughlin | Illinois | |
| 2019 | Keith Duncan | Iowa | |
| 2020 | Connor Culp | Nebraska | |
| 2021 | Jake Moody | Michigan | |
| 2022 | Jake Moody (2) | Michigan | |
| 2023 | Dragan Kesich | Minnesota | |
| 2024 | Dominic Zvada | Michigan | |
| 2025 | Nico Radicic | Indiana | |

=== Eddleman–Fields Punter of the Year ===
Named in honor of Illinois' Dwight Eddleman and Michigan State's Brandon Fields.

| Season | Player | Team | Ref. |
|---|---|---|---|
| 2011 | Brett Maher | Nebraska | |
| 2012 | Will Hagerup | Michigan | |
| 2013 | Cody Webster | Purdue | |
| 2014 | Peter Mortell | Minnesota | |
| 2015 | Sam Foltz | Nebraska | |
| 2016 | Cameron Johnston | Ohio State | |
| 2017 | Ryan Anderson | Rutgers | |
| 2018 | Will Hart | Michigan | |
| 2019 | Blake Hayes | Illinois | |
| 2020 | Tory Taylor | Iowa | |
| 2021 | Jordan Stout | Penn State | |
| 2022 | Bryce Baringer | Michigan State | |
| 2023 | Tory Taylor (2) | Iowa | |
| 2024 | Eddie Czaplicki | USC | |
| 2025 | Ryan Eckley | Michigan State | |

=== Rodgers–Dwight Return Specialist of the Year ===
Named in honor of Nebraska's Johnny Rodgers and Iowa's Tim Dwight.

| Season | Player | Team | Ref. |
|---|---|---|---|
| 2015 | William Likely | Maryland | |
| 2016 | Jabrill Peppers | Michigan | |
| 2017 | Saquon Barkley | Penn State | |
| 2018 | Ihmir Smith-Marsette | Iowa | |
| 2019 | Javon Leake | Maryland | |
| 2020 | Aron Cruickshank | Rutgers | |
| 2021 | Charlie Jones | Iowa | |
| 2022 | Jaylin Lucas | Indiana | |
| 2023 | Cooper DeJean | Iowa | |
| 2024 | Kaden Wetjen | Iowa | |
| 2025 | Kaden Wetjen (2) | Iowa | |

== See also ==
- Chicago Tribune Silver Football
