= 1988 Liberty Bowl =

- 30th Liberty Bowl
| Indiana Hoosiers | South Carolina Gamecocks |
| (7–3–1) | (8–3) |
| Big Ten | Independent |
| 34 | 10 |
| Head coach: Bill Mallory | Head coach: Joe Morrison |
| | 1 | 2 | 3 | 4 | Total |
|---|---|---|---|---|---|
| Indiana | 7 | 10 | 3 | 14 | 34 |
| South Carolina | 0 | 0 | 10 | 0 | 10 |
- Date: December 28, 1988
- Season: 1988
- Stadium: Liberty Bowl Memorial Stadium
- Location: Memphis, Tennessee
- MVP: Dave Schnell (Indiana QB)
- Referee: Thomas Thamert (CIFOA)
- Attendance: 39,210

United States TV coverage
- Network: Raycom Sports
- Announcers: Phil Stone and Dave Rowe

The 1988 Liberty Bowl, a college football postseason bowl game, took place on December 28, 1988, at Liberty Bowl Memorial Stadium in Memphis, Tennessee. The competing teams in the 30th Liberty Bowl were the Indiana Hoosiers of the Big Ten Conference, and the South Carolina Gamecocks, who competed as a I-A independent. In what was the first ever meeting between the schools, Indiana was victorious in by a final score of 34–10.

== Teams ==
=== Indiana ===
The 1988 Indiana squad finished the regular season with a tie at Missouri and losses against Michigan, Illinois and Michigan State en route to an overall record of seven wins, three losses and one tie (7–3–1). In mid-November, the Hoosiers accepted an invitation to play in the Liberty Bowl. Their appearance marked the first for Indiana in the Liberty Bowl, and their fifth overall bowl game.

=== South Carolina ===
The 1988 South Carolina squad finished the regular season with losses at Georgia Tech and Clemson and at home to Florida State en route to an overall record of eight wins and three losses (8–3). After their loss to Clemson in the regular season finale on November 19, the Gamecocks publicly accepted an invitation to play in the Liberty Bowl. The appearance marked the first for South Carolina in the Liberty Bowl, and their eighth overall bowl game.

== Game summary ==
The 1988 edition of the Liberty Bowl, marked the 30th edition and the kickoff occurred in sub-freezing conditions. The Hoosiers scored early in the game when Anthony Thompson gave Indiana a 7–0 lead with his nine-yard touchdown run. They extended their lead further to 17–0 at halftime after a ten-yard Dave Schnell touchdown pass to Calvert Miller and a 28-yard Pete Stoyanovich field goal in the second quarter. The Gamecocks scored their only touchdown early in the third quarter when Antonio Walker blocked a Macky Smith punt that was recovered and returned 34-yards by Mike Tolbert for the score. Each team then traded field goals, Stoyanovich from 19-yards for Indiana and Collin Mackie from 44-yards for Carolina that made the score 20–10 at the end of the third quarter. The Hoosiers then closed the game with a pair of fourth-quarter touchdowns and won 34–10. Points were scored on an 88-yard, Rob Turner touchdown reception from Dave Schnell and an eight-yard Thompson run. Dave Schnell was named the MVP of the game as he completed 16 of 31 passes for 378 yards and two touchdowns.

Scoring summary

| Quarter | Time | Drive | | | Team | Scoring information | Score | |
| Quarter | Time | Plays | Yards | TOP | Team | Scoring information | Indiana | USC |
|---|---|---|---|---|---|---|---|---|
| 1 | 9:23 | 8 | 88 | 3:35 | Indiana | Anthony Thompson 9-yard touchdown run, Pete Stoyanovich kick good | 7 | 0 |
| 2 | 5:54 | 5 | 40 | 1:46 | Indiana | Calvert Miller 10-yard touchdown reception from Dave Schnell, Pete Stoyanovich kick good | 14 | 0 |
| 2 | 0:30 | 6 | 73 | 1:57 | Indiana | 28-yard field goal by Pete Stoyanovich | 17 | 0 |
| 3 | 12:19 | – | – | – | USC | Mike Tolbert 34-yard blocked punt return, Collin Mackie kick good | 17 | 7 |
| 3 | 8:34 | 6 | 53 | 1:53 | Indiana | 19-yard field goal by Pete Stoyanovich | 20 | 7 |
| 3 | 3:36 | 11 | 47 | 4:55 | USC | 44-yard field goal by Collin Mackie | 20 | 10 |
| 4 | 14:45 | 1 | 88 | 0:15 | Indiana | Rob Turner 88-yard touchdown reception from Dave Schnell, Pete Stoyanovich kick good | 27 | 10 |
| 4 | 8:31 | 10 | 56 | 3:52 | Indiana | Anthony Thompson 8-yard touchdown run, Pete Stoyanovich kick good | 34 | 10 |
| "TOP" = time of possession. For other American football terms, see Glossary of American football. | | | | | | | 34 | 10 |
