= 1988 Peach Bowl =

The 1988 Peach Bowl may refer to:

- The 1987 season Peach Bowl - January 2, 1988, game between the Tennessee Volunteers and the Indiana Hoosiers
- The 1988 season Peach Bowl - December 31, 1988, game between the NC State Wolfpack and the Iowa Hawkeyes
