= 1988 Iowa Hawkeyes football team =

American college football season

1988 Iowa Hawkeyes football

Peach Bowl, L 23–28 vs. NC State
- Conference: Big Ten Conference
- Record: 6–4–3 (4–1–3 Big Ten)
- Head coach: Hayden Fry (10th season)
- Offensive coordinator: Bill Snyder (10th season)
- Offensive scheme: Pro-style
- Defensive coordinator: Bill Brashier (10th season)
- Base defense: 5–2
- MVPs: Marv Cook; Joe Mott
- Captains: Marv Cook; Dave Haight; Chuck Hartlieb; Bob Kratch; Jim Reilly
- Home stadium: Kinnick Stadium

1988 Big Ten Conference football standings
	Conf.					Overall
Team	W		L		T	W		L		T
No. 4 Michigan $	7	–	0	–	1	9	–	2	–	1
Michigan State	6	–	1	–	1	6	–	5	–	1
Illinois	5	–	2	–	1	6	–	5	–	1
Iowa	4	–	1	–	3	6	–	4	–	3
No. 20 Indiana	5	–	3	–	0	8	–	3	–	1
Purdue	3	–	5	–	0	4	–	7	–	0
Ohio State	2	–	5	–	1	4	–	6	–	1
Northwestern	2	–	5	–	1	2	–	8	–	1
Wisconsin	1	–	7	–	0	1	–	10	–	0
Minnesota	0	–	6	–	2	2	–	7	–	2
$ – Conference champion; Rankings from AP Poll

The 1988 Iowa Hawkeyes football team represented the University of Iowa as a member of the Big Ten Conference during the 1988 NCAA Division I-A football season. Led by tenth-year head coach Hayden Fry, the Hawkeyes compiled an overall record of 6–4–3 with a mark of 4–1–3 in conference play, tying for third place in the Big Ten. Iowa was invited to the Peach Bowl, where the Hawkeyes lost to NC State. The team played home games at Kinnick Stadium in Iowa City, Iowa.

The 1988 season marked the 100th season of Iowa Hawkeyes football.

== Schedule ==
Date	Opponent	Rank	Site	TV	Result	Attendance	Source
September 3	at Hawaii*	No. 9	Aloha Stadium; Halawa, HI		L 24–27	46,721	
September 10	at Kansas State*	No. 17	KSU Stadium; Manhattan, KS		W 45–10	21,000	
September 17	Colorado*	No. 19	Kinnick Stadium; Iowa City, IA		L 21–24	67,700	
September 24	Iowa State*		Kinnick Stadium; Iowa City, IA (rivalry)		W 10–3	67,700	
October 1	at Michigan State		Spartan Stadium; East Lansing, MI	ABC	T 10–10	76,348	
October 8	Wisconsin		Kinnick Stadium; Iowa City, IA (rivalry)		W 31–6	67,700	
October 15	No. 15 Michigan		Kinnick Stadium; Iowa City, IA	ABC	T 17–17	67,700	
October 22	at Purdue		Ross–Ade Stadium; West Lafayette, IA		W 31–7	62,264	
October 29	at Indiana		Memorial Stadium; Bloomington, IN	ABC	L 34–45	52,128	
November 5	Northwestern		Kinnick Stadium; Iowa City, IA		W 35–10	67,700	
November 12	Ohio State		Kinnick Stadium; Iowa City, IA		T 24–24	67,700	
November 19	at Minnesota		Hubert H. Humphrey Metrodome; Minneapolis, MN (rivalry)		W 31–22	63,894	
December 31	vs. North Carolina State*		Atlanta–Fulton County Stadium; Atlanta, GA (Peach Bowl)	Mizlou	L 23–28	44,635	
*Non-conference game; Rankings from AP Poll released prior to the game

== Game summaries ==
=== Hawaii ===
Team	1	2	3	4	Total
#9 Iowa	7	14	0	3	24
• Hawaii	7	7	0	13	27

- Date: September 3
- Location: Aloha Stadium, Halawa, Hawaii
- Game start: 7:06 PM
- Elapsed time: 3:20
- Game attendance: 46,721
- Game weather: 82 °F (28 °C), Cloudy with a few showers, Wind ENE 13 mph (21 km/h)
- Referee: Pat Sweeney

Scoring summary
1	3:13	Hawaii	Fakava 28-yard run (Elam kick)	Hawaii 7–0
1	2:20	Iowa	Stewart 67-yard run (Skillett kick)	Tied 7–7
2	10:59	Iowa	Stewart 6-yard run (Skillett kick)	Iowa 14–7
2	6:49	Hawaii	Fakava 1-yard run (Elam kick)	Tied 14–14
2	2:09	Iowa	Hudson 14-yard pass from Hartlieb (Skillett kick)	Iowa 21–14
4	12:57	Hawaii	Fakava 5-yard run (Elam kick)	Tied 21–21
4	9:58	Hawaii	Elam 47-yard field goal	Hawaii 24–21
4	7:54	Iowa	Skillett 44-yard field goal	Tied 24–24
4	1:36	Hawaii	Elam 23-yard field goal	Hawaii 27–24

After surrendering a 23-yard field goal by freshman Jason Elam with 1:36 left in the game, Iowa quickly drove to the Hawaii 20-yard line with 48 seconds remaining. A false start penalty pushed the Hawkeyes back five yards, then a devastating holding penalty wiped out a potential go-ahead touchdown from Chuck Hartlieb to Travis Watkins with 40 seconds left. After converting from the same distance midway through the 4th quarter, freshman kicker Jeff Skillett left a 44-yard field goal attempt short that would have tied the game with 17 seconds on the clock.

=== Kansas State ===
Team	1	2	3	4	Total
• #17 Iowa	10	7	21	7	45
Kansas State	0	10	0	0	10

- Date: September 10
- Location: KSU Stadium, Manhattan, Kansas
- Game start: 1:00 PM CDT
- Elapsed time: 3:15
- Game attendance: 21,000
- Game weather: 90 °F (32 °C), Sunny, Wind SSW 16 mph (26 km/h)
- Referee: Sam Maphis

Scoring summary
1	11:35	IOWA	Stewart 1-yard run (Skillett kick)	IOWA 7–0
1	5:19	IOWA	Skillett 22-yard field goal	IOWA 10–0
2	13:25	KSU	Washington 12-yard pass from Straw (Porter kick)	IOWA 10–7
2	7:15	IOWA	Watkins 32-yard pass from Hartlieb (Skillett kick)	IOWA 17–7
2	5:15	KSU	Porter 38-yard field goal	IOWA 17–10
3	12:26	IOWA	Hartlieb 1-yard run (Skillett kick)	IOWA 24-10
3	9:00	IOWA	Stewart 1-yard run (Skillett kick)	IOWA 31-10
3	5:16	IOWA	Quast 94-yard interception return (Skillett kick)	IOWA 38-10
4	6:09	IOWA	Wise 81-yard interception return (Skillett kick)	IOWA 45–10

The Hawkeyes' 35-point victory extended the Wildcats' winless streak to 18 consecutive games. Iowa Offensive coordinator Bill Snyder was hired as Head coach at Kansas State following the regular season.

=== Colorado ===
Team	1	2	3	4	Total
• Colorado	14	0	3	7	24
#19 Iowa	0	14	7	0	21

- Date: September 17
- Location: Kinnick Stadium, Iowa City, Iowa
- Game start: 1:05 PM CDT
- Elapsed time: 3:00
- Game attendance: 67,700
- Game weather: 85 °F (29 °C), Sunny, Wind SW 15–18 mph (24–29 km/h)
- Referee: Gil Marchman
- Source: Box Score and Game Story

Scoring summary
1	5:28	CU	J.J. Flannigan 5-yard run (Hannah kick)	Colorado 7–0
1	2:20	CU	Sal Aunese 17-yard run (Hannah kick)	Colorado 14–0
2	6:44	Iowa	Merton Hanks recovery of a blocked punt (Skillett kick)	Colorado 14–7
2	2:42	Iowa	David Hudson 3-yard run (Skillett kick)	Tied 14–14
3	9:13	CU	Eric Hannah 28-yard field goal	Colorado 17–14
3	3:20	Iowa	Tom Ward 19-yard pass from Chuck Hartlieb (Skillett kick)	Iowa 21–17
4	1:55	CU	Aunese 1-yard run (Hannah kick)	Colorado 24–21

Colorado coach Bill McCartney indicated this win over the Hawkeyes was a major win for the Colorado football program. The Buffaloes finished the 1988 season with an 8-4 record before consecutive 11-win seasons in 1989 and 1990, the latter capped by an AP National Championship.

=== Iowa State ===
Team	1	2	3	4	Total
Iowa State	0	3	0	0	3
• Iowa	0	3	7	0	10

- Date: September 24
- Location: Kinnick Stadium, Iowa City, Iowa
- Game start: 11:15 AM CDT
- Elapsed time: 3:00
- Game attendance: 67,700
- Game weather: 76 °F (24 °C), Sunny, Wind SW 7–10 mph (11–16 km/h)
- Referee: Tom Quinn
- Source: Box Score and Game Story

Scoring summary
2	13:04	IOWA	Skillett 32-yard field goal	IOWA 3–0
2	0:46	ISU	Shudak 40-yard field goal	Tied 3–3
3	6:06	IOWA	Stewart 26-yard pass from Hartlieb (Skillett kick)	IOWA 10–3

The win over the Cyclones was the Hawkeyes sixth consecutive over their in-state rivals.

=== Michigan State ===
Team	1	2	3	4	Total
Iowa	0	3	7	0	10
Michigan State	3	0	7	0	10

- Date: October 1
- Location: Spartan Stadium, East Lansing, Michigan
- Game attendance: 76,348
- Television network: ABC Sports
- Source: Box Score and Game Story

Scoring summary
1		Mich St	Langeloh 37-yard field goal	Mich St 3–0
2		IOWA	Skillett 28-yard field goal	Tied 3–3
3		Mich St	Rison 48-yard pass from McAllister (Langeloh kick)	Mich St 10–3
3	6:06	IOWA	Filloon 5-yard pass from Stewart (Skillett kick)	Tied 10–10

=== Wisconsin ===
Team	1	2	3	4	Total
Wisconsin	0	3	0	3	6
• Iowa	3	6	8	14	31

- Date: October 8
- Location: Kinnick Stadium, Iowa City, Iowa
- Game attendance: 67,700
- Source: Box Score and Game Story

Scoring summary
1	IOWA	Skillett 48-yard field goal	IOWA 3–0
2	IOWA	Skillett 33-yard field goal	IOWA 6–0
2	IOWA	Skillett 37-yard field goal	IOWA 9–0
2	Wisc	Mehring 42-yard field goal	IOWA 9–3
3	IOWA	Stewart 9-yard run (Hudson pass from Hartlieb)	IOWA 17-3
4	Wisc	Mehring 41-yard field goal	IOWA 17–6
4	IOWA	Hudson 3-yard run (Skillett kick)	IOWA 24–6
4	IOWA	Harberts 4-yard pass from Hartlieb (Skillett kick)	IOWA 31–6

=== Michigan ===
Team	1	2	3	4	Total
Michigan	3	7	7	0	17
Iowa	7	10	0	0	17

- Date: October 15
- Location: Kinnick Stadium, Iowa City, Iowa
- Game attendance: 67,700
- Television network: ABC
- Source: Box Score and Game Story

Scoring summary
1	IOWA	Cook 5-yard pass from Hartlieb (Skillett kick)	IOWA 7–0
1	Mich	Gillette 43-yard field goal	IOWA 7–3
2	IOWA	Skillett 32-yard field goal	IOWA 10–3
2	IOWA	Hudson 5-yard run (Skillett kick)	IOWA 17–3
2	Mich	Taylor 5-yard run (Gillette kick)	IOWA 17–10
3	Mich	Kolesar 24-yard pass from Taylor (Gillette kick)	Tied 17–17

A 17-17 tie at Kinnick Stadium was the lone blemish on an otherwise perfect Big Ten season for the Wolverines. After opening the season with consecutive losses, 19-17 at eventual National Champion Notre Dame and 31-30 at home to the team that finished #2 in the final polls, Miami (a game Michigan led 30-14 in the 4th quarter), Michigan went 9-0-1 the rest of the season including a Rose Bowl victory to finish with a #4 ranking. Michigan fumbled on the goal line very late in the game.

=== Purdue ===
Team	1	2	3	4	Total
• Iowa	7	3	7	14	31
Purdue	7	0	0	0	7

- Date: October 22
- Location: Ross–Ade Stadium, West Lafayette, Indiana
- Game attendance: 62,264
- Source: Box Score and Game Story

Scoring summary
1	IOWA	Hudson 8-yard run (Skillett kick)	IOWA 7–0
1	Purdue	Schramayr 9-yard pass from Fox (Sullivan kick)	Tied 7–7
2	IOWA	Skillett 22-yard field goal	IOWA 10–7
3	IOWA	Harberts 11-yard pass from Hartlieb (Skillett kick)	IOWA 17–7
4	IOWA	Bass 9-yard run (Skillett kick)	IOWA 24–7
4	IOWA	Saunders 72-yard run (Skillett kick)	IOWA 31–7

=== Indiana ===
Team	1	2	3	4	Total
Iowa	3	8	15	8	34
• Indiana	14	21	0	10	45

- Date: October 29
- Location: Memorial Stadium (Indiana), Bloomington, Indiana
- Game attendance: 52,128
- Television network: ABC Sports
- Source: Box Score and Game Story

Scoring summary
1	Indiana	Turner 38-yard pass from Schnell (Stoyanovich kick)	Indiana 7–0
1	IOWA	Skillett 38-yard field goal	Indiana 7–3
1	Indiana	Thompson 1-yard run (Stoyanovich kick)	Indiana 14–3
2	Indiana	Schnell 2-yard run (Stoyanovich kick)	Indiana 21–3
2	Indiana	Miller 3-yard pass from Schnell (Stoyanovich kick)	Indiana 28–3
2	Indiana	Thompson 4-yard run (Stoyanovich kick)	Indiana 35–3
2	IOWA	Filloon 14-yard pass from Hartlieb (Cook pass from Hartlieb)	Indiana 35–11
3	IOWA	Stewart 3-yard run (Hartlieb pass from Saunders)	Indiana 35–19
3	IOWA	Harberts 59-yard pass from Hartlieb (Skillett kick)	Indiana 35–26
4	Indiana	Thompson 1-yard run (Stoyanovich kick)	Indiana 42–26
4	IOWA	Bell 12-yard pass from Hartlieb (Cook pass from Hartlieb)	Indiana 42–34
4	Indiana	Stoyanovich 40-yard field goal	Indiana 45–34

Though Iowa finished only 4th in the final Big Ten standings, this was their lone conference loss. Chuck Hartlieb set the Iowa single game passing record with 558 yards through the air. Wide receiver Deven Harberts had 11 receptions for 233 yards and a touchdown.

=== Northwestern ===
Team	1	2	3	4	Total
Northwestern	0	0	3	7	10
• Iowa	7	14	0	14	35

- Date: November 5
- Location: Kinnick Stadium, Iowa City, Iowa
- Game attendance: 67,700
- Source: Box Score and Game Story

Scoring summary
1	9:06	IOWA	Bass 11-yard run (Skillett kick)	IOWA 7–0
2	8:54	IOWA	Bell 6-yard run (Skillett kick)	IOWA 14–0
2	0:36	IOWA	Stewart 1-yard run (Skillett kick)	IOWA 21–0
3	8:01	NW	Adler 31-yard field goal	IOWA 21–3
4	13:01	IOWA	Bell 3-yard run (Skillett kick)	IOWA 28-3
4	11:25	IOWA	Cook 3-yard pass from Hartlieb (Skillett kick)	IOWA 35-3
4		NW	Buchanan 13-yard pass from O'Brien (Adler kick)	IOWA 35–10

=== Ohio State ===
Team	1	2	3	4	Total
Ohio State	7	7	7	3	24
Iowa	14	7	0	3	24

- Date: November 12
- Location: Kinnick Stadium, Iowa City, Iowa
- Game attendance: 67,700
- Source: Box Score and Game Story

Scoring summary
1		IOWA	Stewart 1-yard run (Skillett kick)	IOWA 7–0
1		IOWA	Cook 29-yard pass from Hartlieb (Skillett kick)	IOWA 14–0
1		OSU	Mike Sullivan 13-yard interception return (O'Morrow kick)	IOWA 14–7
2		IOWA	Harberts 48-yard pass from Hartlieb (Skillett kick)	IOWA 21–7
2		OSU	Ellis 2-yard pass from Frey (O'Morrow kick)	IOWA 21–14
3		OSU	Graham 7-yard run (O'Morrow kick)	Tied 21-21
4	8:22	OSU	O'Morrow 39-yard field goal	OSU 24-21
4	0:16	IOWA	Skillett 40-yard field goal	Tied 24–24

=== Minnesota ===
Team	1	2	3	4	Total
• Iowa	6	6	13	6	31
Minnesota	3	10	9	0	22

- Date: November 19
- Location: Hubert H. Humphrey Metrodome, Minneapolis, Minnesota
- Game attendance: 63,894
- Source: Box Score and Game Story

Scoring summary
1	IOWA	Mike Saunders 1-yard run (kick failed)	IOWA 6–0
1	Minn	Brent Berglund 27-yard field goal	IOWA 6–3
2	IOWA	Mike Saunders 1-yard run (conversion failed)	IOWA 12–3
2	Minn	Berglund 50-yard field goal	IOWA 12–6
2	Minn	Chris Gaiters 11-yard pass from Schaffner (Berglund kick)	Minn 13–12
3	IOWA	Jerald Moore 4-yard pass from Hartlieb (pass failed)	IOWA 18–13
3	Minn	Berglund 20-yard field goal	IOWA 18–16
3	Minn	Jason Bruce 24-yard pass from Schaffner (conversion failed)	Minn 22-18
3	IOWA	Mike Saunders 1-yard run (Skillett kick)	IOWA 25–22
4	IOWA	George Murphy 22-yard field goal	IOWA 28–22
4	IOWA	George Murphy 40-yard field goal	IOWA 31–22

=== Vs. NC State (Peach Bowl) ===
Peach Bowl

Team	1	2	3	4	Total
Iowa	3	7	7	6	23
• NC State	7	21	0	0	28

- Date: December 31
- Location: Atlanta–Fulton County Stadium, Atlanta
- Game start: 1:17 PM
- Elapsed time: 3:33
- Game attendance: 44,635
- Game weather: 50 °F (10 °C), Overcast, Wind SE 5 mph (8.0 km/h)
- Referee: Nick Define
- TV announcers (Mizlou): Ray Scott and Ed Biles

Scoring summary
1	12:51	NC State	Davenport 1-yard touchdown run (Hartman kick)	NC State 7–0
1	8:08	Iowa	Murphy 30-yard field goal	NC State 7–3
2	14:50	NC State	Peebles 75-yard pass from Montgomery (Hartman kick)	NC State 14–3
2	13:24	NC State	Jackson 2-yard run (Hartman kick)	NC State 21–3
2	10:37	NC State	Jackson 30-yard run (Hartman kick)	NC State 28–3
2	1:58	Iowa	Harberts 8-yard pass from Hartlieb (Murphy kick)	NC State 28-10
3	12:54	Iowa	Harberts 22-yard pass from Hartlieb (Murphy kick)	NC State 28-17
4	0:08	Iowa	Smith 7-yard pass from Hartlieb (pass failed)	NC State 28–23

In a game played through a steady rain, the teams combined for 14 turnovers (7 each) and 12 fumbles (8 lost). NC State opened up a 28-3 second quarter lead by converting three Hawkeye fumbles into touchdowns. Iowa fought until the end behind Chuck Hartlieb's 428 passing yards.

== Roster ==
1988 Iowa Hawkeyes football team roster
Players
Coaches
Offense

Pos.	#	Name	Class
OL	75	Greg Aegerter	So
C	50	Bill Anderson	Jr
FB	23	Richard Bass	Sr
RB	43	Nick Bell	So
TE	84	Marv Cook	Sr
OL	63	Jeff Croston	Sr
OL	58	Greg Divis
WR	82	Jon Filloon	Fr
RB	22	Grant Goodman	Sr
WR	16	Deven Harberts	Sr
QB	8	Chuck Hartlieb	Sr
FB	20	David Hudson	Sr
G	70	Bob Kratch	Sr
WR	26	Peter Marciano	Sr
TE	85	John Palmer	Sr
QB	14	Tom Poholsky	Jr
OL	67	Jim Poynton	Sr
RB	33	Kevin Ringer	Sr
QB	7	Matt Rodgers	Fr
RB	32	Mike Saunders	Fr
OL	60	Bob Schmitt
RB	21	Tony Stewart	So
OL	71	Chuck Waggoner	Sr
TE	88	Tom Ward	Sr
WR	2	Travis Watkins	Jr

Defense

Pos.	#	Name	Class
DE	48	Tyrone Berrie	Sr
DB	29	Greg Brown
DE	5	Mike Burke
NG	54	Rod Davis	Fr
LB	31	John Derby	Fr
DE	96	Ron Geater	Fr
CB	45	Merton Hanks	So
DE	83	Mike Ertz	Sr
LB	66	Melvin Foster	So
DL	64	Dave Haight	Sr
FS	45	Merton Hanks	So
DL	54	Eric Higgins	Sr
DB	42	Tork Hook	Sr
DL	71	Jim Johnson	So
DL	51	Jeff Koeppel	Jr
LB	34	Vernon Little	Sr
DE	97	Joe Mott	Sr
DE	71	Chris Pigott	Sr
LB	35	Brad Quast	Jr
LB	95	Jim Reilly	Sr
LB	38	Shawon Respress	Sr
DE	91	Sean Ridley	Sr
DB	44	Keaton Smiley	Sr
DB	41	Mark Stoops	Sr
DB	15	Brian Wise	Fr
DB	10	Anthony Wright	Jr

Special teams

Pos.	#	Name	Class
K		Mark Adams
K	11	Jeff Skillett	Fr

Head coach

- Hayden Fry

Coordinators/assistant coaches

- Bill Snyder – Offensive Coordinator/Quarterbacks
- Bill Brashier – Defensive Coordinator
- Kirk Ferentz – Offensive line
- Carl Jackson – Running backs
- Del Miller – Offensive assistant
- Dan McCarney – Defensive line
- Don Patterson – Tight ends
- Bernie Wyatt – Defensive Ends/Recruiting Coordinator
- Bill Dervich – Strength and Conditioning

Legend

- (C) Team captain
- (S) Suspended
- (I) Ineligible
- Injured
- Redshirt

== Postseason awards ==
- Marv Cook, Tight end – Consensus First-team All-American
- Dave Haight, Defensive tackle – First-team All-American

== Team players in the 1989 NFL draft ==
Player	Position	Round	Pick	NFL club
Marv Cook	Tight end	3	63	New England Patriots
Bob Kratch	Guard	3	64	New York Giants
Joe Mott	Linebacker	3	70	New York Jets
Chuck Hartlieb	Quarterback	12	325	Houston Oilers
