= 1988 All-American Bowl =

Illinois Fighting Illini	Florida Gators
(6–4–1)	(6–5)
Big Ten	SEC
10	14
Head coach: John Mackovic	Head coach: Galen Hall
	1	2	3	4	Total
Illinois	0	7	0	3	10
Florida	7	0	0	7	14
- Date: December 29, 1988
- Season: 1988
- Stadium: Legion Field
- Location: Birmingham, Alabama
- MVP: RB Emmitt Smith (Florida)
- Attendance: 48,218

United States TV coverage
- Network: ESPN
- Announcers: Roger Twibell and Lee Corso

The 1988 All-American Bowl was a post-season American college football bowl game at Legion Field in Birmingham, Alabama between the University of Illinois Fighting Illini and the University of Florida Gators on December 29, 1988. The game was the final contest of the 1988 NCAA Division I-A football season for both teams, and ended in a 14–10 victory for Florida.

== Game summary ==
Head Coach John Mackovic led Illinois to a 6-4-1 record and a third-place finish in the Big Ten, reaching the All-American Bowl against the successful Southeastern Conference team from Florida. On the first play from scrimmage, Florida freshman Emmitt Smith ran 55 yards for a touchdown. Illinois tied the score on a 30-yard run by Keith Jones in the second quarter. After a fourth-quarter Doug Higgins field goal gave Illinois a three-point lead, Smith scored his second touchdown with less than four minutes remaining to give the Gators the victory.

== Scoring summary ==
Quarter	Team	Scoring summary	Score	
Quarter	Team	Scoring summary	Illinois	Florida
1	Florida	Emmitt Smith 55-yard touchdown run, John Francis kick good	0	7
2	Illinois	Keith Jones 30-yard touchdown run, Doug Higgins kick good	7	7
3			7	7
4	Illinois	Doug Higgins 44-yard field goal	10	7
4	Florida	Emmitt Smith 2-yard touchdown run, John Francis kick good	10	14
			10	14

== Statistical summary ==
Team Statistics

(Rushing-Passing-Total): UI - 55-194-249; UF - 187-69-256.

Individual Statistical Leaders

Rushing (Att.-Yds.-TD): UI - Jones 18-88-1; UF - Smith 28-159-2.

Passing (Att.-Comp.-Int.-TD-Yds.): UI - Jeff George 37-20-2-0-194; UF - Kyle Morris 12-6-2-0-50.

Receiving (No.-Yds.-TD): UI - Mike Bellamy 5-49-0; Steven Williams 5-49-0; UF - Terence Barber 4-29-0.
