= 1988 Ohio State Buckeyes football team =

American college football season

1988 Ohio State Buckeyes football
- Conference: Big Ten Conference
- Record: 4–6–1 (2–5–1 Big Ten)
- Head coach: John Cooper (1st season)
- Offensive coordinator: Jim Colletto (1st season)
- Offensive scheme: Singleback
- Defensive coordinator: Bill Young (1st season)
- Base defense: 3–4
- MVP: Jeff Uhlenhake
- Captains: Michael McCray; Mike Sullivan; Jeff Uhlenhake; Vince Workman
- Home stadium: Ohio Stadium

1988 Big Ten Conference football standings
	Conf.					Overall
Team	W		L		T	W		L		T
No. 4 Michigan $	7	–	0	–	1	9	–	2	–	1
Michigan State	6	–	1	–	1	6	–	5	–	1
Illinois	5	–	2	–	1	6	–	5	–	1
Iowa	4	–	1	–	3	6	–	4	–	3
No. 20 Indiana	5	–	3	–	0	8	–	3	–	1
Purdue	3	–	5	–	0	4	–	7	–	0
Ohio State	2	–	5	–	1	4	–	6	–	1
Northwestern	2	–	5	–	1	2	–	8	–	1
Wisconsin	1	–	7	–	0	1	–	10	–	0
Minnesota	0	–	6	–	2	2	–	7	–	2
$ – Conference champion; Rankings from AP Poll

The 1988 Ohio State Buckeyes football team was an American football team that represented the Ohio State University as a member of the Big Ten Conference during the 1988 NCAA Division I-A football season. In their first year under head coach John Cooper, the Buckeyes compiled a 4–6–1 record (2–5–1 in conference games), tied for seventh place in the Big Ten, and were outscored by a total of 283 to 229. It was Ohio State's first losing season since 1966, and the Buckeyes were unranked in the final AP poll.

The Buckeyes gained an average of 150.4 rushing yards and 187.1 passing yards per game. On defense, they held opponents to 192.4 rushing yards and 192.9 passing yards per game. The team's statistical leaders included quarterback Greg Frey (2,028 passing yards, 51.9% completion percentage), running back Carlos Snow (775 rushing yards, 5.1 yards per carry), and tight end Jeff Ellis (40 receptions for 492 yards). No Ohio State players received first-team honors on the 1988 All-Big Ten Conference football team. Center Jeff Uhlenhake, defensive back Zack Dumas, and kicker Pat O'Morrow received second-team honors.

The team played its home games at Ohio Stadium in Columbus, Ohio.

== Schedule ==
Date	Time	Opponent	Rank	Site	TV	Result	Attendance	Source
September 10	3:30 p.m.	Syracuse*		Ohio Stadium; Columbus, OH	ABC	W 26–9	89,768	
September 17	7:00 p.m.	at Pittsburgh*	No. 18	Pitt Stadium; Pittsburgh, PA	ESPN	L 10–42	56,500	
September 24	3:30 p.m.	No. 7 LSU*		Ohio Stadium; Columbus, OH	ABC	W 36–33	90,584	
October 1	1:30 p.m.	Illinois		Ohio Stadium; Columbus, OH (Illibuck)		L 12–31	90,274	
October 8	3:30 p.m.	at Indiana		Memorial Stadium; Bloomington, IN	ABC	L 7–41	52,133	
October 15	1:30 p.m.	Purdue		Ohio Stadium; Columbus, OH		L 26–31	90,970	
October 22	8:00 p.m.	Minnesota		Hubert H. Humphrey Metrodome; Minneapolis, MN		W 13–6	44,221	
October 29	12:00 p.m.	at Michigan State		Spartan Stadium; East Lansing, MI		L 10–20	77,111	
November 5	1:30 p.m.	Wisconsin		Ohio Stadium; Columbus, OH		W 34–12	90,032	
November 12	12:00 p.m.	at Iowa		Kinnick Stadium; Iowa City, IA		T 24–24	67,700	
November 19	12:00 p.m.	No. 12 Michigan		Ohio Stadium; Columbus, OH (rivalry)	ABC	L 31–34	90,176	
*Non-conference game; Rankings from AP Poll released prior to the game; All times are in Eastern time

== Game summaries ==
=== Syracuse ===
Team	1	2	3	4	Total
Syracuse	3	3	0	3	9
• Ohio St	0	17	6	3	26

- Date: September 10
- Location: Ohio Stadium, Columbus, Ohio

Scoring summary
1	SYR	Greene 24-yard field goal	Syracuse 3-0
2	OHST	O'Morrow 27-yard field goal	Tie 3-3
2	OHST	Snow 14-yard run (O'Morrow kick)	Ohio St 10-3
2	OHST	Ellis 2-yard pass from Frey (O'Morrow kick)	Ohio St 17-3
2	SYR	Greene 45-yard field goal	Ohio St 17-6
3	OHST	O'Morrow 33-yard field goal	Ohio St 20-6
3	OHST	O'Morrow 41-yard field goal	Ohio St 23-6
4	SYR	Greene 38-yard field goal	Ohio St 23-9
4	OHST	O'Morrow 30-yard field goal	Ohio St 26-9

=== Pittsburgh ===
Team	1	2	3	4	Total
Ohio St	3	0	0	7	10
• Pittsburgh	14	14	0	14	42

- Date: September 17
- Location: Pitt Stadium

=== LSU ===
Team	1	2	3	4	Total
LSU	3	10	10	10	33
• Ohio St	0	14	3	19	36

- Date: September 24
- Location: Ohio Stadium, Columbus, Ohio
- Game attendance: 90,584

Scoring summary
1	LSU	Browndyke 38 yard field goal	LSU 3–0
2	OHST	Snow 1 yard run (O'Morrow kick)	OHST 7–3
2	OHST	McCray 22 yard blocked punt return (O'Morrow kick)	OHST 14–3
2	LSU	Moss 30 yard pass from Hodson (Browndyke kick)	OHST 14–10
2	LSU	Browndyke 27 yard field goal	OHST 14–13
3	OHST	O'Morrow 35 yard field goal	OHST 17–13
3	LSU	E. Fuller 3 yard run (Browndyke kick)	LSU 20–17
3	LSU	Browndyke 35 yard field goal	LSU 23–17
4	OHST	O'Morrow 41 yard field goal	LSU 23–20
4	LSU	Browndyke 20 yard field goal	LSU 26–20
4	LSU	Lee 55 yard pass from Hodson (Browndyke kick)	LSU 33–20
4	OHST	Snow 5 yard run (O'Morrow kick)	LSU 33–27
4	OHST	Safety, Bourgeois ran through end zone	LSU 33–29
4	OHST	Olive 20 yard pass from Frey (O'Morrow kick)	OHST 36–33

=== Illinois ===
Team	1	2	3	4	Total
• Illinois	7	3	0	21	31
Ohio St	0	3	3	6	12

- Date: October 1
- Location: Ohio Stadium

=== Indiana ===
Team	1	2	3	4	Total
Ohio St	0	0	7	0	7
• Indiana	14	14	7	6	41

- Date: October 8
- Location: Memorial Stadium
- Game attendance: 52,133

=== Purdue ===
Purdue Boilermakers (2–3) at Ohio State Buckeyes (2–3)

Quarter	1	2	3	4	Total
Purdue	0	7	14	10	31
Ohio St	7	10	3	6	26

at Ohio Stadium, Columbus, Ohio

- Date: October 15
- Game time: 1:30 p.m. CDT
- Game weather: Partly sunny, 62 °F (17 °C)
- Game attendance: 90,970
- Referee: Jim Kemerling
- TV: WCMH

Game information

First quarter

- OSU – Carlos Snow 58-yard run (Pat O'Morrow kick), 9:32. Ohio St 7–0. Drive: 4 plays, 68 yards, 1:30.

Second quarter

- OSU – Greg Frey 1-yard run (Pat O'Morrow kick), 13:18. Ohio St 14–0. Drive: 12 plays, 86 yards, 5:13.
- PUR – Lance Scheib 46-yard pass from Brian Fox (Larry Sullivan kick), 10:52. Ohio St 14–7. Drive: 6 plays, 82 yards, 2:17.
- OSU – Pat O'Morrow 35-yard field goal, 0:48. Ohio St 17–7. Drive: 7 plays, 12 yards, 3:52.

Third quarter

- OSU – Pat O'Morrow 24-yard field goal, 10:22. Ohio St 20–7. Drive: 9 plays, 73 yards, 3:10.
- PUR – Ernie Schramayr 5-yard pass from Brian Fox (Larry Sullivan kick), 6:23. Ohio St 20–14. Drive: 9 plays, 67 yards, 3:54.
- PUR – Brian Fox 3-yard run (Larry Sullivan kick), 4:59. Purdue 21–20. Drive: 4 plays, 16 yards, 1:14.

Fourth quarter

- PUR – Ernie Schramayr 7-yard pass from Brian Fox (Larry Sullivan kick), 14:56. Purdue 28–20. Drive: 8 plays, 63 yards, 3:29.
- OSU – James Bryant 5-yard run (pass failed), 12:12. Purdue 28–26. Drive: 6 plays, 66 yards, 2:38.
- PUR – Larry Sullivan 49-yard field goal, 6:28. Purdue 31–26. Drive: 12 plays, 42 yards, 5:39.

Top passers

- PUR – Brian Fox – 19/27, 223 yards, 3 TD
- OSU – Greg Frey – 10/21, 193 yards, 2 INT

Top rushers

- PUR – Jarrett Scales – 21 rushes, 62 yards
- OSU – Carlos Snow – 20 rushes, 128 yards, TD

Top receivers

- PUR – Ernie Schramayr – 13 receptions, 106 yards, 2 TD
- OSU – Jeff Ellis – 3 receptions, 66 yards

=== Minnesota ===
Team	1	2	3	4	Total
• Ohio St	3	7	3	0	13
Minnesota	3	3	0	0	6

- Date: October 22
- Location: Hubert H. Humphrey Metrodome

=== Michigan State ===
Team	1	2	3	4	Total
Ohio St	7	3	0	0	10
• Michigan St	7	3	10	0	20

- Date: October 29
- Location: Spartan Stadium

=== Wisconsin ===
Team	1	2	3	4	Total
Wisconsin	6	6	0	0	12
• Ohio St	3	21	3	7	34

- Date: November 5
- Location: Ohio Stadium

=== Iowa ===
Team	1	2	3	4	Total
Ohio St	7	7	7	3	24
Iowa	14	7	0	3	24

- Date: November 12
- Location: Kinnick Stadium, Iowa City, Iowa
- Game start: 12:15 p.m. EST
- Elapsed time: 3:20
- Game attendance: 67,700
- Game weather: Rain; 40 °F (4 °C); wind 10–12 mph (16–19 km/h) SE
- Referee: Gil Marchman

Scoring summary
Q1	10:12	IOWA	Stewart 1 yard run (Skillett kick)	IOWA 7–0
Q1	8:41	IOWA	Cook 29 yard pass from Hartlieb (Skillett kick)	IOWA 14–0
Q1	4:17	OSU	M. Sullivan 13 yard interception return (O'Morrow kick)	IOWA 14–7
Q2	11:45	IOWA	Harberts 48 yard pass from Hartlieb (Skillett kick)	IOWA 21–7
Q2	7:51	OSU	Ellis 2 yard pass from Frey (O'Morrow kick)	IOWA 21–14
Q3	9:56	OSU	S. Graham 5 yard run (O'Morrow kick)	Tie 21–21
Q4	8:21	OSU	O'Morrow 39 yard field goal	OSU 24–21
Q4	:16	IOWA	Skillett 40 yard field goal	Tie 24–24

=== Michigan ===
Michigan Wolverines at Ohio State Buckeyes

Quarter	1	2	3	4	Total
Michigan	10	10	0	14	34
Ohio St	0	0	14	17	31

at Ohio Stadium, Columbus, Ohio

- Date: November 19, 1988
- Game time: 12:10 p.m.
- Game weather: Overcast, 44 °F (7 °C)
- Game attendance: 90,176
- Referee: John Nealow

Game information

First quarter

- MICH – Mike Gillette 22-yard field goal, 5:47. Michigan 3–0. Drive: 12 plays, 74 yards, 4:09.
- MICH – Greg McMurtry 57-yard pass from Demetrius Brown (Mike Gillette kick), 1:06. Michigan 10–0. Drive: 4 plays, 72 yards, 1:44.

Second quarter

- MICH – Leroy Hoard 18-yard run (Mike Gillette kick), 8:35. Michigan 17–0. Drive: 2 plays, 17 yards, 0:53.
- MICH – Mike Gillette 56-yard field goal, 0:00. Michigan 20–0. Drive: 5 plays, 36 yards, 2:35.

Third quarter

- OSU – Carlos Snow 4-yard run (Pat O'Morrow kick), 12:06. Michigan 20–7. Drive: 7 plays, 70 yards, 2:48.
- OSU – Bill Matlock 9-yard run (Pat O'Morrow kick), 4:59. Michigan 20–14. Drive: 8 plays, 66 yards, 3:08.

Fourth quarter

- OSU – Bobby Olive 4-yard pass from Greg Frey (Pat O'Morrow kick), 11:26. Ohio St 21–20. Drive: 8 plays, 90 yards, 3:42.
- OSU – Pat O'Morrow 21-yard field goal, 8:30. Ohio St 24–20. Drive: 6 plays, 18 yards, 2:50.
- MICH – Leroy Hoard 8-yard run (Mike Gillette kick), 4:20. Michigan 27–24. Drive: 10 plays, 76 yards, 4:03.
- OSU – Bill Matlock 16-yard run (Pat O'Morrow kick), 2:02. Ohio St 31–27. Drive: 6 plays, 92 yards, 2:12.
- MICH – John Kolesar 41-yard pass from Demetrius Brown (Mike Gillette kick), 1:37. Michigan 34–31. Drive: 2 plays, 41 yards, 0:15.

Top passers

- MICH – Demetrius Brown – 11/17, 223 yards, 2 TD
- OSU – Greg Frey – 14/29, 192 yards, TD, INT

Top rushers

- MICH – Leroy Hoard – 23 rushes, 158 yards, 2 TD
- OSU – Carlos Snow – 21 rushes, 170 yards, TD

Top receivers

- MICH – John Kolesar – 3 receptions, 95 yards, TD
- OSU – Bobby Olive – 3 receptions, 59 yards, TD

== Roster ==
1988 Ohio State Buckeyes football team roster
Players
Coaches
Offense

Pos.	#	Name	Class
C	76	Dan Beatty	So
WR	88	Greg Beatty	Fr
FB	38	Chris Boddie	So
FB	41	James Bryant	Jr
FL	18	Gary Clift	Sr
QB	12	Nick Cochran	Fr
OT	66	Karl Coles	Jr
TE	81	Anthony Cook	So
G	50	Jeff Davidson	Jr
SE	27	John Dawson	Fr
FL	2	Bernard Edwards	Fr
TE	89	Jeff Ellis	So
FL	47	Tony Fenstermaker	So
QB	9	Jason Frank	Fr
G	70	Steve France	Jr
QB	15	Greg Frey	So
RB	33	Tony Goodgame	Fr
SE	84	Jeff Graham	So
FB	35	Scottie Graham	Fr
G	65	Erik Grimm	So
OL	77	Len Hartman	Fr
QB	19	Kirk Herbstreit	Fr
RB	23	Marc Hicks	Jr
C	60	Dan Hirneise	So
RB	29	Buster Howe	Fr
C	71	Mike Huddleston	Fr
TE	87	Rich Huffman	So
RB	30	Brent Johnson	Fr
FL	82	David Menges	So
OT	64	Mike Kuri	Jr
C	62	Travis Lutz	Fr
FB	11	Bill Matlock	Sr
QB	21	David McAllister	Jr
OT	74	Tim Moxley	Jr
G	63	Roy Nichols	Fr
FL	37	Bobby Olive	So
TE	85	Jim Palmer	Jr
OT	75	John Peterson	So
QB	13	Scott Powell	Sr
TB	1	Lance Price	So
SE	5	Everett Ross	Sr
TE	80	Chris Roy	Fr
TE	91	Scott St. John	So
OT	69	John Schilling	Fr
C	53	Tom Scholl	Sr
OT	73	Paul Sherrick	Fr
OT	78	Mike Shoaf	Fr
SE	4	Wes Siegenthaler	So
TB	25	Carlos Snow	So
TB	28	John Spencer	So
QB	14	Chris Stablein	So
OT	79	Joe Staysniak	Jr
C	68	Jeff Uhlenhake (C)	Sr
G	61	Ken Voll	So
QB	17	John Wagoner	So
TB	42	Vince Workman (C)	Sr
G	51	Greg Zackeroff	Sr

Defense

Pos.	#	Name	Class
LB	32	Dave Bals	Fr
S	3	Sean Bell	Sr
ILB	91	Brian Benio	So
S	27	David Brown	Jr
LB	58	Joe Carpenter	So
OLB	16	Mike Chancey	So
CB	7	Vince Clark	So
LB	44	Tony Closson	Fr
DT	92	Ken Coleman	So
DB	83	Bryan Cook	Fr
ILB	56	Orlondo Craig	Jr
CB	22	Tony Cupe	So
DB	17	Doug Dinan	Jr
CB	21	Zack Dumas	Jr
LB	94	Derrick Foster	Fr
DT	90	Rich Frimel	Fr
CB	11	Mike Giesler	So
ILB	49	Andrew Gurd	So
LB	39	Tyrone Harrison	So
LB	36	Judah Herman	Fr
DB	18	Troy Hilsenroth	Fr
OLB	95	John Kacherski	So
LB	62	Charles Keenan	Jr
LB	35	Kristofer Kostival	Fr
OLB	81	Tom Lease	Fr
ILB	86	Gary Lickovitch	So
DT	53	Paul Long	Fr
DT	93	Derek MacCready	Sr
LB	43	John Martin	Fr
OLB	99	Michael McCray (C)	Sr
LB	34	Joe Metzger	Fr
DT	97	Tony Moore	So
DB	25	Chris Ntukgou	So
DT	72	Corey Pargo	Fr
S	46	Jim Peel	So
S	48	Mark Pelini	So
DB	33	Trevor Poole	So
S	13	Brady Pugh	Fr
DT	66	Stephen Robbins	So
OLB	47	Patrick Rogan	Fr
CB	24	Tim Rutledge	So
DT	98	Mike Showalter	Jr
CB	20	Dwight Smith	Sr
ILB	57	John Sullivan	Sr
NG	67	Mike Sullivan (C)	Sr
OLB	30	Otto Susec	So
NG	54	Pat Thomas	Jr
OLB	55	Jason Warner	Fr
OLB	96	Srecko Zizakovic	Jr

Special teams

Pos.	#	Name	Class
P	26	Jeff Bohlman	So
PK	41	Brian Eisenberg	Fr
PK	28	Bob Hoyt	So
LS	52	Tom Moore	Sr
PK	6	Pat O'Morrow	Jr
PK	42	Scott Osborne	Fr
P	8	Mark Smith	Fr

Head coach

- John Cooper
  (1st Year)

Coordinators/assistant coaches

- Jim Colletto
  Assistant Head Coach/Offensive Coordinator, Tackles and Tight Ends (1st Year)
- Bill Young
  Defensive Coordinator (1st Year)
- Gary Blackney
  Inside Linebackers (5th Year)
- Bill Dudley
  Quarterbacks (1st Year)
- Bert Hill
  Conditioning Coach (1st Year)
- Ron Hudson
  Running Backs (1st Year)
- Gene Huey
  Wide Receivers (1st Year)
- Harry Justvig
  Volunteer Assistant (1st Year)
- Steve Pederson
  Recruiting Coordinator (1st Year)
- Fred Pagac
  Outside Linebackers (7th Year)
- Bob Palcic
  Centers, Guards (3rd Year)
- Ron Zook
  Defensive Backs (1st Year)

Legend

- (C) Team captain
- (S) Suspended
- (I) Ineligible
- Injured
- Redshirt

Roster
Last update: 2016-Dec-02

== 1989 NFL draftees ==
Player	Round	Pick	Position	NFL club
Jeff Uhlenhake	5	121	Center	Miami Dolphins
Vince Workman	5	127	Running back	Green Bay Packers
Derek MacCready	9	226	Defensive end	Detroit Lions
Everett Ross	12	335	Wide receiver	Minnesota Vikings
