= 1988 Wisconsin Badgers football team =

American college football season

1988 Wisconsin Badgers football
- Conference: Big Ten Conference
- Record: 1–10 (1–7 Big Ten)
- Head coach: Don Morton (2nd season)
- Offensive coordinator: Pat Simmers (2nd season)
- Offensive scheme: Veer
- Defensive coordinator: Mike Daly (2nd season)
- Base defense: 3–4
- MVP: David Wings
- Captains: Todd Nelson; David Wings
- Home stadium: Camp Randall Stadium

1988 Big Ten Conference football standings
	Conf.					Overall
Team	W		L		T	W		L		T
No. 4 Michigan $	7	–	0	–	1	9	–	2	–	1
Michigan State	6	–	1	–	1	6	–	5	–	1
Illinois	5	–	2	–	1	6	–	5	–	1
Iowa	4	–	1	–	3	6	–	4	–	3
No. 20 Indiana	5	–	3	–	0	8	–	3	–	1
Purdue	3	–	5	–	0	4	–	7	–	0
Ohio State	2	–	5	–	1	4	–	6	–	1
Northwestern	2	–	5	–	1	2	–	8	–	1
Wisconsin	1	–	7	–	0	1	–	10	–	0
Minnesota	0	–	6	–	2	2	–	7	–	2
$ – Conference champion; Rankings from AP Poll

The 1988 Wisconsin Badgers football team represented the University of Wisconsin–Madison as a member of the Big Ten Conference during the 1988 NCAA Division I-A football season. Led by second-year head coach Don Morton, the Badgers compiled an overall record of 1–10 with a mark of 1–7 in conference play, placing ninth in the Big Ten. Wisconsin played home games at Camp Randall Stadium in Madison, Wisconsin.

== Schedule ==
Date	Opponent	Site	Result	Attendance	Source
September 3	Western Michigan*	Camp Randall Stadium; Madison, WI	L 14–24	38,230	
September 17	Northern Illinois*	Camp Randall Stadium; Madison, WI	L 17–19	46,869	
September 24	at No. 1 Miami (FL)*	Miami Orange Bowl; Miami, FL	L 3–23	48,311	
October 1	No. 19 Michigan	Camp Randall Stadium; Madison, WI	L 14–62	61,180	
October 8	at Iowa	Kinnick Stadium; Iowa City, IA (rivalry)	L 6–31	67,700	
October 15	Illinois	Camp Randall Stadium; Madison, WI	L 6–34	57,886	
October 22	at Northwestern	Dyche Stadium; Evanston, IL	L 14–35	30,013	
October 29	Purdue^{†}	Camp Randall Stadium; Madison, WI	L 6–9	51,147	
November 5	at Ohio State	Ohio Stadium; Columbus, OH	L 12–34	90,032	
November 12	Minnesota	Camp Randall Stadium; Madison, WI (rivalry)	W 14–7	40,467	
November 19	at Michigan State	Spartan Stadium; East Lansing, MI	L 0–36	76,372	
*Non-conference game; ^{†}Homecoming; Rankings from AP Poll released prior to the game

== Roster ==
1988 Wisconsin Badgers football team roster
Players
Coaches
Offense

Pos.	#	Name	Class
TE	88	Brian Anderson	Sr
RB	34	Marvin Artley	Sr
C	55	Jim Basten	So
WR	39	Scott Bestor	Sr
WR	3	David Burks	Sr
TE	9	Paul Chryst	Sr
QB	13	Lionell Crawford	Fr
QB	1	Otis Flowers	So
RB	4	Damone Freeman	Fr
TE	81	Craig Hudson	Sr
RB	32	Leon Hunt	Sr
C	66	Matt Joki	Sr
QB	14	Tony Lowery	So
RB	4	Damone Freeman	Fr
G	77	Joe Magazzeni	Jr
G	76	Jeff Miller	So
TE	89	Kerry Miller	So
OT	75	Todd Nelson (C)	Sr
OT	54	Tim Otto	Jr
RB	29	Fred Owens	Jr
WR	23	Shawn Peters	Sr
OT	71	Keith Peterson	Sr
OT	78	Brady Pierce	So
G	50	David Rapps	Jr
WR	26	James Ross	Sr
RB	22	Steve Vinci	Sr
WR	86	Bill Williams, Jr	Jr

Defense

Pos.	#	Name	Class
NG	92	Bill Antonie	Jr
NG	74	John Banaszak	Sr
DL, LB	94	Dan Batsch	So
DE	91	Don Davey	So
CB	7	Eddie Fletcher, Jr	Fr
LB	49	Victor Fortino	Sr
LB	30	Andy Hartlieb	Sr
LB	58	Malvin Hunter	So
DE	65	Leon Johnson	Jr
LB	41	Scott Johnson	Sr
DL, LB	44	Dan Kissling	Jr
DL, LB	93	Tim Knoeck	Sr
CB	37	Brad Mayo	Jr
LB	46	Robert Newell	So
S	8	Pete Nowka	Sr
LB	19	Paul Partington	Sr
S	25	Rafael Robinson	Fr
LB	36	Duer Sharp	Fr
S	27	Greg Thomas	So
DT	60	Chad Vande Zande	Sr
CB	26	Troy Vincent	Fr
S	10	Jeff Wagner	Sr
LB	63	Jeff Weyker	Sr
CB	21	LaMarr White	So
LB	48	David Wings (C)	Sr
DT	72	Jeff Wolf	Sr

Special teams

Pos.	#	Name	Class
P	20	Brad Brekke	So
P		Chris Heymans
K	9	Robb Mehring	So
K	18	Rich Thompson	Fr

Head coach

- Don Morton

Coordinators/assistant coaches

- Pat Simmers – Offensive Coordinator/Offensive Line
- Mike Daly – Defensive Coordinator/Defensive Backs
- Bob Babich – Offensive Line
- Craig Bohl – Inside Linebackers
- L. C. Cole – Outside Linebackers
- Phil Engle – Defensive Line
- Jimmy Gonzales – Defensive Line
- Mark Mauer – Tight Ends/Wide Receivers
- Scott Seeliger – Quarterbacks/Running Backs
- Ken Ellett – Director of Football Operations/Recruiting Coordinator
- Mario Russo – Administrative Assistant

Legend

- (C) Team captain
- (S) Suspended
- (I) Ineligible
- Injured
- Redshirt

== 1989 NFL draft ==
Player	Position	Round	Pick	NFL club
Todd Nelson	Guard	12	318	Phoenix Cardinals
