= Dave Haight =

American football player (born 1966)

Iowa Hawkeyes
- Position: Defensive tackle

Personal information
- Born: April 11, 1966; Dyersville, Iowa, U.S.

Career information
- College: Iowa (1985–1988)

Awards and highlights
- First-team All-American (1988); Big Ten Defensive Lineman of the Year (1987); 3× First-team All-Big Ten (1986, 1987, 1988)

Dave Haight (April 11, 1966) is an American former college football player for the University of Iowa. He was the Big Ten Defensive Lineman of the Year as a junior in 1987, and named a first team All-American in 1988.

== Playing career ==
Haight was a first team all-state football player at Beckman High School in Dyersville. He went to Iowa because his older brother, Mike Haight, was a star offensive lineman for the Hawkeyes.

Haight was a defensive lineman for four years with the Hawkeyes from 1985-1988. Haight was an all-Big Ten selection as a sophomore in 1986 and an honorable mention All-American after he recorded 99 tackles as a defensive lineman. As a junior in 1987, he led the team in tackles with 126 and set the school record for tackles by a defensive lineman. He was a second team All-American and the Big Ten’s Defensive Lineman of the Year; his brother Mike had been named the Big Ten’s Offensive Lineman of the Year two years earlier in 1985.

As a senior in 1988, Haight was named Iowa’s team captain for the second time. He had 111 tackles, becoming the only lineman in Iowa history to record over 100 tackles in two separate seasons. His 346 career tackles ranked fourth in Iowa history, and he was named first team All-American as a senior in 1988.

== Honors ==
Haight is one of only nine Hawkeyes to be named first team All-Big Ten three times. He and his brother, Mike, were both named to the Iowa High School Athletic Association Football Players Hall of Fame. In 1989, Iowa fans selected an all-time University of Iowa football team during the 100th anniversary celebration of Iowa football, and Dave Haight was selected as a defensive lineman.
