= 1988 Minnesota Golden Gophers football team =

American college football season

1988 Minnesota Golden Gophers football
- Conference: Big Ten Conference
- Record: 2–7–2 (0–6–2 Big Ten)
- Head coach: John Gutekunst (3rd season)
- Captains: Jason Bruce; Chuck McCree; Brian Williams
- Home stadium: Hubert H. Humphrey Metrodome

1988 Big Ten Conference football standings
	Conf.					Overall
Team	W		L		T	W		L		T
No. 4 Michigan $	7	–	0	–	1	9	–	2	–	1
Michigan State	6	–	1	–	1	6	–	5	–	1
Illinois	5	–	2	–	1	6	–	5	–	1
Iowa	4	–	1	–	3	6	–	4	–	3
No. 20 Indiana	5	–	3	–	0	8	–	3	–	1
Purdue	3	–	5	–	0	4	–	7	–	0
Ohio State	2	–	5	–	1	4	–	6	–	1
Northwestern	2	–	5	–	1	2	–	8	–	1
Wisconsin	1	–	7	–	0	1	–	10	–	0
Minnesota	0	–	6	–	2	2	–	7	–	2
$ – Conference champion; Rankings from AP Poll

The 1988 Minnesota Golden Gophers football team represented the University of Minnesota in the 1988 NCAA Division I-A football season. In their third year under head coach John Gutekunst, the Golden Gophers compiled a 2–7–2 record and were outscored by their opponents by a combined total of 246 to 195. The tie against Illinois was the last tie for the Golden Gophers and under current NCAA rules, it will be the last in Golden Gophers history.

Punter Brent Herbel was named All-Big Ten second team. Punter Brent Herbel and offensive lineman Brent Liimatta were named Academic All-Big Ten.

Wide receiver Chris Gaiters was awarded the Bronko Nagurski Award and the Bruce Smith Award. Gaiters was selected as a 3rd team All-American. Strong safety Joel Brown was awarded the Carl Eller Award. Brent Herbel was awarded the Bobby Bell Award. Defensive tackle Ross Ukkelberg was awarded the Butch Nash Award. Center Pat Hart was awarded the Paul Giel Award.

Total attendance for the season was 312,596, which averaged out to 44,657 per game. The season high for attendance was against rival Iowa.

== Schedule ==
Date	Time	Opponent	Site	TV	Result	Attendance	Source
September 10	7:00 pm	Washington State*	Hubert H. Humphrey Metrodome; Minneapolis, MN		L 9–41	40,071	
September 17	7:00 pm	Miami (OH)*	Hubert H. Humphrey Metrodome; Minneapolis, MN		W 35–3	39,343	
September 24	7:00 pm	Northern Illinois*	Hubert H. Humphrey Metrodome; Minneapolis, MN		W 31–20	40,007	
October 1	1:30 pm	at Purdue	Ross–Ade Stadium; West Lafayette, IN		L 10–14	61,805	
October 8	7:00 pm	Northwestern^{†}	Hubert H. Humphrey Metrodome; Minneapolis, MN	Raycom	T 28–28	44,566	
October 15	1:00 pm	at No. 18 Indiana	Memorial Stadium; Bloomington, IN		L 13–33	51,154	
October 22	7:00 pm	Ohio State	Hubert H. Humphrey Metrodome; Minneapolis, MN	Raycom	L 6–13	44,221	
October 29	7:00 pm	Illinois	Hubert H. Humphrey Metrodome; Minneapolis, MN		T 27–27	40,554	
November 5	2:30 pm	at No. 14 Michigan	Michigan Stadium; Ann Arbor, MI (Little Brown Jug)	ABC	L 7–22	102,171	
November 12	1:05 pm	at Wisconsin	Camp Randall Stadium; Madison, WI (rivalry)		L 7–14	40,467	
November 19	7:00 pm	Iowa	Hubert H. Humphrey Metrodome; Minneapolis, MN (rivalry)	Raycom	L 22–31	63,894	
*Non-conference game; ^{†}Homecoming; Rankings from AP Poll released prior to the game; All times are in Central time

== Personnel ==
1988 Minnesota Golden Gophers football team roster
Players
Coaches
Offense

Pos.	#	Name	Class
RB	42	Patrick Cummings	Jr
QB	14	Marquel Fleetwood	Fr
OT	65	Jon Melander	Jr
RB	39	Darrell Thompson	Jr
C	60	Chris Thome	So
WR	86	Pat Tinglehoff	So
C	63	Brian Williams	Sr

Defense

Pos.	#	Name	Class
DT	51	Bob Coughlin	So
DL	99	Kraig Hackbarth	Fr
DB	26	Sean Lumpkin	Fr
FS	25	Matt Sheldon	Fr
LB	94	Mac Stephens	Jr
FS	18	Paul Strong	Sr
LB	66	Bryan Suess	Jr
DT	79	Mike Sunvold	So
LB	96	Kevin Sutton	Fr
DT	77	Trint Trip	Sr
DT	90	Ross Ukkelberg	Sr

Special teams

Pos.	#	Name	Class

Head coach

- John Gutekunst

Coordinators/assistant coaches

Legend

- (C) Team captain
- (S) Suspended
- (I) Ineligible
- Injured
- Redshirt

Roster
