= Kurt Larson =

American football player (born 1966)

No. 59
- Position: Linebacker

Personal information
- Born: February 25, 1966 (age 60); Waukesha, Wisconsin, U.S.
- Listed height: 6 ft 4 in (1.93 m)
- Listed weight: 236 lb (107 kg)

Career information
- High school: Waukesha North
- College: Michigan State
- NFL draft: 1989: 8th round, 212th overall pick

Career history
- Indianapolis Colts (1989–1990); Green Bay Packers (1991)

Awards and highlights
- Second-team All-Big Ten (1988)

Career NFL statistics
- Sacks: 1
- Fumble recoveries: 2
- Stats at Pro Football Reference

Kurt Arvin Larson (born February 25, 1966) is an American former professional football player who was a linebacker in the National Football League (NFL). He played for the Indianapolis Colts from 1989 to 1990 and the Green Bay Packers in 1991. He was selected by the Colts in the eighth round of the 1989 NFL draft. He played college football for Michigan State Spartans.
