= 1988 Northwestern Wildcats football team =

American college football season

1988 Northwestern Wildcats football
- Conference: Big Ten Conference
- Record: 2–8–1 (2–5–1 Big Ten)
- Head coach: Francis Peay (3rd season)
- Captain: Greg Bradshaw
- Home stadium: Dyche Stadium

1988 Big Ten Conference football standings
	Conf.					Overall
Team	W		L		T	W		L		T
No. 4 Michigan $	7	–	0	–	1	9	–	2	–	1
Michigan State	6	–	1	–	1	6	–	5	–	1
Illinois	5	–	2	–	1	6	–	5	–	1
Iowa	4	–	1	–	3	6	–	4	–	3
No. 20 Indiana	5	–	3	–	0	8	–	3	–	1
Purdue	3	–	5	–	0	4	–	7	–	0
Ohio State	2	–	5	–	1	4	–	6	–	1
Northwestern	2	–	5	–	1	2	–	8	–	1
Wisconsin	1	–	7	–	0	1	–	10	–	0
Minnesota	0	–	6	–	2	2	–	7	–	2
$ – Conference champion; Rankings from AP Poll

The 1988 Northwestern Wildcats football team represented Northwestern University as a member of the Big Ten Conference during the 1988 NCAA Division I-A football season. Led by third-year head coach Francis Peay, the Wildcats compiled an overall record of 2–8–1 with a mark of 2–5–1 in conference play, tying for seventh place in the Big Ten. Northwestern played home games at Dyche Stadium in Evanston, Illinois.

== Schedule ==
Date	Time	Opponent	Site	TV	Result	Attendance	Source
September 3	6:00 pm	Duke*	Dyche Stadium; Evanston IL	SV	L 21–31	24,713	
September 17	1:00 pm	at Air Force*	Falcon Stadium; Colorado Springs, CO		L 27–62	42,612	
September 24	12:30 pm	at Army*	Michie Stadium; [West Point, NY		L 7–23	36,978	
October 1	11:00 am	Indiana	Dyche Stadium; Evanston, IL	ABC	L 17–48	27,113	
October 8	7:00 pm	at Minnesota	Hubert H. Humphrey Metrodome; Minneapolis, MN		T 28–28	44,566	
October 15	12:00 pm	at Michigan State	Spartan Stadium; East Lansing, MI		L 3–36	76,952	
October 22	1:00 pm	Wisconsin	Dyche Stadium; Evanston, IL		W 35–14	30,013	
October 29	1:00 pm	No. 14 Michigan	Dyche Stadium; Evanston, IL (rivalry)		L 7–52	33,647	
November 5	1:00 pm	at Iowa	Kinnick Stadium; Iowa City, IA		L 10–35	67,700	
November 12	1:00 pm	Purdue	Dyche Stadium; Evanston, IL		W 28–7	24,542	
November 19	1:00 pm	at Illinois	Memorial Stadium; Champaign, IL (rivalry)		L 9–14	42,329	
*Non-conference game; Rankings from AP Poll released prior to the game; All times are in Central time

== Season summary ==
=== Purdue ===
The win snapped a 12-game losing streak to Purdue, dating back to 1975.

== Personnel ==
1988 Northwestern Wildcats football team roster
Players
Coaches
Offense

Pos.	#	Name	Class
QB		Greg Bradshaw	Sr
RB		Bob Christian	So
RB		Byron Sanders	Sr

Defense

Pos.	#	Name	Class
DB	41	John Ivlow

Special teams

Pos.	#	Name	Class

Head coach

- Francis Peay

Coordinators/assistant coaches

Legend

- (C) Team captain
- (S) Suspended
- (I) Ineligible
- Injured
- Redshirt
