= 1988 Purdue Boilermakers football team =

American college football season

1988 Purdue Boilermakers football
- Conference: Big Ten Conference
- Record: 4–7 (3–5 Big Ten)
- Head coach: Fred Akers (2nd season)
- Offensive coordinator: Bob Stanley (2nd season)
- Defensive coordinator: Phil Bennett (2nd season)
- MVP: Marc Foster
- Captains: Bruce Crites; Marc Foster
- Home stadium: Ross–Ade Stadium

1988 Big Ten Conference football standings
	Conf.					Overall
Team	W		L		T	W		L		T
No. 4 Michigan $	7	–	0	–	1	9	–	2	–	1
Michigan State	6	–	1	–	1	6	–	5	–	1
Illinois	5	–	2	–	1	6	–	5	–	1
Iowa	4	–	1	–	3	6	–	4	–	3
No. 20 Indiana	5	–	3	–	0	8	–	3	–	1
Purdue	3	–	5	–	0	4	–	7	–	0
Ohio State	2	–	5	–	1	4	–	6	–	1
Northwestern	2	–	5	–	1	2	–	8	–	1
Wisconsin	1	–	7	–	0	1	–	10	–	0
Minnesota	0	–	6	–	2	2	–	7	–	2
$ – Conference champion; Rankings from AP Poll

The 1988 Purdue Boilermakers football team represented Purdue University as a member of the Big Ten Conference during the 1988 NCAA Division I-A football season. Led by second-year head coach Fred Akers, the Boilermakers compiled an overall record of 4–7 with a mark of 3–5 in conference play, placing sixth in the Big Ten. Purdue played home games at Ross–Ade Stadium in West Lafayette, Indiana.

== Schedule ==
Date	Opponent	Site	Result	Attendance	Source
September 10	No. 20 Washington*	Ross–Ade Stadium; West Lafayette, IN	L 6–20	56,125	
September 17	Ohio*	Ross–Ade Stadium; West Lafayette, IN	W 33–10	60,658	
September 24	at No. 8 Notre Dame*	Notre Dame Stadium; Notre Dame, IN (rivalry)	L 7–52	59,075	
October 1	Minnesota^{†}	Ross–Ade Stadium; West Lafayette, Indiana	W 14–10	61,805	
October 8	at Illinois	Memorial Stadium; Champaign, IL (rivalry)	L 0–20	63,743	
October 15	at Ohio State	Ohio Stadium; Columbus, OH	W 31–26	90,970	
October 22	Iowa	Ross–Ade Stadium; West Lafayette, Indiana	L 7–31	62,264	
October 29	at Wisconsin	Camp Randall Stadium; Madison, WI	W 9–6	51,147	
November 5	Michigan State	Ross–Ade Stadium; West Lafayette, IN	L 3–48	55,639	
November 12	at Northwestern	Dyche Stadium; Evanston, IL	L 7–28	24,542	
November 19	Indiana	Ross–Ade Stadium; West Lafayette, IN (Old Oaken Bucket)	L 7–52	67,861	
*Non-conference game; ^{†}Homecoming; Rankings from AP Poll released prior to the game

== Game summaries ==
=== At Ohio State ===
Purdue Boilermakers (2–3) at Ohio State Buckeyes (2–3)

Quarter	1	2	3	4	Total
Purdue	0	7	14	10	31
Ohio St	7	10	3	6	26

at Ohio Stadium, Columbus, Ohio

- Date: October 15
- Game time: 1:30 p.m. CDT
- Game weather: Partly sunny, 62 °F (17 °C)
- Game attendance: 90,970
- Referee: Jim Kemerling
- TV: WCMH
- Box Score

Game information

First quarter

- OSU – Carlos Snow 58-yard run (Pat O'Morrow kick), 9:32. Ohio St 7–0. Drive: 4 plays, 68 yards, 1:30.

Second quarter

- OSU – Greg Frey 1-yard run (Pat O'Morrow kick), 13:18. Ohio St 14–0. Drive: 12 plays, 86 yards, 5:13.
- PUR – Lance Scheib 46-yard pass from Brian Fox (Larry Sullivan kick), 10:52. Ohio St 14–7. Drive: 6 plays, 82 yards, 2:17.
- OSU – Pat O'Morrow 35-yard field goal, 0:48. Ohio St 17–7. Drive: 7 plays, 12 yards, 3:52.

Third quarter

- OSU – Pat O'Morrow 24-yard field goal, 10:22. Ohio St 20–7. Drive: 9 plays, 73 yards, 3:10.
- PUR – Ernie Schramayr 5-yard pass from Brian Fox (Larry Sullivan kick), 6:23. Ohio St 20–14. Drive: 9 plays, 67 yards, 3:54.
- PUR – Brian Fox 3-yard run (Larry Sullivan kick), 4:59. Purdue 21–20. Drive: 4 plays, 16 yards, 1:14.

Fourth quarter

- PUR – Ernie Schramayr 7-yard pass from Brian Fox (Larry Sullivan kick), 14:56. Purdue 28–20. Drive: 8 plays, 63 yards, 3:29.
- OSU – James Bryant 5-yard run (pass failed), 12:12. Purdue 28–26. Drive: 6 plays, 66 yards, 2:38.
- PUR – Larry Sullivan 49-yard field goal, 6:28. Purdue 31–26. Drive: 12 plays, 42 yards, 5:39.

Top passers

- PUR – Brian Fox – 19/27, 223 yards, 3 TD
- OSU – Greg Frey – 10/21, 193 yards, 2 INT

Top rushers

- PUR – Jarrett Scales – 21 rushes, 62 yards
- OSU – Carlos Snow – 20 rushes, 128 yards, TD

Top receivers

- PUR – Ernie Schramayr – 13 receptions, 106 yards, 2 TD
- OSU – Jeff Ellis – 3 receptions, 66 yards

- First road win for Fred Akers at Purdue
- First win at Columbus since 1967

External videos
- Local news sports report – Purdue beats Ohio State

== Roster ==
1988 Purdue Boilermakers football team roster
Players
Coaches
Offense

Pos.	#	Name	Class
QB		Scott Bell
OL		Bruce Brinerman
OL		Jason Cegielski
OL		Bruce Crites (C)
QB	16	Brian Fox	Fr
RB		Ray Graham
OL		Teko Johnson
QB		Mark Maschek
WR		Curtis McManus
WR		Todd Moore
FB	38	Mike Doctor	Fr
RB		Darren Myles
RB		Scott Nelson
TE	84	Dwayne O'Connor
RB		Jarrett Scales
WR	81	Lance Scheib
OL		Derick Schmidt
RB	34	Ernie Schramayr
RB		Jerome Sparkman
TE		Kelly Turner
WR	88	Calvin Williams

Defense

Pos.	#	Name	Class
DB		Ronnie Beeks
DB		Reggie Broussard
DL		Scott Conover
OL		Dennis Dotson
DB		Marc Foster (C)
DL		Bill Hitchcock
DB		Steve Jackson
DB		Terry Johnson
DB		Derrick Kelson
DL		Ken Kushner
DL		Donzel Leggett
LB		Jim Schwantz
LB		Tyrone Starks
LB		Darren Trieb
LB		Jerrol Williams

Special teams

Pos.	#	Name	Class
P, QB		Shawn McCarthy
K		Larry Sullivan

Head coach

- Fred Akers

Coordinators/assistant coaches

- Brian Cabral (ILB)
- Bill Kollar (DL/ST)
- Dan Lounsbury (RB/WR)
- Bill Michael (TE/OT)
- Mike Sanford Sr. (QB)

Legend

- (C) Team captain
- (S) Suspended
- (I) Ineligible
- Injured
- Redshirt

== Awards ==
- Brian Fox – Big Ten All-Freshman Team
