= 1988 Michigan State Spartans football team =

American college football season

1988 Michigan State Spartans football

Gator Bowl, L 27–34 vs. Georgia
- Conference: Big Ten Conference
- Record: 6–5–1 (6–1–1 Big Ten)
- Head coach: George Perles (6th season)
- Offensive coordinator: Morris Watts (3rd season)
- Defensive coordinator: Norm Parker (1st season)
- MVP: Kurt Larson
- Captains: Kurt Larson; Tony Mandarich; Bobby McAllister; John Miller
- Home stadium: Spartan Stadium

1988 Big Ten Conference football standings
| | Conf. | | | | | Overall |
| Team | W | | L | | T | W | | L | | T |
|---|---|---|---|---|---|---|---|---|---|---|
| No. 4 Michigan $ | 7 | – | 0 | – | 1 | 9 | – | 2 | – | 1 |
| Michigan State | 6 | – | 1 | – | 1 | 6 | – | 5 | – | 1 |
| Illinois | 5 | – | 2 | – | 1 | 6 | – | 5 | – | 1 |
| Iowa | 4 | – | 1 | – | 3 | 6 | – | 4 | – | 3 |
| No. 20 Indiana | 5 | – | 3 | – | 0 | 8 | – | 3 | – | 1 |
| Purdue | 3 | – | 5 | – | 0 | 4 | – | 7 | – | 0 |
| Ohio State | 2 | – | 5 | – | 1 | 4 | – | 6 | – | 1 |
| Northwestern | 2 | – | 5 | – | 1 | 2 | – | 8 | – | 1 |
| Wisconsin | 1 | – | 7 | – | 0 | 1 | – | 10 | – | 0 |
| Minnesota | 0 | – | 6 | – | 2 | 2 | – | 7 | – | 2 |
$ – Conference champion; Rankings from AP Poll

The 1988 Michigan State Spartans football team represented Michigan State University in the 1988 NCAA Division I-A football season. The Spartans played their home games at Spartan Stadium in East Lansing, Michigan and were coached by George Perles. The team finished second in the Big Ten Conference with a 6–1–1 conference record, and a 6–5–1 overall record. Michigan State was invited to the 1989 Gator Bowl, losing to Georgia 27–34.

== Schedule ==
| Date | Time | Opponent | Rank | Site | TV | Result | Attendance | Source |
|---|---|---|---|---|---|---|---|---|
| September 10 | 1:00 p.m. | Rutgers* | No. 15 | Spartan Stadium; East Lansing, MI | | L 13–17 | 70,693 | |
| September 17 | 12:00 p.m. | No. 8 Notre Dame* | | Spartan Stadium; East Lansing, MI (rivalry) | ABC | L 3–20 | 77,472 | |
| September 24 | 4:00 p.m. | at No. 9 Florida State* | | Doak Campbell Stadium; Tallahassee, FL | ESPN | L 7–30 | 61,757 | |
| October 1 | 3:30 p.m. | Iowa | | Spartan Stadium; East Lansing, MI | ABC | T 10–10 | 76,348 | |
| October 8 | 12:15 p.m. | at No. 17 Michigan | | Michigan Stadium; Ann Arbor, MI (rivalry) | | L 3–17 | 106,208 | |
| October 15 | 1:00 p.m. | Northwestern^{†} | | Spartan Stadium; East Lansing, MI | | W 36–3 | 76,952 | |
| October 22 | 2:00 p.m. | at Illinois | | Memorial Stadium; Champaign, IL | | W 28–21 | 65,771 | |
| October 29 | 12:15 p.m. | Ohio State | | Spartan Stadium; East Lansing, MI | | W 20–10 | 77,111 | |
| November 5 | 1:30 p.m. | at Purdue | | Ross–Ade Stadium; West Lafayette, IN | | W 48–3 | 55,639 | |
| November 12 | 3:30 p.m. | at Indiana | | Memorial Stadium; Bloomington, IN (rivalry) | ABC | W 38–12 | 50,738 | |
| November 19 | 1:00 p.m. | Wisconsin | | Spartan Stadium; East Lansing, MI | | W 36–0 | 76,372 | |
| January 1, 1989 | 8:00 p.m. | vs. No. 19 Georgia* | | Gator Bowl Stadium; Jacksonville, FL (Gator Bowl) | ESPN | L 27–34 | 76,236 | |
*Non-conference game; ^{†}Homecoming; Rankings from AP Poll released prior to the game; All times are in Eastern time

== Roster ==
1988 Michigan State Spartans football team roster
Players
Coaches
Offense

| Pos. | # | Name | Class |
|---|---|---|---|
| WR | 17 | Willie Bouyer | Sr |
| QB | 4 | Dan Enos | So |
| RB | 26 | Blake Ezor | Jr |
| OT | 79 | Tony Mandarich | Sr |
| OT | 77 | Eric Moten | So |
| WR | 1 | Andre Rison | Sr |
| OT | 71 | Kevin Robbins | Sr |
| FB | 29 | Duane Young | So |

Defense

| Pos. | # | Name | Class |
|---|---|---|---|
| CB | 36 | Harlon Barnett | Jr |
| DB | 9 | Mike Iaquaniello | So |
| LB | 51 | Carlos Jenkins | So |
| LB | 3 | Kurt Larson | Sr |
| SS | | John Miller | Sr |
| LB | 48 | Percy Snow | Jr |
| DE | 91 | Jim Szymanski | Jr |
| LB | 66 | Matt Vanderbeck | Jr |

Special teams

| Pos. | # | Name | Class |

Head coach

- George Perles

Coordinators/assistant coaches

Legend

- (C) Team captain
- (S) Suspended
- (I) Ineligible
- Injured
- Redshirt

== 1989 NFL draft ==
The following players were selected in the 1989 NFL draft.

| Player | Round | Pick | Position | NFL team |
|---|---|---|---|---|
| Tony Mandarich | 1 | 2 | Tackle | Green Bay Packers |
| Andre Rison | 1 | 22 | Wide receiver | Indianapolis Colts |
| Kevin Robbins | 3 | 75 | Tackle | Los Angeles Rams |
| Kurt Larson | 8 | 212 | Linebacker | Indianapolis Colts |
