= 1988 Indiana Hoosiers football team =

American college football season

1988 Indiana Hoosiers football

Liberty Bowl champion

Liberty Bowl, W 34–10 vs. South Carolina
- Conference: Big Ten Conference

Ranking
- Coaches: No. 19
- AP: No. 20
- Record: 8–3–1 (5–3 Big Ten)
- Head coach: Bill Mallory (5th season)
- Defensive coordinator: Joe Novak (5th season)
- MVP: Anthony Thompson
- Captains: Joe Huff; Don Shrader
- Home stadium: Memorial Stadium

1988 Big Ten Conference football standings
	Conf.					Overall
Team	W		L		T	W		L		T
No. 4 Michigan $	7	–	0	–	1	9	–	2	–	1
Michigan State	6	–	1	–	1	6	–	5	–	1
Illinois	5	–	2	–	1	6	–	5	–	1
Iowa	4	–	1	–	3	6	–	4	–	3
No. 20 Indiana	5	–	3	–	0	8	–	3	–	1
Purdue	3	–	5	–	0	4	–	7	–	0
Ohio State	2	–	5	–	1	4	–	6	–	1
Northwestern	2	–	5	–	1	2	–	8	–	1
Wisconsin	1	–	7	–	0	1	–	10	–	0
Minnesota	0	–	6	–	2	2	–	7	–	2
$ – Conference champion; Rankings from AP Poll

The 1988 Indiana Hoosiers football team represented Indiana University Bloomington as a member of the Big Ten Conference during the 1988 NCAA Division I-A football season. Led by fifth-year head coach Bill Mallory, the Hoosiers compiled an overall record of 8–3–1 with a mark of 5–3 in conference play, placing fifth in the Big Ten. Indiana was invited to the Liberty Bowl, where they beat South Carolina. The team played home games at Memorial Stadium in Bloomington, Indiana.

== Schedule ==
Date	Time	Opponent	Rank	Site	TV	Result	Attendance	Source
September 10	2:00 p.m.	at Rice*		Rice Stadium; Houston, TX		W 41–14	17,300	
September 17	2:00 p.m.	Kentucky*		Memorial Stadium; Bloomington, IN (rivalry)		W 36–15	51,077	
September 24	2:30 p.m.	at Missouri*		Faurot Field; Columbia, MO		T 28–28	41,053	
October 1	2:00 p.m.	at Northwestern		Dyche Stadium; Evanston, IL		W 48–17	27,113	
October 8	3:30 p.m.	Ohio State		Memorial Stadium; Bloomington, IN	ABC	W 41–7	52,133	
October 15	2:00 p.m.	Minnesota^{†}	No. 18	Memorial Stadium; Bloomington, IN		W 33–13	51,154	
October 22	3:30 p.m.	at No. 20 Michigan	No. 14	Michigan Stadium; Ann Arbor, MI	ABC	L 6–31	106,104	
October 29	3:30 p.m.	Iowa		Memorial Stadium; Bloomington, IN	ABC	W 45–34	52,128	
November 5	12:00 p.m.	at Illinois	No. 20	Memorial Stadium; Champaign, IL (rivalry)	ABC	L 20–21	66,201	
November 12	3:30 p.m.	Michigan State		Memorial Stadium; Bloomington, IN (rivalry)	ABC	L 12–38	50,738	
November 19	2:00 p.m.	at Purdue		Ross–Ade Stadium; West Lafayette, IN (Old Oaken Bucket)		W 52–7	67,861	
December 28	8:00 p.m.	vs. South Carolina*		Liberty Bowl Memorial Stadium; Memphis, TN (Liberty Bowl)	JPS	W 34–10	39,210	
*Non-conference game; ^{†}Homecoming; Rankings from AP Poll released prior to the game; All times are in Eastern time

== Game summaries ==
=== Purdue ===
Anthony Thompson rushed 25 times for 167 yards and three touchdowns while breaking the school's career rushing record.

== Personnel ==
1988 Indiana Hoosiers football team roster
Players
Coaches
Offense

Pos.	#	Name	Class
QB, P		Tony Bolyard
RB		Gene Boyd
WR		Tony Buford
WR		Darryl Eddings
OL		Jeff Fryar
WR		Gary Gooden
RB	17	Markell Granderson
RB		Matt Hansen
TE		Tim Jordan
TE		Carlos Marte
RB		Troy Mason
RB		Don Matejko
RB		Calvert Miller
WR		Tom Padgett
OL		Tim Radtke
QB	11	Dave Schnell	Jr
OL		Don Shrader
OL		Chris Simons
WR		Eddie Thomas
RB	32	Anthony Thompson	Jr
QB		Jeff Thornton
OL		Phil Trinter
WR		Rob Turner
OL		Ron Vargo
RB		Barry Way

Defense

Pos.	#	Name	Class
LB		Willie Bates
DL		Dan Bauer
DB		Erick Coleman
DB		Brian Dewitz
DB		Mike Dumas
DB		Marc Ferry
DB		Andre Hall
DL		Walt Harris
LB		Joe Huff
LB		Brad Money
DL		Jim Sams
LB		Terry Saunders
DL		Doug Schlereth
LB		Paul Williams

Special teams

Pos.	#	Name	Class
P		Macky Smith
K		Pete Stoyanovich	Sr

Head coach

- Bill Mallory

Coordinators/assistant coaches

Legend

- (C) Team captain
- (S) Suspended
- (I) Ineligible
- Injured
- Redshirt

== Awards and honors ==
- Anthony Thompson, Big Ten Player of the Year
- Anthony Thompson, Chicago Tribune Silver Football

== 1989 NFL draftees ==
Player	Position	Round	Pick	NFL club
Pete Stoyanovich	Kicker	8	203	Miami Dolphins
Gary Gooden	Defensive back	9	235	Los Angeles Raiders

- Anthony Thompson was drafted in the 1990 NFL draft.
