= 1988 Peach Bowl (December) =

American college football game

- 21st Peach Bowl
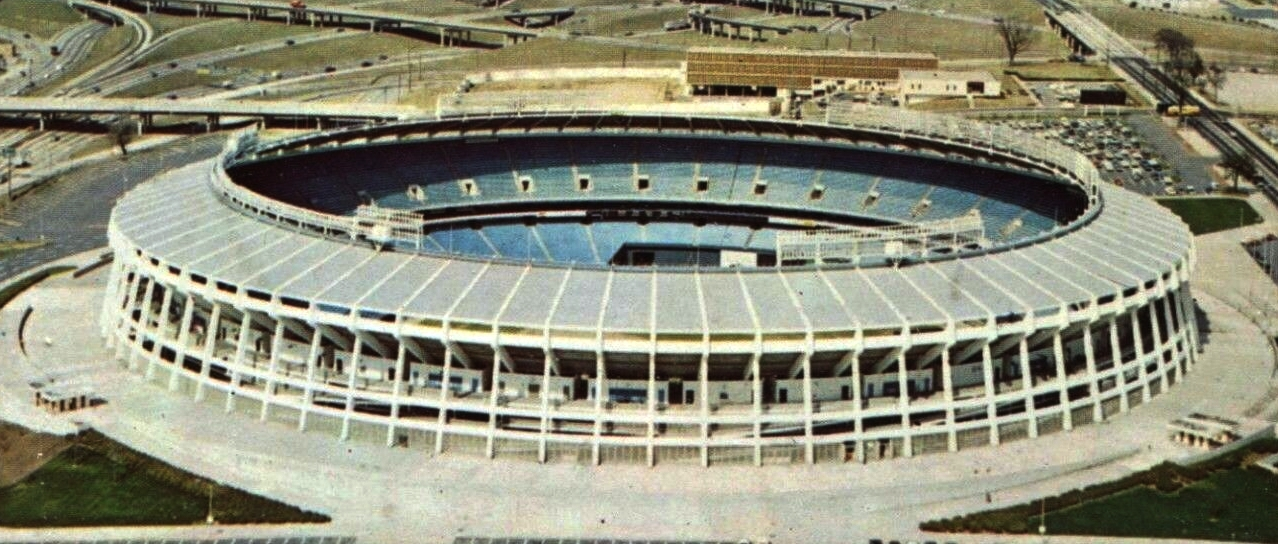
- Atlanta–Fulton County Stadium in Atlanta, Georgia, hosted the Peach Bowl.
Iowa Hawkeyes	NC State Wolfpack
(6–3–3)	(7–3–1)
Big Ten	ACC
23	28
Head coach: Hayden Fry	Head coach: Dick Sheridan
	1	2	3	4	Total
Iowa	3	7	7	6	23
NC State	7	21	0	0	28
- Date: December 31, 1988
- Season: 1988
- Stadium: Atlanta–Fulton County Stadium
- Location: Atlanta, GA
- MVP: Shane Montgomery (NC State QB); Michael Brooks (NC State S)
- Referee: Nick Define (MAC)
- Attendance: 44,635

United States TV coverage
- Network: Mizlou
- Announcers: Ray Scott and Ed Biles

The 1988 Peach Bowl, part of the 1988 bowl season, took place on December 31, 1988, at Atlanta–Fulton County Stadium in Atlanta, Georgia. The competing teams were the Iowa Hawkeyes, representing the Big Ten Conference, and the NC State Wolfpack of the Atlantic Coast Conference (ACC). In the second meeting between the schools, NC State was victorious by a final score of 28–23.

== Teams ==
=== Iowa ===
The Iowa Hawkeyes kicked off the 1988 season with a #9 preseason ranking. With two losses in their first three games, Iowa fell out of the rankings for good. The Hawkeyes finished conference play with only one loss, but endured three ties to finish the regular season at 6-3-3 and 4-1-3 in Big Ten play.

=== NC State ===
The Wolfpack finished 3rd in the ACC, and handed conference champion Clemson its only league loss. The team finished ranked #18 in the final Coaches' Poll.

== Game summary ==
This installment of the Peach Bowl was played through a steady rain. The teams combined for 14 turnovers (7 each) and 12 fumbles (8 lost). The sloppy conditions were a factor from the start, as NC State's Lee Knight recovered a fumble by Iowa's Chet Davis on the game's opening kickoff. The Hawkeye defense made it tough, but the Wolfpack capitalized four plays later on Charles Davenport's touchdown plunge on 4th and goal. Iowa managed a field goal later in the opening stanza to bring the score to 7–3.

NC State exploded for three touchdowns in the second quarter to take a 28–3 lead. Danny Peebles outran the coverage and caught a 75-yard bomb from Shane Montgomery on the quarter's first play, then Tyrone Jackson added two touchdown runs to stretch the lead. The Wolfpack scored 21 points on touchdown runs following Iowa fumbles. In all, the Hawkeyes committed five first-half turnovers. Iowa managed a touchdown before half to close the gap to 28–10.

Scoring slowed in the second half due to deteriorating field conditions, though Iowa continued to fight with a touchdown in each of the final two quarters.

In the loss, Chuck Hartlieb set a Peach Bowl record with 428 passing yards. He completed 30 of 51 pass attempts for 3 touchdowns, but was intercepted 4 times – 3 of those by Defensive MVP Michael Brooks.

Scoring summary

Quarter	Time	Drive			Team	Scoring information	Score	
Quarter	Time	Plays	Yards	TOP	Team	Scoring information	Iowa	NC State
1		4	3		NC State	Charles Davenport 1-yard touchdown run, Damon Hartman kick good	0	7
1					Iowa	30-yard field goal by George Murphy	3	7
2					NC State	Danny Peebles 75-yard touchdown reception from Shane Montgomery, Damon Hartman kick good	3	14
2		5	27		NC State	Tyrone Jackson 2-yard touchdown run, Damon Hartman kick good	3	21
2	10:37	7	72		NC State	Tyrone Jackson 30-yard touchdown run, Damon Hartman kick good	3	28
2			40		Iowa	Deven Harberts 8-yard touchdown reception from Chuck Hartlieb, George Murphy kick good	10	28
3					Iowa	Deven Harberts 22-yard touchdown reception from Chuck Hartlieb, George Murphy kick good	17	28
4	0:08				Iowa	Sean Smith 7-yard touchdown reception from Chuck Hartlieb, 2-point pass failed	23	28
"TOP" = time of possession. For other American football terms, see Glossary of American football.							23	28
