= 1988 Michigan Wolverines football team =

American college football season

1988 Michigan Wolverines football

Big Ten champion Rose Bowl champion

Rose Bowl, W 22–14 vs. USC
- Conference: Big Ten Conference

Ranking
- Coaches: No. 4
- AP: No. 4
- Record: 9–2–1 (7–0–1 Big Ten)
- Head coach: Bo Schembechler (20th season)
- Offensive coordinator: Gary Moeller (2nd season)
- Defensive coordinator: Lloyd Carr (2nd season)
- MVP: Mark Messner
- Captains: Mark Messner; John Vitale
- Home stadium: Michigan Stadium

1988 Big Ten Conference football standings
	Conf.					Overall
Team	W		L		T	W		L		T
No. 4 Michigan $	7	–	0	–	1	9	–	2	–	1
Michigan State	6	–	1	–	1	6	–	5	–	1
Illinois	5	–	2	–	1	6	–	5	–	1
Iowa	4	–	1	–	3	6	–	4	–	3
No. 20 Indiana	5	–	3	–	0	8	–	3	–	1
Purdue	3	–	5	–	0	4	–	7	–	0
Ohio State	2	–	5	–	1	4	–	6	–	1
Northwestern	2	–	5	–	1	2	–	8	–	1
Wisconsin	1	–	7	–	0	1	–	10	–	0
Minnesota	0	–	6	–	2	2	–	7	–	2
$ – Conference champion; Rankings from AP Poll

The 1988 Michigan Wolverines football team was an American football team that represented the University of Michigan as a member of the Big Ten Conference during the 1988 NCAA Division I-A football season. In its 20th season under head coach Bo Schembechler, the team compiled a 9–2–1 record (7–0–1 against conference opponents), won the Big Ten championship, defeated USC in the 1989 Rose Bowl, outscored opponents by a total of 361 to 167, and was ranked No. 4 in the final AP and UPI polls.

The team's statistical leaders included quarterback Michael Taylor with 957 passing yards, tailback Tony Boles with 1,408 rushing yards, and split end Greg McMurtry with 470 receiving yards, and placekicker Mike Gillette with 97 points scored.

Two Michigan players received first-team honors on the 1988 All-America college football team: center John Vitale (consensus) and defensive tackle Mark Messner (consensus). Seven Michigan players received first-team honors on the 1988 All-Big Ten Conference football team.

== Schedule ==
Date	Time	Opponent	Rank	Site	TV	Result	Attendance	Source
September 10	9:00 p.m.	at No. 13 Notre Dame*	No. 9	Notre Dame Stadium; Notre Dame, IN (rivalry)	CBS	L 17–19	59,075	
September 17	3:30 p.m.	No. 1 Miami (FL)*	No. 15	Michigan Stadium; Ann Arbor, MI	ABC	L 30–31	105,834	
September 24	1:00 p.m.	Wake Forest*	No. 19	Michigan Stadium; Ann Arbor, MI		W 19–9	102,776	
October 1	2:00 p.m.	at Wisconsin	No. 19	Camp Randall Stadium; Madison, WI		W 62–14	61,180	
October 8	12:00 p.m.	Michigan State	No. 17	Michigan Stadium; Ann Arbor, MI (rivalry)	Big 10 Synd.	W 17–3	106,208	
October 15	3:30 p.m.	at Iowa	No. 15	Kinnick Stadium; Iowa City, IA	ABC	T 17–17	67,700	
October 22	3:30 p.m.	No. 14 Indiana^{†}	No. 20	Michigan Stadium; Ann Arbor, MI	ABC	W 31–6	106,104	
October 29	2:00 p.m.	at Northwestern	No. 14	Dyche Stadium; Evanston, IL (rivalry)		W 52–7	33,647	
November 5	3:30 p.m.	Minnesota	No. 14	Michigan Stadium; Ann Arbor, MI (Little Brown Jug)	ABC	W 22–7	102,171	
November 12	1:00 p.m.	Illinois	No. 13	Michigan Stadium; Ann Arbor, MI (rivalry)		W 38–9	105,714	
November 19	12:00 p.m.	at Ohio State	No. 12	Ohio Stadium; Columbus, OH (The Game)	ABC	W 34–31	90,176	
January 2, 1989	5:00 p.m.	vs. No. 5 USC*	No. 11	Rose Bowl; Pasadena, CA (Rose Bowl)	ABC	W 22–14	101,688	
*Non-conference game; ^{†}Homecoming; Rankings from AP Poll released prior to the game; All times are in Eastern time

== Rankings ==
Ranking movements Legend: ██ Increase in ranking ██ Decrease in ranking RV = Received votes ( ) = First-place votes
	Week																
Poll	Pre	1	2	3	4	5	6	7	8	9	10	11	12	13	14	15	Final
AP	11	10	9	15	19	19	17	15	20	14	14	13	12	11	11	11	4
Coaches	10 (1)	10 (1)	10	16	RV	20	20	17	RV	14	13	12	11	10	11	11	4

== Game summaries ==
=== At Notre Dame ===
Team	1	2	3	4	Total
#9 Michigan	0	7	7	3	17
• #13 Notre Dame	10	3	0	6	19

- Date: September 10
- Location: Notre Dame Stadium, South Bend, Indiana
- Television network: CBS

Scoring summary
1		ND	Watters 81-yard punt return (Ho kick)	ND 7-0
1		ND	Ho 31-yard field goal	ND 10-0
2		ND	Ho 38-yard field goal	ND 13-0
2		MICH	Hoard 1-yard run (Gillette kick)	ND 13-7
3		MICH	Taylor 1-yard run (Gillette kick)	MICH 14-13
4		ND	Ho 26-yard field goal	ND 16-14
4		MICH	Gillette 49-yard field goal	MICH 17-16
4	1:13	ND	Ho 26-yard field goal	ND 19-17

=== Miami (FL) ===
Team	1	2	3	4	Total
• #1 Miami (FL)	7	7	0	17	31
#15 Michigan	3	17	3	7	30

- Date: September 17
- Location: Michigan Stadium, Ann Arbor, Michigan
- Game attendance: 105,834

Scoring summary
1		Michigan	Mike Gillette 22-yard field goal	Michigan 3-0
1		Miami (FL)	Cleveland Gary 49-yard pass from Steve Walsh (Carlos Huerta kick)	Miami (FL) 7-3
2		Michigan	Mike Gillette 30-yard field goal	Miami (FL) 7-6
2		Miami (FL)	Cleveland Gary 1-yard run (Carlos Huerta kick)	Miami (FL) 14-6
2		Michigan	Jeffrey Brown 5-yard pass from Michael Taylor (pass failed)	Miami (FL) 14-12
2		Michigan	John Kolesar 18-yard pass from Michael Taylor (Chris Horn run)	Michigan 20-14
3		Michigan	Mike Gillette 29-yard field goal	Michigan 23-14
4		Michigan	Chris Calloway 16-yard pass from Michael Taylor (Mike Gillette kick)	Michigan 30-14
4	5:23	Miami (FL)	Rob Chudzinski 7-yard pass from Steve Walsh (Dale Dawkins pass from Steve Walsh)	Michigan 30-22
4	2:58	Miami (FL)	Cleveland Gary 48-yard pass from Steve Walsh (pass failed)	Michigan 30-28
4	0:43	Miami (FL)	Carlos Huerta 29-yard field goal	Miami (FL) 31-30

=== Wake Forest ===
Win 19-9

- Tony Boles 33 Rush, 213 Yds

=== Michigan State ===
Kicker Mike Gillette scored on a 40-yard fake punt run, a play that was put in during halftime, and kicked a 30-yard field goal as Michigan's defense registered five sacks and an interception against the winless Spartans.

=== At Iowa ===
Team	1	2	3	4	Total
Michigan	3	7	7	0	17
Iowa	7	10	0	0	17

- Date: October 15
- Location: Kinnick Stadium, Iowa City, Iowa
- Game attendance: 67,700
- Television network: ABC

Scoring summary
1	IOWA	Cook 5-yard pass from Hartlieb (Skillett kick)	IOWA 7–0
1	Mich	Gillette 43-yard field goal	IOWA 7–3
2	IOWA	Skillett 32-yard field goal	IOWA 10–3
2	IOWA	Hudson 5-yard run (Skillett kick)	IOWA 17–3
2	Mich	Taylor 5-yard run (Gillette kick)	IOWA 17–10
3	Mich	Kolesar 24-yard pass from Taylor (Gillette kick)	Tied 17–17

A 17-17 tie at Kinnick Stadium was the lone blemish on an otherwise perfect Big Ten season for the Wolverines.

=== Ohio State ===
Michigan Wolverines at Ohio State Buckeyes

Quarter	1	2	3	4	Total
Michigan	10	10	0	14	34
Ohio St	0	0	14	17	31

at Ohio Stadium, Columbus, Ohio

- Date: November 19, 1988
- Game time: 12:10 p.m.
- Game weather: Overcast, 44 °F (7 °C)
- Game attendance: 90,176
- Referee: John Nealow

Game information

First quarter

- MICH – Mike Gillette 22-yard field goal, 5:47. Michigan 3–0. Drive: 12 plays, 74 yards, 4:09.
- MICH – Greg McMurtry 57-yard pass from Demetrius Brown (Mike Gillette kick), 1:06. Michigan 10–0. Drive: 4 plays, 72 yards, 1:44.

Second quarter

- MICH – Leroy Hoard 18-yard run (Mike Gillette kick), 8:35. Michigan 17–0. Drive: 2 plays, 17 yards, 0:53.
- MICH – Mike Gillette 56-yard field goal, 0:00. Michigan 20–0. Drive: 5 plays, 36 yards, 2:35.

Third quarter

- OSU – Carlos Snow 4-yard run (Pat O'Morrow kick), 12:06. Michigan 20–7. Drive: 7 plays, 70 yards, 2:48.
- OSU – Bill Matlock 9-yard run (Pat O'Morrow kick), 4:59. Michigan 20–14. Drive: 8 plays, 66 yards, 3:08.

Fourth quarter

- OSU – Bobby Olive 4-yard pass from Greg Frey (Pat O'Morrow kick), 11:26. Ohio St 21–20. Drive: 8 plays, 90 yards, 3:42.
- OSU – Pat O'Morrow 21-yard field goal, 8:30. Ohio St 24–20. Drive: 6 plays, 18 yards, 2:50.
- MICH – Leroy Hoard 8-yard run (Mike Gillette kick), 4:20. Michigan 27–24. Drive: 10 plays, 76 yards, 4:03.
- OSU – Bill Matlock 16-yard run (Pat O'Morrow kick), 2:02. Ohio St 31–27. Drive: 6 plays, 92 yards, 2:12.
- MICH – John Kolesar 41-yard pass from Demetrius Brown (Mike Gillette kick), 1:37. Michigan 34–31. Drive: 2 plays, 41 yards, 0:15.

Top passers

- MICH – Demetrius Brown – 11/17, 223 yards, 2 TD
- OSU – Greg Frey – 14/29, 192 yards, TD, INT

Top rushers

- MICH – Leroy Hoard – 23 rushes, 158 yards, 2 TD
- OSU – Carlos Snow – 21 rushes, 170 yards, TD

Top receivers

- MICH – John Kolesar – 3 receptions, 95 yards, TD
- OSU – Bobby Olive – 3 receptions, 59 yards, TD

=== Vs. USC (Rose Bowl) ===
Rose Bowl

Team	1	2	3	4	Total
• Michigan	3	0	6	13	22
USC	0	14	0	0	14

- Date: January 2
- Location: Rose Bowl, Pasadena, California
- Game attendance: 101,688
- Referee: Gordon Riese
- TV announcers (ABC): Keith Jackson, Bob Griese

== Players ==
=== Roster ===
1988 Michigan Wolverines football team roster
Players
Coaches
Offense

Pos.	#	Name	Class
RB	46	Tony Boles	Jr
FB	32	Jarrod Bunch	Jr
WR	2	Chris Calloway	Jr
OT	63	Doug Daugherty	Jr
OT	73	Tom Dohring	Fr
RB	33	Leroy Hoard	Jr
WR	21	Desmond Howard	Fr
WR	1	Greg McMurtry	Jr
TE	90	Keith Mitchell	Sr
OT	75	Greg Skrepenak	So
QB	9	Michael Taylor	Sr
C	67	John Vitale	Sr
TE	89	Derrick Walker	Jr

Defense

Pos.	#	Name	Class
DB	24	Bobby Abrams	Jr
OLB	37	Erick Anderson	So
DB	15	David Arnold	Sr
S	43	Corwin Brown	Fr
DT	61	Mike Evans	So
DT	99	Chris Hutchinson	Fr
ILB	39	Curt Mallory	Fr
DT	60	Mark Messner	Sr
MG	91	Mike Teeter	Jr

Special teams

Pos.	#	Name	Class

Head coach

- Bo Schembechler

Coordinators/assistant coaches

Legend

- (C) Team captain
- (S) Suspended
- (I) Ineligible
- Injured
- Redshirt

Roster

=== Offense ===
- Tony Boles – started 10 games at tailback (team's leading rusher in 1988 with 1,408 yards)
- Demetrius Brown – started 3 games at quarterback (48 of 84 for 775 passing yards)
- Jeffrey Brown – started 11 games at tight end
- Jarrod Bunch – started 5 games at fullback
- Chris Calloway – started 5 games at flanker and 1 game at split end (led team with 4 touchdown catches)
- Dave Chester – started 2 games at left guard
- Dean Dingman – started 12 games at right guard
- Tom Dohring – started 10 games at left tackle
- Leroy Hoard – started 6 games at fullback and 1 game at tailback (team's second leading rusher in 1988 with 752 yards)
- Chris Horn – started 1 game at fullback
- Mike Husar – started 10 games at left guard and 2 games at left tackle
- John Kolesar – started 7 games at flanker (team's second leading receiver with 18 catches for 356 yards)
- Greg McMurtry – started 10 games at split end (team's leading receiver with 27 catches for 470 yards)
- Greg Skrepenak – started 12 games at right tackle
- Michael Taylor – started 9 games at quarterback (65 for 122 for 957 passing yards)
- John Vitale – started 12 games at center
- Derrick Walker – started 1 game at tight end and 1 game at split end
- Tracy Williams – started 1 game at tailback

=== Defense ===
- Bobby Abrams – started 12 games at outside linebacker
- Erick Anderson – started 6 games at inside linebacker (led team with 77 tackles)
- David Arnold – started 10 games at cornerback
- Mike Evans – started 1 game at defensive tackle
- J. J. Grant – started 9 games at inside linebacker (tied for second on the team with 72 tackles)
- Mark Gutzwiller, defensive back
- John Hermann – started 2 games at defensive tackle
- David Key – started 12 games at cornerback (fifth on the team with 63 tackles)
- Alex Marshall – started 9 games at outside linebacker
- Mark Messner – started 12 games at defensive tackle (fourth on the team with 70 tackles)
- Anthony Mitchell – started 1 game at outside linebacker
- Vada Murray – started 12 games at free safety (second on team with 4 interceptions)
- T. J. Osman – started 12 games at middle guard
- Todd Plate – started 2 games at cornerback
- Marc Spencer – started 3 games at inside linebacker
- Tripp Welborne – started 12 games at strong safety (led team with five interceptions; tied for second on the team with 72 tackles)
- Brent White – started 9 games at defensive tackle
- Tim Williams – started 2 games at outside linebacker

=== Special teams ===
- Tony Boles – kick off returns (14 returns for an average of 24.1 yards)
- Mike Gillette – placekicker (18 of 27 on field goals) and punter (46 punts for an average of 39.9 yards)
- Gulam Khan – placekicker (0 for 1 on field goals)
- John Kolesar – kickoff returns (13 returns for an average of 23.5 yards); punt returns (17 returns for an average of 11.9 yards)

== Awards and honors ==
- All-Americans: Mark Messner, John Vitale
- All-Conference: Mark Messner, John Vitale, Mike Husar, John Kolesar, Tony Boles, Mike Gillette, David Arnold
- Most Valuable Player: Mark Messner
- Meyer Morton Award: John Vitale
- John Maulbetsch Award: Tripp Welborne
- Frederick Matthei Award: Warde Manuel
- Arthur Robinson Scholarship Award: David Weil
- Dick Katcher Award: Mark Messner
- Hugh Rader Jr. Award: Mark Messner
- Robert P. Ufer Award: John Kolesar

== Coaching staff ==
- Head coach: Bo Schembechler
- Assistant coaches: Tirrel Burton, Cam Cameron, Lloyd Carr, Jerry Hanlon, Bill Harris, Jim Herrmann, Les Miles, Gary Moeller, Bobby Morrison, Tom Reed
- Trainer: Russ Miller
- Manager: Pat Perkins, Scott Boyle
