= 1988 Illinois Fighting Illini football team =

American college football season

1988 Illinois Fighting Illini football

All-American Bowl, L 10–14 vs. Florida
- Conference: Big Ten Conference
- Record: 6–5–1 (5–2–1 Big Ten)
- Head coach: John Mackovic (1st season)
- Offensive coordinator: Gene Dahlquist (1st season)
- Defensive coordinator: Lou Tepper (1st season)
- MVP: Keith Jones
- Captains: Glenn Cobb; Mark McGowan
- Home stadium: Memorial Stadium

1988 Big Ten Conference football standings
	Conf.					Overall
Team	W		L		T	W		L		T
No. 4 Michigan $	7	–	0	–	1	9	–	2	–	1
Michigan State	6	–	1	–	1	6	–	5	–	1
Illinois	5	–	2	–	1	6	–	5	–	1
Iowa	4	–	1	–	3	6	–	4	–	3
No. 20 Indiana	5	–	3	–	0	8	–	3	–	1
Purdue	3	–	5	–	0	4	–	7	–	0
Ohio State	2	–	5	–	1	4	–	6	–	1
Northwestern	2	–	5	–	1	2	–	8	–	1
Wisconsin	1	–	7	–	0	1	–	10	–	0
Minnesota	0	–	6	–	2	2	–	7	–	2
$ – Conference champion; Rankings from AP Poll

The 1988 Illinois Fighting Illini football team was an American football team that represented the University of Illinois at Urbana-Champaign as a member of the Big Ten Conference during the 1988 NCAA Division I-A football season. In their first year under head coach John Mackovic, the Fighting Illini compiled a 6–5–1 record (5–2–1 in conference games), tied for third place in the Big Ten, and outscored opponents by a total of 235 to 229. They concluded the season with a loss to Florida in the 1988 All-American Bowl.

The team's statistical leaders included quarterback Jeff George (2,257 passing yards, 57.9% completion percentage), running back Keith Jones (1,108 rushing yards, 60 points scored), and Steve Williams (38 receptions for 523 receiving yards). Three Illinois players won first-team honors on the 1988 All-Big Ten Conference football team: defensive lineman Moe Gardner (AP-1, UPI-1); defensive back Glenn Cobb (AP-1, UPI-1); and linebacker Darrick Brownlow (AP-1).

The team played its home games at Memorial Stadium in Champaign, Illinois.

== Schedule ==
Date	Opponent	Site	TV	Result	Attendance	Source
September 3	Washington State*	Memorial Stadium; Champaign, IL		L 7–44	54,458	
September 10	at Arizona State*	Sun Devil Stadium; Tempe, AZ		L 16–21	70,091	
September 17	Utah*	Memorial Stadium; Champaign, IL		W 35–24	54,002	
October 1	at Ohio State	Ohio Stadium; Columbus, OH (rivalry)		W 31–12	90,274	
October 8	Purdue	Memorial Stadium; Champaign, IL (rivalry)		W 20–0	63,743	
October 15	at Wisconsin	Camp Randall Stadium; Madison, WI		W 34–6	57,886	
October 22	Michigan State	Memorial Stadium; Champaign, IL		L 21–28	65,771	
October 29	at Minnesota	Hubert H. Humphrey Metrodome; Minneapolis, MN		T 27–27	40,554	
November 5	No. 20 Indiana	Memorial Stadium; Champaign, IL (rivalry)		W 21–20	66,201	
November 12	at No. 13 Michigan	Michigan Stadium; Ann Arbor, MI (rivalry)		L 9–38	105,714	
November 19	Northwestern	Memorial Stadium; Champaign, IL (rivalry)		W 14–9	42,329	
December 29	vs. Florida*	Legion Field; Birmingham, AL (All-American Bowl)	ESPN	L 10–14	48,218	
*Non-conference game; Rankings from AP Poll released prior to the game

== Roster ==
1988 Illinois Fighting Illini football team roster
Players
Coaches
Offense

Pos.	#	Name	Class
WR	2	Mike Bellamy	Jr
QB	11	Jeff George	So
RB	29	Howard Griffith	So
TE	82	Frank Hartley	So
RB	36	Keith Jones	Sr
C	53	Tim Scully	So

Defense

Pos.	#	Name	Class
DT	96	Mel Agee	So
LB	48	Darrick Brownlow	So
DT	95	Moe Gardner	So

Special teams

Pos.	#	Name	Class

Head coach

- John Mackovic

Coordinators/assistant coaches

Legend

- (C) Team captain
- (S) Suspended
- (I) Ineligible
- Injured
- Redshirt

Roster
