= Mike Mallory =

American football player and coach (born 1962)

Personal information
- Born: November 16, 1962 (age 63); Bowling Green, Ohio, U.S.

Career information
- High school: DeKalb (DeKalb, Illinois)
- College: Michigan
- NFL draft: 1986: undrafted

Career history

Playing
- Green Bay Packers (1986)*
- * Offseason or practice squad member only

Coaching
- Indiana (1986–1987) Graduate assistant; Kent State (1988–1990) Defensive line coach & linebackers coach; Eastern Illinois (1991–1992) Linebackers coach; Rhode Island (1993–1995) Defensive coordinator & linebackers coach; Northern Illinois (1996–1999) Defensive coordinator & defensive backs coach; Maryland (2000) Inside linebackers coach; Illinois (2001–2005); Defensive backs coach (2001-2003; Defensive coordinator (2004-2005); Kansas (2006) Linebackers coach; Louisville (2007) Defensive backs coach; New Orleans Saints (2008–2012) Assistant special teams coach; Jacksonville Jaguars (2013–2020); Special teams coordinator (2013-2016); Assistant special teams coach (2017-2020); Denver Broncos (2022) Assistant special teams coach; Michigan (2023) Special teams analyst

Awards and highlights
- CFP national champion (2023); Super Bowl champion (XLIV); Second-team All-American (1985); 2× First-team All-Big Ten (1984, 1985); Second-team All-Big Ten (1983)

Mike Mallory (born November 16, 1962) is an American former football player and coach. He was previously a special teams analyst at the University of Michigan in 2023, winning a national championship with the program. Before that, he coached for the Denver Broncos, Jacksonville Jaguars and New Orleans Saints of the National Football League (NFL). He played college football as a linebacker for the Michigan Wolverines from 1982 to 1985. He was the most valuable player for the 1984 Michigan team and a finalist for the Butkus Award in 1985. Mallory began coaching in 1986, with stints as the defensive coordinator for the Rhode Island Rams (1993–1995), Northern Illinois Huskies (1996–1999), Illinois Fighting Illini (2004–2005).

== Playing career ==
Mallory was born in Bowling Green, Ohio. He was an all-state football player at Illinois' DeKalb High School in 1980.

Mallory played for the Michigan Wolverines, 1982 to 1985, under Bo Schembechler. He was voted the Most Valuable Player of the 1984 team, was a co-captain and was an All-Big Ten Conference player in 1983, 1984 and 1985. He was also selected as a second-team All-American, and one of five finalists for the Butkus Award in its inaugural year in 1985, losing out to Brian Bosworth. The Butkus Award has been given annually to the top linebacker in college football.

As a senior in 1985, Mallory helped lead the Wolverines to a 10–1–1 record and a No. 2 ranking in the final AP poll after beating Nebraska, 27–23, in the Fiesta Bowl. The 1985 Wolverines defense that included Mallory, Mike Hammerstein, Brad Cochran, Mark Messner, Eric Kattus, Garland Rivers and Andy Moeller, gave up only 75 points in 11 regular season games, an average of less than seven points per game. When Mallory graduated, his 211 career tackles ranked third in school history behind Ron Simpkins and Mike Boren. Mallory graduated from the University of Michigan in 1985 with a bachelor's degree in sports administration.

=== Statistics ===
Year	Tackles	Assists	Totals	Interceptions	High Game Tackles
1982	9	1	10	0	4 (Northwestern)
1983	52	31	83	3	14 (Ohio State)
1984	88	39	127	3	19 (Purdue)
1985	62	39	101	0	17 (Iowa)
TOTAL	211	110	321	6	19 (Purdue)

== Personal life ==
Mike Mallory is the oldest son of Bill Mallory, who had served as the head football coach at Miami University (Ohio), University of Colorado, Northern Illinois University, and Indiana University. He has three siblings: an older sister, Barb, an older brother, Doug Mallory, who is a former NFL and NCAA coach, and a younger brother, Curt Mallory, who is the current Indiana State head coach.

Mallory and his wife, Kim, have a daughter, Kathryn, and a son, Will Mallory, who was drafted by the Indianapolis Colts in 2023.

In 2025, Mallory was hired as a football evaluator for SūmerSports, a sports data analytics company, and is a featured scout in their 2026 NFL draft evaluation show.
