= 1985 Michigan Wolverines football team =

American college football season

1985 Michigan Wolverines football

Fiesta Bowl champion

Fiesta Bowl, W 27–23 vs. Nebraska
- Conference: Big Ten Conference

Ranking
- Coaches: No. 2
- AP: No. 2
- Record: 10–1–1 (6–1–1 Big Ten)
- Head coach: Bo Schembechler (17th season)
- Defensive coordinator: Gary Moeller (8th season)
- MVP: Mike Hammerstein
- Captains: Brad Cochran; Eric Kattus; Mike Mallory
- Home stadium: Michigan Stadium

1985 Big Ten Conference football standings
| | Conf. | | | | | Overall |
| Team | W | | L | | T | W | | L | | T |
|---|---|---|---|---|---|---|---|---|---|---|
| No. 10 Iowa $ | 7 | – | 1 | – | 0 | 10 | – | 2 | – | 0 |
| No. 2 Michigan | 6 | – | 1 | – | 1 | 10 | – | 1 | – | 1 |
| Illinois | 5 | – | 2 | – | 1 | 6 | – | 5 | – | 1 |
| No. 14 Ohio State | 5 | – | 3 | – | 0 | 9 | – | 3 | – | 0 |
| Michigan State | 5 | – | 3 | – | 0 | 7 | – | 5 | – | 0 |
| Minnesota | 4 | – | 4 | – | 0 | 7 | – | 5 | – | 0 |
| Purdue | 3 | – | 5 | – | 0 | 5 | – | 6 | – | 0 |
| Wisconsin | 2 | – | 6 | – | 0 | 5 | – | 6 | – | 0 |
| Indiana | 1 | – | 7 | – | 0 | 4 | – | 7 | – | 0 |
| Northwestern | 1 | – | 7 | – | 0 | 3 | – | 8 | – | 0 |
$ – Conference champion; Rankings from AP Poll

The 1985 Michigan Wolverines football team represented the University of Michigan in the 1985 Big Ten Conference football season. In their 17th year under head coach was Bo Schembechler, the Wolverines compiled a 10–1–1 record, outscored all opponents by a combined total of 342 to 98, defeated five ranked opponents (including three in a row to start the season), suffered its sole loss against Iowa in a game matching the #1 and #2 teams in the AP Poll, defeated Nebraska in the 1986 Fiesta Bowl, and were ranked #2 in the final AP and Coaches Polls.

The team's offensive leaders were quarterback Jim Harbaugh, who set a school record with 1,976 passing yards, and Jamie Morris, who rushed for 1,030 yards. Led by consensus first-team All-Americans Mike Hammerstein at defensive tackle and Brad Cochran at cornerback, the defense tallied three shutouts, gave up only 75 points in 11 regular season games (6.8 points per game), and led the nation in scoring defense. Four Michigan defenders were selected as first-team players on the 1985 All-Big Ten Conference football team: Hammerstein and Mark Messner from the defensive line, linebacker Mike Mallory, and Cochran from the secondary.

== Schedule ==
| Date | Time | Opponent | Rank | Site | TV | Result | Attendance | Source |
|---|---|---|---|---|---|---|---|---|
| September 14 | 1:30 p.m. | No. 13 Notre Dame* | | Michigan Stadium; Ann Arbor, MI (rivalry) | CBS | W 20–12 | 105,523 | |
| September 21 | 3:30 p.m. | at No. 15 South Carolina* | No. 19 | Williams–Brice Stadium; Columbia, SC | ABC | W 34–3 | 74,200 | |
| September 28 | 1:00 p.m. | No. 17 Maryland* | No. 12 | Michigan Stadium; Ann Arbor, MI | PASS | W 20–0 | 105,282 | |
| October 5 | 1:00 p.m. | Wisconsin | No. 7 | Michigan Stadium; Ann Arbor, MI | | W 33–6 | 105,491 | |
| October 12 | 2:30 p.m. | at Michigan State | No. 3 | Spartan Stadium; East Lansing, MI (rivalry) | CBS | W 31–0 | 78,235 | |
| October 19 | 3:30 p.m. | at No. 1 Iowa | No. 2 | Kinnick Stadium; Iowa City, IA | CBS | L 10–12 | 66,350 | |
| October 26 | 1:00 p.m. | Indiana^{†} | No. 4 | Michigan Stadium; Ann Arbor, MI | PASS | W 42–15 | 105,629 | |
| November 2 | 2:00 p.m. | at Illinois | No. 4 | Memorial Stadium; Champaign, IL (rivalry) | | T 3–3 | 76,397 | |
| November 9 | 1:00 p.m. | Purdue | No. 9 | Michigan Stadium; Ann Arbor, MI | PASS | W 47–0 | 105,503 | |
| November 16 | 12:30 p.m. | at Minnesota | No. 8 | Hubert H. Humphrey Metrodome; Minneapolis, MN (Little Brown Jug) | | W 48–7 | 64,129 | |
| November 23 | 1:30 p.m. | No. 12 Ohio State | No. 6 | Michigan Stadium; Ann Arbor, MI (The Game) | CBS | W 27–17 | 106,102 | |
| January 1, 1986 | 1:30 p.m. | vs. No. 7 Nebraska* | No. 5 | Sun Devil Stadium; Tempe, AZ (Fiesta Bowl) | NBC | W 27–23 | 72,454 | |
*Non-conference game; ^{†}Homecoming; Rankings from AP Poll released prior to the game; All times are in Eastern time

== Season summary ==
=== No. 13 Notre Dame ===
Week 1: Notre Dame at Michigan

| Team | 1 | 2 | 3 | 4 | Total |
|---|---|---|---|---|---|
| No. 13 Fighting Irish | 3 | 6 | 3 | 0 | 12 |
| • Wolverines | 0 | 3 | 14 | 3 | 20 |

- Date: September 14
- Location: Ann Arbor, MI
- Game attendance: 105,523
- TV announcers (CBS): Brent Musburger (play-by-play) and Ara Parseghian (analyst)

Scoring summary
| 1 | | ND | John Carney 34-yard field goal | ND 3–0 |
| 2 | | ND | John Carney 37-yard field goal | ND 6–0 |
| 2 | | Mich | Mike Gillette 21-yard field goal | ND 6–3 |
| 2 | | ND | John Carney 47-yard field goal | ND 9–3 |
| 3 | | Mich | Jim Harbaugh 10-yard run (Gillette kick) | Michigan 10–9 |
| 3 | | ND | John Carney 25-yard field goal | ND 12–10 |
| 3 | | Mich | Gerald White 3-yard run (Gillette kick) | Mich 17–12 |
| 4 | 5:12 | Mich | Mike Gillette 22-yard field goal | Mich 20–12 |

On September 14, 1985, Michigan opened its season unranked in the polls and playing Notre Dame (ranked #13 in the AP Poll) at Michigan Stadium in front of 105,523 spectators and a national television audience. The Irish took a 9–3 lead at halftime, but the Wolverines won by a 20–12 score. Running back Jamie Morris rushed for 119 yards on 23 carries, and quarterback Jim Harbaugh completed 7 of 17 passes for 74 yards and rushed for 60 yards on nine carries. Harbaugh and Gerald White each scored a touchdown in the third quarter, and Mike Gillette kicked field goals in the second and fourth quarters. On defense, the Wolverines held Notre Dame to four John Carney field goals, as Allen Pinkett was limited to 89 yards and quarterback Steve Beuerlein was sacked six times. Andy Moeller led the defense with 15 total tackles, including 11 solo tackles. On the second half kickoff, Notre Dame's Alonzo Jefferson fumbled, and Michigan's Dieter Heren recovered to set up a 10-yard touchdown run by Harbaugh. After the game, Michigan coach Bo Schembechler said, "It means we're decent. We're not the dog people think we are." Harbaugh added, "I think the whole team proved we're back. We proved we're not a 6–6 team."

=== at No. 15 South Carolina ===
Week 2: Michigan at South Carolina

| Team | 1 | 2 | 3 | 4 | Total |
|---|---|---|---|---|---|
| • No. 19 Wolverines | 7 | 7 | 3 | 17 | 34 |
| No. 15 Gamecocks | 0 | 3 | 0 | 0 | 3 |

- Date: September 21
- Location: Columbia, SC

On September 21, 1985, Michigan defeated South Carolina (ranked #15 in the AP Poll), 34–3, at Williams–Brice Stadium in Columbia, South Carolina. The victory was the second in two weeks against ranked opponents. Quarterback Jim Harbaugh completed 12 of 22 passes for 164 yards and also rushed for 45 yards and a touchdown. The Wolverines rushed for 324 yards, led by Thomas Wilcher and Jamie Morris with 104 and 95 rushing yards, respectively. Paul Jokisch caught five passes for 115 yards. Michigan's four touchdowns were scored by Harbaugh, Morris, Wilcher, and Gerald White. Mike Gillette also kicked two field goals. On defense, the Wolverines held South Carolina to its lowest point total in three seasons under coach Joe Morrison.

=== No. 17 Maryland ===
Week 3: Maryland at Michigan

| Team | 1 | 2 | 3 | 4 | Total |
|---|---|---|---|---|---|
| No. 17 Terrapins | 0 | 0 | 0 | 0 | 0 |
| • No. 12 Wolverines | 3 | 7 | 7 | 3 | 20 |

- Date: September 28
- Location: Ann Arbor, MI

On September 28, 1985, Michigan won its third consecutive game against a ranked opponent, and did not yield a touchdown in any of those games. The third game was a 20–0 shut out against Maryland, ranked #17 in the AP Poll, in front of 105,282 spectators at Michigan Stadium. It was the first meeting between Maryland and Michigan. Jim Harbaugh completed 16 of 20 passes for 196 yards, threw two touchdown passes to tight end Eric Kattus, and also rushed for 32 yards. Jamie Morris added 73 rushing yards on 15 carries, and Mike Gillette kicked two field goals. On defense, Michigan held Maryland scoreless and intercepted four of Stan Gelbaugh's passes, including a third-quarter interception by Doug Mallory after Maryland had driven to Michigan's six-yard line. The shut out was the first given up by Maryland since 1979. After the game, Maryland coach Bobby Ross said, "I don't know if I've seen a quicker defense." With Michigan gaining more yards passing than rushing, columnist Mitch Albom wrote: "Twenty passes, 16 complete. More yards by air than by ground – and two, count 'em, two aerial touchdowns. Yep. Stop blinking. For the Michigan offense, Ol' Mighty Feet, has developed an arm . . ."

=== Wisconsin ===
Week 4: Wisconsin at Michigan

| Team | 1 | 2 | 3 | 4 | Total |
|---|---|---|---|---|---|
| Badgers | 0 | 6 | 0 | 0 | 6 |
| • No. 7 Wolverines | 7 | 10 | 6 | 10 | 33 |

- Date: October 5
- Location: Ann Arbor, MI

On October 5, 1985, Michigan (ranked #7 in the AP Poll) played undefeated Wisconsin in front of 105,491 spectators at Michigan Stadium. Michigan won, 33–6, as Jim Harbaugh threw three touchdown passes, and Jamie Morris rushed for 96 yards. On defense, Michigan held Wisconsin to 60 rushing yards (36 of which came on one run) and intercepted five of Mike Howard's passes. In addition to Harbaugh's three touchdown passes (two to running back Gerald White and one to tight end Eric Kattus), Michigan scored on a 28-yard interception return by cornerback Garland Rivers and two Mike Gillette field goals.

=== at Michigan State ===
Week 5: Michigan at Michigan State

| Team | 1 | 2 | 3 | 4 | Total |
|---|---|---|---|---|---|
| • No. 3 Wolverines | 14 | 3 | 0 | 14 | 31 |
| Spartans | 0 | 0 | 0 | 0 | 0 |

- Date: October 12
- Location: East Lansing, MI

On October 12, 1985, Michigan defeated Michigan State, 31–0, in front of a crowd of 78,235 at Spartan Stadium in East Lansing, Michigan. The victory was regarded at the time as revenge for the Spartans' 19–7 upset of the Wolverines in 1984. Michigan struck early after Michigan State quarterback Bobby McAllister fumbled the snap on the second play of the game, Andy Moeller recovered the ball on the Spartans' 16-yard line, and Jim Harbaugh threw a touchdown pass to tight end Eric Kattus. Less than two minutes after Michigan's first score, Dieter Heren blocked a Greg Montgomery punt, and Ed Hood recovered the ball in the end zone for Michigan's second touchdown. Harbaugh completed 13 of 23 passes, threw two touchdown passes to Kattus and gave up three interceptions. Jamie Morris rushed for 84 yards on 19 carries. Mike Gillette also kicked a field goal. On defense, Michigan held Lorenzo White (who set a Big Ten record with 2,066 yards in 1985) to a season-low 47 yards on 18 carries. The Wolverines' defense also sacked Bobby McAllister three times, intercepted him once, and held him to 83 passing yards.

=== at No. 1 Iowa ===
Week 6: Michigan at Iowa

| Team | 1 | 2 | 3 | 4 | Total |
|---|---|---|---|---|---|
| No. 2 Wolverines | 0 | 7 | 0 | 3 | 10 |
| • No. 1 Hawkeyes | 3 | 3 | 0 | 6 | 12 |

- Date: October 19
- Location: Iowa City, IA
- Game start: 2:50 p.m. CDT
- Elapsed time: 3:00
- Game attendance: 66,350
- Game weather: 60 °F (16 °C), Chance of showers, Wind SW 10–15 mph (16–24 km/h)
- Referee: Jerry Hendrickson
- TV announcers (CBS Sports): Brent Musburger and Ara Parseghian

Scoring summary
| 2 | 9:05 | IOWA | Houghtlin 35-yard field goal | IOWA 3-0 |
| 2 | 6:06 | MICH | White 6-yard pass from Jim Harbaugh (Gillette kick) | MICH 7-3 |
| 2 | 0:04 | IOWA | Houghtlin 27-yard field goal | MICH 7-6 |
| 4 | 14:20 | IOWA | Houghtlin 36-yard field goal | IOWA 9-7 |
| 4 | 10:55 | MICH | Gillette 40-yard field goal | MICH 10-9 |
| 4 | 0:00 | IOWA | Houghtlin 29-yard field goal | IOWA 12-10 |

On October 19, 1985, Michigan faced Iowa in a game matching the #1 and #2 teams in the AP Poll. A writer in the Detroit Free Press described the wide interest in the game: "They called it a mid-season bowl game, the 'Poll Bowl' between No. 1-ranked Iowa and No. 2 Michigan . . . watched by more than 60,000 fans at Kinnick Stadium, millions more on network television and heard by the men and women in all the ships at sea." Iowa won, 12–10, as the lead changed five times and Rob Houghtlin kicked a game-winning, 29-yard field goal as time ran out. The #1 Hawkeyes dominated the game statistically — holding major advantages in total yards (422-182), offensive plays (84-41), and time of possession (38:05-21:55) — but could not find the end zone. Iowa quarterback Chuck Long passed for 268 yards, but Michigan's defense held in the red zone, limiting the Hawkeyes to four field goals. Michigan quarterback Jim Harbaugh completed 8 of 13 passes for 55 yards, including a six-yard pass to Gerald White in the second quarter for Michigan's only touchdown. Mike Gillette kicked a field goal to give Michigan a 10–9 lead with 10:55 remaining. Houghtlin missed a 44-yard field goal with 7:33 remaining but converted on his final attempt as time ran out. One week later, Jim Harbaugh noted that, when Houghtlin's field goal went through the goalposts, "it felt like someone reached in and pulled everything out."

=== Indiana ===
Week 7: Indiana at Michigan

| Team | 1 | 2 | 3 | 4 | Total |
|---|---|---|---|---|---|
| Indiana | 9 | 6 | 0 | 0 | 15 |
| • Michigan | 7 | 8 | 10 | 17 | 42 |

- Date: October 26
- Location: Ann Arbor, MI
- Game attendance: 105,629

On October 26, 1985, Michigan defeated Indiana, 42–15, in front of a homecoming crowd of 105,629 spectators at Michigan Stadium. Indiana led 9–7 at the end of the first quarter, and the game was tied, 15–15, at halftime, but Michigan outscored the Hoosiers, 27–0, in the second half. Jim Harbaugh completed 17 of 23 passes for 283 yards and two touchdowns, and Jamie Morris rushed for 179 yards and two touchdowns on 24 carries. Harbaugh's 283 passing yards broke Michigan's single-game record of 259 yards set by Chris Zurbrugg in 1984. Tight end Eric Kattus was Harbaugh's favorite receiver with five catches for 123 yards, including a 34-yard touchdown reception. Paul Jokisch also caught four passes for 91 yards. After the game, Harbaugh was asked for his reaction to setting the school's passing record and responded, "Records are nice, but everything we do here is team oriented. Everyone's telling me about the record, but they should tell it to Paul Jokisch and Eric Kattus and John Kolesar. They caught the passes."

=== Illinois ===
Week 8: Michigan at Illinois

| Team | 1 | 2 | 3 | 4 | Total |
|---|---|---|---|---|---|
| Michigan | 0 | 0 | 3 | 0 | 3 |
| Illinois | 0 | 0 | 3 | 0 | 3 |

- Date: November 2
- Location: Champaign, IL
- Game attendance: 76,397

On November 2, 1985, Michigan played Illinois to a 3–3 tie before a crowd of 76,397 persons at Memorial Stadium in Champaign, Illinois. Each team kicked a field goal in the third quarter. Jamie Morris sustained a bruised shoulder and carried the ball only nine times for 31 yards. In the fourth quarter, Michigan drove the length of the field, but fullback Gerald White fumbled at the Illinois 12-yard line, with the Illini recovering at the nine-yard line. Illinois then drove the length of the field and, with time running out, Chris White (son of Illinois head coach Mike White) lined up for what would have been a game-winning, 37-yard field goal. Dieter Heren tipped the ball, which hit the cross-bar and bounced back, and the game ended in a tie. After the game, Illinois coach White said, "I don't remember feeling worse after a game. . . . I'm devastated."

=== Purdue ===
Week 9: Purdue at Michigan

| Team | 1 | 2 | 3 | 4 | Total |
|---|---|---|---|---|---|
| Purdue | 0 | 0 | 0 | 0 | 0 |
| • Michigan | 7 | 21 | 9 | 10 | 47 |

- Date: November 9
- Location: Ann Arbor, MI
- Game attendance: 105,503

On November 9, 1985, Michigan defeated Purdue, 47–0, before a crowd of 105,503 spectators at Michigan Stadium. The shutout came against a Purdue squad that had been averaging 482 yards of total offense and was led by quarterback Jim Everett who led the nation in total offense (3,589 yards) for the 1985 season. The Wolverines held Everett to 12 of 22 passing for 96 yards. Purdue as a whole was held to 104 yards of total offense and did not advance past its own 44-yard line. On offense, Michigan totaled 551 yards. Jim Harbaugh completed 12 of 13 passes for 233 yards and three touchdowns. The Wolverines also rushed for 275 yards, led by Phil Webb (97 yards) and Jamie Morris (73 yards). After the game, head coach Bo Schembechler praised the defense: "This defense scares me. It's not realistic. If you had bet everything you had that we'd play (Jack) Trudeau, (Chuck) Long and Everett and they'd not get into the end zone . . . it would be 1,000-to-1."

=== Minnesota ===
Week 10: Michigan at Minnesota

| Team | 1 | 2 | 3 | 4 | Total |
|---|---|---|---|---|---|
| • Michigan | 10 | 21 | 17 | 0 | 48 |
| Minnesota | 0 | 0 | 0 | 7 | 7 |

- Date: November 16
- Location: Minneapolis
- Game attendance: 64,129

On November 16, 1985, Michigan defeated Minnesota, 48-7, at the Hubert H. Humphrey Metrodome in Minneapolis. Prior to playing Michigan, Minnesota led the conference with 231.8 rushing yards per game behind running quarterback Rickey Foggie, but the Wolverines held the Golden Gophers scoreless through the first three quarters, led 48–0 at the start of the fourth quarter, and limited Foggie to 28 rushing yards. Minnesota's touchdown, the second allowed by Michigan during the season, came with 4:42 left in the game and with Michigan's second-string defense on the field. Chip Lohmiller's extra point was the first allowed by Michigan during the 1985 season.

Michigan jumped to an early lead capitalizing on three Minnesota mistakes in the first 18 minutes - a fumble recovery by Andy Moeller at the Minnesota 28-yard line, an interception by Ivan Hicks at Minnesota's 39-yard line, and a blocked punt by David Arnold. Jim Harbaugh completed 13 of 18 passes for 243 yards and three touchdowns, and fullback Gerald White rushed 19 times for 92 yards. Paul Jokisch caught five passes for 119 yards and two touchdowns. After the game, Harbaugh praised the offensive line, noting, "I've never had more time to throw in my life - junior high, high school." Gilvanni Johnson also returned a punt 84 yards for a touchdown. Mike Gillette also kicked two field goals to break Bob Bergeron's school record for field goals in a season. Harbaugh's 13 completions against Minnesota gave him 123 for the season, breaking the school record of 118 set by Steve Smith in 1982.

After the game, Minnesota head coach Lou Holtz called it "a near-flawless performance by Michigan."

=== No. 12 Ohio State ===
#12 Ohio State Buckeyes at #6 Michigan Wolverines

| Quarter | 1 | 2 | 3 | 4 | Total |
|---|---|---|---|---|---|
| Ohio State | 0 | 10 | 0 | 7 | 17 |
| Michigan | 3 | 7 | 10 | 7 | 27 |

at Michigan Stadium, Ann Arbor, Michigan

- Date: November 23
- Game weather: Overcast, 40 °F (4 °C)
- Game attendance: 106,102
- TV: CBS
- Box Score

Game information

First quarter

- MICH – Pat Moons 34-yard field goal, 1:59. Michigan 3–0. Drive: 7 plays, 21 yards.

Second quarter

- OSU – Rich Spangler 48-yard field goal, 11:40. Tie 3–3. Drive: 11 plays, 49 yards.
- OSU – Keith Byars 2-yard run (Rich Spangler kick), 8:41. Ohio St 10–3. Drive: 5 plays, 19 yards.
- MICH – Gerald White 4-yard pass from Jim Harbaugh (Pat Moons kick), 2:20. Tie 10–10. Drive: 12 plays, 80 yards.

Third quarter

- MICH – Pat Moons 38-yard field goal, 10:28. Michigan 13–10. Drive: 11 plays, 55 yards.
- MICH – Eric Kattus 5-yard pass from Jim Harbaugh (Pat Moons kick), 2:56. Michigan 20–10. Drive: 12 plays, 63 yards.

Fourth quarter

- OSU – Cris Carter 36-yard pass from Jim Karsatos (Rich Spangler kick), 10:10. Michigan 20–17. Drive: 9 plays, 80 yards.
- MICH – John Kolesar 77-yard pass from Jim Harbaugh (Pat Moons kick), 9:19. Michigan 27–17. Drive: 2 plays, 80 yards.

Top passers

- OSU – Jim Karsatos – 17/31, 179 yards, TD, INT
- MICH – Jim Harbaugh – 16/19, 230 yards, 3 TD

Top rushers

- OSU – Keith Byars – 12 rushes, 35 yards, TD
- MICH – Gerald White – 29 rushes, 110 yards

Top receivers

- OSU – Cris Carter – 5 receptions, 90 yards, TD
- MICH – John Kolesar – 4 receptions, 109 yards

On November 23, 1985, Michigan defeated Ohio State, 27–17, before a crowd of 106,102 at Michigan Stadium. The game was tied at 10–10 at halftime, but the Wolverines dominated the third quarter, possessing the ball for almost 12 of the 15 minutes and scoring 10 points to take a 20–10 lead. In the fourth quarter, Ohio State closed the gap to three points on a fourth-down, 36-yard touchdown pass to All-Big Ten receiver, Cris Carter. Less than a minute later, Jim Harbaugh completed a 77-yard touchdown pass to freshman John Kolesar, giving Michigan a 10-point lead with nine minutes remaining in the game. Coach Schembechler said after the game that the 77-yard touchdown was "a play that took the starch right out of their sails." Columnist wrote after the game that Harbaugh's pass to Kolesar was an image that would last: "The image that repeats will be that of Jim Harbaugh dropping back in the fourth quarter and uncorking a soaring spiral that rose high and long as flanker John Kolesar ran underneath it, his steps seemingly in sync with the revolutions of the ball, so when it fell, it fell right into his arms, almost gently . . ." Harbaugh completed 16 of 19 passes for 230 yards and three touchdowns, and fullback Gerald White rushed for 110 yards on 29 carries. After the game, Harbaugh said, "I know it sounds a little cocky, but I think we're the best team in the country."

=== vs. No. 7 Nebraska (Fiesta Bowl) ===
Fiesta Bowl: Michigan vs. Nebraska

| Team | 1 | 2 | 3 | 4 | Total |
|---|---|---|---|---|---|
| No. 7 Cornhuskers | 0 | 14 | 0 | 9 | 23 |
| • No. 5 Wolverines | 3 | 0 | 24 | 0 | 27 |

- Date: January 1
- Location: Tempe, AZ
- Game attendance: 72,454

On January 1, 1986, Michigan defeated Nebraska (ranked #7 in the AP Poll), 27-23, in the 1986 Fiesta Bowl. Nebraska led 14–3 at halftime, but Michigan scored 24 unanswered points in the third quarter, fueled by two Nebraska fumbles and a blocked punt recovered at Nebraska's six-yard line. Asked about his halftime speech that led to the third-quarter turnaround, Coach Schembechler said, "I'm not Knute Rockne. I don't have to yell all the time at halftime. I simply told 'em we had to stop their first drive, get the ball and score." Michigan running back Jamie Morris rushed for 156 yards on 22 carries and was named the game's offensive MVP. Quarterback Jim Harbaugh completed only 6 of 15 passes for 63 yards, but scored two touchdowns on runs of one and two yards. Nebraska outgained Michigan 370 yards to 234.

=== Post-season ===
After Michigan's victory in the Fiesta Bowl, Michigan jumped from #5 to #2 in the final AP and Coaches Polls.

== Roster ==
=== Full roster ===
1985 Michigan Wolverines football team roster
Players
Coaches
Offense

| Pos. | # | Name | Class |
|---|---|---|---|
| WR | 5 | Erik Campbell | So |
| OT | 72 | Jumbo Elliott | Jr |
| G | 78 | Mark Hammerstein | Sr |
| QB | 4 | Jim Harbaugh | Jr |
| G | | Mike Husar |
| WR | 26 | Gilvanni Johnson | Sr |
| WR | 84 | Paul Jokisch | Sr |
| TE | 81 | Eric Kattus | Sr |
| RB | 40 | John Kolesar | Fr |
| G | | Mike Krauss |
| OT | 79 | Clay Miller | Sr |
| RB | 23 | Jamie Morris |
| OT | 75 | Jerry Quaerna | Sr |
| C | 77 | Bob Tabachino | Sr |
| G | 67 | John Vitale | So |
| FB | 22 | Gerald White | Jr |
| RB | | Thomas Wilcher |

Defense

| Pos. | # | Name | Class |
|---|---|---|---|
| LB | 33 | Jeff Akers | Sr |
| CB | 30 | Brad Cochran | Sr |
| S | | Tony Gant |
| DT | 66 | Mike Hammerstein | Sr |
| MG | | Billy Harris |
| OLB | | Dieter Heren |
| SS | 17 | Ivan Hicks | Sr |
| LB | 42 | Mike Mallory | Sr |
| DT | | Mark Messner |
| LB | 49 | Andy Moeller | Sr |
| CB | 13 | Garland Rivers | Jr |
| OLB | | Jim Scarcelli |
| ILB | | Todd Schulte |
| OLB | | Steve Thibert |

Special teams

| Pos. | # | Name | Class |
|---|---|---|---|
| K | 19 | Mike Gillette | Fr |
| K | | Pat Moons | Sr |

Head coach

- Bo Schembechler

Coordinators/assistant coaches

Legend

- (C) Team captain
- (S) Suspended
- (I) Ineligible
- Injured
- Redshirt

Roster

=== Offense ===
- Eric Campbell - started 1 game at flanker
- Jumbo Elliott - started 11 games at left tackle
- Mark Hammerstein - started 3 games at left guard
- Jim Harbaugh - started all 12 games at quarterback
- Mike Husar - started 6 games at right guard
- Gilvanni Johnson - started 1 game at flanker
- Paul Jokisch - started all 12 games at split end
- Eric Kattus - started all 12 games at tight end
- John Kolesar - started 10 games at flanker
- Mike Krauss - started 4 games at right guard
- Clay Miller - started 10 games at right tackle, 2 games at right guard
- Jamie Morris - started 11 games at tailback
- Jerry Quaerna - started 1 game at left tackle, 1 game at right tackle
- Bob Tabachino - started all 12 games at center
- John Vitale - started 9 games at left guard
- Gerald White - started all 12 games at fullback
- Thomas Wilcher - started 1 game at tailback

=== Defense ===
- Jeff Akers - started 11 games at outside linebacker
- Brad Cochran - started all 12 games at weak-side cornerback
- Tony Gant - started all 12 games at free safety
- Mike Hammerstein - started all 12 games at defensive tackle
- Dieter Heren - started 1 game at outside linebacker
- Billy Harris - started all 12 games at middle guard
- Ivan Hicks - started all 12 games at strong safety
- Mike Mallory - started 10 games at inside linebacker
- Mark Messner - started all 12 games at defensive tackle
- Andy Moeller - started all 12 games at inside linebacker
- Garland Rivers - started all 12 games at strong-side cornerback
- Jim Scarcelli - started 11 games at outside linebacker
- Todd Schulte - started 2 games at inside linebacker
- Steve Thibert - started 1 game at outside linebacker

=== Professional football ===
Sixteen (16) members of the 1985 Michigan football team went on to play professional football. They are: Bobby Abrams (New York Giants, 1990–92; Cleveland Browns, 1992; Dallas Cowboys, 1992–1993; Minnesota Vikings, 1993–1994; New England Patriots, 1995), David Arnold (Pittsburgh Steelers, 1989); Jumbo Elliott (New York Giants, 1988–95, New York Jets, 1996–2000, 2002); Mike Hammerstein (Cincinnati Bengals, 1986-1990); Jim Harbaugh (Chicago Bears, 1987–93, Indianapolis Colts, 1994–97; Baltimore Ravens, 1998; San Diego Chargers, 1999–2000; Detroit Lions, 2001; Carolina Panthers, 2001); Ivan Hicks (Detroit Lions, 1987); Gilvanni Johnson (Detroit Lions, 1987); Eric Kattus (Cincinnati Bengals, 1986–91; New York Jets, 1992); Mark Messner (Los Angeles Rams, 1989); Clay Miller (Houston Oilers, 1987); Jamie Morris (Washington Redskins, 1988–89; New England Patriots, 1990; Hamilton Tiger-Cats, 1991); Bob Perryman (New England Patriots, 1987–90, Denver Broncos, 1991-92); Jerry Quaerna (Detroit Lions, 1987); Garland Rivers (Chicago Bears, 1987, Albany Firebirds, 1990–91, Arizona Rattlers, 1992–93); John Vitale (San Antonio Riders, 1991, Detroit Drive, 1993–94); and Gerald White (Dallas Cowboys, 1987).

== Awards ==
=== All-America honors ===
Several Michigan players received honors on the 1985 College Football All-America Team. They were:

- Mike Hammerstein - defensive tackle (consensus first-team All-American, with first-team honors from the Associated Press (AP), United Press International (UPI), and Kodak)
- Brad Cochran - cornerback (consensus first-team All-American, with first-team honors from the UPI, Football Writers Association of America (FWAA), and Kodak, and second-team honors from the AP)
- Eric Kattus - tight end (AP-3)
- Mark Messner - defensive line (AP-3)
- Mike Mallory - linebacker (AP-3, UPI-2)
- Clay Miller - offensive tackle (UPI-HM)
- Jim Harbaugh - quarterback (UPI-HM)

=== All-Big Ten honors ===
Several Michigan players also received honors on the 1985 All-Big Ten Conference football team. They were: Mike Mallory (AP-1, UPI-1), Brad Cochran (AP-1, UP-1), Mike Hammerstein (AP-1, UPI-1), Eric Kattus (AP-1), Mark Messner (AP-1), Clay Miller (AP-1), Andy Moeller (AP-2), and Garland Rivers (AP-2).

=== Team honors ===
On November 26, 1985, Michigan announced team honors. With 75 total tackles and 22 tackles for loss, senior defensive tackle Mike Hammerstein received the team's most valuable player award. Other team awards went to:

- Derek Howard hustler of the year award: Mike Mallory
- Meyer Morton Award: Clay Miller
- John Maulbetsch Award: Mark Messner
- Frederick Matthei Award: Gerald White
- Arthur Robinson Scholarship Award: Clay Miller
- Dick Katcher Award: Mike Hammerstein
- Hugh Rader Jr. Award: Eric Kattus, Clay Miller
- Robert P. Ufer Award: Brad Cochran

== Statistical leaders ==
=== Offense ===
==== Rushing ====
| Player | Att | Net Yards | Yds/Att | TD | Long |
|---|---|---|---|---|---|
| Jamie Morris | 197 | 1054 | 5.2 | 3 | 26 |
| Gerald White | 133 | 564 | 4.2 | 7 | 19 |
| Thomas Wilcher | 71 | 355 | 5.0 | 2 | 41 |
| Bob Perryman | 65 | 239 | 3.7 | 0 | 17 |
| Phil Webb | 19 | 142 | 7.5 | 3 | 65 |
| Jim Harbaugh | 79 | 139 | 1.8 | 4 | 24 |

==== Passing ====
| Player | Att | Comp | Int | Comp % | Yds | Yds/Comp | TD | Long |
|---|---|---|---|---|---|---|---|---|
| Jim Harbaugh | 227 | 145 | 6 | 63.9 | 1976 | 13.6 | 18 | 77 |
| Chris Zurbrugg | 14 | 5 | 0 | 35.7 | 100 | 20.0 | 0 | 30 |

==== Receiving ====
| Player | Recp | Yds | Yds/Recp | TD | Long |
|---|---|---|---|---|---|
| Paul Jokisch | 37 | 681 | 18.4 | 2 | 41 |
| Eric Kattus | 38 | 582 | 15.3 | 8 | 40 |
| John Kolesar | 12 | 336 | 28.0 | 3 | 77 |
| Jamie Morris | 33 | 216 | 6.5 | 1 | 35 |
| Gerald White | 18 | 123 | 6.8 | 4 | 15 |

=== Defense ===
| Player | Tackles | Assists | Total | Interceptions |
|---|---|---|---|---|
| Andy Moeller | 68 | 46 | 114 | 0 |
| Mike Mallory | 62 | 39 | 101 | 0 |
| Garland Rivers | 50 | 27 | 77 | 3 |
| Mark Messner | 42 | 30 | 72 | 0 |
| Mike Hammerstein | 44 | 22 | 66 | 1 |
| Ivan Hicks | 37 | 17 | 54 | 3 |
| Jeff Akers | 38 | 14 | 52 | 0 |
| Brad Cochran | 38 | 8 | 46 | 1 |
| Tony Gant | 31 | 14 | 45 | 1 |
| Doug Mallory | 23 | 18 | 51 | 3 |

=== Special teams ===
==== Kickoff returns ====
| Player | Returns | Yds | Yds/Rtrn | TD | Long |
|---|---|---|---|---|---|
| Jamie Morris | 12 | 253 | 21.1 | 0 | 60 |
| John Kolesar | 3 | 26 | 8.7 | 0 | 13 |

==== Punt returns ====
| Player | Returns | Yds | Yds/Rtrn | TD | Long |
|---|---|---|---|---|---|
| Gilvanni Johnson | 12 | 169 | 14.1 | 1 | 84 |
| Erik Campbell | 14 | 120 | 8.6 | 0 | 28 |
| Tony Gant | 5 | 35 | 7.0 | 0 | 15 |

==== Punts ====
| Player | Punts | Yds | Yds/Punt | Long |
|---|---|---|---|---|
| Monte Robbins | 48 | 1937 | 40.4 | 59 |

==== Field goals ====
| Player | Made | Attempts |
|---|---|---|
| Mike Gillette | 16 | 23 |
| Pat Moons | 4 | 5 |

== Coaching staff ==
- Head coach: Bo Schembechler
- Offensive assistants:

- Tirrel Burton - backfield
- Jerry Hanlon - quarterbacks
- Elliot Uzelac - offensive line

- Defensive assistants:

- Gary Moeller - assistant head coach and defensive coordinator
- Lloyd Carr - defensive backs
- Milan Vooletich - outside linebackers

- Other assistants

- Alex Agase - kicking coach
- Jerry Meter
- Bob Thornbladh

- Graduate assistants: Cam Cameron, Bill Sheridan, Mike Trgovac
- Trainer: Russ Miller
- Managers: Michael Drews, Donald Hammond, Aaron Studwell, Keith Webster
