= 1985 Iowa Hawkeyes football team =

American college football season

1985 Iowa Hawkeyes football

Big Ten champion

Rose Bowl, L 28–45 vs. UCLA
- Conference: Big Ten Conference

Ranking
- Coaches: No. 9
- AP: No. 10
- Record: 10–2 (7–1 Big Ten)
- Head coach: Hayden Fry (7th season)
- Offensive coordinator: Bill Snyder (7th season)
- Offensive scheme: Pro-style
- Defensive coordinator: Bill Brashier (7th season)
- Base defense: 5–2
- MVP: 13 players: Nate Creer; Mike Haight; Bill Happel; Ronnie Harmon; Scott Helverson; Tom Humphrey; Chuck Long; George Millett; Devon Mitchell; Jay Norvell; Kelly O'Brien; Hap Peterson; Larry Station
- Captains: Mike Haight; Ronnie Harmon; Chuck Long; Hap Peterson; Larry Station
- Home stadium: Kinnick Stadium

1985 Big Ten Conference football standings
	Conf.					Overall
Team	W		L		T	W		L		T
No. 10 Iowa $	7	–	1	–	0	10	–	2	–	0
No. 2 Michigan	6	–	1	–	1	10	–	1	–	1
Illinois	5	–	2	–	1	6	–	5	–	1
No. 14 Ohio State	5	–	3	–	0	9	–	3	–	0
Michigan State	5	–	3	–	0	7	–	5	–	0
Minnesota	4	–	4	–	0	7	–	5	–	0
Purdue	3	–	5	–	0	5	–	6	–	0
Wisconsin	2	–	6	–	0	5	–	6	–	0
Indiana	1	–	7	–	0	4	–	7	–	0
Northwestern	1	–	7	–	0	3	–	8	–	0
$ – Conference champion; Rankings from AP Poll

The 1985 Iowa Hawkeyes football team was an American football team that represented the University of Iowa as a member of the Big Ten Conference during the 1985 Big Ten football season. In their seventh year under head coach Hayden Fry, the Hawkeyes compiled a 10–2 record (7–1 in conference games), won the Big Ten championship, and outscored opponents by a total of 304 to 184. They won the first seven games, including a 12–10 victory over No. 2 Michigan, and were ranked No. 1 in the AP poll until losing to No. 8 Ohio State. They finished the regular season as Big Ten champion, but lost to No. 13 UCLA in the 1986 Rose Bowl and were ranked No. 10 in the final AP poll and No. 9 in the final UPI poll.

Quarterback Chuck Long won the Davey O'Brien Award, Maxwell Award, and Chicago Tribune Silver Football, and finished second to Bo Jackson in the Heisman Trophy voting. Long and linebacker Larry Station were consensus first-team All-Americans. Eight Hawkeyes, including Long, Station, and running back Ronnie Harmon received first-team honors on the 1985 All-Big Ten Conference football team.

The team played its home games at Kinnick Stadium in Iowa City, Iowa.

== Schedule ==
Date	Opponent	Rank	Site	TV	Result	Attendance	Source
September 14	Drake*	No. 5	Kinnick Stadium; Iowa City, IA		W 58–0	66,135	
September 21	Northern Illinois*	No. 4	Kinnick Stadium; Iowa City, IA		W 48–20	66,014	
September 28	at Iowa State*	No. 3	Cyclone Stadium; Ames, IA (rivalry)	ABC	W 57–3	53,202	
October 5	Michigan State^{†}	No. 1	Kinnick Stadium; Iowa City, IA	CBS	W 35–31	66,044	
October 12	at Wisconsin	No. 1	Camp Randall Stadium; Madison, WI (rivalry)		W 23–13	79,023	
October 19	No. 2 Michigan	No. 1	Kinnick Stadium; Iowa City, IA	CBS	W 12–10	66,350	
October 26	at Northwestern	No. 1	Dyche Stadium; Evanston, IL		W 49–10	47,269	
November 2	at No. 8 Ohio State	No. 1	Ohio Stadium; Columbus, OH	CBS	L 13–22	90,467	
November 9	Illinois	No. 6	Kinnick Stadium; Iowa City, IA		W 59–0	66,120	
November 16	at Purdue	No. 5	Ross–Ade Stadium; West Lafayette, IN	CBS	W 27–24	57,762	
November 23	Minnesota	No. 3	Kinnick Stadium; Iowa City, IA (rivalry)	TBS	W 31–9	66,020	
January 1	vs. No. 13 UCLA*	No. 4	Rose Bowl; Pasadena, CA (Rose Bowl)	NBC	L 28–45	103,292	
*Non-conference game; ^{†}Homecoming; Rankings from AP Poll released prior to the game

== Rankings ==
Ranking movements Legend: ██ Increase in ranking ██ Decrease in ranking ( ) = First-place votes
	Week																
Poll	Pre	1	2	3	4	5	6	7	8	9	10	11	12	13	14	15	Final
AP	4 (7)	4 (5)	5 (5)	4 (5)	3 (5)	1 (35)	1 (34)	1 (27)	1 (60)	1 (58)	6	5	3	2 (3)	3 (3)	4 (2)	10
Coaches	8 (1)		7	4	3	1 (19)	1 (16)	1 (16)	1 (42)	1 (42)	6	5	4	3	3	3	9

== Game summaries ==
=== Drake ===
Drake at #5 Iowa

Team	1	2	3	4	Total
Bulldogs	0	0	0	0	0
• No. 5 Hawkeyes	0	14	37	7	58

- Date: September 14
- Location: Kinnick Stadium, Iowa City, Iowa
- Game start: 1:05 p.m. EDT
- Elapsed time: 2:55
- Game attendance: 66,135
- Game weather: 65 °F (18 °C), Partly cloudy, Wind SW 10–12 miles per hour (16–19 km/h)
- Referee: Jim Kemerling
- Source: Box score and Game story

Scoring summary
2	10:37	IOWA	Clark 6-yard pass from Long (Houghtlin kick)	Iowa 7–0
2	0:02	IOWA	Helverson 4-yard pass from Long (Houghtlin kick)	Iowa 14–0
3	11:28	IOWA	R. Harmon 2-yard run (Houghtlin kick)	Iowa 21–0
3	9:16	IOWA	R. Harmon 6-yard run (kick failed)	Iowa 27–0
3	5:50	IOWA	Rob Houghtlin 46-yard field goal	Iowa 30–0
3	4:37	IOWA	K. Harmon 2-yard run (Houghtlin kick)	Iowa 37–0
3	3:40	IOWA	Hudson 10-yard run (Houghtlin kick)	Iowa 44–0
3	1:50	IOWA	Helverson 31-yard pass from Vlasic (Houghtlin kick)	Iowa 51–0
4	8:41	IOWA	Bayless 1-yard run (Houghtlin kick)	Iowa 58–0

	Drake	Iowa
First Downs	9	25
Rushing yards	–36	167
Passing	19–37–1	25–37–0
Passing yards	184	324
Total Offense	148	491
Fumbles Lost	2–2	0–0
Punts-Average	9–35.5	4–36.5
Penalties	6–59	6–37

Team	Category	Player	Statistics
Drake	Passing	Ed Cheatham	12–17, 121 yards, INT
Drake	Rushing	Lawrence	3 carries, 10 yards
Drake	Receiving	Peterson	6 receptions, 85 yards
Iowa	Passing	Chuck Long	21–31, 248 yards, 2 TD
Iowa	Rushing	Ronnie Harmon	14 carries, 58 yards, 2 TD
Iowa	Receiving	Scott Helverson	7 receptions, 88 yards, 2 TD

=== Northern Illinois ===
Northern Illinois at #4 Iowa

Team	1	2	3	4	Total
Huskies	0	7	6	7	20
• Hawkeyes	14	10	14	10	48

- Date: September 21
- Location: Kinnick Stadium, Iowa City, Iowa
- Game start: 1:05 p.m. EDT
- Elapsed time: 3:00
- Game attendance: 66,014
- Game weather: ~65 °F (18 °C), Cloudy
- Referee: Tom Quinn
- Source: Box score and Game story

Scoring summary
1	4:52	Iowa	Smith 8-yard pass from Long (Houghtlin kick)	Iowa 7–0
1	3:08	Iowa	Happel 36-yard pass from Long (Houghtlin kick)	Iowa 14–0
2	11:57	Iowa	Rob Houghtlin 50-yard field goal	Iowa 17–0
2	9:08	Iowa	Happel 39-yard pass from Long (Houghtlin kick)	Iowa 24–0
2	5:06	NIU	Wooldridge 21-yard pass from Taylor (Forester kick)	Iowa 24–7
3	6:31	Iowa	Early 15-yard pass from Long (Houghtlin kick)	Iowa 31–7
3	5:32	NIU	Taylor 1-yard run (run failed)	Iowa 31–13
3	3:32	Iowa	Happel 12-yard pass from Long (Houghtlin kick)	Iowa 38–13
4	11:43	IOWA	Rob Houghtlin 41-yard field goal	Iowa 41–13
4	5:46	Iowa	Mauro 16-yard pass from Vlasic (Houghtlin kick)	Iowa 48–13
4	1:34	NIU	Gerin 22-yard pass from Genatempo (Forester kick)	Iowa 48–20

Senior WR Bill Happel had a big day with 207 yards receiving and 3 touchdowns. The yardage total marked the first time a Hawkeye had more than 200 yards receiving in a single game and stood as the school record for two years.

	NIU	Iowa
First Downs	8	25
Rushing yards	16	187
Passing	5–14–2	20–32–3
Passing yards	69	347
Total Offense	85	534
Fumbles Lost	4–3	3–3
Punts-Average	10–43.8	3–48.0
Penalties	2–10	7–55
Time of Possession	30:35	29:25

Team	Category	Player	Statistics
Northern Illinois	Passing	Marshall Taylor	3–9, 41 yards, TD, 2 INT
Northern Illinois	Rushing	Antonio Davis	6 carries, 27 yards
Northern Illinois	Receiving	Andy Wooldridge	2 receptions, 37 yards, TD
Iowa	Passing	Chuck Long	18–28, 270 yards, 5 TD, 3 INT
Iowa	Rushing	Ronnie Harmon	17 carries, 92 yards
Iowa	Receiving	Bill Happel	9 receptions, 207 yards, 3 TD

=== at Iowa State ===
#3 Iowa at Iowa State

Team	1	2	3	4	Total
• No. 3 Hawkeyes	7	34	16	0	57
Cyclones	0	0	0	3	3

- Date: September 28
- Location: Jack Trice Stadium, Ames, Iowa
- Game start: 2:30 p.m. EDT
- Elapsed time: 3:25
- Game attendance: 53,202
- Game weather: 54 °F (12 °C), Wind NE 15 mph (24 km/h)
- Referee: Vance Carlson
- TV announcers (ABC): Al Michaels, Lee Grosscup, and Al Trautwig
- Source: Box score and Game story

Scoring summary
1	4:11	Iowa	Fred Bush 4-yard run (Houghtlin kick)	Iowa 7–0
2	14:05	Iowa	Rob Houghtlin 47-yard field goal	Iowa 10–0
2	8:55	Iowa	R. Harmon 2-yard run (Houghtlin kick)	Iowa 17–0
2	6:59	Iowa	R. Harmon 23-yard run (Houghtlin kick)	Iowa 24–0
2	2:48	Iowa	Rob Houghtlin 41-yard field goal	Iowa 27–0
2	1:47	Iowa	Mike Flagg 3-yard pass from Chuck Long (Houghtlin kick)	Iowa 34–0
2	0:47	Iowa	Smith 9-yard pass from Chuck Long (Houghtlin kick)	Iowa 41–0
3	13:19	Iowa	Scott Helverson 46-yard pass from Chuck Long (kick failed)	Iowa 47–0
3	9:37	Iowa	Rob Houghtlin 27-yard field goal	Iowa 50–0
3	2:33	Iowa	Scott Helverson 26-yard pass from Vlassic (Cook kick)	Iowa 57–0
4	5:21	ISU	Frank 52-yard field goal	Iowa 57–3

The Hawkeyes earned the third of 15 consecutive wins over their in-state rivals. To date, this remains the largest margin of victory in the series. The convincing win vaulted Iowa to the #1 ranking in the country, a spot they would occupy for five consecutive weeks.

	Iowa	ISU
First Downs	23	13
Rushing yards	138	73
Passing	24–40–0	16–33–1
Passing yards	357	157
Total Offense	495	230
Fumbles Lost	3–2	6–3
Punts-Average	3–38.7	8–35.1
Penalties	6–55	4–26
Time of Possession	28:33	31:27

Team	Category	Player	Statistics
Iowa	Passing	Chuck Long	19–32, 223 yards, 3 TD
Iowa	Rushing	Ronnie Harmon	19 carries, 103 yards, 2 TD
Iowa	Receiving	Scott Helverson	8 receptions, 154 yards, 2 TD
Iowa State	Passing	Alex Espinoza	16–33, 157 yards, INT
Iowa State	Rushing	Marques Rodgers	12 carries, 55 yards
Iowa State	Receiving	Danny Gantt	4 receptions, 43 yards

=== Michigan State ===
Michigan State at #1 Iowa

Team	1	2	3	4	Total
Spartans	0	10	14	7	31
• No. 1 Hawkeyes	7	6	15	7	35

- Date: October 5
- Location: Kinnick Stadium, Iowa City, Iowa
- Game start: 1:40 p.m. CDT
- Elapsed time: 3:50
- Game attendance: 66,044
- Game weather: 52 °F (11 °C), Cloudy, Wind NW 20–25 mph (32–40 km/h)
- Referee: Tom Quinn
- TV announcers (CBS Sports): Brent Musburger and Ara Parseghian
- Source: Box score and Game story

Scoring summary
1	10:23	Iowa	Robert Smith 60-yard pass from Chuck Long (Houghtlin kick)	Iowa 7–0
2	13:12	Iowa	Mike Flagg 17-yard pass from Chuck Long (kick failed)	Iowa 13–0
2	11:34	MSU	Chris Caudell 32-yard field goal	Iowa 13–3
2	9:15	MSU	Andre Rison 50-yard pass from Bobby McAllister (Caudell kick)	Iowa 13–10
3	12:30	MSU	Lorenzo White 23-yard run (Caudell kick)	MSU 17–13
3	7:01	MSU	Lorenzo White 1-yard run (Caudell kick)	MSU 24–13
3	6:16	Iowa	Robert Smith 4-yard pass from Chuck Long (Flagg pass from Long for two-point conversion)	MSU 24–21
3	3:21	Iowa	Mike Flagg 12-yard pass from Chuck Long (Houghtlin kick)	Iowa 28–24
4	4:06	MSU	Craig Johnson 25-yard run (Caudell kick)	MSU 31–28
4	0:27	Iowa	Chuck Long 2-yard run (Houghtlin kick)	Iowa 35–31

In their first game since ascending to the #1 ranking, the Hawkeyes survived a wild, back and forth thriller. The teams combined for well over 1,000 yards of total offense. Chuck Long (30–39, 380 yards, 4 TD) scored the winning touchdown on a 2-yard bootleg with 27 seconds remaining.

	MSU	Iowa
First Downs	28	25
Rushing yards	305	108
Passing	18–28–0	30–39–2
Passing yards	275	380
Total Offense	580	488
Fumbles Lost	1–0	0–0
Punts-Average	6–37.0	5–45.2
Penalties	9–50	4–40
Time of Possession	36:15	23:45

Team	Category	Player	Statistics
Michigan State	Passing	Bobby McAllister	18–27, 275 yards, TD
Michigan State	Rushing	Lorenzo White	39 carries, 226 yards, 2 TD
Michigan State	Receiving	Mark Ingram	7 receptions, 148 yards
Iowa	Passing	Chuck Long	30–39, 380 yards, 4 TD, 2 INT
Iowa	Rushing	Ronnie Harmon	20 carries, 84 yards
Iowa	Receiving	Scott Helverson	9 receptions, 102 yards

=== at Wisconsin ===
#1 Iowa at Wisconsin

Team	1	2	3	4	Total
• No. 1 Hawkeyes	3	7	3	10	23
Badgers	0	0	10	3	13

- Date: October 12
- Location: Camp Randall Stadium, Madison, Wisconsin
- Game start: 1:08 p.m. CDT
- Elapsed time: 2:51
- Game attendance: 79,023
- Game weather: 65 °F (18 °C), Cloudy, Wind SSW 10–20 mph (16–32 km/h)
- Referee: John Nealon
- Source: Box score and Game story

Scoring summary
1	3:55	IOWA	Rob Houghtlin 30-yard field goal	Iowa 3–0
2	11:42	IOWA	Bill Happel 8-yard pass from Chuck Long (Rob Houghtlin kick)	Iowa 10–0
3	5:52	WIS	Joe Armentrout 3-yard pass from Bud Keyes (Todd Gregoire kick)	Iowa 10–7
3	3:53	IOWA	Rob Houghtlin 40-yard field goal	Iowa 13–7
3	0:07	WIS	Todd Gregoire 27-yard field goal	Iowa 13–10
4	10:52	IOWA	Ronnie Harmon 12-yard run (Rob Houghtlin kick)	IOWA 20-10
4	6:01	WIS	Todd Gregoire 24-yard field goal	Iowa 20–13
4	3:14	IOWA	Rob Houghtlin 35-yard field goal	Iowa 23–13

	Iowa	Wis
First Downs	15	17
Rushing yards	174	172
Passing	18–30–1	13–31–3
Passing yards	167	134
Total Offense	341	306
Fumbles Lost	2–2	0–0
Punts-Average	5–43.4	8–36.8
Penalties	7–49	5–35
Time of Possession	26:58	33:02

Team	Category	Player	Statistics
Iowa	Passing	Chuck Long	18–28, 167 yards, TD, INT
Iowa	Rushing	Ronnie Harmon	20 carries, 175 yards, TD
Iowa	Receiving	Ronnie Harmon	8 receptions, 62 yards
Wisconsin	Passing	Bud Keyes	7–19, 88 yards, TD, 2 INT
Wisconsin	Rushing	Larry Emery	19 carries, 104 yards
Wisconsin	Receiving	Scott Sharron	5 receptions, 47 yards

=== No. 2 Michigan ===
#2 Michigan at #1 Iowa

Team	1	2	3	4	Total
No. 2 Wolverines	0	7	0	3	10
• No. 1 Hawkeyes	0	6	0	6	12

- Date: October 19
- Location: Kinnick Stadium, Iowa City, Iowa
- Game start: 2:50 p.m. CDT
- Elapsed time: 3:00
- Game attendance: 66,350
- Game weather: 60 °F (16 °C), Chance of showers, Wind SW 10–15 mph (16–24 km/h)
- Referee: Jerry Hendrickson
- TV announcers (CBS Sports): Brent Musburger and Ara Parseghian
- Source: Box score and Game story

Scoring summary
2	9:05	IOWA	Rob Houghtlin 35-yard field goal	Iowa 3–0
2	6:06	MICH	White 6-yard pass from Jim Harbaugh (Mike Gillette kick)	Mich 7–3
2	0:04	IOWA	Rob Houghtlin 27-yard field goal	Mich 7–6
4	14:20	IOWA	Rob Houghtlin 36-yard field goal	Iowa 9–7
4	10:55	MICH	Mike Gillette 40-yard field goal	Mich 10–9
4	0:00	IOWA	Rob Houghtlin 29-yard field goal	Iowa 12–10

The #1 Hawkeyes dominated the game statistically — holding major advantages in total yards (422–182), offensive plays (84–41), and time of possession (38:05-21:55) — but could not find the end zone. Rob Houghtlin kicked a 29-yard field goal as time expired to lift the top-ranked Hawkeyes to victory over the #2 Wolverines.

	Mich	Iowa
First Downs	9	26
Rushing yards	127	125
Passing	8–13–0	26–39–1
Passing yards	55	297
Total Offense	182	422
Fumbles Lost	0–0	1–0
Punts-Average	6–39.8	3–31.7
Penalties	4–35	3–26
Time of Possession	21:55	38:05

Team	Category	Player	Statistics
Michigan	Passing	Jim Harbaugh	8–13, 55 yards, TD
Michigan	Rushing	Jamie Morris	14 carries, 70 yards
Michigan	Receiving	Paul Jokisch	2 receptions, 23 yards
Iowa	Passing	Chuck Long	26–39, 297 yards, INT
Iowa	Rushing	Ronnie Harmon	32 carries, 120 yards
Iowa	Receiving	Bill Happel	9 receptions, 107 yards

=== at Northwestern ===
#1 Iowa at Northwestern

Team	1	2	3	4	Total
• No. 1 Hawkeyes	7	21	7	14	49
Wildcats	0	3	0	7	10

- Date: October 26
- Location: Dyche Stadium, Evanston, Illinois
- Game start: 1:37 p.m. CDT
- Elapsed time: 2:44
- Game attendance: 47,276
- Game weather: 67 °F (19 °C), Sunny, Wind SW 14 mph (23 km/h)
- Source: Box score and Game story

Scoring summary
1	8:48	IOWA	Bill Happel 28-yard pass from Chuck Long (Rob Houghtlin kick)	IOWA 7–0
2	9:16	NW	John Duvic 21-yard field goal	IOWA 7–3
2	7:14	IOWA	Ronnie Harmon 44-yard pass from Chuck Long (Rob Houghtlin kick)	IOWA 14–3
2	3:44	IOWA	Robert Smith 89-yard pass from Chuck Long (Rob Houghtlin kick)	IOWA 21–3
2	2:37	IOWA	Bill Happel 35-yard pass from Chuck Long (Rob Houghtlin kick)	IOWA 28–3
3	11:22	IOWA	Bill Happel 25-yard pass from Chuck Long (Rob Houghtlin kick)	IOWA 35–3
4	14:52	IOWA	Craig Clark 4-yard pass from Chuck Long (Rob Houghtlin kick)	IOWA 42–3
4	12:51	IOWA	Kevin Harmon 2-yard run (Rob Houghtlin kick)	IOWA 49–3
4	2:02	NW	Marc Bumgarner 4-yard pass from Mike Greenfield (John Duvic kick)	IOWA 49–10

On a windy day in Evanston, Chuck Long went 19-26 for 399 yards and a Big Ten record-tying 6 TDs. Bill Happel hauled in three touchdowns, finishing with 117 yards on 5 receptions.

	Iowa	NW
First Downs	20	18
Rushing yards	124	46
Passing	19–26–1	21–40–3
Passing yards	399	242
Total Offense	523	288
Fumbles Lost	1–0	1–0
Punts-Average	4–36.3	7–42.6
Penalties	4–34	3–15

Team	Category	Player	Statistics
Iowa	Passing	Chuck Long	19–26, 399 yards, 6 TD, INT
Iowa	Rushing	Ronnie Harmon	14 carries, 74 yards
Iowa	Receiving	Bill Happel	5 receptions, 117 yards, 3 TD
Northwestern	Passing	Mike Greenfield	21–40, 242 yards, TD, 3 INT
Northwestern	Rushing	Mike Greenfield	29 carries, 18 yards
Northwestern	Receiving	George Jones	4 receptions, 84 yards

=== at No. 8 Ohio State ===
#1 Iowa at #8 Ohio State

Team	1	2	3	4	Total
No. 1 Hawkeyes	0	7	0	6	13
• No. 8 Buckeyes	5	10	0	7	22

- Date: November 2
- Location: Ohio Stadium, Columbus, Ohio
- Game start: 2:44 p.m. CST
- Elapsed time: 3:19
- Game attendance: 90,467
- Game weather: 59 °F (15 °C), Rain, Wind S 10 mph (16 km/h)
- Referee: Gil Marchman
- TV announcers (CBS Sports): Brent Musburger and Ara Parseghian
- Source: Box score Archived 2015-11-25 at the Wayback Machine

Scoring summary
1	11:03	OSU	Rich Spangler 28-yard field goal	OSU 3–0
1	0:02	OSU	Safety, Sonny Gordan blocked punt out of end zone	OSU 5–0
2	9:06	OSU	John Woolridge 57-yard run (Spangler kick)	OSU 12–0
2	5:00	OSU	Rich Spangler 26-yard field goal	OSU 15–0
2	0:28	Iowa	Ronnie Harmon 3-yard run (Rob Houghtlin kick)	OSU 15–7
4	11:39	OSU	Vince Workman 4-yard run (Spangler kick)	OSU 22–7
4	8:19	Iowa	David Hudson 2-yard run (run failed)	OSU 22–13

	Iowa	Ohio St
First Downs	21	16
Rushing yards	186	233
Passing	17–34–4	10–17–2
Passing yards	169	151
Total Offense	345	370
Fumbles Lost	2–1	1–0
Punts-Average	4–32.5	4–45.3
Penalties	3–16	7–57

Team	Category	Player	Statistics
Iowa	Passing	Chuck Long	19–26, 169 yards, 4 INT
Iowa	Rushing	Ronnie Harmon	26 carries, 120 yards, TD
Iowa	Receiving	Ronnie Harmon	5 receptions, 19 yards
Ohio State	Passing	Jim Karsatos	10–17, 151 yards, 2 INT
Ohio State	Rushing	George Cooper	17 carries, 104 yards
Ohio State	Receiving	Cris Carter	3 receptions, 65 yards

=== Illinois ===
Illinois at #6 Iowa

Team	1	2	3	4	Total
Fighting Illini	0	0	0	0	0
• No. 6 Hawkeyes	35	14	0	10	59

- Date: November 9
- Location:
  Kinnick Stadium,
  Iowa City, Iowa
- Game start: 1:05 p.m. CST
- Elapsed time: 3:20
- Game attendance: 66,120
- Game weather: ~45 °F (7 °C), Cloudy, rain, Wind NE 10–15 mph (16–24 km/h)
- Referee: Otho Kortz
- Source: Box score

Scoring summary
1	11:54	IOWA	R. Smith 49-yard pass from Long (Houghtlin kick)	IOWA 7–0
1	10:16	IOWA	Hudson 1-yard run (Houghtlin kick)	IOWA 14–0
1	7:28	IOWA	R. Smith 43-yard pass from Long (Houghtlin kick)	IOWA 21–0
1	4:36	IOWA	R. Harmon 46-yard run (Houghtlin kick)	IOWA 28–0
1	0:59	IOWA	Hudson 10-yard run (Houghtlin kick)	IOWA 35–0
2	5:16	IOWA	Flagg 1-yard pass from Long (Houghtlin kick)	IOWA 42–0
2	2:31	IOWA	Helverson 9-yard pass from Long (Houghtlin kick)	IOWA 49–0
4	13:12	IOWA	Rob Houghtlin 37-yard field goal	IOWA 52–0
4	8:21	IOWA	Goodman 16-yard run (Houghtlin kick)	IOWA 59–0

	Illinois	Iowa
First Downs	14	27
Rushing yards	5	232
Passing	30–58–5	27–41–1
Passing yards	227	316
Total Offense	232	548
Fumbles Lost	5–4	1–0
Punts-Average	9–34.8	6–42.2
Penalties	10–82	5–62
Time of Possession	27:09	32:51

Team	Category	Player	Statistics
Illinois	Passing	Jack Trudeau	26–47, 208 yards, 4 INT
Illinois	Rushing	Thomas Rooks	7 carries, 26 yards
Illinois	Receiving	David Williams	10 receptions, 70 yards
Iowa	Passing	Chuck Long	22–30, 289 yards, 4 TD, INT
Iowa	Rushing	Ronnie Harmon	32 carries, 120 yards
Iowa	Receiving	Robert Smith	3 receptions, 98 yards, 2 TD

=== at Purdue ===
#5 Iowa at Purdue

Team	1	2	3	4	Total
• No. 5 Hawkeyes	7	17	0	3	27
Boilermakers	7	10	0	7	24

- Date: November 16
- Location: Ross–Ade Stadium, West Lafayette, Indiana
- Game start: 3:42 p.m. EST
- Elapsed time: 3:17
- Game attendance: 57,762
- Game weather: 46 °F (8 °C), Cloudy, Wind WSW 23 mph (37 km/h)
- Referee: Tom Quinn
- TV announcers (CBS Sports): Brent Musburger, Ara Parseghian, and Pat O'Brien
- Source: Box score and Game story

Scoring summary
1	9:21	Purdue	Griffin 49-yard pass from Jim Everett (Briggs kick)	Purdue 7–0
1	0:08	Iowa	Ronnie Harmon 2-yard run (Rob Houghtlin kick)	Tied 7–7
2	14:02	Iowa	Hudson 1-yard run (Rob Houghtlin kick)	IOWA 14–7
2	9:53	Purdue	Medlock 1-yard run (Briggs kick)	Tied 14–14
2	5:55	Iowa	Hudson 1-yard run (Rob Houghtlin kick)	IOWA 21–14
2	1:30	Purdue	Briggs 37-yard field goal	IOWA 21–17
2	0:02	Iowa	Rob Houghtlin 33-yard field goal	IOWA 24–17
4	6:35	Purdue	Medlock 2-yard run (Briggs kick)	Tied 24–24
4	1:08	Iowa	Rob Houghtlin 25-yard field goal	IOWA 27–24

	Iowa	Purdue
First Downs	28	16
Rushing yards	206	36
Passing	20–33–1	23–32–1
Passing yards	268	315
Total Offense	474	351
Fumbles Lost	1–0	2–1
Punts-Average	5–31.8	4–29.8
Penalties	4–19	2–10
Time of Possession	34:30	25:30

Team	Category	Player	Statistics
Iowa	Passing	Chuck Long	20–33, 268 yards, INT
Iowa	Rushing	Ronnie Harmon	25 carries, 122 yards, TD
Iowa	Receiving	Ronnie Harmon	9 receptions, 118 yards
Purdue	Passing	Jim Everett	23–32, 315 yards, TD, INT
Purdue	Rushing	Ray Wallace	10 carries, 21 yards
Purdue	Receiving	Steve Griffin	4 receptions, 110 yards, TD

=== Minnesota ===
Minnesota at #3 Iowa

Team	1	2	3	4	Total
Golden Gophers	3	0	0	6	9
• No. 3 Hawkeyes	7	10	7	7	31

- Date: November 23
- Location:
  Kinnick Stadium,
  Iowa City, Iowa
- Game start:
  11:40 a.m. CST
- Elapsed time: 3:00
- Game attendance: 66,020
- Game weather: ~25 °F (−4 °C), Cloudy, Wind NNW 10–15 mph (16–24 km/h)
- Referee: John Nealon
- TV announcers (TBS Sports): Pete van Wieren (play-by-play) and Ron Kramer (analyst)
- Source: Box score and Game story

Scoring summary
1	9:48	Iowa	Ronnie Harmon 5-yard run (Rob Houghtlin kick)	IOWA 7–0
1	1:54	Minn	Chip Lohmiller 35-yard field goal	IOWA 7–3
2	5:15	Iowa	Rob Houghtlin 26-yard field goal	IOWA 10–3
2	1:40	Iowa	Mike Flagg 4-yard pass from Chuck Long (Rob Houghtlin kick)	IOWA 17–3
3	9:39	Iowa	Kevin Harmon 10-yard run (Rob Houghtlin kick)	IOWA 24–3
4	14:11	Iowa	Rick Bayless 5-yard run (Rob Houghtlin kick)	IOWA 31–3
4	2:01	Minn	Gailord 16-yard pass from Holt (conversion failed)	IOWA 31–9

In the battle for the Floyd of Rosedale, Iowa beat the Golden Gophers in Lou Holtz's last game as Minnesota's head coach. Chuck Long, in his final game at Kinnick Stadium, became the first player in Big Ten history to eclipse 10,000 career passing yards.

	Minn	Iowa
First Downs	18	24
Rushing yards	154	177
Passing	9–18–0	21–31–1
Passing yards	118	268
Total Offense	272	445
Fumbles Lost	4–2	2–1
Punts-Average	6–32.8	2–39.5
Penalties	1–5	6–30
Time of Possession	30:10	29:50

Team	Category	Player	Statistics
Minnesota	Passing	Rickey Foggie	6–13, 69 yards
Minnesota	Rushing	David Puk	13 carries, 61 yards
Minnesota	Receiving	Eugene Gailord	3 receptions, 57 yards, TD
Iowa	Passing	Chuck Long	21–31, 268 yards, TD, INT
Iowa	Rushing	Ronnie Harmon	13 carries, 75 yards, TD
Iowa	Receiving	Scott Helverson	7 receptions, 86 yards

=== vs. No. 13 UCLA (Rose Bowl) ===
#13 UCLA vs. #4 Iowa

Team	1	2	3	4	Total
• No. 13 Bruins	10	14	7	14	45
No. 4 Hawkeyes	7	3	7	11	28

- Date: January 1, 1986
- Location: Rose Bowl, Pasadena, California
- Game start:
  2:12 p.m. PST
- Elapsed time: 3:18
- Game attendance: 103,292
- Game weather: 71 °F (22 °C), Overcast, Wind S 5 mph (8.0 km/h)
- Referee: Tom Quinn
- TV announcers (NBC): Dick Enberg, Merlin Olsen

Scoring summary
1	7:02	IOWA	David Hudson 1-yard run (Houghtlin kick)	IOWA 7–0
1	3:23	UCLA	Eric Ball 30-yard run (Lee kick)	Tied 7–7
1	1:11	UCLA	John Lee 42-yard field goal	UCLA 10–7
2	7:43	IOWA	Rob Houghtlin 24-yard field goal	Tied 10–10
2	6:19	UCLA	Eric Ball 40-yard run (Lee kick)	UCLA 17–10
2	1:36	UCLA	Eric Ball 6-yard run (Lee kick)	UCLA 24–10
3	12:19	IOWA	Chuck Long 4-yard run (Houghtlin kick)	UCLA 24–17
3	6:25	UCLA	Mike Sherrard 6-yard pass from Matt Stevens (J. Lee kick)	UCLA 31–17
4	13:25	UCLA	Eric Ball 32-yard run (Lee kick)	UCLA 38–17
4	10:51	IOWA	Rob Houghtlin 52-yard field goal	UCLA 38–20
4	6:38	UCLA	Matt Stevens 1-yard run (Lee kick)	UCLA 45–20
4	3:11	IOWA	Bill Happel 11-yard pass from Chuck Long (Harmon run)	UCLA 45–28

	UCLA	Iowa
First Downs	29	25
Rushing yards	55–299	34–82
Passing	16–26–1	29–38–1
Passing yards	189	319
Total Offense	488	401
Fumbles Lost	3–2	4–4
Punts-Average	2–38.5	2–32.5
Penalties	6–36	5–40

Team	Category	Player	Statistics
UCLA	Passing	Matt Stevens	16–26, 189 yards, TD, INT
UCLA	Rushing	Eric Ball	12 carries, 67 yards
UCLA	Receiving	Mike Sherrard	4 receptions, 48 yards
Iowa	Passing	Chuck Long	29–37, 319 yards, TD, INT
Iowa	Rushing	Ronnie Harmon	14 carries, 55 yards
Iowa	Receiving	Ronnie Harmon	11 receptions, 102 yards

== Roster ==
1985 Iowa Hawkeyes football team roster
Players
Coaches
Offense

Pos.	#	Name	Class
OL	55	Dave Alexander	Jr
OL	75	Kevin Angel	Sr
FB	23	Richard Bass	Fr
RB	13	Rick Bayless	So
OL	69	Mike Bennett	Sr
FB	35	Fred Bush	Sr
OL	78	Malcolm Christie	So
TE	49	Craig Clark	So
TE	84	Marv Cook	Fr
WR	82	Pat Coppinger	Jr
FB	25	Marshall Cotton	So
OT	61	Dave Croston	Jr
OL	63	Jeff Croston	Fr
OL	58	Greg Divis	So
WR	1	Quinn Early	So
TE	86	Mike Flagg	So
OL	74	Chris Gambol	Jr
RB	22	Grant Goodman	Fr
WR	80	Steve Green	So
OT	79	Mike Haight (C)	Sr
WR	40	Bill Happel	Sr
RB	28	Kevin Harmon	So
RB	31	Ronnie Harmon (C)	Sr
QB	8	Chuck Hartlieb	Fr
WR	87	Scott Helverson	Sr
QB	15	Jay Hess	Jr
FB	20	David Hudson	Fr
G	65	Tom Humphrey	Sr
G	70	Bob Kratch	Fr
QB	16	Chuck Long (C)	Sr
WR	81	Derrius Loveless	So
RB		John Marchese	Sr
WR	26	Peter Marciano	Fr
WR	47	Jim Mauro	So
TE	89	Dave Murphy	Jr
OL	66	Kelly O'Brien	Sr
TE	85	John Palmer	Fr
QB	14	Tom Poholsky	Fr
OL	67	Jim Poynton	Fr
RB	33	Kevin Ringer	Fr
FB	30	John Rudolph	Jr
OL	60	Bob Schmitt	So
FB	17	Tim Sennott	Sr
C	56	Mark Sindlinger	Jr
WR	2	Robert Smith	Jr
OL	53	Mark Spranger	Jr
QB	12	Mark Vlasic	Jr
OL	71	Chuck Waggoner	Fr
TE	88	Tom Ward	So
OL	73	Herb Wester	So

Defense

Pos.	#	Name	Class
DL	68	Tim Anderson	So
LB	93	Tim Batterson	So
DE	92	Jeff Beard	So
DE	48	Tyrone Berrie	Fr
LB	43	Jeff Blake	So
DB	19	Mike Bolan	Jr
DE	5	Mike Burke	So
DE	90	Doug Burrell	Sr
DB	3	Kerry Burt	So
CB	29	Nate Creer	Sr
DB	18	Kyle Crowe	Sr
LB	37	George Davis	Jr
DL	76	Jeff Drost	Jr
DE	83	Mike Ertz	Fr
DE	94	Bruce Gear	Jr
DE	96	Robert Grafton	Jr
DL	64	Dave Haight	Fr
DL	54	Eric Higgins	Fr
DB	42	Tork Hook	Fr
DB	19	Carl Jackson	So
DL	77	Myron Keppy	Jr
DB	4	Lloyd Kimber	Jr
LB	34	Vernon Little	Fr
DE	98	George Millett	Sr
DB	21	Devon Mitchell	Sr
DE	97	Joe Mott	Fr
DB	45	Jay Norvell	Sr
DL	50	Hap Peterson (C)	Sr
DE	71	Chris Pigott	Fr
DE	99	Richard Pryor	Jr
LB	32	J.J. Puk	Jr
LB	95	Jim Reilly	Fr
LB	38	Shawon Respress	Fr
DE	91	Sean Ridley	Fr
DB	11	Rick Schmidt	Jr
DL	72	Joe Schuster	Jr
DB	44	Keaton Smiley	So
DB	9	Ken Sims	Jr
LB	36	Larry Station (C)	Sr
DB	41	Mark Stoops	Fr
LB	39	Tyrone Taylor	So
DL	95	Eric Underberg	Jr
DL	57	Jon Vrieze	Jr
DL	51	Bill Weires	Sr
LB	46	Dan Wirth	So
DB	10	Anthony Wright	Fr

Special teams

Pos.	#	Name	Class
K	84	Marv Cook	Fr
K	6	George Murphy	Fr
K	7	Rob Houghtlin	So
P	27	Gary Kostrubala	Jr

Head coach

- Hayden Fry

Coordinators/assistant coaches

- Bill Snyder – Offensive coordinator/quarterbacks
- Bill Brashier – Defensive coordinator
- Kirk Ferentz – Offensive line
- Carl Jackson – Running backs
- Del Miller – Offensive assistant
- Dan McCarney – Defensive line
- Barry Alvarez – Linebackers
- Don Patterson – Defensive backs
- Bernie Wyatt – Defensive ends/recruiting coordinator
- Bill Dervich – Strength and conditioning
- Bob Stoops – Volunteer assistant

Legend

- (C) Team captain
- (S) Suspended
- (I) Ineligible
- Injured
- Redshirt

== Statistics ==
Team statistics. On offense, the Hawkeyes gained an average of 299.3 passing yards and 164.9 rushing yards per games. They led the Big Ten with an average of 36.7 points per game. On defense, they gave up 175.2 passing yards and 101.5 rushing yards per game. They ranked second in the conference in scoring defense, giving up 15.6 points per game.

Passing. Quarterback Chuck Long set Iowa single-season records with 351 pass attempts, 231 pass completions, and 2,978 passing yards. He had a 65.8% completion rate, 26 passing touchdowns,and a 153.0 passer rating. Long also became the first Big Ten player to tally over 10,000 passing yards in his career.

Rushing. Running back Ronnie Harmon led the team with 1,111 rushing yards on 209 carries for an average of 5.3 yards per carry. Harmon also tallied 49 receptions for 597 yards. He also led the team with 10 touchdowns (nine rushing and one receiving)

Receiving. Wide receiver Bill Happel led the team with 812 receiving yards on 50 receptions with seven receiving touchdowns. Happel also returned 19 punts for 925 yards, an average of 5.9 yards per return. Scott Helverson led with 53 receptions, good for 686 receiving yards and five touchdowns.

Scoring. Kicker Rob Houghtlin set a new Iowa scoring record with 97 points, converting 46 of 49 extra points and 17 of 25 field goal attempts.

== Awards and honors ==
Senior quarterback Chuck Long won the Maxwell Award (best player in college football) by a two-to-one margin over runner-up Bo Jackson, Davey O'Brien Award (best quarterback), and Chicago Tribune Silver Football (Big Ten most valuable player). He also finished second in close voting behind Jackson in the 1985 Heisman Trophy voting. Long also received first-team honors from, among others, the Associated Press (AP), United Press International (UPI), American Football Coaches Association (AFCA), Football Writers Association of America (FWAA), and Newspaper Enterprise Association (NEA) on the 1985 All-America college football team.

Linebacker Larry Station was a consensus first-team All-American, receiving first-team honors from the AFCA, AP, FWAA, UPI, and NEA.

Both Long and Station were later inducted into the College Football Hall of Fame.

Eight Hawkeyes received first-team honors on the 1985 All-Big Ten Conference football team: Long at quarterback (AP-1, UPI-1); Station at linebacker (AP-1, UPI-1); Ronnie Harmon at running back (AP-1, UPI-1); offensive tackle Mike Haight (AP-1, UPI-1); defensive linemen Jeff Drost (AP-1, UPI-1) and Hap Peterson (AP-1, UPI-1); defensive back Jay Norvell (AP-1); and kicker Rob Houghtlin (AP-1).

== 1986 NFL draft ==
Player	Position	Round	Pick	NFL club
Chuck Long	Quarterback	1	12	Detroit Lions
Ronnie Harmon	Running back	1	16	Buffalo Bills
Mike Haight	Tackle	1	22	New York Jets
Devon Mitchell	Defensive back	4	92	Detroit Lions
Larry Station	Linebacker	11	287	Pittsburgh Steelers

== Future head coaches ==
Name	1985 Position	School	Tenure
Bill Snyder	Offensive coordinator/QB Coach	Kansas State	1989–2005, 2009–2018
Barry Alvarez	Linebackers Coach	Wisconsin	1990–2005
Dan McCarney	Defensive line coach	Iowa State; North Texas	1995–2006; 2011–2015
Bob Stoops	Volunteer Coach	Oklahoma	1999–2016
Kirk Ferentz	Offensive line coach	Iowa	1999–present
Don Patterson	Tight ends coach	Western Illinois	1999–2009
Chuck Long	Quarterback	San Diego State	2006–2008
Mark Stoops	Defensive back	Kentucky	2013–present
Jay Norvell	Defensive backs	Nevada; Colorado State	2017–2021; 2022–present
