= Gerald White =

American football player (born 1964)

- Gerald White Gerald White in 2014

No. 37
- Position: Fullback

Personal information
- Born: December 9, 1964 (age 61); Titusville, Florida, U.S.
- Listed height: 5 ft 11 in (1.80 m)
- Listed weight: 223 lb (101 kg)

Career information
- High school: Titusville
- College: Michigan
- NFL draft: 1987: undrafted

Career history
- Dallas Cowboys (1987); Miami Dolphins (1989)*
- * Offseason or practice squad member only

Career NFL statistics
- Receptions: 5
- Receiving yards: 46
- Stats at Pro Football Reference

Gerald Eugene White (born December 9, 1964) is an American former professional football player who was a running back in the National Football League (NFL) for the Dallas Cowboys. He played college football for the Michigan Wolverines.

== Early life ==
White began his football career at Memorial Junior High School, and spent two years at Orlando's William R. Boone High School. He then moved to Titusville High School for his junior and senior years. As a senior in 1982, White was selected as a Parade High School All-American. As a two-way player, he led Titusville to the Florida High School Athletic Association Class AAA football championship. After White dominated the Region 5 playoff game, the Lakeland Ledger wrote:

The 6-foot-2, 205-pound White rumbled for 178 yards and two touchdowns as the Terriers blanked Lake Wales 33-0. White did it all. He even punted twice for a 46.5-yard average ... He finished the first half with 138 yards.

Two weeks later, White led Titusville to a 29–0 win over Homestead in the Class AAA state semi-final game, rushing for 118 yards and two touchdowns and kicking a 27-yard field goal. In the state championship game, Titusville defeated Kissimmee Osceola 33–0 as White rushed 12 times for 139 yards and a touchdown. White later recalled playing football for coach Al Werneke at Titusville: "The closeness and camaraderie are what I remember most about our high school teams. We loved coach Werneke and enjoyed each other, and it was culminated by winning the state championship."

White rushed for over 1,000 yards in each of his final three seasons and was a two-time All-America. As a high school football player, he was known as "Stardust", a nickname that reportedly "evolved from his fascination for the Stardust Hotel in Las Vegas, where he lived before moving to Florida".

== College career ==
In 1983, White accepted a football scholarship from the University of Michigan. He played for the Michigan Wolverines football team under head coach Bo Schembechler from 1983 to 1986.

As a freshman in 1983, White appeared in three games for the Wolverines, gaining 64 yards in 20 carries. As a sophomore in 1984, White appeared in seven games and started two games at the tailback position. He gained 345 yards on 91 carries, including 89 yards in Michigan's 22–14 victory over the Miami Hurricanes in the season opener. After the Miami game, Schembechler praised White's effort: "We did not block well. I thought (tailback Gerald) White, under the circumstances with no blocking, ran good. He made some tough yards."

As a junior in 1985, coach Bo Schembechler converted White from a tailback to a fullback. Though White had previously resisted efforts to have him play fullback, White later recalled, "But it was the best thing that ever happened to me, because I learned more about the game." White started all 12 games for the Wolverines at the fullback position. The 1985 Michigan football team, with White, Jamie Morris and Jim Harbaugh in the backfield, compiled a record of 10–1–1, outscored opponents 342 to 98 and finished the season ranked No. 2 in both the AP and UPI polls. During the 1985 season, White gained 564 rushing yards on 133 carries and 123 receiving yards on 18 catches. He also led the team with 11 total touchdowns (seven rushing and four receiving) on the season. He had his career-best game in Michigan's 27–17 victory over Ohio State, as he rushed for 110 yards on 29 carries and added 23 receiving yards on three catches. He also scored the go-ahead touchdown in Michigan's 27–23 victory over Nebraska in the 1986 Fiesta Bowl.

As a senior in 1986, White started 11 of 13 games for the Wolverines at fullback. With the same starting backfield of White, Morris and Harbaugh, the 1986 team finished 11–1 in the regular season and was ranked No. 8 in the AP poll and No. 7 in the UPI poll. The team advanced to the 1987 Rose Bowl, losing to Arizona State by a score of 22–15. White totaled 323 rushing yards (fourth on the team) on 88 carries and 408 receiving yards (third on the team) on 38 catches (led the team). He scored eight touchdowns (tied for the team lead), five rushing and three receiving, during the 1986 season. In the 1987 Rose Bowl, White caught a pass from Mike Gillette in the end zone for a two-point conversion on a fake kick. At the end of the 1986 season, White also played in the 1987 Hula Bowl.

In four years at Michigan, White totaled 1,864 yard of offense for the Wolverines. He rushed for 1,297 yards, caught 64 passes for 567 yards and scored 19 touchdowns. Interviewed in 1997, White said, "The highlight of playing at Michigan, more than rushing for 110 yards against Ohio State and going to the Rose Bowl, was playing for Bo Schembechler. You either loved or hated Bo, but I loved him. I loved him because he taught me so much about life."

== Professional career ==
=== Dallas Cowboys ===
White was signed as an undrafted free agent by the Dallas Cowboys after the 1987 NFL draft. He was released on September 1. After the NFLPA strike was declared on the third week of the 1987 season, those contests were canceled (reducing the 16-game season to 15) and the NFL decided that the games would be played with replacement players. He was re-signed to be a part of the Dallas replacement team that was given the mock name "Rhinestone Cowboys" by the media. On being named to the Cowboys' lineup, White called it a "dream". He started all 3 games at fullback, making five receptions for 46 yards. He was waived at the end of the strike on October 26.

In 1988, White was signed by the Cowboys as a free agent. He was cut at the end of training camp on August 29.

=== Miami Dolphins ===
In May 1989, White signed as a free agent with the Miami Dolphins. He was cut on September 4. During his career in football, White played for Bo Schembechler at Michigan, Tom Landry at Dallas and Don Shula at Miami.

== Personal life ==
After White retired from football, he moved to Atlanta, where he worked for two years for the Hooters restaurant organization. He later formed G-Sport Management and Marketing, a sports marketing company in Orlando.

In 1997, White was the manager of promotions for Champion sportswear in Winston-Salem, North Carolina. At the time, White recalled, "I played for some of the best coaches ever. I don't want to coach because of the attitudes of some of today's players, but I apply what I learned to the business world. Sacrifice, trust and perfecting what you do are important, no matter what you do."

In 2005, White formed Gerald White International, LLC, a marketing and events company. He is also the managing partner of LudaJuice, Inc. In April 2010, Gerald White International moved its headquarters from Miami Beach, Florida, to Ann Arbor, Michigan. The firm's clients include the National Athletic Association and The Ludacris Foundation.
