= Scott Thomas (American football) =

American football player (born 1964)

Profile
- Position: DB

Personal information
- Born: February 12, 1964 (age 62); San Antonio, Texas, U.S.

Career information
- High school: San Antonio (TX) John Jay
- College: Air Force

Awards and highlights
- Consensus All-American (1985)
- College Football Hall of Fame

Scott Thomas is an American former football player. He was elected to the College Football Hall of Fame in 2012.

Collegiately, Thomas played for Air Force and was the captain of their one loss 1985 team. He was named to the 1985 College Football All-America Team and was MVP of the 1985 Bluebonnet Bowl. After he graduated, he flew combat missions in Desert Storm flying F-16s. He was shot down and picked up by Search and Rescue forces as he was being stalked by Iraqi forces intent on capturing him. He was awarded the Distinguished Flying Cross.
