= 1985 All-Big Ten Conference football team =

American college football all-star team

The 1985 All-Big Ten Conference football team consists of American football players chosen as All-Big Ten Conference players for the 1985 Big Ten Conference football season.

Running back Lorenzo White and linebacker Larry Station were the only players unanimously selected as first-team players on all 20 ballots submitted by the members of the Associated Press (AP) media panel. Defensive end Mike Hammerstein followed with 19 first-team votes. In the UPI balloting among conference coaches, Illinois wide receiver David Williams received the most votes, having been named to the first team by nine of the conference's ten coaches. In the UPI voting, Iowa's Chuck Long edged Jim Everett by one vote for the first-team quarterback position.

The Iowa Hawkeyes won the Big Ten championship and led the conference with eight first-team players, including quarterback Chuck Long and linebacker Larry Station. The Michigan Wolverines led the nation in scoring defense and placed six players on the first-team units, including defensive linemen Mike Hammerstein and Mark Messner and linebacker Mike Mallory.

== Offensive selections ==
=== Quarterbacks ===
- Chuck Long, Iowa (AP-1; UPI-1)
- Jim Everett, Purdue (AP-2; UPI-2)

=== Running backs ===
- Lorenzo White, Michigan State (AP-1; UPI-1)
- Ronnie Harmon, Iowa (AP-1; UPI-1)
- Rodney Carter, Purdue (AP-2; UPI-1)
- Larry Emery, Wisconsin (AP-2; UPI-2)
- George Cooper, Ohio State (UPI-2)
- Bobby Howard, Indiana (UPI-2)

=== Centers ===
- Bob Maggs, Ohio State (AP-1; UPI-1)
- Ray Hitchcock, Minnesota (AP-2; UPI-2)

=== Guards ===
- Jim Juriga, Illinois (AP-1; UPI-1)
- John Wojciechowski, Michigan State (AP-1; UPI-2)
- Bob Landsee, Wisconsin (AP-2; UPI-1)
- Jon Lilleberg, Minnesota (AP-2)
- Tom Humphrey, Iowa (UPI-2)

=== Tackles ===
- Mike Haight, Iowa (AP-1; UPI-1)
- Clay Miller, Michigan (AP-1; UPI-2)
- Rory Graves, Ohio State (AP-2; UPI-1)
- Steve Bogdalek, Michigan State (AP-2)
- Bob Riley, Indiana (UPI-2)

=== Tight ends ===
- Eric Kattus, Michigan (AP-1; UPI-2 [WR])
- Mike Flagg, Iowa (AP-2)

=== Receivers ===
- David Williams, Illinois (AP-1; UPI-1)
- Cris Carter, Ohio State (AP-1; UPI-1)
- Bill Happel, Iowa (AP-2; UPI-2)
- Kenny Allen, Indiana (AP-2)

== Defensive selections ==
=== Defensive linemen ===
- Jeff Drost, Iowa (AP-1; UPI-1)
- Mike Hammerstein, Michigan (AP-1; UPI-1)
- Hap Peterson, Iowa (AP-1; UPI-1)
- Mark Messner, Michigan (AP-1; UPI-2)
- Guy Teafatiller, Illinois (AP-2; UPI-1)
- Eric Kumerow, Ohio State (AP-2; UPI-2)
- Tim Jordan, Wisconsin (AP-2)
- Larry Joyner, Minnesota (AP-2)
- Billy Harris, Michigan (UPI-2)
- Kelly Quinn, Michigan State (UPI-2)

=== Linebackers ===
- Pepper Johnson, Ohio State (AP-1; UPI-1)
- Mike Mallory, Michigan (AP-1; UPI-1)
- Chris Spielman, Ohio State (AP-1; UPI-1)
- Larry Station, Iowa (AP-1; UPI-1)
- Shane Bullough, Michigan State (AP-2; UPI-2)
- Andy Moeller, Michigan (AP-2; UPI-2)
- Peter Najarian, Minnesota (AP-2; UPI-2)
- Craig Raddatz, Wisconsin (AP-2)
- Mark Tagart, Illinois (UPI-2)

=== Defensive backs ===
- Brad Cochran, Michigan (AP-1; UPI-1)
- Rod Woodson, Purdue (AP-1; UPI-1)
- Jay Norvell, Iowa (AP-1)
- Phil Parker, Michigan State (UPI-1)
- Garland Rivers, Michigan (AP-2; UPI-2)
- Craig Swoope, Illinois (AP-2; UPI-2)
- Devon Mitchell, Iowa (AP-2)
- Terry White, Ohio State (UPI-2)

== Special teams ==
=== Kickers ===
- Chris White, Illinois (AP-2; UPI-1)
- Rob Houghtlin, Iowa (AP-1)
- Rich Spangler, Ohio State (UPI-2)

=== Punters ===
- Greg Montgomery, Michigan State (AP-1; UPI-2)
- Tom Tupa, Ohio State (AP-2; UPI-1)

== Key ==
AP = Associated Press, selected by a panel of 20 sports writers and broadcasters covering the Big Ten

UPI = United Press International, selected by the conference coaches

Bold = Consensus first-team selection of both the AP and UPI

== See also ==
- 1985 College Football All-America Team
