= Mike Hammerstein =

American football player (born 1963)

No. 71
- Positions: Defensive tackle, defensive end

Personal information
- Born: March 3, 1963 (age 63); Kokomo, Indiana, U.S.
- Listed height: 6 ft 4 in (1.93 m)
- Listed weight: 270 lb (122 kg)

Career information
- High school: Wapakoneta (Wapakoneta, Ohio)
- College: Michigan
- NFL draft: 1986: 3rd round, 65th overall pick

Career history
- Cincinnati Bengals (1986–1990); Minnesota Vikings (1991)*
- * Offseason or practice squad member only

Awards and highlights
- Consensus All-American (1985); Big Ten Defensive Lineman of the Year (1985); First-team All-Big Ten (1985); Fiesta Bowl MVP (1985)

Career NFL statistics
- Sacks: 5.5
- Fumble recoveries: 1
- Stats at Pro Football Reference

Michael Scott Hammerstein (born March 3, 1963) is an American former professional football player who was a defensive lineman in the National Football League (NFL). He played college football for the Michigan Wolverines, principally as a defensive tackle, from 1981 to 1985. He was selected as a consensus All-American in 1985. Hammerstein played in the NFL for the Cincinnati Bengals from 1986 to 1987 and 1989 to 1990. He appeared in 56 NFL games, two of them as a starter at defensive end.

== Early life ==
Hammerstein was born in Kokomo, Indiana, in 1963. He was raised in Wapakoneta, Ohio, and attended Wapakoneta High School.

== College career ==
Hammerstein enrolled at the University of Michigan in 1981 and played college football for head coach Bo Schembechler's Michigan Wolverines football teams from 1981 to 1985. As freshman in 1981, he played on the offensive line and started one game at the middle guard position. As a sophomore in 1982, Hammerstein was moved to the defense. He started one game at defensive tackle in each of the 1982 and 1983 seasons.

Hammerstein emerged as a regular starter in 1984. He started all 12 games at defensive tackle for the 1984 Michigan team, while his brother Mark Hammerstein started four games on the offensive line. During the 1984 season, Hammerstein registered 53 tackles, two fumble recoveries, and an interception.

In his final year at Michigan, Hammerstein started all 12 games at defensive tackle. Hammerstein was paired on the defensive line with Mark Messner in 1985. Led by Hammerstein and Messner, the 1985 team went 10–1–1 and finished the year ranked #2 in the nation. The defense has been described as the best defense in the history of Michigan football. During the 1985 season, he tied Michigan's single season record for tackles for losses with 23 and set the record for yardage lost, sacking opponents for 112 yards lost.

At the end of the 1985 season, Hammerstein was selected as the Most Valuable Player on the 1985 Michigan team. He was also named the Most Valuable Player of the 1985 Fiesta Bowl (a 27–23 win over Nebraska) in which he registered two quarterback sacks. He was also recognized as a consensus first-team All-American in 1985, after receiving first-team honors from the Associated Press, United Press International, and the American Football Coaches Association.

Hammerstein finished his career as the third highest in Michigan football history in career tackles for loss with 37 for 116 yards.

== Professional career ==
Hammerstein was selected by the Cincinnati Bengals in the third round (65th overall pick) of the 1986 NFL draft. He signed a contract with the Bengals in late July 1986, and appeared in 56 games at the nose tackle and defensive end positions for the Bengals from 1986 to 1987 and 1989 to 1990 under head coach Sam Wyche. Hammerstein started only two games for the Bengals, both during the 1990 Cincinnati Bengals season. During his NFL career, Hammerstein had 5.5 quarterback sacks and one fumble recovery.
