= Phil Parker =

American football player and coach (born 1963)

Current position
- Title: Defensive coordinator
- Team: Iowa
- Conference: Big Ten
- Annual salary: $1,900,000**

Biographical details
- Born: March 13, 1963 (age 63); Lorain, Ohio, U.S.
- Education: Michigan State University

Playing career
- 1982–1985: Michigan State
- Position: Defensive back

Coaching career (HC unless noted)
- 1987: Michigan State (GA)
- 1988–1998: Toledo (DB)
- 1999–2011: Iowa (DB)
- 2012: Iowa (DC)
- 2013–present: Iowa (DC/DB)

Accomplishments and honors

Awards
- AFCA Assistant Coach of the Year (2023); Broyles Award (2023); Second-team All-American (1985); 3× First-team All-Big Ten (1983, 1984, 1985)

Phil Parker (born March 13, 1963) is the defensive coordinator for the Iowa Hawkeyes. A native of Lorain, Ohio, Parker was a first team all-Big Ten defensive back at Michigan State.

== Playing career ==
Parker was a four-year letterman at Marion L. Steele High School in Amherst, Ohio from 1978 to 1981. He played halfback and defensive back, and returned punts and kickoffs.

Parker played defensive back for Michigan State. He was first team all-Big Ten in 1983, 1984, and 1985. Parker was defensive MVP at Michigan State in 1983 and 1985. Parker was also named MVP of the 1984 Cherry Bowl. He was invited to the Hula Bowl after his senior season.

Parker earned second-team All-America honors as a senior.

== Coaching career ==
Parker began his coaching career as a graduate assistant at Michigan State. He then spent 11 seasons as a defensive backs coach for the University of Toledo. Following the retirement of Hayden Fry, Parker joined the coaching staff of Kirk Ferentz at the University of Iowa in 1999. He then spent 13 years as the defensive backs coach before being promoted to defensive coordinator following the departure of Norm Parker (no relation).

In 2023, Parker won the Broyles Award and the AFCA Assistant Coach of the Year Award, both of which honor the best assistant coach in college football.

== Personal life ==
Parker received an undergraduate degree from Michigan State in 1986. He and his wife, Sandy, have two children.
