= Peter Anderson (American football) =

American football player (born 1963)

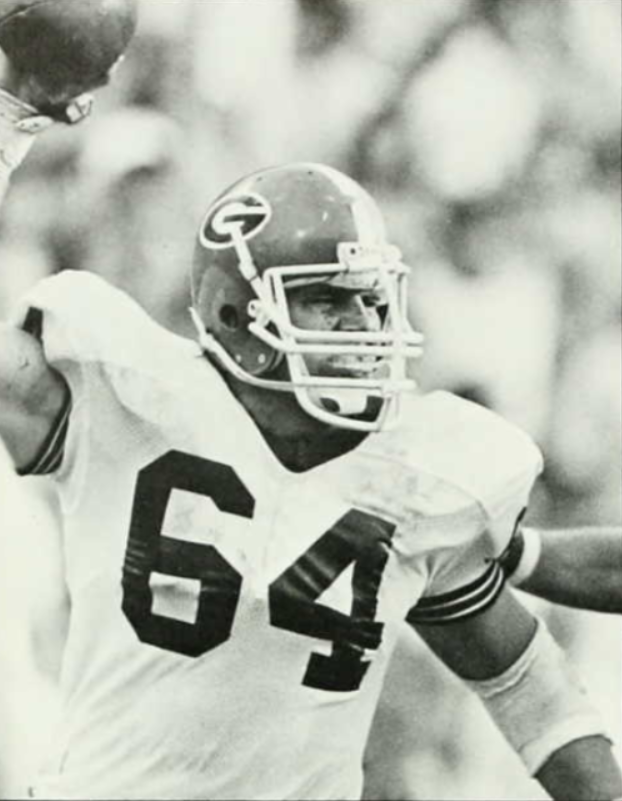

No. 64
- Position: Center

Personal information
- Born: October 1963 (age 63); Glen Ridge, New Jersey, U.S.

Career information
- High school: Glen Ridge (NJ)
- College: Georgia (1982–1985)

Awards and highlights
- Consensus All-American (1985); Jacobs Blocking Trophy (1985); First-team All-SEC (1985); Second-team All-SEC (1984)

Peter Anderson (born October 1963) is an American former football player. He played at the center position and was a consensus All-American while playing for the Georgia Bulldogs in 1985.

== University of Georgia ==
Raised in Glen Ridge, New Jersey, Anderson played prep football at Glen Ridge High School and enrolled at the University of Georgia where he played college football from 1983 to 1985 under head coach Vince Dooley. During Anderson's tenure with the Bulldogs, he played on the 1983 team that was ranked #4 in the country. As a junior in 1984, Anderson saw the Bulldogs fall to 7–4–1, including a 27-0 loss in the Florida–Georgia rivalry game. The loss to Florida in 1984 ended a six-game winning streak for Georgia.

As a senior, coach Dooley appointed Anderson as captain of the 1985 Georgia Bulldogs football team. He led an offensive line that allowed the Bulldogs to score 24 points against a Florida team that was ranked #1 in the country. Following the 1985 victory over Florida, Anderson said, "We restored order." At the end of his senior season, Anderson was a consensus first-team selection for the 1985 College Football All-America Team.

== Later life ==
After graduating from Georgia, Anderson was drafted in the 10th round (266th overall pick) by the Indianapolis Colts. He did not appear in any regular season games in the National Football League. He later went into the real estate development business. He moved to Jacksonville, Florida, in the mid-1990s and became associated with Pattillo Industrial Real Estate. Anderson and his wife, Shawn, have a son, Peter, and three daughters, Tory, Hailey and Susannah. In 2013, he was inducted into the Florida-Georgia Hall of Fame.
