= Jerry Quaerna =

American football player (born 1963)

No. 68
- Position: Offensive tackle

Personal information
- Born: October 9, 1963 (age 63); Janesville, Wisconsin, U.S.
- Listed height: 6 ft 6 in (1.98 m)
- Listed weight: 275 lb (125 kg)

Career information
- High school: Fort Atkinson
- College: Michigan (1982–1986)
- NFL draft: 1987: undrafted

Career history
- Detroit Lions (1987)

Career NFL statistics
- Games played: 3
- Games started: 3
- Stats at Pro Football Reference

Jerold Oscar Quaerna (born October 9, 1963) was an American professional football player. A native of Janesville, Wisconsin, he played college football at the offensive tackle position for the Michigan Wolverines football team at the University of Michigan from 1982 to 1986. By his senior year, he was six feet, seven inches tall and weighed 295 pounds. He started a total of four games at Michigan, two for the 1985 team and two for the 1986 team. After graduating from Michigan, Quaerna started three games in the National Football League for the Detroit Lions during the 1987 NFL strike.

== See also ==
- List of Detroit Lions players
