= 1986 Fiesta Bowl =

1986 Sunkist Fiesta Bowl
- 15th Fiesta Bowl
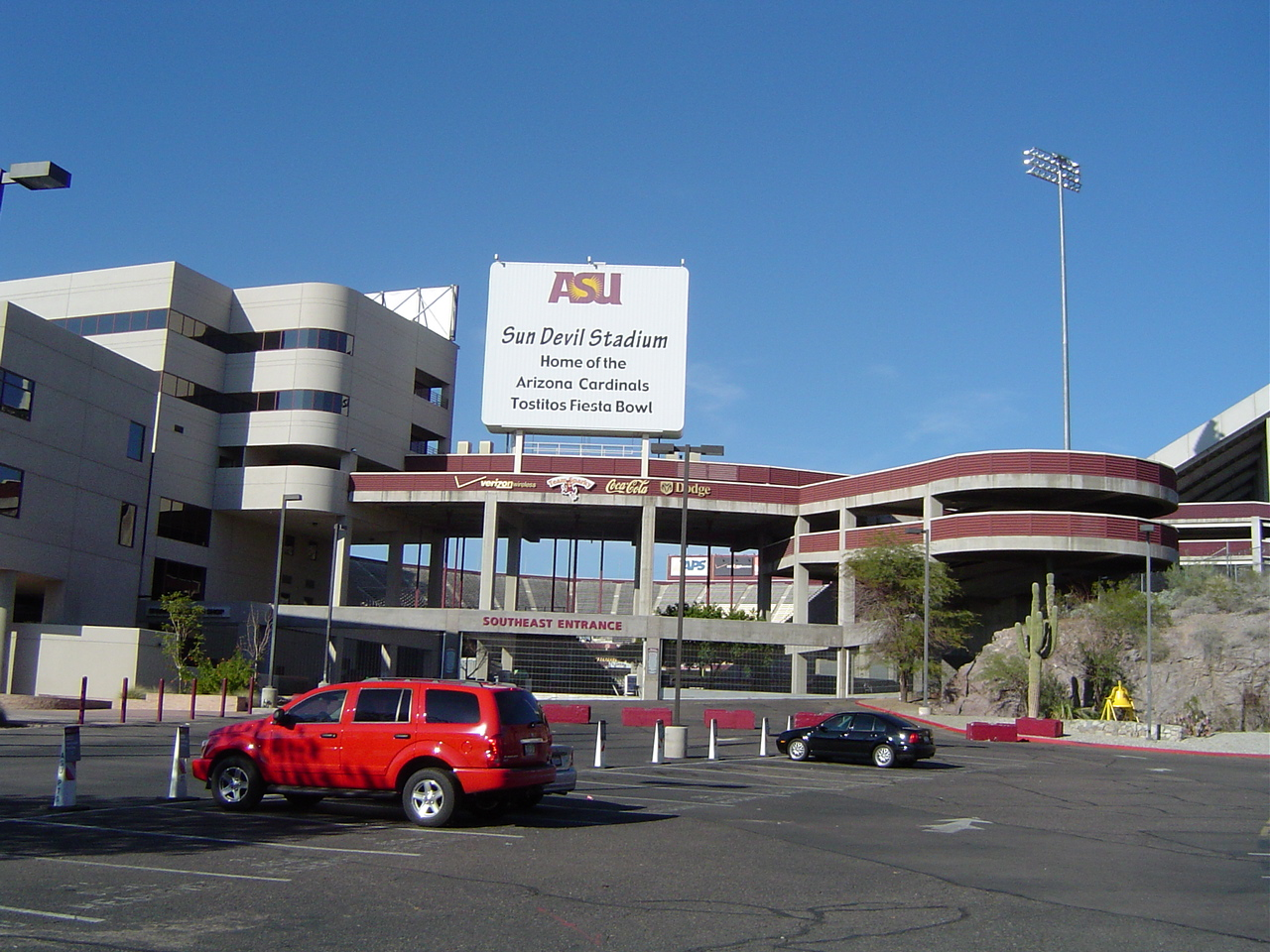
- Sun Devil Stadium in Tempe, Arizona, hosted the Fiesta Bowl.
Nebraska Cornhuskers	Michigan Wolverines
(9–2)	(9–1–1)
Big 8	Big Ten
23	27
Head coach: Tom Osborne	Head coach: Bo Schembechler
AP / Coaches; 7 / 6	AP / Coaches; 5 / 5
	1	2	3	4	Total
Nebraska	0	14	0	9	23
Michigan	3	0	24	0	27
- Date: January 1, 1986
- Season: 1985
- Stadium: Sun Devil Stadium
- Location: Tempe, Arizona
- MVP: Jamie Morris (Michigan RB); Mark Messner (Michigan DT)
- Favorite: Michigan by 3 points
- Referee: Jack Baker (WAC)
- Attendance: 72,454

United States TV coverage
- Network: NBC
- Announcers: Charlie Jones, Sam Rutigliano

The 1986 Fiesta Bowl was the 15th edition of the Fiesta Bowl, a college football bowl game, played at Sun Devil Stadium in Tempe, Arizona, on Wednesday, January 1. Part of the 1985–86 bowl game season, it matched the fifth-ranked Michigan Wolverines of the Big Ten Conference and the seventh-ranked Nebraska Cornhuskers of the Big Eight Conference; both were runners-up in their respective conferences.

Behind by 11 points at halftime, Michigan took advantage of Nebraska turnovers, scored 24 points in the third quarter, and prevailed by a score of 27–23. Running back Jamie Morris and defensive tackle Mark Messner, both Wolverines, were named the game's MVPs.

This was the third matchup of top-10 teams in the Fiesta Bowl; the prior two were in January 1982 and December 1975. This was the first bowl game with a corporate title sponsor, as bowl organizers had reached agreement with Sunkist Growers in September 1985, making the game officially the Sunkist Fiesta Bowl.

== Teams ==
=== Nebraska ===
The Cornhuskers opened the season with a home loss to Florida State, won nine straight, then lost at rival Oklahoma. This was their second appearance in the Fiesta Bowl, returning after a decade.

=== Michigan ===
The Wolverines opened with five wins and were ranked second, but lost by two points at top-ranked Iowa. Two weeks later, they tied Illinois. This was Michigan's first Fiesta Bowl appearance.

== Game summary ==
The opener of a bowl tripleheader on NBC (Rose, Orange), the game kicked off shortly after 11:30 a.m. MST, as did the Cotton Bowl on CBS, which matched the #16 Auburn Tigers with the #11 Texas A&M Aggies.

Michigan opened the game on offense and scored on a 42-yard field goal from Pat Moons with less than four minutes elapsed. In the second quarter, Nebraska scored on a five-yard pass from quarterback McCathorn Clayton to running back Doug DuBose to give Nebraska the lead. DuBose scored again on a three-yard run to give Nebraska a 14–3 advantage at the half.

Michigan dominated the third quarter, aided by Husker miscues. DuBose fumbled on the third play of the second half and the Wolverines recovered at the Husker 21. Gerald White scored four plays later from a yard out to pull Michigan to within four points. Clayton fumbled on Nebraska's ensuing possession, and Michigan quickly capitalized again, this time on Jim Harbaugh's one-yard quarterback sneak, putting Michigan ahead 17–14 just over four minutes into the third quarter. Following a blocked Nebraska punt, Moons kicked his second field goal of the game, a 19-yarder. Later in the third, Harbaugh scored his second rushing touchdown of the game, a two-yard run, to give Michigan a comfortable 27–14 advantage.

In the fourth quarter, Nebraska head coach Tom Osborne decided to spark his sputtering offense by inserting talented freshman quarterback Steve Taylor. He drove the Huskers 64 yards from their own three-yard line, driving deep into Michigan territory, but turned it over on downs. However, the Nebraska defense forced a three-and-out and was able to drive 77 yards in 12 plays, capped by Taylor's one-yard touchdown run to cut Michigan's lead to six points at 27–21, with less than three minutes remaining.

Michigan found itself backed up in the shadow of its own goal post. Rather than risk disaster, they opted for an intentional safety with 1:22 remaining in the game, and punter Monte Robbins deliberately ran out of the end zone. Trailing by four points and no time outs, the Huskers set out from their own 46. The Wolverines intercepted an errant Taylor pass in the end zone to kill Nebraska's final threat.

Morris was the leading rusher of the game with 156 yards on 22 carries (7.1 avg.).

The attendance of 72,454 at this Fiesta Bowl was a record for a sporting event in Arizona.

=== Scoring ===
First quarter

- Michigan – Pat Moons 42-yard field goal

Second quarter

- Nebraska – Doug DuBose 5-yard pass from McCathorn Clayton (Dale Klein kick)
- Nebraska – DuBose 3-yard run (Klein kick)

Third quarter

- Michigan – Gerald White 1-yard run (Moons kick)
- Michigan – Jim Harbaugh 1-yard run (Moons kick)
- Michigan – Moons 19-yard field goal
- Michigan – Harbaugh 2-yard run (Moons kick)

Fourth quarter

- Nebraska – Steve Taylor 1-yard run (Klein kick)
- Nebraska – Safety, Michigan punter Monte Robbins purposely ran out of end zone

== Statistics ==
Statistics	Nebraska	Michigan
First downs	20	16
Rushes–yards	60–304	49–171
Passing yards	66	63
Passes	6–15–1	6–16–0
Total offense	75–370	65–234
Punts–average	3–40	5–44
Fumbles–lost	6–3	2–0
Turnovers	4	0
Penalties–yards	7–46	8–43
Time of possession	32:01	27:59

== Aftermath ==
The win improved head coach Bo Schembechler's bowl record to 3–10 (.231); Michigan (10–1–1) climbed to second in the final AP poll, and Nebraska (9–3) fell to eleventh. In the previous season, unranked Michigan lost the Holiday Bowl (to top-ranked BYU) and finished at 6–6.

Until 2022, this was Michigan's sole appearance in the Fiesta Bowl; Nebraska's next was two years later.
