= Devon Mitchell =

Jamaican gridiron football player (born 1962)

No. 31
- Position: Safety

Personal information
- Born: December 30, 1962 (age 63); Kingston, Jamaica
- Listed height: 6 ft 1 in (1.85 m)
- Listed weight: 194 lb (88 kg)

Career information
- High school: Samuel J. Tilden (Brooklyn, New York)
- College: Iowa
- NFL draft: 1986: 4th round, 92nd overall pick

Career history
- Detroit Lions (1986–1988); Buffalo Bills (1990)*
- * Offseason or practice squad member only

Awards and highlights
- PFWA All-Rookie Team (1986); First-team All-Big Ten (1984); Second-team All-Big Ten (1985)

Career NFL statistics
- Interceptions: 8
- INT yards: 148
- Touchdowns: 1
- Stats at Pro Football Reference

Devon Dermott Mitchell (born December 30, 1962) is a former American football safety in the National Football League (NFL). He was selected by the Detroit Lions in the fourth round of the 1986 NFL draft with the 92nd overall pick. He played college football at Iowa. Currently holds the record for most interceptions for the Iowa Hawkeyes.
