= Brad Cochran =

American football player (born 1963)

No. 30 – Michigan Wolverines
- Position: Defensive back

Personal information
- Born: June 17, 1963 (age 63); Royal Oak, Michigan, U.S.
- Listed height: 6 ft 3 in (1.91 m)
- Listed weight: 219 lb (99 kg)

Career information
- High school: Brother Rice, Birmingham, MI
- College: University of Michigan (1981-1985)

Awards and highlights
- Consensus All-American (1985); First-team All-Big Ten (1985); Second-team All-Big Ten (1984)

Bradley Cochran (born June 17, 1963) is an American former college football player who was a defensive back for the Michigan Wolverines from 1981 to 1985. As a senior, Cochran was recognized as a consensus All-American. He also received the 1985 Toyota Leadership Award. He signed to play professional football with the Los Angeles Raiders, but injured his back during the preseason of his rookie year, ending his football career.

== Early life ==
Cochran was born in Royal Oak, Michigan, in 1963. He attended Brother Rice High School in Birmingham, Michigan.

== University of Michigan ==
Cochran enrolled at the University of Michigan in 1981 and played college football as an inside linebacker for head coach Bo Schembechler's Michigan Wolverines football teams from 1981 to 1985. Cochran left the Michigan team early in his career after "screaming uncontrollably" at coach Schembechler for perceived injustices. He was diagnosed with severe depression caused by a hormonal imbalance that was subsequently treated with medication. He briefly transferred to the University of Colorado, but he returned to his home in Royal Oak after several weeks in Colorado. In June 1983, Michigan assistant coach Lloyd Carr contacted Cochran and invited him to return to the University of Michigan.

After returning to Schembechler's good graces, Cochran started all 12 games at strong side cornerback for the 1983 Michigan Wolverines football team that compiled a 9-3 record, played in the 1984 Sugar Bowl, and finished the season ranked #8 in the final AP Poll. He moved to weak side cornerback as a junior, again starting all 12 games for the 1984 Michigan team.

As a senior, Cochran was a team co-captain started all 12 games as the weak side cornerback for the 1985 Michigan team that compiled a 10-1-1 record and a #2 ranking in the final Associated Press poll after beating Nebraska, 27-23, in the Fiesta Bowl. The 1985 Wolverines defense gave up only 75 points in 11 regular season games — an average of 6.8 points per game. At the end of the 1985 season, Cochran was selected as a consensus first-team defensive back on the 1985 College Football All-America Team. He was named first-team All-American by UPI and Kodak and second-team All-American by the Associated Press. Cochran also received the 1985 Toyota Leadership Award for "outstanding performance in the areas of team contributions, academics and citizenship."

Over the course of his career at Michigan, Cochran started 36 consecutive games from 1983 to 1985 and compiled 184 tackles, 17 pass breakups and 11 interceptions. The University of Michigan's Bentley Historical Library described Cochran's contributions this way: "Consistency and excellence best describe Brad Cochran's tour of duty with the Wolverines. Possessing exceptional speed and agility, he proved extremely durable, never missing a start over the final three years of his brilliant career."

== Later life ==
Cochran was selected by the Los Angeles Raiders in the third round (80th overall pick) of the 1986 NFL draft. Cochran signed a three-year contract with the Los Angeles Raiders in July 1986, but he injured his back during the fourth pre-season game, underwent surgery to remove a disc and perform a two-level vertebrae fusion, thus ending his football career. He later became involved in a contract dispute with the Raiders over the team's claim that he failed to report for the 1987 NFL season.

Cochran later worked as an assistant football coach responsible for the defensive secondary at his alma mater, Brother Rice High School.

== See also ==
- List of Michigan Wolverines football All-Americans
