= Eric Kattus =

American football player (born 1963)

No. 84, 49
- Position: Tight end

Personal information
- Born: March 4, 1963 (age 63); Cincinnati, Ohio, U.S.
- Listed height: 6 ft 5 in (1.96 m)
- Listed weight: 240 lb (109 kg)

Career information
- High school: Colerain (Cincinnati)
- College: Michigan
- NFL draft: 1986: 4th round, 91st overall pick

Career history
- Cincinnati Bengals (1986–1991); New York Jets (1992)

Awards and highlights
- Third-team All-American (1985); First-team All-Big Ten (1985); Michigan Wolverines Captain

Career NFL statistics
- Receptions: 66
- Yards: 698
- Touchdowns: 5
- Stats at Pro Football Reference

John Eric Kattus (born March 4, 1963) is an American former professional football player who was a tight end in the National Football League (NFL), primarily for the Cincinnati Bengals. He also played briefly for the New York Jets. Kattus played college football for the Michigan Wolverines, serving as captain of the team in 1985. He was also a member of the 1982 Big Ten Conference champions.

== College ==
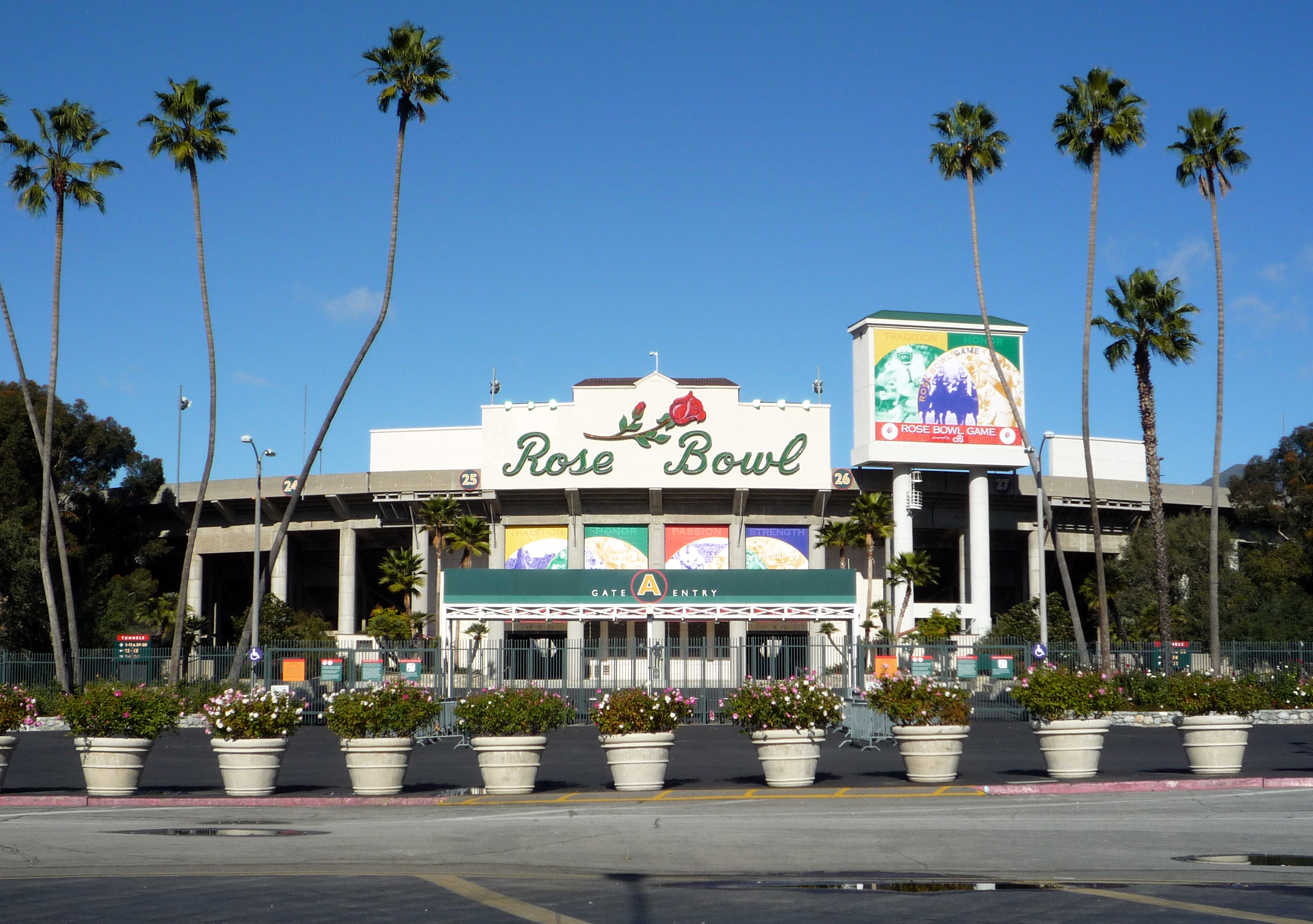
Kattus' and the 1982 Big Ten Conference Champions went to the 1983 Rose Bowl.

After attending Colerain High School, Kattus spent five years at the University of Michigan, where he sat as a redshirt for one year and was a varsity letterman for four, while wearing the #81.

As a redshirt freshman, he was a member of the 1982 Big Ten Champions who went to the Rose Bowl. At the University of Michigan he earned All Big Ten Conference honors in his senior season. He was captain and started all 12 games for Bo Schembechler's Michigan team that ended the season ranked #2 in both the AP and UPI polls after a Fiesta Bowl victory over the Nebraska Cornhuskers gave them a 10-1-1 record for the season.

Kattus caught eight touchdown passes for the Wolverines among his 38 receptions for 582 yards. In each of the three games he caught six passes that season, Kattus also scored at least one touchdown: twice, he scored two. In another game where he caught five passes, he had his only collegiate 100 yard game, totaling 123 yards and a touchdown.

His senior season was quite a progression from his previous seasons, which totaled seven receptions for 60 yards and two touchdowns.

Kattus was a third-team All-American selection as a senior.

== Professional career ==
Kattus was selected in the fourth round of the 1986 NFL draft by his hometown Cincinnati Bengals with the 91st pick overall. He played for the Bengals for the first six years of his NFL career from 1986 to 1991. During that time, he had modest success, with his best season being 1987 when he totaled 217 receiving yards on 18 receptions with two touchdowns. He also played on special teams and fielded an occasional squib kick return.

In his six years with the Bengals, they won two American Football Conference Central Division championships (1988 & 1990). In 1988, they won their conference championship, but lost to the San Francisco 49ers in Super Bowl XXIII. However, Kattus was not on the Super Bowl game day roster. The Bengals also had winning season in his rookie year of 1986, going 10-6, but missing the playoffs. The Bengals did not have winning records in any of his other seasons with the team.

Kattus spent his entire Bengals career in the shadow of fellow tight end Rodney Holman, who played for the Bengals from 1982 to 1992 and went to the Pro Bowl three consecutive years from 1988 to 1990. The only season during Kattus' Bengals tenure that Holman did not play all 16 regular season games was in 1987 - the season Kattus had his best year. The Bengals played five playoff games during Kattus' years in Cincinnati, but Kattus only caught a pass in one. In fact, he caught two passes for nineteen yards and a touchdown in the first-round Wild Card game of the 1990-91 NFL playoffs against the Houston Oilers.

He caught no passes as a member of Bruce Coslet's last place 1992 New York Jets - his final season. Kattus had signed with the Jets after regular tight end Johnny Mitchell was placed on injured reserve. Coslet had been the Bengals' offensive coordinator and, as a result of the similarities in offensive schemes, Kattus was familiar with the Jets' offensive scheme. However, Kattus was cut when both Mitchell and Siupeli Malamala were reactivated four weeks later.

== See also ==
- List of Michigan Wolverines football receiving leaders
