= Mark Messner =

American football player (born 1965)

No. 60
- Positions: Defensive tackle, linebacker

Personal information
- Born: December 29, 1965 (age 60); Riverview, Michigan, U.S.
- Listed height: 6 ft 2 in (1.88 m)
- Listed weight: 256 lb (116 kg)

Career information
- High school: Detroit Catholic Central
- College: Michigan
- NFL draft: 1989: 6th round, 161st overall pick

Career history
- Los Angeles Rams (1989)

Awards and highlights
- Unanimous All-American (1988); First-team All-American (1987); 2× Third-team All-American (1985, 1986); 4× First-team All-Big Ten (1985-1988); Big Ten Defensive Lineman of the Year (1988); Japan Bowl MVP (1989); Fiesta Bowl co-MVP (1986); University of Michigan Athletic Hall of Honor (2014)

Career NFL statistics
- Games played: 4
- Stats at Pro Football Reference
- College Football Hall of Fame

Mark W. Messner (born December 29, 1965) is an American former professional football player who was a linebacker for the Los Angeles Rams of the National Football League (NFL) during the 1989 season. He sustained a serious knee injury in the 1989-90 NFC Championship Game against the San Francisco 49ers and never played in another game.

Messner played college football at the University of Michigan. He started every game, 49 in all, at defensive tackle for Michigan from 1985 to 1988. He was the first position player ever to be selected as a first-team All-Big Ten Conference player all four years.

Messner was also a four-time All-American, earning third-team selections in 1985 and 1986, first-team in 1987, and unanimous honors in 1987.

He set still holds Michigan records for quarterback sacks in a game (5), career tackles for loss (70), and career sacks (36). He was inducted into the University of Michigan Athletic Hall of Honor in 2014.

== Early years and family ==
Messner was born in Riverview, Michigan, a southern suburb of Detroit, in 1965. His biological father, Max Messner, was a linebacker for the Detroit Lions and Pittsburgh Steelers from 1960 to 1965.

Messner's parents divorced when he was young, and he was raised by his mother and stepfather, Del Pretty, who ran a piano store in Livonia, Michigan. Messner referred to his biological father as the "fun" dad and Pretty as the "disciplinarian." In a 1988 interview with Mitch Albom, Messner referred to Pretty as "the most important person in my life. He's the reason I do what I do, and try as hard as I try." He later noted that Pretty "raised me, fed me, spanked me, hugged me, took me to school, wrote me poems, came to all my football games and made me feel like the most important person in the world. Pretty was diagnosed with lymph node cancer in 1980 and eventually died from the disease in December 1989 when Messner was a rookie with the Los Angeles Rams.

Messner was a hyperactive child for whom football was an outlet to unleash his energy. He grew up in Hartland, Michigan, and attended Hartland High School from 1980 to 1981 before transferring to Detroit Catholic Central High School, which was then located in Redford, Michigan. He played at the tight end and nose guard positions for Catholic Central in 1982 and 1983 and earned all-state and high school All-American honors as a senior, and graduated in 1984. He was later inducted into both the Catholic Central and Catholic League Halls of Fame.

== University of Michigan ==
Messner enrolled at the University of Michigan in 1984 and played college football as a defensive tackle for head coach Bo Schembechler's Michigan Wolverines football teams from 1985 to 1988.

At six feet, three inches, Messner was small for his position. He adjusted for his size by playing with speed and intelligence. Messner once described his approach as follows: "I try to move with quickness toward his weakness. I try to get away from where he is leaning, like a matador steps around a bull." The Los Angeles Times in January 1989 called him "a quarterback's worst enemy." Another writer described him as "a combination Dennis the Menace and Henry David Thoreau, a philosopher with a cowlick" and "Aristotle in a jockstrap." Messner noted that it was his goal to play with "youthful intensity" like "a young kid."

=== 1985 season ===
Messner was a redshirt who did not play during the 1984 season. As a redshirt freshman, he started all 12 games at defensive tackle for the 1985 Michigan Wolverines football team that compiled a 10-1-1 record, was ranked #2 in the final AP Poll, held opponents to 75 points in the regular season (6.8 points per game), and defeated Nebraska in the 1986 Fiesta Bowl. Despite his lack of college experience, Messner set a new Michigan record in 1985 with 11 quarterback sacks and also totaled 71 tackles and 14 tackles for loss. He was also named the Defensive Player of the Game in the 1986 Fiesta Bowl after he registered nine tackles, forced a fumble, and recovered another. He was also selected as a first-team defensive lineman on the 1985 All-Big Ten team.

=== 1986 season ===
In his second year, Messner started all 13 games at defensive tackle for the 1986 Michigan team that compiled an 11–2 record, tied for the Big Ten Conference championship, and lost to Arizona State in the 1987 Rose Bowl. For the second consecutive year, Messner was selected as a first-team defensive lineman on the All-Big Ten team.

=== 1987 season ===
As a junior, Messner again started every game, 12 in all, at defensive tackle for the 1987 Wolverines. He had 11 sacks during the 1987 season. His five sacks against Northwestern on October 31, 1987, remains a Michigan single-game record. At the end of the season, he was selected by the Sporting News as a first-team defensive lineman on the 1987 All-America Team. He was also voted by his teammates as Michigan's defensive player of the year.

=== 1988 season ===
Prior to the 1988 season, the Sporting News featured a photograph of Messner and coach Schembechler on the cover of its preseason issue ranking Michigan #1 in the country. During the 1988 season, Messner started every game at defensive tackle for the fourth consecutive year. In all, he started 49 consecutive games for Michigan starting with the opening game of his redshirt freshman year. He was selected as a co-captain and Most Valuable Player on the 1988 Michigan team that lost its opening two games against #1-ranked Miami (by one point) and eventual national champion Notre Dame (by two points), then went undefeated for the remaining 10 games, and defeated USC in the 1989 Rose Bowl. Messner had eight sacks and set a Michigan record in 1988 with 26 tackles for loss. After the 1988 season, Messner was selected as a consensus first-team defensive lineman on the 1988 All-America Team. He was also selected to play in the Hula Bowl and the Japan Bowl post-season all-star games.

=== Career overview and honors ===
Messner was the first position player in the Big Ten Conference to be selected as a first-team all-conference player in four consecutive years. Only one other Michigan player, Chris Hutchinson (1989–1992), has matched the feat. In four years at Michigan, Messner totaled 248 tackles and five fumble recoveries. He remains Michigan's all-time career leader in tackles for loss (70), tackles for sack yardage (376 yards), sacks (36), and sack yardage (273 yards). He was also Michigan's sack leader each year from 1985 to 1987.

In 2014, Messner was inducted into the University of Michigan Athletic Hall of Honor. He has also been included on the ballot for possible induction into the College Football Hall of Fame in both 2013 and 2014.

== Professional football ==
Pre-draft measurables
Height	Weight	40-yard dash	10-yard split	20-yard split	20-yard shuttle	Vertical jump	Broad jump	Bench press
6 ft 2 3/4 in (1.90 m)	256 lb (116 kg)	5.24 s	1.81 s	3.02 s	4.63 s	23.0 in (0.58 m)	7 ft 10 in (2.39 m)	11 reps
All values from NFL Combine

Messner was selected in the sixth round (161st overall pick) of the 1989 NFL draft by the Los Angeles Rams. He was drafted lower than had been anticipated, and an Associated Press story reported that NFL representatives believed his speed and size (6'3", 255 pounds) made him "too small for an NFL defensive tackle and too slow for a linebacker."

Messner appeared in only four regular season games, none as a starter, for the Rams during their 1989 season. On January 14, 1990, he sustained a career-ending knee injury in the 1989-90 NFC Championship Game against the San Francisco 49ers and never played in another game. The injury resulted in tears to his anterior (ACL), lateral and medial cruciate ligaments. Messner recalled, "My knee injury was a dandy for my one and only football injury ... Last time I ever put on football gear. Bad day!"

== Later years and family ==
Messner married Jennifer Rybarz Messner in January 2002. He has four children, Mitchell Messner, Justin Messner, Bailey Reiter and Mckenna Reiter.

After retiring from football, Messner worked for Eastman Kodak Company and later for Canon Business Solutions and Konica Minolta Business Solutions U.S.A. He was a region vice president for Canon from March 2009 to July 2010 based in Farmington Hills, Michigan. Since July 2010, he has been a vice president of Konica Minolta in Tampa, Florida and CPQ Champion.
