= Mike Gillette =

American football and baseball player

No. 19
- Positions: Placekicker, punter

Personal information
- Born: March 17, 1967 (age 59)
- Listed height: 6 ft 1 in (1.85 m)
- Listed weight: 185 lb (84 kg)

Career information
- High school: St. Joseph (MI)
- College: University of Michigan (1985–1988)

Awards and highlights
- First-team All-Big Ten (1988)

Michael V. Gillette (born March 17, 1967) is an American former football and baseball player. He was a placekicker for the University of Michigan Wolverines football team from 1985 to 1988 and a punter for the 1988 team. He also played baseball for Michigan, and later played professionally in the minor leagues. Gillette finished his college football career is the leading scorer in Michigan football history with 295 points on 53 field goals, 130 extra points, and one touchdown. He also set Michigan records for the longest field goal (56 yards) and most field goals in a single game (five).

== Football career ==
Gillette grew up in St. Joseph, Michigan, and was an all-state quarterback, placekicker and punter at St. Joseph High School. He enrolled at the University of Michigan in 1985.

Gillette had the best season of his career in 1988 and was selected by conference coaches for the United Press International as a first-team kicker on the 1988 All-Big Ten Conference football team. High and low points of Gillette's 1988 season include the following:

- On September 10, 1988, Gillette missed a 48-yard field goal attempt with three seconds left in a 19-17 loss to Notre Dame.
- On October 8, 1988, Gillette ran 40 yards for a touchdown on a fake punt against Michigan State. With a total of 11 points in the game (a field goal and two extra points in addition to his touchdown), he became Michigan's all-time leading scorer, passing the mark of 244 points set by Anthony Carter from 1979 to 1982.
- On October 15, 1986, Gillette kicked a game-winning 34-yard field goal as time ran out in a 20-17 victory over Iowa.
- On November 5, 1988, Gillette kicked five field goals in a 22-7 victory over Minnesota. Gillette's five field goals broke the prior Michigan record of four field goals established by Bob Wood in 1975 and tied by Bob Bergeron in 1984.
- On November 19, 1988, Gillette kicked two field goals in Michigan's 34-31 victory over Ohio State. His second field goal against the Buckeyes covered 56 yards, breaking his own record set two years earlier for the longest field goal in Michigan football history.
- On January 1, 1989, in his final game for Michigan, Gillette kicked a 49-yard field goal in Michigan's 22-14 victory over USC in the 1989 Rose Bowl. Gillette's 49-yard field goal against USC was the Michigan record for the longest field goal in a bowl game until Quinn Nordin kicked a 57 yarder in the 2020 citrus bowl.

During his four years at Michigan, Gillette was successful on 53 of 75 field goal attempts for 159 points. He also successfully converted 130 of 133 extra point attempts, and ran for a touchdown, giving him a total of 295 points during his Michigan football career.

== Baseball career ==
In addition to his kicking duties, Gillette also played college baseball for the Wolverines. In the summer of 1987, he played catcher for the Harwich Mariners of the Cape Cod Baseball League. When he had to leave the team before the end of the season to return to school for football practice, Gillette was replaced on the Mariners' roster by future major leaguer John Flaherty.

Gillette was selected by the Kansas City Royals in the 34th round of the 1988 MLB draft. He went on to play minor league baseball from 1990 to 1992.
