= 1985 All-America college football team =

Official list of the best college football players of 1985

The 1985 All-America college football team is composed of college football players who were selected as All-Americans by various organizations and writers that chose College Football All-America Teams in 1985. The National Collegiate Athletic Association (NCAA) recognizes five selectors as "official" for the 1985 season. They are: (1) the American Football Coaches Association (AFCA); (2) the Associated Press (AP) selected based on the votes of sports writers at AP newspapers; (3) the Football Writers Association of America (FWAA); (4) the United Press International (UPI) selected based on the votes of sports writers at UPI newspapers; and (5) the Walter Camp Football Foundation (WC). Other selectors included Football News (FN), Gannett News Service (GNS), the Newspaper Enterprise Association (NEA), Pro Football Weekly, Scripps Howard (SH), and The Sporting News (TSN).

Ten players were unanimously selected as first-team All-Americans by all five official selectors. They are:

- Bo Jackson, Auburn running back who rushed for 1,786 yards and won the 1985 Heisman Trophy;
- Chuck Long, Iowa quarterback who won the 1985 Davey O'Brien Award and Maxwell Award and placed second in the 1985 Heisman Trophy voting;
- Lorenzo White, Michigan State running back who became the first Big Ten Conference player to rush for over 2,000 yards and placed fourth in the 1985 Heisman Trophy voting;
- Brian Bosworth, Oklahoma linebacker who won the 1985 Dick Butkus Award;
- David Williams, Illinois wide receiver who caught 85 passes for 1,047 yards and finished his college career as the second leading receiver in NCAA history;
- Larry Station, Iowa linebacker who led the team in tackles for the fourth straight season with 129;
- John Lee, UCLA placekicker who set the NCAA record for highest percentage of extra points and field goals made in a career with 93.3% (116 of 117 PATs, 79 of 92 FGs);
- Jim Dombrowski, Virginia offensive tackle;
- Leslie O'Neal, Oklahoma defensive end; and
- Tim Green, Syracuse defensive end.

== Consensus All-Americans ==
The following charts identify the NCAA-recognized consensus All-Americans for the year 1985 and displays which first-team designations they received.

=== Offense ===
Name	Position	School	Number	Official	Other
Bo Jackson	Running back	Auburn	5/4/9	AFCA, AP, FWAA, UPI, WC	GNS, NEA, SH, TSN
Chuck Long	Quarterback	Iowa	5/4/9	AFCA, AP, FWAA, UPI, WC	GNS, NEA, SH, TSN
Lorenzo White	Running back	Michigan State	5/4/9	AFCA, AP, FWAA, UPI, WC	GNS, NEA, SH, TSN
David Williams	Wide receiver	Illinois	5/3/8	AFCA, AP, FWAA, UPI, WC	NEA, SH, TSN
Jim Dombrowski	Offensive tackle	Virginia	5/2/7	AFCA, AP, FWAA, UPI, WC	NEA, TSN
Jeff Bregel	Offensive guard	USC	4/3/7	AFCA, AP, FWAA, UPI	NEA, SH, TSN
Willie Smith	Tight end	Miami (Fla.)	3/3/6	AFCA, AP, WC	NEA, SH, TSN
Peter Anderson	Center	Georgia	3/2/5	AFCA, AP, UPI	GNS, TSN
Tim McGee	Wide receiver	Tennessee	2/3/5	AFCA, AP, UPI	GNS, NEA, SH
John Rienstra	Offensive guard	Temple	2/3/5	AP, FWAA	GNS, NEA, SH
Brian Jozwiak	Offensive tackle	West Virginia	3/0/3	AP, UPI, WC	-
J. D. Maarleveld	Offensive tackle	Maryland	2/1/3	AFCA, UPI	NEA
Jamie Dukes	Offensive guard	Florida State	2/1/3	FWAA, WC	SH
Reggie Dupard	Running back	SMU	1/0/1	FWAA	-
Napoleon McCallum	Running back	Navy	1/0/1	WC	-
Thurman Thomas	Running back	Oklahoma State	1/0/1	UPI	-

=== Defense ===
Name	Position	School	Number	Official	Other
Leslie O'Neal	Defensive end	Oklahoma State	5/4/9	AFCA, AP, FWAA, UPI, WC	GNS, NEA, SH, TSN
Tim Green	Defensive end	Syracuse	5/3/8	AFCA, AP, FWAA, UPI, WC	GNS, SH, TSN
Tony Casillas	Defensive tackle	Oklahoma	4/4/8	AP, FWAA, UPI, WC	GNS, NEA, SH, TSN
Larry Station	Linebacker	Iowa	5/2/7	AFCA, AP, FWAA, UPI, WC	NEA, SH
David Fulcher	Defensive back	Arizona State	4/3/7	AFCA, AP, UPI, WC	GNS, NEA, TSN
Brian Bosworth	Linebacker	Oklahoma	5/1/6	AFCA, AP, FWAA, UPI, WC	GNS
Mike Ruth	Middle guard	Boston College	4/2/6	AFCA, FWAA, UPI, WC	GNS, SH
Mike Hammerstein	Defensive tackle	Michigan	3/3/6	AFCA, AP, UPI	GNS, NEA, SH
Brad Cochran	Defensive back	Michigan	4/1/5	AFCA, FWAA, UPI, WC	SH
Scott Thomas	Defensive back	Air Force	3/1/4	AFCA, FWAA, WC	NEA
Johnny Holland	Linebacker	Texas A&M	2/0/2	AP, FWAA	-

=== Special teams ===
Name	Position	School	Number	Official	Other
John Lee	Placekicker	UCLA	5/4/9	AFCA, AP, FWAA, UPI, WC	GNS, NEA, SH, TSN
Barry Helton	Punter	Colorado	3/1/4	AP, UPI, WC	GNS

== Offense ==
=== Quarterbacks ===
- Chuck Long, Iowa (CFHOF) (AFCA, AP-1, FWAA, UPI-1, WC, GNS, NEA-1, SH, TSN)
- Vinny Testaverde, Miami (Fla.) (CFHOF) (AP-2, UPI-2, NEA-2)
- Jim Everett, Purdue (AP-3, NEA-2)

=== Running backs ===
- Bo Jackson, Auburn (CFHOF) (AFCA, AP-1, FWAA, UPI-1, WC, GNS, NEA-1, SH, TSN)
- Lorenzo White, Michigan State (CFHOF) (AFCA, AP-1, FWAA, UPI-1, WC, GNS, NEA-1, SH, TSN)
- Napoleon McCallum, Navy (CFHOF) (AP-2, WC)
- Reggie Dupard, SMU (AP-2, FWAA, UPI-2, NEA-2)
- Thurman Thomas, Oklahoma State (CFHOF) (AP-3, UPI-1)
- Doug DuBose, Nebraska (UPI-2)
- Paul Palmer, Temple (CFHOF) (UPI-2)
- Tom Rathman, Nebraska (AP-3)
- Ronnie Harmon, Iowa (NEA-2)

=== Wide receivers ===
- David Williams, Illinois (CFHOF) (AFCA, AP-1, FWAA, UPI-1, WC, NEA-1, SH, TSN)
- Tim McGee, Tennessee (AFCA, AP-1, UPI-1, GNS, NEA-1, SH)
- Lew Barnes, Oregon (AP-2, FWAA)
- Kelvin Martin, Boston College (TSN)
- Webster Slaughter, San Diego State (AP-2)
- Mark Bellini, BYU (AP-3, UPI-2)
- Walter Murray, Hawaii (AP-3, GNS)
- Richard Estell, Kansas (UPI-2)
- Reggie Bynum, Oregon State (NEA-2)
- Michael Irvin, Miami (Fla.) (NEA-2)

=== Tight ends ===
- Willie Smith, Miami (Fla.) (AFCA, AP-1, WC, NEA-1, SH, TSN)
- Brian Forster, Rhode Island (GNS)
- Keith Jackson, Oklahoma (CFHOF) (AP-2)
- Eric Kattus, Michigan (AP-3)
- William Harris, Texas (NEA-2)

=== Centers ===
- Peter Anderson, Georgia (AFCA, AP-1, UPI-1, GNS, TSN)
- Gene Chilton, Texas (AP-3, UPI-2, WC, NEA-1)
- Bill Lewis, Nebraska (AP-2, FWAA, NEA-2, SH)

=== Guards ===
- Jeff Bregel, USC (AFCA, AP-1, FWAA, UPI-1, NEA-1, SH, TSN)
- John Rienstra, Temple (AP-1, FWAA, GNS, NEA-1, SH)
- J. D. Maarleveld, Maryland (AFCA, UPI-1, NEA-1 [OT])
- Jamie Dukes, Florida State (AP-2, FWAA, UPI-2, WC, NEA-2, SH)
- Jeff Zimmerman, Florida (AP-3, UPI-2, WC, GNS, NEA-2, TSN)
- Tim Scannell, Notre Dame (SH)
- Todd Moules, Penn State (AP-3)

=== Tackles ===
- Jim Dombrowski, Virginia (CFHOF) (AFCA, AP-1, FWAA, UPI-1, WC, NEA-1, TSN)
- Brian Jozwiak, West Virginia (AP-1, UPI-1, WC, NEA-2)
- John Davis, Georgia Tech (TSN)
- Don Smith, Army (AFCA, AP-2 [G])
- James FitzPatrick, USC (GNS)
- Joe Milinichik, North Carolina State (GNS, NEA-2)
- John Clay, Missouri (AP-2)
- Doug Williams, Texas A&M (AP-2, UPI-2)
- Mark Cochran, Baylor (UPI-2)
- Steve Wallace, Auburn (AP-3)
- Will Wolford, Vanderbilt (AP-3)

== Defense ==
=== Defensive ends ===
- Leslie O'Neal, Oklahoma State (CFHOF) (AFCA, AP-1, FWAA, UPI-1, WC, GNS, NEA-1 [DT], SH, TSN)
- Tim Green, Syracuse (CFHOF) (AFCA, AP-1, FWAA, UPI-1, WC, GNS, NEA-2, SH, TSN)
- Pat Swilling, Georgia Tech (CFHOF) (FWAA, UPI-2, NEA-2)
- Jim Skow, Nebraska (AFCA, AP-2, UPI-2)

=== Defensive tackles ===
- Tony Casillas, Oklahoma (CFHOF) (AP-1, FWAA, UPI-1, WC, GNS, NEA-1 [NG], SH, TSN)
- Mike Hammerstein, Michigan (AFCA, AP-1, UPI-1, GNS, NEA-1, SH)
- Jon Hand, Alabama (NEA-2, TSN)
- Jerome Brown, Miami (Fla.) (AP-2)
- Mark Walen, UCLA (AP-2)
- Jason Buck, BYU (AP-3)
- Tim Johnson, Penn State (AP-3)
- Mark Messner, Michigan (CFHOF) (AP-3)

=== Middle guards ===
- Mike Ruth, Boston College (CFHOF) (AFCA, AP-2, FWAA, UPI-1, WC, GNS, NEA-2, SH)
- Jerry Ball, SMU (AP-3)

=== Linebackers ===
- Brian Bosworth, Oklahoma (CFHOF) (AFCA, AP-1, FWAA, UPI-1, WC, GNS, NEA-2)
- Larry Station, Iowa (CFHOF) (AFCA, AP-1, FWAA, UPI-1, WC, NEA-1, SH)
- Johnny Holland, Texas A&M (AP-1, FWAA, UPI-2)
- Cornelius Bennett, Alabama (CFHOF) (AP-2, UPI-2 [DL], WC, TSN)
- Pepper Johnson, Ohio State (UPI-1)
- Michael Brooks, LSU (AP-1, GNS, NEA-2, SH)
- Kevin Murphy, Oklahoma (AP-2, UPI-2 [line], NEA-1, TSN)
- Alonzo Johnson, Florida (AP-3, UPI-2 [line], GNS, SH, TSN)
- Shane Conlan, Penn State (CFHOF) (AP-3, UPI-2, NEA-1)
- Chris Spielman, Ohio State (CFHOF) (AP-3, NEA-1)
- Mike Mallory, Michigan (AP-3, UPI-2)
- John Offerdahl, Western Michigan (AP-2, NEA-2)

=== Defensive backs ===
- David Fulcher, Arizona State (CFHOF) (AFCA, AP-1, UPI-1, WC, GNS, NEA-1, TSN)
- Brad Cochran, Michigan (AFCA, AP-2, FWAA, UPI-1, WC, SH)
- Scott Thomas, Air Force (CFHOF) (AFCA, AP-3, FWAA, UPI-2, WC, NEA-1)
- Allen Durden, Arizona (AP-2, UPI-1, WC, NEA-1)
- Thomas Everett, Baylor (CFHOF) (AFCA, AP-1)
- Mark Moore, Oklahoma State (AP-1, UPI-2, GNS, NEA-2, TSN)
- Tim McDonald, USC (TSN)
- Mark Collins, Cal-State Fullerton (AP-3, GNS, NEA-2, TSN)
- Michael Zordich, Penn State (AP-2 [LB], FWAA, SH)
- Rod Woodson, Purdue (CFHOF) (NEA-1)
- Chris White, Tennessee (AP-2, SH)
- Phil Parker, Michigan State (UPI-2, NEA-2)
- Vestee Jackson, Washington (NEA-2)
- Greg Lasker, Arkansas (AP-3)

== Special teams ==
=== Placekickers ===
- John Lee, UCLA (AFCA, AP-1, FWAA, UPI-1, WC, GNS, NEA-1, SH, TSN)
- John Diettrich, Ball State (AP-2)
- Carlos Reveiz, Tennessee (AP-3, UPI-2)
- Chris White, Illinois (NEA-2)

=== Punters ===
- Barry Helton, Colorado (AP-1, UPI-1, WC, GNS, NEA-2)
- Lewis Colbert, Auburn (AFCA, UPI-2, TSN)
- Bill Smith, Mississippi (FWAA)
- Ray Criswell, Florida (NEA-1)
- Mark Simon, Air Force (AP-2, SH)
- Steve Kidd, Rice (AP-3)

=== Returners ===
- Erroll Tucker, Utah (FWAA, GNS, TSN)

== Key ==
- **Bold** – Consensus All-American
- -1 – First-team selection
- -2 – Second-team selection
- -3 – Third-team selection
- CFHOF = College Football Hall of Fame inductee

=== Official selectors ===
- AFCA – American Football Coaches Association (AFCA), selected by the members of the AFCA for the Kodak All-America team
- AP – Associated Press
- FWAA – Football Writers Association of America
- UPI – United Press International
- WC – Walter Camp Football Foundation

=== Other selectors ===
- FN – Football News
- GNS – Gannett News Service selected by Joel S. Buchsbaum
- NEA – Newspaper Enterprise Association
- PFW – Pro Football Weekly
- SH – Scripps Howard
- TSN – The Sporting News

== See also ==
- 1985 All-Atlantic Coast Conference football team
- 1985 All-Big Eight Conference football team
- 1985 All-Big Ten Conference football team
- 1985 All-Pacific-10 Conference football team
- 1985 All-SEC football team
