= 1985 Big Ten Conference football season =

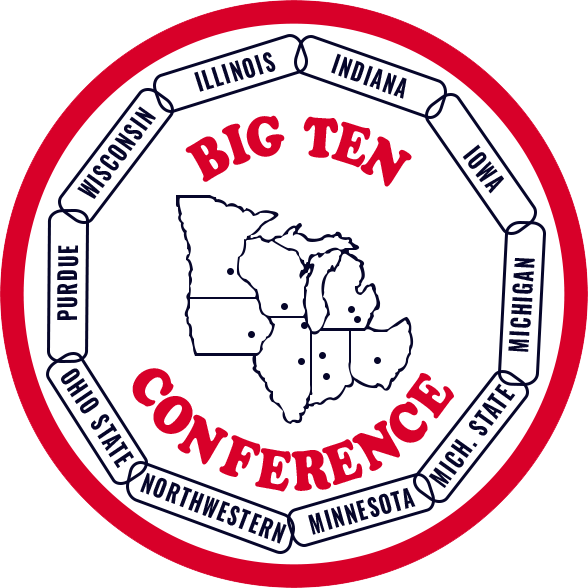
- League: NCAA Division I-A
- Sport: Football
- Teams: 10
- TV partner(s): ABC, CBS, PASS, SportsVision
- Top draft pick: Jim Everett
- Champion: Iowa
- Runners-up: Michigan
- Season MVP: Chuck Long
- Top scorer: Lorenzo White

Football seasons
- ← 1984 1986 →

1985 Big Ten Conference football standings
	Conf.					Overall
Team	W		L		T	W		L		T
No. 10 Iowa $	7	–	1	–	0	10	–	2	–	0
No. 2 Michigan	6	–	1	–	1	10	–	1	–	1
Illinois	5	–	2	–	1	6	–	5	–	1
No. 14 Ohio State	5	–	3	–	0	9	–	3	–	0
Michigan State	5	–	3	–	0	7	–	5	–	0
Minnesota	4	–	4	–	0	7	–	5	–	0
Purdue	3	–	5	–	0	5	–	6	–	0
Wisconsin	2	–	6	–	0	5	–	6	–	0
Indiana	1	–	7	–	0	4	–	7	–	0
Northwestern	1	–	7	–	0	3	–	8	–	0
$ – Conference champion; Rankings from AP Poll

The 1985 Big Ten Conference football season was the 90th season of college football played by the member schools of the Big Ten Conference and was a part of the 1985 NCAA Division I-A football season.

The 1985 Big Ten champion was the 1985 Iowa Hawkeyes football team. The Hawkeyes began the season 7-0 and rose to the No. 1 ranking, including a 12–10 win over No. 2 Michigan at Kinnick Stadium, before losing to Ohio State. Iowa entered the Rose Bowl at 10–1 with an outside shot at a national championship, but were upset by UCLA in the 1986 Rose Bowl, 45–28. Iowa quarterback Chuck Long received the Chicago Tribune Silver Football trophy as the conference's most valuable player. Long and linebacker Larry Station were consensus first-team All-Americans.

The 1985 Michigan Wolverines football team finished in second place in the Big Ten, compiled a 10–1–1 record, defeated Nebraska in the 1986 Fiesta Bowl, and was ranked No. 2 in the final AP and Coaches Polls. Quarterback Jim Harbaugh set a school record with 1,976 passing yards, and Jamie Morris rushed for 1,030 yards. Led by consensus first-team All-Americans Mike Hammerstein at defensive tackle and Brad Cochran at cornerback, the defense tallied three shutouts, gave up only 75 points in 11 regular season games (6.8 points per game), and led the nation in scoring defense. Bo Schembechler was selected as Big Ten Coach of the Year.

The 1985 Ohio State Buckeyes football team compiled a 9–3 record, defeated BYU in the 1985 Florida Citrus Bowl, and was ranked No. 11 in the final Coaches Poll. Linebackers Chris Spielman and Pepper Johnson both received first-team All-American honors. Wide receiver Cris Carter had 950 receiving yards and received first-team All-Big Ten honors.

Running back Lorenzo White of Michigan State led the conference in both rushing (2,066 yards) and scoring (102 points) and was a consensus first-team All-American. Wide receiver David Williams of Illinois was also a consensus first-team All-American.

== Season overview ==
=== Results and team statistics ===
Conf. Rank	Team	Head coach	AP final	AP high	Overall record	Conf. record	PPG	PAG	MVP
1	Iowa	Hayden Fry	#10	#1	10–2	7–1	**36.7**	15.6	**Chuck Long**
2	Michigan	Bo Schembechler	#2	#2	10–1–1	6–1–1	28.5	**8.2**	Mike Hammerstein
3	Illinois	Mike White	NR	#11	6–5–1	5–2–1	25.3	27.8	David Williams
4	Ohio State	Earle Bruce	#14	#3	9–3	5–3	27.1	17.7	Jim Karsatos
5	Michigan State	George Perles	NR	NR	7–5	5–3	21.5	18.3	Lorenzo White
6	Minnesota	Lou Holtz	NR	#20	7–5	4–4	24.4	20.0	Rickey Foggie
7	Purdue	Leon Burtnett	NR	NR	5–6	3–5	26.1	27.8	Jim Everett
8	Wisconsin	Dave McClain	NR	NR	5–6	2–6	21.0	23.9	Larry Emery
9	Indiana	Bill Mallory	NR	NR	4–7	1–7	22.8	30.9	Bobby Howard
10	Northwestern	Dennis Green	NR	NR	3–8	1–7	15.5	30.2	

Key
AP final = Team's rank in the final AP Poll of the 1985 season
AP high = Team's highest rank in the AP Poll throughout the 1985 season
PPG = Average of points scored per game; conference leader's average displayed in bold
PAG = Average of points allowed per game; conference leader's average displayed in bold
MVP = Most valuable player as voted by players on each team as part of the voting process to determine the winner of the Chicago Tribune Silver Football trophy; trophy winner in bold

=== Bowl games ===
Six Big Ten teams played in bowl games:

- **Iowa** lost to UCLA, 45–28, in the 1986 Rose Bowl in Pasadena, California.
- **Michigan** defeated Nebraska, 27–23, in the 1986 Fiesta Bowl in Tempe, Arizona.
- **Michigan State** lost to Georgia Tech, 17–14, in the 1985 Hall of Fame Classic in Birmingham, Alabama.
- **Illinois** lost to Army, 31–29, in the 1985 Peach Bowl in Atlanta, Georgia.
- **Ohio State** defeated BYU, 10–7, in the 1985 Florida Citrus Bowl in Orlando, Florida.
- **Minnesota** defeated Clemson, 20–13, in the 1985 Independence Bowl, in Shreveport, Louisiana.

== Statistical leaders ==
The Big Ten's individual statistical leaders include the following:

=== Passing yards ===
1. Jim Everett, Purdue (3,651)
2. Chuck Long, Iowa (2,978)
3. Jack Trudeau, Illinois (2,938)
4. Jim Karsatos, Ohio State (2,311)
5. Mike Greenfield, Northwestern (2,152)

=== Rushing yards ===
1. Lorenzo White, Michigan State (2,066)
2. Larry Emery, Wisconsin (1,113)
3. Ronnie Harmon, Iowa (1,111)
4. Jamie Morris, Michigan (1,030)
5. Bobby Howard, Indiana (967)

=== Receiving yards ===
1. Rodney Carter, Purdue (1,099)
2. David Williams, Illinois (1,047)
3. Cris Carter, Ohio State (950)
4. Kenny Allen, Indiana (929)
5. Bill Happel, Iowa (812)

=== Total offense ===
1. Jim Everett, Purdue (3,589)
2. Jack Trudeau, Illinois (2,914)
3. Chuck Long, Iowa (2,887)
4. Jim Karsatos, Ohio State (2,350)
5. Mike Greenfield, Northwestern (2,222)

=== Passing efficiency rating ===
1. Jim Harbaugh, Michigan (157.9)
2. Chuck Long, Iowa (153.0)
3. Jim Karsatos, Ohio State (144.6)
4. Jim Everett, Purdue (143.5)
5. Jack Trudeau, Illinois (123.4)

=== Rushing yards per attempt ===
1. Joe Armentrout, Wisconsin (6.4)
2. Valdez Baylor, Minnesota (5.9)
3. Thomas Rooks, Illinois (5.4)
4. Ronnie Harmon, Iowa (5.3)
5. Jamie Morris, Michigan (5.2)

=== Yards per reception ===
1. Mark Ingram Sr., Michigan State (21.9)
2. Tim Fullington, Wisconsin (19.2)
3. Paul Jokisch, Michigan (18.4)
4. Mike Lanese, Ohio State (17.8)
5. Mark Jackson, Purdue (17.0)

=== Points scored ===
1. Lorenzo White, Michigan State (102)
2. Rob Houghtlin, Iowa (97)
3. Mike Gillette, Michigan (78)
4. Rich Spangler, Ohio State (77)
5. Chris White, Illinois (73)

== Awards and honors ==
=== All-conference players ===
The following players were picked by the Associated Press (AP) and/or the United Press International (UPI) as first-team players on the 1985 All-Big Ten Conference football team.

Offense

Position	Name	Team	Selectors
Quarterback	Chuck Long	Iowa	AP, UPI
Running back	Lorenzo White	Michigan State	AP, UPI
Running back	Ronnie Harmon	Iowa	AP, UPI
Running back	Rodney Carter	Purdue	UPI
Center	Bob Maggs	Ohio State	AP, UPI
Guard	Jim Juriga	Illinois	AP, UPI
Guard	John Wojciechowski	Michigan State	AP
Guard	Bob Landsee	Wisconsin	UPI
Tackle	Mike Haight	Iowa	AP, UPI
Tackle	Clay Miller	Michigan	AP
Tackle	Rory Graves	Ohio State	UPI
Tight end	Eric Kattus	Michigan	AP
Receiver	David Williams	Illinois	AP, UPI
Receiver	Cris Carter	Ohio State	AP, UPI

Defense

Position	Name	Team	Selectors
Defensive line	Jeff Drost	Iowa	AP, UPI
Defensive line	Mike Hammerstein	Michigan	AP, UPI
Defensive line	Hap Peterson	Iowa	AP, UPI
Defensive line	Mark Messner	Michigan	AP
Defensive line	Guy Teafatiler	Illinois	UPI
Linebacker	Pepper Johnson	Ohio State	AP, UPI
Linebacker	Mike Mallory	Michigan	AP, UPI
Linebacker	Chris Spielman	Ohio State	AP, UPI
Linebacker	Larry Station	Iowa	AP, UPI
Defensive back	Brad Cochran	Michigan	AP, UPI
Defensive back	Rod Woodson	Purdue	AP, UPI
Defensive back	Jay Norvell	Iowa	AP
Defensive back	Phil Parker	Michigan State	UPI

Special teams

Position	Name	Team	Selectors
Placekicker	Rob Houghtlin	Iowa	AP
Placekicker	Chris White	Illinois	UPI
Punter	Greg Montgomery	Michigan State	AP
Punter	Tom Tupa	Ohio State	UPI

=== All-Americans ===
At the end of the season, five Big Ten players were consensus first-team picks for the 1985 College Football All-America Team. The Big Ten's consensus All-Americans were:

Position	Name	Team	Selectors
Quarterback	Chuck Long	Iowa	AFCA, AP, FWAA, UPI, WCFF, GNS, NEA, SH, TSN
Running back	Lorenzo White	Michigan State	AFCA, AP, FWAA, UPI, WCFF, GNS, NEA, SH, TSN
Wide receiver	David Williams	Illinois	AFCA, AP, FWAA, UPI, WCFF, NEA, SH, TSN
Linebacker	Larry Station	Iowa	AFCA, AP, FWAA, UPI, WCFF, NEA, SH
Defensive tackle	Mike Hammerstein	Michigan	AFCA, AP, UPI, GNS, NEA, SH
Defensive back	Brad Cochran	Michigan	AFCA, FWAA, UPI, WCFF, SH

Other Big Ten players who were named first-team All-Americans by at least one selector were:

Position	Name	Team	Selectors
Linebacker	Pepper Johnson	Ohio State	UPI
Linebacker	Chris Spielman	Ohio State	NEA
Defensive back	Rod Woodson	Purdue	NEA

=== Other awards ===
Three Big Ten players finished among the top six in voting for the Heisman Trophy: Iowa quarterback Chuck Long (second, trailing Bo Jackson by one percent); Michigan State running back Lorenzo White (fourth); and Purdue quarterback Jim Everett (sixth).

Chuck Long and Lorenzo White tied for the Big Ten Player of the Year award. Long received the Chicago Tribune Silver Football award.

Bo Schembechler of Michigan received the Big Ten Coach of the Year award.

== 1986 NFL draft ==
The 1986 NFL draft was held April 29–30, 1986. The following Big Ten players were selected in the first round of the draft:

Name	Position	Team	Round	Overall pick
Jim Everett	Quarterback	Purdue	1	3
Anthony Bell	Linebacker	Michigan State	1	5
Keith Byars	Fullback	Ohio State	1	10
Chuck Long	Quarterback	Iowa	1	12
Ronnie Harmon	Running Back	Iowa	1	16
Mike Haight	Offensive Tackle	Iowa	1	22
