= 1985 Ohio State Buckeyes football team =

American college football season

1985 Ohio State Buckeyes football

Florida Citrus Bowl champion

Florida Citrus Bowl, W 10–7 vs. BYU
- Conference: Big Ten Conference

Ranking
- Coaches: No. 11
- AP: No. 14
- Record: 9–3 (5–3 Big Ten)
- Head coach: Earle Bruce (7th season)
- Offensive coordinator: Glen Mason (6th season)
- Defensive coordinator: Gary Blackney (1st season)
- MVP: Jim Karsatos
- Captains: Keith Byars; Mike Lanese; Pepper Johnson
- Home stadium: Ohio Stadium

1985 Big Ten Conference football standings
	Conf.					Overall
Team	W		L		T	W		L		T
No. 10 Iowa $	7	–	1	–	0	10	–	2	–	0
No. 2 Michigan	6	–	1	–	1	10	–	1	–	1
Illinois	5	–	2	–	1	6	–	5	–	1
No. 14 Ohio State	5	–	3	–	0	9	–	3	–	0
Michigan State	5	–	3	–	0	7	–	5	–	0
Minnesota	4	–	4	–	0	7	–	5	–	0
Purdue	3	–	5	–	0	5	–	6	–	0
Wisconsin	2	–	6	–	0	5	–	6	–	0
Indiana	1	–	7	–	0	4	–	7	–	0
Northwestern	1	–	7	–	0	3	–	8	–	0
$ – Conference champion; Rankings from AP Poll

The 1985 Ohio State Buckeyes football team was an American football team that represented the Ohio State University as a member of the Big Ten Conference during the 1985 Big Ten season. In their seventh year under head coach Earle Bruce, the Buckeyes compiled a 9–3 record (5–3 in conference games), tied for fourth place in the Big Ten, and outscored opponents by a total of 315 to 205. Against ranked opponents, they defeated No. 1 Iowa, lost to No. 6 Michigan, and defeated No. 9 BYU in the 1985 Florida Citrus Bowl. The Buckeyes were ranked No. 14 in the final AP poll.

The Buckeyes gained an average of 163.8 rushing yards and 184.1 passing yards per game. On defense, they held opponents to 147.2 rushing yards and 180.3 passing yards per game. The team's statistical leaders included quarterback Jim Karsatos (2,115 passing yards, 62.2% completion percentage), running back John Wooldridge (728 rushing yards, 4.9 yards per carry), and wide receiver Cris Carter (53 receptions for 879 yards). Linebackers Pepper Johnson and Chris Spielman received first-team All-America honors from the UPI and NEA, respectively. Six received first-team honors on the 1985 All-Big Ten Conference football team: Johnson (AP/UPI); Spielman (AP/UPI); Carter (AP/UPI); center Bob Maggs (AP/UPI); offensive tackle Rory Graves (UPI); and punter Tom Tupa (UPI).

The team played its home games at Ohio Stadium in Columbus, Ohio.

== Schedule ==
Date	Time	Opponent	Rank	Site	TV	Result	Attendance	Source
September 14	8:00 p.m.	Pittsburgh*	No. 9	Ohio Stadium; Columbus, OH	WTBS	W 10–7	88,518	
September 21	3:30 p.m.	at Colorado*	No. 7	Folsom Field; Boulder, CO		W 36–13	47,022	
September 28	1:30 p.m.	Washington State*	No. 5	Ohio Stadium; Columbus, OH		W 48–32	89,954	
October 5	2:00 p.m.	at Illinois	No. 5	Memorial Stadium; Champaign, IL (Illibuck)		L 28–31	76,343	
October 12	1:30 p.m.	Indiana	No. 15	Ohio Stadium; Columbus, OH		W 48–7	89,846	
October 19	12:00 p.m.	Purdue	No. 11	Ohio Stadium; Columbus, OH	CBS	W 41–27	89,888	
October 26	3:30 p.m.	at No. 20 Minnesota	No. 9	Hubert H. Humphrey Metrodome; Minneapolis, MN	CBS	W 23–19	64,455	
November 2	2:30 p.m.	No. 1 Iowa	No. 8	Ohio Stadium; Columbus, OH	CBS	W 22–13	90,467	
November 9	12:30 p.m.	at Northwestern	No. 4	Dyche Stadium; Evanston, IL	WTBS	W 35–17	26,477	
November 16	1:30 p.m.	Wisconsin	No. 3	Ohio Stadium; Columbus, OH		L 7–12	89,873	
November 23	1:30 p.m.	at No. 6 Michigan	No. 12	Michigan Stadium; Ann Arbor, MI (rivalry)	CBS	L 17–27	106,102	
December 28	1:00 p.m.	vs. No. 9 BYU*	No. 17	Florida Citrus Bowl; Orlando, FL (Florida Citrus Bowl)	NBC	W 10–7	50,920	
*Non-conference game; Rankings from AP Poll released prior to the game; All times are in Eastern time

== Game summaries ==
=== Pittsburgh ===
Team	1	2	3	4	Total
Pittsburgh	0	0	0	7	7
• Ohio St	0	3	0	7	10

- Date: September 14
- Location: Ohio Stadium

=== Colorado ===
Team	1	2	3	4	Total
• Ohio St	7	15	0	14	36
Colorado	7	0	0	6	13

- Date: September 21
- Location: Folsom Field

=== Washington State ===
Team	1	2	3	4	Total
Washington St	14	3	3	12	32
• Ohio St	7	28	3	10	48

- Date: September 28
- Location: Ohio Stadium

=== Illinois ===
Team	1	2	3	4	Total
Ohio St	0	14	14	0	28
• Illinois	14	0	7	10	31

- Date: October 5
- Location: Memorial Stadium

=== Indiana ===
Team	1	2	3	4	Total
Indiana	0	7	0	0	7
• Ohio St	7	28	10	3	48

- Date: October 12
- Location: Ohio Stadium

=== Purdue ===
Purdue Boilermakers (3–2) at #11 Ohio State Buckeyes (4–1)

Quarter	1	2	3	4	Total
Purdue	0	10	10	7	27
Ohio St	14	3	7	17	41

at Ohio Stadium, Columbus, Ohio

- Date: October 19, 1985
- Game time: 12:00 p.m. EDT
- Game weather: Overcast, 75 °F (24 °C)
- Game attendance: 89,888
- Referee: Otho Kortz
- TV: CBS
- Box Score

Game information

First quarter

- OSU – George Cooper 4-yard pass from Jim Karsatos (Rich Spangler kick), 8:14. Ohio St 7–0. Drive: 9 plays, 39 yards, 4:31.
- OSU – Mike Lanese 12-yard pass from Jim Karsatos (Rich Spangler kick), 3:11. Ohio St 14–0. Drive: 7 plays, 64 yards, 2:56.

Second quarter

- OSU – Rich Spangler 39-yard field goal, 13:32. Ohio St 17–0. Drive: 8 plays, 53 yards, 2:40.
- PUR – Rodney Carter 15-yard pass from Jim Everett (Jonathan Briggs kick), 3:02. Ohio St 17–7. Drive: 11 plays, 95 yards, 3:42.
- PUR – Jonathan Briggs 22-yard field goal, 0:01. Ohio St 17–10. Drive: 13 plays, 75 yards, 1:54.

Third quarter

- OSU – Cris Carter 4-yard pass from Jim Karsatos (Rich Spangler kick), 9:37. Ohio St 24–10. Drive: 9 plays, 32 yards, 4:34.
- PUR – Ray Wallace 8-yard pass from Jim Everett (Jonathan Briggs kick), 8:12. Ohio St 24–17. Drive: 4 plays, 80 yards, 1:21.
- PUR – Jonathan Briggs 21-yard field goal, 2:25. Ohio St 24–20. Drive: 14 plays, 45 yards, 4:36.

Fourth quarter

- OSU – Rich Spangler 30-yard field goal, 12:46. Ohio St 27–20. Drive: 11 plays, 67 yards, 4:39.
- PUR – James Medlock 2-yard run (Jonathan Briggs kick), 8:35. Tie 27–27. Drive: 9 plays, 80 yards, 4:11.
- OSU – Keith Byars 1-yard run (Rich Spangler kick), 4:41. Ohio St 34–27. Drive: 9 plays, 55 yards, 3:50.
- OSU – Keith Byars 9-yard run (Rich Spangler kick), 2:10. Ohio St 41–27. Drive: 5 plays, 48 yards, 2:02.

Top passers

- PUR – Jim Everett – 35/55, 497 yards, 2 TD, 2 INT
- OSU – Jim Karsatos – 14/26, 174 yards, 3 TD

Top rushers

- PUR – Ray Wallace – 3 rushes, 35 yards
- OSU – Keith Byars – 23 rushes, 106 yards, 2 TD

Top receivers

- PUR – Rodney Carter – 15 receptions, 190 yards, TD
- OSU – Cris Carter – 4 receptions, 96 yards, TD

External videos
- Game highlights

=== at No. 20 Minnesota ===
#9 Ohio State Buckeyes (5–1) at #20 Minnesota Golden Gophers (5–1)

Quarter	1	2	3	4	Total
Ohio St	0	10	0	13	23
Minnesota	3	9	7	0	19

at Hubert H. Humphrey Metrodome, Minneapolis, Minnesota

- Date: October 26, 1985
- Game time: 2:30 p.m.
- Game weather: Indoors (dome)
- Game attendance: 64,455
- Referee: Jim Kemmerling
- Box Score

Game information

First quarter

- MINN – Chip Lohmiller 36-yard field goal, 8:34. Minnesota 3–0. Drive: 10 plays, 52 yards, 4:51.

Second quarter

- MINN – Chip Lohmiller 50-yard field goal, 14:56. Minnesota 6–0. Drive: 10 plays, 50 yards, 5:41.
- OSU – Keith Byars 2-yard run (Rich Spangler kick), 9:37. Ohio St 7–6. Drive: 10 plays, 80 yards, 5:19.
- OSU – Rich Spangler 38-yard field goal, 4:26. Ohio St 10–6. Drive: 9 plays, 34 yards, 4:16.
- MINN – Ricky Foggie 7-yard run (run failed), 0:05. Minnesota 12–10. Drive: 11 plays, 66 yards, 4:15.

Third quarter

- MINN – Ricky Foggie 1-yard run (Chip Lohmiller kick), 6:15. Minnesota 19–10. Drive: 18 plays, 88 yards, 8:45.

Fourth quarter

- OSU – Ed Taggart 1-yard pass from Jim Karsatos (Rich Spangler kick), 14:31. Minnesota 19–17. Drive: 16 plays, 90 yards, 6:44.
- OSU – Vince Workman 16-yard run (pass failed), 10:36. Ohio St 23–19. Drive: 7 plays, 53 yards, 2:55.

Top passers

- OSU – Jim Karsatos – 11/17, 115 yards, TD, INT
- MINN – Ricky Foggie – 14/20, 147 yards, INT

Top rushers

- OSU – Keith Byars – 18 rushes, 67 yards, TD
- MINN – Ricky Foggie – 18 rushes, 57 yards, 2 TD

Top receivers

- OSU – Mike Lanese – 2 receptions, 36 yards
- MINN – Melvin Anderson – 7 receptions, 74 yards

=== No. 1 Iowa ===
Team	1	2	3	4	Total
No. 1 Hawkeyes	0	7	0	6	13
• No. 8 Buckeyes	5	10	0	7	22

- Date: November 2
- Location: Ohio Stadium, Columbus, Ohio
- TV announcers (CBS): Brent Musburger

Scoring summary
1	11:03	OSU	Rich Spangler 28-yard field goal	OSU 3-0
1	0:02	OSU	Safety, Sonny Gordan blocked punt out of end zone	OSU 5-0
2	9:06	OSU	John Woolridge 57-yard run (Spangler kick)	OSU 12-0
2	5:00	OSU	Rich Spangler 26-yard field goal	OSU 15-0
2	0:28	Iowa	Ronnie Harmon 3-yard run (Rob Houghtlin kick)	OSU 15-7
4	11:39	OSU	Vince Workman 4-yard run (Spangler kick)	OSU 22-7
4	8:19	Iowa	David Hudson 2-yard run (Kevin Harmon run failed)	OSU 22-13

	Iowa	Ohio St
First downs	21	16
Rushing yards	186	233
Passing	17–34–4	10–17–2
Passing yards	169	151
Total Offense	345	370
Fumbles Lost	2–1	1–0
Punts-Average	4–32.5	4–45.3
Penalties	3–16	7–57

Team	Category	Player	Statistics
Iowa	Passing	Chuck Long	19–26, 169 yards, 4 INT
Iowa	Rushing	Ronnie Harmon	26 carries, 120 yards, TD
Iowa	Receiving	Ronnie Harmon	5 receptions, 19 yards
Ohio State	Passing	Jim Karsatos	10–17, 151 yards, 2 INT
Ohio State	Rushing	George Cooper	17 carries, 104 yards
Ohio State	Receiving	Cris Carter	3 receptions, 65 yards

=== Northwestern ===
Team	1	2	3	4	Total
• Ohio St	14	14	7	0	35
Northwestern	0	0	7	10	17

- Date: November 9
- Location: Dyche Stadium

=== Wisconsin ===
Team	1	2	3	4	Total
• Wisconsin	3	3	6	0	12
Ohio St	0	7	0	0	7

- Date: November 16
- Location: Ohio Stadium

=== at No. 6 Michigan ===
#12 Ohio State Buckeyes at #6 Michigan Wolverines

Quarter	1	2	3	4	Total
Ohio State	0	10	0	7	17
Michigan	3	7	10	7	27

at Michigan Stadium, Ann Arbor, Michigan

- Date: November 23
- Game weather: Overcast, 40 °F (4 °C)
- Game attendance: 106,102
- TV: CBS
- Box Score

Game information

First quarter

- MICH – Pat Moons 34-yard field goal, 1:59. Michigan 3–0. Drive: 7 plays, 21 yards.

Second quarter

- OSU – Rich Spangler 48-yard field goal, 11:40. Tie 3–3. Drive: 11 plays, 49 yards.
- OSU – Keith Byars 2-yard run (Rich Spangler kick), 8:41. Ohio St 10–3. Drive: 5 plays, 19 yards.
- MICH – Gerald White 4-yard pass from Jim Harbaugh (Pat Moons kick), 2:20. Tie 10–10. Drive: 12 plays, 80 yards.

Third quarter

- MICH – Pat Moons 38-yard field goal, 10:28. Michigan 13–10. Drive: 11 plays, 55 yards.
- MICH – Eric Kattus 5-yard pass from Jim Harbaugh (Pat Moons kick), 2:56. Michigan 20–10. Drive: 12 plays, 63 yards.

Fourth quarter

- OSU – Cris Carter 36-yard pass from Jim Karsatos (Rich Spangler kick), 10:10. Michigan 20–17. Drive: 9 plays, 80 yards.
- MICH – John Kolesar 77-yard pass from Jim Harbaugh (Pat Moons kick), 9:19. Michigan 27–17. Drive: 2 plays, 80 yards.

Top passers

- OSU – Jim Karsatos – 17/31, 179 yards, TD, INT
- MICH – Jim Harbaugh – 16/19, 230 yards, 3 TD

Top rushers

- OSU – Keith Byars – 12 rushes, 35 yards, TD
- MICH – Gerald White – 29 rushes, 110 yards

Top receivers

- OSU – Cris Carter – 5 receptions, 90 yards, TD
- MICH – John Kolesar – 4 receptions, 109 yards

=== vs No. 9 BYU (Citrus Bowl) ===
Team	1	2	3	4	Total
• No. 17 Buckeyes	0	3	7	0	10
No. 9 Cougars	0	7	0	0	7

- Date: December 28
- Location: Citrus Bowl

== Personnel ==
=== Roster ===
1985 Ohio State Buckeyes football team roster
Players
Coaches
Offense

Pos.	#	Name	Class

Defense

Pos.	#	Name	Class
DB		Sean Bell
DL		Henry Brown
DB	7	Sonny Gordon
DB		Steve Hill
DL		Ray Holliman
LB		Pepper Johnson	Sr
LB		Larry Kolic
LB		Eric Kumerow
LB		Scott Leach
LB		Byron Lee
DL	95	Daryll Lee
DL		Fred Ridder
DB	29	Greg Rogan
LB	36	Chris Spielman	So
DB	12	Terry White
DB		William White

Special teams

Pos.	#	Name	Class
K	10	Rich Spangler
P, QB	19	Tom Tupa	So

Head coach

- Earle Bruce

Coordinators/assistant coaches

- Gary Blackney (DC)
- Bill Conley (ILB)
- Steve Devine (OL)
- Randy Hart (DL)
- Chuck Heater (DB)
- Glen Mason (OC)
- Fred Pagac (LB)
- Jim Tressel (QB)
- Leonard Willis

Legend

- (C) Team captain
- (S) Suspended
- (I) Ineligible
- Injured
- Redshirt

=== Depth chart ===
Defense

FS
12 Terry White
20 Dwight Smith

OLB	ILB	ILB	SLB
14 Eric Kumerow	36 Chris Spielman	98 Pepper Johnson	82 Byron Lee
57 John Sullivan	61 Derek Isaman	30 Mike Kee	8 Scott Leach

ROV
8 Sonny Gordon
24 Mike Wood

CB
37 William White
47 Ray Jackson

DE	NT	DE
90 Fred Ridder	33 Larry Kolic (LB/NG)	95 Darryl Lee
55 Ray Holliman	67 Mike Sullivan	94 Henry Brown

CB
29 Greg Rogan
11 Steve Hill

Offense

SE
2 Cris Carter
49 Doug Smith

LT	LG	C	RG	RT
75 Rory Graves	97 Jeff Uhlenhake	71 Bob Maggs	56 Jim Gilmore	72 Larry Kotterman
77 Ron Paulsen	65 Tom Glancey	50 Tim Odom	51 Greg Zackeroff	69 Jay Shaffer

TE
80 Ed Taggart
81 John Hutchison

FL
1 Mike Lanese
26 Nate Harris

QB
16 Jim Karsatos
19 Tom Tupa

Key reserves
41 Keith Byars (foot injury)

FB
44 George Cooper
43 Barry Walker

Special teams
PK 10 Rich Spangler
P 19 Tom Tupa

RB
25 John Wooldridge
42 Vince Workman

== Awards and honors ==
- Pepper Johnson, UPI First Team All-America, Football News First Team All-America

== 1986 NFL draftees ==
Player	Round	Pick	Position	NFL club
Keith Byars	1	10	Running back	Philadelphia Eagles
Pepper Johnson	2	51	Linebacker	New York Giants
Byron Lee	7	176	Linebacker	Philadelphia Eagles
Larry Kolic	7	193	Linebacker	Miami Dolphins
