= 1985 Purdue Boilermakers football team =

American college football season

1985 Purdue Boilermakers football
- Conference: Big Ten Conference
- Record: 5–6 (3–5 Big Ten)
- Head coach: Leon Burtnett (4th season)
- Offensive coordinator: Bob Spoo (1st season)
- Defensive coordinator: Joe Tiller (3rd season)
- MVP: Jim Everett
- Captains: Jim Everett; Bob Ziltz
- Home stadium: Ross–Ade Stadium

1985 Big Ten Conference football standings
	Conf.					Overall
Team	W		L		T	W		L		T
No. 10 Iowa $	7	–	1	–	0	10	–	2	–	0
No. 2 Michigan	6	–	1	–	1	10	–	1	–	1
Illinois	5	–	2	–	1	6	–	5	–	1
No. 14 Ohio State	5	–	3	–	0	9	–	3	–	0
Michigan State	5	–	3	–	0	7	–	5	–	0
Minnesota	4	–	4	–	0	7	–	5	–	0
Purdue	3	–	5	–	0	5	–	6	–	0
Wisconsin	2	–	6	–	0	5	–	6	–	0
Indiana	1	–	7	–	0	4	–	7	–	0
Northwestern	1	–	7	–	0	3	–	8	–	0
$ – Conference champion; Rankings from AP Poll

The 1985 Purdue Boilermakers football team represented the Purdue University in the 1985 Big Ten Conference football season. Led by fourth-year head coach Leon Burtnett, the Boilermakers compiled an overall record of 5–6 with a mark of 3–5 in conference play, placing seventh in the Big Ten. Purdue played home games at Ross–Ade Stadium in West Lafayette, Indiana.

Quarterback Jim Everett led the nation in total offense with 3,589 yards, which was also a program record, since broken by Drew Brees. Everett finished sixth in balloting for the Heisman Trophy.

== Schedule ==
Date	Time	Opponent	Site	TV	Result	Attendance	Source
August 31	7:30 pm	at Pittsburgh*	Pitt Stadium; Pittsburgh, PA	ESPN	L 30–31	50,103	
September 21	2:00 pm	Ball State*	Ross–Ade Stadium; West Lafayette, IN		W 37–18	63,162	
September 28	12:30 pm	Notre Dame*	Ross–Ade Stadium; West Lafayette, IN (rivalry)	TBS	W 35–17	69,338	
October 5	8:00 pm	at Minnesota	Hubert H. Humphrey Metrodome; Minneapolis, MN	TBS	L 15–45	59,503	
October 12	2:30 pm	Illinois	Ross–Ade Stadium; West Lafayette, IN (rivalry)		W 30–24	68,837	
October 19	12:00 pm	at No. 11 Ohio State	Ohio Stadium; Columbus, OH	CBS	L 27–41	89,888	
October 26	12:30 pm	Michigan State^{†}	Ross–Ade Stadium; West Lafayette, IN	TBS	L 24–28	67,660	
November 2	2:00 pm	Northwestern	Ross–Ade Stadium; West Lafayette, IN		W 31–7	53,640	
November 9	1:00 pm	at No. 9 Michigan	Michigan Stadium; Ann Arbor, MI		L 0–47	105,503	
November 16	2:30 pm	No. 5 Iowa	Ross–Ade Stadium; West Lafayette, IN	CBS	L 24–27	57,762	
November 23	2:00 pm	at Indiana	Memorial Stadium; Bloomington, IN (Old Oaken Bucket)		W 34–21	51,752	
*Non-conference game; ^{†}Homecoming; Rankings from AP Poll released prior to the game; All times are in Eastern time

== Game summaries ==
=== At Pittsburgh ===
Purdue Boilermakers (0–0) at Pittsburgh Panthers (0–0)

Quarter	1	2	3	4	Total
Purdue	10	0	14	6	30
Pittsburgh	7	14	0	10	31

at Pitt Stadium, Pittsburgh, Pennsylvania

- Date: August 31, 1985
- Game time: 7:30 p.m. EDT
- Game weather: Clear, 60 °F (16 °C)
- Game attendance: 50,103
- TV announcers (ESPN): Jim Simpson and Paul Maguire

Game information

First quarter

- PUR – Jonathan Briggs 21-yard field goal. Purdue 3–0.
- PITT – Charles Gladman 5-yard run (Mark Brasco kick). Pittsburgh 7–3.
- PUR – Jim Everett 6-yard run (Jonathan Briggs kick). Purdue 10–7.

Second quarter

- PITT – Charles Scales 19-yard pass from John Congemi (Mark Brasco kick). Pittsburgh 14–10.
- PITT – Clint Wilson 5-yard pass from John Congemi (Mark Brasco kick). Pittsburgh 21–10.

Third quarter

- PUR – Steve Griffin 13-yard pass from Jim Everett (pass failed). Pittsburgh 21–16.
- PUR – Ray Wallace 10-yard pass from Jim Everett (pass good). Purdue 24–21.

Fourth quarter

- PITT – Charles Gladman 10-yard run (Mark Brasco kick). Pittsburgh 28–24.
- PITT – Mark Brasco 43-yard field goal. Pittsburgh 31–24.
- PUR – Ray Wallace 31-yard pass from Jim Everett (pass failed), 0:48. Pittsburgh 31–30.

Top passers

- PUR – Jim Everett – 34/53, 398 yards, 3 TD, 2 INT
- PITT – John Congemi – 10/19, 110 yards, 2 TD, INT

Top rushers

- PUR – Ray Wallace – 12 rushes, 59 yards
- PITT – Charles Gladman – 24 rushes, 163 yards, 2 TD

Top receivers

- PUR – Steve Griffin – 7 receptions, 102 yards, TD
- PITT – Charles Scales – 3 receptions, 48 yards, TD

External videos
- Television broadcast with Pittsburgh radio audio
- Final Purdue touchdown and two-point conversion attempt

=== Ball State ===
- Jim Everett 24/32, 340 yards

=== Notre Dame ===
- Jim Everett 27/49, 368 yards

=== Illinois ===
- Jim Everett 27/47, 464 yards

=== At Ohio State ===
Purdue Boilermakers (3–2) at #11 Ohio State Buckeyes (4–1)

Quarter	1	2	3	4	Total
Purdue	0	10	10	7	27
Ohio St	14	3	7	17	41

at Ohio Stadium, Columbus, Ohio

- Date: October 19, 1985
- Game time: 12:00 p.m. EDT
- Game weather: Overcast, 75 °F (24 °C)
- Game attendance: 89,888
- Referee: Otho Kortz
- TV: CBS
- Box Score

Game information

First quarter

- OSU – George Cooper 4-yard pass from Jim Karsatos (Rich Spangler kick), 8:14. Ohio St 7–0. Drive: 9 plays, 39 yards, 4:31.
- OSU – Mike Lanese 12-yard pass from Jim Karsatos (Rich Spangler kick), 3:11. Ohio St 14–0. Drive: 7 plays, 64 yards, 2:56.

Second quarter

- OSU – Rich Spangler 39-yard field goal, 13:32. Ohio St 17–0. Drive: 8 plays, 53 yards, 2:40.
- PUR – Rodney Carter 15-yard pass from Jim Everett (Jonathan Briggs kick), 3:02. Ohio St 17–7. Drive: 11 plays, 95 yards, 3:42.
- PUR – Jonathan Briggs 22-yard field goal, 0:01. Ohio St 17–10. Drive: 13 plays, 75 yards, 1:54.

Third quarter

- OSU – Cris Carter 4-yard pass from Jim Karsatos (Rich Spangler kick), 9:37. Ohio St 24–10. Drive: 9 plays, 32 yards, 4:34.
- PUR – Ray Wallace 8-yard pass from Jim Everett (Jonathan Briggs kick), 8:12. Ohio St 24–17. Drive: 4 plays, 80 yards, 1:21.
- PUR – Jonathan Briggs 21-yard field goal, 2:25. Ohio St 24–20. Drive: 14 plays, 45 yards, 4:36.

Fourth quarter

- OSU – Rich Spangler 30-yard field goal, 12:46. Ohio St 27–20. Drive: 11 plays, 67 yards, 4:39.
- PUR – James Medlock 2-yard run (Jonathan Briggs kick), 8:35. Tie 27–27. Drive: 9 plays, 80 yards, 4:11.
- OSU – Keith Byars 1-yard run (Rich Spangler kick), 4:41. Ohio St 34–27. Drive: 9 plays, 55 yards, 3:50.
- OSU – Keith Byars 9-yard run (Rich Spangler kick), 2:10. Ohio St 41–27. Drive: 5 plays, 48 yards, 2:02.

Top passers

- PUR – Jim Everett – 35/55, 497 yards, 2 TD, 2 INT
- OSU – Jim Karsatos – 14/26, 174 yards, 3 TD

Top rushers

- PUR – Ray Wallace – 3 rushes, 35 yards
- OSU – Keith Byars – 23 rushes, 106 yards, 2 TD

Top receivers

- PUR – Rodney Carter – 15 receptions, 190 yards, TD
- OSU – Cris Carter – 4 receptions, 96 yards, TD

- Mark Jackson – 6 receptions, 132 yards

External videos
- Game highlights

=== Michigan State ===
- Jim Everett 34/51, 315 yards

=== Northwestern ===
- James Medlock 23 rushes, 129 yards

=== Iowa ===
#5 Iowa at Purdue

Team	1	2	3	4	Total
• Hawkeyes	7	17	0	3	27
Boilermakers	7	10	0	7	24

- Date: November 16
- Location: Ross–Ade Stadium, West Lafayette, Indiana
- Game start: 3:42 p.m. EST
- Elapsed time: 3:17
- Game attendance: 57,762
- Game weather: 46 °F (8 °C), Cloudy, Wind WSW 23 mph (37 km/h)
- Referee: Tom Quinn
- TV announcers (CBS Sports): Brent Musburger, Ara Parseghian, and Pat O'Brien

Scoring summary
1	9:21	Purdue	Griffin 49-yard pass from Jim Everett (Briggs kick)	Purdue 7-0
1	0:08	Iowa	Ronnie Harmon 2-yard run (Rob Houghtlin kick)	Tied 7-7
2	14:02	Iowa	Hudson 1-yard run (Rob Houghtlin kick)	IOWA 14-7
2	9:53	Purdue	Medlock 1-yard run (Briggs kick)	Tied 14-14
2	5:55	Iowa	Hudson 1-yard run (Rob Houghtlin kick)	IOWA 21-14
2	1:30	Purdue	Briggs 37-yard field goal	IOWA 21-17
2	0:02	Iowa	Rob Houghtlin 33-yard field goal	IOWA 24-17
4	6:35	Purdue	Medlock 2-yard run (Briggs kick)	Tied 24-24
4	1:08	Iowa	Rob Houghtlin 25-yard field goal	IOWA 27-24

- Jim Everett 23/32, 315 yards

=== At Indiana ===
Purdue Boilermakers (4–6) at Indiana Hoosiers (4–6)

Quarter	1	2	3	4	Total
Purdue	10	21	0	3	34
Indiana	7	7	7	0	21

at Memorial Stadium, Bloomington, Indiana

- Date: November 23
- Game time: 1:00 p.m. CDT
- Game attendance: 51,752

Game information

First quarter

- PUR – Rodney Carter 6-yard pass from Jim Everett (Jonathan Briggs kick). Purdue 7–0.
- IU – Steve Bradley 1-yard run (Mark Rogers kick). Tie 7–7.
- PUR – Jonathan Briggs 33-yard field goal. Purdue 10–7.

Second quarter

- PUR – Ray Wallace 1-yard run (Jonathan Briggs kick). Purdue 17–7.
- IU – Damon Sweazy 4-yard run (Mark Rogers kick). Purdue 17–14.
- PUR – Rodney Carter 70-yard pass from Jim Everett (Jonathan Briggs kick). Purdue 24–14.
- PUR – Ray Wallace 1-yard run (Jonathan Briggs kick). Purdue 31–14.

Third quarter

- IU – Bobby Howard 1-yard run (Mark Rogers kick). Purdue 31–21.

Fourth quarter

- PUR – Jonathan Briggs 37-yard field goal. Purdue 34–21.

Top passers

- PUR – Jim Everett – 22/39, 293 yards, 2 TD, 2 INT
- IND – Steve Bradley – 10/20, 168 yards, 2 INT

Top rushers

- PUR – Ray Wallace – 19 rushes, 140 yards, 2 TD
- IND – Bobby Howard – 18 rushes, 43 yards, TD

Top receivers

- PUR – Rodney Carter – 9 receptions, 113 yards, 2 TD
- IND – Dave Lilja – 6 receptions, 88 yards

External videos
- Purdue Jim Everett 70-yard TD pass to Rodney Carter (second quarter)

== Roster ==
1985 Purdue Boilermakers football team roster
Players
Coaches
Offense

Pos.	#	Name	Class
WR	1	Roberts Armenteros	Sr
TE	96	Jack Beery	Jr
OL	94	Kieth Brown	So
G	66	Bret Bunnel	Sr
WR	22	Rick Brunner	Sr
WR	24	Rodney Carter	Sr
OT	78	Mike Connors	Jr
G	63	Bruce Crites	Jr
QB	14	Doug Downing	Jr
OL		Mark Drenth
QB	11	Jim Everett	Sr
RB		Walt Foster
RB	21	Tony Grant	So
WR	2	Steve Griffin	Sr
WR	80	Jon Hayes	So
QB	7	Jeff Huber	Sr
WR	36	Mark Jackson	Sr
RB		James Medlock
G	61	Vince Panfil	Sr
RB		Bobby Pruitt
OT	79	Jim Richmond	Jr
TE	85	Brad Schumacher	So
TE	84	Marty Scott	Sr
C	56	Rick Skibinski	Sr
C	73	Pat Snyder	Jr
G	53	Todd Tyrie	Fr
WR	43	Ray Wallace	Sr

Defense

Pos.	#	Name	Class
DT	98	Don Baldwin	Sr
CB	19	Cris Dishman	So
LB	30	Art DuBose	Jr
DB	3	Marc Foster
DT	86	Sean Guy	Jr
DL	99	Kevin Holley	Jr
DL	92	Brad Hornor	Sr
DT	95	Mike Kohler	Fr
CB	18	Jeff Lee	Sr
LB	59	Matt Morgan	Jr
DL	68	Anthony Rose	Jr
LB	48	Fred Strickland	So
LB	44	Kevin Sumlin	Jr
DB		Damon Taylor
LB	90	Tony Vavrech	Fr
LB	49	Tony Visco	So
CB	5	Martial Wallace	Jr
S	9	Mike Weaver	Jr
LB	42	Merkle Williams	Jr
SS	23	Kennedy Wilson	Sr
DT	89	Derek Wimberly	Sr
FS	26	Rod Woodson	Jr
DL	71	Bob Ziltz	Sr

Special teams

Pos.	#	Name	Class
K		Jonathan Briggs
P		Ernie Schramayr

Head coach

- Leon Burtnett

Coordinators/assistant coaches

- Bob Spoo (OC)
- Bill Doba

Legend

- (C) Team captain
- (S) Suspended
- (I) Ineligible
- Injured
- Redshirt

== Awards and honors ==
- Jim Everett, sixth in Heisman Trophy votinh

== 1986 NFL draft ==
Player	Position	Round	Pick	NFL club
Jim Everett	Quarterback	1	3	Houston Oilers
Ray Wallace	Running back	6	145	Houston Oilers
Mark Jackson	Wide receiver	6	161	Denver Broncos
Rodney Carter	Running back	5	146	Pittsburgh Steelers
Mark Drenth	Tackle	11	279	Tampa Bay Buccaneers
Steve Griffin	Wide receiver	12	308	Atlanta Falcons
