= 1985 Indiana Hoosiers football team =

American college football season

1985 Indiana Hoosiers football
- Conference: Big Ten Conference
- Record: 4–7 (1–7 Big Ten)
- Head coach: Bill Mallory (2nd season)
- Defensive coordinator: Joe Novak (2nd season)
- MVP: Bobby Howard
- Captains: Steve Bradley; Rob Schmit
- Home stadium: Memorial Stadium

1985 Big Ten Conference football standings
	Conf.					Overall
Team	W		L		T	W		L		T
No. 10 Iowa $	7	–	1	–	0	10	–	2	–	0
No. 2 Michigan	6	–	1	–	1	10	–	1	–	1
Illinois	5	–	2	–	1	6	–	5	–	1
No. 14 Ohio State	5	–	3	–	0	9	–	3	–	0
Michigan State	5	–	3	–	0	7	–	5	–	0
Minnesota	4	–	4	–	0	7	–	5	–	0
Purdue	3	–	5	–	0	5	–	6	–	0
Wisconsin	2	–	6	–	0	5	–	6	–	0
Indiana	1	–	7	–	0	4	–	7	–	0
Northwestern	1	–	7	–	0	3	–	8	–	0
$ – Conference champion; Rankings from AP Poll

The 1985 Indiana Hoosiers football team represented Indiana University Bloomington during the 1985 Big Ten Conference football season. Led by second-year head coach Bill Mallory, the Hoosiers compiled an overall record of 4–7 with a mark of 1–7 in conference play, tying for ninth place in the Big Ten. The team played home games at Memorial Stadium in Bloomington, Indiana.

== Schedule ==
Date	Time	Opponent	Site	TV	Result	Attendance	Source
September 14		Louisville*	Memorial Stadium; Bloomington, IN		W 41–28	37,626	
September 21		Navy*	Memorial Stadium; Bloomington, IN		W 38–35	35,610	
September 28		at Missouri*	Faurot Field; Columbia, MO		W 36–17	46,763	
October 5		Northwestern	Memorial Stadium; Bloomington, IN		W 26–7	36,905	
October 12		at No. 15 Ohio State	Ohio Stadium; Columbus, OH		L 7–48	89,846	
October 19		Minnesota^{†}	Memorial Stadium; Bloomington, IN		L 7–22	28,331–38,826 (paid)	
October 26	1:00 pm	at No. 4 Michigan	Michigan Stadium; Ann Arbor, MI	PASS	L 15–42	105,629	
November 2		at Wisconsin	Camp Randall Stadium; Madison, WI		L 20–31	78,605	
November 9		Michigan State	Memorial Stadium; Bloomington, IN (rivalry)		L 16–35	24,764	
November 16		at Illinois	Memorial Stadium; Champaign, IL (rivalry)		L 24–41	78,805	
November 23	2:00 pm	Purdue	Memorial Stadium; Bloomington, IN (Old Oaken Bucket)		L 21–34	51,752	
*Non-conference game; ^{†}Homecoming; Rankings from AP Poll released prior to the game; All times are in Eastern time

== Game summaries ==
=== Purdue ===
Purdue Boilermakers (4–6) at Indiana Hoosiers (4–6)

Quarter	1	2	3	4	Total
Purdue	10	21	0	3	34
Indiana	7	7	7	0	21

at Memorial Stadium, Bloomington, Indiana

- Date: November 23
- Game time: 1:00 p.m. CDT
- Game attendance: 51,752

Game information

First quarter

- PUR – Rodney Carter 6-yard pass from Jim Everett (Jonathan Briggs kick). Purdue 7–0.
- IU – Steve Bradley 1-yard run (Mark Rogers kick). Tie 7–7.
- PUR – Jonathan Briggs 33-yard field goal. Purdue 10–7.

Second quarter

- PUR – Ray Wallace 1-yard run (Jonathan Briggs kick). Purdue 17–7.
- IU – Damon Sweazy 4-yard run (Mark Rogers kick). Purdue 17–14.
- PUR – Rodney Carter 70-yard pass from Jim Everett (Jonathan Briggs kick). Purdue 24–14.
- PUR – Ray Wallace 1-yard run (Jonathan Briggs kick). Purdue 31–14.

Third quarter

- IU – Bobby Howard 1-yard run (Mark Rogers kick). Purdue 31–21.

Fourth quarter

- PUR – Jonathan Briggs 37-yard field goal. Purdue 34–21.

Top passers

- PUR – Jim Everett – 22/39, 293 yards, 2 TD, 2 INT
- IND – Steve Bradley – 10/20, 168 yards, 2 INT

Top rushers

- PUR – Ray Wallace – 19 rushes, 140 yards, 2 TD
- IND – Bobby Howard – 18 rushes, 43 yards, TD

Top receivers

- PUR – Rodney Carter – 9 receptions, 113 yards, 2 TD
- IND – Dave Lilja – 6 receptions, 88 yards

== Personnel ==
1985 Indiana Hoosiers football team roster
Players
Coaches
Offense

Pos.	#	Name	Class
WR		Kenny Allen
QB		Steve Bradley
RB		Jim Caldwell
WR		Stacy Dawsey
QB		Brian Dewitz
RB		Bobby Howard
WR		Ernie Jones
TE		Tim Jordan
OL		Dave Kinniry
QB		Dave Kramme
OL		Jeff Lemirande
TE		Dave Lilja
OL		Eric Moore
RB		Tom Polce
OL		Tim Radtke
OL		Bob Riley
OL		Don Schrader
RB		Damon Sweazy
RB		Spud Washington

Defense

Pos.	#	Name	Class
LB		Willie Bates
DL		Dan Bauer
DB		Leonard Bell
DB		Erick Coleman
DB		Efren Edwards
DL		Vince Fisher
LB		Joe Ford
DB		Alex Green
LB		Tom Houts
LB		Steve May
DL		Mike McCurry
LB		Brad Mitchell
LB		Brad Money
DL		Rob Schmit
DB		Rob VanVliet
DB		Jeff Wade
LB		Van Waiters
DL		Tom Weidenbenner

Special teams

Pos.	#	Name	Class
K		Mark Rogers
K		Pete Stoyanovich
P		Dan Stryzinski

Head coach

- Bill Mallory

Coordinators/assistant coaches

Legend

- (C) Team captain
- (S) Suspended
- (I) Ineligible
- Injured
- Redshirt

== 1986 NFL draftees ==
Player	Position	Round	Pick	NFL club
Steve Bradley	Quarterback	12	316	Cincinnati Bengals
Bobby Howard	Running back	12	325	Philadelphia Eagles
