= 1985 Illinois Fighting Illini football team =

American college football season

1985 Illinois Fighting Illini football

Peach Bowl, L 29–31 vs. Army
- Conference: Big Ten Conference
- Record: 6–5–1 (5–2–1 Big Ten)
- Head coach: Mike White (6th season)
- MVP: David Williams
- Captains: Jack Trudeau; Craig Swoope; Chris White
- Home stadium: Memorial Stadium

1985 Big Ten Conference football standings
	Conf.					Overall
Team	W		L		T	W		L		T
No. 10 Iowa $	7	–	1	–	0	10	–	2	–	0
No. 2 Michigan	6	–	1	–	1	10	–	1	–	1
Illinois	5	–	2	–	1	6	–	5	–	1
No. 14 Ohio State	5	–	3	–	0	9	–	3	–	0
Michigan State	5	–	3	–	0	7	–	5	–	0
Minnesota	4	–	4	–	0	7	–	5	–	0
Purdue	3	–	5	–	0	5	–	6	–	0
Wisconsin	2	–	6	–	0	5	–	6	–	0
Indiana	1	–	7	–	0	4	–	7	–	0
Northwestern	1	–	7	–	0	3	–	8	–	0
$ – Conference champion; Rankings from AP Poll

The 1985 Illinois Fighting Illini football team was an American football team that represented the University of Illinois at Urbana-Champaign as a member of the Big Ten Conference during the 1985 Big Ten Conference football season. In their sixth year under head coach Mike White, the Fighting Illini compiled a 6–5–1 record (5–2–1 in conference games), finished in third place in the Big Ten, and were outscored by a total of 303 to 275. They concluded the season with a loss to Army in the 1985 Peach Bowl.

The team's statistical leaders included quarterback Jack Trudeau (2,938 passing yards, 63.7% completion percentage), running back Thomas Rooks (718 rushing yards, 5.4 yards per carry), wide receiver David Williams (85 receptions for 1,047 yards), and kicker Chris White (73 points scored, 31 of 31 extra points, 14 of 20 field goals). Four Illinois players received first-team honors on the 1985 All-Big Ten Conference football team: Williams at wide receiver (AP-1, UPI-1); Jim Juriga at guard (AP-1, UPI-1; Guy Teafatiller at defensive line (UPI-1); and White at kicker (UPI-1).

The team played its home games at Memorial Stadium in Champaign, Illinois.

== Schedule ==
Date	Opponent	Rank	Site	Result	Attendance	Source
September 7	No. 6 USC*	No. 11	Memorial Stadium; Champaign, IL	L 10–20	76,369	
September 14	Southern Illinois*	No. 19	Memorial Stadium; Champaign, IL	W 28–25	76,330	
September 21	at No. 18 Nebraska*	No. 20	Memorial Stadium; Lincoln, NE	L 25–52	76,149	
October 5	No. 5 Ohio State		Memorial Stadium; Champaign, IL (Illibuck)	W 31–28	76,343	
October 12	at Purdue		Ross–Ade Stadium; West Lafayette, IN (rivalry)	L 24–30	68,837	
October 19	at Michigan State		Spartan Stadium; East Lansing, MI	W 30–17	76,438	
October 26	Wisconsin		Memorial Stadium; Champaign, IL	W 38–25	76,395	
November 2	No. 4 Michigan		Memorial Stadium; Champaign, IL (rivalry)	T 3–3	76,397	
November 9	at No. 6 Iowa		Kinnick Stadium; Iowa City, IA	L 0–59	66,120	
November 16	Indiana		Memorial Stadium; Champaign, IL (rivalry)	W 41–24	78,805	
November 23	at Northwestern		Dyche Stadium; Evanston, IL (rivalry)	W 45–20	33,054	
December 31	vs. Army*		Atlanta–Fulton County Stadium; Atlanta, GA (Peach Bowl)	L 29–31	29,857	
*Non-conference game; Rankings from AP Poll released prior to the game

== Game summaries ==
=== No. 6 USC ===
USC at Illinois

Team	1	2	3	4	Total
• No. 6 Trojans	14	3	3	0	20
No. 11 Fighting Illini	0	0	7	3	10

- Date: September 7
- Location: Memorial Stadium
- Game attendance: 76,639
- Game weather: 90 °F (32 °C)

Scoring summary
1	USC	Hank Norman 9-yard pass from Sean Salisbury (Don Shafer kick)	USC 7–0
1	USC	Randy Tanner 46-yard pass from Sean Salisbury (Don Shafer kick)	USC 14–0
2	USC	Don Shafer 46-yard field goal	USC 17–0
3	USC	Don Shafer 23-yard field goal	USC 20–0
3	Illinois	Cap Boso 83-yard pass from Jack Trudeau (Chris White kick)	USC 20–7
4	Illinois	Chris White 28-yard field goal	USC 20–10

In a game that some considered a possible Rose Bowl preview, the Illini were doomed by 6 turnovers and found themselves in a 14–0 very early in the game. Illinois pulled to within 20–10 on a Chris White field goal early in the fourth quarter, but USC used ball control to grind out the clock – including 22 minutes of possession in the second half – and gain a big road win in the season opener for both teams.

=== At No. 18 Nebraska ===
Illinois at Nebraska

Team	1	2	3	4	Total
No. 20 Fighting Illini	0	10	0	15	25
• No. 18 Cornhuskers	14	10	21	7	52

- Date: September 21
- Location: Memorial Stadium, Lincoln, Nebraska
- Game attendance: 76,149

=== No. 5 Ohio State ===
Ohio State at Illinois

Team	1	2	3	4	Total
No. 5 Buckeyes	0	14	14	0	28
• Fighting Illini	14	0	7	10	31

- Date: October 5
- Location: Memorial Stadium

=== No. 4 Michigan ===
Team	1	2	3	4	Total
No. 4 Wolverines	0	0	3	0	3
Fighting Illini	0	0	3	0	3

- Date: November 2
- Location: Memorial Stadium, Champaign, IL
- Game attendance: 76,397

On November 2, 1985, Illinois played Michigan to a 3–3 tie at Memorial Stadium. Each team kicked a field goal in the third quarter. In the fourth quarter, Michigan drove the length of the field, but fullback Gerald White fumbled at the Illinois 12-yard line, with the Illini recovering at the nine-yard line. Illinois then drove the length of the field and, with time running out, Chris White lined up for what would have been a game-winning 37-yard field goal. Dieter Heren tipped the ball, which hit the cross-bar and bounced back, and the game ended in a tie. After the game, head coach White said, "I don't remember feeling worse after a game. . . . I'm devastated."

=== At No. 6 Iowa ===
Illinois at Iowa

Team	1	2	3	4	Total
Fighting Illini	0	0	0	0	0
• No. 6 Hawkeyes	35	14	0	10	59

- Date: November 9
- Location:
  Kinnick Stadium,
  Iowa City, Iowa
- Game start: 1:05 p.m. CST
- Elapsed time: 3:20
- Game attendance: 66,120
- Game weather: ~45 °F (7 °C), Cloudy, rain, Wind NE 10–15 mph (16–24 km/h)
- Referee: Otho Kortz

Scoring summary
1	11:54	IOWA	R. Smith 49-yard pass from Chuck Long (Rob Houghtlin kick)	IOWA 7-0
1	10:16	IOWA	Hudson 1-yard run (Houghtlin kick)	IOWA 14-0
1	7:28	IOWA	R. Smith 43-yard pass from Long (Houghtlin kick)	IOWA 21-0
1	4:36	IOWA	Ronnie Harmon 46-yard run (Houghtlin kick)	IOWA 28-0
1	0:59	IOWA	Hudson 10-yard run (Houghtlin kick)	IOWA 35-0
2	5:16	IOWA	Flagg 1-yard pass from Long (Houghtlin kick)	IOWA 42-0
2	2:31	IOWA	Helverson 9-yard pass from Long (Houghtlin kick)	IOWA 49-0
4	13:12	IOWA	Rob Houghtlin 37-yard field goal	IOWA 52-0
4	8:21	IOWA	Goodman 16-yard run (Houghtlin kick)	IOWA 59-0

=== Vs. Army (Peach Bowl) ===
Illinois vs. Army

Team	1	2	3	4	Total
Fighting Illini	3	13	7	6	29
• Cadets	7	14	7	3	31

- Date: December 31
- Location:
  Fulton County Stadium,
  Atlanta, Georgia
- Game attendance: 29,857
- TV announcers (CBS): Gary Bender and Steve Davis
