= 1985 Minnesota Golden Gophers football team =

American college football season

1985 Minnesota Golden Gophers football

Independence Bowl champion

Independence Bowl, W 20–13 vs. Clemson
- Conference: Big Ten Conference
- Record: 7–5 (4–4 Big Ten)
- Head coach: Lou Holtz (2nd season; first 11 games); John Gutekunst (bowl game)
- Defensive coordinator: John Gutekunst (2nd season)
- Captains: Jon Lilleberg; Peter Najarian
- Home stadium: Hubert H. Humphrey Metrodome

1985 Big Ten Conference football standings
	Conf.					Overall
Team	W		L		T	W		L		T
No. 10 Iowa $	7	–	1	–	0	10	–	2	–	0
No. 2 Michigan	6	–	1	–	1	10	–	1	–	1
Illinois	5	–	2	–	1	6	–	5	–	1
No. 14 Ohio State	5	–	3	–	0	9	–	3	–	0
Michigan State	5	–	3	–	0	7	–	5	–	0
Minnesota	4	–	4	–	0	7	–	5	–	0
Purdue	3	–	5	–	0	5	–	6	–	0
Wisconsin	2	–	6	–	0	5	–	6	–	0
Indiana	1	–	7	–	0	4	–	7	–	0
Northwestern	1	–	7	–	0	3	–	8	–	0
$ – Conference champion; Rankings from AP Poll

The 1985 Minnesota Golden Gophers football team represented the University of Minnesota in the 1985 Big Ten Conference football season. In their second and final year under head coach Lou Holtz, the Golden Gophers compiled a 7–5 record and outscored their opponents by a combined total of 293 to 240.

When former Minnesota head coach Lou Holtz left the Golden Gophers to coach at the University of Notre Dame, assistant John Gutekunst was tapped to coach the Golden Gophers in the Independence Bowl. Attendance was 42,845.

Quarterback Rickey Foggie was named offensive player of the game, while linebacker Bruce Holmes was named defensive player of the game. Center Ray Hitchcock, linebacker Peter Najarian, offensive guard Jon Lilleberg and strong safety Larry Joyner were named All-Big Ten second team. Running back David Puk was named Academic All-American second team. Puk and linebacker Peter Najarian were named Academic All-Big Ten.

Quarterback Rickey Foggie was awarded the Bronko Nagurski Award given to the team's most valuable player. Ray Hitchcock was awarded the Bruce Smith Award (offensive player). Peter Najarian was awarded the Carl Eller Award (defensive player). Kicker Chip Lohmiller was awarded the Bobby Bell Award (special teams player). Flanker Andy Hare was awarded the Butch Nash Award (academic). David Puk was awarded the Paul Giel Award (unselfishness and most concern about the University).

The total attendance was 426,918, which averaged out to 60,985 per game. The season high for attendance was against rival Wisconsin.

== Schedule ==
Date	Opponent	Rank	Site	TV	Result	Attendance	Source
September 14	Wichita State*		Hubert H. Humphrey Metrodome; Minneapolis, MN		W 28–14	56,094	
September 21	Montana*		Hubert H. Humphrey Metrodome; Minneapolis, MN		W 62–17	55,700	
September 28	No. 2 Oklahoma*		Hubert H. Humphrey Metrodome; Minneapolis, MN	TBS	L 7–13	62,446	
October 5	Purdue		Hubert H. Humphrey Metrodome; Minneapolis, MN	TBS	W 45–15	59,503	
October 12	at Northwestern		Dyche Stadium; Evanston, IL		W 21–10	24,512	
October 19	at Indiana		Memorial Stadium; Bloomington, IN		W 22–7	28,331–38,826 (paid)	
October 26	No. 9 Ohio State^{†}	No. 20	Hubert H. Humphrey Metrodome; Minneapolis, MN		L 19–23	64,455	
November 2	at Michigan State		Spartan Stadium; East Lansing, MI		L 26–31	63,758	
November 9	Wisconsin		Hubert H. Humphrey Metrodome; Minneapolis, MN (rivalry)		W 27–18	64,571	
November 16	No. 8 Michigan		Hubert H. Humphrey Metrodome; Minneapolis, MN (Little Brown Jug)	TBS	L 7–48	64,129	
November 23	at No. 3 Iowa		Kinnick Stadium; Iowa City, IA (rivalry)		L 9–31	66,020	
December 21	vs. Clemson*		Independence Stadium; Shreveport, LA (Independence Bowl)		W 20–13	42,800	
*Non-conference game; ^{†}Homecoming; Rankings from AP Poll released prior to the game

== Game summaries ==
=== Oklahoma ===
#2 Oklahoma Sooners at Minnesota Golden Gophers

Quarter	1	2	3	4	Total
Oklahoma	3	7	0	3	13
Minnesota	0	0	0	7	7

at Hubert H. Humphrey Metrodome, Minneapolis, Minnesota

- Date: September 28, 1985
- Game weather: Indoors (dome)

Game information
- OU – Lashar 21-yard field goal
- OU – E. Johnson 1-yard run (Lashar kick)
- OU – Lashar 21-yard field goal
- MINN – Starks 12-yard pass from Foggie (Lohmiller kick)

External videos
- Television broadcast
- Game highlights

=== Ohio State ===
#9 Ohio State Buckeyes (5–1) at #20 Minnesota Golden Gophers (5–1)

Quarter	1	2	3	4	Total
Ohio St	0	10	0	13	23
Minnesota	3	9	7	0	19

at Hubert H. Humphrey Metrodome

- Date: October 26, 1985
- Game time: 2:30 p.m.
- Game weather: Indoors (dome)
- Game attendance: 64,455
- Referee: Jim Kemmerling
- Box Score

Game information

First quarter

- MINN – Chip Lohmiller 36-yard field goal, 8:34. Minnesota 3–0. Drive: 10 plays, 52 yards, 4:51.

Second quarter

- MINN – Chip Lohmiller 50-yard field goal, 14:56. Minnesota 6–0. Drive: 10 plays, 50 yards, 5:41.
- OSU – Keith Byars 2-yard run (Rich Spangler kick), 9:37. Ohio St 7–6. Drive: 10 plays, 80 yards, 5:19.
- OSU – Rich Spangler 38-yard field goal, 4:26. Ohio St 10–6. Drive: 9 plays, 34 yards, 4:16.
- MINN – Ricky Foggie 7-yard run (run failed), 0:05. Minnesota 12–10. Drive: 11 plays, 66 yards, 4:15.

Third quarter

- MINN – Ricky Foggie 1-yard run (Chip Lohmiller kick), 6:15. Minnesota 19–10. Drive: 18 plays, 88 yards, 8:45.

Fourth quarter

- OSU – Ed Taggart 1-yard pass from Jim Karsatos (Rich Spangler kick), 14:31. Minnesota 19–17. Drive: 16 plays, 90 yards, 6:44.
- OSU – Vince Workman 16-yard run (pass failed), 10:36. Ohio St 23–19. Drive: 7 plays, 53 yards, 2:55.

Top passers

- OSU – Jim Karsatos – 11/17, 115 yards, TD, INT
- MINN – Ricky Foggie – 14/20, 147 yards, INT

Top rushers

- OSU – Keith Byars – 18 rushes, 67 yards, TD
- MINN – Ricky Foggie – 18 rushes, 57 yards, 2 TD

Top receivers

- OSU – Mike Lanese – 2 receptions, 36 yards
- MINN – Melvin Anderson – 7 receptions, 74 yards

=== Wisconsin ===
Wisconsin Badgers at Minnesota Golden Gophers

Quarter	1	2	3	4	Total
Wisconsin	3	9	0	6	18
Minnesota	7	10	0	10	27

at Hubert H. Humphrey Metrodome, Minneapolis, Minnesota

- Date: November 9, 1985
- Game weather: Indoors (dome)
- Game attendance: 64,571

Game information

- WIS: Gregoire 23-yard field goal
- MIN: M. Anderson 89-yard pass from Foggie (Lohmiller kick)
- WIS: Gregoire 49-yard field goal
- WIS: Howard 4-yard run (run failed)
- MIN: Baylor 5-yard run (Lohmiller kick)
- MIN: Lohmiller 22-yard field goal
- MIN: Puk 32-yard run (Lohmiller kick)
- MIN: Lohmiller 47-yard field goal
- WIS: Vinci 36-yard pass from Howard (pass failed)

Top passers

- WIS – Howard – 16/32, 167 yards
- MINN – Foggie – 5/19, 242 yards, 2 INT

Top rushers

- WIS – Emery – 25 rushes, 124 yards
- MIN – Baylor – 11 rushes, 43 yards

Top receivers

- WIS – Vinci – 2 receptions, 51 yards
- MIN – Couch – 2 receptions, 124 yards

=== Michigan ===
Michigan at Minnesota

Team	1	2	3	4	Total
• No. 8 Wolverines	10	21	17	0	48
Golden Gophers	0	0	0	7	7

- Date: November 16
- Location: Metrodome, Minneapolis, MN
- Game attendance: 64,129

=== At Iowa ===
Minnesota at Iowa

Team	1	2	3	4	Total
Golden Gophers	3	0	0	6	9
• No. 3 Hawkeyes	7	10	7	7	31

- Date: November 23
- Location:
  Kinnick Stadium,
  Iowa City, Iowa
- Game start:
  11:40 a.m. CST
- Elapsed time: 3:00
- Game attendance: 66,020
- Game weather: ~25 °F (−4 °C), Cloudy, Wind NNW 10–15 mph (16–24 km/h)
- Referee: John Nealon
- TV announcers (TBS Sports): Pete van Wieren and Ron Kramer

Scoring summary
1	9:48	Iowa	Ronnie Harmon 5-yard run (Rob Houghtlin kick)	IOWA 7-0
1	1:54	Minn	Chip Lohmiller 35-yard field goal	IOWA 7-3
2	5:15	Iowa	Rob Houghtlin 26-yard field goal	IOWA 10-3
2	1:40	Iowa	Mike Flagg 4-yard pass from Chuck Long (Rob Houghtlin kick)	IOWA 17-3
3	9:39	Iowa	Kevin Harmon 10-yard run (Rob Houghtlin kick)	IOWA 24-3
4	14:11	Iowa	Rick Bayless 5-yard run (Rob Houghtlin kick)	IOWA 31-3
4	2:01	Minn	Gailord 16-yard pass from Holt (conversion failed)	IOWA 31-9

== Personnel ==
1985 Minnesota Golden Gophers football team roster
Players
Coaches
Offense

Pos.	#	Name	Class
RB		Fudgy Abercrombie
WR		Melvin Anderson
RB		Valdez Baylor
WR		Jason Bruce
RB		Gary Couch
QB		Rickey Foggie
RB		Erik Fors
WR		Eugene Gailord
WR		Andy Hare
OL		Ray Hitchcock
OL		Jim Hobbins
RB		Courtney Holmes
QB		Alan Holt
G		Jon Lilleberg (C)
QB		Mike Moe
TE		Craig Otto
RB		Ed Penn
RB		David Puk
DL		Dan Rechtin
RB		Roselle Richardson
RB		Bobby Singletary
TE		Kevin Starks
RB		Terry Stewart
RB		Kevin Wilson
OL		Troy Wolkow

Defense

Pos.	#	Name	Class
DB		Warren Berry
DL		Anthony Burke
DB		Patrick Cummings
LB		Mark Dusbabek
DB		Duane Dutrieulle
DL		Gary Hadd
LB		Bruce Holmes
S		Larry Joyner
DB		Matt Martinez
DL		Doug Mueller
LB		Peter Najarian (C)
DB		Donovan Small
DL		Steve Thompson
DB		David Williams

Special teams

Pos.	#	Name	Class
P		Adam Kelly
K	25	Chip Lohmiller

Head coach

- Lou Holtz

Coordinators/assistant coaches

- John Gutekunst
  (Defensive coordinator)
- George Stewart

Legend

- (C) Team captain
- (S) Suspended
- (I) Ineligible
- Injured
- Redshirt

Roster
