= 1985 Wisconsin Badgers football team =

American college football season

1985 Wisconsin Badgers football
- Conference: Big Ten Conference
- Record: 5–6 (2–6 Big Ten)
- Head coach: Dave McClain (8th season)
- Offensive coordinator: Bill Dudley (6th season)
- Offensive scheme: Pro-style
- Defensive coordinator: Jim Hilles (8th season)
- Base defense: 3–4
- MVP: Larry Emery
- Captains: Russ Fields; Bob Landsee; Troy Spencer
- Home stadium: Camp Randall Stadium

1985 Big Ten Conference football standings
	Conf.					Overall
Team	W		L		T	W		L		T
No. 10 Iowa $	7	–	1	–	0	10	–	2	–	0
No. 2 Michigan	6	–	1	–	1	10	–	1	–	1
Illinois	5	–	2	–	1	6	–	5	–	1
No. 14 Ohio State	5	–	3	–	0	9	–	3	–	0
Michigan State	5	–	3	–	0	7	–	5	–	0
Minnesota	4	–	4	–	0	7	–	5	–	0
Purdue	3	–	5	–	0	5	–	6	–	0
Wisconsin	2	–	6	–	0	5	–	6	–	0
Indiana	1	–	7	–	0	4	–	7	–	0
Northwestern	1	–	7	–	0	3	–	8	–	0
$ – Conference champion; Rankings from AP Poll

The 1985 Wisconsin Badgers football team represented the University of Wisconsin–Madison in the 1985 Big Ten Conference football season. Led by Dave McClain in his eighth and final season as head coach, the Badgers compiled an overall record of 5–6 with a mark of 2–6 in conference play, placing eighth in the Big Ten. Wisconsin played home games at Camp Randall Stadium in Madison, Wisconsin.

== Schedule ==
Date	Opponent	Site	Result	Attendance	Source
September 14	Northern Illinois*	Camp Randall Stadium; Madison, WI	W 38–17	69,131	
September 21	UNLV*	Camp Randall Stadium; Madison, WI	W 26–23	68,123	
September 28	at Wyoming*	War Memorial Stadium; Laramie, WY	W 41–17	11,129	
October 5	at No. 5 Michigan	Michigan Stadium; Ann Arbor, MI	L 6–33	105,491	
October 12	No. 1 Iowa	Camp Randall Stadium; Madison, WI (rivalry)	L 13–23	79,023	
October 19	Northwestern	Camp Randall Stadium; Madison, WI	L 14–17	78,401	
October 26	at Illinois	Memorial Stadium; Champaign, IL	L 25–38	76,395	
November 2	Indiana^{†}	Camp Randall Stadium; Madison, WI	W 31–20	78,605	
November 9	at Minnesota	Hubert H. Humphrey Metrodome; Minneapolis, MN (rivalry)	L 18–27	64,571	
November 16	at No. 3 Ohio State	Ohio Stadium; Columbus, OH	W 12–7	89,873	
November 23	Michigan State	Camp Randall Stadium; Madison, WI	L 7–41	56,854	
*Non-conference game; ^{†}Homecoming; Rankings from AP Poll released prior to the game

== Game summaries ==
=== At Michigan ===
Wisconsin at Michigan

Team	1	2	3	4	Total
Badgers	0	6	0	0	6
• No. 5 Wolverines	7	10	6	10	33

- Date: October 5
- Location: Michigan Stadium, Ann Arbor, Michigan
- Game attendance: 105,491

=== Iowa ===
Iowa at Wisconsin

Team	1	2	3	4	Total
• No. 1 Hawkeyes	3	7	3	10	23
Badgers	0	0	10	3	13

- Date: October 12
- Location: Camp Randall Stadium, Madison, Wisconsin
- Game start: 1:08 p.m. CDT
- Elapsed time: 2:51
- Game attendance: 79,023
- Game weather: 65 °F (18 °C), Cloudy, Wind SSW 10–20 mph (16–32 km/h)
- Referee: John Nealon

Scoring summary
1	3:55	IOWA	Rob Houghtlin 30-yard field goal	IOWA 3-0
2	11:42	IOWA	Bill Happel 8-yard pass from Chuck Long (Rob Houghtlin kick)	IOWA 10-0
3	5:52	WIS	Joe Armentrout 3-yard pass from Bud Keyes (Todd Gregoire kick)	IOWA 10-7
3	3:53	IOWA	Rob Houghtlin 40-yard field goal	IOWA 13-7
3	0:07	WIS	Todd Gregoire 27-yard field goal	IOWA 13-10
4	10:52	IOWA	Ronnie Harmon 12-yard run (Rob Houghtlin kick)	IOWA 20-10
4	6:01	WIS	Todd Gregoire 24-yard field goal	IOWA 20-13
4	3:14	IOWA	Rob Houghtlin 35-yard field goal	IOWA 23-13

=== At Ohio State ===
Wisconsin at Ohio State

Team	1	2	3	4	Total
• Badgers	3	3	6	0	12
No. 3 Buckeyes	0	7	0	0	7

- Date: November 16
- Location: Ohio Stadium, Columbus, Ohio
- Game attendance: 89,873

== Roster ==
1985 Wisconsin Badgers football team roster
Players
Coaches
Offense

Pos.	#	Name	Class
TE	88	Brian Anderson	So
FB	23	Joe Armentrout	Jr
FB	34	Marvin Artley	Fr
WR	85	Fred Bobo	So
FB	31	Brian Bonner	Jr
OT	79	Glenn Derby	So
RB	24	Larry Emery	Jr
WR	20	Tim Fullington	So
C	69	David Gaatz	Sr
RB	43	Jeff Gamber	Sr
G	73	Michael Gorman	So
OT	62	Paul Gruber	So
RB	27	Louis Holland, Jr.	Sr
QB	7	Mike Howard	Jr
G	65	Brian Jansen	Sr
G	74	Tim Jones	Jr
QB	14	Brant Kennedy	So
QB	12	Bud Keyes	So
G	66	Bob Landsee (C)	Sr
C	61	Rodney Lossow	Jr
G	71	Keith Peterson	So
WR	85	James Ross	So
G	57	Bill Schick	Sr
TE	89	Scott Sharron	Sr
G	70	David Sparger	So
TE	97	John Taulien	Sr
WR	6	Reginald Tompkins	Jr
RB	22	Steve Vinci	Fr

Defense

Pos.	#	Name	Class
DT	76	Scott Benschawel	So
NT	63	Michael Boykins	Jr
DT	68	Lance Branaman	Jr
LB	42	Charlie Fawley	Jr
LB	55	Russ Fields (C)	Sr
LB	49	Victor Fortino	Fr
LB	99	Rick Graf	Jr
NT	77	Mark Helt	Sr
LB	84	Brian Hoffman	Sr
S	21	Robb Johnston	Jr
LB	95	Tim Jordan	Jr
DT	54	Jim Kmet	Jr
LB	56	Joe Marconi	Sr
S	8	Pete Nowka	Fr
DB	38	Nate Odomes	Jr
LB	53	Craig Raddatz	Jr
LB	52	Michael Reid	Jr
CB	17	Troy Spencer (C)	Sr
S	16	Eric Sydnor	So
CB	44	Bobby Taylor	Jr
DT	59	Dick Teets	Jr
NT	60	Chad Vande Zande	Fr
S	10	Jeff Wagner	So
CB	4	Robert Williams	Jr
LB	48	David Wings	Fr

Special teams

Pos.	#	Name	Class
P	18	Scott Cepicky	So
K	5	Todd Gregoire	So

Head coach

- Dave McClain

Coordinators/assistant coaches

- Bill Dudley – Offensive Coordinator/Quarterbacks and Running Backs
- Jim Hilles – Assistant Head Coach/Defensive Coordinator/Inside Linebackers
- Dave Anderson – Outside Linebackers
- Steve Carson – Defensive Backs
- Fred Jackson – Wide Receivers
- Arnold Jeter – Defensive Line
- John O'Grady – Offensive Line/Special Teams
- Scott Seeliger – Offensive Line/Tight Ends
- Jerry Fishbain – Recruiting Coordinator
- Brian Borland – Graduate Assistant

Legend

- (C) Team captain
- (S) Suspended
- (I) Ineligible
- Injured
- Redshirt

== Team players in the 1986 NFL draft ==
Player	Position	Round	Pick	NFL club
Bob Landsee	Center	6	149	Philadelphia Eagles
