= Jim Rexilius =

American football coach (1932–2003)

Biographical details
- Born: April 23, 1932; Ithaca, Nebraska, U.S.
- Died: June 25, 2003 (aged 71); Wheaton, Illinois, U.S.

Coaching career (HC unless noted)
- 1981: Wheaton (IL)

Head coaching record
- Overall: 2–7 (college); 177–77 (high school)

James A. Rexilius (April 23, 1932 – June 25, 2003) was an American football coach. He was one of the more prominent and successful coaches in the Chicago area during his career. In 1992, he was inducted into the Illinois High School Football Coaches Hall of Fame.

== Coaching career ==
=== High school ===
Rexilius spent most of his career at Wheaton North High School, where he coached high school football and other sports. In his 27-year coaching career, Rexilius twice led his high-school teams to state championships—first in 1979 and again in 1986 after returning to the secondary-school level. When he retired as head coach, his overall high school record was 177 wins and 77 losses. It was at Wheaton North that he mentored a young Chuck Long toward a career in coaching.

=== Wheaton (IL) ===
Rexilius was head football coach at Wheaton College in Wheaton, Illinois for the 1981 season, compiling a record of 2–7.

== Death ==
Rexilius died of liver cancer, on June 25, 2003, at his home in Wheaton.

== Head coaching record ==
=== College ===
Year	Team	Overall	Conference	Standing	Bowl/playoffs
Wheaton Crusaders (College Conference of Illinois and Wisconsin) (1981)
1981	Wheaton	2–7	1–7	9th	
Wheaton:		2–7	1–7		
Total:		2–7			
