= 1985 Northwestern Wildcats football team =

American college football season

1985 Northwestern Wildcats football
- Conference: Big Ten Conference
- Record: 3–8 (1–7 Big Ten)
- Head coach: Dennis Green (5th season)
- Captains: Casey Cummings; Jim Torkelson
- Home stadium: Dyche Stadium

1985 Big Ten Conference football standings
	Conf.					Overall
Team	W		L		T	W		L		T
No. 10 Iowa $	7	–	1	–	0	10	–	2	–	0
No. 2 Michigan	6	–	1	–	1	10	–	1	–	1
Illinois	5	–	2	–	1	6	–	5	–	1
No. 14 Ohio State	5	–	3	–	0	9	–	3	–	0
Michigan State	5	–	3	–	0	7	–	5	–	0
Minnesota	4	–	4	–	0	7	–	5	–	0
Purdue	3	–	5	–	0	5	–	6	–	0
Wisconsin	2	–	6	–	0	5	–	6	–	0
Indiana	1	–	7	–	0	4	–	7	–	0
Northwestern	1	–	7	–	0	3	–	8	–	0
$ – Conference champion; Rankings from AP Poll

The 1985 Northwestern Wildcats team represented Northwestern University during the 1985 Big Ten Conference football season. In their fifth year under head coach Dennis Green, the Wildcats compiled a 3–8 record (1–7 against Big Ten Conference opponents) and finished in a tie for last place in the Big Ten Conference.

The team's offensive leaders were quarterback Mike Greenfield with 2,152 passing yards, Stanley Davenport with 598 rushing yards, and Curtis Duncan with 498 receiving yards.

== Schedule ==
Date	Opponent	Site	TV	Result	Attendance	Source
September 7	at Duke*	Wallace Wade Stadium; Durham, NC		L 17–40	21,000	
September 14	at Missouri*	Faurot Field; Columbia, MO		W 27–23	46,015	
September 28	Northern Illinois*	Dyche Stadium; Evanston, IL		W 38–16	28,882	
October 5	at Indiana	Memorial Stadium; Bloomington, IN		L 7–26	36,905	
October 12	Minnesota^{†}	Dyche Stadium; Evanston, IL		L 10–21	24,512	
October 19	at Wisconsin	Camp Randall Stadium; Madison, WI		W 17–14	78,401	
October 26	No. 1 Iowa	Dyche Stadium; Evanston, IL		L 10–49	47,269	
November 2	at Purdue	Ross–Ade Stadium; West Lafayette, IN		L 7–31	53,640	
November 9	No. 4 Ohio State	Dyche Stadium; Evanston, IL	WTBS	L 17–35	26,477	
November 16	at Michigan State	Spartan Stadium; East Lansing, MI		L 0–32	55,439	
November 23	Illinois	Dyche Stadium; Evanston, IL (rivalry)		L 20–45	33,054	
*Non-conference game; ^{†}Homecoming; Rankings from AP Poll released prior to the game

== Roster ==
1985 Northwestern Wildcats football team roster
Players
Coaches
Offense

Pos.	#	Name	Class
QB	10	Greg Bradshaw	So
TE	88	Rich Borresen	Sr
OT	75	Matt Burbach	Jr
RB	43	Casey Cummings	Sr
RB	1	Stanley Davenport	So
TE	83	Bob Driscoll	So
WR	82	Curtis Duncan	Jr
QB	14	Mike Greenfield	So
G	61	Steve Hofmann	Jr
OT	70	Daryl Newell	Sr
QB	17	Sandy Schwab	Sr
C	50	John Yale	Sr

Defense

Pos.	#	Name	Class
DT	54	Tom Flaherty	Sr
DT	53	Ted Karras	Jr
LB	35	Rich Myers	So
LB	56	Jim Torkelson	Jr
LB	57	Mike Witteck	Sr

Special teams

Pos.	#	Name	Class

Head coach

- Dennis Green

Coordinators/assistant coaches

Legend

- (C) Team captain
- (S) Suspended
- (I) Ineligible
- Injured
- Redshirt
