= Rickey Foggie =

American gridiron football player (born 1966)

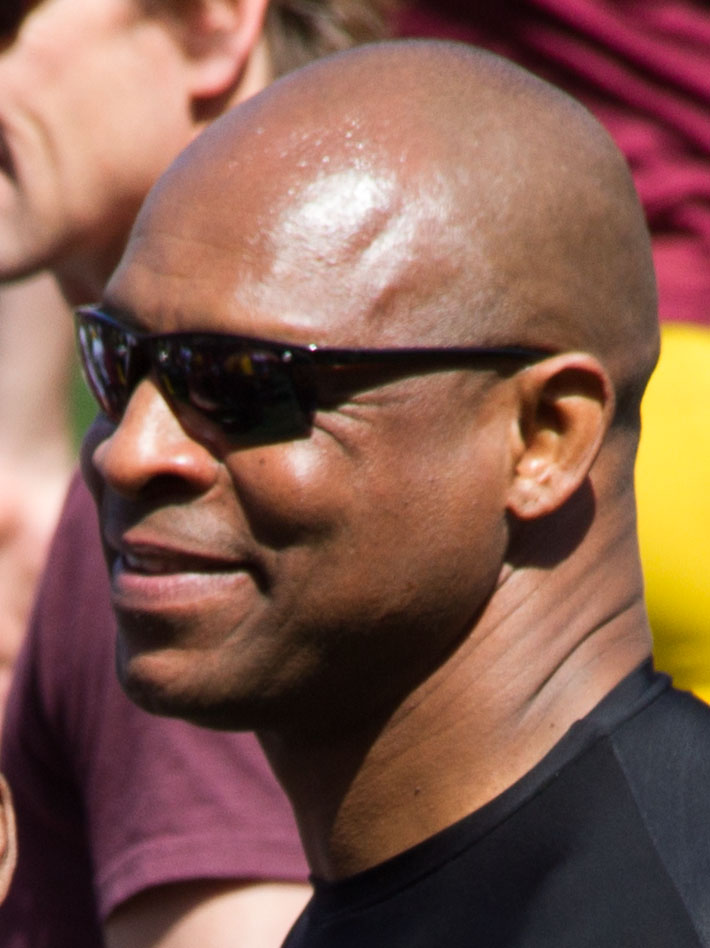
- Foggie participating in the 2013 Minnesota Gophers Alumni Flag Football Game.

No. 14
- Position: Quarterback

Personal information
- Born: July 15, 1966 (age 60); Laurens, South Carolina, U.S.
- Listed height: 6 ft 2 in (1.88 m)
- Listed weight: 195 lb (88 kg)

Career information
- High school: Laurens
- College: Minnesota (1984–1987)
- NFL draft: 1988: undrafted

Career history

Playing
- British Columbia Lions (1988–1990); Toronto Argonauts (1990–1992); Edmonton Eskimos (1993–1994); Memphis Mad Dogs (1995); Minnesota Fighting Pike (1996); Anaheim Piranhas (1997)*; New Jersey Red Dogs (1997–2000); Hamilton Tiger-Cats (1997); Florida Bobcats (2001); Detroit Fury (2002); Toronto Phantoms (2002); British Columbia Lions (2002); Carolina Cobras (2004)
- * Offseason or practice squad member only

Coaching
- Amarillo Dusters (2004) Offensive coordinator; Everett Hawks (2005) Head coach; Macon Knights (2006) Offensive coordinator; Kansas City Brigade (2008) Offensive coordinator; Minnesota Myth (2024) Head coach

Awards and highlights
- 2× Grey Cup champion (1991, 1993); Second-team All-Big Ten (1987)

Career AFL statistics
- Comp. / Att.: 1,472 / 2,601
- Passing yards: 17,921
- TD–INT: 325–80
- Passer rating: 96.38
- Rushing TDs: 18
- Stats at ArenaFan.com

Rickey Foggie (born July 15, 1966) is an American former football quarterback. He was the starting quarterback for the Minnesota Golden Gophers for four seasons, before going on to play professionally in the Canadian Football League (CFL) and Arena Football League (AFL).

== College career ==
Foggie became a successful option quarterback in the South Carolina high school ranks and was recruited by Lou Holtz to play collegiately at the University of Minnesota, where Holtz was coming in to take over the program, after surprisingly leaving powerhouse Arkansas. The Gophers were coming off a 1–10 season under Joe Salem, from the previous year, and it didn't take long for Foggie to assert himself as the starting quarterback for Minnesota as a true freshman. The Gophers finished the 1984 season with a 4–7 record in Holtz’s first season as coach and Foggie’s first year as signal caller, as Foggie started to show off some of his versatile skills, both as a runner and a passer and give Minnesota fans a glimpse of a more promising outlook for the Gophers, with Foggie entrenched at quarterback. The season was topped off by a surprising upset over Iowa and star quarterback Chuck Long, which returned the Floyd of Rosedale to Minnesota after a two-year absence.

In 1985, Foggie’s sophomore season, the Gophers made further strides to be a solid program, as they finished off the regular season at 6–5 and earned an invitation to the Independence Bowl, which was their first bowl game in 8 years. Among the Gophers five defeats were close losses to Oklahoma (who would go on to win the National Championship) and Ohio State. Meanwhile, when the Notre Dame head coaching position became available, Lou Holtz was offered and accepted the job to coach the Irish. Assistant John Gutekunst was named the new head coach and led the Gophers in their bowl game against Clemson, which the Gophers won to raise their final season record to 7–5.

The Gophers finished 6–5 the following year in 1986 and earn another bowl invitation – this time to the Liberty Bowl. They lost to Tennessee in this matchup. Foggie continued to develop into a better and more mature quarterback and was also helped along by the addition of talented freshman running back, Darrell Thompson, who emerged as a star in the making, that season. The highlight of that season was the Gophers upset of Rose Bowl bound Michigan at The Big House – earning Minnesota the Little Brown Jug for the first time in 9 years.

In Foggie’s senior year in 1987, the Gophers again finished 6–5, however, that year they failed to receive a bowl invite.

== Professional career ==
=== Canadian Football League ===
Thought of as running quarterback who wouldn't succeed in the National Football League, Foggie was bypassed in the 1988 NFL draft. Although many felt he would have a better chance of making the NFL at another position, Foggie opted to remain a quarterback and joined the Canadian Football League. He started out in the CFL with the BC Lions backing up Matt Dunigan (reaching the Grey Cup final with the Lions in 1988), whom he followed to the Toronto Argonauts in 1990, in which he won the Grey Cup in 1991. where he was an instrumental part of the league’s highest scoring team. Foggie later played for the Edmonton Eskimos (winning another Grey Cup title with them in 1993) and the Memphis Mad Dogs in the CFL.

=== Arena Football League ===
Next, Foggie embarked on a career in the Arena Football League, where he played eight seasons spanning 10 years. He started off his AFL career back in Minnesota, where he had starred collegiately, as the starting quarterback of the expansion Minnesota Fighting Pike, who only played one season at the Target Center in 1996. Then he quarterbacked the New Jersey Red Dogs from 1997 to 2000, where he attained his greatest success in the AFL, throwing for over 8,700 yards and 155 touchdowns in his first three seasons with the club. In 2001, he played for the Florida Bobcats, where he may have had his best season in the AFL – setting personal season highs with 3619 yards passing and 69 touchdowns. In 2002, he played for the Detroit Fury and the Toronto Phantoms, and then after a season off in 2003, he played one final season in 2004 with the Carolina Cobras. He finished his AFL career with 17,921 yards passing, 325 touchdowns and a 96.38 quarterback rating.

== Coaching career ==
At 38, Foggie retired on the playing field, but continued on in arena football as a coach. Foggie moved to the lower tier af2 to pursue this. In 2005 as the offensive coordinator of the Amarillo Dusters, he orchestrated the highest scoring offense in the af2, with a 55.8 average. In 2006, he got his only head coaching job to date, when he took over the Everett Hawks after an 0–3 start. After only six games as the head man, there, Foggie was lured over to the Macon Knights by head coach Derek Stingley to be their offensive coordinator. In 2007, Foggie followed Stingley to Albany, Georgia to be the offensive coordinator for the South Georgia Wildcats. Foggie also agreed to be the offensive coordinator of Burnsville High School, a suburb of Minneapolis, after the af2 season ends. In 2014, Foggie accepted the position of head coach for the Red Wing (Minnesota) High School football team. Foggie was named head coach of the Eagan High School Wildcats, a metropolitan school in the Minnesota 6A South Suburban Conference, "accepting" the job May 13, 2016, after two seasons at Red Wing. But 10 days later Foggie was out, as a district communication specialist said that was never official and that Foggie had effectively changed his mind. Foggie asserted that he was forced to resign due to an accidental Twitter follow of a pornographic website. In November 2023, Foggie returned to the AFL as he was named head coach of the new Minnesota Myth. On May 10, Foggie resigned as head coach of the Myth.

== Career statistics ==
=== CFL ===
==== Regular season ====
| Year | Team | Games | | | Passing | | | | | | | | Rushing | | | |
| Year | Team | GP | GS | Record | Cmp | Att | Pct | Yds | Y/A | TD | Int | Rtg | Att | Yds | Avg | TD |
|---|---|---|---|---|---|---|---|---|---|---|---|---|---|---|---|---|
| 1988 | BC | 18 | 1 | — | 29 | 78 | 37.2 | 438 | 5.6 | 4 | 5 | 46.8 | 37 | 177 | 5.2 | 3 |
| 1989 | BC | 18 | 0 | — | 26 | 53 | 49.1 | 419 | 7.9 | 5 | 3 | 83.8 | 10 | 89 | 8.9 | 0 |
| 1990 | BC | 5 | 2 | — | 20 | 41 | 48.8 | 252 | 6.1 | 2 | 3 | 54.1 | 9 | 69 | 7.7 | 0 |
| 1990 | TOR | 10 | 4 | — | 89 | 169 | 52.7 | 1,676 | 9.9 | 21 | 5 | 114.5 | 59 | 674 | 11.4 | 5 |
| 1991 | TOR | 18 | 11 | — | 171 | 352 | 48.6 | 3,108 | 8.8 | 21 | 19 | 76.8 | 95 | 644 | 6.8 | 8 |
| 1992 | TOR | 18 | 16 | — | 215 | 482 | 44.6 | 3,507 | 7.3 | 18 | 25 | 60.4 | 67 | 444 | 6.6 | 8 |
| 1993 | EDM | 18 | 1 | — | 42 | 96 | 43.8 | 738 | 7.7 | 4 | 4 | 67.1 | 12 | 32 | 2.7 | 2 |
| 1994 | EDM | 18 | 1 | — | 81 | 156 | 51.9 | 1,098 | 7.0 | 7 | 8 | 68.3 | 21 | 79 | 3.8 | 1 |
| 1995 | MEM | 18 | 4 | — | 76 | 175 | 43.4 | 1,193 | 6.8 | 3 | 7 | 55.7 | 26 | 159 | 6.1 | 0 |
| 1997 | HAM | 9 | 4 | — | 99 | 179 | 55.3 | 1,345 | 7.5 | 5 | 8 | 70.2 | 32 | 138 | 4.3 | 3 |
| 2002 | BC | 14 | 0 | — | 13 | 36 | 36.1 | 235 | 6.5 | 1 | 3 | 33.9 | 7 | 30 | 4.3 | 0 |
| Career | | 164 | 44 | 20–23–1 | 861 | 1,817 | 47.4 | 14,009 | 7.7 | 91 | 90 | 69.8 | 372 | 2,535 | 6.8 | 30 |

=== AFL ===
==== Regular season ====
| Year | Team | Games | | | Passing | | | | | | | | Rushing | | | |
| Year | Team | GP | GS | Record | Cmp | Att | Pct | Yds | Y/A | TD | Int | Rtg | Att | Yds | Avg | TD |
|---|---|---|---|---|---|---|---|---|---|---|---|---|---|---|---|---|
| 1996 | MN | 14 | 14 | 4–10 | 224 | 443 | 50.6 | 2,269 | 5.1 | 40 | 16 | 80.6 | 17 | 17 | 1.0 | 4 |
| 1997 | NJ | 10 | 9 | 5–4 | 195 | 324 | 60.2 | 2,411 | 7.4 | 45 | 12 | 107.4 | 9 | 10 | 1.1 | 1 |
| 1998 | NJ | 14 | 9 | 6–3 | 214 | 358 | 59.8 | 2,812 | 7.9 | 56 | 9 | 113.7 | 21 | 25 | 1.2 | 4 |
| 1999 | NJ | 14 | 14 | 6–8 | 309 | 540 | 57.2 | 3,487 | 6.5 | 54 | 16 | 97.7 | 13 | 39 | 3.0 | 4 |
| 2000 | NJ | 6 | 1 | 1–0 | 20 | 32 | 62.5 | 347 | 10.8 | 8 | 0 | 138.9 | 0 | 0 | 0.0 | 0 |
| 2001 | FL | 14 | 14 | 6–8 | 280 | 507 | 55.2 | 3,619 | 7.1 | 69 | 15 | 105.1 | 23 | -30 | -1.3 | 3 |
| 2002 | DET | 4 | 4 | 1–3 | 58 | 122 | 47.5 | 801 | 6.6 | 16 | 3 | 98.4 | 7 | 13 | 1.9 | 1 |
| 2002 | TOR | 2 | 2 | 0–2 | 32 | 52 | 61.5 | 485 | 9.3 | 10 | 1 | 123.8 | 3 | -6 | -2.0 | 0 |
| 2004 | CAR | 16 | 6 | 3–3 | 140 | 223 | 62.8 | 1,690 | 7.6 | 27 | 8 | 110.6 | 4 | 12 | 3.0 | 1 |
| Career | | 164 | 73 | 32–41 | 1,472 | 2,601 | 56.6 | 17,921 | 6.9 | 325 | 80 | 96.4 | 97 | 80 | 0.8 | 18 |

Sources:1996, 1997, 2002, 2004

=== Statistics ===
| Season | Team | GP | Passing | | | | | | | | Rushing | | | |
| Season | Team | GP | Cmp | Att | Pct | Yds | Y/A | TD | Int | Rtg | Att | Yds | Avg | TD |
|---|---|---|---|---|---|---|---|---|---|---|---|---|---|---|
| 1984 | Minnesota | 11 | 57 | 121 | 47.1 | 1,036 | 8.6 | 10 | 9 | 131.4 | 145 | 647 | 4.5 | 2 |
| 1985 | Minnesota | 10 | 65 | 141 | 46.1 | 1,370 | 9.7 | 7 | 4 | 138.4 | 127 | 451 | 3.6 | 9 |
| 1986 | Minnesota | 11 | 87 | 191 | 45.5 | 1,265 | 6.6 | 8 | 7 | 107.7 | 117 | 349 | 3.0 | 7 |
| 1987 | Minnesota | 11 | 83 | 175 | 47.4 | 1,232 | 7.0 | 8 | 12 | 107.9 | 121 | 591 | 4.9 | 6 |
| Career | | 43 | 292 | 628 | 46.5 | 4,903 | 7.8 | 33 | 32 | 119.2 | 510 | 2,038 | 4.0 | 24 |
