= 1985 Michigan State Spartans football team =

American college football season

1985 Michigan State Spartans football

All-American Bowl, L 14–17 vs. Georgia Tech
- Conference: Big Ten Conference
- Record: 7–5 (5–3 Big Ten)
- Head coach: George Perles (3rd season)
- Defensive coordinator: Nick Saban (3rd season)
- MVP: Lorenzo White
- Captains: Anthony Bell; John Wojciechowski
- Home stadium: Spartan Stadium

1985 Big Ten Conference football standings
	Conf.					Overall
Team	W		L		T	W		L		T
No. 10 Iowa $	7	–	1	–	0	10	–	2	–	0
No. 2 Michigan	6	–	1	–	1	10	–	1	–	1
Illinois	5	–	2	–	1	6	–	5	–	1
No. 14 Ohio State	5	–	3	–	0	9	–	3	–	0
Michigan State	5	–	3	–	0	7	–	5	–	0
Minnesota	4	–	4	–	0	7	–	5	–	0
Purdue	3	–	5	–	0	5	–	6	–	0
Wisconsin	2	–	6	–	0	5	–	6	–	0
Indiana	1	–	7	–	0	4	–	7	–	0
Northwestern	1	–	7	–	0	3	–	8	–	0
$ – Conference champion; Rankings from AP Poll

The 1985 Michigan State Spartans football team was an American football team that represented Michigan State University as a member of the Big Ten Conference during the 1985 Big Ten football season. In their third season under head coach George Perles, the Spartans compiled a 7–5 record (5–3 in conference games), tied for fourth place in the Big Ten, and outscored opponents by a total of 244 to 202. In two games against ranked opponents, they lost to No. 1 Iowa and No. 3 Michigan. They concluded the season with a loss to Georgia Tech in the 1985 All-American Bowl.

Michigan State running back Lorenzo White led the country with 2,066 rushing yards (total including bowl game), finished fourth in the voting for the 1985 Heisman Trophy, and was a consensus first-team pick on the 1985 All-America college football team. The team's other statistical leaders included quarterback Dave Yarema with 755 passing yards and wide receiver Mark Ingram Sr. with 31 receptions and 675 receiving yards.

Six Spartans were recognized by the Associated Press (AP) and/or the United Press International (UPI) on the 1985 All-Big Ten Conference football team: Lorenzo White (AP-1; UPI-1); offensive guard John Wojciechowski (AP-1); offensive tackle Steve Bogdalek (AP-2); linebacker Shane Bullough (AP-2); defensive back Phil Parker (UPI-1); and punter Greg Montgomery (AP-1).

The team played its home games at Spartan Stadium in East Lansing, Michigan.

== Schedule ==
Date	Time	Opponent	Site	TV	Result	Attendance	Source
September 14	12:08 p.m.	Arizona State*	Spartan Stadium; East Lansing, MI		W 12–3	62,797	
September 21	7:46 p.m.	at Notre Dame*	Notre Dame Stadium; Notre Dame, IN (rivalry)	ESPN	L 10–27	59,075	
September 28	1:00 p.m.	Western Michigan*	Spartan Stadium; East Lansing, MI		W 7–3	63,829	
October 5	2:42 p.m.	at No. 1 Iowa	Kinnick Stadium; Iowa City, IA	CBS	L 31–35	66,044	
October 12	2:42 p.m.	No. 3 Michigan	Spartan Stadium; East Lansing, MI (rivalry)	CBS	L 0–31	78,235	
October 19	1:00 p.m.	Illinois^{†}	Spartan Stadium; East Lansing, MI		L 17–30	76,438	
October 26	12:38 p.m.	at Purdue	Ross–Ade Stadium; West Lafayette, IN	TBS	W 28–24	67,660	
November 2	12:08 p.m.	Minnesota	Spartan Stadium; East Lansing, MI	TBS	W 31–26	63,578	
November 9	1:00 p.m.	at Indiana	Memorial Stadium; Bloomington, IN (rivalry)		W 35–16	24,764	
November 16	1:00 p.m.	Northwestern	Spartan Stadium; East Lansing, MI		W 32–0	55,439	
November 23	2:05 p.m.	at Wisconsin	Camp Randall Stadium; Madison, WI		W 41–7	56,854	
December 31	8:00 p.m.	vs. Georgia Tech*	Legion Field; Birmingham, AL (All-American Bowl)	TBS	L 14–17	45,000	
*Non-conference game; ^{†}Homecoming; Rankings from AP Poll released prior to the game

== Game summaries ==
=== At Iowa ===
Michigan State at #1 Iowa

Team	1	2	3	4	Total
Spartans	0	10	14	7	31
• No. 1 Hawkeyes	7	6	15	7	35

- Date: October 5
- Location: Kinnick Stadium, Iowa City, Iowa
- Game start: 1:40 p.m. CDT
- Elapsed time: 3:50
- Game attendance: 66,044
- Game weather: 52 °F (11 °C), Cloudy, Wind NW 20-25 mph (40 km/h)
- Referee: Tom Quinn
- TV announcers (CBS Sports): Brent Musburger and Ara Parseghian

Scoring summary
1	10:23	IOWA	Robert Smith 60-yard pass from Chuck Long (Houghtlin kick)	IOWA 7-0
2	13:12	IOWA	Mike Flagg 17-yard pass from Chuck Long (kick failed)	IOWA 13-0
2	11:34	MSU	Chris Caudell 32-yard field goal	IOWA 13-3
2	9:15	MSU	Andre Rison 50-yard pass from Bobby McAllister (Caudell kick)	IOWA 13-10
3	12:30	MSU	Lorenzo White 23-yard run (Caudell kick)	MSU 17-13
3	7:01	MSU	Lorenzo White 1-yard run (Caudell kick)	MSU 24-13
3	6:16	IOWA	Robert Smith 4-yard pass from Chuck Long (Flagg pass from Long for two-point conversion)	MSU 24-21
3	3:21	IOWA	Mike Flagg 12-yard pass from Chuck Long (Houghtlin kick)	IOWA 28-24
4	4:06	MSU	Craig Johnson 25-yard run (Caudell kick)	MSU 31-28
4	0:27	IOWA	Chuck Long 2-yard run (Houghtlin kick)	IOWA 35-31

- Lorenzo White 39 Rush, 229 Yds, 2 TD

=== Michigan ===
Team	1	2	3	4	Total
• No. 3 Wolverines	14	3	0	14	31
Spartans	0	0	0	0	0

- Date: October 12
- Location: Spartan Stadium, East Lansing, MI

On October 12, 1985, Michigan State lost to Michigan, 31–0, in front of a crowd of 78,235 at Spartan Stadium. The victory was regarded at the time as revenge for the Spartans' 19–7 upset of the Wolverines in 1984. Michigan struck early after Michigan State quarterback Bobby McAllister fumbled the snap on the second play of the game, Andy Moeller recovered the ball on the Spartans' 16-yard line, and Jim Harbaugh threw a touchdown pass to tight end Eric Kattus. Less than two minutes after Michigan's first score, Dieter Heren blocked a Greg Montgomery punt, and Ed Hood recovered the ball in the end zone for Michigan's second touchdown. Harbaugh completed 13 of 23 passes, threw two touchdown passes to Kattus and gave up three interceptions. Jamie Morris rushed for 84 yards on 19 carries. Mike Gillette also kicked a field goal. On defense, Michigan held Lorenzo White (who set a Big Ten record with 2,066 yards in 1985) to a season-low 47 yards on 18 carries. The Wolverines' defense also sacked Bobby McAllister three times, intercepted him once, and held him to 83 passing yards.

=== At Purdue ===
- Lorenzo White 53 Rush, 244 Yds

=== At Indiana ===
- Lorenzo White 25 Rush, 286 Yds, 2 TD (played just over a half)

=== At Wisconsin ===
- Lorenzo White 42 Rush, 223 Yds (set single season Big Ten rushing record)

=== Georgia Tech—All-American Bowl ===
Michigan State vs. Georgia Tech

Team	1	2	3	4	Total
Spartans	0	7	7	0	14
• Yellow Jackets	0	0	7	10	17

- Date: December 31
- Location: Legion Field, Birmingham, AL
- TV announcers: Bob Neal, Tim Foley and Paul Hornung

== Personnel ==
1985 Michigan State Spartans football team roster
Players
Coaches
Offense

Pos.	#	Name	Class
QB	8	Bobby McAllister	Fr
WR	11	Mark Ingram	Jr
RB	21	Bobby Morse	Jr
WR	1	Andre Rison	Fr
C	60	Pat Shurmur	So
RB	34	Lorenzo White	So
QB	14	Dave Yarema	Jr

Defense

Pos.	#	Name	Class
LB	51	Anthony Bell	Sr
LB	41	Shane Bullough	Jr
S	32	Phil Parker	Sr
DE	93	Kelly Quinn	Sr

Special teams

Pos.	#	Name	Class
K		Chris Caudell	Jr
P	23	Greg Montgomery	So

Head coach

- George Perles

Coordinators/assistant coaches

- Nick Saban (defensive coordinator)

Legend

- (C) Team captain
- (S) Suspended
- (I) Ineligible
- Injured
- Redshirt
