= 1985 Peach Bowl =

American college football game

- 18th Peach Bowl
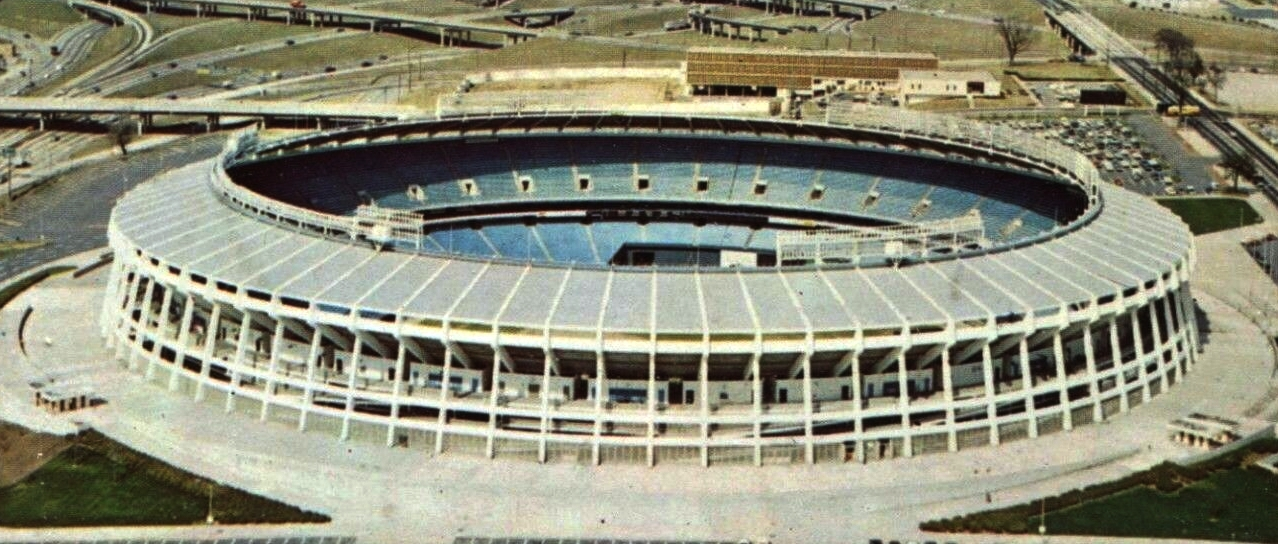
- Atlanta–Fulton County Stadium in Atlanta, Georgia, hosted the Peach Bowl.
Army Cadets	Illinois Fighting Illini
(8–3)	(6–4–1)
Independent	Big Ten
31	29
Head coach: Jim Young	Head coach: Mike White
	1	2	3	4	Total
Army	7	14	7	3	31
Illinois	3	13	7	6	29
- Date: December 31, 1985
- Season: 1985
- Stadium: Fulton County Stadium
- Location: Atlanta, Georgia
- MVP: Offense: Rob Healy (Army); Defense: Peel Chronister (Army)
- Referee: Jimmy Harper (SEC)
- Attendance: 29,857

United States TV coverage
- Network: CBS
- Announcers: Gary Bender and Steve Davis

The 1985 Peach Bowl was a post-season American college football bowl game at Fulton County Stadium in Atlanta, Georgia between the Army Cadets and the University of Illinois Fighting Illini on December 31, 1985. The game was the final contest of the 1985 NCAA Division I-A football season for both teams, and ended in a 31–29 victory for Army, the second bowl victory in school history.

== Game summary ==
On a cold and rainy day in Atlanta, Army scored two touchdowns on halfback option plays and took advantage of four Illini turnovers to carry an eight-point lead into the final five minutes. Trailing 31–23 with less than a minute remaining, Illinois quarterback Jack Trudeau hit All-American receiver David Williams for a 54-yard touchdown to bring the Fighting Illini within two points of a tie. Trudeau's two-point conversion pass attempt was broken up by reserve safety Peel Chronister, and Army handed Illinois its third consecutive Bowl defeat in the 1980s. Trudeau set Peach Bowl records with 38 completions in 55 attempts for 401 yards, and tight end Cap Boso caught a record 9 receptions. The game saw 16 Peach Bowl records broken or tied.

== Scoring summary ==
Quarter	Team	Scoring summary	Score	
Quarter	Team	Scoring summary	Army	Illinois
1	Army	Rob Healy 22-yard touchdown run, Craig Stopa kick good	7	0
1	Illinois	Chris White 45-yard field goal	7	3
2	Illinois	Cap Boso 1-yard touchdown reception from Jack Trudeau, Chris White kick good	7	10
2	Army	Doug Black 1-yard touchdown run, Craig Stopa kick good	14	10
2	Army	Bennie White 33-yard touchdown reception from William Lampley, Craig Stopa kick good	21	10
2	Illinois	David Williams 15-yard touchdown reception from Jack Trudeau, pass failed	21	16
3	Illinois	Ray Wilson 1-yard touchdown run, Chris White kick good	21	23
3	Army	Scott Spellmon 26-yard touchdown reception from Clarence Jones, Craig Stopa kick good	28	23
4	Army	Craig Stopa 39-yard field goal	31	23
4	Illinois	David Williams 54-yard touchdown reception from Jack Trudeau, pass failed	31	29
			31	29

== Statistical summary ==
Team Statistics

(Rushing-Passing-Total): UI - 77-401-478; ARMY - 291-94-385

Individual Statistical Leaders

Rushing (Att.-Yds.-TD): UI - Thomas Rooks 10-35-0, Wilson 8-31-1; ARMY - Healy 23-107-1, Lampley 16-76-0, Black 15-73-1.

Passing (Att.-Comp.-Int.-TD-Yds.): UI - Trudeau 55-38-2-3-401; ARMY - Healy 6-3-1-0-35.

Receiving (No.-Yds.-TD): UI - David Williams 7-109-2, Stephen Pierce 6-92-0, Anthony Williams 5-59-0, Cap Boso 9-52-1.
