= 1985 All-American Bowl =

Michigan State Spartans	Georgia Tech Yellow Jackets
(7–4)	(8–2–1)
14	17
Head coach: George Perles	Head coach: Bill Curry
	1	2	3	4	Total
Michigan State	0	7	7	0	14
Georgia Tech	0	0	7	10	17
- Date: December 31, 1985
- Season: 1985
- Stadium: Legion Field
- Location: Birmingham, Alabama
- MVP: WR Mark Ingram, Sr, Michigan State
- Attendance: 45,000

United States TV coverage
- Network: WTBS
- Announcers: Bob Neal, Tim Foley and Paul Hornung

The 1985 All-American Bowl was a college football postseason bowl game between the Georgia Tech Yellow Jackets and the Michigan State Spartans. The game was the ninth edition of the Hall of Fame Classic and originally took on that moniker. However, the name was changed in the fall of 1985 to the All-American Bowl.

== Background ==
The Spartans tied for fourth in the Big Ten Conference while the Yellow Jackets finished 2nd in the Atlantic Coast Conference.

== Game summary ==
Mark Ingram, Sr caught a touchdown pass from Dave Yarema to give the Spartans a 7–0 lead with 2:03 left in the first half. Todd Rampley responded early in the second half on a touchdown plunge with 11:14 left in the 3rd. Ingram scored his second touchdown on a 27-yard pass from Yarema to make it 14–7 with 4:41 in the quarter. Georgia Tech narrowed the lead on a field foal by David Bell with 7:08 left in the game. However, a fumble by the Spartans was recovered by the Yellow Jackets at the 42 with five minutes remaining, giving them the ball in Michigan State territory. Six plays later, Malcolm King scored on a 5-yard touchdown run with 1:50 left to give Georgia Tech a 17–14 lead, which proved to be victory after Michigan State failed to get in range for the tie. Malcolm King rushed for 122 yards on 16 carries. Mark Ingram, Sr caught 3 passes for 70 yards for the Spartans.

== Aftermath ==
Georgia Tech did not reach another bowl until 1990. Michigan State reached the Rose Bowl in 1987.

The following year, the National Football Foundation and College Hall of Fame decided to relocate the game to Tampa, FL, beginning the Hall of Fame Bowl (later renamed the Outback Bowl and currently known as the Reliaquest Bowl). The game in Birmingham, AL remained, though renamed as the All-American Bowl.

== Statistics ==
Statistics	Michigan State	Georgia Tech
First downs	14	16
Rushes–yards	148	182
Passing yards	85	99
Total yards	233	281
Passes (Att-Comp-Int)	15–6–1	23–12–1
Punts–average	6–36.7	6–37.8
Fumbles–lost	2–1	2–0
Penalties–yards	3–28	5–47
