= Bobby Howard (running back) =

American football player (born 1964)

No. 25
- Position: Running back

Personal information
- Born: June 1, 1964 (age 62); Pittsburgh, Pennsylvania, U.S.
- Listed height: 6 ft 0 in (1.83 m)
- Listed weight: 213 lb (97 kg)

Career information
- High school: Langley (Pittsburgh)
- College: Indiana
- NFL draft: 1986: 12th round, 325th overall pick

Career history
- Tampa Bay Buccaneers (1986–1988); Green Bay Packers (1989)*
- * Offseason or practice squad member only
- Stats at Pro Football Reference

Bobby Allen Howard (born June 1, 1964) is an American former professional football player who was a running back for the Tampa Bay Buccaneers of the National Football League (NFL) from 1986 to 1988. He played college football for the Indiana Hoosiers.

Howard was a 3-sport standout at Langley High School in Pittsburgh, Pennsylvania. As a junior, he ran for over 1,000 yards and scored ten touchdowns in football, averaged 10 points and 11 rebounds for the basketball team which made the state playoffs, and had a .540 batting average for the baseball team. In his senior year, the Langley baseball team won the city championship, with Howard batting .619. After graduating, Howard attended Indiana University Bloomington, where he was the No. 3 tailback as a freshman. In his senior year he was named to UPI's second team all-Big Ten conference. He was voted the team's most valuable player, and gained 967 yards during the season. In April 1986, Howard was selected by the Philadelphia Eagles in the 12th round of the 1986 NFL draft, the 325th overall pick in the draft. After a promising start with the Eagles where he was slated to be on the first team, he was cut during pre-season. In October 1986 he was signed by the Tampa Bay Buccaneers.
