= Chuck Long =

American football player and coach (born 1963)

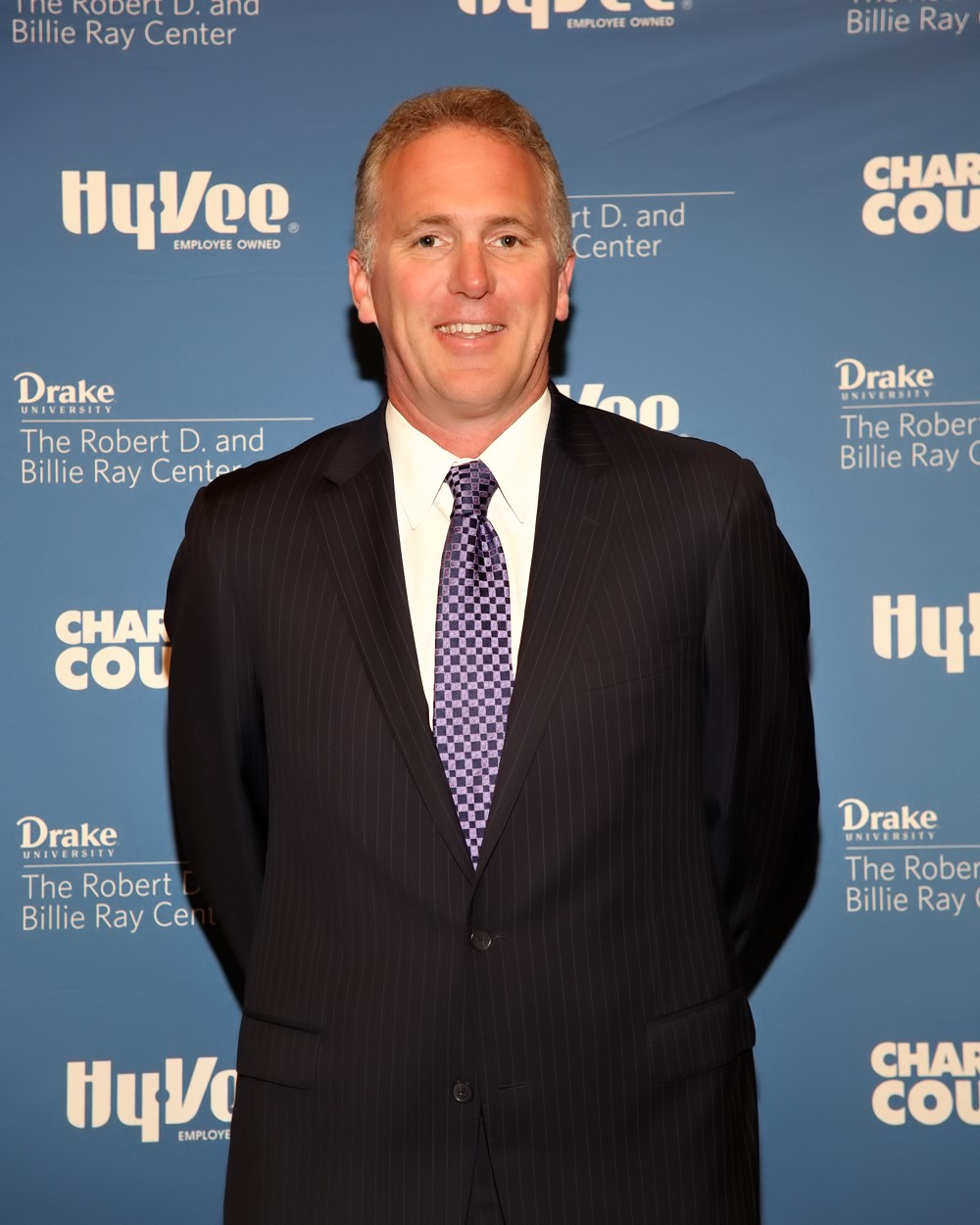
- Long in 2015

No. 16
- Position: Quarterback

Personal information
- Born: February 18, 1963 (age 63); Norman, Oklahoma, U.S.
- Listed height: 6 ft 4 in (1.93 m)
- Listed weight: 217 lb (98 kg)

Career information
- High school: Wheaton North (Wheaton, Illinois)
- College: Iowa (1981–1985)
- NFL draft: 1986: 1st round, 12th overall pick

Career history

Playing
- Detroit Lions (1986–1989); Los Angeles Rams (1990); Detroit Lions (1991–1992; 1994)

Coaching
- Iowa (1995–1997) Defensive backs coach; Iowa (1998–1999) Quarterbacks coach; Oklahoma (2000–2001) Quarterbacks coach & passing game coordinator; Oklahoma (2002–2005) Co-Offensive coordinator & quarterbacks coach; San Diego State (2006–2008) Head coach; Kansas (2010–2011) Offensive coordinator; St. Louis BattleHawks (2020) Offensive coordinator & quarterbacks coach; Arlington Renegades (2023) Co-Offensive coordinator & quarterbacks coach; Arlington Renegades (2024–2025) Offensive coordinator, quarterbacks coach & wide receivers coach

Awards and highlights
- As a player: Maxwell Award (1985); Davey O'Brien Award (1985); Unanimous All-American (1985); Big Ten Male Athlete of the Year (1986); Big Ten Most Valuable Player (1985); Big Ten Co-Player of the Year (1985); 3× First-team All-Big Ten (1983–1985); As a coach: XFL champion (2023)

Career NFL statistics
- Passing attempts: 607
- Passing completions: 331
- Completion percentage: 54.5%
- TD–INT: 19–28
- Passing yards: 3,747
- Passer rating: 64.5
- Stats at Pro Football Reference

Head coaching record
- Career: 9–27 (.250)
- College Football Hall of Fame

Charles Franklin Long Jr. (born February 18, 1963) is an American football coach and former player. He played as a quarterback in college for the Iowa Hawkeyes under coach Hayden Fry and professionally with the Detroit Lions and the Los Angeles Rams of the National Football League (NFL). He was inducted into the College Football Hall of Fame in 1999. After his professional career, Long was an assistant coach at Iowa and Oklahoma before serving as the head football coach for the San Diego State Aztecs. Long also held a position as the offensive coordinator for the Kansas Jayhawks under head coach Turner Gill. Long is the CEO and executive director of the Iowa Sports Foundation, the organization that runs the Iowa Games, the Senior Games, Adaptive Sports Iowa, Iowa Corporate Games and the Live Healthy Iowa challenge, as well as an analyst for the Big Ten Network.

== Background ==
Born in Norman, Oklahoma, and raised in Wheaton, Illinois, Long attended Wheaton North High School and played football, basketball and baseball under Jim Rexilius. He led his team to the 1979 state title in football as the starting quarterback and was named to the all-state championship squad. Long also gathered all-state honors in 1980.

Still, Long was not heavily recruited out of high school, as Long averaged only five to six pass attempts per game. As a result, he did not receive his first recruiting call until Thanksgiving of his senior year. Just three schools looked into offering him a scholarship: Northern Illinois, Northwestern, and Iowa. Long eventually accepted a scholarship to play at Iowa for future Hall of Fame coach Hayden Fry.

== College career ==
=== 1981–1984 ===
Long redshirted for the Iowa Hawkeyes in 1981. However, the redshirting rule was new, so Long was only able to take a couple of snaps during his redshirt season. The current redshirt rule (2018) allows a player to participate in up to four games during his/her redshirt season and retain a year of eligibility. While Long played very sparingly in 1981, he did run a couple of plays at the very end of the 1982 Rose Bowl; because of this, he later became the first College Football Player to ever play in five bowl games.

Before the 1982 season, Hayden Fry said that Long was "destined for greatness", which was a bold statement considering that Long was so lightly recruited out of high school. Long started in the first game of the 1982 season, but he was benched for a game after a loss to Nebraska. He was reinserted as a starter in the third game of the 1982 season and led Iowa to a win over Arizona. Long never lost his starting spot again while at Iowa.

Long threw for 1,374 yards and eight touchdowns as a freshman. It was the third most passing yardage in a single season ever at Iowa, behind Gary Snook and Larry Lawrence. His 64.2 completion percentage was a school record. Iowa had a 7–4 record before defeating Tennessee in the 1982 Peach Bowl. Long was the offensive player of the game after completing 19 of 26 passes for a career-high 304 yards.

As a sophomore in 1983, Long passed for a school record 345 yards in a 42–35 win at Penn State. A few weeks later, he completed just 12 of 27 passes in a loss to Illinois; it would be the only time in his college career as a starter that he failed to complete at least half of his passes. The following week against Northwestern, Long broke his own school record for passing yards and helped Iowa set a new conference record with 713 yards of total offense. He accounted for 398 yards of total offense, also a school record. By the end of his sophomore year, Long owned Iowa's school records for yards passing in a season and a career, touchdown passes in a season and a career, and total offense in a season and a career. He led Iowa to a 9–2 record in the 1983 season and a berth in the Gator Bowl after being named first team all-Big Ten.

Long was again an all-Big Ten selection as a junior in 1984, as he finished first in the Big Ten in passing efficiency. Long completed 22 consecutive passes against Indiana, setting an NCAA record. He also finished seventh in the Heisman Trophy balloting as a junior. Iowa had a 7–4–1 record after the 1984 regular season and accepted an invitation to the Freedom Bowl against Texas.

A windy, rainy day did not slow Long in what some felt might be his final college game. Iowa destroyed Texas, 55–17, the second most points ever scored against Texas and the most in 80 years. Long broke a 24–17 game at halftime wide open by completing 12 of 14 passes for 241 yards and four touchdowns in the third quarter alone. For the game, Long was offensive MVP as he completed a school record 29 passes in 39 attempts for a bowl record 461 yards and a bowl record 6 touchdowns.

=== The 1985 season ===
After much consideration, Long delighted Iowa Hawkeye fans by declaring that he would return for his senior season. He became an instant Heisman Trophy candidate, and Iowa was a preseason top five team. After three weeks in 1985, the Hawkeyes ascended to #1 in the national rankings.

In Iowa's first game at #1, the Hawkeyes played Michigan State. A seesaw game had Michigan State leading, 31–28, in the waning minutes. Long drove Iowa the length of the field, and the Hawkeyes faced fourth and goal from the two-yard line with just 27 seconds remaining. Since college football had no overtime rule at the time, Iowa needed to go for the touchdown and the win rather than attempt a tie. Long faked a handoff to running back Ronnie Harmon and then ran to his right. His fake had fooled the Spartan defenders, and Long ran into the endzone, holding the ball high above his head as he crossed the goal line to give Iowa a 35–31 victory. He completed a school record 30 passes on 39 attempts for 380 yards and scored five touchdowns (four passing and the game winning score rushing) in the game.

Two weeks later, #1 Iowa faced #2 Michigan in Kinnick Stadium. Iowa trailed 10–9 as the Hawkeyes regained possession of the football at their own 22-yard line with just 5:27 remaining in the game. Long led Iowa on a 66-yard drive against the nation's top-ranked defense, twice converting third-and-eight situations by completing passes to tight end Mike Flagg. Long drove the Iowa team to the 12-yard line with two seconds remaining to set up kicker Rob Houghtlin's game-winning field goal as time expired. Long completed 26 of 39 passes for 297 yards in Iowa's 12–10 win.

A loss to Ohio State cost Iowa their #1 ranking, but the Hawkeyes still won the Big Ten title outright for the first time in 27 years. Long won many major national awards as a senior, including the 1985 Maxwell Award, given to the nation's top player and the Davey O'Brien Award, given to the nation's top quarterback. He was the Big Ten Player of the Year and a consensus first team All-American. Finally, Long was the runner-up for the Heisman Trophy to Bo Jackson of Auburn in the second closest race in the award's history, losing by just 45 points.

Though Iowa lost in Long's final game in the 1986 Rose Bowl, the loophole with the redshirting rule allowed Long to play in his fifth bowl game.

Long's Iowa teams compiled a 35–13–1 record. He graduated with 10,461 passing yards and 74 touchdowns on 782 completions. He held every passing record at the University of Iowa except one (passes attempted in a game) when he graduated. Long holds the best completion percentage of any college quarterback all-time who has attempted more than 1,000 career passes. He was also the first Big Ten player and just the second player in college football history to throw for more than 10,000 yards in a career. The first was Doug Flutie. Long was inducted into the College Football Hall of Fame in 1999 and the Iowa Sports Hall of Fame in 2001.

On December 12, 2014, the Big Ten Network included Long on "The Mount Rushmore of Iowa Football", as chosen by online fan voting. Long was joined in the honor by Nile Kinnick, Alex Karras and Tim Dwight. Of the honor, Long told BTN Live host Mike Hall: "It's a great honor. It was a great time to be a Hawkeye during those years. I'm very honored to be on that list."

== Professional career ==
Drafted 12th overall in the first round by the Detroit Lions in the 1986 NFL draft, Long's NFL career was disappointing. During Long's rookie season in the NFL, he was called into a game after an injury suffered by then-starting quarterback Joe Ferguson. His best season was 1987, in which he threw 2,598 yards, 11 touchdowns and 20 interceptions. Long played for the Lions from 1986 to 1989 before being traded to the Los Angeles Rams in 1990. After one year in Los Angeles, Long returned to Detroit for the 1991 season, though he did not attempt any passes.

== Coaching career ==
Long transitioned to a career as a football coach. He returned to his alma mater in 1995, serving as Iowa's defensive backs coach. Though Long had no coaching experience and had played on the offensive side of the ball for his entire career, he quickly became a respected defensive coach. In his three seasons coaching defensive backs from 1995 to 1997, Iowa posted a 24–12 record and advanced to a bowl game all three years. Iowa led the nation in interceptions returned for touchdowns in 1995, while the 1997 squad led the Big Ten in interceptions.

Long switched to coaching Iowa's quarterbacks and special teams in 1998. After the 1998 season, Iowa coach Hayden Fry retired, and though Long was considered for the job, Fry was ultimately succeeded by Kirk Ferentz. Ferentz retained Long from Fry's staff, and Long served Ferentz in the same capacity for the 1999 season.

After five seasons coaching at Iowa, Long left the Hawkeyes to become the quarterbacks coach at Oklahoma. Oklahoma coach Bob Stoops and Long were teammates on Iowa's 1982 Rose Bowl team. Long was an assistant on the Oklahoma team that claimed the 2000 Bowl Championship Series national title. He coached quarterback Josh Heupel to a second-place finish in the Heisman Trophy balloting that year.

After the 2001 season, Long was promoted to Oklahoma's offensive coordinator position. Oklahoma won the Rose Bowl following the 2002 season, and in 2003, the Sooners set a Big 12 Conference record by averaging 51.5 points per game.

In 2004, Long was named as a finalist for the Broyles Award as the nation's top assistant coach. He was an assistant coach at Oklahoma for six seasons, including four as an offensive coordinator, and Oklahoma compiled a 67–11 record during his time there.

After the 2005 season, Long landed his first head coaching position when he was hired as the 16th head football coach at San Diego State University. Long had a record of 9–27 in three seasons as SDSU's head coach. On November 23, 2008, college president Stephen Weber announced that Athletic Director Jeff Schemmel had dismissed Long prior to the final game of the season. Coach Long finished his third season only winning 2 out of 12 games, including the one conference win on his final night. San Diego State finished the 2008 season with a 2–10 record, the first and only ten-loss season in school history. Long also had the distinction of having his team lose two games to Division I-AA Cal Poly San Luis Obispo (in his first and third seasons with the Aztecs, respectively).

Long was offensive coordinator for the Kansas Jayhawks. Long became part of the coaching staff under head coach Turner Gill after the departure of Mark Mangino, Long's former co-worker at Oklahoma.

In 2012, Long became receivers coach at Norman High School in Norman, Oklahoma.

In 2019, Long was hired by the St. Louis BattleHawks of the XFL as running backs coach. He was promoted to offensive coordinator and quarterbacks coach on January 11, 2020.

Long was officially hired by the Arlington Renegades on September 13, 2022

== Family ==
Long is married with five children.

== Head coaching record ==
| Year | Team | Overall | Conference | Standing |
|---|---|---|---|---|
San Diego State Aztecs (Mountain West Conference) (2006–2008)
| 2006 | San Diego State | 3–9 | 3–5 | T–6th |
| 2007 | San Diego State | 4–8 | 3–5 | 6th |
| 2008 | San Diego State | 2–10 | 1–7 | T–8th |
| San Diego State: | | 9–27 | 7–17 | |
| Total: | | 9–27 | | |
