= Ray Wallace (American football) =

American football player (born 1963)

No. 35, 43
- Position: Running back

Personal information
- Born: December 3, 1963 (age 62); Indianapolis, Indiana, U.S.
- Listed height: 6 ft 0 in (1.83 m)
- Listed weight: 224 lb (102 kg)

Career information
- High school: North Central (Indianapolis)
- College: Purdue
- NFL draft: 1986: 6th round, 145th overall pick

Career history
- Houston Oilers (1986–1988); Pittsburgh Steelers (1989)

Career NFL statistics
- Rushing yards: 330
- Rushing average: 4.3
- Rushing touchdowns: 4
- Stats at Pro Football Reference

Raymond Duryea Wallace (born December 3, 1963) is an American former professional football player who was a running back in the National Football League (NFL) for the Houston Oilers and Pittsburgh Steelers. He played college football for the Purdue Boilermakers.
