= Jim Everett =

American football player (born 1963)

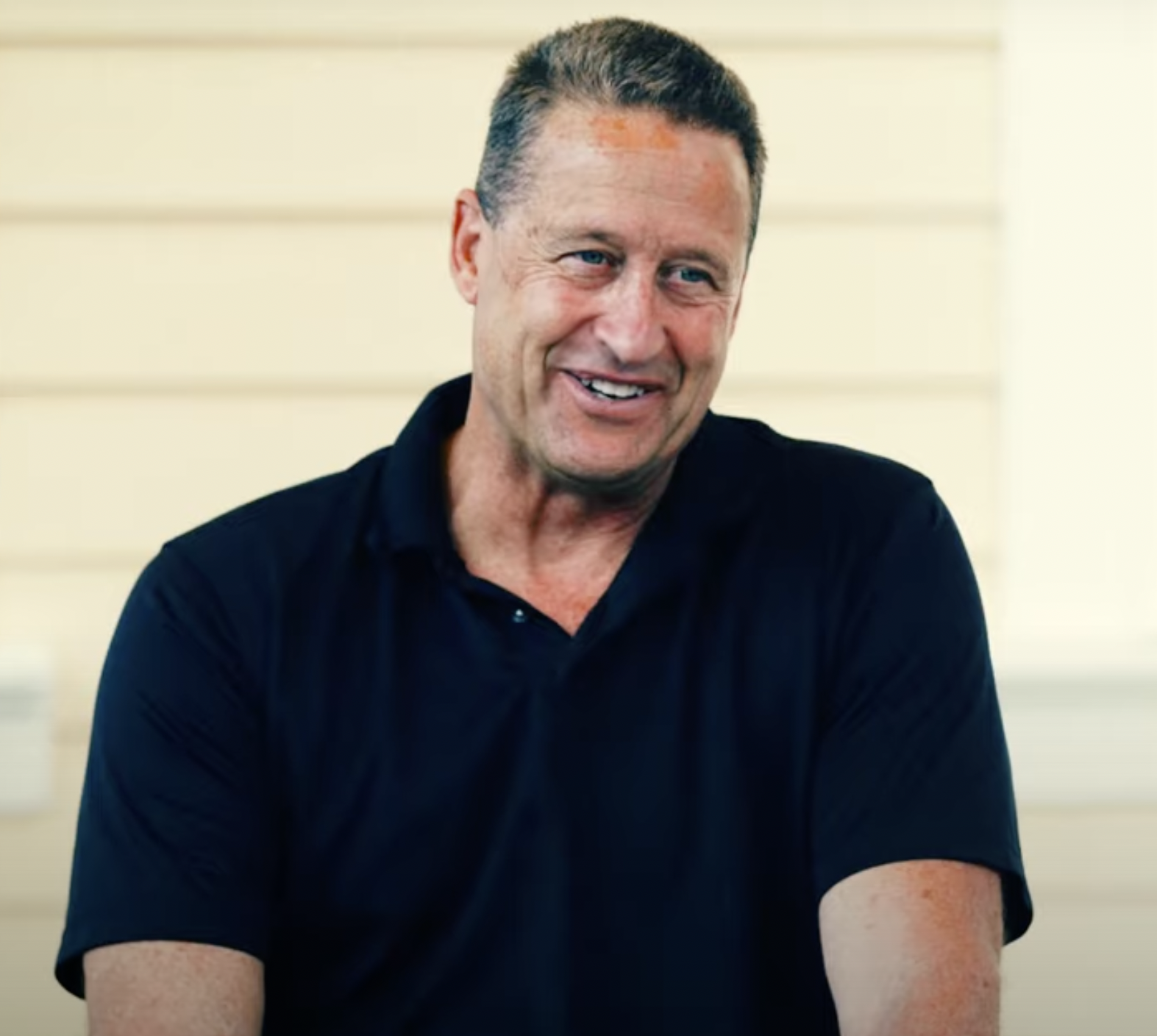
- Everett in 2021

No. 11, 17
- Position: Quarterback

Personal information
- Born: January 3, 1963 (age 63); Emporia, Kansas, U.S.
- Listed height: 6 ft 5 in (1.96 m)
- Listed weight: 212 lb (96 kg)

Career information
- High school: Eldorado (Albuquerque, New Mexico)
- College: Purdue (1981–1985)
- NFL draft: 1986: 1st round, 3rd overall pick

Career history
- Los Angeles Rams (1986–1993); New Orleans Saints (1994–1996); San Diego Chargers (1997)

Awards and highlights
- Pro Bowl (1990); 2× NFL passing touchdowns leader (1988, 1989); PFWA All-Rookie Team (1986); Second-team All-American (1985)

Career NFL statistics
- Passing attempts: 4,923
- Passing completions: 2,841
- Completion percentage: 57.7%
- TD–INT: 203–175
- Passing yards: 34,837
- Passer rating: 78.6
- Stats at Pro Football Reference

James Samuel Everett III (born January 3, 1963) is an American former professional football player who was a quarterback for 12 seasons in the National Football League (NFL), primarily with the Los Angeles Rams. He played college football for the Purdue Boilermakers and was selected third overall in the 1986 NFL draft by the Houston Oilers. Unable to work out a contract agreement with Everett, the Oilers traded his rights to the Rams, where he played from 1986 to 1993. Everett then played with the New Orleans Saints from 1994 to 1996 and ended his career with a stint with the San Diego Chargers in 1997.

== College career ==
Purdue University recruited Everett out of Eldorado High School in Albuquerque, New Mexico. He led his high school team to the state championship game in 1979 against the Demons of Santa Fe High School. The Demons' stifling defense (held opponents to 100 points) and record-setting offense (547 points scored) handed Everett and his Eagle teammates their second loss of the season, and avenged a loss the Demons suffered earlier in the year. In 1980, they finally won the school's only state championship. In addition to quarterbacking the team, he played defense as a safety.

Recruited to play either safety or quarterback, he was soon slotted into the quarterback role where he narrowly missed out on being a 1st year starter at Purdue, as a game-day decision before his first game as a freshman led to Scott Campbell getting the nod over Everett. Campbell held off Everett for three years, one of which Everett was able to redshirt to gain an extra year of eligibility. Upon Campbell's graduation to a seven-year career in the NFL, Everett took over the reins of the pass-oriented Boilermakers offense.

As a junior, Everett opened the 1984 season by leading the Boilermakers to an upset of the No. 8 Notre Dame Irish in the inaugural game of the Hoosier Dome, Everett was great, connecting on 20 of 28 passes for 255 yards and two touchdowns, the Boilers won 23-21; four weeks later he again led the Boilers to an upset of No. 2 Ohio State. On November 3rd, he scored a hat-trick of sorts by leading the Boilers over Michigan, a feat no other Purdue quarterback has achieved in a single season. Capping off his junior season, he led the Boilermakers to the 1984 Peach Bowl, where he passed for 253 yards and three touchdowns. Purdue lost the game to Virginia, quarterbacked by future Green Bay Packer Don Majkowski, 27–24.

During the 1985 season, Everett finished with 3,589 yards of total offense, second in the nation behind Robbie Bosco of BYU, and a school record at the time (later surpassed by Drew Brees). He finished sixth in balloting for the 1985 Heisman Trophy, and was a second-team All-American.

Everett earned regular membership on the Distinguished Students list at Purdue, and graduated with a degree in industrial management. During his time at Purdue, Everett regularly tutored fellow Purdue athletes in courses such as calculus and statistical analysis. He was also initiated into the Sigma Chi fraternity as an undergraduate. During his senior year, he was awarded the Big Ten Medal of Honor in recognition of his athletic and academic achievements.

- 1984: 3,256 yards with 18 TD vs 16 INT in 11 games
- 1985: 3,651 yards with 23 TD vs 11 INT in 11 games

== NFL career ==
=== 1986 draft and trade to Rams ===
Before the 1986 draft, Everett was generally rated the best quarterback available, although some scouts had him behind Iowa’s Chuck Long. The Indianapolis Colts traded up from the sixth position to the fourth with the expected goal of drafting Everett before the St. Louis Cardinals, who picked fifth, did so. However, Everett would be drafted third overall by the Houston Oilers. It is widely believed the Oilers, who possessed a developing franchise quarterback in Warren Moon and a capable backup in Oliver Luck — drafted Everett merely to prevent the Colts doing so.

Conflicts between Oiler general manager Ladd Herzeg and Everett's agent Marv Demoff meant Everett would never sign with the Oilers, although the team offered him a four-year, $3.7 million contract in mid-August. A wait-and-see attitude regarding established starter Moon meant that the Oilers did not consider trading Everett until the last week of August. Eventually, when protracted negotiations between ownership and Demoff broke down with the regular season already underway, the Oilers decided to trade Everett. The San Francisco 49ers, who had lost champion Joe Montana for the season to back surgery, were initially expected to gain his services. On September 18, he would be traded to the Los Angeles Rams in exchange for OG Kent Hill, DE William Fuller, 1987 1st-round pick, 1987 5th-round pick, and 1988 1st-round pick.

=== Los Angeles Rams ===
With the Rams, Everett became a statistical leader in several passing categories. His Rams teams were successful early in his career, earning playoff berths in 1986, 1988, and 1989, despite never reaching the Super Bowl. Everett continued to produce fine statistics, and was rewarded with a trip to the 1991 Pro Bowl in Honolulu, Hawaii.

Despite productive years with the Rams, 1989 marked Everett's final playoff season in his NFL career. Starting in 1990, the Rams began to trade or release players due to financial concerns. For example, LeRoy Irvin spent his final season with the Lions, while Greg Bell, who had been the team's starting running back, spent 1990 across town. After winning 13 games in 1989 (including 2 playoff wins), the Rams won 19 games combined in the next four seasons (5 in 1990, 3 in 1991, 6 in 1992, 5 in 1993).

The 1993 season was a low point in Everett's career. He played in only 10 games but managed to throw 12 interceptions. He threw only eight touchdown passes, tying the lowest yearly total of his career and matching his rookie total when he only played in six games. Around mid-season, Rams coach Chuck Knox benched him for T. J. Rubley.

=== New Orleans Saints ===
The Rams traded Everett to the Saints in March 1994. In return, the Los Angeles Times reported, Los Angeles received "a seventh-round pick in the 1995 draft".

In three years with the Saints, benefiting from receivers such as Quinn Early and former Falcon receiver Michael Haynes and former Bear fullback Brad Muster in the backfield, Everett threw 22, 26, and 12 touchdowns. Nevertheless, the team finished 7–9, 7–9, and 3–13 in those three years, respectively. The Saints, like many other NFL teams, released or traded core players when the NFL's salary cap took effect around the time Everett arrived. The Dome Patrol defense had also largely been dismantled by 1994. Only Sam Mills remained on the Saints' roster by 1994, and that was Mills's final season, as he departed for the expansion Carolina Panthers the following year. Running backs Dalton Hilliard and Craig Heyward had also both left the Saints by 1994.

=== San Diego Chargers ===
Everett signed with the Chargers in June 1997. In his first start for San Diego, he defeated the Saints, 20–6, in his return to the Superdome. 1997 was his final NFL season.

Over his career, Everett performed well enough to be among league leaders in several passing categories. His 203 touchdown passes rank 45th all-time, and his 34,837 passing yards are 33rd all-time. He also ranks 35th all-time in completions and 32nd all-time in pass attempts. On a year-to-year basis, he was among the top ten league leaders in pass attempts (seven times), completions (eight times), pass yards (seven times), and passing touchdowns (six, including leading the league twice).

Everett's two postseason victories (both in 1989) tied him with Vince Ferragamo, James Harris, and Norm Van Brocklin for second-most playoff victories during the Rams' first stint in Los Angeles (as of 2018, it is now the third-most). Only Ferragamo had more wins (three) during the Rams' 49-year stint in Los Angeles. Kurt Warner's five playoff victories during the Rams' years in St. Louis have since superseded Ferragamo's record.

== NFL career statistics ==
Legend
| | Pro Bowl selection |
| | Led the league |
| **Bold** | Career high |

=== Regular season ===
| Year | Team | Games | | | Passing | | | | | | | | |
| Year | Team | GP | GS | Record | Cmp | Att | Pct | Yds | Avg | TD | Int | Lng | Rtg |
|---|---|---|---|---|---|---|---|---|---|---|---|---|---|
| 1986 | LAR | 6 | 5 | 3–2 | 73 | 147 | 49.7 | 1,018 | 6.9 | 8 | 8 | 60 | 67.8 |
| 1987 | LAR | 11 | 11 | 5–6 | 162 | 302 | 53.6 | 2,064 | 6.8 | 10 | 13 | **81** | 68.4 |
| 1988 | LAR | **16** | **16** | 10−6 | 308 | 517 | 59.6 | 3,964 | 7.7 | **31** | 18 | 69 | 89.2 |
| 1989 | LAR | **16** | **16** | **11−5** | 304 | 518 | 58.7 | **4,310** | **8.3** | 29 | 17 | 78 | **90.6** |
| 1990 | LAR | **16** | **16** | 5−11 | 307 | 554 | 55.4 | 3,989 | 7.2 | 23 | 17 | 55 | 79.3 |
| 1991 | LAR | **16** | **16** | 3–13 | 277 | 490 | 56.5 | 3,438 | 7.0 | 11 | **20** | 78 | 68.9 |
| 1992 | LAR | **16** | **16** | 6–10 | 281 | 475 | 59.2 | 3,323 | 7.0 | 22 | 18 | 67 | 80.2 |
| 1993 | LAR | 10 | 9 | 3−6 | 135 | 274 | 49.3 | 1,652 | 6.0 | 8 | 12 | 60 | 59.7 |
| 1994 | NO | **16** | **16** | 7−9 | **346** | 540 | **64.1** | 3,855 | 7.1 | 22 | 18 | 78 | 84.9 |
| 1995 | NO | **16** | **16** | 7−9 | 345 | **567** | 60.8 | 3,970 | 7.0 | 26 | 14 | 70 | 87.0 |
| 1996 | NO | 15 | 15 | 3−12 | 267 | 464 | 57.5 | 2,797 | 6.0 | 12 | 16 | 51 | 69.4 |
| 1997 | SD | 4 | 1 | 1−0 | 36 | 75 | 48.0 | 457 | 6.1 | 1 | 4 | 62 | 49.7 |
| Career | | 158 | 153 | 64–89 | 2,841 | 4,923 | 57.7 | 34,837 | 7.1 | 203 | 175 | 81 | 78.6 |

== Jim Rome altercation ==
Following the 1989 regular season, Everett was reportedly "shellshocked" from the numerous times he was sacked and hit in the NFC Championship Game against the San Francisco 49ers (the 49ers won, 30–3). At one point in the game, Everett was so rattled that he collapsed to the ground in the pocket in anticipation of a sack, even though the 49ers' defensive players had not yet reached him, a play now known as Everett's "phantom sack".

His struggle eventually led to a 1994 confrontation with then Talk2 host Jim Rome. Rome had regularly mocked Everett's aversion to taking hits on the field, mockingly referring to him as "Chris" Everett (a reference to female tennis player, Chris Evert). When Everett appeared as a guest on Talk2, Rome wasted no time, calling him "Chris". Everett dared Rome to repeat it to his face again, implying that a physical confrontation would ensue were Rome to do so. When Rome did it anyway, Everett overturned the table between them and shoved Rome to the floor while still on the air. Rome was not injured and no legal action was taken following the confrontation.

In a 2012 interview with Deadspin, Everett stated that "a large burger franchise" wanted to use the footage in an ad. Everett agreed, but Rome did not, blocking the deal.

== Post-NFL ==
After his NFL career ended, Everett received an MBA degree from Pepperdine University and started an asset management business. Eventually, he settled in Dana Point, California.

== See also ==
- List of most consecutive starts by a National Football League quarterback
- List of NCAA major college football yearly total offense leaders
