= Jim Karsatos =

American football quarterback (1963–2025)

Jim Karsatos (May 26, 1963 – February 8, 2025) was an American college football player who was a starter at quarterback for two years with the Ohio State Buckeyes. He was of Greek-American origin from the island of Kefalonia. He is one of two football players from the Greek island of Kefalonia that played at Sunny Hills High School in Fullerton, California (Robert Evangelatos Oliver, a star running back in the mid-1990s, also attended Sunny Hills).

Karsatos was selected in the 1987 NFL draft by the Miami Dolphins. He spent two years with the Dolphins.

Karsatos died on February 8, 2025, at the age of 61.
