= Peach Bowl =

Annual American college football postseason game

- Chick-fil-A Peach Bowl
- Stadium: Mercedes-Benz Stadium
- Location: Atlanta, Georgia
- Previous stadiums: Grant Field (1968–1970); Atlanta–Fulton County Stadium (1971–1992); Georgia Dome (1993–2016)
- Operated: 1968–present
- Championship affiliation: CFP (2014–present)
- Previous conference tie-ins: SEC, ACC
- Payout: US$3,967,500 (ACC) (As of 2011); US$2,932,500 (SEC) (As of 2011)
- Website: chick-fil-apeachbowl.com

Sponsors
- Chick-fil-A (1997–present)

Former names
- Peach Bowl (1968–1996); Chick-fil-A Peach Bowl (1997–2005); Chick-fil-A Bowl (2006–2013)

2026 matchup
- Indiana vs. Oregon (Indiana 56–22)

The Peach Bowl is an annual college football bowl game played in Atlanta, Georgia, since December 30, 1968.

The first three Peach Bowls were played at Grant Field on the Georgia Tech campus in Atlanta. Between 1971 and 1992, Atlanta–Fulton County Stadium hosted the game. From 1993 to 2016, the game was played at the Georgia Dome. The bowl then moved to Mercedes-Benz Stadium starting in 2017. Since 1997, it has been sponsored by Chick-fil-A and is officially known as the Chick-fil-A Peach Bowl. From 2006 to 2013, it was named the Chick-fil-A Bowl.

From its beginning, the Peach Bowl often featured teams from the Atlantic Coast Conference (ACC) and the Southeastern Conference (SEC). Between 1993 and 2013, the ACC and SEC established official tie-ins with the bowl game.

In 2014, the Peach Bowl, along with the "New Year's Six" bowls, became a part of the College Football Playoff. As part of the four team playoff from 2014 to 2023, the Peach Bowl served as a semifinal game in 2016, 2019, and 2022.

With the expansion of the College Football Playoff to 12 teams in the 2024–25 season, the Peach Bowl serves as either a quarterfinal or semifinal each season. It served as a quarterfinal in January 2025 and served as a semifinal in January 2026. When serving as a semifinal, the game is played a week after New Year's Day.

The winner of the bowl game is awarded the George P. Crumbley Trophy, named after the game's founder, George Crumbley.

== History ==
The Peach Bowl was approved by the NCAA on May 1, 1968. The game was created to serve as a fundraiser for the Georgia Lighthouse for the Blind Foundation, a project of the Lions Clubs of Georgia. Creation of the bowl is credited to Lions Club member George Pierre Crumbley Jr., known as the "Father of the Peach Bowl", who shepherded it through NCAA certification. While the Peach Bowl has been described as "the nation's first charity bowl", it was predated by other such games, such as the Pythian Bowl (1949–1951).

In 1986, following years of lackluster attendance and revenue, the Peach Bowl was taken over by the Atlanta Chamber of Commerce.

Seven of the first ten meetings (all but the 1968, 1971, and 1974 games) pitted an Atlantic Coast Conference (ACC) team against an at-large opponent. The bowl had no automatic berths prior to 1993, but usually featured an ACC team or a team from the Southeastern Conference (SEC). From 1993 until 2013, the game matched an SEC team against one from the ACC. From 1993 to 2005, this matchup was the third selection from the ACC against the fourth from the SEC.

Chick-fil-A, a fast food restaurant chain based in nearby College Park, has sponsored the game since 1997. From 2006 until 2013, Chick-fil-A's contract gave it full naming rights and the game was referred to as the Chick-fil-A Bowl as a result. Funds from the sponsorship deal were used to increase payouts for the participating teams. In response, from 2006 to 2014, the ACC gave the committee the first pick of its teams after the BCS—usually the loser of the ACC Championship Game or one of the division runners-up. Also from 2006, the bowl got the fifth overall selection from the SEC (including the BCS). However, the BCS took two SEC schools in every season for the last nine years of its run, leaving the Chick-Fil-A with the sixth pick from the conference—usually one of the division runners-up.

In 2007, the Chick-fil-A Bowl became the best-attended non-BCS bowl for the previous decade. According to Sports Illustrated, although the bowl generated $12.3 million in profit in 2007, only $5.9 million of that was paid out to the participating schools. In October 2009, the bowl extended the ACC contract through 2013. As of 2013, the bowl had been sold out for 17 straight years, the second-longest streak behind only the Rose Bowl Game.

The Peach Bowl ascended to major-bowl status when it was added to the "New Year's Six" bowls starting with the 2014 season, assuring that it would feature major conference champions and/or prestigious runners-up. The traditional "Peach Bowl" name was reinstated following the announcement.

The Peach Bowl has donated more than $32 million to charity since 2016.

=== Notable games ===
The 1974 edition is the only Peach Bowl to have ended in a tie, as Texas Tech and Vanderbilt each were limited to two field goals in a 6–6 tie, played before the NCAA used overtime.

The 1976 edition was the first, and to date only, shutout in Peach Bowl history, as Kentucky (21 points) held North Carolina scoreless.

The January 1981 edition, following the 1980 season, was the first Peach Bowl to be held outside of December.

The 2005 edition was the first Peach Bowl to feature two teams that were top-10 ranked. LSU, ranked 10th in both major polls, defeated ninth-ranked Miami, 40–3.

The 2007 edition was the first Peach Bowl to utilize overtime, which Auburn won over Clemson, 23–20. With a 5.09 share (4.92 million households), the 2007 game was the highest-rated ESPN-broadcast bowl game of the 2007–2008 season as well as the highest rated in the game's history. The rating was also higher than two New Year's Day bowls, the Cotton and the Gator.

The 2012 edition set a new record for viewership. The New Year's Eve telecast, a 25–24 Clemson victory over LSU, averaged 8.557 million viewers (a 5.6 household coverage rating), making it ESPN's most-viewed non-BCS bowl ever.

The 2017 season matchup, played January 1, 2018, featured an undefeated UCF playing an Auburn team that had notched regular-season wins over both national championship contenders, Georgia and Alabama (the eventual 2018 College Football Playoff Champion). A 34–27 UCF victory resulted in UCF being the only undefeated team in the Football Bowl Subdivision (FBS) for the 2017 season. As such, UCF was selected as the 2017 national champions by one NCAA recognized selector and thus claims a share of the 2017 national championship.

The 2019 edition saw LSU score 63 points, a Peach Bowl record that still stands, while defeating Oklahoma (28 points) en route to the national championship.

The January 2025 edition, following the 2024 season, was the second Peach Bowl to require overtime play, with Texas defeating Arizona State, 39–31, in double-overtime.

=== Statistics ===
- Ninth-oldest bowl game in college football history.
- A then-Georgia Dome attendance record of 75,406 set in 2006 (Georgia vs. Virginia Tech).
- 17 straight sellouts (1998–2013).
- Highest-attended non-BCS bowl game.
- More than $125 million in cumulative payout (through the 2013 season).

== Game results ==
All rankings are taken from the AP poll (inaugurated in 1936), before each game was played. Italics denote a tie game.

Date played	Bowl name	Winning team		Losing team		Attendance	Venue
December 30, 1968	Peach Bowl	LSU	31	19 Florida State	27	35,545	Grant Field
December 30, 1969	Peach Bowl	19 West Virginia	14	South Carolina	3	48,452	Grant Field
December 30, 1970	Peach Bowl	8 Arizona State	48	North Carolina	26	52,126	Grant Field
December 30, 1971	Peach Bowl	17 Ole Miss	41	Georgia Tech	18	36,771	Atlanta-Fulton County Stadium
December 29, 1972	Peach Bowl	NC State	49	18 West Virginia	13	52,671	Atlanta-Fulton County Stadium
December 28, 1973	Peach Bowl	Georgia	17	18 Maryland	16	38,107	Atlanta-Fulton County Stadium
December 28, 1974	Peach Bowl	Texas Tech	6	Vanderbilt	6	31,695	Atlanta-Fulton County Stadium
December 31, 1975	Peach Bowl	West Virginia	13	NC State	10	45,134	Atlanta-Fulton County Stadium
December 31, 1976	Peach Bowl	Kentucky	21	19 North Carolina	0	54,132	Atlanta-Fulton County Stadium
December 31, 1977	Peach Bowl	NC State	24	Iowa State	14	36,733	Atlanta-Fulton County Stadium
December 25, 1978	Peach Bowl	17 Purdue	41	Georgia Tech	21	20,277	Atlanta-Fulton County Stadium
December 31, 1979	Peach Bowl	19 Baylor	24	18 Clemson	18	57,371	Atlanta-Fulton County Stadium
January 2, 1981	Peach Bowl	20 Miami (Florida)	20	Virginia Tech	10	45,384	Atlanta-Fulton County Stadium
December 31, 1981	Peach Bowl	West Virginia	26	Florida	6	37,582	Atlanta-Fulton County Stadium
December 31, 1982	Peach Bowl	Iowa	28	Tennessee	22	50,134	Atlanta-Fulton County Stadium
December 30, 1983	Peach Bowl	Florida State	28	North Carolina	3	25,648	Atlanta-Fulton County Stadium
December 31, 1984	Peach Bowl	Virginia	27	Purdue	24	41,107	Atlanta-Fulton County Stadium
December 31, 1985	Peach Bowl	Army	31	Illinois	29	29,857	Atlanta-Fulton County Stadium
December 31, 1986	Peach Bowl	Virginia Tech	25	18 NC State	24	53,668	Atlanta-Fulton County Stadium
January 2, 1988	Peach Bowl	17 Tennessee	27	Indiana	22	58,737	Atlanta-Fulton County Stadium
December 31, 1988	Peach Bowl	NC State	28	Iowa	23	44,635	Atlanta-Fulton County Stadium
December 30, 1989	Peach Bowl	Syracuse	19	Georgia	18	44,991	Atlanta-Fulton County Stadium
December 29, 1990	Peach Bowl	Auburn	27	Indiana	23	38,912	Atlanta-Fulton County Stadium
January 1, 1992	Peach Bowl	12 East Carolina	37	21 NC State	34	59,322	Atlanta-Fulton County Stadium
January 2, 1993	Peach Bowl	19 North Carolina	21	24 Mississippi State	17	69,125	Georgia Dome
December 31, 1993	Peach Bowl	24 Clemson	14	Kentucky	13	63,416	Georgia Dome
January 1, 1995	Peach Bowl	23 NC State	28	16 Mississippi State	24	64,902	Georgia Dome
December 30, 1995	Peach Bowl	18 Virginia	34	Georgia	27	70,825	Georgia Dome
December 28, 1996	Peach Bowl	17 LSU	10	Clemson	7	63,622	Georgia Dome
January 2, 1998	Peach Bowl	13 Auburn	21	Clemson	17	71,212	Georgia Dome
December 31, 1998	Peach Bowl	19 Georgia	35	13 Virginia	33	72,876	Georgia Dome
December 30, 1999	Peach Bowl	15 Mississippi State	17	Clemson	7	73,315	Georgia Dome
December 29, 2000	Peach Bowl	LSU	28	15 Georgia Tech	14	73,614	Georgia Dome
December 31, 2001	Peach Bowl	North Carolina	16	Auburn	10	71,827	Georgia Dome
December 31, 2002	Peach Bowl	20 Maryland	30	Tennessee	3	68,330	Georgia Dome
January 2, 2004	Peach Bowl	Clemson	27	6 Tennessee	14	75,125	Georgia Dome
December 31, 2004	Peach Bowl	14 Miami (Florida)	27	20 Florida	10	69,322	Georgia Dome
December 30, 2005	Peach Bowl	10 LSU	40	9 Miami (Florida)	3	65,620	Georgia Dome
December 30, 2006	Chick-fil-A Bowl	Georgia	31	14 Virginia Tech	24	75,406	Georgia Dome
December 31, 2007	Chick-fil-A Bowl	22 Auburn	23	15 Clemson	20 (OT)	74,413	Georgia Dome
December 31, 2008	Chick-fil-A Bowl	LSU	38	14 Georgia Tech	3	71,423	Georgia Dome
December 31, 2009	Chick-fil-A Bowl	12 Virginia Tech	37	Tennessee	14	73,777	Georgia Dome
December 31, 2010	Chick-fil-A Bowl	23 Florida State	26	19 South Carolina	17	72,217	Georgia Dome
December 31, 2011	Chick-fil-A Bowl	Auburn	43	Virginia	24	72,919	Georgia Dome
December 31, 2012	Chick-fil-A Bowl	14 Clemson	25	9 LSU	24	68,027	Georgia Dome
December 31, 2013	Chick-fil-A Bowl	20 Texas A&M	52	22 Duke	48	67,946	Georgia Dome
December 31, 2014	Peach Bowl	6 TCU	42	9 Ole Miss	3	65,706	Georgia Dome
December 31, 2015	Peach Bowl	14 Houston	38	9 Florida State	24	71,007	Georgia Dome
December 31, 2016^{SF}	Peach Bowl	1 Alabama	24	4 Washington	7	75,996	Georgia Dome
January 1, 2018	Peach Bowl	10 UCF	34	7 Auburn	27	71,109	Mercedes-Benz Stadium
December 29, 2018	Peach Bowl	10 Florida	41	8 Michigan	15	74,006	Mercedes-Benz Stadium
December 28, 2019^{SF}	Peach Bowl	1 LSU	63	4 Oklahoma	28	78,347	Mercedes-Benz Stadium
January 1, 2021	Peach Bowl	11 Georgia	24	6 Cincinnati	21	15,301	Mercedes-Benz Stadium
December 30, 2021	Peach Bowl	11 Michigan State	31	13 Pittsburgh	21	41,230	Mercedes-Benz Stadium
December 31, 2022^{SF}	Peach Bowl	1 Georgia	42	4 Ohio State	41	79,330	Mercedes-Benz Stadium
December 30, 2023	Peach Bowl	11 Ole Miss	38	10 Penn State	25	71,230	Mercedes-Benz Stadium
January 1, 2025^{QF}	Peach Bowl	4 Texas	39	10 Arizona State	31 (2OT)	71,105	Mercedes-Benz Stadium
January 9, 2026^{SF}	Peach Bowl	1 Indiana	56	5 Oregon	22	75,604	Mercedes-Benz Stadium

^QF Denotes College Football Playoff quarterfinal game
^SF Denotes College Football Playoff semifinal game

== Most Outstanding Players ==
Offensive and defensive Most Outstanding Players are selected for each game; from 1989 through 1998, selections were made for both teams.

The trophy is named the 'S. Truett Cathy Most Outstanding Player' award in honor of the founder of Chick-fil-A.

Game	MOP — Offense			MOP — Defense		
Game	Player	Team	Position	Player	Team	Position
1968	Mike Hillman	LSU	QB	Buddy Millican	LSU	DE
1969	Ed Williams	West Virginia	FB	Carl Crennel	West Virginia	MG
1970	Monroe Eley	Arizona State	HB	Junior Ah You	Arizona State	DE
1971	Norris Weese	Ole Miss	QB	Crowell Armstrong	Ole Miss	LB
1972	Dave Buckey	NC State	QB	George Bell	NC State	DT
1973	Louis Carter	Maryland	TB	Sylvester Boler	Georgia	LB
1974	Larry Isaac	Texas Tech	TB	Dennis Harrison	Vanderbilt	DB
1975	Dan Kendra	West Virginia	QB	Ray Marshall	West Virginia	LB
1976	Rod Stewart	Kentucky	TB	Mike Martin	Kentucky	LB
1977	Johnny Evans	NC State	QB	Richard Carter	NC State	DB
1978	Mark Herrmann	Purdue	QB	Calvin Clark	Purdue	DT
1979	Mike Brannan	Baylor	QB	Andrew Melontree	Baylor	DE
1981	Jim Kelly	Miami (Florida)	QB	Jim Burt	Miami (Florida)	MG
1981	Mickey Walczak	West Virginia	RB	Don Stemple	West Virginia	DB
1982	Chuck Long	Iowa	QB	Clay Uhlenhake	Iowa	DT
1983	Eric Thomas	Florida State	QB	Alphonso Carreker	Florida State	DT
1984	Howard Petty	Virginia	TB	Ray Daly	Virginia	CB
1985	Rob Healy	Army	QB	Peel Chronister	Army	S
1986	Erik Kramer	NC State	QB	Derrick Taylor	NC State	CB
1988	Reggie Cobb	Tennessee	TB	Van Waiters	Indiana	LB
1988	Shane Montgomery	NC State	QB	Michael Brooks	NC State	CB
1989	Michael Owens	Syracuse	RB	Terry Wooden	Syracuse	LB
1989	Rodney Hampton	Georgia	RB	Morris Lewis	Georgia	LB
1990	Stan White	Auburn	QB	Darrel Crawford	Auburn	LB
1990	Vaughn Dunbar	Indiana	RB	Mike Dumas	Indiana	FS
1992	Jeff Blake	East Carolina	QB	Robert Jones	East Carolina	LB
1992	Terry Jordan	NC State	QB	Billy Ray Haynes	NC State	DB
Jan. 1993	Natrone Means	North Carolina	RB	Bracey Walker	North Carolina	DB
Jan. 1993	Greg Plump	Mississippi State	QB	Marc Woodard	Mississippi State	LB
Dec. 1993	Emory Smith	Clemson	RB	Brentson Buckner	Clemson	DE
Dec. 1993	Pookie Jones	Kentucky	QB	Zane Beehn	Kentucky	LB
Jan. 1995	Tremayne Stephens	NC State	RB	Damien Covington; Carl Reeves	NC State	ILB; DT
Jan. 1995	Tim Rogers	Mississippi State	K	Larry Williams	Mississippi State	DL
Dec. 1995	Tiki Barber	Virginia	RB	Skeet Jones	Virginia	LB
Dec. 1995	Hines Ward	Georgia	QB	Whit Marshall	Georgia	LB
1996	Herb Tyler	LSU	QB	Anthony McFarland	LSU	DL
1996	Raymond Priester	Clemson	RB	Trevor Pryce	Clemson	LB
Jan. 1998	Dameyune Craig	Auburn	QB	Takeo Spikes	Auburn	LB
Jan. 1998	Raymond Priester	Clemson	RB	Anthony Simmons	Clemson	LB
Dec. 1998	Olandis Gary	Georgia	RB	Champ Bailey	Georgia	DB
Dec. 1998	Aaron Brooks	Virginia	QB	Wali Rainer	Virginia	LB
1999	Wayne Madkin	Mississippi State	QB	Keith Adams	Clemson	LB
2000	Rohan Davey	LSU	QB	Bradie James	LSU	LB
2001	Ronald Curry	North Carolina	QB	Ryan Sims	North Carolina	DL
2002	Scott McBrien	Maryland	QB	E.J. Henderson	Maryland	LB
Jan. 2004	Chad Jasmin	Clemson	RB	Leroy Hill	Clemson	LB
Dec. 2004	Roscoe Parrish	Miami (Florida)	WR	Devin Hester	Miami (Florida)	CB
2005	Matt Flynn	LSU	QB	Jim Morris	Miami (Florida)	DT
2006	Matthew Stafford	Georgia	QB	Tony Taylor	Georgia	LB
2007	C. J. Spiller	Clemson	RB	Pat Sims	Auburn	DT
2008	Jordan Jefferson	LSU	QB	Perry Riley	LSU	LB
2009	Ryan Williams	Virginia Tech	RB	Cody Grimm	Virginia Tech	LB
2010	Chris Thompson	Florida State	RB	Greg Reid	Florida State	CB
2011	Onterio McCalebb	Auburn	RB	Chris Davis	Auburn	CB
2012	Tajh Boyd	Clemson	QB	Kevin Minter	LSU	LB
2013	Johnny Manziel	Texas A&M	QB	Toney Hurd Jr.	Texas A&M	DB
2014	Trevone Boykin	TCU	QB	James McFarland	TCU	DE
2015	Greg Ward, Jr.	Houston	QB	William Jackson III	Houston	CB
2016	Bo Scarbrough	Alabama	RB	Ryan Anderson	Alabama	LB
Jan. 2018	McKenzie Milton	UCF	QB	Shaquem Griffin	UCF	LB
Dec. 2018	Feleipe Franks	Florida	QB	Chauncey Gardner-Johnson	Florida	DB
2019	Joe Burrow	LSU	QB	K'Lavon Chaisson	LSU	LB
Jan. 2021	Jack Podlesny	Georgia	K	Azeez Ojulari	Georgia	LB
Dec. 2021	Jayden Reed	Michigan State	WR	Cal Haladay	Michigan State	LB
2022	Stetson Bennett	Georgia	QB	Javon Bullard	Georgia	DB
2023	Caden Prieskorn	Ole Miss	TE	Jared Ivey	Ole Miss	DE
2025	Cam Skattebo	Arizona State	RB	Jahdae Barron	Texas	DB
2026	Fernando Mendoza	Indiana	QB	D'Angelo Ponds	Indiana	CB

== Most appearances ==
Updated through the January 2026 edition (58 games, 116 total appearances).

Teams with multiple appearances

Rank	Team	Appearances	Record	Win pct.
1	Clemson	8	3–5	.375
T2	LSU	7	6–1	.857
T2	Georgia	7	5–2	.714
T2	NC State	7	4–3	.571
5	Auburn	6	4–2	.667
T6	North Carolina	5	2–3	.400
T6	Tennessee	5	1–4	.200
T8	West Virginia	4	3–1	.750
T8	Florida State	4	2–2	.500
T8	Virginia	4	2–2	.500
T8	Virginia Tech	4	2–2	.500
T8	Georgia Tech	4	0–4	.000

Rank	Team	Appearances	Record	Win pct.
T13	Miami (FL)	3	2–1	.667
T13	Ole Miss	3	2–1	.667
T13	Florida	3	1–2	.333
T13	Mississippi State	3	1–2	.333
T13	Indiana	3	1–2	.333
T18	Arizona State	2	1–1	.500
T18	Iowa	2	1–1	.500
T18	Kentucky	2	1–1	.500
T18	Maryland	2	1–1	.500
T18	Purdue	2	1–1	.500
T18	South Carolina	2	0–2	.000

Teams with a single appearance

Won (11): Alabama, Army, Baylor, East Carolina, Houston, Michigan State, Syracuse, TCU, Texas, Texas A&M, UCF
Lost (11): Cincinnati, Duke, Illinois, Iowa State, Michigan, Ohio State, Oklahoma, Oregon, Penn State, Pittsburgh, Washington
Tied (2): Texas Tech, Vanderbilt

== Appearances by conference ==
Updated through the January 2026 edition (58 games, 116 total appearances).

Conference	Record					Appearances by season		
Conference	Games	W	L	T	Win pct.	Won	Lost	Tied
SEC	41	24	16	1	.598	1968, 1971, 1973, 1976, 1987*, 1990, 1996, 1997*, 1998, 1999, 2000, 2005, 2006, 2007, 2008, 2011, 2013, 2016, 2018, 2019, 2020*, 2022, 2023, 2024*	1981, 1982, 1989, 1992*, 1993, 1994*, 1995, 2001, 2002, 2003*, 2004, 2009, 2010, 2012, 2014, 2017*	1974
ACC	37	15	22	0	.405	1972, 1977, 1984, 1988, 1992*, 1993, 1994*, 1995, 2001, 2002, 2003*, 2004, 2009, 2010, 2012	1969, 1970, 1973, 1975, 1976, 1979, 1983, 1986, 1991*, 1996, 1997*, 1998, 1999, 2000, 2005, 2006, 2007, 2008, 2011, 2013, 2015, 2021	
Independents	14	9	5	0	.643	1969, 1975, 1980*, 1981, 1983, 1985, 1986, 1989, 1991*	1968, 1971, 1972, 1978, 1980*	
Big Ten	13	4	9	0	.308	1978, 1982, 2021, 2025*	1984, 1985, 1987*, 1988, 1990, 2018, 2022, 2023, 2025*	
American	3	2	1	0	.667	2015, 2017*	2020*	
Big 12	3	1	2	0	.333	2014	2019, 2024*	
SWC	2	1	0	1	.750	1979		1974
WAC	1	1	0	0	1.000	1970		
Big Eight	1	0	1	0	.000		1977	
Pac-12	1	0	1	0	.000		2016	

- Games marked with an asterisk (*) were played in January of the following calendar year.
- Records are based on a team's conference affiliation at the time the game was played.
- Conferences that are defunct or no longer active in FBS are marked in italics.
  - SWC and Big Eight appearances were prior to the 1996 merger of four Southwest Conference schools and eight Big Eight schools, which created the Big 12.
  - The WAC no longer sponsors FBS football.
- Independent appearances: Army (1985), East Carolina (1991*), Florida State (1968, 1983), Georgia Tech (1971, 1978), Miami (FL) (1980*), Syracuse (1989), Virginia Tech (1980*, 1986), West Virginia (1969, 1972, 1975, 1981)
- The game following the 1980 season, played in January 1981, was contested between two independent programs.
- The game following the 2025 season, played in January 2026, was contested between two Big Ten programs.

== Game records ==
Team	Record, Team vs. Opponent	Year
Most points scored (both teams)	100, Texas A&M (52) vs. Duke (48)	2013
Most points scored (one team)	63, LSU (63) vs. Oklahoma (28)	2019
Most points scored (losing team)	48, Duke (48) vs. Texas A&M (52)	2013
Fewest points scored	12, Vanderbilt (6) vs. Texas Tech (6)	1974
Fewest points allowed	0, Kentucky (21) vs. North Carolina (0)	1976
Largest margin of victory	39, TCU (42) vs. Ole Miss (3)	2014
Total yards	693, LSU vs. Oklahoma	2019
Rushing yards	356, West Virginia vs. South Carolina	1969
Passing yards	493, LSU vs. Oklahoma	2019
First downs	32, Clemson vs. LSU	2012
Fewest yards allowed	105, West Virginia vs. Florida	1981
Fewest rushing yards allowed	5, Virginia Tech vs. Tennessee	2009
Fewest passing yards allowed	3, South Carolina vs. West Virginia	1969
Individual	Record, Player, Team	Year
All-purpose yards	469, Hines Ward (Georgia)	1995
Touchdowns (all-purpose)	8, Joe Burrow (LSU)	2019
Rushing yards	208, Ed Williams (West Virginia)	1969
Rushing touchdowns	3, 7 players	mult.
Passing yards	493, Joe Burrow (LSU)	2019
Passing touchdowns	7, Joe Burrow (LSU)	2019
Receiving yards	227, Justin Jefferson (LSU)	2019
Receiving touchdowns	4, Justin Jefferson (LSU)	2019
Tackles		
Sacks		
Interceptions	3, Michael Brooks (NC State)	1988
Long Plays	Record, Player, Team	Year
Touchdown run	83 yds., C. J. Spiller (Clemson)	2007
Touchdown pass	82 yds., Mike Groh to Demetrius Allen (Virginia)	1995
Kickoff return	83 yds., Demetrius Allen (Virginia)	1995
Punt return	79 yds., Steve Suter (Maryland)	2002
Interception return	78 yds., Cal Haladay (Michigan State)	2021
Fumble return	10 yds., Jason Ferguson (Georgia)	1995
Punt	67 yds., Damon Duval (Auburn)	2001
Field goal	53 yds., shared by: Colt David (LSU); Jack Podlesny (Georgia)	2008; 2021
Miscellaneous	Record, Team vs. Team	Year
Game Attendance	79,330, Georgia vs. Ohio State	2022

== Battle for Bowl Week ==
Battle for Bowl Week has the teams compete in events during the week leading up to the game. Events in 2021 included a basketball challenge and go-kart racing. From 2011 to 2023, the winner of the Battle for Bowl Week won the game eight of thirteen times.

Year	Winner
2010	Florida State
2011	Auburn Tigers
2012	Clemson Tigers
2013	Texas A&M
2014	TCU
2015	Houston
2016	Washington
2017	Auburn
2018	Michigan
2019	Oklahoma
2021	Michigan State
2022	Ohio State
2023	Ole Miss

== See also ==
- List of college bowl games
