= Roman Reigns =

American professional wrestler and actor (born 1985)

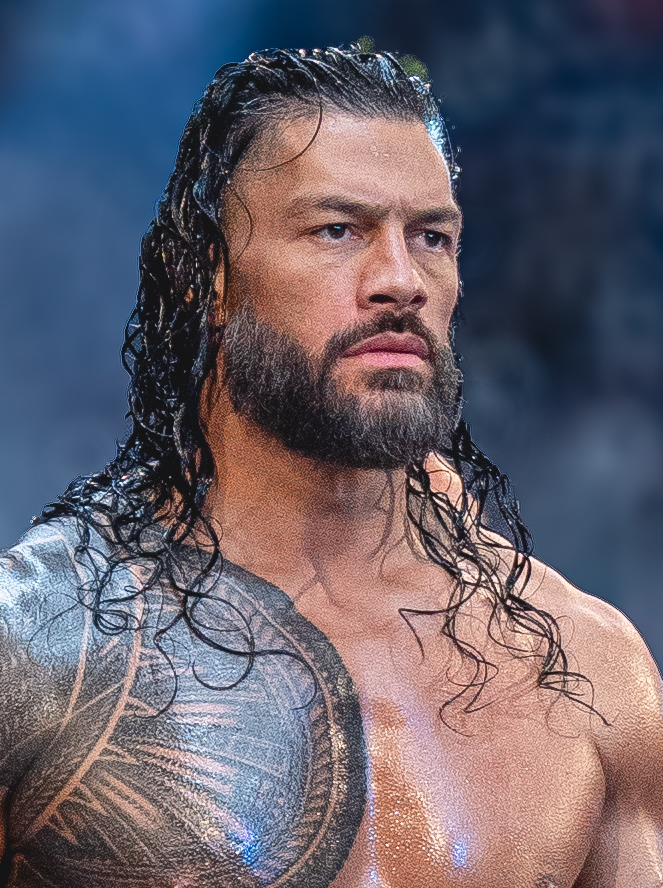
- Reigns in 2025
- Born: Leati Joseph Anoaʻi; May 25, 1985 (age 41); Pensacola, Florida, U.S.
- Occupations: Professional wrestler; actor; football player
- Spouse: Galina Becker (m. 2014)
- Children: 5
- Father: Sika Anoaʻi
- Family: Anoaʻi
- Professional wrestling career
- Ring name(s): Leakee; Roman Leakee; Roman Reigns
- Billed height: 6 ft 3 in (191 cm)
- Billed weight: 265 lb (120 kg)
- Billed from: Pensacola, Florida
- Trained by: Steve Keirn
- Debut: August 19, 2010
- Football career

No. 99
- Position: Defensive tackle

Personal information
- Listed height: 6 ft 3 in (1.91 m)
- Listed weight: 280 lb (127 kg)

Career information
- High school: Escambia (Pensacola)
- College: Georgia Tech (2003–2006)
- NFL draft: 2007: undrafted

Career history
- Minnesota Vikings (2007)*; Jacksonville Jaguars (2007)*; Edmonton Eskimos (2008)
- * Offseason or practice squad member only

Awards and highlights
- First-team All-ACC (2006)

Career CFL statistics
- Tackles: 9
- Knockdowns: 0
- Sacks: 0
- Forced fumbles: 1

Signature
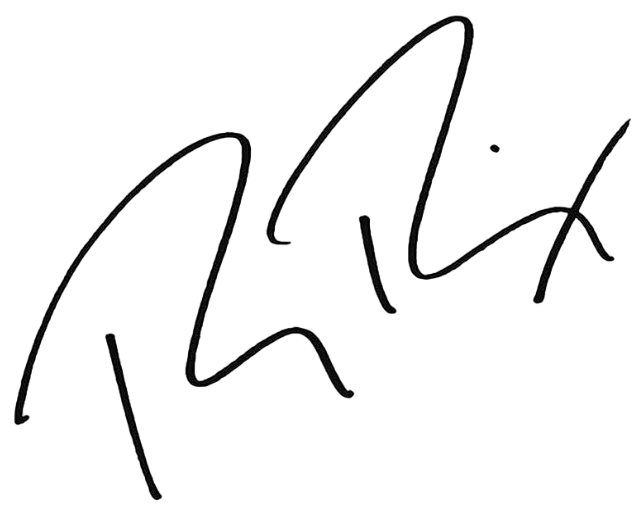

Leati Joseph "Joe" Anoaʻi (Samoan: [anoˈaʔi]; born May 25, 1985), better known by his ring name Roman Reigns, is an American professional wrestler, actor, and former football player. As a wrestler, he has been signed to WWE since 2010, where he performs on the Raw brand and is the current World Heavyweight Champion in his first reign. He is also the leader of The Bloodline stable. Reigns' 1,316-day reign as WWE Universal Champion is the longest reign of the title's history, the fourth longest world title reign in WWE history, and the longest championship reign recognized by the company since 1988. (Note: WWE also acknowledges the NWA (pre-1993) and AWA titles as world championships, recognizing Reigns as the eight-longest reigning world champion in professional wrestling history.)

After playing American college football for Georgia Tech, Anoaʻi started a professional football career with brief off-season stints with the Minnesota Vikings and Jacksonville Jaguars of the National Football League (NFL) in 2007. He played a full season for the Canadian Football League's (CFL) Edmonton Eskimos in 2008 before his release and retirement from football. A member of the Anoaʻi wrestling family, Anoaʻi was signed by WWE in 2010 and made his main roster debut under the ring name Roman Reigns in 2012 as a member of The Shield alongside Dean Ambrose and Seth Rollins; with Rollins, Reigns held the WWE Tag Team Championship once. The trio teamed together until disbanding in 2014, after which, Reigns entered singles competition.

From 2014 to 2020, WWE positioned Reigns as a heroic character and attempted to establish him as their next "face of the company", which was met with intense disapproval by audiences and critics. During this period, Reigns won numerous championships and accomplishments, including winning the WWE Championship three times, the WWE Universal Championship once, and winning the Royal Rumble in 2015. After a hiatus, Reigns was repackaged as a villainous character between 2020 and 2024, which was generally met with acclaim by audiences and critics. Reigns then won his second Universal Championship and fourth WWE Championship, holding both simultaneously as the Undisputed WWE Universal Championship; upon losing the Undisputed title, the Universal Championship was retired with Reigns recognized as its final champion. (Note: WWE had originally listed Cody Rhodes as both WWE and Universal Champion until April 20, 2025, when he lost the Undisputed title to John Cena. Upon Rhodes's defeat, the official title history for the Universal Championship was amended, removing Rhodes and officially recognizing Reigns as the final champion with the title's retirement being his loss at WrestleMania XL.) In 2026, Reigns won the Royal Rumble match for a second time, and, at WrestleMania 42 won the World Heavyweight Championship.

Reigns has headlined numerous WWE pay-per-view and livestreaming events, including WWE's flagship event, WrestleMania, a record 11 times. Reigns holds the joint-record for most eliminations in a Survivor Series match (4) and is also WWE's 28th Triple Crown Champion and 17th Grand Slam Champion. He was also ranked at No. 1 in Pro Wrestling Illustrated's annual PWI 500 list of the top 500 singles wrestlers in 2016 and 2022, and was named Wrestler of the Year by Sports Illustrated in 2021.

== Early life ==
Leati Joseph Anoaʻi was born on May 25, 1985, in Pensacola, Florida, to Sika Anoaʻi and Patricia Hooker. His father was of Samoan descent and his mother is of Sicilian Italian ancestry. Both his father and his brother Rosey were professional wrestlers.

As a member of the Anoaʻi wrestling family, his cousins include The Tonga Kid, Rikishi, Umaga, and Yokozuna, while his first cousins once removed include The Usos and Solo Sikoa.

Being raised in a Catholic family, Anoaʻi attended Pensacola Catholic High School before transferring to Escambia High School. He then attended the Georgia Institute of Technology in Atlanta, where he played college football for the Yellow Jackets. He graduated with a bachelor's degree from Georgia Tech, majoring in management.

== Football career ==
Pre-draft measurables
| Height | Weight | 40-yard dash | 10-yard split | 20-yard split | Three-cone drill | Vertical jump | Broad jump |
|---|---|---|---|---|---|---|---|
| 6 ft 2 5/8 in (1.90 m) | 303 lb (137 kg) | 4.91 s | 1.61 s | 2.83 s | 7.29 s | 34.0 in (0.86 m) | 9 ft 5 in (2.87 m) |
All values from Pro Day

Anoaʻi played football for three years at Pensacola Catholic High School and one year at Escambia High School; in his senior year, he was named Defensive Player of the Year by the Pensacola News Journal. He played his college football career at Georgia Tech along with future Hall of Famer Calvin Johnson. Anoaʻi was a three-year starter beginning in his sophomore year and was also one of the team captains as a senior. He earned first-team All-Atlantic Coast Conference honors in 2006 after recording 40 tackles, two recovered fumbles and 4.5 sacks.

After going undrafted in the 2007 NFL draft, Anoaʻi was signed by the Minnesota Vikings in May 2007. He was diagnosed with leukemia after his team physical and was released later that month. The Jacksonville Jaguars signed him in August 2007, only to release Anoaʻi less than a week later before the start of the 2007 NFL season. In 2008, he was signed by the Edmonton Eskimos of the Canadian Football League (CFL). Wearing the number 99, Anoaʻi played for one season with the Eskimos, featuring in five games, of which he started three. Anoaʻi's most notable game came against the Hamilton Tiger-Cats in September, where he tied for the team lead with five tackles and had a forced fumble. Anoaʻi was released by the Eskimos on November 10, and proceeded to retire from professional football.

== Professional wrestling career ==
=== World Wrestling Entertainment/WWE ===
==== Developmental territories (2010–2012) ====
Anoaʻi signed a contract with WWE in 2010 and was later assigned to their developmental territory Florida Championship Wrestling (FCW). He made his televised debut on August 19, 2010, using the ring name Roman Leakee, in a 15-man battle royal, which was won by Alex Riley. On the January 16, 2011, episode of FCW, Leakee was a competitor in a 30-man Grand Royal, but was eliminated. Later that year, Leakee formed a tag team with Donny Marlow and the pair unsuccessfully challenged Calvin Raines and Big E Langston for the FCW Florida Tag Team Championship on July 8.

In January 2012, Leakee pinned FCW Florida Heavyweight Champion Leo Kruger in a non-title match. On the February 5 episode of FCW, he defeated Dean Ambrose and Seth Rollins in a triple threat match to become the number one contender to the FCW Florida Heavyweight Championship, but failed to win the championship from Kruger the following week. In June, Leakee won the FCW Florida Tag Team Championship with Mike Dalton and would drop the titles to CJ Parker and Jason Jordan the following month.

After WWE rebranded FCW to NXT in August 2012, Anoaʻi, with the new ring name Roman Reigns and a villainous character, made his debut on the October 31 episode of NXT by defeating CJ Parker.

==== The Shield (2012–2014) ====
Reigns made his main roster debut on November 18, 2012, at the Survivor Series pay-per-view alongside Dean Ambrose and Seth Rollins, attacking Ryback during the triple threat main event for the WWE Championship, allowing CM Punk to pin John Cena and retain the title. The trio declared themselves The Shield, vowed to rally against "injustice" and denied working for Punk, but routinely emerged from the crowd to attack Punk's adversaries. This led to a six-man tag team Tables, Ladders, and Chairs match at TLC: Tables, Ladders & Chairs on December 16, where The Shield defeated Team Hell No (Daniel Bryan and Kane) and Ryback in their debut match. They continued to aid Punk after TLC, both on Raw and at the Royal Rumble on January 27, 2013 It was revealed on the January 28 episode of Raw that Punk and his manager Paul Heyman had been paying The Shield and Brad Maddox to work for them.

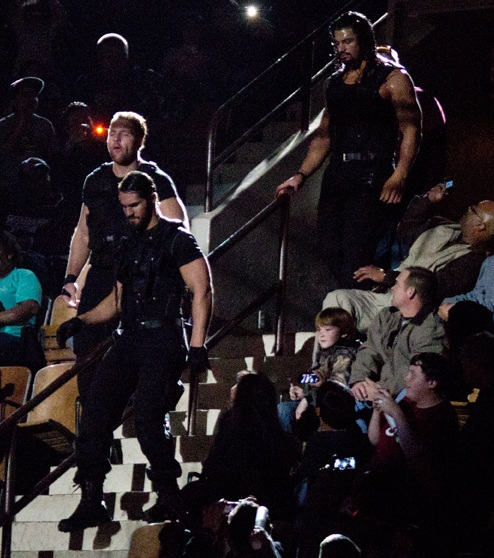
Reigns (back) made his WWE debut as a member of The Shield in November 2012.

The Shield then quietly ended their association with Punk while beginning a feud with Cena, Ryback and Sheamus, who they defeated on February 17 at Elimination Chamber. On April 7, they defeated Sheamus, Randy Orton and Big Show at WrestleMania 29. The following night on Raw, The Shield attempted to attack The Undertaker, but they were stopped by Team Hell No. This set up a six-man tag team match on the April 22 episode of Raw, which The Shield won. On the May 13 episode of Raw, The Shield's undefeated streak in televised six-man tag team matches ended in a disqualification loss in a six-man elimination tag team match against Cena, Kane and Bryan.

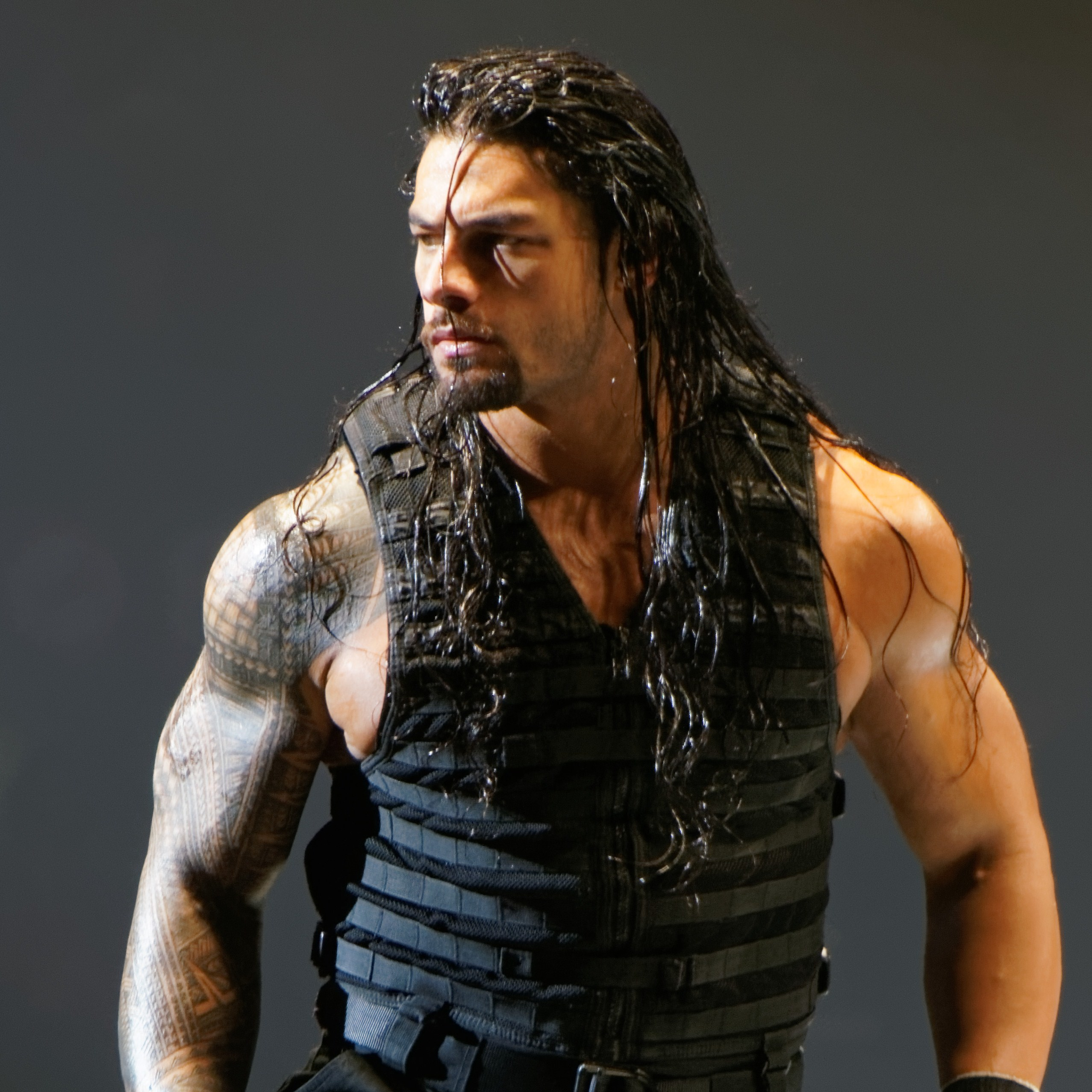
Reigns in November 2013

On May 19 at Extreme Rules, Reigns and Rollins defeated Team Hell No in a tornado tag team match to win the WWE Tag Team Championship. On the June 14 episode of SmackDown, The Shield suffered their first decisive loss in televised six-man tag team matches against Team Hell No and Randy Orton when Bryan made Rollins submit. Reigns and Rollins defeated Bryan and Orton at Payback on June 16 to retain the WWE Tag Team Championship. In August, The Shield began working for chief operating officer Triple H and The Authority. They retained their titles against The Usos at Money in the Bank on July 14 and The Prime Time Players (Darren Young and Titus O'Neil) at Night of Champions on September 15. At Battleground on October 6, the recently (kayfabe) fired Cody Rhodes and Goldust reclaimed their jobs by defeating Rollins and Reigns in a non-title match. Reigns and Rollins lost the titles to Rhodes and Goldust in a no disqualification match on the October 14 episode of Raw, after interference from Big Show and failed to regain them in a triple threat tag team match at Hell in a Cell on October 27.

At Survivor Series on November 24, The Shield teamed with Antonio Cesaro and Jack Swagger to face Rey Mysterio, The Usos, Rhodes and Goldust in a traditional Survivor Series match; Reigns won the match for his team. At TLC: Tables, Ladders & Chairs on December 15, The Shield lost to CM Punk in a 3-on-1 handicap match after Reigns accidentally speared Ambrose. At the Royal Rumble on January 26, 2014, Reigns entered the Royal Rumble match at number 15 and eliminated 12 competitors (a record that was later broken by Braun Strowman in 2018), ultimately finishing as the runner-up after being lastly eliminated by Batista. The next night on Raw, The Shield competed in a six-man tag team match against Daniel Bryan, Sheamus and John Cena, with all three members of the winning team qualifying for the Elimination Chamber match for the WWE World Heavyweight Championship, which The Shield lost via disqualification after The Wyatt Family interfered and attacked Cena, Bryan and Sheamus. The Shield lost to the Wyatt Family on February 24 at Elimination Chamber after Ambrose abandoned the match mid-way through.

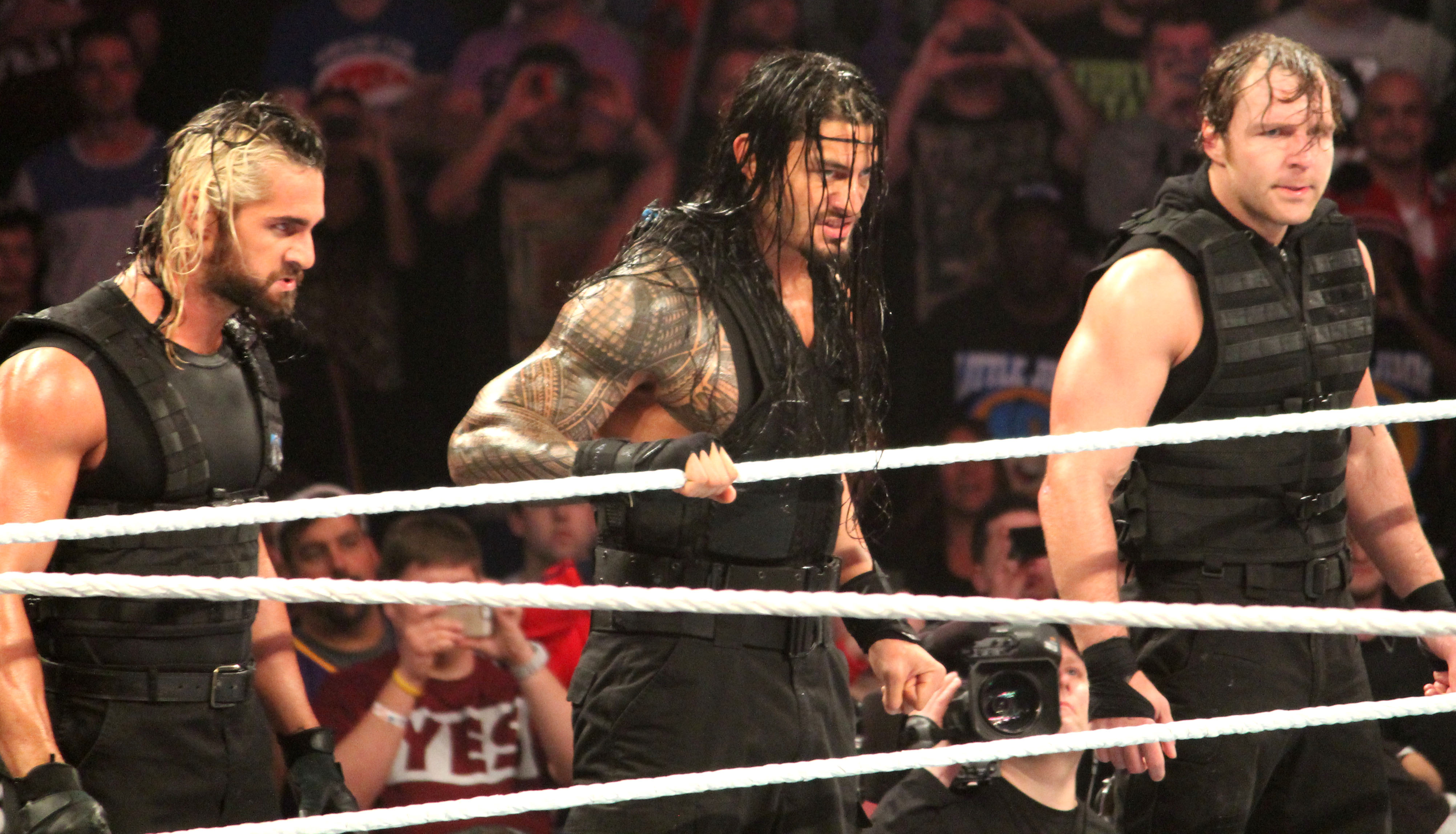
The Shield in April 2014

In March, The Shield began a feud with Kane, turning face in the process. At WrestleMania XXX on April 6, The Shield defeated Kane and The New Age Outlaws (Billy Gunn and Road Dogg). The feud with Kane also prompted The Shield to sever ties with Triple H, who reformed Evolution to counteract them. The Shield defeated Evolution at both Extreme Rules on May 4 and Payback on June 1 in a No Holds Barred elimination match, in which no members of The Shield were eliminated. The following night on Raw, Rollins turned on The Shield and aligned himself with Triple H and The Authority.

==== Controversial rise to main event status (2014–2015) ====
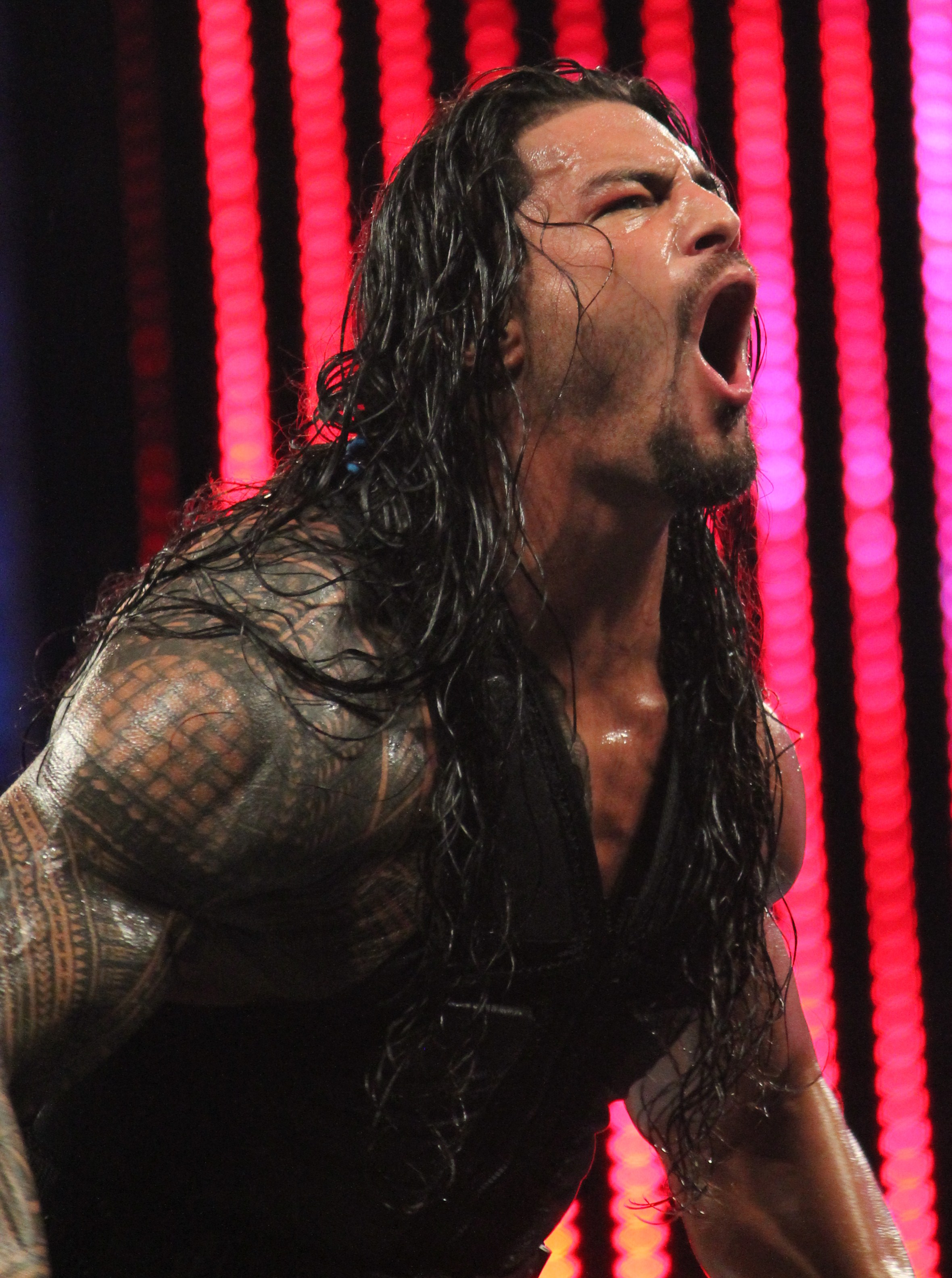
Reigns in April 2014

Reigns then embarked in singles competition and was quickly placed into world title contention. After winning a battle royal, Reigns was inserted into a ladder match for the vacant WWE World Heavyweight Championship at Money in the Bank on June 29, which was won by John Cena. At Battleground on July 20, Reigns again challenged for the title in a fatal four-way match involving Cena, Kane, and Randy Orton, which Cena again won. Following the event, Reigns began a feud with Orton and defeated him at SummerSlam on August 17 in his singles debut match on pay-per-view.

The next month, a match was set up between Reigns and Rollins for Night of Champions on September 21, but Reigns developed a legitimate incarcerated hernia which required surgery prior to the event. As a result of Reigns being unable to compete, Rollins was declared the winner via forfeit. Reigns returned on the December 8 episode of Raw, accepting a Slammy Award for "Superstar of the Year". At TLC: Tables, Ladders & Chairs on December 14, Reigns interfered during Rollins's match with John Cena, attacking Rollins and Big Show. This started a feud between Reigns and Big Show, which saw Reigns defeat him multiple times by countout and disqualification.

On January 25, Reigns won the 2015 Royal Rumble match after lastly eliminating Rusev, therefore granting him a WWE World Heavyweight Championship match at WrestleMania 31. After his victory, Reigns was booed heavily by the crowd, despite portraying a heroic character. On the February 2 episode of Raw, Reigns suffered his first pinfall loss in singles competition on the main roster when Big Show defeated him after interference from Rollins. Reigns successfully defended his WrestleMania title shot against Daniel Bryan at Fastlane on February 22. At WrestleMania 31 on March 29, Seth Rollins cashed in his Money in the Bank contract while Reigns's main event match with Brock Lesnar was in progress, turning it into a triple threat match, which Reigns lost when he was pinned by Rollins. After defeating Big Show in a Last Man Standing match on April 26 at Extreme Rules, Reigns failed to win the title from Rollins in a fatal four-way match also involving Orton and Ambrose on May 17 at Payback.

"Reigns was a greener-than-grass wrestler who WWE identified as the Face of the Performance Center Machine – taking raw talent without the "bad habits" from the independents and trying to manufacture a WrestleMania Main-Eventer".

— James Caldwell of the Pro Wrestling Torch Newsletter in February 2015 on Reigns's background compared to that of his Shield teammates

At Money in the Bank on June 14, Reigns competed in his first Money in the Bank ladder match, but lost after Bray Wyatt interfered and attacked him. Reigns lost to Wyatt on July 17 at Battleground after interference from Luke Harper. He enlisted the help of Ambrose in order to take on the reformed Wyatt Family, defeating Wyatt and Harper at SummerSlam on August 23. The following night on Raw, Reigns and Ambrose were attacked by Wyatt's new ally, the debuting Braun Strowman. On September 20, at Night of Champions, Reigns, Ambrose and Chris Jericho were defeated by Wyatt, Harper and Strowman. The feud between Reigns and Wyatt ended in a Hell in a Cell match at the titular event on October 25, which Reigns won.

==== WWE Champion (2015–2016) ====
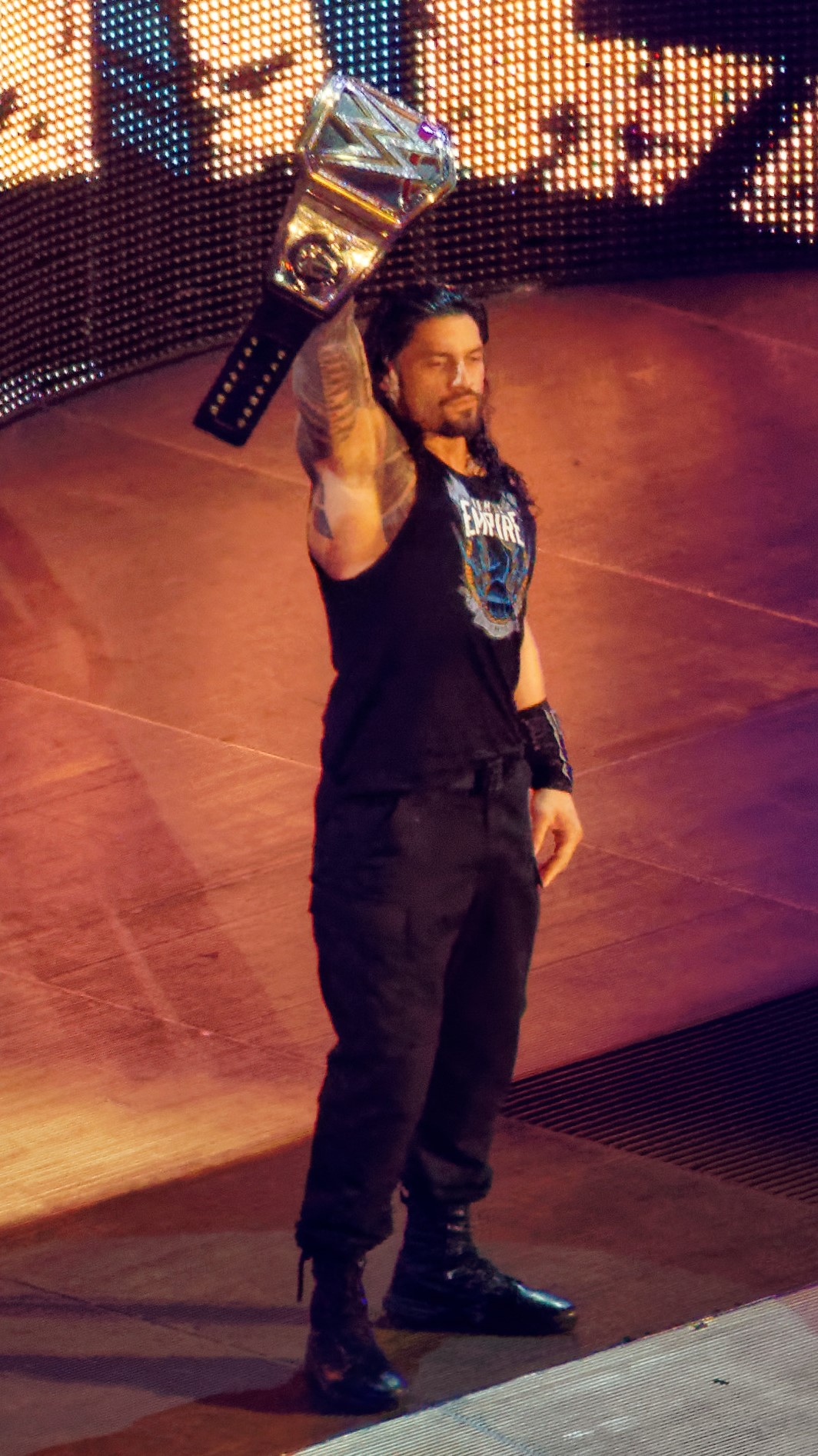
Reigns in his third reign as WWE World Heavyweight Champion in April 2016

On the October 26 episode of Raw, Reigns defeated Alberto Del Rio, Dolph Ziggler, and Kevin Owens in a fatal four-way match to become the number one contender for the WWE World Heavyweight Championship. However, champion Seth Rollins legitimately injured his knee on November 4 and vacated the title the following day, which led to a tournament to crown a new champion. Reigns defeated Big Show in the first round, Cesaro in the quarterfinals, Del Rio in the semifinals, and Dean Ambrose in the finals at Survivor Series on November 22 to win the WWE World Heavyweight Championship for the first time. Immediately afterwards, Sheamus cashed in his Money in the Bank contract and defeated Reigns, thus ending Reigns's reign after only five minutes. On December 13, Reigns failed to regain the title from Sheamus in a Tables, Ladders and Chairs match at TLC: Tables, Ladders & Chairs following interference by The League of Nations (Del Rio and Rusev), attacking Triple H in anger after the match. The next night on Raw, Vince McMahon granted Reigns a title rematch against Sheamus, under the stipulation that if Reigns lost, he would be forced to retire. Reigns defeated Sheamus to regain the WWE World Heavyweight Championship despite interferences from McMahon, Del Rio and Rusev.

Reigns successfully defended his championship against Sheamus on the January 4 episode of Raw, after which he was forced by McMahon to defend it in the 2016 Royal Rumble match on January 24, 2016. In the match, Reigns lost the championship after being eliminated by eventual winner Triple H. At Fastlane on February 22, Reigns defeated Brock Lesnar and Ambrose in a triple threat match to receive a WWE World Heavyweight Championship match against Triple H at WrestleMania 32 on April 3, where he defeated Triple H in the main event to become the WWE World Heavyweight Champion for a third time. Reigns defeated AJ Styles to retain the championship at Payback on May 1 and at Extreme Rules in an Extreme Rules match on May 22, after which he was attacked by a returning Seth Rollins.

The following night on Raw, Shane McMahon scheduled a match between Reigns and Rollins for the title at Money in the Bank. At the event on June 19, Reigns lost to Rollins, marking his first clean loss on the main roster and ending his reign at 77 days. On June 21, Anoaʻi was legitimately suspended by WWE for 30 days due to violating the WWE Wellness Program, WWE's internal drug testing program. Pro Wrestling Torch and TheWrap reported that WWE knew of Anoaʻi's violation before the event, leading to Reigns being scripted to lose his world title at the event.

On July 19 at the 2016 WWE draft, Reigns was drafted to the Raw brand. Despite Reigns's suspension, WWE continued to advertise Reigns as part of the Battleground main event and acknowledged Reigns's suspension on television. At Battleground on July 24, Reigns made his televised return, facing Rollins and Dean Ambrose for the now-renamed WWE Championship, which Ambrose won. The following night on Raw, Reigns lost to the debuting Finn Bálor in a qualifying match for the newly announced WWE Universal Championship against Rollins at SummerSlam.

==== Grand Slam Champion (2016–2018) ====
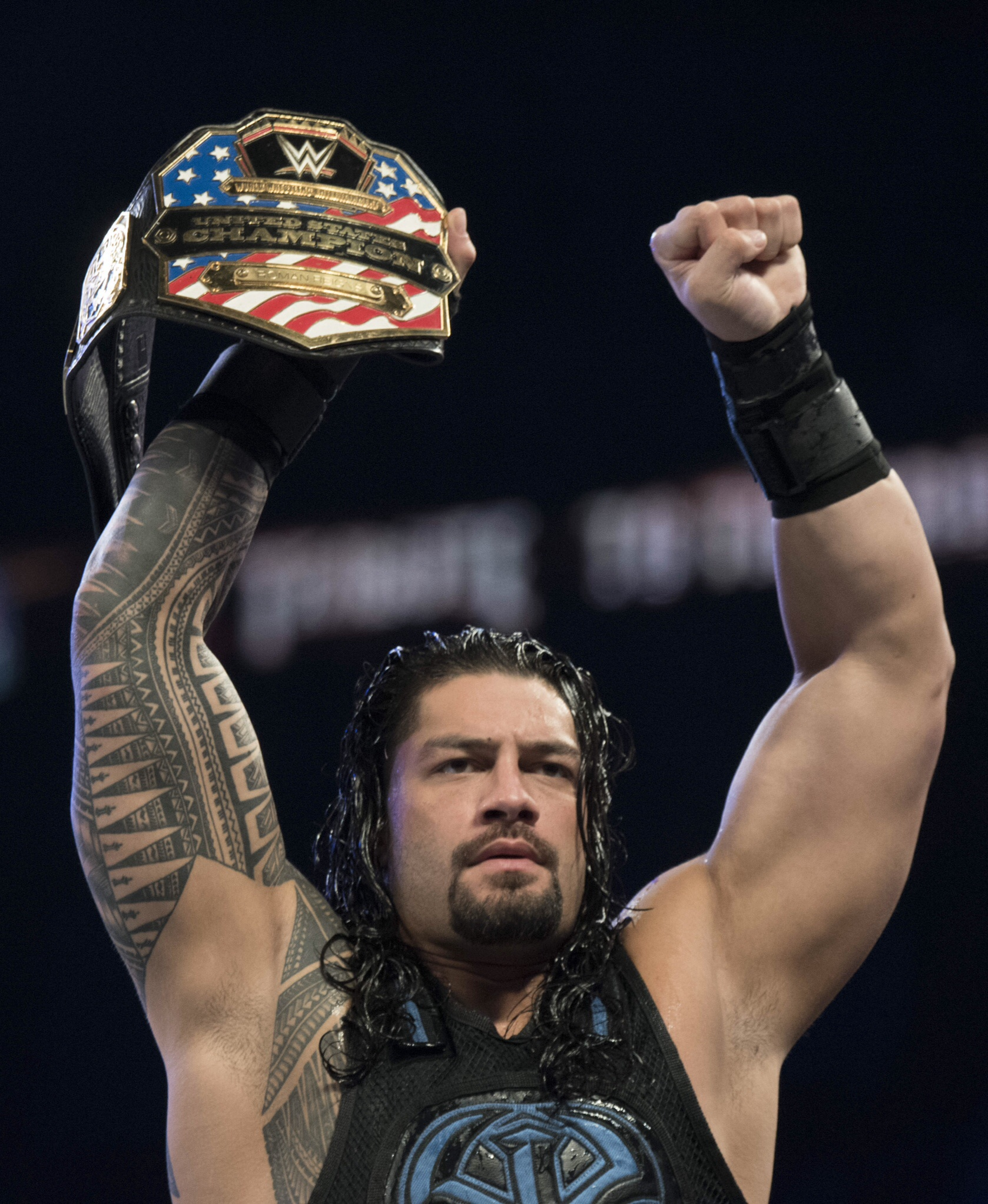
After feuding for the WWE World Heavyweight Championship, Reigns was drafted to Raw and would win the United States Championship in September 2016.

In August, Reigns began a feud with United States Champion Rusev, provoking a title match between the two at SummerSlam on August 21, where they brawled before the match began, leading to the match being declared a no contest. In a rematch at Clash of Champions on September 25, Reigns defeated Rusev to win the United States Championship, and retained the title against Rusev in a Hell in a Cell match at the titular event on October 30 to end their feud. At Survivor Series on November 20, Reigns made up part of Team Raw alongside Braun Strowman, Chris Jericho, Kevin Owens and Rollins in a losing effort to Team SmackDown. At Roadblock: End of the Line on December 18, Reigns faced Owens for the Universal Championship, but lost via disqualification when Jericho attacked Owens to prevent Reigns from winning the match and the title. On the January 9, 2017, episode of Raw, Reigns lost the United States Championship to Jericho and Owens in a handicap match, ending his reign at 106 days. At Royal Rumble on January 29, Reigns lost to Owens in a no disqualification rematch with Jericho being suspended above the ring in a shark cage after interference from Strowman.

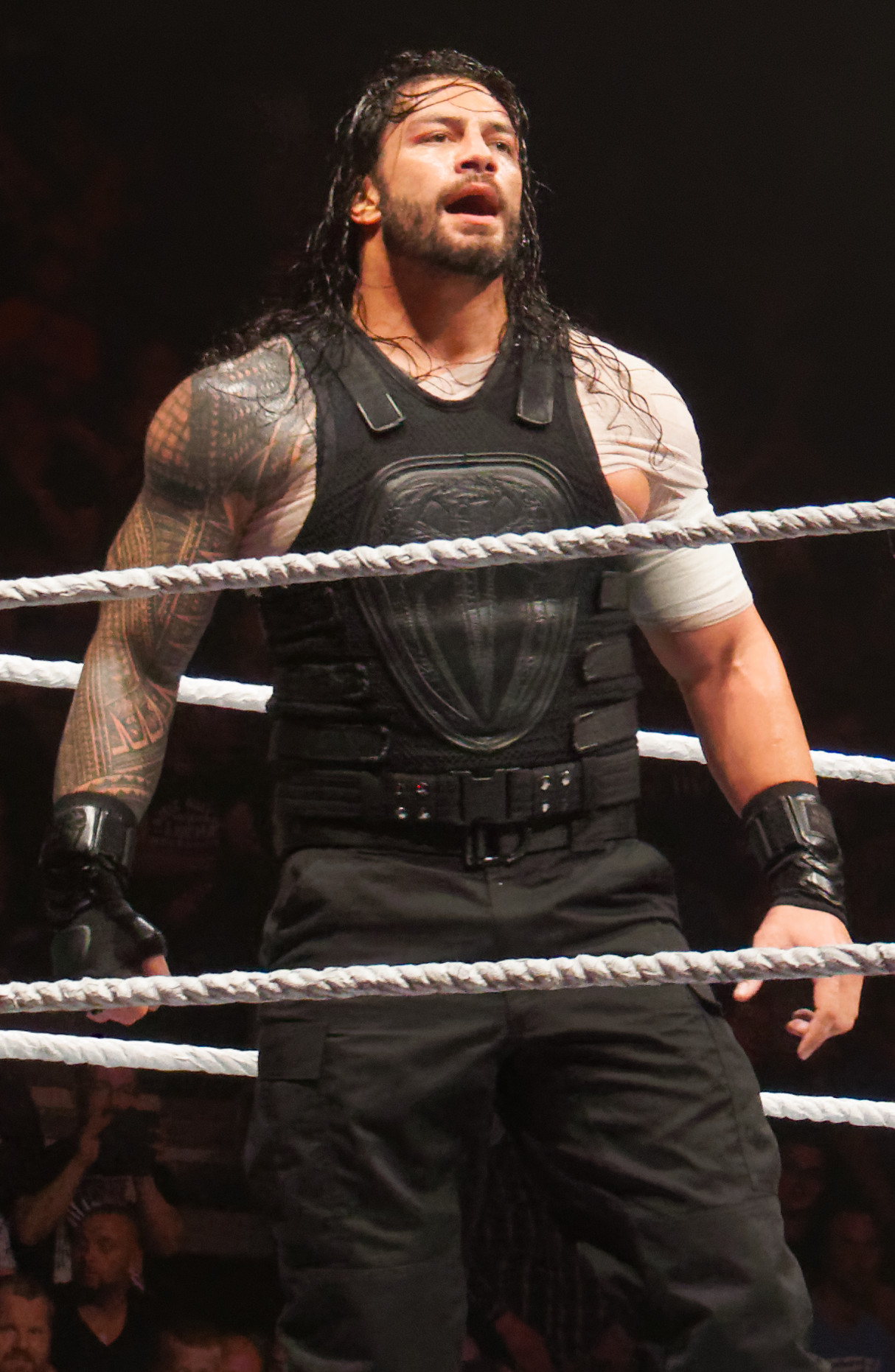
Reigns in May 2017

Later in the event, Reigns entered the Royal Rumble match at number 30, eliminating Bray Wyatt, Jericho, and The Undertaker before lastly being eliminated by Randy Orton. At Fastlane on March 5, Reigns defeated Strowman, giving Strowman his first pinfall loss on the main roster. The following night on Raw, Reigns was chokeslammed by The Undertaker after they joined forces to attack Strowman. This led to a No Holds Barred match between the two at WrestleMania 33 on April 2, which Reigns won in his third consecutive WrestleMania main event. The next night on Raw, Reigns opened the show to ten minutes of severe boos and chants from the crowd, attempting to stop him from speaking, before simply stating "This is my yard now" and leaving the ring. Reigns resumed his feud with Strowman, after Strowman kayfabe injured Reigns's shoulder. At Payback on April 30, Reigns lost to Strowman. The feud between the two was put on hold after Strowman legitimately injured his elbow. At Extreme Rules on June 4, Reigns competed in a fatal five-way Extreme Rules match against Wyatt, Finn Bálor, Samoa Joe and Rollins to determine the number one contender to the WWE Universal Championship, which was won by Joe.

On the June 19 episode of Raw, Reigns was attacked by a returning Strowman, who then defeated Reigns in an ambulance match at Great Balls of Fire on July 9. At SummerSlam on August 20, Reigns was pinned by Brock Lesnar in a Universal Championship match also involving Strowman and Joe. At No Mercy on September 24, Reigns defeated John Cena, which he described the next night on Raw as the biggest win in his career. In October, due to mutual issues with The Miz, The Miztourage (Bo Dallas and Curtis Axel) and Cesaro and Sheamus, Reigns, Ambrose and Rollins decided to reform The Shield in order to combat the aforementioned alliance. Reigns was due to team with Rollins and Ambrose at TLC: Tables, Ladders & Chairs on October 22, but he was removed from the match due to an illness concern. He was replaced by Kurt Angle and The Shield went on to win the match.

Reigns returned on the November 13 episode of Raw and challenged The New Day (Big E, Kofi Kingston and Xavier Woods) to a six-man tag team match at Survivor Series on November 19, which The Shield won. The following night on Raw, Reigns defeated The Miz for the Intercontinental Championship, thus becoming the twenty-eighth Triple Crown and seventeenth Grand Slam champion, the second member of The Shield after Ambrose to achieve the Grand Slam. Reigns would successfully defend the title against Elias, Jason Jordan, Cesaro, and Samoa Joe before losing it back to The Miz on the 25th Anniversary of Raw on January 22, 2018, ending his reign at 63 days.

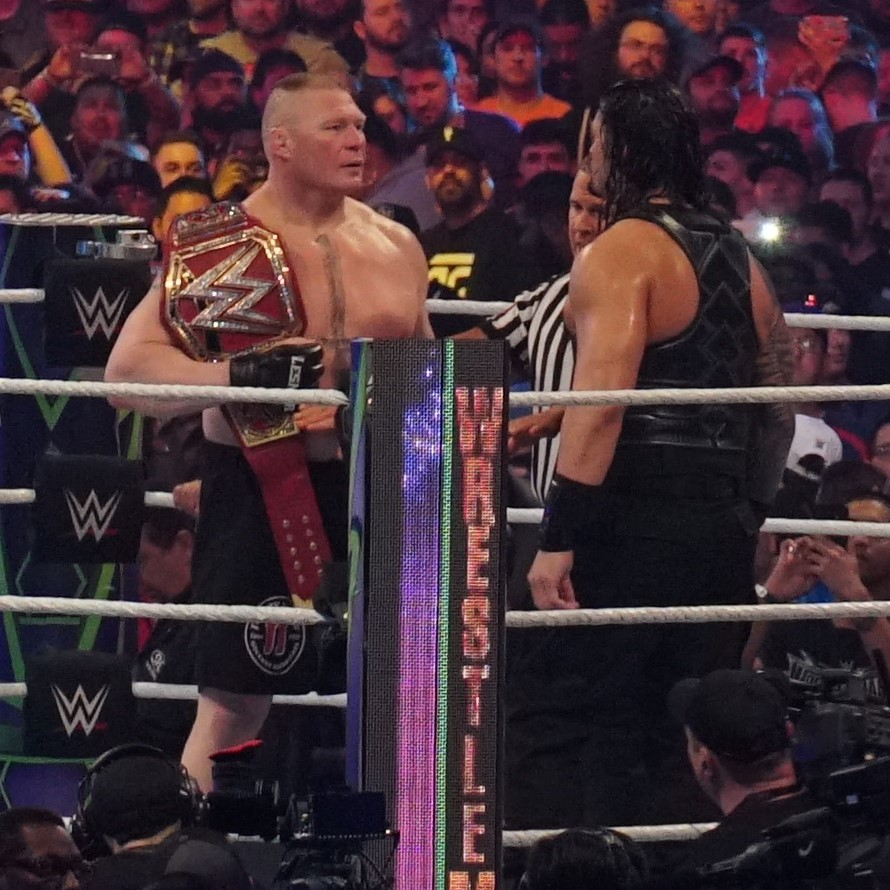
Reigns facing Brock Lesnar before their Universal Championship match at WrestleMania 34

Reigns competed in the 2018 Royal Rumble match on January 28, but was the last man eliminated by eventual winner Shinsuke Nakamura. On February 25, at Elimination Chamber, Reigns won the inaugural seven-man Elimination Chamber match to face Brock Lesnar for the Universal Championship at WrestleMania 34 on April 8, where he was unsuccessful. He narrowly lost a rematch for the title in a steel cage match at the Greatest Royal Rumble on April 27, after spearing Lesnar through the cage wall. After defeating Samoa Joe at Backlash on May 6 and Jinder Mahal at Money in the Bank on June 17, Reigns entered a feud with Bobby Lashley, where both men believed that they were the rightful challenger to Lesnar's championship. At Extreme Rules on July 15, Reigns lost to Lashley. The following night on Raw, two triple threat matches were set to determine Lesnar's challenger for SummerSlam. Reigns and Lashley won their respective matches, setting up a number one contender's match between the two the following week, which Reigns won. At SummerSlam on August 19, Reigns defeated Lesnar and won the Universal Championship for the first time in his career.

Reigns then reignited his feud with Money in the Bank holder Braun Strowman, who allied himself with Dolph Ziggler and Drew McIntyre to challenge The Shield. Reigns defended his title against Strowman at Hell in a Cell on September 16 in a Hell in a Cell match, which ended in a no contest after Lesnar returned and attacked both men. On October 6, at Super Show-Down, The Shield defeated Strowman, Ziggler and McIntyre before losing to them in a rematch on Raw two nights later. A triple threat match between Reigns, Strowman and Lesnar for the Universal Championship was scheduled for Crown Jewel, however, on October 22, Reigns relinquished the title and announced his hiatus on Raw, revealing that his leukemia had returned after 11 years of privately battling it and being in remission. Following this announcement, Reigns would go on an indefinite hiatus to receive treatment.

==== Return from leukemia (2019–2020) ====
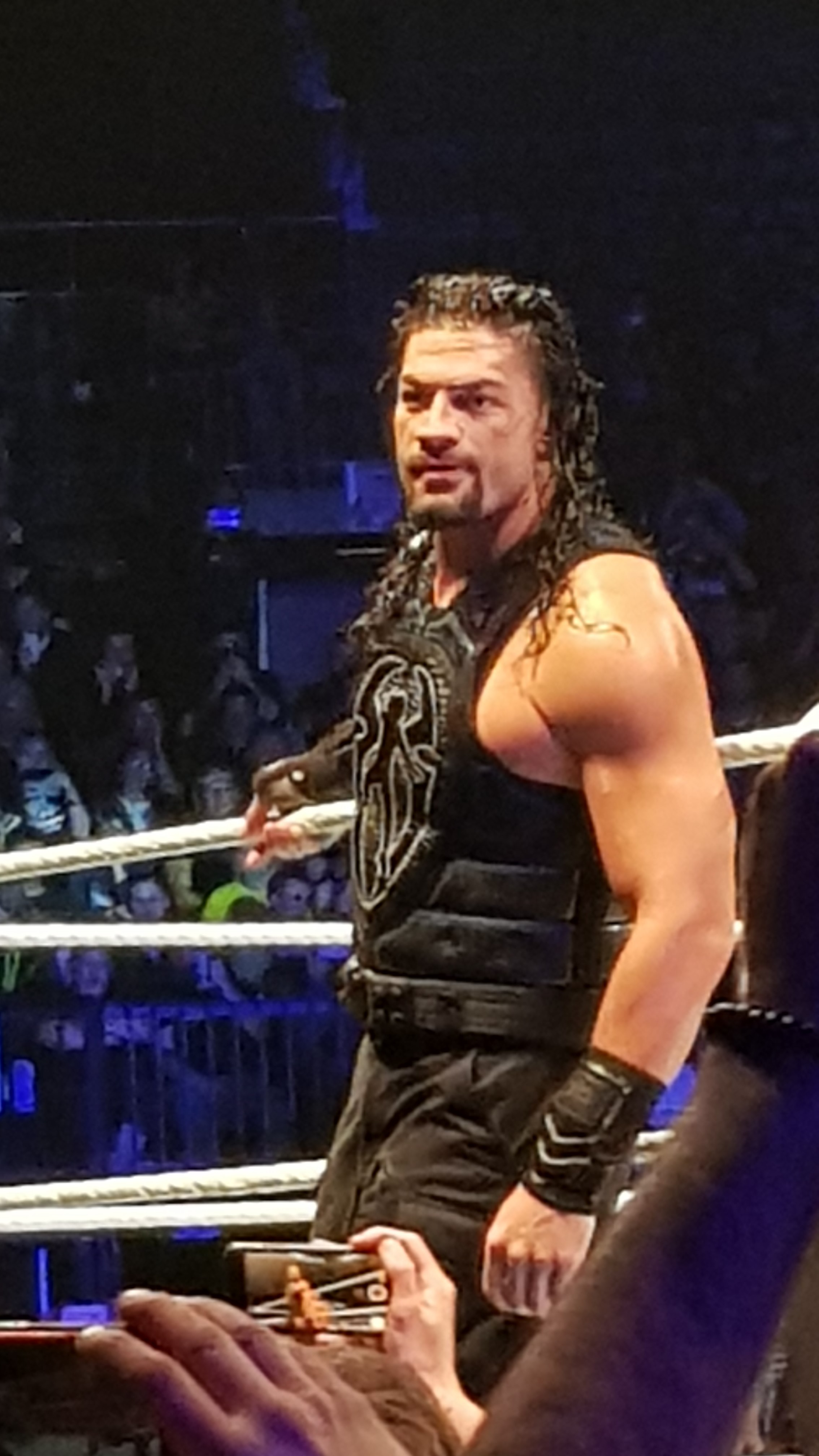
Reigns in May 2019

On February 25, 2019, Reigns made his return to Raw, revealing that his leukemia was once again in remission to a huge ovation from the crowd. Later in the night, Reigns and Rollins would appear to assist Ambrose from an attack by McIntyre, Bobby Lashley, Elias, and Baron Corbin. The following week on Raw, Ambrose assisted Reigns and Rollins from another attack by the four, before the trio performed their signature pose, officially reuniting the group for the third time. The Shield defeated McIntyre, Lashley, and Corbin at Fastlane on March 10. At WrestleMania 35 on April 7, Reigns defeated McIntyre.

During the 2019 WWE Superstar Shake-up, Reigns was drafted to the SmackDown brand on the April 16 episode of SmackDown, with WWE's announcers describing Reigns as "SmackDown's greatest ever acquisition", as well as the future of SmackDown and WWE. During the episode, Reigns attacked Elias and Vince McMahon. At Money in the Bank on May 19, Reigns defeated Elias. The next night on Raw, Reigns, who appeared via the wild card rule, was interrupted by Shane McMahon, who was bothered by Reigns' earlier attack on his father. Reigns then challenged Shane to a match at Super ShowDown, which the latter accepted. At Super ShowDown on June 7, Reigns lost to McMahon after interference from McIntyre. Reigns defeated McIntyre in a rematch at Stomping Grounds on June 23, despite interference from McMahon. At Extreme Rules on July 14, Reigns and The Undertaker defeated McMahon and McIntyre in a No Holds Barred tag team match to end their feud.

On the July 30 episode of SmackDown, an unidentified person pushed lighting equipment on Reigns. The following week, Reigns was again targeted by the attacker as he was a victim of a hit and run. After ruling out Samoa Joe and Buddy Murphy as suspects, Reigns next investigated Daniel Bryan and Erick Rowan due to testimony from Murphy and seemingly incriminating video footage. However, Bryan revealed the attacker as a man who merely resembled Rowan. Nonetheless, Reigns found additional footage that showed Rowan pushing over the equipment. Rowan then admitted that it was him and said he was responsible for the hit and run as well, causing him and Bryan to split due to him lying. At Clash of Champions on September 15, Reigns lost to Rowan in a no disqualification match after interference from a returning Luke Harper. Reigns defeated Rowan in a lumberjack match on the 20th Anniversary of SmackDown and teamed with Bryan to defeat Rowan and Harper at Hell in a Cell on October 6 in a tornado tag team match to end the feud. At Crown Jewel on October 31, Reigns was part of Team Hogan, defeating Team Flair.

In November, Reigns began a feud with King Corbin and his allies Dolph Ziggler and Robert Roode. Reigns was named team captain for SmackDown at Survivor Series on November 24, where he and his four teammates defeated Team Raw and Team NXT in a five-on-five-on-five tag team elimination match; Reigns would eliminate Corbin in the match. At TLC: Tables, Ladders & Chairs on December 15, Reigns lost to Corbin in a tables, ladders, and chairs match after interference from Ziggler and The Revival (Dash Wilder and Scott Dawson). At Royal Rumble on January 26, 2020, Reigns defeated Corbin in a falls count anywhere match after receiving assistance from The Usos. Later that night, he entered the Royal Rumble match at number 26, but was the last competitor eliminated by the eventual winner Drew McIntyre. At Super ShowDown on February 27, Reigns defeated Corbin in a steel cage match to end their feud.

The following night on SmackDown, Reigns challenged Goldberg for the Universal Championship, leading to a match between the two being set up for WrestleMania 36. However, in late March, Reigns pulled out of the event amid concerns surrounding the COVID-19 pandemic and being immunocompromised from his leukemia, and he was replaced by Braun Strowman. Following WrestleMania, Reigns continued to remain absent from WWE programming in the midst of the pandemic, telling Hindustan Times: "For me, I just had to make a choice for my family. The company (WWE) has done everything that they can to make it the safest work environment possible. It is not the workplace that I was necessarily concerned about. The decision was taken mainly because each performer travels so much, and we are all such a diverse group and from all over the place. I'm not convinced, and I can't trust the fact that everybody is taking it as seriously and locking themselves down at home like I am. I trust my life with my co-workers every time I step foot in the ring, but I just can't put the same trust when it has my children, my wife, and my family involved."

==== The Tribal Chief (2020–2024) ====
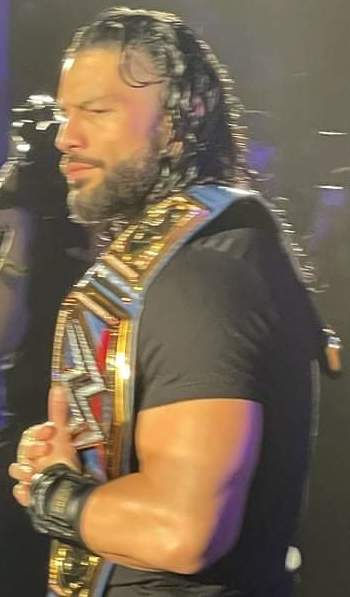
For 1,316 days from August 2020 till April 2024, Reigns held the Universal Championship, becoming the longest-reigning title holder in the championship's history and the longest-reigning champion in company history since 1988.

After a five-month hiatus, Reigns returned at SummerSlam on August 23, attacking new Universal Champion "The Fiend" Bray Wyatt and Strowman after their title match. On the following SmackDown, Reigns aligned himself with his new manager, Paul Heyman, turning heel for the first time since 2014. At Payback on August 30, Reigns defeated defending champion The Fiend and Strowman in a No Holds Barred triple threat match to win the Universal Championship for the second time.

At Clash of Champions on September 27, Reigns made his first successful title defense against his cousin Jey Uso by technical knockout, after Reigns viciously beat down Jey and Jimmy Uso threw in the towel. On the October 16 episode of SmackDown, Reigns retained the title against Strowman. At Hell in a Cell on October 25, Reigns again retained the title against Jey in an "I Quit" Hell in a Cell match by making him quit after attacking the injured Jimmy. Due to the loss, Jey was ordered to follow Reigns' commands and address him as "The Tribal Chief", turning him heel. At Survivor Series on November 22, Reigns defeated WWE Champion Drew McIntyre in an interbrand champion vs. champion match.

Afterwards, Reigns reignited his feud with Kevin Owens after believing Owens disrespected his family, culminating in successful defenses against Owens in a TLC match at TLC: Tables, Ladders & Chairs on December 20, in a steel cage match on the December 25 episode of SmackDown, and in a Last Man Standing match at Royal Rumble on January 31, 2021. Reigns began feuding with Royal Rumble match winner Edge and retained his title against Daniel Bryan at Elimination Chamber on February 21 and Fastlane on March 21. In the main event of Night 2 of WrestleMania 37 on April 11, Reigns defeated Bryan and Edge in a triple threat match to retain the title with assistance from Jey. On the April 30 episode of SmackDown, Reigns defeated Bryan in a championship vs. career match, which resulted in Bryan being forced to leave SmackDown. Reigns retained the title against Cesaro at WrestleMania Backlash on May 16 and Rey Mysterio in a Hell in a Cell match on the June 18 episode of SmackDown.

The following week, Reigns was attacked by the returning Edge, leading to a match between the two at Money in the Bank on July 18, where Reigns retained the title after interference from Seth Rollins. After the match, Reigns was confronted by a returning John Cena. Over the following weeks, Cena challenged Reigns for a title match at SummerSlam, which he initially rejected before Cena hijacked a contract signing between Reigns and Finn Bálor to make the match official. At the event on August 21, Reigns defeated Cena to retain the title; he was confronted by a returning Brock Lesnar after the match. Reigns successfully defended the title against Bálor on the September 3 episode of SmackDown and in an Extreme Rules match at Extreme Rules on September 26 with Bálor in his Demon persona. On October 21, at Crown Jewel, Reigns retained the title against Lesnar with help from the Usos. At Survivor Series on November 21, Reigns defeated WWE Champion Big E in a champion vs. champion match. On the December 3 episode of SmackDown, Reigns defeated Sami Zayn in 15 seconds to retain the title after Lesnar attacked Zayn before the match began.

A match for the Universal Championship between Reigns and Lesnar was then set for Day 1. On the December 17 episode of SmackDown, Reigns fired Heyman as his manager due to Heyman's past association with Lesnar. On January 1, 2022, the day of the event, the match between Reigns and Lesnar was cancelled as a result of Reigns testing positive for COVID-19. On January 16, Reigns surpassed Lesnar's 503-day reign to become the longest reigning Universal Champion, in turn having the sixth longest world championship reign in the company's history. At Royal Rumble on January 29, Reigns defended the championship against Seth "Freakin" Rollins, losing the match by disqualification; since championships cannot change hands by disqualification, Reigns retained the title. Later that night, he interfered in the WWE Championship match between Lesnar and Bobby Lashley, reuniting with Heyman to cause the upset victory for Lashley to regain the championship. Also that night, Lesnar won the Royal Rumble match, and on the following episode of Raw, he challenged Reigns to a match in the main event of WrestleMania 38, marking the third time Reigns would face Lesnar in the main event of WrestleMania. At Elimination Chamber on February 19, Reigns defeated Goldberg via technical submission to retain the title. Later in the event, Lesnar won the WWE Championship in an Elimination Chamber match, turning their match at WrestleMania into a Winner Takes All match.

On Night 2 of WrestleMania 38 on April 3, Reigns defeated Lesnar to win the WWE Championship for a fourth time and became the first wrestler to hold both the WWE Championship and WWE Universal Championship simultaneously and be recognized as the Undisputed WWE Universal Champion. At WrestleMania Backlash on May 8, Reigns and The Usos defeated RK-Bro (Randy Orton and Riddle) and Drew McIntyre. On the June 17 episode of SmackDown, Reigns successfully defended the Undisputed WWE Universal Championship against Riddle, but after the match, he was attacked by a returning Lesnar to renew their rivalry and set up a Last Man Standing match at SummerSlam on July 30, which Reigns won to end their seven-year feud. At Clash at the Castle on September 3, Reigns successfully defended the titles against McIntyre after interference from the debuting Solo Sikoa. At Crown Jewel on November 5, Reigns retained the titles against Logan Paul. Three weeks later at Survivor Series: WarGames on November 26, Reigns, along with The Bloodline, defeated McIntyre, Kevin Owens and The Brawling Brutes (Sheamus, Ridge Holland and Butch) in a WarGames match.

On January 18, 2023, his Universal Championship reign reached 871 days, breaking Gunther's NXT UK Championship reign of 870 days, giving him the longest reign of any WWE championship since 1988. At Royal Rumble on January 28, Reigns successfully defended the titles against Owens for the fourth time. Following the match, Sami Zayn would turn on The Bloodline, smashing Reigns with a chair. He then began feuding with Cody Rhodes, who won the Royal Rumble match and earned a match against Reigns in the Night 2 main event of WrestleMania 39. At Elimination Chamber on February 18, Reigns retained the titles against Zayn. At Night 2 of WrestleMania 39 on April 2, Reigns successfully defended the titles against Rhodes after interference from Sikoa.

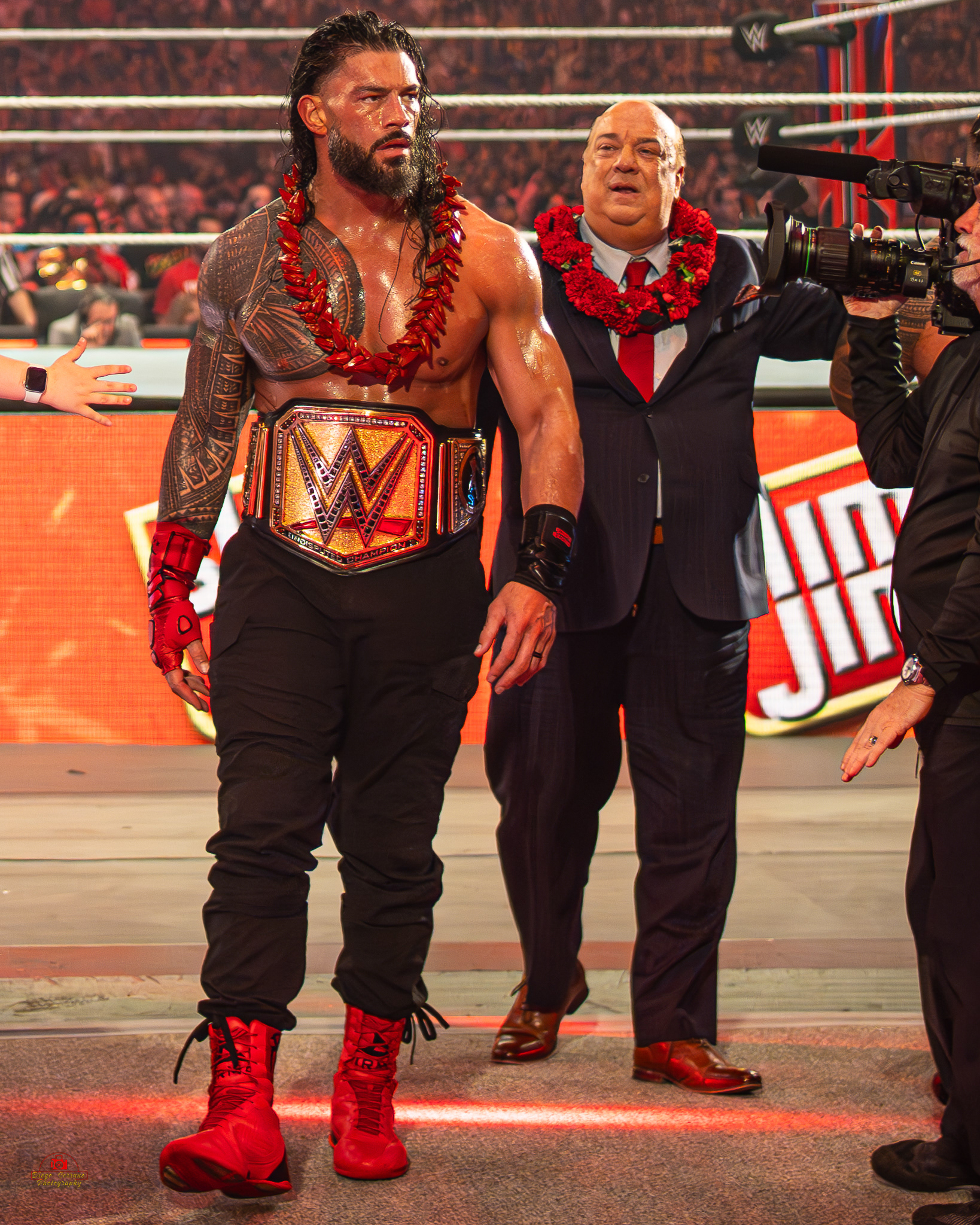
Reigns (left) with Paul Heyman at Royal Rumble in January 2024

At Night of Champions on May 27, Reigns and Sikoa unsuccessfully challenged Kevin Owens and Sami Zayn for the Undisputed WWE Tag Team Championship. During the match, The Usos interfered and accidentally attacked Sikoa while aiming for Zayn. The subsequent sequence of events culminated in Jimmy Uso attacking Reigns, and The Usos walking away from The Bloodline. It was on this day as well, that Reigns hit 1,000 days as Universal Champion, the first to do so in over thirty-five years, and only the fifth wrestler ever to accomplish the feat with a world championship in the history of WWE. On June 24, Reigns reached 1,028 days as Universal Champion, passing Pedro Morales' reign of 1,027 days with the WWE Championship (at the time known as the WWWF Heavyweight Championship), giving Reigns the fifth longest world championship reign in company history. At Money in the Bank on July 1, Reigns and Sikoa lost to The Usos in a "Bloodline Civil War" tag team match after Reigns was pinned by Jey, marking his first pinfall loss since December 2019. On August 5, at SummerSlam, Reigns defeated Jey in Tribal Combat to retain the titles and his status as Tribal Chief, after Jimmy betrayed Jey. At Crown Jewel on November 4, Reigns successfully defended the titles against LA Knight. At Royal Rumble on January 27, 2024, Reigns defeated Knight, Randy Orton and AJ Styles, who Reigns pinned, to retain the titles in a fatal four-way match.

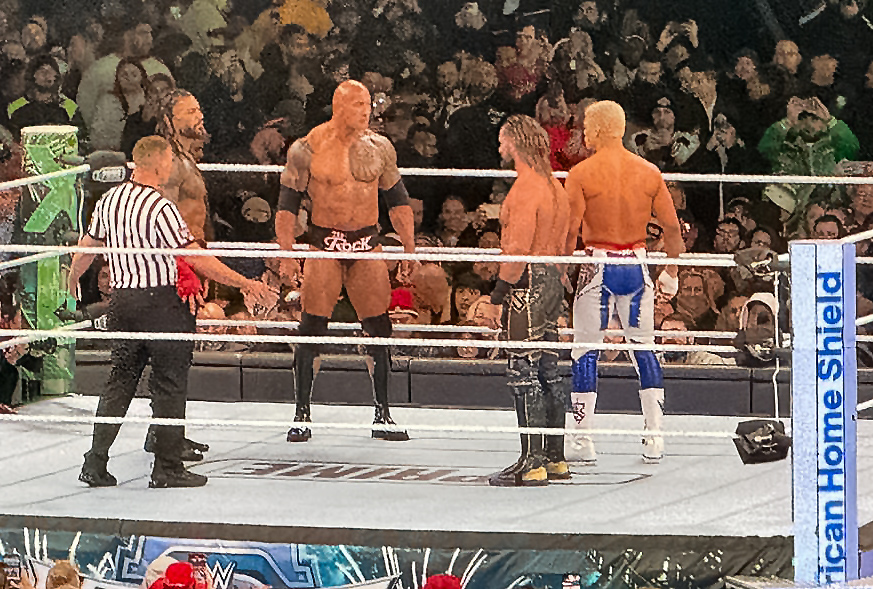
Reigns (extreme left) and The Rock face to face with Cody Rhodes and Seth "Freakin" Rollins at WrestleMania XL Night 1 in April 2024

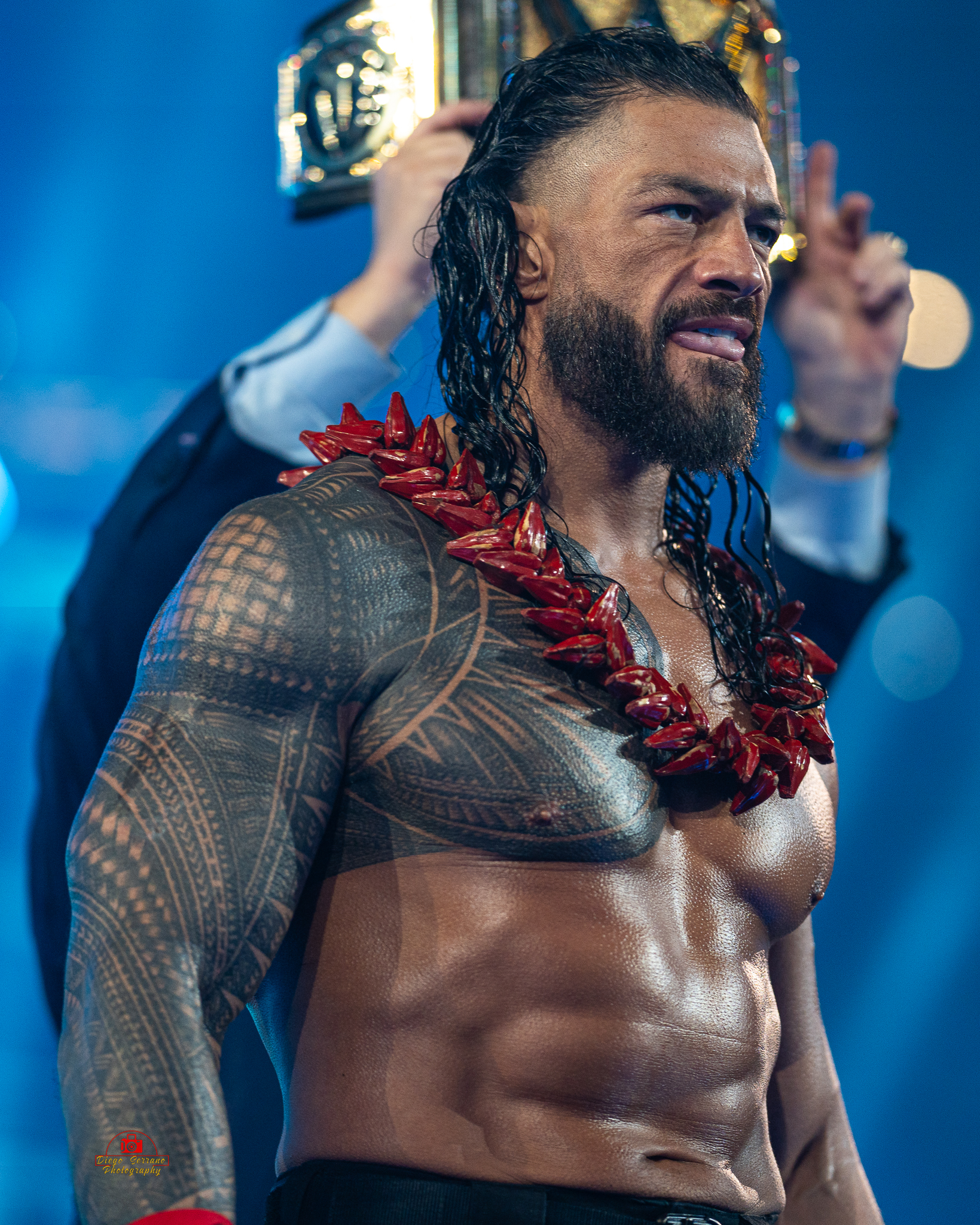
Reigns making his entrance for his championship defence at WrestleMania XL Night 2

On the February 2 episode of SmackDown, Rhodes, who again won the Royal Rumble match, said that he would not challenge Reigns for the titles at WrestleMania XL, after which The Rock confronted Reigns, implying he would be Reigns' opponent instead. After this development drew backlash for disrupting their long-term storyline, during the WrestleMania XL Kickoff media event on February 8, Rhodes announced that he would face Reigns. On Night 1 of WrestleMania XL on April 6, Reigns and The Rock defeated Rhodes and Seth Rollins to enforce Bloodline Rules for their title match. The next night on April 7, Reigns lost the titles to Rhodes, ending his second record-setting Universal Championship reign at 1,316 days and ending his fourth WWE Championship reign at 735 days. WWE would later amend the official title history of the Universal Championship, recognizing that upon Reigns's loss of the Undisputed title at WrestleMania XL, the Universal Championship was retired with Reigns recognized as its final champion; the WWE Championship became subsequently referred to as the Undisputed WWE Championship.

==== The O.T.C. (2024–present) ====
After losing the titles, Reigns took time off from television and Sikoa was appointed himself as the de facto leader of The Bloodline. The formation changed when Jimmy was kicked out of the group and The Tongans (Tama Tonga and Tonga Loa), the sons of Haku, as well as Jacob Fatu, the son of the Tonga Kid, were included into the stable. On the April 26 episode of SmackDown, Paul Heyman announced that Reigns voluntarily withdrew from the 2024 WWE Draft. After weeks of bypassing Reigns' orders in storyline and ousting Heyman from the group, Sikoa removed Reigns from the leadership of The Bloodline and the group altogether, declaring himself as the new "Tribal Chief".

Following a four-month hiatus, on August 3, Reigns made his return at SummerSlam under the new moniker "The O.T.C" ("The Only Tribal Chief" or "The Original Tribal Chief"), attacking Sikoa and helping Rhodes retain his title in a Bloodline Rules match, turning face for the first time since 2020. At Bad Blood on October 5, Reigns and Rhodes defeated Sikoa and Fatu after interference from the returning Jimmy Uso. Following the match, The Rock returned and stared down Reigns, Rhodes, and Jimmy Uso, before later counting to three and motioning the fingers across his neck. On the October 25 episode of SmackDown, Reigns and the reunited Usos cost The Tongans the WWE Tag Team Championships, setting up a six-man tag team match against Sikoa, Tonga and Fatu at Crown Jewel on November 2, which they lost. At Survivor Series: WarGames on November 30, Reigns, the Usos, Sami Zayn and CM Punk defeated The Bloodline and Bronson Reed in a WarGames match, with Reigns pinning Sikoa. Reigns then challenged Sikoa for the Ula Fala and Tribal Chief title in Tribal Combat at the Raw premiere on Netflix on January 6, 2025, where Reigns defeated Sikoa to reclaim his Ula Fala and Tribal Chief title, with The Rock presenting Reigns with the Ula Fala after the match ending their feud.

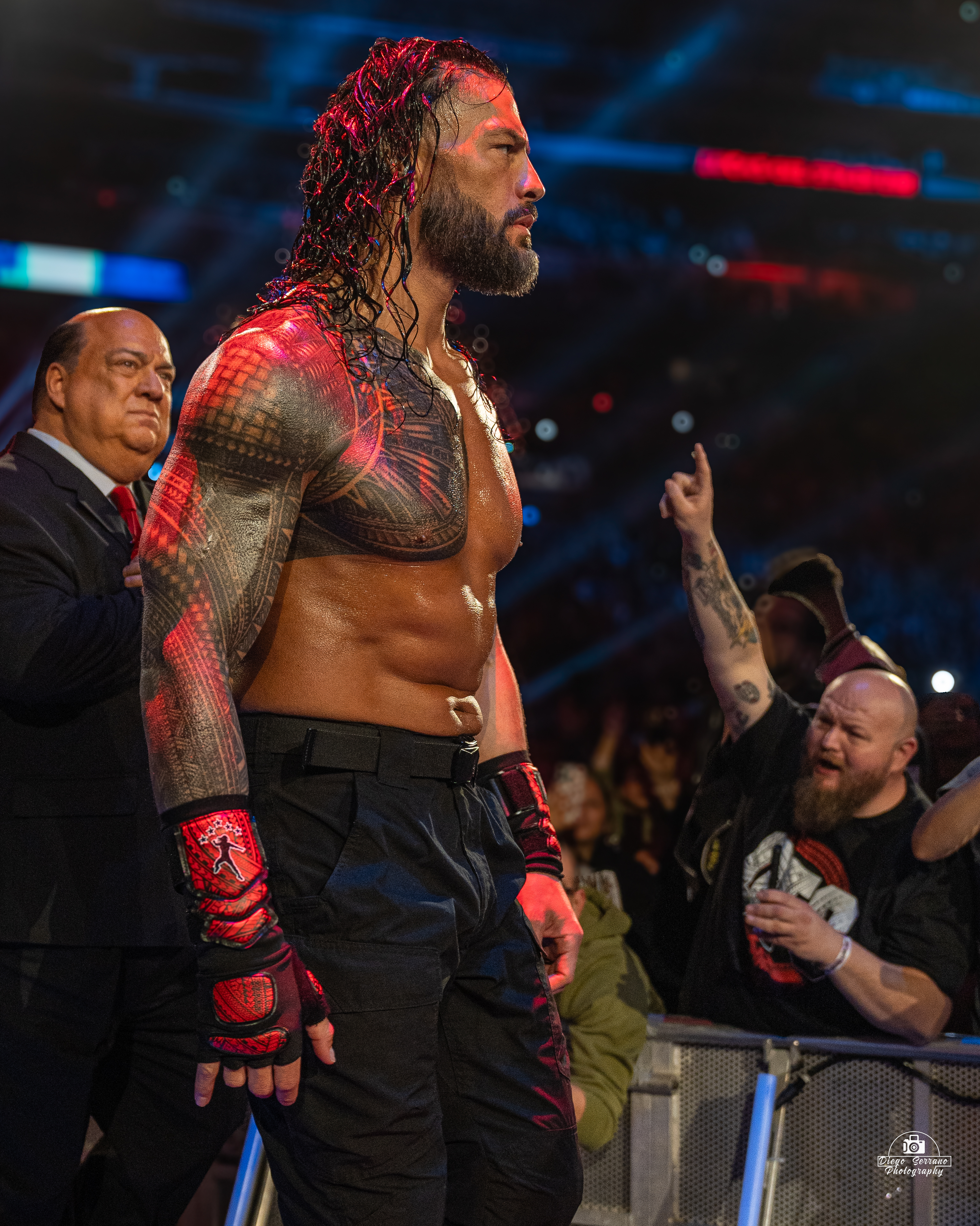
Reigns (center) with Paul Heyman at the Royal Rumble in February 2025

At Royal Rumble on February 1, Reigns entered the Royal Rumble match at number 16, scoring four eliminations. As he and Rollins attempted to eliminate each other, both were eliminated from behind by Punk. Rollins then delivered multiple Curb Stomps to Reigns before storming off. He returned on the March 10 episode of Raw to attack both Rollins and Punk during their steel cage match. On the March 21 episode of SmackDown, a brawl ensued between all three men, with Reigns, Rollins, and Punk pointing at the WrestleMania sign, leading to a triple threat match between the three being made official as the Night 1 main event of WrestleMania 41. On the April 4 episode of SmackDown, Punk revealed that Paul Heyman would not be in Reigns' corner at WrestleMania 41, but instead in his own, as part of a favor Punk called in for teaming with Reigns at Survivor Series. On Night 1 of WrestleMania 41 on April 19, Rollins defeated Reigns and Punk following a double betrayal by Paul Heyman, who aligned himself with Rollins in the process and turned heel. Two nights later on Raw, Reigns would be taken out by Rollins and Bron Breakker.

On the July 14 episode of Raw, Reigns returned after a three month absence, coming to the aid of CM Punk and Jey Uso from an attack by Breakker and Bronson Reed. On July 22, Reigns proposed a tag team match between himself and Jey against Breakker and Reed; the match was subsequently made official for SummerSlam. On August 2 on Night 1 of SummerSlam, Reigns and Uso defeated Breakker and Reed. Reigns defeated Reed at Clash in Paris on August 31, before being viciously attacked post-match by Reed and Breakker. This was done to write Reigns off of television to allow him to film the movie Street Fighter. On the September 29 episode of Raw, Reigns returned to help The Usos defeat Breakker and Reed in a Tornado Tag Team match, leading to an Australian Street Fight between Reigns and Reed at Crown Jewel on October 11, where Reigns lost to Reed after interference from Breakker and The Usos. At Survivor Series: WarGames on November 29, Reigns, The Usos, World Heavyweight Champion CM Punk, and Undisputed WWE Champion Cody Rhodes were defeated by Breakker, Reed, Brock Lesnar, Drew McIntyre, and Logan Paul in a WarGames match after interference from a mysterious hooded figure which was later revealed to be Austin Theory.

Reigns would next appear at the Royal Rumble on January 31, 2026, where he entered the eponymous match at number 26 and scored five eliminations. He last eliminated Gunther to win the Royal Rumble match for a second time, securing a world championship match at WrestleMania 42. On the following episode of Raw, Reigns announced that he would challenge CM Punk for Raw's World Heavyweight Championship in the main event of Night 2 on April 19. Reigns defeated Punk to capture the title at WrestleMania. The match was critically acclaimed, with renowned professional wrestling journalist Dave Meltzer rating it five stars out of five; this was Reigns' first match to be accredited such a rating. His first two World Heavyweight title defences were against his cousin Jacob Fatu, where he retained at Backlash on May 9 and at Clash in Italy on May 31 in a Tribal Combat match, with the latter match having the stipulation of Fatu being forced to align with Reigns and acknowledge him as his Tribal Chief. After Clash in Italy, Reigns re-formed The Bloodline with Fatu and The Usos. At Night 2 of SummerSlam on August 2, Reigns retained the title against Rollins, after the match Reigns and Rollins showed respect to one another by doing their signature Shield fist bump to signal the end of their 12-year rivalry. At Raw in Mexico City on September 14, Reigns successfully defended the title against Penta. At Money in the Bank on October 10, Reigns successfully defended the title against LA Knight. At Crown Jewel on November 7, Reigns defeated Undisputed WWE Champion Sami Zayn in a Champion vs. Champion match to win the Crown Jewel Championship.

== Personal life ==
While attending the Georgia Institute of Technology, Anoa'i began a relationship with Galina Becker, a fellow student-athlete who competed in track and field and later became a fitness model. The couple married in December 2014 at Disney's Castaway Cay in the Bahamas. They have five children: a daughter born in 2007, and two sets of twins born in 2016 and 2020. The family resides in Tampa, Florida.

Anoa'i is a registered Democrat but identifies as a centrist, having voted for Republican candidate Donald Trump in the 2024 United States presidential election.

In October 2018, Anoaʻi revealed that he had been living with chronic myeloid leukemia (CML), an incurable but treatable form of blood cancer. He was originally diagnosed in 2007 during his professional football career and continues to undergo lifelong oral chemotherapy to manage the condition.

== Other media ==
Anoaʻi appeared as Roman Reigns in WWE 2K14, WWE 2K15, WWE 2K16, WWE 2K17, WWE 2K18, WWE 2K19, WWE 2K20 (of which he was the cover star), WWE 2K Battlegrounds, WWE 2K22, WWE 2K23, WWE 2K24, WWE 2K25 (of which he was the cover star again), WWE 2K26 and Madden NFL 24 (as part of the "Reel Deals" promotion in the game's Madden Ultimate Team mode).

Reigns also makes regular appearances on fellow wrestler Xavier Woods' comedic YouTube channel UpUpDownDown under the nickname "The Merchandise".

On December 31, 2019, Reigns appeared on Fox's New Year's Eve with Steve Harvey, where he defeated Dolph Ziggler in a pre-taped match.

== Filmography ==
=== Film ===
| Year | Title | Role | Notes |
|---|---|---|---|
| 2016 | Countdown | Himself | Uncredited cameo |
| 2017 | The Jetsons & WWE: Robo-WrestleMania! | Himself | Voice role |
| 2019 | Fast & Furious Presents: Hobbs & Shaw | Mateo Hobbs | |
| 2020 | The Wrong Missy | Tatted Meathead (Gary) | |
| 2021 | Rumble | Ramarilla | Voice role |
| 2025 | The Pickup | MMA Fighter | |
| 2025 | Zootopia 2 | Zebro Zebraxton | Voice role |
| 2026 | Street Fighter | Akuma | |

=== Television ===
| Year | Title | Role | Notes |
|---|---|---|---|
| 2013 | Total Divas | Himself | 1 episode |
| 2015 | WWE 24 | Himself | Documentary about WrestleMania 31 |
| 2016 | Unfiltered | Himself | Interview show with Renee Young |
| 2016 | WWE 24 | Himself | Documentary about WrestleMania 32 |
| 2019 | WWE Chronicle | Himself | 2 episode |
| 2019 | Cousins for Life | Rodney | Episode: "Farewell to Arthur?" |
| 2019 | Fox's New Year's Eve with Steve Harvey | Himself | |
| 2020 | Elena of Avalor | Kizin (voice) | Episode: "Giant Steps" |

== Championships and accomplishments ==
=== Professional wrestling ===
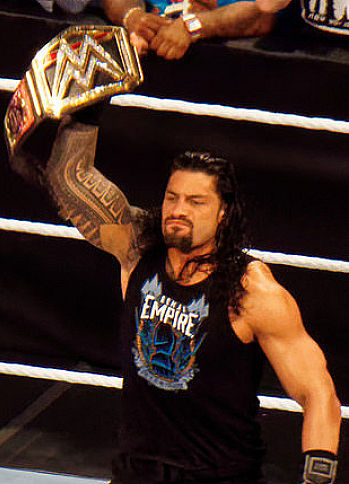
Reigns has won the WWE Championship four times...

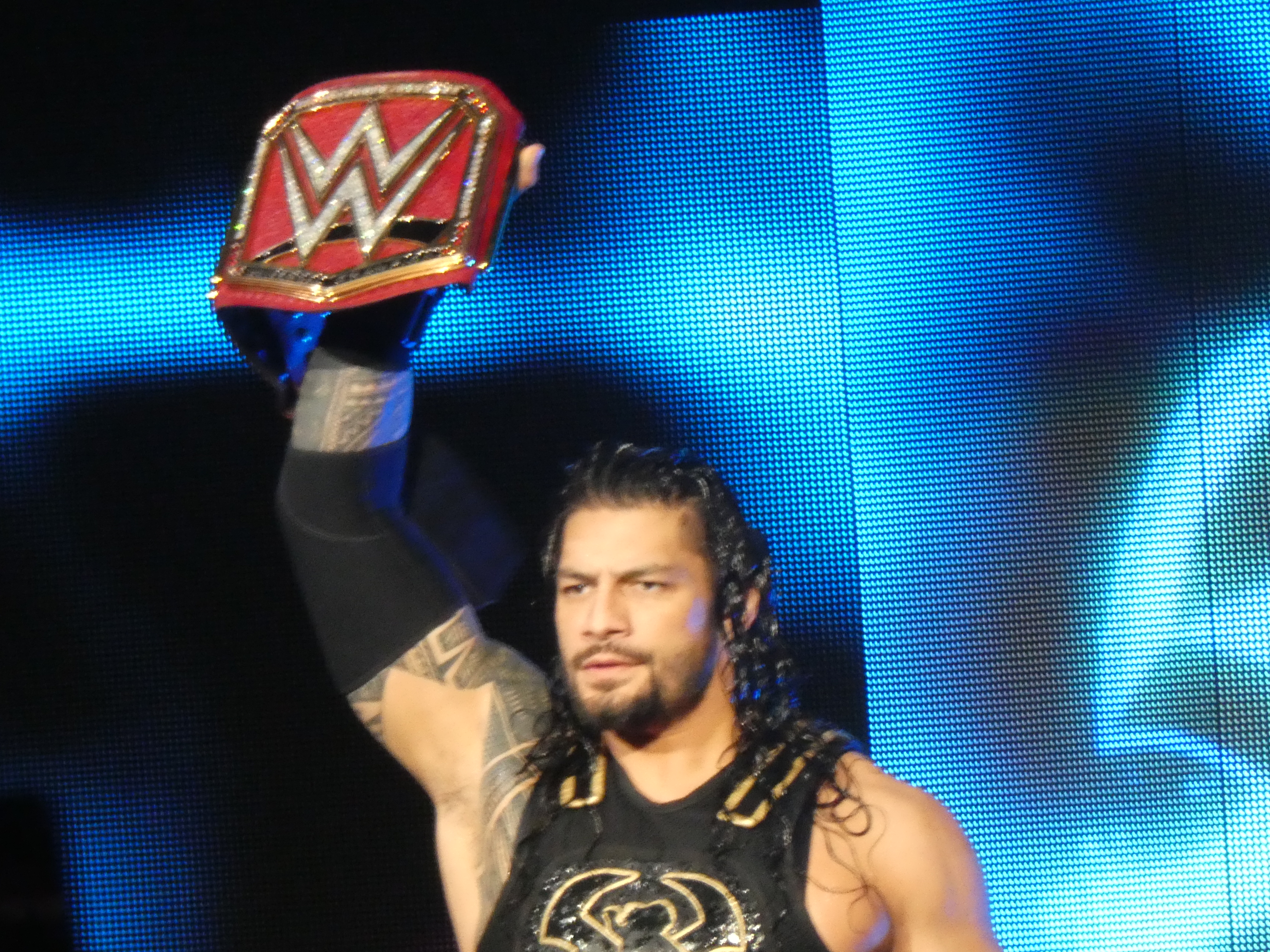
... and held the WWE Universal Championship twice.

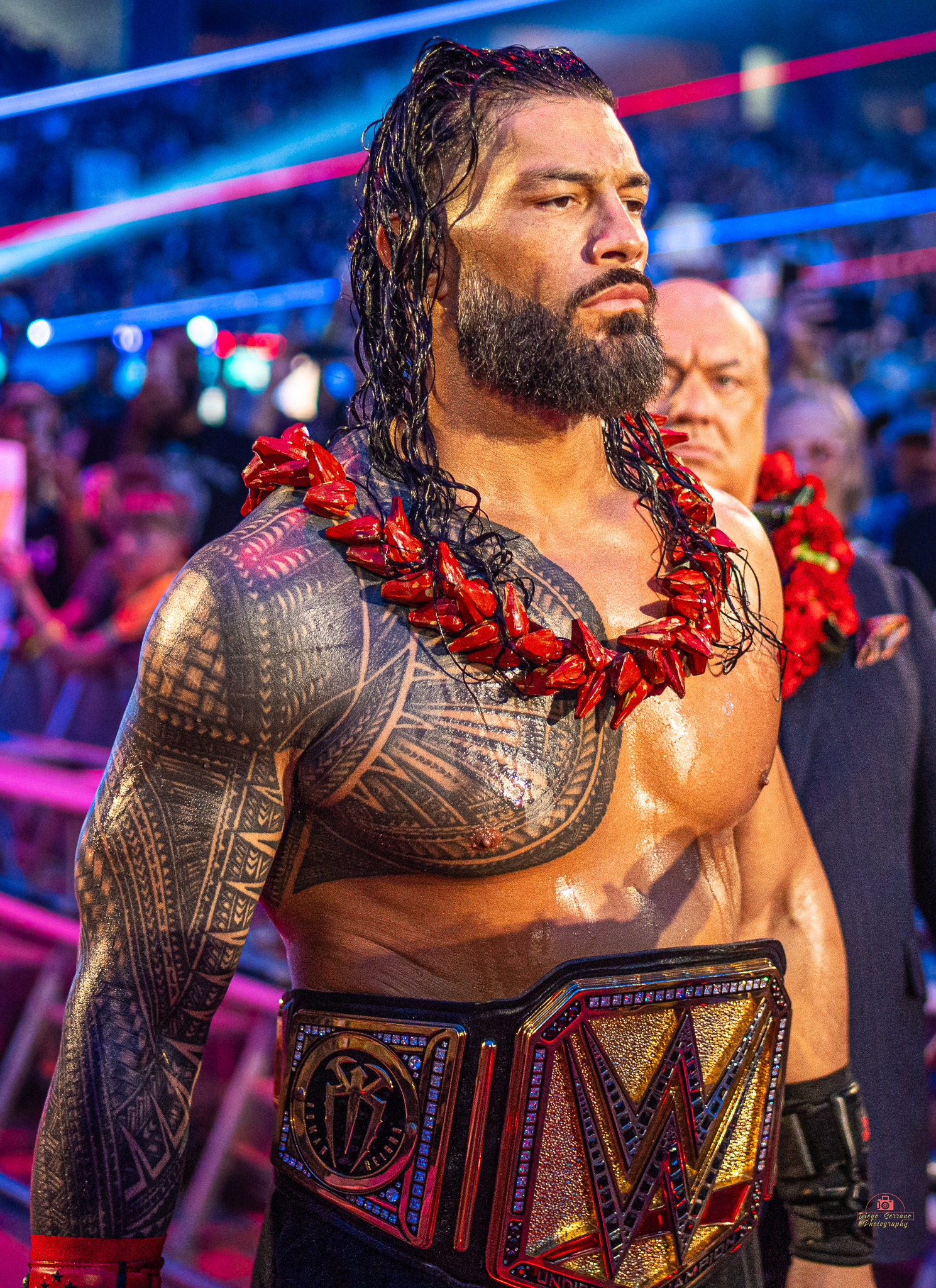
During his fourth reign as WWE Champion, as a result of also holding the Universal Championship, Reigns was recognized as the Undisputed WWE Universal Champion.

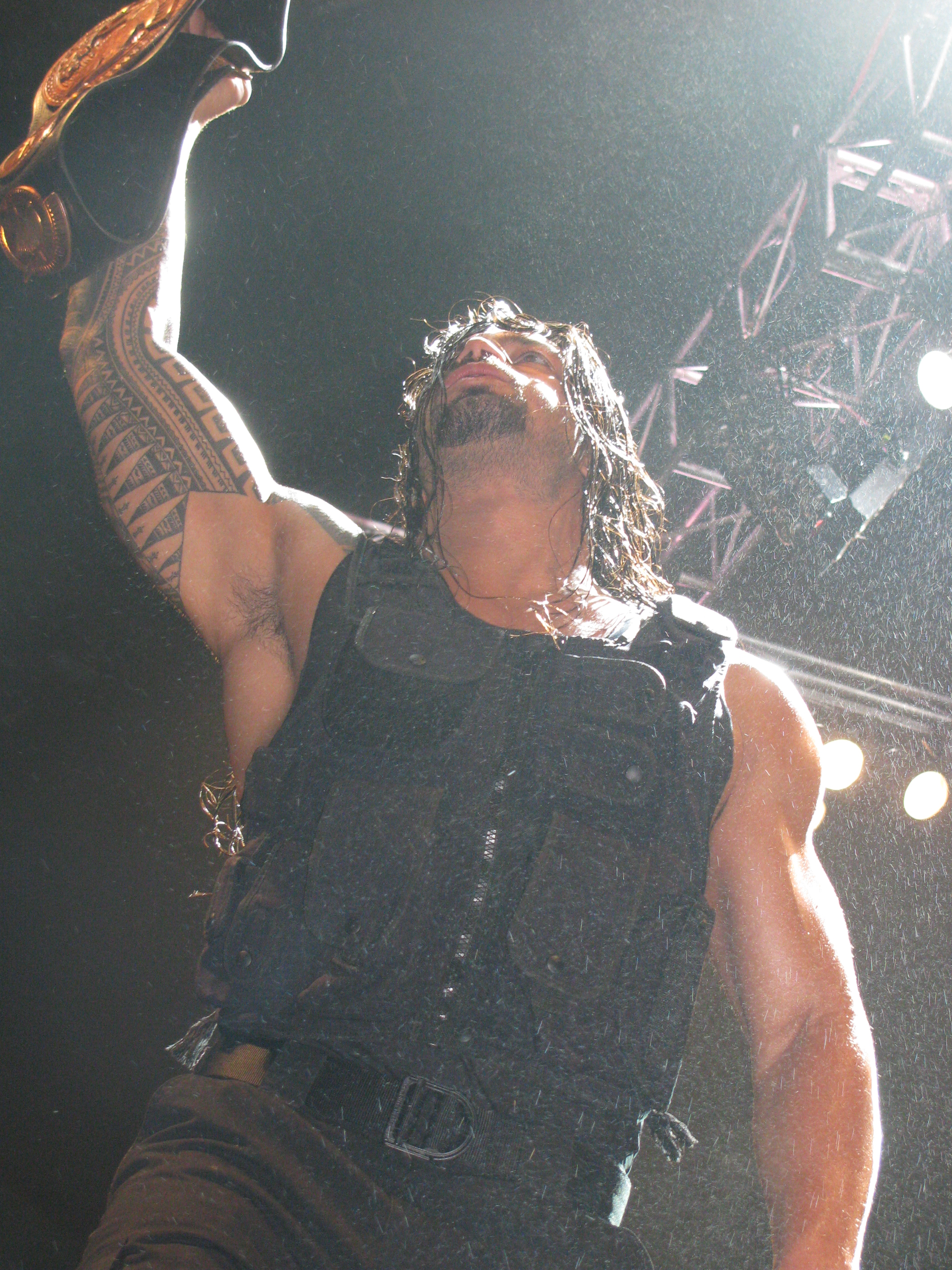
Reigns is also a one-time WWE Tag Team Champion, winning the title with Shield stablemate Seth Rollins...

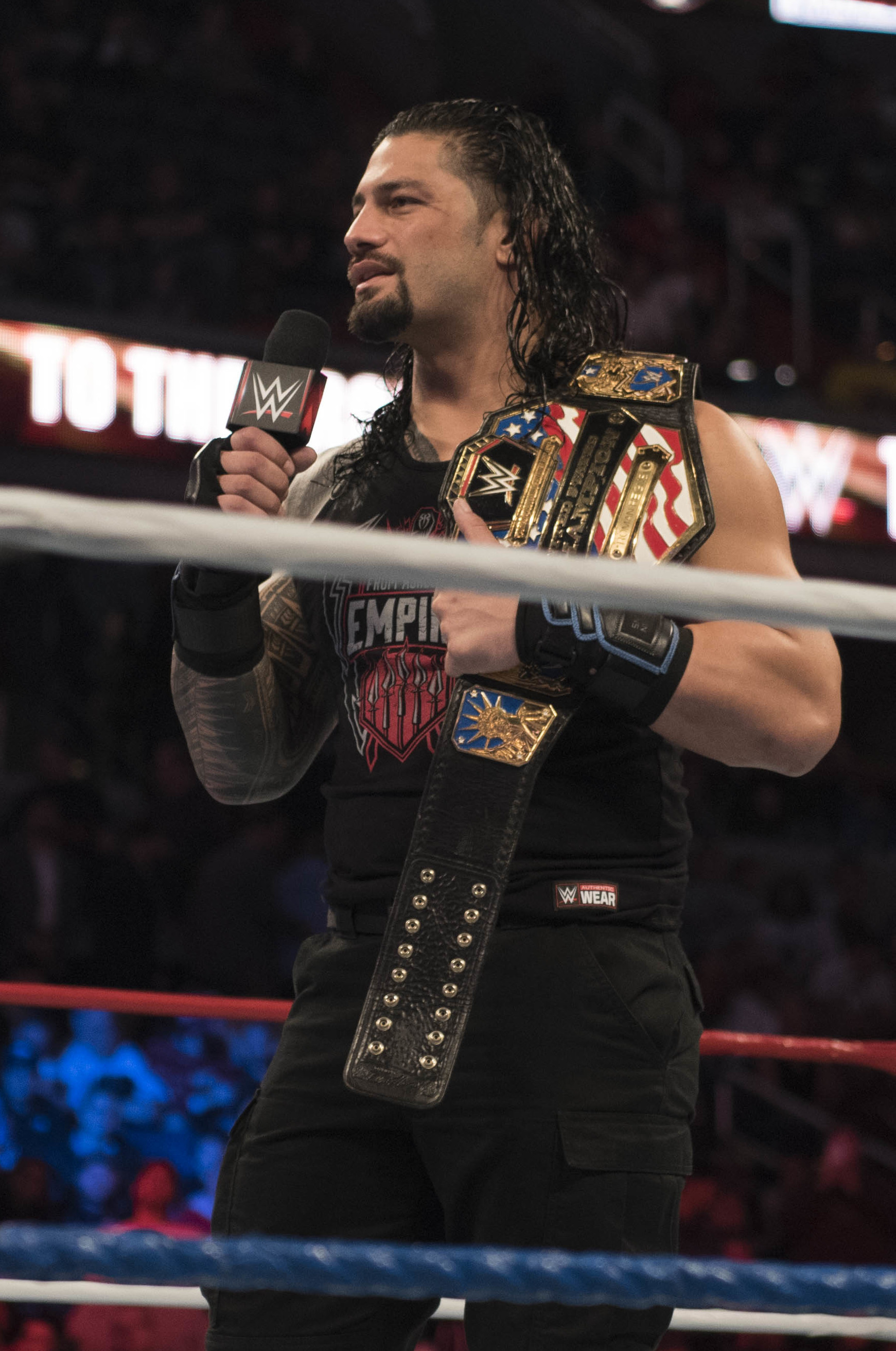
... and a one-time WWE United States Champion.

- CBS Sports
  - Feud of the Year (2020) – vs. Jey Uso
- ESPN
  - Best Storyline of the Year (2022) – part of The Bloodline and Sami Zayn
  - Best Storyline of the Year (2023) – part of The Bloodline 2.0
  - Male Wrestler of the Year (2022)
- ESPY Awards
  - Best WWE Moment (2019) – Reigns returns to Raw and announces that his leukemia was in remission
- Florida Championship Wrestling
  - FCW Florida Tag Team Championship (1 time) – with Mike Dalton
- New York Post
  - Storyline of the Year (2022) – part of The Bloodline and Sami Zayn
- Pro Wrestling Illustrated
  - Comeback of the Year (2019)
  - Inspirational Wrestler of the Year (2018, 2019)
  - Most Hated Wrestler of the Year (2016)
  - Most Improved Wrestler of the Year (2015)
  - Tag Team of the Year (2013) – with Seth Rollins
  - Ranked No. 1 of the top 500 singles wrestlers in the PWI 500 in 2016 and 2022
  - Wrestler of the Year (2022)
  - Faction of the Year (2022) – The Bloodline
  - Match of the Year (2024) – vs. Cody Rhodes at WrestleMania XL
- Sports Illustrated
  - Wrestler of the Year (2021)
  - Ranked No. 5 of the 20 Greatest WWE Wrestlers Of All Time
- Wrestling Observer Newsletter
  - Best Box Office Draw (2022, 2023)
  - Feud of the Year (2023) – as part of The Bloodline vs. Kevin Owens and Sami Zayn
  - Best Gimmick (2021) – as "The Tribal Chief"
  - Most Improved (2013)
  - Tag Team of the Year (2013) – with Seth Rollins
  - Most Overrated (2016)
  - Worst Feud of the Year (2013) – as part of The Authority vs. Big Show
  - WON Hall of Fame (2024)
- WWE
  - WWE Championship (4 times) (Note: The title was named the WWE World Heavyweight Championship during his first three reigns. During his 4th reign the title was jointly held and defended with the WWE Universal Championship as the Undisputed WWE Universal Championship, but both titles maintained their individual lineages.)
  - WWE Universal Championship (2 times, final) (Note: 581 days into his 2nd reign, the title was jointly held and defended with the WWE Championship as the Undisputed WWE Universal Championship, but both titles maintained their individual lineages.) (Note: Reigns was retroactively recognized as the final Universal Champion following its retirement after WrestleMania 41 in April 2025.)
  - World Heavyweight Championship (1 time, current)
  - WWE Intercontinental Championship (1 time)
  - WWE United States Championship (1 time)
  - WWE Tag Team Championship (1 time) – with Seth Rollins
  - WWE Crown Jewel Championship (2026)
  - 28th Triple Crown Champion
  - Ninth Grand Slam Champion (under current format; 17th overall)
  - Men's Royal Rumble (2015, 2026)
  - WWE World Heavyweight Championship Tournament (2015)
  - Slammy Award (10 times)
    - Breakout Star of the Year (2013) – with Dean Ambrose and Seth Rollins as The Shield
    - Extreme Moment of the Year (2015) – Post-TLC rampage
    - Faction of the Year (2013, 2014) – with Dean Ambrose and Seth Rollins as The Shield
    - Superstar of the Year (2014)
    - Trending Now (Hashtag) of the Year (2013) – #BelieveInTheShield with Dean Ambrose and Seth Rollins as The Shield
    - "What a Maneuver" of the Year (2013) – Spear
    - Rivalry of the Year (2024) – vs. Cody Rhodes
    - Match of the Year (2025) – vs. Cody Rhodes at WrestleMania XL
  - WWE Year-End Awards (2 times)
    - Best Reunion (2018) – with Dean Ambrose and Seth Rollins as The Shield
    - Hottest Rivalry (2018) – vs. Brock Lesnar
  - Bumpy Award (1 time)
    - Superstar of the Half-Year (2021)

=== Other awards and honors ===
- NCAA First-team All-ACC (2006)

== See also ==
- List of gridiron football players who became professional wrestlers
