= Escambia High School =

Location
- 1310 North 65th Avenue; Pensacola, Florida 32506; United States; 30°25′37″N 87°17′57″W

Information
- Type: Public
- Motto: We don't hide our Gator pride!
- Established: 1957
- School district: Escambia County School District
- Superintendent: Keith Leonard
- Principal: Dana Boddy
- Staff: 56.95 (FTE)
- Enrollment: 1,654 (2023–2024)
- Student to teacher ratio: 29.04
- Colors: Navy; Orange
- Team name: Gators
- Newspaper: Gator Gazette
- Yearbook: The Escambian
- Stadium: Emmitt Smith Field
- Website: Escambia High School

Escambia High School (EHS) is a public high school located in Pensacola, Florida. It is one of seven high schools in the Escambia County School District.

== History ==
Escambia High School opened for the 1957–58 school year. Its first graduating class in 1959 was composed of 207 students. A large number of the first EHS students came from Pensacola High School.

=== Mascot riots ===
Escambia High School was forcibly desegregated in 1969. Several racially motivated demonstrations at the then-newly school occurred between 1972 and 1977. These demonstrations involved figures such as local civil rights activist Rev. H.K Matthews and the Ku Klux Klan.

Since the school's integration, Black students frequently protested Escambia's "Rebel" mascot (modeled after the University of Mississippi's "Colonel Reb"), the use of Dixie as the school's official song, and the flying of the Confederate flag at school events.

On July 24, 1973, a United States District Court ruling deemed the school's use of these symbols to be "racially irritating" and barred their use at Escambia. However, the Escambia County School District successfully appealed the decision in 1975.

The school board victory led to calls for a return of the Rebel nickname, and increased tensions within the school. The tension culminated in 1976 with a riot that resulted in four students being shot. It was estimated that three-quarters of Escambia's students at the time were involved in the riot. Shortly thereafter, a member of the Pensacola-Escambia Human Relations Commission and State Representative R. W. Peaden's homes were destroyed by arson. Due to the escalating violence, the Florida Highway Patrol and numerous local law enforcement agencies patrolled the school until the end of the year. In the spring of 1977, after hearing the court's final decision that the "Rebels" nickname would not be reinstated, students chose "Gators" as the permanent nickname.

On July 13, 1977, the Ku Klux Klan petitioned the Escambia County School District to hold a meeting at EHS. The Escambia student body president argued against the petition before the board, which ultimately voted 5-1 to reject the Klan's petition.

The legacy of the mascot riots is a continued source of tension at Escambia. In 2018, citing concerns about potential plagiarism, school staff removed a section from that year's yearbook which discussed the history of the riots.

== Extracurricular programs ==
=== Marching band ===
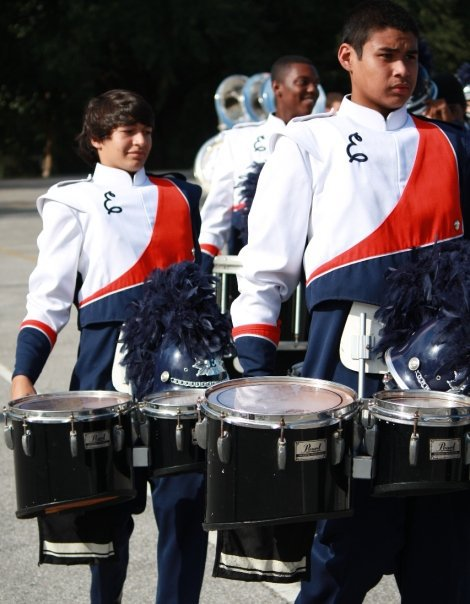
Escambia High School Band Tenor Drummers, 2011

Escambia's marching band is known as "The Pride". In 2024, the band was invited to Washington, D.C. to perform for the American Veterans Center's National Memorial Day Concert Series.

=== NJROTC program ===
Established in 1967, Escambia's Naval Junior Reserve Officer Training Corps (NJROTC) program is one of the oldest such programs in the United States. The program's "Gator Elite Battalion" has received several local, regional, and national commendations, and was named the "Most Outstanding Unit in the Nation" in 2014.

== Notable alumni ==
| Name | Class year | Notability | Reference(s) |
|---|---|---|---|
| Joe Anoa'i | 2003 | CFL player and WWE wrestler, competes under the ring name Roman Reigns, two-time WWE Universal Champion, four-time WWE World Heavyweight Champion, one-time WWE Tag Team Champion (along with Seth Rollins), former WWE United States Champion, former WWE Intercontinental Champion. | |
| Bill Butler | | NFL player | |
| Jacob Copeland | 2018 | NFL player | |
| Joe Durant | 1982 | Pro Golfer | |
| Jonathan and Joshua Fatu | 2003 | Twin brothers and WWE wrestlers, compete under the ring names Jimmy and Jey Uso respectively, two-time WWE Tag Team Champions, five-time WWE SmackDown Tag Team Champions | |
| Preston Hanna | 1972 | MLB player | |
| Reggie Johnson | 1986 | NFL player | |
| Waymond Jordan | 2023 | College football player | |
| Jim Presley | 1979 | MLB player | |
| Trent Richardson | 2009 | College football player, 2011 All-American, 2011 Heisman Trophy finalist, two time BCS National Champion, 2011 Doak Walker Award Winner, third overall pick in the 2012 NFL draft. | |
| Ahtyba Rubin | 2004 | NFL player | |
| Kevin Saucier | 1974 | MLB player | |
| Emmitt Smith | 1987 | NFL player, all-time leading rusher in NFL history. | |
| Emory Smith | 1992 | NFL player | |
| Ken Wright | 1964 | MLB player | |
