= George Crumbley =

American sports executive (1923–2009)

George Pierre Crumbley Jr. (June 15, 1923 – September 15, 2009) was the founder of the Peach Bowl, an American annual college football postseason game.

Crumbley was without national television for the initial Peach Bowl, held in 1968. After being rebuffed by ABC, NBC, and CBS, he turned to Vic Piano, founder of the Mizlou Television Network, then a fledgling independent TV network. Mizlou televised the game as its first major sporting event and eventually became the leading independent TV network in the 1970s and 1980s.

Crumbley headed the Peach Bowl for 18 years. The George P. Crumbley Trophy, awarded to the winner of the game, is named for him.
