= 1993 Peach Bowl (December) =

American college football game

- 26th Peach Bowl
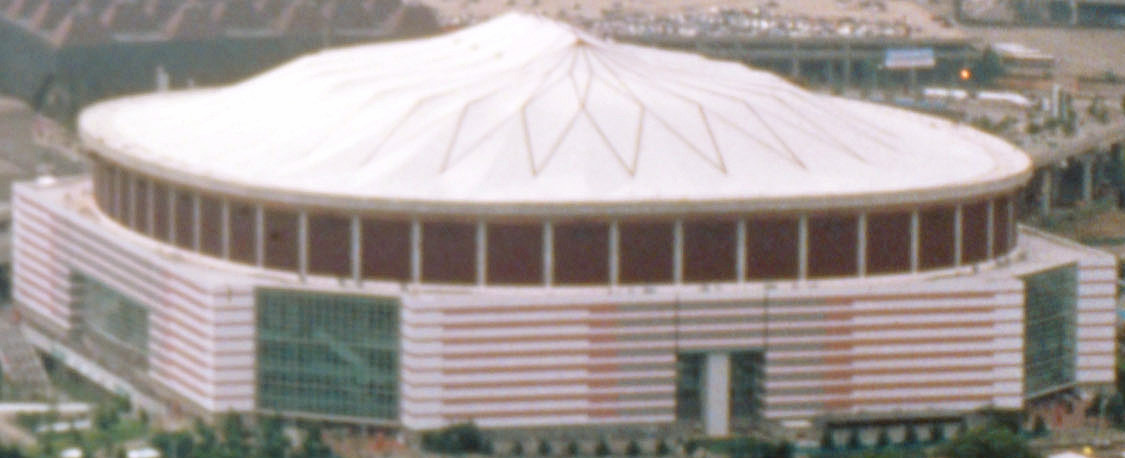
- The Georgia Dome in Atlanta, Georgia, hosted the Peach Bowl.
Kentucky Wildcats	Clemson Tigers
(6–5)	(8–3)
SEC	ACC
13	14
Head coach: Bill Curry	Head coach: Tommy West
	AP / Coaches / BC; 24 / 23 / 24
	1	2	3	4	Total
Kentucky	0	3	0	10	13
Clemson	7	0	0	7	14
- Date: December 31, 1993
- Season: 1993
- Stadium: Georgia Dome
- Location: Atlanta, Georgia
- MVP: Emory Smith
- Favorite: Clemson favored by 2
- Referee: Al Hynes (Big East)
- Attendance: 63,416

United States TV coverage
- Network: ESPN

The 1993 Peach Bowl matched the Kentucky Wildcats of the Southeastern Conference and the Clemson Tigers of the Atlantic Coast Conference. Clemson entered the game at 8–3 and ranked #24 in the AP poll after being ranked as high as #21 during the season; Kentucky was 6–5 and unranked. Clemson was favored by 2 points. The teams' last meeting had been in 1985, with Kentucky winning 26–7.

Kentucky fielded the opening kickoff and drove down field to the Clemson 2-yard line. Kentucky quarterback Pookie Jones threw a pass to receiver Alfonzo Browning and Browning stretched to put the ball across the goal line for a touchdown. Replays showed that Browning scored but this was before college football's instant replay rule and the official ruling of a fumble stood. Clemson took over on its own 1-yard line and marched 99 yards (15 running plays, 3 passing plays) for a 2-yard touchdown run by running back Emory Smith and a 7–0 lead.

Kentucky was stopped again on the Clemson 1-yard line before scoring its first points in the second quarter on a 34-yard field goal by Nicky Nickels.

After a scoreless third quarter Kentucky took a 10–7 lead when Jones threw a 5-yard touchdown pass to Mark Chatmon. A 26-yard field goal by Nickels gave Kentucky a 13–7 lead, and Dan Ariza's 55-yard punt pinned Clemson at its own 18-yard line. Clemson quarterback Patrick Sapp completed a screen pass to Smith for a 57-yard gain. With less than one minute on the clock Sapp threw an interception to Kentucky linebacker Marty Moore but Moore, instead of downing the ball so that the Wildcats could run out the clock, attempted a return and fumbled the ball away, with Clemson recovering. Sapp then threw a 21-yard touchdown pass to Terry Smith and the PAT gave Clemson a 14–13 lead. With only 20 seconds remaining Kentucky took over on offense but could not advance past the Wildcats' 40-yard line.

Clemson's Emory Smith was named the game's MVP.

Kentucky had 20 first downs to Clemson's 14, and 139 rushing yards (on 34 carries, 4.1 yards per carry) to Clemson's 119 (on 46 carries, 2.6 yards per carry). Kentucky completed 16 of 32 passes for 154 yards; Clemson completed 8 of 16 passes for 129 yards. Clemson threw three interceptions, Kentucky none; Kentucky fumbled twice, losing both, while Clemson recovered its only fumble. Kentucky had 293 yards of total offense; Clemson, 248. Kentucky was penalized 4 times for 35 yards, Clemson 10 times for 75 yards. Kentucky punted 5 times (40.6 average), Clemson 6 (38.8 average).

Clemson's Smith had 45 yards rushing and 1 touchdown on 8 attempts; Moe Williams had 58 yards on 13 attempts.

Clemson finished the season with a record of 9–3 and a final ranking at #23 in the AP poll and #22 in the coaches' poll. Kentucky finished at 6–6 and unranked. The following season saw a reversal of fortune for both programs as Clemson finished 5–6 and Kentucky finished 1-10.

The two programs met again in the 2006 Music City Bowl.

== Sources ==
- 2001 Kentucky Wildcats Football Media Guide, '1993 Peach Bowl', p. 168
