= Emory Smith =

American football player (born 1974)

No. 18, 22
- Position: Fullback

Personal information
- Born: May 21, 1974 (age 52); Pensacola, Florida, U.S.
- Listed height: 6 ft 0 in (1.83 m)
- Listed weight: 245 lb (111 kg)

Career information
- High school: Pensacola (FL) Escambia
- College: Clemson
- NFL draft: 1997: undrafted

Career history
- Green Bay Packers (1997)*; Dallas Cowboys (1997)*; Green Bay Packers (1997–1998)*; Scottish Claymores (1999)
- * Offseason or practice squad member only

Emory Gerald Smith (born May 21, 1974) is an American former football fullback. He was a member of the Scottish Claymores in NFL Europe. He played college football at Clemson University.

== Early life ==
Smith attended Escambia High School. In football, he was a two-way player at fullback and linebacker.

As a senior, he tallied 1,001 rushing yards and 13 touchdowns. He was ranked as the seventh-best fullback in the country by recruiting analysts.

== College career ==
Smith accepted a football scholarship from Clemson University. As a redshirt freshman, he collected 89 carries for 387 yards (4.3-yard avg.), 2 rushing touchdowns and 4 receptions for 74 yards. He was named the offensive MVP of the 1993 Peach Bowl, after registering 8 carries for 45 yards (5.6-yard avg.), one rushing touchdown and a 57 yard reception.

As a sophomore, he had 44 carries for 145 yards (3.3-yard avg.), 3 rushing touchdowns and 3 receptions for 18 yards.

As a junior, he was named the starter at fullback, posting 145 carries for 712 yards (4.9-yard avg.), 14 rushing touchdowns (tied for second in school history), 6 receptions for 31 yards, one receiving touchdown and 15 total touchdowns (tied for second in school history). His best game came in the 38–17 win against the University of South Carolina, when he had 12 carries for 101 yards (8.42-yard avg.), scored 2 touchdowns, and had one run of 54 yards in which he dragged one member of the Gamecock secondary 6 yards on his back.

As a senior, he was limited by injuries, collecting 80 carries for 324 yards (4.1-yard avg.), 6 rushing touchdowns and 2 receptions for 25 yards. He finished his college career with 358 carries for 1,568 yards (4.4-yard avg.), 25 rushing touchdowns, 15 receptions for 148 yards and one receiving touchdown.

== Professional career ==
=== Green Bay Packers ===
Smith was signed as an undrafted free agent by the Green Bay Packers after the 1997 NFL draft on April 25. He was waived on August 19, 1997.

=== Dallas Cowboys ===
On October 22, 1997, he was signed to the Dallas Cowboys' practice squad, reuniting with his brother Emmitt Smith.

=== Green Bay Packers (second stint) ===
On December 30, 1997, he was signed to the Green Bay Packers' practice squad for the playoffs, when he became a free agent, seven days after the end of the season.

On January 28, 1998, he was re-signed by the Packers. On August 30, 1998, he was waived with an injury settlement, after suffering a serious hamstring injury in the last preseason game against the Miami Dolphins.

=== Scottish Claymores ===
In 1999, he signed with the Scottish Claymores of NFL Europe. He posted 5 carries for 25 yards and 3 receptions for 20 yards.

== Personal life ==
Smith brother is Hall of Fame running back Emmitt Smith.

== See also ==
- List of family relations in American football
