= Rob Healy =

American football player and banker (born 1964)

Robert Patrick "Rob" Healy (born April 13, 1964) is a private equity professional and former military officer and American football player. Born in California, he graduated from the U.S. Military Academy with a B.S. degree in 1986. While there, he played quarterback for Army and was the MVP of the 1985 Peach Bowl. CPT Healy served nine years in the military and participated in the United States invasion of Panama in 1989, where he was decorated for valor in combat. He later graduated from the Harvard Business School and now is a founder and Managing Partner of L Squared Capital Partners. Previously, Rob co-founded and was a managing partner with Chicago Growth Partners, a large leverage buyout firm in Chicago. Before then, Healy was formerly a partner with ClearLight Partners, another private equity firm. In 2000, he was a principal with William E. Simon & Sons.

He is also the President of the Army Football Club.
