= New Mexico Lobos football statistical leaders =

The New Mexico Lobos football statistical leaders are individual statistical leaders of the New Mexico Lobos football program in various categories, including passing, rushing, receiving, total offense, defensive stats, and kicking. Within those areas, the lists identify single-game, single-season, and career leaders. The Lobos represent the University of New Mexico in the NCAA's Mountain West Conference.

Although New Mexico began competing in intercollegiate football in 1892, the school's official record book considers the "modern era" to have begun in 1946. Records from before this year are often incomplete and inconsistent, and they are generally not included in these lists.

These lists are dominated by more recent players for several reasons:

- Since 1946, seasons have increased from 10 games to 11 and then 12 games in length.
- The NCAA didn't allow freshmen to play varsity football until 1972 (with the exception of the World War II years), allowing players to have four-year careers.
- Bowl games only began counting toward single-season and career statistics in 2002. The Lobos have played in seven bowl games since this decision, giving many recent players an extra game to accumulate statistics.

These lists are updated through the end of the 2021 season.

== Passing ==
=== Passing yards ===
Career
| Rk | Player | Yards | Years |
|---|---|---|---|
| 1 | Stoney Case | 9,460 | 1991 1992 1993 1994 |
| 2 | Jeremy Leach | 9,382 | 1988 1989 1990 1991 |
| 3 | Donovan Porterie | 6,756 | 2006 2007 2008 2009 |
| 4 | Casey Kelly | 5,686 | 2000 2001 2002 2003 |
| 5 | Graham Leigh | 4,979 | 1996 1997 1998 |
| 6 | Billy Rucker | 3,890 | 1983 1984 1985 1986 |
| 7 | Donald Sellers | 3,741 | 1995 1996 |
| 8 | Steve Myer | 3,604 | 1974 1975 |
| 9 | Brad Wright | 3,364 | 1977 1978 1979 1980 |
| 10 | Kole McKamey | 3,359 | 2003 2004 2005 2006 |

Single season
| Rk | Player | Yards | Year |
|---|---|---|---|
| 1 | Jeremy Leach | 3,573 | 1989 |
| 2 | Barry Garrison | 3,163 | 1987 |
| 3 | Stoney Case | 3,117 | 1994 |
| 4 | Donovan Porterie | 3,006 | 2007 |
| 5 | Devon Dampier | 2,768 | 2024 |
| 6 | Graham Leigh | 2,608 | 1998 |
| 7 | Steve Myer | 2,501 | 1975 |
| 8 | Stoney Case | 2,490 | 1993 |
| 9 | Jack Layne | 2,486 | 2025 |
| 10 | Billy Rucker | 2,475 | 1985 |

Single game
| Rk | Player | Yards | Year | Opponent |
|---|---|---|---|---|
| 1 | Jeremy Leach | 622 | 1989 | Utah |
| 2 | Billy Rucker | 490 | 1986 | San Diego State |
| 3 | Billy Rucker | 458 | 1985 | Wyoming |
| 4 | Brad Wright | 452 | 1978 | Texas Tech |
| 5 | Jeremy Leach | 427 | 1991 | Hawaii |
| 6 | Barry Garrison | 408 | 1987 | Hawaii |
| | Casey Kelly | 408 | 2003 | UNLV |
| 8 | Ned James | 406 | 1986 | Wyoming |
| 9 | Stoney Case | 403 | 1994 | TCU |
| 10 | Stoney Case | 393 | 1991 | Air Force |

=== Passing touchdowns ===
Career
| Rk | Player | TDs | Years |
|---|---|---|---|
| 1 | Stoney Case | 67 | 1991 1992 1993 1994 |
| 2 | Jeremy Leach | 49 | 1988 1989 1990 1991 |
| 3 | Graham Leigh | 42 | 1996 1997 1998 |
| 4 | Casey Kelly | 36 | 2000 2001 2002 2003 |
| 5 | Donovan Porterie | 33 | 2006 2007 2008 2009 |
| 6 | Steve Myer | 28 | 1974 1975 |
| 7 | David Osborn | 24 | 1979 1980 1981 1982 |
| 8 | Noel Mazzone | 22 | 1975 1976 1977 1978 |
| 9 | Donald Sellers | 21 | 1995 1996 |
| | Kole McKamey | 21 | 2003 2004 2005 2006 |

Single season
| Rk | Player | TDs | Year |
|---|---|---|---|
| 1 | Graham Leigh | 24 | 1997 |
| 2 | Jeremy Leach | 22 | 1989 |
| | Stoney Case | 22 | 1994 |
| 4 | Steve Myer | 21 | 1975 |
| 5 | Stoney Case | 18 | 1992 |
| | Graham Leigh | 18 | 1998 |
| 7 | Barry Garrison | 17 | 1987 |
| | Stoney Case | 17 | 1993 |
| 9 | David Osborn | 15 | 1982 |
| | Donovan Porterie | 15 | 2007 |

Single game
| Rk | Player | TDs | Year | Opponent |
|---|---|---|---|---|
| 1 | Stoney Case | 6 | 1994 | BYU |
| 2 | Steve Myer | 4 | 1975 | Arizona |
| | Ned James | 4 | 1986 | New Mexico State |
| | Jeremy Leach | 4 | 1989 | Utah |
| | Stoney Case | 4 | 1992 | New Mexico State |
| | Stoney Case | 4 | 1993 | New Mexico State |
| | Stoney Case | 4 | 1993 | Utah |
| | Fred Schweer | 4 | 1993 | UTEP |
| | Donald Sellers | 4 | 1995 | New Mexico State |
| | Donald Sellers | 4 | 1996 | Northern Arizona |
| | Graham Leigh | 4 | 1997 | Tulsa |
| | Graham Leigh | 4 | 1998 | Utah State |
| | Casey Kelly | 4 | 2002 | Wyoming |
| | Tevaka Tuioti | 4 | 2018 | Incarnate Word |
| | Sheriron Jones | 4 | 2018 | Liberty |
| | Sheriron Jones | 4 | 2018 | UNLV |
| | Dylan Hopkins | 4 | 2023 | Tennessee Tech |
| | Jack Layne | 4 | 2025 | New Mexico State |

== Rushing ==
=== Rushing yards ===
Career
| Rk | Player | Yards | Years |
|---|---|---|---|
| 1 | DonTrell Moore | 4,973 | 2002 2003 2004 2005 |
| 2 | Mike Williams | 3,862 | 1975 1976 1977 1978 |
| 3 | Rodney Ferguson | 3,564 | 2004 2005 2006 2007 2008 |
| 4 | Winslow Oliver | 3,332 | 1992 1993 1994 1995 |
| 5 | Kasey Carrier | 3,233 | 2009 2010 2012 2013 |
| 6 | Teriyon Gipson | 3,148 | 2013 2014 2015 2016 |
| 7 | Fred Henry | 2,935 | 1970 1971 1972 |
| 8 | Jhurell Pressley | 2,725 | 2012 2013 2014 2015 |
| 9 | Tyrone Owens | 2,672 | 2015 2016 2017 2018 |
| 10 | Willie Turral | 2,520 | 1982 1983 1984 1985 |

Single season
| Rk | Player | Yards | Year |
|---|---|---|---|
| 1 | Kasey Carrier | 1,469 | 2012 |
| 2 | DonTrell Moore | 1,450 | 2003 |
| 3 | DonTrell Moore | 1,298 | 2005 |
| 4 | Teriyon Gipson | 1,269 | 2016 |
| 5 | Mike Williams | 1,240 | 1976 |
| 6 | Rodney Ferguson | 1,234 | 2006 |
| 7 | Jacory Croskey-Merritt | 1,190 | 2023 |
| 8 | Rodney Ferguson | 1,177 | 2007 |
| 9 | Devon Dampier | 1,166 | 2024 |
| 10 | DonTrell Moore | 1,134 | 2002 |

Single game
| Rk | Player | Yards | Year | Opponent |
|---|---|---|---|---|
| 1 | Kasey Carrier | 338 | 2012 | Air Force |
| 2 | Kasey Carrier | 291 | 2013 | UTEP |
| 3 | Quincy Wright | 265 | 2002 | Weber State |
| 4 | DonTrell Moore | 242 | 2003 | Colorado State |
| 5 | Mike Williams | 236 | 1977 | UTEP |
| 6 | Jacory Croskey-Merritt | 233 | 2023 | Utah State |
| 7 | Reginal Johnson | 232 | 1996 | Tulsa |
| 8 | David Bookert | 218 | 1968 | Wyoming |
| | Fred Henry | 218 | 1971 | Utah |
| 10 | Teriyon Gipson | 217 | 2016 | Wyoming |

=== Rushing touchdowns ===
Career
| Rk | Player | TDs | Years |
|---|---|---|---|
| 1 | DonTrell Moore | 51 | 2002 2003 2004 2005 |
| 2 | Jhurell Pressley | 35 | 2012 2013 2014 2015 |
| 3 | Rodney Ferguson | 34 | 2004 2005 2006 2007 2008 |
| 4 | Teriyon Gipson | 32 | 2013 2014 2015 2016 |
| 5 | Stoney Case | 31 | 1991 1992 1993 1994 |
| 6 | Willie Turral | 29 | 1982 1983 1984 1985 |
| 7 | Mike Williams | 27 | 1975 1976 1977 1978 |
| 8 | Kasey Carrier | 26 | 2009 2010 2012 2013 |
| 9 | Richard McQuarley | 25 | 2015 2016 |
| 10 | Jhurell Pressley | 24 | 2012 2013 2014 2015 |

Single season
| Rk | Player | TDs | Year |
|---|---|---|---|
| 1 | DonTrell Moore | 19 | 2003 |
| | Devon Dampier | 19 | 2024 |
| 3 | Richard McQuarley | 18 | 2016 |
| 4 | Jacory Croskey-Merritt | 17 | 2023 |
| 5 | Kasey Carrier | 15 | 2012 |
| 6 | Stoney Case | 14 | 1993 |
| | DonTrell Moore | 14 | 2005 |
| 8 | Sam Scarber | 13 | 1970 |
| | Rocky Long | 13 | 1971 |
| | DonTrell Moore | 13 | 2002 |
| | Rodney Ferguson | 13 | 2007 |
| | Rodney Ferguson | 13 | 2008 |
| | Teriyon Gipson | 13 | 2016 |

Single game
| Rk | Player | TDs | Year | Opponent |
|---|---|---|---|---|
| 1 | Richard McQuarley | 5 | 2017 | Air Force |
| | Reginal Johnson | 5 | 1996 | Tulsa |
| 2 | Ahmari Davis | 4 | 2018 | New Mexico State |
| | Rocky Long | 4 | 1971 | Utah |
| | Willie Turral | 4 | 1985 | Utah |
| | Stoney Case | 4 | 1993 | Idaho State |
| | DonTrell Moore | 4 | 2003 | Texas State |
| | Rodney Ferguson | 4 | 2007 | Sacramento State |
| | Kasey Carrier | 4 | 2012 | Texas State |
| | Kasey Carrier | 4 | 2013 | UTEP |
| | Ahmari Davis | 4 | 2018 | New Mexico State |

== Receiving ==
=== Receptions ===
Career
| Rk | Player | Rec | Years |
|---|---|---|---|
| 1 | Terance Mathis | 263 | 1985 1986 1987 1989 |
| 2 | Carl Winston | 202 | 1990 1991 1992 1993 |
| 3 | Travis Brown | 182 | 2004 2005 2006 2007 |
| 4 | Marcus Smith | 153 | 2004 2005 2006 2007 |
| 5 | Preston Dennard | 142 | 1974 1975 1976 1977 |
| 6 | Mike Henderson | 141 | 1987 1988 1989 1990 |
| 7 | Hank Baskett | 140 | 2002 2003 2004 2005 |
| 8 | Eric Morgan | 136 | 1989 1990 |
| 9 | Ty Kirk | 134 | 2009 2010 2011 2012 |
| | Luke Wysong | 134 | 2021 2022 2023 2024 |

Single season
| Rk | Player | Rec | Year |
|---|---|---|---|
| 1 | Marcus Smith | 91 | 2007 |
| 2 | Terance Mathis | 88 | 1989 |
| 3 | Eric Morgan | 80 | 1990 |
| 4 | Carl Winston | 76 | 1991 |
| | Travis Brown | 76 | 2007 |
| 6 | Terance Mathis | 73 | 1987 |
| 7 | Pascal Volz | 69 | 1997 |
| | Luke Wysong | 69 | 2024 |
| 9 | Ace Hendricks | 67 | 1967 |
| | Hank Baskett | 67 | 2005 |

Single game
| Rk | Player | Rec | Year | Opponent |
|---|---|---|---|---|
| 1 | Emilio Vallez | 17 | 1967 | UTEP |
| 2 | Terance Mathis | 16 | 1989 | Utah |
| 3 | Ace Hendricks | 14 | 1967 | Utah |
| | Shane Hall | 14 | 1987 | Wyoming |
| | Terance Mathis | 14 | 1987 | Arkansas |
| 6 | Ty Kirk | 13 | 2011 | New Mexico State |
| 7 | Terance Mathis | 12 | 1986 | San Diego State |
| | Kano Brown | 12 | 1989 | San Diego State |
| | Eric Morgan | 12 | 1990 | New Mexico State |

=== Receiving yards ===
Career
| Rk | Player | Yards | Years |
|---|---|---|---|
| 1 | Terance Mathis | 4,254 | 1985 1986 1987 1989 |
| 2 | Carl Winston | 2,972 | 1990 1991 1992 1993 |
| 3 | Hank Baskett | 2,288 | 2002 2003 2004 2005 |
| 4 | Preston Dennard | 2,257 | 1974 1975 1976 1977 |
| 5 | Travis Brown | 2,192 | 2004 2005 2006 2007 |
| 6 | Dwight Counter | 2,101 | 2000 2001 2002 2003 |
| 7 | Marcus Smith | 2,073 | 2004 2005 2006 2007 |
| 8 | Mike Henderson | 1,927 | 1987 1988 1989 1990 |
| 9 | Eric Morgan | 1,806 | 1989 1990 |
| 10 | Ricky Martin | 1,798 | 1976 1977 1978 1979 1980 |

Single season
| Rk | Player | Yards | Year |
|---|---|---|---|
| 1 | Terance Mathis | 1,315 | 1989 |
| 2 | Pascal Volz | 1,229 | 1997 |
| 3 | Carl Winston | 1,177 | 1991 |
| 4 | Terance Mathis | 1,132 | 1987 |
| 5 | Marcus Smith | 1,125 | 2007 |
| 6 | Ace Hendricks | 1,094 | 1967 |
| 7 | Hank Baskett | 1,071 | 2005 |
| 8 | Eric Morgan | 1,043 | 1990 |
| 9 | Travis Brown | 1,031 | 2007 |
| 10 | Preston Dennard | 962 | 1975 |

Single game
| Rk | Player | Yards | Year | Opponent |
|---|---|---|---|---|
| 1 | Emilio Vallez | 257 | 1967 | UTEP |
| 2 | Terance Mathis | 252 | 1989 | Utah |
| 3 | Terance Mathis | 238 | 1986 | Wyoming |
| 4 | Terance Mathis | 214 | 1987 | Arkansas |
| 5 | Hank Baskett | 209 | 2005 | Missouri |
| | Deon Long | 209 | 2011 | Sam Houston State |
| 7 | Ace Hendricks | 195 | 1967 | BYU |
| 8 | Terance Mathis | 191 | 1987 | Utah |
| 9 | Terance Mathis | 188 | 1986 | San Diego State |
| 10 | Terance Mathis | 187 | 1989 | Texas Tech |

=== Receiving touchdowns ===
Career
| Rk | Player | TDs | Years |
|---|---|---|---|
| 1 | Terance Mathis | 36 | 1985 1986 1987 1989 |
| 2 | Hank Baskett | 17 | 2002 2003 2004 2005 |
| 3 | Preston Dennard | 16 | 1974 1975 1976 1977 |
| | Ricky Martin | 16 | 1977 1978 1979 1980 |
| 5 | Carl Winston | 14 | 1990 1991 1992 1993 |
| | Dwight Counter | 14 | 2000 2001 2002 2003 |
| 7 | Pascal Volz | 13 | 1996 1997 |
| | Marcus Smith | 13 | 2004 2005 2006 2007 |
| 9 | Mike Henderson | 12 | 1987 1988 1989 1990 |
| | Eric Morgan | 12 | 1989 1990 |
| | Travis Brown | 12 | 2004 2005 2006 2007 |

Single season
| Rk | Player | TDs | Year |
|---|---|---|---|
| 1 | Terance Mathis | 13 | 1989 |
| | Pascal Volz | 13 | 1997 |
| 3 | Terance Mathis | 10 | 1986 |
| 4 | Don Black | 9 | 1958 |
| | Mike Henderson | 9 | 1990 |
| | Hank Baskett | 9 | 2005 |
| | Marcus Smith | 9 | 2006 |
| 8 | Ricky Martin | 8 | 1980 |
| | Terance Mathis | 8 | 1987 |
| 10 | Carl Winston | 7 | 1991 |
| | Martinez Williams | 7 | 1998 |

Single game
| Rk | Player | TDs | Year | Opponent |
|---|---|---|---|---|
| 1 | Ricky Martin | 3 | 1980 | Utah |
| | Terance Mathis | 3 | 1986 | Colorado State |
| | Mike Henderson | 3 | 1990 | BYU |
| | Zack Wesley | 3 | 1994 | BYU |
| | Pascal Volz | 3 | 1997 | Rice |
| | Pascal Volz | 3 | 1997 | TCU |
| | Hank Baskett | 3 | 2005 | Missouri |
| | Marcus Smith | 3 | 2006 | New Mexico State |
| | Deon Long | 3 | 2011 | Sam Houston State |

== Total offense ==
Total offense is the sum of passing and rushing statistics. It does not include receiving or returns.

=== Total offense yards ===
Career
| Rk | Player | Yards | Years |
|---|---|---|---|
| 1 | Stoney Case | 10,651 | 1991 1992 1993 1994 |
| 2 | Jeremy Leach | 8,623 | 1988 1989 1990 1991 |
| 3 | Donovan Porterie | 6,715 | 2006 2007 2008 2009 |
| 4 | Casey Kelly | 6,285 | 2000 2001 2002 2003 |
| 5 | Graham Leigh | 5,847 | 1996 1997 1998 |
| 6 | Donald Sellers | 4,992 | 1995 1996 |
| 7 | Devon Dampier | 4,787 | 2023 2024 |
| 8 | Billy Rucker | 4,489 | 1983 1984 1985 1986 |
| 9 | Rocky Long | 4,461 | 1969 1970 1971 |
| 10 | David Osborn | 4,404 | 1979 1980 1981 1982 |

Single season
| Rk | Player | Yards | Year |
|---|---|---|---|
| 1 | Devon Dampier | 3,934 | 2024 |
| 2 | Stoney Case | 3,649 | 1994 |
| 3 | Jeremy Leach | 3,363 | 1989 |
| 4 | Barry Garrison | 3,065 | 1987 |
| 5 | Donovan Porterie | 2,972 | 2007 |
| 6 | Graham Leigh | 2,904 | 1998 |
| 7 | Billy Rucker | 2,857 | 1985 |
| 8 | Graham Leigh | 2,846 | 1997 |
| 9 | Stoney Case | 2,819 | 1993 |
| 10 | Donald Sellers | 2,805 | 1996 |

Single game
| Rk | Player | Yards | Year | Opponent |
|---|---|---|---|---|
| 1 | Jeremy Leach | 594 | 1989 | Utah |
| 2 | Ned James | 514 | 1986 | Wyoming |
| 3 | Billy Rucker | 501 | 1986 | San Diego State |
| 4 | Billy Rucker | 487 | 1985 | Wyoming |
| 5 | Stoney Case | 464 | 1994 | TCU |
| 6 | Brad Wright | 440 | 1978 | Texas Tech |
| 7 | Tevaka Tuioti | 414 | 2018 | New Mexico State |
| 8 | Stoney Case | 413 | 1994 | Colorado State |
| 9 | Casey Kelly | 410 | 2003 | UNLV |
| 10 | Devon Dampier | 405 | 2024 | Fresno State |

=== Total touchdowns ===
Career
| Rk | Player | TDs | Years |
|---|---|---|---|
| 1 | Stoney Case | 98 | 1991 1992 1993 1994 |
| 2 | Jeremy Leach | 53 | 1988 1989 1990 1991 |
| | Graham Leigh | 53 | 1996 1997 1998 |
| 4 | DonTrell Moore | 51 | 2002 2003 2004 2005 |
| 5 | Casey Kelly | 45 | 2000 2001 2002 2003 |
| 6 | Devon Dampier | 41 | 2023 2024 |
| 7 | Donald Sellers | 39 | 1995 1996 |
| 8 | David Osborn | 37 | 1979 1980 1981 1982 |
| | Lamar Jordan | 37 | 2014 2015 2016 2017 |

Single season
| Rk | Player | TDs | Year |
|---|---|---|---|
| 1 | Stoney Case | 33 | 1994 |
| 2 | Graham Leigh | 32 | 1997 |
| 3 | Stoney Case | 31 | 1993 |
| | Devon Dampier | 31 | 2024 |
| 5 | Jeremy Leach | 24 | 1989 |
| 6 | Steve Myer | 23 | 1975 |

== Defense ==
=== Interceptions ===
Career
| Rk | Player | Ints | Years |
|---|---|---|---|
| 1 | Jay Morrison | 15 | 1969 1970 |
| | Randy Rich | 15 | 1972 1973 1974 1975 |
| 3 | Sharay Fields | 14 | 1978 1979 1980 |
| | Gabriel Fulbright | 14 | 2002 2003 2004 2005 |
| 5 | Chuck Roberts | 12 | 1957 1958 1959 |
| | Ron Wallace | 12 | 1973 1974 1975 |
| | Max Hudspeth | 12 | 1974 1975 1976 1977 |
| 8 | Larry White | 11 | 1951 1952 1953 1954 |
| | Ray Hornfeck | 11 | 1981 1982 1983 1984 |
| | Ramos McDonald | 11 | 1996 1997 |

Single season
| Rk | Player | Ints | Year |
|---|---|---|---|
| 1 | Sharay Fields | 10 | 1979 |
| 2 | Jay Morrison | 9 | 1969 |
| 3 | Max Hudspeth | 7 | 1976 |
| | Doug Smith | 7 | 1978 |
| 5 | Chuck Roberts | 6 | 1959 |
| | Jay Morrison | 6 | 1970 |
| | Ron Wallace | 6 | 1973 |
| | Randy Rich | 6 | 1975 |
| | Ramos McDonald | 6 | 1996 |
| | Stephen Persley | 6 | 2001 |
| | Brandon Payne | 6 | 2004 |

Single game
| Rk | Player | Ints | Year | Opponent |
|---|---|---|---|---|
| 1 | Sharay Fields | 4 | 1979 | New Mexico State |
| 2 | Chuck Roberts | 3 | 1959 | Montana |
| | Eddie Stokes | 3 | 1963 | Montana |
| | Jay Morrison | 3 | 1969 | San Jose State |
| | Gabriel Fulbright | 3 | 2003 | San Diego State |

=== Tackles ===
Career
| Rk | Player | Tackles | Years |
|---|---|---|---|
| 1 | Johnny Jackson | 483 | 1981 1982 1983 1984 |
| 2 | Blake Irwin | 474 | 1994 1995 1996 1997 |
| 3 | Carmen Messina | 454 | 2008 2009 2010 2011 |
| 4 | Brian Urlacher | 442 | 1996 1997 1998 1999 |
| 5 | Robin Cole | 406 | 1973 1974 1975 1976 |
| 6 | Dakota Cox | 402 | 2013 2014 2015 2016 |
| 7 | Dave Thompson | 394 | 1974 1975 1976 |
| 8 | Jimmie Carter | 389 | 1980 1981 1982 1983 |
| 9 | Houston Ross | 371 | 1969 1970 1971 |
| 10 | Mike Forrest | 362 | 1976 1977 1978 1979 |

Single season
| Rk | Player | Tackles | Year |
|---|---|---|---|
| 1 | Brian Urlacher | 178 | 1998 |
| 2 | Dave Thompson | 176 | 1976 |
| 3 | Mike Forrest | 162 | 1978 |
| | Carmen Messina | 162 | 2009 |
| 5 | Houston Ross | 157 | 1970 |
| 6 | Brian Urlacher | 154 | 1999 |
| 7 | Johnny Jackson | 152 | 1981 |
| 8 | Ray Wilson | 151 | 1993 |
| 9 | Houston Ross | 150 | 1969 |
| 10 | Tuli Mateialona | 148 | 1993 |

=== Sacks ===
Career
| Rk | Player | Sacks | Years |
|---|---|---|---|
| 1 | Johnny Jackson | 44.0 | 1981 1982 1983 1984 |
| 2 | Robin Cole | 36.0 | 1973 1974 1975 1976 |
| 3 | Charlie Baker | 30.0 | 1977 1978 1979 |
| | John Bell | 30.0 | 1987 1988 1989 1990 |
| 5 | Michael Tuohy | 20.5 | 2004 2005 2006 2007 |
| 6 | Jimmie Carter | 20.0 | 1980 1981 1982 1983 |
| 7 | John Wingate | 19.0 | 1994 1995 1996 1997 |
| 8 | Robert Rumbaugh | 17.0 | 1977 1978 1979 |
| 9 | Daniel Kegler | 16.0 | 2001 2002 2003 |
| 10 | Jesse Becton | 15.5 | 1991 1992 |

Single season
| Rk | Player | Sacks | Year |
|---|---|---|---|
| 1 | Robin Cole | 17.0 | 1975 |
| 2 | Johnny Jackson | 15.0 | 1982 |
| 3 | Jesse Becton | 14.5 | 1992 |
| 4 | Johnny Jackson | 14.0 | 1981 |
| 5 | Bob Shupryt | 13.0 | 1980 |
| 6 | Charlie Baker | 12.0 | 1978 |
| | Steve Vaipulu | 12.0 | 1990 |
| 8 | Ryan Taylor | 11.0 | 1997 |
| 9 | Brian Johnson | 9.5 | 2000 |
| | Johnathan Rainey | 9.5 | 2009 |

Single game
| Rk | Player | Sacks | Year | Opponent |
|---|---|---|---|---|
| 1 | John Bell | 4.0 | 1988 | Akron |
| | Michael Tuohy | 4.0 | 2006 | New Mexico State |

== Kicking ==
=== Field goals made ===
Career
| Rk | Player | FGs | Years |
|---|---|---|---|
| 1 | David Margolis | 53 | 1989 1990 1991 1992 |
| 2 | Luke Drzewiecki | 51 | 2022 2023 2024 2025 |
| 3 | James Aho | 45 | 2008 2009 2010 2011 |
| 4 | Bob Berg | 41 | 1973 1974 1975 |
| | Colby Cason | 41 | 1995 1996 1997 |
| 6 | Kenny Byrd | 33 | 2002 2004 2005 2006 |
| 7 | Wes Zunker | 29 | 2001 2002 2003 2004 |
| | John Sullivan | 29 | 2004 2005 2006 2007 |
| 9 | Andrew Shelley | 28 | 2018 2019 2020 2021 |
| 10 | Vladimir Borombozin | 27 | 2000 2001 |

Single season
| Rk | Player | FGs | Year |
|---|---|---|---|
| 1 | John Sullivan | 29 | 2007 |
| 2 | Colby Cason | 21 | 1997 |
| 3 | Kenny Byrd | 19 | 2006 |
| 4 | Bob Berg | 18 | 1974 |
| | Bob Berg | 18 | 1975 |
| | James Aho | 18 | 2008 |
| | Luke Drzewiecki | 18 | 2025 |
| 8 | Vladimir Borombozin | 17 | 2001 |
| 9 | David Margolis | 15 | 1989 |
| | Wes Zunker | 15 | 2003 |

Single game
| Rk | Player | FGs | Year | Opponent |
|---|---|---|---|---|
| 1 | Bob Berg | 5 | 1975 | Fresno State |
| 2 | Rick Walsh | 5 | 1988 | New Mexico State |
| 3 | Colby Cason | 5 | 1997 | SMU |

=== Field goal percentage ===
Career
| Rk | Player | FG% | Years |
|---|---|---|---|
| 1 | John Sullivan | 82.9% | 2004 2005 2006 2007 |
| 2 | Vladimir Borombozin | 81.8% | 2000 2001 |
| 3 | Kenny Byrd | 80.5% | 2002 2004 2005 2006 |
| 4 | Luke Drzewiecki | 78.5% | 2022 2023 2024 2025 |
| 5 | Rick Walsh | 75.0% | 1987 1988 |
| 6 | Andrew Shelley | 73.7% | 2018 2019 2020 2021 |
| 7 | Bob Berg | 73.2% | 1973 1974 1975 |
| 8 | Jason Sanders | 71.4% | 2014 2015 2016 2017 |
| 9 | Wes Zunker | 70.7% | 2001 2002 2003 2004 |
| 10 | Colby Cason | 68.3% | 1995 1996 1997 |

Single season
| Rk | Player | FG% | Year |
|---|---|---|---|
| 1 | Luke Drzewiecki | 94.7% | 2025 |
| 2 | Vladimir Borombozin | 94.4% | 2001 |
| 3 | Jason Sanders | 92.3% | 2016 |
| 4 | James Aho | 88.9% | 2010 |
| 5 | Wes Zunker | 88.2% | 2003 |
| 6 | Kenny Byrd | 86.7% | 2005 |
| 7 | John Sullivan | 82.9% | 2007 |
| 8 | Kenny Byrd | 82.6% | 2006 |
