= 2007 New Mexico Bowl =

American college football game

Nevada Wolf Pack	New Mexico Lobos
(6–6)	(8–4)
WAC	Mountain West
0	23
Head coach: Chris Ault	Head coach: Rocky Long
	1	2	3	4	Total
Nevada	0	0	0	0	0
New Mexico	14	6	0	3	23
- Date: December 22, 2007
- Season: 2007
- Stadium: University Stadium
- Location: Albuquerque, New Mexico
- MVP: QB Donovan Porterie, New Mexico; LB Brett Madsen, New Mexico
- Favorite: New Mexico by 3½
- Referee: Greg Burks (Big 12)
- Attendance: 30,223
- Payout: US$750,000 per team

United States TV coverage
- Network: ESPN
- Announcers: Dave Barnett, Rod Gilmore and Dave Ryan
- Nielsen ratings: 1.96

The 2007 New Mexico Bowl was a post–season American college football bowl game held on December 22, 2007 at University Stadium on the University of New Mexico campus in Albuquerque, New Mexico as part of the 2007–08 NCAA bowl season. The game, telecast on ESPN, featured the Nevada Wolf Pack from the WAC and the hometown New Mexico Lobos from the Mountain West Conference.

The Lobos topped the Wolf Pack 23–0 to earn their first bowl win since the 1961 Aviation Bowl, a 45–year drought that was the fifth-longest in the nation. Another streak ended in the game with the shutout of Nevada being the Wolf Pack's first since 1980. New Mexico quarterback Donovan Porterie made up for a poor 2006 New Mexico Bowl performance with two touchdown tosses and kicker John Sullivan tacked on three long field goals in the win.

== Game summary ==
=== First Quarter ===
New Mexico received the opening kickoff to begin the game. The kick was returned 27 yards and New Mexico began the first offensive drive of the game from its own 29-yard line. After two short plays, New Mexico quarterback Donovan Porterie threw short pass to the right side of the field that turned into a 66–yard reception by wide receiver Marcus Smith, who eluded the Nevada defenders for a touchdown. The score gave the Lobos an early 7–0 lead with 13:38 remaining in the quarter. The play was Smith's longest reception of the season. On their first offensive possession, Nevada began operations at its own 25–yard line after a short kickoff return. Nevada proved unable to earn a first down and after just three plays was forced to punt the ball away. Punter Zachary Whited kicked the ball 47 yards and New Mexico took over on its 23–yard line to begin its second offensive possession of the game.

The Lobo offense began with a five-yard false start penalty but were helped by a 10–yard holding penalty against Nevada that gave New Mexico an automatic first down. Two plays later, the Lobos connected on a 22–yard pass that took them into Nevada territory. Three incomplete passes later, New Mexico was forced to punt after failing to pick up another first down. Punter Jordan Scott kicked the ball 35 yards, pinning Nevada at their own 10 to begin their second offensive drive. On the second play, quarterback Colin Kaepernick connected with Marko Mitchell for Nevada's first first down of the game, a 16–yard pass. Two consecutive false start penalties, however, pushed the Nevada offense back 10 yards and prevented Nevada from gaining another first down. Nevada's 47–yard punt was returned 15 yards and New Mexico began with good field position at its own 46–yard line with 6:00 remaining in the quarter.

On the second play of the drive, Nevada's defense got its first big break of the game as New Mexico receiver Roland Bruno fumbled the ball after catching a short pass. Nevada's defense recovered the fumble and Nevada was able to take over on offense in New Mexico territory. The Wolf Pack offense continued to struggle, however and failed to pick up a first down after the turnover. Nevada again punted the ball away. The kick rolled into the end zone for a touchback and New Mexico began at its 20–yard line. The first play of the drive resulted in a 23–yard completion to Travis Brown. A screen pass two plays later went for 21 yards and the Lobos again penetrated into Nevada territory. A false start penalty set the New Mexico offense back five yards, but two plays later, Porterie connected on 39–yard touchdown to Travis Brown. The touchdown came with 2:22 remaining in the quarter and gave New Mexico a 14–0 lead over Nevada.

Nevada began its final drive of the first quarter from its own 30–yard line desperately needing to score in order to keep the game from getting out of hand. As before, however, Nevada struggled to advance the ball. Wolf Pack quarterback Colin Kaepernick was forced to convert two third-down plays to keep the drive alive. As time ran out in the quarter, Nevada faced a second–and–12 situation on the New Mexico 41–yard line.

At the end of the first quarter, New Mexico led 14–0. Nevada had struggled on offense throughout the quarter, but had begun to put together what was then its longest drive of the game as time ran out.

=== Second Quarter ===
In the middle of its best drive thus far, Nevada completed a short pass but was stopped for a loss on the next play. Electing to attempt the fourth-down conversion, quarterback Colin Kaepernick kept the ball on a quarterback scramble but was pushed out of bounds one yard short of the first down. New Mexico took over on offense following the turnover on downs and again began to move the ball down the field. At midfield, New Mexico quarterback Donovan Porterie attempted to throw the ball deep but was intercepted by Nevada's Justin Jackson. After the interception, Nevada took over on its own 31–yard line. The Nevada offense picked up two first downs but two consecutive penalties on third down nullified two separate first-down plays and Nevada was again forced to punt.

New Mexico took over at its 28–yard line with 9:13 remaining in the second quarter. A steady Lobo rushing attack picked up yards and first downs on the ground and New Mexico moved the ball downfield with success. After crossing into Nevada territory, however, the Lobos began to run into difficulty. Inside the Pack 40–yard line, Nevada forced a stop after Porterie was sacked for a 6-yard loss. All-American kicker John Sullivan came into the game to attempt a career–long 53–yard field goal for New Mexico. Sullivan, who had played the entire season with a torn anterior cruciate ligament in his left (plant) leg, completed the kick, thus giving the Lobos a 17–0 lead with 5:55 remaining in the first half.

Taking over at their own 25–yard line following the post-score kickoff, Nevada had just under six minutes to score before halftime. Any hope of doing just that, however, quickly came to an end as the Pack's first four plays resulted in –1 yards and a punt. Following the kick which came with 4:19 remaining in the half, New Mexico now had a chance to expand their lead before halftime. A 20–yard completion to tight end Chris Mark put the Lobos in position to do just that but New Mexico failed to earn a second first down. John Sullivan was sent in to attempt another field goal, this time a 45–yarder which was also successfully converted. The kick allowed Sullivan to tie an NCAA record for consecutive games with multiple field goals and gave New Mexico a 20–0 lead with 2:48 before halftime.

Taking over at their 18–yard line following the kickoff, Nevada had another chance to put points on the board before halftime. Wolf Pack wide receiver Marko Mitchell caught a 13–yard pass for a first down and the Nevada rushing game picked up another. Mitchell then caught a 24–yard pass to put Nevada on the New Mexico 34–yard line, their deepest penetration of the first half. Two plays later, however, Nevada running back Brandon Fragger fumbled the ball which was recovered by the New Mexico defense with 46 seconds remaining in the half. The New Mexico offense took advantage of the opportunity, advancing the ball in five plays to the Nevada two–yard line. With seven seconds remaining, the Lobos failed to complete a touchdown pass and sent in John Sullivan to attempt a 20–yard field goal with three seconds remaining in the half.

Sullivan's kick was blocked by Kenny Viser of Nevada, denying New Mexico the field goal before the half. Despite the special teams breakthrough, Nevada trailed New Mexico 20–0 at halftime.

=== Third Quarter ===
Because New Mexico received the opening kickoff, Nevada received the ball to begin the second half. On the return, New Mexico's leading defensive tackler Ian Clark separated his shoulder and did not return to the game. Despite the loss of Clark on defense, New Mexico was still able to stop Nevada from gaining a first down. During the stop, however, the Lobos lost yet another defensive player Blake Ligon to a broken rib. Following a Nevada punt, New Mexico took over on offense at its 28–yard line. On the first New Mexico play of the second half, running back Paul Baker broke through the defensive line of Nevada for a 37–yard run, driving New Mexico deep into Nevada territory. Though successful on that play and on several subsequent plays, New Mexico committed a 15–yard personal foul penalty that prevented the Lobos from gaining another first down. John Sullivan came out to attempt a 44–yard field goal but the kick was blocked just as his kick at the end of the first half had been. Nevada recovered the blocked kick, returning it to the New Mexico 44–yard line where the Wolf Pack offense took over with over 10 minutes remaining in the quarter.

Despite the excellent field position, Nevada was again unable to gain a first down. New Mexico's defense earned a quarterback sack and forced the Pack to punt the ball away. The kick rolled into the end zone for a touchback and the Lobo offense took over at its 20–yard line. A holding penalty against New Mexico pushed back the New Mexico offense and the Lobos were forced to punt after going three–and–out. Nevada took over at its 35–yard line but was also unable to move the ball and punted it again. On the first play after taking over at its 20–yard lane, the New Mexico offense got its second big play of the second half as Roland Bruno hauled in a 58–yard pass to drive the Lobos deep into Nevada territory. On the next play, Paul Baker ran for 24 yards to drive New Mexico inside the Nevada four–yard line. There, the Lobos' offense ran into a brick wall as the Nevada defense stopped New Mexico on four straight plays to keep the Lobos out of the end zone. New Mexico, which chose to try to complete the fourth–and–goal play instead of kicking a field goal, was denied points and turned the ball over to Nevada on downs with 2:30 remaining in the quarter.

Though Nevada had managed a stop on fourth–and–short, its offense was now pinned inside its one–yard line. After picking up a first down, Nevada had emerged from the shadow of its end zone. A 10–yard holding penalty on the next play pushed the Wolf Pack back towards their goal line, however, and quarterback Colin Kaepernick was unable to pick up another first down. As time ran out in the third quarter, Nevada failed to convert a third–and–18.

After a scoreless third quarter, New Mexico still led Nevada 20–0. Nevada's offense continued to have difficulty moving the ball. Despite losing their best and sixth–best tacklers, the New Mexico defense completely contained the Wolf Pack offense and kept Nevada from scoring.

=== Fourth Quarter ===
The fourth quarter began with Nevada punting out of its own end zone, the ninth Nevada punt of the game. New Mexico's O.J. Swift returned the kick to the Nevada 33–yard line, where the Lobo offense began work. Despite excellent field position, New Mexico's offense fared no better than Nevada's and was pushed back after gaining just one first down. Kicker John Sullivan was called upon but missed a 43–yard field goal try. Sullivan had only missed three kicks during the entire 2007 regular season but with 11:57 remaining in the game, his third miss of the 2007 New Mexico Bowl left New Mexico scoreless on yet another possession. Despite that fact, the Lobos continued to hold on to their 20–0 lead.

After taking over at their own 26–yard line, Nevada managed to complete a 21–yard pass for a first down. After that play, however, the Nevada offense reverted to the pattern of ineptitude it had displayed throughout the game. Unable to earn another first down, Nevada was forced into its 10th punt of the game, a 37–yard kick that forced New Mexico back to its 17–yard line. New Mexico proceeded to run several rushing plays in order to run down the clock and give Nevada less time for any potential comeback. Eventually stopped and forced to punt the ball away, New Mexico's offense was granted new life after Nevada committed a 15–yard roughing the kicker penalty that gave New Mexico an automatic first down on fourth down. New Mexico's clock–draining drive continued inside the Nevada red zone. The Wolf Pack defense was able to gain another defensive stop but New Mexico had advanced within the field goal range of John Sullivan who nailed a 37–yard attempt with 4:18 remaining to give New Mexico a 23–0 lead.

With little time remaining and with Nevada facing more than a three–touchdown deficit, the Wolf Pack had little chance to win. Despite that fact, the Nevada offense had one more chance to score and avoid a shutout. Three consecutive passes fell incomplete and Nevada punted the ball away for the 11th time. With three and a half minutes remaining, New Mexico took over on offense and proceeded to run out the clock and win the bowl game.

=== Scoring summary ===
Quarter	1	2	3	4	Total
Nevada	0	0	0	0	0
New Mexico	14	6	0	3	23

at University Stadium, Albuquerque, New Mexico

- Date: December 22, 2007
- Game time: 4:30 p.m. EST
- 1st Quarter
  - NM – Marcus Smith 66–yard pass from Donovan Porterie (John Sullivan kick), 13:38. New Mexico 7–0. Drive: 3 plays, 71 yards, 1:22.
  - NM – Travis Brown 39–yard pass from Donovan Porterie (John Sullivan kick), 02:22. New Mexico 14–0. Drive: 5 plays, 80 yards, 1:55.
- 2nd Quarter
  - NM – John Sullivan 53–yard field goal, 06:07. New Mexico 17–0. Drive: 9 plays, 37 yards, 3:06.
  - NM – John Sullivan 45–yard field goal, 02:48. New Mexico 20–0. Drive: 6 plays, 25 yards, 1:31.
- 4th Quarter
  - NM – John Sullivan 37–yard field goal, 04:18. New Mexico 23–0. Drive: 12 plays, 61 yards, 5:14.

== Game notes ==
- New Mexico's 23-0 victory was its first bowl victory in 46 years, the last victory coming in December 1961 when the Lobos won the only edition of the Aviation Bowl.
- New Mexico became the 89th different team to win a bowl game since Notre Dame's last bowl game win.
- The Nevada loss marked the first time the Wolf Pack had been shut out since 1980, a 330-game streak that was the longest such streak in the NCAA at that time.
- During the game, defensive end Michael Tuhoy set the Mountain West Conference career sacks record.
- The Lobos' bowl win drought was the fifth-longest in the Division I Football Bowl Subdivision. Northwestern holds the longest streak; its last win was in the 1949 Rose Bowl.
- Paul Baker got the start at running back, as the usual starter was declared academically ineligible.
- Nevada's last five bowl games before this one were decided by three points or fewer.
- Both school nicknames relate to the wolf family.
- Nevada joined New Mexico in the Mountain West Conference in 2012 after the Western Athletic Conference announced that it was discontinuing their football program.
