= 1985 San Diego State Aztecs football team =

American college football season

1985 San Diego State Aztecs football
- Conference: Western Athletic Conference
- Record: 5–6–1 (3–4–1 WAC)
- Head coach: Doug Scovil (5th season)
- Offensive scheme: West Coast
- Base defense: 4–3
- Home stadium: Jack Murphy Stadium

1985 Western Athletic Conference football standings
	Conf.					Overall
Team	W		L		T	W		L		T
No. 8 Air Force +	7	–	1	–	0	12	–	1	–	0
No. 16 BYU +	7	–	1	–	0	11	–	3	–	0
Utah	5	–	3	–	0	8	–	4	–	0
Hawaii	4	–	3	–	1	4	–	6	–	2
Colorado State	4	–	4	–	0	5	–	7	–	0
San Diego State	3	–	4	–	1	5	–	6	–	1
New Mexico	2	–	6	–	0	3	–	8	–	0
Wyoming	2	–	6	–	0	3	–	8	–	0
UTEP	1	–	7	–	0	1	–	10	–	0
+ – Conference co-champions; Rankings from AP Poll

The 1985 San Diego State Aztecs football team represented San Diego State University as a member of the Western Athletic Conference (WAC) during the 1985 NCAA Division I-A football season. Led by Doug Scovil in his fifth and final year as head coach, the Aztecs compiled an overall record of 5–6–1 with a mark of 3–4–1 conference play, placing sixth in the WAC. San Diego State played home games at Jack Murphy Stadium in San Diego.

== Schedule ==
Date	Opponent	Site	Result	Attendance	Source
September 14	Long Beach State*	Jack Murphy Stadium; San Diego, CA	W 34–14	30,866	
September 21	at No. 12 UCLA*	Rose Bowl; Pasadena, CA	L 16–34	54,625	
September 28	Colorado State	Jack Murphy Stadium; San Diego, CA	W 48–23	14,755	
October 5	Stanford*	Jack Murphy Stadium; San Diego, CA	W 41–22	30,822	
October 12	at No. 11 BYU	Cougar Stadium; Provo, UT	L 0–28	65,407	
October 19	Utah^{†}	Jack Murphy Stadium; San Diego, CA	L 37–39	22,474	
October 26	Oregon*	Jack Murphy Stadium; San Diego, CA	L 37–49	15,432	
November 2	at No. 7 Air Force	Falcon Stadium; Colorado Springs, CO	L 10–31	36,503	
November 9	at Wyoming	War Memorial Stadium; Laramie, WY	L 20–41	1,946	
November 16	UTEP	Jack Murphy Stadium; San Diego, CA	W 34–6	10,786	
November 23	New Mexico	Jack Murphy Stadium; San Diego, CA	W 55–20	10,343	
November 30	at Hawaii	Aloha Stadium; Halawa, HI	T 10–10	40,316	
*Non-conference game; ^{†}Homecoming; Rankings from AP Poll released prior to the game

== Team players in the NFL ==
The following were selected in the 1986 NFL draft.

Player	Position	Round	Overall	NFL team
Webster Slaughter	Wide receiver	2	43	Cleveland Browns
Dan Knight	Tackle	4	198	Green Bay Packers
Vince Warren	Wide receiver	5	130	New York Giants

The following finished their college career in 1985, were not drafted, but played in the NFL.

Player	Position	First NFL team
Chris Davis	Linebacker	1987 New York Giants
Jim Laughton	Tight end	1986 Seattle Seahawks

== Team awards ==
Award	Player
Most Valuable Player (John Simcox Memorial Trophy)	Webster Slaughter
Outstanding Offensive & Defensive Linemen (Byron H. Chase Memorial Trophy)	Doug Aronson, Off; Todd Richards, Def
Team captains Dr. R. Hardy / C.E. Peterson Memorial Trophy	Casey Brown, Off; Dan Knight, Off; Mike Stevens, Def; LeRoy Wardell, Def
Most Inspirational Player	Jack Eaton
