= 1986 Wyoming Cowboys football team =

American college football season

1986 Wyoming Cowboys football
- Conference: Western Athletic Conference
- Record: 6–6 (4–4 WAC)
- Head coach: Dennis Erickson (1st season)
- Offensive coordinator: Bob Bratkowski (1st season)
- Offensive scheme: Single-back spread
- Defensive coordinator: John L. Smith (1st season)
- Base defense: 4–3
- Home stadium: War Memorial Stadium

1986 Western Athletic Conference football standings
	Conf.					Overall
Team	W		L		T	W		L		T
San Diego State $	7	–	1	–	0	8	–	4	–	0
BYU	6	–	2	–	0	8	–	5	–	0
Air Force	5	–	2	–	0	6	–	5	–	0
Hawaii	4	–	4	–	0	7	–	5	–	0
Colorado State	4	–	4	–	0	6	–	5	–	0
Wyoming	4	–	4	–	0	6	–	6	–	0
New Mexico	2	–	5	–	0	4	–	8	–	0
UTEP	2	–	6	–	0	4	–	8	–	0
Utah	1	–	7	–	0	2	–	9	–	0
$ – Conference champion

The 1986 Wyoming Cowboys football team represented the University of Wyoming in the 1986 NCAA Division I-A football season. A charter member of the Western Athletic Conference (WAC), Wyoming played its home games in War Memorial Stadium, an outdoor facility on campus in Laramie, Wyoming.

Led by first-year head coach Dennis Erickson in his only season at Wyoming, the Cowboys compiled a 6–6 record (4–4 against conference opponents), and finished sixth in the WAC. The team outscored their opponents 299 to 272. Erickson installed his "Air Express" form of the spread offense and led the Cowboys to 3–1 start in September, with road wins at Air Force and Wisconsin.

Hired in early December 1985, Erickson was previously the head coach for four seasons at the University of Idaho. His four-year contract at Wyoming included a base annual salary of $60,000 plus $20,000 from radio and television, and the rent-free use of a home in Laramie. The Cowboys had previously run the wishbone and were 3–8 in 1985, tied for seventh in the nine-team WAC.

After the season in early January 1987, Erickson left Wyoming without notice to return to the Palouse as head coach at Washington State University in Pullman.

== Schedule ==
Date	Opponent	Site	Result	Attendance	Source
September 6	No. 12 Baylor*	War Memorial Stadium; Laramie, WY	L 28–31	20,542	
September 13	Pacific (CA)*	War Memorial Stadium; Laramie, WY	W 23–20	15,403	
September 20	at Air Force	Falcon Stadium; Colorado Springs, CO	W 23–17	48,749	
September 27	at Wisconsin*	Camp Randall Stadium; Madison, WI	W 21–12	64,954	
October 4	at Iowa State*	Cyclone Stadium; Ames, IA	L 10–21	39,710	
October 11	Utah	War Memorial Stadium; Laramie, WY	W 38–14	12,326	
October 18	at BYU	Cougar Stadium; Provo, UT	L 22–34	31,742	
October 25	at Colorado State	Hughes Stadium; Fort Collins, CO (rivalry)	L 15–20	31,856	
November 1	New Mexico	War Memorial Stadium; Laramie, WY	W 35–25	6,714	
November 8	UTEP	War Memorial Stadium; Laramie, WY	W 41–12	7,250	
November 15	at San Diego State	Jack Murphy Stadium; San Diego, CA	L 24–31	20,168	
November 29	at Hawaii	Aloha Stadium; Halawa, HI (rivalry)	L 19–35	40,383	
*Non-conference game; Rankings from AP Poll released prior to the game
