= 1986 San Diego State Aztecs football team =

American college football season

1986 San Diego State Aztecs football

WAC champion

Holiday Bowl, L 38–39 vs. Iowa
- Conference: Western Athletic Conference
- Record: 8–4 (7–1 WAC)
- Head coach: Denny Stolz (1st season)
- Offensive coordinator: Dana Bible (1st season)
- Offensive scheme: Pro-style
- Defensive coordinator: Tim McConnell (1st season)
- Base defense: 4–3
- Home stadium: Jack Murphy Stadium

1986 Western Athletic Conference football standings
	Conf.					Overall
Team	W		L		T	W		L		T
San Diego State $	7	–	1	–	0	8	–	4	–	0
BYU	6	–	2	–	0	8	–	5	–	0
Air Force	5	–	2	–	0	6	–	5	–	0
Hawaii	4	–	4	–	0	7	–	5	–	0
Colorado State	4	–	4	–	0	6	–	5	–	0
Wyoming	4	–	4	–	0	6	–	6	–	0
New Mexico	2	–	5	–	0	4	–	8	–	0
UTEP	2	–	6	–	0	4	–	8	–	0
Utah	1	–	7	–	0	2	–	9	–	0
$ – Conference champion

The 1986 San Diego State Aztecs football team represented San Diego State University as a member of the Western Athletic Conference (WAC) during the 1986 NCAA Division I-A football season. Led by first-year head coach Denny Stolz, the Aztecs compiled an overall record of 8–4 with a mark of 7–1 conference play, winning the WAC title. San Diego State earned a berth in the Holiday Bowl, where the Aztecs lost to Iowa. The team played home games at Jack Murphy Stadium in San Diego.

== Schedule ==
Date	Opponent	Site	TV	Result	Attendance	Source
September 6	Long Beach State*	Jack Murphy Stadium; San Diego, CA		W 27–24	23,594	
September 13	at Utah	Robert Rice Stadium; Salt Lake City, UT		W 37–30	35,982	
September 20	No. 19 UCLA*	Jack Murphy Stadium; San Diego, CA		L 14–45	50,338	
September 27	at New Mexico	University Stadium; Albuquerque, NM		W 38–34	20,579	
October 4	at No. 20 Stanford*	Stanford Stadium; Stanford, CA		L 10–17	36,500	
October 18	at UTEP	Sun Bowl; El Paso, TX		W 15–10	40,109	
October 25	Air Force^{†}	Jack Murphy Stadium; San Diego, CA		L 10–22	27,336	
November 1	at Colorado State	Hughes Stadium; Fort Collins, CO		W 27–26	14,127	
November 15	Wyoming	Jack Murphy Stadium; San Diego, CA		W 31–24	20,168	
November 22	Hawaii	Jack Murphy Stadium; San Diego, CA		W 35–5	23,838	
November 29	BYU	Jack Murphy Stadium; San Diego, CA		W 10–3	45,062	
December 30	No. 16 Iowa*	Jack Murphy Stadium; San Diego, CA (Holiday Bowl)	ESPN	L 38–39	59,473	
*Non-conference game; ^{†}Homecoming; Rankings from AP Poll released prior to the game

== Team players in the NFL ==
The following were selected in the 1987 NFL draft.

Player	Position	Round	Overall	NFL team
Robert Awalt	Tight End	3	62	St. Louis Cardinals

The following finished their college career in 1986, were not drafted, but played in the NFL.

Player	Position	First NFL Team
Doug Aronson	Guard	1987 Cincinnati Bengals
Duane Pettitt	Defensive End	1987 San Diego Chargers
Mike Ariey	Tackle	1989 Green Bay Packers
Randy Kirk	Linebacker	1987 San Diego Chargers
Renard Young	Defensive Back	1987 Seattle Seahawks
Richard Brown	Linebacker	1987 Los Angeles Rams

== Team awards ==
Award	Player
Most Valuable Player (John Simcox Memorial Trophy)	Todd Santos
Outstanding Offensive & Defensive Linemen (Byron H. Chase Memorial Trophy)	Doug Aronson, Off; Levi Esene, Def
Team captains Dr. R. Hardy / C.E. Peterson Memorial Trophy	Corey Gilmore, Off; Doug Aronson, Off; Levi Esene, Def
Most Inspirational Player	Mike Ariey
