= Graham Leigh =

American football player (born 1975)

Profile
- Position: Quarterback

Personal information
- Born: May 10, 1975 (age 51); Omaha, Nebraska, U.S.
- Listed height: 6 ft 1 in (1.85 m)
- Listed weight: 212 lb (96 kg)

Career information
- High school: Dobson (Mesa, Arizona)
- College: New Mexico
- NFL draft: 1999: undrafted

Career history
- Arizona Cardinals (1999)*; Rhein Fire (2000)*; Birmingham Bolts (2001)
- * Offseason or practice squad member only

Awards and highlights
- WAC Mountain Division Offensive Player of the Year (1997); 2× First-team All-WAC (1997, 1998)

Graham Leigh (born May 10, 1975) is an American former football quarterback who played for the Birmingham Thunderbolts of the XFL.

== College career ==
=== Pacific ===
In 1994, Leigh joined Pacific, where he redshirted the 1994 season. In 1995, Leigh appeared in seven games for the Tigers during their last season in the programs history. The school struggled to a 3–8 record while Leigh completed 76-of-150 passes for 958 yards with seven touchdowns to six interceptions. Leigh then transferred to New Mexico.

=== New Mexico ===
Leigh was eligible to play during 1996 season because the Tigers program was eliminated. Leigh spent the season as the backup quarterback to Donald Sellers and saw limited playing time. In 1997, Leigh led the Lobos to a 9–3 record and an appearance in the WAC Championship Game. He set the program record with 24 touchdown passes and a passer efficiency rating of 153.6. For his play, he was named Western Athletic Conference Offensive Player of the Year. He also led the Lobos to its first bowl appearance since the 1961 season. In the 1997 Insight.com Bowl, Leigh threw and ran for a touchdown as the Lobos were defeated by Arizona 20–14.

In 1998, Leigh and the Lobos started off 2–0, but would drop nine of its final 10 games to finish the season 3–9. Leigh led the WAC with passes attempted (376), touchdowns thrown (18) and average passing yards per game (217.3).

=== Statistics ===
Season	Team	Games			Passing								Rushing			
Season	Team	GP	GS	Record	Cmp	Att	Pct	Yds	Y/A	TD	Int	Rtg	Att	Yds	Avg	TD
1994	Pacific	Redshirted (redshirt)														
1995	Pacific	7	?	?−?	76	150	50.7	958	6.4	7	6	111.7	41	97	2.4	1
1996	New Mexico	11	0	—	3	5	60.0	53	10.6	0	2	69.0	3	42	14.0	0
1997	New Mexico	12	12	9−3	166	276	60.1	2,318	8.4	24	8	153.6	135	528	3.9	8
1998	New Mexico	12	12	3−9	198	376	52.7	2,608	6.9	18	17	117.7	111	296	2.7	3
Career		42	?	?−?	443	807	54.9	5,937	7.4	49	33	128.6	290	963	3.3	12
Bowl games		1	1	0–1	12	32	37.5	150	4.7	1	4	62.2	17	79	4.6	1

Bowl games only began counting toward single-season and career statistics in 2002.

- 1997 Insight.com Bowl – 12/32, 150 yards, TD, 4 Int, 17 rushes, 79 yards, TD

== Professional career ==
=== Arizona Cardinals ===
In 1999, Leigh was signed by the Arizona Cardinals. He was released before ever appearing in a game.

=== Rhein Fire ===
In 2000, Leigh was signed by the Rhein Fire of the NFL Europe (NFLE). He was released before ever playing in a game.

=== Birmingham Thunderbolts ===
On October 29, 2000, Leigh was selected in the 19th round (146th overall) of the 2001 XFL draft by the Birmingham Thunderbolts of the XFL. Leigh began the season as the third-string quarterback to Casey Weldon and Jay Barker. Due to injuries of both Weldon and Barker, Leigh made his professional debut in week eight against Chicago. In his debut, Leigh completed 9-of-27 passes for 102 yards and threw three interceptions. Leigh received his first professional start the following week against Orlando. He threw his first touchdown in the first quarter to wide receiver Quincy Jackson on a 9-yard pass. The Bolts and Leigh held an eight-point fourth quarter lead, but ultimately fell to the Rage 29–24. Leigh also started the season finale against New York/New Jersey, but failed to find the endzone in a 22–0 defeat. On the season, Leigh appeared in three games (two starts) and threw for 499 yards and one touchdown to six interceptions.

== XFL statistics ==
Year	Team	Games			Passing								Rushing			
Year	Team	GP	GS	Record	Cmp	Att	Pct	Yds	Y/A	TD	Int	Rtg	Att	Yds	Avg	TD
2001	BIR	3	2	0–2	44	97	45.4	499	5.1	1	6	39.0	2	14	7.0	0
Career		3	2	0–2	44	97	45.4	499	5.1	1	6	39.0	2	14	7.0	0
