= 1985 UTEP Miners football team =

American college football season

1985 UTEP Miners football
- Conference: Western Athletic Conference
- Record: 1–10 (1–7 WAC)
- Head coach: Bill Yung (4th season)
- Offensive coordinator: Hal Mumme (4th season)
- Offensive scheme: Spread
- Defensive coordinator: Denny Doornbos (3rd season)
- Base defense: 3–4
- Home stadium: Sun Bowl

1985 Western Athletic Conference football standings
	Conf.					Overall
Team	W		L		T	W		L		T
No. 8 Air Force +	7	–	1	–	0	12	–	1	–	0
No. 16 BYU +	7	–	1	–	0	11	–	3	–	0
Utah	5	–	3	–	0	8	–	4	–	0
Hawaii	4	–	3	–	1	4	–	6	–	2
Colorado State	4	–	4	–	0	5	–	7	–	0
San Diego State	3	–	4	–	1	5	–	6	–	1
New Mexico	2	–	6	–	0	3	–	8	–	0
Wyoming	2	–	6	–	0	3	–	8	–	0
UTEP	1	–	7	–	0	1	–	10	–	0
+ – Conference co-champions; Rankings from AP Poll

The 1985 UTEP Miners football team was an American football team that represented the University of Texas at El Paso in the Western Athletic Conference during the 1985 NCAA Division I-A football season. In their fourth year under head coach Bill Yung, the team compiled a 1–10 record. Their lone victory against BYU was (by points spread) the fifth biggest upset in college football history since (at least) 1980. They were the final team with a 0–4 record or worse to upset a top 10 AP poll-ranked opponent unitl UCLA in 2025.

== Schedule ==
Date	Opponent	Site	Result	Attendance	Source
August 31	at Air Force	Falcon Stadium; Colorado Springs, CO	L 6–48	38,500	
September 7	at No. 3 SMU*	Texas Stadium; Irving, TX	L 23–35	24,611	
September 14	at Colorado State	Hughes Stadium; Fort Collins, CO	L 24–41	22,781	
September 21	New Mexico State*	Sun Bowl; El Paso, TX (rivalry)	L 20–22	26,810	
September 28	at Utah	Robert Rice Stadium; Salt Lake City, UT	L 19–55	30,745	
October 12	at Kent State*	Dix Stadium; Kent, OH	L 24–51	10,329	
October 26	No. 7 BYU	Sun Bowl; El Paso, TX	W 23–16	22,121	
November 2	New Mexico	Sun Bowl; El Paso, TX	L 23–27	32,849	
November 9	Hawaii^{†}	Sun Bowl; El Paso, TX	L 7–23	12,910	
November 16	San Diego State	Sun Bowl; El Paso, TX	L 6–34	10,876	
December 7	vs. Wyoming	VFL Park; Melbourne, Australia (Australia Bowl)	L 21–23	19,107	
*Non-conference game; ^{†}Homecoming; Rankings from AP Poll released prior to the game

== Roster ==
1985 UTEP Miners football team roster
Players
Coaches
Offense

Pos.	#	Name	Class
TE	81	Arnie Adkison	Fr
QB	15	Sammy Garza	Jr
QB	6	Jeff Remo	So
RB	22	John Harvey	Fr
WR	25	Larry Linne	Sr
TE	87	Bob Keseday	Jr

Defense

Pos.	#	Name	Class
LB	99	Seth Joyner	Sr

Special teams

Pos.	#	Name	Class
K	1	Chris Jacke	So

Head coach

- Bill Yung

Coordinators/assistant coaches

Legend

- (C) Team captain
- (S) Suspended
- (I) Ineligible
- Injured
- Redshirt

== Awards ==
No players were selected to the first or second All-WAC team. Several players were honorable mentions.

Henry Castellanos, punter, honorable mention

John Harvey, running back, honorable mention

Luther Johnson, return specialist, honorable mention

Robert Murray, defensive back, honorable mention

Don Sommer, offensive line, honorable mention

Danny Taylor, defensive back, honorable mention

== NFL draft ==
The 1986 NFL Draft was held at the New York Marriott Marquis in New York City, New York on April 29–30, 1986. Miners who were picked in the 1986 NFL draft:

Round	Pick	Player	Position	NFL team
8	208	Seth Joyner	LB	Philadelphia Eagles
9	238	Danny Taylor	DB	Cleveland Browns
10	256	Don Sommer	OG	Houston Oilers

Additionally, Larry Linne was signed by the New England Patriots as a free agent.
