= 1980 UTEP Miners football team =

American college football season

1980 UTEP Miners football
- Conference: Western Athletic Conference
- Record: 1–11 (1–6 WAC)
- Head coach: Bill Michael (4th season)
- Home stadium: Sun Bowl

1980 Western Athletic Conference football standings
	Conf.					Overall
Team	W		L		T	W		L		T
No. 12 BYU $	6	–	1	–	0	12	–	1	–	0
Colorado State	5	–	1	–	1	6	–	4	–	1
Hawaii	3	–	3	–	0	8	–	3	–	0
Wyoming	4	–	4	–	0	6	–	5	–	0
San Diego State	4	–	4	–	0	4	–	8	–	0
New Mexico	3	–	4	–	0	4	–	7	–	0
Utah	2	–	3	–	1	5	–	5	–	1
Air Force	1	–	3	–	0	2	–	9	–	1
UTEP	1	–	6	–	0	1	–	11	–	0
$ – Conference champion; Rankings from AP Poll

The 1980 UTEP Miners football team was an American football team that represented the University of Texas at El Paso in the Western Athletic Conference during the 1980 NCAA Division I-A football season. In their fourth year under head coach Bill Michael, the team compiled a 1–11 record.

== Schedule ==
Date	Opponent	Site	Result	Attendance	Source
September 6	at Texas Tech*	Jones Stadium; Lubbock, TX	L 7–35	37,122	
September 13	at New Mexico State*	Aggie Memorial Stadium; Las Cruces, NM (rivalry)	L 3–6	24,882	
September 20	North Texas State*	Sun Bowl; El Paso, TX	L 15–35	20,350	
September 27	at Pacific (CA)*	Pacific Memorial Stadium; Stockton, CA	L 14–28	14,203	
October 4	at Hawaii	Aloha Stadium; Halawa, HI	W 34–14	40,421	
October 11	Utah	Sun Bowl; El Paso, TX	L 7–31	19,700	
October 18	at UNLV*	Las Vegas Silver Bowl; Whitney, NV	L 14–53	20,552	
October 25	New Mexico^{†}	Sun Bowl; El Paso, TX	L 21–22	17,008	
November 1	at No. 17 BYU	Cougar Stadium; Provo, UT	L 7–83	36,251	
November 8	at Colorado State	Hughes Stadium; Fort Collins, CO	L 7–37	17,629	
November 15	San Diego State	Sun Bowl; El Paso, TX	L 7–28	1,407	
November 22	Wyoming	Sun Bowl; El Paso, TX	L 7–52	4,327	
*Non-conference game; ^{†}Homecoming; Rankings from AP Poll released prior to the game
