= 1985 Utah Utes football team =

American college football season

1985 Utah Utes football
- Conference: Western Athletic Conference
- Record: 8–4 (5–3 WAC)
- Head coach: Jim Fassel (1st season)
- Offensive coordinator: Jack Reilly (1st season)
- Defensive coordinator: George Wheeler (2nd season)
- Home stadium: Robert Rice Stadium

1985 Western Athletic Conference football standings
	Conf.					Overall
Team	W		L		T	W		L		T
No. 8 Air Force +	7	–	1	–	0	12	–	1	–	0
No. 16 BYU +	7	–	1	–	0	11	–	3	–	0
Utah	5	–	3	–	0	8	–	4	–	0
Hawaii	4	–	3	–	1	4	–	6	–	2
Colorado State	4	–	4	–	0	5	–	7	–	0
San Diego State	3	–	4	–	1	5	–	6	–	1
New Mexico	2	–	6	–	0	3	–	8	–	0
Wyoming	2	–	6	–	0	3	–	8	–	0
UTEP	1	–	7	–	0	1	–	10	–	0
+ – Conference co-champions; Rankings from AP Poll

The 1985 Utah Utes football team represented the University of Utah as a member of the Western Athletic Conference (WAC) during the 1985 NCAA Division I-A football season. In their first season under head coach Jim Fassel, the Utes compiled an overall record of 8–4 with a mark of 5–3 in conference play, finished third in the WAC, and outscored their opponents 405 to 343. Home games were played on campus at Robert Rice Stadium in Salt Lake City.

Utah's statistical leaders included Larry Egger with 2,988 passing yards, Eddie Johnson with 1,018 rushing yards, and Loren Richey with 971 receiving yards.

== Schedule ==
Date	Time	Opponent	Site	Result	Attendance	Source
September 7	7:00 pm	Boise State*	Robert Rice Stadium; Salt Lake City, UT	W 20–17	25,382	
September 14	11:30 pm	at Hawaii	Aloha Stadium; Halawa, HI	W 29–27	46,591	
September 21	7:00 pm	Washington State*	Robert Rice Stadium; Salt Lake City, UT	W 44–37	28,576	
September 28	7:00 pm	UTEP	Robert Rice Stadium; Salt Lake City, UT	W 55–19	30,745	
October 4	7:00 pm	Wyoming	Robert Rice Stadium; Salt Lake City, UT	W 37–20	33,248	
October 12	8:30 pm	at Arizona State*	Sun Devil Stadium; Tempe, AZ	L 27–34	60,777	
October 19	8:00 pm	at San Diego State	Jack Murphy Stadium; San Diego, CA	W 39–37	22,474	
October 26	1:30 pm	at No. 8 Air Force	Falcon Stadium; Colorado Springs, CO	L 15–37	32,269	
November 2	12:00 pm	Utah State*	Robert Rice Stadium; Salt Lake City, UT (Battle of the Brothers)	W 34–7	30,124	
November 9	12:00 pm	New Mexico^{†}	Robert Rice Stadium; Salt Lake City, UT	W 58–49	26,124	
November 16	1:00 pm	at Colorado State	Hughes Stadium; Fort Collins, CO	L 19–21	8,511	
November 23	12:00 pm	at No. 11 BYU	Cougar Stadium; Provo, UT (Holy War)	L 28–38	65,473	
*Non-conference game; ^{†}Homecoming; Rankings from AP Poll released prior to the game; All times are in Mountain time

== Roster ==
1985 Utah Utes football team roster
Players
Coaches
Offense

Pos.	#	Name	Class
OL	74	Dave Cullity	Jr
QB	12	Larry Egger	Jr
WR	81	Carl Harry	Fr
WR	84	Aric Lewis	Sr
RB	33	Eddie Lewis	Sr
TE	80	Craig McEwen	Jr
QB	10	Tim Mitchell	Sr
C	72	Kevin Reach	Sr
WR	9	Terry Shaw	Sr

Defense

Pos.	#	Name	Class
DB	11	Scott Case	Jr
DE	44	Mark Geiselmayr	Jr
LB	46	Filipo Mokofisi	Sr
DL	63	Mark Reckert	Sr
DB	21	Reggie Richardson	Sr
DB	2	Erroll Tucker	Sr

Special teams

Pos.	#	Name	Class

Head coach

- Jim Fassel

Coordinators/assistant coaches

Legend

- (C) Team captain
- (S) Suspended
- (I) Ineligible
- Injured
- Redshirt

== Coaching staff ==
- Jim Fassel, head coach
- Jack Reilly, offensive coordinator quarterbacks coach
- George Wheeler, defensive coordinator, defensive line coach
- Sean McNabb, tight ends coach, special teams coach
- Mark Pierce, defensive ends coach
- Fred Graves, wide receivers coach
- Ron McBride, offensive line coach
- Wayne McQuivey, offensive backs coach
- Dave Kotulski, inside linebackers coach
- Mike Gillhamer, defensive backs coach
- Larry Wilson, assistant defensive line coach

== NFL draft ==
Two Utah players were selected in the 1986 NFL draft, which went 12 rounds with 333 selections.

Player	Position	Round	Pick	NFL team
Erroll Tucker	Defensive back	5	122	Pittsburgh Steelers
Filipo Mokofisi	Linebacker	8	200	New Orleans Saints
