= 1986 Hawaii Rainbow Warriors football team =

American college football season

1986 Hawaii Rainbow Warriors football
- Conference: Western Athletic Conference
- Record: 7–5 (4–4 WAC)
- Head coach: Dick Tomey (10th season)
- Home stadium: Aloha Stadium

1986 Western Athletic Conference football standings
| | Conf. | | | | | Overall |
| Team | W | | L | | T | W | | L | | T |
|---|---|---|---|---|---|---|---|---|---|---|
| San Diego State $ | 7 | – | 1 | – | 0 | 8 | – | 4 | – | 0 |
| BYU | 6 | – | 2 | – | 0 | 8 | – | 5 | – | 0 |
| Air Force | 5 | – | 2 | – | 0 | 6 | – | 5 | – | 0 |
| Hawaii | 4 | – | 4 | – | 0 | 7 | – | 5 | – | 0 |
| Colorado State | 4 | – | 4 | – | 0 | 6 | – | 5 | – | 0 |
| Wyoming | 4 | – | 4 | – | 0 | 6 | – | 6 | – | 0 |
| New Mexico | 2 | – | 5 | – | 0 | 4 | – | 8 | – | 0 |
| UTEP | 2 | – | 6 | – | 0 | 4 | – | 8 | – | 0 |
| Utah | 1 | – | 7 | – | 0 | 2 | – | 9 | – | 0 |
$ – Conference champion

The 1986 Hawaii Rainbow Warriors football team represented the University of Hawaiʻi at Mānoa in the Western Athletic Conference during the 1986 NCAA Division I-A football season. In their tenth season under head coach Dick Tomey, the Rainbow Warriors compiled a 7–5 record.

== Schedule ==
| Date | Opponent | Site | Result | Attendance | Source |
|---|---|---|---|---|---|
| August 30 | at Air Force | Falcon Stadium; Colorado Springs, CO (rivalry) | L 17–24 | 46,242 | |
| September 6 | Wisconsin* | Aloha Stadium; Halawa, HI | W 20–17 | 45,403 | |
| September 20 | UTEP | Aloha Stadium; Halawa, HI | W 31–21 | 46,427 | |
| October 4 | New Mexico | Aloha Stadium; Halawa, HI | W 27–10 | 46,119 | |
| October 18 | at Colorado State | Hughes Stadium; Fort Collins, CO | L 7–31 | 28,310 | |
| October 25 | Cal State Fullerton* | Aloha Stadium; Halawa, HI | W 26–15 | 34,530–40,423 | |
| November 1 | at Utah | Robert Rice Stadium; Salt Lake City, UT | W 33–13 | 26,274 | |
| November 8 | BYU^{†} | Aloha Stadium; Halawa, HI | L 3–10 | 46,485 | |
| November 15 | Fresno State* | Aloha Stadium; Halawa, HI (rivalry) | W 24–13 | 40,487 | |
| November 22 | at San Diego State | Jack Murphy Stadium; San Diego, CA | L 5–35 | 23,838 | |
| November 29 | Wyoming | Aloha Stadium; Halawa, HI (rivalry) | W 35–19 | 40,383 | |
| December 6 | No. 4 Michigan* | Aloha Stadium; Halawa, HI | L 10–27 | 50,000 | |
*Non-conference game; ^{†}Homecoming; Rankings from Coaches' Poll released prior to the game

== Personnel ==
1986 Hawaii Warriors football team roster
Players
Coaches
Offense

| Pos. | # | Name | Class |

Defense

| Pos. | # | Name | Class |
|---|---|---|---|
| LB | | M. L. Johnson | Sr |
| DL | | Al Noga | Jr |

Special teams

| Pos. | # | Name | Class |

Head coach

- Dick Tomey

Coordinators/assistant coaches

- Robert Anae
  (Graduate assistant)

Legend

- (C) Team captain
- (S) Suspended
- (I) Ineligible
- Injured
- Redshirt
