= 1980 Wyoming Cowboys football team =

American college football season

1980 Wyoming Cowboys football
- Conference: Western Athletic Conference
- Record: 6–5 (4–4 WAC)
- Head coach: Pat Dye (1st season)
- Captains: Greg Taylor; Guy Frazier
- Home stadium: War Memorial Stadium

1980 Western Athletic Conference football standings
	Conf.					Overall
Team	W		L		T	W		L		T
No. 12 BYU $	6	–	1	–	0	12	–	1	–	0
Colorado State	5	–	1	–	1	6	–	4	–	1
Hawaii	3	–	3	–	0	8	–	3	–	0
Wyoming	4	–	4	–	0	6	–	5	–	0
San Diego State	4	–	4	–	0	4	–	8	–	0
New Mexico	3	–	4	–	0	4	–	7	–	0
Utah	2	–	3	–	1	5	–	5	–	1
Air Force	1	–	3	–	0	2	–	9	–	1
UTEP	1	–	6	–	0	1	–	11	–	0
$ – Conference champion; Rankings from AP Poll

The 1980 Wyoming Cowboys football team represented the University of Wyoming in the Western Athletic Conference (WAC) during the 1980 NCAA Division I-A football season. Led by first-year head coach Pat Dye, the Cowboys compiled a 6-5 record (4–4 against conference opponents), and finished fifth in the WAC. The Cowboys played their home games on campus at War Memorial Stadium in Laramie, Wyoming.

Dye was previously the head coach for six years at independent East Carolina. After his only season in Laramie, he resigned a month after the season, and was hired in early January at Auburn in the Southeastern Conference.

== Schedule ==
Date	Opponent	Site	Result	Attendance	Source
September 13	Oregon State*	War Memorial Stadium; Laramie, WY	W 30–10	20,113	
September 20	Richmond*	War Memorial Stadium; Laramie, WY	W 35–14	17,000	
September 27	Hawaii	War Memorial Stadium; Laramie, WY (rivalry)	W 45–20	20,883	
October 4	New Mexico	War Memorial Stadium; Laramie, WY	L 21–24	27,778	
October 11	at BYU	Cougar Stadium; Provo, UT	L 17–52	41,296	
October 18	Utah	War Memorial Stadium; Laramie, WY	W 24–21	5,515	
October 25	San Diego State	War Memorial Stadium; Laramie, WY	W 34–9	15,325	
November 1	at Colorado State	Hughes Stadium; Fort Collins, CO (rivalry)	L 25–28	31,087	
November 8	at UNLV*	Las Vegas Silver Bowl; Whitney, NV	L 26–33	20,277	
November 15	at Air Force	Falcon Stadium; Colorado Springs, CO	L 7–25	15,693	
November 22	at UTEP	Sun Bowl; El Paso, TX	W 52–7	4,327	
*Non-conference game
