= 1980 Colorado State Rams football team =

American college football season

1980 Colorado State Rams football
- Conference: Western Athletic Conference
- Record: 6–4–1 (5–1–1 WAC)
- Head coach: Sark Arslanian (8th season)
- Offensive coordinator: Al Sandahl (1st season)
- Defensive coordinator: Chester Caddas (2nd season)
- Home stadium: Hughes Stadium

1980 Western Athletic Conference football standings
	Conf.					Overall
Team	W		L		T	W		L		T
No. 12 BYU $	6	–	1	–	0	12	–	1	–	0
Colorado State	5	–	1	–	1	6	–	4	–	1
Hawaii	3	–	3	–	0	8	–	3	–	0
Wyoming	4	–	4	–	0	6	–	5	–	0
San Diego State	4	–	4	–	0	4	–	8	–	0
New Mexico	3	–	4	–	0	4	–	7	–	0
Utah	2	–	3	–	1	5	–	5	–	1
Air Force	1	–	3	–	0	2	–	9	–	1
UTEP	1	–	6	–	0	1	–	11	–	0
$ – Conference champion; Rankings from AP Poll

The 1980 Colorado State Rams football team was an American football team that represented Colorado State University in the Western Athletic Conference (WAC) during the 1980 NCAA Division I-A football season. In its eighth season under head coach Sark Arslanian, the team compiled a 6–4–1 record (5–1–1 against WAC opponents).

The team's statistical leaders included Steve Fairchild with 2,578 passing yards, Alvin Lewis with 1,047 rushing yards, and Tony Goolsby with 838 receiving yards.

== Schedule ==
Date	Opponent	Site	Result	Attendance	Source
September 6	Air Force	Hughes Stadium; Fort Collins, CO (rivalry)	W 21–9	26,017	
September 13	West Virginia*	Hughes Stadium; Fort Collins, CO	L 24–52	23,972	
September 20	at Arizona*	Arizona Stadium; Tucson, AZ	W 15–13	48,511	
September 27	UNLV*^{†}	Hughes Stadium; Fort Collins, CO	L 15–56	25,972	
October 4	at Iowa State*	Cyclone Stadium; Ames, IA	L 0–69	48,511	
October 11	at New Mexico	University Stadium; Albuquerque, NM	W 31–26	19,154	
October 18	at San Diego State	San Diego Stadium; San Diego, CA	W 26–7	28,050	
October 25	at Utah	Robert Rice Stadium; Salt Lake City, UT	T 21–21	23,562	
November 1	Wyoming	Hughes Stadium; Fort Collins, CO (rivalry)	W 28–25	31,087	
November 8	UTEP	Hughes Stadium; Fort Collins, CO	W 37–7	17,629	
November 15	at No. 13 BYU	Cougar Stadium; Provo, UT	L 14–45	40,515	
*Non-conference game; ^{†}Homecoming; Rankings from AP Poll released prior to the game

== Roster ==
1980 Colorado State Rams football team roster
Players
Coaches
Offense

Pos.	#	Name	Class
RB	2	Jeff Bobrowicz	Sr
OT	71	Kevin Call	Fr
TE	85	Mike Camp	Jr
QB	12	Steve Driscoll	Jr
QB	3	Steve Fairchild	Sr
RB	39	Mike Hendricks	Jr
G	56	Ed Lawson	So
RB	22	Alvin Lewis	Sr
QB	4	Terry Nugent	Fr
OT	67	Joe Porter	So
OT	68	Ed Rhoades	So

Defense

Pos.	#	Name	Class
DT	60	Bob Andrus	So
LB	88	Dan Ane	Jr
DT	70	Mike Blomenkamp	Fr
DT	91	Mike Call	So
LB	58	Orbry Chamblee	Sr
LB	42	Scott Clough	So
LB	44	Dave Jurk	Sr
LB	59	Randy Law	Jr
DB	41	Steve Mog	So
DB	47	Greg Tillman	Jr

Special teams

Pos.	#	Name	Class
K	1	Jon Poole	Fr
P	33	Tom Templer	Jr

Head coach

- Sark Arslanian

Coordinators/assistant coaches

Legend

- (C) Team captain
- (S) Suspended
- (I) Ineligible
- Injured
- Redshirt

== Team players in the NFL ==
Player	Position	Round	Pick	NFL club
Alvin Lewis	Running back	6	151	Denver Broncos
Larry Jones	Running back	10	270	Houston Oilers
