= 1986 Colorado State Rams football team =

College football season

1986 Colorado State Rams football
- Conference: Western Athletic Conference
- Record: 6–5 (4–4 WAC)
- Head coach: Leon Fuller (5th season)
- Offensive coordinator: Dave Lay (2nd season)
- Defensive coordinator: Phil Bounds (1st season)
- Home stadium: Hughes Stadium

1986 Western Athletic Conference football standings
	Conf.					Overall
Team	W		L		T	W		L		T
San Diego State $	7	–	1	–	0	8	–	4	–	0
BYU	6	–	2	–	0	8	–	5	–	0
Air Force	5	–	2	–	0	6	–	5	–	0
Hawaii	4	–	4	–	0	7	–	5	–	0
Colorado State	4	–	4	–	0	6	–	5	–	0
Wyoming	4	–	4	–	0	6	–	6	–	0
New Mexico	2	–	5	–	0	4	–	8	–	0
UTEP	2	–	6	–	0	4	–	8	–	0
Utah	1	–	7	–	0	2	–	9	–	0
$ – Conference champion

The 1986 Colorado State Rams football team represented Colorado State University as a member of the Western Athletic Conference (WAC) during the 1986 NCAA Division I-A football season. Int their fifth season under head coach Leon Fuller, the Rams compiled an overall record of 6–5 with a mark of 4–4 in conference play, placing in a three-way tie for fourth in the WAC. Colorado State played home games at Hughes Stadium in Fort Collins, Colorado.

Colorado State's senior quarterback, Kelly Stouffer, passed for 2,604 yards and 7 touchdowns. Other statistical leaders included Steve Bartalo with 1,419 rushing yards and J. D. Brookhart with 581 receiving yards.

== Schedule ==
Date	Opponent	Site	Result	Attendance	Source
September 6	at Colorado*	Folsom Field; Boulder, CO	W 23–7	45,109	
September 13	at Arizona*	Arizona Stadium; Tucson, AZ	L 10–37	49,003	
September 20	Northern Colorado*	Hughes Stadium; Fort Collins, CO	W 46–14	26,107	
September 27	at Air Force	Falcon Stadium; Colorado Springs, CO	L 7–24	41,213	
October 3	at BYU	Cougar Stadium; Provo, UT	W 24–20	64,633	
October 18	Hawaii	Hughes Stadium; Fort Collins, CO	W 31–7	28,310	
October 25	Wyoming	Hughes Stadium; Fort Collins, CO	W 20–15	31,856	
November 1	San Diego State	Hughes Stadium; Fort Collins, CO	L 26–27	14,127	
November 8	at Utah	Robert Rice Stadium; Salt Lake City, UT	L 28–38	22,650	
November 15	New Mexico	Hughes Stadium; Fort Collins, CO	W 32–7	13,107	
November 22	at UTEP	Sun Bowl; El Paso, TX	L 19–21	12,467	
*Non-conference game

== Roster ==
1986 Colorado State Rams football team roster
Players
Coaches
Offense

Pos.	#	Name	Class
QB	12	Kelly Stouffer	Sr
RB	41	Steve Bartalo	Sr
WR	80	Sanjay Beach	Jr

Defense

Pos.	#	Name	Class

Special teams

Pos.	#	Name	Class
K	1	Steve DeLine	Sr

Head coach

- Leon Fuller

Coordinators/assistant coaches

Legend

- (C) Team captain
- (S) Suspended
- (I) Ineligible
- Injured
- Redshirt

== Team players in the NFL ==
Player	Position	Round	Pick	NFL club
Kelly Stouffer	Quarterback	1	6	St. Louis Cardinals
Steve Bartalo	Running back	6	143	Tampa Bay Buccaneers
Steve DeLine	Kicker	7	189	San Francisco 49ers
