= 1980 Air Force Falcons football team =

American college football season

1980 Air Force Falcons football
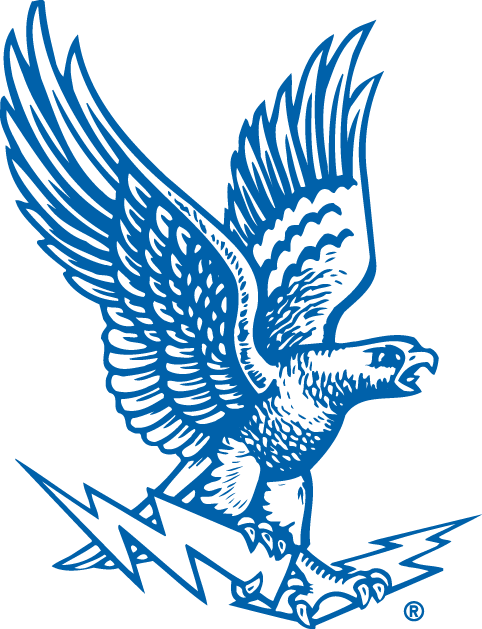
- Conference: Western Athletic Conference
- Record: 2–9–1 (1–3 WAC)
- Head coach: Ken Hatfield (2nd season)
- Offensive scheme: Wishbone triple option
- Defensive coordinator: Fred Goldsmith (1st season)
- Base defense: 3–4
- Captains: Mike Bloomfield; Scott Schafer
- Home stadium: Falcon Stadium

1980 Western Athletic Conference football standings
	Conf.					Overall
Team	W		L		T	W		L		T
No. 12 BYU $	6	–	1	–	0	12	–	1	–	0
Colorado State	5	–	1	–	1	6	–	4	–	1
Hawaii	3	–	3	–	0	8	–	3	–	0
Wyoming	4	–	4	–	0	6	–	5	–	0
San Diego State	4	–	4	–	0	4	–	8	–	0
New Mexico	3	–	4	–	0	4	–	7	–	0
Utah	2	–	3	–	1	5	–	5	–	1
Air Force	1	–	3	–	0	2	–	9	–	1
UTEP	1	–	6	–	0	1	–	11	–	0
$ – Conference champion; Rankings from AP Poll

The 1980 Air Force Falcons football team represented the United States Air Force Academy in the 1981 NCAA Division I-A football season, its first as a member of the Western Athletic Conference (WAC). Led by second-year head coach Ken Hatfield, the Falcons compiled an overall record of 2–9–1 record with a record of 1–3 in conference play, placing eighth in the WAC. Air Force played home games at Falcon Stadium in Colorado Springs, Colorado.

== Schedule ==
Date	Time	Opponent	Site	Result	Attendance	Source
September 6		at Colorado State	Hughes Stadium; Fort Collins, CO (rivalry)	L 9–21	26,017	
September 13		at No. 19 Washington*	Husky Stadium; Seattle, WA	L 7–50	44,999	
September 20		San Diego State	Falcon Stadium; Colorado Springs, CO	L 10–13	24,594	
September 27		at Illinois*	Memorial Stadium; Champaign, IL	T 20–20	45,638	
October 4		at Yale*	Yale Bowl; New Haven, CT	L 16–17	23,000	
October 11		Navy*	Falcon Stadium; Colorado Springs, CO (Commander-in-Chief's Trophy)	W 21–20	27,754	
October 18		at Tulane*	Louisiana Superdome; New Orleans, LA	L 7–28	28,101	
November 1		Boston College*	Falcon Stadium; Colorado Springs, CO	L 0–23	16,018	
November 8		at Army*	Michie Stadium; West Point, NY (Commander-in-Chief's Trophy)	L 24–47	37,653	
November 15		Wyoming	Falcon Stadium; Colorado Springs, CO	W 25–7	15,693	
November 22	11:30 a.m.	at No. 2 Notre Dame*	Notre Dame Stadium; Notre Dame, IN (rivalry)	L 10–24	59,075	
November 29		at Hawaii	Aloha Stadium; Halawa, HI (rivalry)	L 12–20	46,203	
*Non-conference game; Rankings from AP Poll released prior to the game; All times are in Mountain time

== Roster ==
1980 Air Force Falcons football team roster
Players
Coaches
Offense

Pos.	#	Name	Class
G	66	Mike Flynn	Jr
QB	12	Jim Miller	Fr
G	79	Dave Schrek	So

Defense

Pos.	#	Name	Class
S	17	Johnny Jackson	Jr

Special teams

Pos.	#	Name	Class

Head coach

- Ken Hatfield

Coordinators/assistant coaches

Legend

- (C) Team captain
- (S) Suspended
- (I) Ineligible
- Injured
- Redshirt
