= 1980 UNLV Rebels football team =

American college football season

1980 UNLV Rebels football
- Conference: Independent
- Record: 7–4
- Head coach: Tony Knap (5th season)
- Home stadium: Las Vegas Silver Bowl

1980 NCAA Division I-A independents football records
	Conf.					Overall
Team	W		L		T	W		L		T
No. 2 Pittsburgh		–		–		11	–	1	–	0
Tennessee State		–		–		9	–	1	–	0
No. 5 Florida State		–		–		10	–	2	–	0
No. 8 Penn State		–		–		10	–	2	–	0
No. 9 Notre Dame		–		–		9	–	2	–	1
No. 18 Miami (FL)		–		–		9	–	3	–	0
Southern Miss		–		–		9	–	3	–	0
Navy		–		–		8	–	4	–	0
South Carolina		–		–		8	–	4	–	0
Virginia Tech		–		–		8	–	4	–	0
Boston College		–		–		7	–	4	–	0
Northeast Louisiana		–		–		7	–	4	–	0
Rutgers		–		–		7	–	4	–	0
UNLV		–		–		7	–	4	–	0
Tulane		–		–		7	–	5	–	0
Colgate		–		–		5	–	4	–	1
North Texas State		–		–		6	–	5	–	0
Villanova		–		–		6	–	5	–	0
West Virginia		–		–		6	–	6	–	0
Louisville		–		–		5	–	6	–	0
Richmond		–		–		5	–	6	–	0
Syracuse		–		–		5	–	6	–	0
East Carolina		–		–		4	–	7	–	0
Illinois State		–		–		4	–	7	–	0
Temple		–		–		4	–	7	–	0
Army		–		–		3	–	7	–	1
Holy Cross		–		–		3	–	8	–	0
Cincinnati		–		–		2	–	9	–	0
Memphis State		–		–		2	–	9	–	0
William & Mary		–		–		2	–	9	–	0
Georgia Tech		–		–		1	–	9	–	1
Rankings from AP Poll

The 1980 UNLV Rebels football team was an American football team that represented the University of Nevada, Las Vegas as an independent during the 1980 NCAA Division I-A football season. In their fifth year under head coach Tony Knap, the team compiled a 7–4 record.

== Schedule ==
Date	Opponent	Site	Result	Attendance	Source
September 13	Fresno State	Las Vegas Silver Bowl; Whitney, NV	W 35–6	19,085	
September 20	at Utah	Robert Rice Stadium; Salt Lake City, UT	L 29–45	23,645	
September 27	at Colorado State	Hughes Stadium; Fort Collins, CO	W 56–15	25,972	
October 4	Cal State Fullerton	Las Vegas Silver Bowl; Whitney, NV	W 36–17	21,974	
October 11	at San Diego State	San Diego Stadium; San Diego, CA	W 28–17	28,212	
October 18	UTEP	Las Vegas Silver Bowl; Whitney, NV	W 53–14	20,552	
October 25	at Oregon	Autzen Stadium; Eugene, OR	L 9–32	31,651	
November 1	at New Mexico	University Stadium; Albuquerque, NM	W 72–7	14,250	
November 8	Wyoming	Las Vegas Silver Bowl; Whitney, NV	W 33–26	20,277	
November 15	Hawaii	Las Vegas Silver Bowl; Whitney, NV	L 19–24	27,239	
November 29	No. 12 BYU	Las Vegas Silver Bowl; Whitney, NV	L 14–54	31,406	
Rankings from Coaches' Poll released prior to the game
