= Rodney Ferguson =

American football player (born 1986)

No. 44
- Position: Running back

Personal information
- Born: August 25, 1986 (age 40); Flint, Michigan
- Listed height: 6 ft 0 in (1.83 m)
- Listed weight: 234 lb (106 kg)

Career information
- High school: Albuquerque (NM) Manzano
- College: New Mexico
- NFL draft: 2009: undrafted

Career history
- Tennessee Titans (2009)*; Buffalo Bills (2010)*
- * Offseason or practice squad member only

Awards and highlights
- First-team All-MW (2006)
- Stats at Pro Football Reference

Rodney Laurence Ferguson II (born August 25, 1986) is an American former football running back. He was signed by the Tennessee Titans as an undrafted free agent in 2009. He played college football at New Mexico.

== College career ==
Ferguson graduated from Manzano High School in Albuquerque in 2004 and enrolled at the University of New Mexico that year. Playing as a backup to DonTrell Moore, Ferguson gained 48 yards on 11 carries in his first season with the Lobos. The following season, Ferguson ran for a career-high 1,234 yards with 7 touchdowns en route to a first team all Mountain West Conference selection. In his third season at UNM, Ferguson ran for 1,177 yards and 13 touchdowns, which again led to his selection to the first team all-MWC team. 2008 was his 4th and final year at New Mexico. During the season Ferguson rushed for 1,105 yards and 13 touchdowns, but the Lobos finished with a 4–8 record in which they lost 5 of the final 6 games and did not make a bowl game. He was also a team captain in 2008.

== Professional career ==
=== Tennessee Titans ===
After going undrafted in the 2009 NFL draft, Ferguson was signed by the Tennessee Titans on April 26, 2009. He was waived during final roster cuts on September 4, 2009, and signed to the team's practice squad two days later. He was released on September 29, 2009.

=== Buffalo Bills ===
Ferguson was signed by the Buffalo Bills on April 12, 2010. He was waived during final roster cuts on September 4, 2010, and signed to the team's practice squad the next day. He was released on November 9, 2010.
