= 1980 San Diego State Aztecs football team =

American college football season

1980 San Diego State Aztecs football
- Conference: Western Athletic Conference
- Record: 4–8 (4–4 WAC)
- Head coach: Claude Gilbert (8th season)
- Offensive coordinator: Ted Tollner (8th season)
- Offensive scheme: Pro-style
- Base defense: 4–3
- Home stadium: San Diego Stadium

1980 Western Athletic Conference football standings
	Conf.					Overall
Team	W		L		T	W		L		T
No. 12 BYU $	6	–	1	–	0	12	–	1	–	0
Colorado State	5	–	1	–	1	6	–	4	–	1
Hawaii	3	–	3	–	0	8	–	3	–	0
Wyoming	4	–	4	–	0	6	–	5	–	0
San Diego State	4	–	4	–	0	4	–	8	–	0
New Mexico	3	–	4	–	0	4	–	7	–	0
Utah	2	–	3	–	1	5	–	5	–	1
Air Force	1	–	3	–	0	2	–	9	–	1
UTEP	1	–	6	–	0	1	–	11	–	0
$ – Conference champion; Rankings from AP Poll

The 1980 San Diego State Aztecs football team represented San Diego State University during the 1980 NCAA Division I-A football season as a member of the Western Athletic Conference (WAC).

The team was led by head coach Claude Gilbert, in his eight and final year, and played home games at San Diego Stadium (Note: San Diego County Credit Union Stadium (SDCCU Stadium) was known as San Diego Stadium from its opening in 1967 through 1980.) in San Diego, California. They finished with a record of four wins and eight losses (4–8, 4–4 WAC).

== Schedule ==
Date	Opponent	Site	TV	Result	Attendance	Source
September 13	at BYU	Cougar Stadium; Provo, UT	ABC	L 11–35	36,178	
September 20	at Air Force	Falcon Stadium; Colorado Springs, CO		W 13–10	24,594	
September 27	No. 12 Missouri*	San Diego Stadium; San Diego, CA		L 7–31	28,140	
October 4	at Wisconsin*	Camp Randall Stadium; Madison, WI		L 12–35	76,430	
October 11	UNLV*	San Diego Stadium; San Diego, CA		L 17–28	28,212	
October 18	Colorado State	San Diego Stadium; San Diego, CA		L 7–26	28,050	
October 25	at Wyoming	War Memorial Stadium; Laramie, WY		L 9–34	15,325	
November 1	Oklahoma State*^{†}	San Diego Stadium; San Diego, CA		L 6–15	24,716	
November 8	at Hawaii	Aloha Stadium; Halawa, HI		L 6–31	36,485	
November 15	at UTEP	Sun Bowl; El Paso, TX		W 28–7	1,407	
November 22	New Mexico	San Diego Stadium; San Diego, CA		W 24–22	21,900	
November 29	Utah	San Diego Stadium; San Diego, CA		W 21–20	18,030	
*Non-conference game; ^{†}Homecoming; Rankings from AP Poll released prior to the game

== Team players in the NFL ==
The following were selected in the 1981 NFL draft.

Player	Position	Round	Overall	NFL team
Reuben Henderson	Defensive back	6	150	Chicago Bears
Jim Wilks	Defensive end – Nose tackle	12	305	New Orleans Saints

The following finished their college career in 1980, were not drafted, but played in the NFL.

Player	Position	First NFL team
Craig Ellis	Running back	1986 Miami Dolphins
Ron Spears	Defensive end	1982 New England Patriots

== Team awards ==
Award	Player
Most Valuable Player (John Simcox Memorial Trophy)	Kevin Mitchell
Outstanding Offensive & Defensive Linemen (Byron H. Chase Memorial Trophy)	Ulima Afoa, Off; Jim Wilks, Def
Team captains Dr. R. Hardy / C.E. Peterson Memorial Trophy	Ulima Afoa, Off; Rick Carusa, Def
Most Inspirational Player	Kevin Mitchell
