= 1980 Hawaii Rainbow Warriors football team =

American college football season

1980 Hawaii Rainbow Warriors football
- Conference: Western Athletic Conference
- Record: 8–3 (3–3 WAC)
- Head coach: Dick Tomey (4th season)
- Home stadium: Aloha Stadium

1980 Western Athletic Conference football standings
	Conf.					Overall
Team	W		L		T	W		L		T
No. 12 BYU $	6	–	1	–	0	12	–	1	–	0
Colorado State	5	–	1	–	1	6	–	4	–	1
Hawaii	3	–	3	–	0	8	–	3	–	0
Wyoming	4	–	4	–	0	6	–	5	–	0
San Diego State	4	–	4	–	0	4	–	8	–	0
New Mexico	3	–	4	–	0	4	–	7	–	0
Utah	2	–	3	–	1	5	–	5	–	1
Air Force	1	–	3	–	0	2	–	9	–	1
UTEP	1	–	6	–	0	1	–	11	–	0
$ – Conference champion; Rankings from AP Poll

The 1980 Hawaii Rainbow Warriors football team was an American football team that represented the University of Hawaii in the Western Athletic Conference (WAC) during the 1980 NCAA Division I-A football season. In their fourth season under head coach Dick Tomey, the Rainbow Warriors compiled an 8–3 record (3–3 against WAC opponents), placed third in the WAC, and outscored opponents by a total of 260 to 212.

The team's statistical leaders included Mike Stennis with 869 passing yards, Gary Allen with 864 rushing yards, Ron Pennick with 282 receiving yards, and Jim Asmus with 68 point scored (13 field goals and 29 extra points).

== Schedule ==
Date	Opponent	Site	Result	Attendance	Source
September 13	Abilene Christian*	Aloha Stadium; Halawa, HI	W 41–0	46,649	
September 20	Pacific (CA)*	Aloha Stadium; Halawa, HI	W 25–14	43,900	
September 27	at Wyoming	War Memorial Stadium; Laramie, WY (rivalry)	L 20–45	20,883	
October 4	UTEP	Aloha Stadium; Halawa, HI	L 14–34	40,421	
October 11	West Virginia*^{†}	Aloha Stadium; Halawa, HI	W 16–13	41,889	
October 18	at New Mexico	University Stadium; Albuquerque, NM	W 31–14	15,813	
October 25	No. 19 BYU	Aloha Stadium; Halawa, HI	L 7–34	49,139	
November 1	Cal State Fullerton*	Aloha Stadium; Halawa, HI	W 31–21	38,166	
November 8	San Diego State	Aloha Stadium; Halawa, HI	W 31–6	36,485	
November 15	at UNLV*	Las Vegas Silver Bowl; Whitney, NV	W 24–19	27,239	
November 29	Air Force	Aloha Stadium; Halawa, HI (rivalry)	W 20–12	46,203	
*Non-conference game; ^{†}Homecoming; Rankings from Coaches' Poll released prior to the game
