= 1980 Utah Utes football team =

American college football season

1980 Utah Utes football
- Conference: Western Athletic Conference
- Record: 5–5–1 (2–3–1 WAC)
- Head coach: Wayne Howard (4th season)
- Offensive coordinator: Ron McBride (4th season)
- Defensive coordinator: Tom Gadd (4th season)
- Home stadium: Robert Rice Stadium

1980 Western Athletic Conference football standings
	Conf.					Overall
Team	W		L		T	W		L		T
No. 12 BYU $	6	–	1	–	0	12	–	1	–	0
Colorado State	5	–	1	–	1	6	–	4	–	1
Hawaii	3	–	3	–	0	8	–	3	–	0
Wyoming	4	–	4	–	0	6	–	5	–	0
San Diego State	4	–	4	–	0	4	–	8	–	0
New Mexico	3	–	4	–	0	4	–	7	–	0
Utah	2	–	3	–	1	5	–	5	–	1
Air Force	1	–	3	–	0	2	–	9	–	1
UTEP	1	–	6	–	0	1	–	11	–	0
$ – Conference champion; Rankings from AP Poll

The 1980 Utah Utes football team was an American football team that represented the University of Utah as a member of the Western Athletic Conference (WAC) during the 1980 NCAA Division I-A football season. In their fourth season under head coach Wayne Howard, the Utes compiled an overall record of 5–5–1 with a mark of 2–3–1 against conference opponents, placing seventh in the WAC. Home games were played on campus at Robert Rice Stadium in Salt Lake City.

== Schedule ==
Date	Time	Opponent	Site	Result	Attendance	Source
September 6	7:30 pm	Boise State*	Robert Rice Stadium; Salt Lake City, UT	L 7–28	27,231	
September 13	12:30 pm	at No. 8 Nebraska*	Memorial Stadium; Lincoln, NE	L 9–55	75,526	
September 20	7:30 pm	UNLV*	Robert Rice Stadium; Salt Lake City, UT	W 45–29	23,645	
September 27	7:30 pm	Fresno State	Robert Rice Stadium; Salt Lake City, UT	W 27–12	25,645	
October 4	1:30 pm	at Utah State*	Romney Stadium; Logan, UT (Battle of the Brothers)	W 23–19	20,166	
October 11	7:30 pm	at UTEP	Sun Bowl; El Paso, TX	W 31–7	19,700	
October 18	1:30 pm	at Wyoming	War Memorial Stadium; Laramie, WY	L 21–24	5,515	
October 25	1:30 pm	Colorado State^{†}	Robert Rice Stadium; Salt Lake City, UT	T 21–21	23,562	
November 8	1:30 pm	New Mexico	Robert Rice Stadium; Salt Lake City, UT	W 49–21	21,248	
November 22	1:30 pm	No. 13 BYU	Rice Stadium; Salt Lake City, UT (Holy War)	L 6–56	30,520	
November 29	8:30 pm	at San Diego State	San Diego Stadium; San Diego, CA	L 20–21	18,050	
*Non-conference game; ^{†}Homecoming; Rankings from AP Poll released prior to the game; All times are in Mountain time

== Game summaries ==
=== BYU ===
#13 BYU Cougars (9–1) at Utah Utes (6–2–1)

Quarter	1	2	3	4	Total
BYU	7	14	21	14	56
Utah	0	0	0	6	6

at Rice Stadium, Salt Lake City, Utah

- Date: November 22, 1980
- Game weather: Light rain, 42 °F (6 °C)
- Game attendance: 30,520
- Box Score

Game information

First quarter

- BYU – Eric Lane 1-yard run (Kurt Gunther kick). BYU 7–0.

Second quarter

- BYU – Jim McMahon 7-yard run (Kurt Gunther kick). BYU 14–0.
- BYU – Clay Brown 5-yard pass from Jim McMahon (Kurt Gunther kick), 1:47. BYU 21–0.

Third quarter

- BYU – Eric Lane 11-yard pass from Jim McMahon (Kurt Gunther kick). BYU 28–0.
- BYU – Eric Lane 1-yard run (Kurt Gunther kick). BYU 35–0.
- BYU – Clay Brown 76-yard pass from Jim McMahon (Kurt Gunther kick). BYU 42–0.

Fourth quarter

- UTAH – Hilria Johnson 1-yard run (pass failed). BYU 42–6.
- BYU – Steve Carlsen 1-yard run (Kurt Gunther kick). BYU 49–6.
- BYU – Scott Pettis 5-yard run (Kurt Gunther kick). BYU 56–6.

Top passers

- BYU – Jim McMahon – 21/34, 399 yards, 3 TD, INT
- UTAH – Ricky Hardin – 19/31, 258 yards, 2 INT

Top rushers

- BYU – Scott Pettis – 4 rushes, 81 yards, TD
- UTAH – Tony Lindsay – 22 rushes, 93 yards

Top receivers

- BYU – Clay Brown – 5 receptions, 184 yards, 2 TD
- UTAH – James Teahan – 7 receptions, 92 yards

External videos
- 1980 BYU at Utah – Highlights

== Roster ==
1980 Utah Utes football team roster
Players
Coaches
Offense

Pos.	#	Name	Class
OT	76	Jack Campbell	Jr
OT	72	Tim Davis	Sr
TE	95	Dan Doubiago	Jr
QB	11	Tyce Ferguson	Jr
TE	82	Steve Folsom	Sr
G	68	Darryl Haley	Jr
QB	6	Ricky Hardin	Sr
WR	12	Floyd Hodge	Sr
RB	22	Tony Lindsay	Sr
G	64	Dean Miraldi	Sr
RB	33	Del Rodgers	Jr

Defense

Pos.	#	Name	Class
DT	77	Bob Alvey	Sr
LB	89	Mark Anderson	Sr
DT	99	Steve Clark	Jr
S	8	Scott Daniels	Jr
LB	30	Greg Day	Jr
DB	1	Jeff Griffin	Sr
DB	15	Terry Hess	Sr
DL	38	Jack Kerr	Jr
LB	14	Mike Kunz	So

Special teams

Pos.	#	Name	Class
K	13	Gilbert Alvarez	So

Head coach

- Wayne Howard

Coordinators/assistant coaches

Legend

- (C) Team captain
- (S) Suspended
- (I) Ineligible
- Injured
- Redshirt

== NFL draft ==
Three Utes were selected in the 1981 NFL draft.

Player	Position	Round	Pick	NFL team
Dean Miraldi	Guard	2	55	Philadelphia Eagles
Jeff Griffin	Defensive back	3	61	St. Louis Cardinals
Steve Folsom	Tight end	10	261	Miami Dolphins
