= 1986 UTEP Miners football team =

American college football season

1986 UTEP Miners football
- Conference: Western Athletic Conference
- Record: 4–8 (2–6 WAC)
- Head coach: Bob Stull (1st season)
- Offensive coordinator: Dirk Koetter (1st season)
- Co-offensive coordinator: Jim Marshall (1st season)
- Home stadium: Sun Bowl

1986 Western Athletic Conference football standings
	Conf.					Overall
Team	W		L		T	W		L		T
San Diego State $	7	–	1	–	0	8	–	4	–	0
BYU	6	–	2	–	0	8	–	5	–	0
Air Force	5	–	2	–	0	6	–	5	–	0
Hawaii	4	–	4	–	0	7	–	5	–	0
Colorado State	4	–	4	–	0	6	–	5	–	0
Wyoming	4	–	4	–	0	6	–	6	–	0
New Mexico	2	–	5	–	0	4	–	8	–	0
UTEP	2	–	6	–	0	4	–	8	–	0
Utah	1	–	7	–	0	2	–	9	–	0
$ – Conference champion

The 1986 UTEP Miners football team was an American football team that represented the University of Texas at El Paso in the Western Athletic Conference during the 1986 NCAA Division I-A football season. In their first year under head coach Bob Stull, the team compiled a 4–8 record.

== Schedule ==
Date	Opponent	Site	Result	Attendance	Source
August 30	Northern Michigan*	Sun Bowl; El Paso, TX	W 64–29	26,510	
September 6	Air Force	Sun Bowl; El Paso, TX	L 21–23	42,385	
September 13	at New Mexico State*	Aggie Memorial Stadium; Las Cruces, NM (rivalry)	W 47–33	32,904	
September 20	at Hawaii	Aloha Stadium; Halawa, HI	L 21–31	46,427	
September 27	at No. 15 Iowa*	Kinnick Stadium; Iowa City, IA	L 7–69	67,500	
October 4	at Tennessee*	Neyland Stadium; Knoxville, TN	L 16–26	92,824	
October 11	at New Mexico	University Stadium; Albuquerque, NM	L 22–24	18,170	
October 18	San Diego State^{†}	Sun Bowl; El Paso, TX	L 10–15	40,109	
October 25	at BYU	Cougar Stadium; Provo, UT	L 13–37	64,617	
November 8	at Wyoming	War Memorial Stadium; Laramie, WY	L 12–41	7,250	
November 22	Colorado State	Sun Bowl; El Paso, TX	W 21–19	12,467	
November 29	Utah	Sun Bowl; El Paso, TX	W 55–44	14,567	
*Non-conference game; ^{†}Homecoming; Rankings from AP Poll released prior to the game

== Records ==
Quarterback Sammy Garza broke the school record for single game passing completions and passing touchdowns against Northern Michigan when he went completed 36 passes on 49 attempts for 458 yards, 7 TDs and 1 INT. His 7 TDs in a single game record still stands.
