= Carmen Messina =

American football player (born 1988)

Profile
- Position: Linebacker

Personal information
- Born: September 8, 1988 (age 38)
- Listed height: 6 ft 2 in (1.88 m)
- Listed weight: 236 lb (107 kg)

Career information
- High school: Addison Trail (Addison, Illinois)
- College: New Mexico (2007–2011)
- NFL draft: 2012: undrafted

Career history
- Detroit Lions (2012)*
- * Offseason or practice squad member only

Awards and highlights
- FBS tackles leader (2009); 2× First-team All-Mountain West (2009, 2011); Second-team All-Mountain West (2010)
- Stats at Pro Football Reference

Carmen Messina (born September 8, 1988) is an American former football linebacker. He played college football for the New Mexico Lobos and led the Football Bowl Subdivision in tackles in 2009. He was on the Detroit Lions' practice squad in 2012.

== Early life ==
Carmen Messina was born on September 8, 1988. He played high school football at Addison Trail High School in Addison, Illinois.

== College career ==
Messina enrolled at the University of New Mexico to play college football for the Lobos. He redshirted the 2007 season and was a four-year letterman from 2008 to 2011. He played in all 48 games for the Lobos from 2008 to 2011, and was a three-year starter from 2009 to 2011. Messina led the Football Bowl Subdivision in tackles in 2009 with 162. He was named first-team All-Mountain West Conference in 2009 and 2011 and second-team All-Mountain West in 2010. Messina finished his college career with 217 solo tackles, 237 assisted tackles, nine sacks, two interceptions, seven forced fumbles, and five pass breakups. The Lobos were only 3–33 in his three seasons as a full-time starter.

== Professional career ==
After going undrafted in the 2012 NFL draft, Messina signed with the Detroit Lions on May 10, 2012. During the 2012 preseason, he recorded nine solo tackles, five assisted tackles, and one interception for eight yards. He was released on August 31 but signed to the practice squad the next day.

Messina signed a futures contract with the Lions on December 31, 2012. He played in one game during the 2013 preseason, posting two solo tackles. He was waived/injured on August 12, 2013, with a hamstring injury and reverted to injured reserve the next day. Messina was waived from injured reserve on August 16, 2013.

== See also ==
- List of NCAA major college football yearly tackles leaders
- New Mexico Lobos football statistical leaders
