= 1985 Colorado State Rams football team =

American college football season

1985 Colorado State Rams football
- Conference: Western Athletic Conference
- Record: 5–7 (4–4 WAC)
- Head coach: Leon Fuller (4th season)
- Offensive coordinator: Dave Lay (1st season)
- Defensive coordinator: Gary Sloan (4th season)
- Home stadium: Hughes Stadium

1985 Western Athletic Conference football standings
	Conf.					Overall
Team	W		L		T	W		L		T
No. 8 Air Force +	7	–	1	–	0	12	–	1	–	0
No. 16 BYU +	7	–	1	–	0	11	–	3	–	0
Utah	5	–	3	–	0	8	–	4	–	0
Hawaii	4	–	3	–	1	4	–	6	–	2
Colorado State	4	–	4	–	0	5	–	7	–	0
San Diego State	3	–	4	–	1	5	–	6	–	1
New Mexico	2	–	6	–	0	3	–	8	–	0
Wyoming	2	–	6	–	0	3	–	8	–	0
UTEP	1	–	7	–	0	1	–	10	–	0
+ – Conference co-champions; Rankings from AP Poll

The 1985 Colorado State Rams football team represented Colorado State University in the Western Athletic Conference during the 1985 NCAA Division I-A football season. In their fourth season under head coach Leon Fuller, the Rams compiled a 5–7 record.

== Schedule ==
Date	Opponent	Site	TV	Result	Attendance	Source
September 7	at Colorado*	Folsom Field; Boulder, CO (rivalry)		L 10–23	40,665	
September 14	UTEP	Hughes Stadium; Fort Collins, CO		W 41–24	22,781	
September 21	at No. 9 LSU*	Tiger Stadium; Baton Rouge, LA	TigerVision	L 3–17	78,491	
September 28	at San Diego State	Jack Murphy Stadium; San Diego, CA		L 23–48	14,755	
October 5	No. 15 BYU	Hughes Stadium; Fort Collins, CO		L 7–42	26,881	
October 12	at New Mexico	University Stadium; Albuquerque, NM		W 45–28	18,713	
October 19	No. 10 Air Force	Hughes Stadium; Fort Collins, CO (rivalry)		L 19–35	31,127	
October 26	at Wyoming	War Memorial Stadium; Laramie, WY (rivalry)		W 30–19	13,702	
November 2	at Hawaii	Aloha Stadium; Halawa, HI		L 14–34	43,451	
November 9	Southern Miss*	Hughes Stadium; Fort Collins, CO		W 35–17	3,812	
November 16	Utah	Hughes Stadium; Fort Collins, CO		W 21–19	8,511	
November 23	at No. 4 Miami (FL)*	Miami Orange Bowl; Miami, FL		L 3–24	35,035	
*Non-conference game; Rankings from AP Poll released prior to the game
