= Leon Fuller =

American football player and coach (1938–2026)

Biographical details
- Born: July 28, 1938; Nederland, Texas, U.S.
- Died: July 11, 2026 (aged 87); Austin, Texas, U.S.

Playing career
- 1956–1958: Tyler
- 1959–1960: Alabama
- Positions: Halfback, defensive back

Coaching career (HC unless noted)
- 1966–1968: Kentucky (DB)
- 1974: West Texas State (DC)
- 1975–1976: Wyoming (DC)
- 1977–1981: Texas (DC)
- 1982–1988: Colorado State
- 1989–1993: Texas (DC)
- 1994: Denver Broncos (DB)
- 1995: Llano HS (TX)

Head coaching record
- Overall: 25–55 (college)

Robert Leon Fuller (July 28, 1938 – July 11, 2026) was an American football coach. He served as head coach of the Colorado State college football program from 1982 to 1988. Fuller also served as defensive coordinator for the Texas Longhorns and is regarded as “one of the best defensive coaches the University of Texas ever had.”

== Playing career ==
Fuller grew up in Nederland, Texas, where he attended high school and played football for Bum Phillips. Despite only weighing 135 pounds (61 kg), Fuller displayed extraordinary talent and tenaciousness as a defensive back. As a senior in high school, Fuller lived with the Phillips family, after his father was shot in a bar and his mother left town.

Because of his size, Fuller was not recruited by any college, but Phillips recommended him to Floyd Wagstaff, head coach at Tyler Junior College. Fuller was awarded a scholarship and immediately became the team's most valuable player. He was named All-Texas Junior College and NJCAA All-American.

Bum Phillips later recommended Fuller again to an acquainted colleague, this time Alabama Crimson Tide coach Bear Bryant. In his first year, Fuller made the All-Southeast Conference team at safety, and during his senior year he made the all-star team on both offense and defense and served as team captain. He played in the North/South All-Star Game and the Senior Bowl All-Star at Alabama.

== Coaching career ==
My goal going through that was to be a football coach because it looked like (Phillips) was having so much fun doing it.

— Leon Fuller

After graduating from Alabama in 1961, Fuller became an assistant coach at Big Spring High School. In 1963, he was hired as graduate assistant at Oklahoma State University–Stillwater. Fuller continued his coaching career with stints at the University of Kentucky and the University of New Mexico. In 1974, he was appointed defensive coordinator at West Texas State University by Gene Mayfield. A year later he left to take over a similar position at the University of Wyoming under Fred Akers. In 1977 Fuller followed Akers to the University of Texas at Austin. Fuller instantly became a favorite among Texas fans and alumni, as his defensive units frequently ranked among the nation's best.

In 1982, Fuller got his first head coaching job, replacing interim coach Chester Caddas at Colorado State University. He went 25–55 through seven seasons and was dismissed after the Rams finished the 1988 season at 1–10. Fuller then returned to Texas, replacing Paul Jette as Longhorns defensive coordinator for head coach David McWilliams. When John Mackovic replaced McWilliams as Longhorns head coach in 1992, Fuller remained in that position as one of the only two coaches to stay and not have been fired. Two seasons later however, Mackovic fired Fuller, citing a difference of philosophy and strained relationship between the two as his reason. Wade Phillips, Bum Phillips' son, immediately hired Fuller as defensive backs coach for the Denver Broncos.

Returning to the high school level after 32 years, Fuller became head football coach and athletic director of the Llano Independent School District, guiding the Yellowjackets to a 9–2 record in 1995. He then retired from coaching and left Llano to take over as athletic director at the Austin Independent School District. Fuller served in that capacity for eight years overseeing that district's 11 high schools and 17 junior highs, before retiring after the 2003-04 school year.

Fuller came out of retirement in 2007 to replace Gary Gaines as athletic director of the Ector County Independent School District, and then hired him as head coach.

== Death ==
Fuller died at his home in Austin, Texas, on July 11, 2026, at the age of 87.

== Head coaching record ==
=== College ===
Year	Team	Overall	Conference	Standing
Colorado State Rams (Western Athletic Conference) (1982–1988)
1982	Colorado State	4–7	3–5	6th
1983	Colorado State	5–7	4–4	T–5th
1984	Colorado State	3–8	3–5	7th
1985	Colorado State	5–7	4–4	5th
1986	Colorado State	6–5	4–4	T–4th
1987	Colorado State	1–11	1–7	8th
1988	Colorado State	1–10	1–7	T–8th
Colorado State:		25–55	20–36	
Total:		25–55		
