= 1986 BYU Cougars football team =

American college football season

1986 BYU Cougars football

Freedom Bowl, L 10–31 vs. UCLA
- Conference: Western Athletic Conference
- Record: 8–5 (6–2 WAC)
- Head coach: LaVell Edwards (15th season)
- Offensive coordinator: Roger French (6th season)
- Offensive scheme: West Coast
- Defensive coordinator: Dick Felt (12th season)
- Base defense: 4–3
- Home stadium: Cougar Stadium

1986 Western Athletic Conference football standings
	Conf.					Overall
Team	W		L		T	W		L		T
San Diego State $	7	–	1	–	0	8	–	4	–	0
BYU	6	–	2	–	0	8	–	5	–	0
Air Force	5	–	2	–	0	6	–	5	–	0
Hawaii	4	–	4	–	0	7	–	5	–	0
Colorado State	4	–	4	–	0	6	–	5	–	0
Wyoming	4	–	4	–	0	6	–	6	–	0
New Mexico	2	–	5	–	0	4	–	8	–	0
UTEP	2	–	6	–	0	4	–	8	–	0
Utah	1	–	7	–	0	2	–	9	–	0
$ – Conference champion

The 1986 BYU Cougars football team represented Brigham Young University as a member of the Western Athletic Conference (WAC) during the 1986 NCAA Division I-A football season. Led by 15th-year head coach LaVell Edwards, the Cougars compiled a record of 8–5 overall and 6–2 in conference play, placing second in the WAC. BYU was invited to the Freedom Bowl, where the Cougars lost to UCLA.

== Schedule ==
Date	Opponent	Rank	Site	TV	Result	Attendance	Source
September 6	Utah State*	No. 18	Cougar Stadium; Provo, UT (Beehive Boot)		W 52–0	64,213	
September 13	New Mexico	No. 11	Cougar Stadium; Provo, UT	KSL	W 31–30	64,385	
September 20	at No. 7 Washington*	No. 11	Husky Stadium; Seattle, WA		L 21–52	61,197	
September 27	Temple*		Cougar Stadium; Provo, UT	KSL	W 27–17	64,221	
October 3	Colorado State		Cougar Stadium; Provo, UT	KSL	L 20–24	64,633	
October 18	at Wyoming		War Memorial Stadium; Laramie, WY		W 34–22	31,742	
October 25	UTEP		Cougar Stadium; Provo, UT		W 37–13	64,617	
November 8	at Hawaii		Aloha Stadium; Halawa, HI		W 10–3	46,485	
November 15	Oregon State*		Cougar Stadium; Provo, UT	KSL	L 7–10	63,321	
November 22	at Utah		Robert Rice Stadium; Salt Lake City, UT (Holy War)	KUTV	W 35–21	34,128	
November 29	at San Diego State		Jack Murphy Stadium; San Diego, CA	ESPN	L 3–10	45,062	
December 6	at Air Force		Falcon Stadium; Colorado Springs, CO		W 23–3	37,004	
December 30	vs. No. 15 UCLA*		Anaheim Stadium; Anaheim, CA (Freedom Bowl)		L 10–31	55,422	
*Non-conference game; Rankings from AP Poll released prior to the game

== Game summaries ==
=== At Washington ===
BYU at Washington

Team	1	2	3	4	Total
Cougars	7	0	0	14	21
• Huskies	15	27	3	7	52

- Date: September 20
- Location: Husky Stadium
- Game attendance: 61,197

=== Utah ===
BYU at Utah

Team	1	2	3	4	Total
• BYU	7	7	14	7	35
Utah	0	7	0	14	21

- Date: November 22
- Location: Robert Rice Stadium, Salt Lake City, Utah
- Elapsed time: 3:20
- Game attendance: 34,128
- Game weather: Partly cloudy/snow flurries, 42 F

Scoring summary
1	BYU	Parker 41-yard run (Chitty kick)	BYU 7-0
2	BYU	Heimuli 2-yard run (Chitty kick)	BYU 14-0
2	UTAH	Holder 44-yard pass from Egger (Lieber kick)	BYU 14-7
3	BYU	Heimuli 20-yard run (Chitty kick)	BYU 21-7
3	BYU	Hansen 2-yard run (Chitty kick)	BYU 28-7
4	BYU	Parker 17-yard run (Chitty kick)	BYU 35-7
4	UTAH	Hardy 35-yard pass from Egger (Richey pass from Egger)	BYU 35-15
4	UTAH	Jenkins 46-yard pass from Egger (pass failed)	BYU 35-21

=== Air Force ===
Team	1	2	3	4	Total
Air Force	3	0	0	0	3
• BYU	3	20	0	0	23

- Date: December 6
- Location: Cougar Stadium

Scoring summary
Q1	AF	Blasy 19 yard field goal	AF 3–0
Q1	BYU	Chitty 43 yard field goal	Tie 3–3
Q2	BYU	Chitty 39 yard field goal	BYU 6–3
Q2	BYU	Heimuli 1 yard run (Chitty kick)	BYU 13–3
Q2	BYU	Heimuli 18 yard pass from Jensen (Chitty kick)	BYU 20–3
Q2	BYU	Chitty 31 yard field goal	BYU 23–3

=== Vs. UCLA (Freedom Bowl) ===
BYU vs. UCLA

Team	1	2	3	4	Total
Cougars	3	0	0	7	10
• Bruins	7	0	17	7	31

- Date: December 30
- Location: Anaheim Stadium
- Game attendance: 51,422
- TV announcers: Howard David and Jack Snow

== Roster ==
1986 BYU Cougars football team roster
Players
Coaches
Offense

Pos.	#	Name	Class
WR	11	Mark Bellini	Sr
WR	18	Jim Edwards	Sr
RB	2	Bruce Hansen	Sr
G	78	Warren Wheat	So
QB	12	Mike Young	Jr

Defense

Pos.	#	Name	Class
DE	99	Jason Buck	Sr
DT	77	Shawn Knight	Sr
DT	51	Craig Patterson	Fr

Special teams

Pos.	#	Name	Class

Head coach

- LaVell Edwards

Coordinators/assistant coaches

Legend

- (C) Team captain
- (S) Suspended
- (I) Ineligible
- Injured
- Redshirt

Roster
