= 1985 New Mexico Lobos football team =

American college football season

1985 New Mexico Lobos football
- Conference: Western Athletic Conference
- Record: 3–8 (2–6 WAC)
- Head coach: Joe Lee Dunn (3rd season)
- Home stadium: University Stadium

1985 Western Athletic Conference football standings
	Conf.					Overall
Team	W		L		T	W		L		T
No. 8 Air Force +	7	–	1	–	0	12	–	1	–	0
No. 16 BYU +	7	–	1	–	0	11	–	3	–	0
Utah	5	–	3	–	0	8	–	4	–	0
Hawaii	4	–	3	–	1	4	–	6	–	2
Colorado State	4	–	4	–	0	5	–	7	–	0
San Diego State	3	–	4	–	1	5	–	6	–	1
New Mexico	2	–	6	–	0	3	–	8	–	0
Wyoming	2	–	6	–	0	3	–	8	–	0
UTEP	1	–	7	–	0	1	–	10	–	0
+ – Conference co-champions; Rankings from AP Poll

The 1985 New Mexico Lobos football team was an American football team that represented the University of New Mexico in the Western Athletic Conference (WAC) during the 1985 NCAA Division I-A football season. In their third season under head coach Joe Lee Dunn, the Lobos compiled a 3–8 record (2–6 against WAC opponents) and were outscored by a total of 415 to 289.

The team's statistical leaders included Billy Rucker with 2,475 passing yards, Willie Turral with 800 rushing yards and 84 points scored, and Terance Mathis with 852 receiving yards.

== Schedule ==
Date	Opponent	Site	Result	Attendance	Source
September 7	at Texas Tech*	Jones Stadium; Lubbock, TX	L 31–32	35,118	
September 14	at New Mexico State*	Aggie Memorial Stadium; Las Cruces, NM (rivalry)	W 34–27	23,262	
September 28	No. 19 Air Force	University Stadium; Albuquerque, NM	L 12–49	27,124	
October 5	at No. 13 Nebraska*	Memorial Stadium; Lincoln, NE	L 7–38	75,902	
October 12	Colorado State	University Stadium; Albuquerque, NM	L 28–45	18,713	
October 19	No. 9 BYU	University Stadium; Albuquerque, NM	L 23–45	20,918	
October 26	Hawaii^{†}	University Stadium; Albuquerque, NM	L 17–27	19,111	
November 2	at UTEP	Sun Bowl; El Paso, TX	W 27–23	32,849	
November 9	at Utah	Robert Rice Stadium; Salt Lake City, UT	L 49–58	26,124	
November 16	Wyoming	University Stadium; Albuquerque, NM	W 41–16	15,534	
November 23	at San Diego State	Jack Murphy Stadium; San Diego, CA	L 20–55	10,343	
*Non-conference game; ^{†}Homecoming; Rankings from AP Poll released prior to the game
