= Jim Laughton =

American football player (born 1960)

No. 89
- Position: Tight end

Personal information
- Born: January 18, 1960 (age 66); Salinas, California, U.S.
- Listed height: 6 ft 5 in (1.96 m)
- Listed weight: 225 lb (102 kg)

Career information
- High school: Salinas (Salinas, California)
- College: San Diego State
- NFL draft: 1986: undrafted

Career history
- Seattle Seahawks (1986)
- Stats at Pro Football Reference

James Edward Laughton (born January 18, 1960) is an American former professional football tight end. He played for the Seattle Seahawks in 1986.
