= 1985 Wyoming Cowboys football team =

American college football season

1985 Wyoming Cowboys football
- Conference: Western Athletic Conference
- Record: 3–8 (2–6 WAC)
- Head coach: Al Kincaid (5th season)
- Offensive scheme: Wishbone
- Captains: Pete Benedetti; Mitch Daum; Tim Gosar
- Home stadium: War Memorial Stadium

1985 Western Athletic Conference football standings
	Conf.					Overall
Team	W		L		T	W		L		T
No. 8 Air Force +	7	–	1	–	0	12	–	1	–	0
No. 16 BYU +	7	–	1	–	0	11	–	3	–	0
Utah	5	–	3	–	0	8	–	4	–	0
Hawaii	4	–	3	–	1	4	–	6	–	2
Colorado State	4	–	4	–	0	5	–	7	–	0
San Diego State	3	–	4	–	1	5	–	6	–	1
New Mexico	2	–	6	–	0	3	–	8	–	0
Wyoming	2	–	6	–	0	3	–	8	–	0
UTEP	1	–	7	–	0	1	–	10	–	0
+ – Conference co-champions; Rankings from AP Poll

The 1985 Wyoming Cowboys football team represented the University of Wyoming as a member of the Western Athletic Conference (WAC) during the 1985 NCAA Division I-A football season. Led by Al Kincaid in his fifth and final season as head coach, the Cowboys compiled a 3–8 record (2–6 against conference opponents), and finished seventh in the WAC. The team played home games on campus at War Memorial Stadium in Laramie, Wyoming.

After gaining their second win in the ninth game, athletic director Gary Cunningham fired Kincaid, who remained for the final two games.

== Schedule ==
Date	Opponent	Site	Result	Attendance	Source
September 7	at Baylor*	Baylor Stadium; Waco, TX	L 18–39	32,000	
September 14	Air Force	War Memorial Stadium; Laramie, WY	L 7–49	29,134	
September 21	Cal State Fullerton*	War Memorial Stadium; Laramie, WY	W 31–8	13,629	
September 28	Wisconsin*	War Memorial Stadium; Laramie, WY	L 17–41	11,129	
October 4	at Utah	Robert Rice Stadium; Salt Lake City, UT	L 20–37	33,248	
October 12	Hawaii	War Memorial Stadium; Laramie, WY (rivalry)	L 18–26	14,433	
October 26	Colorado State	War Memorial Stadium; Laramie, WY (rivalry)	L 19–30	13,702	
November 2	at No. 17 BYU	Cougar Stadium; Provo, UT	L 0–59	65,243	
November 9	San Diego State	War Memorial Stadium; Laramie, WY	W 41–20	1,946	
November 16	at New Mexico	University Stadium; Albuquerque, NM	L 16–41	15,534	
December 7	vs. UTEP	VFL Park; Melbourne, Australia (Australia Bowl)	W 23–21	19,107	
*Non-conference game; Rankings from AP Poll released prior to the game
