= 1986 New Mexico Lobos football team =

American college football season

1986 New Mexico Lobos football
- Conference: Western Athletic Conference
- Record: 4–8 (2–5 WAC)
- Head coach: Joe Lee Dunn (4th season)
- Home stadium: University Stadium

1986 Western Athletic Conference football standings
	Conf.					Overall
Team	W		L		T	W		L		T
San Diego State $	7	–	1	–	0	8	–	4	–	0
BYU	6	–	2	–	0	8	–	5	–	0
Air Force	5	–	2	–	0	6	–	5	–	0
Hawaii	4	–	4	–	0	7	–	5	–	0
Colorado State	4	–	4	–	0	6	–	5	–	0
Wyoming	4	–	4	–	0	6	–	6	–	0
New Mexico	2	–	5	–	0	4	–	8	–	0
UTEP	2	–	6	–	0	4	–	8	–	0
Utah	1	–	7	–	0	2	–	9	–	0
$ – Conference champion

The 1986 New Mexico Lobos football team was an American football team that represented the University of New Mexico in the Western Athletic Conference (WAC) during the 1986 NCAA Division I-A football season. In their fourth and final season under head coach Joe Lee Dunn, the Lobos compiled a 4–8 record (2–5 against WAC opponents) and were outscored by a total of 338 to 317.

The team's statistical leaders included Ned James with 1,777 passing yards, Kevin Burgess with 1,023 rushing yards and 72 points scored, and Terance Mathis with 955 receiving yards.

The first three road games were televised live in the Albuquerque market over KGSW 14 (now KLUZ-TV), while all of their home games were seen on same-night delay.

== Schedule ==
Date	Opponent	Site	Result	Attendance	Source
September 6	at No. 10 Tennessee*	Neyland Stadium; Knoxville, TN	L 21–35	93,875	
September 13	at No. 11 BYU	Cougar Stadium; Provo, UT	L 30–31	64,385	
September 20	at Texas Tech*	Jones Stadium; Lubbock, TX	L 7–14	36,520	
September 27	San Diego State	University Stadium; Albuquerque, NM	L 34–38	20,579	
October 4	at Hawaii	Aloha Stadium; Halawa, HI	L 10–27	46,119	
October 11	UTEP^{†}	University Stadium; Albuquerque, NM	W 24–22	18,170	
October 18	Utah	University Stadium; Albuquerque, NM	W 47–43	15,979	
October 25	New Mexico State*	University Stadium; Albuquerque, NM (rivalry)	W 45–14	17,392	
November 1	at Wyoming	War Memorial Stadium; Laramie, WY	L 25–35	6,714	
November 8	Tulsa*	University Stadium; Albuquerque, NM	L 27–34	11,372	
November 15	at Colorado State	Hughes Stadium; Fort Collins, CO	L 27–32	13,107	
November 22	at Memphis State*	Liberty Bowl Memorial Stadium; Memphis, TN	W 20–13	16,330	
*Non-conference game; ^{†}Homecoming; Rankings from AP Poll released prior to the game
