= 1980 New Mexico Lobos football team =

American college football season

1980 New Mexico Lobos football
- Conference: Western Athletic Conference
- Record: 4–7 (3–4 WAC)
- Head coach: Joe Morrison (1st season)
- Home stadium: University Stadium

1980 Western Athletic Conference football standings
	Conf.					Overall
Team	W		L		T	W		L		T
No. 12 BYU $	6	–	1	–	0	12	–	1	–	0
Colorado State	5	–	1	–	1	6	–	4	–	1
Hawaii	3	–	3	–	0	8	–	3	–	0
Wyoming	4	–	4	–	0	6	–	5	–	0
San Diego State	4	–	4	–	0	4	–	8	–	0
New Mexico	3	–	4	–	0	4	–	7	–	0
Utah	2	–	3	–	1	5	–	5	–	1
Air Force	1	–	3	–	0	2	–	9	–	1
UTEP	1	–	6	–	0	1	–	11	–	0
$ – Conference champion; Rankings from AP Poll

The 1980 New Mexico Lobos football team was an American football team that represented the University of New Mexico in the Western Athletic Conference (WAC) during the 1980 NCAA Division I-A football season. In their first season under head coach Joe Morrison, the Lobos compiled a 4–7 record (3–4 against WAC opponents) and were outscored by a total of 364 to 246.

The first game of the season proved to be most notable victory for the team, as the Lobos upset BYU, 25-21. The Jim McMahon-led Cougars went undefeated the rest of the season, finishing with a 12-1 record and #12 national ranking in the final Associated Press poll.

The team's statistical leaders included Robin Gabriel with 1,083 passing yards, Jimmy Sayers with 691 rushing yards, Ricky Martin with 850 receiving yards, and kicker Pete Parks with 58 points scored.

== Schedule ==
Date	Opponent	Site	Result	Attendance	Source
September 6	BYU	University Stadium; Albuquerque, NM	W 25–21	16,840	
September 13	at No. 17 Missouri*	Faurot Field; Columbia, MO	L 16–47	60,318	
September 20	at Texas Tech*	Jones Stadium; Lubbock, TX	L 17–28	38,873	
September 27	New Mexico State*	University Stadium; Albuquerque, NM (rivalry)	W 52–19	22,543	
October 4	at Wyoming	War Memorial Stadium; Laramie, WY	W 24–21	27,778	
October 11	Colorado State^{†}	University Stadium; Albuquerque, NM	L 26–31	19,154	
October 18	Hawaii	University Stadium; Albuquerque, NM	L 14–31	15,813	
October 25	at UTEP	Sun Bowl; El Paso, TX	W 22–21	17,008	
November 1	UNLV*	University Stadium; Albuquerque, NM	L 7–72	14,250	
November 8	at Utah	Robert Rice Stadium; Salt Lake City, UT	L 21–49	21,248	
November 22	at San Diego State	San Diego Stadium; San Diego, CA	L 22–24	21,900	
*Non-conference game; ^{†}Homecoming; Rankings from AP Poll released prior to the game

== Roster ==
1980 New Mexico Lobos football team roster
Players
Coaches
Offense

Pos.	#	Name	Class
QB	10	Jim Cappon	Sr
C	72	Chuck Esquivel	Sr
QB	12	Robin Gabriel	Jr
OT	74	Frank Giddens	Sr
C	68	Joe Juraszek	Sr
RB	30	Jimmy Sayers	Sr
WR	80	Derwin Williams	So
QB	15	Brad Wright	Sr

Defense

Pos.	#	Name	Class
DE	91	Mike Bair	Fr
DT	65	Alfonso Greenwood	Jr
LB	55	Brent Henson	Fr
LB	56	Jack Simpson	Jr
DB	17	Doug Smith	Sr
LB	38	Kelly Wilson	Jr

Special teams

Pos.	#	Name	Class
K	1	Pete Parks	So

Head coach

- Joe Morrison

Coordinators/assistant coaches

Legend

- (C) Team captain
- (S) Suspended
- (I) Ineligible
- Injured
- Redshirt
