= Travis Brown (wide receiver) =

American football player (born 1986)

Profile
- Position: Wide receiver

Personal information
- Born: July 26, 1986 (age 40); Memphis, Tennessee, U.S.
- Listed height: 6 ft 2 in (1.88 m)
- Listed weight: 198 lb (90 kg)

Career information
- High school: Hacienda Heights (CA) Los Altos
- College: New Mexico
- NFL draft: 2008: undrafted

Career history
- Seattle Seahawks (2008)*; Cincinnati Bengals (2008)*; Chicago Bears (2008)*; St. Louis Rams (2008–2010)*
- * Offseason or practice squad member only

Awards and highlights
- 2× First-team All-MW (2006, 2007)

Travis VaShon Brown (born July 26, 1986) is an American former football wide receiver. He was signed by the Seattle Seahawks as an undrafted free agent in 2008. He played college football at New Mexico.

Brown was also a member of the Cincinnati Bengals, Chicago Bears and St. Louis Rams.

== Early life ==
Brown was a 2004 graduate of Los Altos High School. He led his team to consecutive CIF Southern Section titles with him team going 14–0 in 2003 and 13–1 in 2002. Brown was First-team All-Conference as a senior when he caught 38 passes for 680 yards and 7 touchdowns. He also ran track with personal bests of 10.6 (100 meters), 21.7 (200) and 48.0 (400). He was also a three-year letterman in basketball and an honor roll student all four years with a 3.2 cumulative GPA.

== College career ==
Brown was a three-year starter at UNM and earned First-team All-MWC honors as a junior and senior. He finished his career with a reception in 37 consecutive games. As a senior, he had a career-high 76 catches and 1,031 receiving yards for a 13.6 yards per catch and a career-high 6 touchdown catches. In 2006, he earned First-team All-MWC honors after totaling 64 catches and 867 yards (13.5 avg.), career-high 4 touchdown catches. The previous season he started 10 of 11 games and had 35 receptions for 245 yards (7.0 avg.), including a long of 34 and 2 touchdowns. As a true freshman he played in 9 games, with 2 starts and made 7 catches for 49 yards (7.0 avg.).

== Professional career ==
Pre-draft measurables
Height	Weight	40-yard dash	10-yard split	20-yard split	20-yard shuttle	Three-cone drill	Vertical jump	Broad jump	Bench press
6 ft 2 1/8 in (1.88 m)	202 lb (92 kg)	4.49 s	1.53 s	2.57 s	4.38 s	7.18 s	34 in (0.86 m)	10 ft 0 in (3.05 m)	13 reps
40 (and splits) and broad jump from New Mexico Pro Day. All others from NFL Combine.

Brown re-signed with the St. Louis Rams on February 17, 2010. He was waived on May 4, 2010.
