= Marcus Smith (wide receiver) =

American football player (born 1985)

No. 81, 11
- Position: Wide receiver

Personal information
- Born: January 11, 1985 (age 41); San Diego, California, U.S.
- Listed height: 6 ft 1 in (1.85 m)
- Listed weight: 214 lb (97 kg)

Career information
- High school: Morse (San Diego)
- College: New Mexico
- NFL draft: 2008: 4th round, 106th overall pick

Career history
- Baltimore Ravens (2008–2011); Kentucky Drillers (2013); New Mexico Stars (2014); New Orleans VooDoo (2015)

Awards and highlights
- First-team All-MW (2007)

Career NFL statistics
- Games played: 21
- Total tackles: 10
- Stats at Pro Football Reference

Career AFL statistics
- Receptions: 31
- Receiving yards: 355
- Receiving touchdowns: 3
- Stats at ArenaFan.com

Marcus Anthony Smith (born January 11, 1985) is an American former professional football player who was a wide receiver in the National Football League (NFL). He was selected by the Baltimore Ravens in the fourth round of the 2008 NFL draft. Smith was released by Baltimore during final cuts on September 3, 2011. He played college football for the New Mexico Lobos.

== Early life ==
Smith prepped at Morse High School in San Diego.

College recruiting
Name	Hometown	School	Height	Weight	40^{‡}	Commit date
Marcus Smith; RB	San Diego, California	Morse High School	6 ft 3 in (1.91 m)	210 lb (95 kg)	--	Sep 29, 2007
Marcus Smith; RB	Recruit ratings: Scout: Rivals: (NR)					
Overall recruit ranking: Scout: -- (RB) Rivals: -- (RB), -- (CA)
Note: In many cases, Scout, Rivals, 247Sports, On3, and ESPN may conflict in their listings of height and weight.; In these cases, the average was taken. ESPN grades are on a 100-point scale.; Sources: "New Mexico Football Commitment List". Rivals.; "New Mexico College Football Recruiting Commits". Scout.; "Scout.com Team Recruiting Rankings". Scout.; "2003 Team Ranking". Rivals.com.

== College career ==
Smith played college football at the University of New Mexico and graduated in 2008. He was first-team Mountain West Conference for 2007.

=== Statistics ===
		Receiving							Rushing			Kickoff returns
Season	Team	GS	GP	Rec	Yds	Avg	TD	Long	Att	Yds	TD	Att	Yds	Avg	TD	Long
2004	New Mexico	12	0	3	33	11.0	0	14	14	150	2	15	232	15.5	0	39
2005	New Mexico	11	0	6	56	9.3	0	26	23	126	2	7	133	19.0	0	26
2006	New Mexico	13	12	53	859	16.2	9	61	7	23	0	18	335	18.6	0	30
2007	New Mexico	13	13	91	1,125	12.4	4	66	10	34	1	28	653	23.3	0	82
	Totals	49	25	153	2,073	13.5	13	66	54	333	5	68	1,353	19.9	0	82

== Professional career ==
=== Baltimore Ravens ===
Smith was selected by the Baltimore Ravens in the fourth round (106th overall) of the 2008 NFL draft. He signed a three-year contract with the team on July 18.

Smith played in only six games in 2008, he did not have any receptions but had six tackles on special teams as a gunner.

Smith missed all of the 2009 season after he tore his ACL in a preseason game.

Smith returned in 2010 and notched 21 special teams tackles. He was released by Baltimore during final cuts on September 3, 2011.

=== New Orleans VooDoo ===
On March 26, 2015, Smith was assigned to the New Orleans VooDoo of the Arena Football League. He was placed on reassignment on June 10, 2015.
