= Doug Aronson =

American football player (born 1964)

No. 61
- Position: Guard

Personal information
- Born: August 14, 1964 (age 62); San Francisco, California, U.S.
- Listed height: 6 ft 3 in (1.91 m)
- Listed weight: 293 lb (133 kg)

Career information
- High school: South San Francisco
- College: San Diego State
- NFL draft: 1987: undrafted

Career history
- Cincinnati Bengals (1987); Orlando Thunder (1991–1992)

Awards and highlights
- Third-team All-American (1986)
- Stats at Pro Football Reference

Douglas Aronson (born August 14, 1964) is an American former professional football player who was a guard for the Cincinnati Bengals of the National Football League (NFL). He played college football for the San Diego State Aztecs. He also played in the World League of American Football (WLAF) for the Orlando Thunder.
