= DonTrell Moore =

American football player (born 1982)

No. 22
- Position: Running back

Personal information
- Born: September 25, 1982 (age 44); Roswell, New Mexico, U.S.
- Listed height: 5 ft 9 in (1.75 m)
- Listed weight: 208 lb (94 kg)

Career information
- High school: Roswell (NM)
- College: New Mexico (2000–2005)
- NFL draft: 2006: undrafted

Career history
- New York Jets (2006)*; Tennessee Titans (2007)*; Tampa Bay Buccaneers (2007)*; Amarillo Venom (2010); New Mexico Stars (2012)
- * Offseason or practice squad member only

Awards and highlights
- MW Offensive Player of the Year (2005); MW Freshman of the Year (2002); 4× First-team All-MW (2002–2005)

DonTrell Jamar Moore (born September 25, 1982) is an American former football running back who played for two seasons in the Indoor Football League (IFL). He was signed by the New York Jets as an undrafted free agent after the 2006 NFL draft. Moore played college football for the New Mexico Lobos. Moore was featured in the documentary "Two Days in April", an in depth look into player preparation for the NFL draft.

== Early life ==
Born the son of Angela Moore who is an English teacher at Roswell High School, Moore also attended Roswell High School in Roswell, New Mexico. A starting running back for the Roswell High School Coyotes coached under Jack Cisco, Moore led the Coyotes to a state championship in his senior season. Moore's high school achievements include a spot on the 2000 Parade Magazine All-American team. Leading the state in rushing yards both his junior and senior year, Moore amassed 6,000 yards during his high school prep career. Moore was also an accomplished All-State cornerback, highlighted by his key interception to secure the win during the 2000 State Championship game. Moore's success off the field includes a 4.0 GPA.

== College career ==
Moore enrolled to the University of New Mexico in 2000 and would conclude his collegiate career as the most productive rusher in New Mexico and Mountain West Conference history. As a redshirt freshman, Moore earned Conference Freshman of the Year honours, concluding his freshman year with 1134 yards and 13 touchdowns. As a sophomore, Moore earned unanimous All-Mountain West Conference honours while setting personal and school rushing records, with 1450 yards on 276 carriers. Suffering a knee sprain in the second half versus NMSU, Moore's 30 consecutive game streak would end. The knee sprain Moore suffered would see him miss 3 games, but he remained the top rusher in the conference. By his senior year Moore's on the field success was being recognized, being featured by the NFL Draft Report and Sports Illustrated. Overcoming injuries Moore's senior year led to the nomination on the All-Mountain West Conference team choose and earned the league Offensive Player of the Year. He was inducted into the university Ring of Honor in 2021.

== NFL Combine ==
Moore was invited to the NFL Combine and his performance had him ranked 20th out of the 112 running backs at the combine

Height	Weight	40 yard	20 yard	10 yard	Bench press	Vertical	Broad jump	20 yard shuffle	3 Cone drill
5'9"	210	4.64	2.76	1.66	18	32	9'8"	4.34	7.12

== Professional career ==
=== NFL ===
Moore went undrafted in the 2006 NFL draft, but was eventually signed as an undrafted free-agent by the New York Jets. Waived on June 9, 2006, Moore would sign with the Tennessee Titans the following year. Never playing during a regular season game, Moore appeared in a pre-season game versus the New England Patriots rushing for 40 yards on 9 carries. That appearance was the only playing time Moore would see in the NFL, and it was the end of his career as a Tennessee Titan. Moore would eventually sign with the Tampa Bay Buccaneers in 2007, but would be waived that same year. Moore's NFL career was spent on practice and off-season squads, which led Moore to the Indoor Football League.

=== IFL ===
Signing with the Amarillo Venom in 2010, Moore's debut was a success scoring 4 touchdowns and rushing for 105 yards on 13 carriers. Moore's concluded his Venom career with a total of 22 touchdowns. In 2012 Moore signed with the debuting franchise the New Mexico Stars.

== Personal Information ==
Moore left football in 2013 after tearing his quadriceps tendon on his leg while jumping on a trampoline. This injury combined with past injuries led Moore off the football field and to the tennis court. Moore currently practices at the Lobo Tennis Club and aspires to play for the UTSA leagues. Graduating from the University of New Mexico with a degree in criminology, Moore now works at the Juvenile Detention Centre in Albuquerque as a youth program officer, assisting juvenile delinquents from the age 11-17. He was honored by the city of Roswell in a proclamation in 2022. He currently serves as the color analyst on New Mexico Football broadcasts on the Lobo Radio Network.

== See also ==
- List of Division I FBS rushing touchdown leaders
