= John Sullivan (kicker) =

American football player (born 1985)

No. 1
- Position: Placekicker

Personal information
- Born: January 6, 1985 (age 41); Fullerton, California, U.S.
- Listed height: 5 ft 10 in (1.78 m)
- Listed weight: 158 lb (72 kg)

Career information
- High school: Tehachapi (Tehachapi, California)
- College: New Mexico

Awards and highlights
- Consensus All-American (2007); First-team All-MW (2007)

John Sullivan (born January 6, 1985) is an American former college football placekicker who played for the New Mexico Lobos.

== Early life ==
John Fitzgerald Sullivan was born on January 6, 1985, in Fullerton, California. He played high school football at Tehachapi High School in Tehachapi, California and earned honorable mention all-area honors. He won the football team's scholar-athlete award. Sullivan also lettered in soccer and golf in high school, and was a two-time MVP in both sports. He graduated from Tehachapi in 2003.

== College career ==
Sullivan transferred to the University of New Mexico in the spring of 2004 from San Jose State University, where he did not play any games. He suffered a potentially career-ending torn ACL in spring 2007 but fully recovered without any surgery. He earned the starting placekicker job for the New Mexico Lobos his senior year in 2007 despite not having kicked in a game since high school in 2002.

Sullivan led all of Division I in field goals made in 2007 with 29. He also led Division I with a 2.42 field goals per game average, the highest total in college football since 1984. He made a school record 18 straight field goals. Sullivan was named a consensus All-American. He also earned first-team All-Mountain West Conference honors. He majored in exercise science at New Mexico. Sullivan stood 5'10" and weighed 158 pounds.

== Post-playing career ==
Sullivan was rated the tenth best placekicker in the 2008 NFL draft. Despite being a consensus All-American, he never signed with an NFL team. After his college career, he graduated from California State University, Fresno with a master’s degree in sports management. He then worked for the Mountain West Conference, serving as championship coordinator from 2010 to 2014, assistant commissioner for championships from 2015 to 2017, and associate commissioner from 2018 to 2021. In 2022, Sullivan was named the deputy commissioner and chief operating officer of the Southland Conference.

== Personal life ==
Sullivan's father played football and rugby at Cerritos College and Cal State Los Angeles.
