= Donald Sellers =

American football player (1974–2001)

No. 4
- Position: Wide receiver

Personal information
- Born: December 30, 1974; Phoenix, Arizona, U.S.
- Died: February 11, 2001 (aged 26); Wickenburg, Arizona, U.S.
- Listed height: 6 ft 0 in (1.83 m)
- Listed weight: 195 lb (88 kg)

Career information
- High school: Ellison (Killeen, Texas)
- College: New Mexico
- NFL draft: 1997: undrafted

Career history
- St. Louis Rams (1997–1998); Scottish Claymores (1999); Philadelphia Eagles (1999)*; Denver Broncos (2000)*; Chicago Bears (2000)*; Carolina Panthers (2000)*; Tennessee Titans (2000)*; Las Vegas Outlaws (2001)
- * Offseason or practice squad member only

Awards and highlights
- NJCAA National Championship (1994)

Donald Ray Sellers (December 30, 1974 – February 11, 2001) was an American professional football player, playing professionally at wide receiver for the Scottish Claymores of NFL Europe.

Sellers attended Ellison High School in Killeen, Texas and was a two-year letterman in football, basketball, and baseball. He also played at University of New Mexico and Trinity Valley Community College as a quarterback.

Sellers died in a car crash on February 11, 2001, after losing control of his vehicle outside Wickenburg, Arizona and hitting an oncoming car.

In 2010, he was inducted into the Trinity Valley Community College Hall of Fame.

== See also ==
- List of gridiron football players who died during their careers
