= 1985 Notre Dame Fighting Irish football team =

American college football season

1985 Notre Dame Fighting Irish football
- Conference: Independent
- Record: 5–6
- Head coach: Gerry Faust (5th season)
- Defensive coordinator: A. J. Christoff (2nd season)
- MVP: Allen Pinkett
- Captains: Tony Furjanic; Mike Larkin; Allen Pinkett; Tim Scannell
- Home stadium: Notre Dame Stadium

1985 NCAA Division I-A independents football records
	Conf.					Overall
Team	W		L		T	W		L		T
No. 3 Penn State		–		–		11	–	1	–	0
No. 9 Miami (FL)		–		–		10	–	2	–	0
Army		–		–		9	–	3	–	0
No. 15 Florida State		–		–		9	–	3	–	0
West Virginia		–		–		7	–	3	–	1
Southern Miss		–		–		7	–	4	–	0
Syracuse		–		–		7	–	5	–	0
Virginia Tech		–		–		6	–	5	–	0
Pittsburgh		–		–		5	–	5	–	1
Cincinnati		–		–		5	–	6	–	0
Notre Dame		–		–		5	–	6	–	0
South Carolina		–		–		5	–	6	–	0
Southwestern Louisiana		–		–		4	–	7	–	0
Navy		–		–		4	–	7	–	0
Temple		–		–		4	–	7	–	0
Boston College		–		–		4	–	8	–	0
Memphis State		–		–		2	–	7	–	2
Rutgers		–		–		2	–	8	–	1
East Carolina		–		–		2	–	9	–	0
Louisville		–		–		2	–	9	–	0
Tulane		–		–		1	–	10	–	0
Rankings from AP Poll

The 1985 Notre Dame Fighting Irish football team was an American football team that represented the University of Notre Dame as an independent during the 1985 NCAA Division I-A football season. In their fifth and final year under head coach Gerry Faust, the Irish compiled a 5–6 record, were outscored by a total of 234 to 230, and were unranked for the fifth consecutive year in the final AP and UPI polls.

Guard Tim Scannell received first-team honors from Scripps-Howard on the 1985 All-America college football team. The team's statistical leaders included quarterback Steve Beuerlein (1,335 passing yards), running back Allen Pinkett (1,100 rushing yards, 66 points scored), Tim Brown (25 receptions, 397 receiving yards), and linebacker Tony Furjanic (147 tackles).

The team played its home games at Notre Dame Stadium in Notre Dame, Indiana.

== Schedule ==
Date	Time	Opponent	Rank	Site	TV	Result	Attendance	Source
September 14	2:30 p.m.	at Michigan	No. 13	Michigan Stadium; Ann Arbor, MI (rivalry)	CBS	L 12–20	105,523	
September 21	7:30 p.m.	Michigan State		Notre Dame Stadium; Notre Dame, IN (rivalry)	ESPN	W 27–10	59,075	
September 28	12:00 p.m.	at Purdue		Ross–Ade Stadium; West Lafayette, IN (rivalry)	TBS	L 17–35	69,338	
October 5	3:30 p.m.	at No. 17 Air Force		Falcon Stadium; Colorado Springs, CO (rivalry)	ABC	L 15–21	52,153	
October 19	12:00 p.m.	No. 19 Army		Notre Dame Stadium; Notre Dame, IN (rivalry)	USA, WGN	W 24–10	59,075	
October 26	2:00 p.m.	USC		Notre Dame Stadium; Notre Dame, IN (rivalry)		W 37–3	59,075	
November 2	3:30 p.m.	Navy		Notre Dame Stadium; Notre Dame, IN (rivalry)	ABC	W 41–17	59,075	
November 9	12:00 p.m.	Ole Miss		Notre Dame Stadium; Notre Dame, IN	USA, WGN	W 37–14	59,075	
November 16	3:30 p.m.	at No. 1 Penn State		Beaver Stadium; University Park, PA (rivalry)	ABC	L 6–36	84,000	
November 23	12:00 p.m.	No. 17 LSU		Notre Dame Stadium; Notre Dame, IN	USA, WGN	L 7–10	59,075	
November 30	3:30 p.m.	at No. 4 Miami (FL)		Miami Orange Bowl; Miami, FL (rivalry)	CBS	L 7–58	49,236	
Rankings from AP Poll released prior to the game; All times are in Eastern time

== Game summaries ==
=== at Michigan ===
Notre Dame at Michigan

Team	1	2	3	4	Total
No. 13 Fighting Irish	3	6	3	0	12
• Wolverines	0	3	14	3	20

- Date: September 14
- Location: Michigan Stadium, Ann Arbor, MI
- Game start: 3:30 pm
- Game attendance: 105,523
- TV announcers (CBS): Brent Musburger (play-by-play) and Ara Parseghian (analyst)

Scoring summary
1		ND	John Carney 34-yard field goal	ND 3–0
2		ND	John Carney 37-yard field goal	ND 6–0
2		Mich	Mike Gillette 21-yard field goal	ND 6–3
2		ND	John Carney 47-yard field goal	ND 9–3
3		Mich	Jim Harbaugh 10-yard run (Gillette kick)	Michigan 10–9
3		ND	John Carney 25-yard field goal	ND 12–10
3		Mich	Gerald White 3-yard run (Gillette kick)	Mich 17–12
4	5:12	Mich	Mike Gillette 22-yard field goal	Mich 20–12

=== Army ===
Team	1	2	3	4	Total
Cadets	0	7	3	0	10
• Notre Dame	14	0	7	3	24

- Date: Saturday, October 19
- Location: Notre Dame Stadium, South Bend, IN
- Game attendance: 59,075

Scoring summary
1		ND	Pernell Taylor 1-yard run (John Carney kick)	ND 7-0
1		ND	Tim Brown 19-yard pass from Steve Beuerlein (John Carney kick)	ND 14-0
2		ARMY	Bill Lampley 4-yard run (Craig Stopa kick)	ND 14-7
3		ARMY	Craig Stopa 22-yard field goal	ND 14-10
3		ND	Allen Pinkett 1-yard run (John Carney kick)	ND 21-10
4	6:23	ND	John Carney 21-yard field goal	ND 24-10

=== USC ===
Notre Dame played the first half in navy blue jerseys and changed into green jerseys for the second half.

USC at Notre Dame

Team	1	2	3	4	Total
Trojans	0	0	3	0	3
• Fighting Irish	14	13	3	7	37

- Date: October 26
- Location: Notre Dame Stadium, South Bend, IN

Scoring summary
1	ND	Pinkett 2-yard run (Carney kick)	ND 7-0
1	ND	Beuerlein 6-yard run (Carney kick)	ND 14-0
2	ND	Carney 26-yard field goal	ND 17-0
2	ND	Stams 5-yard run (Carney kick)	ND 24-0
2	ND	Carney 33-yard field goal	ND 27-0
3	USC	Shafer 39-yard field goal	ND 27-3
3	ND	Carney 43-yard field goal	ND 30-3
4	ND	Williams 8-yard pass from Andrysiak (Carney kick)	ND 37-3

=== Ole Miss ===
Notre Dame finally had the opportunity to exact revenge on the Rebels for a 20–13 loss at Jackson eight years earlier.

Ole Miss at Notre Dame

Team	1	2	3	4	Total
Rebels	0	0	0	14	14
• Fighting Irish	3	14	14	7	38

- Date: November 9
- Location: Notre Dame Stadium • South Bend, Indiana

Scoring summary
1	ND	Carney 41-yard field goal	Notre Dame 3-0
2	ND	Pinkett 1-yard run (Carney kick)	Notre Dame 10-0
2	ND	Brown 14-yard pass from Beuerlein (Carney kick)	Notre Dame 17-0
3	ND	Pinkett 2-yard run (Carney kick)	Notre Dame 24-0
3	ND	Redher 22-yard pass from Beuerlein (Carney kick)	Notre Dame 31-0
4	MISS	Meyers 10-yard pass from Osgood (Owen kick)	Notre Dame 31-7
4	MISS	Cleveland 1-yard run (Owen kick)	Notre Dame 31-14
4	ND	Southall 7-yard run (Carney kick)	Notre Dame 38-14

=== at No. 1 Penn State ===
Notre Dame at Penn State

Team	1	2	3	4	Total
Fighting Irish	0	0	0	6	6
• No. 1 Nittany Lions	7	13	10	6	36

- Date: November 16
- Location: Beaver Stadium, College Pennsylvania, PA
- Game attendance: 84,000
- TV announcers (ABC): Keith Jackson (play-by-play), Frank Broyles (analyst), and Tim Brant (sideline)

=== No. 17 LSU ===
Ironically, Gerry Faust's last game in Notre Dame Stadium was against the same school he faced in his first game as Irish coach four years earlier.

LSU at Notre Dame

Team	1	2	3	4	Total
• No. 17 Tigers	0	3	0	7	10
Fighting Irish	7	0	0	0	7

- Date: November 23
- Location:
  Notre Dame Stadium,
  South Bend, Indiana
- Game start: 12:30 p.m. EST
- Game attendance: 59,075
- Game weather: 33 degrees, cloudy with snow flurries
- Referee: Raymond Bower
- TV announcers (USA): Harry Kalas and Jack Ham

Scoring summary
1	9:26	ND	Tim Brown 18-yard run (John Carney kick)	ND 7–0
2	0:00	LSU	Matt DeFrank 27-yard field goal	ND 7–3
4	3:26		Garry James 2-yard run (Ron Lewis kick)	LSU 10–7

=== at No. 4 Miami (FL) ===
Notre Dame at Miami (FL)

Team	1	2	3	4	Total
Fighting Irish	0	7	0	0	7
• No. 4 Hurricanes	13	14	10	21	58

- Date: November 30
- Location: Miami Orange Bowl, Miami
- Game start: 3:30 p.m. EST
- TV announcers (CBS): Brent Musburger and Ara Parseghian

Scoring summary
1		MIA	Greg Cox 39-yard field goal	MIA 3-0
1		MIA	W. Williams 6-yard run (Greg Cox kick)	MIA 10-0
1		MIA	Greg Cox 47-yard field goal	MIA 13-0
2		MIA	Bennie Blades 61-yard interception return (Cox kick)	MIA 20-0
2		ND	Allen Pinkett 3-yard run (John Carney kick)	MIA 20-7
2		MIA	Melvin Bratton 7-yard pass from Vinny Testaverde (Cox kick)	MIA 27-7
3		MIA	Greg Cox 48-yard field goal	MIA 30-7
3		MIA	Michael Irvin 15-yard pass from Vinny Testaverde (Greg Cox kick)	MIA 37-7
4		MIA	Vinny Testaverde 1-yard run (Greg Cox kick)	MIA 44-7
4		MIA	Andre Brown 17-yard pass from Geoff Torretta (Seelig kick)	MIA 51-7
4	4:44	MIA	Bill Hawkins recovered blocked punt in end zone (Greg Cox kick)	MIA 58-7

== Roster ==
1985 Notre Dame Fighting Irish football team roster
Players
Coaches
Offense

Pos.	#	Name	Class
QB	2	Terry Andrysiak	So
QB	7	Steve Beuerlein	Jr
WR	81	Tim Brown	So
RB	20	Allen Pinkett	Sr
FB	30	Frank Stams	Fr

Defense

Pos.	#	Name	Class
SS	40	Pat Ballage	Sr
LB	43	Rick DiBernardo	Sr
DE	71	Eric Dorsey	Sr
LB	48	Cedric Figaro	So
LB	58	Tony Furjanic	Sr

Special teams

Pos.	#	Name	Class
K	18	John Carney	Jr

Head coach

- Gerry Faust

Coordinators/assistant coaches

Legend

- (C) Team captain
- (S) Suspended
- (I) Ineligible
- Injured
- Redshirt

== Awards and honors ==
- Allen Pinkett finished 8th in voting for the Heisman Trophy.
- Guard Tim Scannell received first-team honors from Scripps Howard News Service on the 1985 All-America college football team.
- Former Fighting Irish players Paul Hornung and Jim Martin were inducted into the College Football Hall of Fame

== 1986 NFL draft ==
The following Notre Dame players were selected in the 1986 NFL draft:

Player	Position	Round	Pick	NFL club
Eric Dorsey	Defensive end	1	19	NY Giants
Allen Pinkett	Running back	3	61	Houston Oilers
Tony Furjanic	Linebacker	8	202	Buffalo Bills
Mike Perrino	Tackle	8	209	San Diego Chargers
