= 1985 Army Cadets football team =

American college football season

1985 Army Cadets football

Peach Bowl champion

Peach Bowl, W 31–29 vs. Illinois
- Conference: Independent
- Record: 9–3
- Head coach: Jim Young (3rd season)
- Offensive scheme: Triple option
- Defensive coordinator: Bob Sutton (3rd season)
- Base defense: 4–3
- Captains: Kurt Gutierrez; Don Smith
- Home stadium: Michie Stadium

1985 NCAA Division I-A independents football records
	Conf.					Overall
Team	W		L		T	W		L		T
No. 3 Penn State		–		–		11	–	1	–	0
No. 9 Miami (FL)		–		–		10	–	2	–	0
Army		–		–		9	–	3	–	0
No. 15 Florida State		–		–		9	–	3	–	0
West Virginia		–		–		7	–	3	–	1
Southern Miss		–		–		7	–	4	–	0
Syracuse		–		–		7	–	5	–	0
Virginia Tech		–		–		6	–	5	–	0
Pittsburgh		–		–		5	–	5	–	1
Cincinnati		–		–		5	–	6	–	0
Notre Dame		–		–		5	–	6	–	0
South Carolina		–		–		5	–	6	–	0
Southwestern Louisiana		–		–		4	–	7	–	0
Navy		–		–		4	–	7	–	0
Temple		–		–		4	–	7	–	0
Boston College		–		–		4	–	8	–	0
Memphis State		–		–		2	–	7	–	2
Rutgers		–		–		2	–	8	–	1
East Carolina		–		–		2	–	9	–	0
Louisville		–		–		2	–	9	–	0
Tulane		–		–		1	–	10	–	0
Rankings from AP Poll

The 1985 Army Cadets football team represented the United States Military Academy as an independent during the 1985 NCAA Division I-A football season as an independent. The team was led by head coach Jim Young, in his third year, and played their home games at Michie Stadium in West Point, New York. They finished the season with a record of nine wins and three losses (9–3 overall), and with a victory against Illinois in the Peach Bowl. Starting off with wins in each of their first five games, the Cadets were ranked by the AP Poll at 19th prior to the game against Notre Dame. It was the first time Army was ranked in 23 years; Army would not be ranked in an AP Poll again until 1996. The Cadets offense scored 396 points, while the defense allowed 232 points.

== Schedule ==
Date	Opponent	Rank	Site	Result	Attendance	Source
September 14	Western Michigan		Michie Stadium; West Point, NY	W 48–6	28,620	
September 21	Rutgers		Michie Stadium; West Point, NY	W 20–16	39,732	
September 28	at Penn		Franklin Field; Philadelphia, PA	W 41–3	23,765	
October 5	Yale		Michie Stadium; West Point, NY	W 59–16	40,415	
October 12	Boston College		Michie Stadium; West Point, NY	W 45–14	40,525	
October 19	at Notre Dame	No. 19	Notre Dame Stadium; Notre Dame, IN (rivalry)	L 10–24	59,075	
October 26	Colgate		Michie Stadium; West Point, NY	W 45–43	40,063	
November 2	Holy Cross		Michie Stadium; West Point, NY	W 34–12	40,236	
November 9	at No. 5 Air Force		Falcon Stadium; Colorado Springs, CO (Commander-in-Chief's Trophy)	L 7–45	51,103	
November 16	Memphis State		Michie Stadium; West Point, NY	W 49–7	34,000	
December 7	vs. Navy		Veterans Stadium; Philadelphia, PA (Army–Navy Game)	L 7–17	71,640	
December 31	vs. Illinois		Atlanta–Fulton County Stadium; Atlanta, GA (Peach Bowl)	W 31–29	29,857	
Rankings from AP Poll released prior to the game

== Game summaries ==
=== Western Michigan ===
- Clarence Jones 110 rush yards

=== Yale ===
Yale Bulldogs at Army Cadets (3–0)

Quarter	1	2	3	4	Total
Yale	0	6	3	7	16
Army	7	17	14	21	59

at Michie Stadium, West Point, New York

- Date: October 5, 1985
- Game attendance: 40,415
- Most points Army scored since 1958
- Craig Stopa's 53-yard field goal in the second quarter was a school record
- Tory Crawford replaced injured Rob Healy (cracked ribs)

Team	Category	Player	Statistics
Yale	Passing	Mike Curtin	11/20, 120 Yds, INT
Yale	Rushing	Red Macauley	15 Rush, 43 Yds
Yale	Receiving	Kevin Moriarty	5 Rec, 68 Yds
Army	Passing	Rob Healy	3/3, 51 Yds, TD
Army	Rushing	Doug Black	15 Rush, 122 Yds, TD
Army	Receiving	Scott Spellmon	1 Rec, 42 Yds, TD

Scoring summary

Quarter	Time	Drive			Team	Scoring information	Score	
Quarter	Time	Plays	Yards	TOP	Team	Scoring information	YALE	ARMY
1			73		Army	William Lampley 7-yard touchdown run, Craig Stopa kick good	0	7
2					Army	Benny White 33-yard touchdown reception from Rob Healy, Craig Stopa kick good	0	14
2					Yale	Red Macauley 11-yard touchdown reception from Kelly Ryan, 2-point run failed	6	14
2			79		Army	Doug Black 2-yard touchdown run, Craig Stopa kick good	6	21
2					Army	53-yard field goal by Craig Stopa	6	24
3					Yale	27-yard field goal by John Duryea	9	24
3					Army	Tory Crawford 4-yard touchdown run, Craig Stopa kick good	9	31
3					Army	Scott Spellmon 42-yard touchdown reception from Tory Crawford, Craig Stopa kick good	9	38
4					Army	Kevin McKelvy 18-yard touchdown run, Craig Stopa kick good	9	45
4					Army	Alan Edwards 6-yard touchdown run, Craig Stopa kick good	9	52
4					Army	Ed Cole 3-yard touchdown run, Keith Walker kick good	9	59
4					Yale	Troxell 9-yard touchdown reception from Andrews, Cucci kick good	16	59
"TOP" = time of possession. For other American football terms, see Glossary of American football.							16	59

=== At Boston College ===
- Tory Crawford (first start) 131 rush yards, three TDs [ECAC Offensive Player of the Week]
- Clarence Jones 103 rush yards

=== At Notre Dame ===
Team	1	2	3	4	Total
Cadets	0	7	3	0	10
• Fighting Irish	14	0	7	3	24

- Date: Saturday, October 19
- Location: Notre Dame Stadium, South Bend, IN
- Game attendance: 59,075

Scoring summary
1		ND	Pernell Taylor 1-yard run (John Carney kick)	ND 7-0
1		ND	Tim Brown 19-yard pass from Steve Beuerlein (John Carney kick)	ND 14-0
2		ARMY	Bill Lampley 4-yard run (Craig Stopa kick)	ND 14-7
3		ARMY	Craig Stopa 22-yard field goal	ND 14-10
3		ND	Allen Pinkett 1-yard run (John Carney kick)	ND 21-10
4	6:23	ND	John Carney 21-yard field goal	ND 24-10

=== Colgate ===
- Tory Crawford (off the bench) 136 rush yards

=== Holy Cross ===
- Tory Crawford 134 rush yards, 2 TDs [ECAC Offensive Player of the Week]

=== vs Navy ===
Army Cadets (8–2) vs. Navy Midshipmen (3–7)

Quarter	1	2	3	4	Total
Navy	7	0	0	10	17
Army	7	0	0	0	7

at Veterans Stadium, Philadelphia, Pennsylvania

- Date: December 7, 1985
- Game time: 2:30 p.m. EDT
- Game attendance: 71,640
- TV announcers (CBS): Brent Musburger and Ara Parseghian

Game information

First quarter

- NAVY – Troy Saunders 13-yard pass from Bob Misch (Todd Solomon kick), 6:54. Navy 7–0. Drive: 16 plays, 73 yards.
- ARMY – Clarence Jones 10-yard run (kick good). Tie 7–7.

Second quarter

- No scoring

Third quarter

- No scoring

Fourth quarter

- NAVY – Chuck Smith 5-yard run (Todd Solomon kick), 8:26. Navy 14–7.
- NAVY – Todd Solomon 26-yard field goal, 1:15. Navy 17–7.

Top rushers

- NAVY – Napoleon McCallum – 41 rushes, 217 yards

With Vice President and former Navy pilot George Bush in attendance, Napoleon McCallum rushed for 217 yards, the second-most rushing yards by a Navy player against Army, and broke the NCAA single-season all-purpose yardage record of Pitt's Tony Dorsett.

External videos
- 1985 Army vs. Navy – Television broadcast

=== Peach Bowl (vs Illinois) ===
Illinois vs. Army

Team	1	2	3	4	Total
Fighting Illini	3	13	7	6	29
• Cadets	7	14	7	3	31

- Date: December 31
- Location:
  Fulton County Stadium,
  Atlanta, Georgia
- Game attendance: 29,857
- TV announcers (CBS): Gary Bender and Steve Davis

== Roster ==
1985 Army Cadets football team roster
Players
Coaches
Offense

Pos.	#	Name	Class
FB	32	Doug Black	Sr
RB	31	Ed Cole	Jr
QB	9	Tory Crawford	So
WR	80	Rob Dickerson	Jr
QB	19	Alan Edwards	Jr
RB		Erik Gunhus
QB	7	Rob Healy	Sr
RB	34	Ron Herring	So
RB	40	Clarence Jones	Jr
RB	21	Bill Kim	So
RB	20	William Lampley	Jr
OT	51	Joe Manausa	Jr
RB	45	Kelvin McKelvey	Sr
QB	11	Mark Mooney	Fr
RB		Rod Mullins
OL		Bryan Parlier	Sr
WR	47	Andy Peterson	So
OL	50	Clint Politt	Jr
C	56	Ron Rice	Sr
QB	10	Mike Ryan	Jr
OT	57	Ed Shultz	So
G	79	Don Smith	Sr
RB	26	Paolo Smith	Jr
WR	4	Scott Spellmon	Sr
WR	6	Ben White	Jr
RB	28	Benny Wright	Jr

Defense

Pos.	#	Name	Class
LB	52	Larry Biggins	Jr
DL	69	Jay Bridge	Sr
DL	94	Jim Brock	Jr
DB	22	Matt Buckner	Sr
S	33	Peel Chronister	Jr
DB	16	Reggie Fullwood	Jr
DE	98	Kurt Gutierrez	Sr
DL	87	Bob Kleinhample	Sr
DB	13	Darold Lando	Sr
DL	44	Tom Malloy	Sr
DB	27	Doug Pavek	Sr
DL	81	Craig Rollins	Sr
LB	90	Dave Scheyer	Jr
DB	14	John Thomson	Sr
DL	73	Lloyd Walker	Sr

Special teams

Pos.	#	Name	Class
P	93	Bit Rambusch	Fr
K	1	Craig Stopa	Sr
K	39	Keith Walker	Fr

Head coach

- Jim Young

Coordinators/assistant coaches

Legend

- (C) Team captain
- (S) Suspended
- (I) Ineligible
- Injured
- Redshirt
