= 1985 East Carolina Pirates football team =

American college football season

1985 East Carolina Pirates football
- Conference: Independent
- Record: 2–9
- Head coach: Art Baker (1st season)
- Defensive coordinator: Don Powers (1st season)
- Home stadium: Ficklen Memorial Stadium

1985 NCAA Division I-A independents football records
| | Conf. | | | | | Overall |
| Team | W | | L | | T | W | | L | | T |
|---|---|---|---|---|---|---|---|---|---|---|
| No. 3 Penn State | | – | | – | | 11 | – | 1 | – | 0 |
| No. 9 Miami (FL) | | – | | – | | 10 | – | 2 | – | 0 |
| Army | | – | | – | | 9 | – | 3 | – | 0 |
| No. 15 Florida State | | – | | – | | 9 | – | 3 | – | 0 |
| West Virginia | | – | | – | | 7 | – | 3 | – | 1 |
| Southern Miss | | – | | – | | 7 | – | 4 | – | 0 |
| Syracuse | | – | | – | | 7 | – | 5 | – | 0 |
| Virginia Tech | | – | | – | | 6 | – | 5 | – | 0 |
| Pittsburgh | | – | | – | | 5 | – | 5 | – | 1 |
| Cincinnati | | – | | – | | 5 | – | 6 | – | 0 |
| Notre Dame | | – | | – | | 5 | – | 6 | – | 0 |
| South Carolina | | – | | – | | 5 | – | 6 | – | 0 |
| Southwestern Louisiana | | – | | – | | 4 | – | 7 | – | 0 |
| Navy | | – | | – | | 4 | – | 7 | – | 0 |
| Temple | | – | | – | | 4 | – | 7 | – | 0 |
| Boston College | | – | | – | | 4 | – | 8 | – | 0 |
| Memphis State | | – | | – | | 2 | – | 7 | – | 2 |
| Rutgers | | – | | – | | 2 | – | 8 | – | 1 |
| East Carolina | | – | | – | | 2 | – | 9 | – | 0 |
| Louisville | | – | | – | | 2 | – | 9 | – | 0 |
| Tulane | | – | | – | | 1 | – | 10 | – | 0 |
Rankings from AP Poll

The 1985 East Carolina Pirates football team was an American football team that represented East Carolina University as an independent during the 1985 NCAA Division I-A football season. In their first season under head coach Art Baker, the team compiled a 2–9 record.

== Schedule ==
| Date | Opponent | Site | TV | Result | Attendance | Source |
|---|---|---|---|---|---|---|
| September 7 | at NC State | Carter–Finley Stadium; Raleigh, NC (rivalry) | | W 33–14 | 58,300 | |
| September 14 | Southwest Texas State | Ficklen Memorial Stadium; Greenville, NC | | W 27–16 | 28,411 | |
| September 21 | at No. 10 Penn State | Beaver Stadium; University Park, PA | | L 10–17 | 84,266 | |
| September 28 | Temple | Ficklen Memorial Stadium; Greenville, NC | | L 7–21 | 32,087 | |
| October 5 | Miami (FL) | Ficklen Memorial Stadium; Greenville, NC | | L 15–27 | 34,511 | |
| October 12 | at Southwestern Louisiana | Cajun Field; Lafayette, LA | | L 14–16 | 16,228 | |
| October 19 | South Carolina | Ficklen Memorial Stadium; Greenville, NC | | L 10–52 | 35,047 | |
| November 2 | at Southern Miss | M. M. Roberts Stadium; Hattiesburg, MS | | L 0–27 | 23,496 | |
| November 9 | at No. 13 Auburn | Jordan–Hare Stadium; Auburn, AL | | L 10–35 | 65,600 | |
| November 16 | Tulsa | Ficklen Memorial Stadium; Greenville, NC | | L 20–21 | 23,126 | |
| December 7 | at No. 12 LSU | Tiger Stadium; Baton Rouge, LA | TigerVision | L 15–35 | 65,660 | |
Rankings from AP Poll released prior to the game

== Roster ==
1985 East Carolina Pirates football team roster
Players
Coaches
Offense

| Pos. | # | Name | Class |
|---|---|---|---|
| RB | 43 | Tony Baker | Sr |
| G | 77 | Tim Orr | Fr |
| QB | 4 | Brad Walsh | Fr |

Defense

| Pos. | # | Name | Class |
|---|---|---|---|
| DB | 19 | Ellis Dillahunt | So |
| LB | 44 | Vinson Smith | So |
| DB | 37 | Kevin Walker | Sr |
| DT | | Randy Watts |

Special teams

| Pos. | # | Name | Class |

Head coach

- Art Baker

Coordinators/assistant coaches

- Ellis Johnson (Outside linebackers)
- Kenny Phillips (Graduate assistant)

Legend

- (C) Team captain
- (S) Suspended
- (I) Ineligible
- Injured
- Redshirt
