= 1985 Cincinnati Bearcats football team =

American college football season

1985 Cincinnati Bearcats football
- Conference: Independent
- Record: 5–6
- Head coach: Dave Currey (2nd season)
- Defensive coordinator: Robin Ross (2nd season)
- Captains: Nick Frankos; Reggie Taylor
- Home stadium: Riverfront Stadium, Nippert Stadium

1985 NCAA Division I-A independents football records
	Conf.					Overall
Team	W		L		T	W		L		T
No. 3 Penn State		–		–		11	–	1	–	0
No. 9 Miami (FL)		–		–		10	–	2	–	0
Army		–		–		9	–	3	–	0
No. 15 Florida State		–		–		9	–	3	–	0
West Virginia		–		–		7	–	3	–	1
Southern Miss		–		–		7	–	4	–	0
Syracuse		–		–		7	–	5	–	0
Virginia Tech		–		–		6	–	5	–	0
Pittsburgh		–		–		5	–	5	–	1
Cincinnati		–		–		5	–	6	–	0
Notre Dame		–		–		5	–	6	–	0
South Carolina		–		–		5	–	6	–	0
Southwestern Louisiana		–		–		4	–	7	–	0
Navy		–		–		4	–	7	–	0
Temple		–		–		4	–	7	–	0
Boston College		–		–		4	–	8	–	0
Memphis State		–		–		2	–	7	–	2
Rutgers		–		–		2	–	8	–	1
East Carolina		–		–		2	–	9	–	0
Louisville		–		–		2	–	9	–	0
Tulane		–		–		1	–	10	–	0
Rankings from AP Poll

The 1985 Cincinnati Bearcats football team represented the University of Cincinnati during the 1985 NCAA Division I-A football season. The Bearcats, led by head coach Dave Currey, participated as independent and played their home games at Riverfront Stadium. On-campus Nippert Stadium was used as a supplement.

== Schedule ==
Date	Time	Opponent	Site	Result	Attendance	Source
August 31		Virginia Tech	Nippert Stadium; Cincinnati, OH	W 31–14	15,762	
September 7		Austin Peay	Nippert Stadium; Cincinnati, OH	W 31–9	18,207	
September 14		at Youngstown State	Stambaugh Stadium; Youngstown, OH	W 29–27	12,124	
September 21	2:30 p.m.	at No. 16 Alabama	Bryant–Denny Stadium; Tuscaloosa, AL	L 10–45	58,714	
September 28		at Kentucky	Commonwealth Stadium; Lexington, KY	L 7–27	57,192	
October 5		Temple	Riverfront Stadium; Cincinnati, OH	L 16–28	12,103	
October 12		at Miami (FL)	Miami Orange Bowl; Miami, FL	L 0–38	30,164	
October 19		at Louisville	Cardinal Stadium; Louisville, KY (rivalry)	W 31–9	21,283	
October 26		Boston College	Riverfront Stadium; Cincinnati, OH	W 24–17	17,217	
November 9		No. 2 Penn State	Riverfront Stadium; Cincinnati, OH	L 10–31	33,528	
November 23		at Miami (OH)	Yager Stadium; Oxford, OH (Victory Bell)	L 10–16	21,893	
Rankings from AP Poll released prior to the game; All times are in Eastern time
