= 1985 Florida State Seminoles football team =

American college football season

1985 Florida State Seminoles football

Gator Bowl champion

Gator Bowl, W 34–23 vs. Oklahoma State
- Conference: Independent

Ranking
- Coaches: No. 13
- AP: No. 15
- Record: 9–3
- Head coach: Bobby Bowden (10th season)
- Offensive coordinator: Wayne McDuffie (3rd season)
- Offensive scheme: No-huddle spread
- Defensive coordinator: Mickey Andrews (2nd season)
- Base defense: 4–3
- Captains: John Ionata; Todd Stroud; Kirk Coker
- Home stadium: Doak Campbell Stadium

1985 NCAA Division I-A independents football records
	Conf.					Overall
Team	W		L		T	W		L		T
No. 3 Penn State		–		–		11	–	1	–	0
No. 9 Miami (FL)		–		–		10	–	2	–	0
Army		–		–		9	–	3	–	0
No. 15 Florida State		–		–		9	–	3	–	0
West Virginia		–		–		7	–	3	–	1
Southern Miss		–		–		7	–	4	–	0
Syracuse		–		–		7	–	5	–	0
Virginia Tech		–		–		6	–	5	–	0
Pittsburgh		–		–		5	–	5	–	1
Cincinnati		–		–		5	–	6	–	0
Notre Dame		–		–		5	–	6	–	0
South Carolina		–		–		5	–	6	–	0
Southwestern Louisiana		–		–		4	–	7	–	0
Navy		–		–		4	–	7	–	0
Temple		–		–		4	–	7	–	0
Boston College		–		–		4	–	8	–	0
Memphis State		–		–		2	–	7	–	2
Rutgers		–		–		2	–	8	–	1
East Carolina		–		–		2	–	9	–	0
Louisville		–		–		2	–	9	–	0
Tulane		–		–		1	–	10	–	0
Rankings from AP Poll

The 1985 Florida State Seminoles football team represented Florida State University as an independent during the 1985 NCAA Division I-A football season. Led by tenth-year head coach Bobby Bowden, the Seminoles compiled a record of 9–3 with a win in the Gator Bowl over Oklahoma State. Florida State played home games at Doak Campbell Stadium in Tallahassee, Florida.

The Seminoles offense scored 402 points while the defense allowed 258 points.

== Schedule ==
Date	Time	Opponent	Rank	Site	TV	Result	Attendance	Source
August 31	12:30 p.m.	at Tulane	No. 19	Louisiana Superdome; New Orleans, LA	TBS	W 38–12	37,478	
September 7	3:00 p.m.	at No. 10 Nebraska	No. 17	Memorial Stadium; Lincoln, NE	ABC	W 17–13	75,943	
September 21	12:00 p.m.	Memphis State	No. 6	Doak Campbell Stadium; Tallahassee, FL	TBS	W 19–10	54,877	
September 28	7:00 p.m.	Kansas	No. 4	Doak Campbell Stadium; Tallahassee, FL		W 24–20	57,135	
October 12	12:30 p.m.	at No. 12 Auburn	No. 4	Jordan-Hare Stadium; Auburn, AL	TBS	L 27–59	75,000	
October 19	7:00 p.m.	Tulsa	No. 13	Doak Campbell Stadium; Tallahassee, FL		W 76–14	53,500	
October 26	1:00 p.m.	at North Carolina	No. 11	Kenan Memorial Stadium; Chapel Hill, NC		W 20–10	50,132	
November 2	3:30 p.m.	No. 11 Miami (FL)	No. 10	Doak Campbell Stadium; Tallahassee, FL (rivalry)	ABC	L 27–35	61,250	
November 9	7:45 p.m.	South Carolina	No. 16	Doak Campbell Stadium; Tallahassee, FL	ESPN	W 56–14	54,121	
November 16	7:00 p.m.	Western Carolina	No. 15	Doak Campbell Stadium; Tallahassee, FL		W 50–10	52,778	
November 30	12:30 p.m.	at No. 6 Florida	No. 12	Florida Field; Gainesville, FL (rivalry)		L 14–38	74,461	
December 30	8:00 p.m.	vs. No. 19 Oklahoma State	No. 18	Gator Bowl Stadium; Jacksonville, FL (Gator Bowl)	ABC	W 34–23	79,417	
Rankings from AP Poll released prior to the game

== Rankings ==
Ranking movements Legend: ██ Increase in ranking ██ Decrease in ranking ( ) = First-place votes
	Week																
Poll	Pre	1	2	3	4	5	6	7	8	9	10	11	12	13	14	15	Final
AP	19	17	7	6	4	4 (1)	4	13	11	10	16	16	14	12	18	18	15
Coaches	13 (1)	13 (1)	5 (1)	6 (1)	5	4 (1)	4	11	9	9	16	14	12	11	17	16	13

== Game summaries ==
=== at Nebraska ===
Team	1	2	3	4	Total
• No. 17 Seminoles	7	10	0	0	17
No. 10 Cornhuskers	7	6	0	0	13

- Date: September 7
- Location: Memorial Stadium, Lincoln, Nebraska
- Game attendance: 75,943
- Game weather: 93 °F (34 °C) (133 °F (56 °C) on the field)

=== Miami (FL) ===
#11 Miami (FL) at #10 Florida State

Team	1	2	3	4	Total
• No. 11 Hurricanes	14	0	7	14	35
No. 10 Seminoles	14	10	0	3	27

- Date: November 2
- Location: Doak Campbell Stadium, Tallahassee, Florida
- Game attendance: 61,250
- TV announcers (ABC): Tim Brant

Scoring summary
1	10:04	FSU	Hassan Jones 8-yard pass from Chip Ferguson (Schmidt kick)	FSU 7-0
1	7:23	Miami (FL)	Brian Blades 10-yard pass from Vinny Testaverde (Cox kick)	Tied 7-7
1	7:06	Miami (FL)	Blades 38-yard pass from Testaverde (Cox kick)	Miami (FL) 14-7
1	0:25	FSU	Brian Davis blocked punt recovery in end zone (Schmidt kick)	Tied 14-14
2	6:52	FSU	Derek Schmidt 37-yard field goal	FSU 17-14
2	2:39	FSU	Pat Carter 26-yard pass from Chip Ferguson (Schmidt kick)	FSU 24-14
3	8:15	Miami (FL)	2-yard fun (Cox kick)	FSU 24-21
4	11:07	FSU	Derek Schmidt 44-yard field goal	FSU 27-21
4	9:55	Miami (FL)	Michael Irvin 30-yard pass from Testaverde (Cox kick)	Miami (FL) 28-27
4	3:06	Miami (FL)	Brett Perriman 2-yard pass from Testaverde (Cox kick)	Miami (FL) 35-27

=== Vs. No. 19 Oklahoma State—Gator Bowl ===
#18 Florida State vs. #19 Oklahoma State

Team	1	2	3	4	Total
• No. 18 Seminoles	3	10	14	7	34
No. 19 Cowboys	0	0	17	6	23

- Date: December 30
- Location: Gator Bowl Stadium, Jacksonville, Florida
- Game attendance: 79,417
- Referee: Jim Kemerling (Big Ten)

== Roster ==
1985 Florida State Seminoles football team roster
Players
Coaches
Offense

Pos.	#	Name	Class
QB	5	Chip Ferguson	Fr
RB	27	Victor Floyd	Fr
FB	42	Cletis Jones	Sr
G	64	Jamie Dukes	Sr
OT	77	John Ionata	Sr
TE	85	Pat Carter	So
WR	88	Hassan Jones	Sr

Defense

Pos.	#	Name	Class
CB	32	Martin Mayhew	So
DT	45	Isaac Williams	Sr
LB	38	Paul McGowan	So
LB	57	Jesse Solomon	Sr
LB	84	Garth Jax	Sr
S	22	Kenny Kitchens	Fr

Special teams

Pos.	#	Name	Class
P	6	Louis Berry	Jr
K	18	Derek Schmidt	So

Head coach

- Bobby Bowden

Coordinators/assistant coaches

- Mickey Andrews – Defensive coordinator
- Wayne McDuffie – Offensive coordinator
- Chuck Amato – Defensive line
- Mark Richt – Graduate assistant

Legend

- (C) Team captain
- (S) Suspended
- (I) Ineligible
- Injured
- Redshirt

== Team players in the NFL ==
The following were selected in the 1986 NFL draft.

Player	Position	Round	Overall	NFL team
Hassan Jones	Wide receiver	5	120	Minnesota Vikings
John Ionata	Guard	9	242	Dallas Cowboys
Cletis Jones	Running back	10	276	New England Patriots
Garth Jax	Linebacker	11	296	Dallas Cowboys
Jesse Solomon	Linebacker	12	318	Minnesota Vikings
Isaac Williams	Defensive tackle	12	326	Indianapolis Colts
