= 1985 West Virginia Mountaineers football team =

American college football season

1985 West Virginia Mountaineers football
- Conference: Independent
- Record: 7–3–1
- Head coach: Don Nehlen (6th season)
- Home stadium: Mountaineer Field

1985 Major eastern college football independents records
	Conf.					Overall
Team	W		L		T	W		L		T
No. 3 Penn State $	6	–	0	–	0	11	–	1	–	0
West Virginia	4	–	1	–	1	7	–	3	–	1
Syracuse	4	–	2	–	0	7	–	5	–	0
Boston College	3	–	3	–	0	4	–	8	–	0
Pittsburgh	2	–	3	–	1	5	–	5	–	1
Temple	1	–	5	–	0	4	–	7	–	0
Rutgers	0	–	6	–	0	2	–	8	–	1
$ – Lambert Trophy Winner; Rankings from AP Poll

1985 NCAA Division I-A independents football records
	Conf.					Overall
Team	W		L		T	W		L		T
No. 3 Penn State		–		–		11	–	1	–	0
No. 9 Miami (FL)		–		–		10	–	2	–	0
Army		–		–		9	–	3	–	0
No. 15 Florida State		–		–		9	–	3	–	0
West Virginia		–		–		7	–	3	–	1
Southern Miss		–		–		7	–	4	–	0
Syracuse		–		–		7	–	5	–	0
Virginia Tech		–		–		6	–	5	–	0
Pittsburgh		–		–		5	–	5	–	1
Cincinnati		–		–		5	–	6	–	0
Notre Dame		–		–		5	–	6	–	0
South Carolina		–		–		5	–	6	–	0
Southwestern Louisiana		–		–		4	–	7	–	0
Navy		–		–		4	–	7	–	0
Temple		–		–		4	–	7	–	0
Boston College		–		–		4	–	8	–	0
Memphis State		–		–		2	–	7	–	2
Rutgers		–		–		2	–	8	–	1
East Carolina		–		–		2	–	9	–	0
Louisville		–		–		2	–	9	–	0
Tulane		–		–		1	–	10	–	0
Rankings from AP Poll

The 1985 West Virginia Mountaineers football team represented West Virginia University as an independent during the 1985 NCAA Division I-A football season. Led by sixth-year head coach Don Nehlen, the Mountaineers compiled a record of 7–3–1. West Virginia played home games at Mountaineer Field in Morgantown, West Virginia.

== Schedule ==
Date	Opponent	Site	Result	Attendance	Source
September 7	Louisville	Mountaineer Field; Morgantown, WV	W 52–13	62,128	
September 14	Duke	Mountaineer Field; Morgantown, WV	W 20–18	61,191	
September 21	at No. 17 Maryland	Byrd Stadium; College Park, MD (rivalry)	L 0–28	51,250	
September 28	Pittsburgh	Mountaineer Field; Morgantown, WV (Backyard Brawl)	T 10–10	62,453	
October 5	Virginia Tech	Mountaineer Field; Morgantown, WV (rivalry)	W 24–9	57,514	
October 19	at Boston College	Alumni Stadium; Chestnut Hill, MA	W 13–6	32,000	
October 26	at No. 3 Penn State	Beaver Stadium; University Park, PA (rivalry)	L 0–27	85,534	
November 2	at Virginia	Scott Stadium; Charlottesville, VA	L 7–27	35,000	
November 9	Rutgers	Mountaineer Field; Morgantown, WV	W 27–0	48,373	
November 16	Temple	Mountaineer Field; Morgantown, WV	W 23–10	34,721	
November 30	at Syracuse	Carrier Dome; Syracuse, NY (rivalry)	W 13–10	33,431	
Rankings from AP Poll released prior to the game

== Roster ==
1985 West Virginia Mountaineers football team roster
Players
Coaches
Offense

Pos.	#	Name	Class
WR	1	Grantis Bell	Fr
RB	3	John Holifield	Sr
WR	7	John Talley	So
QB	17	Mike Timko	So
FB	20	Craig Taylor	Fr
G	75	John Stroia	Fr
OT	77	Brian Jozwiak	Sr
OT	79	Brian Smider	Fr
TE	81	Keith Winn	Fr
WR	82	Calvin Phillips	Fr
TE	83	Gary Basil	So
WR	87	Brian Krawchyk	Sr

Defense

Pos.	#	Name	Class
DB	22	Bo Orlando	Fr
LB	30	Fred Smalls	Sr
DT	98	David Grant	So
DT	99	Jeff Lucas	Jr

Special teams

Pos.	#	Name	Class
K	8	Charlie Baumann	Fr
P	11	Steve Superick	Sr

Head coach

- Don Nehlen

Coordinators/assistant coaches

Legend

- (C) Team captain
- (S) Suspended
- (I) Ineligible
- Injured
- Redshirt
