= 1985 Tulane Green Wave football team =

American college football season

1985 Tulane Green Wave football
- Conference: Independent
- Record: 1–10
- Head coach: Mack Brown (1st season)
- Offensive coordinator: Darrell Moody (1st season)
- Home stadium: Louisiana Superdome

1985 NCAA Division I-A independents football records
	Conf.					Overall
Team	W		L		T	W		L		T
No. 3 Penn State		–		–		11	–	1	–	0
No. 9 Miami (FL)		–		–		10	–	2	–	0
Army		–		–		9	–	3	–	0
No. 15 Florida State		–		–		9	–	3	–	0
West Virginia		–		–		7	–	3	–	1
Southern Miss		–		–		7	–	4	–	0
Syracuse		–		–		7	–	5	–	0
Virginia Tech		–		–		6	–	5	–	0
Pittsburgh		–		–		5	–	5	–	1
Cincinnati		–		–		5	–	6	–	0
Notre Dame		–		–		5	–	6	–	0
South Carolina		–		–		5	–	6	–	0
Southwestern Louisiana		–		–		4	–	7	–	0
Navy		–		–		4	–	7	–	0
Temple		–		–		4	–	7	–	0
Boston College		–		–		4	–	8	–	0
Memphis State		–		–		2	–	7	–	2
Rutgers		–		–		2	–	8	–	1
East Carolina		–		–		2	–	9	–	0
Louisville		–		–		2	–	9	–	0
Tulane		–		–		1	–	10	–	0
Rankings from AP Poll

The 1985 Tulane Green Wave football team was an American football team that represented Tulane University during the 1985 NCAA Division I-A football season as an independent. In their first year under head coach Mack Brown, the team compiled a 1–10 record.

== Schedule ==
Date	Opponent	Site	TV	Result	Attendance	Source
August 31	No. 19 Florida State	Louisiana Superdome; New Orleans, LA		L 12–38	37,478	
September 14	at TCU	Amon G. Carter Stadium; Fort Worth, TX		L 13–30	31,512	
September 21	at Kentucky	Commonwealth Stadium; Lexington, KY		L 11–16	55,812	
September 28	Ole Miss	Louisiana Superdome; New Orleans, LA (rivalry)		L 10–27	32,578	
October 5	Vanderbilt	Louisiana Superdome; New Orleans, LA		L 17–24	25,979	
October 12	at Memphis State	Liberty Bowl Memorial Stadium; Memphis, TN		L 21–38	31,298	
October 19	at Mississippi State	Scott Field; Starkville, MS		L 27–31	30,420	
November 2	at No. 18 Georgia	Sanford Stadium; Athens, GA		L 3–58	81,407	
November 9	Southwestern Louisiana	Louisiana Superdome; New Orleans, LA		W 27–17	24,040	
November 23	at Southern Miss	M. M. Roberts Stadium; Hattiesburg, MS (rivalry)		L 6–24	21,753	
November 30	No. 13 LSU	Louisiana Superdome; New Orleans, LA (Battle for the Rag)	TigerVision	L 19–31	64,194	
Rankings from AP Poll released prior to the game
