= 1985 Rutgers Scarlet Knights football team =

American college football season

1985 Rutgers Scarlet Knights football
- Conference: Independent
- Record: 2–8–1
- Head coach: Dick Anderson (2nd season)
- Offensive coordinator: Dick Curl (3rd season)
- Defensive coordinator: Otto Kneidinger (2nd season)
- Home stadium: Rutgers Stadium; Giants Stadium

1985 Major eastern college football independents records
	Conf.					Overall
Team	W		L		T	W		L		T
No. 3 Penn State $	6	–	0	–	0	11	–	1	–	0
West Virginia	4	–	1	–	1	7	–	3	–	1
Syracuse	4	–	2	–	0	7	–	5	–	0
Boston College	3	–	3	–	0	4	–	8	–	0
Pittsburgh	2	–	3	–	1	5	–	5	–	1
Temple	1	–	5	–	0	4	–	7	–	0
Rutgers	0	–	6	–	0	2	–	8	–	1
$ – Lambert Trophy Winner; Rankings from AP Poll

1985 NCAA Division I-A independents football records
	Conf.					Overall
Team	W		L		T	W		L		T
No. 3 Penn State		–		–		11	–	1	–	0
No. 9 Miami (FL)		–		–		10	–	2	–	0
Army		–		–		9	–	3	–	0
No. 15 Florida State		–		–		9	–	3	–	0
West Virginia		–		–		7	–	3	–	1
Southern Miss		–		–		7	–	4	–	0
Syracuse		–		–		7	–	5	–	0
Virginia Tech		–		–		6	–	5	–	0
Pittsburgh		–		–		5	–	5	–	1
Cincinnati		–		–		5	–	6	–	0
Notre Dame		–		–		5	–	6	–	0
South Carolina		–		–		5	–	6	–	0
Southwestern Louisiana		–		–		4	–	7	–	0
Navy		–		–		4	–	7	–	0
Temple		–		–		4	–	7	–	0
Boston College		–		–		4	–	8	–	0
Memphis State		–		–		2	–	7	–	2
Rutgers		–		–		2	–	8	–	1
East Carolina		–		–		2	–	9	–	0
Louisville		–		–		2	–	9	–	0
Tulane		–		–		1	–	10	–	0
Rankings from AP Poll

The 1985 Rutgers Scarlet Knights football team represented Rutgers University as an independent during the 1985 NCAA Division I-A football season. In their second season under head coach Dick Anderson, the Scarlet Knights compiled a 2–8–1 record while competing as an independent and were outscored by their opponents 266 to 149. The team's statistical leaders included Joe Gagliardi with 1,273 passing yards, Albert Smith with 362 rushing yards and 244 receiving yards.

== Schedule ==
Date	Opponent	Site	Result	Attendance	Source
September 14	at No. 3 Florida	Florida Field; Gainesville, FL	T 28–28	71,708	
September 21	at Army	Michie Stadium; West Point, NY	L 16–20	39,732	
September 28	No. 9 Penn State	Giants Stadium; East Rutherford, NJ	L 10–17	54,560	
October 5	Boston College	Giants Stadium; East Rutherford, NJ	L 10–20	17,456	
October 12	at Temple	Veterans Stadium; Philadelphia, PA	L 13–14	25,286	
October 19	Pittsburgh	Giants Stadium; East Rutherford, NJ	L 10–38	18,991	
October 26	No. 1 (I-AA) Richmond	Rutgers Stadium; Piscataway, NJ	W 20–17	26,552	
November 2	at No. 19 Tennessee	Neyland Stadium; Knoxville, TN	L 0–40	92,188	
November 9	at West Virginia	Mountaineer Field; Morgantown, WV	L 0–27	48,373	
November 16	Colgate	Rutgers Stadium; Piscataway, NJ	W 28–14	6,500	
November 23	Syracuse	Rutgers Stadium; Piscataway, NJ	L 14–31	19,685	
Rankings from AP Poll released prior to the game
