= 1985 Penn State Nittany Lions football team =

American college football season

1985 Penn State Nittany Lions football

Eastern champion

Orange Bowl, L 10–25 vs. Oklahoma
- Conference: Independent

Ranking
- Coaches: No. 3
- AP: No. 3
- Record: 11–1
- Head coach: Joe Paterno (20th season)
- Offensive coordinator: Fran Ganter (2nd season)
- Offensive scheme: Pro-style
- Defensive coordinator: Jerry Sandusky (9th season)
- Base defense: 4–3
- Captains: Rogers Alexander; Todd Moules; Mike Zordich
- Home stadium: Beaver Stadium

1985 Major eastern college football independents records
| | Conf. | | | | | Overall |
| Team | W | | L | | T | W | | L | | T |
|---|---|---|---|---|---|---|---|---|---|---|
| No. 3 Penn State $ | 6 | – | 0 | – | 0 | 11 | – | 1 | – | 0 |
| West Virginia | 4 | – | 1 | – | 1 | 7 | – | 3 | – | 1 |
| Syracuse | 4 | – | 2 | – | 0 | 7 | – | 5 | – | 0 |
| Boston College | 3 | – | 3 | – | 0 | 4 | – | 8 | – | 0 |
| Pittsburgh | 2 | – | 3 | – | 1 | 5 | – | 5 | – | 1 |
| Temple | 1 | – | 5 | – | 0 | 4 | – | 7 | – | 0 |
| Rutgers | 0 | – | 6 | – | 0 | 2 | – | 8 | – | 1 |
$ – Lambert Trophy Winner; Rankings from AP Poll

1985 NCAA Division I-A independents football records
| | Conf. | | | | | Overall |
| Team | W | | L | | T | W | | L | | T |
|---|---|---|---|---|---|---|---|---|---|---|
| No. 3 Penn State | | – | | – | | 11 | – | 1 | – | 0 |
| No. 9 Miami (FL) | | – | | – | | 10 | – | 2 | – | 0 |
| Army | | – | | – | | 9 | – | 3 | – | 0 |
| No. 15 Florida State | | – | | – | | 9 | – | 3 | – | 0 |
| West Virginia | | – | | – | | 7 | – | 3 | – | 1 |
| Southern Miss | | – | | – | | 7 | – | 4 | – | 0 |
| Syracuse | | – | | – | | 7 | – | 5 | – | 0 |
| Virginia Tech | | – | | – | | 6 | – | 5 | – | 0 |
| Pittsburgh | | – | | – | | 5 | – | 5 | – | 1 |
| Cincinnati | | – | | – | | 5 | – | 6 | – | 0 |
| Notre Dame | | – | | – | | 5 | – | 6 | – | 0 |
| South Carolina | | – | | – | | 5 | – | 6 | – | 0 |
| Southwestern Louisiana | | – | | – | | 4 | – | 7 | – | 0 |
| Navy | | – | | – | | 4 | – | 7 | – | 0 |
| Temple | | – | | – | | 4 | – | 7 | – | 0 |
| Boston College | | – | | – | | 4 | – | 8 | – | 0 |
| Memphis State | | – | | – | | 2 | – | 7 | – | 2 |
| Rutgers | | – | | – | | 2 | – | 8 | – | 1 |
| East Carolina | | – | | – | | 2 | – | 9 | – | 0 |
| Louisville | | – | | – | | 2 | – | 9 | – | 0 |
| Tulane | | – | | – | | 1 | – | 10 | – | 0 |
Rankings from AP Poll

The 1985 Penn State Nittany Lions football team represented the Pennsylvania State University as an independent during the 1985 NCAA Division I-A football season. Led by 20th-year head coach Joe Paterno, the Nittany Lions compiled a record of 11–1. Penn State was invited to the Orange Bowl, where the Nittany Lions lost to Oklahoma. The team played home games at Beaver Stadium in University Park, Pennsylvania.

== Schedule ==
| Date | Time | Opponent | Rank | Site | TV | Result | Attendance | Source |
|---|---|---|---|---|---|---|---|---|
| September 7 | 12:20 p.m. | at No. 7 Maryland | No. 19 | Byrd Stadium; College Park, MD (rivalry) | USA | W 20–18 | 50,750 | |
| September 14 | 12:20 p.m. | Temple | No. 11 | Beaver Stadium; University Park, PA | TCS | W 27–25 | 84,651 | |
| September 21 | 1:30 p.m. | East Carolina | No. 10 | Beaver Stadium; University Park, PA | | W 17–10 | 84,266 | |
| September 28 | 1:00 p.m. | at Rutgers | No. 9 | Giants Stadium; East Rutherford, NJ | | W 17–10 | 54,560 | |
| October 12 | 3:30 p.m. | No. 10 Alabama | No. 8 | Beaver Stadium; University Park, PA (rivalry) | ABC | W 19–17 | 85,444 | |
| October 19 | 1:30 p.m. | at Syracuse | No. 6 | Carrier Dome; Syracuse, NY (rivalry) | | W 24–20 | 50,021 | |
| October 26 | 3:30 p.m. | West Virginia^{†} | No. 3 | Beaver Stadium; University Park, PA (rivalry) | ABC | W 27–0 | 85,534 | |
| November 2 | 12:30 p.m. | Boston College | No. 3 | Beaver Stadium; University Park, PA | | W 16–12 | 82,000 | |
| November 9 | 2:00 p.m. | at Cincinnati | No. 2 | Riverfront Stadium; Cincinnati, OH | | W 31–10 | 33,528 | |
| November 16 | 3:30 p.m. | Notre Dame | No. 1 | Beaver Stadium; University Park, PA (rivalry) | ABC | W 36–6 | 84,000 | |
| November 23 | 7:45 p.m. | at Pittsburgh | No. 1 | Pitt Stadium; Pittsburgh, PA (rivalry) | ESPN | W 31–0 | 60,134 | |
| January 1, 1986 | 8:00 p.m. | vs. No. 3 Oklahoma | No. 1 | Miami Orange Bowl; Miami, FL (Orange Bowl) | NBC | L 10–25 | 74,148 | |
^{†}Homecoming; Rankings from AP Poll released prior to the game; All times are in Eastern time

== Rankings ==
Ranking movements Legend: ██ Increase in ranking ██ Decrease in ranking ( ) = First-place votes
| | Week | | | | | | | | | | | | | | | | |
| Poll | Pre | 1 | 2 | 3 | 4 | 5 | 6 | 7 | 8 | 9 | 10 | 11 | 12 | 13 | 14 | 15 | Final |
|---|---|---|---|---|---|---|---|---|---|---|---|---|---|---|---|---|---|
| AP | 18 | 19 | 11 | 10 | 9 | 9 | 8 | 6 | 3 | 3 | 2 (15) | 1 (44) | 1 (46) | 1 (49) | 1 (47) | 1 (47) | 3 |
| Coaches | 17 | 17 | 9 | 8 | 6 | 7 | 6 | 4 | 2 | 2 | 1 (34) | 1 (34) | 1 (41) | 1 (39) | 1 (37) | 1 (36) | 3 |

== Game summaries ==
=== At Maryland ===
Penn State at Maryland

| Team | 1 | 2 | 3 | 4 | Total |
|---|---|---|---|---|---|
| • No. 19 Nittany Lions | 10 | 7 | 3 | 0 | 20 |
| No. 7 Terrapins | 0 | 10 | 8 | 0 | 18 |

- Date: September 7
- Location: Byrd Stadium, College Park, MD
- Game attendance: 50,750
- TV announcers (TCS): George Paterno and Stan Savran

Scoring summary
| Q1 | | PSU | Zordich 32 yard interception return (Manca kick) | PSU 7–0 |
| Q1 | | PSU | Manca 28 yard field goal | PSU 10–0 |
| Q2 | | PSU | Williams 2 yard pass from Shaffer (Manca kick) | PSU 17–0 |
| Q2 | | MD | Paredes 22 yard field goal | PSU 17–3 |
| Q2 | | MD | Badanjek 8 yard run (Paredes kick) | PSU 17–10 |
| Q3 | | MD | Badanjek 5 yard run (Knight pass from Henning) | MD 18–17 |
| Q3 | 9:46 | PSU | Manca 46 yard field goal | PSU 20–18 |

=== Vs. Oklahoma (Orange Bowl) ===
Penn State vs. Oklahoma

| Team | 1 | 2 | 3 | 4 | Total |
|---|---|---|---|---|---|
| No. 1 Nittany Lions | 7 | 3 | 0 | 0 | 10 |
| • No. 3 Sooners | 0 | 16 | 3 | 6 | 25 |

- Date: January 1, 1986
- Location: Orange Bowl
- Game attendance: 74,178
- TV announcers (NBC): Don Criqui (play-by-play), Bob Trumpy (analyst), Bob Griese (sideline), and Jimmy Cefalo (sideline)

Scoring summary
| 1 | 8:17 | PSU | Tim Manoa 1-yard run (Massimo Manca kick) | PSU 7-0 |
| 2 | 14:35 | OU | Tim Lashar 26-yard field goal | PSU 7-3 |
| 2 | 12:26 | OU | Keith Jackson 71-yard pass from Jamelle Holieway (Tim Lashar kick) | OU 10-7 |
| 2 | 5:20 | OU | Tim Lashar 31-yard field goal | OU 13-7 |
| 2 | 1:49 | OU | Tim Lashar 21-yard field goal | OU 16-7 |
| 2 | 0:01 | PSU | Massimo Manca 27-yard field goal | OU 16-10 |
| 3 | 3:09 | OU | Tim Lashar 22-yard field goal | OU 19-10 |
| 4 | 1:42 | OU | Lydell Carr 61-yard run (Lashar kick failed) | OU 25-10 |

== Roster ==
1985 Penn State Nittany Lions football team roster
Players
Coaches
Offense

| Pos. | # | Name | Class |
|---|---|---|---|
| WR | 9 | Mike Alexander | Jr |
| OT | 74 | Stan Clayton | So |
| G | 57 | Chris Conlin | Jr |
| RB | 42 | D.J. Dozier | So |
| G | 54 | Mitch Frerotte | Jr |
| FB | 27 | John Hornyak | Jr |
| FB | 44 | Tim Manoa | Jr |
| G | 59 | Dan Morgan | Jr |
| C | 56 | Keith Radecic | Jr |
| WR | 6 | Ray Roundtree | So |
| QB | 14 | John Shaffer | Jr |
| RB | 35 | Steve Smith | Jr |
| RB | 32 | Blair Thomas | Fr |
| WR | 5 | Michael Timpson | Fr |
| G | 66 | Steve Wisniewski | Fr |

Defense

| Pos. | # | Name | Class |
|---|---|---|---|
| LB | 95 | Rogers Alexander | Sr |
| LB | 31 | Shane Conlan | Jr |
| LB | 53 | Don Graham | Jr |
| S | 22 | Ray Isom | Jr |
| LB | 55 | Tim Johnson | Jr |
| DB | 43 | Mike Zordich | Sr |

Special teams

| Pos. | # | Name | Class |
|---|---|---|---|
| PK | 10 | Massimo Manca | Jr |

Head coach

- Joe Paterno

Coordinators/assistant coaches

- Tom Bradley
- Ron Dickerson
- Fran Ganter
- Nick Gasparato
- Bob Phillips
- Frank Rocco
- Joe Sarra
- Jerry Sandusky
- Jim Williams

Legend

- (C) Team captain
- (S) Suspended
- (I) Ineligible
- Injured
- Redshirt

== NFL draft ==
Three Nittany Lions were drafted in the 1986 NFL draft.

| Round | Pick | Overall | Name | Position | Team |
|---|---|---|---|---|---|
| 4th | 23 | 105 | Rogers Alexander | Linebacker | New York Jets |
| 7th | 2 | 168 | Bob Williams | Tight end | Buffalo Bills |
| 9th | 14 | 235 | Mike Zordich | Defensive back | San Diego Chargers |
