= 1985 Navy Midshipmen football team =

American college football season

1985 Navy Midshipmen football
- Conference: Independent
- Record: 4–7
- Head coach: Gary Tranquill (4th season)
- Captains: Eric Fudge; Napoleon McCallum
- Home stadium: Navy–Marine Corps Memorial Stadium

1985 NCAA Division I-A independents football records
	Conf.					Overall
Team	W		L		T	W		L		T
No. 3 Penn State		–		–		11	–	1	–	0
No. 9 Miami (FL)		–		–		10	–	2	–	0
Army		–		–		9	–	3	–	0
No. 15 Florida State		–		–		9	–	3	–	0
West Virginia		–		–		7	–	3	–	1
Southern Miss		–		–		7	–	4	–	0
Syracuse		–		–		7	–	5	–	0
Virginia Tech		–		–		6	–	5	–	0
Pittsburgh		–		–		5	–	5	–	1
Cincinnati		–		–		5	–	6	–	0
Notre Dame		–		–		5	–	6	–	0
South Carolina		–		–		5	–	6	–	0
Southwestern Louisiana		–		–		4	–	7	–	0
Navy		–		–		4	–	7	–	0
Temple		–		–		4	–	7	–	0
Boston College		–		–		4	–	8	–	0
Memphis State		–		–		2	–	7	–	2
Rutgers		–		–		2	–	8	–	1
East Carolina		–		–		2	–	9	–	0
Louisville		–		–		2	–	9	–	0
Tulane		–		–		1	–	10	–	0
Rankings from AP Poll

The 1985 Navy Midshipmen football team represented the United States Naval Academy as an independent during the 1985 NCAA Division I-A football season.

== Schedule ==
Date	Opponent	Site	TV	Result	Attendance	Source
September 7	North Carolina	Navy–Marine Corps Memorial Stadium; Annapolis, MD		L 19–21	26,394	
September 14	at Delaware	Delaware Stadium; Newark, DE		L 13–16	23,110	
September 21	at Indiana	Memorial Stadium; Bloomington, IN		L 35–38	35,610	
September 28	at No. 20 Virginia	Scott Stadium; Charlottesville, VA		W 17–13	44,000	
October 12	No. 13 Air Force	Navy–Marine Corps Memorial Stadium; Annapolis, MD (Commander-in-Chief's Trophy)		L 7–24	35,663	
October 19	Lafayette^{†}	Navy–Marine Corps Memorial Stadium; Annapolis, MD		W 56–14	28,402	
October 26	Pittsburgh	Navy–Marine Corps Memorial Stadium; Annapolis, MD		W 21–7	29,343	
November 2	at Notre Dame	Notre Dame Stadium; Notre Dame, IN (rivalry)	ABC	L 17–41	59,075	
November 9	Syracuse	Navy–Marine Corps Memorial Stadium; Annapolis, MD		L 20–24	25,049	
November 16	at South Carolina	Williams–Brice Stadium; Columbia, SC		L 31–34	69,542	
December 7	vs. Army	Veterans Stadium; Philadelphia, PA (Army–Navy Game)	CBS	W 17–7	71,640	
^{†}Homecoming; Rankings from AP Poll released prior to the game

== Game summaries ==
=== vs Army ===
Army Cadets (8–2) vs. Navy Midshipmen (3–7)

Quarter	1	2	3	4	Total
Navy	7	0	0	10	17
Army	7	0	0	0	7

at Veterans Stadium, Philadelphia, Pennsylvania

- Date: December 7, 1985
- Game time: 2:30 p.m. EDT
- Game attendance: 71,640
- TV announcers (CBS): Brent Musburger and Ara Parseghian

Game information

First quarter

- NAVY – Troy Saunders 13-yard pass from Bob Misch (Todd Solomon kick), 6:54. Navy 7–0. Drive: 16 plays, 73 yards.
- ARMY – Clarence Jones 10-yard run (kick good). Tie 7–7.

Second quarter

- No scoring

Third quarter

- No scoring

Fourth quarter

- NAVY – Chuck Smith 5-yard run (Todd Solomon kick), 8:26. Navy 14–7.
- NAVY – Todd Solomon 26-yard field goal, 1:15. Navy 17–7.

Top rushers

- NAVY – Napoleon McCallum – 41 rushes, 217 yards

With Vice President and former Navy pilot George Bush in attendance, Napoleon McCallum rushed for 217 yards, the second-most rushing yards by a Navy player against Army, and broke the NCAA single-season all-purpose yardage record of Pitt's Tony Dorsett.

External videos
- 1985 Army vs. Navy – Television broadcast

== Roster ==
1985 Navy Midshipmen football team roster
Players
Coaches
Offense

Pos.	#	Name	Class
RB		John Berner
OL		Frank Bijak
QB		Bill Byrne	Jr
OL		Chris Castelli
OL		Pat Hoffman
WR		Anthony Hollinger
TE		Kenneth Kmiec
WR		John Lobb
RB		Napoleon McCallum (C)	RSr
RB		John McKenna
OL		Mark Miller
QB		Bob Misch
WR		Mike Ray
WR		Troy Saunders
TE		Gregory Schildmeyer
RB		Chuck Smith
RB		Mike Smith
TE		John Sniffen
OL		Vic Tuttle

Defense

Pos.	#	Name	Class
DB		Steve Brady
DB		John Carroll
LB		Tom Doman
LB		Jim Dwyer
DB		Marc Firlie
DL		Eric Fudge (C)	Sr
DL		Dirk MacFarlane
LB		Vince McBeth
DB		Tom Metzger
DB		Mike Milo
DL		Mike Musser
DL		Dave Pimpo
DL		Bob Plantz
DL		Kent Van Horn
DL		Chad Van Hulzen

Special teams

Pos.	#	Name	Class
P		Andy Mueck
P		Scott Quinlan
K		Todd Solomon

Head coach

- Gary Tranquill

Coordinators/assistant coaches

Legend

- (C) Team captain
- (S) Suspended
- (I) Ineligible
- Injured
- Redshirt

== Awards ==
- Napoleon McCallum – Heisman Trophy voting (7th)
