= 1985 South Carolina Gamecocks football team =

American college football season

1985 South Carolina Gamecocks football
- Conference: Independent
- Record: 5–6
- Head coach: Joe Morrison (3rd season)
- Defensive coordinator: Tom Gadd (3rd season)
- Home stadium: Williams–Brice Stadium

1985 NCAA Division I-A independents football records
	Conf.					Overall
Team	W		L		T	W		L		T
No. 3 Penn State		–		–		11	–	1	–	0
No. 9 Miami (FL)		–		–		10	–	2	–	0
Army		–		–		9	–	3	–	0
No. 15 Florida State		–		–		9	–	3	–	0
West Virginia		–		–		7	–	3	–	1
Southern Miss		–		–		7	–	4	–	0
Syracuse		–		–		7	–	5	–	0
Virginia Tech		–		–		6	–	5	–	0
Pittsburgh		–		–		5	–	5	–	1
Cincinnati		–		–		5	–	6	–	0
Notre Dame		–		–		5	–	6	–	0
South Carolina		–		–		5	–	6	–	0
Southwestern Louisiana		–		–		4	–	7	–	0
Navy		–		–		4	–	7	–	0
Temple		–		–		4	–	7	–	0
Boston College		–		–		4	–	8	–	0
Memphis State		–		–		2	–	7	–	2
Rutgers		–		–		2	–	8	–	1
East Carolina		–		–		2	–	9	–	0
Louisville		–		–		2	–	9	–	0
Tulane		–		–		1	–	10	–	0
Rankings from AP Poll

The 1985 South Carolina Gamecocks football team represented the University of South Carolina as an independent during the 1985 NCAA Division I-A football season. The team played its home games at Williams–Brice Stadium. Led by third-year head coach Joe Morrison, the Gamecocks compiled a record of 5–6.

South Carolina could not match the success of their national title-contending 1984 season. The Gamecocks started the season 2–0 and ranked No. 15, with the third highest-ranked offense in the country. Their first game, against The Citadel, even broke the school record for yards in a game, with 636 yards. However, the rout at home by No. 19 Michigan, led by quarterback Jim Harbaugh, would be the first of three consecutive losses and six total losses in the season. South Carolina finished with their fourth non-winning season in five years.

== Schedule ==
Date	Opponent	Rank	Site	TV	Result	Attendance	Source
August 31	The Citadel	No. 17	Williams–Brice Stadium; Columbia, SC		W 56–17	73,500	
September 7	Appalachian State	No. 18	Williams–Brice Stadium; Columbia, SC		W 20–13	73,100	
September 21	No. 19 Michigan	No. 15	Williams–Brice Stadium; Columbia, SC	ABC	L 3–34	74,200	
September 28	at Georgia		Sanford Stadium; Athens, GA (rivalry)		L 21–35	82,122	
October 5	at Pittsburgh		Pitt Stadium; Pittsburgh, PA		L 7–42	32,277	
October 12	Duke		Williams–Brice Stadium; Columbia, SC		W 28–7	71,150	
October 19	at East Carolina		Ficklen Memorial Stadium; Greenville, NC		W 52–10	35,047	
November 2	NC State		Williams–Brice Stadium; Columbia, SC		L 17–21	69,100	
November 9	at No. 16 Florida State		Doak Campbell Stadium; Tallahassee, FL	ESPN	L 14–56	54,121	
November 16	Navy		Williams–Brice Stadium; Columbia, SC		W 34–31	69,542	
November 23	Clemson		Williams–Brice Stadium; Columbia, SC (rivalry)		L 17–24	75,026	
Rankings from Coaches' Poll released prior to the game

== Roster ==
1985 South Carolina Gamecocks football team roster
Players
Coaches
Offense

Pos.	#	Name	Class
WR	1	Ryan Bethea	So
C	50	Leonard Burton	Sr
QB	9	Todd Ellis	Fr
OT	78	Mark Fryer	Fr
RB	32	Kent Hagood	Sr
WR	4	Robert Hill	Fr
QB	7	Mike Hold	Sr
C	57	Woody Meyers	So
WR	2	Sterling Sharpe	So
G	71	Paul Shivers	Fr
TE	41	Danny Smith	So

Defense

Pos.	#	Name	Class
S	23	Joe Brooks	Jr
DT	54	Todd Cooper	So
DB	27	Brad Edwards	So
LB	45	Willie Hill	So
CB	13	Chris Major	Jr
DT	95	Brendan McCormack	So
LB	48	Matt McKernan	Fr
LB	46	Ron Monaco	Sr

Special teams

Pos.	#	Name	Class
K	16	Scott Hagler	Jr
P	8	Tom O'Connor	Sr

Head coach

- Joe Morrison

Coordinators/assistant coaches

Legend

- (C) Team captain
- (S) Suspended
- (I) Ineligible
- Injured
- Redshirt
