= 1985 Temple Owls football team =

American college football season

1985 Temple Owls football
- Conference: Independent
- Record: 4–7
- Head coach: Bruce Arians (3rd season)
- Defensive coordinator: Nick Rapone (1st season)
- Home stadium: Veterans Stadium

1985 Major eastern college football independents records
	Conf.					Overall
Team	W		L		T	W		L		T
No. 3 Penn State $	6	–	0	–	0	11	–	1	–	0
West Virginia	4	–	1	–	1	7	–	3	–	1
Syracuse	4	–	2	–	0	7	–	5	–	0
Boston College	3	–	3	–	0	4	–	8	–	0
Pittsburgh	2	–	3	–	1	5	–	5	–	1
Temple	1	–	5	–	0	4	–	7	–	0
Rutgers	0	–	6	–	0	2	–	8	–	1
$ – Lambert Trophy Winner; Rankings from AP Poll

1985 NCAA Division I-A independents football records
	Conf.					Overall
Team	W		L		T	W		L		T
No. 3 Penn State		–		–		11	–	1	–	0
No. 9 Miami (FL)		–		–		10	–	2	–	0
Army		–		–		9	–	3	–	0
No. 15 Florida State		–		–		9	–	3	–	0
West Virginia		–		–		7	–	3	–	1
Southern Miss		–		–		7	–	4	–	0
Syracuse		–		–		7	–	5	–	0
Virginia Tech		–		–		6	–	5	–	0
Pittsburgh		–		–		5	–	5	–	1
Cincinnati		–		–		5	–	6	–	0
Notre Dame		–		–		5	–	6	–	0
South Carolina		–		–		5	–	6	–	0
Southwestern Louisiana		–		–		4	–	7	–	0
Navy		–		–		4	–	7	–	0
Temple		–		–		4	–	7	–	0
Boston College		–		–		4	–	8	–	0
Memphis State		–		–		2	–	7	–	2
Rutgers		–		–		2	–	8	–	1
East Carolina		–		–		2	–	9	–	0
Louisville		–		–		2	–	9	–	0
Tulane		–		–		1	–	10	–	0
Rankings from AP Poll

The 1985 Temple Owls football team was an American football team that represented Temple University as an independent during the 1985 NCAA Division I-A football season. In its third season under head coach Bruce Arians, the team compiled a 4–7 record and outscored opponents by a total of 233 to 223. The team played its home games at Veterans Stadium in Philadelphia.

The team's statistical leaders included Lee Saltz with 1,875 passing yards, Paul Palmer with 1,516 rushing yards and 60 points scored, and Willie Marshall with 893 receiving yards.

== Schedule ==
Date	Opponent	Site	Result	Attendance	Source
September 7	at Boston College	Alumni Stadium; Chestnut Hill, MA	L 25–28	31,500	
September 14	at No. 11 Penn State	Beaver Stadium; University Park, PA	L 25–27	84,651	
September 21	No. 13 BYU	Veterans Stadium; Philadelphia, PA	L 24–26	31,085	
September 28	at East Carolina	Ficklen Memorial Stadium; Greenville, NC	W 21–7	32,087	
October 5	at Cincinnati	Riverfront Stadium; Cincinnati, OH	W 28–16	12,103	
October 12	Rutgers	Veterans Stadium; Philadelphia, PA	W 14–13	25,286	
October 19	No. 12 (I-AA) William & Mary	Veterans Stadium; Philadelphia, PA	W 45–16	15,186	
October 26	at Syracuse	Carrier Dome; Syracuse, NY	L 14–29	45,391	
November 2	at Delaware	Delaware Stadium; Newark, DE	L 10–17	19,614	
November 9	Pittsburgh	Veterans Stadium; Philadelphia, PA	L 17–21	19,428	
November 16	at West Virginia	Mountaineer Field; Morgantown, WV	L 10–23	34,721	
Rankings from AP Poll released prior to the game

== Roster ==
1985 Temple Owls football team roster
Players
Coaches
Offense

Pos.	#	Name	Class
OT	65	Eric Coss	Sr
WR	40	Andy Garczynski	So
TE	86	Mike Hinnant	So
WR	84	Willie Marshall	Jr
RB	42	Matt McHugh	Sr
RB	34	Todd McNair	Fr
RB	6	Paul Palmer	Jr
G	70	John Rienstra	Sr
QB	11	Lee Saltz	Jr

Defense

Pos.	#	Name	Class
DB	15	Todd Bowles	Sr
LB	54	Steve Domonoski	Jr
DE	98	Ralph Jarvis	So
DB	27	Terry Wright	Jr

Special teams

Pos.	#	Name	Class

Head coach

- Bruce Arians

Coordinators/assistant coaches

Legend

- (C) Team captain
- (S) Suspended
- (I) Ineligible
- Injured
- Redshirt
