= 1985 Syracuse Orangemen football team =

American college football season

1985 Syracuse Orangemen football

Cherry Bowl, L 18–35 vs. Maryland
- Conference: Independent
- Record: 7–5
- Head coach: Dick MacPherson (5th season)
- Captains: Tim Green; Rudy Reed
- Home stadium: Carrier Dome

1985 Major eastern college football independents records
	Conf.					Overall
Team	W		L		T	W		L		T
No. 3 Penn State $	6	–	0	–	0	11	–	1	–	0
West Virginia	4	–	1	–	1	7	–	3	–	1
Syracuse	4	–	2	–	0	7	–	5	–	0
Boston College	3	–	3	–	0	4	–	8	–	0
Pittsburgh	2	–	3	–	1	5	–	5	–	1
Temple	1	–	5	–	0	4	–	7	–	0
Rutgers	0	–	6	–	0	2	–	8	–	1
$ – Lambert Trophy Winner; Rankings from AP Poll

1985 NCAA Division I-A independents football records
	Conf.					Overall
Team	W		L		T	W		L		T
No. 3 Penn State		–		–		11	–	1	–	0
No. 9 Miami (FL)		–		–		10	–	2	–	0
Army		–		–		9	–	3	–	0
No. 15 Florida State		–		–		9	–	3	–	0
West Virginia		–		–		7	–	3	–	1
Southern Miss		–		–		7	–	4	–	0
Syracuse		–		–		7	–	5	–	0
Virginia Tech		–		–		6	–	5	–	0
Pittsburgh		–		–		5	–	5	–	1
Cincinnati		–		–		5	–	6	–	0
Notre Dame		–		–		5	–	6	–	0
South Carolina		–		–		5	–	6	–	0
Southwestern Louisiana		–		–		4	–	7	–	0
Navy		–		–		4	–	7	–	0
Temple		–		–		4	–	7	–	0
Boston College		–		–		4	–	8	–	0
Memphis State		–		–		2	–	7	–	2
Rutgers		–		–		2	–	8	–	1
East Carolina		–		–		2	–	9	–	0
Louisville		–		–		2	–	9	–	0
Tulane		–		–		1	–	10	–	0
Rankings from AP Poll

The 1985 Syracuse Orangemen football team represented Syracuse University as an independent during the 1985 NCAA Division I-A football season. Led by fifth-year head coach Dick MacPherson, the Orangemen compiled a record of 7–5 and lost in the Cherry Bowl to Maryland. Syracuse played home games at the Carrier Dome in Syracuse, New York.

Notable players included Tim Green, who earned unanimous All-American honors at defensive tackle and was a finalist for the Lombardi Award. Green was drafted 17th overall in the 1986 NFL draft, ending his career at Syracuse as the school's all-time leader in sacks with 45.5, a record that he still owns.

== Schedule ==
Date	Opponent	Site	Result	Attendance	Source
September 14	at Mississippi State	Scott Field; Starkville, MS	L 3–30	26,832	
September 21	Kent State	Carrier Dome; Syracuse, NY	W 34–0	29,822	
September 28	at Virginia Tech	Lane Stadium; Blacksburg, VA	L 14–24	33,400	
October 5	Louisville	Carrier Dome; Syracuse, NY	W 48–0	26,922	
October 19	No. 6 Penn State	Carrier Dome; Syracuse, NY (rivalry)	L 20–24	50,021	
October 26	Temple	Carrier Dome; Syracuse, NY	W 29–14	45,391	
November 2	at Pittsburgh	Pitt Stadium; Pittsburgh, PA (rivalry)	W 12–0	25,500	
November 9	at Navy	Navy–Marine Corps Memorial Stadium; Annapolis, MD	W 24–20	25,049	
November 16	Boston College	Carrier Dome; Syracuse, NY (rivalry)	W 41–21	45,790	
November 23	at Rutgers	Rutgers Stadium; Piscataway, NJ	W 31–14	19,685	
November 30	West Virginia	Carrier Dome; Syracuse, NY (rivalry)	L 10–13	33,431	
December 21	vs. No. 20 Maryland	Pontiac Silverdome; Pontiac, MI (Cherry Bowl)	L 18–35	51,858	
Rankings from AP Poll released prior to the game
