= 1985 Louisville Cardinals football team =

American college football season

1985 Louisville Cardinals football
- Conference: Independent
- Record: 2–9
- Head coach: Howard Schnellenberger (1st season)
- Home stadium: Cardinal Stadium

1985 NCAA Division I-A independents football records
	Conf.					Overall
Team	W		L		T	W		L		T
No. 3 Penn State		–		–		11	–	1	–	0
No. 9 Miami (FL)		–		–		10	–	2	–	0
Army		–		–		9	–	3	–	0
No. 15 Florida State		–		–		9	–	3	–	0
West Virginia		–		–		7	–	3	–	1
Southern Miss		–		–		7	–	4	–	0
Syracuse		–		–		7	–	5	–	0
Virginia Tech		–		–		6	–	5	–	0
Pittsburgh		–		–		5	–	5	–	1
Cincinnati		–		–		5	–	6	–	0
Notre Dame		–		–		5	–	6	–	0
South Carolina		–		–		5	–	6	–	0
Southwestern Louisiana		–		–		4	–	7	–	0
Navy		–		–		4	–	7	–	0
Temple		–		–		4	–	7	–	0
Boston College		–		–		4	–	8	–	0
Memphis State		–		–		2	–	7	–	2
Rutgers		–		–		2	–	8	–	1
East Carolina		–		–		2	–	9	–	0
Louisville		–		–		2	–	9	–	0
Tulane		–		–		1	–	10	–	0
Rankings from AP Poll

The 1985 Louisville Cardinals football team represented the University of Louisville in the 1985 NCAA Division I-A football season. The Cardinals, led by first-year head coach Howard Schnellenberger, participated as independents and played their home games at Cardinal Stadium.

== Schedule ==
Date	Opponent	Site	Result	Attendance	Source
September 7	at West Virginia	Mountaineer Field; Morgantown, WV	L 13–52	62,128	
September 14	at Indiana	Memorial Stadium; Bloomington, IN	L 28–41	37,626	
September 21	Western Kentucky	Cardinal Stadium; Louisville, KY	W 23–14	36,914	
September 28	Houston	Cardinal Stadium; Louisville, KY	L 27–49	30,334	
October 5	at Syracuse	Carrier Dome; Syracuse, NY	L 0–48	26,992	
October 12	Southern Miss	Cardinal Stadium; Louisville, KY	L 12–42	25,843	
October 19	Cincinnati	Cardinal Stadium; Louisville, KY (rivalry)	L 9–31	21,283	
October 26	at No. 15 Miami (FL)	Miami Orange Bowl; Miami, FL (rivalry)	L 7–45	31,761	
November 2	UCF^{†}	Cardinal Stadium; Louisville, KY	W 42–21	21,391	
November 9	at Virginia Tech	Lane Stadium; Blacksburg, VA	L 17–41	28,300	
November 23	Eastern Kentucky	Cardinal Stadium; Louisville, KY	L 21–45	30,113	
^{†}Homecoming; Rankings from AP Poll released prior to the game
