= 1985 Boston College Eagles football team =

American college football season

1985 Boston College Eagles football
- Conference: Independent
- Record: 4–8
- Head coach: Jack Bicknell (5th season)
- Defensive coordinator: Seymour "Red" Kelin (5th season)
- Captains: Shawn Regent; Mike Ruth; Troy Stradford
- Home stadium: Alumni Stadium; Sullivan Stadium

1985 Major eastern college football independents records
	Conf.					Overall
Team	W		L		T	W		L		T
No. 3 Penn State $	6	–	0	–	0	11	–	1	–	0
West Virginia	4	–	1	–	1	7	–	3	–	1
Syracuse	4	–	2	–	0	7	–	5	–	0
Boston College	3	–	3	–	0	4	–	8	–	0
Pittsburgh	2	–	3	–	1	5	–	5	–	1
Temple	1	–	5	–	0	4	–	7	–	0
Rutgers	0	–	6	–	0	2	–	8	–	1
$ – Lambert Trophy Winner; Rankings from AP Poll

1985 NCAA Division I-A independents football records
	Conf.					Overall
Team	W		L		T	W		L		T
No. 3 Penn State		–		–		11	–	1	–	0
No. 9 Miami (FL)		–		–		10	–	2	–	0
Army		–		–		9	–	3	–	0
No. 15 Florida State		–		–		9	–	3	–	0
West Virginia		–		–		7	–	3	–	1
Southern Miss		–		–		7	–	4	–	0
Syracuse		–		–		7	–	5	–	0
Virginia Tech		–		–		6	–	5	–	0
Pittsburgh		–		–		5	–	5	–	1
Cincinnati		–		–		5	–	6	–	0
Notre Dame		–		–		5	–	6	–	0
South Carolina		–		–		5	–	6	–	0
Southwestern Louisiana		–		–		4	–	7	–	0
Navy		–		–		4	–	7	–	0
Temple		–		–		4	–	7	–	0
Boston College		–		–		4	–	8	–	0
Memphis State		–		–		2	–	7	–	2
Rutgers		–		–		2	–	8	–	1
East Carolina		–		–		2	–	9	–	0
Louisville		–		–		2	–	9	–	0
Tulane		–		–		1	–	10	–	0
Rankings from AP Poll

The 1985 Boston College Eagles football team represented Boston College as an independent during the 1985 NCAA Division I-A football season. The Eagles were led by fifth-year head coach Jack Bicknell, and played their home games at Alumni Stadium in Chestnut Hill, Massachusetts. They also played two alternate-site home games at Sullivan Stadium (later known as Foxboro Stadium) in Foxborough, Massachusetts. The Eagles failed to replicate their 1984 success after the departure of their Heisman Trophy-winning quarterback, Doug Flutie, finishing with a 4–8 record.

== Schedule ==
Date	Opponent	Site	Result	Attendance	Source
August 29	vs. No. 10 BYU	Giants Stadium; East Rutherford, NJ (Kickoff Classic)	L 14–28	51,227	
September 7	Temple	Alumni Stadium; Chestnut Hill, MA	W 28–25	31,500	
September 14	No. 17 Maryland	Sullivan Stadium; Foxborough, MA	L 13–31	30,210	
September 21	at Pittsburgh	Pitt Stadium; Pittsburgh, PA	W 29–22	40,922	
September 28	Miami (FL)	Sullivan Stadium; Foxborough, MA	L 10–45	31,864	
October 5	at Rutgers	Giants Stadium; East Rutherford, NJ	W 20–10	17,456	
October 12	at Army	Michie Stadium; West Point, NY	L 14–45	40,525	
October 19	West Virginia	Alumni Stadium; Chestnut Hill, MA	L 6–13	32,000	
October 26	at Cincinnati	Riverfront Stadium; Cincinnati, OH	L 17–24	17,217	
November 2	at No. 3 Penn State	Beaver Stadium; University Park, PA	L 12–16	82,000	
November 16	at Syracuse	Carrier Dome; Syracuse, NY	L 21–41	45,790	
November 23	Holy Cross	Alumni Stadium; Chestnut Hill, MA (rivalry)	W 38–7	32,000	
Rankings from AP Poll released prior to the game

== Roster ==
1985 Boston College Eagles football team roster
Players
Coaches
Offense

Pos.	#	Name	Class
WR	26	Darren Flutie	So
QB	7	Shawn Halloran	Jr
WR	82	Kevin Martin	Jr
RB	23	Troy Stradford	Jr
G	65	Steve Trapilo	Jr
C		Darren Twombly	Jr
WR	20	Tom Waddle	Fr
OT	69	Dave Widell	Jr
G	74	Doug Widell	So
OL	64	Joe Wolf	Fr

Defense

Pos.	#	Name	Class
DT	97	John Bosa	Sr
LB	55	John Galvin	Jr
DT	72	Tom Porell	Jr
LB	53	Bill Romanowski	So
DT	68	Mike Ruth	Sr

Special teams

Pos.	#	Name	Class

Head coach

- Jack Bicknell

Coordinators/assistant coaches

Legend

- (C) Team captain
- (S) Suspended
- (I) Ineligible
- Injured
- Redshirt
