= 1985 Southern Miss Golden Eagles football team =

American college football season

1985 Southern Miss Golden Eagles football
- Conference: Independent
- Record: 7–4
- Head coach: Jim Carmody (4th season)
- Offensive coordinator: Keith Daniels (4th season)
- Home stadium: M. M. Roberts Stadium

1985 NCAA Division I-A independents football records
	Conf.					Overall
Team	W		L		T	W		L		T
No. 3 Penn State		–		–		11	–	1	–	0
No. 9 Miami (FL)		–		–		10	–	2	–	0
Army		–		–		9	–	3	–	0
No. 15 Florida State		–		–		9	–	3	–	0
West Virginia		–		–		7	–	3	–	1
Southern Miss		–		–		7	–	4	–	0
Syracuse		–		–		7	–	5	–	0
Virginia Tech		–		–		6	–	5	–	0
Pittsburgh		–		–		5	–	5	–	1
Cincinnati		–		–		5	–	6	–	0
Notre Dame		–		–		5	–	6	–	0
South Carolina		–		–		5	–	6	–	0
Southwestern Louisiana		–		–		4	–	7	–	0
Navy		–		–		4	–	7	–	0
Temple		–		–		4	–	7	–	0
Boston College		–		–		4	–	8	–	0
Memphis State		–		–		2	–	7	–	2
Rutgers		–		–		2	–	8	–	1
East Carolina		–		–		2	–	9	–	0
Louisville		–		–		2	–	9	–	0
Tulane		–		–		1	–	10	–	0
Rankings from AP Poll

The 1985 Southern Miss Golden Eagles football team was an American football team that represented the University of Southern Mississippi as an independent during the 1985 NCAA Division I-A football season. In their fourth year under head coach Jim Carmody, the team compiled a 7–4 record.

== Schedule ==
Date	Opponent	Site	Result	Attendance	Source
September 7	Louisiana Tech	M. M. Roberts Stadium; Hattiesburg, MS (rivalry)	W 28–0	23,432	
September 14	at No. 1 Auburn	Jordan–Hare Stadium; Auburn, AL	L 18–29	68,000	
September 21	vs. Mississippi State	Mississippi Veterans Memorial Stadium; Jackson, MS	L 20–23	54,300	
September 28	Northwestern State	M. M. Roberts Stadium; Hattiesburg, MS	W 14–7	18,216	
October 5	Southwestern Louisiana	M. M. Roberts Stadium; Hattiesburg, MS	W 38–16	17,344	
October 12	at Louisville	Cardinal Stadium; Louisville, KY	W 42–12	25,843	
October 19	at Memphis State	Liberty Bowl Memorial Stadium; Memphis, TN (rivalry)	W 14–7	21,033	
November 2	East Carolina^{†}	M. M. Roberts Stadium; Hattiesburg, MS	W 27–0	23,496	
November 9	at Colorado State	Hughes Stadium; Fort Collins, CO	L 17–35	3,812	
November 16	at No. 20 Alabama	Bryant–Denny Stadium; Tuscaloosa, AL	L 13–24	58,714	
November 23	Tulane	M. M. Roberts Stadium; Hattiesburg, MS (rivalry)	W 24–6	21,753	
^{†}Homecoming; Rankings from AP Poll released prior to the game
