= 1985 Memphis State Tigers football team =

American college football season

1985 Memphis State Tigers football
- Conference: Independent
- Record: 2–7-2
- Head coach: Rey Dempsey (2nd season)
- Offensive coordinator: Mike Wallace (2nd season)
- Defensive coordinator: Carl Angelo (2nd season)
- Home stadium: Liberty Bowl Memorial Stadium

1985 NCAA Division I-A independents football records
	Conf.					Overall
Team	W		L		T	W		L		T
No. 3 Penn State		–		–		11	–	1	–	0
No. 9 Miami (FL)		–		–		10	–	2	–	0
Army		–		–		9	–	3	–	0
No. 15 Florida State		–		–		9	–	3	–	0
West Virginia		–		–		7	–	3	–	1
Southern Miss		–		–		7	–	4	–	0
Syracuse		–		–		7	–	5	–	0
Virginia Tech		–		–		6	–	5	–	0
Pittsburgh		–		–		5	–	5	–	1
Cincinnati		–		–		5	–	6	–	0
Notre Dame		–		–		5	–	6	–	0
South Carolina		–		–		5	–	6	–	0
Southwestern Louisiana		–		–		4	–	7	–	0
Navy		–		–		4	–	7	–	0
Temple		–		–		4	–	7	–	0
Boston College		–		–		4	–	8	–	0
Memphis State		–		–		2	–	7	–	2
Rutgers		–		–		2	–	8	–	1
East Carolina		–		–		2	–	9	–	0
Louisville		–		–		2	–	9	–	0
Tulane		–		–		1	–	10	–	0
Rankings from AP Poll

The 1985 Memphis State Tigers football team represented Memphis State University (now known as the University of Memphis) as an independent in the 1985 NCAA Division I-A football season. The team was led by Rey Dempsey and played their home games at the Liberty Bowl Memorial Stadium in Memphis, Tennessee.

== Schedule ==
Date	Opponent	Site	Result	Attendance	Source
August 31	at Southwestern Louisiana	Cajun Field; Lafayette, LA	W 37–6	22,019	
September 7	Ole Miss	Liberty Bowl Memorial Stadium; Memphis, TN (rivalry)	T 17–17	50,936	
September 14	Murray State	Liberty Bowl Memorial Stadium; Memphis, TN	T 10–10	31,524	
September 21	at No. 6 Florida State	Doak Campbell Stadium; Tallahassee, FL	L 24–41	54,877	
October 5	at Mississippi State	Scott Field; Starkville, MS	L 28–31	26,012	
October 12	Tulane^{†}	Liberty Bowl Memorial Stadium; Memphis, TN	W 38–21	31,298	
October 19	Southern Miss	Liberty Bowl Memorial Stadium; Memphis, TN (rivalry)	L 7–14	21,033	
October 26	Alabama	Liberty Bowl Memorial Stadium; Memphis, TN	L 9–28	37,609	
November 2	at Virginia Tech	Lane Stadium; Blacksburg, VA	L 10–31	27,400	
November 9	Tennessee	Liberty Bowl Memorial Stadium; Memphis, TN	L 7–17	49,617	
November 16	at Army	Michie Stadium; West Point, NY	L 7–49	34,000	
^{†}Homecoming; Rankings from AP Poll released prior to the game
