= 1985 Virginia Tech Hokies football team =

American college football season

1985 Virginia Tech Hokies football
- Conference: Independent
- Record: 6–5
- Head coach: Bill Dooley (8th season)
- Defensive coordinator: Bob Brush (2nd season)
- Home stadium: Lane Stadium

1985 NCAA Division I-A independents football records
	Conf.					Overall
Team	W		L		T	W		L		T
No. 3 Penn State		–		–		11	–	1	–	0
No. 9 Miami (FL)		–		–		10	–	2	–	0
Army		–		–		9	–	3	–	0
No. 15 Florida State		–		–		9	–	3	–	0
West Virginia		–		–		7	–	3	–	1
Southern Miss		–		–		7	–	4	–	0
Syracuse		–		–		7	–	5	–	0
Virginia Tech		–		–		6	–	5	–	0
Pittsburgh		–		–		5	–	5	–	1
Cincinnati		–		–		5	–	6	–	0
Notre Dame		–		–		5	–	6	–	0
South Carolina		–		–		5	–	6	–	0
Southwestern Louisiana		–		–		4	–	7	–	0
Navy		–		–		4	–	7	–	0
Temple		–		–		4	–	7	–	0
Boston College		–		–		4	–	8	–	0
Memphis State		–		–		2	–	7	–	2
Rutgers		–		–		2	–	8	–	1
East Carolina		–		–		2	–	9	–	0
Louisville		–		–		2	–	9	–	0
Tulane		–		–		1	–	10	–	0
Rankings from AP Poll

The 1985 Virginia Tech Hokies football team was an American football team that represented Virginia Tech as an independent during the 1985 NCAA Division I-A football season. In their eighth year under head coach Bill Dooley, the Hokies compiled an overall record of 6–5.

== Schedule ==
Date	Opponent	Site	TV	Result	Attendance	Source
August 31	at Cincinnati	Nippert Stadium; Cincinnati, OH		L 14–31	15,762	
September 7	Richmond	Lane Stadium; Blacksburg, VA		L 14–24	21,100	
September 14	Clemson	Lane Stadium; Blacksburg, VA		L 17–20	31,100	
September 28	Syracuse	Lane Stadium; Blacksburg, VA	Home Team Sports	W 24–14	33,400	
October 5	at West Virginia	Mountaineer Field; Morgantown, WV (rivalry)		L 9–24	57,514	
October 12	No. T–4 (I-AA) William & Mary^{†}	Lane Stadium; Blacksburg, VA	Home Team Sports	W 40–10	38,700	
October 19	at Virginia	Scott Stadium; Charlottesville, VA (rivalry)		W 28–10	44,500	
October 26	at No. 2 Florida	Florida Field; Gainesville, FL		L 18–35	70,119	
November 2	Memphis State	Lane Stadium; Blacksburg, VA		W 31–10	27,400	
November 9	Louisville	Lane Stadium; Blacksburg, VA	Home Team Sports	W 41–17	28,300	
November 16	at Vanderbilt	Vanderbilt Stadium; Nashville, TN		W 38–24	35,286	
^{†}Homecoming; Rankings from AP Poll released prior to the game

== Roster ==
The following players were members of the 1985 football team.

1985 Virginia Tech Hokies football team roster
Players
Coaches
Offense Jeff Ballance Desmar Becton Malcolm Blacken Greg Brooks Mark Cox Scott Cruise Jim Davie Sean Donnelly Tim Dudley Steve Ellsworth David Everett John FitzHugh Bob Frulla Todd Grantham Todd Greenwood Dwayne Gwaltney Steve Hale Terrence Howell Eddie Hunter Mark Johnson Stacy Johnson Earnie Jones Kevin Keeffe Tom Mehr Stuart Plank Scott Rider Jeff Roberts Ron Singleton Allan Thomas Kent Thomas Maurice Williams

Pos.	#	Name	Class
TE		Steve Johnson
WR		Donald Snell

Defense Andy Ambers Dwight Ausbrooks Bo Blankenship Ranier Coleman Ray Fitts Alan Harris Eric Hayes Nolan Hazzard Robby Jackson Randy Jamison Victor Jones Kevin Lathan Joe Ledbetter Steve Mitchem Horacio Moronta Billy Myers Eddie Neel Paul Nelson Morgan Roane Rick Singleton Curtis Taliaferro Joe Turner Chuck Watson Mark Webb Lawrence White Carter Wiley

Pos.	#	Name	Class
LB		Jamel Agemy

Special teams David Cox Chris Kinzer Allen Talbott Tom Taricani

Pos.	#	Name	Class

Head coach

- Bill Dooley

Coordinators/assistant coaches

Legend

- (C) Team captain
- (S) Suspended
- (I) Ineligible
- Injured
- Redshirt
