= 1985 Gator Bowl =

Florida State Seminoles	Oklahoma State Cowboys
(8–3)	(8–3)
Independent	Big Eight
34	23
Head coach: Bobby Bowden	Head coach: Pat Jones
AP / Coaches; 18 / 16	AP / Coaches; 19 / 19
	1	2	3	4	Total
Florida State	3	10	14	7	34
Oklahoma State	0	0	17	6	23
- Date: December 30, 1985
- Season: 1985
- Stadium: Gator Bowl Stadium
- Location: Jacksonville, Florida
- MVP: Chip Ferguson (QB, Florida State) & Thurman Thomas (RB, Oklahoma State)
- Referee: Jim Kemerling (Big Ten)
- Attendance: 79,417

United States TV coverage
- Network: ABC
- Announcers: Al Michaels and Lee Grosscup

The 1985 Gator Bowl game was a post-season college football bowl game between the Florida State University Seminoles and the Oklahoma State Cowboys, and was played on Monday, December 30, 1985, at Gator Bowl Stadium in Jacksonville, Florida. It was the 41st edition of the bowl game.

== Game summary ==
Freshman quarterback Chip Ferguson threw for 338 yards and a pair of touchdowns, and Tony Smith added 201 yards rushing as Florida State defeated Oklahoma State, 34–23, in the 41st annual Gator Bowl.

FSU, which entered the game without its top three receivers, tricked Oklahoma State's defense by throwing on 15 of its first 20 plays. Derek Schmidt field goals of 23 and 39 yards, and a 39-yard touchdown catch by Herb Gainer sandwiched in between, gave FSU a 13–0 halftime lead.

Oklahoma State got on the scoreboard following the intermission when a 63-yard drive ended in a 33-yard field goal by Brad Dennis.

Ferguson, who was named Florida State's MVP, went back to the air, taking the Seminoles 73 yards on the next series before handing off to senior fullback Cletis Jones for a three-yard touchdown run. An interception by Deion Sanders gave the ball back to FSU, and Ferguson used just five plays before hitting Gainer with a 19-yard touchdown pass. That made the score 27–3, Florida State.

Oklahoma State didn't give up with Cowboy quarterback Ronnie William passing 29 yards to All-America tailback Thurman Thomas for an Oklahoma State touchdown. Following a Ferguson fumble, Williams handed off to Thomas, who threw back to the quarterback for a 12-yard touchdown that closed the score to 27–17.

Early in the fourth quarter, Ferguson scored from one yard out to give the Seminoles a 17-point cushion. The Cowboys added a late touchdown on a 31–yard pass from Williams to Hart Lee Dykes.

Sophomore wide receiver Randy White, who had never caught a pass at FSU, grabbed four passes for 87 yards in the first half while Gainer, who had caught just five during the regular season, hauled in seven for 148 yards and two touchdown. Smith's 201 rushing yards came on 24 carries.

The Seminole defense held Thomas in check the entire game, limiting him to 97 yards on 26 attempts. Florida State finished the season with a 9–3 record.
