= 1985 Southwestern Louisiana Ragin' Cajuns football team =

American college football season

1985 Southwestern Louisiana Ragin' Cajuns football
- Conference: Independent
- Record: 4–7
- Head coach: Sam Robertson (6th season)
- Home stadium: Cajun Field

1985 NCAA Division I-A independents football records
	Conf.					Overall
Team	W		L		T	W		L		T
No. 3 Penn State		–		–		11	–	1	–	0
No. 9 Miami (FL)		–		–		10	–	2	–	0
Army		–		–		9	–	3	–	0
No. 15 Florida State		–		–		9	–	3	–	0
West Virginia		–		–		7	–	3	–	1
Southern Miss		–		–		7	–	4	–	0
Syracuse		–		–		7	–	5	–	0
Virginia Tech		–		–		6	–	5	–	0
Pittsburgh		–		–		5	–	5	–	1
Cincinnati		–		–		5	–	6	–	0
Notre Dame		–		–		5	–	6	–	0
South Carolina		–		–		5	–	6	–	0
Southwestern Louisiana		–		–		4	–	7	–	0
Navy		–		–		4	–	7	–	0
Temple		–		–		4	–	7	–	0
Boston College		–		–		4	–	8	–	0
Memphis State		–		–		2	–	7	–	2
Rutgers		–		–		2	–	8	–	1
East Carolina		–		–		2	–	9	–	0
Louisville		–		–		2	–	9	–	0
Tulane		–		–		1	–	10	–	0
Rankings from AP Poll

The 1985 Southwestern Louisiana Ragin' Cajuns football team was an American football team that represented the University of Southwestern Louisiana (now known as the University of Louisiana at Lafayette) as an independent during the 1985 NCAA Division I-A football season. In their sixth year under head coach Sam Robertson, the team compiled a 4–7 record.

== Schedule ==
Date	Opponent	Site	Result	Attendance	Source
August 31	Memphis State	Cajun Field; Lafayette, LA	L 6–37	22,019	
September 7	at No. 2 Auburn	Jordan-Hare Stadium; Auburn, AL	L 7–49	60,000	
September 14	at Louisiana Tech	Joe Aillet Stadium; Ruston, LA (rivalry)	L 23–24	17,000	
September 21	Idaho State	Cajun Field; Lafayette, LA	W 31–30		
September 28	at Wichita State	Cessna Stadium; Wichita, KS	W 23–15	9,876	
October 5	at Southern Miss	M. M. Roberts Stadium; Hattiesburg, MS	L 16–38	17,344	
October 12	East Carolina	Cajun Field; Lafayette, LA	W 16–14	16,228	
October 19	at No. 5 Florida	Florida Field; Gainesville, FL	L 0–45	74,369	
October 26	at UNLV	Sam Boyd Silver Bowl; Whitney, NV	W 20–13	16,269	
November 9	at Tulane	Louisiana Superdome; New Orleans, LA	L 17–27	24,040	
November 16	McNeese State	Cajun Field; Lafayette, LA (Cajun Crown)	L 3–14		
Rankings from AP Poll released prior to the game
