= 1985 Pittsburgh Panthers football team =

American college football season

1985 Pittsburgh Panthers football
- Conference: Independent
- Record: 5–5–1
- Head coach: Foge Fazio (4th season)
- Offensive coordinator: Chuck Stobart (1st season)
- Offensive scheme: Multiple pro-style
- Defensive coordinator: Bob Junko (3rd season)
- Base defense: Multiple front
- Home stadium: Pitt Stadium

1985 Major eastern college football independents records
	Conf.					Overall
Team	W		L		T	W		L		T
No. 3 Penn State $	6	–	0	–	0	11	–	1	–	0
West Virginia	4	–	1	–	1	7	–	3	–	1
Syracuse	4	–	2	–	0	7	–	5	–	0
Boston College	3	–	3	–	0	4	–	8	–	0
Pittsburgh	2	–	3	–	1	5	–	5	–	1
Temple	1	–	5	–	0	4	–	7	–	0
Rutgers	0	–	6	–	0	2	–	8	–	1
$ – Lambert Trophy Winner; Rankings from AP Poll

1985 NCAA Division I-A independents football records
	Conf.					Overall
Team	W		L		T	W		L		T
No. 3 Penn State		–		–		11	–	1	–	0
No. 9 Miami (FL)		–		–		10	–	2	–	0
Army		–		–		9	–	3	–	0
No. 15 Florida State		–		–		9	–	3	–	0
West Virginia		–		–		7	–	3	–	1
Southern Miss		–		–		7	–	4	–	0
Syracuse		–		–		7	–	5	–	0
Virginia Tech		–		–		6	–	5	–	0
Pittsburgh		–		–		5	–	5	–	1
Cincinnati		–		–		5	–	6	–	0
Notre Dame		–		–		5	–	6	–	0
South Carolina		–		–		5	–	6	–	0
Southwestern Louisiana		–		–		4	–	7	–	0
Navy		–		–		4	–	7	–	0
Temple		–		–		4	–	7	–	0
Boston College		–		–		4	–	8	–	0
Memphis State		–		–		2	–	7	–	2
Rutgers		–		–		2	–	8	–	1
East Carolina		–		–		2	–	9	–	0
Louisville		–		–		2	–	9	–	0
Tulane		–		–		1	–	10	–	0
Rankings from AP Poll

The 1985 Pittsburgh Panthers football team represented the University of Pittsburgh as an independent during the 1985 NCAA Division I-A football season.

== Schedule ==
Date	Time	Opponent	Site	TV	Result	Attendance	Source
August 31	7:30 p.m.	Purdue	Pitt Stadium; Pittsburgh, PA	ESPN	W 31–30	50,103	
September 14	8:00 p.m.	at No. 9 Ohio State	Ohio Stadium; Columbus, OH	WTBS	L 7–10	88,518	
September 21	12:00 p.m.	Boston College	Pitt Stadium; Pittsburgh, PA	USA	L 22–29	40,922	
September 28	12:00 p.m.	at West Virginia	Mountaineer Field; Morgantown, WV (Backyard Brawl)	TCS	T 10–10	62,453	
October 5	12:00 p.m.	South Carolina	Pitt Stadium; Pittsburgh, PA	USA	W 42–7	37,277	
October 12	12:00 p.m.	NC State^{†}	Pitt Stadium; Pittsburgh, PA	USA	W 24–10	36,609	
October 19	12:00 p.m.	at Rutgers	Giants Stadium; East Rutherford, NJ		W 38–10	18,991	
October 26	2:00 p.m.	at Navy	Navy–Marine Corps Memorial Stadium; Annapolis, MD		L 7–21	29,343	
November 2	12:00 p.m.	Syracuse	Pitt Stadium; Pittsburgh, PA (rivalry)		L 0–12	25,500	
November 9	12:00 p.m.	at Temple	Veterans Stadium; Philadelphia, PA		W 21–17	19,428	
November 23	7:30 p.m.	No. 1 Penn State	Pitt Stadium; Pittsburgh, PA (rivalry)	ESPN	L 0–31	60,134	
^{†}Homecoming; Rankings from AP Poll released prior to the game; All times are in Eastern time

== Game summaries ==
=== Purdue ===
Purdue Boilermakers (0–0) at Pittsburgh Panthers (0–0)

Quarter	1	2	3	4	Total
Purdue	10	0	14	6	30
Pittsburgh	7	14	0	10	31

at Pitt Stadium, Pittsburgh, Pennsylvania

- Date: August 31, 1985
- Game time: 7:30 p.m. EDT
- Game weather: Clear, 60 °F (16 °C)
- Game attendance: 50,103
- TV announcers (ESPN): Jim Simpson and Paul Maguire

Game information

First quarter

- PUR – Jonathan Briggs 21-yard field goal. Purdue 3–0.
- PITT – Charles Gladman 5-yard run (Mark Brasco kick). Pittsburgh 7–3.
- PUR – Jim Everett 6-yard run (Jonathan Briggs kick). Purdue 10–7.

Second quarter

- PITT – Charles Scales 19-yard pass from John Congemi (Mark Brasco kick). Pittsburgh 14–10.
- PITT – Clint Wilson 5-yard pass from John Congemi (Mark Brasco kick). Pittsburgh 21–10.

Third quarter

- PUR – Steve Griffin 13-yard pass from Jim Everett (pass failed). Pittsburgh 21–16.
- PUR – Ray Wallace 10-yard pass from Jim Everett (pass good). Purdue 24–21.

Fourth quarter

- PITT – Charles Gladman 10-yard run (Mark Brasco kick). Pittsburgh 28–24.
- PITT – Mark Brasco 43-yard field goal. Pittsburgh 31–24.
- PUR – Ray Wallace 31-yard pass from Jim Everett (pass failed), 0:48. Pittsburgh 31–30.

Top passers

- PUR – Jim Everett – 34/53, 398 yards, 3 TD, 2 INT
- PITT – John Congemi – 10/19, 110 yards, 2 TD, INT

Top rushers

- PUR – Ray Wallace – 12 rushes, 59 yards
- PITT – Charles Gladman – 24 rushes, 163 yards, 2 TD

Top receivers

- PUR – Steve Griffin – 7 receptions, 102 yards, TD
- PITT – Charles Scales – 3 receptions, 48 yards, TD

External videos
- Television broadcast with Pittsburgh radio audio
- Final Purdue touchdown and two-point conversion attempt

== Personnel ==
1985 Pittsburgh Panthers football team roster
Players
Coaches
Offense

Pos.	#	Name	Class
RB		Anthony Brown
RB		Tom Brown
OL		Tony Brown
QB		John Congemi
RB		Brian Davis
OL		Randy Dixon
OL		Mike Dorundo
QB		Joe Felitsky
RB		Ezekial Gadson
RB		Charles Gladman
TE		Bob Lawson
WR		Dwayne Milloy
OL		Barry Pettyjohn
WR		Charles Scales
TE		David Shuck
OL		Bob Sign
WR		Mark Stanton
WR		Matt Stennett
WR		Michael Stewart
RB		Darnell Stone
WR		Reggie Williams
TE		Clint Wilson

Defense

Pos.	#	Name	Class
LB		Steve Apke
DL		Dennis Atiyeh
DB		Teryl Austin
DL		Bob Buczkowski
DB		Bill Callahan
DL		Jon Carter
DL		Lorenzo Freeman
DL		Burt Grossman
DL		Walter Johnson
DB		Quintin Jones
LB		Matt Lavigna
DB		John Lewis
LB		Jerry Olsavsky
DB		Billy Owens
DL		Bob Schilken
LB		Brian Shields
DL		Bill Sapio
LB		Jerry Wall
DB		Troy Washington
DL		Tony Woods

Special teams

Pos.	#	Name	Class
K		Mark Brasco
P		Scott Merlack
P		Bill Rudison
K	93	Pat Viancourt	Jr

Head coach

- Foge Fazio

Coordinators/assistant coaches

- John Hendrick (GA)
- Russ Jacques (QB/WR)
- Bob Junko (DC/LB)
- Bob LaCivita (RC)
- John Montgomery (TE)
- Joe Moore (OL)
- Buddy Morris (Str + Cond)
- Gerry Solomon (DE)
- Chuck Stobart (OC)
- Sal Sunseri (DL)
- Andy Urbanic (RB)
- Jay Venuto (GA)
- Trent Walters (DB)

Legend

- (C) Team captain
- (S) Suspended
- (I) Ineligible
- Injured
- Redshirt

== Team players drafted into the NFL ==
Player	Position	Round	Pick	NFL club
Bob Buczkowski	Defensive end	1	24	Los Angeles Raiders
Bill Callahan	Defensive back	4	94	Pittsburgh Steelers
