= 1985 Miami Hurricanes football team =

American college football season

1985 Miami Hurricanes football

Sugar Bowl, L 7–35 vs. Tennessee
- Conference: Independent

Ranking
- Coaches: No. 8
- AP: No. 9
- Record: 10–2
- Head coach: Jimmy Johnson (2nd season)
- Offensive coordinator: Gary Stevens (3rd season)
- Offensive scheme: Pro-style
- Defensive coordinator: Paul Jette (1st season)
- Base defense: 4–3
- MVP: Vinny Testaverde
- Home stadium: Miami Orange Bowl

1985 NCAA Division I-A independents football records
	Conf.					Overall
Team	W		L		T	W		L		T
No. 3 Penn State		–		–		11	–	1	–	0
No. 9 Miami (FL)		–		–		10	–	2	–	0
Army		–		–		9	–	3	–	0
No. 15 Florida State		–		–		9	–	3	–	0
West Virginia		–		–		7	–	3	–	1
Southern Miss		–		–		7	–	4	–	0
Syracuse		–		–		7	–	5	–	0
Virginia Tech		–		–		6	–	5	–	0
Pittsburgh		–		–		5	–	5	–	1
Cincinnati		–		–		5	–	6	–	0
Notre Dame		–		–		5	–	6	–	0
South Carolina		–		–		5	–	6	–	0
Southwestern Louisiana		–		–		4	–	7	–	0
Navy		–		–		4	–	7	–	0
Temple		–		–		4	–	7	–	0
Boston College		–		–		4	–	8	–	0
Memphis State		–		–		2	–	7	–	2
Rutgers		–		–		2	–	8	–	1
East Carolina		–		–		2	–	9	–	0
Louisville		–		–		2	–	9	–	0
Tulane		–		–		1	–	10	–	0
Rankings from AP Poll

The 1985 Miami Hurricanes football team represented the University of Miami as an independent during the 1985 NCAA Division I-A football season. It was the Hurricanes' 60th season of football. The Hurricanes were led by second-year head coach Jimmy Johnson and played their home games at the Miami Orange Bowl. They finished the season 10–2 overall. They were invited to the Sugar Bowl, where they lost to Tennessee, 35–7.

== Schedule ==
Date	Opponent	Rank	Site	TV	Result	Attendance	Source
September 7	No. 5 Florida		Miami Orange Bowl; Miami, FL (rivalry)		L 23–35	80,227	
September 14	at Rice		Rice Stadium; Houston, TX		W 48–20	15,411	
September 28	at Boston College		Sullivan Stadium; Foxborough, MA		W 45–10	31,864	
October 5	at East Carolina		Ficklen Memorial Stadium; Greenville, NC		W 27–15	34,511	
October 12	Cincinnati		Miami Orange Bowl; Miami, FL		W 38–0	30,164	
October 19	at No. 3 Oklahoma		Oklahoma Memorial Stadium; Norman, OK	ABC	W 27–14	73,102	
October 26	Louisville	No. 15	Miami Orange Bowl; Miami, FL (rivalry)		W 45–7	31,761	
November 2	at No. 10 Florida State	No. 11	Doak Campbell Stadium; Tallahassee, FL (rivalry)	ABC	W 35–27	61,250	
November 9	at Maryland	No. 8	Memorial Stadium; Baltimore, MD	CBS	W 29–22	62,350	
November 23	Colorado State^{†}	No. 4	Miami Orange Bowl; Miami, FL		W 24–3	35,035	
November 30	Notre Dame	No. 4	Miami Orange Bowl; Miami, FL (rivalry)	CBS	W 58–7	49,236	
January 1	vs. No. 8 Tennessee	No. 2	Louisiana Superdome; New Orleans, LA (Sugar Bowl)	ABC	L 7–35	77,432	
^{†}Homecoming; Rankings from AP Poll released prior to the game

== Personnel ==
=== Roster ===
Player	Class	Pos	Summary
Vinny Testaverde*		QB	216 Cmp, 352 Att, 3238 Yds, 21 TD
Geoff Torretta		QB	11 Cmp, 16 Att, 263 Yds, 3 TD
Alonzo Highsmith*		RB	117 Att, 451 Yds, 3.9 Avg
Warren Williams*		RB	89 Att, 522 Yds, 5.9 Avg
Melvin Bratton		RB	67 Att, 285 Yds, 4.3 Avg
Darryl Oliver		RB	66 Att, 264 Yds, 4.0 Avg
J.C. Penny		RB	21 Att, 181 Yds, 8.6 Avg
Todd Stanish		RB	11 Att, 31 Yds, 2.8 Avg
Steve Staffier		RB	2 Att, 8 Yds, 4.0 Avg
Michael Irvin*		WR	46 Rec, 840 Yds, 18.3 Avg
Brian Blades*		WR	30 Rec, 657 Yds, 21.9 Avg
Brett Perriman		WR	14 Rec, 263 Yds, 18.8 Avg
Kenny Oliver		WR	5 Rec, 125 Yds, 25.0 Avg
Andre Brown		WR	2 Rec, 23 Yds, 11.5 Avg
Willie Smith*		TE	48 Rec, 669 Yds, 13.9 Avg
Charles Henry		TE	4 Rec, 48 Yds, 12.0 Avg
Alfredo Roberts		TE	1 Rec, 4 Yds, 4.0 Avg
Dave Alekna*		OL	
Paul Bertucelli*		OL	
Ed Davis*		OL	
Paul O'Connor*		OL	
Greg Rakoczy*		OL	
John O'Neill		OL	
Matt Patchan		OL	
Jerome Brown*		DL	
Kevin Fagan*		DL	
Derwin Jones*		DL	
John McVeigh*		DL	
Victor Morris		DL	
Dan Sileo		DL	
Daniel Stubbs		DL	
Rod Carter*		LB	
Bruce Fleming*		LB	
Randy Shannon*		LB	
Winston Moss		LB	
Tolbert Bain*		DB	
Selwyn Brown*		DB	
Donald Ellis*		DB	
Darrell Fullington*		DB	
Bennie Blades		DB	
Jeff Feagles		P	

1985 Miami Hurricanes football team roster
Players
Coaches
Offense

Pos.	#	Name	Class
QB	14	Vinny Testaverde	Jr
RB	5	Melvin Bratton	So
RB	43	Cleveland Gary	Fr
RB	30	Alonzo Highsmith	Jr
RB	24	Warren Williams	So
WR	9	Brian Blades	So
WR	83	Andre Brown	Fr
WR	47	Michael Irvin	Fr
WR	33	Brett Perriman	So
OL	52	Darren Bruce	Fr
OL	75	John O'Neill	Fr
TE	87	Alfredo Roberts	So

Defense

Pos.	#	Name	Class
LB	91	Rod Carter	Fr
DB	19	Darrell Fullington	So
LB	22	Randy Shannon	Fr
DB	36	Bennie Blades	So
LB	45	George Mira Jr.	So
DE	96	Daniel Stubbs	So
DL	93	John McVeigh	Sr
DT	95	Kevin Fagan	Sr

Special teams

Pos.	#	Name	Class
K	25	Greg Cox	So
P	38	Jeff Feagles	So

Head coach

- Jimmy Johnson

Coordinators/assistant coaches

Legend

- (C) Team captain
- (S) Suspended
- (I) Ineligible
- Injured
- Redshirt

=== Recruits ===
Jimmy Johnson and his staff had the key recruit in the 1985 class QB Steve Walsh Jimmy also continued collecting talent from Florida, "Ten of the 19 signees are from Florida. Last year, 18 of the 25 high school players who signed letters were from Florida (11 from Dade and Broward), and 19 of 26 who signed in 1983 were from Florida (nine from Dade and Broward)."

=== Coaching staff ===
Name	Position	Seasons	Alma mater
Jimmy Johnson	Head coach	2nd	Arkansas (1965)
Gary Stevens	Offensive coordinator/quarterbacks	6th	John Carroll (1965)
Paul Jette	Defensive coordinator/defensive backs	1st	Texas (1977)
Hubbard Alexander	Wide receivers	7th	Tennessee State (1962)
Joe Brodsky	Running backs	8th	Florida (1956)
Butch Davis	Defensive line	2nd	Arkansas (1973)
Art Kehoe	Assistant offensive line	1st	Miami (1982)
Don Soldinger	Tight ends	2nd	Memphis (1967)
Tony Wise	Offensive line	1st	Ithaca (1972)
Mike Knoll	Linebackers	2nd	Missouri Western State (1975)

=== Support staff ===
Name	Position	Seasons	Alma mater
Bill Foran	Strength & conditioning	1st	Central Michigan (1977)
Tom Ciskowski	Volunteer assistant		
Mark Gibson	Volunteer assistant		

== Game summaries ==
=== at No. 3 Oklahoma ===
Team	1	2	3	4	Total
• Hurricanes	7	7	13	0	27
No. 3 Sooners	7	0	0	7	14

- Date: October 19
- Location: Oklahoma Memorial Stadium, Norman, Oklahoma
- Game weather: Overcast
- TV announcers (ABC): Keith Jackson, Frank Broyles, and Tim Brant

Scoring summary
1	8:44	Miami (FL)	Michael Irvin 56-yard pass from Vinny Testaverde (Greg Cox kick)	Miami (FL) 7-0
1	6:34	OU	Derrick Shepard 14-yard pass from Troy Aikman (Tim Lashar kick)	Tied 7-7
2	14:16	Miami (FL)	Testaverde 3-yard run (Cox kick)	Miami (FL) 14-7
3	8:49	Miami (FL)	Cox 20-yard field goal	Miami (FL) 17-7
3	4:06	Miami (FL)	Brian Blades 35-yard pass from Testaverde (Cox kick)	Miami (FL) 24-7
3	2:34	Miami (FL)	Cox 36-yard field goal	Miami (FL) 27-7
4	10:28	OU	Lydell Carr 1-yard run (Lashar kick)	Miami (FL) 27-14

=== at No. 10 Florida State ===
#11 Miami (FL) at #10 Florida State

Team	1	2	3	4	Total
• No. 11 Hurricanes	14	0	7	14	35
No. 10 Seminoles	14	10	0	3	27

- Date: November 2
- Location: Doak Campbell Stadium, Tallahassee, Florida
- Game attendance: 61,250
- TV announcers (ABC): Tim Brant

Scoring summary
1	10:04	FSU	Hassan Jones 8-yard pass from Chip Ferguson (Schmidt kick)	FSU 7-0
1	7:23	Miami (FL)	Brian Blades 10-yard pass from Vinny Testaverde (Cox kick)	Tied 7-7
1	7:06	Miami (FL)	Blades 38-yard pass from Testaverde (Cox kick)	Miami (FL) 14-7
1	0:25	FSU	Brian Davis blocked punt recovery in end zone (Schmidt kick)	Tied 14-14
2	6:52	FSU	Derek Schmidt 37-yard field goal	FSU 17-14
2	2:39	FSU	Pat Carter 26-yard pass from Chip Ferguson (Schmidt kick)	FSU 24-14
3	8:15	Miami (FL)	2-yard fun (Cox kick)	FSU 24-21
4	11:07	FSU	Derek Schmidt 44-yard field goal	FSU 27-21
4	9:55	Miami (FL)	Michael Irvin 30-yard pass from Testaverde (Cox kick)	Miami (FL) 28-27
4	3:06	Miami (FL)	Brett Perriman 2-yard pass from Testaverde (Cox kick)	Miami (FL) 35-27

Despite being sacked seven times, Vinny Testaverde passed the Hurricanes to victory with 339 yards and four touchdowns.

=== at Maryland ===
Miami (FL) at Maryland

Team	1	2	3	4	Total
• No. 8 Hurricanes	0	13	7	9	29
Terrapins	10	3	9	0	22

- Date: November 9
- Location: Baltimore Memorial Stadium, Baltimore, MD
- Game attendance: 62,350
- TV announcers (CBS): Brent Musburger (play-by-play), Ara Parseghian (analyst), and Pat O'Brien (sideline)

=== Colorado State ===
Colorado State at Miami (FL)

Team	1	2	3	4	Total
Rams	0	0	3	0	3
• No. 4 Hurricanes	0	3	7	14	24

- Date: November 23
- Location: Miami Orange Bowl, Miami
- Game attendance: 35,035

Scoring summary
2	MIA	Greg Cox 25-yard field goal	MIA 3-0
3	CSU	DeLine 44-yard field goal	Tied 3-3
3	MIA	Highsmith 3-yard run (Greg Cox kick)	MIA 10-3
4	MIA	Bratton 1-yard run (Greg Cox kick)	MIA 17-3
4	MIA	Oliver 5-yard run (Greg Cox kick)	MIA 24-3

=== Notre Dame ===
Notre Dame at Miami (FL)

Team	1	2	3	4	Total
Fighting Irish	0	7	0	0	7
• No. 4 Hurricanes	13	14	10	21	58

- Date: November 30
- Location: Miami Orange Bowl, Miami
- TV announcers (CBS): Brent Musburger (play-by-play), Ara Parseghian (analyst), and Pat O'Brien (sideline)

Scoring summary
1		MIA	Greg Cox 39-yard field goal	MIA 3-0
1		MIA	W. Williams 6-yard run (Greg Cox kick)	MIA 10-0
1		MIA	Greg Cox 47-yard field goal	MIA 13-0
2		MIA	Bennie Blades 61-yard interception return (Cox kick)	MIA 20-0
2		ND	Allen Pinkett 3-yard run (John Carney kick)	MIA 20-7
2		MIA	Melvin Bratton 7-yard pass from Vinny Testaverde (Cox kick)	MIA 27-7
3		MIA	Greg Cox 48-yard field goal	MIA 30-7
3		MIA	Michael Irvin 15-yard pass from Vinny Testaverde (Greg Cox kick)	MIA 37-7
4		MIA	Vinny Testaverde 1-yard run (Greg Cox kick)	MIA 44-7
4		MIA	Andre Brown 17-yard pass from Geoff Torretta (Seelig kick)	MIA 51-7
4	4:44	MIA	Bill Hawkins recovered blocked punt in end zone (Greg Cox kick)	MIA 58-7

Miami scored the most points in a game since 1967. The Hurricanes scored on their first four possessions, the fifth was ended when time ran out at halftime, and then they scored the first four times they got the ball in the second half.

=== vs. No. 8 Tennessee (Sugar Bowl) ===
Miami (FL) vs. Tennessee

Team	1	2	3	4	Total
No. 2 Hurricanes	7	0	0	0	7
• No. 8 Volunteers	0	14	14	7	35

- Date: January 1
- Location: Louisiana Superdome, New Orleans, Louisiana
- Game attendance: 77,432
- Game weather: Indoors
- TV announcers (ABC): Keith Jackson, Frank Broyles, and Tim Brant

Scoring summary
1	Miami (FL)	Michael Irvin 18-yard pass from Vinny Testaverde (Greg Cox kick)	Miami 7-0
2	Tennessee	Jeff Smith 6-yard pass from Daryl Dickey (Fuad Reveiz kick)	Tied 7-7
2	Tennessee	Tim McGee fumble recovery in end zone (Reveiz kick)	Tennessee 14-7
3	Tennessee	Henderson 1-yard run (Reveiz kick)	Tennessee 21-7
3	Tennessee	Jeff Powell 60-yard run (Reveiz kick)	Tennessee 28-7
4	Tennessee	Charles Wilson 6-yard run (Reveiz kick)	Tennessee 35-7

== 1986 NFL draft ==
Player	Position	Round	Pick	NFL club
Kevin Fagan	Defensive tackle	4	102	San Francisco 49ers
Reggie Sutton	Defensive back	5	115	New Orleans Saints
Willie Smith	Tight end	10	265	Cleveland Browns
John McVeigh	Linebacker	12	321	Seattle Seahawks
