= Mike Perrino =

American football player (born 1964)

No. 64
- Position: Offensive tackle

Personal information
- Born: March 2, 1964 (age 62); Chicago, Illinois, U.S.
- Listed height: 6 ft 5 in (1.96 m)
- Listed weight: 285 lb (129 kg)

Career information
- High school: York (Elmhurst, Illinois)
- College: Notre Dame
- NFL draft: 1986: 8th round, 209th overall pick

Career history
- San Diego Chargers (1986)*; Philadelphia Eagles (1987)
- * Offseason or practice squad member only

Career NFL statistics
- Games played: 3
- Games started: 3
- Stats at Pro Football Reference

Mike Perrino (born March 2, 1964) is an American former professional football player who was a tackle in the National Football League (NFL). He played college football for the Notre Dame Fighting Irish and was selected by the San Diego Chargers in the eighth round of the 1986 NFL draft. He played in three games for the Philadelphia Eagles in 1987.
