= Randy Watts =

American football player (born 1963)

No. 94
- Position: Defensive end

Personal information
- Born: June 22, 1963 (age 63); Sandersville, Georgia, U.S.
- Listed height: 6 ft 6 in (1.98 m)
- Listed weight: 275 lb (125 kg)

Career information
- High school: Washington County (GA)
- College: Catawba
- NFL draft: 1987: 9th round, 244th overall pick

Career history
- Kansas City Chiefs (1987)*; Dallas Cowboys (1987); Kansas City Chiefs (1989)*; Atlanta Falcons (1990)*
- * Offseason or practice squad member only

Career NFL statistics
- Sacks: 3
- Fumble recoveries: 1
- Stats at Pro Football Reference

Randy Watts (born June 22, 1963) is an American former professional football player who was a defensive end in the National Football League (NFL) for the Dallas Cowboys. He played college football for the Catawba Indians.

== Early life ==
Watts attended Washington County High School, in Sandersville, Georgia, where he participated in football, basketball, and track. He led the football team in receiving in his last three seasons.

He accepted a football scholarship from East Carolina University. He was a reserve defensive end in his first two seasons. As a junior, he transferred to NAIA Catawba College, where he was named a starter at defensive tackle, registering 99 tackles and 7.5 sacks. As a senior, he was moved to defensive end, posting 66 tackles and 5 sacks.

== Professional career ==
=== Kansas City Chiefs (first stint) ===
Watts was selected by the Kansas City Chiefs in the ninth round (244th overall) of the 1987 NFL draft. He was waived on September 7.

=== Dallas Cowboys ===
After the NFLPA strike was declared on the third week of the 1987 season, those contests were canceled (reducing the 16 game season to 15) and the NFL decided that the games would be played with replacement players. He signed to be a part of the Dallas replacement team that was given the mock name "Rhinestone Cowboys" by the media. He had 7 tackles, one fumble recovery and 3 sacks (tied for the team lead) in 3 games. He was waived in November.

In 1988, he was re-signed to participate in training camp. He was released on August 18.

=== Kansas City Chiefs (second stint) ===
In 1989, he was signed as a free agent by the Kansas City Chiefs. He was released on August 29.

=== Atlanta Falcons ===
In 1990, he was signed by the Atlanta Falcons as a free agent. He was released on August 28.
