= Robin Ross (American football) =

American football coach (born 1954)

Profile
- Position: Linebackers coach

Personal information
- Born: August 17, 1954 (age 72); Huntington Park, California, U.S.

Career information
- High school: El Rancho (Pico Rivera, California)
- College: Rio Hondo (1972–1973); Washington State (1974–1975)
- NFL draft: 1976: 10th round, 275th overall pick

Career history

Playing
- San Francisco 49ers (1976)*; Seattle Seahawks (1976)*
- * Offseason or practice squad member only

Coaching
- Long Beach State (1977–1983) Defensive line coach & offensive line coach; Cincinnati (1984–1985) Defensive coordinator & defensive line coach; Washington State (1986) Defensive line coach; Iowa State (1987–1993) Defensive coordinator; Western Washington (1994–1995) Defensive coordinator; Fresno State (1996) Defensive coordinator; Oregon (1997–1998) Defensive line coach & linebackers coach; Oakland Raiders (1999–2000) Linebackers coach; Oregon (2001–2004) Special teams coordinator & tight ends coach; Oregon State (2005) Linebackers coach; Western Washington (2006–2008) Head coach; Oregon State (2009–2010) Tight ends coach; UNLV (2011) Linebackers coach; Wyoming (2012–2013) Special teams coordinator & linebackers coach; BC Lions (2015–2017) Defensive line coach; Hamilton Tiger-Cats (2019–2023) Linebackers coach

Awards and highlights
- Second Team All-Pac-8 (1975)

Robin Lee Ross (born August 17, 1954) is an American gridiron football coach. He was most recently the linebackers coach for the Hamilton Tiger-Cats of the Canadian Football League (CFL).

== College career ==
Ross played college football for Rio Hondo College and the Washington State Cougars.

== Professional career ==
Ross was drafted 275th overall in the tenth round of the 1976 NFL draft by the San Francisco 49ers of the National Football League (NFL). He also played for the Seattle Seahawks.

== Coaching career ==
Ross has coached for Long Beach State, Cincinnati, Washington State, Iowa State, Western Washington, Fresno State, Oregon, Oregon State, UNLV, and Wyoming. He was the head football coach for Western Washington University from 2006 until the school dropped the sport in 2008. He has also coached for the Oakland Raiders and the BC Lions.

== Head coaching record ==
Year	Team	Overall	Conference	Standing	Bowl/playoffs
Western Washington Vikings (North Central Conference) (2006–2007)
2006	Western Washington	5–6	3–5	T–5th	
2007	Western Washington	2–8	1–7	T–8th	
Western Washington Vikings (Great Northwest Athletic Conference) (2008)
2008	Western Washington	6–5	5–3	T–2nd	W Dixie Rotary
Western Washington:		13–19	9–15		
Total:		13–19			
