= Napoleon McCallum =

American football player (born 1963)

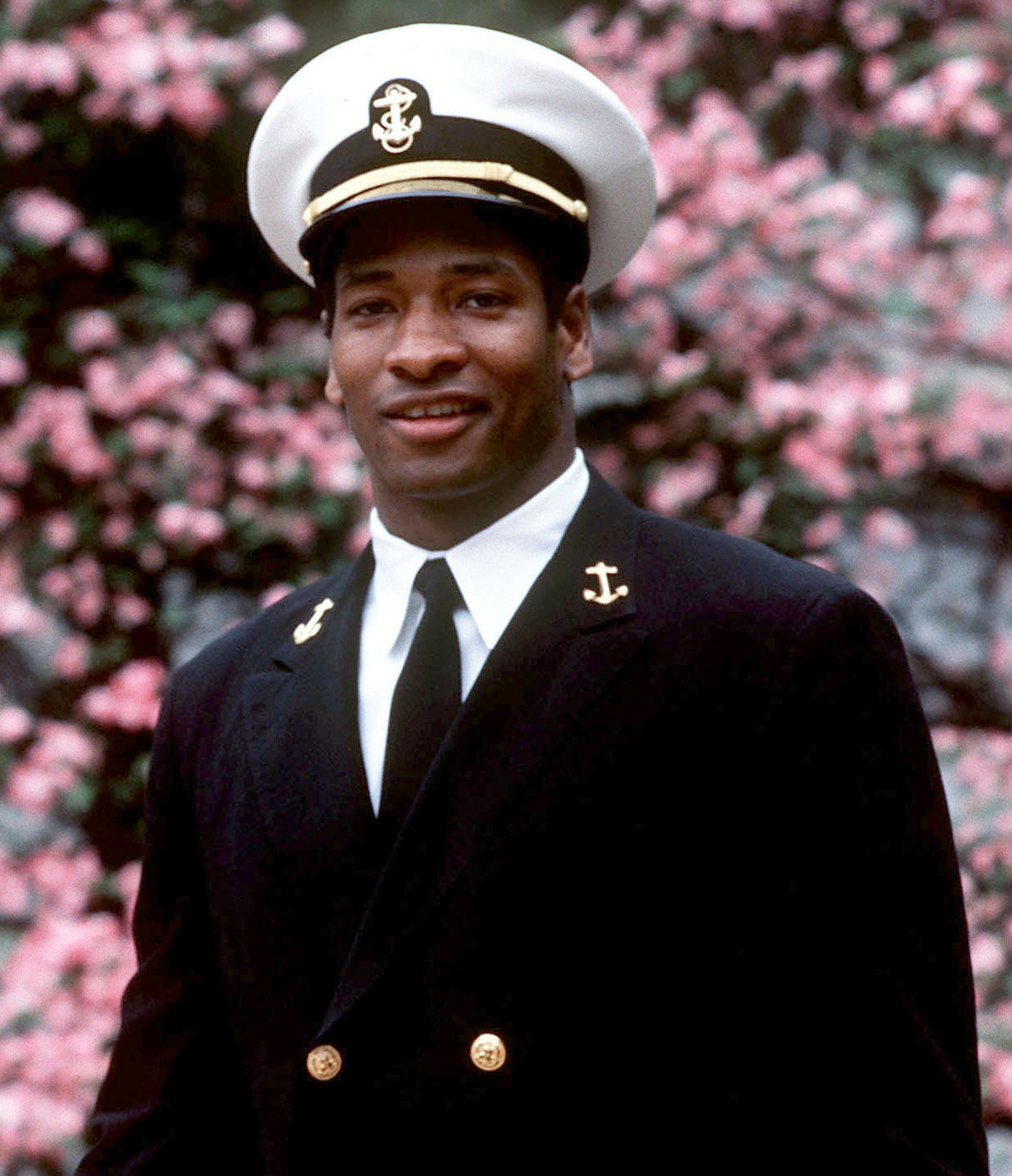
- McCallum in 1986

No. 34, 41
- Position: Running back

Personal information
- Born: October 6, 1963 (age 63); Jefferson City, Missouri, U.S.
- Listed height: 6 ft 2 in (1.88 m)
- Listed weight: 220 lb (100 kg)

Career information
- High school: Milford (Milford, Ohio)
- College: Navy (1981–1985)
- NFL draft: 1986: 4th round, 108th overall pick

Career history
- Los Angeles Raiders (1986); San Diego Chargers (1989); Los Angeles Raiders (1990–1994)

Awards and highlights
- 2× Consensus All-American (1983, 1985); First-team All-East (1983); Navy Midshipmen No. 30 retired

Career NFL statistics
- Rushing yards: 790
- Rushing average: 3.5
- Rushing touchdowns: 6
- Receptions: 17
- Receiving yards: 121
- Stats at Pro Football Reference
- College Football Hall of Fame

Napoleon Ardel McCallum (born October 6, 1963) is an American former professional football player who was a running back in the National Football League (NFL) for six seasons. McCallum played college football for the Navy Midshipmen, and then played in the NFL for the Los Angeles Raiders. He is a member of the College Football Hall of Fame.

== Early life ==
McCallum was born in Jefferson City, Missouri. The son of two teachers, he grew up in Lincoln Heights, a suburb of Cincinnati, Ohio, before the family moved to the suburb of Milford, Ohio. He attended Milford High School. As a senior for the Eagles, McCallum played both running back and defensive back. As a senior, he rushed for 1,625 yards, scored 17 touchdowns, and intercepted 12 passes. He was named third-team All-Ohio defensive back, all-Southwest Ohio and all-city.

== U.S. Naval Academy ==
McCallum had offers to play for major football powers including Syracuse, Tennessee and North Carolina State, but they all wanted him as a defensive back and not as a running back. He committed to attend the U.S. Naval Academy where he played football and was the star tailback, punt returner and kick returner. In the second game of his senior year, he suffered a season-ending injury to his ankle. McCallum was granted an additional season eligibility by the NCAA and the Naval Academy.

During his time at Navy, he was a two-time consensus All-American and set an NCAA record with 7,172 career all-purpose yards. He was also the career rushing leader at Navy with 4,179 yards until that record was broken by Keenan Reynolds in 2015. He was a member of the Navy Midshipmen football team that played in the Army-Navy game at the Rose Bowl stadium in Pasadena, California in 1983. He scored two touchdowns in Navy's 48–13 victory.

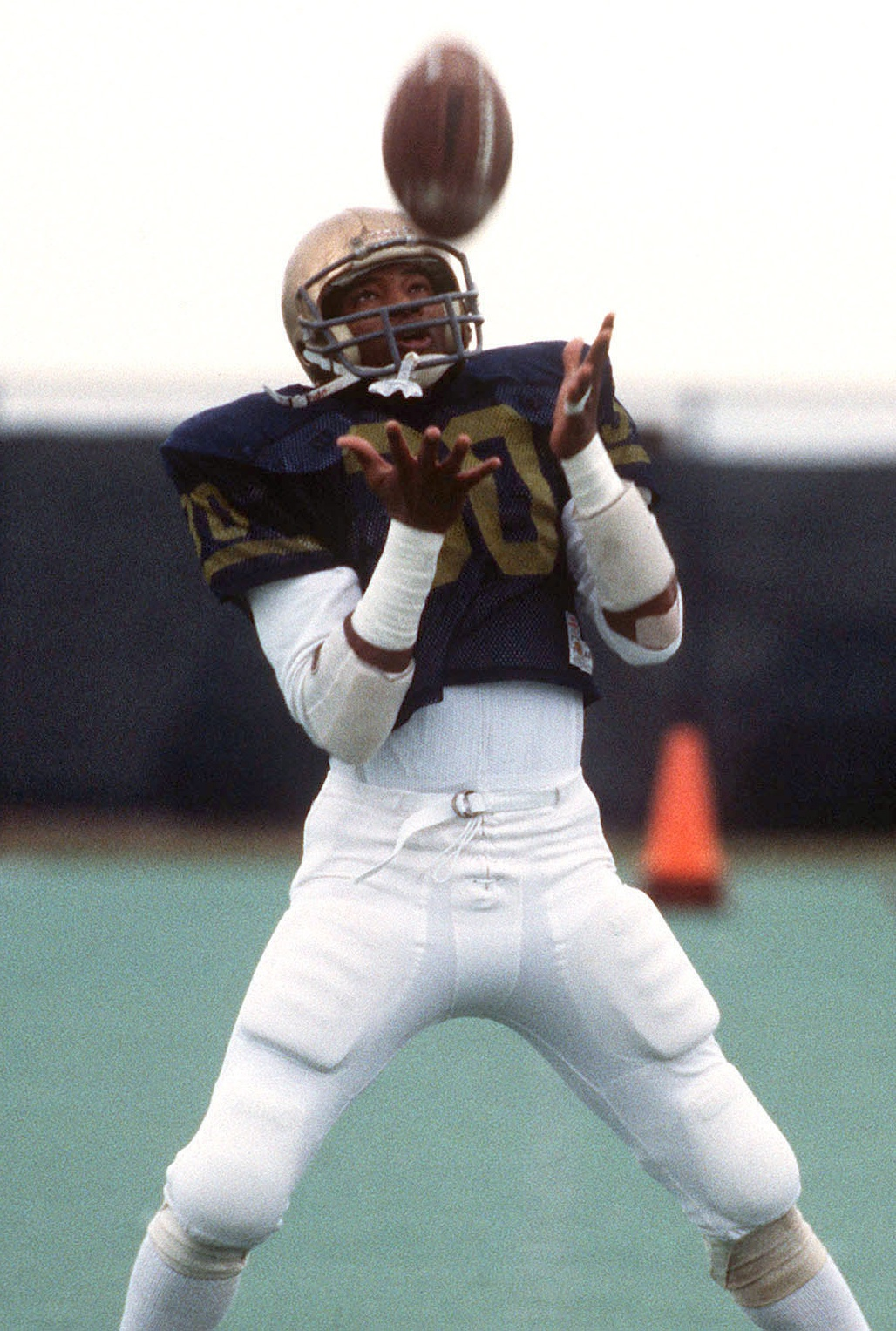
At practice

McCallum was a computer science major at the Naval Academy and as of 1986 held 16 football records there. He was inducted into the College Football Hall of Fame in 2003.

== College career statistics ==
Legend
**Bold**	Career high

Year	Team	Games	Rushing				Receiving			
Year	Team	GP	Att	Yds	Avg	TD	Rec	Yds	Avg	TD
1981	Navy	11	85	335	3.9	2	4	47	**11.8**	0
1982	Navy	11	165	739	4.5	5	20	196	9.8	0
1983	Navy	11	**331**	**1,587**	**4.8**	10	24	166	6.9	**1**
1984	Navy	2	40	191	**4.8**	0	4	29	7.3	0
1985	Navy	11	287	1,327	4.6	**14**	**44**	**358**	8.1	**1**
		55	908	4,179	4.6	31	96	796	8.3	2

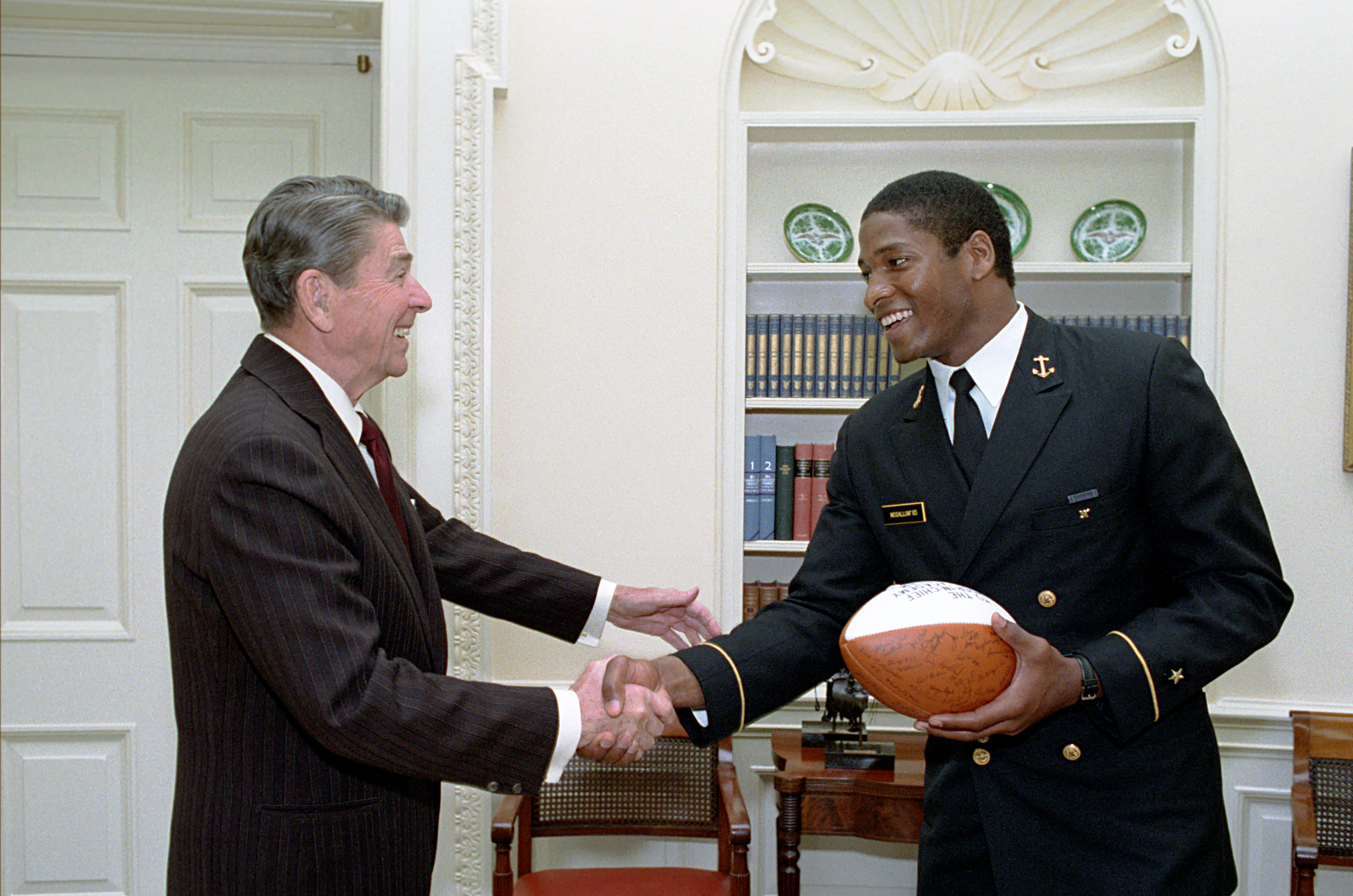
President Ronald Reagan with Napoleon McCallum during a photo opportunity in the Oval Office

== Professional career ==
After graduating in December 1985, McCallum stayed at the academy as a recruiter. In May, McCallum was selected in the 1986 USFL draft by the Baltimore Stars in the third round after a trade in the previous year with the San Antonio Gunslingers. In 1986 the Navy assigned him to USS Peleliu (LHA-5), home ported in Long Beach, California, near Los Angeles, as a supply officer. McCallum was selected by the Los Angeles Raiders in the fourth round of the 1986 NFL Draft. He played for the Los Angeles Raiders while on active duty that year; the military does not prohibit outside employment that does not interfere with service. He rushed for his season-high NFL totals with 536 yards while splitting playing time with incumbent Marcus Allen.

The Navy assigned McCallum in 1987 to USS California (CGN-36), home ported in Alameda, California and at that time sailing in the Indian Ocean, preventing him from returning to the NFL; McCallum believed that the Navy did so because of the attention he received from playing for the Raiders. After serving his duty with the Navy until 1990, McCallum rejoined the Raiders. His playing time was limited as he played special teams and as a short-yardage specialty back, as Marcus Allen was the more dominant running back at the time. In the 1993 playoffs, he rushed for 3 touchdowns in a wild-card victory over the Denver Broncos.

== Injury ==
On September 5, 1994, during a Monday Night Football contest and the Raiders' opening game of the season at the San Francisco 49ers, McCallum's career ended prematurely when 49ers linebacker Ken Norton Jr. twisted him to the ground. As Norton and McCallum went down, McCallum's left cleat stuck in the ground, forcing his knee into a horrible dislocation. Norton lay pinned underneath a motionless McCallum for a couple of minutes while athletic trainers attended to McCallum.

McCallum suffered a complete hyperextension of his left knee, almost to a right angle. He suffered a ruptured artery in his left knee, and tore three ligaments, tore the calf and hamstring from the bone, and suffered nerve damage in the knee. He initially thought he'd only face a lengthy rehab, but McCallum's surgeon told him that there was no chance of him ever being medically cleared to play again. The surgeon said that he normally didn't see leg injuries this severe except in car accidents. Had the subsequent surgery not gone as planned, there was a chance his left leg would have been amputated.

== After football ==
McCallum moved to Henderson, Nevada in 1996 and started a computer graphics business, Pro Digital Graphics. He is also an avid golfer. He later sold the business and is currently director of community development for the Las Vegas Sands Corp. He and his wife Yvonne have four daughters.

McCallum played a significant role in the Oakland Raiders relocation to Las Vegas by setting up a meeting in 2015 between Raiders owner Mark Davis and various officials in Las Vegas after approaching Davis about moving the team to Las Vegas before a Broncos-Raiders game on November 9, 2014, in Oakland. McCallum was the first to suggest meeting with UNLV about the idea. Previously, Las Vegas officials, notably Mayor Carolyn Goodman, had suggested building a stadium near Las Vegas Motor Speedway. He later set up a meeting at Las Vegas Sands between Davis and his boss Sheldon Adelson, who would later help Davis secure the public money needed to build Allegiant Stadium.
