= Tony Furjanic =

American football player (born 1964)

No. 53, 58
- Position: Linebacker

Personal information
- Born: February 26, 1964; Chicago, Illinois, U.S.
- Listed height: 6 ft 1 in (1.85 m)
- Listed weight: 228 lb (103 kg)

Career information
- High school: Mount Carmel (Chicago)
- College: Notre Dame
- NFL draft: 1986: 8th round, 220th overall pick

Career history
- Buffalo Bills (1986–1987); Miami Dolphins (1988)
- Stats at Pro Football Reference

Anthony Joseph Furjanic (born February 26, 1964) is an American former professional football player who played linebacker for three seasons for the Buffalo Bills and Miami Dolphins of the National Football League (NFL).
