= 1985–86 NCAA football bowl games =

Postseason tournament

- Season: 1985
- Number of bowls: 18
- Bowl games: December 14, 1985 – January 1, 1986
- National Championship: 1986 Orange Bowl
- Location of Championship: Miami Orange Bowl, Miami
- Champions: Oklahoma Sooners
Bowl record by conference
Conference	Bowls	Record	Number of teams in final AP poll
Big Ten	6	3–3 (0.500)	3
SEC	5	2–2–1 (0.500)	4
Pac-10	5	2–2–1 (0.500)	1
Independents	5	2–3 (0.400)	3
SWC	4	3–1 (0.750)	3
Big Eight	4	1–3 (0.250)	2
ACC	3	2–1 (0.667)	2
WAC	2	1–1 (0.500)	2
PCAA	1	1–0 (1.000)	0
MAC	1	0–1 (0.000)	0

The 1985–86 NCAA football bowl games were a series of post-season games played in December 1985 and January 1986 to end the 1985 NCAA Division I-A football season. A total of 18 team-competitive games, and two all-star games, were played. The post-season began with the California Bowl on December 14, 1985, and concluded on January 18, 1986, with the season-ending Senior Bowl.

== Schedule ==
Date	Game	Site	Time (US EST)	TV	Matchup (pre-game record)	AP pre-game rank	UPI (Coaches) pre-game rank
12/14	California Bowl	Bulldog Stadium; Fresno, California			Fresno State 51 (10–0–1) (PCAA Champion), Bowling Green 7 (11–0) (MAC Champion)	NR #20	#18; NR
12/21	Cherry Bowl	Pontiac Silverdome; Pontiac, Michigan		USA Network	Maryland 35 (8–3) (ACC Champion), Syracuse 18 (7–4) (Independent)	#20; NR	NR; NR
12/21	Independence Bowl	Independence Stadium; Shreveport, Louisiana		Mizlou	Minnesota 20 (6–5) (Big Ten), Clemson 13 (6–5) (ACC)	NR; NR	NR; NR
12/22	Holiday Bowl	Jack Murphy Stadium; San Diego, California		USA Network	Arkansas 18 (10–2) (SWC), Arizona State 17 (8–4) (Pac-10)	#14; NR	#12; NR
12/27	Liberty Bowl	Liberty Bowl Memorial Stadium; Memphis, Tennessee		Raycom	Baylor 21 (8–3) (SWC), LSU 7 (9–1–1) (SEC)	NR #12	NR #10
12/28	Sun Bowl	Sun Bowl; El Paso, Texas		CBS	Arizona 13 (8–3) (Pac-10), Georgia 13 (7–3–1) (SEC)	NR; NR	#20; NR
12/28	Aloha Bowl	Aloha Stadium; Honolulu, Hawaii			Alabama 24 (8–2–1) (SEC), USC 3 (6–5) (Pac-10)	#15; NR	#14; NR
12/28	Florida Citrus Bowl	Florida Citrus Bowl; Orlando, Florida		NBC	Ohio State 10 (8–3) (Big Ten), BYU 7 (11–2) (WAC Co-Champion)	#17 #9	#17 #9
12/30	Freedom Bowl	Anaheim Stadium; Anaheim, California		Lorimar	Washington 20 (6–5) (Pac-10), Colorado 17 (7–4) (Big Eight)	NR; NR	NR; NR
12/30	Gator Bowl	Gator Bowl Stadium; Jacksonville, Florida		ABC	Florida State 34 (8–3) (Independent), Oklahoma State 23 (8–3) (Big Eight)	#18 #19	#16 #19
12/31	Bluebonnet Bowl	Rice Stadium; Houston, Texas		Lorimar	Air Force 24 (11–1) (WAC Co-Champion), Texas 16 (8–3) (SWC)	#10; NR	#7; NR
12/31	Peach Bowl	Fulton County Stadium; Atlanta		CBS	Army 31 (8–3) (Independent), Illinois 29 (6–4–1) (Big Ten)	NR; NR	NR; NR
12/31	All-American Bowl	Legion Field; Birmingham, Alabama		WTBS	Georgia Tech 17 (8–2–1) (ACC), Michigan State 14 (7–4) (Big Ten)	NR; NR	NR; NR
1/1	Cotton Bowl Classic	Cotton Bowl; Dallas, Texas	1:30 PM	CBS	Texas A&M 36 (9–2) (SWC Champion), Auburn 16 (8–3) (SEC)	#11 #16	#11 #15
1/1	Fiesta Bowl	Sun Devil Stadium; Tempe, Arizona	1:30 PM	NBC	Michigan 27 (9–1–1) (Big Ten), Nebraska 23 (9–2) (Big Eight)	#5 #7	#5 #6
1/1	Rose Bowl	Rose Bowl; Pasadena, California	4:30 PM	NBC	UCLA 45 (8–2–1) (Pac-10 Champion), Iowa 28 (10–1) (Big Ten Champion)	#13 #4	#13 #3
1/1	Sugar Bowl	Louisiana Superdome; New Orleans, Louisiana	8:00 PM	ABC	Tennessee 35 (8–1–2) (SEC Champion), Miami (FL) 7 (10–1) (Independent)	#8 #2	#8 #4
1/1	Orange Bowl	Orange Bowl; Miami, Florida	8:00 PM	NBC	Oklahoma 25 (10–1) (Big Eight Champion), Penn State 10 (11–0) (Independent)	#3 #1	#2 #1
