= Air Force Falcons football =

College football team representing the United States Air Force Academy

| 2026 Air Force Falcons football team |
- First season: 1955; 71 years ago
- Athletic director: Nathan Pine
- Head coach: Troy Calhoun; 19th season, 139–97 (.589)
- Location: Air Force Academy, Colorado, U.S.
- Stadium: Falcon Stadium (capacity: 56,409)
- NCAA division: Division I FBS
- Conference: Mountain West
- Colors: Blue and silver
- All-time record: 442–357–13 (.552)
- Bowl record: 16–13–1 (.550)

Conference championships
- WAC: 1985, 1995, 1998

Division championships
- WAC Mountain: 1998 MW Mountain: 2015, 2021
- Consensus All-Americans: 5
- Rivalries: Army (rivalry); Colorado State (rivalry); Hawaii (rivalry); Navy (rivalry)

Uniforms
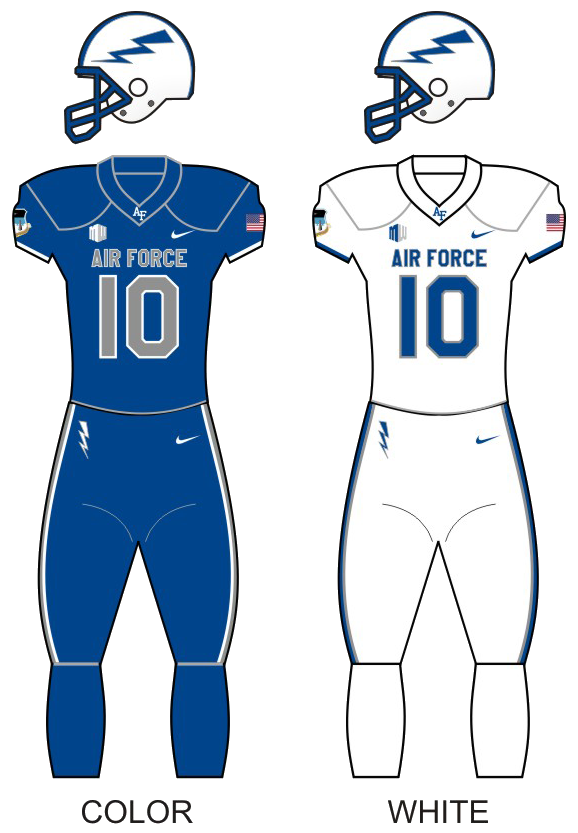
- Fight song: "Falcon Fight Song" (unofficial: "The U.S. Air Force")
- Mascot: The Bird
- Marching band: United States Air Force Academy Drum & Bugle Corp "The Flight of Sound"
- Outfitter: Nike
- Website: GoAirForceFalcons.com

The Air Force Falcons football program represents the United States Air Force Academy in college football at the NCAA Division I Football Bowl Subdivision (formerly Division I-A) level. Air Force has been a member of the Mountain West Conference since its founding in 1999. The Falcons play their home games at Falcon Stadium in Air Force Academy, Colorado, north of Colorado Springs. Troy Calhoun has been the team's head coach since 2007.

The three major service academies—Air Force, Army and Navy—compete for the Commander-in-Chief's Trophy which is awarded to the academy that defeats the others in football that year (or retained by the previous year's winner in the event of a three-way tie).

== History ==
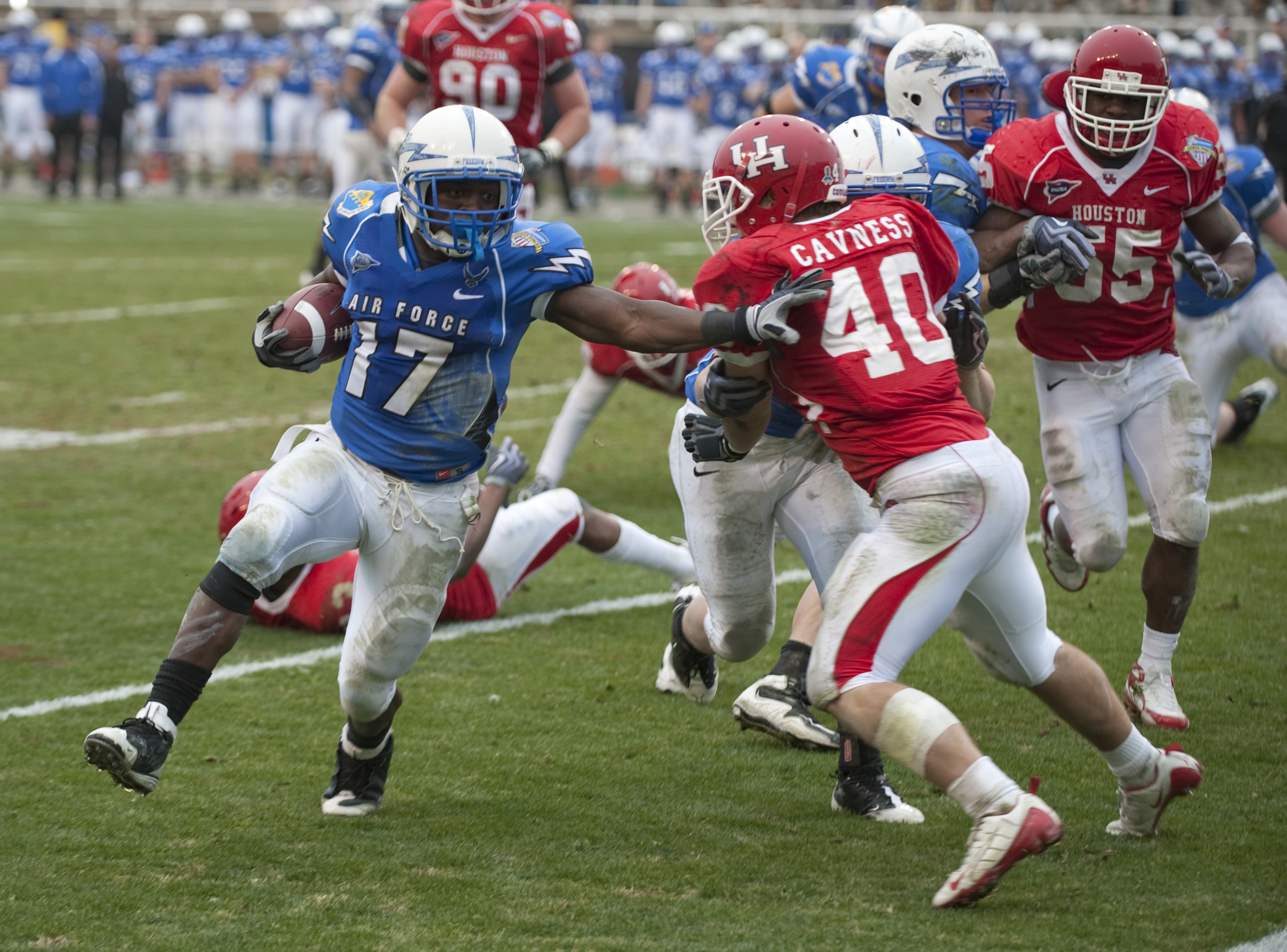
Running back Asher Clark and the Falcons take on the Houston Cougars during the 2009 Armed Forces Bowl

The Falcons are not only recognized by the lightning bolt on the side of their helmets, but their traditional option attack. Air Force is one of the premier rushing teams in the nation. Since Fisher DeBerry took over as Falcons head coach in 1984, they have ranked among the nation's top 10 in rushing 19 times in 21 years. The Air Force football team has enjoyed success not only on the field but also in the classroom. In 49 years of Air Force football, there have been 39 Academic All-Americans.

=== The 1985 season ===
1985 was the most successful season in Air Force football history. Under 5th-year coach Fisher DeBerry, the Falcons came within one win of playing for the national championship. They recorded 10 straight wins to start the season, climbed the polls to No. 2 in the nation, but lost to BYU 28–21 in the penultimate game of the regular season. Air Force rebounded with a bowl game win over Texas in the Bluebonnet Bowl and finished with a 12–1 record as the No. 5 ranked team in the nation.

== Conference affiliations ==
Air Force has been affiliated with the following conferences.

- Independent (1955–1979)
- Western Athletic Conference (1980–1998)
- Mountain West Conference (1999–present)

== Championships ==
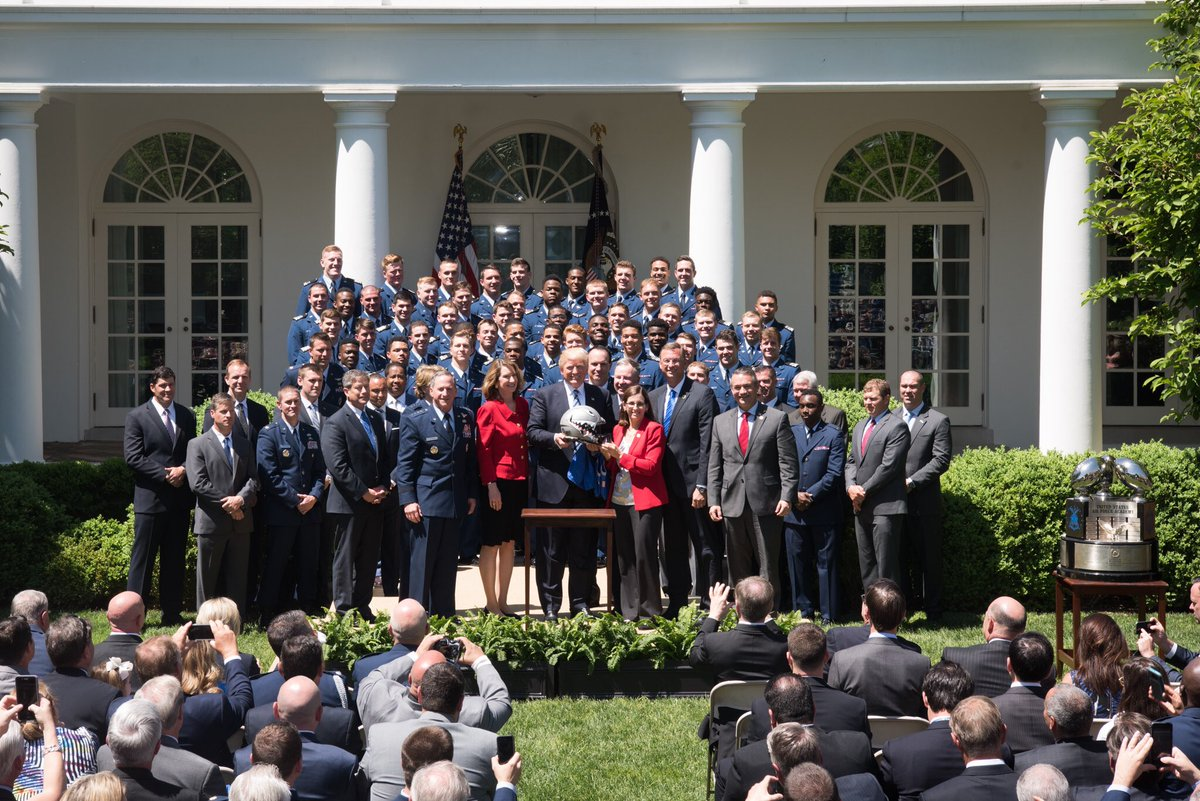
Presentation of the 2016 Commander in Chief's Trophy to the Air Force Falcons

=== Conference championships ===
| Year | Conference | Coach | Overall record | Conference record |
|---|---|---|---|---|
| 1985† | Western Athletic Conference | Fisher DeBerry | 12–1 | 7–1 |
| 1995† | Western Athletic Conference | Fisher DeBerry | 8–5 | 6–2 |
| 1998 | Western Athletic Conference | Fisher DeBerry | 12–1 | 7–1 |

† Co-champions

=== Division championships ===
| Year | Division | Coach | Opponent | CG result |
|---|---|---|---|---|
| 1998 | WAC - Mountain | Fisher DeBerry | BYU | W 20–13 |
| 2015 | MW - Mountain | Troy Calhoun | San Diego State | L 24–27 |
| 2021 | MW - Mountain | Troy Calhoun | N/A lost tie-breaker to Utah State | |

=== Conference Championship Game appearances ===
Air Force has appeared in 2 conference championship games in their history, winning 1 of them.

| Year | Conference | Coach | CG Opponent | CG Result | Game MVP |
|---|---|---|---|---|---|
| 1998 | WAC | Fisher DeBerry | BYU | W 20–13 | N/A |
| 2015 | Mountain West | Troy Calhoun | San Diego State | L 24–27 | Christian Chapman (QB, San Diego State); Na'im McGee (S, San Diego State) |

Note: Includes appearances where the conference did not use divisions to determine championship game participants.

== Bowl games ==
Air Force has played in 30 bowl games in their history, with a 16–13–1 (.550) record. Their highest finish in the polls was fifth (UPI coaches) in 1985.

| Season | Bowl | Opponent | Result | Head coach | Record |
|---|---|---|---|---|---|
| 1958 | Cotton | TCU | T 0–0 | Ben Martin | 9–0–2 |
| 1963 | Gator | North Carolina | L 0–35 | Ben Martin | 7–4 |
| 1970 | Sugar | Tennessee | L 13–34 | Ben Martin | 9–3 |
| 1982 | Hall of Fame | Vanderbilt | W 36–28 | Ken Hatfield | 8–5 |
| 1983 | Independence | Ole Miss | W 9–3 | Ken Hatfield | 10–2 |
| 1984 | Independence | Virginia Tech | W 23–7 | Fisher DeBerry | 8–4 |
| 1985 | Bluebonnet | Texas | W 24–16 | Fisher DeBerry | 12–1 |
| 1987 | Freedom | Arizona State | L 28–33 | Fisher DeBerry | 9–4 |
| 1989 | Liberty | Ole Miss | L 29–42 | Fisher DeBerry | 8–4–1 |
| 1990 | Liberty | Ohio State | W 23–11 | Fisher DeBerry | 7–5 |
| 1991 | Liberty | Mississippi State | W 31–15 | Fisher DeBerry | 10–3 |
| 1992 | Liberty | Ole Miss | L 0–13 | Fisher DeBerry | 7–5 |
| 1995 | Copper | Texas Tech | L 41–55 | Fisher DeBerry | 8–5 |
| 1997 | Las Vegas | Oregon | L 13–41 | Fisher DeBerry | 10–3 |
| 1998 | Oahu | Washington | W 43–25 | Fisher DeBerry | 12–1 |
| 2000 | Silicon Valley | Fresno State | W 37–34 | Fisher DeBerry | 9–3 |
| 2002 | San Francisco | Virginia Tech | L 13–20 | Fisher DeBerry | 8–5 |
| 2007 | Armed Forces | California | L 36–42 | Troy Calhoun | 9–4 |
| 2008 | Armed Forces | Houston | L 28–34 | Troy Calhoun | 8–5 |
| 2009 | Armed Forces | Houston | W 47–20 | Troy Calhoun | 8–5 |
| 2010 | Independence | Georgia Tech | W 14–7 | Troy Calhoun | 9–4 |
| 2011 | Military | Toledo | L 41–42 | Troy Calhoun | 7–6 |
| 2012 | Armed Forces | Rice | L 14–33 | Troy Calhoun | 6–7 |
| 2014 | Idaho Potato | Western Michigan | W 38–24 | Troy Calhoun | 10–3 |
| 2015 | Armed Forces | California | L 36–55 | Troy Calhoun | 8–6 |
| 2016 | Arizona | South Alabama | W 45–21 | Troy Calhoun | 10–3 |
| 2019 | Cheez-It | Washington State | W 31–21 | Troy Calhoun | 11–2 |
| 2021 | First Responder | Louisville | W 31–28 | Troy Calhoun | 10–3 |
| 2022 | Armed Forces | Baylor | W 30–15 | Troy Calhoun | 10–3 |
| 2023 | Armed Forces | James Madison | W 31–21 | Troy Calhoun | 9–4 |

== Head coaches ==
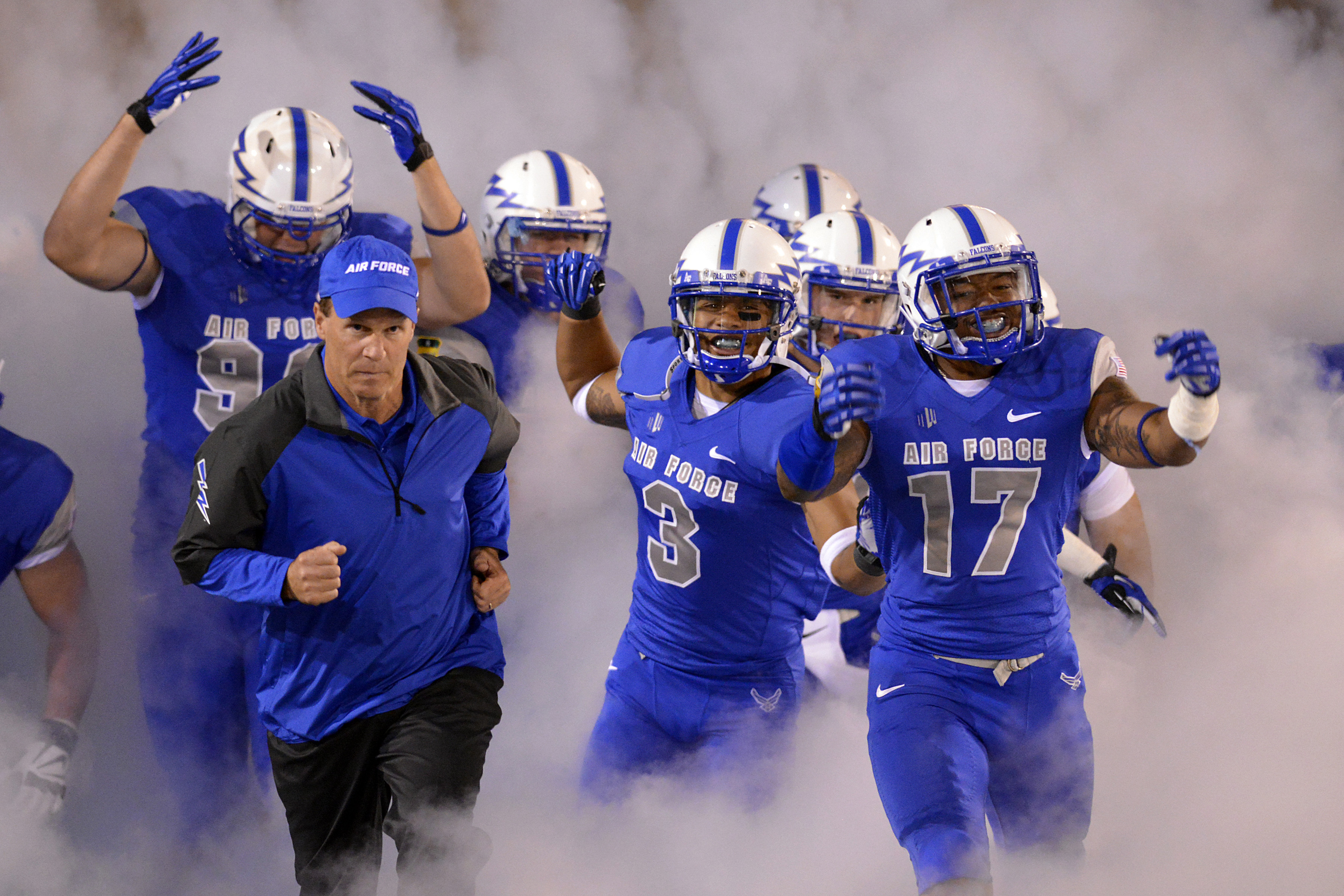
Head coach Troy Calhoun (left) leads the Falcons, which he has since the 2007 season

In over 60 years of play in college football, the Falcons have had seven head coaches.

| Tenure | Coach | Record | Pct. |
|---|---|---|---|
| 1955 | Robert V. Whitlow | 4–4 | .500 |
| 1956–1957 | Buck Shaw | 9–8–2 | .526 |
| 1958–1977 | Ben Martin | 96–103–9 | .483 |
| 1978 | Bill Parcells | 3–8 | .273 |
| 1979–1983 | Ken Hatfield | 26–32–1 | .449 |
| 1984–2006 | Fisher DeBerry | 169–107–1 | .612 |
| 2007–present | Troy Calhoun | 137–94 | .593 |

== Top 25 finishes ==
The Air Force Falcons have finished in the AP poll and/or the Coaches poll 8 times in the program's history, with the highest-ranked finishes being No. 6 in 1958 and No. 8 in 1985. Note: The AP poll began in 1936, and the Coaches' Poll began in 1950. Before 1990, only the top 20 teams were ranked in the AP poll before it was expanded to 25.

In addition to the major polls, the BCS produced rankings from 1998 to 2013 which helped select teams for the BCS Bowls. Then, starting in 2014, the CFP committee began issuing rankings to determine which teams were selected for the playoffs.

| Season | Overall record | Major polls | | Others | |
| Season | Overall record | AP poll | Coaches poll | BCS Standings (1998–2013) | CFP poll (2014–present) |
|---|---|---|---|---|---|
| 1958 | 9–0–1 | 6 | 8 | | |
| 1970 | 9–3 | 16 | 11 | | |
| 1983 | 10–2 | 13 | 15 | | |
| 1985 | 12–1 | 8 | 5 | | |
| 1991 | 10–3 | 25 | 24 | | |
| 1997 | 10–3 | | 25 | | |
| 1998 | 12–1 | 13 | 10 | | |
| 2019 | 11–2 | 22 | 23 | | |

== Falcon Stadium ==
Home games are played in Falcon Stadium, which sits below the main campus at an elevation of 6,621 feet (2,018 m) above sea level. Falcon Stadium is the 2nd highest stadium in the FBS division, with only Wyoming's stadium at a higher elevation. Pre-game activities include flyovers by USAF aircraft, including the F-15 and B-2. Opened in 1962, its highest attendance was 56,409 in 2002, when the Falcons hosted Notre Dame.

== Notable NFL Alumni ==
- Sid Abramowitz
- Shane Bonham
- Larry Cole
- Austin Cutting
- Bryce Fisher
- Ben Garland
- Ron George
- Chris Gizzi
- Garrett Griffin
- Chad Hall
- Chad Hennings
- Ernie Jennings
- Bill Line
- Beau Morgan
- Steve Russ
- Anthony Schlegel
- Jeff Smith
- Ted Sundquist
- Mark Simon

=== All-Americans ===
| Year | Player | Position | Award(s) |
|---|---|---|---|
| 1956 | Larry Thomson | FB | Little America (3rd) |
| 1958 | Brock Strom | OL | Consensus |
| 1958 | Robert Brickey | HB | Helms |
| 1963 | Terry Isaacson | QB | Helms |
| 1963 | Joe Rodwell | C | Helms |
| 1966 | Neal Starkey | DB | Playboy Magazine All-American |
| 1967 | Neal Starkey | DB | Associated Press (3rd) |
| 1969 | Ernie Jennings | WR | Central Press (2nd) |
| 1970 | Ernie Jennings | WR | Consensus |
| 1971 | Orderia Mitchell | C | Black Sports |
| 1971 | Gene Ogilvie | DE | UPI (3rd) |
| 1972 | Orderia Mitchell | C | Associated Press (2nd), Gridiron (2nd) |
| 1972 | Gene Ogilvie | DE | UPI (2nd) |
| 1973 | Steve Heil | ROV | Associated Press (3rd) |
| 1974 | Dave Lawson | LB/K | Football Writers |
| 1975 | Dave Lawson | LB/K | UPI (2nd), Football News (2nd) |
| 1981 | Johnny Jackson | DB | Associated Press (2nd) |
| 1982 | Dave Schreck | OG | Associated Press (2nd) |
| 1983 | John Kershner | FB | Football News (2nd) |
| 1983 | Mike Kirby | WR | Sporting News (2nd) |
| 1985 | Mark Simon | P | Scripps Howard, Associated Press (2nd) |
| 1985 | Scott Thomas | DB | Consensus, Walter Camp, Kodak, Football Writes, Associated Press (2nd) |
| 1986 | Terry Maki | LB | Kodak, Football News (2nd), Associated Press (3rd) |
| 1986 | Tom Rotello | DB | Football News (2nd) |
| 1987 | Chad Hennings | DT | Consensus, Walter Camp, Kodak, Football Writers, Associated Press, UPI, Scripps Howard, Sporting News, Football News, Outland Trophy winner |
| 1989 | Dee Dowis | QB | Heisman Trophy finalist |
| 1989 | Ron Gray | KR | Associated Press (3rd) |
| 1991 | Jason Christ | P | Associated Press (2nd), Football News (3rd) |
| 1992 | Carlton McDonald | DB | Consensus, Walter Camp, Kodak, Football Writers, Associated Press, UPI, Scripps Howard, Sporting News |
| 1993 | Chris MacInnis | P/K | UPI, Associated Press (2nd) |
| 1996 | Beau Morgan | QB | Associated Press (3rd) |
| 1998 | Chris Gizzi | LB | Associated Press (3rd), Football Writers (2nd) |
| 1998 | Tim Curry | DB | Sporting News (3rd) |
| 1998 | Frank Mindrup | OL | American Football Foundation (3rd) |
| 2001 | Anthony Schlegel | ILB | Sporting News (Freshmen 3rd team) |
| 2002 | Brett Huyser | OL | Sporting News (4th) |
| 2007 | Chad Hall | WR | Rivals (3rd), Sports Illustrated |
| 2007 | Carson Bird | CB | Sports Illustrated |
| 2008 | Ryan Harrison | K | College Football News |
| 2010 | Reggie Rembert | DB | AFCA (1st), Associated Press (3rd) |

=== Academic All–Americans ===
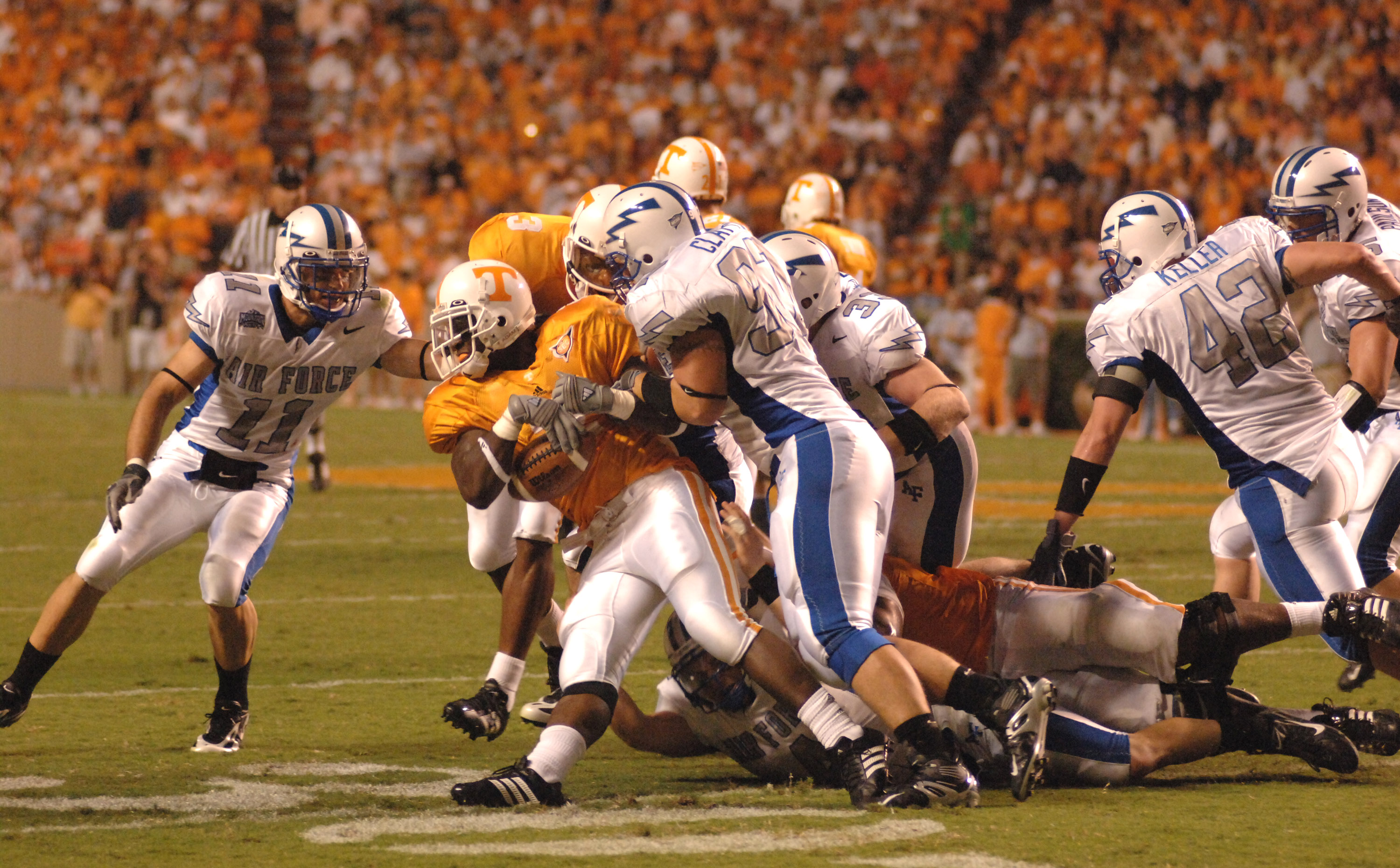
Air Force Academy Falcons free safety Bobby Giannini (#11) prepares to finish off Tennessee tailback Montario Hardesty, while Falcons defensive end Josh Clayton (#97) loosens Hardesty's grip on the football. The Falcons lost 31–30 in 2006.

Academic All–Americans at Air Force.

| Year | Player | Position |
|---|---|---|
| 1958 | Brock Strom | OT |
| 1959 | Rich Mayo | QB |
| 1960 | Rich Mayo | QB |
| 1960 | Don Baucom | HB |
| 1967 | Ken Zagzebski | MG |
| 1967 | Carl Janssen | OE |
| 1969 | Ernie Jennings | WR |
| 1970 | Ernie Jennings | WR |
| 1970 | Bob Parker | QB |
| 1970 | Phil Bauman | LB |
| 1971 | Darryl Haas | LB/P |
| 1971 | Bob Homburg | DE |
| 1971 | John Griffith | DT |
| 1972 | Gene Ogilvie | DE |
| 1972 | Bob Homburg | DE |
| 1972 | Mark Prill | MG |
| 1973 | Joe Debes | OT |
| 1976 | Steve Hoog | WR |
| 1977 | Mack McCollum | ROV |
| 1978 | Steve Hoog | WR |
| 1978 | Tom Foertsch | LB |
| 1978 | Tim Fyda | DE |
| 1981 | Mike France | LB |
| 1981 | Kevin Ewing | ROV |
| 1982 | Jeff Kubiak | P |
| 1983 | Jeff Kubiak | P |
| 1987 | Chad Hennings | DT |
| 1987 | Scott Salmon | DB |
| 1987 | James Hecker | DB |
| 1988 | Scott Salmon | DB |
| 1988 | David Hlatky | OL |
| 1988 | James Hecker | DB |
| 1989 | Chris Howard | HB |
| 1990 | Chris Howard | HB |
| 1990 | J.T. Tokish | LB |
| 1992 | Grant Johnson | LB |
| 1996 | Dustin Tyner | WR |
| 1996 | Rashad Penton | DB |
| 1997 | Rashad Penton | DB |
| 1998 | Rashad Penton | DB |
| 2003 | Ryan Carter | DE |
| 2004 | Ryan Carter | DE |
| 2018 | Garrett Kauppila | DB |

== Rivals ==
=== Commander-in-Chief's Trophy ===
Air Force has a traditional rivalry against the other two FBS service academies, Army and Navy; the three play for the right to hold the Commander-in-Chief's Trophy. Air Force has won the trophy 21 times, more than either Army or Navy.

- Commander in Chief's Trophy Winners (AF-Army-Navy): 1982, 1983, 1985, 1987, 1989–1992, 1994, 1995, 1997–2002, 2010, 2011, 2014, 2016, 2022.

=== Colorado State ===
Air Force has played more games against Colorado State and Wyoming than any other school, having played each school 60 times since 1957, the Falcons' first season.

Since 1980, the Falcons and Colorado State Rams have competed for the Ram–Falcon Trophy. Air Force holds a 27–15 advantage over Colorado State in games that the trophy has been contested in.

=== Colorado ===
In 2019 Air Force renewed a rivalry with Colorado, winning at Folsom Field on Sept. 14 by a score of 30–23. The teams had not played since Oct. 5, 1974, a game that Colorado won by a score of 28–27. Air Force won the first meeting between the teams in 1958. The 1963 game between the two college football teams was postponed due to the assassination of President John F. Kennedy. The 1973 game, the last one played in Boulder before the 2019 clash, was marred by a riot. Fans threw eggs and beer at Air Force personnel and cadets.

=== Hawaii ===
The Kuter Trophy is awarded to the winner of the game between Air Force and Hawaii. The trophy is named after General Laurence S. Kuter, who was appointed the first head of the Pacific Air Forces Command (located at Hickam Air Force Base in Honolulu) in 1957. The two teams have met 23 times, with Air Force leading the series 14–8–1.

=== Top 10 rivals ===
Below are Air Force's records against its top ten most-played opponents since 1957.

| Opponent | Games | Wins | Losses | Ties | Pct. | Last meeting |
|---|---|---|---|---|---|---|
| Colorado State | 63 | 40 | 22 | 1 | .643 | Nov 28, 2025 (W 42–21) |
| Wyoming | 63 | 32 | 28 | 3 | .532 | Oct 18, 2025 (W 24–21) |
| Army | 60 | 38 | 21 | 1 | .642 | Nov 1, 2025 (L 17-20) |
| Navy | 58 | 34 | 24 | 0 | .586 | Oct 4, 2025 (L 31–34) |
| New Mexico | 42 | 26 | 16 | 0 | .619 | Nov 22, 2025 (L 3–20) |
| San Diego State | 40 | 22 | 18 | 0 | .550 | Nov 30, 2024 (W 31–20) |
| BYU | 30 | 7 | 23 | 0 | .233 | Sep 11, 2010 (W 35–14) |
| Notre Dame | 30 | 6 | 24 | 0 | .200 | Oct 26, 2013 (L 10–45) |
| Utah | 27 | 14 | 13 | 0 | .519 | Oct 30, 2010 (L 23–28) |
| UNLV | 26 | 18 | 8 | 0 | .692 | Oct 11, 2025 (L 48–51) |

== Future non-conference opponents ==
Announced schedules as of February 6, 2025.

| 2026 | 2027 | 2028 | 2029 | 2030 | 2031 | 2032 | 2033 | 2034 | 2035 | 2036 | 2037 |
|---|---|---|---|---|---|---|---|---|---|---|---|
| Duquesne | Lafayette | at UTSA | at Arizona | Navy | Arizona | UTSA | Army | Navy | Army | Navy | Army |
| Navy | Baylor | Navy | Army | at Army | Army | Navy | at Navy | at Army | at Navy | at Army | at Navy |
| UConn | at Navy | at Army | at Navy | | at Navy | at Army | | | | | |
| at Army | Army | | | | | | | | | | |
