= 1985 Hawaii Rainbow Warriors football team =

American college football season

1985 Hawaii Rainbow Warriors football
- Conference: Western Athletic Conference
- Record: 4–6–2 (4–3–1 WAC)
- Head coach: Dick Tomey (9th season)
- Home stadium: Aloha Stadium

1985 Western Athletic Conference football standings
	Conf.					Overall
Team	W		L		T	W		L		T
No. 8 Air Force +	7	–	1	–	0	12	–	1	–	0
No. 16 BYU +	7	–	1	–	0	11	–	3	–	0
Utah	5	–	3	–	0	8	–	4	–	0
Hawaii	4	–	3	–	1	4	–	6	–	2
Colorado State	4	–	4	–	0	5	–	7	–	0
San Diego State	3	–	4	–	1	5	–	6	–	1
New Mexico	2	–	6	–	0	3	–	8	–	0
Wyoming	2	–	6	–	0	3	–	8	–	0
UTEP	1	–	7	–	0	1	–	10	–	0
+ – Conference co-champions; Rankings from AP Poll

The 1985 Hawaii Rainbow Warriors football team represented the University of Hawaiʻi at Mānoa in the Western Athletic Conference during the 1985 NCAA Division I-A football season. In their ninth season under head coach Dick Tomey, the Rainbow Warriors compiled a 4–6–2 record.

== Schedule ==
Date	Opponent	Site	Result	Attendance	Source
August 31	Kansas*	Aloha Stadium; Halawa, HI	L 27–33	46,626	
September 14	Utah	Aloha Stadium; Halawa, HI	L 27–29	46,591	
September 21	Long Beach State*	Aloha Stadium; Halawa, HI	L 30–33	43,076	
October 5	at Fresno State*	Bulldog Stadium; Fresno, CA (rivalry)	T 24–24	29,676	
October 12	at Wyoming	War Memorial Stadium; Laramie, WY (rivalry)	W 26–18	14,433	
October 19	Pacific (CA)*	Aloha Stadium; Halawa, HI	L 15–24	41,500	
October 26	at New Mexico	University Stadium; Albuquerque, NM	W 27–17	19,111	
November 2	Colorado State^{†}	Aloha Stadium; Halawa, HI	W 34–14	43,451	
November 9	at UTEP	Sun Bowl; El Paso, TX	W 23–7	12,910	
November 23	No. 10 Air Force	Aloha Stadium; Halawa, HI (rivalry)	L 20–27	50,000	
November 30	San Diego State	Aloha Stadium; Halawa, HI	T 10–10	40,316	
December 7	No. 9 BYU	Aloha Stadium; Halawa, HI	L 6–26	47,482	
*Non-conference game; ^{†}Homecoming; Rankings from Coaches' Poll released prior to the game

== Personnel ==
1985 Hawaii Warriors football team roster
Players
Coaches
Offense

Pos.	#	Name	Class

Defense

Pos.	#	Name	Class
LB		M. L. Johnson	Jr
DL		Al Noga	So

Special teams

Pos.	#	Name	Class

Head coach

- Dick Tomey

Coordinators/assistant coaches

Legend

- (C) Team captain
- (S) Suspended
- (I) Ineligible
- Injured
- Redshirt
