= 1985 Houston Cougars football team =

American college football season

1985 Houston Cougars football
- Conference: Southwest Conference
- Record: 4–7 (3–5 SWC)
- Head coach: Bill Yeoman (24th season)
- Defensive coordinator: Don Todd (14th season)
- Captains: Todd Schoppe; T. J. Turner
- Home stadium: Houston Astrodome

1985 Southwest Conference football standings
	Conf.					Overall
Team	W		L		T	W		L		T
No. 6 Texas A&M $	7	–	1	–	0	10	–	2	–	0
No. 12 Arkansas	6	–	2	–	0	10	–	2	–	0
No. 17 Baylor	6	–	2	–	0	9	–	3	–	0
Texas	6	–	2	–	0	8	–	4	–	0
SMU	5	–	3	–	0	6	–	5	–	0
Houston	3	–	5	–	0	4	–	7	–	0
Rice	2	–	6	–	0	3	–	8	–	0
Texas Tech	1	–	7	–	0	4	–	7	–	0
TCU	0	–	8	–	0	3	–	8	–	0
$ – Conference champion; Rankings from AP Poll

The 1985 Houston Cougars football team represented the University of Houston during the 1985 NCAA Division I-A football season. The Cougars were led by 24th-year head coach Bill Yeoman and played their home games at the Astrodome in Houston, Texas. The team competed as members of the Southwest Conference, finishing in sixth. Houston finished the season with a record of 4–7.

== Schedule ==
Date	Opponent	Site	TV	Result	Attendance	Source
September 7	at Tulsa*	Skelly Stadium; Tulsa, OK		L 24–31	28,156	
September 21	Washington*	Houston Astrodome; Houston, TX		L 12–29	20,522	
September 28	at Louisville*	Cardinal Stadium; Louisville, KY		W 49–27	30,334	
October 5	No. 19 Baylor	Houston Astrodome; Houston, TX (rivalry)	HSE	L 21–24	25,787	
October 12	at Texas A&M	Kyle Field; College Station, TX		L 16–43	55,711	
October 19	SMU^{†}	Houston Astrodome; Houston, TX (rivalry)	HSE	L 13–37	21,761	
October 26	at No. 14 Arkansas	War Memorial Stadium; Little Rock, AR	USA	L 27–57	53,860	
November 2	at TCU	Amon G. Carter Stadium; Fort Worth, TX		W 26–21	19,854	
November 9	Texas	Houston Astrodome; Houston, TX	Raycom	L 24–34	35,821	
November 23	Texas Tech	Houston Astrodome; Houston, TX (rivalry)		W 17–16	14,280	
November 30	at Rice	Rice Stadium; Houston, TX (rivalry)		W 24–20	16,492	
*Non-conference game; ^{†}Homecoming; Rankings from AP Poll released prior to the game

== Roster ==
1985 Houston Cougars football team roster
Players			Coaches
Offense: Pos. / # / Name / Class; TE / 84 / Carl Hilton / Sr	Defense: Pos. / # / Name / Class; DT / 95 / T. J. Turner / Sr	Special teams: Pos. / # / Name / Class	Head coach: Bill Yeoman; Coordinators/assistant coaches Legend: (C) Team captain; (S) Suspended; (I) Ineligible; Injured; Redshirt
