= 1985 Air Force Falcons football team =

American college football season

1985 Air Force Falcons football
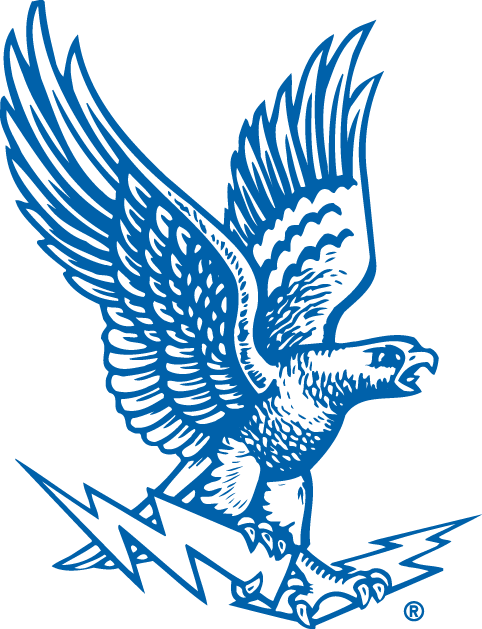

WAC co-champion Bluebonnet Bowl champion

Bluebonnet Bowl, W 24–16 vs. Texas
- Conference: Western Athletic Conference

Ranking
- Coaches: No. 5
- AP: No. 8
- Record: 12–1 (7–1 WAC)
- Head coach: Fisher DeBerry (2nd season)
- Offensive scheme: Wishbone triple option
- Captain: All seniors
- Home stadium: Falcon Stadium

1985 Western Athletic Conference football standings
	Conf.					Overall
Team	W		L		T	W		L		T
No. 8 Air Force +	7	–	1	–	0	12	–	1	–	0
No. 16 BYU +	7	–	1	–	0	11	–	3	–	0
Utah	5	–	3	–	0	8	–	4	–	0
Hawaii	4	–	3	–	1	4	–	6	–	2
Colorado State	4	–	4	–	0	5	–	7	–	0
San Diego State	3	–	4	–	1	5	–	6	–	1
New Mexico	2	–	6	–	0	3	–	8	–	0
Wyoming	2	–	6	–	0	3	–	8	–	0
UTEP	1	–	7	–	0	1	–	10	–	0
+ – Conference co-champions; Rankings from AP Poll

The 1985 Air Force Falcons football team represented the United States Air Force Academy as a member of the Western Athletic Conference (WAC) during the 1985 NCAA Division I-A football season. Led by second-year head coach Fisher DeBerry, the Falcons compiled an overall record of 12–1 with a mark of 7–1 in conference play, sharing the WAC title with BYU. After beating the Texas in the Bluebonnet Bowl, the Air Force was ranked No 8 in the final AP poll.

== Schedule ==
Date	Opponent	Rank	Site	TV	Result	Attendance	Source
August 31	UTEP		Falcon Stadium; Colorado Springs, CO		W 48–6	38,500	
September 14	at Wyoming		War Memorial Stadium; Laramie, WY		W 49–7	29,134	
September 21	Rice*		Falcon Stadium; Colorado Springs, CO		W 59–17	33,868	
September 28	at New Mexico	No. 19	University Stadium; Albuquerque, NM		W 49–12	27,124	
October 5	Notre Dame*	No. 17	Falcon Stadium; Colorado Springs, CO (rivalry)	ABC	W 21–15	52,153	
October 12	at Navy*	No. 13	Navy–Marine Corps Memorial Stadium; Annapolis, MD		W 24–7	35,663	
October 19	at Colorado State	No. 10	Hughes Stadium; Fort Collins, CO (rivalry)		W 35–19	31,127	
October 26	Utah	No. 8	Falcon Stadium; Colorado Springs, CO		W 37–15	32,269	
November 2	San Diego State	No. 7	Falcon Stadium; Colorado Springs, CO		W 31–10	36,503	
November 9	Army*	No. 5	Falcon Stadium; Colorado Springs, CO		W 45–7	51,103	
November 16	at No. 16 BYU	No. 4	Cougar Stadium; Provo, UT		L 21–28	65,393	
November 23	at Hawaii	No. 13	Aloha Stadium; Halawa, HI (rivalry)	Prime	W 27–20	50,000	
December 31	vs. Texas*	No. 10	Rice Stadium; Houston, TX (Bluebonnet Bowl)	LSN	W 24–16	42,000	
*Non-conference game; Rankings from AP Poll released prior to the game

== Rankings ==
Ranking movements Legend: ██ Increase in ranking ██ Decrease in ranking — = Not ranked ( ) = First-place votes
	Week																
Poll	Pre	1	2	3	4	5	6	7	8	9	10	11	12	13	14	15	Final
AP	—	—	—	—	19	17	13	10	8	7	5	4	13	11	10	10	8
Coaches Poll	—	—	—	—	18	15	12	9	6	6	4 (2)	4 (3)	10	7	8	7	5

== Game summaries ==
=== Army ===
Army Cadets (7–1) at #5 Air Force Falcons (9–0)

Quarter	1	2	3	4	Total
Army	0	0	0	7	7
Air Force	7	7	14	7	35

at Falcon Stadium • Colorado Springs, Colorado

- Date: November 9
- Game attendance: 52,103

Game information

Army

- Rob Healy
  4/7, 18 Yds
- Clarence Jones
  7 Rush, 39 Yds, TD
- Doug Black
  1 Rec, 10 Yds

Air Force

- Bart Weiss
  4/9, 105 Yds, TD
  19 Rush, 114 Yds, 2 TD
- Ken Carpenter
  3 Rec, 93 Yds, TD

Scoring summary

Quarter	Time	Drive			Team	Scoring information	Score	
Quarter	Time	Plays	Yards	TOP	Team	Scoring information	ARMY	AFA
1					Air Force	Greg Pshsniak 1-yard touchdown run, Tomislav Ruby kick good	0	7
2					Air Force	Ken Carpenter 64-yard touchdown reception from Bart Weiss, Tomislav Ruby kick good	0	14
3					Air Force	Bart Weiss 54-yard touchdown run, Tomislav Ruby kick good	0	21
3					Air Force	Bart Weiss 1-yard touchdown run, Tomislav Ruby kick good	0	28
4					Air Force	22-yard field goal by Tomislav Ruby	0	31
4					Army	Clarence Jones 7-yard touchdown run, Craig Stopa kick good	7	31
4					Air Force	Chris Vellanti 57-yard touchdown run, Tomislav Ruby kick good	7	38
4					Air Force	Marc Munafo 1-yard touchdown run, Tomislav Ruby kick good	7	45
"TOP" = time of possession. For other American football terms, see Glossary of American football.							7	45

=== At BYU ===
#4 Air Force Falcons (10–0) at #16 BYU Cougars (8–2)

Quarter	1	2	3	4	Total
Air Force	14	7	0	0	21
BYU	0	7	14	7	28

at Cougar Stadium, Provo, Utah

- Date: November 16, 1985
- Game weather: Cloudy, 35 °F (2 °C)
- Game attendance: 65,393
- Box Score

Game information

First quarter

- AFA – Randy Jones 22-yard pass from Bart Weiss (Tom Ruby kick). Air Force 7–0.
- AFA – Tom Rotello 25-yard interception return (Tom Ruby kick). Air Force 14–0.

Second quarter

- BYU – Mark Bellini 22-yard pass from Robbie Bosco (Gary Webster kick). Air Force 14–7.
- AFA – Dwan Wilson 58-yard interception return (Tom Ruby kick). Air Force 21–7.

Third quarter

- BYU – Vai Sikahema 72-yard punt return (kick failed). Air Force 21–13.
- BYU – Mark Bellini 25-yard pass from Robbie Bosco (pass good). Tie 21–21.

Fourth quarter

- BYU – Vai Sikahema 69-yard pass from Robbie Bosco (Gary Webster kick). BYU 28–21.

Top passers

- AFA – Bart Weiss – 9/18, 101 yards, TD, INT
- BYU – Robbie Bosco – 29/49, 343 yards, 3 TD, 4 INT

Top rushers

- AFA – Pat Evans – 18 rushes, 65 yards
- BYU – Tom Tuipulotu – 3 rushes, 15 yards

Top receivers

- AFA – Randy Jones – 2 receptions, 25 yards, TD
- BYU – Mark Bellini – 9 receptions, 143 yards, 2 TD

== Roster ==
1985 Air Force Falcons football team roster
Players
Coaches
Offense

Pos.	#	Name	Class
WR		Hugh Brennan
QB		Troy Calhoun	Fr
WR	83	Ken Carpenter	Sr
RB		Pat Evans
WR	1	Tyrone Jeffcoat	Jr
QB	6	Brian Knorr	Sr
RB		Marc Munafo
RB		Greg Pshsniak
RB		Kelly Pittman
FB	38	Mark Simon	Jr
RB		Chris Vellanti
QB	4	Bart Weiss	Sr

Defense

Pos.	#	Name	Class
LB	60	Mike Chandler	Sr
NG	52	Dick Clark	Sr
LB		Brady Glick
DT	85	Chad Hennings	So
LB		Terry Maki	Jr
LB	48	Pat Malackowski	Jr
CB		Tom Rotello	Jr
DB		A. J. Scott
S	29	Scott Thomas	Sr
DB	23	Rod Vernon	Sr
DT	74	John Ziegler	Sr

Special teams

Pos.	#	Name	Class
K		Tom Ruby
P		Mark Simon

Head coach

- Fisher DeBerry

Coordinators/assistant coaches

Legend

- (C) Team captain
- (S) Suspended
- (I) Ineligible
- Injured
- Redshirt

== Awards and honors ==
- Pat Malackowski, Bullard Award

== Team players in the NFL ==
- Sophomore Chad Hennings' rookie season in the NFL was in 1992 with the Dallas Cowboys.
