= 1985 TCU Horned Frogs football team =

American college football season

1985 TCU Horned Frogs football
- Conference: Southwest Conference
- Record: 3–8 (0–8 SWC)
- Head coach: Jim Wacker (3rd season)
- Defensive coordinator: Tom Mueller (3rd season)
- Home stadium: Amon G. Carter Stadium

1985 Southwest Conference football standings
| | Conf. | | | | | Overall |
| Team | W | | L | | T | W | | L | | T |
|---|---|---|---|---|---|---|---|---|---|---|
| No. 6 Texas A&M $ | 7 | – | 1 | – | 0 | 10 | – | 2 | – | 0 |
| No. 12 Arkansas | 6 | – | 2 | – | 0 | 10 | – | 2 | – | 0 |
| No. 17 Baylor | 6 | – | 2 | – | 0 | 9 | – | 3 | – | 0 |
| Texas | 6 | – | 2 | – | 0 | 8 | – | 4 | – | 0 |
| SMU | 5 | – | 3 | – | 0 | 6 | – | 5 | – | 0 |
| Houston | 3 | – | 5 | – | 0 | 4 | – | 7 | – | 0 |
| Rice | 2 | – | 6 | – | 0 | 3 | – | 8 | – | 0 |
| Texas Tech | 1 | – | 7 | – | 0 | 4 | – | 7 | – | 0 |
| TCU | 0 | – | 8 | – | 0 | 3 | – | 8 | – | 0 |
$ – Conference champion; Rankings from AP Poll

The 1985 TCU Horned Frogs football team represented Texas Christian University (TCU) in the 1985 NCAA Division I-A football season. The Horned Frogs finished the season 3–8 overall and 0–8 in the Southwest Conference. The team was coached by Jim Wacker, in his third year as head coach. The Frogs played their home games in Amon G. Carter Stadium, which is located on campus in Fort Worth, Texas.

== Schedule ==
| Date | Opponent | Site | Result | Attendance | Source |
|---|---|---|---|---|---|
| September 14 | Tulane* | Amon G. Carter Stadium; Fort Worth, TX | W 30–13 | 31,512 | |
| September 21 | at Kansas State* | KSU Stadium; Manhattan, KS | W 24–22 | 15,500 | |
| September 28 | No. 6 SMU | Amon G. Carter Stadium; Fort Worth, TX (rivalry) | L 21–56 | 42,414 | |
| October 5 | No. 10 Arkansas | Amon G. Carter Stadium; Fort Worth, TX | L 0–41 | 40,112 | |
| October 12 | at Rice | Rice Stadium; Houston, TX | L 27–34 | 10,000 | |
| October 19 | North Texas State* | Amon G. Carter Stadium; Fort Worth, TX | W 14–10 | 19,914 | |
| October 26 | at No. 13 Baylor | Baylor Stadium; Waco, TX (rivalry) | L 0–45 | 42,500 | |
| November 2 | Houston | Amon G. Carter Stadium; Fort Worth, TX | L 21–26 | 19,854 | |
| November 9 | at Texas Tech | Jones Stadium; Lubbock, TX (rivalry) | L 7–63 | 33,536 | |
| November 16 | at Texas | Texas Memorial Stadium; Austin, TX (rivalry) | L 0–20 | 66,397 | |
| November 23 | No. 19 Texas A&M | Amon G. Carter Stadium; Fort Worth, TX (rivalry) | L 6–53 | 38,782 | |
*Non-conference game; Rankings from AP Poll released prior to the game
