= 1985 Arkansas Razorbacks football team =

American college football season

1985 Arkansas Razorbacks football

Holiday Bowl champion

Holiday Bowl, W 18–17 vs. Arizona State
- Conference: Southwest Conference

Ranking
- Coaches: No. 12
- AP: No. 12
- Record: 10–2 (6–2 SWC)
- Head coach: Ken Hatfield (2nd season)
- Offensive scheme: Option
- Defensive coordinator: Fred Goldsmith (2nd season)
- Captains: David Bazzel; Greg Lasker; Nick Miller; Andy Upchurch
- Home stadium: Razorback Stadium; War Memorial Stadium

1985 Southwest Conference football standings
	Conf.					Overall
Team	W		L		T	W		L		T
No. 6 Texas A&M $	7	–	1	–	0	10	–	2	–	0
No. 12 Arkansas	6	–	2	–	0	10	–	2	–	0
No. 17 Baylor	6	–	2	–	0	9	–	3	–	0
Texas	6	–	2	–	0	8	–	4	–	0
SMU	5	–	3	–	0	6	–	5	–	0
Houston	3	–	5	–	0	4	–	7	–	0
Rice	2	–	6	–	0	3	–	8	–	0
Texas Tech	1	–	7	–	0	4	–	7	–	0
TCU	0	–	8	–	0	3	–	8	–	0
$ – Conference champion; Rankings from AP Poll

The 1985 Arkansas Razorbacks football team represented the University of Arkansas as a member of the Southwest Conference (SWC) during the 1985 NCAA Division I-A football season. Led by second-year head coach Ken Hatfield, the Razorbacks compiled an overall record of 10–2 with a mark of 6–2 in conference play, placing in a three-way tie for second in the SWC. Arkansas was invited to the Holiday Bowl, where the Razorbacks defeated Arizona State. The team played home games at Razorback Stadium in Fayetteville, Arkansas and War Memorial Stadium in Little Rock, Arkansas.

Arkansas ranked eighth in the nation with 265.6 rushing yards per game. On defense, the Hogs gave up only 11.7 points per game, the sixth-best in college football. Arkansas lost two games by a total of six points. In a 15–13 home loss to Texas, the Longhorns made all five of their field goal attempts, while Arkansas missed two of four. Razorback punt returner B. J. Edmonds finished ninth in college football with 11.6 yards per return.

The victory in the Holiday Bowl would be the only bowl game win during Hatfield's tenure as head coach, from 1984 to 1989. The Razorbacks did not win another bowl game until the 1999 season.

== Schedule ==
Date	Opponent	Rank	Site	TV	Result	Attendance	Source
September 14	at Ole Miss*	No. 14	Mississippi Veterans Memorial Stadium; Jackson, MS (rivalry)		W 24–19	52,110	
September 21	Tulsa*	No. 14	War Memorial Stadium; Little Rock, AR		W 24–0	55,112	
September 28	New Mexico State*	No. 10	War Memorial Stadium; Little Rock, AR		W 45–13	54,984	
October 5	at TCU	No. 10	Amon G. Carter Stadium; Fort Worth, TX	Raycom	W 41–0	40,112	
October 12	at Texas Tech	No. 6	Jones Stadium; Lubbock, TX (rivalry)		W 30–7	38,464	
October 19	Texas	No. 4	Razorback Stadium; Fayetteville, AR (rivalry)	ABC	L 13–15	53,212	
October 26	Houston	No. 14	War Memorial Stadium; Little Rock, AR	Raycom	W 57–27	53,860	
November 2	at Rice	No. 14	Rice Stadium; Houston, TX		W 30–15	13,976	
November 9	No. 11 Baylor	No. 12	War Memorial Stadium; Little Rock, AR	ABC	W 20–14	54,684	
November 16	at Texas A&M	No. 9	Kyle Field; College Station, TX (rivalry)	ESPN	L 6–10	58,632	
November 23	SMU	No. 18	Razorback Stadium; Fayetteville, AR		W 15–9	51,644	
December 22	vs. Arizona State*	No. 14	Jack Murphy Stadium; San Diego, CA (Holiday Bowl)	Lorimar, USA	W 18–17	50,641	
*Non-conference game; Rankings from AP Poll released prior to the game
