= 1985 Texas Tech Red Raiders football team =

American college football season

1985 Texas Tech Red Raiders football
- Conference: Southwest Conference
- Record: 4–7 (1–7 SWC)
- Head coach: Jerry Moore (5th season)
- Offensive coordinator: Tom Wilson (2nd season)
- Offensive scheme: I formation
- Defensive coordinator: Spike Dykes (2nd season)
- Base defense: 4–3
- Home stadium: Jones Stadium

1985 Southwest Conference football standings
	Conf.					Overall
Team	W		L		T	W		L		T
No. 6 Texas A&M $	7	–	1	–	0	10	–	2	–	0
No. 12 Arkansas	6	–	2	–	0	10	–	2	–	0
No. 17 Baylor	6	–	2	–	0	9	–	3	–	0
Texas	6	–	2	–	0	8	–	4	–	0
SMU	5	–	3	–	0	6	–	5	–	0
Houston	3	–	5	–	0	4	–	7	–	0
Rice	2	–	6	–	0	3	–	8	–	0
Texas Tech	1	–	7	–	0	4	–	7	–	0
TCU	0	–	8	–	0	3	–	8	–	0
$ – Conference champion; Rankings from AP Poll

The 1985 Texas Tech Red Raiders football team represented Texas Tech University as a member of the Southwest Conference (SWC) during the 1985 NCAA Division I-A football season. In their fifth and final season under head coach Jerry Moore, the Red Raiders compiled a 4–7 record (1–7 against SWC opponents), outscored opponents by a combined total of 249 to 240 (largely on the strength of a 63-7 victory over TCU), and finished in eighth place in the conference. The team played its home games at Clifford B. and Audrey Jones Stadium in Lubbock, Texas.

== Schedule ==
Date	Opponent	Site	TV	Result	Attendance	Source
September 7	New Mexico*	Jones Stadium; Lubbock, TX		W 32–31	35,118	
September 14	at Tulsa*	Skelly Stadium; Tulsa, OK		W 21–17	29,972	
September 21	North Texas State*	Jones Stadium; Lubbock, TX		W 28–7	33,494	
September 28	at Baylor	Baylor Stadium; Waco, TX (rivalry)	Raycom	L 0–31	36,500	
October 5	Texas A&M	Jones Stadium; Lubbock, TX (rivalry)		L 27–28	50,148	
October 12	No. 6 Arkansas	Jones Stadium; Lubbock, TX (rivalry)		L 7–30	38,464	
October 19	Rice	Jones Stadium; Lubbock, TX		L 27–29	28,194	
November 2	at Texas	Texas Memorial Stadium; Austin, TX (rivalry)	Raycom	L 21–34	65,137	
November 9	TCU^{†}	Jones Stadium; Lubbock, TX (rivalry)		W 63–7	33,536	
November 16	at SMU	Texas Stadium; Irving, TX	Raycom	L 7–9	29,476	
November 23	at Houston	Houston Astrodome; Houston, TX (rivalry)		L 16–17	14,280	
*Non-conference game; ^{†}Homecoming; Rankings from AP Poll released prior to the game
