= 1985 Rice Owls football team =

American college football season

1985 Rice Owls football
- Conference: Southwest Conference
- Record: 3–8 (2–6 SWC)
- Head coach: Watson Brown (2nd season)
- Defensive coordinator: Dick Hopkins (2nd season)
- Home stadium: Rice Stadium

1985 Southwest Conference football standings
	Conf.					Overall
Team	W		L		T	W		L		T
No. 6 Texas A&M $	7	–	1	–	0	10	–	2	–	0
No. 12 Arkansas	6	–	2	–	0	10	–	2	–	0
No. 17 Baylor	6	–	2	–	0	9	–	3	–	0
Texas	6	–	2	–	0	8	–	4	–	0
SMU	5	–	3	–	0	6	–	5	–	0
Houston	3	–	5	–	0	4	–	7	–	0
Rice	2	–	6	–	0	3	–	8	–	0
Texas Tech	1	–	7	–	0	4	–	7	–	0
TCU	0	–	8	–	0	3	–	8	–	0
$ – Conference champion; Rankings from AP Poll

The 1985 Rice Owls football team was an American football team that represented Rice University in the Southwest Conference during the 1985 NCAA Division I-A football season. In their second year under head coach Watson Brown, the team compiled a 3–8 record.

== Schedule ==
Date	Opponent	Site	Result	Attendance	Source
September 14	Miami (FL)*	Rice Stadium; Houston, TX	L 20–48	15,411	
September 21	at Air Force*	Falcon Stadium; Colorado Springs, CO	L 17–59	33,868	
September 28	Lamar*	Rice Stadium; Houston, TX	W 29–28	9,038	
October 5	at No. 20 Texas	Texas Memorial Stadium; Austin, TX (rivalry)	L 16–44	69,471	
October 12	TCU	Rice Stadium; Houston, TX	W 34–27	10,000	
October 19	at Texas Tech	Jones Stadium; Lubbock, TX	W 29–27	28,194	
October 26	Texas A&M	Rice Stadium; Houston, TX	L 28–43	41,195	
November 2	No. 14 Arkansas	Rice Stadium; Houston, TX	L 15–30	13,976	
November 9	at SMU	Texas Stadium; Irving, TX (rivalry)	L 15–40	20,014	
November 16	at No. 17 Baylor	Baylor Stadium; Waco, TX	L 10–34	30,250	
November 30	Houston	Rice Stadium; Houston, TX (rivalry)	L 20–24	16,492	
*Non-conference game; Rankings from AP Poll released prior to the game

== Roster ==
1985 Rice Owls football team roster
Players			Coaches
Offense: Pos. / # / Name / Class	Defense: Pos. / # / Name / Class	Special teams: Pos. / # / Name / Class; K / 10 / James Hamrick / Sr	Head coach: Watson Brown; Coordinators/assistant coaches Legend: (C) Team captain; (S) Suspended; (I) Ineligible; Injured; Redshirt
