= 1985 SMU Mustangs football team =

American college football season

1985 SMU Mustangs football
- Conference: Southwest Conference
- Record: 6–5 (5–3 SWC)
- Head coach: Bobby Collins (4th season)
- Offensive scheme: No-huddle option
- Defensive coordinator: Bill Clay (4th season)
- Base defense: 3–4
- Home stadium: Texas Stadium

1985 Southwest Conference football standings
	Conf.					Overall
Team	W		L		T	W		L		T
No. 6 Texas A&M $	7	–	1	–	0	10	–	2	–	0
No. 12 Arkansas	6	–	2	–	0	10	–	2	–	0
No. 17 Baylor	6	–	2	–	0	9	–	3	–	0
Texas	6	–	2	–	0	8	–	4	–	0
SMU	5	–	3	–	0	6	–	5	–	0
Houston	3	–	5	–	0	4	–	7	–	0
Rice	2	–	6	–	0	3	–	8	–	0
Texas Tech	1	–	7	–	0	4	–	7	–	0
TCU	0	–	8	–	0	3	–	8	–	0
$ – Conference champion; Rankings from AP Poll

The 1985 SMU Mustangs football team represented Southern Methodist University (SMU) as a member of the Southwest Conference (SWC) during the 1985 NCAA Division I-A football season. Led by fourth-year head coach Bobby Collins, the Mustangs compiled an overall record 6–5 with a mark of 5–3 in conference play, placing fifth in the SWC.

Running back Reggie Dupard was honored as a first-team All-American by the Football Writers Association of America, and Jerry Ball was selected to the third-team by the Associated Press.

== Schedule ==
Date	Opponent	Rank	Site	Result	Attendance	Source
September 7	UTEP*	No. 3	Texas Stadium; Irving, TX	W 35–23	24,611	
September 28	at TCU	No. 6	Amon G. Carter Stadium; Fort Worth, TX (rivalry)	W 56–21	42,414	
October 5	at Arizona*	No. 3	Arizona Stadium; Tucson, AZ	L 6–28	52,114	
October 12	No. 19 Baylor	No. 16	Texas Stadium; Irving, TX	L 14–21	42,112	
October 19	at Houston		Houston Astrodome; Houston, TX (rivalry)	W 37–13	21,761	
October 26	No. 19 Texas		Texas Stadium; Irving, Texas	W 44–14	56,874	
November 2	at Texas A&M	No. 20	Kyle Field; College Station, TX	L 17–19	54,597	
November 9	Rice		Texas Stadium; Irving, TX (rivalry)	W 40–15	20,014	
November 16	Texas Tech		Texas Stadium; Irving, TX	W 9–7	29,476	
November 23	at No. 18 Arkansas		Razorback Stadium; Fayetteville, AR	L 9–15	51,644	
December 7	at No. 4 Oklahoma*		Oklahoma Memorial Stadium; Norman, OK	L 13–35	73,284	
*Non-conference game; Rankings from AP Poll released prior to the game
