= 1985 Bluebonnet Bowl =

Air Force Falcons	Texas Longhorns
(11–1)	(8–3)
24	16
Head coach: Fisher DeBerry	Head coach: Fred Akers
AP / Coaches; 10 / 7
	1	2	3	4	Total
Air Force	14	0	7	3	24
Texas	7	0	3	6	16
- Date: December 31, 1985
- Season: 1985
- Stadium: Rice Stadium
- Location: Houston, Texas
- MVP: Pat Evans, FB, Air Force
- Favorite: Air Force by 6
- Referee: Courtney Mauzy (ACC)
- Attendance: 42,000

United States TV coverage
- Network: Lorimar Sports Network
- Announcers: Tom Hammond; Gifford Nielsen

The 1985 Bluebonnet Bowl was a college football postseason bowl game between the Texas Longhorns and Air Force Falcons, played on December 31 at Rice Stadium in Houston, Texas.

== Background ==
The Falcons ran the wishbone offense and had the most regular season victories in program history with eleven, but a conference loss to defending national champion BYU at Provo on November 16 cost them a shot at the national title and an outright Western Athletic Conference (WAC) title. This was the fourth consecutive bowl appearance for Air Force, the previous three were victories. Unranked Texas tied for second in the Southwest Conference (SWC) but had lost to rival Texas A&M to end the regular season; it was their ninth straight bowl appearance and first Bluebonnet Bowl in five years.

This Bluebonnet Bowl was the first at Rice Stadium since 1967; the previous seventeen editions (1968–1984) were at the Astrodome. Nearly a dozen years earlier, Rice Stadium hosted Super Bowl VIII (January 1974).

Kickoff was at 1:45 pm CST.

== Game summary ==
- Texas – Harris 34 pass from Stafford (Ward kick), 11:14 remaining
- Air Force – Pshsniak 1 run (Ruby kick), 3:37 remaining
- Air Force – Weiss 1 run (Ruby kick), 1:38 remaining
- Texas – Ward 24 FG, 6:19 remaining
- Air Force – Evans 19 run (Ruby kick), 3:35 remaining
- Texas – Ward 31 FG, 14:14 remaining
- Texas – Ward 28 FG, 7:34 remaining
- Air Force – Ruby 40 FG, :43 remaining

Air Force fullback Pat Evans had 18 carries for 129 yards in an MVP effort.

== Statistics ==
Statistics	Air Force	Texas
First downs	17	14
Rushes	53	49
Rushing yards	189	214
Passes	1–5	9–18
Passing yards	5	88
Punts–average	11–49.2	6–44.5
Fumbles–lost	1–0	0–0
Interceptions	0	2
Penalties–yards	6–45	8–67

== Aftermath ==
The Falcons (12–1) finished in the top ten in both major polls (fifth in Coaches, eighth in AP), which remains their highest ranking ever. Texas (8–4) lost its fourth straight bowl and did not make a bowl game the following season (at 5–6), and head coach Fred Akers was soon fired.
