= 1985 Florida Citrus Bowl =

American college football game

1985 Florida Citrus Growers Association Florida Citrus Bowl
BYU Cougars	Ohio State Buckeyes
(11–2)	(8–3)
WAC	Big Ten
7	10
Head coach: LaVell Edwards	Head coach: Earle Bruce
AP / Coaches; 9 / 9	AP / Coaches; 17 / 17
	1	2	3	4	Total
BYU	0	7	0	0	7
Ohio State	0	3	7	0	10
- Date: December 28, 1985
- Season: 1985
- Stadium: Florida Citrus Bowl
- Location: Orlando, Florida
- Referee: Vincent Price (CIFOA)
- Attendance: 50,920

United States TV coverage
- Network: NBC
- Announcers: Jay Randolph, Dave Rowe and Tom Hammond

The 1985 Florida Citrus Bowl was the 40th edition held of the Citrus Bowl. It featured the BYU Cougars and the Ohio State Buckeyes.

== Background ==
Both teams were ranked coming into the Citrus Bowl, with BYU playing in their eighth consecutive bowl game. The Cougars appeared in nine more before the streak ended in 1994. Ohio State was playing their second bowl game in 1985, having played in the 1985 Rose Bowl, in their 14th consecutive bowl season, that streak that ended in 1987. Robbie Bosco had 338 of 511 passes for 4,273 yards and 30 touchdowns for BYU, and finished third in Heisman Trophy voting. The game was to be predicted to be high scoring affair.

== Game summary ==
The game was anything but high scoring for the offense. BYU lead at halftime 7–3 after Robbie Bosco threw a touchdown pass to David Miles. Ohio State's offense could only muster a field goal by Rich Spangler late in the half. But it was in the third quarter when the game turned around for Ohio State. BYU was deep in their own territory at the 11-yard line when Bosco threw an interception to Larry Kolic, who returned it 14 yards for a touchdown and a 10–7 lead. BYU had three chances to rally in the fourth quarter, but were stopped each time. Their last drive went 50 yards (in 46 seconds), but with 10 seconds remaining, Bosco threw his fourth interception of the day, this time to Terry White. Bosco went 26 for 50 with only 261 yards in a game that saw eight combined turnovers.

The game was also known for an acrobatic sideline catch by Ohio State receiver Cris Carter caught a ball, one-handed, on a pass quarterback Jim Karsatos was meaning to throw away with 10:27 remaining in the 4th quarter. Karsatos has claimed that catch by Carter was the greatest in the history of college football: "When I finally saw it on film, he was tiptoeing the sidelines and he jumped up and caught the ball left-handed by the point of the football at least a yard out of bounds. Then he somehow levitated back in bounds to get both his feet in bounds. I swear to this day he actually levitated to get back in bounds. When I saw it on film, it just blew me away."

== Statistics ==
Statistics	BYU	Ohio State
First downs	19	20
Yards rushing	88	133
Yards passing	261	196
Return yards	51	26
Total yards	400	355
Punts-Average	7-45	8-39
Fumbles-Lost	3-2	2-2
Interceptions	4	0
Penalties-Yards	6-54	10-61
Time of Possession	27:50	32:10

== See also ==
- Citrus Bowl
- 1985 BYU Cougars football team
- 1985 Ohio State Buckeyes football team
- 1985–86 NCAA football bowl games
- List of Ohio State Buckeyes bowl games
- BYU Cougars football
