= College Football on USA =

Television series

College Football on USA refers to the USA Network's cable television coverage of the college football regular season. USA's coverage ran from 1980 to 1986.

== History ==
USA Network began airing college football in 1980. From 1980 to 1982), USA would broadcast several games per week. These games were sourced from regional and national syndicators like Raycom, Mizlou, and Katz. These broadcasts were shown on a tape delayed basis as much as two days later. For USA's final four seasons (1983-1986), they narrowed their coverage to only one game a week. Initially, the games were selected from virtually every conference. However, in the later years, USA would frequently (but not exclusively) air games involving Pittsburgh, Penn State, Notre Dame, Boston College Maryland and the Big Eight Conference. During this time, USA Network broadcast several bowl games, including: the 1981 Liberty Bowl, 1985 Cherry Bowl, 1985 Holiday Bowl, 1985 Freedom Bowl, 1985 Independence Bowl, 1985 Bluebonnet Bowl, 1986 Independence Bowl, 1986 Peach Bowl.

=== Under NBC Sports ===
During the 2020 season, USA Network broadcast all or part of two Notre Dame Fighting Irish football games as part of NBC Sports' rights to the team's home games. The first of these games was a September 19, 2020 game against South Florida, which had been shifted to the network due to NBC's acquisition of rights to the 2020 U.S. Open. The broadcast was co-produced with the school's in-house media unit Fighting Irish Media.

On November 7, 2020, a portion of Notre Dame's primetime double-overtime game against Clemson was preempted by NBC to USA Network due to NBC News coverage of a victory speech by president-elect Joe Biden.

=== Under USA Sports: 2026–2030 ===
With the divestment of USA Network and other NBCUniversal cable networks to the new company Versant, the company established its own USA Sports division to acquire sports properties for USA Network and Golf Channel. On November 15, 2025, the reconstructed Pac-12 Conference announced an agreement to air 22 football games on USA Network from 2026 through 2030; the broadcasts will be produced by the conference's media department Pac-12 Enterprises.

== Commentators ==
=== Play-by-play ===
- Nate Gatter
- Ted Robinson
- Guy Haberman

=== Color commentary ===
- Ryan Leaf
- Darius Walker
- Alex Brink

=== Sideline reporters ===
- Lauren Green
- Dalen Cuff
- Kate Harrison

=== Studio ===
- Lisa Kerney - Studio Host
- Erik Coleman - Studio Analyst
- Darius Walker - Studio Analyst

=== Play-by-play ===
- Eddie Doucette
- Harry Kalas
- Ray Lane
- Barry Tompkins

=== Color commentary ===
- John Beasley
- Jim Brandstatter
- Jeff Logan
- Kyle Rote, Jr.
- Joe Theismann

=== Sideline reporters ===
- Johnny Holliday
