= 1985 Liberty Bowl =

- 27th Liberty Bowl
LSU Tigers	Baylor Bears
(9–1–1)	(8–3)
SEC	SWC
7	21
Head coach: Bill Arnsparger	Head coach: Grant Teaff
AP / Coaches; 12 / 10
	1	2	3	4	Total
LSU	7	0	0	0	7
Baylor	7	3	3	8	21
- Date: December 27, 1985
- Season: 1985
- Stadium: Liberty Bowl Memorial Stadium
- Location: Memphis, Tennessee
- MVP: Baylor QB Cody Carlson
- Referee: Otho Kortz (Big Ten)
- Attendance: 40,186

United States TV coverage
- Network: Raycom Sports
- Announcers: Merle Harmon, Bud Wilkinson and Kevin Kiley

The 1985 Liberty Bowl was a postseason college football bowl game held on December 27, 1985, in Memphis, Tennessee, at Liberty Bowl Memorial Stadium. The 27th edition of the Liberty Bowl featured the Baylor Bears of the Southwest Conference (SWC) and the LSU Tigers of the Southeastern Conference (SEC). Baylor won the game, 21–7.

LSU entered the game with a 9–1–1 overall record and 4–1–1 conference record, led by head coach Bill Arnsparger. Baylor entered the game with an 8–3 overall record and 6–2 conference record, led by head coach Grant Teaff.

== Game summary ==
Cody Carlson, the Baylor quarterback, tossed scoring passes of 5 and 15 yards to lead the Bears to a 21–7 win. The Tigers' only score came on a Liberty Bowl-record 79-yard punt return by Norman Jefferson.

Baylor overcame the 7–0 deficit to lead 10–7 at the half. Baylor raised their lead to 13–7 in the third quarter on a 35-yard field goal by Syler, but missed a chance to increase their lead to 9 points later in the period when Syler was wide right on a 37-yard attempt.

With Baylor clinging to a 13–7 edge, Carlson, who alternated with Tom Muecke at quarterback for the Bears, capped a 62-yard fourth-quarter march with a 15-yard scoring strike to the split end John Simpson. Carlson then found Matt Clark alone in the end zone with a two-point conversion pass as the Bears took command, 21–7.

== Scoring summary ==
Quarter	Team	Scoring summary	Score	
Quarter	Team	Scoring summary	LSU	Baylor
1	LSU	Norman Jefferson 79-yard punt return, Lewis kick good	7	0
1	Baylor	Matt Clark 5-yard touchdown pass, Syler kick good	7	7
2	Baylor	Syler 23-yard field goal	7	10
3	Baylor	Syler 35-yard field goal	7	13
4	Baylor	John Simpson 15-yard touchdown reception from Cody Carlson, Matt Clark two-point conversion pass good	7	21
			7	21

== Statistical summary ==
Team Statistics

(Rushing-Passing-Total): BU - 215–274–489; LSU - 91–101–192.

Individual Statistical Leaders

Rushing (Att.-Yds.-TD): BU - Perry 7–25–0, Rutledge 10–36–0; LSU - Dalton Hillard 20–66–0, Garry James 7–23–0

Passing (Att.-Comp.-Int.-TD-Yds.): BU - Cody Carlson 12-9-0-2-161, Tom Muecke 18-9-0-0-113; LSU - Jeff Wickersham 24-11-0-1-95, Mickey Guidry 3-2-0-0-6.

Receiving (No.-Yds.-TD): BU - John Simpson 3–117–1, Matt Clark 3–31–1; LSU - Garry James 4–25–0, Jean-Batiste 2–23–0.
