= 1985 Baylor Bears football team =

American college football season

1985 Baylor Bears football

Liberty Bowl champion

Liberty Bowl, W 21–7 vs. LSU
- Conference: Southwest Conference

Ranking
- Coaches: No. 15
- AP: No. 17
- Record: 9–3 (6–2 SWC)
- Head coach: Grant Teaff (14th season)
- Offensive coordinator: Duke Christian (7th season)
- Offensive scheme: I formation
- Defensive coordinator: Pete Fredenburg (3rd season)
- Base defense: 4–4
- Home stadium: Baylor Stadium

1985 Southwest Conference football standings
	Conf.					Overall
Team	W		L		T	W		L		T
No. 6 Texas A&M $	7	–	1	–	0	10	–	2	–	0
No. 12 Arkansas	6	–	2	–	0	10	–	2	–	0
No. 17 Baylor	6	–	2	–	0	9	–	3	–	0
Texas	6	–	2	–	0	8	–	4	–	0
SMU	5	–	3	–	0	6	–	5	–	0
Houston	3	–	5	–	0	4	–	7	–	0
Rice	2	–	6	–	0	3	–	8	–	0
Texas Tech	1	–	7	–	0	4	–	7	–	0
TCU	0	–	8	–	0	3	–	8	–	0
$ – Conference champion; Rankings from AP Poll

The 1985 Baylor Bears football team represented Baylor University as a member of the Southwest Conference (SWC) during the 1985 NCAA Division I-A football season. Led by 14th-year head coach Grant Teaff, the Bears compiled an overall record of 9–3 with a mark of 6–2 in conference play, placing in a three-way tie for second in the SWC. Baylor was invited to the Liberty Bowl, where the Bears defeated LSU. The team played home games at Baylor Stadium in Waco, Texas.

A highlight of the season was a win at USC on September 21 when the Trojans were ranked in the top 5.

== Schedule ==
Date	Opponent	Rank	Site	TV	Result	Attendance	Source
September 7	Wyoming*		Baylor Stadium; Waco, TX		W 39–18	32,000	
September 14	at Georgia*		Sanford Stadium; Athens, GA	TBS	L 14–17	77,190	
September 21	at No. 3 USC*		Los Angeles Memorial Coliseum; Los Angeles, CA		W 20–13	52,544	
September 28	Texas Tech		Baylor Stadium; Waco, TX (rivalry)	Raycom	W 31–0	36,500	
October 5	at Houston	No. 19	Houston Astrodome; Houston, TX (rivalry)	HSE	W 24–21	25,787	
October 12	at No. 16 SMU	No. 19	Texas Stadium; Irving, TX		W 21–14	42,112	
October 19	Texas A&M	No. 14	Baylor Stadium; Waco, TX (Battle of the Brazos)		W 20–15	48,756	
October 26	TCU^{†}	No. 13	Baylor Stadium; Waco, TX (rivalry)		W 45–0	42,500	
November 9	at No. 10 Arkansas	No. 8	War Memorial Stadium; Little Rock, AR	ABC	L 14–20	54,684	
November 16	Rice	No. 17	Baylor Stadium; Waco, TX		W 34–10	30,250	
November 23	at Texas	No. 15	Texas Memorial Stadium; Austin, TX (rivalry)	Raycom	L 10–17	78,912	
December 27	vs. No. 12 LSU*		Liberty Bowl Memorial Stadium; Memphis, TN (Liberty Bowl)	Katz	W 21–7	40,186	
*Non-conference game; ^{†}Homecoming; Rankings from AP Poll released prior to the game

== Game summaries ==
=== At Georgia ===
Team	1	2	3	4	Total
Bears	0	7	0	7	14
• Bulldogs	7	0	10	0	17

- Date: September 14
- Location: Sanford Stadium
  Athens, Georgia
- Game attendance: 77,190
- Television network: WTBS

Scoring summary
1	1:27	UGA	Fred Lane 33-yard run (Steve Crumley kick)	UGA 7–0
2	3:26	Baylor	Ralph Stockemer 1-yard run (Terry Syler kick)	Tied 7–7
3		UGA	Tim Worley 1-yard run (Steve Crumley kick)	UGA 14–7
3		UGA	Steve Crumley 42-yard field goal	UGA 17–7
4	3:40	Baylor	Glenn Pruitt 25-yard pass from Tom Muecke (Terry Syler kick)	UGA 17–14

=== At No. 3 USC ===
Team	1	2	3	4	Total
• Bears	0	10	7	3	20
No. 3 Trojans	7	0	0	6	13

- Date: September 21
- Location: Los Angeles Memorial Coliseum
  Los Angeles, California
- Game attendance: 53,246
- Referee: Larry Thompson
- TV announcers (Lorimar): Geoff Witcher (play-by-play) and Jim Perry (analyst)

Scoring summary
1		USC	Hank Norman 9-yard pass from Sean Salisbury (Don Shafer kick)	Baylor 7–0
2	2:46	Baylor	Tom Muecke 3-yard run (Terry Syler kick)	Tied 7–7
2		Baylor	Terry Syler 39-yard field goal	Baylor 10–7
3	9:49	Baylor	Derrick McAdoo 22-yard pass from Tom Muecke (Terry Syler kick)	Baylor 17–7
4		USC	Randy Tanner 19-yard pass from Sean Salisbury (kick blocked)	Baylor 17–13
4	6:06	BAY	Terry Syler 32-yard field goal	Baylor 20–13

=== At No. 12 Arkansas ===
Baylor at Arkansas

Team	1	2	3	4	Total
No. 11 Bears	0	7	7	0	14
• No. 12 Razorbacks	0	0	6	14	20

- Date: November 9
- Location: War Memorial Stadium,
  Little Rock, Arkansas
- Game attendance: 54,684
- Referee: Joe Thomas
- TV announcers (ABC Sports): Al Michaels (play-by-play)

Scoring summary
2		Baylor	?-yard pass from Cody Carlson (kick)	Baylor 7-0
3	9:02	Baylor	Matt Clark 88-yard pass from Tom Muecke (kick)	Baylor 14-0
3		Arkansas	Carl Miller 4-yard run (kick failed)	Baylor 14-6
4		Arkansas	#32 5-yard run (pass failed)	Baylor 14-12
4		Arkansas	Luther Franklin 50-yard pass from Greg Thomas (James Rouse run)	Arkansas 20-14

=== vs No. 12 LSU (Liberty Bowl) ===
Team	1	2	3	4	Total
No. 12 Tigers	7	0	0	0	7
• Bears	7	3	3	8	21

- Date: December 27
- Location: Liberty Bowl Memorial Stadium
  Memphis, Tennessee
- Game attendance: 40,186
- Referee: Otho Kortz
- TV announcers (Raycom Sports): Merle Harmon (play-by-play), Bud Wilkinson (analyst) and Kevin Kiley (sportscaster) (sidelines)

Scoring summary
1	LSU	Norman Jefferson 79-yard punt return (Ron Lewis kick)	LSU 7–0
1	Baylor	Matt Clark 5-yard pass from Tom Muecke (Terry Syler kick)	Tied 7–7
2	Baylor	Terry Syler 23-yard field goal	Baylor 10–7
3	Baylor	Terry Syler 35-yard field goal	Baylor 13–7
4	Baylor	John Simpson 15-yard pass from Cody Carlson (Matt Clark pass from Cody Carlson)	Baylor 21–7

== Roster ==
1985 Baylor Bears football team roster
Players
Coaches
Offense

Pos.	#	Name	Class
C	51	John Adickes	Jr
QB	14	Cody Carlson	Jr
QB	10	Tom Muecke	Sr
WR	26	Derrick McAdoo	Jr

Defense

Pos.	#	Name	Class
S		Anthony Coleman	Jr
DB		Ron Francis	Jr
CB		Johnny Thomas	Jr
FS	27	Thomas Everett	Jr
LB	57	Ray Berry	Jr

Special teams

Pos.	#	Name	Class
P		Robert Sawyer	Sr
PK	32	Jim Mueller	Jr
K		Terry Syler

Head coach

- Grant Teaff

Coordinators/assistant coaches

Legend

- (C) Team captain
- (S) Suspended
- (I) Ineligible
- Injured
- Redshirt
