= 1985 Texas Longhorns football team =

American college football season

1985 Texas Longhorns football

Bluebonnet Bowl, L 16–24 vs. Air Force
- Conference: Southwest Conference
- Record: 8–4 (6–2 SWC)
- Head coach: Fred Akers (9th season)
- Offensive coordinator: Ron Toman (5th season)
- Defensive coordinator: David McWilliams (4th season)
- Home stadium: Texas Memorial Stadium

1985 Southwest Conference football standings
	Conf.					Overall
Team	W		L		T	W		L		T
No. 6 Texas A&M $	7	–	1	–	0	10	–	2	–	0
No. 12 Arkansas	6	–	2	–	0	10	–	2	–	0
No. 17 Baylor	6	–	2	–	0	9	–	3	–	0
Texas	6	–	2	–	0	8	–	4	–	0
SMU	5	–	3	–	0	6	–	5	–	0
Houston	3	–	5	–	0	4	–	7	–	0
Rice	2	–	6	–	0	3	–	8	–	0
Texas Tech	1	–	7	–	0	4	–	7	–	0
TCU	0	–	8	–	0	3	–	8	–	0
$ – Conference champion; Rankings from AP Poll

The 1985 Texas Longhorns football team represented the University of Texas at Austin in the 1985 NCAA Division I-A football season. The Longhorns finished the regular season with an 8–3 record and lost to Air Force in the Bluebonnet Bowl.

== Schedule ==
Date	Time	Opponent	Rank	Site	TV	Result	Attendance	Source
September 21	7:00 p.m.	Missouri*		Texas Memorial Stadium; Austin, TX		W 21–17	76,437	
September 28	2:30 p.m.	at Stanford*		Stanford Stadium; Stanford, CA	CBS	W 38–34	53,000	
October 5	7:00 p.m.	Rice	No. 20	Texas Memorial Stadium; Austin, TX (rivalry)		W 44–16	69,471	
October 12	12:00 p.m.	vs. No. 2 Oklahoma*	No. 17	Cotton Bowl; Dallas, TX (Red River Shootout)	HSE	L 7–14	75,587	
October 19	2:30 p.m.	at No. 4 Arkansas		Razorback Stadium; Fayetteville, AR (rivalry)	ABC	W 15–13	53,212	
October 26	2:00 p.m.	at SMU	No. 19	Texas Stadium; Irving, TX		L 14–44	56,874	
November 2	12:00 p.m.	Texas Tech		Texas Memorial Stadium; Austin, TX (rivalry)	Raycom	W 34–21	65,137	
November 9	12:00 p.m.	at Houston		Houston Astrodome; Houston, TX	Raycom	W 34–24	35,821	
November 16	1:00 p.m.	TCU		Texas Memorial Stadium; Austin, TX (rivalry)		W 20–0	66,397	
November 23	12:00 p.m.	No. 15 Baylor		Texas Memorial Stadium; Austin, TX (rivalry)	Raycom	W 17–10	78,912	
November 28	7:00 p.m.	at No. 15 Texas A&M	No. 18	Kyle Field; College Station, TX (rivalry)	ESPN	L 10–42	77,607	
December 31	1:30 p.m.	vs. No. 11 Air Force*		Rice Stadium; Houston, TX (Bluebonnet Bowl)	Lorimar	L 16–24	42,000	
*Non-conference game; Rankings from AP Poll released prior to the game; All times are in Central time

== Season summary ==
=== Texas Tech ===
External videos
- 1985 Texas Tech at Texas – full game broadcast

== Personnel ==
1985 Texas Longhorns football team roster
Players			Coaches
Offense: Pos. / # / Name / Class; QB / / Todd Dodge / Sr	Defense: Pos. / # / Name / Class	Special teams: Pos. / # / Name / Class	Head coach: Fred Akers; Coordinators/assistant coaches Legend: (C) Team captain; (S) Suspended; (I) Ineligible; Injured; Redshirt
