= 1985 Holiday Bowl =

Arizona State Sun Devils	Arkansas Razorbacks
(8–3)	(9–2)
Pac-10	SWC
17	18
Head coach: John Cooper	Head coach: Ken Hatfield
	AP / Coaches; 14 / 12
	1	2	3	4	Total
Arizona State	3	11	0	3	17
Arkansas	7	0	0	11	18
- Date: December 22, 1985
- Season: 1985
- Stadium: Jack Murphy Stadium
- Location: San Diego, California
- MVP: Offensive: RB Bobby Joe Edmonds (Arkansas); Defensive: LB Greg Battle (Arizona State)
- Halftime show: Marching bands
- Attendance: 60,641
- Payout: US$546,957 per team

United States TV coverage
- Network: USA Network; Lorimar Sports Network
- Announcers: Eddie Doucette and Kyle Rote, Jr. (USA Network); Tom Hammond and Terry Donahue (Lorimar Sports Network)

The 1985 Holiday Bowl was a college football bowl game played December 22, 1985, in San Diego, California. It was part of the 1985 NCAA Division I-A football season. It featured the unranked Arizona State Sun Devils, and the 14th ranked Arkansas Razorbacks. It was the first Holiday Bowl game since its inception to not feature BYU.

== Scoring summary ==
Arizona State scored first on a 47-yard field goal from Kent Bostrom taking a 3–0 lead. Arkansas's Derrick Thomas responded by rushing 9 yards for a touchdown, as the Razorbacks claimed a 7–3 lead. That would conclude the 1st quarter of scoring. Bostrom kicked a 22-yard field goal, Jeff Van Raaphorst fired a 16-yard touchdown pass to Aaron Cox, and the 2-point conversion was successful, as Arizona State wound up taking a 14–7 lead to halftime.

In the fourth quarter, Bobby Joe Edmonds scored on a 17-yard rushing touchdown, and the 2-point conversion try was successful, as Arkansas took a 15–14 lead. Bostrom kicked a 28-yard field goal to put the Sun Devils in front 17–15. Arkansas placekicker Kendall Trainor kicked a 37-yard field goal with 23 seconds remaining to give the Hogs the lead, 18–17. Bostrom's field goal attempt at the end of the game for the Sun Devils fell short, and Arkansas held on to win the game.

Arkansas running back Bobby Joe Edmunds was the Offensive MVP, and Arizona State linebacker Greg Battle was the Defensive MVP.

The Razorbacks improved to 10–2 for the season, while the Sun Devils fell to 8–4.
