= Air Force–Hawaii football rivalry =

American college football rivalry

- Air Force Falcons Hawaii Rainbow Warriors
- Sport: Football
- First meeting: October 8, 1966; Air Force, 54–0
- Latest meeting: September 27, 2025; Hawaii, 44–35
- Stadiums: Falcon Stadium; USAF Academy, Colorado, U.S. Clarence T. C. Ching Athletics Complex; Honolulu, Hawaii, U.S.
- Trophy: Kuter Trophy

Statistics
- Total meetings: 24
- All-time series: Air Force leads, 14–9–1 (.604)
- Trophy series: Air Force leads, 13–9–1 (.587)
- Largest victory: Air Force, 54–0 (1966)
- Longest win streak: Air Force, 4 (1983–1987, 1994–1997)
- Current win streak: Hawaii, 2 (2023–present)

Locations of Air Force and Hawaii

The Air Force–Hawaii football rivalry is an American college football rivalry between the Air Force Falcons and the Hawaii Rainbow Warriors.

== History ==
The Kuter Trophy is awarded to the winner of the game. The trophy is named after General Laurence S. Kuter, who was appointed the first head of the Pacific Air Forces Command (located at Hickam Air Force Base in Honolulu) in 1957. The two teams have met 24 times, with Air Force leading the series 14–9–1.

== Game results ==
Air Force victories	Hawaii victories	Tie games

No.	Date	Location	Winning team		Losing team	
1	October 8, 1966	Colorado Springs, CO	Air Force	54	Hawaii	0
2	November 29, 1980	Honolulu, HI	Hawaii	20	Air Force	12
3	November 27, 1982	Honolulu, HI	Hawaii	45	Air Force	21
4	November 5, 1983	Colorado Springs, CO	Air Force	45	Hawaii	10
5	November 23, 1985	Honolulu, HI	#13 Air Force	27	Hawaii	20
6	August 30, 1986	Colorado Springs, CO	Air Force	24	Hawaii	17
7	November 21, 1987	Honolulu, HI	Air Force	34	Hawaii	31
8	November 26, 1988	Honolulu, HI	Hawaii	19	Air Force	14
9	December 9, 1989	Honolulu, HI	Tie	35	Tie	35
10	September 8, 1990	Colorado Springs, CO	Air Force	27	Hawaii	3
11	November 23, 1991	Honolulu, HI	Air Force	24	Hawaii	20
12	September 12, 1992	Colorado Springs, CO	Hawaii	6	Air Force	3
13	November 20, 1993	Honolulu, HI	Hawaii	45	Air Force	17

No.	Date	Location	Winning team		Losing team	
14	December 3, 1994	Honolulu, HI	Air Force	37	Hawaii	24
15	November 25, 1995	Honolulu, HI	Air Force	45	Hawaii	28
16	October 26, 1996	Colorado Springs, CO	Air Force	34	Hawaii	7
17	November 1, 1997	Honolulu, HI	Air Force	34	Hawaii	27
18	November 24, 2001	Honolulu, HI	Hawaii	52	Air Force	30
19	November 16, 2012	Colorado Springs, CO	Air Force	21	Hawaii	7
20	October 31, 2015	Honolulu, HI	Air Force	58	Hawaii	7
21	October 22, 2016	Colorado Springs, CO	Hawaii	34	Air Force	27^{2OT}
22	October 19, 2019	Honolulu, HI	Air Force	56	Hawaii	26
23	November 11, 2023	Honolulu, HI	Hawaii	27	Air Force	13
24	September 27, 2025	Colorado Springs, CO	Hawaii	44	Air Force	35
Series: Air Force leads 14–9–1

== See also ==
- List of NCAA college football rivalry games
