= 1985 BYU Cougars football team =

American college football season

1985 BYU Cougars football

WAC co-champion

Florida Citrus Bowl, L 7–10 vs. Ohio State
- Conference: Western Athletic Conference

Ranking
- Coaches: No. 17
- AP: No. 16
- Record: 11–3 (7–1 WAC)
- Head coach: LaVell Edwards (14th season)
- Offensive coordinator: Roger French (5th season)
- Offensive scheme: West Coast
- Defensive coordinator: Dick Felt (11th season)
- Base defense: 4–3
- Home stadium: Cougar Stadium

1985 Western Athletic Conference football standings
	Conf.					Overall
Team	W		L		T	W		L		T
No. 8 Air Force +	7	–	1	–	0	12	–	1	–	0
No. 16 BYU +	7	–	1	–	0	11	–	3	–	0
Utah	5	–	3	–	0	8	–	4	–	0
Hawaii	4	–	3	–	1	4	–	6	–	2
Colorado State	4	–	4	–	0	5	–	7	–	0
San Diego State	3	–	4	–	1	5	–	6	–	1
New Mexico	2	–	6	–	0	3	–	8	–	0
Wyoming	2	–	6	–	0	3	–	8	–	0
UTEP	1	–	7	–	0	1	–	10	–	0
+ – Conference co-champions; Rankings from AP Poll

The 1985 BYU Cougars football team represented Brigham Young University during the 1985 NCAA Division I-A football season. The Cougars were led by 14th-year head coach LaVell Edwards and played their home games at Cougar Stadium in Provo, Utah. The team competed as a member of the Western Athletic Conference, winning a share of their 10th consecutive conference title with a conference record of 7–1, sharing the title with Air Force. BYU was invited to the 1985 Florida Citrus Bowl, where they lost to Ohio State. The Cougars were ranked 16th in the final AP Poll with an overall record of 11–3. However they lost their first WAC game in three years to UTEP, which is considered to be one of the biggest upsets in college football history, as the Miners were 0–6 at the time the two teams played. It is tied the fifth biggest upset by points spread. It was also the last time a top ten AP poll team lost to a team 0–4 or worse until 2025 when No. 7 Penn State lost to 0–4 UCLA.

== Schedule ==
Date	Opponent	Rank	Site	TV	Result	Attendance	Source
August 29	vs. Boston College*	No. 10	Giants Stadium; East Rutherford, NJ (Kickoff Classic)	Raycom	W 28–14	51,227	
September 7	No. 20 UCLA*	No. 8	Cougar Stadium; Provo, UT	ESPN	L 24–27	65,455	
September 14	Washington*	No. 16	Cougar Stadium; Provo, UT	ABC	W 31–3	65,476	
September 21	at Temple*	No. 13	Veterans Stadium; Philadelphia, PA	KSL (1 hour tape delay)	W 26–24	31,085	
October 5	at Colorado State	No. 15	Hughes Stadium; Fort Collins, CO		W 42–7	26,881	
October 12	San Diego State^{†}	No. 11	Cougar Stadium; Provo, UT		W 28–0	65,407	
October 19	at New Mexico	No. 9	University Stadium; Albuquerque, NM	KSL	W 45–23	20,918	
October 26	at UTEP	No. 7	Sun Bowl; El Paso, TX		L 16–23	22,121	
November 2	Wyoming	No. 17	Cougar Stadium; Provo, UT		W 59–0	65,243	
November 9	at Utah State*	No. 18	Romney Stadium; Logan, UT (rivalry)	KSL	W 44–0	29,024	
November 16	No. 4 Air Force	No. 16	Cougar Stadium; Provo, UT	KSL	W 28–21	65,393	
November 23	Utah	No. 11	Cougar Stadium; Provo, UT (Holy War)		W 38–28	65,473	
December 7	at Hawaii	No. 9	Aloha Stadium; Halawa, HI		W 26–6	47,482	
December 28	vs. No. 17 Ohio State*	No. 9	Citrus Bowl; Orlando, FL (Florida Citrus Bowl)	NBC	L 7–10	50,920	
*Non-conference game; ^{†}Homecoming; Rankings from AP Poll released prior to the game

== Game summaries ==
=== Vs. Boston College (Kickoff Classic) ===
No. 10 BYU Cougars vs. Boston College Eagles (Kickoff Classic) – Game summary

Quarter	1	2	3	4	Total
No. 10 Cougars	0	14	7	7	28
Eagles	0	7	7	0	14

at Giants Stadium, East Rutherford, New Jersey

- Date: August 29
- Game time: 6:00 p.m. MDT/8:00 p.m. EDT
- Game weather: Partly cloudy, 80 °F (27 °C)
- Game attendance: 51,227
- Box score

Game information
First quarter
- No scoring plays

Second quarter

- BYU – Mark Bellini 6-yard pass from Robbie Bosco (kick failed), 13:11. Cougars 6–0.
- BYU – Lakei Heimuli 1-yard run (Robbie Bosco pass to Kelly Smith), 9:34. Cougars 14–0.
- BC – John Mihalik 1-yard run (Tim George kick), 5:40. Cougars 14–7.

Third quarter

- BC – Troy Stradford 5-yard run (Tim George kick), 5:33. Tied 14–14.
- BYU – Mark Bellini 12-yard pass from Robbie Bosco (Gary Webster kick), 3:38. Cougars 21–14.

Fourth quarter

- BYU – Glen Kozlowski 22-yard pass from Robbie Bosco (Gary Webster kick), 8:32. Cougars 28–14.

Team	Category	Player	Statistics
BYU	Passing	Robbie Bosco	35/53, 508 yards, 3 TD, 4 INT
BYU	Rushing	Vai Sikahema	7 rushes, 27 yards
BYU	Receiving	Glen Kozlowski	10 receptions, 241 yards, TD
Boston College	Passing	Shawn Halloran	18/37, 159 yards, 3 INT
Boston College	Rushing	Troy Stradford	21 rushes, 101 yards, TD
Boston College	Receiving	Scott Gieselman	9 receptions, 78 yards

=== No. 20 UCLA ===
No. 20 UCLA Bruins at No. 8 BYU Cougars – Game summary

Quarter	1	2	3	4	Total
No. 20 Bruins	10	3	3	11	27
No. 8 Cougars	3	14	0	7	24

at Cougar Stadium, Provo, Utah

- Date: September 7
- Game time: 5:45 p.m. MDT
- Game weather: Partly cloudy, 76 °F (24 °C)
- Game attendance: 65,455
- Box score

Game information
First quarter
- UCLA – John Lee 25-yard field goal, 8:57. Bruins 3–0.
- BYU – Gary Webster 24-yard field goal, 3:23. Tied 3–3.
- UCLA – Craig Rutledge 65-yard interception return (Gary Webster kick), 1:26. Bruins 10–3.

Second quarter

- BYU – Mark Bellini 10-yard pass from Robbie Bosco (Gary Webster kick), 13:47. Tied 10–10.
- UCLA – John Lee 35-yard field goal, 6:28. Bruins 13–10.
- BYU – Glen Kozlowski 7-yard pass from Robbie Bosco (Gary Webster kick), 3:29. Cougars 17–13.

Third quarter

- UCLA – John Lee 20-yard field goal, 5:29. Cougars 17–16.

Fourth quarter

- UCLA – John Lee 25-yard field goal, 9:01. Bruins 19–17.
- BYU – Robbie Bosco 1-yard run (Gary Webster kick), 2:57. Cougars 24–19.
- UCLA – Gaston Green 2-yard run (Gaston Green run), 1:02. Bruins 27–24.

Team	Category	Player	Statistics
UCLA	Passing	Matt Stevens	6/11, 113 yards
UCLA	Rushing	Marcus Greenwood	13 rushes, 71 yards
UCLA	Receiving	Mike Sherrard	6 receptions, 98 yards
BYU	Passing	Robbie Bosco	29/41, 340 yards, 2 TD, 2 INT
BYU	Rushing	Vai Sikahema	6 rushes, 54 yards
BYU	Receiving	Vai Sikahema	8 receptions, 129 yards

=== At UTEP ===
No. 7 BYU Cougars at UTEP Miners – Game summary

Quarter	1	2	3	4	Total
No. 7 Cougars	10	0	6	0	16
Miners	10	10	3	0	23

at Sun Bowl, El Paso, Texas

- Date: October 26
- Game weather: Clear, 75 °F (24 °C)
- Game attendance: 22,121
- Box score

Game information
First quarter
- BYU – Scott Norberg 11-yard pass from Robbie Bosco (Gary Webster kick), 11:29. Cougars 7–0.
- UTEP – Clarence Seay 52-yard pass from Sammy Garza (Hugo Castellanos kick), 9:33. Tied 7–7.
- BYU – Gary Webster 45-yard field goal, 6:03. Cougars 10–7.
- UTEP – Hugo Castellanos 50-yard field goal, 1:08. Tied 10–10.

Second quarter

- UTEP – Danny Taylor 100-yard interception return (Hugo Castellanos kick), 5:52. Miners 17–10.
- UTEP – Hugo Castellanos 31-yard field goal, 0:13. Miners 20–10.

Third quarter

- BYU – Lakei Heimuli 1-yard run (kick failed), 9:44. Miners 20–16.
- UTEP – Hugo Castellanos 29-yard field goal, 6:00. Miners 23–16.

Team	Category	Player	Statistics
BYU	Passing	Robbie Bosco	15/34, 151 yards, TD, 4 INT
BYU	Rushing	Lakei Heimuli	30 rushes, 154 yards, TD
BYU	Receiving	Kelly Smith	7 receptions, 60 yards
UTEP	Passing	Sammy Garza	8/16, 147 yards, TD, 2 INT
UTEP	Rushing	John Harvey	25 rushes, 112 yards
UTEP	Receiving	Larry Linne	3 receptions, 56 yards

=== No. 4 Air Force ===
No. 4 Air Force Falcons at No. 16 BYU Cougars – Game summary

Quarter	1	2	3	4	Total
No. 4 Falcons	14	7	0	0	21
No. 16 Cougars	0	7	14	7	28

at Cougar Stadium, Provo, Utah

- Date: November 16
- Game weather: Cloudy, 35 °F (2 °C)
- Game attendance: 65,393
- Box score

Game information
First quarter
- AFA – Randy Jones 22-yard pass from Bart Weiss (Tom Ruby kick), 12:29. Falcons 7–0.
- AFA – Tom Rotello 25-yard interception return (Tom Ruby kick), 12:09. Falcons 14–0.

Second quarter

- BYU – Mark Bellini 22-yard pass from Robbie Bosco (Gary Webster kick), 12:46. Falcons 14–7.
- AFA – Dwan Wilson 58-yard interception return (Tom Ruby kick), 8:36. Falcons 21–7.

Third quarter

- BYU – Vai Sikahema 72-yard punt return (kick failed), 12:47. Falcons 21–13.
- BYU – Mark Bellini 25-yard pass from Robbie Bosco (Robbie Bosco pass to Lance Lindley), 4:42. Tied 21–21.

Fourth quarter

- BYU – Vai Sikahema 69-yard pass from Robbie Bosco (Gary Webster kick), 5:41. Cougars 28–21.

Team	Category	Player	Statistics
Air Force	Passing	Bart Weiss	9/18, 101 yards, TD, INT
Air Force	Rushing	Pat Evans	18 rushes, 65 yards
Air Force	Receiving	Randy Jones	2 receptions, 25 yards, TD
BYU	Passing	Robbie Bosco	29/49, 343 yards, 3 TD, 4 INT
BYU	Rushing	Tom Tuipulotu	3 rushes, 15 yards
BYU	Receiving	Mark Bellini	9 receptions, 143 yards, 2 TD

Robbie Bosco wore number 7 in honor of injured teammate Glen Kozlowski.

=== Vs. No. 17 Ohio State (Florida Citrus Bowl) ===
1985 Florida Citrus Bowl
No. 9 BYU Cougars vs. No. 17 Ohio State Buckeyes

Quarter	1	2	3	4	Total
No. 9 Cougars	0	7	0	0	7
No. 17 Buckeyes	0	3	7	0	10

at Citrus Bowl, Orlando, Florida

- Date: December 28
- Game time: 12:30 p.m. MST/10:30 p.m. EST
- Game weather: Clear, 63 °F (17 °C)
- Game attendance: 50,920
- Referee: Vincent Price
- TV announcers (NBC): Jay Randolph, Dave Rowe, and Tom Hammond
- Box score

Game information
First quarter
- No scoring plays

Second quarter

- OSU – Rich Spangler 47-yard field goal, 10:32. Buckeyes 3–0.
- BYU – David Miles 38-yard pass from Robbie Bosco (Gary Webster kick), 0:52. Cougars 7–3.

Third quarter

- OSU – Larry Kolic 14-yard interception return (Rich Spangler kick), 13:52. Buckeyes 10–7.

Fourth quarter

- No scoring plays

Team	Category	Player	Statistics
BYU	Passing	Robbie Bosco	26/50, 261 yards, TD, 4 INT
BYU	Rushing	Tom Tuipulotu	9 rushes, 43 yards
BYU	Receiving	Mark Bellini	5 receptions, 87 yards
Ohio State	Passing	Jim Karsatos	19/35, 196 yards
Ohio State	Rushing	John Wooldridge	25 rushes, 109 yards
Ohio State	Receiving	Cris Carter	6 receptions, 85 yards

== Personnel ==
1985 BYU Cougars football team roster
Players
Coaches
Offense

Pos.	#	Name	Class
QB		Robbie Bosco
RB		Bruce Hansen	Jr
WR	7	Glen Kozlowski

Defense

Pos.	#	Name	Class
OLB	42	Darin Nelson
LB	53	Cary Whittingham	Sr

Special teams

Pos.	#	Name	Class

Head coach

- LaVell Edwards

Coordinators/assistant coaches

Legend

- (C) Team captain
- (S) Suspended
- (I) Ineligible
- Injured
- Redshirt
