= 1985 Texas A&M Aggies football team =

American college football season

1985 Texas A&M Aggies football

SWC champion Cotton Bowl Classic champion

Cotton Bowl Classic, W 36–16 vs. Auburn
- Conference: Southwest Conference

Ranking
- Coaches: No. 7
- AP: No. 6
- Record: 10–2 (7–1 SWC)
- Head coach: Jackie Sherrill (4th season)
- Offensive coordinator: Lynn Amedee (1st season)
- Offensive scheme: Multiple
- Defensive coordinator: R. C. Slocum (6th season)
- Base defense: 3–4
- Home stadium: Kyle Field

1985 Southwest Conference football standings
	Conf.					Overall
Team	W		L		T	W		L		T
No. 6 Texas A&M $	7	–	1	–	0	10	–	2	–	0
No. 12 Arkansas	6	–	2	–	0	10	–	2	–	0
No. 17 Baylor	6	–	2	–	0	9	–	3	–	0
Texas	6	–	2	–	0	8	–	4	–	0
SMU	5	–	3	–	0	6	–	5	–	0
Houston	3	–	5	–	0	4	–	7	–	0
Rice	2	–	6	–	0	3	–	8	–	0
Texas Tech	1	–	7	–	0	4	–	7	–	0
TCU	0	–	8	–	0	3	–	8	–	0
$ – Conference champion; Rankings from AP Poll

The 1985 Texas A&M Aggies football team represented Texas A&M University as a member of the Southwest Conference (SWC) during the 1985 NCAA Division I-A football season. Led by fourth-year head coach Jackie Sherrill, the Aggies compiled an overall record of 10–2 with a mark of 7–1 in conference play, winning the SWC title. Texas A&M earned a berth in the Cotton Bowl Classic, where the Aggies defeated Auburn. The team played home games at Kyle Field in College Station, Texas.

== Schedule ==
Date	Time	Opponent	Rank	Site	TV	Result	Attendance	Source
September 14	6:45 p.m.	at No. 20 Alabama*		Legion Field; Birmingham, AL	ESPN	L 10–23	74,697	
September 21		Northeast Louisiana*		Kyle Field; College Station, TX		W 31–17	46,851	
September 28		Tulsa*		Kyle Field; College Station, TX		W 45–10	44,342	
October 5		at Texas Tech		Jones Stadium; Lubbock, TX (rivalry)		W 28–27	50,148	
October 12		Houston		Kyle Field; College Station, TX		W 43–16	55,711	
October 19		at No. 14 Baylor		Baylor Stadium; Waco, TX (Battle of the Brazos)		L 15–20	48,756	
October 26		at Rice		Rice Stadium; Houston, TX		W 43–28	41,195	
November 2		No. 19 SMU		Kyle Field; College Station, TX	ESPN	W 19–17	54,597	
November 16		No. 9 Arkansas		Kyle Field; College Station, TX (rivalry)	ESPN	W 10–6	58,632	
November 23		at TCU	No. 19	Amon G. Carter Stadium; Fort Worth, TX (rivalry)		W 53–6	38,782	
November 28	7:00 p.m.	No. 18 Texas	No. 15	Kyle Field; College Station, TX (rivalry)	ESPN	W 42–10	77,607	
January 1		vs. No. 16 Auburn*	No. 11	Cotton Bowl; Dallas, TX (Cotton Bowl Classic)	CBS	W 36–16	73,137	
*Non-conference game; Rankings from AP Poll released prior to the game; All times are in Central time

== Game summaries ==
=== At Alabama ===
Team	1	2	3	4	Total
Aggies	0	3	7	0	10
• No. 20 Crimson Tide	7	3	0	13	23

- Date: September 14
- Location: Legion Field
- Game attendance: 74,697
- Television network: ESPN

Scoring summary
1		ALA	Chester Braggs 2-yard run (Van Tiffin kick)	ALA 7–0
2	2:46	A&M	Eric Franklin 20-yard field goal	ALA 7–3
2		ALA	Van Tiffin 57-yard field goal	ALA 10–3
3		A&M	Anthony Toney 1-yard run (kick)	Tied 10–10
4	11:15	ALA	Van Kiffin 40-yard field goal	ALA 13–10
4		ALA	Van Kiffin 51-yard field goal	ALA 16–10
4	1:07	ALA	Craig Turner 32-yard run (Tiffin kick)	ALA 23–10

=== Vs. No. 16 Auburn (Cotton Bowl Classic) ===
Team	1	2	3	4	Total
No. 16 Tigers	7	6	3	0	16
• No. 11 Aggies	12	3	6	15	36

- Date: January 1, 1986
- Location: Cotton Bowl, Dallas, Texas
- Game attendance: 73,137
- Referee: Sam Maphis
- TV announcers (CBS): Brent Musburger, Ara Parseghian

Scoring summary
1	AUB	Bo Jackson 5-yard run (Chris Johnson kick)	AUB 7–0
1	A&M	Harry Johnson 11-yard run (Eric Franklin kick failed)	AUB 7–6
1	A&M	Keith Woodside 22-yard run (pass failed)	A&M 12–7
2	AUB	Bo Jackson 73-yard pass from Pat Washington (run failed)	AUB 13–12
2	A&M	Scott Slater 26-yard field goal	A&M 15–13
3	A&M	Anthony Toney 21-yard run (pass failed)	A&M 21–13
3	AUB	Johnson 26-yard field goal	A&M 21–16
4	A&M	Keith Woodside 9-yard pass from Kevin Murray (Rod Bernstine run)	A&M 29–16
4	A&M	Toney 1-yard run (Slater kick)	A&M 36–16

== Roster ==
1985 Texas A&M Aggies football team roster
Players
Coaches
Offense

Pos.	#	Name	Class
QB	14	Kevin Murray	Jr
RB		Randy Dausin	Sr
RB	25	Anthony Toney	Sr
RB		Ira Valentine	Jr
RB	33	Keith Woodside	So
FB	43	Roger Vick	Jr
C		Matt Darwin	Sr
OT		Doug Williams	Sr
TE		Rod Bernstine	Jr
WR		Rod Harris	Fr
WR	8	Jeff Nelson	Sr

Defense

Pos.	#	Name	Class
DB		Wayne Asberry	Sr
DB	6	Domingo Bryant	Sr
LB	11	Johnny Holland	Jr
DL	99	Rod Saddler	Jr

Special teams

Pos.	#	Name	Class
K	47	Eric Franklin

Head coach

- Jackie Sherrill

Coordinators/assistant coaches

- Lynn Amedee (OC)
- R. C. Slocum (DC)
- George Pugh (assistant)
- Charlie Strong (GA)

Legend

- (C) Team captain
- (S) Suspended
- (I) Ineligible
- Injured
- Redshirt
