= Lorimar Sports Network =

American sports syndication enterprise

- Logo used from 1984 to 1986. The same logo was used by Lorimar Productions.
- Formerly: Sports Productions, Inc. (1983–1984)
- Industry: Sports television Production; Sales & Marketing; Syndication; Distribution
- Founded: September 1983; 43 years ago
- Defunct: March 1986; 40 years ago
- Fate: Defunct
- Headquarters: Dallas, Texas; Culver City, California
- Key people: Bill Flaherty; Dave Almstead (Director of Syndication); John Humphrey (Director of Promotion and Media)
- Products: Southeastern Conference men's basketball (1984–1986); Big Ten men's basketball (1985–1986); Pacific-10 Conference men's basketball (1984–1986); Metro Conference men's basketball (1983–1984); Western Athletic Conference men's basketball (1983–1985); Freedom Bowl; Bluebonnet Bowl; Holiday Bowl
- Parent: Lorimar Productions (1983–1985); Lorimar-Telepictures (1985–1986)

The Lorimar Sports Network, or LSN, was an American ad hoc television network providing syndicated college football and basketball. It was based at Lorimar's original headquarters in Culver City, California, with an additional office in Dallas, Texas. It was in operation from 1983 until 1986.

== History ==
=== Beginning ===
It began in 1983 as a new sports broadcasting division of Lorimar Productions, adopting the branding Sports Productions, Incorporated, or SPI. It was then renamed the Lorimar Sports Network in Summer 1984.

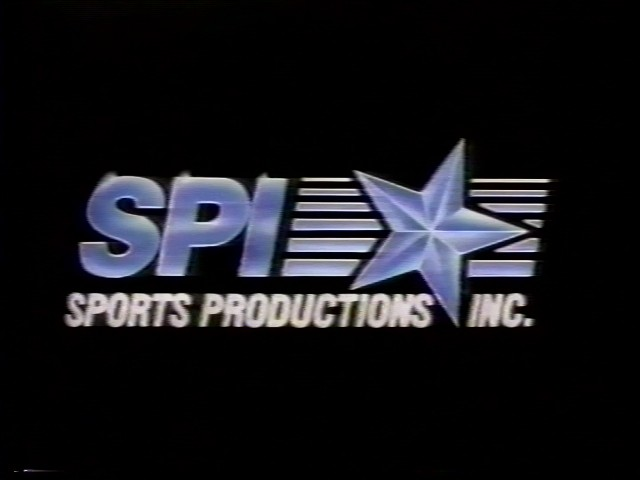
Company logo as Sports Productions Incorporated.

=== Sports programming ===
Under both banners, the Lorimar Sports Network had a history of bringing major events in men's college basketball and football. It acquired Southeastern Conference (SEC) basketball from the TVS Television Network in 1983. It also acquired rights to the Big Ten, Metro, and WAC. The SEC on SPI/Lorimar ran from January 1984 until the end of the 1985-1986 season.

LSN also broadcast the Freedom Bowl in 1985, along with the Holiday and Bluebonnet Bowls at the end of the 1985-86 football season, as well as Pacific-10 Conference football during those years.

=== Demise ===
The Lorimar Sports Network dissolved over time when they lost broadcast rights to all the conferences they had rights for, especially after the end of the 1985-1986 sports season. Rights to Metro Conference basketball were the first to be lost by LSN as Raycom Sports won rights to the Metro in 1985, and then the Big Ten conference in 1986, two years after Raycom won rights to basketball games from the Big 8 (now Big 12) conference; both the Big 8 and Big Ten were acquired by Raycom in 1986. The 1986 SEC, Big Ten and Pacific-10 Conference men's basketball tournaments (except the championships) were LSN's last sports broadcast because Raycom won syndication rights to the Pac-10 starting with the 1986-87 season. As for SEC Basketball, Raycom's Atlantic Coast Conference broadcast partner, Jefferson-Pilot Teleproductions (later Jefferson Pilot Sports, Lincoln Financial Sports, now part of Raycom Sports) won those rights beginning with the 1986-87 basketball season, added SEC football in 1992, and those rights remained with that company (which became Lincoln Financial Sports in 2006, and became part of Raycom Sports on January 1, 2008) until the end of the 2008-2009 season. The Freedom and Bluebonnet Bowls, however, ended up with the Mizlou Television Network for the 1986, 1987, and 1988 installments.

In February 1986, Lorimar completed a merger with Telepictures, to form Lorimar-Telepictures. After the Lorimar Sports Network was dissolved in summer 1986, the Lorimar studio itself, including its extensive library of produced and/or distributed programming, was bought out in its entirety by the Burbank, California-based Warner Bros. studio in 1988. Telepictures, on the other hand, once again became a separate production and syndication company under Time Warner ownership.

== Notable on-air personalities ==
This is a partial list.

- Tom Hammond, play-by-play commentator (SEC basketball, 1985 Bluebonnet Bowl, 1985 Holiday Bowl)
- Joe Dean, color analyst (SEC basketball)
- Tim Brando, play-by-play commentator (Metro Conference basketball)
- John Rooney, play-by-play commentator (Metro Conference basketball)
- Bob Carpenter, play-by-play commentator (Big Ten basketball)
- Irv Brown, Color analyst (WAC basketball)
- Barry Tompkins, play-by-play commentator (1985 Freedom Bowl, PAC-10 Conference Football and Basketball)
- Steve Grote, color analyst (Metro Conference Basketball)
- Lou Holtz, color analyst (1985 Freedom Bowl)
- Gifford Nielsen, color analyst (1984 Texas AAAAA State Football Championship and 1985 Bluebonnet Bowl)
- John Laskowski, color analyst (Big Ten Basketball)
- Terry Donahue, color analyst (1985 Holiday Bowl)
- Verne Lundquist, Play by Play (1983 Texas AAAAA State Football Championship)
- Roger Staubach, color analyst (1983 Texas AAAAA State Football Championship)
- Darrell Royal, color analyst (1983 Texas AAAAA State Football Championship)
- Brad Sham, Play by Play (1984 Texas AAAAA State Football Championship)
- Ralph Hacker, Play by Play (SEC Basketball)

== See also ==
- TVS Television Network
- Mizlou Television Network
- Raycom Sports

Preceded by TVS Television Network	Syndication Rightsholder to Southeastern Conference men's basketball 1983-1986	Succeeded by Jefferson-Pilot Teleproductions
