= 1985 NCAA Division I-A football rankings =

- Season: 1985
- Bowl season: 1985–86 bowl games
- Preseason No. 1: Oklahoma
- End of season champions: Oklahoma
- Conference with most teams in final AP poll: SEC (4)

Two human polls comprised the 1985 National Collegiate Athletic Association (NCAA) Division I-A football rankings. Unlike most sports, college football's governing body, the NCAA, does not bestow a national championship, instead that title is bestowed by one or more different polling agencies. There are two main weekly polls that begin in the preseason—the AP Poll and the Coaches Poll.

== Legend ==
	Increase in ranking
	Decrease in ranking
	Not ranked previous week
	National champion
(#–#)	Win–loss record
(Italics)	Number of first place votes
т	Tied with team above or below also with this symbol

== AP Poll ==
	Preseason Aug	Week 1 Sep 3	Week 2 Sep 10	Week 3 Sep 17	Week 4 Sep 24	Week 5 Oct 1	Week 6 Oct 8	Week 7 Oct 15	Week 8 Oct 22	Week 9 Oct 29	Week 10 Nov 5	Week 11 Nov 12	Week 12 Nov 19	Week 13 Nov 26	Week 14 Dec 3	Week 15 Dec 10	Week 16 (Final) Jan 2	
1.	Oklahoma (23)	Oklahoma (0–0)	Auburn (1–0) (16)	Auburn (2–0) (23)	Auburn (2–0) (26)	Iowa (3–0) (35)	Iowa (4–0) (34)	Iowa (5–0) (27)	Iowa (6–0) (60)	Iowa (7–0) (58)	Florida (7–0–1) (42)	Penn State (9–0)	Penn State (10–0) (46)	Penn State (11–0) (49)	Penn State (11–0) (47)	Penn State (11–0) (47)	Oklahoma (11–1) (55)	1.
2.	Auburn (13)	Auburn (0–0)	Oklahoma (0–0) (28)	Oklahoma (0–0) (23)	Oklahoma (0–0) (21)	Oklahoma (1–0) (13)	Oklahoma (2–0)	Michigan (5–0) (20)	Florida (5–0–1)	Florida (6–0–1)	Penn State (8–0) (15)	Nebraska (8–1)	Nebraska (9–1) (12)	Iowa (10–1) (3)	Miami (FL) (10–1) (3)	Miami (FL) (10–1) (3)	Michigan (10–1–1) (1)	2.
3.	SMU (3)	SMU (0–0)	Florida (1–0) (3)	USC (1–0) (6)	Iowa (2–0) (5)	SMU (2–0) (6)	Michigan (4–0)	Oklahoma (3–0) (12)	Penn State (6–0)	Penn State (7–0)	Nebraska (7–1)	Ohio State (8–1)	Iowa (9–1)	Oklahoma (8–1) (6)	Iowa (10–1) (3)	Oklahoma (10–1) (5)	Penn State (11–1)	3.
4.	Iowa (7)	Iowa (0–0)	USC (1–0) (6)	Iowa (1–0) (5)	Florida State (3–0)	Florida State (4–0) (1)	Florida State (4–0)	Arkansas (5–0)	Michigan (5–1)	Michigan (6–1)	Ohio State (7–1) (1)	Air Force (10–0)	Miami (FL) (8–1)	Miami (FL) (9–1) (1)	Oklahoma (9–1) (5)	Iowa (10–1) (3)	Tennessee (9–1–2) (1)	4.
5.	Florida (4)	Florida (0–0)	Iowa (0–0) (5)	SMU (1–0) (3)	Ohio State (2–0)	Ohio State (3–0)	Oklahoma State (4–0)	Florida (4–0–1)	Nebraska (5–1)	Nebraska (6–1)	Air Force (9–0)	Iowa (7–1)	Oklahoma (7–1) (2)	Michigan (9–1–1) (1)	Michigan (9–1–1) (1)	Michigan (9–1–1) (1)	Florida (9–1–1)	5.
6.	USC (2)	USC (0–0)	SMU (1–0) (2)	Florida State (2–0)	SMU (1–0)	Oklahoma State (3–0) (1)	Arkansas (4–0)	Penn State (5–0) (1)	Auburn (5–1)	Auburn (6–1)	Iowa (7–1)	Miami (FL) (7–1)	Michigan (8–1–1)	Florida (8–1–1)	Florida (9–1–1)	Florida (9–1–1)	Texas A&M (10–2)	6.
7.	Maryland (3)	Maryland (0–0)	Florida State (2–0)	Ohio State (1–0)	Oklahoma State (2–0)	Michigan (3–0) (3)	Florida (3–0–1)	Nebraska (4–1)	BYU (6–1)	Air Force (8–0)	Oklahoma (5–1) (1)	Oklahoma (6–1)	Oklahoma State (8–1)	Auburn (8–2)	Nebraska (9–2)	Nebraska (9–2)	UCLA (9–2–1)	7.
8.	Ohio State	BYU (1–0)	Oklahoma State (1–0)	Oklahoma State (2–0)	LSU (2–0)	LSU (2–0)	Penn State (4–0)	Auburn (4–1)	Air Force (7–0)	Ohio State (6–1)	Miami (FL) (7–1)	Michigan (7–1–1)	UCLA (8–1–1)	Nebraska (9–2)	Tennessee (8–1–2)	Tennessee (8–1–2)	Air Force (12–1)	8.
9.	Nebraska	Ohio State (0–0)	Ohio State (0–0)	LSU (1–0)	Penn State (3–0)	Penn State (4–0)	Nebraska (3–1)	BYU (5–1)	Ohio State (5–1)	Oklahoma (4–1)	Michigan (6–1–1)	Arkansas (8–1)	Florida (8–1–1)	BYU (10–2)	BYU (10–2)	BYU (11–2)	Miami (FL) (10–2)	9.
10.	BYU (1)	Nebraska (0–0)	UCLA (1–0)	Penn State (2–0)	Arkansas (2–0)	Arkansas (3–0)	Alabama (4–0)	Air Force (6–0)	Oklahoma (3–1)	Florida State (6–1)	Oklahoma State (6–1)	Oklahoma State (7–1)	Auburn (8–2)	Tennessee (7–1–2)	Air Force (11–1)	Air Force (11–1)	Iowa (10–2)	10.
11.	Illinois (2)	Illinois (0–0)	Penn State (1–0)	Florida (1–0–1)	Florida (1–0–1)	Florida (2–0–1)	BYU (4–1)	Ohio State (4–1)	Florida State (5–1)	Miami (FL) (6–1)	Baylor (7–1)	UCLA (7–1–1)	BYU (9–2)	Air Force (11–1)	Texas A&M (9–2)	Texas A&M (9–2)	Nebraska (9–3)	11.
12.	Washington (2)	Washington (0–0)	LSU (0–0)	UCLA (1–0–1)	Michigan (2–0)	Alabama (4–0)	Auburn (3–1)	Oklahoma State (4–1)	Oklahoma State (4–1)	Oklahoma State (5–1)	Arkansas (7–1)	Georgia (7–1–1)	Ohio State (8–2)	Florida State (8–2)	LSU (8–1–1)	LSU (8–1–1)	Arkansas (10–2)	12.
13.	LSU	LSU (0–0)	Notre Dame (0–0)	BYU (2–1)	UCLA (2–0–1)	Nebraska (2–1)	Air Force (5–0)	Florida State (4–1)	Baylor (6–1)	Baylor (7–1)	Auburn (6–2)	Florida (7–1–1)	Air Force (10–1)	LSU (7–1–1)	Arkansas (9–2)	UCLA (8–2–1)	Alabama (9–2–1)	13.
14.	Notre Dame	Notre Dame (0–0)	Arkansas (0–0)	Arkansas (1–0)	BYU (3–1)	Auburn (2–1)	Tennessee (2–0–1)	Baylor (5–1)	Arkansas (5–1)	Arkansas (6–1)	UCLA (6–1–1)	Auburn (7–2)	Florida State (8–2)	Arkansas (9–2)	UCLA (8–2–1)	Arkansas (9–2)	Ohio State (9–3)	14.
15.	Arkansas	Arkansas (0–0)	South Carolina (2–0)	South Carolina (2–0)	Alabama (3–0)	BYU (3–1)	Ohio State (3–1)	Alabama (4–1)	Miami (FL) (5–1)	UCLA (6–1–1)	LSU (5–1)	BYU (8–2)	Baylor (8–2)	Texas A&M (8–2)	Alabama (8–2–1)	Alabama (8–2–1)	Florida State (9–3)	15.
16.	Oklahoma State	Oklahoma State (0–0)	BYU (1–1)	Alabama (2–0)	Nebraska (1–1)	Tennessee (1–0–1)	SMU (2–1)	Georgia (4–1)	Tennessee (3–1–1)	LSU (4–1)	Florida State (6–2)	Florida State (7–2)	Tennessee (6–1–2)	UCLA (8–2–1)	Auburn (8–3)	Auburn (8–3)	BYU (11–3)	16.
17.	South Carolina	Florida State (1–0)	Maryland (0–1)	Maryland (1–1)	Maryland (2–1)	Air Force (4–0)	Texas (3–0)	LSU (3–1)	UCLA (5–1–1)	BYU (6–2)	Georgia (6–1–1)	Baylor (7–2)	LSU (6–1–1)	Oklahoma State (8–2)	Ohio State (8–3)	Ohio State (8–3)	Baylor (9–3)	17.
18.	Penn State	South Carolina (1–0)	Nebraska (0–1)	Nebraska (0–1)	USC (1–1)	Georgia (3–1)	Georgia (3–1)	UCLA (4–1–1)	LSU (4–1)	Georgia (5–1–1)	BYU (7–2)	Tennessee (5–1–2)	Arkansas (8–2)	Texas (8–2)	Florida State (8–3)	Florida State (8–3)	Maryland (9–3)	18.
19.	Florida State	Penn State (0–0)	Illinois (0–1)	Michigan (1–0)	Air Force (3–0)	Baylor (3–1)	Baylor (4–1)	Army (5–0)	Texas (4–1)	Tennessee (3–1–2)	Tennessee (4–1–2)	LSU (5–1–1)	Texas A&M (7–2)	Ohio State (8–3)	Oklahoma State (8–3)	Oklahoma State (8–3)	Georgia Tech (9–2–1)	19.
20.	UCLA	UCLA (0–0)	Alabama (1–0)	Illinois (1–1)	Virginia (2–0)	Texas (2–0)	LSU (2–1)	Tennessee (2–1–1)	Minnesota (5–1)	SMU (4–2)	Alabama (6–2)	Alabama (6–2–1)	Georgia (7–2–1)	Georgia (7–2–1)	Bowling Green (11–0)	Maryland (8–3) т; Bowling Green (11–0) т	LSU (9–2–1)	20.
	Preseason Aug	Week 1 Sep 3	Week 2 Sep 10	Week 3 Sep 17	Week 4 Sep 24	Week 5 Oct 1	Week 6 Oct 8	Week 7 Oct 15	Week 8 Oct 22	Week 9 Oct 29	Week 10 Nov 5	Week 11 Nov 12	Week 12 Nov 19	Week 13 Nov 26	Week 14 Dec 3	Week 15 Dec 10	Week 16 (Final) Jan 2	
		None	Dropped: Washington	Dropped: Notre Dame	Dropped: South Carolina; Illinois	Dropped: UCLA; Maryland; USC; Virginia	None	Dropped: SMU; Texas	Dropped: Alabama; Georgia; Army	Dropped: Texas; Minnesota	Dropped: SMU	None	Dropped: Alabama	Dropped: Baylor	Dropped: Texas; Georgia	None	Dropped: Auburn; Oklahoma State; Bowling Green	

== Coaches Poll ==
	Preseason Aug	Week 1 Sep 3	Week 2 Sep 10	Week 3 Sep 17	Week 4 Sep 24	Week 5 Oct 1	Week 6 Oct 8	Week 7 Oct 15	Week 8 Oct 22	Week 9 Oct 29	Week 10 Nov 5	Week 11 Nov 12	Week 12 Nov 19	Week 13 Nov 26	Week 14 Dec 3	Week 15 Dec 10	Week 16 (Final) Jan 2	
1.	Oklahoma (14)	Oklahoma (0–0) (14)	Oklahoma (0–0) (18)	Auburn (2–0)	Auburn (2–0) (32)	Iowa (3–0) (19)	Iowa (4–0) (16)	Iowa (5–0) (16)	Iowa (6–0) (42)	Iowa (7–0) (42)	Penn State (8–0) (34)	Penn State (9–0) (34)	Penn State (10–0) (41)	Penn State (11–0) (39)	Penn State (11–0) (37)	Penn State (11–0) (36)	Oklahoma (11–1) (41)	1.
2.	Auburn (8)	Auburn (0–0) (8)	Auburn (1–0) (16)	Oklahoma (0–0)	Oklahoma (0–0) (8)	Oklahoma (1–0) (14)	Oklahoma (2–0) (14)	Oklahoma (3–0) (14)	Penn State (6–0)	Penn State (7–0)	Nebraska (7–1) (5)	Nebraska (8–1) (4)	Nebraska (9–1) (1)	Oklahoma (8–1) (2)	Oklahoma (9–1) (2)	Oklahoma (10–1) (1)	Michigan (10–1–1)	2.
3.	Ohio State	Ohio State (0–0)	USC (1–0) (5)	USC (1–0)	Iowa (2–0)	Ohio State (3–0) (1)	Michigan (4–0) (10)	Michigan (5–0) (11)	Nebraska (5–1)	Nebraska (6–1)	Ohio State (7–1) (1)	Ohio State (8–1)	Oklahoma (7–1)	Iowa (10–1)	Iowa (10–1)	Iowa (10–1)	Penn State (11–1)	3.
4.	Nebraska	Nebraska (0–0)	Ohio State (0–0) (1)	Iowa (1–0)	Ohio State (2–0)	Florida State (4–0) (1)	Florida State (4–0)	Penn State (5–0)	Michigan (5–1)	Michigan (6–1)	Air Force (9–0) (2)	Air Force (10–0) (3)	Iowa (9–1)	Miami (FL) (9–1)	Miami (FL) (10–1)	Miami (FL) (10–1)	Tennessee (9–1–2)	4.
5.	USC (2)	USC (0–0) (2)	Florida State (2–0) (1)	Ohio State (1–0)	Florida State (3–0)	Michigan (3–0) (5)	Oklahoma State (4–0) (1)	Arkansas (5–0)	Auburn (5–1)	Auburn (6–1)	Oklahoma (5–1)	Iowa (8–1)	Miami (FL) (8–1)	Michigan (9–1–1)	Michigan (9–1–1)	Michigan (9–1–1)	Air Force (12–1)	5.
6.	Washington (5)	Washington (0–0) (5)	Oklahoma State (1–0) (1)	Florida State (2–0) (1)	Penn State (3–0)	Oklahoma State (3–0)	Penn State (4–0)	Nebraska (4–1)	Air Force (7–0)	Air Force (8–0)	Iowa (7–1)	Oklahoma (6–1)	Michigan (8–1–1)	Auburn (8–2)	Nebraska (9–2)	Nebraska (9–2)	UCLA (9–2–1)	6.
7.	BYU (9)	BYU (1–0) (9)	Iowa (0–0)	Oklahoma State (1–0) (1)	Oklahoma State (2–0)	Penn State (4–0)	Arkansas (4–0)	Auburn (4–1)	BYU (6–1)	Ohio State (6–1)	Miami (FL) (7–1)	Miami (FL) (8–1)	Oklahoma State (8–1)	Air Force (11–1)	Tennessee (8–1–2)	Air Force (11–1)	Texas A&M (10–2)	7.
8.	Iowa (1)	Iowa (0–0) (1)	UCLA (1–0)	Penn State (2–0)	LSU (2–0)	Alabama (4–0)	Alabama (4–0)	BYU (5–1)	Ohio State (5–1)	Oklahoma (4–1)	Baylor (7–1)	Michigan (7–1–1)	UCLA (8–1–1)	Nebraska (9–2)	Air Force (11–1)	Tennessee (8–1–2)	Miami (FL) (10–2)	8.
9.	Maryland (1)	Maryland (0–0) (1)	Penn State (1–0)	LSU (1–0)	Michigan (2–0)	LSU (2–0)	Nebraska (3–1)	Air Force (6–0)	Florida State (5–1)	Florida State (6–1)	Michigan (6–1–1)	Arkansas (8–1)	Auburn (8–2)	Tennessee (7–1–2)	BYU (10–2)	BYU (11–2)	Iowa (10–2)	9.
10.	Illinois	Illinois (0–0)	LSU (0–0)	BYU (2–1)	Alabama (3–0)	Nebraska (2–1)	BYU (4–1)	Ohio State (4–1)	Oklahoma (3–1)	Baylor (7–1)	Arkansas (7–1)	Oklahoma State (7–1)	Air Force (10–1)	BYU (10–2)	LSU (8–1–1)	LSU (9–1–1)	Nebraska (9–3)	10.
11.	LSU	LSU (0–0)	South Carolina (2–0) т	South Carolina (2–0)	UCLA (2–0–1)	Arkansas (3–0)	Auburn (3–1)	Florida State (4–1)	Baylor (6–1)	Arkansas (6–1)	Oklahoma State (6–1)	UCLA (7–1–1)	Ohio State (8–2)	Florida State (8–2)	Texas A&M (9–2)	Texas A&M (9–2)	Ohio State (9–3)	11.
12.	Notre Dame	Notre Dame (0–0)	Notre Dame (0–0) т	Alabama (2–0)	BYU (3–1)	BYU (3–1)	Air Force (5–0)	Oklahoma State (4–1)	Oklahoma State (4–1)	Miami (FL) (6–1)	UCLA (7–1–1)	Georgia (7–1–1)	Florida State (8–2)	LSU (7–1–1)	Arkansas (9–2)	Arkansas (9–2)	Arkansas (10–2)	12.
13.	Florida State (1)	Florida State (1–0) (1)	BYU (1–1)	UCLA (1–0–1)	Arkansas (2–0)	Auburn (2–1)	Tennessee (2–0–1)	Baylor (5–1)	Arkansas (5–1)	Oklahoma State (5–1)	LSU (5–1)	Auburn (7–2)	BYU (9–2)	Arkansas (9–2)	UCLA (8–2–1)	UCLA (8–2–1)	Florida State (9–3)	13.
14.	Oklahoma State	Oklahoma State (0–0)	Nebraska (0–1)	Arkansas (1–0)	Nebraska (1–1)	Tennessee (1–0–1)	Texas (3–0)	Alabama (4–1) т	Miami (FL) (5–1)	UCLA (6–1–1)	Auburn (6–2)	Florida State (7–2)	Baylor (8–2)	Texas A&M (7–2)	Alabama (8–2–1)	Alabama (8–2–1)	Alabama (9–2–1)	14.
15.	UCLA	UCLA (0–0)	Arkansas (0–0)	Michigan (1–0)	Maryland (2–1)	Air Force (4–0)	Ohio State (3–1)	Georgia (4–1) т	UCLA (5–1–1)	LSU (4–1)	Georgia (6–1–1)	BYU (8–2)	Tennessee (6–1–2)	UCLA (8–2–1)	Auburn (8–3)	Auburn (8–3)	Baylor (9–3)	15.
16.	Arkansas	Arkansas (0–0)	Alabama (1–0)	Maryland (1–1)	USC (1–1)	Texas (2–0)	UCLA (3–1–1)	UCLA (4–1–1)	Tennessee (3–1–1)	BYU (6–2)	Florida State (6–2)	Baylor (7–2)	Arkansas (8–2)	Texas (8–2)	Ohio State (8–3)	Florida State (8–3)	Fresno State (11–0–1) (1)	16.
17.	Penn State	Penn State (0–0)	West Virginia (1–0)	Nebraska (0–1)	Virginia (2–0)	UCLA (2–1–1)	Georgia (3–1)	LSU (3–1)	Texas (4–1)	Georgia (5–1–1)	Tennessee (4–1–2)	Tennessee (5–1–2)	LSU (6–1–1)	Oklahoma State (8–2)	Florida State (8–3)	Ohio State (8–3)	BYU (11–3)	17.
18.	South Carolina	South Carolina (1–0)	Maryland (0–1)	West Virginia (2–0)	Air Force (3–0)	Georgia (3–1)	Baylor (4–1)	Texas (3–1)	LSU (4–1)	Tennessee (3–1–2)	BYU (7–2)	LSU (5–1–1)	Texas A&M (7–2)	Ohio State (8–3)	Fresno State (10–0–1)	Fresno State (10–0–1)	Georgia Tech (9–2–1)	18.
19.	Georgia	Georgia (0–0)	Pittsburgh (1–0)	Arizona (2–0)	Texas (1–0)	Baylor (3–1)	LSU (2–1)	Tennessee (2–1–1)	Arizona (5–1)	Texas A&M (5–2)	Texas A&M (6–2)	Texas A&M (6–2)	Texas (7–2)	Fresno State (10–0–1)	Maryland (8–3)	Oklahoma State (8–3)	Maryland (9–3)	19.
20.	Boston College	Boston College (0–1)	Texas (0–0)	Texas (0–0)	Kansas (3–0)	Indiana (3–0)	Indiana (4–0)	Army (5–0) т Arizona (4–1) т	Minnesota (5–1)	Alabama (5–2)	Alabama (6–2)	Texas (6–2)	Arizona State (8–2)	Georgia (7–2–1)	Arizona (8–3)	Arizona (8–3)	LSU (9–2–1)	20.
	Preseason Aug	Week 1 Sep 3	Week 2 Sep 10	Week 3 Sep 17	Week 4 Sep 24	Week 5 Oct 1	Week 6 Oct 8	Week 7 Oct 15	Week 8 Oct 22	Week 9 Oct 29	Week 10 Nov 5	Week 11 Nov 12	Week 12 Nov 19	Week 13 Nov 26	Week 14 Dec 3	Week 15 Dec 10	Week 16 (Final) Jan 2	
		None	Dropped: Washington; Illinois; Georgia; Boston College	Dropped: Notre Dame; Pittsburgh	Dropped: South Carolina; West Virginia; Arizona	Dropped: Maryland; USC; Virginia; Kansas	None	Dropped: Indiana	Dropped: Alabama; Georgia; Army	Dropped: Texas; Arizona; Minnesota	None	Dropped: Alabama	Dropped: Georgia	Dropped: Baylor; Arizona State	Dropped: Texas; Oklahoma State; Georgia	Dropped: Maryland	Dropped: Auburn; Oklahoma State; Arizona	

== USA/CNN Poll ==
	Week 16 Final Jan 2	
1.	Oklahoma (11–1) (32)	1.
2.	Penn State (11–1)	2.
3.	Michigan (10–1–1)	3.
4.	Tennessee (9–1–2)	4.
5.	Florida (9–1–1)	5.
6.	Miami (FL) (10–2)	6.
7.	Air Force (12–1)	7.
8.	Texas A&M (10–2)	8.
9.	UCLA (9–2–1)	9.
10.	Iowa (10–2)	10.
11.	Nebraska (9–3)	11.
12.	Alabama (9–2–1)	12.
13.	Ohio State (9–3)	13.
14.	Florida State (9–3)	14.
15.	Arkansas (10–2)	15.
16.	BYU (11–3)	16.
17.	Maryland (9–3)	17.
18.	Georgia Tech (9–2–1)	18.
19.	Baylor (9–3)	19.
20.	Auburn (8–4)	20.
21.	LSU (9–2–1)	21.
22.	Army (9–3)	22.
23.	Fresno State (11–0–1)	23.
24.	Georgia (7–3–2)	24.
25.	Oklahoma State (8–4)	25.
	Week 16 Final Jan 2	
