= 1985 Alabama Crimson Tide football team =

American college football season

1985 Alabama Crimson Tide football

Aloha Bowl champion

Aloha Bowl, W 24–3 vs. USC
- Conference: Southeastern Conference

Ranking
- Coaches: No. 14
- AP: No. 13
- Record: 9–2–1 (4–1–1 SEC)
- Head coach: Ray Perkins (3rd season)
- Offensive coordinator: George Henshaw (3rd season)
- Defensive coordinator: Joe Kines (1st season)
- Captains: Jon Hand; Thornton Chandler
- Home stadium: Bryant–Denny Stadium; Legion Field

1985 Southeastern Conference football standings
	Conf.					Overall
Team	W		L		T	W		L		T
No. 4 Tennessee $	5	–	1	–	0	9	–	1	–	2
No. 5 Florida	5	–	1	–	0	9	–	1	–	1
No. 13 Alabama	4	–	1	–	1	9	–	2	–	1
No. 20 LSU	4	–	1	–	1	9	–	2	–	1
Georgia	3	–	2	–	1	7	–	3	–	2
Auburn	3	–	3	–	0	8	–	4	–	0
Ole Miss	2	–	4	–	0	4	–	6	–	1
Vanderbilt	1	–	4	–	1	3	–	7	–	1
Kentucky	1	–	5	–	0	5	–	6	–	0
Mississippi State	0	–	6	–	0	5	–	6	–	0
$ – Conference champion; Florida ineligible for SEC championship due to NCAA probation.; Rankings from AP Poll

The 1985 Alabama Crimson Tide football team (variously "Alabama", "UA", "Bama" or "The Tide") represented the University of Alabama in the 1985 NCAA Division I-A football season. It was the Crimson Tide's 93rd overall and 52nd season as a member of the Southeastern Conference (SEC). The team was led by head coach Ray Perkins, in his third year, and played their home games at both Bryant–Denny Stadium in Tuscaloosa and Legion Field in Birmingham, Alabama. They finished the season with a record of nine wins, two losses and one tie (9–2–1 overall, 4–1–1 in the SEC) and with a victory in the Aloha Bowl over USC.

Highlights of the 1985 season included a last-second, 20–16 comeback victory on Labor Day over Georgia to open the season. The 1985 edition of the Iron Bowl against Auburn is regarded as one of Alabama's most dramatic victories in the history of the series. In the game, Alabama led 16–10 after three quarters, but saw four lead changes in the fourth quarter, including two in the final minute. It ended with Van Tiffin's 52-yard field goal as time expired to give Alabama a 25–23 victory. Tiffin's field goal is remembered simply as "The Kick" in Alabama lore.

Due to NCAA sanctions that led to the forfeit of Alabama's 1993 17–17 tie with Tennessee, and college football's adoption of an overtime that does not allow ties, the 14–14 tie with LSU remains the last official tie in school history.

== Schedule ==
Date	Time	Opponent	Rank	Site	TV	Result	Attendance	Source
September 2	7:00 p.m.	at Georgia		Sanford Stadium; Athens, GA (rivalry)	ABC	W 20–16	81,277	
September 14	6:45 p.m.	Texas A&M*	No. 20	Legion Field; Birmingham, AL	ESPN	W 23–10	74,697	
September 21	1:30 p.m.	Cincinnati*	No. 16	Bryant–Denny Stadium; Tuscaloosa, AL	PPV	W 45–10	58,714	
September 28	11:30 a.m.	at Vanderbilt	No. 15	Vanderbilt Stadium; Nashville, TN	WTBS	W 40–20	41,186	
October 12	2:30 p.m.	at No. 8 Penn State*	No. 10	Beaver Stadium; University Park, PA (rivalry)	ABC	L 17–19	85,444	
October 19	11:30 a.m.	No. 20 Tennessee	No. 15	Legion Field; Birmingham, AL (Third Saturday in October)	WTBS	L 14–16	75,808	
October 26	1:30 p.m.	at Memphis State*		Liberty Bowl Memorial Stadium; Memphis, TN	PPV	W 28–9	37,609	
November 2	1:30 p.m.	Mississippi State^{†}		Bryant–Denny Stadium; Tuscaloosa, AL (rivalry)		W 44–28	60,210	
November 9	2:30 p.m.	at No. 15 LSU	No. 20	Tiger Stadium; Baton Rouge, LA (rivalry)	ABC	T 14–14	76,772	
November 16	1:30 p.m.	Southern Miss*	No. 20	Bryant–Denny Stadium; Tuscaloosa, AL		W 24–13	58,714	
November 30	2:30 p.m.	vs. No. 7 Auburn		Legion Field; Birmingham, AL (Iron Bowl)	ABC	W 25–23	75,808	
December 28	7:00 p.m.	vs. USC*	No. 13	Aloha Stadium; Halawa, HI (Aloha Bowl)	ISN	W 24–3	35,183	
*Non-conference game; ^{†}Homecoming; Rankings from AP Poll released prior to the game; All times are in Central time

== Rankings ==
Ranking movements Legend: ██ Increase in ranking ██ Decrease in ranking — = Not ranked
	Week																
Poll	Pre	1	2	3	4	5	6	7	8	9	10	11	12	13	14	15	Final
AP	—	—	20	16	15	12	10	15	—	—	20	20	—	—	15	15	13
Coaches	—		16	12	10	8	8	14	—	20	20	—	—	—	14	14	14

== Game summaries ==
=== Texas A&M ===
Team	1	2	3	4	Total
Aggies	0	3	7	0	10
• No. 20 Crimson Tide	7	3	0	13	23

- Date: September 14
- Location: Legion Field
- Game attendance: 74,697
- Television network: ESPN

Scoring summary
1		ALA	Chester Braggs 2-yard run (Van Tiffin kick)	ALA 7–0
2	2:46	A&M	Eric Franklin 20-yard field goal	ALA 7–3
2		ALA	Van Tiffin 57-yard field goal	ALA 10–3
3		A&M	Anthony Toney 1-yard run (kick)	Tied 10–10
4	11:15	ALA	Van Kiffin 40-yard field goal	ALA 13–10
4		ALA	Van Kiffin 51-yard field goal	ALA 16–10
4	1:07	ALA	Craig Turner 32-yard run (Tiffin kick)	ALA 23–10

=== At LSU ===
Alabama at LSU

Team	1	2	3	4	Total
No. 20 Crimson Tide	7	0	0	7	14
No. 15 Tigers	0	0	14	0	14

- Date: November 9
- Location:
  Tiger Stadium,
  Baton Rouge, Louisiana
- Game start: 2:30 p.m. CST
- Game attendance: 76,772
- Referee: Joe Hicks
- TV announcers (ABC Sports): Keith Jackson, Frank Broyles, and Tim Brant

Scoring summary
1	7:57	BAMA	Gene Jelks 34-yard run (Van Tiffin kick)	Alabama 7–0
3	14:06	LSU	Garry James 49-yard run (Ron Lewis kick)	Tied 7–7
3	10:12	LSU	Wendell Davis 67-yard pass from Jeff Wickersham (Lewis kick)	LSU 14–7
4	1:23		Gene Jelks 3-yard pass to Mike Shula (Tiffin kick)	Tied 14–14

=== Vs. Auburn ===
Team	1	2	3	4	Total
• Crimson Tide	10	6	0	9	25
No. 7 Tigers	0	10	0	13	23

- Date: November 30
- Location: Legion Field
- Game attendance: 75,808

Scoring summary
Q1		ALA	Turner 1-yard run (Tiffin kick)	ALA 7–0
Q1		ALA	Tiffin 26-yard field goal	ALA 10–0
Q2		ALA	Tiffin 32-yard field goal	ALA 13–0
Q2		AUB	Jackson 7-yard run (Johnson kick)	ALA 13–7
Q2		ALA	Tiffin 42-yard field goal	ALA 16–7
Q2		AUB	Johnson 49-yard field goal	ALA 16–10
Q4		AUB	Jackson 1-yard run (Johnson kick)	AUB 17–16
Q4		ALA	Jelks 74-yard run (pass failed)	ALA 22–17
Q4	:57	AUB	Ware 1-yard run (run failed)	AUB 23–22
Q4	:00	ALA	Tiffin 52-yard field goal	ALA 25–23

Van Tiffin kicked his fourth field goal of the game, from 52 yards out, as time expired to give Alabama the Iron Bowl victory.

== Roster ==
1985 Alabama Crimson Tide football team roster
Players
Coaches
Offense

Pos.	#	Name	Class
WR	1	Albert Bell	Jr
TE	85	Howard Cross	Fr
RB	26	Bobby Humphrey	Fr
RB	22	Gene Jelks	Fr
WR	17	Bennie Magee	Fr
QB	11	Mike Shula	Jr

Defense

Pos.	#	Name	Class
LB	97	Cornelius Bennett	Jr
CB	36	Chris Goode	So
LB	55	Derrick Thomas	Fr

Special teams

Pos.	#	Name	Class
P	5	Chris Mohr	Fr
K	3	Van Tiffin	Jr

Head coach

- Ray Perkins

Coordinators/assistant coaches

Legend

- (C) Team captain
- (S) Suspended
- (I) Ineligible
- Injured
- Redshirt
