= 1986 USFL territorial draft =

General information
- Date: April 23, 1986

Overview
- League: USFL

The 1986 USFL territorial draft was the fourth and last territorial draft of the United States Football League (USFL). It took place on April 23, 1986.

== Player selections ==
= All-Star
= USFL MVP

USFL team	Player	Position	College
Arizona Outlaws	Harvey Allen	S	UNLV
Arizona Outlaws	Vince Amoia	RB	Arizona State
Arizona Outlaws	Greg Battle	LB	Arizona State
Arizona Outlaws	Darryl Clack	RB	Arizona State
Arizona Outlaws	Randy Cook	LB	Northern Arizona
Arizona Outlaws	Robert Cox	OT	UCLA
Arizona Outlaws	Mike Crawford	RB	Arizona State
Arizona Outlaws	Tony Curtis	WR	New Mexico State
Arizona Outlaws	Ron Drake	C	UNLV
Arizona Outlaws	John Dubose	OG	Arizona
Arizona Outlaws	Allan Durden	S	Arizona
Arizona Outlaws	David Fonoti	OT	Arizona State
Arizona Outlaws	Paul Godbey	OT	UNLV
Arizona Outlaws	Mike Hartmeier	OG	UCLA
Arizona Outlaws	Darryl Knox	WR	Arizona State
Arizona Outlaws	John Lee	K	UCLA
Arizona Outlaws	Tony Lewis	RB	UNLV
Arizona Outlaws	David Norrie	QB	UCLA
Arizona Outlaws	Billy Robinson	LB	Arizona State
Arizona Outlaws	Mike Sherrard	WR	UCLA
Arizona Outlaws	Tommy Taylor	LB	UCLA
Arizona Outlaws	Craig Vesling	LB	Arizona
Arizona Outlaws	Mark Walen	DT	UCLA
Arizona Outlaws	Gentry Walsh	WR	UCLA
Arizona Outlaws	Max Zendejas	K	Arizona
Baltimore Stars	Rogers Alexander	LB	Penn State
Baltimore Stars	Rick Badanjek	RB	Maryland
Baltimore Stars	Tommy Barnhardt	P	North Carolina
Baltimore Stars	Rennie Benn	WR	Lehigh University
Baltimore Stars	Todd Bowles	S	Temple
Baltimore Stars	Donald Brown	S	Maryland
Baltimore Stars	Carl Carr	LB	North Carolina
Baltimore Stars	Brad Cochran	CB	Michigan
Baltimore Stars	Eric Coss	C	Penn State
Baltimore Stars	Dean DiMidio	TE	Penn State
Baltimore Stars	Tony Edwards	OT	Maryland
Baltimore Stars	Stan Gelbaugh	QB	Maryland
Baltimore Stars	Larry Griffin	S	North Carolina
Baltimore Stars	Mike Hammerstein	DT	Michigan
Baltimore Stars	Jeff Holinka	OG	Maryland
Baltimore Stars	Eric Kattus	TE	Michigan
Baltimore Stars	J. D. Maarleveld	OT	Maryland
Baltimore Stars	Mike Mallory	LB	Michigan
Baltimore Stars	Todd Moules	OG	Penn State
Baltimore Stars	John Rienstra	OG	Temple
Baltimore Stars	Jeff Rosen	OG	Delaware
Baltimore Stars	Kip Schenefelt	P	Temple
Baltimore Stars	Earl Winfield	WR	North Carolina
Baltimore Stars	Lloyd Yancey	OT	Temple
Baltimore Stars	Mike Zordich	S	Penn State
Birmingham Stallions	Kent Austin	QB	Mississippi
Birmingham Stallions	Lewis Billups	CB	North Alabama
Birmingham Stallions	Steve Bogdalek	OG	Michigan State
Birmingham Stallions	Lewis Colbert	P	Auburn
Birmingham Stallions	Jon Hand	DE	Alabama
Birmingham Stallions	Anthony Henton	LB	Troy State
Birmingham Stallions	Bo Jackson	RB	Auburn
Birmingham Stallions	Bruce Jones	S	North Alabama
Birmingham Stallions	Ron Middleton	TE	Duke
Birmingham Stallions	Jeff Parks	TE	Auburn
Birmingham Stallions	Phillip Parker	S	Michigan State
Birmingham Stallions	Benton Reed	DE	Mississippi
Birmingham Stallions	Larry Roberts	DE	Alabama
Birmingham Stallions	Gerald Robinson	DE	Auburn
Birmingham Stallions	Brent Sowell	DT	Alabama
Birmingham Stallions	Randy Stokes	OG	Auburn
Birmingham Stallions	William Tolbert	LB	Alabama State
Birmingham Stallions	Craig Turner	RB	Alabama
Birmingham Stallions	Steve Wallace	OT	Auburn
Birmingham Stallions	Jimmie Warren	S	Auburn
Birmingham Stallions	Gerald Williams	DE	Auburn
Birmingham Stallions	Lavoris Winfrey	LB	Alabama State
Birmingham Stallions	Billy Witt	DE	North Alabama
Birmingham Stallions	John Wojciechowski	OT	Michigan State
Birmingham Stallions	Nathan Wonsley	RB	Mississippi
Jacksonville Bulls	Dave Adams	OT	Duke
Jacksonville Bulls	Peter Anderson	OG	Georgia
Jacksonville Bulls	Wayne Asberry	S	Texas A&M
Jacksonville Bulls	Darrel Austin	S	Texas A&M
Jacksonville Bulls	Clemmle Blackman	DE	Morris Brown
Jacksonville Bulls	Stanley Blalock	WR	Georgia
Jacksonville Bulls	Domingo Bryant	S	Texas A&M
Jacksonville Bulls	Leonard Burton	C	South Carolina
Jacksonville Bulls	Vince Evans	RB	North Carolina State
Jacksonville Bulls	Mark Franklin	LB	North Carolina State
Jacksonville Bulls	Don Herron	LB	North Carolina State
Jacksonville Bulls	John Ivemever	OT	Georgia Tech
Jacksonville Bulls	Lance Jackson	LB	Texas A&M
Jacksonville Bulls	Tron Jackson	RB	Georgia
Jacksonville Bulls	Joe Milinichik	OT	North Carolina State
Jacksonville Bulls	Mark Pike	LB	Georgia Tech
Jacksonville Bulls	Ted Roof	LB	Georgia Tech
Jacksonville Bulls	Warded Sims	LB	Morris Brown
Jacksonville Bulls	Reggie Singletary	DE	North Carolina State
Jacksonville Bulls	Pat Swilling	LB	Georgia Tech
Jacksonville Bulls	Anthony Toney	RB	Texas A&M
Jacksonville Bulls	Brian Walter	OG	Duke
Jacksonville Bulls	Doug Williams	OT	Texas A&M
Jacksonville Bulls	Mike Willis	S	Georgia
Jacksonville Bulls	Barry Word	RB	Virginia
Memphis Showboats	Brian Blankenship	OT	Nebraska
Memphis Showboats	Ravin Caldwell	LB	Arkansas
Memphis Showboats	Daryl Dickey	QB	Tennessee
Memphis Showboats	David Douglas	OG	Tennessee
Memphis Showboats	David East	C	Memphis
Memphis Showboats	Bobby Joe Edmonds	RB	Arkansas
Memphis Showboats	Eric Fairs	LB	Memphis
Memphis Showboats	Don Griffin	CB	Middle Tennessee State
Memphis Showboats	Tim Harris	DE	Memphis
Memphis Showboats	Gary Hunt	S	Memphis
Memphis Showboats	Enis Jackson	CB	Memphis
Memphis Showboats	Bill Lewis	C	Nebraska
Memphis Showboats	Rueben Mayes	RB	Washington State
Memphis Showboats	Tim McGee	WR	Tennessee
Memphis Showboats	Carl Miller	RB	Arkansas
Memphis Showboats	Nick Miller	LB	Arkansas
Memphis Showboats	Tom Rathman	FB	Nebraska
Memphis Showboats	Gilbert Renfroe	QB	Tennessee State
Memphis Showboats	Dan Sparkman	QB	Memphis
Memphis Showboats	Eric Swanson	WR	Tennessee
Memphis Showboats	Andy Upchurch	C	Arkansas
Memphis Showboats	Steve Wade	DT	Vanderbilt
Memphis Showboats	Jeff Walker	OT	Memphis
Memphis Showboats	Chris White	K	Illinois
Memphis Showboats	Will Wolford	OT	Vanderbilt
Memphis Showboats	Kevin Wyatt	S	Arkansas
New Jersey Generals	Ricky Adams	LB	Oklahoma State
New Jersey Generals	Paul Blair	OT	Oklahoma State
New Jersey Generals	Bob Brotzki	OT	Syracuse
New Jersey Generals	Derek Burton	OG	Oklahoma State
New Jersey Generals	Elvis Butler	DT	Mississippi State
New Jersey Generals	Keith Byars	RB	Ohio State
New Jersey Generals	Leon Cannon	LB	Mississippi State
New Jersey Generals	Joe Cormier	TE	USC
New Jersey Generals	James FitzPatrick	OT	USC
New Jersey Generals	Rory Graves	OT	Ohio State
New Jersey Generals	Tim Green	DE	Syracuse
New Jersey Generals	James Ham	LB	Oklahoma State
New Jersey Generals	Thomas Johnson	LB	Ohio State
New Jersey Generals	Jerry Kimmel	OG	Syracuse
New Jersey Generals	Mike Lanese	WR	Ohio State
New Jersey Generals	Byron Lee	LB	Ohio State
New Jersey Generals	Zeph Lee	RB	USC
New Jersey Generals	Doug Marrone	OT	Syracuse
New Jersey Generals	Jeff Nelson	WR	Texas A&M
New Jersey Generals	Leslie O'Neal	DE	Oklahoma State
New Jersey Generals	Harry Roberts	LB	Oklahoma
New Jersey Generals	Anthony Sagnella	DT	Rutgers
New Jersey Generals	Sean Salisbury	QB	USC
New Jersey Generals	Mike Siano	WR	Syracuse
New Jersey Generals	Patrick Swoopes	DT	Mississippi State
New Jersey Generals	John Washington	DT	Oklahoma State
Orlando Renegades	Greg Atterberry	S	Central Florida
Orlando Renegades	Pat Ballage	S	Notre Dame
Orlando Renegades	Cap Boso	TE	Illinois
Orlando Renegades	Topper Clemons	RB	Wake Forest
Orlando Renegades	Tom Doerger	OG	Notre Dame
Orlando Renegades	Jim Dombrowski	OT	Virginia
Orlando Renegades	Eric Dorsey	DT	Notre Dame
Orlando Renegades	Kevin Fagan	DE	Miami
Orlando Renegades	Bruce Fleming	LB	Miami
Orlando Renegades	Tony Furjanic	LB	Notre Dame
Orlando Renegades	Harold Garren	C	Virginia
Orlando Renegades	Jim Huddleston	OG	Virginia
Orlando Renegades	Jim Juriga	OG	Illinois
Orlando Renegades	Terry Nichols	DE	South Carolina State
Orlando Renegades	Allen Pinkett	RB	Notre Dame
Orlando Renegades	Michael Ramseur	RB	Wake Forest
Orlando Renegades	Thomas Rooks	RB	Illinois
Orlando Renegades	Tim Scannel	OG	Notre Dame
Orlando Renegades	Craig Swoope	S	Illinois
Orlando Renegades	Mark Tagart	LB	Illinois
Orlando Renegades	Guy Teafatiller	DT	Illinois
Orlando Renegades	David Williams	WR	Illinois
Tampa Bay Bandits	Sebastian Brown	WR	Bethune-Cookman
Tampa Bay Bandits	Jamie Dukes	OG	Florida State
Tampa Bay Bandits	Sam Garland	OT	Florida
Tampa Bay Bandits	James Graham	RB	Bethune-Cookman
Tampa Bay Bandits	King Green	RB	Bethune-Cookman
Tampa Bay Bandits	Percy Griffin	OG	Florida A&M
Tampa Bay Bandits	Dalton Hilliard	RB	LSU
Tampa Bay Bandits	John Ionata	OT	Florida State
Tampa Bay Bandits	Garry James	RB	LSU
Tampa Bay Bandits	Garth Jax	LB	Florida State
Tampa Bay Bandits	Cletis Jones	RB	Florida State
Tampa Bay Bandits	Hassan Jones	WR	Florida State
Tampa Bay Bandits	Ray McDonald	WR	Florida
Tampa Bay Bandits	Alonzo Mitz	DT	Florida
Tampa Bay Bandits	Leon Pennington	LB	Florida
Tampa Bay Bandits	Stanley Scott	DT	Florida State
Tampa Bay Bandits	Tony Smith	RB	Florida State
Tampa Bay Bandits	Jesse Solomon	LB	Florida State
Tampa Bay Bandits	Curtis Stacey	S	Florida
Tampa Bay Bandits	Eric Thomas	QB	Florida State
Tampa Bay Bandits	Jack Trudeau	QB	Illinois
Tampa Bay Bandits	Jeff Wickersham	QB	LSU
Tampa Bay Bandits	John L. Williams	FB	Florida
Tampa Bay Bandits	Billy Wilson	WR	Florida A&M
