= 1985 Aloha Bowl =

American college football game

USC Trojans	Alabama Crimson Tide
(6–5)	(8–2–1)
3	24
Head coach: Ted Tollner	Head coach: Ray Perkins
	AP / Coaches; 15 / 14
	1	2	3	4	Total
USC	0	3	0	0	3
Alabama	3	0	7	14	24
- Date: December 28, 1985
- Season: 1985
- Stadium: Aloha Stadium
- Location: Honolulu, Hawaii
- MVP: Gene Jelks (Offense); Cornelius Bennett (Defense)
- Referee: Dixon Holman (SWC)
- Attendance: 35,183

United States TV coverage
- Network: Innovative Sports
- Announcers: Harry Kalas, Dennis Green and Gus Hergert

The 1985 Aloha Bowl, part of the 1985 bowl game season, took place on December 28, 1985, at Aloha Stadium in Honolulu, Hawaii. The competing teams were the Alabama Crimson Tide, representing the Southeastern Conference (SEC), and the USC Trojans of the Pacific-10 Conference (Pac-10). Alabama was victorious in by a final score of 24–3. Alabama running back Gene Jelks and linebacker Cornelius Bennett were named the game's co-MVPs.

== Teams ==
=== Alabama ===
The 1985 Alabama squad finished the regular season with losses to Penn State and Tennessee and a tie against LSU to compile an 8–2–1 record. Following their victory over Auburn, the Crimson Tide accepted an invitation to play in the Aloha Bowl on November 30 after Tennessee defeated Vanderbilt to clinch a berth in the 1986 Sugar Bowl. The appearance marked the first for Alabama in the Aloha Bowl, and their 38th overall bowl game.

=== USC ===
The 1985 USC squad finished the regular season with losses to Baylor, Arizona State, Notre Dame, California and Washington to finish with a record of 6–5. Following their victory over UCLA, the Trojans accepted an invitation to play in the Aloha Bowl on November 25. The appearance marked the first for USC in the Aloha Bowl, and their 29th overall bowl game.

== Game summary ==
In a first half dominated by both defenses, both the Crimson Tide and the Trojans traded field goals resulting in a 3–3 tie at the half. Van Tiffin hit a 48-yard shot in the first for Alabama and Don Shafer hit a 24-yard shot in the second quarter. Craig Turner scored the first touchdown of the contest on a 1-yard run to complete a 10-play, 58-yard drive in the third quarter. The Crimson Tide closed out the game with a pair of fourth-quarter touchdowns. The first came on a 24-yard pass from Mike Shula to Clay Whitehurst and the second on a 14-yard Al Bell run. For their performances, running back Gene Jelks and linebacker Cornelius Bennett were named the game's co-MVPs.

Scoring summary

Quarter	Time	Drive			Team	Scoring information	Score	
Quarter	Time	Plays	Yards	TOP	Team	Scoring information	USC	Alabama
1	6:05		54 yards		Alabama	48-yard field goal by Van Tiffin	0	3
2	9:36		55 yards		USC	24-yard field goal by Don Shafer	3	3
3	4:03		10 plays, 58 yards		Alabama	Craig Turner 1-yard touchdown run, Van Tiffin kick good	3	10
4	13:24		44 yards		Alabama	Clay Whitehurst 24-yard touchdown reception from Mike Shula, Van Tiffin kick good	3	17
4	8:25		7 plays, 56 yards		Alabama	Al Bell 14-yard touchdown run, Van Tiffin kick good	3	24
"TOP" = time of possession. For other American football terms, see Glossary of American football.							3	24
