= 1985 LSU Tigers football team =

American college football season

1985 LSU Tigers football

Liberty Bowl, L 7–21 vs. Baylor
- Conference: Southeastern Conference

Ranking
- Coaches: No. 20
- AP: No. 20
- Record: 9–2–1 (4–1–1 SEC)
- Head coach: Bill Arnsparger (2nd season)
- Offensive coordinator: Ed Zaunbrecher (2nd season)
- Offensive scheme: Multiple
- Defensive coordinator: Mike Archer (1st season)
- Base defense: 3–4
- Home stadium: Tiger Stadium

1985 Southeastern Conference football standings
	Conf.					Overall
Team	W		L		T	W		L		T
No. 4 Tennessee $	5	–	1	–	0	9	–	1	–	2
No. 5 Florida	5	–	1	–	0	9	–	1	–	1
No. 13 Alabama	4	–	1	–	1	9	–	2	–	1
No. 20 LSU	4	–	1	–	1	9	–	2	–	1
Georgia	3	–	2	–	1	7	–	3	–	2
Auburn	3	–	3	–	0	8	–	4	–	0
Ole Miss	2	–	4	–	0	4	–	6	–	1
Vanderbilt	1	–	4	–	1	3	–	7	–	1
Kentucky	1	–	5	–	0	5	–	6	–	0
Mississippi State	0	–	6	–	0	5	–	6	–	0
$ – Conference champion; Florida ineligible for SEC championship due to NCAA probation.; Rankings from AP Poll

The 1985 LSU Tigers football team represented Louisiana State University (LSU) as a member of the Southeastern Conference (SEC) during the 1985 NCAA Division I-A football season. Led by second-year head coach Bill Arnsparger, the Tigers compiled an overall record of 9–2–1, with a mark of 4–1–1 in conference play, and finished fourth in the SEC.

== Schedule ==
Date	Time	Opponent	Rank	Site	TV	Result	Attendance	Source
September 14	12:00 p.m.	at North Carolina*	No. 12	Kenan Memorial Stadium; Chapel Hill, NC	TigerVision	W 23–13	50,866	
September 21	7:00 p.m.	Colorado State*	No. 9	Tiger Stadium; Baton Rouge, LA	TigerVision	W 17–3	78,491	
October 5	7:00 p.m.	No. 11 Florida	No. 8	Tiger Stadium; Baton Rouge, LA (rivalry)	TigerVision	L 0–20	78,598	
October 12	6:00 p.m.	at Vanderbilt	No. 20	Vanderbilt Stadium; Nashville, TN	TigerVision	W 49–7	40,962	
October 19	6:30 p.m.	Kentucky^{†}	No. 17	Tiger Stadium; Baton Rouge, LA	ESPN	W 10–0	78,562	
November 2	11:30 a.m.	at Ole Miss	No. 16	Mississippi Veterans Memorial Stadium; Jackson, MS (rivalry)	TBS	W 14–0	45,000	
November 9	2:50 p.m.	No. 20 Alabama	No. 15	Tiger Stadium; Baton Rouge, LA (rivalry)	ABC	T 14–14	76,772	
November 16	7:00 p.m.	Mississippi State	No. 19	Tiger Stadium; Baton Rouge, LA (rivalry)	TigerVision	W 17–15	76,099	
November 23	11:30 a.m.	at Notre Dame*	No. 17	Notre Dame Stadium; Notre Dame, IN	USA	W 10–7	59,075	
November 30	7:30 p.m.	at Tulane*	No. 13	Louisiana Superdome; New Orleans, LA (Battle for the Rag)	TigerVision	W 31–19	64,194	
December 7	7:00 p.m.	East Carolina*	No. 12	Tiger Stadium; Baton Rouge, LA	TigerVision	W 35–15	65,660	
December 27	7:00 p.m.	vs. Baylor*	No. 12	Liberty Bowl Memorial Stadium; Memphis, TN (Liberty Bowl)	Katz	L 7–21	40,186	
*Non-conference game; ^{†}Homecoming; Rankings from AP Poll released prior to the game; All times are in Central time

== Rankings ==
Ranking movements Legend: ██ Increase in ranking ██ Decrease in ranking
	Week																
Poll	Pre	1	2	3	4	5	6	7	8	9	10	11	12	13	14	15	Final
AP	13	13	12	9	8	8	20	17	18	15	16	19	17	13	12	12	20
Coaches	11	11	10	9	8	9	19	17	18	15	13	18	17	12	10	10	20

== Game summaries ==
=== At North Carolina ===
LSU at North Carolina

Team	1	2	3	4	Total
• No. 12 Tigers	7	6	3	7	23
Tar Heels	7	6	0	0	13

- Date: September 14
- Location:
  Kenan Memorial Stadium,
  Chapel Hill, North Carolina

Scoring summary
1	13:14	UNC	Brad Lopp 2-yard run (Lee Gliarmis kick)	UNC 7–0
1	4:04	LSU	Dalton Hilliard 1-yard run (Ron Lewis kick)	Tied 7–7
2		UNC	Brad Lopp 5-yard pass from Kevin Anthony (Gliarmis kick blocked)	UNC 13–7
2		LSU	Rogee Magee 12-yard pass from Jeff Wickersham (conversion failed)	Tied 13–13
3		LSU	Ron Lewis 54-yard field goal	LSU 16–13
4	12:20	LSU	Dalton Hilliard 3-yard run (Lewis kick)	LSU 23–13

Dalton Hilliard ran for 2 touchdowns and Ron Lewis kicked a school-record 54-yard field goal.

=== Alabama ===
Alabama at LSU

Team	1	2	3	4	Total
No. 20 Crimson Tide	7	0	0	7	14
No. 15 Tigers	0	0	14	0	14

- Date: November 9
- Location:
  Tiger Stadium,
  Baton Rouge, Louisiana
- Game start: 2:30 p.m. CST
- Game attendance: 76,772
- Referee: Joe Hicks
- TV announcers (ABC Sports): Keith Jackson, Frank Broyles, and Tim Brant

Scoring summary
1	7:57	BAMA	Gene Jelks 34-yard run (Van Tiffin kick)	Alabama 7–0
3	14:06	LSU	Garry James 49-yard run (Ron Lewis kick)	Tied 7–7
3	10:12	LSU	Wendell Davis 67-yard pass from Jeff Wickersham (Lewis kick)	LSU 14–7
4	1:23		Gene Jelks 3-yard pass to Mike Shula (Tiffin kick)	Tied 14–14

=== At Notre Dame ===
LSU at Notre Dame

Team	1	2	3	4	Total
• No. 17 Tigers	0	3	0	7	10
Fighting Irish	7	0	0	0	7

- Date: November 23
- Location:
  Notre Dame Stadium,
  South Bend, Indiana
- Game attendance: 59,075
- Referee: Raymond Bower
- TV announcers: Harry Kalas and Jack Ham

Scoring summary
1	9:26	ND	Tim Brown 18-yard run (John Carney kick)	ND 7–0
2	0:00	LSU	Matt DeFrank 27-yard field goal	ND 7–3
4	3:26		Garry James 2-yard run (Ron Lewis kick)	LSU 10–7

=== Vs. Baylor (Liberty Bowl) ===
Team	1	2	3	4	Total
No. 12 Tigers	7	0	0	0	7
• Bears	7	3	3	8	21

- Date: December 27
- Location: Liberty Bowl Memorial Stadium
  Memphis, Tennessee
- Game attendance: 40,186
- Referee: Otho Kortz
- TV announcers (Raycom Sports): Merle Harmon (play-by-play), Bud Wilkinson (analyst) and Kevin Kiley (sportscaster) (sidelines)

Scoring summary
1	LSU	Norman Jefferson 79-yard punt return (Ron Lewis kick)	LSU 7–0
1	Baylor	Matt Clark 5-yard pass from Tom Muecke (Terry Syler kick)	Tied 7–7
2	Baylor	Terry Syler 23-yard field goal	Baylor 10–7
3	Baylor	Terry Syler 35-yard field goal	Baylor 13–7
4	Baylor	John Simpson 15-yard pass from Cody Carlson (Matt Clark pass from Cody Carlson)	Baylor 21–7

== Roster ==
1985 LSU Tigers football team roster
Players
Coaches
Offense

Pos.	#	Name	Class
QB	5	Jeff Wickersham	Sr
QB	17	Tommy Hodson	Fr
RB	21	Dalton Hilliard	Sr
RB	23	Sammy Martin	So
RB	33	Garry James	Sr
TE	49	Brian Kinchen	So
C	56	Nacho Albergamo	So
OT	63	Curt Gore	Sr
G	66	Keith Melancon	Jr
OT	75	John Hazard	Jr
G	76	Eric Andolsek	So
WR	80	Rogie Magee	So
WR	82	Wendell Davis	So
TE	83	Mitch Andrews	Sr
TE	89	Karl Dunbar	Fr

Defense

Pos.	#	Name	Class
DE	77	Roland Barbay	Jr
LB	94	Michael Brooks	Jr
CB	12	Norman Jefferson	Jr

Special teams

Pos.	#	Name	Class
P	3	Matt DeFrank	So
K	8	Ron Lewis	So

Head coach

- Bill Arnsparger

Coordinators/assistant coaches

- Ed Zaunbrecher – Offensive coordinator/quarterbacks
- Jesse Daigle – Running backs
- Jerry Sullivan – Wide receivers
- Terry Lewis – Tight ends
- Pete Mangurian – Offensive line
- Mike Archer – Defensive coordinator/defensive backs
- Pete Jenkins – Defensive line
- Kurt Schottenheimer – Linebackers
- John Symank – Linebackers/recruiting coordinator

Legend

- (C) Team captain
- (S) Suspended
- (I) Ineligible
- Injured
- Redshirt

Roster

== 1986 NFL draft ==
Player	Position	Round	Pick	NFL club
Garry James	Running back	2	29	Detroit Lions
Dalton Hilliard	Running back	2	31	New Orleans Saints
Jeff Wickersham	Quarterback	10	274	Miami Dolphins
