= List of professional American football drafts =

The National Football League draft, also called the NFL draft or (officially) the Player Selection Meeting, is an annual event which serves as the league's most common source of player recruitment. It is the largest of several such arrangements for different leagues in the sport of American football, listed below, both proball and college football . Many no longer take place. Their detailed methods vary, but the NFL draft can serve as an example. The Canadian college draft and American Football League draft are others.

In the NFL draft, each team is given a position in the drafting order in reverse order relative to its record in the previous year, which means that the last place team is positioned first and the Super Bowl champion is last. From this position, the team can either select a player or trade its position to another team for other draft positions, a player or players, or any combination thereof. The round is complete when each team has either selected a player or traded its position in the draft. The first draft was held in 1936, and has been held every year since.

Certain aspects of the draft, including team positioning and the number of rounds in the draft, have been revised since its creation in 1936, but the fundamental method has remained the same. Currently, the draft consists of seven rounds. The original rationale in creating the draft was to increase the competitive parity between the teams as the worst team would, ideally, be able to choose the best player available. In the early years of the draft, players were chosen based on hearsay, print media, or other rudimentary evidence of ability. In the 1940s, some franchises began employing full-time scouts. The ensuing success of these teams eventually forced the other franchises to also hire scouts.

The NFL-defined name of the process has changed since its inception. The location of the draft has continually changed over the years to accommodate more fans, as the event has gained popularity. The draft's popularity now garners prime-time television coverage. In the league's early years, from the mid-1930s to the mid-1960s, the draft was held in various cities with NFL franchises until the league settled on New York City starting in 1965, where it remained for fifty years until 2015, when future draft locations started being determined through a yearly bidding process.

== All-America Football Conference ==
Collegiate: 1947 1948 1949

== All American Football League ==
Professional: 2008

== Alliance of American Football ==
Professional: 2019

== American Football League ==
Collegiate: 1960 1961 1962 1963 1964 1965 1966

== National Football League ==
Collegiate: 1936 1937 1938 1939 1940 1941 1942 1943 1944 1945 1946 1947 1948 1949 1950 1951 1952 1953 1954 1955 1956 1957 1958 1959 1960 1961 1962 1963 1964 1965 1966 1967 1968 1969 1970 1971 1972 1973 1974 1975 1976 1977 1978 1979 1980 1981 1982 1983 1984 1985 1986 1987 1988 1989 1990 1991 1992 1993 1994 1995 1996 1997 1998 1999 2000 2001 2002 2003 2004 2005 2006 2007 2008 2009 2010 2011 2012 2013 2014 2015 2016 2017 2018 2019 2020 2021 2022 2023 2024 2025

Expansion: 1960 1961 1966 1967 1976 1995 1999 2002

Supplemental: 1950 1984

== United Football League (2009–2012) ==
Professional: 2009 2010 2011;

== United Football League (2024– ) ==
Dispersal: 2024 2026

Collegiate: 2024

== United States Football League (1983–1985) ==
Collegiate: 1983 1984 1985 1986 Territorial: 1983 1984 1985 1986

== United States Football League (2022–2023) ==
2022 2023

== World Football League ==
Collegiate: 1974
Professional: 1974 1975

== XFL ==
Professional: 2001 2020 2023 2024
