= 1985 Ole Miss Rebels football team =

American college football season

1985 Ole Miss Rebels football
- Conference: Southeastern Conference
- Record: 4–6–1 (2–4 SEC)
- Head coach: Billy Brewer (3rd season)
- Offensive coordinator: Robert McGraw (3rd season)
- Defensive coordinator: Carl Torbush (3rd season)
- Home stadium: Vaught–Hemingway Stadium; Mississippi Veterans Memorial Stadium

1985 Southeastern Conference football standings
	Conf.					Overall
Team	W		L		T	W		L		T
No. 4 Tennessee $	5	–	1	–	0	9	–	1	–	2
No. 5 Florida	5	–	1	–	0	9	–	1	–	1
No. 13 Alabama	4	–	1	–	1	9	–	2	–	1
No. 20 LSU	4	–	1	–	1	9	–	2	–	1
Georgia	3	–	2	–	1	7	–	3	–	2
Auburn	3	–	3	–	0	8	–	4	–	0
Ole Miss	2	–	4	–	0	4	–	6	–	1
Vanderbilt	1	–	4	–	1	3	–	7	–	1
Kentucky	1	–	5	–	0	5	–	6	–	0
Mississippi State	0	–	6	–	0	5	–	6	–	0
$ – Conference champion; Florida ineligible for SEC championship due to NCAA probation.; Rankings from AP Poll

The 1985 Ole Miss Rebels football team represented the University of Mississippi (Ole Miss) as a member of the Southeastern Conference (SEC) during the 1985 NCAA Division I-A football season. Led by third-year head coach Billy Brewer, the Rebels compiled an overall record of 4–6–1, with a mark of 2–4 in conference play, and finished seventh in the SEC. It was the second consecutive losing season for Ole Miss, duplicating their record from the previous year.

== Schedule ==
Date	Opponent	Site	Result	Attendance	Source
September 7	at Memphis State*	Liberty Bowl Memorial Stadium; Memphis, TN (rivalry)	T 17–17	50,936	
September 14	No. 14 Arkansas*	Mississippi Veterans Memorial Stadium; Jackson, MS (rivalry)	L 19–24	52,110	
September 21	Arkansas State*	Vaught–Hemingway Stadium; Oxford, MS	W 18–16	29,912	
September 28	at Tulane*	Louisiana Superdome; New Orleans, LA (rivalry)	W 27–10	32,578	
October 5	at No. 14 Auburn	Jordan-Hare Stadium; Auburn, AL (rivalry)	L 0–41	67,500	
October 12	No. 18 Georgia	Mississippi Veterans Memorial Stadium; Jackson, MS	L 21–49	35,000	
October 26	Vanderbilt	Vaught–Hemingway Stadium; Oxford, MS (rivalry)	W 35–7	35,500	
November 2	No. 16 LSU	Mississippi Veterans Memorial Stadium; Jackson, MS (rivalry)	L 0–14	45,000	
November 9	at Notre Dame*	Notre Dame Stadium; Notre Dame, IN	L 14–37	59,075	
November 16	at No. 18 Tennessee	Neyland Stadium; Knoxville, TN (rivalry)	L 14–34	92,482	
November 23	vs. Mississippi State	Mississippi Veterans Memorial Stadium; Jackson, MS (Egg Bowl)	W 45–27	48,705	
*Non-conference game; Rankings from AP Poll released prior to the game

== Personnel ==
1985 Ole Miss Rebels football team roster
Players
Coaches
Offense

Pos.	#	Name	Class
WR		J.R. Ambrose
QB		Kent Austin
RB		Johnny Boatman
OL		Bobby Clark
RB		Chuck Cleveland
OL		Ross Genovese
RB		Willie Goodloe
RB		Antonio Harris
WR		Jamie Holder
OL		Todd Irvin
WR		Daren Johnson
TE		Steve Joyner
TE		Greg Lee
QB		David McKinney
RB		Joe Mickles
WR		Ricky Myers
QB		Chris Osgood
TE		Mario Perry
OL		Tony Rayburn
WR		Andree Rodgers
OL		Nubin Ross
OL		Jay Schimmel
TE		Michael Smith
RB		Robert Smith
RB		Shawn Sykes
RB		Nathan Wonsley	Sr
QB		Mark Young

Defense

Pos.	#	Name	Class
LB		Daniel Boyce
DL		Lester Brinkley
DL		Mike Fitzsimmons
DB		Everett Flakes
LB		Jeff Herrod
LB		Fuzzy Huddleston
DL		Lopaz Jones
LB		Reed Killion
DB		Stevon Moore
DB		Jeff Noblin
DB		Frank Porter
DL		Michael Portis
DL		Benton Reed
DB		Jonathan Shelley
DB		Eric Truitt
DL		Wesley Walls
DL		Jay Webb

Special teams

Pos.	#	Name	Class
K		Bryan Owen
P		Bill Smith

Head coach

- Billy Brewer

Coordinators/assistant coaches

Legend

- (C) Team captain
- (S) Suspended
- (I) Ineligible
- Injured
- Redshirt

Roster
Last update: 2026-May-25

== Season summary ==
=== Arkansas ===
External videos
- 1985 Arkansas at Ole Miss – Full game broadcast

=== at Auburn ===
External videos
- 1985 Ole Miss at Auburn – Full game broadcast

=== LSU ===
External videos
- 1985 LSU at Ole Miss – Full game broadcast

=== at Tennessee ===
External videos
- 1985 Ole Miss at Tennessee – Full game broadcast

=== vs Mississippi St ===
Mississippi State Bulldogs (5–5) vs. Ole Miss Rebels (3–6–1)

Quarter	1	2	3	4	Total
Ole Miss	7	10	21	7	45
Mississippi St	7	0	0	20	27

at Mississippi Veterans Memorial Stadium, Jackson, Mississippi

- Date: November 23, 1985
- Game attendance: 48,705
- Box Score

Game information

First quarter

- MSU – Don Smith 1-yard run (Artie Cosby kick), 7:29. Mississippi St 7–0.
- OM – J.R. Ambrose 38-yard pass from Mark Young (Bryan Owen kick), 1:06. Tie 7–7.

Second quarter

- OM – Jamie Holder 13-yard pass from Mark Young (Bryan Owen kick), 13:56. Ole Miss 14–7.
- OM – Bryan Owen 41-yard field goal, 8:59. Ole Miss 17–7.

Third quarter

- OM – Nathan Wonsley 2-yard run (Bryan Owen kick), 10:28. Ole Miss 24–7.
- OM – Nathan Wonsley 6-yard run (Bryan Owen kick), 6:43. Ole Miss 31–7.
- OM – Willie Goodloe 4-yard run (Bryan Owen kick), 2:33. Ole Miss 38–7.

Fourth quarter

- MSU – Don Smith 1-yard run (run failed), 6:36. Ole Miss 38–13.
- MSU – Don Smith 1-yard run (Don Smith run), 3:51. Ole Miss 38–21.
- OM – Shawn Sykes 3-yard run (Bryan Owen kick), 1:16. Ole Miss 45–21.
- MSU – Louis Clark 35-yard pass from Don Smith (pass failed), 0:47. Ole Miss 45–27.

Top passers

- OM – Mark Young – 10/19, 173 yards, 2 TD
- MSU – Don Smith – 13/28, 188 yards, TD

Top rushers

- OM – Shawn Sykes – 12 rushes, 72 yards, TD
- MSU – Hank Phillips – 11 rushes, 33 yards

Top receivers

- OM – J.R. Ambrose – 4 receptions, 82 yards, TD
- MSU – Louis Clark – 4 receptions, 81 yards, TD

- Third straight win vs. MSU
- Most points scored by Ole Miss since 1982 vs. Tulane
- Defense - seven sacks

External videos
- Billy Brewer Show – 1985 vs. Mississippi St
