= 1986 Cotton Bowl Classic =

- 50th Cotton Bowl Classic
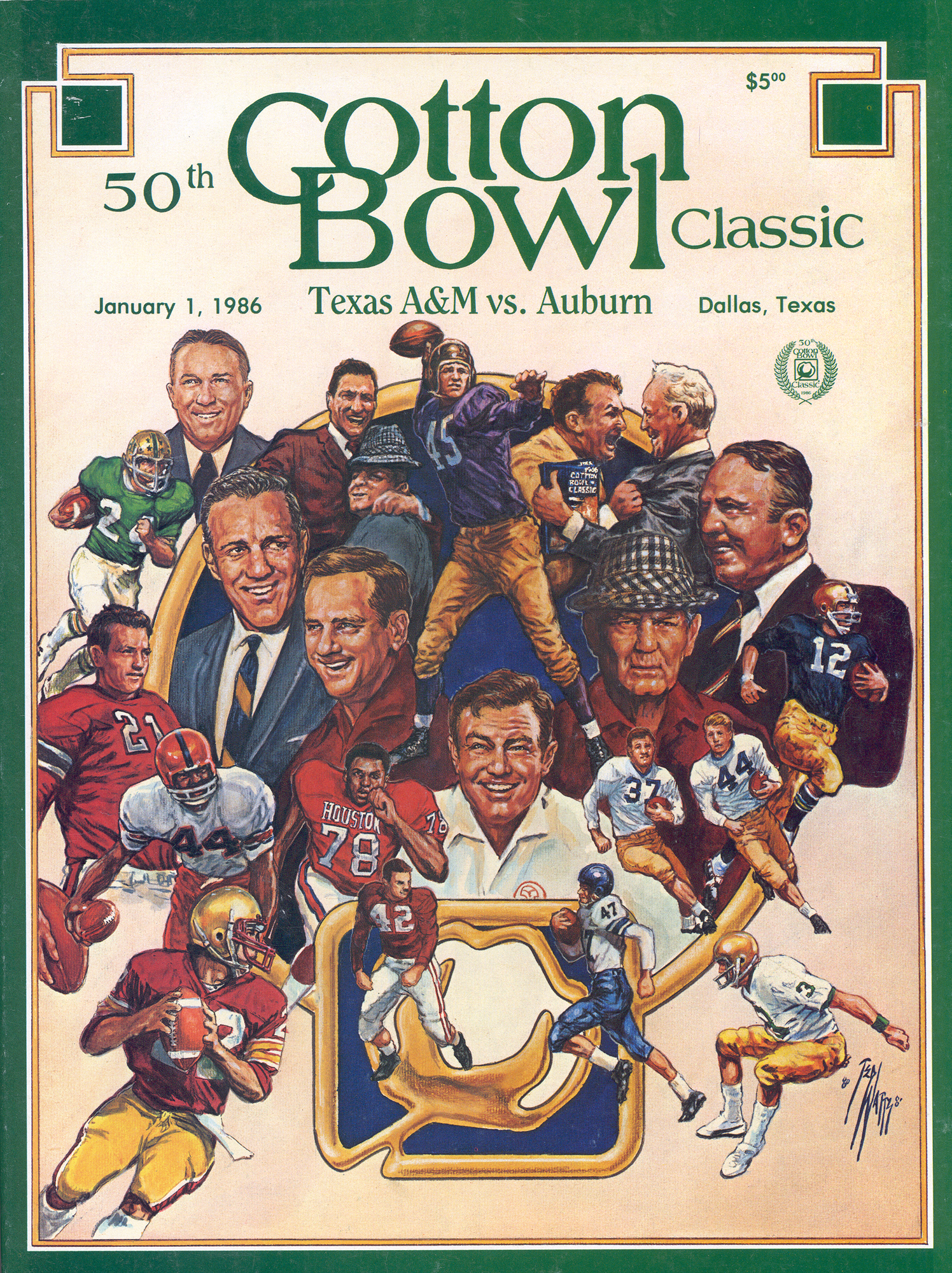
Auburn Tigers	Texas A&M Aggies
(8–3)	(9–2)
SEC	SWC
16	36
Head coach: Pat Dye	Head coach: Jackie Sherrill
AP / Coaches; 16 / 15	AP / Coaches; 11 / 11
	1	2	3	4	Total
Auburn	7	6	3	0	16
Texas A&M	12	3	6	15	36
- Date: January 1, 1986
- Season: 1985
- Stadium: Cotton Bowl
- Location: Dallas, Texas
- MVP: Domingo Bryant (A&M SS); Bo Jackson (Auburn RB)
- Favorite: Auburn by 2 points
- Referee: Sam Maphis (Big Eight)
- Attendance: 73,137

United States TV coverage
- Network: CBS
- Announcers: Brent Musburger, Ara Parseghian

The Cotton Bowl in Dallas, Texas, hosted the Cotton Bowl Classic.

The 1986 Cotton Bowl Classic was the 50th edition of the college football bowl game, played at the Cotton Bowl in Dallas, Texas, on Wednesday, January 1. Part of the 1985–86 bowl game season, it matched the sixteenth-ranked Auburn Tigers of the Southeastern Conference (SEC) and the Texas A&M Aggies of the Southwest Conference (SWC). A slight underdog, Texas A&M won by twenty points, 36–16.

== Teams ==
=== Auburn ===
Auburn was highlighted by running back Bo Jackson, who rushed for 1,786 yards and won the Heisman Trophy for a team that at one point was ranked #1 before losing to Tennessee September 28. The Tigers finished 8–3, but their 3-3 conference record was only good enough for sixth in the SEC, finishing behind the three teams that had beaten them (Tennessee, Florida, and Alabama).

=== Texas A&M ===
Jackie Sherrill was in his fourth year as head coach of the Aggies: in his previous three years, A&M finished 16–16–1. They won the Southwest Conference championship for the first time since 1976; their previous appearance in the Cotton Bowl was eighteen years earlier in 1968.

== Game summary ==
Televised by CBS, the game kicked off shortly after 12:30 p.m. CST, as did the Fiesta Bowl on NBC.

Bo Jackson started the scoring for Auburn with a touchdown run early in the game after a fumble recovery. But A&M responded with their own touchdown run by Harry Johnson, and they scored just three minutes later, but it was only 12–6 A&M, due to a missed extra point and a failed conversion attempt. Jackson stuck back for Auburn by catching a 73-yard touchdown pass from Pat Washington to give Auburn the lead again, though they missed the conversion attempt. Scott Slater kicked a 26-yard field goal to give A&M the lead again at halftime, 15–13.

Anthony Toney increased A&M's lead with a two-yard touchdown run early in the third quarter, but another failed conversion attempt meant it was still a one possession lead at 21–13. Auburn mustered a field goal by Chris Johnson to make it 21–16 entering the fourth quarter. Auburn drove to the A&M six-yard line as the fourth quarter began, but they were stuffed four times. Auburn was given another chance when A&M punted, but Jackson was stuffed again at A&M's 27. From that point on, A&M took control. With 2:22 to go, Keith Woodside caught a touchdown pass, as they also succeeded in gaining the two-point conversion. After an interception seconds later, Anthony Toney added on with his second rushing touchdown of the day to make it 36–16 as time expired.

=== Scoring ===
First quarter

- Auburn – Bo Jackson 5-yard run (Chris Johnson kick)
- Texas A&M – Harry Johnson 11-yard run (Eric Franklin kick failed)
- Texas A&M – Keith Woodside 22-yard run (pass failed)

Second quarter

- Auburn – Jackson 73-yard pass from Pat Washington (run failed)
- Texas A&M – Scott Slater 26-yard field goal

Third quarter

- Texas A&M – Anthony Toney 21-yard run (pass failed)
- Auburn – Johnson 26-yard field goal

Fourth quarter

- Texas A&M – Woodside 9-yard pass from Kevin Murray (Rod Bernstine run)
- Texas A&M – Toney 1-yard run (Slater kick)

== Outstanding players of the game ==
- Auburn: Bo Jackson who had rushed for 129 yards on 31 carries along with 2 catches for 73 yards.
- Texas A&M: Domingo Bryant, who intercepted two passes*

== Statistics ==
Statistics	Auburn	Texas A&M
First downs	16	21
Yards rushing	54–198	48–186
Yards passing	154	292
Passing (C–A–I)	7–17–2	16–26–1
Total offense	71–352	74–478
Return yards	48	51
Punts-Average	5-43.8	5–45.0
Fumbles-Lost	2–1	1–1
Turnovers	3	2
Penalties-Yards	1–5	5–45
Time of possession	30:46	29:14

== Aftermath ==
Texas A&M played in the next two Cotton Bowls (1987, 1988), winning the latter. Auburn went on to five more consecutive bowl games under Dye before he resigned after the 1992 season. They returned to the Cotton Bowl 21 years later, and defeated Nebraska, 17–14.
