= Sean Salisbury =

American football player (born 1963)

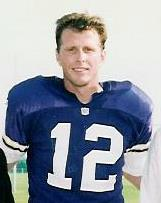
- Salisbury in 1993

No. 8, 12
- Position: Quarterback

Personal information
- Born: March 9, 1963 (age 63); Long Beach, California, U.S.
- Listed height: 6 ft 5 in (1.96 m)
- Listed weight: 217 lb (98 kg)

Career information
- High school: Orange Glen (Escondido, California)
- College: USC (1981–1985)
- NFL draft: 1986: undrafted

Career history
- Seattle Seahawks (1986); Indianapolis Colts (1987); Winnipeg Blue Bombers (1988–1989); Minnesota Vikings (1990–1993); Houston Oilers (1994)*; Minnesota Vikings (1994); San Diego Chargers (1996)
- * Offseason or practice squad member only

Awards and highlights
- Grey Cup champion (1988)

Career NFL statistics
- Passing attempts: 577
- Passing completions: 318
- Completion percentage: 55.1%
- TD–INT: 19–19
- Passing yards: 3,824
- Passer rating: 72.9
- Stats at Pro Football Reference

Richard Sean Salisbury (born March 9, 1963) is an American football analyst and former player who was the host of The Sean Salisbury Show on KBME, Sportstalk 790, an iHeartRadio station in Houston, Texas. Salisbury was let go by the network in October 2025. He played professionally as a quarterback in the National Football League (NFL) and Canadian Football League (CFL). He played college football for the USC Trojans.

== Early life ==
Salisbury was born on March 9, 1963, in Long Beach, California. He attended Orange Glen High School in Escondido, California. During his senior year at Orange Glen, he was a highly recruited quarterback, choosing USC over UCLA, BYU, Stanford, Notre Dame, Cal, Arizona, Arizona State. Sean's brother is Brett Salisbury.

Salisbury was a high school All-American basketball player, averaging 26.5 points per game his senior year. UCLA and USC both offered Salisbury basketball scholarships.

Salisbury, who is divorced, has three children, Dylan, Dodge, and Shea.

== College career ==
Salisbury became USC's starting quarterback midway through the 1982 season, which they ended with a record of 8–3; NCAA sanctions prevented them from playing in a bowl game. In 1983 the Trojans, still under sanctions, fell to a record of 4–6–1, their first losing season in 22 years. Salisbury suffered a season-ending injury early in the 1984 season, but was on the team as USC won the Rose Bowl over Ohio State. In his 1985 senior year, Salisbury was the main quarterback through a 6–5 campaign, but lost the starting job to Rodney Peete before they fell to Alabama in the Aloha Bowl. Salisbury finished his USC career as the school's all-time leader in pass completions (346) and yards gained (4,481), breaking marks previously held by Paul McDonald; both records were later broken by Peete. Salisbury was also second in pass attempts (602) and fourth in touchdowns (25). He also ranked fourth in USC history in total offense (4,127 yards), trailing Charles White, Marcus Allen and Jimmy Jones.

== Professional career ==
During his ten-year career, Salisbury was a member of the Seattle Seahawks, Indianapolis Colts, Minnesota Vikings, Houston Oilers, and San Diego Chargers, as well as the Winnipeg Blue Bombers of the Canadian Football League. In 1988, Salisbury and the Winnipeg Blue Bombers won the 76th Grey Cup championship over Matt Dunigan and the BC Lions.

== Broadcaster ==
After getting his start on the Comedy Central show BattleBots, Salisbury went on to become an NFL analyst on ESPN, appearing on SportsCenter and NFL Live.

In 2004, Salisbury was offered a job with the Arizona Cardinals by his former coach and co-worker at ESPN, Dennis Green, to become their new quarterbacks coach. Salisbury pondered for weeks, but eventually declined and stayed on with ESPN.

Salisbury was hired as a consultant for the 2005 remake of The Longest Yard. On the set, Salisbury taught Adam Sandler proper quarterback mechanics, cadences, and footwork. Sandler later offered Salisbury a role in the 2006 film he produced, The Benchwarmers.

On May 9, 2006, Salisbury began broadcasting on ESPN Radio 1000, Chicago with Steve Rosenbloom. He also did guest spots on the ESPN Classic comedy program Cheap Seats, where he provided his signature breakdowns of the action in a more comedic manner. He has covered for Mike Golic on Mike and Mike in the Morning.

In 2007, Salisbury's No. 12 football jersey was retired at his alma mater, Orange Glen High School, an honor no other person in school history has ever received. "I can't believe I'm having my number retired like John Elway, Marcus Allen, Larry Bird or Magic Johnson," Salisbury said. "In my own little world, I will always cherish being the first at my high school to be honored like this."

After ESPN, Salisbury worked briefly for OPENSports.com and KRLD-FM 105.3 The Fan, the CBS Radio affiliate in Dallas. On September 25, 2009, Salisbury provided the color commentary for the Lingerie Football League (LFL) presentation of Friday Night Football.

In 2008, Salisbury left ESPN. In 2010, he admitted to USA Today that while he had been at ESPN, he had been suspended for showing a picture of his penis to at least one coworker. He previously had denied that he had done so, but he later admitted that he had done so. "I was ashamed, and I didn’t want to say anything,” Salisbury told USA Today. “I thought it would go away and let my ego get in the way. Since then, I’ve beat myself up about it more than 10 baseball bats could. A stupid mistake can cost you, and this has really cost me. I should have been having this conversation a long time ago."

On October 20, 2010, it was announced Salisbury would host a pilot for a sports comedy talk show called Inside Sports: News You Can Almost Trust. The show aired on Versus in January. Producer Mark McClure called the show "ESPN meets Comedy Central's Daily Show with some SNL skits, too. Sean will be our Jon Stewart." After the pilot aired the show was retooled as a more serious Inside Sports Unleashed, which began taping on May 12, 2011.

On September 9, 2013, Salisbury became part of the Yahoo! Sports Radio network lineup as co-host of "The War Room" with John Granato airing from 3:00 pm to 7:00 pm ET daily. The program remained when Yahoo! Sports Radio was renamed SB Nation Radio in 2016.

He became the host of The Sean Salisbury Show on beIN Sports on April 17, 2017.

In June 2018, he left BeIn Sports and SB Nation Radio to become the afternoon-drive host at Houston radio station KBME Sportstalk 790. On March 25, 2019, KBME moved him to morning drive, replacing Josh Innes.
