= 1986 USFL season =

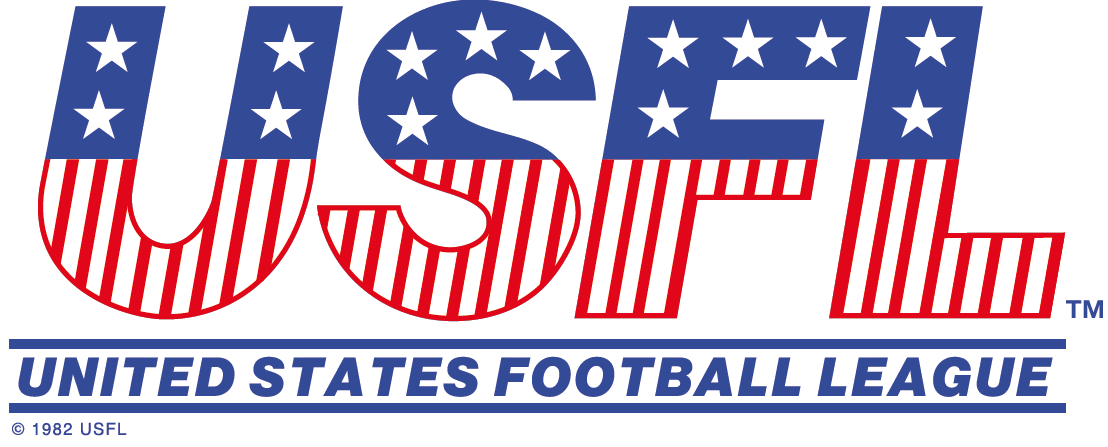
- Duration: September 13, 1986 – January 11, 1987
- Date: February 1, 1987
- Finals venue: Gator Bowl, Jacksonville, Florida

Seasons
- ← 1985

USFL teams: Independence, Liberty

The 1986 USFL season would have been the fourth season of the United States Football League. Plans and a schedule had been set for a 1986 season, which (unlike the previous three seasons, which were played in spring) would have played in the autumn and winter months, but the failure to secure a large judgment or concessions through a landmark antitrust lawsuit against the National Football League, combined with the seizure of one of the team's assets, days before the season was to begin led the league to postpone, then ultimately cancel the season and cease operations. The federal court judgement found the NFL guilty of violating antitrust guidelines on July 29, 1986, but the USFL was only awarded $1 (eventually raised to $3.76 through automatic trebling and compound interest, though the league never claimed the money) in damages plus court costs, as the jury found that the actions of the USFL owners had done as much in detriment to themselves as did the actions of the NFL. On August 4, the 1986 season was canceled. On August 7, all players were released from their contracts.

== Franchise changes ==
- Six of the seven teams in the Western Conference dropped out of play after the 1985 season, leaving only the Arizona Outlaws. In contrast, all seven teams from the Eastern Conference were slated to return intact.
  - The San Antonio Gunslingers folded after its owner, Clinton Manges, abandoned the team partway through the previous season.
  - The Oakland Invaders, Portland Breakers and league-owned Los Angeles Express all pulled out of competition, citing financial problems.
  - The Denver Gold, one of two teams to vote against moving to a fall schedule, sold its football assets to the Jacksonville Bulls, after initially announcing its intent to move to Portland to take the place of the Breakers.
  - The Houston Gamblers assets were sold to the New Jersey Generals in a complicated series of transactions that had the Gamblers sold to Stephen M. Ross, merging the Gamblers with the Generals (with the Gamblers' previous owner retained as team president), and Generals owner Donald Trump buying out Ross's stake after Ross raised concerns about the Generals' debt load.
- Stephen Ross then bought the Baltimore Stars, who were to move to Memorial Stadium in Baltimore, after playing the previous season at the University of Maryland's Byrd Stadium in College Park due to conflicts with baseball.
- A franchise representing Chicago, to be owned by Eddie Einhorn and a replacement for the widely unpopular Chicago Blitz, was originally to begin play in the fall 1986 season; for reasons unknown, Chicago was left off the 1986 schedule. As the Chicago team would not have had access to Soldier Field and because Einhorn was a part-owner of the Chicago White Sox, the team would have likely had to move to Comiskey Park, a stadium that had not hosted football since 1958.
- No expansion teams were slated to be added.

A major point of uncertainty was the case of the Tampa Bay Bandits. The Bandits were in ownership turmoil as the result of co-owner Stephen Arky's 1985 suicide and the terminal illness of majority owner John F. Bassett, who died in May 1986; even if Bassett had been well enough to continue in the league, he was an outspoken opponent of sharing a market with the NFL's Buccaneers in the fall and had planned to pull the Bandits out of the league to start a spring circuit of his own, which at one point—possibly due to delirium brought on by brain cancer—Bassett had proposed as a multiple-sport league. Bassett had begun merger discussions with the Jacksonville Bulls and Orlando Renegades (Renegades owner Donald Dizney had previously been a minority owner of the Bandits) to create a statewide Florida franchise, but Dizney rejected the proposal out of loyalty to Orlando and Bulls owner Fred Bullard was only interested if Bassett, Arky and Burt Reynolds had stayed on as investors in the merged team. Eventually, the league found an ownership group willing to take Bassett's place: Lee Scarfone and Tony Cunningham agreed to field the Tampa Bay Bandits in the USFL for the fall 1986 season. However, it soon became known that Scarfone and Cunningham had gone into significant debt to buy out Bassett's rights and were left bankrupt when, on August 4, 1986, a judge ordered the seizure of all of the team's assets to cover the contract of Bret Clark, a safety Bassett had signed in early 1985.

Arky's suicide also threatened the Birmingham Stallions' existence. Arky's father-in-law Marvin Warner had owned the Stallions, and the sequence of events that led to Arky's suicide, the exposure of securities fraud at Arky's company ESM Government Securities, sparked a bank run on Home State Savings Bank when it was revealed that most of ESM's money had been deposited in that bank, wiping out most of Warner's net worth. The team's limited partners, along with a bailout from the city of Birmingham, kept the team afloat during 1985.

The loss of the Western Conference required a realignment of the league's (ostensibly) eight remaining teams. The three Florida teams would have joined Arizona as the "Independence Division", while the "Liberty Division" would comprise the four other teams.

- Independence Division
  - Arizona Outlaws
  - Jacksonville Bulls
  - Orlando Renegades
  - Tampa Bay Bandits
- Liberty Division
  - Baltimore Stars
  - Birmingham Stallions
  - Memphis Showboats
  - New Jersey Generals

== Head coach changes ==
Three teams would have entered the 1986 season with new head coaches.

- Baltimore's former coach Jim Mora had taken over the NFL's New Orleans Saints. Baltimore had not named a head coach at the time the season was suspended; however, Ted Marchibroda was rumored to be the leading candidate for the open position.
- Mouse Davis, who coached Denver in 1984, was set to take over the Jacksonville Bulls as part of the merger between the teams. The Bulls' previous coach, Lindy Infante, left to join the NFL's Cleveland Browns as offensive coordinator.
- Jack Pardee, who coached Houston in 1985, was set to take over the New Jersey Generals as part of the merger between the teams. New Jersey's previous coach, Walt Michaels, never coached football in the United States again.

The sudden cancellation of the 1986 season left the league's coaches out of work. While players were able to sign with other teams fairly quickly, other leagues' teams had already set their coaching staffs, meaning that Pardee, Orlando's Lee Corso and Tampa Bay's Steve Spurrier would have to wait until 1987 to find work. For Birmingham's Rollie Dotsch, it would be too late: by the time he returned to coaching as an NFL assistant in 1987, he had developed terminal cancer. Davis would find work as a consultant with the startup Arena Football League in 1986 and 1987, then jumped to the World Indoor Football League in 1988 before that league also folded before beginning play, after which joined the NFL as an assistant later that fall. Michaels, Memphis's Pepper Rodgers and Arizona's Frank Kush effectively ended their careers after the USFL ceased operations (Kush's personal services contract meant he would never have to work again; Rodgers would briefly return to coaching in 1995, while Michaels claimed he was blacklisted by the NFL in his efforts to find paying work afterward). Corso would move to broadcasting, beginning a long career working for ESPN as a college football analyst.

Marv Levy, whose rights were still under contract to the suspended Chicago team, would find work during the 1986 season: after the Buffalo Bills fired Hank Bullough (who himself had been under contract to the Pittsburgh Maulers), the team hired Levy midseason. Levy would remain with the Bills for the next 12 seasons.

== Draft ==
The 1986 USFL draft was held May 6, 1986; as in 1983 and 1985, the Grand Hyatt Hotel in New York City hosted the draft. The Orlando Renegades selected Mike Haight, an offensive tackle from the Iowa Hawkeyes football team, as the first overall pick; Haight would instead sign with the NFL's New York Jets before the USFL season was postponed. The 1986 draft was complicated by the fact that a number of teams had traded draft picks to and from teams that had folded; under the draft rules for 1986, all teams, defunct or not, were included, and any draft pick that was held by a defunct team (either by trade or original award) was skipped over. (For example, the Bandits traded away their first round draft pick to the Denver Gold; as the Gold had pulled out of the league by 1986, and they held that pick, it was skipped over, even though the Bandits still existed.)

The 1986 USFL territorial draft was held April 23, 1986. No dispersal draft was conducted.

== Season structure ==
The USFL planned to play its games on Saturdays and Sunday nights, with a weekly Thursday night game beginning in Week 3. The season was to last eighteen weeks, beginning Saturday, September 13, with no bye weeks. A single Tuesday night game was scheduled for October 28, with New Jersey playing at Jacksonville. The league scheduled a game for Thanksgiving Day and also planned a full slate of four games on Christmas, imposing on a holiday the NFL had almost completely avoided (with the exception of two playoff games in 1971) up to that point. The league avoided competing with the bowl games of college football by scheduling its games for the first week of January for Friday through Sunday, January 2–4. The season would end January 11.

Five teams would have made the playoffs, with a single play-in game to be held the weekend of January 17–18, two semifinals on January 25 and 26, and the league championship on February 1; the fourth USFL Championship Game was to be hosted at the Gator Bowl Stadium in Jacksonville, Florida.

== Broadcasting ==
The USFL secured a television contract extension with ESPN to carry a game of the week during the regular season and the entirety of the playoffs.

The league had no over-the-air national broadcast partner for the 1986 season, a condition the league blamed on NFL coercion. One of the USFL's major points of contention in its antitrust lawsuit was that the NFL had allegedly conspired with the Big Three television networks to place the NFL on all three networks, preventing any competitor from gaining a contract. The jury rejected this claim. (The league, despite lack of support from the Big Three, nevertheless would have had options. The Fox network, which would eventually rise to become the fourth major network after buying NFL rights in the 1990s, was launching just as the USFL had planned to move to fall. For reasons unknown—possibilities include Fox's status as a network still in its infancy and the network's desire to limit the amount of programming it carried to avoid regulations—neither the USFL nor Fox pursued a partnership with each other until 36 years later, when Fox claimed the abandoned USFL trademarks for its own USFL that launched in 2022. Einhorn also had access to his own TVS Television Network, an experienced sports syndicator; the USFL could have also relied on its local broadcast partners, many of which were independent stations not beholden to the NFL or Big Three, and regional sports networks to continue coverage had they chosen to do so.) Another factor in the league's inability to secure a broadcast contract in the autumn was the court-ordered decentralization of college football telecasts; with more college football telecasts available in the mid-1980s, the USFL was facing an increasingly crowded market for televised football (part of the reason why, though ESPN and ABC were by this point owned by the same company and ABC had carried games the previous three years, ABC declined to carry games in 1986; USFL games had faced declining ratings and ABC also held contracts with all of the major college football conferences).

By 1987, the NFL and ESPN had reached an agreement to expand into the time slot that the USFL had planned to use, when ESPN Sunday Night Football debuted.

== See also ==
- 1986 NFL season
