= 1985 Mississippi State Bulldogs football team =

American college football season

1985 Mississippi State Bulldogs football
- Conference: Southeastern Conference
- Record: 5–6 (0–6 SEC)
- Head coach: Emory Bellard (7th season)
- Defensive coordinator: Melvin Robertson (7th season)
- Home stadium: Scott Field

1985 Southeastern Conference football standings
	Conf.					Overall
Team	W		L		T	W		L		T
No. 4 Tennessee $	5	–	1	–	0	9	–	1	–	2
No. 5 Florida	5	–	1	–	0	9	–	1	–	1
No. 13 Alabama	4	–	1	–	1	9	–	2	–	1
No. 20 LSU	4	–	1	–	1	9	–	2	–	1
Georgia	3	–	2	–	1	7	–	3	–	2
Auburn	3	–	3	–	0	8	–	4	–	0
Ole Miss	2	–	4	–	0	4	–	6	–	1
Vanderbilt	1	–	4	–	1	3	–	7	–	1
Kentucky	1	–	5	–	0	5	–	6	–	0
Mississippi State	0	–	6	–	0	5	–	6	–	0
$ – Conference champion; Florida ineligible for SEC championship due to NCAA probation.; Rankings from AP Poll

The 1985 Mississippi State Bulldogs football team represented Mississippi State University as a member of the Southeastern Conference (SEC) during the 1985 NCAA Division I-A football season. Led by seventh-year head coach Emory Bellard, the Bulldogs compiled an overall record of 5–6, with a mark of 0–6 in conference play, and finished in tenth place in the SEC. Head coach Emory Bellard was fired after the season, the Bulldogs' fourth consecutive losing season.

== Schedule ==
Date	Opponent	Site	TV	Result	Attendance	Source
September 7	Arkansas State*	Scott Field; Starkville, MS		W 22–14	28,122	
September 14	Syracuse*	Scott Field; Starkville, MS		W 30–3	26,832	
September 21	vs. Southern Miss*	Mississippi Veterans Memorial Stadium; Jackson, MS		W 23–20	54,300	
September 28	No. 11 Florida	Scott Field; Starkville, MS		L 22–36	34,588	
October 5	Memphis State*	Scott Field; Starkville, MS		W 31–28	26,012	
October 12	at Kentucky	Commonwealth Stadium; Lexington, KY		L 19–33	58,345	
October 19	Tulane*	Scott Field; Starkville, MS		W 31–27	30,420	
October 26	at No. 6 Auburn	Jordan-Hare Stadium; Auburn, AL		L 9–21	68,700	
November 2	at Alabama	Bryant–Denny Stadium; Tuscaloosa, AL (rivalry)		L 28–44	60,210	
November 16	at No. 19 LSU	Tiger Stadium; Baton Rouge, LA (rivalry)	TigerVision	L 15–17	76,099	
November 23	vs. Ole Miss	Mississippi Veterans Memorial Stadium; Jackson, MS (Egg Bowl)		L 27–45	48,705	
*Non-conference game; Rankings from AP Poll released prior to the game

== Roster ==
1985 Mississippi State Bulldogs football team roster
Players
Coaches
Offense

Pos.	#	Name	Class
TE		Louis Clark
QB	15	Don Smith	Jr

Defense

Pos.	#	Name	Class

Special teams

Pos.	#	Name	Class
K		Artie Cosby

Head coach

- Emory Bellard

Coordinators/assistant coaches

Legend

- (C) Team captain
- (S) Suspended
- (I) Ineligible
- Injured
- Redshirt

== Season summary ==
=== vs Ole Miss ===
Mississippi State Bulldogs (5–5) vs. Ole Miss Rebels (3–6–1)

Quarter	1	2	3	4	Total
Ole Miss	7	10	21	7	45
Mississippi St	7	0	0	20	27

at Mississippi Veterans Memorial Stadium, Jackson, Mississippi

- Date: November 23, 1985
- Game attendance: 48,705
- Box Score

Game information

First quarter

- MSU – Don Smith 1-yard run (Artie Cosby kick), 7:29. Mississippi St 7–0.
- OM – J.R. Ambrose 38-yard pass from Mark Young (Bryan Owen kick), 1:06. Tie 7–7.

Second quarter

- OM – Jamie Holder 13-yard pass from Mark Young (Bryan Owen kick), 13:56. Ole Miss 14–7.
- OM – Bryan Owen 41-yard field goal, 8:59. Ole Miss 17–7.

Third quarter

- OM – Nathan Wonsley 2-yard run (Bryan Owen kick), 10:28. Ole Miss 24–7.
- OM – Nathan Wonsley 6-yard run (Bryan Owen kick), 6:43. Ole Miss 31–7.
- OM – Willie Goodloe 4-yard run (Bryan Owen kick), 2:33. Ole Miss 38–7.

Fourth quarter

- MSU – Don Smith 1-yard run (run failed), 6:36. Ole Miss 38–13.
- MSU – Don Smith 1-yard run (Don Smith run), 3:51. Ole Miss 38–21.
- OM – Shawn Sykes 3-yard run (Bryan Owen kick), 1:16. Ole Miss 45–21.
- MSU – Louis Clark 35-yard pass from Don Smith (pass failed), 0:47. Ole Miss 45–27.

Top passers

- OM – Mark Young – 10/19, 173 yards, 2 TD
- MSU – Don Smith – 13/28, 188 yards, TD

Top rushers

- OM – Shawn Sykes – 12 rushes, 72 yards, TD
- MSU – Hank Phillips – 11 rushes, 33 yards

Top receivers

- OM – J.R. Ambrose – 4 receptions, 82 yards, TD
- MSU – Louis Clark – 4 receptions, 81 yards, TD

- Emory Bellard's last game as MSU head coach

External videos
- Emory Bellard Show – 1985 vs Ole Miss
