= 1985 Georgia Bulldogs football team =

American college football season

1985 Georgia Bulldogs football

Sun Bowl, T 13–13 vs. Arizona
- Conference: Southeastern Conference
- Record: 7–3–2 (3–2–1 SEC)
- Head coach: Vince Dooley (22nd season)
- Offensive coordinator: George Haffner (6th season)
- Defensive coordinator: Bill Lewis (5th season)
- Home stadium: Sanford Stadium

1985 Southeastern Conference football standings
	Conf.					Overall
Team	W		L		T	W		L		T
No. 4 Tennessee $	5	–	1	–	0	9	–	1	–	2
No. 5 Florida	5	–	1	–	0	9	–	1	–	1
No. 13 Alabama	4	–	1	–	1	9	–	2	–	1
No. 20 LSU	4	–	1	–	1	9	–	2	–	1
Georgia	3	–	2	–	1	7	–	3	–	2
Auburn	3	–	3	–	0	8	–	4	–	0
Ole Miss	2	–	4	–	0	4	–	6	–	1
Vanderbilt	1	–	4	–	1	3	–	7	–	1
Kentucky	1	–	5	–	0	5	–	6	–	0
Mississippi State	0	–	6	–	0	5	–	6	–	0
$ – Conference champion; Florida ineligible for SEC championship due to NCAA probation.; Rankings from AP Poll

The 1985 Georgia Bulldogs football team represented the University of Georgia as a member of the Southeastern Conference (SEC) during the 1985 NCAA Division I-A football season. Led by 22nd-year head coach Vince Dooley, the Bulldogs compiled an overall record of 7–3–2, with a mark of 3–2–1 in conference play, and finished fifth in the SEC.

== Schedule ==
Date	Opponent	Rank	Site	TV	Result	Attendance	Source
September 2	Alabama		Sanford Stadium; Athens, GA (rivalry)	ABC	L 16–20	81,277	
September 14	Baylor*		Sanford Stadium; Athens, GA	TBS	W 17–14	77,190	
September 21	at Clemson*		Memorial Stadium; Clemson, SC (rivalry)	CBS	W 20–13	80,473	
September 28	South Carolina*		Sanford Stadium; Athens, GA (rivalry)		W 35–21	82,122	
October 12	at Ole Miss	No. 18	Mississippi Veterans Memorial Stadium; Jackson, MS		W 49–21	35,000	
October 19	at Vanderbilt	No. 16	Vanderbilt Stadium; Nashville, TN (rivalry)		T 13–13	41,137	
October 26	Kentucky		Sanford Stadium; Athens, GA	TBS	W 26–6	81,498	
November 2	Tulane*^{†}	No. 18	Sanford Stadium; Athens, GA		W 58–3	81,407	
November 9	vs. No. 1 Florida	No. 17	Gator Bowl Stadium; Jacksonville, FL (rivalry)		W 24–3	82,327	
November 16	No. 14 Auburn	No. 12	Sanford Stadium; Athens, GA (rivalry)	ABC	L 10–24	82,122	
November 30	at Georgia Tech*	No. 20	Grant Field; Atlanta, GA (rivalry)	TBS	L 16–20	59,206	
December 28	vs. Arizona*		Sun Bowl; El Paso, TX (Sun Bowl)	CBS	T 13–13	52,203	
*Non-conference game; ^{†}Homecoming; Rankings from AP Poll released prior to the game

== Roster ==
1985 Georgia Bulldogs football team roster
Players
Coaches
Offense

Pos.	#	Name	Class
QB	14	James Jackson	So
QB	15	Todd Williams (injured)	Sr
RB	32	Lars Tate	So
RB	43	David McCluskey	Jr
RB	38	Tim Worley	Fr

Defense

Pos.	#	Name	Class
DB	24	Gary Moss	Jr

Special teams

Pos.	#	Name	Class
P	6	Cris Carpenter

Head coach

- Vince Dooley

Coordinators/assistant coaches

Legend

- (C) Team captain
- (S) Suspended
- (I) Ineligible
- Injured
- Redshirt
