= 1985 All-SEC football team =

American college football all-star team

The 1985 All-SEC football team consists of American football players selected to the All-Southeastern Conference (SEC) chosen by various selectors for the 1985 NCAA Division I-A football season.

== Offensive selections ==
=== Receivers ===
- Tim McGee, Tennessee (Coaches-1)
- Albert Bell, Alabama (Coaches-1)

=== Tight ends ===
- Jim Popp, Vanderbilt (Coaches-1)

=== Tackles ===
- Will Wolford, Vanderbilt (Coaches-1)

=== Guards ===
- Bruce Wilkerson, Tennessee (Coaches-1)
- Steve Wallace, Auburn (Coaches-1)
- Jeff Zimmerman, Florida (Coaches-1)

=== Centers ===
- Peter Anderson, Georgia (Coaches-1)

=== Quarterbacks ===
- Mike Shula, Alabama (Coaches-1)

=== Running backs ===
- Bo Jackson, Auburn (College Football Hall of Fame) (Coaches-1)
- Dalton Hilliard, LSU (Coaches-1)

== Defensive selections ==
=== Ends ===
- Roland Barbay, LSU (Coaches-1)
- Greg Waters, Georgia (Coaches-1)

=== Tackles ===
- Jon Hand, Alabama (Coaches-1)
- Gerald Williams, Auburn (Coaches-1)
- Harold Hallman, Auburn (Coaches-1)

=== Linebackers ===
- Michael Brooks, LSU (Coaches-1)
- Alonzo Johnson, Florida (Coaches-1)
- Cornelius Bennett, Alabama (Coaches-1)
- Dale Jones, Tennessee (Coaches-1)

=== Backs ===
- Chris White, Tennessee (Coaches-1)
- John Little, Georgia (Coaches-1)
- Tom Powell, Auburn (Coaches-1)
- Norman Jefferson, LSU (Coaches-1)
- Freddie Robinson, Alabama (Coaches-1)

== Special teams ==
=== Kicker ===
- Carlos Reveiz, Tennessee (Coaches-1)

=== Punter ===
- Bill Smith, Ole Miss (Coaches-1)

== Key ==
AP = Associated Press

Coaches = selected by the SEC coaches

Bold = Consensus first-team selection by both AP and Coaches

== See also ==
- 1985 College Football All-America Team
