= 1986 All-SEC football team =

American college football all-star team

The 1986 All-SEC football team consists of American football players selected to the All-Southeastern Conference (SEC) chosen by various selectors for the 1986 NCAA Division I-A football season.

== Offensive selections ==
=== Receivers ===
- Ricky Nattiel, Florida (AP-1)
- Wendell Davis, LSU (AP-1)
- J. R. Ambrose, Ole Miss (AP-2)
- Albert Bell, Alabama (AP-2)

=== Tight ends ===
- Carl Parker, Vanderbilt (AP-1)
- Brian Kinchen, LSU (AP-2)

=== Tackles ===
- Stacy Searels, Auburn (AP-1)
- Wilbur Strozier, Georgia (AP-1)
- Bruce Wilkerson, Tennessee (AP-2)
- Jeff Zimmerman, Florida (AP-2)

=== Guards ===
- Eric Andolsek, LSU (AP-1)
- Bill Condon, Alabama (AP-1)
- Harry Galbreath, Tennessee (AP-2)
- John Hazard, LSU (AP-2)

=== Centers ===
- Ben Tamburello, Auburn (AP-1)
- Wes Neighbors, Alabama (AP-2)

=== Quarterbacks ===
- Tom Hodson, LSU (AP-1)
- Kerwin Bell, Florida (AP-2)

=== Running backs ===
- Brent Fullwood, Auburn (AP-1)
- Bobby Humphrey, Alabama (AP-1)
- Lars Tate, Georgia (AP-2)
- William Howard, Tennessee (AP-2)

== Defensive selections ==
=== Ends ===
- Karl Wilson, LSU (AP-1)
- Aundray Bruce, Auburn (AP-1)
- Roland Barbay, LSU (AP-2)
- Dale Jones, Tennessee (AP-2)

=== Tackles ===
- Keith Williams, Florida (AP-1)
- Tracy Rocker, Auburn (AP-1)
- Mike Fitzsimmons, Ole Miss (AP-2)
- Henry Harris, Georgia (AP-2)

=== Middle guards ===
- Henry Thomas, LSU (AP-1)
- Curt Jarvis, Alabama (AP-2)

=== Linebackers ===
- Cornelius Bennett, Alabama (AP-1)
- Clifford Charlton, Florida (AP-1)
- Kurt Crain, Auburn (AP-1)
- Toby Caston, LSU (AP-2)
- John Brantley, Georgia (AP-2)
- Jeff Herrod, Ole Miss (AP-2)

=== Backs ===
- Adrian White, Florida (AP-1)
- John Little, Georgia (AP-1)
- Freddie Robinson, Alabama (AP-1)
- Kevin Porter, Auburn (AP-2)
- Jarvis Williams, Florida (AP-2)
- Jeff Noblin, Ole Miss (AP-2)

== Special teams ==
=== Kicker ===
- Van Tiffin, Alabama (AP-1)
- Joe Worley, Kentucky (AP-2)

=== Punter ===
- Bill Smith, Ole Miss (AP-1)
- Cris Carpenter, Georgia (AP-2)

== Key ==
AP = Associated Press

Coaches = selected by the SEC coaches

Bold = Consensus first-team selection by both AP and Coaches

== See also ==
- 1986 College Football All-America Team
