= 1986 USFL draft =

American football league draft

General information
- Date: May 6, 1986
- Location: Grand Hyatt Hotel, New York

Overview
- 92 total selections in 12 rounds
- League: USFL
- First selection: Mike Haight, OT; Orlando Renegades

The 1986 USFL draft was the fourth and last collegiate draft of the United States Football League (USFL). It took place on May 6, 1986, at the Grand Hyatt Hotel in New York.

The Orlando Renegades used the first overall pick of the draft to select tackle Mike Haight.

== Player selections ==
= All-Star
= USFL MVP

Round	Pick #	USFL team	Player	Position	College
1	1	Orlando Renegades	Mike Haight	T	Iowa
1	2	Arizona Outlaws	Tony Casillas	NT	Oklahoma
1	3	Jacksonville Bulls	Robert Thompson	WR	Youngstown State
1	4	Memphis Showboats	Jim Everett	QB	Purdue
1	5	New Jersey Generals	James Pruitt	WR	Cal State Fullerton
1	6	Birmingham Stallions	Reggie Dupard	RB	SMU
1	7	Baltimore Stars	Erik Howard	DT	Washington State
1	8	Tampa Bay Bandits	Ernest Givins	WR	Louisville
2	9	Orlando Renegades	Patrick Franklin	RB	Southwest Texas State
2	10	Arizona Outlaws	Tim Ruiz	C	Utah State
2	11	New Jersey Generals	Mark Jackson	WR	Purdue
2	12	Birmingham Stallions	Lonnie May	RB	Southwest Oklahoma State
2	13	Baltimore Stars	John Taylor	WR	Delaware State
2	14	Memphis Showboats	Tony Baker	RB	East Carolina
3	15	Orlando Renegades	Gary Walker	C	Boston University
3	16	Jacksonville Bulls	Kyle Finney	WR	Delta State
3	17	Memphis Showboats	Mark Cochran	T	Baylor
3	18	New Jersey Generals	Dan McMillen	LB	Colorado
3	19	Birmingham Stallions	Richard Gwynn	RB	Utah State
3	20	Orlando Renegades	Lyle Pickens	DB	Colorado
3	21	Baltimore Stars	Napoleon McCallum	RB	Navy
4	22	Orlando Renegades	Curt Pardridge	WR	Northern Illinois
4	23	Arizona Outlaws	Steve O'Malley	DE	Northern Illinois
4	24	Jacksonville Bulls	Garrett Breeland	LB	USC
4	25	Tampa Bay Bandits	Joe Dudek	RB	Plymouth State
4	26	New Jersey Generals	Pat Miller	LB	Florida
4	27	Jacksonville Bulls	Danny Taylor	DB	UTEP
4	28	Birmingham Stallions	Ron Shegog	DB	Austin Peay
4	29	Baltimore Stars	Errol Tucker	DB	Utah
4	30	Arizona Outlaws	Steve Reese	G	Clemson
5	31	Orlando Renegades	Dave Wright	T	BYU
5	32	Jacksonville Bulls	Wesley Williams	WR	Angelo State
5	33	Tampa Bay Bandits	Don Pumphrey	T	Valdosta State
5	34	New Jersey Generals	Eugene Seale	LB	Lamar
5	35	Birmingham Stallions	Mark McCraney	LB	Alabama A&M
5	36	Tampa Bay Bandits	Jerry Butler	RB	East Tennessee State
6	37	Orlando Renegades	Chuck Sanders	RB	Slippery Rock
6	38	Birmingham Stallions	Tony Truelove	RB	Livingston
6	39	Arizona Outlaws	Larry Kolic	LB	Ohio State
6	40	New Jersey Generals	Ron Brown	WR	Colorado
6	41	Memphis Showboats	John Dumbauld	DE	Kentucky
6	42	Memphis Showboats	Gill Fenerty	RB	Holy Cross
6	43	Birmingham Stallions	Greg Williams	WR	Henderson State
6	44	Orlando Renegades	Bobby Howard	RB	Indiana
6	45	Baltimore Stars	Tim Cofield	DE	Elizabeth City State
7	46	Orlando Renegades	Dan Agen	C	Washington
7	47	Arizona Outlaws	Vai Sikahema	RB	BYU
7	48	Jacksonville Bulls	Filipo Mokofisi	LB	Utah
7	49	Tampa Bay Bandits	John Stuart	T	Texas
7	50	Birmingham Stallions	James Polk	DT	Grambling State
7	51	Memphis Showboats	Mike Perrino	T	Notre Dame
7	52	Birmingham Stallions	Pat Thetford	TE	Missouri
7	53	Baltimore Stars	Paul Miles	RB	Nebraska
8	54	Orlando Renegades	Tom Hamilton	T	West Virginia
8	55	New Jersey Generals	John Teltschik	P	Texas
8	56	Tampa Bay Bandits	Robert Duckswoth	DB	Southern Miss
8	57	Baltimore Stars	Ken Bell	RB	Boston College
8	58	Birmingham Stallions	Eric Drain	RB	Missouri
8	59	Baltimore Stars	James Luebbers	DT	Iowa State
8	60	Baltimore Stars	Junior Tautalatasi	RB	Washington State
9	61	Jacksonville Bulls	Eric Yarber	WR	Idaho
9	62	Arizona Outlaws	Chuck Banks	RB	West Virginia Tech
9	63	New Jersey Generals	Mark Drenth	T	Purdue
9	64	Tampa Bay Bandits	Kevin Walker	DB	East Carolina
9	65	Arizona Outlaws	Michael Cline	DE	Arkansas State
9	66	New Jersey Generals	Larry Shepherd	WR	Houston
9	67	Baltimore Stars	Lance Hamilton	LB	Penn State
10	68	Memphis Showboats	Don Sommer	G	UTEP
10	69	New Jersey Generals	James McKinney	DE	Texas
10	70	Jacksonville Bulls	Tracy Johnson	RB	Morningside
10	71	Tampa Bay Bandits	Wayne Dillard	LB	Alcorn State
10	72	New Jersey Generals	Henry Hill	WR	Southeastern Oklahoma State
10	73	Memphis Showboats	Glen Kozlowski	WR	BYU
10	74	Birmingham Stallions	Chris Hofer	DB	Northern Michigan
10	75	Baltimore Stars	Chuck Long	QB	Iowa
10	76	Tampa Bay Bandits	Bryan Chester	G	Texas
11	77	Tampa Bay Bandits	Thomas Gray	RB	West Virginia
11	78	Jacksonville Bulls	Rick Worman	QB	Eastern Washington
11	79	Tampa Bay Bandits	Chuck Herring	WR	Duke
11	80	New Jersey Generals	Walter Brister	QB	Northeast Louisiana
11	81	New Jersey Generals	Elliston Stinson	WR	Rice
11	82	Baltimore Stars	Gary Shippang	T	West Chester State
11	83	New Jersey Generals	Eugene Profit	DB	Yale
12	84	Birmingham Stallions	Bill Happel	WR	Iowa
12	85	Jacksonville Bulls	Ron Hadley	LB	Washington
12	86	Jacksonville Bulls	Ed Berry	DB	Utah State
12	87	New Jersey Generals	Mike Turner	DB	Northeast Louisiana
12	88	Baltimore Stars	Darren McCalister	DT	Prairie View A&M
12	89	Baltimore Stars	Kurt Beathard	QB	Towson State
12	90	Birmingham Stallions	Earl Conway	DE	Mississippi College
12	91	Orlando Renegades	Trell Hooper	DB	Memphis State
12	92	Baltimore Stars	Tony Woods	DB	Bloomsburg
