= The Sean Salisbury Show =

The Sean Salisbury Show is a television show hosted by Sean Salisbury. It airs on beIN Sports.
