= Freddie Robinson (American football) =

American football player (born 1964)

No. 47
- Position: Safety

Personal information
- Born: February 1, 1964 (age 62); Mobile, Alabama, U.S.
- Listed height: 6 ft 1 in (1.85 m)
- Listed weight: 191 lb (87 kg)

Career information
- High school: Davidson (Mobile, Alabama)
- College: Alabama
- NFL draft: 1987: 6th round, 142nd overall pick

Career history
- Indianapolis Colts (1987–1988)

Awards and highlights
- Third-team All-American (1986); 2× First-team All-SEC (1985, 1986)

Career NFL statistics
- Interceptions: 2
- Fumble recoveries: 1
- Stats at Pro Football Reference

Freddie O'Neal Robinson (born February 1, 1964) is an American former professional football player who was a defensive back for two seasons in the National Football League (NFL).

Robinson was born and raised in Mobile, Alabama and played scholastically at Davidson High School. He played college football for the Alabama Crimson Tide, where, as a senior, he was honored by Football News as a third-team All-American.

Robinson was selected by the Indianapolis Colts in the 6th round (142nd overall selection) of the 1987 NFL draft. He played two seasons for the Colts from 1987 to 1988, starting nine games as a rookie and ten the next year. He had two career interceptions, returning one 68 yards, but he did not score.
