= 1985 Auburn Tigers football team =

American college football season

1985 Auburn Tigers football

Cotton Bowl Classic, L 16–36 vs. Texas A&M
- Conference: Southeastern Conference
- Record: 8–4 (3–3 SEC)
- Head coach: Pat Dye (5th season)
- Offensive coordinator: Jack Crowe (4th season)
- Offensive scheme: I formation
- Defensive coordinator: Frank Orgel (5th season)
- Home stadium: Jordan-Hare Stadium

1985 Southeastern Conference football standings
	Conf.					Overall
Team	W		L		T	W		L		T
No. 4 Tennessee $	5	–	1	–	0	9	–	1	–	2
No. 5 Florida	5	–	1	–	0	9	–	1	–	1
No. 13 Alabama	4	–	1	–	1	9	–	2	–	1
No. 20 LSU	4	–	1	–	1	9	–	2	–	1
Georgia	3	–	2	–	1	7	–	3	–	2
Auburn	3	–	3	–	0	8	–	4	–	0
Ole Miss	2	–	4	–	0	4	–	6	–	1
Vanderbilt	1	–	4	–	1	3	–	7	–	1
Kentucky	1	–	5	–	0	5	–	6	–	0
Mississippi State	0	–	6	–	0	5	–	6	–	0
$ – Conference champion; Florida ineligible for SEC championship due to NCAA probation.; Rankings from AP Poll

The 1985 Auburn Tigers football team represented Auburn University as a member of the Southeastern Conference (SEC) during the 1985 NCAA Division I-A football season. Led by fifth-year head coach Pat Dye, the Tigers compiled an overall record of 8–4, with a mark of 3–3 in conference play, and finished sixth in the SEC.

Bo Jackson rushed for 1,786 yards, which was the second best single-season performance in SEC history behind Herschel Walker's 1,891 rushing yards for Georgia in 1981. For his performance, Jackson was awarded the Heisman Trophy edging out over Iowa quarterback Chuck Long. Auburn began the season ranked No. 1 in the AP Poll before losing to Tennessee on September 28.

== Schedule ==
Date	Opponent	Rank	Site	TV	Result	Attendance	Source
September 7	Southwestern Louisiana*	No. 2	Jordan-Hare Stadium; Auburn, AL		W 49–7	60,000	
September 14	Southern Miss*	No. 1	Jordan-Hare Stadium; Auburn, AL		W 29–18	63,000	
September 28	at Tennessee	No. 1	Neyland Stadium; Knoxville, TN (rivalry)	ABC	L 20–38	94,358	
October 5	Ole Miss	No. 14	Jordan-Hare Stadium; Auburn, AL (rivalry)		W 41–0	67,500	
October 12	No. 4 Florida State*	No. 12	Jordan-Hare Stadium; Auburn, AL	TBS	W 59–27	75,000	
October 19	at Georgia Tech*	No. 8	Grant Field; Atlanta, GA (rivalry)	CBS	W 17–14	57,501	
October 26	Mississippi State	No. 6	Jordan-Hare Stadium; Auburn, AL		W 21–9	68,700	
November 2	No. 2 Florida	No. 6	Jordan-Hare Stadium; Auburn, AL (rivalry)		L 10–14	75,000	
November 9	East Carolina*^{†}	No. 13	Jordan-Hare Stadium; Auburn, AL		W 35–10	65,600	
November 16	at No. 12 Georgia	No. 14	Sanford Stadium; Athens, GA (rivalry)	ABC	W 24–10	82,122	
November 30	vs. Alabama	No. 7	Legion Field; Birmingham, AL (Iron Bowl)	ABC	L 23–25	75,808	
January 1	vs. No. 11 Texas A&M*	No. 16	Cotton Bowl; Dallas, TX (Cotton Bowl Classic)	CBS	L 16–36	73,137	
*Non-conference game; ^{†}Homecoming; Rankings from AP Poll released prior to the game

== Roster ==
1985 Auburn Tigers football team roster
Players
Coaches
Offense

Pos.	#	Name	Class
QB	10	Pat Washington	Sr
RB	30	Tommie Agee	Sr
RB	34	Bo Jackson	Sr
OL	66	Jeff Lott	Sr
C	55	Ben Tamburello	Jr
OL	78	Steve Wallace	Sr
WR	85	Lawyer Tillman	Fr
TE		Jeff Parks	Sr

Defense

Pos.	#	Name	Class
SS	9	Tommy Powell	Jr
DE	95	Gerald Robinson	Sr
DE		Gerald Williams	Sr
CB	45	Jimmie Warren	Sr
LB		Harold Hallman	Sr

Special teams

Pos.	#	Name	Class
P	5	Lewis Colbert	Sr

Head coach

- Pat Dye

Coordinators/assistant coaches

- Steve Patterson

Legend

- (C) Team captain
- (S) Suspended
- (I) Ineligible
- Injured
- Redshirt

== Game summaries ==
=== At Tennessee ===
#1 Auburn (2-0) at Tennessee (0-0-1)

Team	1	2	3	4	Total
No. 1 Auburn	0	0	0	20	20
• Tennessee	14	10	0	14	38

- Date: September 28
- Location: Neyland Stadium, Knoxville, Tennessee
- Game attendance: 94,358

=== At No. 12 Georgia ===
Team	1	2	3	4	Total
• No. 14 Auburn	0	17	0	7	24
No. 12 Georgia	0	7	3	0	10

- Date: November 16
- Location: Sanford Stadium, Athens, Georgia
- Game attendance: 82,122

Scoring summary
Q2	AUB	Johnson 49 yard field goal	AUB 3–0
Q2	UGA	Jackson 3 yard run (Crumley kick)	UGA 7–3
Q2	AUB	Jackson 67 yard run (Johnson kick)	AUB 10–7
Q2	AUB	Weygand 8 yard run (Johnson kick)	AUB 17–7
Q3	UGA	Crumley 50 yard field goal	AUB 17–10
Q4	AUB	Jackson 6 yard run (Johnson kick)	AUB 24–10

- Bo Jackson 19 Rush, 121 Yds

=== Alabama ===
Team	1	2	3	4	Total
• Crimson Tide	10	6	0	9	25
No. 7 Tigers	0	10	0	13	23

- Date: November 30
- Location: Legion Field
- Game attendance: 75,808

Scoring summary
Q1		ALA	Turner 1-yard run (Tiffin kick)	ALA 7–0
Q1		ALA	Tiffin 26-yard field goal	ALA 10–0
Q2		ALA	Tiffin 32-yard field goal	ALA 13–0
Q2		AUB	Jackson 7-yard run (Johnson kick)	ALA 13–7
Q2		ALA	Tiffin 42-yard field goal	ALA 16–7
Q2		AUB	Johnson 49-yard field goal	ALA 16–10
Q4		AUB	Jackson 1-yard run (Johnson kick)	AUB 17–16
Q4		ALA	Jelks 74-yard run (pass failed)	ALA 22–17
Q4	:57	AUB	Ware 1-yard run (run failed)	AUB 23–22
Q4	:00	ALA	Tiffin 52-yard field goal	ALA 25–23

Van Tiffin game winning field goal.

== Awards and honors ==
- Bo Jackson, Heisman Trophy
- Bo Jackson, Walter Camp Award

== Team players in the NFL ==
Player	Position	Round	Pick	NFL club
Bo Jackson	Running back	1	1	Tampa Bay Buccaneers
