= Jon Hand =

American football player (born 1963)

No. 78
- Position: Defensive end

Personal information
- Born: November 13, 1963 (age 62); Sylacauga, Alabama, U.S.
- Listed height: 6 ft 7 in (2.01 m)
- Listed weight: 301 lb (137 kg)

Career information
- High school: Sylacauga
- College: Alabama
- NFL draft: 1986: 1st round, 4th overall pick

Career history
- Indianapolis Colts (1986–1994); New England Patriots (1995)*
- * Offseason or practice squad member only

Awards and highlights
- PFW NFL All-Rookie Team (1986); NEA NFL All-Rookie Team (1986); First-team All-American (1985); 2× First-team All-SEC (1984, 1985)

Career NFL statistics
- Total tackles: 539
- Sacks: 35.5
- Forced fumbles: 1
- Fumble recoveries: 7
- Interceptions: 1
- Stats at Pro Football Reference

Jon Thomas Hand (born November 13, 1963) is an American former professional football player who was a defensive end for the Indianapolis Colts of the National Football League (NFL) for nine seasons. Hand was selected by the Colts with the fourth overall pick in the 1986 NFL draft. He played college football at Alabama.

== Early life ==
Jon Hand was born on November 13, 1963, in Sylacauga, Alabama. Hand and his sister were raised by a single mother, who worked several jobs to support their family.

Hand was a multi-sport athlete at Sylacauga High School. He won the Alabama Class 3A shot put title as a junior and won both the shot put and discus state titles as a senior. As a senior, he set a Class 3A state record in shot put with a throw of 60' 6 1/4". In basketball, Hand was also a high-level prospect and helped lead the team to a Class 3A State runner-up finish as a senior.

On the football team, Hand's size helped propel him to the national stage. As a junior, Hand was named to the Alabama Class 3A All-State football team. Prior to his senior season, Hand was named a preseason high school All-American and received heavy recruitment from major college football programs. Hand repeated on the Alabama Class 3A All-State team and was named to the Parade All-America team. Both Alabama and Auburn were competing to recruit Hand, and he ultimately chose to play at Alabama.

== College career ==
Hand made the Alabama varsity squad as a freshman, and appeared in the team's first game of the season against Georgia Tech. He recorded one tackle and recovered a fumble that led to a touchdown in the 45-7 victory. Hand was used as a backup defensive tackle for the remainder of his freshman season. In what became coach Paul "Bear" Bryant's final season at Alabama, the team finished with an 8–4 record and defeated Illinois in the 1982 Liberty Bowl.

As a sophomore in 1983, Hand stepped into the starting defensive tackle role under new head coach Ray Perkins. Alabama began the season ranked No. 13 in the AP poll and worked their way up to No. 3 by the fifth week of the season. But after suffering losses to Penn State and Tennessee, the Crimson Tide's national championship hopes were dashed. Hand had his best game of the season against Mississippi State, where he forced a fumble and tipped a pass that led to an interception. Hand recorded 63 tackles, with five sacks and seven pass deflections on the season. Alabama finished with an 8–4 record and #15 ranking after defeating #6-ranked SMU in the 1983 Sun Bowl.

In 1984, Alabama had a down year. They started the season at 0–2 for the first time since 1956. Hand and linebacker Cornelius Bennett were the lone defensive bright spots on an otherwise disappointing Crimson Tide team. In a win over Southwestern Louisiana, Hand had six tackles, two sacks, one pass deflection, and one fumble recovery. Hand was named the AP Southeastern Conference (SEC) Player of the Week in Alabama's victory over Mississippi State, where he recorded 15 tackles. The Crimson Tide finished the season at 5–6, but upset rivals Auburn in the final week of the season. Hand was named to the 1984 All-SEC First-Team.

In 1985, Alabama returned to form and Hand recorded his best collegiate season. He had 77 tackles, seven tackles for losses, one sack, four pass deflections, three forced fumbles, one interception, and a blocked field goal. Alabama finished the season ranked No. 13 with a 9–2–1 record and earned a place in the 1985 Aloha Bowl against USC, winning 24–3. Hand earned his second All-SEC First-Team selection and was named to The Sporting News 1985 College Football All-America Team.

Hand was selected to play in the 1986 East-West Shrine Game, where he impressed with five tackles, one sack, three pass deflections, and a blocked field goal. He was given the Spaulding Award for the game's best defensive performance. He also was invited to play in the 1986 Senior Bowl.

== Professional career ==
Hand was selected by the Indianapolis Colts in the first round, fourth overall selection, of the 1986 NFL draft.

=== Indianapolis Colts (1986-1994) ===
As a rookie, Hand was moved from defensive tackle to defensive end. He started in all 15 games he appeared in that season, recording 82 total tackles with five sacks, one interception, and two fumble recoveries. Hand recorded his first NFL sack in week five against the San Francisco 49ers, taking down quarterback Jeff Kemp. He was named to both the 1986 NEA NFL All-Rookie Team and the Pro Football Weekly All-Rookie Team. The Colts lost their first 13 games of the season leading to head coach Rod Dowhower's dismissal. Ron Meyer took over as head coach and won the final three games, with the Colts finishing at 3–13 on the season.

The 1987 NFL season was shortened by a player strike. Week three was cancelled and the games during weeks four through six were played using replacement players. Hand played in all 12 games not affected by the strike. He recorded 67 total tackles with one sack on the season. In week two against the Miami Dolphins, Hand had seven solo tackles and blocked a punt. In the first week back from the strike, Hand recorded nine tackles in a victory over the New England Patriots. The Colts finished the year at 9-6 and made their first appearance in the playoffs since moving to Indianapolis. They lost to the Cleveland Browns in the Divisional Round.

In 1988, Hand continued to be productive for the Colts. He led the team in sacks (5) and had 73 total tackles on the season. Hand's best game of the season came in week 10 against the New York Jets where he recorded two sacks and one pass deflection that led to an interception. However, he suffered a groin injury late in the game that caused him to miss the following week, the only game he missed that season. The Colts finished with a 9–7 record, but missed the playoffs.

Hand had his best professional season in 1989, where he recorded 85 total tackles and 10 sacks. Hand and Ezra Johnson traded the team-lead in sacks for the majority of the season until week 12 where Hand had two sacks. Hand finished as the Colts' sack leader for the second consecutive season and tied for 14th in the NFL in the category. The Colts finished the year at 8-8 and did not make the playoffs.

Prior to the 1990 season, Hand entered a contract dispute with the Colts. His four-year rookie deal had expired, and Hand sought a higher paying contract with the team. His holdout lasted 49 days, ending prior to the Colts' week two match up against the New England Patriots. Despite not having practiced with the team during training camp or the preseason, Hand started in the game and recorded six tackles. Hand missed three weeks of the 1990 season due to a knee injury, playing in 12 total games. He finished the season with 63 total tackles and three sacks. The Colts ended the season with a 7–9 record.

Hand started in all 16 games of the 1991 season, and posted 60 total tackles and five sacks. His five sacks were tied for the team lead with linebacker Duane Bickett and veteran defensive end Donnell Thompson. Despite Hand's availability, the Colts started the season at 0-5 and fired head coach Ron Meyer. Defensive coordinator Rick Venturi took over as interim head coach, going 1–10 to finish the season at 1–15.

Under new head coach Ted Marchibroda, joining the team for his second head coaching stint, the Colts' 1992 season started on a positive note. In week one against the Cleveland Browns, the Colts defense tied a franchise record with 11 sacks. Hand contributed with one sack on the day. Hand suffered ankle and knee injuries early in the season. He missed one game, and upon returning found himself as the back-up to Skip McClendon. Hand was moved to the interior of the defensive line, and saw limited action in the second half of the season. He finished the year with 24 total tackles and one sack. The Colts rebounded from the previous season, finishing with a 9–7 record.

Coming into the 1993 season, Hand suffered a preseason groin injury. He missed the final three preseason games and week one of the regular season. Hand regained his starting role in week three against the Browns. He remained a starter and his best game of the season came against the Washington Redskins in week 10 where he had six tackles and two sacks. Despite battling a knee injury throughout the season, Hand had 78 tackles and a team-leading 5.5 sacks on the season. The Colts finished the year at 4–12.

Hand signed a new contract before the start of the 1994 season and returned for what became his final year. In week three, Hand suffered a severe ankle sprain and fractured fibula against the Pittsburgh Steelers. Hand missed 11 games before returning in a backup role for the final two games of the season.

Following the 1994 season, Hand was one of six Colts offered in the 1995 NFL expansion draft for the Carolina Panthers and Jacksonville Jaguars. Hand was not selected in the draft and he was subsequently released by the Colts on February 17, 1995.

During his nine-year career in Indianapolis, Hand started 110 of the 121 games in which he appeared. He led the Colts in sacks in four seasons (1988, 1989, 1991 [tied], and 1993).

=== New England Patriots (1995) ===
Hand was signed by the New England Patriots on March 31, 1995. He suffered a knee injury during training camp, which required arthroscopic surgery. Hand missed all four of the Patriots' preseason games and was released on August 28, 1995, prior to the start of the regular season.

== Personal life ==
Following his retirement from the NFL, Hand settled in the Indianapolis area. Hand became a franchisee of multiple Burger King restaurants.
