= Byron Lee (American football) =

American football player (born 1964)

No. 58
- Position: Linebacker

Personal information
- Born: September 8, 1964 (age 62); Columbus, Ohio, U.S.
- Listed height: 6 ft 2 in (1.88 m)
- Listed weight: 230 lb (104 kg)

Career information
- High school: Eastmoor Academy (Columbus)
- College: Ohio State
- NFL draft: 1986: 7th round, 176th overall pick

Career history
- Philadelphia Eagles (1986–1987); Los Angeles Raiders (1988)*; Columbus Thunderbolts (1991)
- * Offseason or practice squad member only

Career NFL statistics
- Sacks: 1
- Stats at Pro Football Reference

Byron Keith Lee (born September 8, 1964) is an American former professional football player who was a linebacker for two seasons with the Philadelphia Eagles of the National Football League (NFL). He played college football for Ohio State. He was selected by the New Jersey Generals in the 1986 USFL Territorial Draft, but did not sign with the team, as he was also chosen by Philadelphia in the seventh round (176th overall) of the 1986 NFL draft. He was waived by the Eagles during final roster cuts on August 19, 1986, but was re-signed on October 15. He played for the Eagles in 1986 and 1987, and was an offseason member of the Los Angeles Raiders in 1988. He played for the Columbus Thunderbolts of the Arena Football League (AFL) in 1991.
