= 1985 Kentucky Wildcats football team =

American college football season

1985 Kentucky Wildcats football
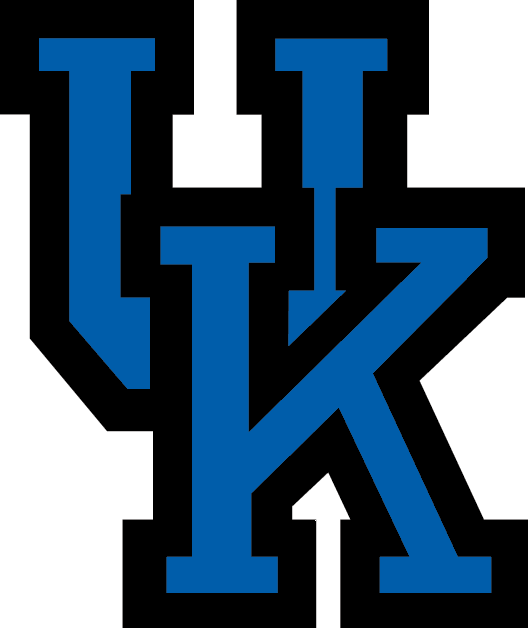
- Conference: Southeastern Conference
- Record: 5–6 (1–5 SEC)
- Head coach: Jerry Claiborne (4th season)
- Home stadium: Commonwealth Stadium

1985 Southeastern Conference football standings
	Conf.					Overall
Team	W		L		T	W		L		T
No. 4 Tennessee $	5	–	1	–	0	9	–	1	–	2
No. 5 Florida	5	–	1	–	0	9	–	1	–	1
No. 13 Alabama	4	–	1	–	1	9	–	2	–	1
No. 20 LSU	4	–	1	–	1	9	–	2	–	1
Georgia	3	–	2	–	1	7	–	3	–	2
Auburn	3	–	3	–	0	8	–	4	–	0
Ole Miss	2	–	4	–	0	4	–	6	–	1
Vanderbilt	1	–	4	–	1	3	–	7	–	1
Kentucky	1	–	5	–	0	5	–	6	–	0
Mississippi State	0	–	6	–	0	5	–	6	–	0
$ – Conference champion; Florida ineligible for SEC championship due to NCAA probation.; Rankings from AP Poll

The 1985 Kentucky Wildcats football team represented the University of Kentucky in the Southeastern Conference (SEC) during the 1985 NCAA Division I-A football season. In their fourth season under head coach Jerry Claiborne, the Wildcats compiled a 5–6 record (1–5 against SEC opponents), finished in ninth place in the SEC, and were outscored by their opponents, 211 to 194.

The team played its home games in Commonwealth Stadium in Lexington, Kentucky.

The team's statistical leaders included Bill Ransdell with 1,744 passing yards, Marc Logan with 715 rushing yards, and Cornell Burbage with 418 receiving yards.

== Schedule ==
Date	Opponent	Site	Result	Attendance	Source
September 14	Bowling Green*	Commonwealth Stadium; Lexington, KY	L 26–30	57,620	
September 21	Tulane*	Commonwealth Stadium; Lexington, KY	W 16–11	55,812	
September 28	Cincinnati*	Commonwealth Stadium; Lexington, KY	W 27–7	57,192	
October 5	Clemson*	Commonwealth Stadium; Lexington, KY	W 26–7	58,230	
October 12	Mississippi State	Commonwealth Stadium; Lexington, KY	W 33–19	58,345	
October 19	at No. 17 LSU	Tiger Stadium; Baton Rouge, LA	L 0–10	78,562	
October 26	at Georgia	Sanford Stadium; Athens, GA	L 6–26	81,498	
November 2	East Tennessee State*	Commonwealth Stadium; Lexington, KY	W 23–13	53,429	
November 9	at Vanderbilt	Dudley Field; Nashville, TN (rivalry)	L 24–31	41,076	
November 16	at No. 11 Florida	Florida Field; Gainesville, FL (rivalry)	L 13–15	73,672	
November 23	No. 16 Tennessee	Commonwealth Stadium; Lexington, KY (rivalry)	L 0–42	30,113	
*Non-conference game; Rankings from AP Poll released prior to the game

== Roster ==
1985 Kentucky Wildcats football team roster
Players
Coaches
Offense

Pos.	#	Name	Class
[[American football positions|]]
[[American football positions|]]

Defense

Pos.	#	Name	Class
[[American football positions|]]

Special teams

Pos.	#	Name	Class

}}

Head coach

- [[]]

Coordinators/assistant coaches

Legend

- (C) Team captain
- (S) Suspended
- (I) Ineligible
- Injured
- Redshirt
