= Eric Coss =

American football player (born 1963)

No. 62
- Position: Center

Personal information
- Born: June 12, 1963 (age 63); USA
- Listed height: 6 ft 3 in (1.91 m)
- Listed weight: 270 lb (122 kg)

Career information
- High school: Bethel Park (PA)
- College: Temple
- NFL draft: 1986: undrafted

Career history
- Baltimore Stars (1986)*; Dallas Cowboys (1987)*; New York Jets (1987)
- * Offseason or practice squad member only
- Stats at Pro Football Reference

Eric Coss (born June 12, 1963) is an American former professional football player who was a center for one season with the New York Jets of the National Football League (NFL). He played college football for the Temple Owls and was also a top wrestler in college. He was a replacement player for the Jets in 1987.

== Early life ==
Eric Coss was born on June 12, 1963.

== High School and College career ==
=== High school ===
He went to High School at Bethel Park (PA). In high school he was his team's captain. He led them to the 1980 WPIAL Championship game. He was also a two-time All-Conference selection. He was also a wrestler in high school. He was a two-time regional champion. He was also a letterman in track. He went to college at Temple University. He was ranked as a top-15 wrestler in his senior year.

=== Awards and honors ===
==== High school ====
- Bethel Park Athletic Hall of Fame (2011)

===== Football =====
- Two-Time All-Conference Selection (1980s)
- Team Captain (1980s)
- Big 33 Game (1980)

===== Wrestling =====
- Two-Time Regional Champion (1980s)

==== College ====
===== Wrestling =====
- Top-15 Ranked Wrestler (1985)

== Professional career ==
Coss was selected in the 1986 USFL territorial draft by the Baltimore Stars but he did not play for them. He also signed with the Dallas Cowboys but did not play for them either. In 1987 he played with the New York Jets as a replacement player and played in 3 games.

== Later life ==
In 2011, he was inducted into the Bethel Park Athletic Hall of Fame. His son, Colton, played college football at Pomona College.
