= Don Smith (running back) =

American football player (born 1963)

No. 47, 30
- Positions: Wide receiver, running back

Personal information
- Born: October 30, 1963 (age 63); Hamilton, Mississippi, U.S.
- Listed height: 5 ft 11 in (1.80 m)
- Listed weight: 200 lb (91 kg)

Career information
- High school: Hamilton
- College: Mississippi State
- NFL draft: 1987: 2nd round, 51st overall pick

Career history
- Tampa Bay Buccaneers (1987–1989); Buffalo Bills (1990); Miami Dolphins (1991)

Career NFL statistics
- Receptions: 40
- Receiving yards: 473
- Rushing yards: 165
- Rushing average: 4.1
- Total touchdowns: 3
- Stats at Pro Football Reference

Donald Michael Smith (born October 30, 1963) is an American former professional football player who was a running back in the National Football League (NFL).

Pre-draft measurables
| Height | Weight | 40-yard dash | 10-yard split | 20-yard split | Vertical jump | Broad jump | Bench press |
|---|---|---|---|---|---|---|---|
| 5 ft 11 1/4 in (1.81 m) | 199 lb (90 kg) | 4.67 s | 1.55 s | 2.63 s | 30.0 in (0.76 m) | 9 ft 6 in (2.90 m) | 11 reps |
All values from NFL Combine

After a successful college football career for the Mississippi State Bulldogs as a quarterback, he was selected by the Tampa Bay Buccaneers in the second round of the 1987 NFL draft with the 51st overall pick. After two seasons with the Buccaneers, Smith was signed by the Buffalo Bills, mainly to be their kick returner. He caught a career high 21 passes for 225 yards in 1990, while also returning 32 kickoffs for 643 yards. He scored a touchdown in Super Bowl XXV for the Bills in what turned out to be the final carry of his career. This was the Buffalo Bills' first touchdown in Super Bowl history.

== College statistics ==
| Year | Team | G | Passing | | | | | | | Rushing | | | Total Offense | |
| Year | Team | G | CMP | ATT | CMP% | YDS | TD | INT | RAT | ATT | YDS | TD | TOFF | TDR |
|---|---|---|---|---|---|---|---|---|---|---|---|---|---|---|
| 1983 | Mississippi State | 11 | 4 | 6 | 66.7 | 52 | 0 | 0 | 139.5 | 8 | 29 | 0 | 81 | 0 |
| 1984 | Mississippi State | 11 | 75 | 176 | 42.6 | 1,236 | 6 | 9 | 102.6 | 128 | 545 | 9 | 1,781 | 15 |
| 1985 | Mississippi State | 11 | 143 | 312 | 45.8 | 2,332 | 15 | 14 | 115.5 | 190 | 554 | 6 | 2,886 | 21 |
| 1986 | Mississippi State | 11 | 120 | 244 | 49.2 | 1,609 | 10 | 11 | 109.1 | 159 | 740 | 6 | 2,349 | 16 |
| Totals | | 44 | 342 | 738 | 46.3 | 5,229 | 31 | 34 | 110.5 | 485 | 1,868 | 21 | 7,097 | 52 |
