= Roland Barbay =

American football player (born 1964)

No. 95
- Position: Tackle

Personal information
- Born: October 1, 1964 (age 62); New Orleans, Louisiana, U.S.
- Listed height: 6 ft 4 in (1.93 m)
- Listed weight: 260 lb (118 kg)

Career information
- High school: Holy Cross School (New Orleans)
- College: LSU
- NFL draft: 1987: 7th round, 184th overall pick

Career history
- Seattle Seahawks (1987–1988)

Awards and highlights
- First-team All-SEC (1985); Second-team All-SEC (1986)
- Stats at Pro Football Reference

Roland Anthony Barbay Jr. (born October 1, 1964) is an American former professional football player who was a tackle for the Seattle Seahawks of the National Football League (NFL)in 1987. He played college football for the LSU Tigers and was selected by the Seahawks in the seventh round of the 1987 NFL draft.

Pre-draft measurables
Height	Weight	Arm length	Hand span	40-yard dash	10-yard split	20-yard split	20-yard shuttle	Vertical jump	Broad jump	Bench press
6 ft 3 3/8 in (1.91 m)	259 lb (117 kg)	32 1/2 in (0.83 m)	10 in (0.25 m)	5.18 s	1.83 s	3.00 s	4.59 s	21.5 in (0.55 m)	7 ft 7 in (2.31 m)	13 reps
All values from NFL Combine
