= 1985 Florida Gators football team =

American college football season

1985 Florida Gators football
- Conference: Southeastern Conference

Ranking
- AP: No. 5
- Record: 9–1–1 (5–1 SEC)
- Head coach: Galen Hall (2nd season)
- Defensive coordinator: Charlie Bailey (1st season)
- Home stadium: Florida Field

1985 Southeastern Conference football standings
	Conf.					Overall
Team	W		L		T	W		L		T
No. 4 Tennessee $	5	–	1	–	0	9	–	1	–	2
No. 5 Florida	5	–	1	–	0	9	–	1	–	1
No. 13 Alabama	4	–	1	–	1	9	–	2	–	1
No. 20 LSU	4	–	1	–	1	9	–	2	–	1
Georgia	3	–	2	–	1	7	–	3	–	2
Auburn	3	–	3	–	0	8	–	4	–	0
Ole Miss	2	–	4	–	0	4	–	6	–	1
Vanderbilt	1	–	4	–	1	3	–	7	–	1
Kentucky	1	–	5	–	0	5	–	6	–	0
Mississippi State	0	–	6	–	0	5	–	6	–	0
$ – Conference champion; Florida ineligible for SEC championship due to NCAA probation.; Rankings from AP Poll

The 1985 Florida Gators football team represented the University of Florida during the 1985 NCAA Division I-A football season. The season was the second for Galen Hall as the head coach of the Florida Gators football team, having coached the 1984 Gators' final eight games as their interim coach. Because of NCAA probation terms handed down the previous year, Hall's 1985 Florida Gators were ineligible to win the Southeastern Conference (SEC) title, receive a bowl bid, or appear on live television.

== Schedule ==
Date	Opponent	Rank	Site	TV	Result	Attendance	Source
September 7	at Miami (FL)*	No. 5	Orange Bowl Stadium; Miami, FL (rivalry)		W 35–23	80,227	
September 14	Rutgers*	No. 3	Florida Field; Gainesville, FL		T 28–28	71,708	
September 28	at Mississippi State	No. 11	Scott Field; Starkville, MS		W 36–22	34,588	
October 5	at No. 8 LSU	No. 11	Tiger Stadium; Baton Rouge, LA (rivalry)	TigerVision	W 20–0	78,598	
October 12	No. 14 Tennessee	No. 7	Florida Field; Gainesville, FL (rivalry)		W 17–10	74,432	
October 19	Southwestern Louisiana*^{†}	No. 5	Florida Field; Gainesville, FL		W 45–0	74,369	
October 26	Virginia Tech*	No. 2	Florida Field; Gainesville, FL		W 35–18	70,119	
November 2	at No. 6 Auburn	No. 2	Jordan-Hare Stadium; Auburn, AL (rivalry)		W 14–10	75,000	
November 9	vs. No. 17 Georgia	No. 1	Gator Bowl Stadium; Jacksonville, FL (rivalry)		L 3–24	82,327	
November 16	Kentucky	No. 11	Florida Field; Gainesville, FL (rivalry)		W 15–13	73,672	
November 30	No. 12 Florida State*	No. 6	Florida Field; Gainesville, FL (rivalry)		W 38–14	74,461	
*Non-conference game; ^{†}Homecoming; Rankings from AP Poll released prior to the game

== Roster ==
1985 Florida Gators football team roster
Players
Coaches
Offense

Pos.	#	Name	Class
RB	27	Neal Anderson	Sr
QB	12	Kerwin Bell	So
WR	89	Ricky Nattiel	Jr
FB	22	John L. Williams	Sr

Defense

Pos.	#	Name	Class

Special teams

Pos.	#	Name	Class

Head coach

- Galen Hall

Coordinators/assistant coaches

- Charlie Bailey (DC)
- Mike Heimerdinger (WR)

Legend

- (C) Team captain
- (S) Suspended
- (I) Ineligible
- Injured
- Redshirt

== Postseason ==
After the season, Sagarin Ratings (ELO-Chess), one of two NCAA recognized selectors created by Jeff Sagarin, an MIT math graduate and sports statistician, named Florida as the 1985 national champions, though Florida does not claim the title. Florida finished with a 9–1–1 overall record and an SEC record of 5–1, tying for first place in the ten-team SEC.
