= Albert Bell (American football) =

American football player (born 1964)

No. 88
- Position: Wide receiver

Personal information
- Born: April 23, 1964 (age 62); Birmingham, Alabama, U.S.
- Listed height: 6 ft 0 in (1.83 m)
- Listed weight: 170 lb (77 kg)

Career information
- High school: Los Angeles (CA) Crenshaw
- College: Alabama
- NFL draft: 1987: undrafted

Career history
- Cleveland Browns (1987); Green Bay Packers (1988)

Awards and highlights
- First-team All-SEC (1985); Second-team All-SEC (1986)

Career NFL statistics
- Games played: 5
- Games started: 0
- Stats at Pro Football Reference

Albert Bell II (born April 23, 1964) is an American former professional football player who was a wide receiver in the National Football League (NFL).

Bell was born in Birmingham, Alabama and played scholastically at Crenshaw High School in Los Angeles, California. He played collegiately at the University of Alabama.

Pre-draft measurables
Height	Weight	Arm length	Hand span	40-yard dash	10-yard split	20-yard split	20-yard shuttle	Vertical jump	Broad jump	Bench press
5 ft 10 3/4 in (1.80 m)	174 lb (79 kg)	30 in (0.76 m)	9 1/4 in (0.23 m)	4.63 s	1.61 s	2.69 s	4.50 s	29.5 in (0.75 m)	9 ft 6 in (2.90 m)	4 reps
All values from NFL Combine

Bell signed with the Cleveland Browns in 1987 as an undrafted free agent, but spent the year on the injured reserve list. The following year he was active for five games with the Green Bay Packers.
