= USFL draft =

The United States Football League had two types of drafts as their main sources for player recruitment: the collegiate draft and the territorial draft. The collegiate draft resembled its NFL counterpart, in which teams were given a position in the drafting order, based on their win and loss record for the previous year.

== Collegiate draft ==
This process was adopted from the National Football League, so that the USFL teams could have an equal opportunity to sign eligible players from college.

The draft started in the inaugural season of 1983 with 24 rounds (288 selections) also each team could select 26 players in a territorial draft (312 total) and was held over a two day period at the beginning of January (4 and 5).

In 1984 to accommodate six new expansion franchises, these teams were given an additional selection at the end of some of the rounds. The open draft had 19 rounds. The 1984 draft was held January 4–5.

The draft was reduced to 12 rounds in 1985, which in turn reduced the number of days to one.

For the 1984 and the 1985 seasons, the collegiate draft was given the official name: "United States Football League Player Selection Meeting".

In 1986, the USFL moved its draft to May with the plan move to a fall schedule that same year.

=== Process ===
Teams could select players from a list of college seniors or juniors. The order of selection was determined based on the team's win and loss record from the previous year. After a selection, the franchise had the unilateral right to negotiate a contract with that player or the ability to trade that player to another team. If for any reason, the franchise was unsuccessful in negotiating a contract (for example the player signed with the NFL), the club kept the player's rights, which would make him unavailable to play for any team in the USFL.

=== First overall picks ===
Draft	Date	Location	Player	Position	College	USFL team
1983	January 4, 1983	Grand Hyatt Hotel, New York	Dan Marino	QB	University of Pittsburgh	Los Angeles Express
1984	January 4, 1984	The Roosevelt Hotel, New York	Mike Rozier	RB	University of Nebraska–Lincoln	Pittsburgh Maulers
1985	January 3, 1985	Grand Hyatt Hotel, New York	Jerry Rice	WR	Mississippi Valley State University	Birmingham Stallions
1986	May 6, 1986	Grand Hyatt Hotel, New York	Mike Haight	OT	University of Iowa	Orlando Renegades

== Territorial draft ==
The USFL also practiced an annual territorial draft, in which teams from the league would have "protected" colleges from their respective states, from which they could select a number of players without them being subjected to the regular collegiate craft. This process was conceived by USFL founder David Dixon, in order to keep geographic interest in the franchises. With the territorial draft, local college or professional football players, would end up playing for the state's USFL team.

=== Eligibility ===
It started with each team being assigned a five-college pool that were deemed to be in the team's region, from which it selected 26 players. In the 1984 USFL territorial draft, each team had 20 selections to accommodate the new six expansion franchises.

In the 1985 USFL territorial draft, it was raised to six schools per team (25 selections), which was speculated in the media as a way to allow the New Jersey Generals to sign quarterback Doug Flutie.

=== Process ===
The territorial selections were conducted by the teams, who communicated their choices to the league's office in writing. Once "drafted", a player's USFL rights belonged to that club, and were ineligible from selection in the regular college draft.

The league's office in turn would send out these lists to all teams, prohibiting them from drafting these players in the regular USFL collegiate draft.

=== Dates and locations ===
Draft	Date	Location
1983	January 4, 1983	Grand Hyatt Hotel, New York
1984	January 4, 1984	The Roosevelt Hotel, New York
1985	January 3, 1985	Grand Hyatt Hotel, New York
1986	April 23, 1986	
