= 1985 Vanderbilt Commodores football team =

American college football season

1985 Vanderbilt Commodores football
- Conference: Southeastern Conference
- Record: 3–7–1 (1–4–1 SEC)
- Head coach: George MacIntyre (7th season)
- Offensive coordinator: John Cropp (1st season)
- Defensive coordinator: Kurt Van Valkenburgh (2nd season)
- Home stadium: Vanderbilt Stadium

1985 Southeastern Conference football standings
	Conf.					Overall
Team	W		L		T	W		L		T
No. 4 Tennessee $	5	–	1	–	0	9	–	1	–	2
No. 5 Florida	5	–	1	–	0	9	–	1	–	1
No. 13 Alabama	4	–	1	–	1	9	–	2	–	1
No. 20 LSU	4	–	1	–	1	9	–	2	–	1
Georgia	3	–	2	–	1	7	–	3	–	2
Auburn	3	–	3	–	0	8	–	4	–	0
Ole Miss	2	–	4	–	0	4	–	6	–	1
Vanderbilt	1	–	4	–	1	3	–	7	–	1
Kentucky	1	–	5	–	0	5	–	6	–	0
Mississippi State	0	–	6	–	0	5	–	6	–	0
$ – Conference champion; Florida ineligible for SEC championship due to NCAA probation.; Rankings from AP Poll

The 1985 Vanderbilt Commodores football team represented Vanderbilt University as a member of the Southeastern Conference (SEC) during the 1985 NCAA Division I-A football season. Led George MacIntyre in his seventh and final season as head coach, the Commodores compiled an overall record of 3–7–1 with a mark of 1–4–1 in conference play, placing eighth the SEC. Vanderbilt played home games at Vanderbilt Stadium in Nashville, Tennessee.

== Schedule ==
Date	Time	Opponent	Site	TV	Result	Attendance	Source
September 7		Chattanooga*	Vanderbilt Stadium; Nashville, TN		W 7–0	41,057	
September 14		at Kansas*	Memorial Stadium; Lawrence, KS		L 16–42	39,000	
September 21		at Iowa State*	Cyclone Stadium; Ames, IA		L 17–20	44,025	
September 28	11:30 a.m.	No. 15 Alabama	Vanderbilt Stadium; Nashville, TN	WTBS	L 20–40	41,186	
October 5		at Tulane*	Louisiana Superdome; New Orleans, LA		W 24–17	25,979	
October 12	6:00 p.m.	No. 20 LSU	Vanderbilt Stadium; Nashville, TN	PPV	L 7–49	40,962	
October 19		No. 16 Georgia	Vanderbilt Stadium; Nashville, TN (rivalry)		T 13–13	41,137	
October 26		at Ole Miss	Vaught–Hemingway Stadium; Oxford, MS (rivalry)		L 7–35	35,500	
November 9		Kentucky	Vanderbilt Stadium; Nashville, TN (rivalry)		W 31–24	41,076	
November 16		Virginia Tech*	Vanderbilt Stadium; Nashville, TN		L 24–38	35,286	
November 30		at No. 10 Tennessee	Neyland Stadium; Knoxville, TN (rivalry)		L 0–30	97,372	
*Non-conference game; Rankings from AP Poll released prior to the game; All times are in Central time
