= Louis Clark (wide receiver) =

American football player and executive (born 1964)

Los Angeles Chargers
- Title: Senior director of pro personnel

Personal information
- Born: July 3, 1964 (age 62); Tupelo, Mississippi, U.S.
- Listed height: 6 ft 0 in (1.83 m)
- Listed weight: 206 lb (93 kg)

Career information
- High school: Shannon (MS)
- College: Mississippi State
- NFL draft: 1987: 10th round, 270th overall pick

Career history

Playing
- Seattle Seahawks (1987–1992); Green Bay Packers (1993)*
- * Offseason or practice squad member only

Operations
- Jacksonville Jaguars (1997−2003) College scout; Jacksonville Jaguars (2003−2011) Assistant director of pro personnel; Jacksonville Jaguars (2011−2013) Director of pro personnel; Philadelphia Eagles (2013−2015) Pro scout; Philadelphia Eagles (2015) Senior director of pro personnel; San Diego / Los Angeles Chargers (2016−present) Senior director of pro personnel

Career NFL statistics
- Receptions: 67
- Receiving yards: 798
- Touchdowns: 5
- Stats at Pro Football Reference

Louis Steven Clark (born July 3, 1964) is an American former professional football player who was a wide receiver for six seasons for the Seattle Seahawks of the National Football League (NFL). He was selected by the Seahawks in the tenth round of the 1987 NFL draft. His brother Dave Clark played in Major League Baseball (MLB). He is currently the senior director of pro personnel for the Los Angeles Chargers.
