= Cornelius Bennett =

American football player (born 1965)

No. 55, 97
- Position: Linebacker

Personal information
- Born: August 25, 1965 (age 61); Birmingham, Alabama, U.S.
- Listed height: 6 ft 3 in (1.91 m)
- Listed weight: 240 lb (109 kg)

Career information
- High school: Ensley (Birmingham)
- College: Alabama (1983–1986)
- NFL draft: 1987: 1st round, 2nd overall pick

Career history
- Indianapolis Colts (1987)*; Buffalo Bills (1987–1995); Atlanta Falcons (1996–1998); Indianapolis Colts (1999–2000)
- * Offseason or practice squad member only

Awards and highlights
- 3× First-team All-Pro (1988, 1991, 1992); 5× Pro Bowl (1988, 1990–1993); NFL 1990s All-Decade Team; PFWA All-Rookie Team (1987); Buffalo Bills 50th Anniversary Team; Lombardi Award (1986); Unanimous All-American (1986); 2× First-team All-American (1984, 1985); SEC Player of the Year (1986); 3× First-team All-SEC (1984, 1985, 1986)

Career NFL statistics
- Tackles: 1,190
- Sacks: 71.5
- Forced fumbles: 31
- Interceptions: 7
- Stats at Pro Football Reference
- College Football Hall of Fame

Cornelius O'Landa Bennett (born August 25, 1965) is an American former professional football player who was a linebacker in the National Football League (NFL). He played for the Buffalo Bills from 1987 to 1995, Atlanta Falcons from 1996 to 1998, and the Indianapolis Colts from 1999 to 2000. Bennett was a five-time Pro Bowler, being elected in 1988, and 1990–1993, and won the AFC Defensive Player of the Year award twice (1988 and 1991).

== Early life ==
Bennett was born in Birmingham, Alabama. He played halfback and several other positions while attending Ensley High School in Birmingham. Bennett was an excellent basketball and baseball player during his high school career. Bennett was an all-state performer for the football team his senior year, amassing over 1,000 yards on 101 rushes. Bennett was nicknamed "Biscuit" by friends because he always had room for one more.

== College career ==
Bennett played for the University of Alabama from 1983 to 1986. Bennett was a first selection on the College Football All-America Team three times (1984–1986). He is one of only two Alabama players to be named to three All-America teams, the other being fellow linebacker Woodrow Lowe. As a senior, he won the Lombardi Award, SEC Player of the Year honors, and finished 7th in the balloting for the Heisman Trophy. In his four seasons at the University of Alabama, Bennett recorded 287 tackles, 21 1/2 sacks, and 3 fumble recoveries. His most famous play was in 1986 when he leveled Notre Dame quarterback Steve Beuerlein, immortalized in a painting by artist Daniel Moore titled simply, ‘The Sack.’ In 2005, Bennett was elected to the College Football Hall of Fame.

== Professional career ==
L. T.'s in a class all by himself. I'll put L. T. first, then Tippett, and Bennett behind him.

— Jets fullback Roger Vick, ranking the NFL's best pass rushers during the 1988 season.

After his college career, Bennett was selected by the Indianapolis Colts with the second pick of the 1987 NFL draft. The 1987 draft class was deemed the "Year of Linebacker", but Bennett was considered to stand "head-and-shoulders above the rest." Bennett was Alabama's highest draft selection since quarterback Richard Todd went 6th overall in 1976.

Bennett and the Colts were unable to come to an agreement on a contract. Bennett was then dealt to the Buffalo Bills from the Colts in a three-way trade that also included Los Angeles Rams running back Eric Dickerson and Bills running back Greg Bell. This trade occurred in the fall of the 1987 season, just before the trade deadline, and has been called "the trade of the decade" by The New York Times.

In the NFL, Bennett's talent at the left outside linebacker position helped the teams he played for to five Super Bowl appearances (four with Buffalo and one with Atlanta), but they lost them all (an NFL record he shares with offensive lineman Glenn Parker). In his 14 NFL seasons, he recorded 71 1/2 sacks, 7 interceptions, 31 forced fumbles, 27 fumble recoveries and three touchdowns (one interception, one fumble return, and one blocked field goal return).

At the time of his retirement, Bennett's 27 defensive fumble recoveries were the third most in NFL history.

Bennett was inducted into the Alabama Sports Hall of Fame in 2004.

Bennett is a cousin of former New England Patriots defensive end, the late Marquise Hill.

== NFL career statistics ==
Legend
	Led the league
**Bold**	Career high

=== Regular season ===
Year	Team	Games		Tackles					Interceptions				Fumbles	
Year	Team	GP	GS	Cmb	Solo	Ast	Sck	TfL	Int	Yds	TD	PD	FF	FR
1987	BUF	8	7	69	–	–	8.5	–	–	–	–	–	**5**	0
1988	BUF	16	16	103	–	–	**9.5**	–	**2**	30	0	–	3	**3**
1989	BUF	12	12	54	–	–	5.5	–	**2**	5	0	–	1	2
1990	BUF	16	16	96	–	–	4.0	–	–	–	–	–	3	2
1991	BUF	16	16	**107**	–	–	9.0	–	–	–	–	–	4	2
1992	BUF	15	15	81	–	–	4.0	–	–	–	–	–	2	**3**
1993	BUF	16	16	102	–	–	5.0	–	1	5	0	–	2	2
1994	BUF	16	16	77	58	19	5.0	–	–	–	–	–	1	**3**
1995	BUF	14	14	104	**81**	23	2.0	–	1	**69**	**1**	–	1	2
1996	ATL	13	13	60	52	8	3.0	–	1	3	0	–	2	2
1997	ATL	16	16	90	68	22	7.0	–	–	–	–	–	2	1
1998	ATL	16	16	92	69	23	1.0	–	–	–	–	–	0	2
1999	IND	16	16	105	72	**33**	5.0	**10**	–	–	–	**5**	**5**	2
2000	IND	16	15	50	36	14	3.0	6	–	–	–	4	0	1
Career		206	204	1,190	436	142	71.5	16	7	119	1	9	31	27

=== Postseason ===
Year	Team	Games		Tackles					Interceptions				Fumbles	
Year	Team	GP	GS	Cmb	Solo	Ast	Sck	TfL	Int	Yds	TD	PD	FF	FR
1988	BUF	2	2	0	–	–	0.0	–	0	0	0	0	**1**	0
1989	BUF	1	1	0	–	–	0.0	–	0	0	0	0	0	0
1990	BUF	3	3	2	2	–	0.0	–	0	0	0	0	0	0
1991	BUF	3	3	5	5	–	0.5	–	0	0	0	0	0	0
1992	BUF	3	3	7	7	–	**1.0**	–	0	0	0	0	0	0
1993	BUF	3	3	7	7	–	0.0	–	0	0	0	0	0	0
1995	BUF	2	2	**20**	12	**8**	0.0	–	0	0	0	0	0	0
1998	ATL	3	3	17	**15**	2	0.0	–	0	0	0	0	**1**	0
2000	IND	1	0	5	3	2	0.0	–	0	0	0	0	0	0
Career		21	20	63	51	12	1.5	–	0	0	0	0	2	0

== Personal life ==
In May 1997, Bennett committed "vicious acts" during a sexual assault of a woman at the Hyatt Regency hotel in Buffalo. He pleaded guilty and was sentenced to 60 days in jail for sexual misconduct. He was also placed on three years' probation, fined $500, ordered to perform 100 hours of community service, ordered to pay back $617 in medical bills for the woman, and ordered to undergo anger-management and substance-abuse counseling.

Bennett lives in Hollywood, Florida, with his second wife, Kimberly Bennett.

In May 2010, Bennett announced he will donate his brain for a CTE study, Chronic traumatic encephalopathy, of long-term brain injuries resulting from football-related injuries.
