= Mike Haight =

American football player (born 1962)

No. 79, 72
- Position: Offensive tackle

Personal information
- Born: October 6, 1962 (age 64); Manchester, Iowa, U.S.
- Listed height: 6 ft 4 in (1.93 m)
- Listed weight: 270 lb (122 kg)

Career information
- High school: Beckman (IA)
- College: Iowa
- NFL draft: 1986: 1st round, 22nd overall pick

Career history
- New York Jets (1986–1991); Washington Redskins (1992)

Awards and highlights
- Big Ten Offensive Lineman of the Year (1985); First-team All-Big Ten (1985); Second-team All-Big Ten (1984)

Career NFL statistics
- Games played: 63
- Games started: 43
- Stats at Pro Football Reference

Michael James Haight (born October 6, 1962) is an American former professional football player who was an offensive tackle in the National Football League (NFL) for the New York Jets and Washington Redskins. He was selected by the Jets in the first round of the 1986 NFL draft with the 22nd overall pick. He played college football at the University of Iowa and played high school football at Beckman High School.

Haight was the first overall pick in the 1986 United States Football League draft by the Orlando Renegades. However, the league ceased operations soon thereafter and Haight never signed nor played with the team.
