= Jeff Wickersham =

American football quarterback

Profile
- Position: Quarterback

Personal information
- Born: December 5, 1963 (age 62); Minot, North Dakota

Career information
- High school: Merritt Island (FL)
- College: LSU
- NFL draft: 1986: 10th round, 275th overall pick

Awards and highlights
- Ottawa Rough Riders (1987–1988)

Jeff Wickersham is a former collegiate American football player for the LSU Tigers of Louisiana State University.

== College ==
Wickersham came to the Louisiana State University (LSU) as a highly recruited quarterback out of Merritt Island, FL (located on the Atlantic coast east of Orlando, FL).

During his three years as the quarterback for LSU's football team, Wickersham completed 58.4% of his passes for 6,921 yards, which at the time were both the 3rd best performances in Southeastern Conference (SEC) history. Wickersham was also the first quarterback in LSU history to pass for over 5,000 career yards, the first LSU quarterback to throw for over 2,000 yards in three different seasons, the first LSU quarterback to throw for over 2,500 yards in a season (1983), and the first LSU quarterback to throw for over 350 yards in a game (368 yards vs, Mississippi State in 1983).

During his freshman year (1982), Wickersham was a backup to senior quarterback Alan Risher.

During his sophomore year (1983), Wickersham completed 57.3% of his passes for 2,542 yards and 7 touchdowns (including 1,064 yards to All-American Eric Martin). One notable performance came against Washington, the ninth-ranked team in the country. In a 40–14 LSU win, Wickersham ran for three touchdowns. LSU finished the year with a 4–7 record.

During his junior year (1984), Wickersham completed 57.1% of his passes for 2,165 yards and 12 touchdowns. Major victories include LSU's 23–3 victory at #15 Southern California and #10 LSU's 36–10 victory at #16 Kentucky (televised on ABC). LSU finished the year with an 8-3-1 record and a #15 ranking in the final Associated Press Poll.

During his senior year (1985), Wickersham completed 60.4% of his passes for 2,145 yards and 5 touchdowns. Major victories include #16 LSU's 14–0 victory at Ole Miss (televised by TBS) and #17 LSU's 10–7 win at Notre Dame (televised by USA). LSU finished the year with a 9-2-1 record and a #20 ranking in the final Associated Press Poll. By the end of his college career, Wickersham held the school's record for most passing yards, along with 15 other marks.

== Professional career ==
Wickersham was taken in the 10th round of the 1986 NFL draft by the Miami Dolphins. He was the 11th quarterback taken that year. On August 20, 1986, the Dolphins released Wickersham from their roster.

Jeff Wickersham also played for the Ottawa Rough Riders of the Canadian Football League for the 1987 and part of the 1988 seasons. He suffered a knee injury during an intrasquad game in '87 training camp which kept him out for most of the season
