= Garry James =

American football player (born 1963)

No. 32, 33
- Position: Running back

Personal information
- Born: September 4, 1963 (age 63); Marrero, Louisiana, U.S.
- Listed height: 5 ft 10 in (1.78 m)
- Listed weight: 214 lb (97 kg)

Career information
- High school: West Jefferson (Harvey, Louisiana)
- College: LSU
- NFL draft: 1986: 2nd round, 29th overall pick

Career history
- Detroit Lions (1986–1988); San Francisco 49ers (1990)*
- * Offseason or practice squad member only

Career NFL statistics
- Rushing attempts–yards: 423–1510
- Receptions–yards: 89–816
- Touchdowns: 14
- Stats at Pro Football Reference

Garry Malcolm James (born September 4, 1963) is an American former professional football player who was a running back for three seasons with the Detroit Lions of the National Football League (NFL). He played college football for the LSU Tigers and was selected by the Lions in the second round of the 1986 NFL draft with the 29th overall pick.

James played three seasons in the Lions backfield with fullback James Jones. The tandem became known as the "James Gang."
