= Van Tiffin =

American football player (born 1965)

No. 3, 1
- Position: Placekicker

Personal information
- Born: September 6, 1965 (age 61); Tupelo, Mississippi, U.S.
- Listed height: 5 ft 9 in (1.75 m)
- Listed weight: 155 lb (70 kg)

Career information
- High school: Red Bay (AL)
- College: Alabama
- NFL draft: 1987: undrafted

Career history
- Miami Dolphins (1987); Tampa Bay Buccaneers (1987)

Awards and highlights
- First-team All-American (1986); First-team All-SEC (1986); Second-team All-SEC (1983)
- Stats at Pro Football Reference

Van Leigh Tiffin (born September 6, 1965) is an American former professional football player who was a placekicker in the National Football League (NFL). He played college football for the Alabama Crimson Tide.

== Early life and education ==
Van Leigh Tiffin was born in Tupelo, Mississippi. He lived in Red Bay, Alabama, and attended Red Bay High School, attracting notice for his football ability.

== College career ==
Tiffin attended the University of Alabama where he was the Alabama Crimson Tide's primary placekicker from 1983 to 1986. He holds the school record for longest converted field goal, with a successful 57-yard attempt against Texas A&M in 1985. He held the school record for converting 135 extra point attempts until his son, Leigh Tiffin, broke it in 2009 by one; Van never missed, however, going 135 for 135, while Leigh required 142 attempts.

Tiffin's most notable kick came in the 1985 Iron Bowl against in-state rival Auburn. His 52-yard field goal lifted the Crimson Tide to a 25–23 victory as time expired. It has become part of Alabama lore, known mainly as "The Kick."

In 1986, Tiffin was named a first team All-American by Scripps Howard.

== Professional career ==
Tiffin spent one season in the National Football League with the Miami Dolphins and Tampa Bay Buccaneers.
