= 1986 NFL draft =

National Football League draft

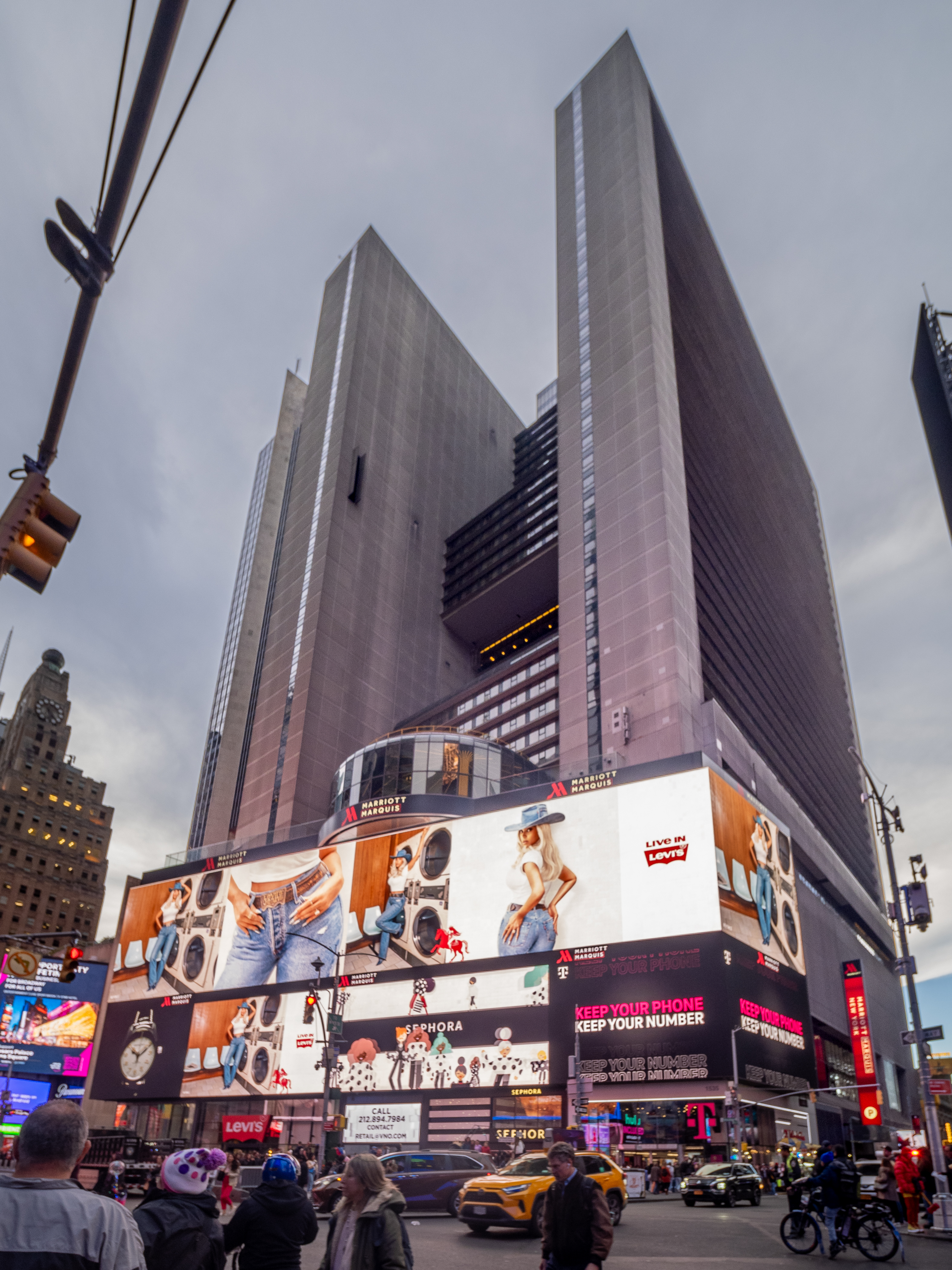
- New York Marriott Marquis (draft venue), photographed in 2024

General information
- Date: April 29–30, 1986
- Location: New York Marriott Marquis in New York City, New York
- Network: ESPN

Overview
- 333 total selections in 12 rounds
- League: National Football League
- First selection: Bo Jackson, RB; Tampa Bay Buccaneers
- Mr. Irrelevant: Mike Travis, DB; San Diego Chargers
- Most selections (17): Cincinnati Bengals; San Diego Chargers
- Fewest selections (8): Cleveland Browns
- Hall of Famers: 1: DE Charles Haley

The 1986 NFL draft was the procedure by which National Football League teams selected amateur college football players. It is officially known as the NFL Annual Player Selection Meeting. The draft was held April 29–30, 1986, at the Marriott Marquis in New York City, New York. The league also held a supplemental draft after the regular draft and before the regular season.

The first overall selection of the draft, Bo Jackson, had told the Tampa Bay Buccaneers prior to the draft that he would refuse to sign with the team. Disputes with team owner Hugh Culverhouse intensified after Jackson was ruled ineligible to play college baseball due to a trip he took on Culverhouse's jet. This angered Jackson, as the Buccaneers had assured him that the visit would not cause any NCAA violations. It was said that Jackson, who was having what he called his best year playing baseball in school, made the Buccaneers nervous and that by getting him ruled ineligible to play baseball, he would be forced to focus on football. Prior to the 1987 NFL draft, the Buccaneers forfeited their rights to Jackson.

== Player selections ==
| * | Compensatory selection |
| † | Pro Bowler |
| ‡ | Hall of Famer |

Positions key
| Offense | Defense | Special teams |
|---|---|---|
| QB — Quarterback; RB — Running back; FB — Fullback; WR — Wide receiver; TE — Tight end; OL — Offensive lineman; T — Tackle; G — Guard; C — Center | DL — Defensive lineman; DT — Defensive tackle (Note: Includes nose tackle (NT)); DE — Defensive end; EDGE — Edge rusher; LB — Linebacker (Note: Includes middle linebacker (MLB/MIKE), weakside linebacker (WILL), strongside linebacker (SAM), off-ball linebacker, and outside linebacker (OLB)); DB — Defensive back; CB — Cornerback; S — Safety (Note: Includes free safety (FS) and strong safety (SS)) | K — Kicker (Note: Also known as a placekicker (PK)); P — Punter; LS — Long snapper; RS — Return specialist (Note: Includes kickoff and punt returners) |

| Rnd. | Pick | Team | Player | Pos. | College | Notes |
|---|---|---|---|---|---|---|
| 1 | – | Buffalo Bills | Selection forfeited (Note: Buffalo forfeited a first-round selection after selecting QB Bernie Kosar in the 1985 supplemental draft.) | | | |
| 1 | 1 | Tampa Bay Buccaneers | Bo Jackson ^{†} | RB | Auburn | Heisman Trophy winner |
| 1 | 2 | Atlanta Falcons | Tony Casillas | DT | Oklahoma | |
| 1 | 3 | Houston Oilers | Jim Everett ^{†} | QB | Purdue | |
| 1 | 4 | Indianapolis Colts | Jon Hand | DE | Alabama | from New Orleans (Note: No. 4: New Orleans → Indianapolis (PD). New Orleans traded a first-round selection (4th overall) to Indianapolis in exchange for first- and third-round selections (6th and 60th overall).) |
| 1 | 5 | St. Louis Cardinals | Anthony Bell | LB | Michigan State | |
| 1 | 6 | New Orleans Saints | Jim Dombrowski | T | Virginia | from Indianapolis (Note: No. 6: Indianapolis → New Orleans (PD). See Round 1: New Orleans → Indianapolis.) |
| 1 | 7 | Kansas City Chiefs | Brian Jozwiak | T | West Virginia | |
| 1 | 8 | San Diego Chargers | Leslie O'Neal ^{†} | DE | Oklahoma State | from Minnesota (Note: No. 8: Minnesota → San Diego (D). Minnesota traded first- and third-round selections (8th and 66th overall) to San Diego in exchange for first- and second-round selections (14th and 44th overall).) |
| 1 | 9 | Pittsburgh Steelers | John Rienstra | G | Temple | |
| 1 | 10 | Philadelphia Eagles | Keith Byars ^{†} | FB | Ohio State | |
| 1 | 11 | Cincinnati Bengals | Joe Kelly | LB | Washington | |
| 1 | 12 | Detroit Lions | Chuck Long | QB | Iowa | |
| 1 | 13 | San Diego Chargers | James FitzPatrick | T | USC | |
| 1 | 14 | Minnesota Vikings | Gerald Robinson | DE | Auburn | from Green Bay via San Diego (Note: No. 14: Green Bay → San Diego → Minnesota. Multiple trades: Green Bay → San Diego (PD). Green Bay traded a first-round selection (14th overall) and a 1987 fifth-round selection to San Diego in exchange for the rights to S Mossy Cade. San Diego → Minnesota (D). See Round 1: Minnesota → San Diego.) |
| 1 | 15 | Seattle Seahawks | John L. Williams ^{†} | FB | Florida | |
| 1 | 16 | Buffalo Bills | Ronnie Harmon ^{†} | RB | Iowa | from Cleveland (Note: No. 16: Cleveland → Buffalo (PD). Cleveland traded first- and sixth-round selections (16th and 154th overall), and 1985 first- and third-round selections to Buffalo in exchange for QB Bernie Kosar.) |
| 1 | 17 | Atlanta Falcons | Tim Green | LB | Syracuse | from Washington (Note: No. 17: Washington → Atlanta (PD). Washington traded a first-round selection (17th overall), a 1985 second-round selection and RB Joe Washington to Atlanta in exchange for second- and sixth-round selections (30th and 141st overall), and a 1985 second-round selection.) |
| 1 | 18 | Dallas Cowboys | Mike Sherrard | WR | UCLA | from San Francisco (Note: No. 18: San Francisco → Dallas (D). San Francisco traded a first-round selection (18th overall) to Dallas in exchange for first- and fifth-round selections (20th and 131st overall).) |
| 1 | 19 | New York Giants | Eric Dorsey | DE | Notre Dame | |
| 1 | 20 | Buffalo Bills | Will Wolford ^{†} | T | Vanderbilt | from Dallas via San Francisco (Note: No. 20: Dallas → San Francisco → Buffalo. Multiple trades: Dallas → San Francisco (D). See Round 1: San Francisco → Dallas. San Francisco → Buffalo (D). San Francisco traded a first-round selection (20th overall) and a 1987 tenth-round selection to Buffalo in exchange for second- and third-round selections (29th and 56th overall).) |
| 1 | 21 | Cincinnati Bengals | Tim McGee | WR | Tennessee | from Denver (Note: No. 21: Denver → Cincinnati (PD). Denver traded first- and third-round selections (21st and 78th overall), and a 1987 fifth-round selection to Cincinnati in exchange for the rights to LB Ricky Hunley.) |
| 1 | 22 | New York Jets | Mike Haight | T | Iowa | |
| 1 | 23 | Los Angeles Rams | Mike Schad | T | Queen's | |
| 1 | 24 | Los Angeles Raiders | Bob Buczkowski | DE | Pittsburgh | |
| 1 | 25 | Tampa Bay Buccaneers | Roderick Jones | CB | SMU | from Miami (Note: No. 25: Miami → Tampa Bay (PD). Miami traded first- and second-round selections (25th and 40th overall) to Tampa Bay in exchange for LB Hugh Green.) |
| 1 | 26 | New England Patriots | Reggie Dupard | RB | SMU | |
| 1 | 27 | Chicago Bears | Neal Anderson ^{†} | RB | Florida | |
| 2 | 28 | Tampa Bay Buccaneers | Jackie Walker | LB | Jackson State | |
| 2 | 29 | Detroit Lions | Garry James | RB | LSU | from Buffalo via San Francisco (Note: No. 29: Buffalo → San Francisco → Detroit. Multiple trades: Buffalo → San Francisco (D). See Round 1: San Francisco → Buffalo. San Francisco → Detroit (D). San Francisco traded a second-round selection (29th overall) to Detroit in exchange for second- and third-round selections (39th and 71st overall).) |
| 2 | 30 | Washington Redskins | Markus Koch | DE | Boise State | from Atlanta (Note: No. 30: Atlanta → Washington (PD). See Round 1: Washington → Atlanta.) |
| 2 | 31 | New Orleans Saints | Dalton Hilliard ^{†} | RB | LSU | |
| 2 | 32 | St. Louis Cardinals | John Lee | K | UCLA | |
| 2 | 33 | Dallas Cowboys | Darryl Clack | RB | Arizona State | from Indianapolis (Note: No. 33: Indianapolis → Dallas (D). Indianapolis traded a second-round selection (33rd overall) to Dallas in exchange for a second-round selection (47th overall) and QB Gary Hogeboom.) |
| 2 | 34 | Houston Oilers | Ernest Givins ^{†} | WR | Louisville | |
| 2 | 35 | Kansas City Chiefs | Dino Hackett ^{†} | LB | Appalachian State | |
| 2 | 36 | Pittsburgh Steelers | Gerald Williams | DE | Auburn | |
| 2 | 37 | Philadelphia Eagles | Anthony Toney | RB | Texas A&M | |
| 2 | 38 | Cincinnati Bengals | Lewis Billups | CB | North Alabama | |
| 2 | 39 | San Francisco 49ers | Larry Roberts | DE | Alabama | from Detroit (Note: No. 39: Detroit → San Francisco (D). See Round 2: San Francisco → Detroit.) |
| 2 | 40 | Tampa Bay Buccaneers | Kevin Murphy | LB | Oklahoma | from Minnesota via Miami (Note: No. 40: Minnesota → Miami → Tampa Bay. Multiple trades: Minnesota → Miami (PD). Minnesota traded a second-round selection (40th overall) and LB Robin Sendlein to Miami in exchange for the rights to WR Anthony Carter. Miami → Tampa Bay (PD). See Round 1: Miami → Tampa Bay.) |
| 2 | 41 | Green Bay Packers | Kenneth Davis | RB | TCU | |
| 2 | 42 | New England Patriots | Mike Ruth | DT | Boston College | from Seattle (Note: No. 42: Seattle → New England (PD). Seattle traded a second-round selection (42nd overall) to New England in exchange for OT Bob Cryder.) |
| 2 | 43 | Cleveland Browns | Webster Slaughter ^{†} | WR | San Diego State | |
| 2 | 44 | New York Giants | Mark Collins | CB | Cal State Fullerton | from San Diego via Minnesota (Note: No. 44: San Diego → Minnesota → NY Giants. Multiple trades: San Diego → Minnesota (PD). See Round 1: Minnesota → San Diego. Minnesota → NY Giants (D). Minnesota traded two second-round selections (44th and 53rd overall) to the NY Giants in exchange for the rights to OT Gary Zimmerman.) |
| 2 | 45 | Washington Redskins | Walter Murray | WR | Hawaii | from San Francisco (Note: No. 45: San Francisco → Washington (D). San Francisco traded a second-round selection (45th overall) to Washington in exchange for a tenth-round selection (270th overall) and a 1987 first-round selection.) |
| 2 | 46 | New York Giants | Erik Howard ^{†} | DT | Washington State | |
| 2 | 47 | Indianapolis Colts | Jack Trudeau | QB | Illinois | from Dallas (Note: No. 47: Dallas → Indianapolis (D). See Round 2: Indianapolis → Dallas.) |
| 2 | 48 | Philadelphia Eagles | Alonzo Johnson | LB | Florida | from Washington via LA Raiders (Note: No. 48: Washington → LA Raiders → Philadelphia. Multiple trades: Washington → LA Raiders (PD). Washington traded a second-round selection (48th overall) to the LA Raiders in exchange for WR Malcolm Barnwell. LA Raiders → Philadelphia (PD). The LA Raiders traded a second-round selection (48th overall) to Philadelphia in exchange for LB Jerry Robinson.) |
| 2 | 49 | New York Jets | Doug Williams | T | Texas A&M | |
| 2 | 50 | Los Angeles Rams | Tom Newberry ^{†} | G | Wisconsin–La Crosse | |
| 2 | 51 | New York Giants | Pepper Johnson ^{†} | LB | Ohio State | from Denver (Note: No. 51: Denver → NY Giants (D). Denver traded second- and sixth-round selections (51st and 139th overall) and a 1987 second-round selection to the NY Giants in exchange for CB Mark Haynes.) |
| 2 | 52 | Miami Dolphins | John Offerdahl ^{†} | LB | Western Michigan | |
| 2 | 53 | New York Giants | Greg Lasker | S | Arkansas | from LA Raiders via Minnesota (Note: No. 53: LA Raiders → Minnesota → NY Giants. Multiple trades: LA Raiders → Minnesota (PD). The LA Raiders traded a second-round selection (53rd overall) and a 1985 sixth-round selection to Minnesota in exchange for LB Brad Van Pelt. Minnesota → NY Giants (D). See Round 2: Minnesota → NY Giants.) |
| 2 | 54 | New England Patriots | Vencie Glenn | S | Indiana State | |
| 2 | 55 | Chicago Bears | Vestee Jackson | CB | Washington | |
| 3 | 56 | San Francisco 49ers | Tom Rathman | FB | Nebraska | from Buffalo (Note: No. 56: Buffalo → San Francisco (D). See Round 1: San Francisco → Buffalo.) |
| 3 | 57 | New Orleans Saints | Rueben Mayes ^{†} | RB | Washington State | from Tampa Bay (Note: No. 57: Tampa Bay → New Orleans (PD). Tampa Bay traded a third-round selection (57th overall) to New Orleans in exchange for S Dave Greenwood.) |
| 3 | 58 | Cincinnati Bengals | Jim Skow | DE | Nebraska | from Atlanta (Note: No. 58: Atlanta → Cincinnati (PD). Cincinnati traded a third-round selection (58th overall) to Atlanta in exchange for QB Turk Schonert.) |
| 3 | 59 | St. Louis Cardinals | Gene Chilton | C | Texas | |
| 3 | 60 | New Orleans Saints | Pat Swilling ^{†} | LB | Georgia Tech | from Indianapolis (Note: No. 60: Indianapolis → New Orleans (D). See Round 1: New Orleans → Indianapolis.) |
| 3 | 61 | Houston Oilers | Allen Pinkett | RB | Notre Dame | |
| 3 | 62 | New Orleans Saints | Barry Word | RB | Virginia | |
| 3 | 63 | Kansas City Chiefs | Leonard Griffin | DE | Grambling State | |
| 3 | 64 | San Francisco 49ers | Tim McKyer | CB | Texas–Arlington | from Philadelphia (Note: No. 64: Philadelphia → San Francisco (PD). Philadelphia traded a third-round selection (64th overall) and a 1987 second-round selection to San Francisco in exchange for QB Matt Cavanaugh.) |
| 3 | 65 | Cincinnati Bengals | Mike Hammerstein | DE | Michigan | |
| 3 | 66 | San Diego Chargers | Terry Unrein | DE | Colorado State | from Minnesota (Note: No. 66: Minnesota → San Diego (D). See Round 1: Minnesota → San Diego.) |
| 3 | 67 | Pittsburgh Steelers | Bubby Brister | QB | Northeast Louisiana | |
| 3 | 68 | Seattle Seahawks | Patrick Hunter | CB | Nevada | |
| 3 | 69 | Detroit Lions | Joe Milinichik | T | NC State | from Cincinnati (Note: No. 69: Cleveland → Detroit (PD). Cleveland traded a third-round selection (69th overall) to Detroit in exchange for QB Gary Danielson.) |
| 3 | 70 | San Diego Chargers | Jeff Walker | T | Memphis State | |
| 3 | 71 | Los Angeles Rams | Hugh Millen | QB | Washington | from Detroit via San Francisco (Note: No. 71: Detroit → San Francisco → LA Rams. Multiple trades: Detroit → San Francisco (D). See Round 2: San Francisco → Detroit. San Francisco → LA Rams (D). San Francisco traded a third-round selection (71st overall) to the LA Rams in exchange for two fourth-round selections (96th and 101st overall) and QB Jeff Kemp.) |
| 3 | 72 | Green Bay Packers | Robbie Bosco | QB | BYU | |
| 3 | 73 | New York Giants | John Washington | DE | Oklahoma State | |
| 3 | 74 | Dallas Cowboys | Mark Walen | DT | UCLA | |
| 3 | 75 | Washington Redskins | Alvin Walton | S | Kansas | |
| 3 | 76 | San Francisco 49ers | John Taylor ^{†} | WR | Delaware State | |
| 3 | 77 | Buffalo Bills | Leonard Burton | C | South Carolina | from LA Rams (Note: No. 77: LA Rams → Buffalo (PD). The LA Rams traded a third-round selection (77th overall) and QB Vince Ferragamo to Buffalo in exchange for TE Tony Hunter.) |
| 3 | 78 | Cincinnati Bengals | David Fulcher ^{†} | S | Arizona State | from Denver (Note: No. 78: Denver → Cincinnati (PD). See Round 1: Denver → Cincinnati.) |
| 3 | 79 | New York Jets | Tim Crawford | LB | Texas Tech | |
| 3 | 80 | Los Angeles Raiders | Brad Cochran | CB | Michigan | |
| 3 | 81 | Miami Dolphins | T. J. Turner | DT | Houston | |
| 3 | – | New England Patriots | Selection forfeited (Note: New England forfeited a third-round selection as penalty for illegally placing WR Derwin Williams on injured reserve for the duration of the 1984 season.) | | | |
| 3 | 82 | Chicago Bears | David Williams ^{†} | WR | Illinois | |
| 4 | 83 | Tampa Bay Buccaneers | Craig Swoope | S | Illinois | |
| 4 | 84 | Green Bay Packers | Tim Harris | LB | Memphis State | from Buffalo (Note: No. 84: Buffalo → Green Bay (PD). Buffalo traded a fourth-round selection (84th overall) and a 1985 first-round selection to Green Bay in exchange for 1985 first- and second-round selections.) |
| 4 | 85 | Los Angeles Raiders | Mike Wise | DE | UC Davis | from Atlanta (Note: No. 85: Atlanta → LA Raiders (D). Atlanta traded a fourth-round selection (85th overall) to the LA Raiders in exchange for S Bret Clark.) |
| 4 | 86 | Indianapolis Colts | Bill Brooks | WR | Boston University | |
| 4 | 87 | Kansas City Chiefs | Tom Baugh | C | Southern Illinois | from Houston (Note: No. 87: Houston → Kansas City (PD). Houston traded a fourth-round selection (87th overall) and DE Bob Hamm to Kansas City in exchange for 1985 fifth- and sixth-round selections.) |
| 4 | 88 | New Orleans Saints | Kelvin Edwards | WR | Liberty | |
| 4 | 89 | St. Louis Cardinals | Carl Carter | CB | Texas Tech | |
| 4 | 90 | Kansas City Chiefs | Chas Fox | WR | Furman | |
| 4 | 91 | Cincinnati Bengals | Eric Kattus | TE | Michigan | |
| 4 | 92 | Detroit Lions | Devon Mitchell | S | Iowa | |
| 4 | 93 | Minnesota Vikings | Joe Phillips | DT | SMU | |
| 4 | 94 | Pittsburgh Steelers | Bill Callahan | DB | Pittsburgh | |
| 4 | 95 | San Diego Chargers | Ty Allert | LB | Texas | from Philadelphia (Note: No. 95: Philadelphia → San Diego (PD). Philadelphia traded a fourth-round selection (95th overall) and a 1987 eighth-round selection to San Diego in exchange for RB Earnest Jackson.) |
| 4 | 96 | San Francisco 49ers | Charles Haley^{‡}^{†} | DE | James Madison | from Cleveland via LA Rams (Note: No. 96: Cleveland → LA Rams → San Francisco. Multiple trades: Cleveland → LA Rams (PD). Cleveland traded a fourth-round selection (96th overall) to the LA Rams in exchange for the rights to WR Terry Greer. LA Rams → San Francisco (D). See Round 3: San Francisco → LA Rams.) |
| 4 | 97 | San Diego Chargers | Tommy Taylor | LB | UCLA | |
| 4 | 98 | Green Bay Packers | Dan Knight | T | San Diego State | |
| 4 | 99 | Cincinnati Bengals | Doug Gaynor | QB | Long Beach State | from Seattle (Note: No. 99: Seattle → Cincinnati (PD). Seattle traded a fourth-round selection (99th overall) to Cincinnati in exchange for TE Dan Ross.) |
| 4 | 100 | Dallas Cowboys | Max Zendejas | K | Arizona | |
| 4 | 101 | San Francisco 49ers | Steve Wallace ^{†} | T | Auburn | from Washington via LA Rams (Note: No. 101: Washington → LA Rams → San Francisco. Multiple trades: Washington → LA Rams (PD). Washington traded a fourth-round selection (101st overall) to the LA Rams in exchange for OT Dan McQuaid. LA Rams → San Francisco (D). See Round 3: San Francisco → LA Rams.) |
| 4 | 102 | San Francisco 49ers | Kevin Fagan | DT | Miami (FL) | |
| 4 | 103 | Los Angeles Raiders | Vance Mueller | RB | Occidental | from NY Giants (Note: No. 103: NY Giants → LA Raiders (PD). The NY Giants traded a fourth-round selection (103rd overall) to the LA Raiders in exchange for CB Ted Watts.) |
| 4 | 104 | Denver Broncos | Jim Juriga | T | Illinois | |
| 4 | 105 | New York Jets | Rogers Alexander | LB | Penn State | |
| 4 | 106 | Philadelphia Eagles | Matt Darwin | C | Texas A&M | from LA Rams (Note: No. 106: LA Rams → Philadelphia (PD). The LA Rams traded a fourth-round selection (95th overall) and a 1987 seventh-round selection to Philadelphia in exchange for DE Dennis Harrison.) |
| 4 | 107 | Miami Dolphins | James Pruitt | WR | Cal State Fullerton | |
| 4 | 108 | Los Angeles Raiders | Napoleon McCallum | RB | Navy | |
| 4 | 109 | New England Patriots | Scott Gieselman | TE | Boston College | |
| 4 | 110 | Chicago Bears | Paul Blair | T | Oklahoma State | |
| 5 | 111 | Buffalo Bills | Carl Byrum | RB | Mississippi Valley State | |
| 5 | 112 | Tampa Bay Buccaneers | J. D. Maarleveld | T | Maryland | |
| 5 | 113 | Washington Redskins | Ravin Caldwell | LB | Arkansas | from Atlanta (Note: No. 113: Atlanta → Washington (D). Atlanta traded a fifth-round selection (113th overall) to Washington in exchange for fifth- and sixth-round selections (128th and 159th overall).) |
| 5 | 114 | Houston Oilers | Jeff Parks | TE | Auburn | |
| 5 | 115 | New Orleans Saints | Reggie Sutton | CB | Miami (FL) | |
| 5 | 116 | St. Louis Cardinals | Jeff Tupper | DE | Oklahoma | |
| 5 | 117 | Indianapolis Colts | Scott Kellar | DE | Northern Illinois | |
| 5 | 118 | San Diego Chargers | Doug Landry | LB | Louisiana Tech | from Kansas City (Note: No. 118: Kansas City → San Diego (PD). Kansas City traded a fifth-round selection (118th overall) and a 1985 third-round selection in exchange for C Bob Rush.) |
| 5 | 119 | Detroit Lions | Oscar Smith | RB | Nicholls State | |
| 5 | 120 | Minnesota Vikings | Hassan Jones | WR | Florida State | |
| 5 | 121 | Philadelphia Eagles | Ray Criswell | P | Florida | |
| 5 | 122 | Pittsburgh Steelers | Erroll Tucker | CB | Utah | |
| 5 | 123 | Cincinnati Bengals | Leon White | LB | BYU | |
| 5 | 124 | Indianapolis Colts | Gary Walker | C | Boston University | from San Diego (Note: No. 124: San Diego → Indianapolis (PD). San Diego traded a fifth-round selection (124th overall) to Indianapolis in exchange for LB Vernon Maxwell.) |
| 5 | 125 | Green Bay Packers | Matt Koart | DT | USC | |
| 5 | 126 | Seattle Seahawks | Bobby Joe Edmonds ^{†} | WR | Arkansas | |
| 5 | 127 | Cleveland Browns | Nick Miller | LB | Arkansas | |
| 5 | 128 | Philadelphia Eagles | Dan McMillen | DE | Colorado | from Washington via Atlanta (Note: No. 128: Washington → Atlanta → Philadelphia. Multiple trades: Washington → Atlanta (D). See Round 5: Atlanta → Washington. Atlanta → Philadelphia (D). Atlanta traded a fifth-round selection (128th overall) to Philadelphia in exchange for LB Joel Williams.) |
| 5 | 129 | San Diego Chargers | Donald Brown | CB | Maryland | from San Francisco (Note: No. 129: San Francisco → San Diego (PD). San Francisco traded fifth- and eleventh-round selections (129th and 298th overall) to San Diego in exchange for DT Gary "Big Hands" Johnson.) |
| 5 | 130 | New York Giants | Vince Warren | WR | San Diego State | |
| 5 | 131 | San Francisco 49ers | Pat Miller | LB | Florida | from Dallas (Note: No. 131: Dallas → San Francisco (D). See Round 1: San Francisco → Dallas.) |
| 5 | 132 | New York Jets | Ron Hadley | LB | Washington | |
| 5 | 133 | San Diego Chargers | Matt Johnson | DB | USC | from LA Rams (Note: No. 133: LA Rams → San Diego (PD). The LA Rams traded a fifth-round selection (133rd overall) and OT Gary Kowalski to San Diego in exchange for WR Bobby Duckworth.) |
| 5 | 134 | Denver Broncos | Tony Colorito | DT | USC | |
| 5 | 135 | Pittsburgh Steelers | Brent Jones ^{†} | TE | Santa Clara | from LA Raiders (Note: No. 135: LA Raiders → Pittsburgh (PD). The LA Raiders traded a fifth-round selection (135th overall) to Pittsburgh in exchange for RB Jimmy Smith.) |
| 5 | 136 | Miami Dolphins | Kevin Wyatt | CB | Arkansas | |
| 5 | 137 | New England Patriots | Greg Robinson | G | Sacramento State | |
| 5 | 138 | Chicago Bears | Lew Barnes | WR | Oregon | |
| 6 | 139 | New York Giants | Ron Brown | WR | Colorado | from Tampa Bay via Denver (Note: No. 139: Tampa Bay → Denver → NY Giants. Multiple trades: Tampa Bay → Denver (PD). Tampa Bay traded a sixth-round selection (139th overall) to Denver in exchange for DE Brison Manor. Denver → NY Giants (D). See Round 2: Denver → NY Giants.) |
| 6 | 140 | Dallas Cowboys | Thornton Chandler | TE | Alabama | from Buffalo (Note: No. 140: Buffalo → Dallas (PD). Buffalo traded a sixth-round selection and a conditional twelfth-round selection (140th and 307th overall), and a 1985 fifth-round selection to Dallas in exchange for a 1985 fifth-round selection and CB Rod Hill.) |
| 6 | 141 | Kansas City Chiefs | Kent Hagood | RB | South Carolina | from Atlanta via Washington (Note: No. 141: Atlanta → Washington → Kansas City. Multiple trades: Atlanta → Washington (PD). See Round 1: Washington → Atlanta. Washington → Kansas City (PD). Washington traded a sixth-round selection (141st overall) to Kansas City in exchange for a 1985 seventh-round selection.) |
| 6 | 142 | New Orleans Saints | Robert Thompson | WR | Youngstown State | |
| 6 | 143 | Green Bay Packers | Burnell Dent | LB | Tulane | from St. Louis (Note: No. 143: St. Louis → Green Bay (PD). St. Louis traded a sixth-round selection (143rd overall) to Green Bay in exchange for QB Scott Brunner.) |
| 6 | 144 | Los Angeles Rams | Robert Jenkins | T | UCLA | from Indianapolis (Note: No. 144: Indianapolis → LA Rams (D). Indianapolis traded a sixth-round selection (144th overall) to the LA Rams in exchange for two seventh-round selections and a twelfth-round selection (172nd, 190th and 326th overall).) |
| 6 | 145 | Houston Oilers | Ray Wallace | RB | Purdue | |
| 6 | 146 | Washington Redskins | Mark Rypien ^{†} | QB | Washington State | from Kansas City (Note: No. 146: Kansas City → Washington (D). Kansas City traded a sixth-round selection (146th overall) to Washington in exchange for C Rick Donnalley.) |
| 6 | 147 | Minnesota Vikings | Thomas Rooks | RB | Illinois | |
| 6 | 148 | Pittsburgh Steelers | Domingo Bryant | S | Texas A&M | |
| 6 | 149 | Philadelphia Eagles | Bob Landsee | C | Wisconsin | |
| 6 | 150 | Dallas Cowboys | Stan Gelbaugh | QB | Maryland | from Detroit (Note: No. 150: Detroit → Dallas (PD). Detroit traded a sixth-round selection (150th overall) to Dallas in exchange for LB Angelo King.) |
| 6 | 151 | Denver Broncos | Orson Mobley | TE | Salem | from Green Bay (Note: No. 151: Green Bay → Denver (PD). Green Bay traded a sixth-round selection (151st overall) to Denver in exchange for QB Scott Brunner.) |
| 6 | 152 | Cincinnati Bengals | Gary Hunt | CB | Memphis State | |
| 6 | 153 | Seattle Seahawks | Eddie Anderson | S | Fort Valley State | |
| 6 | 154 | Atlanta Falcons | Floyd Dixon | WR | Stephen F. Austin | from Cleveland via Buffalo (Note: No. 154: Cleveland → Buffalo → Atlanta. Multiple trades: Cleveland → Buffalo (PD). See Round 1: Cleveland → Buffalo. Buffalo → Atlanta (PD). Buffalo traded a sixth-round selection (154th overall) to Atlanta in exchange for DL Don Smith.) |
| 6 | 155 | San Diego Chargers | Curt Pardridge | WR | Northern Illinois | |
| 6 | 156 | Washington Redskins | Jim Huddleston | G | Virginia | from San Francisco (Note: No. 156: San Francisco → Washington (PD). San Francisco traded a sixth-round selection (156th overall) to Washington in exchange for CB Tory Nixon.) |
| 6 | 157 | New York Giants | Solomon Miller | WR | Utah State | |
| 6 | 158 | Dallas Cowboys | Lloyd Yancey | G | Temple | |
| 6 | 159 | Atlanta Falcons | Keith Williams | RB | SW Missouri State | from Washington (Note: No. 159: Washington → Atlanta (D). See Round 5: Atlanta → Washington.) |
| 6 | 160 | Los Angeles Rams | Lynn Williams | RB | Kansas | |
| 6 | 161 | Denver Broncos | Mark Jackson | WR | Purdue | |
| 6 | 162 | San Francisco 49ers | Don Griffin | CB | Middle Tennessee | from NY Jets (Note: No. 162: NY Jets → San Francisco (PD). The NY Jets traded a sixth-round selection (162nd overall) to San Francisco in exchange for OT Billy Shields.) |
| 6 | 163 | Miami Dolphins | Brent Sowell | DT | Alabama | |
| 6 | 164 | Los Angeles Raiders | Doug Marrone | T | Syracuse | |
| 6 | 165 | Tampa Bay Buccaneers | Kevin Walker | CB | East Carolina | from New England (Note: No. 165: New England → Tampa Bay (D). New England traded a sixth-round selection (165th overall) to Tampa Bay in exchange for a 1987 fifth-round selection.) |
| 6 | 166 | Chicago Bears | Jeff Powell | RB | Tennessee | |
| 7 | 167 | Cleveland Browns | Jim Meyer | T | Illinois State | from Buffalo (Note: No. 167: Buffalo → Cleveland (PD). Buffalo traded a seventh-round selection (167th overall) to Cleveland in exchange for CB Lawrence Johnson.) |
| 7 | 168 | Buffalo Bills | Bob Williams | TE | Penn State | from Tampa Bay (Note: No. 168: Tampa Bay → Buffalo (PD). Tampa Bay traded a seventh-round selection (168th overall) to Buffalo in exchange for WR Perry Tuttle.) |
| 7 | 169 | Philadelphia Eagles | Cornelius Redick | WR | Cal State Fullerton | from Atlanta (Note: No. 169: Atlanta → Philadelphia (PD). Atlanta traded a seventh-round selection (169th overall) to Philadelphia in exchange for LB Reggie Wilkes.) |
| 7 | 170 | St. Louis Cardinals | Eric Swanson | WR | Tennessee | |
| 7 | 171 | Indianapolis Colts | Steve O'Malley | DT | Northern Illinois | |
| 7 | 172 | Indianapolis Colts | Chris White | K | Illinois | from Houston via LA Rams (Note: No. 172: Houston → LA Rams → Indianapolis. Multiple trades: Houston → LA Rams (PD). Houston traded two conditional middle-round selections to the LA Rams in exchange for WR Drew Hill; the conditional selections ended up being a seventh-round selection (172nd overall) and a 1987 fourth-round selection. LA Rams → Indianapolis (D). See Round 6: Indianapolis → LA Rams.) |
| 7 | 173 | New Orleans Saints | Gill Fenerty | RB | Holy Cross | |
| 7 | 174 | Cleveland Browns | Mike Norseth | QB | Kansas | from Kansas City (Note: No. 174: Kansas City → Cleveland (D). Kansas City traded a seventh-round selection (174th overall) to Cleveland in exchange for RB Boyce Green.) |
| 7 | 175 | Pittsburgh Steelers | Rodney Carter | RB | Purdue | |
| 7 | 176 | Philadelphia Eagles | Byron Lee | LB | Ohio State | |
| 7 | 177 | Cincinnati Bengals | Pat Franklin | RB | Southwest Texas State | |
| 7 | 178 | Buffalo Bills | Mark Pike | LB | Georgia Tech | from Detroit (Note: No. 178: Detroit → Buffalo (PD). Detroit traded a seventh-round selection (178th overall) to Buffalo in exchange for QB Joe Ferguson.) |
| 7 | 179 | Minnesota Vikings | Carl Hilton | TE | Houston | |
| 7 | 180 | Buffalo Bills | Butch Rolle | TE | Michigan State | from Seattle (Note: No. 180: Seattle → Buffalo (PD). Seattle traded a seventh-round selection (180th overall) to Buffalo in exchange for G Jon Borchardt.) |
| 7 | 181 | Seattle Seahawks | Paul Miles | RB | Nebraska | from Cleveland (Note: No. 181: Cleveland → Seattle (PD). Cleveland traded a seventh-round selection (181st overall) to Seattle in exchange for the rights to DE Sam Clancy.) |
| 7 | 182 | San Diego Chargers | Fred Smalls | LB | West Virginia | |
| 7 | 183 | Green Bay Packers | Ed Berry | CB | Utah State | |
| 7 | 184 | New York Giants | Jon Francis | RB | Boise State | |
| 7 | 185 | Dallas Cowboys | Johnny Holloway | WR | Kansas | |
| 7 | 186 | Washington Redskins | Rick Badanjek | RB | Maryland | |
| 7 | 187 | New England Patriots | Ray McDonald | WR | Florida | from San Francisco (Note: No. 187: San Francisco → New England (PD). San Francisco traded a conditional seventh-round selection (187th overall) and a 1985 eighth-round selection to New England in exchange for QB Matt Cavanaugh; the trade also included a conditional selection that may have been exercised as a 1984 seventh-round selection.) |
| 7 | 188 | Denver Broncos | Raymond Phillips | LB | NC State | |
| 7 | 189 | New York Jets | Bob White | T | Rhode Island | |
| 7 | 190 | Indianapolis Colts | Tommy Sims | S | Tennessee | from LA Rams (Note: No. 190: LA Rams → Indianapolis (D). See Round 6: Indianapolis → LA Rams.) |
| 7 | 191 | Los Angeles Raiders | Bill Lewis | C | Nebraska | |
| 7 | 192 | New England Patriots | Brent Williams | DE | Toledo | |
| 7 | 193 | Miami Dolphins | Larry Kolic | LB | Ohio State | |
| 7 | 194 | Chicago Bears | Bruce Jones | DB | North Alabama | |
| 8 | 195 | Los Angeles Rams | Steve Jarecki | LB | UCLA | from Tampa Bay (Note: No. 195: Tampa Bay → LA Rams (PD). Tampa Bay traded an eighth-round selection (195th overall) to the LA Rams in exchange for CB Ivory Sully.) |
| 8 | 196 | Kansas City Chiefs | Lewis Colbert | P | Auburn | from Buffalo (Note: No. 196: Buffalo → Kansas City (D). Buffalo traded an eighth-round selection (196th overall) to Kansas City in exchange for eighth- and twelfth-round selections (202nd and 313th overall).) |
| 8 | 197 | Atlanta Falcons | Kevin Hudgens | DE | Idaho State | |
| 8 | 198 | Indianapolis Colts | Trell Hooper | CB | Memphis State | |
| 8 | 199 | Houston Oilers | Larry Griffin | CB | North Carolina | |
| 8 | 200 | New Orleans Saints | Filipo Mokofisi | LB | Utah | |
| 8 | 201 | St. Louis Cardinals | Ray Brown ^{†} | G | Arkansas State | |
| 8 | 202 | Buffalo Bills | Tony Furjanic | LB | Notre Dame | from Kansas City (Note: No. 202: Kansas City → Buffalo (D). See Round 8: Buffalo → Kansas City.) |
| 8 | 203 | San Francisco 49ers | Jim Popp | TE | Vanderbilt | from Philadelphia (Note: No. 203: Philadelphia → San Francisco (PD). Philadelphia traded an eighth-round selection (203rd overall) to San Francisco in exchange for WR Keith Baker.) |
| 8 | 204 | Cincinnati Bengals | David Douglas | G | Tennessee | |
| 8 | 205 | Detroit Lions | Allyn Griffin | WR | Wyoming | |
| 8 | 206 | Minnesota Vikings | Gary Schippang | T | West Chester (PA) | |
| 8 | 207 | Pittsburgh Steelers | Cap Boso | TE | Illinois | |
| 8 | 208 | Philadelphia Eagles | Seth Joyner ^{†} | LB | UTEP | from Cleveland (Note: No. 208: Cleveland → Philadelphia (??). Cleveland traded an eighth-round selection (208th overall) to Philadelphia in exchange for LB Anthony Griggs.) |
| 8 | 209 | San Diego Chargers | Mike Perrino | T | Notre Dame | |
| 8 | 210 | Green Bay Packers | Michael Cline | DT | Arkansas State | |
| 8 | 211 | Seattle Seahawks | Alonzo Mitz | DE | Florida | |
| 8 | 212 | Dallas Cowboys | Topper Clemons | RB | Wake Forest | |
| 8 | 213 | Washington Redskins | Kurt Gouveia | LB | BYU | |
| 8 | – | San Francisco 49ers | Selection forfeited (Note: San Francisco forfeited an eighth-round selection after selecting RB Roosevelt Snipes in the 1985 supplemental draft.) | | | |
| 8 | 214 | New York Giants | Steve Cisowski | T | Santa Clara | |
| 8 | 215 | New York Jets | Robert Ducksworth | CB | Southern Miss | |
| 8 | 216 | Los Angeles Rams | Hank Goebel | T | Cal State Fullerton | |
| 8 | 217 | Denver Broncos | Bruce Klosterman | LB | South Dakota State | |
| 8 | 218 | Miami Dolphins | John Stuart | T | Texas | |
| 8 | 219 | Los Angeles Raiders | Joe Mauntel | LB | Eastern Kentucky | |
| 8 | 220 | New England Patriots | Greg Baty | TE | Stanford | |
| 8 | 221 | Chicago Bears | Maurice Douglass | S | Kentucky | |
| 9 | 222 | Buffalo Bills | Reggie Bynum | WR | Oregon State | |
| 9 | 223 | Tampa Bay Buccaneers | Tommy Barnhardt | P | North Carolina | |
| 9 | 224 | Atlanta Falcons | Kevin Starks | TE | Minnesota | |
| 9 | 225 | Houston Oilers | Bob Sebring | LB | Illinois | |
| 9 | 226 | New Orleans Saints | Merlon Jones | LB | Florida A&M | |
| 9 | 227 | St. Louis Cardinals | Kent Kafentzis | DB | Hawaii | |
| 9 | 228 | Indianapolis Colts | Bob Brotzki | T | Syracuse | |
| 9 | 229 | Kansas City Chiefs | Gary Baldinger | DE | Wake Forest | |
| 9 | 230 | Cincinnati Bengals | Cary Whittingham | LB | BYU | |
| 9 | 231 | Detroit Lions | Lyle Pickens | DB | Colorado | |
| 9 | 232 | Minnesota Vikings | Mike Slaton | DB | South Dakota | |
| 9 | 233 | Philadelphia Eagles | Clyde Simmons ^{†} | DE | Western Carolina | |
| 9 | 234 | Pittsburgh Steelers | Anthony Henton | LB | Troy State | |
| 9 | 235 | San Diego Chargers | Mike Zordich | S | Penn State | |
| 9 | 236 | Green Bay Packers | Brent Moore | DT | USC | |
| 9 | 237 | Seattle Seahawks | Mike Black | T | Sacramento State | |
| 9 | 238 | Cleveland Browns | Danny Taylor | DB | UTEP | |
| 9 | 239 | Washington Redskins | Wayne Asberry | DB | Texas A&M | |
| 9 | 240 | San Francisco 49ers | Tony Cherry | RB | Oregon | |
| 9 | 241 | New York Giants | Jim Luebbers | DE | Iowa State | |
| 9 | 242 | Dallas Cowboys | John Ionata | G | Florida State | |
| 9 | 243 | Los Angeles Rams | Elbert Watts | CB | USC | |
| 9 | 244 | Denver Broncos | Joe Thomas | WR | Mississippi Valley State | |
| 9 | 245 | New York Jets | Nuu Faaola | RB | Hawaii | |
| 9 | 246 | Los Angeles Raiders | Zeph Lee | RB | USC | |
| 9 | 247 | Miami Dolphins | Reyna Thompson ^{†} | S | Baylor | |
| 9 | 248 | New England Patriots | George Colton | G | Maryland | |
| 9 | 249 | Chicago Bears | John Teltschik | P | Texas | |
| 10 | 250 | Tampa Bay Buccaneers | Benton Reed | DE | Ole Miss | |
| 10 | 251 | Buffalo Bills | Guy Teafatiller | DT | Illinois | |
| 10 | 252 | Atlanta Falcons | Tony Baker | RB | East Carolina | |
| 10 | 253 | New Orleans Saints | Jon Dumbauld | DE | Kentucky | |
| 10 | 254 | St. Louis Cardinals | Vai Sikahema ^{†} | RB | BYU | |
| 10 | 255 | St. Louis Cardinals | Wes Smith | WR | East Texas State | from Indianapolis (Note: No. 255: Indianapolis → St. Louis (PD). Indianapolis traded a tenth-round selection (255th overall) to St. Louis in exchange for LB Dave Ahrens.) |
| 10 | 256 | Houston Oilers | Don Sommer | G | UTEP | |
| 10 | 257 | Kansas City Chiefs | Ike Readon | DT | Hampton | |
| 10 | 258 | Detroit Lions | Tracy Johnson | LB | Morningside | |
| 10 | 259 | Minnesota Vikings | Joe Cormier | WR | USC | |
| 10 | 260 | Pittsburgh Steelers | Warren Seitz | WR | Missouri | |
| 10 | 261 | Philadelphia Eagles | Junior Tautalatasi | RB | Washington State | |
| 10 | 262 | Cincinnati Bengals | Jeff Shaw | DT | Salem | |
| 10 | 263 | Green Bay Packers | Gary Spann | LB | TCU | |
| 10 | 264 | Seattle Seahawks | Don Fairbanks | DE | Colorado | |
| 10 | 265 | Cleveland Browns | Willie Smith | TE | Miami (FL) | |
| 10 | 266 | Indianapolis Colts | Peter Anderson | G | Georgia | from San Diego (Note: No. 266: San Diego → Indianapolis (PD). San Diego traded a tenth-round selection (266th overall) to Indianapolis in exchange for QB Mark Herrmann.) |
| 10 | 267 | San Francisco 49ers | Elliston Stinson | WR | Rice | |
| 10 | 268 | New York Giants | Jerry Kimmel | LB | Syracuse | |
| 10 | 269 | Dallas Cowboys | Bryan Chester | G | Texas | |
| 10 | 270 | San Francisco 49ers | Harold Hallman | LB | Auburn | from Washington (Note: No. 270: Washington → San Francisco (D). See Round 2: San Francisco → Washington.) |
| 10 | 271 | Denver Broncos | Victor Hall | TE | Jackson State | |
| 10 | 272 | New York Jets | Carl Carr | LB | North Carolina | |
| 10 | 273 | Los Angeles Rams | Garrett Breeland | DE | USC | |
| 10 | 274 | Miami Dolphins | Jeff Wickersham | QB | LSU | |
| 10 | 275 | Los Angeles Raiders | Jeff Reinke | DE | Mankato State | |
| 10 | 276 | New England Patriots | Cletis Jones | RB | Florida State | |
| 10 | 277 | Chicago Bears | Barton Hundley | DB | Kansas State | |
| 11 | 278 | Buffalo Bills | Tony Garbarczyk | DT | Wake Forest | |
| 11 | 279 | Tampa Bay Buccaneers | Mark Drenth | T | Purdue | |
| 11 | 280 | Atlanta Falcons | Chris Hegg | QB | Northeast Missouri State | |
| 11 | 281 | St. Louis Cardinals | Wayne Dillard | LB | Alcorn State | |
| 11 | 282 | Buffalo Bills | Billy Witt | DE | North Alabama | from Indianapolis (Note: No. 282: Indianapolis → Buffalo (PD). Indianapolis traded an eleventh-round selection (282nd overall) to Buffalo in exchange for QB Matt Kofler.) |
| 11 | 283 | Houston Oilers | Mark Cochran | T | Baylor | |
| 11 | 284 | New Orleans Saints | Pat Swoopes | DT | Mississippi State | |
| 11 | 285 | Kansas City Chiefs | Aaron Pearson | LB | Mississippi State | |
| 11 | 286 | Minnesota Vikings | John Armstrong | WR | Richmond | |
| 11 | 287 | Pittsburgh Steelers | Larry Station | LB | Iowa | |
| 11 | 288 | Philadelphia Eagles | Steve Bogdalek | G | Michigan State | |
| 11 | 289 | Cincinnati Bengals | Tim Stone | T | Kansas State | |
| 11 | 290 | Detroit Lions | Leland D. Melvin | WR | Richmond | |
| 11 | 291 | Seattle Seahawks | David Norrie | QB | UCLA | |
| 11 | 292 | Cleveland Browns | Randy Dausin | RB | Texas A&M | |
| 11 | 293 | San Diego Chargers | Chuck Sanders | RB | Slippery Rock | |
| 11 | 294 | Cincinnati Bengals | Tom Flaherty | LB | Northwestern | from Green Bay (Note: No. 294: Green Bay → Cincinnati (PD). Green Bay traded an eleventh-round selection (294th overall) to Cincinnati in exchange for OL Mike Obrovac.) |
| 11 | 295 | New York Giants | Len Lynch | G | Maryland | |
| 11 | 296 | Dallas Cowboys | Garth Jax | LB | Florida State | |
| 11 | 297 | Washington Redskins | Kenny Fells | RB | Henderson State | |
| 11 | 298 | San Diego Chargers | Drew Smetana | T | Oregon | from San Francisco (Note: No. 298: San Francisco → San Diego (PD). See Round 5: San Francisco → San Diego.) |
| 11 | 299 | New York Jets | Vince Amoia | RB | Arizona State | |
| 11 | 300 | Los Angeles Rams | Chul Schwanke | RB | South Dakota | |
| 11 | 301 | Denver Broncos | Thomas Dendy | RB | South Carolina | |
| 11 | 302 | Los Angeles Raiders | Randell Webster | LB | Southwestern Oklahoma State | |
| 11 | 303 | Miami Dolphins | Arnold Franklin | TE | North Carolina | |
| 11 | 304 | New England Patriots | Gene Thomas | WR | Pacific | |
| 11 | 305 | Chicago Bears | Glen Kozlowski | WR | BYU | |
| 12 | 306 | Tampa Bay Buccaneers | Clay Miller | G | Michigan | |
| 12 | 307 | Dallas Cowboys | Chris Duliban | LB | Texas | from Buffalo (Note: No. 307: Buffalo → Dallas (PD). See Round 6: Buffalo → Dallas.) |
| 12 | 308 | Atlanta Falcons | Steve Griffin | WR | Purdue | |
| 12 | 309 | Indianapolis Colts | Steve Wade | DT | Vanderbilt | |
| 12 | 310 | Houston Oilers | Chuck Banks | FB | West Virginia Tech | |
| 12 | 311 | New Orleans Saints | Sebastian Brown | WR | Bethune-Cookman | |
| 12 | 312 | St. Louis Cardinals | Kent Austin | QB | Ole Miss | |
| 12 | 313 | Buffalo Bills | Brian McClure | QB | Bowling Green | from Kansas City (Note: No. 313: Kansas City → Buffalo (D). See Round 8: Buffalo → Kansas City.) |
| 12 | 314 | Pittsburgh Steelers | Mike Williams | LB | Tulsa | |
| 12 | 315 | Philadelphia Eagles | Reggie Singletary | DE | NC State | |
| 12 | 316 | Cincinnati Bengals | Steve Bradley | QB | Indiana | |
| 12 | 317 | Detroit Lions | Allan Durden | DB | Arizona | |
| 12 | 318 | Minnesota Vikings | Jesse Solomon | LB | Florida State | |
| 12 | 319 | Cleveland Browns | King Simmons | DB | Texas Tech | |
| 12 | 320 | San Diego Chargers | Jeff Sprowls | DB | BYU | |
| 12 | 321 | Seattle Seahawks | John McVeigh | LB | Miami (FL) | |
| 12 | 322 | Dallas Cowboys | Tony Flack | DB | Georgia | |
| 12 | 323 | Washington Redskins | Eric Yarber | WR | Idaho | |
| 12 | 324 | Tampa Bay Buccaneers | Mike Crawford | RB | Arizona State | from San Francisco (Note: No. 324: San Francisco → Tampa Bay (PD). San Francisco traded a twelfth-round selection (324th overall) to Tampa Bay in exchange for the rights to OL Jim Leonard.) |
| 12 | 325 | Philadelphia Eagles | Bobby Howard | RB | Indiana | from NY Giants (Note: No. 325: NY Giants → Philadelphia (??). The NY Giants traded a twelfth-round selection (325th overall) to Philadelphia in exchange for past considerations.) |
| 12 | 326 | Indianapolis Colts | Isaac Williams | DT | Florida State | from LA Rams (Note: No. 326: LA Rams → Indianapolis (D). See Round 6: Indianapolis → LA Rams.) |
| 12 | 327 | Los Angeles Rams | Marcus Dupree | RB | Oklahoma | from Denver (Note: No. 327: Denver → LA Rams (PD). Denver traded a twelfth-round selection (327th overall) to the LA Rams in exchange for TE Mike Barber.) |
| 12 | 328 | New York Jets | Sal Cesario | T | Cal Poly | |
| 12 | 329 | Miami Dolphins | Rickey Isom | RB | NC State | |
| 12 | 330 | Los Angeles Raiders | Larry Shepherd | WR | Houston | |
| 12 | 331 | Buffalo Bills | Derek Christian | LB | West Virginia | from Green Bay |
| 12 | 332 | New England Patriots | Don McAulay | K | Syracuse | |
| 12 | 333 | San Diego Chargers | Mike Travis | DB | Georgia Tech | from Chicago (Note: No. 333: Chicago → San Diego (PD). Chicago traded a twelfth-round selection (333rd overall) to San Diego in exchange for P Maury Buford.) |

== Supplemental draft ==
| Rnd. | Pick | Team | Player | Pos. | College | Notes |
|---|---|---|---|---|---|---|
| 7 | — | Philadelphia Eagles | Charles Crawford | RB | Oklahoma State | |

== Hall of Famers ==
- Charles Haley, linebacker from James Madison, taken 4th round 96th overall by San Francisco 49ers

Inducted: Professional Football Hall of Fame class of 2015.

== Notable undrafted players ==
| † | Pro Bowler |

| Original NFL team | Player | Pos. | College | Notes |
|---|---|---|---|---|
| Atlanta Falcons | Mike Busch | QB | South Dakota State | |
| Atlanta Falcons | Joe Caravello | TE | Tulane | |
| Atlanta Falcons | Jamie Dukes | C | Florida State | |
| Atlanta Falcons | Aubrey Matthews | WR | Delta State | |
| Atlanta Falcons | Ron Middleton | TE | Auburn | |
| Atlanta Falcons | Robert Moore | S | Northwestern State | |
| Atlanta Falcons | Buzz Sawyer | P | Baylor | |
| Atlanta Falcons | Rodney Tweet | WR | South Dakota | |
| Buffalo Bills | Steve Clark | DB | Liberty | |
| Buffalo Bills | Jason Staurovsky | K | Tulsa | |
| Buffalo Bills | Vince Villanucci | DT | Bowling Green State | |
| Buffalo Bills | John Wojciechowski | T | Michigan State | |
| Chicago Bears | Egypt Allen | S | TCU | |
| Chicago Bears | Mike Dwyer | DT | UMass | |
| Chicago Bears | Steve Jacobson | G | Abilene Christian | |
| Chicago Bears | Ed Zeman | S | Fort Lewis | |
| Cincinnati Bengals | Keith Cupp | T | Findlay | |
| Cleveland Browns | Reggie Carr | DE | Jackson State | |
| Cleveland Browns | Joe Costello | DE | Central Connecticut State | |
| Cleveland Browns | Stacey Driver | RB | Clemson | |
| Cleveland Browns | Mark Harper | CB | Alcorn State | |
| Cleveland Browns | Mike Siano | WR | Syracuse | |
| Dallas Cowboys | Pat Ballage | S | Notre Dame | |
| Dallas Cowboys | Tony Dollinger | RB | Evangel | |
| Dallas Cowboys | Ron Heller | TE | Oregon State | |
| Dallas Cowboys | Manny Hendrix | CB | Utah | |
| Dallas Cowboys | Stuart Rindy | T | Wisconsin–Whitewater | |
| Dallas Cowboys | Mark Royals | P | Appalachian State | |
| Dallas Cowboys | Lee Weigel | RB | Wisconsin–Eau Claire | |
| Dallas Cowboys | Scott Woolf | QB | Mount Union | |
| Denver Broncos | Mitch Andrews | TE | LSU | |
| Denver Broncos | Ken Bell | RB | Boston College | |
| Denver Broncos | Joe Dudek | RB | Plymouth State | |
| Denver Broncos | Mike Hold | QB | South Carolina | |
| Denver Broncos | Ken Karcher | QB | Tulane | |
| Denver Broncos | Eldridge Milton | LB | Clemson | |
| Denver Broncos | Jay Norvell | LB | Iowa | |
| Detroit Lions | Paul Butcher | LB | Wayne State | |
| Green Bay Packers | Willie Gillus | QB | Norfolk State | |
| Green Bay Packers | Freddie Parker | RB | Mississippi Valley State | |
| Green Bay Packers | Shawn Regent | C | Boston College | |
| Green Bay Packers | Miles Turpin | LB | California | |
| Houston Oilers | Eric Fairs | LB | Memphis | |
| Houston Oilers | Mark Gehring | TE | Eastern Washington | |
| Houston Oilers | Mike Knox | LB | Nebraska | |
| Indianapolis Colts | Brad Saar | LB | Ball State | |
| Indianapolis Colts | Geno Zimmerlink | TE | Virginia | |
| Kansas City Chiefs | Tim Cofield | DE | Elizabeth City State | |
| Kansas City Chiefs | Jack Epps | S | Kansas State | |
| Kansas City Chiefs | Richard Estell | WR | Kansas | |
| Kansas City Chiefs | Creig Federico | S | Illinois State | |
| Kansas City Chiefs | Don King | S | SMU | |
| Kansas City Chiefs | J. C. Pearson | S | Washington | |
| Kansas City Chiefs | Lavale Thomas | RB | Fresno State | |
| Kansas City Chiefs | Mark Walczak | TE | Arizona | |
| Los Angeles Rams | Elston Ridgle | DE | Nevada | |
| Los Angeles Rams | Alvin Wright | DT | Jacksonville State | |
| Miami Dolphins | Warren Loving | RB | William Penn | |
| Miami Dolphins | Tom O'Connor | P | South Carolina | |
| Miami Dolphins | Joe Stepanek | DT | Minnesota | |
| Minnesota Vikings | Neal Guggemos | KR | St. Thomas (MN) | |
| Minnesota Vikings | Ted Million | G | Duke | |
| New England Patriots | George Benyola | K | Louisiana Tech | |
| New England Patriots | Tony Brown | T | Pittsburgh | |
| New England Patriots | Wayne Coffey | WR | Texas State | |
| New England Patriots | Darrell Grymes | WR | Central State | |
| New England Patriots | Russell Hairston | WR | Kentucky | |
| New England Patriots | Lawrence Jackson | G | Presbyterian | |
| New England Patriots | Larry Linne | WR | UTEP | |
| New England Patriots | Gene Profit | CB | Yale | |
| New England Patriots | Jeff Wenzel | T | Tulane | |
| New Orleans Saints | Bill Bealles | T | Northern Iowa | |
| New Orleans Saints | Curtis Burrow | K | Central Arkansas | |
| New Orleans Saints | James Campen | C | Tulane | |
| New York Giants | Damian Johnson | G | Kansas State | |
| New York Jets | Don Baldwin | DE | Purdue | |
| New York Jets | Marty Horn | QB | Lehigh | |
| Pittsburgh Steelers | Brian Blankenship | G | Nebraska | |
| Pittsburgh Steelers | Gordon Brown | RB | Tulsa | |
| Pittsburgh Steelers | Gilvanni Johnson | WR | Michigan | |
| Pittsburgh Steelers | Chris Sheffield | CB | Albany State | |
| Pittsburgh Steelers | Steve Superick | P | West Virginia | |
| St. Louis Cardinals | Evan Arapostathis | P | Eastern Illinois | |
| St. Louis Cardinals | Tom Brown | WR | Augustana (SD) | |
| St. Louis Cardinals | Scott Holman | WR | Oregon | |
| St. Louis Cardinals | Broderick Sargent | RB | Baylor | |
| San Diego Chargers | James Hamrick | K | Rice | |
| San Diego Chargers | Greg Maahan | WR | Bowling Green | |
| San Francisco 49ers | Jerry Keeble | LB | Minnesota | |
| Seattle Seahawks | Veno Belk | TE | Michigan State | |
| Seattle Seahawks | Stan Eisenhooth | C | Towson | |
| Seattle Seahawks | Rory Graves | T | Ohio State | |
| Seattle Seahawks | Kevin Juma | WR | Idaho | |
| Seattle Seahawks | Keith Kartz | C | California | |
| Seattle Seahawks | Darryl Pollard | CB | Weber State | |
| Seattle Seahawks | Sean Salisbury | QB | USC | |
| Tampa Bay Buccaneers | Rick DiBernardo | LB | Notre Dame | |
| Tampa Bay Buccaneers | Barry Pettyjohn | T | Pittsburgh | |
| Tampa Bay Buccaneers | Nathan Wonsley | RB | Ole Miss | |
| Washington Redskins | Todd Bowles | S | Temple | |
| Washington Redskins | Anthony Copeland | LB | Louisville | |
| Washington Redskins | Todd Frain | TE | Nebraska | |
| Washington Redskins | Alec Gibson | DE | Illinois | |
| Washington Redskins | John Guzik | DT | Ohio | |
| Washington Redskins | Joe McHale | LB | Delaware | |
| Washington Redskins | James Noble | WR | Stephen F. Austin | |
| Washington Redskins | Anthony Sagnella | DT | Rutgers | |
| Washington Redskins | Ron Tilton | G | Tulane | |
| Washington Redskins | Robert Williams | WR | Baylor | |

== Trades ==
In the explanations below, (D) denotes trades that took place during the 1986 Draft, while (PD) indicates trades completed pre-draft.

Round 1

Round 2

Round 3

Round 4

Round 5

Round 6

Round 7

Round 8

Round 10

Round 11

Round 12

== Forfeited picks ==
Three selections in the 1986 draft were forfeited:
