= List of Youngstown State Penguins in the NFL draft =

This is a list of Youngstown State Penguins football players in the NFL draft.

== Key ==
B	Back	K	Kicker	NT	Nose tackle
C	Center	LB	Linebacker	FB	Fullback
DB	Defensive back	P	Punter	HB	Halfback
DE	Defensive end	QB	Quarterback	WR	Wide receiver
DT	Defensive tackle	RB	Running back	G	Guard
E	End	T	Offensive tackle	TE	Tight end

== Selections ==
Year	Round	Overall	Player	Team	Position	Notes
1943	19	180	Leo Mogus	Washington Redskins	E	
1946	16	143	Al Perl	Pittsburgh Steelers	B	
1948	11	86	Pete Lanzl	New York Giants	E	
1952	11	125	Ralph Goldston	Philadelphia Eagles	B	
1957	14	162	Joe Guido	Baltimore Colts	B	
1963	19	255	Frank Horvath	Minnesota Vikings	B	
1967	7	177	Bill House	Cleveland Browns	T	
1967	15	372	Jake Ferro	Miami Dolphins	LB	
1969	8	200	Craig Cotton	San Diego Chargers	WR	
1970	15	373	Dave Delsignore	San Francisco 49ers	WR	
1973	2	37	Ron Jaworski	Los Angeles Rams	QB	
1977	5	121	Cliff Stoudt	Pittsburgh Steelers	QB	
1979	7	191	Greg Fitzpatrick	Dallas Cowboys	LB	
1979	10	263	Ed McGlasson	New York Jets	C	
1979	12	329	Quentin Lowry	Dallas Cowboys	LB	
1984	5	136	John Goode	St. Louis Cardinals	TE	
1984	12	312	Paul McFadden	Philadelphia Eagles	K	
1986	6	142	Robert Thompson	New Orleans Saints	WR	
1989	7	176	Jim Zdelar	Miami Dolphins	T	
1992	9	236	Tony Tellington	Miami Dolphins	DB	
1998	4	118	Harry Deligianis	Jacksonville Jaguars	DE	
2017	3	83	Derek Rivers	New England Patriots	DE	
2017	5	167	Avery Moss	New York Giants	DE	
2022	6	193	Drew Ogletree	Indianapolis Colts	TE	
