= 1985 Northern Arizona Lumberjacks football team =

American college football season

1985 Northern Arizona Lumberjacks football
- Conference: Big Sky Conference
- Record: 3–8 (1–6 Big Sky)
- Head coach: Larry Kentera (1st season)
- Home stadium: Walkup Skydome

1985 Big Sky Conference football standings
	Conf.					Overall
Team	W		L		T	W		L		T
No. 5 Idaho $^	6	–	1	–	0	9	–	3	–	0
No. T–2 Nevada ^	6	–	1	–	0	11	–	2	–	0
Boise State	5	–	2	–	0	7	–	4	–	0
Weber State	4	–	3	–	0	6	–	5	–	0
Idaho State	3	–	4	–	0	5	–	6	–	0
Montana	2	–	5	–	0	3	–	8	–	0
Northern Arizona	1	–	6	–	0	3	–	8	–	0
Montana State	1	–	6	–	0	2	–	9	–	0
$ – Conference champion; ^ – NCAA Division I-AA playoff participant; Rankings from NCAA Division I-AA Poll

The 1985 Northern Arizona Lumberjacks football team represented Northern Arizona University as a member of the Big Sky Conference during the 1985 NCAA Division I-AA football season. Led by first-year head coach Larry Kentera, the Lumberjacks compiled an overall record of 3–8, with a mark of 1–6 in conference play, and finished tied for seventh in the Big Sky.

== Schedule ==
Date	Opponent	Site	Result	Attendance	Source
August 31	North Dakota*	Walkup Skydome; Flagstaff, AZ	W 41–0		
September 7	South Dakota State*	Walkup Skydome; Flagstaff, AZ	W 24–20		
September 21	Idaho	Walkup Skydome; Flagstaff, AZ	L 3–27	11,885	
September 28	at Eastern Washington*	Joe Albi Stadium; Spokane, WA	L 0–33	7,614	
October 5	at Idaho State	ASISU MiniDome; Pocatello, ID	L 3–34		
October 12	Montana State	Walkup Skydome; Flagstaff, AZ	W 27–24		
October 19	at Boise State	Bronco Stadium; Boise, ID	L 10–24	15,754	
October 26	No. 6 Nevada	Walkup Skydome; Flagstaff, AZ	L 10–36	9,200	
November 9	at Weber State	Wildcat Stadium; Ogden, UT	L 10–37		
November 16	Cal State Fullerton*	Walkup Skydome; Flagstaff, AZ	L 8–22	3,762	
November 23	Montana	Walkup Skydome; Flagstaff, AZ	L 31–32		
*Non-conference game; Rankings from NCAA Division I-AA Football Committee Poll released prior to the game
