= 1985 Montana Grizzlies football team =

American college football season

1985 Montana Grizzlies football
- Conference: Big Sky Conference
- Record: 3–8 (2–5 Big Sky)
- Head coach: Larry Donovan (6th season)
- Offensive coordinator: Joe Glenn (4th season)
- Defensive coordinator: Ken Flajole (1st season)
- Home stadium: Dornblaser Field

1985 Big Sky Conference football standings
	Conf.					Overall
Team	W		L		T	W		L		T
No. 5 Idaho $^	6	–	1	–	0	9	–	3	–	0
No. T–2 Nevada ^	6	–	1	–	0	11	–	2	–	0
Boise State	5	–	2	–	0	7	–	4	–	0
Weber State	4	–	3	–	0	6	–	5	–	0
Idaho State	3	–	4	–	0	5	–	6	–	0
Montana	2	–	5	–	0	3	–	8	–	0
Northern Arizona	1	–	6	–	0	3	–	8	–	0
Montana State	1	–	6	–	0	2	–	9	–	0
$ – Conference champion; ^ – NCAA Division I-AA playoff participant; Rankings from NCAA Division I-AA Poll

The 1985 Montana Grizzlies football team represented the University of Montana in the 1985 NCAA Division I-AA football season as a member of the Big Sky Conference (Big Sky). The Grizzlies were led by sixth-year head coach Larry Donovan, played their home games at Dornblaser Field in Missoula, and finished with three wins and eight losses (3–8, 2–5 Big Sky).

In the season finale at Northern Arizona, the Griz rallied to win by a point and snap a five-game losing streak. Two days later, Donovan and his staff were fired.

== Schedule ==
Date	Opponent	Site	Result	Attendance	Source
September 7	Cal State Fullerton*	Dornblaser Field; Missoula, MT	W 31–30	6,235	
September 21	at Minnesota*	Hubert H. Humphrey Metrodome; Minneapolis, MN	L 17–62	55,700	
September 28	Portland State*	Dornblaser Field; Missoula, MT	L 16–21	6,575	
October 5	No. 11 Nevada	Dornblaser Field; Missoula, MT	L 23–38	6,066	
October 12	Idaho State	Dornblaser Field; Missoula, MT	W 35–29		
October 19	at No. 4 Idaho	Kibbie Dome; Moscow, ID (rivalry)	L 0–38	11,300	
October 26	at Montana State	Reno H. Sales Stadium; Bozeman, MT (rivalry)	L 18–41	15,387	
November 2	Weber State	Dornblaser Field; Missoula, MT	L 29–57	4,159	
November 9	Boise State	Dornblaser Field; Missoula, MT	L 3–28	3,450	
November 16	at No. T–13 Eastern Washington*	Joe Albi Stadium; Spokane, WA (rivalry)	L 19–52	1,975	
November 23	at Northern Arizona	Walkup Skydome; Flagstaff, AZ	W 32–31		
*Non-conference game; Rankings from NCAA Division I-AA Football Committee Poll released prior to the game
