= Mike Dwyer (American football) =

American football player (born 1963)

No. 71
- Position: Defensive tackle

Personal information
- Born: June 13, 1963 (age 63); Boston, Massachusetts, U.S.
- Listed height: 6 ft 3 in (1.91 m)
- Listed weight: 280 lb (127 kg)

Career information
- High school: Barnstable (MA)
- College: UMass
- NFL draft: 1986: undrafted

Career history
- Chicago Bears (1986)*; Dallas Cowboys (1987); Green Bay Packers (1988)*; Phoenix Cardinals (1989)*
- * Offseason or practice squad member only

Awards and highlights
- All-Yankee Conference (1985); Division I-AA All-American (1985)

Career NFL statistics
- Sacks: 1
- Fumble recoveries: 2
- Stats at Pro Football Reference

Francis Michael Dwyer II (born June 13, 1963) is an American former professional football player who was a defensive tackle in the National Football League (NFL) for the Dallas Cowboys. He played college football for the UMass Minutemen.

== Early life ==
Dwyer attended Barnstable High School, where he played as a linebacker and offensive tackle. He enrolled in the University of Rhode Island, where he became a starter at defensive tackle.

After his sophomore season, he transferred to the University of Massachusetts. As a senior, he led the team with 12.5 sacks and 4 fumbles recoveries, while receiving Division I-AA All-American honors.

== Professional career ==
=== Chicago Bears ===
Dwyer was signed as an undrafted free agent by the Chicago Bears after the 1986 NFL draft. He was waived on August 18.

=== Dallas Cowboys ===
In 1987, he signed as a free agent with the Dallas Cowboys. He was released on September 1.

After the NFLPA strike was declared on the third week of the season, those contests were canceled (reducing the 16-game season to 15) and the NFL decided that the games would be played with replacement players. He was re-signed to be a part of the Dallas replacement team that was given the mock name "Rhinestone Cowboys" by the media. He started 3 games at left defensive tackle, playing alongside future Hall of Famer Randy White and keeping his starting position over defensive tackle Kevin Brooks, who crossed the picket line on October 7. He registered 8 tackles, one sack and one fumble recovery against the New York Jets. He was a popular player with the Cowboys fans during those games, because of his style of play and celebrations. He was cut on October 26, at the end of the strike.

=== Green Bay Packers ===
On July 24, 1988, he was signed by the Green Bay Packers as a free agent. He was cut before the start of the season.

=== Phoenix Cardinals ===
In 1989, he signed as a free agent with the Phoenix Cardinals. He was released on September 4.

== Personal life ==
After football, he was hired as the defensive line coach at Barnstable High School.
