= Chris Sheffield (American football) =

American football player (born 1963)

No. 41, 28
- Position: Cornerback

Personal information
- Born: January 9, 1963; Cairo, Georgia, U.S.
- Died: November 22, 2024 (aged 61); Thomasville, Georgia, U.S.
- Listed height: 6 ft 1 in (1.85 m)
- Listed weight: 193 lb (88 kg)

Career information
- High school: Cairo
- College: Albany State
- NFL draft: 1986: undrafted

Career history
- Pittsburgh Steelers (1986–1987); Detroit Lions (1987)

Career NFL statistics
- Interceptions: 1
- Stats at Pro Football Reference

Christopher Jonathan Sheffield (January 9, 1963 - November 22, 2024) was an American professional football player who was a cornerback for the Pittsburgh Steelers and the Detroit Lions of the National Football League (NFL). He played college football for the Albany State Golden Rams.

Sheffield died on November 22, 2024.
