= Vince Villanucci =

American football player (born 1964)

- Villanucci during his time at Bowling Green

No. 64
- Position: Nose tackle

Personal information
- Born: May 30, 1964; Lorain, Ohio, U.S.
- Died: April 9, 2023 (aged 58)
- Listed height: 6 ft 2 in (1.88 m)
- Listed weight: 265 lb (120 kg)

Career information
- High school: Lorain (OH)
- College: Bowling Green (1982–1985)
- NFL draft: 1986: undrafted

Career history
- Buffalo Bills (1986)*; Ottawa Rough Riders (1987)*; Green Bay Packers (1987)
- * Offseason or practice squad member only

Career NFL statistics
- Games played: 2
- Stats at Pro Football Reference

Vince Villanucci (May 30, 1964 – April 9, 2023) was an American professional football nose tackle who played one season in the National Football League (NFL) for the Green Bay Packers. He played college football for the Bowling Green Falcons and was also a member of the Buffalo Bills in the NFL and the Ottawa Rough Riders of the Canadian Football League (CFL). Following his playing career, he became a football and wrestling coach.

== Early life ==
Villanucci was born on May 30, 1964, in Lorain, Ohio. He began playing organized sports in fourth grade and continued his sports career at Lorain High School, where he competed in football and wrestling. In football, he was a guard, linebacker and placekicker. As a senior, he set a school record for longest field goal, and he was named second-team All-Ohio and first-team All-Buckeye Conference on both offense and defense. He was the only player to be named both All-Buckeye Conference on offense and defense, and was also chosen the conference's lineman of the year.

Villanucci also won the Golden Helmet award for best senior football player in Lorain County and the Lombardi award for best lineman in the county. Additionally, in wrestling, he placed third at the state championships as a senior. He signed to play college football for the Bowling Green Falcons.

== College career ==
Recruited to Bowling Green as a linebacker, Villanucci played both linebacker and on the defensive line for the Falcons from 1982 to 1985. He lettered all four years with the school, during which the team won two conference championships and made two bowl game appearances. During his senior year, he received Mid-American Conference (MAC) defensive player of the week honors and at the end, he was named second-team All-MAC at defensive lineman. The Falcons were undefeated in regular season play in Villanucci's senior season.

== Professional career ==
Villanucci signed with the Buffalo Bills as an undrafted free agent following the 1986 NFL draft. Although signed to play inside linebacker, he later became a nose tackle. He was released by the Bills in August 1986. After being released by the Bills, Villanucci signed with the Ottawa Rough Riders of the Canadian Football League (CFL) for the 1987 season; although he impressed early, he was released on May 26, 1987, as the team already had extensive depth at the defensive line position. He later joined the team's suspended list, remaining there until being released on September 23.

In September 1987, the NFL Players Association went on strike and teams assembled rosters of replacement players; Villanucci was signed as a replacement by the Green Bay Packers the day he was released from the CFL, being signed to play nose tackle. He debuted for the team in Week 4 against the Minnesota Vikings and later appeared in Week 5 against the Detroit Lions, both as a backup. He was released on October 19, at the end of the strike. Although he was only with the Packers for a month, he said it had an impact on his life and led him to become a coach. Recalling playing for the team under coach Forrest Gregg, he said "It was one of the best experiences of my life. [Gregg] was one of the best motivators I've ever seen. He would say, 'Let's go men!' and everyone's hair stood up. It was a biblical experience. He was a big reason why I became a coach."

== Coaching career ==
Villanucci began his coaching career with Villa Angela-St. Joseph High School in Cleveland, Ohio, where he was both a football and wrestling coach. Afterwards, he became the defensive line coach with the New Mexico Highlands Cowboys in 1993. While coaching there, he studied at New Mexico Highlands University and received a master's degree in sports medicine. He was promoted to defensive coordinator in 1995. In 1999, he was hired as head football coach at Baboquivari High School and led a major turnaround of a struggling program. They had previously been considered the state's "most losingest program," having even gone full seasons without scoring a point, but Villanucci led them to their first winning season ever in his first year. The following year, he helped them reach the state playoffs.

Villanucci became the wrestling coach and assistant football coach at Nogales High School for the 2001–02 season. He later added the duty of track coach. At Nogales, he developed several state champion wrestlers and later became head football coach in 2007 after the departure of the previous person in the position. He served as Nogales football coach from 2007 to 2013 and led them to five state playoff appearances and five winning seasons, being named the Division III coach of the year and the Arizona Coach of the Year runner-up after leading them to their first state semifinals appearance in 2012. After ending his coaching career, he remained at the school as a physical education teacher until 2019.

== Personal life and death ==
In 1990, Villanucci helped save the life of a man trapped in a burning vehicle. In addition to being a coach during the 1990s, he also took up powerlifting and ranked in the top 10 in the world, having a personal best lift of 865 pounds (392 kg).

Villanucci returned to Lorain, Ohio, after retiring from Nogales. He was inducted into the Lorain Sports Hall of Fame in 2021. He battled chronic traumatic encephalopathy (CTE) in his later years and died from the disease on April 9, 2023.
