= Bill Callahan (defensive back) =

American football player (born 1964)

No. 25
- Position: Defensive back

Personal information
- Born: April 11, 1964 (age 62); Natrona Heights, Pennsylvania, U.S.
- Listed height: 6 ft 0 in (1.83 m)
- Listed weight: 200 lb (91 kg)

Career information
- High school: Valley
- College: Pittsburgh
- NFL draft: 1986: 4th round, 94th overall pick

Career history
- Pittsburgh Steelers (1986)*; Seattle Seahawks (1987)*; Buffalo Bills (1987)
- * Offseason or practice squad member only
- Stats at Pro Football Reference

William Timothy Callahan (born April 11, 1964) is an American former professional football player who was a defensive back for the Buffalo Bills of the National Football League (NFL). He played college football for the Pittsburgh Panthers while at the University of Pittsburgh.

Callahan switched from a running back to his best known position as a defensive back in 1983, after a suggestion from his coach Joe Naunchik, although many did not initially understand his choice to change position. Callahan became the starting favourite in that position after his predecessor Ray Weatherspoon was dropped following an altercation.

In 1986, he was favourably compared to Tom Flynn and was described by The Pittsburgh Press as being "one of the brightest young safeties in the NFL". He was recorded as running the 40 yards (37 m)-dash in 4.48 seconds, making him among the fastest safeties playing at that time. His time was comparable to then top-rated safety Craig Swoope, who did the same run in 4.57 seconds.
