= 1985 Montana State Bobcats football team =

American college football season

1985 Montana State Bobcats football
- Conference: Big Sky Conference
- Record: 2–9 (1–6 Big Sky)
- Head coach: Dave Arnold (3rd season)
- Home stadium: Sales Stadium

1985 Big Sky Conference football standings
	Conf.					Overall
Team	W		L		T	W		L		T
No. 5 Idaho $^	6	–	1	–	0	9	–	3	–	0
No. T–2 Nevada ^	6	–	1	–	0	11	–	2	–	0
Boise State	5	–	2	–	0	7	–	4	–	0
Weber State	4	–	3	–	0	6	–	5	–	0
Idaho State	3	–	4	–	0	5	–	6	–	0
Montana	2	–	5	–	0	3	–	8	–	0
Northern Arizona	1	–	6	–	0	3	–	8	–	0
Montana State	1	–	6	–	0	2	–	9	–	0
$ – Conference champion; ^ – NCAA Division I-AA playoff participant; Rankings from NCAA Division I-AA Poll

The 1985 Montana State Bobcats football team was an American football team that represented Montana State University in the Big Sky Conference during the 1985 NCAA Division I-AA football season. In their third season under head coach Dave Arnold, the Bobcats compiled a 2–9 record (1–6 against Big Sky opponents) and finished last in the Big Sky.

== Schedule ==
Date	Opponent	Site	Result	Attendance	Source
September 7	at Portland State*	Civic Stadium; Portland, OR	L 28–46	7,163	
September 14	Eastern Oregon*	Sales Stadium; Bozeman, MT	W 86–0		
September 21	Eastern Washington*	Sales Stadium; Bozeman, MT	L 23–28	11,293	
September 28	at Boise State	Bronco Stadium; Boise, ID	L 21–58	17,488	
October 5	Weber State^{†}	Sales Stadium; Bozeman, MT	L 36–50	12,597	
October 12	at Northern Arizona	Walkup Skydome; Flagstaff, AZ	L 24–27		
October 19	at Idaho State	ASISU Minidome; Pocatello, ID	L 9–50		
October 26	Montana	Sales Stadium; Bozeman, MT (rivalry)	W 41–18	15,387	
November 2	at No. 3 Nevada	Mackay Stadium; Reno, NV	L 14–61	9,125	
November 9	No. 6 Idaho	Sales Stadium; Bozeman, MT	L 0–34	15,000	
November 16	at Washington State*	Martin Stadium; Pullman, WA	L 14–64	6,807	
*Non-conference game; ^{†}Homecoming; Rankings from NCAA Division I-AA Football Committee Poll released prior to the game
