= 1985 Nevada Wolf Pack football team =

American college football season

1985 Nevada Wolf Pack football

NCAA Division I-AA Quarterfinal, L 12–35 vs. Furman
- Conference: Big Sky Conference
- Record: 11–2 (6–1 Big Sky)
- Head coach: Chris Ault (10th season)
- Defensive coordinator: Bill Miller (3rd season)
- Home stadium: Mackay Stadium

1985 Big Sky Conference football standings
| | Conf. | | | | | Overall |
| Team | W | | L | | T | W | | L | | T |
|---|---|---|---|---|---|---|---|---|---|---|
| No. 5 Idaho $^ | 6 | – | 1 | – | 0 | 9 | – | 3 | – | 0 |
| No. T–2 Nevada ^ | 6 | – | 1 | – | 0 | 11 | – | 2 | – | 0 |
| Boise State | 5 | – | 2 | – | 0 | 7 | – | 4 | – | 0 |
| Weber State | 4 | – | 3 | – | 0 | 6 | – | 5 | – | 0 |
| Idaho State | 3 | – | 4 | – | 0 | 5 | – | 6 | – | 0 |
| Montana | 2 | – | 5 | – | 0 | 3 | – | 8 | – | 0 |
| Northern Arizona | 1 | – | 6 | – | 0 | 3 | – | 8 | – | 0 |
| Montana State | 1 | – | 6 | – | 0 | 2 | – | 9 | – | 0 |
$ – Conference champion; ^ – NCAA Division I-AA playoff participant; Rankings from NCAA Division I-AA Poll

The 1985 Nevada Wolf Pack football team represented the University of Nevada, Reno during the 1985 NCAA Division I-AA football season. Nevada competed as a member of the Big Sky Conference (BSC). The Wolf Pack were led by tenth-year head coach Chris Ault and played their home games at Mackay Stadium.

== Schedule ==
| Date | Opponent | Rank | Site | Result | Attendance | Source |
|---|---|---|---|---|---|---|
| September 7 | Cal State Northridge* | | Mackay Stadium; Reno, NV | W 56–12 | 9,481 | |
| September 14 | at Cal State Fullerton* | | Santa Ana Stadium; Santa Ana, CA | W 30–3 | 6,317 | |
| September 21 | Boise State | | Mackay Stadium; Reno, NV (rivalry) | W 37–10 | 13,460 | |
| September 28 | at No. 10 Idaho | No. 2 | Kibbie Dome; Moscow, ID | L 21–25 | 15,600 | |
| October 5 | at Montana | No. 11 | Dornblaser Field; Missoula, MT | W 38–23 | 6,066 | |
| October 12 | No. 10 Eastern Washington* | No. 11 | Mackay Stadium; Reno, NV | W 31–25 | 9,650 | |
| October 19 | Weber State^{†} | No. 7 | Mackay Stadium; Reno, NV | W 47–12 | 12,430 | |
| October 26 | at Northern Arizona | No. 6 | Walkup Skydome; Flagstaff, AZ | W 36–10 | 9,200 | |
| November 2 | Montana State | No. 3 | Mackay Stadium; Reno, NV | W 61–14 | 9,125 | |
| November 9 | Idaho State | No. 3 | Mackay Stadium; Reno, NV | W 42–14 | 8,932 | |
| November 16 | UNLV* | No. 3 | Mackay Stadium; Reno, NV (rivalry) | W 48–7 | 13,417 | |
| December 7 | No. 6 Arkansas State* | No. T–2 | Mackay Stadium; Reno, NV (NCAA Division I-AA First Round) | W 24–23 | 10,241 | |
| December 14 | at No. T–2 Furman* | No. T–2 | Paladin Stadium; Greenville, SC (NCAA Division I-AA Quarterfinal) | L 12–35 | 10,461 | |
*Non-conference game; ^{†}Homecoming; Rankings from NCAA Division I-AA Football Committee Poll released prior to the game

== Roster ==
1985 Nevada Wolf Pack football team roster
Players
Coaches
Offense

| Pos. | # | Name | Class |

Defense

| Pos. | # | Name | Class |
|---|---|---|---|
| CB | 13 | Patrick Hunter | Sr |
| CB | 25 | Joe Peterson | Jr |
| DE | 90 | Elston Ridgle | Sr |
| LB | 43 | Henry Rolling | Jr |

Special teams

| Pos. | # | Name | Class |
|---|---|---|---|
| PK | 7 | Marty Zendejas | So |

Head coach

- Chris Ault

Coordinators/assistant coaches

Legend

- (C) Team captain
- (S) Suspended
- (I) Ineligible
- Injured
- Redshirt

== NFL draft ==
Cornerback Patrick Hunter was selected in the third round of the 1986 NFL draft (68th overall) by the Seattle Seahawks.
