= Jerry Keeble =

American football player (born 1963)

No. 98
- Position: Linebacker

Personal information
- Born: August 19, 1963 (age 63); St. Louis, Missouri, U.S.
- Listed height: 6 ft 3 in (1.91 m)
- Listed weight: 230 lb (104 kg)

Career information
- High school: Hazlewood East (MO)
- College: Minnesota
- NFL draft: 1986: undrafted

Career history
- San Francisco 49ers (1986–1987)

Career NFL statistics
- Games played: 3
- Stats at Pro Football Reference

Jerry Anthony Keeble (born August 19, 1963) is an American former professional football player who was a linebacker for one season with the San Francisco 49ers of the National Football League (NFL). He played college football for the Minnesota Golden Gophers.
