= Gilvanni Johnson =

American football player (born 1963)

No. 87
- Position: Wide receiver

Personal information
- Born: September 12, 1963 (age 63); Birmingham, Alabama, U.S.
- Listed height: 6 ft 1 in (1.85 m)
- Listed weight: 195 lb (88 kg)

Career information
- High school: Northern High School (Detroit, Michigan)
- College: Michigan
- NFL draft: 1986: undrafted

Career history
- Pittsburgh Steelers (1986)*; Detroit Lions (1987)
- * Offseason or practice squad member only

Career NFL statistics
- Games played: 3
- Stats at Pro Football Reference

Gilvanni Martinni Johnson (born September 12, 1963) is an American former professional football player who was a wide receiver for the Detroit Lions of the National Football League (NFL). He played college football for the Michigan Wolverines.

== Football career ==
In his college career Johnson hauled in six receptions for 96 yards. Johnson was also a stellar punt returner, returning 33 punts for 304 yards and a touchdown. In Johnson's NFL career he played in three games during the 1987 season with the Detroit Lions.
