= Jeff Wenzel =

American football player (born 1963)

No. 72
- Position: Tackle

Personal information
- Born: October 21, 1963 (age 63); New Orleans, Louisiana
- Listed height: 6 ft 7 in (2.01 m)
- Listed weight: 270 lb (122 kg)

Career information
- High school: Metairie (LA)
- College: Tulane
- NFL draft: 1986: undrafted

Career history
- New England Patriots (1986)*; New Orleans Saints (1987); Philadelphia Eagles (1987)
- * Offseason or practice squad member only

Career NFL statistics
- Games played: 3
- Stats at Pro Football Reference

Jeffrey Gustave Wenzel (born October 21, 1963) is an American former professional football player who was a tackle for the Philadelphia Eagles of the National Football League (NFL). He played college football for the Tulane Green Wave.
