= Carl Carter =

American football player (1964–2019)

No. 41, 45, 44, 21
- Position: Cornerback

Personal information
- Born: March 7, 1964; Fort Worth, Texas, U.S.
- Died: May 15, 2019 (aged 55); Fort Worth, Texas, U.S.
- Listed height: 5 ft 11 in (1.80 m)
- Listed weight: 189 lb (86 kg)

Career information
- High school: O. D. Wyatt (Fort Worth)
- College: Texas Tech
- NFL draft: 1986: 4th round, 89th overall pick

Career history
- St. Louis/Phoenix Cardinals (1986–1989); Cincinnati Bengals (1990–1991); Tampa Bay Buccaneers (1991); Green Bay Packers (1992)

Career NFL statistics
- Interceptions: 8
- Fumble recoveries: 5
- Sacks: 1
- Stats at Pro Football Reference

Carl Anthony Carter Sr. (March 7, 1964 – May 15, 2019) was a cornerback in the National Football League (NFL). He played for the St. Louis/Phoenix Cardinals, Cincinnati Bengals, Tampa Bay Buccaneers, and Green Bay Packers. He was selected by the Cardinals in the fourth round of the 1986 NFL draft. Collegiately, he played for the Texas Tech Red Raiders.

Carter also competed for the Texas Tech Red Raiders track and field team as a sprinter.

Carter died on May 15, 2019, in his hometown of Fort Worth, TX.
