= Joe Stepanek =

American football player (born 1963)

No. 73
- Position: Defensive tackle

Personal information
- Born: November 6, 1963 (age 63); Tama, Iowa, U.S.
- Listed height: 6 ft 5 in (1.96 m)
- Listed weight: 268 lb (122 kg)

Career information
- High school: Regis (Cedar Rapids, Iowa)
- College: Minnesota
- NFL draft: 1986: undrafted

Career history
- Miami Dolphins (1986)*; Saskatchewan Roughriders (1987)*; Atlanta Falcons (1987)*; Minnesota Vikings (1987); New York Jets (1988)*
- * Offseason or practice squad member only

Career NFL statistics
- Safeties: 1
- Stats at Pro Football Reference

Joseph Paul Stepanek (born November 6, 1963) is an American former professional football player who was a defensive tackle in the National Football League (NFL). He played college football for the Waldorf Warriors in Iowa before transferring to play for the Minnesota Golden Gophers in 1984. He played for the Warriors from 1982 to 1983 and for the Golden Gophers from 1984 to 1985, lettering both years with the latter.

Stepanek began his professional career in 1986 by joining the NFL's Miami Dolphins but did not make the team. In the 1987 off-season, he had stints in the Canadian Football League (CFL) with the Saskatchewan Roughriders and in the NFL with the Atlanta Falcons. When the NFL Players Association went on strike, Stepanek was signed by the Minnesota Vikings as a replacement player. He played only one game for the Vikings, starting against the Green Bay Packers at defensive tackle, and recorded a safety; he finished tied for the league lead in that category even though he played only one of 15 possible games. He was released by the team after the strike and later had a short stay with the New York Jets, but never played professionally again.
