= John Armstrong (American football) =

American football player (born 1963)

No. 20
- Position: Defensive back

Personal information
- Born: July 7, 1963 (age 63); Calhoun City, Mississippi, U.S.
- Listed height: 5 ft 9 in (1.75 m)
- Listed weight: 190 lb (86 kg)

Career information
- College: Richmond
- NFL draft: 1986: 11th round, 286th overall pick

Career history
- Minnesota Vikings (1986)*; Buffalo Bills (1987); Atlanta Falcons (1988)*
- * Offseason or practice squad member only

Career NFL statistics
- Sacks: 2
- Stats at Pro Football Reference

John Earl Armstrong (born July 7, 1963) is an American former professional football player who was a defensive back with the Buffalo Bills of the National Football League (NFL) in 1987.

Armstrong played multiple positions for the Bruce High School football team, as well as basketball and track and field, before going on to Northwest Mississippi Community College. There he earned junior college All-American status as the team won a national junior college championship.

After two years, he joined the football team of the University of Richmond, where he majored in physical education. He became a starting cornerback during his senior year in 1985 and ranked among the top punt and kickoff returners in the country.

In the 1986 NFL draft, Armstrong was drafted by the Minnesota Vikings in the 11th round. He was released from the team on August 19. Armstrong signed with the Buffalo Bills in 1987 and played with the team in the preseason, but was placed on waivers on August 31.

He rejoined the team as a non-roster replacement player during the 1987 National Football League Players Association strike. On September 23, he was interrogated and harassed at a hotel by striking Bills players, including Greg Bell, Joe Devlin, Sean McNanie and Fred Smerlas, for playing as a strikebreaker. He appeared in three games for Buffalo, starting two. He signed with the Atlanta Falcons in 1988, but was cut in August before the season began.
