= Gene Profit =

American football player (born 1964)

No. 22
- Position: Cornerback

Personal information
- Born: November 11, 1964 (age 61); Baton Rouge, Louisiana, U.S.
- Listed height: 5 ft 10 in (1.78 m)
- Listed weight: 168 lb (76 kg)

Career information
- High school: Junipero Serra
- College: Yale
- NFL draft: 1986: undrafted

Career history
- New England Patriots (1986–1988); Washington Redskins (1989)*
- * Offseason or practice squad member only
- Stats at Pro Football Reference

Gene Profit (born November 11, 1964) is an American former professional football player who was a cornerback for three seasons with the New England Patriots of the National Football League (NFL). He played college football for the Yale Bulldogs.
