= Mason Williams (baseball) =

American baseball player (born 1991)

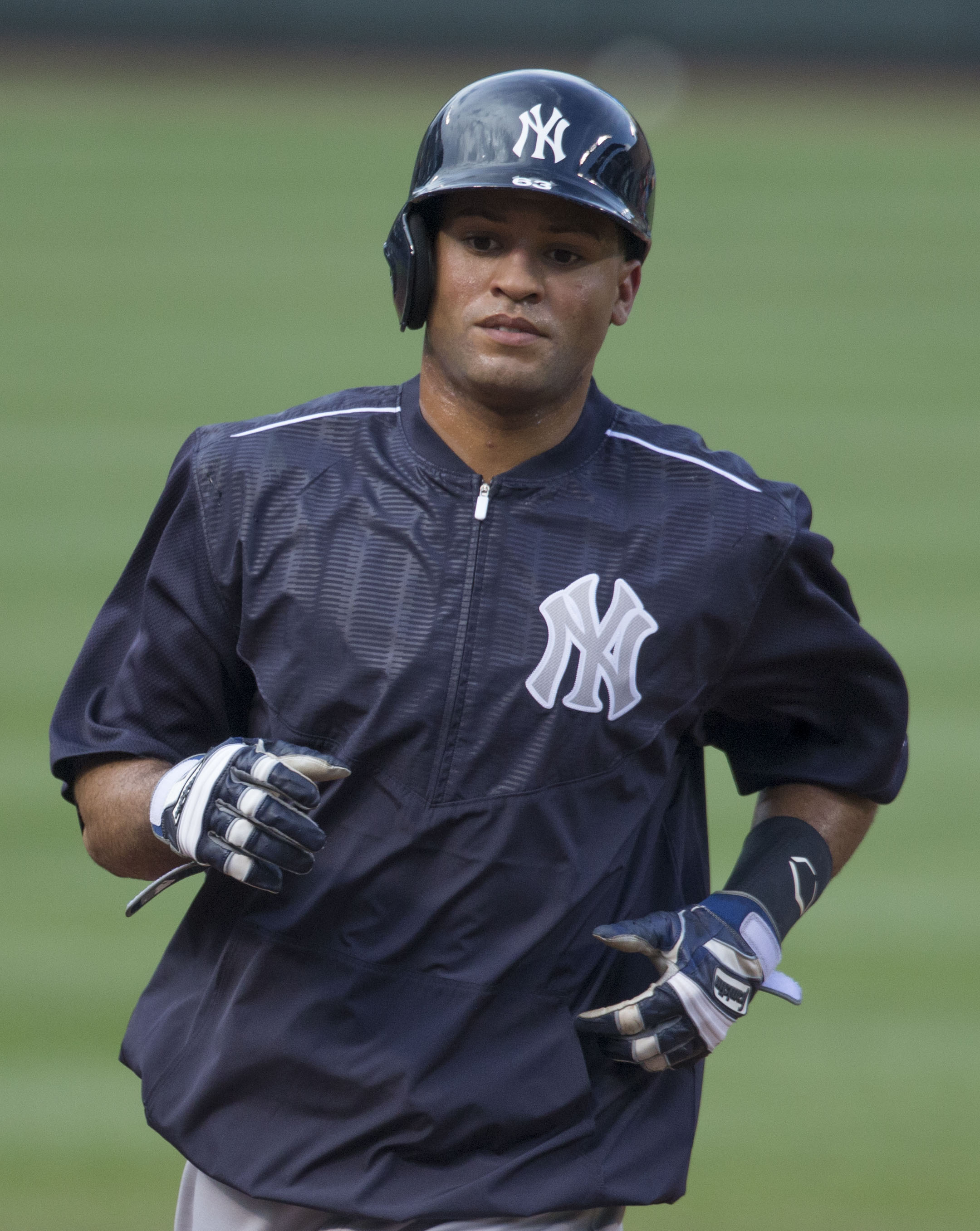
- Williams with the New York Yankees
- Outfielder
- Born: August 21, 1991 (age 35); Pawtucket, Rhode Island, U.S.
- Batted: Left Threw: Right

MLB debut
- June 12, 2015, for the New York Yankees

Last MLB appearance
- June 19, 2021, for the New York Mets

MLB statistics
- Batting average: .265
- Home runs: 4
- Runs batted in: 15
- Stats at Baseball Reference

Teams
- New York Yankees (2015–2017); Cincinnati Reds (2018); Baltimore Orioles (2019–2020); New York Mets (2021)

Mason Jordan Williams (born August 21, 1991) is an American former professional baseball outfielder. He played in Major League Baseball (MLB) for the New York Yankees, Cincinnati Reds, Baltimore Orioles, and New York Mets.

== Early life ==
Williams was born in Pawtucket, Rhode Island. He excelled for the local Little League team. After Mason completed the seventh grade at St. Teresa School, his family moved to Winter Garden, Florida, where he could compete against a higher level of competition with the hopes of receiving a college baseball scholarship.

== Career ==
=== New York Yankees ===
Williams attended West Orange High School in Winter Garden, Florida, and played for the school's baseball team. The New York Yankees selected Williams in the fourth round of the 2010 Major League Baseball draft. He signed for a $1.5 million signing bonus to forgo his scholarship to the University of South Carolina.

Williams started his career with the Gulf Coast Yankees of the Rookie-level Gulf Coast League in 2010. He appeared in five games, hitting .222/.263/.222 in 18 at bats. He spent the 2011 season playing for the Staten Island Yankees of the Low–A New York–Penn League, where he hit .349/.395/.468 with three home runs, 31 runs batted in and 28 stolen bases in 68 games. After the season, he was named the New York–Penn League's Most Valuable Player.

Prior to the 2012 season, Baseball America considered him the Yankees fifth best prospect for the 2012 season. They also ranked him first among prospects in the New York–Penn League. Keith Law ranked Williams as the 34th-best overall prospect in baseball while MLB.com ranked him as the 73rd-best. Williams began the year with the Charleston RiverDogs of the Single–A South Atlantic League, where he hit .304/.359/.489 with eight home runs and 19 stolen bases in 69 games before earning a promotion to the Tampa Yankees of the High–A Florida State League. With Tampa, he hit .277/.302/.422 with three home runs in 22 games before dislocating his left shoulder on July 25. On November 20, 2014, the Yankees added Williams to their 40-man roster to protect him from the Rule 5 draft.

After starting 2015 with the Trenton Thunder of the Double-A Eastern League, the Yankees promoted Williams to the Scranton/Wilkes-Barre RailRiders of the Triple-A International League on May 20. The Yankees promoted Williams to the major leagues on June 11. In his major league debut on June 12, Williams hit a home run in his second at-bat, which was his first Major League hit. Williams separated his right shoulder in a game on a June 19 and went on the disabled list. He had season-ending shoulder surgery on August 7.

Williams played for Scranton/Wilkes-Barre in 2016, and was a September call-up for the Yankees. He batted .296 in 12 games with the Yankees in September 2016. Williams began the 2017 season with Scranton/Wilkes-Barre and was promoted to the major leagues on June 16. He started in five games for the Yankees, before he was designated for assignment on June 29. Williams elected free agency following the season on November 6.

=== Cincinnati Reds ===
On November 17, 2017, Williams signed a minor league contract with the Cincinnati Reds. On July 26, 2018, he had his contract selected by the Reds and made his Reds debut in a game against the Philadelphia Phillies as a pinch hitter in the bottom of the 9th. The following day, Williams made his first start for the Reds, and in the 4th inning, he hit a 3-run home run to give Cincinnati a 5–2 lead. He elected free agency on November 3.

On December 19, 2018, Williams re-signed with the Reds on a minor league deal. He was released on March 19, 2019.

=== Baltimore Orioles ===
On March 29, 2019, Williams signed a minor league deal with the Baltimore Orioles. He played for the Norfolk Tides of the International League. After Norfolk's season ended, the Orioles promoted Williams to the major leagues on September 3. He appeared in 11 games, hitting .267 with 2 runs batted in. Williams was outrighted off the Orioles roster on October 31 and elected free agency.

Williams re-signed with Baltimore on a minor league contract on November 26, 2019. On August 22, 2020, Williams was selected to the active roster. Williams was designated for assignment by the Orioles on September 1. He was selected back to the major league roster on September 5. Williams was again designated for assignment by the Orioles on September 11. Williams was released by the Orioles on September 20.

=== New York Mets ===
On April 15, 2021, Williams signed a minor league contract with the New York Mets organization. On May 31, Williams was selected to the active roster. In 17 games for the Mets, he hit .212/.297/.333 with one home run and one RBI before he was designated for assignment on June 20. He was outrighted to the Triple-A Syracuse Mets on June 24, and elected free agency the same day. On June 25, Williams re-signed with the Mets on a new minor league contract. In 2021, he had the slowest sprint speed of all major league center fielders, at 26.7 feet/second. In 70 total appearances for Syracuse, Williams slashed .281/.336/.414 with five home runs, 29 RBI, and seven stolen bases. He elected free agency following the season on November 7.

== Personal life ==
Williams's father, Derwin Williams, played in the National Football League for the New England Patriots. His grandfather's brother, Walt Williams, played Major League Baseball from 1964 through 1975 as an outfielder with the Houston Colt .45s, Chicago White Sox, Cleveland Indians, and New York Yankees. Williams has a younger brother, Kobe.

Williams was arrested for driving under the influence of alcohol in April 2013.
