= 1985 Idaho Vandals football team =

American college football season

1985 Idaho Vandals football

Big Sky champion

NCAA Division I-AA First Round, L 38–42 vs. Eastern Washington
- Conference: Big Sky Conference

Ranking
- AP: No. 5
- Record: 9–3 (6–1 Big Sky)
- Head coach: Dennis Erickson (4th season)
- Offensive coordinator: Keith Gilbertson (2nd season)
- Defensive coordinator: John L. Smith (4th season)
- Base defense: 3–4
- Home stadium: Kibbie Dome

1985 Big Sky Conference football standings
	Conf.					Overall
Team	W		L		T	W		L		T
No. 5 Idaho $^	6	–	1	–	0	9	–	3	–	0
No. T–2 Nevada ^	6	–	1	–	0	11	–	2	–	0
Boise State	5	–	2	–	0	7	–	4	–	0
Weber State	4	–	3	–	0	6	–	5	–	0
Idaho State	3	–	4	–	0	5	–	6	–	0
Montana	2	–	5	–	0	3	–	8	–	0
Northern Arizona	1	–	6	–	0	3	–	8	–	0
Montana State	1	–	6	–	0	2	–	9	–	0
$ – Conference champion; ^ – NCAA Division I-AA playoff participant; Rankings from NCAA Division I-AA Poll

The 1985 Idaho Vandals football team represented the University of Idaho in the 1985 NCAA Division I-AA football season. The Vandals, led by fourth-year head coach Dennis Erickson, were members of the Big Sky Conference and played their home games at the Kibbie Dome, an indoor facility on campus in Moscow, Idaho.

The Vandals won their first outright conference title since 1971 (the 1982 team tied for the title, but lost the head-to-head tiebreaker to Montana). Led by quarterbacks Scott Linehan and Rick Sloan, Idaho finished the regular season at 9–2 and 6–1 in the Big Sky.

The 1985 season marked the first time that the Vandal football program had four consecutive winning seasons; this streak extended to fifteen in 1996.

== Notable games ==
The Vandals opened the season with a fifteen-point loss at Oregon State in Corvallis, whom they had defeated the year before in Moscow. After six straight losses to Nevada, Idaho recorded its first conference victory over the Wolf Pack, who joined the Big Sky in 1979. The Vandals defeated rival Boise State for the fourth consecutive year, the fourth of twelve straight over the Broncos, and were ranked fifth in the final I-AA poll, released prior to the postseason. A key one-point road loss at Idaho State in late October prevented the Vandals from attaining an important first round bye in the I-AA playoffs.

== Division I-AA playoffs ==
After a two-season absence, Idaho returned to the twelve-team I-AA playoffs, hosting independent Eastern Washington, whom they had defeated four weeks earlier by three touchdowns. The eleventh-ranked Eagles won the rematch, a back-and-forth contest before a sparse crowd at the Kibbie Dome, two days after Thanksgiving. (EWU joined the Big Sky in 1987, raising league membership to nine.)

For the following season in 1986, the I-AA playoffs expanded from 12 to 16 teams, which eliminated the bye week for the top four seeds.

== Notable players ==
The 1985 team included two future NFL head coaches: quarterback Scott Linehan and offensive lineman Tom Cable. Future NFL players with lengthy pro careers included guard Mark Schlereth (redshirt freshman starting on defense this season) and true freshman John Friesz, a future collegiate hall of fame quarterback as a three-year starter (1987–89), but inactive in 1985 as a redshirt.

== Coaches ==
This was the fourth and final season at Idaho for head coach Dennis Erickson and defensive coordinator John L. Smith. Offensive coordinator Keith Gilbertson returned to that position on a volunteer basis after three spring seasons in the USFL with the L.A. Express. Days after Erickson's early December departure for Wyoming, Gilbertson was promoted to head coach for 1986. Smith followed Erickson to Laramie and back to the Palouse at Washington State in 1987, then returned to the Vandals in January 1989. He succeeded Gilbertson, who left after three seasons for an assistant's position in Seattle, as offensive line coach under head coach Don James at Washington.

== Schedule ==
Date	Time	Opponent	Rank	Site	Result	Attendance	Source
September 7	6:00 pm	at Oregon State*		Parker Stadium; Corvallis, OR	L 28–43	26,154	
September 14	7:00 pm	Mankato State*		Kibbie Dome; Moscow, ID	W 46–7	9,500	
September 21	6:30 pm	at Northern Arizona		Walkup Skydome; Flagstaff, AZ	W 27–3	11,885	
September 28	1:00 pm	No. 2 Nevada^{†}	No. 10	Kibbie Dome; Moscow, ID	W 25–21	15,600	
October 5	6:00 pm	at Portland State*	No. 6	Civic Stadium; Portland, OR	W 51–17	6,286	
October 12	6:00 pm	at Weber State	No. 3	Wildcat Stadium; Ogden, UT	W 31–28	12,894	
October 19	7:00 pm	Montana	No. 4	Kibbie Dome; Moscow, ID (rivalry)	W 38–0	11,300	
October 26	6:30 pm	at Idaho State	No. 4	ASISU MiniDome; Pocatello, ID (rivalry)	L 37–38	11,422	
November 2	7:00 pm	No. 10 Eastern Washington*	No. 8	Kibbie Dome; Moscow, ID	W 42–21	15,500	
November 9	12:00 pm	at Montana State	No. 6	Reno H. Sales Stadium; Bozeman, MT	W 34–0	15,000	
November 23	1:00 pm	No. 19 Boise State	No. 5	Kibbie Dome; Moscow, ID (rivalry)	W 44–27	15,800	
November 30	3:00 pm	No. 11 Eastern Washington*	No. 5	Kibbie Dome; Moscow, ID (NCAA Division I-AA First Round)	L 38–42	6,500	
*Non-conference game; ^{†}Homecoming; Rankings from NCAA Division I-AA Football Committee Poll released prior to the game; All times are in Pacific time

== Roster ==
1985 Idaho Vandals football team roster
Players
Coaches
Offense

Pos.	#	Name	Class
WR	1	Eric Yarber	Sr
QB	10	Scott Linehan	Jr
TE	12	Scott Auker	Sr
QB	14	Rick Sloan	Sr
QB	15	Darel Tracy	Jr
QB	17	John Friesz	Fr
RB	19	Freddie Lloyd	Jr
RB		Todd Hoiness	Fr
RB		Greg Dial	Fr
RB		Kevin Bailey	Sr
WR	33	Brant Bengen	Jr
G		Tom Cable	Sr
G	64	Joe Smiley	Sr
C	68	Matt Watson	Sr
OT	75	Mark Caldwell	Sr
OT	77	Dave Thorsen	Sr

Defense

Pos.	#	Name	Class
CB		Ike Young	Jr
FS	16	Mark Tidd	Jr
CB	29	Virgil Paulson	So
SS		Dan McCanna	So
CB		Mike Johnston	Sr
LB	38	Tom Hennessey	Jr
LB		Nolan Harper	Jr
LB	45	Mike Cox	Jr
LB		Dave Parker	Jr
LB	35	Shawn Nilsson	Jr
NG	60	Mark Schlereth	Fr
DT		Joe Taibi	Sr
DT		John Andrews	Sr

Special teams

Pos.	#	Name	Class
K		Brian Decicio	Fr
P	7	Darin Magnuson	Jr
P		Johnn Pleas

Head coach

- Dennis Erickson (4th year)

Coordinators/assistant coaches

- Keith Gilbertson (OC)
- John L. Smith (DC)

Legend

- (C) Team captain
- (S) Suspended
- (I) Ineligible
- Injured
- Redshirt

== All-conference ==
Wide receiver Eric Yarber and junior linebacker Tom Hennessey were the offensive and defensive players of the year in the Big Sky, respectively, and were joined on the all-conference team by junior safety Mark Tidd (unanimous), senior tackle Mark Caldwell, and senior defensive tackle John Andrews.

Six Vandals, all on offense, were on the second team: quarterback Rick Sloan, tight end Scott Auker, wide receiver Brant Bengen, center Matt Watson, and guards Tom Cable and Joe Smiley. Honorable mention went to tackle Dave Thorsen and running back Todd Hoiness.

Yarber was named to the Kodak All-American team for Division I-AA.
