= Bob Thompson (American football) =

American football player (born 1962)

Robert L Thompson
No. 4
- Position: Wide receiver

Personal information
- Born: September 9, 1963 (age 63); Hollywood, Florida, U.S.
- Listed height: 5 ft 9 in (1.75 m)
- Listed weight: 180 lb (82 kg)

Career information
- High school: Cooper City
- College: Youngstown State
- NFL draft: 1986: 6th round, 142nd overall pick

Career history
- New Orleans Saints (1986); Denver Broncos (1987); Cincinnati Bengals (1988)*
- * Offseason or practice squad member only
- Stats at Pro Football Reference

Robert Lee Thompson Jr (born September 9, 1963) is an American former professional football player who was a wide receiver for the Denver Broncos of the National Football League (NFL). He played college football for the Youngstown State Penguins.
