= 1985 Idaho State Bengals football team =

American college football season

1985 Idaho State Bengals football
- Conference: Big Sky Conference
- Record: 5–6 (3–4 Big Sky)
- Head coach: Jim Koetter (3rd season)
- Offensive scheme: West Coast
- Defensive coordinator: Jim Moller (3rd season)
- Base defense: 4–3
- Home stadium: ASISU Minidome

1985 Big Sky Conference football standings
	Conf.					Overall
Team	W		L		T	W		L		T
No. 5 Idaho $^	6	–	1	–	0	9	–	3	–	0
No. T–2 Nevada ^	6	–	1	–	0	11	–	2	–	0
Boise State	5	–	2	–	0	7	–	4	–	0
Weber State	4	–	3	–	0	6	–	5	–	0
Idaho State	3	–	4	–	0	5	–	6	–	0
Montana	2	–	5	–	0	3	–	8	–	0
Northern Arizona	1	–	6	–	0	3	–	8	–	0
Montana State	1	–	6	–	0	2	–	9	–	0
$ – Conference champion; ^ – NCAA Division I-AA playoff participant; Rankings from NCAA Division I-AA Poll

The 1985 Idaho State Bengals football team represented Idaho State University as a member of the Big Sky Conference during the 1985 NCAA Division I-AA football season. Led by third-year head coach Jim Koetter, the Bengals compiled an overall record of 5–6, with a mark of 3–4 in conference play, and finished fifth in the Big Sky.

== Schedule ==
Date	Opponent	Site	Result	Attendance	Source
September 7	Northern Colorado*	ASISU MiniDome; Pocatello, ID	W 44–17		
September 14	at Portland State*	Civic Stadium; Portland, OR	W 23–10	3,431	
September 21	at Southwestern Louisiana*	Cajun Field; Lafayette, LA	L 30–31		
October 5	Northern Arizona	ASISU MiniDome; Pocatello, ID	W 34–3		
October 12	at Montana	Dornblaser Field; Missoula, MT	L 29–35		
October 19	Montana State	ASISU MiniDome; Pocatello, ID	W 50–9		
October 26	No. 4 Idaho	ASISU MiniDome; Pocatello, ID (rivalry)	W 38–37	11,422	
November 2	at Boise State	Bronco Stadium; Boise, ID	L 15–29	21,039	
November 9	at No. 3 Nevada	Mackay Stadium; Reno, NV	L 14–42	8,932	
November 16	at Weber State	Wildcat Stadium; Ogden, UT	L 45–46		
November 23	No. 11 Eastern Washington*	ASISU MiniDome; Pocatello, ID	L 21–42		
*Non-conference game; Rankings from NCAA Division I-AA Football Committee Poll released prior to the game
