= 1985 Boise State Broncos football team =

American college football season

1985 Boise State Broncos football
- Conference: Big Sky Conference
- Record: 7–4 (5–2 Big Sky)
- Head coach: Lyle Setencich (3rd season)
- Defensive coordinator: Phil Snow (3rd season)
- Home stadium: Bronco Stadium

1985 Big Sky Conference football standings
	Conf.					Overall
Team	W		L		T	W		L		T
No. 5 Idaho $^	6	–	1	–	0	9	–	3	–	0
No. T–2 Nevada ^	6	–	1	–	0	11	–	2	–	0
Boise State	5	–	2	–	0	7	–	4	–	0
Weber State	4	–	3	–	0	6	–	5	–	0
Idaho State	3	–	4	–	0	5	–	6	–	0
Montana	2	–	5	–	0	3	–	8	–	0
Northern Arizona	1	–	6	–	0	3	–	8	–	0
Montana State	1	–	6	–	0	2	–	9	–	0
$ – Conference champion; ^ – NCAA Division I-AA playoff participant; Rankings from NCAA Division I-AA Poll

The 1985 Boise State Broncos football team represented Boise State University as a member of Big Sky Conference during the 1985 NCAA Division I-AA football season. Led by third-year head coach Lyle Setencich, the Broncos compiled an overall record of 7–4 with a mark of 5–2 in conference play, placing third in the Big Sky. Boise State played home games on campus, at Bronco Stadium in Boise, Idaho.

== Schedule ==
Date	Time	Opponent	Rank	Site	Result	Attendance	Source
September 7	7:00 pm	at Utah*		Robert Rice Stadium; Salt Lake City, UT	L 17–20	25,382	
September 14	7:30 pm	UC Davis*		Bronco Stadium; Boise, ID	W 13–9	17,654	
September 21		at Nevada		Mackay Stadium; Reno, NV (rivalry)	L 10–37	13,460	
September 28	7:00 pm	Montana State		Bronco Stadium; Boise, ID	W 58–21	17,488	
October 5	7:00 pm	Long Beach State*		Bronco Stadium; Boise, ID	L 16–17	15,509	
October 19	7:00 pm	Northern Arizona		Bronco Stadium; Boise, ID	W 24–10	15,754	
October 26		at Weber State		Wildcat Stadium; Ogden, UT	W 24–21	8,506	
November 2	1:30 pm	Idaho State^{†}		Bronco Stadium; Boise, ID	W 29–15	21,039	
November 9	1:00 pm	at Montana		Dornblaser Field; Missoula, MT	W 28–3	3,450	
November 16	1:00 pm	Cal Poly*		Bronco Stadium; Boise, ID	W 42–14	12,212	
November 23	2:00 pm	at No. 5 Idaho	No. 20	Kibbie Dome; Moscow, ID (rivalry)	L 27–44	15,800	
*Non-conference game; ^{†}Homecoming; Rankings from NCAA Division I-AA Football Committee Poll released prior to the game; All times are in Mountain time

== Roster ==
1985 Boise State Broncos football team roster
Players
Coaches
Offense

Pos.	#	Name	Class
QB	1	Todd Anderson
RB	4	Jon Francis	Sr
QB	9	Bob Wheeler	Jr
QB	10	Hazsen Choates	Jr
WR	16	Tony Hunter	Sr
RB	35	Dale Goodwin	So
RB	38	Andy Regimbal	Sr
C	50	Dan Smith	Sr
G	61	Tom DeWitz	So
G	62	Steve Despot	Sr
OT	72	Barry Black	Jr
OT	76	Kim Hilliard	Fr
TE	82	Jon Cox	Jr
WR	85	Pat Fitzgerald	Sr

Defense

Pos.	#	Name	Class
CB	3	Robert Bloe	Jr
FS	7	Steve Harris	Sr
SS	15	Phil Bartle	Jr
CB	41	Kevin Edmundson	Jr
LB	44	Mike Dolby	Jr
LB	49	Rodney Starr	Jr
LB	58	Jim Ellis	Jr
DT	71	Pete Kwiatkowski	So
LB	91	Rex Walters	Jr
DT	92	Mike Johnson	Sr
DE	99	Mark Koch	Sr

Special teams

Pos.	#	Name	Class
K	2	Roberto Moran
P	20	Tom Schimmer	Jr

Head coach

- Lyle Setencich (2nd year)

Coordinators/assistant coaches

- Phil Snow (DC)

Legend

- (C) Team captain
- (S) Suspended
- (I) Ineligible
- Injured
- Redshirt
