= 1985 Weber State Wildcats football team =

American college football season

1985 Weber State Wildcats football
- Conference: Big Sky Conference
- Record: 6–5 (4–3 Big Sky)
- Head coach: Mike Price (5th season)
- Home stadium: Wildcat Stadium

1985 Big Sky Conference football standings
	Conf.					Overall
Team	W		L		T	W		L		T
No. 5 Idaho $^	6	–	1	–	0	9	–	3	–	0
No. T–2 Nevada ^	6	–	1	–	0	11	–	2	–	0
Boise State	5	–	2	–	0	7	–	4	–	0
Weber State	4	–	3	–	0	6	–	5	–	0
Idaho State	3	–	4	–	0	5	–	6	–	0
Montana	2	–	5	–	0	3	–	8	–	0
Northern Arizona	1	–	6	–	0	3	–	8	–	0
Montana State	1	–	6	–	0	2	–	9	–	0
$ – Conference champion; ^ – NCAA Division I-AA playoff participant; Rankings from NCAA Division I-AA Poll

The 1985 Weber State Wildcats football team represented Weber State College (now known as Weber State University) as a member of the Big Sky Conference during the 1985 NCAA Division I-AA football season. Led by fifth-year head coach Mike Price, the Wildcats compiled an overall record of 6–5, with a mark of 4–3 in conference play, and finished fourth in the Big Sky.

== Schedule ==
Date	Opponent	Site	Result	Attendance	Source
September 7	Southern Utah*	Wildcat Stadium; Ogden, UT	W 62–20	8,762	
September 14	Eastern Washington*	Wildcat Stadium; Ogden, UT	L 19–31		
September 21	Portland State*	Wildcat Stadium; Ogden, UT	W 45–24	6,492	
September 28	at Montana State	Sales Stadium; Bozeman, MT	W 50–36	12,597	
October 12	No. 3 Idaho	Wildcat Stadium; Ogden, UT	L 28–31	12,894	
October 19	at No. 7 Nevada	Mackay Stadium; Reno, NV	L 12–47	12,430	
October 26	Boise State	Wildcat Stadium; Ogden, UT	L 21–24	8,506	
November 2	at Montana	Dornblaser Field; Missoula, MT	W 57–29	4,159	
November 9	Northern Arizona	Wildcat Stadium; Ogden, UT	W 37–10		
November 16	Idaho State	Wildcat Stadium; Ogden, UT	W 46–45		
November 23	at Pacific (CA)*	Pacific Memorial Stadium; Stockton, CA	L 34–36		
*Non-conference game; Rankings from NCAA Division I-AA Football Committee Poll released prior to the game
