= 1985 Oregon State Beavers football team =

American college football season

1985 Oregon State Beavers football
- Conference: Pacific-10 Conference
- Record: 3–8 (2–6 Pac-10)
- Head coach: Dave Kragthorpe (1st season)
- Offensive coordinator: Garth Hall (1st season)
- Defensive coordinator: Tim Hundley (2nd season)
- Home stadium: Parker Stadium

1985 Pacific-10 Conference football standings
| | Conf. | | | | | Overall |
| Team | W | | L | | T | W | | L | | T |
|---|---|---|---|---|---|---|---|---|---|---|
| No. 7 UCLA $ | 6 | – | 2 | – | 0 | 9 | – | 2 | – | 1 |
| Arizona | 5 | – | 2 | – | 0 | 8 | – | 3 | – | 1 |
| Arizona State | 5 | – | 2 | – | 0 | 8 | – | 4 | – | 0 |
| Washington | 5 | – | 3 | – | 0 | 7 | – | 5 | – | 0 |
| USC | 5 | – | 3 | – | 0 | 6 | – | 6 | – | 0 |
| Oregon | 3 | – | 4 | – | 0 | 5 | – | 6 | – | 0 |
| Washington State | 3 | – | 5 | – | 0 | 4 | – | 7 | – | 0 |
| Stanford | 3 | – | 5 | – | 0 | 4 | – | 7 | – | 0 |
| Oregon State | 2 | – | 6 | – | 0 | 3 | – | 8 | – | 0 |
| California | 2 | – | 7 | – | 0 | 4 | – | 7 | – | 0 |
$ – Conference champion; Rankings from AP Poll

The 1985 Oregon State Beavers football team represented Oregon State University in the 1985 NCAA Division I-A football season. The Beavers started the season 2–0, their best start in 18 years, but lost all but one of their remaining games to post their 18th consecutive losing season. The Beavers' 3–8 record was their best in seven years. The 1985 season is best known for Oregon State's 21–20 win over Washington, the largest point spread upset before Stanford's 2007 win over USC.

== Schedule ==
| Date | Opponent | Site | TV | Result | Attendance | Source |
|---|---|---|---|---|---|---|
| September 7 | Idaho* | Parker Stadium; Corvallis, OR | | W 43–28 | 26,154 | |
| September 14 | vs. California | Civic Stadium; Portland, OR | | W 23–20 | 21,182 | |
| September 21 | Fresno State* | Parker Stadium; Corvallis, OR | | L 24–33 | 31,162 | |
| September 28 | vs. Grambling State* | Independence Stadium; Shreveport, LA | | L 6–23 | 13,396 | |
| October 5 | at USC | Los Angeles Memorial Coliseum; Los Angeles, CA | | L 0–63 | 50,624 | |
| October 12 | Washington State | Parker Stadium; Corvallis, OR | | L 0–34 | 27,236 | |
| October 19 | at Washington | Husky Stadium; Seattle, WA | | W 21–20 | 58,771 | |
| November 2 | Arizona^{†} | Parker Stadium; Corvallis, OR | | L 6–27 | 21,384 | |
| November 9 | at Stanford | Stanford Stadium; Stanford, CA | TBS | L 24–39 | 26,000 | |
| November 16 | at No. 13 UCLA | Rose Bowl; Pasadena, CA | | L 0–41 | 45,102 | |
| November 23 | at Oregon | Autzen Stadium; Eugene, OR (Civil War) | | L 13–34 | 41,805 | |
*Non-conference game; ^{†}Homecoming; Rankings from AP Poll released prior to the game

== Before the season ==
Joe Avezzano compiled a 6-47-2 record at Oregon State from 1980 to 1984. The university allowed his five-year contract to expire on November 23. After Oakland Raiders' assistant coach, Sam Boghosian, withdrew his name from consideration, Idaho's head coach, Dennis Erickson, became the front runner. Erickson wanted the job, and Athletic Director, and former head coach, Dee Andros, wanted to hire him. However, President John Byrne waited. Eventually, Erickson withdrew his name for consideration along with a couple of the other more obvious choices.

After more than five weeks, long enough for the search to become a regional joke, the university settled on Dave Kragthorpe, the Athletic Director at Utah State. Kragthorpe had four years of head coaching experience at South Dakota State and Idaho State, where he employed the "Air Express" offense. However, he had not coached in three years. The head coaching search led to Andros losing his position as Athletic Director. Andros was "promoted" to a special two-year fundraising position created specifically for him.

Oregon State's starting quarterback in 1984, Ricky Greene, transferred to Western Oregon, and Greene's backup, Steve Steenwyck, was declared academically ineligible. Three days before the first game, after the ambidextrous scrambler, Shaun Shahan, lost a close quarterback battle to fellow redshirt freshman, Erik Wilhelm, Shahan quit the team as well. In addition to losing three quarterbacks in the offseason, Oregon State also lost all but three defensive starters. The Beavers did however return the Pac-10's most prolific receiver in both 1983 and 1984, Reggie Bynum. Bynum entered the season having caught the first, second, and fourth longest passes in Beaver history.

== Game summaries ==
=== Idaho ===
| | 1 | 2 | 3 | 4 | Total |
|---|---|---|---|---|---|
| Vandals | 16 | 7 | 0 | 5 | 28 |
| Beavers | 9 | 14 | 3 | 17 | 43 |

Idaho and Oregon State met 27 times between 1937 and 1966. Between 1967 and 1983, the two teams did not play, but the series resumed in 1984 in Moscow. The Vandals won that game 41-22, playing without starting quarterback, Scott Linehan. Idaho had not won back to back games in the series since 1937–1938. The Beavers entered every game in 1985 as underdogs. The Beavers-Vandals spread was the lowest spread of the season for the Beavers with Idaho favored by a mere 5 1/2 points.

It took Oregon State almost half of a quarter to get its first first down. By that time, Wilhelm had thrown two interceptions and Idaho led 16-0. The Beavers scored 23 straight points to post a 23-16 lead, but Linehan ran in from four yards out with one second left in the first half to tie the game at 23. After Idaho again knotted the game at 26, Oregon State marched from its own one-yard line to set up Dave Nielsen's 36-yard field goal with 5:44 left. On the ensuing kickoff, the Vandals fumbled and the Beavers recovered at the Idaho eight. Bynum caught his fourth touchdown reception on the next play. Lavance Northington ended the Vandals' following drive by intercepting a pass at the Beaver 14 with 3:19 left. However, after Oregon State's drive stalled, Idaho blocked the Beavers' punt. The ball rolled out of the end zone for a safety. Idaho failed to field Oregon State's free kick, which Oregon State's Brian Swanson recovered at the Vandal nine. From there, Darvin Malone scored on his second carry, giving the Beavers a 43-28 win. Wilhelm finished with 27 completions and four touchdown passes, which tied Oregon State records. Bynum caught all four of Wilhelm's touchdown passes, which set a Beaver record and tied a Pac-10 record. Idaho's coach was Dennis Erickson, Oregon State's future coach. The Beavers did not play an Erickson-coached team again until the 1988 Oregon State-Washington State game. It was Oregon State's last win over an Erickson-coached football team for more than two decades.

=== California ===
| | 1 | 2 | 3 | 4 | Total |
|---|---|---|---|---|---|
| Golden Bears | 0 | 10 | 3 | 7 | 20 |
| Beavers | 7 | 6 | 7 | 3 | 23 |

Oregon State had not won two consecutive games in seven years and had not started a season 2-0 in 18 years. The game was played on the rain-slicked turf of Civic Stadium in Portland, Oregon. The Beavers scored first on a four-play 39-yard drive, capped off by a nine-yard Wilhelm to Bynum connection. In the second quarter, California drove to the Oregon State two. On fourth down, the Bears lined up for a field goal, but the snap was fumbled. California's kicker, Leland Rix, got to the ball and scooped it to tight end Don Noble, who ran in the "pass" for a game-tying touchdown. After the Bears took the lead, Oregon State scored on a 16-yard touchdown pass from Wilhelm to Dave Montagne with time running out in the first half to take a 13-10 halftime lead, despite Wilhelm's four first half interceptions.

Oregon State's offense did not commit a second-half turnover. After California tied the game at 13 late in the third quarter, Wilhelm hit Bynum for a 66-yard touchdown pass. The Bears tied the game again at 20 early in the fourth quarter. The game took its toll on Oregon State. Two different strong safeties were injured during the game. In fact, the only starting defensive back to play the whole game was cornerback Lavance Northington. The other starting cornerback, Brian McElroy, was knocked out for the remainder of the season. Oregon State got the ball back for the last time with 4:08 left. On fourth-and-four at the California 40 with 1:26 left, Wilhelm hit Bynum for a five-yard gain. On the next play, Darvin Malone rambled 32 yards for a first down at the Bear three with 51 seconds left. The Beavers got the ball to the two and almost let the game clock expire. However, Jim Nielsen made his way onto the field to convert a 20-yard field goal with no time left. Oregon State's win remains its last in Portland.

=== Fresno State ===
| | 1 | 2 | 3 | 4 | Total |
|---|---|---|---|---|---|
| Bulldogs | 0 | 9 | 21 | 3 | 33 |
| Beavers | 6 | 0 | 3 | 15 | 24 |

In the 23 seasons from 1981 to 2003, Oregon State and Fresno State played 13 times, more than three times more often than any other nonconference opponent in the same period. The Beavers won the first meeting 31-28 in the largest comeback ever, at the time. The Bulldogs looked to even the series. Jim Sweeney, coach of Fresno State was no stranger to Oregon State, having coached Washington State from 1968 to 1975.

The Beavers started their first drive at the Bulldog nine after a fumble, and Oregon State's second drive breached the Fresno State six, but both drives ended in Jim Nielsen field goals. In the second quarter, Fresno State responded with three field goals of their own, the last field goal with two seconds left in the first half.

In the second half, rather than choosing to receive, Fresno State chose to kick with the wind. After Glenn Pena pinned the Bulldogs at their own 5-yard line with a 37-yard punt, Jim Sweeney's son Kevin Sweeney hit Stephen Baker "the Touchdown Maker" for a 95-yard touchdown, when the defensive back guarding Baker fell down. The play is the longest pass play in Parker Stadium history. In 2000, after Parker Stadium was renamed Reser Stadium, Chad Johnson (Ochocinco) finally broke the record, when he caught a 97-yard touchdown from Jonathan Smith. The Bulldogs converted the extra point for a 16-6 lead. In the next 4:44, Fresno State scored another two touchdowns on six offensive plays to take a 30-9 lead. The Bulldogs tacked on a fourth-quarter field goal for a 33-9 lead. Oregon State scored two fourth-quarter touchdowns to pull within 11. The Beavers' last chance ended when the Bulldogs' punter was able to recover a bad snap for a safety with 11 seconds left. The wind played a big factor in the game, as the team with the wind outscored the other team a combined 51-6. Wilhelm finished 28 for 51, setting a new Oregon State record for completions and tying an Oregon State record for attempts. The win was Fresno State's first in Corvallis, and the win was Jim Sweeney's first over Oregon State since 1973. The Bulldogs finished the season 11-0-1, the only undefeated team in Division I-A.

=== Grambling State ===
| Team | 1 | 2 | 3 | 4 | Total |
|---|---|---|---|---|---|
| Oregon St | 0 | 3 | 0 | 3 | 6 |
| • Grambling St | 14 | 0 | 0 | 9 | 23 |

- Date: September 28
- Location: Independence Stadium, Shreveport, Louisiana

Scoring summary
| 1 | 4:17 | GSU | Hill 9-yard run (Nobohar kick) | GSU 7-0 |
| 1 | 0:35 | GSU | Hill 20-yard pass from Landry (Nobohar kick) | GSU 14-0 |
| 2 | 0:00 | OSU | Nielsen 53-yard field goal | GSU 14-3 |
| 4 | 11:04 | OSU | Nielsen 37-yard field goal | GSU 14-6 |
| 4 | 5:56 | GSU | Safety, Gonzales tackled in end zone by Harris | GSU 16-6 |
| 4 | 1:18 | GSU | Cowley 3-yard pass from Landry (Nobohar kick) | GSU 23-6 |

After the 1969 Fred Milton affair, Dee Andros was branded as a racist in many circles. In an effort to entice more black football players to enroll, Oregon State signed a home-and-home contract with Grambling State. The Tigers won the 1975 game in Portland 19-12, Dee Andros' final year. As Andros was no longer the Beavers' coach, much of the impetus to play Grambling had subsided. However, the Beavers could not afford to buy out the contract to play the 1985 game in Shreveport, Louisiana against the Division I-AA Tigers. Grambling State's head coach was Eddie Robinson with 322 career head coaching victories, one win short of Paul "Bear" Bryant's record of 323 career wins. 13,396 fans showed up for the event, filling less than a third of Independence Stadium. The Beavers' share of the gate was not enough to offset the travel costs, so the university lost money on the game.

Grambling State scored two first-quarter touchdowns. Jim Nielsen kicked a 53-yard field goal with one second left in the first half, to pull within 11. On the last play of the third quarter, Wilhelm suffered a season-ending injury. Rich Gonzales took his place, leading the Beavers to another Jim Nielsen field goal. Grambling State safety, James Harris, tackled Gonzales in the end zone for a safety, and the Tigers tacked on a touchdown to win 23-6. Oregon State was penalized 16 times for 159 yards, while Grambling State was penalized 6 times for 49 yards. Kragthorpe cited the disproportionate number of penalties as a key reason for the loss. Many columnists also noted the large penalty disparity.

As of 2017, this game is Oregon State's only trip to Shreveport, Louisiana.

=== USC ===
| | 1 | 2 | 3 | 4 | Total |
|---|---|---|---|---|---|
| Beavers | 0 | 0 | 0 | 0 | 0 |
| Trojans | 7 | 21 | 14 | 21 | 63 |

USC began the year beating #11 Illinois by 10 points in Urbana, Illinois. After the win, recruiting violations were uncovered, leading to an assistant coach being fired. The Trojans, in turmoil, proceeded to lose to Baylor by a touchdown in the Coliseum and Arizona State by 24 points in Tempe, Arizona. Entering the game, Tailback U had not scored a rushing touchdown in 1985. Kragthorpe described the Trojans as a bear with a burnt paw.

On Oregon State's first drive, the Beavers drove 55 yards, to set up a 52-yard field goal attempt, which Jim Nielsen missed. The Trojans wound up rushing for 387 yards and four touchdowns; the Beavers rushed for -3 yards and never breached the Trojan 30-yard line. Gonzales passed for 94 yards but rushed six times for -61 yards. Bynum entered the game, the second-leading receiver in the country but was held to seven catches for 70 yards. The 63-point loss is the largest in Oregon State's history.

=== Washington State ===
| | 1 | 2 | 3 | 4 | Total |
|---|---|---|---|---|---|
| Cougars | 0 | 20 | 7 | 7 | 34 |
| Beavers | 0 | 0 | 0 | 0 | 0 |

Washington State's quarterback was future Super Bowl MVP Mark Rypien. In their first five games, the Cougars primarily ran a veer offense. During the game, Washington State debuted the wishbone offense. Rypien ran for two touchdowns and his replacement ran for another. In turn, Oregon State's quarterback was sacked four times and tackled behind the line of scrimmage twice more to finish the game carrying six times for -51 yards. To make matters worse, Bynum was injured early in the second quarter and did not return for three weeks. No Beaver team had ever lost two consecutive games by 97 points.

=== Washington ===
| Team | 1 | 2 | 3 | 4 | Total |
|---|---|---|---|---|---|
| • Oregon St | 7 | 7 | 0 | 7 | 21 |
| Washington | 3 | 7 | 7 | 3 | 20 |

- Date: October 19
- Location: Husky Stadium, Seattle, WA

Scoring summary
| 1 | WASH | Jaeger 28-yard field goal | WASH 3-0 |
| 1 | OSU | Malone 43-yard pass from Gonzales (Nielsen kick) | OSU 7-3 |
| 2 | WASH | Weathersby 2-yard run (Jaeger kick) | WASH 10-7 |
| 2 | OSU | Gonzales 20-yard run (Nielsen kick) | OSU 14-10 |
| 3 | WASH | Covington 14-yard run (Jaeger kick) | WASH 17-14 |
| 4 | WASH | Jaeger 43-yard field goal | WASH 20-14 |
| 4 | OSU | Northington recovered blocked punt in end zone (Nielsen kick) | OSU 21-20 |

Washington entered the game atop the Pac-10, on a four-game winning streak. The Huskies had finished 1984 as the #2 team in the nation behind #1 BYU, having defeated previous #2 Oklahoma 28-17 in the Orange Bowl. Washington won the previous 10 meetings with Oregon State by a combined score of 332-89, averaging winning 33-9 in each meeting. Las Vegas oddsmakers made the Huskies 38-point favorites. In the days leading up to the game, Steve Rudman of the Seattle Post-Intelligencer compared Oregon State to Barney Fife and called the Beavers a "blight" and an "embarrassment". The Seattle media had called a Husky victory a sure thing. David Whitley of the Orlando Sentinel said that the game pitted "David versus Goliath if David had two broken legs and had chickenpox."

Washington struck first on a 28-yard field goal. Gonzales responded by throwing a 43-yard strike to Darvin Malone for a 7-3 lead. The Huskies immediately responded going 80 yards in 15 plays. Washington threatened in the second quarter, first-and-goal at Oregon State's eight. They were pushed back to the ten before the Beavers' Reggie Hawkins, a converted wide receiver, was able to intercept a Husky pass in the end zone. Taking over at their 20, Oregon State drove 70 yards on seven completions. A second Gonzales to Malone touchdown pass was nullified on a holding call. On the next play, Gonzales sauntered 20 yards untouched into the end zone to propel the Beavers to a 14-10 lead. Michael Lopez intercepted a pass at the Washington 42. Oregon State drove 17 yards, but Jim Nielsen's 42-yard field goal was blocked with no time left on the clock.

In the third quarter, Washington drove down to the Oregon State three but did not gain a yard on three attempts. On fourth down, holder and backup quarterback, Chris Chandler fumbled the snap. He recovered in time to throw an interception to Lavance Northington. On an ensuing drive, the Huskies scored a touchdown to take a 17-14 lead. With 1:32 left in the quarter, the Huskies had the ball first-and-goal at the Beaver one. On first down, Osia Lewis tackled Washington's starting tailback, Vince Weathersby, outside of the end zone. On second down, Paul Saunders knocked Hugh Millen back for a loss on a quarterback sneak. On third down, Lewis "killed" Weathersby. Lewis' hit knocked the ball loose and knocked Weathersby out of the game. The Beavers' Lavance Northington recovered the loose football. Weathersby joined Washington's starting fullback, Rick Fenney, and wide receiver, Lonzell Hill, on the sidelines for the remainder of the game. With 7:59 left in the game, the Huskies hit a 43-yard field goal to stretch the lead to 20-14. The Beavers drove down to the Washington 11 but turned the ball over on downs with 3:22 left. The Huskies pushed the ball to their own 30 but were forced to punt with 1:29 left. Watching film before the game, the Beavers' Andre Todd noticed that the blocker he was matched up against tended to block to the outside. Todd faked outside and cut inside untouched, managing to block the punt, which bounded into the end zone. If not for a queer bounce, it likely would have squirted out of bounds for a safety, but Northington out-raced Todd to pounce on the ball for a touchdown, knotting the score at 20. Northington finished with two fumble recoveries, an interception, and a touchdown. Nielsen's extra point gave Oregon State a 21-20 lead. Washington managed to make it to the 50 before turning the ball over on downs. Oregon State could not manage to run out the clock, punting the ball back to the Huskies with 20 seconds left. Washington made it to their own 26. On the last play of the game, Lopez intercepted his second Washington pass at the Beaver 37.

Oregon State was the first team to upset a 38-point favorite, the greatest Las Vegas line upset in history at the time. It was the Beavers' first road win over a Division I-A opponent since their 32-31 win over the Cougars in 1978. Coming into the game Gonzales had been sacked 15 times. Kragthorpe tried to run more shotgun plays to buy Gonzales more time. Gonzales was only sacked three times. Gonzales finished completing 26 of 42 passes for 298 yards. Osia Lewis' 21 tackles were the second most in Oregon State history. His four tackles for loss set an Oregon State record. Dave Kragthorpe waited in an empty room for his post game interview, but the Seattle media never showed up. The 3-4 start was the Beavers' best start after seven games in 15 years.

=== Arizona ===
| | 1 | 2 | 3 | 4 | Total |
|---|---|---|---|---|---|
| Wildcats | 7 | 10 | 0 | 10 | 27 |
| Beavers | 0 | 0 | 6 | 0 | 6 |

Oregon State finished with more passing yards, but the Wildcats outrushed the Beavers 203-0. Arizona's offense breached the Oregon State 31 six times but only converted the six trips into six points. In the first quarter, the Wildcats' Don Be'Ans blocked Glenn Pena's punt and Martin Rudolph picked up the ball and ran it in for a touchdown and a 7-0 Arizona lead. Pena was so fazed that his next two punts each only carried 19 yards. He was subsequently replaced by Chip Stempeck. On one drive Gonzales was stripped by Craig Vesling in the end zone and Arizona's Byron Evans recovered for a 14-0 lead. Max Zendejas tacked on a 22-yard field goal for a 17-0 lead with 2:03 left in the half. The Beavers only managed to cross the 50 three times. Following the Zendejas field goal, Oregon State drove into Arizona territory but Gonzales was called for intentional grounding after throwing a pass to a lineman. On their second drive of the second half, the Beavers drove 39 yards for a touchdown to pull within 11. After a Michael Lopez interception and return to the Arizona 19, Oregon State was called for delay of game and Gonzales was sacked for a nine-yard loss. On fourth down, Jim Nielsen's 51-yard field goal attempt sailed wide right. Early in the fourth quarter Zendejas tacked on a 25-yard field goal for a 20-6 lead. Gonzales was replaced by Don Lema late in the fourth quarter. With 39 seconds left, Lema got hit as he threw. The wobbly ball fell into the arms of Boomer Gibson, who returned the interception 40 yards for a touchdown and 27-6 victory. Bynum returned to play in his final game in Corvallis and finished with four receptions to break Steve Coury's all-time Beaver reception record.

=== Stanford ===
| | 1 | 2 | 3 | 4 | Total |
|---|---|---|---|---|---|
| Beavers | 7 | 9 | 0 | 8 | 24 |
| Cardinal | 7 | 15 | 7 | 10 | 39 |

After the teams traded first-quarter touchdowns, Oregon State drove to the one-yard line. On fourth down, Darvin Malone was stopped cold. On the very next play, the Beavers' Harold Johnson tackled Brad Muster for a safety. However, Robert Adams and Reggie Hawkins mishandled the free kick, pinning Oregon State at their 15. After going nowhere, Chip Stempeck mishandled a bad snap and ran out of the side of the end zone for a safety. Stanford fielded the free kick and drove for a touchdown, capped by Muster's three-yard scamper. A Gonzales' interception at the Beaver 21 set up a David Sweeney field goal. On the next drive, Stempeck dropped a perfect snap, which led to a 15-yard punt. The Cardinal used the miscue to set up another Sweeney field goal. Oregon State responded, when Gonzales hit Phil Ross for a 73-yard touchdown pass, the Beavers' longest gain of the season.

In the third quarter, Muster carried 12 times in a 16 play drive that culminated in Muster's second three-yard touchdown scamper. After Stanford only could manage a 17-yard punt, Oregon State drove to the Cardinal nine. From there, Toi Cook intercepted a Gonzales pass in the end zone and returned the pass to the Oregon State 47 before Gonzales knocked Cook out of bounds. The Cardinal converted the interception into a field goal and a 32-16 lead. After Oregon State's next drive stalled at their own 23, Stanford blocked Glenn Pena's punt, which only traveled seven yards. It took the Cardinal nine plays to score a touchdown on a four-yard reverse to take a 39-16 lead. With 2:38 left, Gonzales carried the ball into the end zone after Malone fumbled to pull within 15 to cap scoring.

=== UCLA ===
| | 1 | 2 | 3 | 4 | Total |
|---|---|---|---|---|---|
| Beavers | 0 | 0 | 0 | 0 | 0 |
| Bruins | 3 | 7 | 24 | 7 | 41 |

In the three previous seasons, #13 UCLA had won three consecutive New Year's Day bowl games. They entered the game against Oregon State, only needing two wins to clinch a Rose Bowl berth, their fourth consecutive New Year's Day Bowl game. The Beavers kept it close early, only giving up 10 first half points. Gonzales was knocked out of the game with a back injury midway through the second quarter and was replaced by Don Lema.

UCLA took the second half kickoff and drove 80 yards to take a 17-0 lead. 55 seconds later, James Washington returned an errant Lema pass 29 yards for a 24-0 Bruin lead. From there, UCLA tacked on an additional 17 points to win 41-0. UCLA's quarterback, David Norrie, a Jesuit High School graduate, finished 16-22 for 236 yards and one touchdown in less than three quarters of work. The Bruins lost to the Trojans but backed into the Rose Bowl after the Wildcats upset the Sun Devils. Subsequently, UCLA beat Iowa 45-28 in the Rose Bowl.

=== Oregon ===
| | 1 | 2 | 3 | 4 | Total |
|---|---|---|---|---|---|
| Beavers | 0 | 0 | 7 | 6 | 13 |
| Ducks | 14 | 17 | 3 | 0 | 34 |

The temperature was 26 degrees with a windchill of 5. There were pockets of ice all over the field. Oregon took the opening kickoff and drove 69 yards for a 7-0 lead. Three plays later, the Ducks' E.J. Duffy recovered a fumble at the Beaver 32. Four plays later, Oregon lead 14-0. Less than 10 minutes into the game and before attempting a single pass, Gonzales was knocked out with a head injury. Duffy recovered two more first half fumbles in the Duck red zone. The second at Oregon's eight with 1:53 left in the half. The Ducks drove 92 yards in 1:34 to take a 31-0 lead into the locker rooms.

Oregon scored a field goal early in the second half to take a 34-0 lead. The Beavers' Reggie Hawkins blocked a punt later in the quarter that Northington recovered at the Duck 24. On the next play, Lema threw a touchdown pass to Robert Adams to cut the lead to 27. Oregon State scored its final touchdown with 35 seconds left. The Beavers lined up for two but were called for illegal procedure. Jim Nielsen then missed the extra point. Oregon State's subsequent onside kick failed.

== After the season ==
In 1986, Wilhelm won the starting quarterback position over Gonzales. As a result, Gonzales, a two-sport star, dropped out of Oregon State and concentrated on baseball. In 1990, he led Fullerton State to a College World Series berth but only played in part of one game in Omaha after running into a wall and knocking himself unconscious.

== Roster ==
- QB #15 Rich Gonzalez, Fr.
- Andre Todd, Sr.
- QB Erik Wilhelm

== Team players drafted into the NFL ==
| Player | Position | Round | Pick | NFL club |
|---|---|---|---|---|
| Reggie Bynum | Wide receiver | 9 | 222 | Buffalo Bills |
