= Derwin Williams =

American football player (born 1961)

No. 82
- Position: Wide receiver

Personal information
- Born: May 6, 1961 (age 65); Brownwood, Texas, U.S.
- Listed height: 6 ft 0 in (1.83 m)
- Listed weight: 180 lb (82 kg)

Career information
- High school: Brownwood
- College: New Mexico
- NFL draft: 1984: 7th round, 192nd overall pick

Career history
- New England Patriots (1985–1987); Tampa Bay Buccaneers (1988)*
- * Offseason or practice squad member only

Career NFL statistics
- Receptions: 14
- Receiving yards: 228
- Stats at Pro Football Reference

Derwin Dawayne Williams (born May 6, 1961) is an American former professional football player who was a wide receiver for the New England Patriots of the National Football League (NFL). He played for the Patriots from 1985 through 1987. He played college football for the New Mexico Lobos.

After his retirement, Williams became a resident of Pawtucket, Rhode Island, he also began working as a football official and currently works for Conference USA football games. When his son, Mason Williams, became a prospect in baseball, the Williams family moved to Winter Garden, Florida, where Mason could play baseball all year, to increase his chances of receiving a college scholarship. Mason Williams was selected in the 4th round of the 2015 MLB draft by the New York Yankees.
