= 1985 Lafayette Leopards football team =

American college football season

1985 Lafayette Leopards football
- Conference: Independent
- Record: 6–5
- Head coach: Bill Russo (5th season)
- Captains: John Anderson; Ryan Priest
- Home stadium: Fisher Field

1985 NCAA Division I-AA independents football standings
	Conf.			Overall
Team	W	L	T	W		L		T
No. 9 Georgia Southern ^		–		13	–	2	–	0
No. 11 Eastern Washington ^		–		9	–	3	–	0
No. 18 Richmond		–		8	–	3	–	0
Colgate		–		7	–	3	–	1
Delaware		–		7	–	4	–	0
Tennessee State		–		7	–	4	–	0
No. 16 William & Mary		–		7	–	4	–	0
Lafayette		–		6	–	5	–	0
James Madison		–		5	–	6	–	0
Lehigh		–		5	–	6	–	0
Holy Cross		–		4	–	6	–	1
Florida A&M		–		4	–	7	–	0
Western Kentucky		–		4	–	7	–	0
Bucknell		–		3	–	7	–	0
Northeastern		–		2	–	8	–	0
^ – NCAA Division I-AA playoff participant; Rankings from NCAA Division I-AA Football Committee poll

The 1985 Lafayette Leopards football team was an American football team that represented Lafayette College during the 1985 NCAA Division I-AA football season. In their fifth year under head coach Bill Russo, the Leopards compiled a 6–5 record. John Anderson and Ryan Priest were the team captains. This was Lafayette's final year as an independent, before joining the Colonial League. Future league football opponents on the Leopards' 1985 schedule included Bucknell, Colgate, Lehigh and Towson. The league was later renamed Patriot League, and continues to be Lafayette's conference. Lafayette played home games at Fisher Field on College Hill in Easton, Pennsylvania.

== Schedule ==
Date	Opponent	Site	Result	Attendance	Source
September 14	at New Hampshire	Cowell Stadium; Durham, NH	W 20–7	10,126	
September 21	Colgate	Fisher Field; Easton, PA	L 14–30	11,500	
September 28	Columbia	Fisher Field; Easton, PA	W 20–0	3,500	
October 5	at Cornell	Schoellkopf Field; Ithaca, NY	W 17–3	10,008	
October 12	James Madison^{†}	Fisher Field; Easton, PA	W 20–13	10,500	
October 19	at Navy	Navy–Marine Corps Memorial Stadium; Annapolis, MD	L 14–56	28,402	
October 26	at Rhode Island	Meade Stadium; Kingston, RI	L 21–41	12,933	
November 2	Towson State	Fisher Field; Easton, PA	L 24–27	2,000	
November 9	Bucknell	Fisher Field; Easton, PA	W 47–0	5,500	
November 16	Kutztown	Fisher Field; Easton, PA	W 23–7	350	
November 23	at Lehigh	Taylor Stadium; Bethlehem, PA (The Rivalry)	L 19–24	17,000	
^{†}Homecoming
