= 1985 Brown Bears football team =

American college football season

1985 Brown Bears football
- Conference: Ivy League
- Record: 5–4–1 (4–3 Ivy)
- Head coach: John Rosenberg (2nd season)
- Offensive coordinator: Hank Small (1st season)
- Defensive coordinator: Michael Church (2nd season)
- Captains: B. Heffernan; P. McCormack; T. Moskala
- Home stadium: Brown Stadium

1985 Ivy League football standings
	Conf.					Overall
Team	W		L		T	W		L		T
Penn $	6	–	1	–	0	7	–	2	–	1
Harvard	5	–	2	–	0	7	–	3	–	0
Princeton	5	–	2	–	0	5	–	5	–	0
Brown	4	–	3	–	0	5	–	4	–	1
Yale	3	–	3	–	1	4	–	4	–	1
Dartmouth	2	–	4	–	1	2	–	7	–	1
Cornell	2	–	5	–	0	3	–	7	–	0
Columbia	0	–	7	–	0	0	–	10	–	0
$ – Conference champion

The 1985 Brown Bears football team was an American football team that represented Brown University during the 1985 NCAA Division I-AA football season. Brown finished fourth in the Ivy League.

In their second season under head coach John Rosenberg, the Bears compiled a 5–4–1 record and outscored opponents 200 to 128. B. Heffernan, P. McCormack and T. Moskala were the team captains.

The Bears' 4–3 conference record placed fourth in the Ivy League standings. They outscored Ivy opponents 157 to 138.

Brown played its home games at Brown Stadium in Providence, Rhode Island.

== Schedule ==
Date	Opponent	Site	Result	Attendance	Source
September 21	at Yale	Yale Bowl; New Haven, CT	L 9–10	24,171	
September 28	No. 15 Rhode Island*	Brown Stadium; Providence, RI (rivalry)	W 32–27	10,300	
October 5	Princeton	Brown Stadium; Providence, RI	W 17–0	5,600	
October 12	at Penn	Franklin Field; Philadelphia, PA	L 14–17	25,285	
October 19	Cornell	Brown Stadium; Providence, RI	W 22–0	9,800	
October 26	at Holy Cross*	Fitton Field; Worcester, MA	T 20–20	15,461	
November 2	Harvard	Brown Stadium; Providence, RI	L 17–25	10,600	
November 9	at No. 11 Richmond*	City Stadium; Richmond, VA	L 13–29	18,419	
November 16	at Dartmouth	Memorial Field; Hanover, NH	W 22–0	7,465	
November 23	Columbia	Brown Stadium; Providence, RI	W 34–0	4,250	
*Non-conference game; Rankings from NCAA Division I-AA Football Committee Poll released prior to the game
