= 1985 Tennessee State Tigers football team =

American college football season

1985 Tennessee State Tigers football
- Conference: Independent
- Record: 7–4
- Head coach: William A. Thomas (2nd season)
- Home stadium: Hale Stadium; Vanderbilt Stadium

1985 NCAA Division I-AA independents football standings
	Conf.			Overall
Team	W	L	T	W		L		T
No. 9 Georgia Southern ^		–		13	–	2	–	0
No. 11 Eastern Washington ^		–		9	–	3	–	0
No. 18 Richmond		–		8	–	3	–	0
Colgate		–		7	–	3	–	1
Delaware		–		7	–	4	–	0
Tennessee State		–		7	–	4	–	0
No. 16 William & Mary		–		7	–	4	–	0
Lafayette		–		6	–	5	–	0
James Madison		–		5	–	6	–	0
Lehigh		–		5	–	6	–	0
Holy Cross		–		4	–	6	–	1
Florida A&M		–		4	–	7	–	0
Western Kentucky		–		4	–	7	–	0
Bucknell		–		3	–	7	–	0
Northeastern		–		2	–	8	–	0
^ – NCAA Division I-AA playoff participant; Rankings from NCAA Division I-AA Football Committee poll

The 1985 Tennessee State Tigers football team represented Tennessee State University as an independent during the 1985 NCAA Division I-AA football season. Led by second-year head coach William A. Thomas, the Tigers compiled an overall record of 7–4.

== Schedule ==
Date	Opponent	Site	Result	Attendance	Source
August 31	North Carolina A&T	Hale Stadium; Nashville, TN	W 31–15	15,000	
September 7	at Western Kentucky	L. T. Smith Stadium; Bowling Green, KY	L 17–22	17,600	
September 14	at Jackson State	Mississippi Veterans Memorial Stadium; Jackson, MS	W 44–31	25,417	
September 28	at Florida A&M	Bragg Memorial Stadium; Tallahassee, FL	W 12–0	21,666	
October 5	vs. No. T–8 Mississippi Valley State	Hoosier Dome; Indianapolis, IN (Circle City Classic)	L 13–28	40,000	
October 11	No. 2 Grambling State	Vanderbilt Stadium; Nashville, TN	L 24–31	22,000	
October 19	Tennessee Tech	Hale Stadium; Nashville, TN	W 26–13	8,000	
October 26	Morgan State^{†}	Vanderbilt Stadium; Nashville, TN	W 21–0	30,000	
November 2	vs. Southern	Tiger Stadium; Detroit, MI (Coleman A. Young Foundation Football Classic)	L 10–13	18,539	
November 9	Bethune–Cookman	Hale Stadium; Nashville, TN	W 24–17	2,000	
November 23	at Alabama A&M	Milton Frank Stadium; Huntsville, AL	W 24–14		
^{†}Homecoming; Rankings from NCAA Division I-AA Football Committee Poll released prior to the game
