= 1985 Youngstown State Penguins football team =

American college football season

1985 Youngstown State Penguins football
- Conference: Ohio Valley Conference
- Record: 5–6 (4–3 OVC)
- Head coach: Bill Narduzzi (11th season)
- Captains: Gary Barber; Robert Thompson; Nick Xides
- Home stadium: Stambaugh Stadium

1985 Ohio Valley Conference football standings
| | Conf. | | | | | Overall |
| Team | W | | L | | T | W | | L | | T |
|---|---|---|---|---|---|---|---|---|---|---|
| No. 1 Middle Tennessee $^ | 7 | – | 0 | – | 0 | 11 | – | 1 | – | 0 |
| No. 10 Akron ^ | 5 | – | 2 | – | 0 | 8 | – | 4 | – | 0 |
| No. 17 Murray State | 5 | – | 2 | – | 0 | 7 | – | 3 | – | 1 |
| No. 19 Eastern Kentucky | 5 | – | 2 | – | 0 | 8 | – | 3 | – | 0 |
| Youngstown State | 4 | – | 3 | – | 0 | 5 | – | 6 | – | 0 |
| Austin Peay | 2 | – | 5 | – | 0 | 5 | – | 6 | – | 0 |
| Tennessee Tech | 1 | – | 6 | – | 0 | 1 | – | 10 | – | 0 |
| Morehead State | 0 | – | 7 | – | 0 | 1 | – | 10 | – | 0 |
$ – Conference champion; ^ – NCAA Division I-AA playoff participant; Rankings from NCAA Division I-AA Football Committee poll

The 1985 Youngstown State Penguins football team represented Youngstown State University during the 1985 NCAA Division I-AA football season as a member of the Ohio Valley Conference (OVC). Led by 11th-year head coach Bill Narduzzi, the Penguins compiled an overall record of 5–6 with a mark of 4–3 on conference play, and finished fifth in the OVC.

== Schedule ==
| Date | Opponent | Site | Result | Attendance | Source |
|---|---|---|---|---|---|
| September 7 | at Eastern Michigan* | Rynearson Stadium; Ypsilanti, MI | L 22–27 | 13,702 | |
| September 14 | Cincinnati* | Stambaugh Stadium; Youngstown, OH | L 27–29 | 12,124 | |
| September 21 | Florida A&M* | Stambaugh Stadium; Youngstown, OH | W 28–21 | 13,020 | |
| September 28 | Eastern Kentucky | Stambaugh Stadium; Youngstown, OH | L 29–36 | 8,910 | |
| October 5 | Northeastern* | Stambaugh Stadium; Youngstown, OH | W 23–18 | | |
| October 12 | at Tennessee Tech | Tucker Stadium; Cookeville, TN | W 23–16 | 8,239 | |
| October 19 | Austin Peay^{†} | Stambaugh Stadium; Youngstown, OH | W 35–14 | | |
| October 26 | at No. 7 Northern Iowa* | UNI-Dome; Cedar Falls, IA | L 26–50 | 14,330 | |
| November 2 | at No. 1 Middle Tennessee | Johnny "Red" Floyd Stadium; Murfreesboro, TN | L 21–28 ^{2OT} | 8,000 | |
| November 9 | at No. T–9 Akron | Rubber Bowl; Akron, OH (Steel Tire) | L 5–30 | 16,001 | |
| November 22 | Morehead State | Stambaugh Stadium; Youngstown, OH | W 20–17 | 4,173 | |
*Non-conference game; ^{†}Homecoming; Rankings from NCAA Division I-AA Football Committee Poll released prior to the game
