= 1985 Austin Peay Governors football team =

American college football season

1985 Austin Peay Governors football
- Conference: Ohio Valley Conference
- Record: 5–6 (2–5 OVC)
- Head coach: Emory Hale (5th season)
- Captains: Marlin Chapman; Pat Wilson; Scott Farnell; Mike Mignone
- Home stadium: Municipal Stadium

1985 Ohio Valley Conference football standings
	Conf.					Overall
Team	W		L		T	W		L		T
No. 1 Middle Tennessee $^	7	–	0	–	0	11	–	1	–	0
No. 10 Akron ^	5	–	2	–	0	8	–	4	–	0
No. 17 Murray State	5	–	2	–	0	7	–	3	–	1
No. 19 Eastern Kentucky	5	–	2	–	0	8	–	3	–	0
Youngstown State	4	–	3	–	0	5	–	6	–	0
Austin Peay	2	–	5	–	0	5	–	6	–	0
Tennessee Tech	1	–	6	–	0	1	–	10	–	0
Morehead State	0	–	7	–	0	1	–	10	–	0
$ – Conference champion; ^ – NCAA Division I-AA playoff participant; Rankings from NCAA Division I-AA Football Committee poll

The 1985 Austin Peay Governors football team represented Austin Peay State University as a member of the Ohio Valley Conference (OVC) during the 1985 NCAA Division I-AA football season. Led by fifth-year head coach Emory Hale, the Governors compiled an overall record of 5–6, with a mark of 2–5 in conference play, and finished sixth in the OVC.

== Schedule ==
Date	Opponent	Site	Result	Attendance	Source
September 7	at Cincinnati*	Nippert Stadium; Cincinnati, OH	L 9–31	18,207	
September 14	at Tennessee–Martin*	Pacer Stadium; Martin, TN	W 13–7		
September 21	Livingston*	Municipal Stadium; Clarksville, TN	W 28–22	3,521	
October 4	at No. 19 Eastern Kentucky	Hanger Field; Richmond, KY	L 10–20	12,200	
October 12	at Morehead State	Jayne Stadium; Morehead, KY	W 14–10		
October 19	at Youngstown State	Stambaugh Stadium; Youngstown, OH	L 14–35		
October 26	No. 3 Middle Tennessee	Municipal Stadium; Clarksville, TN	L 14–17		
November 2	Kentucky State*	Municipal Stadium; Clarksville, TN	W 48–0		
November 9	No. 13 Murray State	Municipal Stadium; Clarksville, TN	L 14–16	4,261	
November 16	at Tennessee Tech	Tucker Stadium; Cookeville, TN	W 24–20		
November 23	No. 13 Akron	Municipal Stadium; Clarksville, TN	L 14–17		
*Non-conference game; Rankings from NCAA Division I-AA Football Committee Poll released prior to the game
