= 1985 Bethune–Cookman Wildcats football team =

American college football season

1985 Bethune–Cookman Wildcats football
- Conference: Mid-Eastern Athletic Conference
- Record: 6–4 (3–1 MEAC)
- Head coach: Larry Little (3rd season)
- Home stadium: Memorial Stadium

1985 Mid-Eastern Athletic Conference football standings
| | Conf. | | | | | Overall |
| Team | W | | L | | T | W | | L | | T |
|---|---|---|---|---|---|---|---|---|---|---|
| No. T–12 Delaware State $ | 4 | – | 0 | – | 0 | 9 | – | 2 | – | 0 |
| Bethune–Cookman | 3 | – | 1 | – | 0 | 6 | – | 4 | – | 0 |
| South Carolina State | 2 | – | 2 | – | 0 | 5 | – | 6 | – | 0 |
| North Carolina A&T | 1 | – | 3 | – | 0 | 6 | – | 5 | – | 0 |
| Howard | 0 | – | 4 | – | 0 | 4 | – | 7 | – | 0 |
| Morgan State | 0 | – | 0 | – | 0 | 0 | – | 9 | – | 0 |
$ – Conference champion; Morgan State games did not count as conference games. Morgan State was classified as NCAA Division II. All the other teams were I-AA.; Rankings from NCAA Division I-AA Football Committee poll

The 1985 Bethune–Cookman Wildcats football team represented Bethune–Cookman College (now known as Bethune–Cookman University) as a member of the Mid-Eastern Athletic Conference (MEAC) during the 1985 NCAA Division I-AA football season. Led by third-year head coach Larry Little, the Wildcats compiled an overall record of 6–4, with a mark of 3–1 in conference play, and finished second in the MEAC.

== Schedule ==
| Date | Opponent | Site | Result | Attendance | Source |
|---|---|---|---|---|---|
| September 7 | at UCF* | Florida Citrus Bowl; Orlando, FL | L 37–39 | 21,222 | |
| September 14 | vs. Virginia State* | Gator Bowl Stadium; Jacksonville, FL (Gateway Classic) | W 14–13 | 6,100 | |
| September 21 | Howard | Memorial Stadium; Daytona Beach, FL | W 23–14 | | |
| October 12 | at No. 19 Georgia Southern* | Paulson Stadium; Statesboro, GA | L 24–46 | 8,063 | |
| October 5 | at No. 17 Delaware State | Alumni Stadium; Dover, DE | L 7–51 | 8,500 | |
| October 19 | at South Carolina State | Oliver C. Dawson Stadium; Orangeburg, SC | W 45–36 | | |
| November 2 | North Carolina A&T | Memorial Stadium; Daytona Beach, FL | W 20–14 | 10,700 | |
| November 9 | at Tennessee State* | Hale Stadium; Nashville, TN | L 17–24 | 2,000 | |
| November 16 | at Morris Brown* | Herndon Stadium; Atlanta, GA | W 20–0 | 6,600 | |
| November 23 | vs. Florida A&M* | Tampa Stadium; Tampa, FL (rivalry) | W 31–27 | 41,358 | |
*Non-conference game; Rankings from NCAA Division I-AA Football Committee Poll released prior to the game
