= 1985 Lehigh Engineers football team =

American college football season

1985 Lehigh Engineers football
- Conference: Independent
- Record: 5–6
- Head coach: John Whitehead (10th season)
- Captains: Marty Horn; Wes Walton
- Home stadium: Taylor Stadium

1985 NCAA Division I-AA independents football standings
	Conf.			Overall
Team	W	L	T	W		L		T
No. 9 Georgia Southern ^		–		13	–	2	–	0
No. 11 Eastern Washington ^		–		9	–	3	–	0
No. 18 Richmond		–		8	–	3	–	0
Colgate		–		7	–	3	–	1
Delaware		–		7	–	4	–	0
Tennessee State		–		7	–	4	–	0
No. 16 William & Mary		–		7	–	4	–	0
Lafayette		–		6	–	5	–	0
James Madison		–		5	–	6	–	0
Lehigh		–		5	–	6	–	0
Holy Cross		–		4	–	6	–	1
Florida A&M		–		4	–	7	–	0
Western Kentucky		–		4	–	7	–	0
Bucknell		–		3	–	7	–	0
Northeastern		–		2	–	8	–	0
^ – NCAA Division I-AA playoff participant; Rankings from NCAA Division I-AA Football Committee poll

The 1985 Lehigh Engineers football team was an American football team that represented Lehigh University during the 1985 NCAA Division I-AA football season.

In their tenth and final year under head coach John Whitehead, the Engineers compiled a 5–6 record. Marty Horn and Wes Walton were the team captains.

This would be Lehigh's final year as an independent, before joining the Colonial League. Future league opponents on the Engineers' 1985 schedule included Bucknell, Colgate and Lafayette. The league was later renamed Patriot League, and continues to be Lehigh's home conference as of 2020.

Lehigh played its home games at Taylor Stadium on the university's main campus in Bethlehem, Pennsylvania.

== Schedule ==
Date	Opponent	Site	Result	Attendance	Source
September 14	IUP	Taylor Stadium; Bethlehem, PA	W 49–41		
September 21	Connecticut	Taylor Stadium; Bethlehem, PA	L 24–28	9,500	
September 28	at Princeton	Palmer Stadium; Princeton, NJ	W 34–13	12,000	
October 5	at Colgate	Andy Kerr Stadium; Hamilton, NY	L 14–32	5,100	
October 12	Rhode Island	Taylor Stadium; Bethlehem, PA	L 38–45	13,500	
October 19	at New Hampshire	Cowell Stadium; Durham, NH	L 17–31		
October 26	at Delaware	Delaware Stadium; Newark, DE (rivalry)	W 16–14	17,546	
November 2	William & Mary	Taylor Stadium; Bethlehem, PA	L 29–31	10,800	
November 9	at West Chester	John A. Farrell Stadium; West Chester, PA	L 17–20	6,000	
November 16	at Bucknell	Memorial Stadium; Lewisburg, PA	W 19–0		
November 23	at Lafayette	Taylor Stadium; Bethlehem, PA (The Rivalry)	W 24–19	17,000	
