= 1985 Yale Bulldogs football team =

American college football season

1985 Yale Bulldogs football
- Conference: Ivy League
- Record: 4–4–1 (3–3–1 Ivy)
- Head coach: Carmen Cozza
- Home stadium: Yale Bowl

1985 Ivy League football standings
	Conf.					Overall
Team	W		L		T	W		L		T
Penn $	6	–	1	–	0	7	–	2	–	1
Harvard	5	–	2	–	0	7	–	3	–	0
Princeton	5	–	2	–	0	5	–	5	–	0
Brown	4	–	3	–	0	5	–	4	–	1
Yale	3	–	3	–	1	4	–	4	–	1
Dartmouth	2	–	4	–	1	2	–	7	–	1
Cornell	2	–	5	–	0	3	–	7	–	0
Columbia	0	–	7	–	0	0	–	10	–	0
$ – Conference champion

The 1985 Yale Bulldogs football team represented Yale University in the 1985 NCAA Division I-AA football season. The Bulldogs were led by 21st-year head coach Carmen Cozza, played their home games at the Yale Bowl and finished in fifth place in the Ivy League with a 3–3–1 record, 4–4–1 overall.

Yale did not play its annual in-state matchup against the University of Connecticut, scheduled for September 28. Officials from Yale and the city of New Haven postponed the game, and then canceled it, as Hurricane Gloria approached the Connecticut shore.

== Schedule ==
Date	Opponent	Site	Result	Attendance	Source
September 21	Brown	Yale Bowl; New Haven, CT	W 10–9	24,171	
September 28	Connecticut*	Yale Bowl; New Haven, CT	canceled		
October 5	at Army*	Mitchie Stadium; West Point, NY	L 16–59	40,415	
October 12	Holy Cross*	Yale Bowl; New Haven, CT	W 19–15	22,439	
October 19	at Columbia	Wien Stadium; New York, NY	W 28–12	6,719	
October 26	Penn	Yale Bowl; New Haven, CT	L 7–23	23,449	
November 2	at Dartmouth	Memorial Field; Hanover, NH	T 17–17	14,018	
November 9	Cornell	Yale Bowl; New Haven, CT	L 14–20	19,029	
November 16	at Princeton	Palmer Stadium; Princeton, NJ (rivalry)	L 12–21	8,941	
November 23	Harvard	Yale Bowl; New Haven, CT (The Game)	W 17–6	57,647	
*Non-conference game

== Personnel ==
1985 Yale Bulldogs football team roster
Players
Coaches
Offense

Pos.	#	Name	Class
		Andrews
QB	7	Mike Curtin
		Ted Macauley
WR	82	Kevin Moriarty
QB		Kelly Ryan
		Troxell

Defense

Pos.	#	Name	Class

Special teams

Pos.	#	Name	Class
K		Cucci
K		John Duryea

Head coach

- Carmen Cozza

Coordinators/assistant coaches

Legend

- (C) Team captain
- (S) Suspended
- (I) Ineligible
- Injured
- Redshirt

== Season summary ==
=== At Army ===
Yale Bulldogs at Army Cadets (3–0)

Quarter	1	2	3	4	Total
Yale	0	6	3	7	16
Army	7	17	14	21	59

at Michie Stadium, West Point, New York

- Date: October 5, 1985
- Game attendance: 40,415

Team	Category	Player	Statistics
Yale	Passing	Mike Curtin	11/20, 120 Yds, INT
Yale	Rushing	Ted Macauley	15 Rush, 43 Yds
Yale	Receiving	Kevin Moriarty	5 Rec, 68 Yds
Army	Passing	Rob Healy	3/3, 51 Yds, TD
Army	Rushing	Doug Black	15 Rush, 122 Yds, TD
Army	Receiving	Scott Spellmon	1 Rec, 42 Yds, TD

Scoring summary

Quarter	Time	Drive			Team	Scoring information	Score	
Quarter	Time	Plays	Yards	TOP	Team	Scoring information	YALE	ARMY
1			73		Army	William Lampley 7-yard touchdown run, Craig Stopa kick good	0	7
2					Army	Benny White 33-yard touchdown reception from Rob Healy, Craig Stopa kick good	0	14
2					Yale	Red Macauley 11-yard touchdown reception from Kelly Ryan, 2-point run failed	6	14
2			79		Army	Doug Black 2-yard touchdown run, Craig Stopa kick good	6	21
2					Army	53-yard field goal by Craig Stopa	6	24
3					Yale	27-yard field goal by John Duryea	9	24
3					Army	Tory Crawford 4-yard touchdown run, Craig Stopa kick good	9	31
3					Army	Scott Spellmon 42-yard touchdown reception from Tory Crawford, Craig Stopa kick good	9	38
4					Army	Kevin McKelvy 18-yard touchdown run, Craig Stopa kick good	9	45
4					Army	Alan Edwards 6-yard touchdown run, Craig Stopa kick good	9	52
4					Army	Ed Cole 3-yard touchdown run, Keith Walker kick good	9	59
4					Yale	Troxell 9-yard touchdown reception from Andrews, Cucci kick good	16	59
"TOP" = time of possession. For other American football terms, see Glossary of American football.							16	59
