= 1985 James Madison Dukes football team =

American college football season

1985 James Madison Dukes football
- Conference: Independent
- Record: 5–6
- Head coach: Joe Purzycki (1st season)
- Home stadium: JMU Stadium

1985 NCAA Division I-AA independents football standings
	Conf.			Overall
Team	W	L	T	W		L		T
No. 9 Georgia Southern ^		–		13	–	2	–	0
No. 11 Eastern Washington ^		–		9	–	3	–	0
No. 18 Richmond		–		8	–	3	–	0
Colgate		–		7	–	3	–	1
Delaware		–		7	–	4	–	0
Tennessee State		–		7	–	4	–	0
No. 16 William & Mary		–		7	–	4	–	0
Lafayette		–		6	–	5	–	0
James Madison		–		5	–	6	–	0
Lehigh		–		5	–	6	–	0
Holy Cross		–		4	–	6	–	1
Florida A&M		–		4	–	7	–	0
Western Kentucky		–		4	–	7	–	0
Bucknell		–		3	–	7	–	0
Northeastern		–		2	–	8	–	0
^ – NCAA Division I-AA playoff participant; Rankings from NCAA Division I-AA Football Committee poll

The 1985 James Madison Dukes football team was an American football team that represented James Madison University during the 1985 NCAA Division I-AA football season as an independent. In their first year under head coach Joe Purzycki, the team compiled a 5–6 record.

== Schedule ==
Date	Opponent	Site	Result	Attendance	Source
September 7	at East Tennessee State	Memorial Center; Johnson City, TN	W 14–9		
September 14	Morehead State	JMU Stadium; Harrisonburg, VA	W 35–14	11,700	
September 21	Liberty	JMU Stadium; Harrisonburg, VA	L 3–9	11,000	
September 28	at No. 7 William & Mary	Cary Field; Williamsburg, VA (rivalry)	L 14–31	12,200	
October 5	vs. Richmond	Foreman Field; Norfolk, VA (rivalry/Oyster Bowl)	L 15–31	17,000	
October 12	at Lafayette	Fisher Stadium; Easton, PA	L 13–20	10,500	
October 19	at Appalachian State	Conrad Stadium; Boone, NC	L 0–36	14,007	
October 26	Davidson	JMU Stadium; Harrisonburg, VA	W 28–0	14,000	
November 2	No. 7 Georgia Southern	JMU Stadium; Harrisonburg, VA	W 21–6	5,000	
November 9	at VMI	Alumni Memorial Field; Lexington, Virginia	L 7–14	5,900	
November 23	Towson State	JMU Stadium; Harrisonburg, VA	W 13–0	9,000	
Rankings from NCAA Division I-AA Football Committee Poll released prior to the game
