= 1985 North Carolina A&T Aggies football team =

American college football season

1985 North Carolina A&T Aggies football
- Conference: Mid-Eastern Athletic Conference
- Record: 6–5 (1–3 MEAC)
- Head coach: Mo Forte (4th season)
- Home stadium: Aggie Stadium

1985 Mid-Eastern Athletic Conference football standings
	Conf.					Overall
Team	W		L		T	W		L		T
No. T–12 Delaware State $	4	–	0	–	0	9	–	2	–	0
Bethune–Cookman	3	–	1	–	0	6	–	4	–	0
South Carolina State	2	–	2	–	0	5	–	6	–	0
North Carolina A&T	1	–	3	–	0	6	–	5	–	0
Howard	0	–	4	–	0	4	–	7	–	0
Morgan State	0	–	0	–	0	0	–	9	–	0
$ – Conference champion; Morgan State games did not count as conference games. Morgan State was classified as NCAA Division II. All the other teams were I-AA.; Rankings from NCAA Division I-AA Football Committee poll

The 1985 North Carolina A&T Aggies football team represented North Carolina A&T State University as member of the Mid-Eastern Athletic Conference (MEAC) during the 1985 NCAA Division I-AA football season. Led by fourth-year head coach Mo Forte, the Aggies compiled an overall record of 6–5, with a mark of 1–3 in conference play, and finished fourth in the MEAC.

== Schedule ==
Date	Opponent	Site	Result	Attendance	Source
August 31	at Tennessee State*	Hale Stadium; Nashville, TN	L 15–31	15,000	
September 7	vs. Delaware State	Franklin Field; Philadelphia, PA	L 16–30	10,500	
September 14	at Winston-Salem State*	Groves Stadium; Winston-Salem, NC (rivalry)	L 25–34	20,000	
September 21	at South Carolina State	Oliver C. Dawson Stadium; Orangeburg, SC (rivalry)	L 14–51		
September 28	Morgan State	Aggie Stadium; Greensboro, NC	W 48–20		
October 5	Johnson C. Smith*	Aggie Stadium; Greensboro, NC	W 25–7		
October 12	Fayetteville State*	Aggie Stadium; Greensboro, NC	W 35–0		
October 26	Howard	Aggie Stadium; Greensboro, NC	W 40–14		
November 2	at Bethune–Cookman	Memorial Stadium; Daytona Beach, FL	L 14–20	10,700	
November 16	North Carolina Central*	Aggie Stadium; Greensboro, NC (rivalry)	W 28–19		
November 23	at No. 16 Mississippi Valley State*	Magnolia Stadium; Itta Bena, MS	W 36–35		
*Non-conference game; Rankings from NCAA Division I-AA Football Committee Poll released prior to the game
