= 1985 South Carolina State Bulldogs football team =

American college football season

1985 South Carolina State Bulldogs football
- Conference: Mid-Eastern Athletic Conference
- Record: 5–6 (2–2 MEAC)
- Head coach: Bill Davis (7th season)
- Home stadium: Oliver C. Dawson Stadium

1985 Mid-Eastern Athletic Conference football standings
	Conf.					Overall
Team	W		L		T	W		L		T
No. T–12 Delaware State $	4	–	0	–	0	9	–	2	–	0
Bethune–Cookman	3	–	1	–	0	6	–	4	–	0
South Carolina State	2	–	2	–	0	5	–	6	–	0
North Carolina A&T	1	–	3	–	0	6	–	5	–	0
Howard	0	–	4	–	0	4	–	7	–	0
Morgan State	0	–	0	–	0	0	–	9	–	0
$ – Conference champion; Morgan State games did not count as conference games. Morgan State was classified as NCAA Division II. All the other teams were I-AA.; Rankings from NCAA Division I-AA Football Committee poll

The 1985 South Carolina State Bulldogs football team represented South Carolina State College (now known as South Carolina State University) as a member of the Mid-Eastern Athletic Conference (MEAC) during the 1985 NCAA Division I-AA football season. Led by seventh-year head coach Bill Davis, the Bulldogs compiled an overall record of 5–6, with a mark of 2–2 in conference play, and finished third in the MEAC.

== Schedule ==
Date	Opponent	Site	Result	Attendance	Source
August 31	at Murray State*	Roy Stewart Stadium; Murray, KY	L 21–35	10,000	
September 7	Furman*	Oliver C. Dawson Stadium; Orangeburg, SC	L 31–38		
September 14	Delaware State	Oliver C. Dawson Stadium; Orangeburg, SC	L 20–38	6,143	
September 21	North Carolina A&T	Oliver C. Dawson Stadium; Orangeburg, SC (rivalry)	W 51–14		
September 28	at Howard	Howard Stadium; Washington, DC	W 27–21	12,500	
October 5	at Alcorn State*	Henderson Stadium; Lorman, MS	L 24–39	7,438	
October 12	at Morgan State	Hughes Stadium; Baltimore, MD	W 14–10		
October 19	Bethune–Cookman	Oliver C. Dawson Stadium; Orangeburg, SC	L 36–45		
November 9	at Virginia Union*	Hovey Field; Richmond, VA	W 32–7	1,237	
November 14	at No. 4 Grambling State*	Eddie G. Robinson Memorial Stadium; Grambling, LA	W 13–10		
November 23	No. 10 Georgia Southern*	Oliver C. Dawson Stadium; Orangeburg, SC	L 30–43	6,543	
*Non-conference game; Rankings from NCAA Division I-AA Football Committee Poll released prior to the game
