= 1985 Princeton Tigers football team =

American college football season

1985 Princeton Tigers football
- Conference: Ivy League
- Record: 5–5 (5–2 Ivy)
- Head coach: Ron Rogerson (1st season)
- Captains: Anthony P. DiTommaso; James G. Petrucci
- Home stadium: Palmer Stadium

1985 Ivy League football standings
	Conf.					Overall
Team	W		L		T	W		L		T
Penn $	6	–	1	–	0	7	–	2	–	1
Harvard	5	–	2	–	0	7	–	3	–	0
Princeton	5	–	2	–	0	5	–	5	–	0
Brown	4	–	3	–	0	5	–	4	–	1
Yale	3	–	3	–	1	4	–	4	–	1
Dartmouth	2	–	4	–	1	2	–	7	–	1
Cornell	2	–	5	–	0	3	–	7	–	0
Columbia	0	–	7	–	0	0	–	10	–	0
$ – Conference champion

The 1985 Princeton Tigers football team was an American football team that represented Princeton University during the 1985 NCAA Division I-AA football season. Princeton tied for second in the Ivy League.

In their first year under head coach Ron Rogerson, the Tigers compiled a 5–5 record and were also even on points, scoring 212 and allowing 212. Anthony P. DiTommaso and James G. Petrucci were the team captains.

Princeton's 5–2 conference record tied for second-best in the Ivy League standings. The Tigers outscored Ivy opponents 127 to 96.

Princeton played its home games at Palmer Stadium on the university campus in Princeton, New Jersey.

== Schedule ==
Date	Opponent	Site	Result	Attendance	Source
September 21	at Dartmouth	Memorial Field; Hanover, NH	W 10–3	10,985	
September 28	Lehigh*	Palmer Stadium; Princeton, NJ	L 13–34	12,000	
October 5	at Brown	Brown Stadium; Providence, RI	L 0–17	5,600	
October 12	Columbia	Palmer Stadium; Princeton, NJ	W 31–0	7,080	
October 19	No. 20 Colgate*	Palmer Stadium; Princeton, NJ	L 44–49	8,795	
October 26	at Harvard	Harvard Stadium; Boston, MA (rivalry)	W 11–6	18,000	
November 2	at Penn	Franklin Field; Philadelphia, PA (rivalry)	L 21–31	33,479	
November 9	William & Mary*	Palmer Stadium; Princeton, NJ	L 28–33	6,738	
November 16	Yale	Palmer Stadium; Princeton, NJ (rivalry)	W 21–12	8,941	
November 23	Cornell	Palmer Stadium; Princeton, NJ	W 33–27	8,917	
*Non-conference game; Rankings from NCAA Division I-AA Football Committee Poll released prior to the game
