= 1985 Northeastern Huskies football team =

American college football season

1985 Northeastern Huskies football
- Conference: Independent
- Record: 2–8
- Head coach: Paul Pawlak (5th season)
- Home stadium: Parsons Field

1985 NCAA Division I-AA independents football standings
	Conf.			Overall
Team	W	L	T	W		L		T
No. 9 Georgia Southern ^		–		13	–	2	–	0
No. 11 Eastern Washington ^		–		9	–	3	–	0
No. 18 Richmond		–		8	–	3	–	0
Colgate		–		7	–	3	–	1
Delaware		–		7	–	4	–	0
Tennessee State		–		7	–	4	–	0
No. 16 William & Mary		–		7	–	4	–	0
Lafayette		–		6	–	5	–	0
James Madison		–		5	–	6	–	0
Lehigh		–		5	–	6	–	0
Holy Cross		–		4	–	6	–	1
Florida A&M		–		4	–	7	–	0
Western Kentucky		–		4	–	7	–	0
Bucknell		–		3	–	7	–	0
Northeastern		–		2	–	8	–	0
^ – NCAA Division I-AA playoff participant; Rankings from NCAA Division I-AA Football Committee poll

The 1985 Northeastern Huskies football team was an American football team that represented Northeastern University as an independent during the 1985 NCAA Division I-AA football season. Led by fifth-year head coach Paul Pawlak, the team compiled a 2–8 record.

== Schedule ==
Date	Opponent	Site	Result	Attendance	Source
September 14	at Connecticut	Memorial Stadium; Storrs, CT	L 13–27	6,235	
September 28	at Bucknell	Memorial Stadium; Lewisburg, PA	L 14–21	4,000	
October 5	at Youngstown State	Stambaugh Stadium; Youngstown, OH	L 18–23		
October 12	UMass	Parsons Field; Brookline, MA	L 7–10	5,100	
October 19	at No. 1 Richmond	UR Stadium; Richmond, VA	L 3–31	17,547	
October 26	at No. 20 New Hampshire	Cowell Stadium; Durham, NH	L 21–35		
November 2	Maine	Parsons Field; Brookline, MA	W 14–13		
November 9	at No. 12 Rhode Island	Meade Stadium; Kingston, RI	L 21–34	9,421	
November 16	No. 15 Delaware State	Parsons Field; Brookline, MA	L 6–36	2,500	
November 23	Springfield	Parsons Field; Brookline, MA	W 17–10		
Rankings from NCAA Division I-AA Football Committee Poll released prior to the game
