= 1985 Maine Black Bears football team =

American college football season

1985 Maine Black Bears football
- Conference: Yankee Conference
- Record: 6–5 (2–3 Yankee)
- Head coach: Buddy Teevens (1st season)
- Offensive coordinator: Tim Murphy (1st season)
- Defensive coordinator: John Lovett (1st season)
- Captain: Mark Coutts
- Home stadium: Alumni Field

1985 Yankee Conference football standings
	Conf.					Overall
Team	W		L		T	W		L		T
No. 7 Rhode Island $^	5	–	0	–	0	10	–	3	–	0
UMass	4	–	1	–	0	7	–	4	–	0
New Hampshire	2	–	3	–	0	6	–	4	–	0
Maine	2	–	3	–	0	6	–	5	–	0
Connecticut	1	–	4	–	0	4	–	5	–	0
Boston University	1	–	4	–	0	3	–	8	–	0
$ – Conference champion; ^ – NCAA Division I-AA playoff participant; Rankings from NCAA Division I-AA Football Committee poll

The 1985 Maine Black Bears football team was an American football team that represented the University of Maine as a member of the Yankee Conference during the 1985 NCAA Division I-AA football season. In their first season under head coach Buddy Teevens, the Black Bears compiled a 6–5 record (2–3 against conference opponents) and tied for third out of six teams in the Yankee Conference. Mark Coutts was the team captain.

== Schedule ==
Date	Opponent	Site	Result	Attendance	Source
September 7	Howard*	Alumni Field; Orono, ME	W 35–12		
September 14	American International*	Alumni Field; Orono, ME	W 27–17		
September 21	at Rhode Island	Meade Stadium; Kingston, RI	L 14–34	9,442	
September 28	Boston University	Alumni Field; Orono, ME	L 14–19		
October 5	Central Connecticut State	Alumni Field; Orono, ME	W 51–8		
October 12	No. 1 Richmond	Alumni Field; Orono, ME	L 24–37	5,000	
October 19	at UMass	McGuirk Stadium; Hadley, MA	L 7–20	5,644	
October 26	Connecticut	Alumni Field; Orono, ME	W 28–3		
November 2	at Northeastern	Parsons Field; Brookline, MA	L 13–14		
November 9	New Hampshire	Alumni Field; Orono, ME (rivalry)	W 45–40		
November 16	at No. T–13 Delaware	Delaware Stadium; Newark, DE	W 10–7	15,763	
*Non-conference game; Rankings from NCAA Division I-AA Football Committee Poll released prior to the game
