= 1985 Tennessee Tech Golden Eagles football team =

American college football season

1985 Tennessee Tech Golden Eagles football
- Conference: Ohio Valley Conference
- Record: 1–10 (1–6 OVC)
- Head coach: Gary Darnell (3rd season)
- Home stadium: Tucker Stadium

1985 Ohio Valley Conference football standings
	Conf.					Overall
Team	W		L		T	W		L		T
No. 1 Middle Tennessee $^	7	–	0	–	0	11	–	1	–	0
No. 10 Akron ^	5	–	2	–	0	8	–	4	–	0
No. 17 Murray State	5	–	2	–	0	7	–	3	–	1
No. 19 Eastern Kentucky	5	–	2	–	0	8	–	3	–	0
Youngstown State	4	–	3	–	0	5	–	6	–	0
Austin Peay	2	–	5	–	0	5	–	6	–	0
Tennessee Tech	1	–	6	–	0	1	–	10	–	0
Morehead State	0	–	7	–	0	1	–	10	–	0
$ – Conference champion; ^ – NCAA Division I-AA playoff participant; Rankings from NCAA Division I-AA Football Committee poll

The 1985 Tennessee Tech Golden Eagles football team represented Tennessee Technological University (commonly referred to as Tennessee Tech) as a member of the Ohio Valley Conference (OVC) during the 1985 NCAA Division I-AA football season. Led by third-year head coach Gary Darnell, the Golden Eagles compiled an overall record of 1–10, with a mark of 1–6 in conference play, and finished seventh in the OVC.

== Schedule ==
Date	Opponent	Site	Result	Attendance	Source
September 7	at UNLV*	Sam Boyd Silver Bowl; Whitney, NV	L 7–35	22,123	
September 14	Western Carolina*	Tucker Stadium; Cookeville, TN	L 3–30		
September 28	at No. T–8 Murray State	Roy Stewart Stadium; Murray, KY	L 21–29		
October 5	at Georgia Southern*	Paulson Stadium; Statesboro, GA	L 0–34	9,152	
October 12	Youngstown State	Tucker Stadium; Cookeville, TN	L 16–23	8,239	
October 19	at Tennessee State*	Hale Stadium; Nashville, TN	L 13–26	8,000	
October 26	Morehead State^{†}	Tucker Stadium; Cookeville, TN	W 59–6	9,423	
November 2	No. 13 Akron	Tucker Stadium; Cookeville, TN	L 9–27		
November 9	at Eastern Kentucky	Hanger Field; Richmond, KY	L 17–35		
November 16	Austin Peay	Tucker Stadium; Cookeville, TN	L 20–24		
November 23	at No. 1 Middle Tennessee	Johnny "Red" Floyd Stadium; Murfreesboro, TN	L 12–45		
*Non-conference game; ^{†}Homecoming; Rankings from NCAA Division I-AA Football Committee Poll released prior to the game
