= 1985 Morehead State Eagles football team =

American college football season

1985 Morehead State Eagles football
- Conference: Ohio Valley Conference
- Record: 1–10 (0–7 OVC)
- Head coach: Bill Baldridge (2nd season)
- Home stadium: Jayne Stadium

1985 Ohio Valley Conference football standings
	Conf.					Overall
Team	W		L		T	W		L		T
No. 1 Middle Tennessee $^	7	–	0	–	0	11	–	1	–	0
No. 10 Akron ^	5	–	2	–	0	8	–	4	–	0
No. 17 Murray State	5	–	2	–	0	7	–	3	–	1
No. 19 Eastern Kentucky	5	–	2	–	0	8	–	3	–	0
Youngstown State	4	–	3	–	0	5	–	6	–	0
Austin Peay	2	–	5	–	0	5	–	6	–	0
Tennessee Tech	1	–	6	–	0	1	–	10	–	0
Morehead State	0	–	7	–	0	1	–	10	–	0
$ – Conference champion; ^ – NCAA Division I-AA playoff participant; Rankings from NCAA Division I-AA Football Committee poll

The 1985 Morehead State Eagles football team represented Morehead State University as a member of the Ohio Valley Conference (OVC) during the 1985 NCAA Division I-AA football season. Led by second-year head coach Bill Baldridge, the Eagles compiled an overall record of 1–10, with a mark of 0–7 in conference play, and finished eighth in the OVC.

== Schedule ==
Date	Opponent	Site	Result	Attendance	Source
September 7	Marshall*	Jayne Stadium; Morehead, KY	L 10–27	9,500	
September 14	at James Madison*	JMU Stadium; Harrisonburg, VA	L 14–35	11,700	
September 21	Salem*	Jayne Stadium; Morehead, KY	W 41–14	5,000	
September 28	No. 5 Middle Tennessee	Jayne Stadium; Morehead, KY	L 14–33		
October 5	at No. 7 Murray State	Roy Stewart Stadium; Murray, KY	L 9–35	14,800	
October 12	Austin Peay	Jayne Stadium; Morehead, KY	L 10–14		
October 19	No. 18 Akron	Jayne Stadium; Morehead, KY	L 9–38	5,500	
October 26	at Tennessee Tech	Tucker Stadium; Cookeville, TN	L 6–59	9,423	
November 2	at Western Kentucky*	L. T. Smith Stadium; Bowling Green, KY	L 13–26	10,500	
November 16	Eastern Kentucky	Jayne Stadium; Morehead, KY (rivalry)	L 0–26		
November 22	at Youngstown State	Stambaugh Stadium; Youngstown, OH	L 17–20	4,173	
*Non-conference game; Rankings from NCAA Division I-AA Football Committee Poll released prior to the game
