= 1985 Western Kentucky Hilltoppers football team =

American college football season

1985 Western Kentucky Hilltoppers football
- Conference: Independent
- Record: 4–7
- Head coach: Dave Roberts (2nd season)
- Home stadium: L. T. Smith Stadium

1985 NCAA Division I-AA independents football standings
	Conf.			Overall
Team	W	L	T	W		L		T
No. 9 Georgia Southern ^		–		13	–	2	–	0
No. 11 Eastern Washington ^		–		9	–	3	–	0
No. 18 Richmond		–		8	–	3	–	0
Colgate		–		7	–	3	–	1
Delaware		–		7	–	4	–	0
Tennessee State		–		7	–	4	–	0
No. 16 William & Mary		–		7	–	4	–	0
Lafayette		–		6	–	5	–	0
James Madison		–		5	–	6	–	0
Lehigh		–		5	–	6	–	0
Holy Cross		–		4	–	6	–	1
Florida A&M		–		4	–	7	–	0
Western Kentucky		–		4	–	7	–	0
Bucknell		–		3	–	7	–	0
Northeastern		–		2	–	8	–	0
^ – NCAA Division I-AA playoff participant; Rankings from NCAA Division I-AA Football Committee poll

The 1985 Western Kentucky Hilltoppers football team represented Western Kentucky University as an independent during the 1985 NCAA Division I-AA football season. Led by second-year head coach Dave Roberts, the Hilltoppers compiled a record of 4–7.

== Schedule ==
Date	Opponent	Site	Result	Attendance	Source
September 7	Tennessee State	L. T. Smith Stadium; Bowling Green, KY	W 22–17	17,600	
September 14	at Appalachian State	Conrad Stadium; Boone, NC	L 14–31	13,707	
September 21	at Louisville	Cardinal Stadium; Louisville, KY	L 14–23	36,914	
September 28	at Southwest Missouri State	Briggs Stadium; Springfield, MO	L 7–47	7,515	
October 5	Akron	L. T. Smith Stadium; Bowling Green, KY	L 32–34	23,984	
October 12	at UCF	Citrus Bowl; Orlando, FL	W 47–17	9,163	
October 26	at Eastern Kentucky	Hanger Field; Richmond, KY (rivalry)	L 21–51	19,400	
November 2	Morehead State^{†}	L. T. Smith Stadium; Bowling Green, KY	W 26–13	10,500	
November 9	at No. 1 Middle Tennessee	Johnny "Red" Floyd Stadium; Murfreesboro, TN (rivalry)	L 9–14	8,000	
November 16	Eastern Illinois	L. T. Smith Stadium; Bowling Green, KY	L 13–14	4,500	
November 23	No. T–8 Murray State	L. T. Smith Stadium; Bowling Green, KY (rivalry)	W 27–25	6,000	
^{†}Homecoming; Rankings from NCAA Division I-AA Football Committee Poll released prior to the game
