= 1985 Howard Bison football team =

American college football season

1985 Howard Bison football
- Conference: Mid-Eastern Athletic Conference
- Record: 4–7 (0–4 MEAC)
- Head coach: Willie Jeffries (2nd season)
- Home stadium: Howard Stadium; RFK Stadium

1985 Mid-Eastern Athletic Conference football standings
	Conf.					Overall
Team	W		L		T	W		L		T
No. T–12 Delaware State $	4	–	0	–	0	9	–	2	–	0
Bethune–Cookman	3	–	1	–	0	6	–	4	–	0
South Carolina State	2	–	2	–	0	5	–	6	–	0
North Carolina A&T	1	–	3	–	0	6	–	5	–	0
Howard	0	–	4	–	0	4	–	7	–	0
Morgan State	0	–	0	–	0	0	–	9	–	0
$ – Conference champion; Morgan State games did not count as conference games. Morgan State was classified as NCAA Division II. All the other teams were I-AA.; Rankings from NCAA Division I-AA Football Committee poll

The 1985 Howard Bison football team represented Howard University as a member of the Mid-Eastern Athletic Conference (MEAC) during the 1985 NCAA Division I-AA football season. Led by second-year head coach Willie Jeffries, the Bison compiled an overall record of 4–7, with a mark of 0–4 in conference play, and finished fifth in the MEAC.

== Schedule ==
Date	Opponent	Site	Result	Attendance	Source
September 7	at Maine*	Alumni Field; Orono, ME	L 12–35		
September 14	at Rhode Island*	Meade Stadium; Kingston, RI	L 0–46	6,628	
September 21	at Bethune–Cookman	Memorial Stadium; Daytona Beach, FL	L 14–23		
September 28	South Carolina State	Howard Stadium; Washington, DC	L 21–27	12,500	
October 12	at Winston-Salem State*	Bowman Gray Stadium; Winston-Salem, NC	L 7–12		
October 19	Virginia State*^{†}	RFK Stadium; Washington, DC	W 17–7	13,500	
October 26	at North Carolina A&T	Aggie Stadium; Greensboro, NC	L 14–40		
November 2	Norfolk State*	Howard Stadium; Washington, DC	W 28–21		
November 9	Morehouse*	Howard Stadium; Washington, DC	W 35–26		
November 16	at Morgan State	Hughes Stadium; Baltimore, MD (rivalry)	W 7–3		
November 23	at No. 12 Delaware State	Alumni Stadium; Dover, DE	L 16–38	6,300	
*Non-conference game; ^{†}Homecoming; Rankings from NCAA Division I-AA Football Committee Poll released prior to the game
