= 1985 Florida A&M Rattlers football team =

American college football season

1985 Florida A&M Rattlers football
- Conference: Independent
- Record: 4–7
- Head coach: Rudy Hubbard (12th season)
- Home stadium: Bragg Memorial Stadium

1985 NCAA Division I-AA independents football standings
	Conf.			Overall
Team	W	L	T	W		L		T
No. 9 Georgia Southern ^		–		13	–	2	–	0
No. 11 Eastern Washington ^		–		9	–	3	–	0
No. 18 Richmond		–		8	–	3	–	0
Colgate		–		7	–	3	–	1
Delaware		–		7	–	4	–	0
Tennessee State		–		7	–	4	–	0
No. 16 William & Mary		–		7	–	4	–	0
Lafayette		–		6	–	5	–	0
James Madison		–		5	–	6	–	0
Lehigh		–		5	–	6	–	0
Holy Cross		–		4	–	6	–	1
Florida A&M		–		4	–	7	–	0
Western Kentucky		–		4	–	7	–	0
Bucknell		–		3	–	7	–	0
Northeastern		–		2	–	8	–	0
^ – NCAA Division I-AA playoff participant; Rankings from NCAA Division I-AA Football Committee poll

The 1985 Florida A&M Rattlers football team represented Florida A&M University as an independent during the 1985 NCAA Division I-AA football season. Led by 12th-year head coach Rudy Hubbard, the Rattlers compiled a record of 4–7.

== Schedule ==
Date	Opponent	Site	Result	Attendance	Source
August 31	Kentucky State	Bragg Memorial Stadium; Tallahassee, FL	W 52–6	5,268	
September 7	vs. Georgia Southern	Gator Bowl Stadium; Jacksonville, FL (Bold City Classic)	L 21–27	18,086	
September 21	at Youngstown State	Stambaugh Stadium; Youngstown, OH	L 21–28	13,020	
September 28	Tennessee State	Bragg Memorial Stadium; Tallahassee, FL	L 0–12	21,666	
October 5	at Albany State	Hugh Mills Stadium; Albany, GA	W 31–20	8,268	
October 12	Jackson State	Bragg Memorial Stadium; Tallahassee, FL	L 23–28	7,283	
October 19	vs. Morris Brown	Miami Orange Bowl; Miami, FL (Orange Blossom Classic)	W 10–0	15,023	
October 26	Tuskegee	Bragg Memorial Stadium; Tallahassee, FL	W 34–6	25,000	
November 2	at Alcorn State	Henderson Stadium; Lorman, MS	L 7–28	5,645	
November 16	Southern	Bragg Memorial Stadium; Tallahassee, FL	L 27–38	8,156	
November 23	vs. Bethune–Cookman	Tampa Stadium; Tampa, FL (rivalry)	L 27–31	41,358	
