= 1985 Bucknell Bison football team =

American college football season

1985 Bucknell Bison football
- Conference: Independent
- Record: 3–7
- Head coach: Bob Curtis (11th season)
- Captains: Will McFarland; Joe Shupp
- Home stadium: Memorial Stadium

1985 NCAA Division I-AA independents football standings
	Conf.			Overall
Team	W	L	T	W		L		T
No. 9 Georgia Southern ^		–		13	–	2	–	0
No. 11 Eastern Washington ^		–		9	–	3	–	0
No. 18 Richmond		–		8	–	3	–	0
Colgate		–		7	–	3	–	1
Delaware		–		7	–	4	–	0
Tennessee State		–		7	–	4	–	0
No. 16 William & Mary		–		7	–	4	–	0
Lafayette		–		6	–	5	–	0
James Madison		–		5	–	6	–	0
Lehigh		–		5	–	6	–	0
Holy Cross		–		4	–	6	–	1
Florida A&M		–		4	–	7	–	0
Western Kentucky		–		4	–	7	–	0
Bucknell		–		3	–	7	–	0
Northeastern		–		2	–	8	–	0
^ – NCAA Division I-AA playoff participant; Rankings from NCAA Division I-AA Football Committee poll

The '1985 Bucknell Bison football team represented Bucknell University as an independent during the 1985 NCAA Division I-AA football season. In their 11th and final season under head coach Bob Curtis, the Bison compiled a 3–7 record. Will McFarland and Joe Shupp were the team captains. Bucknell played home games at Memorial Stadium on the university campus in Lewisburg, Pennsylvania.

This was Bucknell's final season as an independent, before joining the Colonial League. Future league opponents on Bucknell's 1985 schedule included Davidson, Lafayette, and Lehigh. The league was later renamed Patriot League, and continues to be the Bisons' home conference as of 2024.

== Schedule ==
Date	Opponent	Site	Result	Attendance	Source
September 14	at Carnegie Mellon	Tech Field; Pittsburgh, PA	L 10–21		
September 21	Davidson	Memorial Stadium; Lewisburg, PA	W 34–14	4,500	
September 28	Northeastern	Memorial Stadium; Lewisburg, PA	W 21–14	4,000	
October 5	at Boston University	Nickerson Field; Boston, MA	L 7–34	2,322	
October 12	New Hampshire^	Memorial Stadium; Lewisburg, PA	L 0–58	7,900	
October 19	No. T–19 Delaware^{†}	Memorial Stadium; Lewisburg, PA	L 7–31	7,640	
October 26	at Columbia	Wien Stadium; New York, NY	W 13–10	2,420	
November 2	Cornell	Memorial Stadium; Lewisburg, PA	L 13–26	2,260	
November 9	at Lafayette	Fisher Field; Easton, PA	L 0–47	5,500	
November 16	Lehigh	Memorial Stadium; Lewisburg, PA	L 0–19		
^{†}Homecoming; ^ Parents Weekend; Rankings from NCAA Division I-AA Football Committee Poll released prior to the game
