= 1985 Boston University Terriers football team =

American college football season

1985 Boston University Terriers football
- Conference: Yankee Conference
- Record: 3–8 (1–4 Yankee)
- Head coach: Steve Stetson (1st season)
- Defensive coordinator: John Lyons (1st season)
- Home stadium: Nickerson Field

1985 Yankee Conference football standings
	Conf.					Overall
Team	W		L		T	W		L		T
No. 7 Rhode Island $^	5	–	0	–	0	10	–	3	–	0
UMass	4	–	1	–	0	7	–	4	–	0
New Hampshire	2	–	3	–	0	6	–	4	–	0
Maine	2	–	3	–	0	6	–	5	–	0
Connecticut	1	–	4	–	0	4	–	5	–	0
Boston University	1	–	4	–	0	3	–	8	–	0
$ – Conference champion; ^ – NCAA Division I-AA playoff participant; Rankings from NCAA Division I-AA Football Committee poll

The 1985 Boston University Terriers football team was an American football team that represented Boston University as a member of the Yankee Conference during the 1985 NCAA Division I-AA football season. In their first season under head coach Steve Stetson, the Terriers compiled a 3–8 record (1–4 against conference opponents), tied for last place in the Yankee Conference, and were outscored by a total of 265 to 172.

== Schedule ==
Date	Opponent	Site	Result	Attendance	Source
September 14	Wake Forest*	Nickerson Field; Boston, MA	L 0–30	12,062	
September 21	New Hampshire	Nickerson Field; Boston, MA	L 13–27		
September 28	at Maine	Alumni Field; Orono, ME	W 19–14		
October 5	Bucknell*	Nickerson Field; Boston, MA	W 34–7	2,322	
October 12	Delaware*	Delaware Stadium; Newark, DE	L 0–21	20,364	
October 19	Rhode Island	Nickerson Field; Boston, MA	L 19–34	4,164	
October 26	at UMass	Alumni Stadium; Hadley, MA	L 14–17	11,072	
November 2	No. 3 Richmond*	Nickerson Field; Boston, MA	W 24–13	2,500	
November 9	Connecticut	Nickerson Field; Boston, MA	L 3–24		
November 16	at Holy Cross*	Fitton Field; Worcester, MA	L 9–30		
November 23	Colgate*	Nickerson Field; Boston, MA	L 37–48	2,485	
*Non-conference game; Rankings from NCAA Division I-AA Football Committee Poll released prior to the game
