= 1985 Dartmouth Big Green football team =

American college football season

1985 Dartmouth Big Green football
- Conference: Ivy League
- Record: 2–7–1 (2–4–1 Ivy)
- Head coach: Joe Yukica (8th season)
- Captains: Robert Brown; Leonard Fontes
- Home stadium: Memorial Field

1985 Ivy League football standings
	Conf.					Overall
Team	W		L		T	W		L		T
Penn $	6	–	1	–	0	7	–	2	–	1
Harvard	5	–	2	–	0	7	–	3	–	0
Princeton	5	–	2	–	0	5	–	5	–	0
Brown	4	–	3	–	0	5	–	4	–	1
Yale	3	–	3	–	1	4	–	4	–	1
Dartmouth	2	–	4	–	1	2	–	7	–	1
Cornell	2	–	5	–	0	3	–	7	–	0
Columbia	0	–	7	–	0	0	–	10	–	0
$ – Conference champion

The 1985 Dartmouth Big Green football team was an American football team that represented Dartmouth College during the 1985 NCAA Division I-AA football season. Dartmouth finished sixth in the Ivy League.

In their eighth season under head coach Joe Yukica, the Big Green compiled a 2–7–1 record and were outscored 199 to 144. Robert Brown and Leonard Fontes were the team captains.

The Big Green's 2–4–1 conference record placed sixth in the Ivy League standings. Dartmouth was outscored 105 to 95 by Ivy opponents.

Dartmouth played its home games at Memorial Field on the college campus in Hanover, New Hampshire.

== Schedule ==
Date	Opponent	Site	Result	Attendance	Source
September 21	Princeton	Memorial Field; Hanover, NH	L 3–10	10,985	
September 28	at New Hampshire*	Cowell Stadium; Durham, NH (rivalry)	L 7–23	9,121	
October 5	Holy Cross*	Memorial Field; Hanover, NH	L 14–17	3,100	
October 12	Colgate*	Memorial Field; Hanover, NH	L 28–54	9,434	
October 19	at Harvard	Harvard Stadium; Boston, MA (rivalry)	L 7–17	15,800	
October 26	at Cornell	Schoellkopf Field; Ithaca, NY (rivalry)	W 20–17	16,000	
November 2	at Yale	Yale Bowl; New Haven, CT	T 17–17	14,018	
November 9	at Columbia	Wien Stadium; New York, NY	W 34–3	6,013	
November 16	Brown	Memorial Field; Hanover, NH	L 0–22	7,465	
November 23	at Penn	Franklin Field; Philadelphia, PA	L 14–19	19,802	
*Non-conference game
