= 1985 Harvard Crimson football team =

American college football season

1985 Harvard Crimson football
- Conference: Ivy League
- Record: 7–3 (5–2 Ivy)
- Head coach: Joe Restic (15th season)
- Captain: James B. Wilkinson
- Home stadium: Harvard Stadium

1985 Ivy League football standings
	Conf.					Overall
Team	W		L		T	W		L		T
Penn $	6	–	1	–	0	7	–	2	–	1
Harvard	5	–	2	–	0	7	–	3	–	0
Princeton	5	–	2	–	0	5	–	5	–	0
Brown	4	–	3	–	0	5	–	4	–	1
Yale	3	–	3	–	1	4	–	4	–	1
Dartmouth	2	–	4	–	1	2	–	7	–	1
Cornell	2	–	5	–	0	3	–	7	–	0
Columbia	0	–	7	–	0	0	–	10	–	0
$ – Conference champion

The 1985 Harvard Crimson football team was an American football team that represented Harvard University during the 1985 NCAA Division I-AA football season. Harvard tied for second in the Ivy League.

In their 15th year under head coach Joe Restic, the Crimson compiled a 7–3 record and outscored opponents 192 to 136. James B. Wilkinson was the team captain.

Harvard's 5–2 conference record tied for second-best in the Ivy League standings. The Crimson outscored Ivy opponents 140 to 92.

The Crimson briefly appeared in the weekly national top 20, achieving No. 16 in the poll released October 1, but fell out of the rankings the next week and remained unranked through the end of the season.

Harvard played its home games at Harvard Stadium in the Allston neighborhood of Boston, Massachusetts.

== Schedule ==
Date	Opponent	Site	Result	Attendance	Source
September 21	at Columbia	Wien Stadium; New York, NY	W 49–17	7,921	
September 28	No. 17 UMass*	Harvard Stadium; Boston, MA	W 10–3	16,500	
October 5	No. 5 William & Mary*	Harvard Stadium; Boston, MA	L 14–21	6,500	
October 12	at Cornell	Schoellkopf Field; Ithaca, NY	W 20–17	15,300	
October 19	Dartmouth	Harvard Stadium; Boston, MA (rivalry)	W 17–7	15,800	
October 26	Princeton	Harvard Stadium; Boston, MA (rivalry)	L 6–11	18,000	
November 2	at Brown	Brown Stadium; Providence, RI	W 25–17	10,600	
November 9	at Holy Cross*	Fitton Field; Worcester, MA	W 28–20	14,697	
November 16	Penn	Harvard Stadium; Boston, MA (rivalry)	W 17–6	18,040	
November 23	at Yale	Yale Bowl; New Haven, CT (The Game)	L 6–17	54,647	
*Non-conference game; Rankings from NCAA Division I-AA Football Committee Poll released prior to the game
