= 1985 Murray State Racers football team =

American college football season

1985 Murray State Racers football
- Conference: Ohio Valley Conference
- Record: 7–3–1 (5–2 OVC)
- Head coach: Frank Beamer (5th season)
- Defensive coordinator: Mike Mahoney (5th season)
- Home stadium: Roy Stewart Stadium

1985 Ohio Valley Conference football standings
	Conf.					Overall
Team	W		L		T	W		L		T
No. 1 Middle Tennessee $^	7	–	0	–	0	11	–	1	–	0
No. 10 Akron ^	5	–	2	–	0	8	–	4	–	0
No. 17 Murray State	5	–	2	–	0	7	–	3	–	1
No. 19 Eastern Kentucky	5	–	2	–	0	8	–	3	–	0
Youngstown State	4	–	3	–	0	5	–	6	–	0
Austin Peay	2	–	5	–	0	5	–	6	–	0
Tennessee Tech	1	–	6	–	0	1	–	10	–	0
Morehead State	0	–	7	–	0	1	–	10	–	0
$ – Conference champion; ^ – NCAA Division I-AA playoff participant; Rankings from NCAA Division I-AA Football Committee poll

The 1985 Murray State Racers football team represented Murray State University during the 1985 NCAA Division I-AA football season as a member of the Ohio Valley Conference (OVC). Led by fifth-year head coach Frank Beamer, the Racers compiled an overall record of 7–3–1, with a mark of 5–2 in conference play, and finished tied for second in the OVC.

== Schedule ==
Date	Opponent	Rank	Site	Result	Attendance	Source
August 31	South Carolina State*		Roy Stewart Stadium; Murray, KY	W 35–21	10,000	
September 7	Southeast Missouri State*		Roy Stewart Stadium; Murray, KY	W 33–25		
September 14	at Memphis State*		Liberty Bowl Memorial Stadium; Memphis, TN	T 10–10	31,524	
September 28	Tennessee Tech	No. T–8	Roy Stewart Stadium; Murray, KY	W 29–21		
October 5	Morehead State	No. 7	Roy Stewart Stadium; Murray, KY	W 35–9	14,800	
October 12	at Akron	No. 6	Rubber Bowl; Akron, OH	L 10–17	8,903	
October 19	at No. 3 Middle Tennessee	No. T–13	Johnny "Red" Floyd Stadium; Murfreesboro, TN	L 24–31 ^{2OT}	13,300	
October 26	at Southwest Missouri State*	No. 19	Briggs Stadium; Springfield, MO	W 36–21		
November 2	No. T–17 Eastern Kentucky	No. 16	Roy Stewart Stadium; Murray, KY	W 27–20	8,500	
November 9	at Austin Peay	No. 13	Municipal Stadium; Clarksville, TN	W 16–14	4,261	
November 23	at Western Kentucky*	No. T–8	L. T. Smith Stadium; Bowling Green, KY (rivalry)	L 25–27	6,000	
*Non-conference game; Rankings from NCAA Division I-AA Football Committee Poll released prior to the game
