= 1985 Delaware Fightin' Blue Hens football team =

American college football season

1985 Delaware Fightin' Blue Hens football
- Conference: Independent
- Record: 7–4
- Head coach: Tubby Raymond (20th season)
- Offensive coordinator: Ted Kempski (18th season)
- Offensive scheme: Delaware Wing-T
- Base defense: 5–2
- Home stadium: Delaware Stadium

1985 NCAA Division I-AA independents football standings
	Conf.			Overall
Team	W	L	T	W		L		T
No. 9 Georgia Southern ^		–		13	–	2	–	0
No. 11 Eastern Washington ^		–		9	–	3	–	0
No. 18 Richmond		–		8	–	3	–	0
Colgate		–		7	–	3	–	1
Delaware		–		7	–	4	–	0
Tennessee State		–		7	–	4	–	0
No. 16 William & Mary		–		7	–	4	–	0
Lafayette		–		6	–	5	–	0
James Madison		–		5	–	6	–	0
Lehigh		–		5	–	6	–	0
Holy Cross		–		4	–	6	–	1
Florida A&M		–		4	–	7	–	0
Western Kentucky		–		4	–	7	–	0
Bucknell		–		3	–	7	–	0
Northeastern		–		2	–	8	–	0
^ – NCAA Division I-AA playoff participant; Rankings from NCAA Division I-AA Football Committee poll

The 1985 Delaware Fightin' Blue Hens football team represented the University of Delaware as an independent during the 1985 NCAA Division I-AA football season. Led by 20th-year head coach Tubby Raymond, the Fightin' Blue Hens compiled a record of 7–4. The team played home games at Delaware Stadium in Newark, Delaware.

== Schedule ==
Date	Opponent	Rank	Site	Result	Attendance	Source
September 7	Rhode Island		Delaware Stadium; Newark, DE	W 29–13	15,465	
September 14	Navy		Delaware Stadium; Newark, DE	W 16–13	23,110	
September 21	at William & Mary		Cary Field; Williamsburg, VA (rivalry)	L 16–17	11,500	
September 28	at Holy Cross	No. 14	Fitton Field; Worcester, MA	L 6–22	16,111	
October 5	West Chester		Delaware Stadium; Newark, DE (rivalry)	W 37–22	21,751	
October 12	Boston University		Delaware Stadium; Newark, DE	W 21–0	20,364	
October 19	at Bucknell	No. T–19	Memorial Stadium; Lewisburg, PA	W 31–7	7,640	
October 26	Lehigh	No. 17	Delaware Stadium; Newark, DE (rivalry)	L 14–16	17,546	
November 2	Temple		Delaware Stadium; Newark, DE	W 27–24	19,614	
November 9	at UMass	No. T–17	Warren McGuirk Alumni Stadium; Hadley, MA	W 27–24	9,121	
November 16	Maine	No. T–13	Delaware Stadium; Newark, DE	L 7–10	15,763	
Rankings from NCAA Division I-AA Football Committee Poll released prior to the game
