= 1985 Eastern Washington Eagles football team =

American college football season

1985 Eastern Washington Eagles football

NCAA Division I-AA Quarterfinal, L 14–17 at Northern Iowa
- Conference: Independent
- Record: 9–3
- Head coach: Dick Zornes (7th season)
- Home stadium: Joe Albi Stadium

1985 NCAA Division I-AA independents football standings
	Conf.			Overall
Team	W	L	T	W		L		T
No. 9 Georgia Southern ^		–		13	–	2	–	0
No. 11 Eastern Washington ^		–		9	–	3	–	0
No. 18 Richmond		–		8	–	3	–	0
Colgate		–		7	–	3	–	1
Delaware		–		7	–	4	–	0
Tennessee State		–		7	–	4	–	0
No. 16 William & Mary		–		7	–	4	–	0
Lafayette		–		6	–	5	–	0
James Madison		–		5	–	6	–	0
Lehigh		–		5	–	6	–	0
Holy Cross		–		4	–	6	–	1
Florida A&M		–		4	–	7	–	0
Western Kentucky		–		4	–	7	–	0
Bucknell		–		3	–	7	–	0
Northeastern		–		2	–	8	–	0
^ – NCAA Division I-AA playoff participant; Rankings from NCAA Division I-AA Football Committee poll

The 1985 Eastern Washington Eagles football team represented Eastern Washington University in the 1985 NCAA Division I-AA football season. This was the Eagles' second season in Division I-AA, having moved up from Division II after 1983, and participated as an independent until joining the Big Sky Conference in 1987. They played their home games at Joe Albi Stadium in nearby Spokane.

Led by seventh-year head coach Dick Zornes, the Eagles went 8–2 in the regular season and earned the program's first Division I-AA playoff bid. They traveled and defeated Big Sky champion Idaho in the first round, avenging a 21-point loss four weeks earlier, then lost by three points in the quarterfinals at Northern Iowa.

== Schedule ==
Date	Opponent	Rank	Site	Result	Attendance	Source
September 7	Chico State		Joe Albi Stadium; Spokane, WA	W 28–3	2,122	
September 14	at Weber State		Wildcat Stadium; Ogden, UT	W 31–19		
September 21	at Montana State		Reno H. Sales Stadium; Bozeman, MT	W 28–23	11,293	
September 28	Northern Arizona		Joe Albi Stadium; Spokane, WA	W 33–0	7,614	
October 5	Fort Lewis		Joe Albi Stadium; Spokane, WA	W 35–24	2,326	
October 12	at No. 11 Nevada	No. 10	Mackay Stadium; Reno, NV	L 25–31	9,650	
October 19	at Long Beach State	No. 17	Veterans Stadium; Long Beach, CA	W 30–23	9,605	
November 2	at No. 8 Idaho	No. T–9	Kibbie Dome; Moscow, ID	L 21–42	15,500	
November 16	Montana	No. T–13	Joe Albi Stadium; Spokane, WA (rivalry)	W 52–19	1,975	
November 23	at Idaho State	No. 11	ASISU MiniDome; Pocatello, ID	W 42–21		
November 30	at No. 5 Idaho	No. 11	Kibbie Dome; Moscow, ID (NCAA Division I-AA First Round)	W 42–38	6,500	
December 7	at No. 4 Northern Iowa	No. 11	UNI-Dome; Cedar Falls, IA (NCAA Division I-AA Quarterfinal)	L 14–17	6,220	
Rankings from NCAA Division I-AA Football Committee Poll released prior to the game
