= 1985 Richmond Spiders football team =

American college football season

1985 Richmond Spiders football
- Conference: Independent
- Record: 8–3
- Head coach: Dal Shealy (6th season)
- Offensive coordinator: Jim Marshall (7th season)
- Home stadium: UR Stadium

1985 NCAA Division I-AA independents football standings
	Conf.			Overall
Team	W	L	T	W		L		T
No. 9 Georgia Southern ^		–		13	–	2	–	0
No. 11 Eastern Washington ^		–		9	–	3	–	0
No. 18 Richmond		–		8	–	3	–	0
Colgate		–		7	–	3	–	1
Delaware		–		7	–	4	–	0
Tennessee State		–		7	–	4	–	0
No. 16 William & Mary		–		7	–	4	–	0
Lafayette		–		6	–	5	–	0
James Madison		–		5	–	6	–	0
Lehigh		–		5	–	6	–	0
Holy Cross		–		4	–	6	–	1
Florida A&M		–		4	–	7	–	0
Western Kentucky		–		4	–	7	–	0
Bucknell		–		3	–	7	–	0
Northeastern		–		2	–	8	–	0
^ – NCAA Division I-AA playoff participant; Rankings from NCAA Division I-AA Football Committee poll

The 1985 Richmond Spiders football team was an American football team that represented the University of Richmond as an independent during the 1985 NCAA Division I-AA football season. In their sixth season under head coach Dal Shealy, Richmond compiled an 8–3 record.

== Schedule ==
Date	Opponent	Rank	Site	Result	Attendance	Source
September 7	at Virginia Tech		Lane Stadium; Blacksburg, VA	W 24–14	21,100	
September 14	UMass		UR Stadium; Richmond, VA	W 19–14	14,068	
September 21	at VMI		Alumni Memorial Field; Lexington, VA (rivalry)	W 28–14	6,800	
September 28	Western Illinois	No. 1	UR Stadium; Richmond, VA	W 38–20	16,102	
October 5	vs. James Madison	No. 1	Foreman Field; Norfolk, VA (rivalry/Oyster Bowl)	W 31–15	17,000	
October 12	at Maine	No. 1	Alumni Field; Orono, ME	W 37–24	5,000	
October 19	Northeastern	No. 1	UR Stadium; Richmond, VA	W 31–3	17,547	
October 26	at Rutgers	No. 1	Rutgers Stadium; Piscataway, NJ	L 17–20	26,552	
November 2	at Boston University	No. 3	Nickerson Field; Boston, MA	L 13–24	2,500	
November 9	Brown	No. 11	UR Stadium; Richmond, VA	W 29–13	18,419	
November 16	at William & Mary	No. 9	Cary Field; Williamsburg, VA (rivalry)	L 17–28	17,301	
Rankings from NCAA Division I-AA Football Committee Poll released prior to the game
