= 1985 Middle Tennessee Blue Raiders football team =

American college football season

1985 Middle Tennessee Blue Raiders football

OVC champion

NCAA Division I-AA Quarterfinal, L 21–28 vs. Georgia Southern
- Conference: Ohio Valley Conference
- Record: 11–1 (7–0 OVC)
- Head coach: Boots Donnelly (7th season)
- Home stadium: Johnny "Red" Floyd Stadium

1985 Ohio Valley Conference football standings
	Conf.					Overall
Team	W		L		T	W		L		T
No. 1 Middle Tennessee $^	7	–	0	–	0	11	–	1	–	0
No. 10 Akron ^	5	–	2	–	0	8	–	4	–	0
No. 17 Murray State	5	–	2	–	0	7	–	3	–	1
No. 19 Eastern Kentucky	5	–	2	–	0	8	–	3	–	0
Youngstown State	4	–	3	–	0	5	–	6	–	0
Austin Peay	2	–	5	–	0	5	–	6	–	0
Tennessee Tech	1	–	6	–	0	1	–	10	–	0
Morehead State	0	–	7	–	0	1	–	10	–	0
$ – Conference champion; ^ – NCAA Division I-AA playoff participant; Rankings from NCAA Division I-AA Football Committee poll

The 1985 Middle Tennessee Blue Raiders football team represented Middle Tennessee State University in the 1985 NCAA Division I-AA football season

== Schedule ==
Date	Opponent	Rank	Site	Result	Attendance	Source
September 7	Lenoir–Rhyne*		Johnny "Red" Floyd Stadium; Murfreesboro, TN	W 37–6		
September 14	at Georgia Southern*		Paulson Stadium; Statesboro, GA	W 35–10	9,227	
September 21	Jacksonville State*		Johnny "Red" Floyd Stadium; Murfreesboro, TN	W 55–21	10,200	
September 28	at Morehead State	No. 5	Jayne Stadium; Morehead, KY	W 33–14		
October 12	No. T–17 Eastern Kentucky	No. T–4	Johnny "Red" Floyd Stadium; Murfreesboro, TN	W 28–14	13,250	
October 19	No. T–13 Murray State	No. 3	Johnny "Red" Floyd Stadium; Murfreesboro, TN	W 31–24 ^{2OT}	13,300	
October 26	at Austin Peay	No. 3	Clarksville Municipal Stadium; Clarksville, TN	W 17–14		
November 2	Youngstown State	No. 1	Johnny "Red" Floyd Stadium; Murfreesboro, TN	W 28–21 ^{2OT}	8,000	
November 9	Western Kentucky*	No. 1	Johnny "Red" Floyd Stadium; Murfreesboro, TN (rivalry)	W 41–9	8,000	
November 16	at No. T–7 Akron	No. 1	Rubber Bowl; Akron, OH	W 17–0		
November 23	Tennessee Tech	No. 1	Johnny "Red" Floyd Stadium; Murfreesboro, TN	W 45–12		
December 7	No. 9 Georgia Southern*	No. 1	Johnny "Red" Floyd Stadium; Murfreesboro, TN (NCAA Division I-AA Quarterfinal)	L 21–28	9,500	
*Non-conference game; Rankings from NCAA Division I-AA Football Committee Poll released prior to the game

== After the season ==
=== NFL draft ===
The following Blue Raider was selected in the 1986 NFL draft following the season.

Round	Pick	Player	Position	NFL club
6	162	Don Griffin	Defensive back	San Francisco 49ers
