= 1985 NCAA Division I-AA football season =

American college football season

1985 NCAA Division I-AA season

Regular season
- Number of teams: 87
- Duration: August–November

Playoff
- Duration: November 30–December 21
- Championship date: December 21, 1985
- Championship site: Tacoma Dome; Tacoma, Washington
- Champion: Georgia Southern

NCAA Division I-AA football seasons
- «1984 1986»

The 1985 NCAA Division I-AA football season, part of college football in the United States organized by the National Collegiate Athletic Association at the Division I-AA level, commenced in August 1985, and concluded with the 1985 NCAA Division I-AA Football Championship Game on December 21, 1985, at the Tacoma Dome in Tacoma, Washington. The Georgia Southern Eagles won their first I-AA championship, defeating the Furman Paladins by a score of 44–42.

== Conference changes and new programs ==
- The Mid-Continent Conference stopped sponsoring football after the 1984 season.
- In 1985, all four members of the Mid-Continent moved their football programs to the Gateway Collegiate Athletic Conference, which otherwise sponsored only women's sports.
- The Missouri Valley Conference, a hybrid I-A/I-AA conference since 1982, played its last season of football in 1985.

(+ Illinois State and Southern Illinois competed in both the Missouri Valley and the Gateway during the 1985 season).

School	1984 Conference	1985 Conference
Eastern Illinois	Mid-Continent	Gateway
Illinois State	Missouri Valley	Gateway+
Northern Iowa	Mid-Continent	Gateway
Southern Illinois	Missouri Valley	Gateway+
Southwest Missouri State	Mid-Continent	Gateway
Western Illinois	Mid-Continent	Gateway

== Conference standings ==
1985 Big Sky Conference football standings
	Conf.					Overall
Team	W		L		T	W		L		T
No. 5 Idaho $^	6	–	1	–	0	9	–	3	–	0
No. T–2 Nevada ^	6	–	1	–	0	11	–	2	–	0
Boise State	5	–	2	–	0	7	–	4	–	0
Weber State	4	–	3	–	0	6	–	5	–	0
Idaho State	3	–	4	–	0	5	–	6	–	0
Montana	2	–	5	–	0	3	–	8	–	0
Northern Arizona	1	–	6	–	0	3	–	8	–	0
Montana State	1	–	6	–	0	2	–	9	–	0
$ – Conference champion; ^ – NCAA Division I-AA playoff participant; Rankings from NCAA Division I-AA Poll

1985 Gateway Collegiate Athletic Conference football standings
	Conf.					Overall
Team	W		L		T	W		L		T
No. 4 Northern Iowa $^	5	–	0	–	0	11	–	2	–	0
Southwest Missouri State	2	–	2	–	1	6	–	4	–	1
Western Illinois	2	–	3	–	0	5	–	5	–	0
Southern Illinois	2	–	3	–	0	4	–	7	–	0
Eastern Illinois	2	–	3	–	0	6	–	5	–	0
Illinois State	1	–	3	–	1	6	–	3	–	2
$ – Conference champion; ^ – NCAA Division I-AA playoff participant; Rankings from NCAA Division I-AA Football Committee poll

1985 Gulf Star Conference football standings
	Conf.					Overall
Team	W		L		T	W		L		T
Stephen F. Austin +	4	–	1	–	0	9	–	2	–	0
Sam Houston State +	4	–	1	–	0	8	–	3	–	0
Nicholls State	2	–	3	–	0	6	–	5	–	0
Northwestern State	2	–	3	–	0	3	–	8	–	0
Southwest Texas State	2	–	3	–	0	3	–	8	–	0
Southeastern Louisiana	1	–	4	–	0	2	–	9	–	0
+ – Conference co-champions; This conference was a hybrid of NCAA Division II and Division I-AA Programs. Sam Houston State was classified as Division II. Stephen F. Austin was also classified as NCAA Division II. All the other teams were I-AA.

1985 Ivy League football standings
	Conf.					Overall
Team	W		L		T	W		L		T
Penn $	6	–	1	–	0	7	–	2	–	1
Harvard	5	–	2	–	0	7	–	3	–	0
Princeton	5	–	2	–	0	5	–	5	–	0
Brown	4	–	3	–	0	5	–	4	–	1
Yale	3	–	3	–	1	4	–	4	–	1
Dartmouth	2	–	4	–	1	2	–	7	–	1
Cornell	2	–	5	–	0	3	–	7	–	0
Columbia	0	–	7	–	0	0	–	10	–	0
$ – Conference champion

1985 Mid-Eastern Athletic Conference football standings
	Conf.					Overall
Team	W		L		T	W		L		T
No. T–12 Delaware State $	4	–	0	–	0	9	–	2	–	0
Bethune–Cookman	3	–	1	–	0	6	–	4	–	0
South Carolina State	2	–	2	–	0	5	–	6	–	0
North Carolina A&T	1	–	3	–	0	6	–	5	–	0
Howard	0	–	4	–	0	4	–	7	–	0
Morgan State	0	–	0	–	0	0	–	9	–	0
$ – Conference champion; Morgan State games did not count as conference games. Morgan State was classified as NCAA Division II. All the other teams were I-AA.; Rankings from NCAA Division I-AA Football Committee poll

1985 Missouri Valley Conference football standings
	Conf.					Overall
Team	W		L		T	W		L		T
Tulsa $	5	–	0	–	0	6	–	5	–	0
West Texas State	3	–	1	–	1	6	–	3	–	1
Illinois State	3	–	1	–	1	6	–	3	–	2
Indiana State	3	–	2	–	0	4	–	6	–	0
Wichita State	2	–	3	–	0	3	–	8	–	0
Southern Illinois	1	–	3	–	0	4	–	7	–	0
Drake	1	–	5	–	0	4	–	7	–	0
$ – Conference champion; The conference was a hybrid of NCAA Division I-A and I-AA programs. Tulsa and Wichita State were I-A and the other teams were I-AA.

1985 Ohio Valley Conference football standings
	Conf.					Overall
Team	W		L		T	W		L		T
No. 1 Middle Tennessee $^	7	–	0	–	0	11	–	1	–	0
No. 10 Akron ^	5	–	2	–	0	8	–	4	–	0
No. 17 Murray State	5	–	2	–	0	7	–	3	–	1
No. 19 Eastern Kentucky	5	–	2	–	0	8	–	3	–	0
Youngstown State	4	–	3	–	0	5	–	6	–	0
Austin Peay	2	–	5	–	0	5	–	6	–	0
Tennessee Tech	1	–	6	–	0	1	–	10	–	0
Morehead State	0	–	7	–	0	1	–	10	–	0
$ – Conference champion; ^ – NCAA Division I-AA playoff participant; Rankings from NCAA Division I-AA Football Committee poll

1985 Southern Conference football standings
	Conf.					Overall
Team	W		L		T	W		L		T
No. T–2 Furman $^	6	–	0	–	0	12	–	2	–	0
No. T–12 Appalachian State	6	–	1	–	0	8	–	3	–	0
Chattanooga	5	–	2	–	0	6	–	5	–	0
Marshall	3	–	3	–	1	7	–	3	–	1
The Citadel	2	–	4	–	1	5	–	5	–	1
Western Carolina	2	–	4	–	1	4	–	6	–	1
VMI	1	–	4	–	1	3	–	7	–	1
East Tennessee State	0	–	7	–	0	0	–	10	–	1
Davidson	0	–	2	–	0	1	–	10	–	0
$ – Conference champion; ^ – NCAA Division I-AA playoff participant; Rankings from NCAA Division I-AA Football Committee poll

1985 Southland Conference football standings
	Conf.					Overall
Team	W		L		T	W		L		T
No. 6 Arkansas State $^	5	–	1	–	0	9	–	4	–	0
No. 14 Louisiana Tech	4	–	2	–	0	8	–	3	–	0
McNeese State	3	–	1	–	2	6	–	3	–	2
Northeast Louisiana	3	–	3	–	0	6	–	5	–	0
North Texas State	2	–	3	–	1	4	–	6	–	1
UT Arlington	2	–	3	–	1	4	–	6	–	1
Lamar	0	–	6	–	0	2	–	9	–	0
$ – Conference champion; ^ – NCAA Division I-AA playoff participant; Rankings from NCAA Division I-AA Football Committee poll

1985 Southwestern Athletic Conference football standings
	Conf.					Overall
Team	W		L		T	W		L		T
No. 8 Grambling State +^	6	–	1	–	0	9	–	3	–	0
No. 15 Jackson State +^	6	–	1	–	0	8	–	3	–	0
Mississippi Valley State	5	–	2	–	0	8	–	3	–	0
No. 20 Alcorn State	5	–	2	–	0	7	–	3	–	0
Southern	3	–	4	–	0	6	–	5	–	0
Alabama State	2	–	5	–	0	3	–	8	–	0
Texas Southern	1	–	6	–	0	1	–	10	–	0
Prairie View A&M	0	–	7	–	0	2	–	9	–	0
+ – Conference co-champions; ^ – NCAA Division I-AA playoff participant; Rankings from NCAA Division I-AA Football Committee poll

1985 Yankee Conference football standings
	Conf.					Overall
Team	W		L		T	W		L		T
No. 7 Rhode Island $^	5	–	0	–	0	10	–	3	–	0
UMass	4	–	1	–	0	7	–	4	–	0
New Hampshire	2	–	3	–	0	6	–	4	–	0
Maine	2	–	3	–	0	6	–	5	–	0
Connecticut	1	–	4	–	0	4	–	5	–	0
Boston University	1	–	4	–	0	3	–	8	–	0
$ – Conference champion; ^ – NCAA Division I-AA playoff participant; Rankings from NCAA Division I-AA Football Committee poll

1985 NCAA Division I-AA independents football standings
	Conf.			Overall
Team	W	L	T	W		L		T
No. 9 Georgia Southern ^		–		13	–	2	–	0
No. 11 Eastern Washington ^		–		9	–	3	–	0
No. 18 Richmond		–		8	–	3	–	0
Colgate		–		7	–	3	–	1
Delaware		–		7	–	4	–	0
Tennessee State		–		7	–	4	–	0
No. 16 William & Mary		–		7	–	4	–	0
Lafayette		–		6	–	5	–	0
James Madison		–		5	–	6	–	0
Lehigh		–		5	–	6	–	0
Holy Cross		–		4	–	6	–	1
Florida A&M		–		4	–	7	–	0
Western Kentucky		–		4	–	7	–	0
Bucknell		–		3	–	7	–	0
Northeastern		–		2	–	8	–	0
^ – NCAA Division I-AA playoff participant; Rankings from NCAA Division I-AA Football Committee poll

== Conference champions ==
Conference Champions

Big Sky Conference – Idaho
Gateway Collegiate Athletic Conference – Northern Iowa
Gulf Star Conference – Stephen F. Austin and Sam Houston State
Ivy League – Penn
Mid-Eastern Athletic Conference – Delaware State
Ohio Valley Conference – Middle Tennessee State
Southern Conference – Furman Paladins
Southland Conference – Arkansas State
Southwestern Athletic Conference –Grambling and Jackson State
Yankee Conference – Rhode Island

== Postseason ==
=== NCAA Division I-AA playoff bracket ===
The top four teams were seeded, and received first-round byes.

First Round; November 30; Campus sites
Georgia Southern	27
Jackson State	0
Idaho	38
Eastern Washington	42
Rhode Island	35
Akron	27
Arkansas State	10
Grambling State	7

Quarterfinals; December 7 Campus sites
(1) Middle Tennessee	21
Georgia Southern	28
(4) Northern Iowa	17
Eastern Washington	14
(3) Furman	59
Rhode Island	15
(2) Nevada	24
Arkansas State	23

Semifinals; December 14; Campus sites
Georgia Southern	40
(4) Northern Iowa	33
(3) Furman	35
(2) Nevada	12

National Championship Game; December 21; Neutral Site
Georgia Southern	44
(3) Furman	42
