= 1985 New Hampshire Wildcats football team =

American college football season

1985 New Hampshire Wildcats football
- Conference: Yankee Conference
- Record: 6–4 (2–3 Yankee)
- Head coach: Bill Bowes (14th season)
- Home stadium: Cowell Stadium

1985 Yankee Conference football standings
	Conf.					Overall
Team	W		L		T	W		L		T
No. 7 Rhode Island $^	5	–	0	–	0	10	–	3	–	0
UMass	4	–	1	–	0	7	–	4	–	0
New Hampshire	2	–	3	–	0	6	–	4	–	0
Maine	2	–	3	–	0	6	–	5	–	0
Connecticut	1	–	4	–	0	4	–	5	–	0
Boston University	1	–	4	–	0	3	–	8	–	0
$ – Conference champion; ^ – NCAA Division I-AA playoff participant; Rankings from NCAA Division I-AA Football Committee poll

The 1985 New Hampshire Wildcats football team was an American football team that represented the University of New Hampshire as a member of the Yankee Conference during the 1985 NCAA Division I-AA football season. In its 14th year under head coach Bill Bowes, the team compiled a 6–4 record (2–3 against conference opponents) and tied for third place out of six teams in the Yankee Conference.

== Schedule ==
Date	Opponent	Rank	Site	Result	Attendance	Source
September 14	Lafayette*		Cowell Stadium; Durham, NH	L 7–20	10,126	
September 21	at Boston University		Nickerson Field; Boston, MA	W 27–13		
September 28	Dartmouth*		Cowell Stadium; Durham, NH (rivalry)	W 23–7	9,121	
October 5	at Connecticut		Memorial Stadium; Storrs, CT	W 10–8	3,798	
October 12	at Bucknell*		Memorial Stadium; Lewisburg, PA	W 58–0	7,900	
October 19	Lehigh*		Cowell Stadium; Durham, NH	W 31–17		
October 26	Northeastern*	No. 20	Cowell Stadium; Durham, NH	W 35–21		
November 2	at No. T–17 Rhode Island	No. 14	Meade Stadium; Kingston, RI	L 20–30	10,114	
November 9	at Maine		Alumni Field; Orono, ME (rivalry)	L 40–45		
November 16	UMass		Cowell Stadium; Durham, NH (rivalry)	L 17–21	8,419	
*Non-conference game; Rankings from NCAA Division I-AA Football Committee Poll released prior to the game
