= 1985 NCAA Division I-AA Football Championship Game =

Postseason college football game

1985 NCAA Division I-AA Football Championship
- I-AA National Championship Game; Diamond Bowl
Georgia Southern Eagles	Furman Paladins
(12–2)	(12–1)
Independent	SoCon
44	42
Head coach: Erk Russell	Head coach: Dick Sheridan
NCAA / Seed; 9 / –	NCAA / Seed; 2 (tie) / 3
	1	2	3	4	Total
Georgia Southern	0	6	22	16	44
Furman	7	14	7	14	42
- Date: December 21, 1985
- Season: 1985
- Stadium: Tacoma Dome
- Location: Tacoma, Washington
- Referee: Mike Standley
- Attendance: 5,306

United States TV coverage
- Network: ESPN
- Announcers: Mike Patrick (play-by-play), Sam Adkins (color)

The 1985 NCAA Division I-AA Football Championship Game was a postseason college football game between the Furman Paladins and the Georgia Southern Eagles. The game was played on December 21, 1985, at the Tacoma Dome in Tacoma, Washington. The culminating game of the 1985 NCAA Division I-AA football season, it was won by Georgia Southern, 44–42.

Contemporary news reports also referred to this game as the Diamond Bowl, as the NCAA had introduced Diamond Bowl branding for the Division I-AA championship game earlier in the year.

== Teams ==
The participants of the Championship Game were the finalists of the 1985 I-AA Playoffs, which began with a 12-team bracket.

=== Georgia Southern Eagles ===
Georgia Southern finished their regular season with a 9–2 record. Ranked ninth in the final NCAA I-AA in-house poll and unseeded in the tournament, the Eagles defeated Jackson State, top-seed Middle Tennessee State, and fourth-seed Northern Iowa to reach the final. This was the first appearance for Georgia Southern in a Division I-AA championship game.

=== Furman Paladins ===
Furman finished their regular season with a 10–1 record (6–0 in conference); one of their wins came against NC State, a Division I-A program, and their only defeat was an upset loss to Newberry, an NAIA program. Tied for second in the final NCAA I-AA in-house poll and seeded third in the tournament, the Paladins received a first-round bye then defeated Rhode Island and second-seed Nevada to reach the final. This was also the first appearance for Furman in a Division I-AA championship game.

== Game summary ==
Furman built a 28–6 lead with just under 11 minutes left in the third quarter. By the time that quarter had ended, Georgia Southern had fought back to tie the score, 28–28. The two teams traded touchdowns in the first half of the fourth quarter, remaining tied, 35–35. A Georgia Southern field goal was answered by a Furman touchdown, giving Furman a 42–38 lead with just over two minutes to play. Georgia Southern then staged a 72-yard drive in 82 seconds, scoring the winning touchdown with just 10 seconds left on the clock.

=== Scoring summary ===
Scoring summary

Quarter	Time	Drive			Team	Scoring information	Score	
Quarter	Time	Plays	Yards	TOP	Team	Scoring information	GSC	FUR
1	2:50	12	80	5:25	FUR	John Bagwell 1-yard touchdown run, Keven Esval kick good	0	7
2	13:33	10	61	4:17	GSC	44-yard field goal by Tim Foley	3	7
2	8:22	10	80	5:11	FUR	Bagwell 9-yard touchdown run, Esval kick good	3	14
2	3:08	10	69	5:14	GSC	33-yard field goal by Foley	6	14
2	0:56	7	98	2:12	FUR	Bobby Lamb 10-yard touchdown run, Esval kick good	6	21
3	10:57	5	74	2:34	FUR	Larry Grady 33-yard touchdown reception from Lamb, Esval kick good	6	28
3	6:51	8	96	4:06	GSC	Monte Sharpe 24-yard touchdown reception from Tracy Ham, 2-point run good by Ham	14	28
3	4:35	4	56	1:14	GSC	Patrick Sulley 40-yard touchdown reception from Ham, Foley kick good	21	28
3	2:28	3	59	1:00	GSC	Gerald Harris 52-yard touchdown run, Foley kick good	28	28
4	12:21	7	65	3:04	GSC	Patrick Sulley 12-yard touchdown reception from Ham, Foley kick good	35	28
4	7:51	11	99	4:30	FUR	Bagwell 7-yard touchdown run, Esval kick good	35	35
4	3:37	11	59	4:14	GSC	39-yard field goal by Foley	38	35
4	1:32	7	80	2:05	FUR	Bagwell 4-yard touchdown run, Esval kick good	38	42
4	0:10	8	72	1:22	GSC	Johnson 13-yard touchdown reception from Ham, Foley kick no good (wide right)	44	42
"TOP" = time of possession. For other American football terms, see Glossary of American football.							44	42

=== Game statistics ===
	1	2	3	4	Total
Eagles	0	6	22	16	44
Paladins	7	14	7	14	42

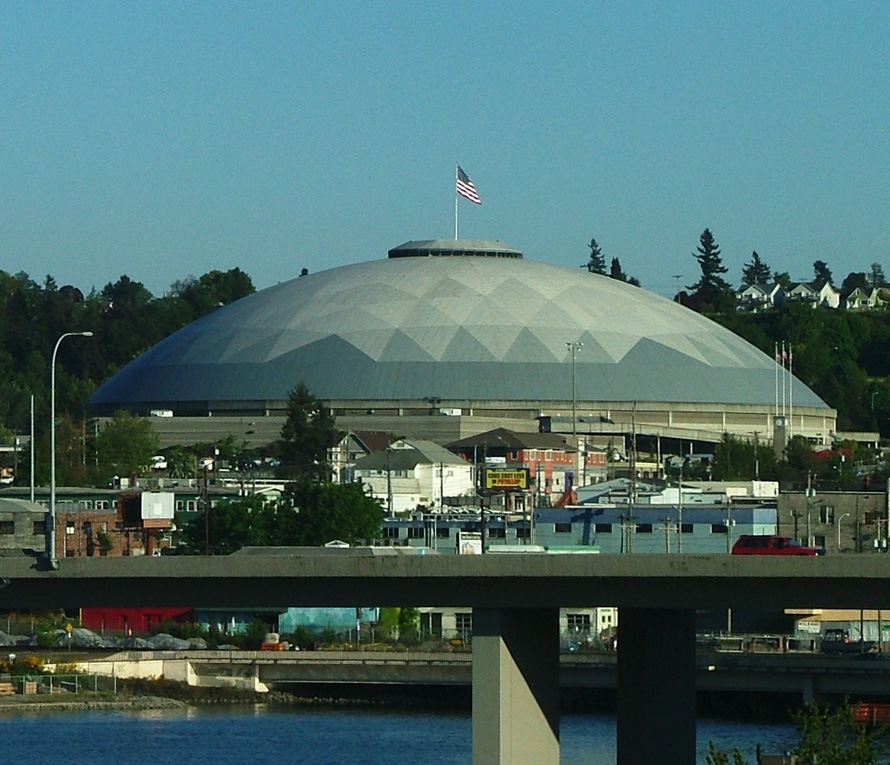
Tacoma Dome, site of the 1985 Division I-AA championship game

Statistics	GSC	FUR
First downs	28	28
Plays–yards	77–640	67–498
Rushes–yards	40–221	45–288
Passing yards	419	210
Passing: comp–att–int	23–37–1	14–22–0
Time of possession	31:33	28:27

Team	Category	Player	Statistics
Georgia Southern	Passing	Tracy Ham	23–37, 419 yds, 4 TD, 1 INT
Georgia Southern	Rushing	Gerald Harris	10 car, 92 yds, 1 TD
Georgia Southern	Receiving	Patrick Sulley	7 rec, 148 yds, 2 TD
Furman	Passing	Bobby Lamb	14–22, 210 yds, 1 TD
Furman	Rushing	John Bagwell	15 car, 73 yds, 4 TD
Furman	Receiving	Larry Grady	3 rec, 67 yds, 1 TD
