= 1985 Holy Cross Crusaders football team =

American college football season

1985 Holy Cross Crusaders football
- Conference: Independent
- Record: 4–6–1
- Head coach: Rick E. Carter (5th season)
- Defensive coordinator: Mark Duffner (5th season)
- Captains: Leo Carlin; Ed Kutschke; Tom Patton
- Home stadium: Fitton Field

1985 NCAA Division I-AA independents football standings
	Conf.			Overall
Team	W	L	T	W		L		T
No. 9 Georgia Southern ^		–		13	–	2	–	0
No. 11 Eastern Washington ^		–		9	–	3	–	0
No. 18 Richmond		–		8	–	3	–	0
Colgate		–		7	–	3	–	1
Delaware		–		7	–	4	–	0
Tennessee State		–		7	–	4	–	0
No. 16 William & Mary		–		7	–	4	–	0
Lafayette		–		6	–	5	–	0
James Madison		–		5	–	6	–	0
Lehigh		–		5	–	6	–	0
Holy Cross		–		4	–	6	–	1
Florida A&M		–		4	–	7	–	0
Western Kentucky		–		4	–	7	–	0
Bucknell		–		3	–	7	–	0
Northeastern		–		2	–	8	–	0
^ – NCAA Division I-AA playoff participant; Rankings from NCAA Division I-AA Football Committee poll

The 1985 Holy Cross Crusaders football team was an American football team that represented the College of the Holy Cross during the 1985 NCAA Division I-AA football season.

In their fifth and final year under head coach Rick E. Carter, the Crusaders compiled an 4–6–1 record. Leo Carlin, Ed Kutschke and Tom Patton were the team captains.

The Crusaders were briefly ranked in the national top 20, claiming No. 20 in the poll released Oct. 8. They fell out of the rankings after that week, and were not ranked at season's end.

This would be Holy Cross' final year as an independent, before joining the Colonial League. Colgate was the only future league football opponent on the Crusaders' 1985 schedule. The league was later renamed Patriot League, and continues to be Holy Cross' home conference as of 2025.

Holy Cross played its home games at Fitton Field on the college campus in Worcester, Massachusetts.

== Schedule ==
Date	Opponent	Site	Result	Attendance	Source
September 14	Colgate	Fitton Field; Worcester, MA	W 24–21	16,211	
September 21	at UMass	Alumni Stadium; Hadley, MA	L 3–27	13,814	
September 28	Delaware^{†}	Fitton Field; Worcester, MA	W 22–6	16,111	
October 5	at Dartmouth	Memorial Field; Hanover, NH	W 17–14	3,100	
October 12	at Yale	Yale Bowl; New Haven, CT	L 15–19	22,439	
October 19	at Connecticut	Memorial Stadium; Storrs, CT	L 2–22	5,677	
October 26	Brown^	Fitton Field; Worcester, MA	T 20–20	15,461	
November 2	at Army	Michie Stadium; West Point, NY	L 12–34	40,236	
November 9	Harvard	Fitton Field; Worcester, MA	L 20–28	14,697	
November 16	Boston University	Fitton Field; Worcester, MA	W 30–9		
November 23	at Boston College	Alumni Stadium; Chestnut Hill, MA	L 7–38	32,000	
^{†}Homecoming; ^ Family Weekend
