= 1985 Colgate Red Raiders football team =

American college football season

1985 Colgate Red Raiders football
- Conference: Independent
- Record: 7–3–1
- Head coach: Frederick Dunlap (10th season)
- Captains: Tom Burgess; Bill Hecht
- Home stadium: Andy Kerr Stadium

1985 NCAA Division I-AA independents football standings
	Conf.			Overall
Team	W	L	T	W		L		T
No. 9 Georgia Southern ^		–		13	–	2	–	0
No. 11 Eastern Washington ^		–		9	–	3	–	0
No. 18 Richmond		–		8	–	3	–	0
Colgate		–		7	–	3	–	1
Delaware		–		7	–	4	–	0
Tennessee State		–		7	–	4	–	0
No. 16 William & Mary		–		7	–	4	–	0
Lafayette		–		6	–	5	–	0
James Madison		–		5	–	6	–	0
Lehigh		–		5	–	6	–	0
Holy Cross		–		4	–	6	–	1
Florida A&M		–		4	–	7	–	0
Western Kentucky		–		4	–	7	–	0
Bucknell		–		3	–	7	–	0
Northeastern		–		2	–	8	–	0
^ – NCAA Division I-AA playoff participant; Rankings from NCAA Division I-AA Football Committee poll

The 1985 Colgate Red Raiders football team was an American football team that represented Colgate University during the 1985 NCAA Division I-AA football season.

In its tenth season under head coach Frederick Dunlap, the team compiled an 7–3–1 record. Tom Burgess and Bill Hecht were the team captains.

The Red Raiders spent four weeks in the national top 20 rankings, reaching as high as No. 14, but fell out of the rankings by season's end.

This would be Colgate's final year as an independent, before joining the Colonial League. Future league football opponents on the Red Raiders' 1985 schedule included Lafayette, Lehigh and Holy Cross. The league was later renamed Patriot League, and continues to be Colgate's home conference as of 2020.

The team played its home games at Andy Kerr Stadium in Hamilton, New York.

== Schedule ==
Date	Opponent	Rank	Site	Result	Attendance	Source
September 14	at Holy Cross		Fitton Field; Worcester, MA	L 21–24	16,211	
September 21	at Lafayette		Fisher Field; Easton, PA	W 30–14	11,500	
September 28	at Cornell		Schoellkopf Field; Ithaca, NY (rivalry)	W 21–20	12,300	
October 5	Lehigh		Andy Kerr Stadium; Hamilton, NY	W 32–14	5,100	
October 12	at Dartmouth		Memorial Field; Hanover, NH	W 54–28	9,434	
October 19	at Princeton	No. T–19	Palmer Stadium; Princeton, NJ	W 49–44	8,795	
October 26	at Army	No. 16	Michie Stadium; West Point, NY	L 43–45	40,063	
November 2	Columbia		Andy Kerr Stadium; Hamilton, NY	W 55–11	6,300	
November 9	No. 17 Penn	No. 14	Andy Kerr Stadium; Hamilton, NY	T 27–27	5,000	
November 16	at Rutgers	No. 17	Rutgers Stadium; Piscataway, NJ	L 14–28	6,500	
November 23	at Boston University		Nickerson Field; Boston, MA	W 48–37	2,485	
Rankings from NCAA Division I-AA Football Committee Poll released prior to the game
