= 1985 Eastern Kentucky Colonels football team =

American college football season

1985 Eastern Kentucky Colonels football
- Conference: Ohio Valley Conference
- Record: 8–3 (5–2 OVC)
- Head coach: Roy Kidd (22nd season)
- Home stadium: Hanger Field

1985 Ohio Valley Conference football standings
	Conf.					Overall
Team	W		L		T	W		L		T
No. 1 Middle Tennessee $^	7	–	0	–	0	11	–	1	–	0
No. 10 Akron ^	5	–	2	–	0	8	–	4	–	0
No. 17 Murray State	5	–	2	–	0	7	–	3	–	1
No. 19 Eastern Kentucky	5	–	2	–	0	8	–	3	–	0
Youngstown State	4	–	3	–	0	5	–	6	–	0
Austin Peay	2	–	5	–	0	5	–	6	–	0
Tennessee Tech	1	–	6	–	0	1	–	10	–	0
Morehead State	0	–	7	–	0	1	–	10	–	0
$ – Conference champion; ^ – NCAA Division I-AA playoff participant; Rankings from NCAA Division I-AA Football Committee poll

The 1985 Eastern Kentucky Colonels football team represented Eastern Kentucky University as a member of the Ohio Valley Conference (OVC) during the 1985 NCAA Division I-AA football season. Led by 22nd-year head coach Roy Kidd, the Colonels compiled an overall record of 8–3, with a mark of 5–2 in conference play, and finished tied for second in the OVC.

== Schedule ==
Date	Opponent	Rank	Site	Result	Attendance	Source
September 7	Akron		Hanger Field; Richmond, KY	W 16–6	11,800	
September 21	Marshall*		Hanger Field; Richmond, KY	L 7–13	14,200	
September 28	at Youngstown State		Stambaugh Stadium; Youngstown, OH	W 36–29	8,910	
October 4	Austin Peay	No. 19	Hanger Field; Richmond, KY	W 20–10	12,200	
October 12	at No. T–4 Middle Tennessee	No. T–17	Johnny "Red" Floyd Stadium; Murfreesboro, TN	L 14–28	13,250	
October 19	at UCF*		Florida Citrus Bowl; Orlando, FL	W 28–21	8,223	
October 26	Western Kentucky*		Hanger Field; Richmond, KY (rivalry)	W 51–21	19,400	
November 2	at No. 16 Murray State	No. T–17	Roy Stewart Stadium; Murray, KY	L 20–27	8,500	
November 9	Tennessee Tech		Hanger Field; Richmond, KY	W 35–17		
November 16	at Morehead State		Jayne Stadium; Morehead, KY (rivalry)	W 26–0		
November 23	at Louisville*		Cardinal Stadium; Louisville, KY	W 45–21	30,113	
*Non-conference game; Rankings from NCAA Division I-AA Football Committee Poll released prior to the game
