= 1985 UMass Minutemen football team =

American college football season

1985 UMass Minutemen football
- Conference: Yankee Conference
- Record: 7–4 (4–1 Yankee)
- Head coach: Bob Stull (2nd season)
- Defensive coordinator: Jim Reid (8th season)
- Home stadium: Warren McGuirk Alumni Stadium

1985 Yankee Conference football standings
	Conf.					Overall
Team	W		L		T	W		L		T
No. 7 Rhode Island $^	5	–	0	–	0	10	–	3	–	0
UMass	4	–	1	–	0	7	–	4	–	0
New Hampshire	2	–	3	–	0	6	–	4	–	0
Maine	2	–	3	–	0	6	–	5	–	0
Connecticut	1	–	4	–	0	4	–	5	–	0
Boston University	1	–	4	–	0	3	–	8	–	0
$ – Conference champion; ^ – NCAA Division I-AA playoff participant; Rankings from NCAA Division I-AA Football Committee poll

The 1985 UMass Minutemen football team represented the University of Massachusetts Amherst in the 1985 NCAA Division I-AA football season as a member of the Yankee Conference. The team was coached by Bob Stull and played its home games at Warren McGuirk Alumni Stadium in Hadley, Massachusetts. The 1985 season was notable as it was Bob Stull's last as coach of the Minutemen, as Stull left after the season to become the head coach at UTEP. UMass finished the season with a record of 7–4 overall and 4–1 in conference play.

== Schedule ==
Date	Opponent	Rank	Site	Result	Attendance	Source
September 7	Morgan State*		McGuirk Stadium; Hadley, MA	W 38–9	11,918	
September 14	at Richmond*		UR Stadium; Richmond, VA	L 14–19	14,068	
September 21	Holy Cross*		McGuirk Stadium; Hadley, MA	W 27–3	13,814	
September 28	at Harvard*	No. 17	Harvard Stadium; Boston, MA	L 3–10	15,000	
October 5	Rhode Island		McGuirk Stadium; Hadley, MA	L 3–7	6,871	
October 12	at Northeastern*		Parsons Field; Brookline, MA	W 10–7	5,100	
October 19	Maine		McGuirk Stadium; Hadley, MA	W 20–7	5,644	
October 26	Boston University		McGuirk Stadium; Hadley, MA	W 17–14	11,072	
November 2	at Connecticut		Memorial Stadium; Storrs, CT (rivalry)	W 21–7	11,340	
November 9	No. T–17 Delaware*		McGuirk Stadium; Hadley, MA	L 24–27	9,121	
November 16	at New Hampshire		Cowell Stadium; Durham, NH (rivalry)	W 21–17	8,419	
*Non-conference game; Rankings from NCAA Division I-AA Football Committee Poll released prior to the game
