= 1985 Delaware State Hornets football team =

American college football season

1985 Delaware State Hornets football

MEAC champion
- Conference: Mid-Eastern Athletic Conference
- Record: 9–2 (4–0 MEAC)
- Head coach: Bill Collick (1st season)
- Home stadium: Alumni Stadium

1985 Mid-Eastern Athletic Conference football standings
	Conf.					Overall
Team	W		L		T	W		L		T
No. T–12 Delaware State $	4	–	0	–	0	9	–	2	–	0
Bethune–Cookman	3	–	1	–	0	6	–	4	–	0
South Carolina State	2	–	2	–	0	5	–	6	–	0
North Carolina A&T	1	–	3	–	0	6	–	5	–	0
Howard	0	–	4	–	0	4	–	7	–	0
Morgan State	0	–	0	–	0	0	–	9	–	0
$ – Conference champion; Morgan State games did not count as conference games. Morgan State was classified as NCAA Division II. All the other teams were I-AA.; Rankings from NCAA Division I-AA Football Committee poll

The 1985 Delaware State Hornets football team represented Delaware State College (now known as Delaware State University) as a member of the Mid-Eastern Athletic Conference (MEAC) during the 1985 NCAA Division I-AA football season. Led by first-year head coach Bill Collick, the Hornets compiled an overall record of 9–2, with a mark of 4–0 in conference play, and finished as MEAC champion.

== Schedule ==
Date	Opponent	Rank	Site	Result	Attendance	Source
August 31	Morgan State*		Alumni Stadium; Dover, DE	W 35–0	4,500	
September 7	vs. North Carolina A&T		Franklin Field; Philadelphia, PA	W 30–16	10,500	
September 14	at South Carolina State		Oliver C. Dawson Stadium; Orangeburg, SC	W 38–20	6,143	
September 21	Saint Paul's (VA)*		Alumni Stadium; Dover, DE	W 46–6		
September 28	at Northern Iowa*	No. 8	UNI-Dome; Cedar Falls, IA	L 17–37	12,100	
October 5	Bethune–Cookman^{†}	No. 17	Alumni Stadium; Dover, DE	W 51–7	8,500	
October 12	at Connecticut*	No. 16	Memorial Stadium; Storrs, CT	W 24–14	5,838	
October 26	at Towson State*	No. 9	Minnegan Stadium; Towson, MD	L 26–51	3,983	
November 9	at Southern*	No. T–17	A. W. Mumford Stadium; Baton Rouge, LA	W 46–8	22,500	
November 16	at Northeastern*	No. 15	Parsons Field; Brookline, MA	W 36–6	2,500	
November 23	Howard	No. 12	Alumni Stadium; Dover, DE	W 38–16	6,300	
*Non-conference game; ^{†}Homecoming; Rankings from NCAA Division I-AA Football Committee Poll released prior to the game
