= 1985 Cornell Big Red football team =

American college football season

1985 Cornell Big Red football
- Conference: Ivy League
- Record: 3–7 (2–5 Ivy)
- Head coach: Maxie Baughan (3rd season)
- Captains: Stuart Mitchell; John Tagliaferri; Dave Van Metre
- Home stadium: Schoellkopf Field

1985 Ivy League football standings
	Conf.					Overall
Team	W		L		T	W		L		T
Penn $	6	–	1	–	0	7	–	2	–	1
Harvard	5	–	2	–	0	7	–	3	–	0
Princeton	5	–	2	–	0	5	–	5	–	0
Brown	4	–	3	–	0	5	–	4	–	1
Yale	3	–	3	–	1	4	–	4	–	1
Dartmouth	2	–	4	–	1	2	–	7	–	1
Cornell	2	–	5	–	0	3	–	7	–	0
Columbia	0	–	7	–	0	0	–	10	–	0
$ – Conference champion

The 1985 Cornell Big Red football team was an American football team that represented Cornell University during the 1985 NCAA Division I-AA football season. Cornell finished second-to-last in the Ivy League.

In its third season under head coach Maxie Baughan, the team compiled a 3–7 record and was outscored 178 to 157. Stuart Mitchell, John Tagliaferri and Dave Van Metre were the team captains. The second win of the year, at Yale on November 9, was the 500th victory in the history of Cornell football.

Cornell's 2–5 conference record placed seventh in the Ivy League standings. The Big Red outscored Ivy opponents 127 to 108.

Cornell played its home games at Schoellkopf Field in Ithaca, New York.

== Schedule ==
Date	Opponent	Site	Result	Attendance	Source
September 21	at Penn	Franklin Field; Philadelphia, PA (rivalry)	L 6–10	21,027	
September 28	Colgate*	Schoellkopf Field; Ithaca, NY (rivalry)	L 20–21	12,300	
October 5	Lafayette*	Schoellkopf Field; Ithaca, NY	L 3–17	10,008	
October 12	Harvard	Schoellkopf Field; Ithaca, NY	L 17–20	15,300	
October 19	at Brown	Brown Stadium; Providence, RI	L 0–22	9,800	
October 26	Dartmouth^{†}	Schoellkopf Field; Ithaca, NY	L 17–20	16,000	
November 2	at Bucknell*	Memorial Stadium; Lewisburg, PA	W 26–13	2,260	
November 9	at Yale	Yale Bowl; New Haven, CT	W 20–14	19,029	
November 16	Columbia	Schoellkopf Field; Ithaca, NY (rivalry)	W 21–8	1,000	
November 23	at Princeton	Palmer Stadium; Princeton, NJ	L 27–33	8,917	
*Non-conference game; ^{†}Homecoming
