= 1985 Penn Quakers football team =

American college football season

1985 Penn Quakers football

Ivy League champion
- Conference: Ivy League
- Record: 7–2–1 (6–1 Ivy)
- Head coach: Jerry Berndt (5th season)
- Captains: Tom Gilmore; Jeff Goyette
- Home stadium: Franklin Field

1985 Ivy League football standings
	Conf.					Overall
Team	W		L		T	W		L		T
Penn $	6	–	1	–	0	7	–	2	–	1
Harvard	5	–	2	–	0	7	–	3	–	0
Princeton	5	–	2	–	0	5	–	5	–	0
Brown	4	–	3	–	0	5	–	4	–	1
Yale	3	–	3	–	1	4	–	4	–	1
Dartmouth	2	–	4	–	1	2	–	7	–	1
Cornell	2	–	5	–	0	3	–	7	–	0
Columbia	0	–	7	–	0	0	–	10	–	0
$ – Conference champion

The 1985 Penn Quakers football team represented the University of Pennsylvania in the 1985 NCAA Division I-AA football season.

== Schedule ==
Date	Opponent	Rank	Site	Result	Attendance	Source
September 21	at Cornell		Schoellkopf Field; Ithaca, NY (rivalry)	W 10–6	21,027	
September 28	Army*		Franklin Field; Philadelphia, PA	L 3–41	23,765	
October 5	at Columbia		Wien Stadium; New York, NY	W 46–14	4,272	
October 12	Brown		Franklin Field; Philadelphia, PA	W 17–14	25,285	
October 19	at Davidson*		Richardson Stadium; Davidson, NC	W 15–0	3,000	
October 26	at Yale		Yale Bowl; New Haven, CT	W 23–0	23,449	
November 2	Princeton		Franklin Field; Philadelphia, PA (rivalry)	W 31–21	33,479	
November 9	at Colgate*	No. T–17	Andy Kerr Stadium; Hamilton, NY	T 27–27	5,000	
November 16	at Harvard		Harvard Stadium; Boston, MA (rivalry)	L 6–17	18,040	
November 23	Dartmouth		Franklin Field; Philadelphia, PA	W 19–14	19,802	
*Non-conference game; Rankings from NCAA Division I-AA Football Committee Poll released prior to the game

== Roster ==
1985 Penn Quakers football team roster
Players			Coaches
Offense: Pos. / # / Name / Class; QB / 7 / Jim Crocicchia / Jr	Defense: Pos. / # / Name / Class	Special teams: Pos. / # / Name / Class	Head coach: Jerry Berndt; Coordinators/assistant coaches Legend: (C) Team captain; (S) Suspended; (I) Ineligible; Injured; Redshirt
