= 1985 Rhode Island Rams football team =

American college football season

1985 Rhode Island Rams football

Yankee champion Lambert Cup

NCAA Division I-AA Quarterfinal, L 15–59 at Furman
- Conference: Yankee Conference
- Record: 10–3 (5–0 Yankee)
- Head coach: Bob Griffin (10th season)
- Defensive coordinator: Pete Adrian (10th season)
- Home stadium: Meade Stadium

1985 Yankee Conference football standings
	Conf.					Overall
Team	W		L		T	W		L		T
No. 7 Rhode Island $^	5	–	0	–	0	10	–	3	–	0
UMass	4	–	1	–	0	7	–	4	–	0
New Hampshire	2	–	3	–	0	6	–	4	–	0
Maine	2	–	3	–	0	6	–	5	–	0
Connecticut	1	–	4	–	0	4	–	5	–	0
Boston University	1	–	4	–	0	3	–	8	–	0
$ – Conference champion; ^ – NCAA Division I-AA playoff participant; Rankings from NCAA Division I-AA Football Committee poll

The 1985 Rhode Island Rams football team was an American football team that represented the University of Rhode Island in the Yankee Conference during the 1985 NCAA Division I-AA football season. In their 10th season under head coach Bob Griffin, the Rams compiled a 10–3 record (5–0 against conference opponents), won the conference championship, and lost to Furman in the NCAA Division I-AA Quarterfinals. They also received the Division I-AA Lambert Cup for 1985.

Quarterback Tom Ehrhardt, a transfer from C.W. Post, broke New England records by completing 365 of 645 passes for 4,508 yards and 42 touchdowns. He was chosen as the Yankee Conference Player of the Year in 1985. He is the only Rhode Island player to have his number retired.

Erhardt, tight end Brian Forster and offensive tackle Bob White received first-team honors from the Associated Press on the 1985 All-New England college football team. Three others received second-team honors: wide receiver Dameon Reilly, defensive tackle Ted Moskala, and defensive back Ray Wiliams. Defensive back Mike Cassidy was named to the third team.

The team played its home games at Meade Stadium in Kingston, Rhode Island.

== Schedule ==
Date	Opponent	Rank	Site	Result	Attendance	Source
September 7	at Delaware*		Delaware Stadium; Newark, DE	L 13–29	15,465	
September 14	Howard*		Meade Stadium; Kingston, RI	W 46–0	6,628	
September 21	Maine		Meade Stadium; Kingston, RI	W 34–14	9,442	
September 28	at Brown*	No. 15	Brown Stadium; Providence, RI (rivalry)	L 27–32	10,399	
October 5	at UMass		McGuirk Stadium; Hadley, MA	W 7–3	6,871	
October 12	at Lehigh*		Taylor Stadium; Bethlehem, PA	W 45–38	13,500	
October 19	at Boston University		Nickerson Field; Boston, MA	W 34–19	4,164	
October 26	Lafayette*^{†}		Meade Stadium; Kingston, RI	W 41–19	12,933	
November 2	No. 14 New Hampshire	No. T–17	Meade Stadium; Kingston, RI	W 30–20	10,114	
November 9	Northeastern*	No. 12	Meade Stadium; Kingston, RI	W 34–21	9,421	
November 16	Connecticut	No. 7	Meade Stadium; Kingston, RI	W 56–42	8,897	
November 30	No. 10 Akron*	No. 7	Meade Stadium; Kingston, RI (NCAA Division I-AA First Round)	W 35–27	7,317	
December 7	at No T–2 Furman*	No. 7	Paladin Stadium; Greenville, SC (NCAA Division I-AA Quarterfinal)	L 15–59	9,454	
*Non-conference game; ^{†}Homecoming; Rankings from NCAA Division I-AA Football Committee Poll released prior to the game
