= 1985 Akron Zips football team =

American college football season

1985 Akron Zips football

NCAA Division I-AA First Round, L 27–35 vs. Rhode Island
- Conference: Ohio Valley Conference
- Record: 8–4 (5–2 OVC)
- Head coach: Jim Dennison (13th season)
- Captain: Gary Kalis; Steve Rafac; Tim Wallace
- Home stadium: Rubber Bowl

1985 Ohio Valley Conference football standings
	Conf.					Overall
Team	W		L		T	W		L		T
No. 1 Middle Tennessee $^	7	–	0	–	0	11	–	1	–	0
No. 10 Akron ^	5	–	2	–	0	8	–	4	–	0
No. 17 Murray State	5	–	2	–	0	7	–	3	–	1
No. 19 Eastern Kentucky	5	–	2	–	0	8	–	3	–	0
Youngstown State	4	–	3	–	0	5	–	6	–	0
Austin Peay	2	–	5	–	0	5	–	6	–	0
Tennessee Tech	1	–	6	–	0	1	–	10	–	0
Morehead State	0	–	7	–	0	1	–	10	–	0
$ – Conference champion; ^ – NCAA Division I-AA playoff participant; Rankings from NCAA Division I-AA Football Committee poll

The 1985 Akron Zips football team represented Akron University in the 1985 NCAA Division I-AA football season as members of the Ohio Valley Conference. They were led by thirteenth-year head coach Jim Dennison, in his final season with the Zips. The Zips played their home games at the Rubber Bowl in Akron, Ohio. They finished the season with a record of 8–4 overall and 5–2 in OVC play to tie for second place.

== Schedule ==
Date	Opponent	Rank	Site	Result	Attendance	Source
September 7	at Eastern Kentucky		Hanger Field; Richmond, KY	L 6–16	11,800	
September 14	Kent State*		Rubber Bowl; Akron, OH (Wagon Wheel)	W 24–0	32,183	
September 21	Eastern Michigan*		Rubber Bowl; Akron, OH	W 16–12	12,236	
September 28	at Bowling Green*		Doyt Perry Stadium; Bowling Green, OH	L 22–27	25,000	
October 5	at Western Kentucky*		L. T. Smith Stadium; Bowling Green, KY	W 34–32	23,984	
October 12	No. 6 Murray State		Rubber Bowl; Akron, OH	W 17–10	8,903	
October 19	at Morehead State	No. 18	Jayne Stadium; Morehead, KY	W 38–9	5,500	
November 2	at Tennessee Tech	No. 13	Tucker Stadium; Cookeville, TN	W 27–9		
November 9	Youngstown State	No. T–9	Rubber Bowl; Akron, OH (Steel Tire)	W 30–5	16,001	
November 16	No. 1 Middle Tennessee	No. T–7	Rubber Bowl; Akron, OH	L 0–17		
November 23	at Austin Peay	No. 13	Clarksville Municipal Stadium; Clarksville, TN	W 17–14		
November 30	at No. 7 Rhode Island*	No. 10	Meade Stadium; Kingston, RI (NCAA Division I-AA First Round)	L 27–35	7,317	
*Non-conference game; Rankings from NCAA Division I-AA Football Committee Poll released prior to the game
