= 1985 Columbia Lions football team =

American college football season

1985 Columbia Lions football
- Conference: Ivy League
- Record: 0–10 (0–7 Ivy)
- Head coach: Jim Garrett (1st season)
- Captain: Bill Strack
- Home stadium: Wien Stadium

1985 Ivy League football standings
	Conf.					Overall
Team	W		L		T	W		L		T
Penn $	6	–	1	–	0	7	–	2	–	1
Harvard	5	–	2	–	0	7	–	3	–	0
Princeton	5	–	2	–	0	5	–	5	–	0
Brown	4	–	3	–	0	5	–	4	–	1
Yale	3	–	3	–	1	4	–	4	–	1
Dartmouth	2	–	4	–	1	2	–	7	–	1
Cornell	2	–	5	–	0	3	–	7	–	0
Columbia	0	–	7	–	0	0	–	10	–	0
$ – Conference champion

The 1985 Columbia Lions football team was an American football team that represented Columbia University during the 1985 NCAA Division I-AA football season. Amid a record-setting loss streak, Columbia finished last in the Ivy League.

In their first and only season under head coach Jim Garrett, the Lions compiled an 0–10 record and were outscored 333 to 75. Bill Strack was the team captain.

The Lions' winless (0–7) conference record was the worst in the Ivy League standings. Columbia was outscored 243 to 54 by Ivy opponents.

By losing all of their games in 1985, the Lions extended a winless streak and a losing streak that began in 1983. They would not win or tie another game until an October 9, 1988, win against Princeton, an NCAA Division I record streak at the time. At the end of 1985, the streak stood at 24 games without a win, and 21 straight losses.

Columbia played its homes games at Lawrence A. Wien Stadium in Upper Manhattan, in New York City.

== Schedule ==
Date	Opponent	Site	Result	Attendance	Source
September 21	at Harvard	Harvard Stadium; Boston, MA	L 17–49	7,921	
September 28	at Lafayette*	Fisher Field; Easton, PA	L 0–20	3,500	
October 5	Penn	Wien Stadium; New York, NY	L 14–46	4,272	
October 12	at Princeton	Palmer Stadium; Princeton, NJ	L 0–31	7,080	
October 19	Yale^{†}	Wien Stadium; New York, NY	L 12–28	6,719	
October 26	Bucknell*	Wien Stadium; New York, NY	L 10–13	2,420	
November 2	at Colgate*	Andy Kerr Stadium; Hamilton, NY	L 11–55	6,300	
November 9	Dartmouth	Wien Stadium; New York, NY	L 3–34	6,013	
November 16	at Cornell	Schoellkopf Field; Ithaca, NY (rivalry)	L 8–21	1,000	
November 23	at Brown	Brown Stadium; Providence, RI	L 0–34	4,250	
*Non-conference game; ^{†}Homecoming
