= 1985 Connecticut Huskies football team =

American college football season

1985 Connecticut Huskies football
- Conference: Yankee Conference
- Record: 4–5 (1–4 Yankee)
- Head coach: Tom Jackson (3rd season)
- Home stadium: Memorial Stadium

1985 Yankee Conference football standings
| | Conf. | | | | | Overall |
| Team | W | | L | | T | W | | L | | T |
|---|---|---|---|---|---|---|---|---|---|---|
| No. 7 Rhode Island $^ | 5 | – | 0 | – | 0 | 10 | – | 3 | – | 0 |
| UMass | 4 | – | 1 | – | 0 | 7 | – | 4 | – | 0 |
| New Hampshire | 2 | – | 3 | – | 0 | 6 | – | 4 | – | 0 |
| Maine | 2 | – | 3 | – | 0 | 6 | – | 5 | – | 0 |
| Connecticut | 1 | – | 4 | – | 0 | 4 | – | 5 | – | 0 |
| Boston University | 1 | – | 4 | – | 0 | 3 | – | 8 | – | 0 |
$ – Conference champion; ^ – NCAA Division I-AA playoff participant; Rankings from NCAA Division I-AA Football Committee poll

The 1985 Connecticut Huskies football team represented the University of Connecticut in the 1985 NCAA Division I-AA football season. The Huskies were led by third year head coach Tom Jackson, and completed the season with a record of 4–5.

== Schedule ==
| Date | Opponent | Site | Result | Attendance | Source |
|---|---|---|---|---|---|
| September 14 | Northeastern* | Memorial Stadium; Storrs, CT | W 27–13 | 6,235 | |
| September 21 | at Lehigh* | Taylor Stadium; Bethlehem, PA | W 28–24 | 9,500 | |
| October 5 | New Hampshire | Memorial Stadium; Storrs, CT | L 8–10 | 3,798 | |
| October 12 | No. 16 Delaware State* | Memorial Stadium; Storrs, CT | L 14–24 | 5,838 | |
| October 19 | Holy Cross* | Memorial Stadium; Storrs, CT | W 22–2 | 5,677 | |
| October 26 | at Maine | Alumni Field; Orono, ME | L 3–28 | | |
| November 2 | UMass | Memorial Stadium; Storrs, CT (rivalry) | L 7–21 | 11,340 | |
| November 9 | at Boston University | Nickerson Field; Boston, MA | W 24–3 | | |
| November 16 | at No. 7 Rhode Island | Meade Stadium; Kingston, RI (rivalry) | L 42–56 | 8,897 | |
*Non-conference game; Rankings from NCAA Division I-AA Football Committee Poll released prior to the game
