= 1985 William & Mary Tribe football team =

American college football season

1985 William & Mary Tribe football
- Conference: Independent
- Record: 7–4
- Head coach: Jimmye Laycock (6th season)
- Captains: Bob Solderitch; Todd Leeson; Graeme Miller
- Home stadium: Cary Field

1985 NCAA Division I-AA independents football standings
	Conf.			Overall
Team	W	L	T	W		L		T
No. 9 Georgia Southern ^		–		13	–	2	–	0
No. 11 Eastern Washington ^		–		9	–	3	–	0
No. 18 Richmond		–		8	–	3	–	0
Colgate		–		7	–	3	–	1
Delaware		–		7	–	4	–	0
Tennessee State		–		7	–	4	–	0
No. 16 William & Mary		–		7	–	4	–	0
Lafayette		–		6	–	5	–	0
James Madison		–		5	–	6	–	0
Lehigh		–		5	–	6	–	0
Holy Cross		–		4	–	6	–	1
Florida A&M		–		4	–	7	–	0
Western Kentucky		–		4	–	7	–	0
Bucknell		–		3	–	7	–	0
Northeastern		–		2	–	8	–	0
^ – NCAA Division I-AA playoff participant; Rankings from NCAA Division I-AA Football Committee poll

The 1985 William & Mary Tribe football team represented the College of William & Mary as an independent during the 1985 NCAA Division I-AA football season. Led by Jimmye Laycock in his sixth year as head coach, William & Mary finished the season with a record of 7–4 and ranked No. 16 in the final NCAA Division I-AA Football Committee poll.

== Schedule ==
Date	Opponent	Rank	Site	Result	Attendance	Source
September 7	at Wake Forest		Groves Stadium; Winston-Salem, NC	L 23–30	22,300	
September 14	Norfolk State		Cary Field; Williamsburg, VA	W 28–15	15,000	
September 21	Delaware		Cary Field; Williamsburg, VA (rivalry)	W 17–16	11,500	
September 28	James Madison	No. 7	Cary Field; Williamsburg, VA (rivalry)	W 31–14	12,200	
October 5	at Harvard	No. 5	Harvard Stadium; Boston, MA	W 21–14	6,500	
October 12	at Virginia Tech	No. T–4	Lane Stadium; Blacksburg, VA	L 10–40	38,700	
October 19	at Temple	No. 12	Veterans Stadium; Philadelphia, PA	L 16–45	15,186	
October 26	at VMI		Alumni Memorial Field; Lexington, VA (rivalry)	L 38–39	5,700	
November 2	at Lehigh		Taylor Stadium; Bethlehem, PA	W 31–29	10,800	
November 9	at Princeton		Palmer Stadium; Princeton, NJ	W 33–28	6,738	
November 16	No. 9 Richmond		Cary Field; Williamsburg, VA (I-64 Bowl)	W 28–17	17,301	
Rankings from NCAA Division I-AA Football Committee Poll released prior to the game
