= 1985 Georgia Southern Eagles football team =

American college football season

1985 Georgia Southern Eagles football

NCAA Division I-AA champion

NCAA Division I-AA Championship, W 44–42 vs. Furman
- Conference: Independent

Ranking
- AP: No. 9
- Record: 13–2
- Head coach: Erk Russell (4th season)
- Offensive coordinator: Paul Johnson (1st season)
- Offensive scheme: Option
- Defensive coordinator: Len Gravelson (1st season)
- Base defense: 4–4
- Home stadium: Paulson Stadium

1985 NCAA Division I-AA independents football standings
	Conf.			Overall
Team	W	L	T	W		L		T
No. 9 Georgia Southern ^		–		13	–	2	–	0
No. 11 Eastern Washington ^		–		9	–	3	–	0
No. 18 Richmond		–		8	–	3	–	0
Colgate		–		7	–	3	–	1
Delaware		–		7	–	4	–	0
Tennessee State		–		7	–	4	–	0
No. 16 William & Mary		–		7	–	4	–	0
Lafayette		–		6	–	5	–	0
James Madison		–		5	–	6	–	0
Lehigh		–		5	–	6	–	0
Holy Cross		–		4	–	6	–	1
Florida A&M		–		4	–	7	–	0
Western Kentucky		–		4	–	7	–	0
Bucknell		–		3	–	7	–	0
Northeastern		–		2	–	8	–	0
^ – NCAA Division I-AA playoff participant; Rankings from NCAA Division I-AA Football Committee poll

The 1985 Georgia Southern Eagles football team represented the Georgia Southern Eagles of Georgia Southern College (now known as Georgia Southern University) during the 1985 NCAA Division I-AA football season. The Eagles played their home games at Paulson Stadium in Statesboro, Georgia. The team was coached by Erk Russell, in his fourth year as head coach for the Eagles. They went on to defeat Furman 44-42 in the Division 1-AA Championship Game to win their first of six Division 1-AA Championships and the first of two in a row.

Offensive Coordinator Paul Johnson, who would go on to be the head coach at Navy and Georgia Tech at the Division 1 level, specifically curtailed the offensive scheme, known as the Hambone, around quarterback Tracy Ham. Ham was an incredible athlete who can both run and pass, making the option offense of the Hambone very successful. Johnson would go on to popularize and refine a similar offense to the Hambone known as the flexbone, which has had great success across college football for many coaches and teams.

== Schedule ==
Date	Opponent	Rank	Site	Result	Attendance	Source
September 7	vs. Florida A&M		Gator Bowl; Jacksonville, FL (Bold City Classic)	W 27–21	18,086	
September 14	Middle Tennessee		Paulson Stadium; Statesboro, GA	L 10–35	9,227	
September 21	at Troy State		Veterans Memorial Stadium; Troy, AL	W 17–10	6,400	
September 28	at Chattanooga		Chamberlain Field; Chattanooga, TN	W 19–14	8,892	
October 5	Tennessee Tech		Paulson Stadium; Statesboro, GA	W 34–0	9,152	
October 12	Bethune–Cookman	No. 19	Paulson Stadium; Statesboro, GA	W 46–24	8,063	
October 26	Newberry	No. 8	Paulson Stadium; Statesboro, GA	W 38–17	12,831	
November 2	at James Madison	No. 7	JMU Stadium; Harrisonburg, VA	L 6–21	5,000	
November 9	UCF	No. 16	Paulson Stadium; Statesboro, GA	W 35–18	7,759	
November 16	East Tennessee State	No. 12	Paulson Stadium; Statesboro, GA	W 46–7	8,142	
November 23	at South Carolina State	No. 10	Oliver C. Dawson Stadium; Orangeburg, SC	W 43–30	6,543	
November 30	No. 15 Jackson State	No. 9	Paulson Stadium; Statesboro, GA (NCAA Division I-AA First Round)	W 27–0	4,128	
December 7	at No. 1 Middle Tennessee	No. 9	Johnny "Red" Floyd Stadium; Murfreesboro, TN (NCAA Division I-AA Quarterfinal)	W 28–21	9,500	
December 14	at No. 4 Northern Iowa	No. 9	UNI-Dome; Cedar Falls, IA (NCAA Division I-AA Semifinal)	W 40–33	12,300	
December 21	vs. No. T–2 Furman	No. 9	Tacoma Dome; Tacoma, WA (NCAA Division I-AA Championship Game)	W 44–42	5,306	
Rankings from NCAA Division I-AA Football Committee Poll released prior to the game
