= 1985 NCAA Division I-AA football rankings =

The 1985 NCAA Division I-AA football rankings are from the NCAA Division I-AA football committee. This is for the 1985 season.

== Legend ==
	Increase in ranking
	Decrease in ranking
	Not ranked previous week
(#–#)	Win–loss record
(Italics)	Number of first place votes
т	Tied with team above or below also with this symbol

== NCAA Division I-AA Football Committee poll ==
	Week 1 Sept 24	Week 2 Oct 1	Week 3 Oct 8	Week 4 Oct 15	Week 5 Oct 22	Week 6 Oct 29	Week 7 Nov 5	Week 8 Nov 12	Week 9 Nov 19	Week 10 Nov 26	
1.	Richmond (3–0)	Richmond (4–0)	Richmond (5–0)	Richmond (6–0)	Richmond (7–0)	Middle Tennessee State (7–0)	Middle Tennessee State (8–0)	Middle Tennessee State (9–0)	Middle Tennessee State (10–0)	Middle Tennessee State (11–0)	1.
2.	Nevada (3–0)	Grambling State (3–0)	Grambling State (4–0)	Grambling State (5–0)	Grambling State (6–0)	Furman (7–1)	Furman (8–1)	Furman (8–1)	Furman (9–1) т	Furman (10–1) т	2.
3.	Marshall (4–0)	Marshall (5–0)	Idaho (4–1) т	Middle Tennessee State (5–0)	Middle Tennessee State (6–0)	Nevada (7–1)	Nevada (8–1)	Nevada (9–1)	Nevada (10–1) т	Nevada (10–1) т	3.
4.	Grambling State (2–0)	Middle Tennessee State (4–0)	Middle Tennessee State (4–0) т	Idaho (5–1)	Idaho (6–1)	Richmond (7–1)	Grambling State (7–1)	Grambling State (8–1)	Northern Iowa (9–1)	Northern Iowa (10–1)	4.
5.	Middle Tennessee State (3–0)	William & Mary (3–1)	William & Mary (4–1) т	Furman (5–1)	Furman (6–1)	Grambling State (6–1) т	Northern Iowa (7–1)	Northern Iowa (8–1)	Idaho (8–2)	Idaho (9–2)	5.
6.	Arkansas State (2–2)	Idaho (3–1)	Murray State (4–0–1)	Mississippi Valley State (5–0)	Nevada (6–1)	Northern Iowa (6–1) т	Idaho (7–2)	Idaho (8–2)	Arkansas State (7–3)	Arkansas State (8–3)	6.
7.	William & Mary (2–1)	Murray State (3–0–1)	Marshall (5–0–1)	Nevada (5–1)	Northern Iowa (5–1)	Georgia Southern (6–1)	Mississippi Valley State (7–1)	Arkansas State (6–3) т	Rhode Island (9–2)	Rhode Island (9–2)	7.
8.	Delaware State (4–0) т	Illinois State (3–0–1) т	Mississippi Valley State (5–0)	Louisiana Tech (5–1) т	Georgia Southern (5–1)	Idaho (6–2)	Arkansas State (5–3)	Akron (7–2) т	Grambling State (8–2) т	Grambling State (9–2)	8.
9.	Murray State (2–0–1) т	Mississippi Valley State (4–0) т	Furman (4–1)	Northern Iowa (5–1) т	Delaware State (6–1)	Mississippi Valley State (6–1) т	Louisiana Tech (7–2) т	Richmond (8–2)	Murray State (7–2–1) т	Georgia Southern (9–2)	9.
10.	Idaho (2–1)	Furman (3–1)	Eastern Washington (5–0)	Georgia Southern (5–1)	Eastern Washington (6–1)	Eastern Washington (6–1) т	Akron (6–2) т	Rhode Island (8–2)	Georgia Southern (8–2) т	Akron (8–3)	10.
11.	Lamar Tech (3–0)	Nevada (3–1)	Nevada (5–0)	Delaware State (6–1)	Marshall (6–1–1)	Marshall (6–1–1)	Richmond (7–2)	Murray State (7–2–1)	Eastern Washington (7–2)	Eastern Washington (8–2)	11.
12.	Illinois State (2–0–1)	Louisiana Tech (3–1) т	Northern Iowa (4–1) т	William & Mary (4–2)	Mississippi Valley State (5–1)	Louisiana Tech (6–2)	Rhode Island (7–2)	Georgia Southern (7–2)	Delaware State (8–2)	Appalachian State (8–3) т	12.
13.	Mississippi Valley State (3–0)	Western Carolina (3–1) т	Louisiana Tech (4–1) т	Murray State (4–1–1) т	Akron (5–2)	Akron (5–2)	Murray State (6–2–1)	Delaware (7–3) т	Akron (7–3)	Delaware State (9–2) т	13.
14.	Delaware (2–1)	Northern Iowa (3–1)	Western Carolina (3–1–1)	Northeast Louisiana (4–1) т	Arkansas State (4–3)	New Hampshire (6–1)	Colgate (6–2)	Eastern Washington (6–2) т	Jackson State (7–2)	Louisiana Tech (8–3)	14.
15.	Rhode Island (2–1)	Lamar Tech (3–1)	Lamar Tech (3–1)	Southwest Missouri State (4–1–1)	Appalachian State (4–2)	Arkansas State (4–3)	Eastern Washington (6–2)	Delaware State (7–2)	Alcorn State (7–2)	Jackson State (8–2)	15.
16.	Appalachian State (2–1)	Harvard (2–0)	Delaware State (5–1)	Marshall (5–1–1)	Colgate (5–1)	Murray State (5–2–1)	Georgia Southern (6–2)	Jackson State (7–2)	Mississippi Valley State (8–2)	William & Mary (7–4)	16.
17.	UMass (2–1) (Note: In the actual printed polls, UMass was listed as Massachusetts)	Delaware State (4–1)	Eastern Kentucky (3–1) т	Eastern Washington (5–1)	Delaware (5–2)	Rhode Island (6–2) т	Delaware (6–3) т	Colgate (6–2–1)	Appalachian State (7–3)	Murray State (7–3–1)	17.
18.	Furman (2–1)	Southwest Missouri State (3–1–1)	Southwest Missouri State (4–1–1) т	Akron (4–2)	Louisiana Tech (5–2)	Eastern Kentucky (5–2) т	Delaware State (6–2) т	Mississippi Valley State (7–2) т	William & Mary (7–4)	Richmond (8–3)	18.
19.	Western Carolina (2–1)	Eastern Kentucky (2–1)	Georgia Southern (4–1)	Appalachian State (3–2) т	Murray State (4–2–1)	Idaho State (5–2) т	Penn (6–1) т	Alcorn State (6–2) т	Louisiana Tech (8–3)	Eastern Kentucky (8–3)	19.
20.	Louisiana Tech (2–1)	North Texas State (2–2)	Holy Cross (3–1)	Western Carolina (3–2–1) т	New Hampshire (5–1)	Delaware State (6–2) т	Chattanooga (5–3)	Marshall (7–2–1)	Richmond (8–3) т	Alcorn State (8–3)	20.
21.				Southern (4–1) т					Boise State (7–3) т		21.
22.				Arkansas State (3–3) т							22.
23.				Colgate (4–1) т							23.
24.				Delaware (4–2) т							24.
	Week 1 Sept 24	Week 2 Oct 1	Week 3 Oct 8	Week 4 Oct 15	Week 5 Oct 22	Week 6 Oct 29	Week 7 Nov 5	Week 8 Nov 12	Week 9 Nov 19	Week 10 Nov 26	
		Dropped: 6 Arkansas State; 14 Delaware; 15 Rhode Island; 16 Appalachian State; 17 UMass	Dropped: 8 Illinois State; 16 Harvard; 20 North Texas State	Dropped: 15 Lamar Tech; 17 Eastern Kentucky; 20 Holy Cross	Dropped: 12 William & Mary; 14 Northeast Louisiana; 15 Southwest Missouri State; 20 Western Carolina; 20 Southern	Dropped: 15 Appalachian State; 16 Colgate; 17 Delaware	Dropped: 11 Marshall; 14 New Hampshire; 18 Eastern Kentucky; 19 Idaho State	Dropped: 9 Louisiana Tech; 19 Penn; 20 Chattanooga	Dropped: 13 Delaware; 17 Colgate; 20 Marshall	Dropped: 16 Mississippi Valley State; 20 Boise State	
