= 1985 NCAA Division I-A football season =

American college football season

1985 NCAA Division I-A season
- Number of teams: 105
- Preseason AP No. 1: Oklahoma

Postseason
- Bowl games: 18
- Heisman Trophy: Auburn running back Bo Jackson
- Champion(s): Oklahoma (AP, Coaches, FWAA)

Division I-A football seasons
- ← 1984 1986 →

The 1985 NCAA Division I-A football season saw the Oklahoma Sooners, led by head coach Barry Switzer, win the national championship.

Oklahoma finished the season 11–1, with their only loss to Miami at home, in a game in which future NFL star Troy Aikman was lost for the season. The Sooners regrouped and went undefeated the rest of the way, finishing the season with a win over Penn State in the Orange Bowl.

Michigan would finish No. 2, the highest finish of a Bo Schembechler led team. The team shined on defense, led by All-Americans Mike Hammerstein and Mark Messner.

Tennessee finished the season with a victory over No. 2 Miami in the Sugar Bowl. This team won the school's first SEC championship in 16 years and was nicknamed the "Sugar Vols". The SEC title was the first of three for coach Johnny Majors.

The Air Force Falcons, under Fisher DeBerry, were 12–1 with their highest poll rankings in school history, defeating Texas in the Bluebonnet Bowl and finishing No. 8 in the AP Poll and No. 5 in the Coaches' Poll.

This year's edition of the Iron Bowl is widely considered to be one of the greatest ever. Despite Auburn having Heisman Trophy winner running back Bo Jackson on its side, Alabama won this game with a last second field goal.

This would be the last year for the I-A/I-AA hybrid Missouri Valley Conference in football. Five of the seven teams in the conference (Drake, Illinois State, Indiana State, Southern Illinois, and West Texas State) had been playing Division I-AA football since the 1982 season, while Tulsa and Wichita State would remain I-A, becoming independents the following season.

== Rule changes ==
- Kickoffs that sail through the end zone untouched will be placed at the 20-yard line, rescinding a rule adopted in 1984 that required the ball be placed at the 30-yard line.
- Offensive lineman will be allowed to use extended arms and open hands on all blocks, not just retreat blocks.
- The use of two goalposts is prohibited. All goalposts must now be of the "tuning fork" or "slingshot" style, with the crossbar rising from a single post.
- The seven-man officiating crew is now mandatory for all Division I-A conferences.

== September ==
The preseason AP Poll was led by No. 1 Oklahoma, No. 2 Auburn, No. 3 SMU, No. 4 Iowa, and No. 5 Florida. None of the top teams played in the first week of the season, so the top five remained the same in the first-regular season poll.

September 7: No. 1 Oklahoma and No. 4 Iowa had not started their seasons. No. 2 Auburn opened with a 49–7 defeat of Southwestern Louisiana. No. 3 SMU's 35–23 victory over UTEP did not impress the AP voters enough to keep the Mustangs in the top five. They fell behind No. 5 Florida, who won 35–23 at Miami, and No. 6 USC, who defeated No. 11 Illinois 20–10. The next poll featured No. 1 Auburn, No. 2 Oklahoma, No. 3 Florida, No. 4 USC, and No. 5 Iowa.

September 14: No. 1 Auburn won 29–18 over Southern Mississippi. No. 2 Oklahoma and No. 6 SMU were scheduled to play each other this weekend, but the game was postponed until December at the request of the television broadcasters. No. 3 Florida played Rutgers to a 28–28 tie. No. 5 Iowa opened with a 58–0 shutout of Drake, and No. 4 USC was idle. The next poll featured No. 1 Auburn, No. 2 Oklahoma, No. 3 USC, No. 4 Iowa, and No. 5 SMU.

September 21: No. 1 Auburn was idle, and No. 2 Oklahoma still had not begun their season. No. 3 USC lost 20–13 to Baylor. No. 4 Iowa beat Northern Illinois 48–20. No. 5 SMU was idle and fell out of the top five again. Moving up were No. 6 Florida State, who defeated Memphis 19-10 and had beaten perennial power Nebraska a few weeks earlier, and No. 7 Ohio State, who won 36–13 at Colorado. The top five in the next poll were No. 1 Auburn, No. 2 Oklahoma, No. 3 Iowa, No. 4 Florida State, and No. 5 Ohio State.

September 28: No. 1 Auburn lost 38–20 at Tennessee. No. 2 Oklahoma finally began their schedule with a 13–7 win at Minnesota, but the voters were more impressed by No. 3 Iowa's 57-3 blowout of Iowa State. No. 4 Florida State got past Kansas 24–20, No. 5 Ohio State beat Washington State 48–32, and No. 6 SMU won 56–21 at TCU. The top five in the next poll were No. 1 Iowa, No. 2 Oklahoma, No. 3 SMU, No. 4 Florida State, and No. 5 Ohio State.

== October ==
October 5: No. 1 Iowa got past Michigan State 35–31 on a bootleg run by quarterback Chuck Long for a touchdown with 27 seconds left. No. 2 Oklahoma won 41–6 at Kansas State. No. 3 SMU fell 28–6 to Arizona and soon dropped out of the polls, finishing just 6–5. No. 4 Florida State was idle. No. 5 Ohio State lost a close one, 31–28 at Illinois. No. 6 Oklahoma State (25-13 over Tulsa) and No. 7 Michigan (33-6 over Wisconsin) moved up in the next poll: No. 1 Iowa, No. 2 Oklahoma, No. 3 Michigan, No. 4 Florida State, and No. 5 Oklahoma State.

October 12: No. 1 Iowa won 23–13 at Wisconsin. No. 2 Oklahoma beat No. 17 Texas 14–7, but once again a lower-ranked team was more dominant than the Sooners as No. 3 Michigan overwhelmed Michigan State 31–0. No. 4 Florida State lost 59–27 at No. 12 Auburn, and No. 5 Oklahoma State fell 34–24 to No. 9 Nebraska. Moving up were No. 6 Arkansas, who won 30–7 at Texas Tech, and No. 7 Florida, who handled No. 14 Tennessee 17–10. The top five in the next poll were No. 1 Iowa, No. 2 Michigan, No. 3 Oklahoma, No. 4 Arkansas, and No. 5 Florida.

October 19: In a memorable Big Ten showdown between No. 1 Iowa and No. 2 Michigan, the Hawkeyes prevailed 12–10 on a field goal with two seconds left. No. 3 Oklahoma, playing their first home game of the year, lost 27–14 to Miami. No. 4 Arkansas also lost, falling 15–13 to Texas; both Iowa and the Longhorns scored all of their points on field goals in this weekend's victories. No. 5 Florida moved up again with a 45–0 shutout of Southwestern Louisiana. No. 6 Penn State won 24–20 at Syracuse, and No. 7 Nebraska defeated Missouri 28–20. The top five in the next poll were No. 1 Iowa, No. 2 Florida, No. 3 Penn State, No. 4 Michigan, and No. 5 Nebraska.

October 26: This weekend finally saw some stability at the top. No. 1 Iowa visited Northwestern and won 49–10, No. 2 Florida beat Virginia Tech 35–18, No. 3 Penn State blanked West Virginia 27–0, No. 4 Michigan defeated Indiana 42–15, and No. 5 Nebraska won 17–7 over Colorado. The top five remained the same in the next poll.

== November ==
November 2: No. 1 Iowa fell 22–13 to No. 8 Ohio State, while No. 2 Florida handled No. 6 Auburn 14–10. No. 3 Penn State defeated Boston College 16–12, but No. 4 Michigan had to settle for a 3–3 tie against Illinois. No. 5 Nebraska won 41–3 at Kansas State. No. 7 Air Force moved up with a 31–10 victory over San Diego State, becoming the first service academy in two decades to be ranked in the top five: No. 1 Florida, No. 2 Penn State, No. 3 Nebraska, No. 4 Ohio State, and No. 5 Air Force. Because Florida was on probation for recruiting violations and ineligible to be ranked in the Coaches’ Poll, the coaches picked Penn State as their top team.

November 9: No. 1 Florida went down 24–3 to No. 17 Georgia, and No. 2 Penn State grabbed the top spot in both polls with a 31–10 win at Cincinnati. No. 3 Nebraska overwhelmed Iowa State 49–0, No. 4 Ohio State won 35–17 at Northwestern, No. 5 Air Force beat Army 45–7, and No. 6 Iowa shut out Illinois 59–0. The next poll featured No. 1 Penn State, No. 2 Nebraska, No. 3 Ohio State, No. 4 Air Force, and No. 5 Iowa.

November 16: The top two teams won easily, as No. 1 Penn State defeated Notre Dame 36-6 and No. 2 Nebraska beat Kansas 56–6. Less fortunate were No. 3 Ohio State, who fell 12–7 to Wisconsin, and No. 4 Air Force, who lost 28–21 at No. 16 Brigham Young. No. 5 Iowa edged Purdue 27–24, while No. 6 Miami was idle. No. 7 Oklahoma shut out Colorado 31-0 and moved back into the top five: No. 1 Penn State, No. 2 Nebraska, No. 3 Iowa, No. 4 Miami, and No. 5 Oklahoma.

November 23: No. 1 Penn State, the only remaining undefeated team, finished their season with a 31-0 blowout of Pittsburgh. As was often the case in this era, the Big 8 championship came down to a battle between No. 2 Nebraska and No. 5 Oklahoma. This year the Sooners had an easy time, clinching an Orange Bowl berth with a 27–7 defeat of the Cornhuskers. No. 3 Iowa earned the Big Ten title and a Rose Bowl berth with a 31–9 win over Minnesota. Their opponent in Pasadena would be No. 8 UCLA, who lost 17–13 to USC this weekend but had already clinched the Pac-10 title. No. 4 Miami breezed past Colorado State 24–3. Iowa's victory eliminated No. 6 Michigan from Big Ten contention, but the Wolverines still came away with a 27–17 win over their rival, No. 12 Ohio State. The next poll featured No. 1 Penn State, No. 2 Iowa, No. 3 Oklahoma, No. 4 Miami, and No. 5 Michigan.

November 28–30: No. 1 Penn State, No. 2 Iowa, and No. 5 Michigan had finished their schedules. No. 3 Oklahoma, already assured of the Big 8 title, shut out No. 17 Oklahoma State 13–0, while No. 4 Miami dominated Notre Dame 58–7. In addition, the final two bowl tie-ins were determined this weekend. No. 10 Tennessee shut out Vanderbilt 30–0 to tie Florida for the SEC title; even though the Gators had the head-to-head advantage, their probation barred them from postseason games and delivered the Sugar Bowl spot to the Volunteers. Meanwhile, No. 15 Texas A&M and No. 18 Texas played each other for the SWC championship, and the Aggies dominated the Longhorns 42–10 to earn a Cotton Bowl berth. Miami moved up in the next poll: No. 1 Penn State, No. 2 Miami, No. 3 Iowa, No. 4 Oklahoma, and No. 5 Michigan.

== December ==
December 7: No. 4 Oklahoma finally played the game against SMU which had originally been scheduled for September 14, and the Sooners’ 35–13 victory moved them up one spot in the final poll of the regular season: No. 1 Penn State, No. 2 Miami, No. 3 Oklahoma, No. 4 Iowa, and No. 5 Michigan.

The highest-ranked postseason matchup would be the Orange Bowl between undefeated No. 1 Penn State and No. 3 Oklahoma. No. 2 Miami, the only team to defeat Oklahoma in the regular season, matched up with No. 8 Tennessee in the Sugar Bowl. The Rose Bowl featured the traditional Big Ten vs. Pac-10 game with No. 4 Iowa against No. 13 UCLA, and the Cotton Bowl pitted No. 11 Texas A&M against No. 16 Auburn. No. 5 Michigan and No. 7 Nebraska, the top-ranked teams which finished second in their respective conferences, would square off in the Fiesta Bowl.

== Conference standings ==
1985 Atlantic Coast Conference football standings
	Conf.					Overall
Team	W		L		T	W		L		T
No. 18 Maryland $	6	–	0	–	0	9	–	3	–	0
No. 19 Georgia Tech	5	–	1	–	0	9	–	2	–	1
Virginia	4	–	3	–	0	6	–	5	–	0
Clemson	4	–	3	–	0	6	–	6	–	0
North Carolina	3	–	4	–	0	5	–	6	–	0
Duke	2	–	5	–	0	4	–	7	–	0
NC State	2	–	5	–	0	3	–	8	–	0
Wake Forest	1	–	6	–	0	4	–	7	–	0
$ – Conference champion; Rankings from AP Poll

1985 Big Eight Conference football standings
	Conf.					Overall
Team	W		L		T	W		L		T
No. 1 Oklahoma $	7	–	0	–	0	11	–	1	–	0
No. 11 Nebraska	6	–	1	–	0	9	–	3	–	0
Oklahoma State	4	–	3	–	0	8	–	4	–	0
Colorado	4	–	3	–	0	7	–	5	–	0
Iowa State	3	–	4	–	0	5	–	6	–	0
Kansas	2	–	5	–	0	6	–	6	–	0
Kansas State	1	–	6	–	0	1	–	10	–	0
Missouri	1	–	6	–	0	1	–	10	–	0
$ – Conference champion; Rankings from AP Poll

1985 Big Ten Conference football standings
	Conf.					Overall
Team	W		L		T	W		L		T
No. 10 Iowa $	7	–	1	–	0	10	–	2	–	0
No. 2 Michigan	6	–	1	–	1	10	–	1	–	1
Illinois	5	–	2	–	1	6	–	5	–	1
No. 14 Ohio State	5	–	3	–	0	9	–	3	–	0
Michigan State	5	–	3	–	0	7	–	5	–	0
Minnesota	4	–	4	–	0	7	–	5	–	0
Purdue	3	–	5	–	0	5	–	6	–	0
Wisconsin	2	–	6	–	0	5	–	6	–	0
Indiana	1	–	7	–	0	4	–	7	–	0
Northwestern	1	–	7	–	0	3	–	8	–	0
$ – Conference champion; Rankings from AP Poll

1985 Mid-American Conference football standings
	Conf.					Overall
Team	W		L		T	W		L		T
Bowling Green $	9	–	0	–	0	11	–	1	–	0
Miami (OH)	7	–	1	–	1	8	–	2	–	1
Central Michigan	6	–	3	–	0	7	–	3	–	0
Western Michigan	4	–	4	–	1	4	–	6	–	1
Northern Illinois	4	–	4	–	0	4	–	7	–	0
Ball State	3	–	6	–	0	4	–	7	–	0
Eastern Michigan	3	–	6	–	0	4	–	7	–	0
Toledo	3	–	6	–	0	4	–	7	–	0
Kent State	2	–	6	–	0	3	–	8	–	0
Ohio	2	–	7	–	0	2	–	9	–	0
$ – Conference champion

1985 Missouri Valley Conference football standings
	Conf.					Overall
Team	W		L		T	W		L		T
Tulsa $	5	–	0	–	0	6	–	5	–	0
West Texas State	3	–	1	–	1	6	–	3	–	1
Illinois State	3	–	1	–	1	6	–	3	–	2
Indiana State	3	–	2	–	0	4	–	6	–	0
Wichita State	2	–	3	–	0	3	–	8	–	0
Southern Illinois	1	–	3	–	0	4	–	7	–	0
Drake	1	–	5	–	0	4	–	7	–	0
$ – Conference champion; The conference was a hybrid of NCAA Division I-A and I-AA programs. Tulsa and Wichita State were I-A and the other teams were I-AA.

1985 Pacific Coast Athletic Association football standings
	Conf.					Overall
Team	W		L		T	W		L		T
No. 16 Fresno State $	7	–	0	–	0	11	–	0	–	1
Cal State Fullerton	5	–	2	–	0	6	–	5	–	0
UNLV	4	–	2	–	1	5	–	5	–	1
Long Beach State	4	–	3	–	0	6	–	6	–	0
Utah State	3	–	4	–	0	3	–	8	–	0
San Jose State	2	–	4	–	1	2	–	8	–	1
Pacific (CA)	2	–	5	–	0	5	–	7	–	0
New Mexico State	0	–	7	–	0	1	–	10	–	0
$ – Conference champion; Rankings from Coaches Poll

1985 Pacific-10 Conference football standings
	Conf.					Overall
Team	W		L		T	W		L		T
No. 7 UCLA $	6	–	2	–	0	9	–	2	–	1
Arizona	5	–	2	–	0	8	–	3	–	1
Arizona State	5	–	2	–	0	8	–	4	–	0
Washington	5	–	3	–	0	7	–	5	–	0
USC	5	–	3	–	0	6	–	6	–	0
Oregon	3	–	4	–	0	5	–	6	–	0
Washington State	3	–	5	–	0	4	–	7	–	0
Stanford	3	–	5	–	0	4	–	7	–	0
Oregon State	2	–	6	–	0	3	–	8	–	0
California	2	–	7	–	0	4	–	7	–	0
$ – Conference champion; Rankings from AP Poll

1985 Southeastern Conference football standings
	Conf.					Overall
Team	W		L		T	W		L		T
No. 4 Tennessee $	5	–	1	–	0	9	–	1	–	2
No. 5 Florida	5	–	1	–	0	9	–	1	–	1
No. 13 Alabama	4	–	1	–	1	9	–	2	–	1
No. 20 LSU	4	–	1	–	1	9	–	2	–	1
Georgia	3	–	2	–	1	7	–	3	–	2
Auburn	3	–	3	–	0	8	–	4	–	0
Ole Miss	2	–	4	–	0	4	–	6	–	1
Vanderbilt	1	–	4	–	1	3	–	7	–	1
Kentucky	1	–	5	–	0	5	–	6	–	0
Mississippi State	0	–	6	–	0	5	–	6	–	0
$ – Conference champion; Florida ineligible for SEC championship due to NCAA probation.; Rankings from AP Poll

1985 Southwest Conference football standings
	Conf.					Overall
Team	W		L		T	W		L		T
No. 6 Texas A&M $	7	–	1	–	0	10	–	2	–	0
No. 12 Arkansas	6	–	2	–	0	10	–	2	–	0
No. 17 Baylor	6	–	2	–	0	9	–	3	–	0
Texas	6	–	2	–	0	8	–	4	–	0
SMU	5	–	3	–	0	6	–	5	–	0
Houston	3	–	5	–	0	4	–	7	–	0
Rice	2	–	6	–	0	3	–	8	–	0
Texas Tech	1	–	7	–	0	4	–	7	–	0
TCU	0	–	8	–	0	3	–	8	–	0
$ – Conference champion; Rankings from AP Poll

1985 Western Athletic Conference football standings
	Conf.					Overall
Team	W		L		T	W		L		T
No. 8 Air Force +	7	–	1	–	0	12	–	1	–	0
No. 16 BYU +	7	–	1	–	0	11	–	3	–	0
Utah	5	–	3	–	0	8	–	4	–	0
Hawaii	4	–	3	–	1	4	–	6	–	2
Colorado State	4	–	4	–	0	5	–	7	–	0
San Diego State	3	–	4	–	1	5	–	6	–	1
New Mexico	2	–	6	–	0	3	–	8	–	0
Wyoming	2	–	6	–	0	3	–	8	–	0
UTEP	1	–	7	–	0	1	–	10	–	0
+ – Conference co-champions; Rankings from AP Poll

1985 NCAA Division I-A independents football records
	Conf.					Overall
Team	W		L		T	W		L		T
No. 3 Penn State		–		–		11	–	1	–	0
No. 9 Miami (FL)		–		–		10	–	2	–	0
Army		–		–		9	–	3	–	0
No. 15 Florida State		–		–		9	–	3	–	0
West Virginia		–		–		7	–	3	–	1
Southern Miss		–		–		7	–	4	–	0
Syracuse		–		–		7	–	5	–	0
Virginia Tech		–		–		6	–	5	–	0
Pittsburgh		–		–		5	–	5	–	1
Cincinnati		–		–		5	–	6	–	0
Notre Dame		–		–		5	–	6	–	0
South Carolina		–		–		5	–	6	–	0
Southwestern Louisiana		–		–		4	–	7	–	0
Navy		–		–		4	–	7	–	0
Temple		–		–		4	–	7	–	0
Boston College		–		–		4	–	8	–	0
Memphis State		–		–		2	–	7	–	2
Rutgers		–		–		2	–	8	–	1
East Carolina		–		–		2	–	9	–	0
Louisville		–		–		2	–	9	–	0
Tulane		–		–		1	–	10	–	0
Rankings from AP Poll

== AP Final Poll ==
1. Oklahoma
2. Michigan
3. Penn State
4. Tennessee
5. Florida
6. Texas A&M
7. UCLA
8. Air Force
9. Miami (FL)
10. Iowa
11. Nebraska
12. Arkansas
13. Alabama
14. Ohio State
15. Florida State
16. BYU
17. Baylor
18. Maryland
19. Georgia Tech
20. LSU

== Final Coaches Poll ==
1. Oklahoma
2. Michigan
3. Penn St.
4. Tennessee
5. Air Force
6. UCLA
7. Texas A&M
8. Miami (FL)
9. Iowa
10. Nebraska
11. Ohio St.
12. Arkansas
13. Florida St.
14. Alabama
15. Baylor
16. Fresno St.
17. Brigham Young
18. Georgia Tech
19. Maryland
20. LSU

== Notable rivalry games ==
- Alabama 25, Auburn 23
- Arizona 16, Arizona State 13
- Florida 38, Florida State 14
- Georgia 24, Florida 3
- Georgia Tech 20, Georgia 16
- Iowa 57, Iowa State 3
- LSU 31, Tulane 19
- Michigan 31, Michigan State 0
- Michigan 27, Ohio State 17
- Minnesota 27, Wisconsin 18
- Navy 17, Army 7
- Notre Dame 37, USC 3
- Oklahoma 27, Nebraska 7
- Oklahoma 13, Oklahoma State 0
- Oklahoma 14, Texas 7
- Oregon 34, Oregon State 13
- Stanford 24, California 22
- Texas A&M 42, Texas 10
- USC 17, UCLA 13
- Washington State 21, Washington 20

== I-AA team wins over I-A teams ==
Italics denotes I-AA teams.

Date	Visiting team	Home team	Site	Result	Attendance	Ref.
August 31	Southwest Missouri State	Drake	Drake Stadium • Des Moines, Iowa	31–24	12,202	
September 7	Southwest Missouri State	Southern Illinois	McAndrew Stadium • Carbondale, Illinois	40–28	10,500	
September 7	Cal State Fullerton	Montana	Dornblaser Field • Missoula, Montana	30–31	6,235	
September 7	Richmond	Virginia Tech	Lane Stadium • Blacksburg, Virginia	24–14	21,100	
September 14	Kent State	Akron	Rubber Bowl • Akron, Ohio (Wagon Wheel)	0–24	32,183	
September 14	Navy	Delaware	Delaware Stadium • Newark, Delaware	13–16	23,110	
September 14	Southwestern Louisiana	Louisiana Tech	Joe Aillet Stadium • Ruston, Louisiana (rivalry)	23–24	17,000	
September 14	Ohio	Marshall	Fairfield Stadium • Huntington, West Virginia (Battle for the Bell)	7–31	17,511	
September 14	Nevada	Cal State Fullerton	Santa Ana Stadium • Santa Ana, California	30–3	6,317	
September 14	Northern Iowa	Kansas State	KSU Stadium • Manhattan, Kansas	10–6	15,500	
September 21	Eastern Michigan	Akron	Rubber Bowl • Akron, Ohio	12–16	12,236	
September 21	Louisiana Tech	West Texas State	Kimbrough Memorial Stadium • Canyon, Texas	20–10	7,025	
September 28	No. 18 (I-AA) Furman	NC State	Carter–Finley Stadium • Raleigh, North Carolina	42–20	36,600	
September 28	No. 4 (I-AA) Grambling State	Oregon State	Independence Stadium • Shreveport, Louisiana	23–6	13,396	
September 28	North Texas State	Kansas State	KSU Stadium • Manhattan, Kansas	22–10	22,000	
October 5	Wichita State	UT Arlington	Maverick Stadium • Arlington, Texas	3–31	4,850	
October 12	Illinois State	Eastern Illinois	O'Brien Stadium • Charleston, Illinois (Mid-America Classic)	14–21		
October 19	Eastern Washington	Long Beach State	Veterans Memorial Stadium • Long Beach, California	30–23	9,605	
November 2	Temple	Delaware	Delaware Stadium • Newark, Delaware	17–10	19,614	
November 2	No. T–5 (I-AA) Northern Iowa	Illinois State	Hancock Stadium • Normal, Illinois	15–3	4,847	
November 9	Southern Illinois	No. 8 (I-AA) Arkansas State	Indian Stadium • Jonesboro, Arkansas	12–41	10,104	
November 9	UNLV	No. 3 (I-AA) Nevada	Mackay Stadium • Reno, Nevada (Battle for Nevada)	7–48	13,417	
November 16	Eastern Kentucky	Louisville	Cardinal Stadium • Louisville, Kentucky	45–21	30,113	
November 16	McNeese State	Southwestern Louisiana	Cajun Field • Lafayette, Louisiana (Cajun Crown)	14–3		
November 16	Southern Illinois	Western Illinois	Hanson Field • Macomb, Illinois	7–14	1,478	
^{#}Rankings from AP Poll released prior to game.

Note: Murray State at Memphis State tied 10–10.

== AP Poll No. 1 and No. 2 progress ==
WEEKS	No. 1	No. 2	Event	
PRE-1	Oklahoma	Auburn	Auburn 49, LA-Lafayette 7	Sep 7
2–4	Auburn	Oklahoma	Tennessee 38, Auburn 20	Sep 28
5–6	Iowa	Oklahoma	Oklahoma 14, Texas 7	Oct 12
7	Iowa	Michigan	Iowa 12, Michigan 10	Oct 19
8–9	Iowa	Florida	Ohio State 22, Iowa 13	Nov 2
10	Florida	Penn State	Georgia 24, Florida 3	Nov 9
11–12	Penn State	Nebraska	Oklahoma 27, Nebraska 7	Nov 23
13	Penn State	Iowa	Miami 58, Notre Dame 7	Nov 30
14–15	Penn State	Miami	Oklahoma 25, Penn State 10	Jan 1

== Bowl games ==
New Year's Day bowls:

- Rose Bowl: No. 13 UCLA 45, No. 4 Iowa 28
- Sugar Bowl: No. 8 Tennessee 35, No. 2 Miami (FL) 7
- Cotton Bowl: No. 11 Texas A&M 36, No. 16 Auburn 16
- Orange Bowl: No. 3 Oklahoma 25, No. 1 Penn State 10
- Fiesta Bowl: No. 5 Michigan 27, No. 7 Nebraska 23

Other bowls:

- Florida Citrus Bowl: No. 17 Ohio State 10, No. 9 Brigham Young 7
- Gator Bowl: No. 18 Florida State 34, No. 19 Oklahoma State 23
- Holiday Bowl: No. 14 Arkansas 18, Arizona State 17
- Peach Bowl: Army 31, Illinois 29
- Sun Bowl: No. 20 Arizona 13, Georgia 13
- Independence Bowl: Minnesota 20, Clemson 13
- Liberty Bowl: Baylor 21, No. 12 LSU 7
- Aloha Bowl: No. 15 Alabama 24, USC 3
- Bluebonnet Bowl: No. 10 Air Force 24, Texas 16
- California Bowl: Fresno State 51, No. 20 Bowling Green 7
- All-American Bowl: Georgia Tech 17, Michigan State 14
- Freedom Bowl: Washington 20, Colorado 17
- Cherry Bowl: Maryland 35, Syracuse 18

== Heisman Trophy voting ==
The Heisman Trophy is given to the year's most outstanding player

Player	School	Position	1st	2nd	3rd	Total
Bo Jackson	Auburn	RB	317	218	122	1,509
Chuck Long	Iowa	QB	286	254	98	1,464
Robbie Bosco	BYU	QB	38	95	155	459
Lorenzo White	Michigan State	RB	50	63	115	391
Vinny Testaverde	Miami (FL)	QB	41	41	44	249
Jim Everett	Purdue	QB	12	11	19	77
Napoleon McCallum	Navy	RB	8	11	26	72
Allen Pinkett	Notre Dame	RB	9	13	18	71
Joe Dudek	Plymouth State	RB	12	4	12	56
Brian McClure	Bowling Green	QB	7	10	13	54
Thurman Thomas	Oklahoma State	RB	1	13	25	54

== Other annual awards ==
- Maxwell Award (College Player of the Year) - Chuck Long, Iowa
- Walter Camp Award (Back) - Bo Jackson, Auburn
- Davey O'Brien Award (Quarterback) - Chuck Long, Iowa
- Dick Butkus Award (Linebacker) - Brian Bosworth, Oklahoma
- Lombardi Award (Lineman or Linebacker) - Tony Casillas, Oklahoma
- Outland Trophy (Interior Lineman) - Mike Ruth, Boston College, 0T
- Paul "Bear" Bryant Award - Fisher DeBerry, Air Force

== Attendances ==
Average home attendance top 3:

Rank	Team	Average
1	Michigan Wolverines	105,588
2	Tennessee Volunteers	94,099
3	Ohio State Buckeyes	89,214
