= Chuck Shelton =

American football player and coach (1935–2020)

Charles Shelton
Biographical details
- Born: August 16, 1935; Rolla, Missouri, U.S.
- Died: February 13, 2020 (aged 84)

Playing career
- 1959–1960: Pittsburg State
- Position: Halfback

Coaching career (HC unless noted)
- 1961: Altamont HS (UT) (assistant)
- 1962–1963: Pratt HS (KS)
- 1964–1966: Nevada HS (MO)
- 1967–1968: Smith-Cotton HS (MO)
- 1969–1970: Pratt
- 1971: NE Missouri State (assistant)
- 1972: Eastern New Mexico (DC)
- 1973: Wichita State (OC/backfield)
- 1975–1976: Drake (AHC/DC)
- 1977–1985: Drake
- 1986–1991: Utah State
- 1992–1995: Pacific (CA)
- 1997: Amsterdam Admirals (LB)
- 1998: New York CityHawks
- 2009: Las Vegas Locomotives (RB)

Administrative career (AD unless noted)
- 1974–1975: Cincinnati (assistant AD)

Head coaching record
- Overall: 81–127–1 (college)

Accomplishments and honors

Championships
- 1 MVC (1981); 1 UFL (2009)

Charles Shelton (August 16, 1935 – February 13, 2020) was an American college football player and coach. He served as the head football coach at Drake University from 1977 until 1985, at Utah State University from 1986 to 1992, and at University of the Pacific in Stockton, California from 1992 to 1995, compiling a career college football coaching record of 81–127–1. He was the head coach at two schools, Drake and Pacific, when they canceled their football program. Drake brought it back for the 1987 school year, but Shelton had already left as head coach. Shelton was born in Rolla, Missouri and led the state of Missouri in rushing in 1954. During the 1954 season he averaged more than 12 yards per carry, and led his team to an undefeated season.

== Head coaching record ==
=== College ===
Year	Team	Overall	Conference	Standing	Bowl/playoffs
Drake Bulldogs (Missouri Valley Conference) (1977–1985)
1977	Drake	2–9	1–5	6th	
1978	Drake	4–7	3–3	4th	
1979	Drake	3–8	1–4	T–4th	
1980	Drake	8–3	3–2	4th	
1981	Drake	10–1	5–1	T–1st	
1982	Drake	4–7	2–4	5th	
1983	Drake	1–10	1–6	6th	
1984	Drake	4–7	2–3	T–4th	
1985	Drake	4–7	1–4	T–6th	
Drake:		40–59	19–32		
Utah State Aggies (Big West Conference) (1986–1991)
1986	Utah State	3–8	3–4	T–4th	
1987	Utah State	5–6	4–3	T–2nd	
1988	Utah State	4–7	4–3	T–3rd	
1989	Utah State	4–7	4–3	4th	
1990	Utah State	5–5–1	5–1–1	T–2nd	
1991	Utah State	5–6	5–2	3rd	
Utah State:		26–39–1	25–16–1		
Pacific Tigers (Big West Conference) (1992–1995)
1992	Pacific	3–8	2–4	6th	
1993	Pacific	3–8	2–4	T–6th	
1994	Pacific	6–5	4–2	4th	
1995	Pacific	3–8	2–4	T–8th	
Pacific:		15–29	10–14		
Total:		81–127–1			
National championship Conference title Conference division title or championship game berth
