= Max Falkenstien =

American radio sports announcer (1924–2019)

- Born: April 9, 1924; Lawrence, Kansas, U.S.
- Died: July 29, 2019 (aged 95); Lawrence, Kansas, U.S.
- Education: University of Kansas (1947)
- Occupation: Sportscaster
- Years active: 1946–2006

Max Falkenstien (April 9, 1924 – July 29, 2019) was an American radio sports announcer. In his 60-year career at the University of Kansas (1946–2006), Falkenstien covered more than 1,750 men's basketball games and 650 football games, a span that included every game played in Allen Fieldhouse until his retirement, and was one of the longest announcing tenures in sports. By comparison, Vin Scully's 67 seasons with the Brooklyn and Los Angeles Dodgers is the record for longest broadcasting tenure with a single franchise in all of professional sports.

== Biography ==
Falkenstien's father Earl was business manager of the KU athletic department for 33 years. Falkenstien's biology class at Liberty Memorial High School trooped over to KFKU, then KU's 50-watt radio station, in the early 1940s. "Each of us had to make some kind of comment -- it must have been a boring show," Falkenstien reflected, "and a lady came up to me afterward and asked me if wanted to be in radio because I had such a clear voice."

Falkenstien's first job in radio was at WREN, then a Lawrence radio station. "A guy named Earl Bratten gave me some news copy to read and I got the job," Falkenstien said. He worked before and after school and on weekends, usually 40 hours a week, and earned $90 a month. "The first time I ever went on the air was a Sunday morning to give a promo for an Eleanor Roosevelt broadcast," Falkenstien said, smiling. "It was just a 30-second plug, but I was so scared when that red light came on."

Falkenstien graduated from Liberty Memorial High School in 1942, six months after the Japanese bombed Pearl Harbor. After a semester at KU, he enlisted in the Army Air Corps in hopes of becoming a meteorologist. He left the service in March 1946. After leaving the service, he went back to work for WREN. His first assignment was to do the play-by-play for the NCAA district final game between KU and Oklahoma A&M (now Oklahoma State University). He obtained a degree in mathematics from Kansas University in 1948.

He also did play-by-play on TVS Saturday telecasts of Big Eight Conference games for several years. He was joined by Kansas State University broadcaster Paul Deweese. Credited with founding the KU Sports Network not long after World War II ended, Falkenstien quickly gave up the network because he really wasn't interested in earning a living as a play-by-play broadcaster. He was program and station manager of WREN radio from 1955 until 1967, when he had a falling out with the station's owner, former Kansas Governor Alf Landon. He then became the head of news and sports at WIBW radio and television from 1967 to 1970. After a one-year stint as the first general manager of Sunflower Cablevision, Falkenstien spent 23 years at Douglas County Bank, retiring as a senior vice president in December 1994.

== Final broadcasts ==
=== Home ===
Falkenstien's final broadcast in Allen Fieldhouse came on March 1, 2006, in the last home game of Kansas' 2006 basketball season, in which KU defeated Colorado, 75-54. Falkenstien was honored in a special halftime ceremony, which included his family, friends, some former KU players, and a speech from his on-air partner of 22 years, Bob Davis. Athletic Director Lew Perkins presented Falkenstien with a bronze Jayhawk to commemorate his long years of service to the University of Kansas. The number 60, the number of years he had broadcast for the Jayhawks, was retired and hung on a banner in Allen Fieldhouse rafters with those of the great players that have played for KU. This retirement ceremony made Falkenstien the 27th person so honored by the University, and the first non-athlete.

This game was also held on Kansas' senior night, which honored senior players Christian Moody, Jeff Hawkins, and Stephen Vinson in a post-game ceremony.

=== Away ===
The last broadcast of Falkenstien's sixtieth season came on March 17, 2006, in the first round of the 2006 NCAA Tournament. The fourth-seed Jayhawks lost the game, 73-77, to the thirteenth-seed Bradley Braves of the Missouri Valley Conference.

The last football broadcast of Falkenstien's career came in the 2005 Fort Worth Bowl, as Kansas defeated the Houston Cougars 42-13.

== Death ==
Falkenstien died on July 29, 2019, at the age of 95.

== Accolades ==
- 1995: Inducted, College Athletics Hall of Fame
- 1996: Winner, College Football Hall of Fame's Chris Schenkel Award. The award, named for legendary college football announcer Chris Schenkel, is given annually to a college football broadcaster who has excelled in his field and contributed to his community.
- 2001: Kansas Sports Hall of Fame; named "Best College Radio Personality" by The Sporting News.
- 2004: 15th Recipient of the Curt Gowdy Media Award, given by the Naismith Memorial Basketball Hall of Fame in recognition of excellence in electronic and print sports reporting.
