= Lew Perkins =

American athletic director (1945–2023)

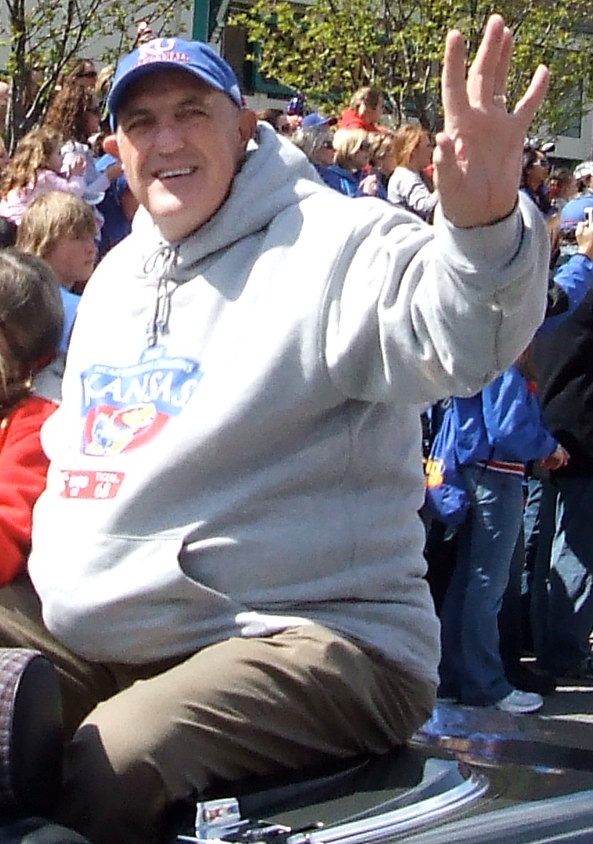
- Perkins at the 2008 Kansas Jayhawks Victory Parade

Biographical details
- Born: March 24, 1945; Boston, Massachusetts, U.S.
- Died: July 18, 2023 (aged 78); Lawrence, Kansas, U.S.

Playing career
- 1965–1967: Iowa

Coaching career (HC unless noted)
- 1969–1979: South Carolina–Aiken

Administrative career (AD unless noted)
- 1969–1980: South Carolina–Aiken
- 1980–1983: Penn (associate AD)
- 1983–1987: Wichita State
- 1987–1990: Maryland
- 1990–2003: Connecticut
- 2003–2010: Kansas

Head coaching record
- Overall: 125–155

Lew Perkins (March 24, 1945 – July 18, 2023) was an American athletic director. He ended his 40-year career at the University of Kansas (KU), having joined in June 2003, taking over for Al Bohl. Perkins previously held similar positions with the University of Connecticut, University of Maryland, College Park, Wichita State University and University of South Carolina Aiken where he gained a reputation for successfully cleaning up schools suffering under NCAA violations. Under Perkins direction, the athletics program at KU had several successful seasons, including winning the 2008 Orange Bowl in football and the 2008 men's basketball championship. His tenure, though, ultimately ended in scandal and early retirement in 2010.

== Biography ==
=== Early life ===
Perkins was a native of Chelsea, Massachusetts, where he was inducted into the High School Athletics Hall of Fame. Following high school, Perkins played basketball at the University of Iowa from 1965 to 1967, where he was coached by former KU great Ralph Miller, a member of the Naismith Hall of Fame. He also received an undergraduate degree in education from the institution. At Iowa, Perkins pledged and activated the Alpha Epsilon Pi fraternity.

== Administrative and coaching career ==
=== South Carolina Aiken ===
Perkins served as athletics director at the University of South Carolina Aiken from 1969 to 1980, overseeing the athletics department during the university's transition from a junior college to four-year institution. He also served as the head basketball coach from 1969 to 1979. In 1975 he received a master's degree in education from the University of South Carolina. In 2005, Perkins was awarded an honorary Doctorate of Education by the University of South Carolina Aiken.

=== Penn ===
From 1980 to 1983, Perkins served as associate athletic director at the University of Pennsylvania, managing the university's 28 varsity sports.

=== Wichita State ===
Perkins served as athletic director at Wichita State University from 1983 to 1987. Perkins took over a program that was on NCAA probation. Two years later, the NCAA cited WSU as having an "exemplary program." During his tenure as AD, the WSU football program was ended, due to mounting budget issues. During his tenure, Perkins hired Eddie Fogler to replace Gene Smithson as head basketball coach and Ron Chismar to replace Willie Jeffries as head football coach.

=== Maryland ===
Perkins served as athletic director at the University of Maryland, College Park from 1987 to 1990. Perkins was brought in by Maryland to clean up the program after the investigation into the death of basketball player Len Bias revealed foul play within the organization. Perkins left the university following another NCAA investigation that took place after then basketball coach Bob Wade revealed to him that he and his staff had been violating several NCAA rules. Before leaving he hired Gary Williams to be the new head coach. Williams was previously the coach of Ohio State.

=== Connecticut ===
From 1990 to 2003, Perkins served as athletic director for the University of Connecticut, earning nationwide recognition for his efforts. Under Perkins' watch, the program won six NCAA national championships, including four in women's basketball, one in men's basketball, and one in men's soccer. Perkins was instrumental in bringing Division I-A football to the university. The football team joined Division I-A in 2000, and the Big East in 2004, after Perkins' departure.

Perkins also brought drastic change to the athletics facilities. During Perkins' tenure, a $2 million hockey arena, the Mark Edward Freitas Ice Forum, $14 million student recreation center, a $2.5 million addition of seating to Harry A. Gampel Pavilion, a $3.5 million track and intramural facility, and the $90 million Rentschler Field football complex were all constructed.

In 2000, he became the inaugural winner of the National Athletic Director of the Year Award.

During his tenure, Perkins hired Skip Holtz as head football coach and Randy Edsall after Holtz resigned to join his father at South Carolina.

=== Kansas ===
Perkins served as athletic director of the University of Kansas from June 2003 to September 2010. While Perkins was AD, the football program won the 2008 Orange Bowl, and Kansas basketball brought home the 2008 men's basketball championship. Upon arrival at KU, Perkins became aware of potential NCAA rules violations at KU and he initiated an internal investigation. After KU self-reported violations, the NCAA ruled in 2006 that KU demonstrated a "lack of institutional control" under its prior Athletic Director. As a result, Perkins added at least two new full-time compliance officers to the department.

Perkins brought many facilities upgrades to the campus, and raised KU's athletics budget from $27 million to over $55 million. Ten million dollars' worth of renovations to Allen Fieldhouse were completed in 2005–06, including a new videoboard. Another $15 million was approved for further upgrades to the facility. The Booth Family Hall of Athletics was added to the eastern side of the fieldhouse, at a cost of $5 million. The Anderson Family Football complex officially opened on July 30, 2008, adjacent to the football field at Memorial Stadium, at a cost of $31 million. In 2009, $42 million in improvements for a new basketball practice and training facility, locker rooms, donor atrium, new concourses and other upgrades to Allen Fieldhouse were completed. Additionally $8 million was spent for improvement of student athlete housing. Other facilities upgrades during Perkins' tenure included new baseball and softball facilities, and a boathouse for the rowing team.

Several major deals were negotiated during Perkins' tenure, including a $26.67 million deal with Adidas, a $40 million deal with ESPN, and an $86 million deal with IMG.

In 2008, Time magazine named Perkins one of the top-35 sports executives in the world, the only collegiate executive to make the list.

However, Perkins' time at KU concluded with scandal. In March 2010, KU announced that it was conducting an internal investigation into the Athletics Department ticket office. A separate investigation by the FBI and IRS ultimately resulted in federal charges against five employees of the Athletics Department and one consultant, alleging that they had stolen more than $2 million of KU tickets to be illegally resold during Perkins' tenure. Perkins was not implicated in the scheme, but many of the five employees charged with crimes were hired or promoted to their positions by Perkins. By February 2011, all five employees pleaded guilty to the charges. Separately, in May 2010, Perkins was accused by a former Athletic Department employee of personally accepting exercise equipment in exchange for giving premium basketball tickets. As a result, Perkins was eventually fined by the State of Kansas Ethics Commission for violating rules against accepting gifts.

On June 10, 2010, Perkins announced that he would retire after the 2010–11 school year, effective September 4, 2011. However, Perkins soon accelerated this schedule, and one year early, on September 7, 2010, he announced his retirement would be effective immediately. KU Chancellor Bernadette Gray-Little named Associate Athletics Director Sean Lester as interim director for Kansas athletics. Despite the early retirement, KU agreed to pay Perkins the full $2 million salary he would have earned if he had stayed through September 2011, including a $600,000 retention bonus that he would have earned for working at KU through June 2011.

=== Death ===
Perkins died in Lawrence, Kansas, on July 18, 2023, at the age of 78.

== Other service ==
- Basketball Issues Committee
- Chair of the Big 12 Board of Athletics Directors
- Big 12 Television Committee
- Board of Directors of the Naismith Memorial Basketball Hall of Fame
- Gatorade Board of Directors
