= 1985 Long Beach State 49ers football team =

American college football season

1985 Long Beach State 49ers football
- Conference: Pacific Coast Athletic Association
- Record: 6–6 (4–3 PCAA)
- Head coach: Mike Sheppard (2nd season)
- Defensive coordinator: Ken Visser (5th season)
- Home stadium: Veterans Stadium

1985 Pacific Coast Athletic Association football standings
	Conf.					Overall
Team	W		L		T	W		L		T
No. 16 Fresno State $	7	–	0	–	0	11	–	0	–	1
Cal State Fullerton	5	–	2	–	0	6	–	5	–	0
UNLV	4	–	2	–	1	5	–	5	–	1
Long Beach State	4	–	3	–	0	6	–	6	–	0
Utah State	3	–	4	–	0	3	–	8	–	0
San Jose State	2	–	4	–	1	2	–	8	–	1
Pacific (CA)	2	–	5	–	0	5	–	7	–	0
New Mexico State	0	–	7	–	0	1	–	10	–	0
$ – Conference champion; Rankings from Coaches Poll

The 1985 Long Beach State 49ers football team represented California State University, Long Beach (Note: The official name of Long Beach State has been California State University, Long Beach since 1972. However, it is still commonly known as Long Beach State.) during the 1985 NCAA Division I-A football season.

Hopes were high as the 49er's returned 15 starters heading into the 1985 season. They were once again led by senior quarterback Doug Gaynor who passed for 3563 yards a 71.2% completion percentage and 19 TD's. He returned his entire receiving corps from the previous season including Charles Lockett 69 catches, 949 yards and 10 TD's, Troy Ory (46–554–5), tight end Greg Locy (38–502–0) and running back Mark Templeton (62–500–1). The rushing attack was led by Martin Sartin who ran for 441 yards and scored 13 total TD's. The Niners also received a strong contribution from Sheldon Gaines who gained a combined 514 yards rushing and receiving along with leading the team as a kick-returner. The defense was led by a strong pass rush from ends Tom Hensley and Chuck Meierbachtol. Val James led the secondary with 5 interceptions.

The Niners were a "streaky" team in 1985. They lost their first two games, then reeled off three wins, two losses, three wins and finally two losses. The highlight of the season was a showdown with Fresno St. The 49er's were only one game behind the Bulldogs in the PCAA standings for this late-season matchup. The game was an exciting one, as the 49ers drove down the field in the waning seconds. A 54-yard field goal attempt sailed wide right and Fresno prevailed 33–31, clinching the conference championship.

Cal State Long Beach competed in the Pacific Coast Athletic Association. (Note: The Big West Conference was known as the Pacific Coast Athletic Association from its founding in 1969 through 1987.) The team was led by second-year head coach Mike Sheppard, and played home games at Veterans Stadium adjacent to the campus of Long Beach City College in Long Beach, California. They finished the season with a record of six wins and six losses (6–6, 4–3 PCAA).

== Schedule ==
Date	Time	Opponent	Site	Result	Attendance	Source
September 7	7:00 pm	Utah State	Veterans Memorial Stadium; Long Beach, CA	L 17–19	8,621	
September 14	7:00 pm	at San Diego State*	Jack Murphy Stadium; San Diego, CA	L 14–34	30,866	
September 21	7:30 pm	at Hawaii*	Aloha Stadium; Halawa, HI	W 33–30	43,076	
September 28	5:00 pm	at UNLV	Sam Boyd Silver Bowl; Whitney, NV	W 28–24	21,816	
October 5	7:00 pm	at Boise State*	Bronco Stadium; Boise ID	W 17–16	15,509	
October 12	7:00 pm	at Tulsa*	Skelly Stadium; Tulsa, OK	L 35–37	12,262	
October 19	1:30 pm	No. 17 Eastern Washington*	Veterans Memorial Stadium; Long Beach, CA	L 23–30	9,605	
October 26	7:00 pm	New Mexico State	Veterans Memorial Stadium; Long Beach, CA	W 38–17	5,369	
November 2	1:30 pm	at Pacific (CA)	Pacific Memorial Stadium; Stockton, CA	W 20–7	16,723	
November 7	7:00 pm	San Jose State	Veterans Memorial Stadium; Long Beach, CA	W 37–22	7,110	
November 16	7:00 pm	Fresno State	Veterans Memorial Stadium; Long Beach, CA	L 31–33	15,240	
November 23	1:00 pm	at Cal State Fullerton	Santa Ana Stadium; Santa Ana, CA	L 27–38	4,012	
*Non-conference game; Rankings from NCAA Division I-AA Football Committee Poll released prior to the game; All times are in Pacific time

== Roster ==
1985 Long Beach State 49ers football team roster
Players
Coaches
Offense

Pos.	#	Name	Class
QB	19	Doug Gaynor	Sr
RB	34	Martin Sartin	Sr
RB	25	Mark Templeton	Jr
WR	1	Charles Lockett	Jr
WR	80	Troy Ory	Sr
TE	89	Greg Locy	Jr
OT	75	Joe Iosefa	Jr
G	66	Dickson Falefia	Sr
C	55	John Stapleton	Sr

Defense

Pos.	#	Name	Class
DE	84	Tom Hensley	Sr
DE	64	Chuck Meierbachtol	Sr
LB	33	Dave Carter	Sr
LB	32	Kevin Moore	Sr
CB	9	Val James	Jr
FS	18	Roger Beavers	Jr

Special teams

Pos.	#	Name	Class
KR	8	Sheldon Gaines	Sr

Head coach

Coordinators/assistant coaches

Legend

- (C) Team captain
- (S) Suspended
- (I) Ineligible
- Injured
- Redshirt

== Team players in the NFL ==
The following were selected in the 1986 NFL draft.

Player	Position	Round	Overall	NFL team
Doug Gaynor	Quarterback	4	99	Cincinnati Bengals

The following finished their Cal State Long Beach career in 1985, were not drafted, but played in the NFL.

Player	Position	First NFL team
Martin Sartin	Running back	1987 San Diego Chargers
Sheldon Gaines	Wide receiver	1987 Buffalo Bills
