= 1985 California Bowl =

Bowling Green Falcons	Fresno State Bulldogs
(11-0)	(10–0-1)
7	51
Head coach: Denny Stolz	Head coach: Jim Sweeney
AP / Coaches; 20 / NR	AP / Coaches; NR / 18
	1	2	3	4	Total
Bowling Green	0	0	0	7	7
Fresno State	7	16	14	14	51
- Date: December 14, 1985
- Season: 1985
- Stadium: Bulldog Stadium
- Location: Fresno, California
- Attendance: 32,554

The 1985 California Bowl, was an American college football bowl game played on December 14, 1985 at Bulldog Stadium in Fresno, California. The game pitted the Fresno State Bulldogs and the Bowling Green Falcons.

== Background ==
The Falcons won every single regular season game, opening the season with a 31-6 trouncing of Ball State. They defeated their two non-conference opponents (Kentucky and Akron) while winning every MAC game by at least four points. This was the second Mid-American Conference title for the Falcons in four seasons. Coach Stolz announced before the game that he would leave the program for San Diego State. Fresno State did not lose any game in the regular season, with only a tie to Hawaii being the one blemish en route to their third Pacific Coast Athletic Association title in eight years and second California Bowl appearance in four seasons, which was also against Bowling Green.

== Game summary ==
- Fresno State - James Williams 10 yard touchdown run (Belli kick), 9:29, 1st qtr.
- Fresno State - Anthony Mosley 1 yard touchdown run (Belli kick), 8:02, 2nd qtr.
- Fresno State - Gene Taylor 33 yard touchdown pass from Kevin Sweeney (Belli kick), 6:59, 2nd qtr.
- Fresno State - Safety, Brian McClure tackled in end zone, 4:39, 2nd qtr.
- Fresno State - Gene Taylor 53 yard touchdown pass from Kevin Sweeney (Belli kick), 10:08, 3rd qtr.
- Fresno State - Kelly Skipper 29 yard touchdown run (Belli kick), 3:09, 3rd qtr.
- Bowling Green - Jeff Davis 18 yard touchdown run (Silvi kick), 14:28, 4th qtr.
- Fresno State - Stephen Baker 40 yard touchdown pass from Kevin Sweeney (Belli kick), 8:56, 4th qtr.
- Fresno State - Kelly Skipper 13 yard touchdown run (Belli kick), 5:57, 4th qtr.

The Falcons had committed just five turnovers the whole season. In the California Bowl, they turned the ball over eight times (five fumbles, three interceptions). Fresno State had 225 rushing yards and 194 passing yards. Bowling Green had 89 rushing yards and 259 passing yards. For Bowling Green, Brian McClure went 22-of-42 passes for 254 yards with 3 interceptions. Kevin Sweeney (son of coach Jim Sweeney) went 9-of-19 for 185 yards with 3 touchdowns and 1 interception. Fresno State’s Mike Mancini was named MVP; first punter to be selected as an MVP in a college football bowl game.

== Aftermath ==
Fresno State made two more bowl games before the decade ended, both of them being in the California Bowl. The two teams met again in the California Bowl in 1991.
