= Fred Zechman =

American football player and coach

Biographical details
- Born: c. 1945

Playing career
- 1963–1966: Capital

Coaching career (HC unless noted)
- 1973–1978: Miami Trace HS (OH)
- 1979–1982: Ohio State (QB/WR)
- 1983–1985: New Mexico State

Head coaching record
- Overall: 9–24 (college); 55–6–1 (high school)

Fred Zechman (born c. 1945) is an American former football coach. He served as the head football coach at New Mexico State University from 1983 to 1985, compiling a record of 9–24. Zechman graduated from Capital University in Bexley, Ohio, where he played college football from 1963 to 1966. He was the head football coach at Miami Trace High School in Washington Court House, Ohio from 1973 to 1978, tallying a mark of 55–6–1. Zechman worked as an assistant football coach at Ohio State University under head coach Earle Bruce from 1979 to 1982.

== Head coaching record ==
=== College ===
Year	Team	Overall	Conference	Standing	Bowl/playoffs
New Mexico State Aggies (Missouri Valley Conference) (1983)
1983	New Mexico State	5–6	3–2	3rd	
New Mexico State Aggies (Pacific Coast Athletic Association) (1984–1985)
1984	New Mexico State	3–8	1–6	7th	
1985	New Mexico State	1–10	0–7	8th	
New Mexico State:		9–24	4–15		
Total:		9–24			
