= 1985 Utah State Aggies football team =

American college football season

1985 Utah State Aggies football
- Conference: Pacific Coast Athletic Association
- Record: 3–8 (3–4 PCAA)
- Head coach: Chris Pella (3rd season)
- Defensive coordinator: Kent Baer (3rd season)
- Home stadium: Romney Stadium

1985 Pacific Coast Athletic Association football standings
	Conf.					Overall
Team	W		L		T	W		L		T
No. 16 Fresno State $	7	–	0	–	0	11	–	0	–	1
Cal State Fullerton	5	–	2	–	0	6	–	5	–	0
UNLV	4	–	2	–	1	5	–	5	–	1
Long Beach State	4	–	3	–	0	6	–	6	–	0
Utah State	3	–	4	–	0	3	–	8	–	0
San Jose State	2	–	4	–	1	2	–	8	–	1
Pacific (CA)	2	–	5	–	0	5	–	7	–	0
New Mexico State	0	–	7	–	0	1	–	10	–	0
$ – Conference champion; Rankings from Coaches Poll

The 1985 Utah State Aggies football team represented Utah State University during the 1985 NCAA Division I-A football season as a member of the Pacific Coast Athletic Association (PCAA). The Aggies were led by third-year head coach Chris Pella and played their home games at Romney Stadium in Logan, Utah. They finished the season with a record of three wins and eight losses (3–8, 3–4 PCAA).

== Schedule ==
Date	Opponent	Site	Result	Attendance	Source
September 7	at Long Beach State	Veterans Memorial Stadium; Long Beach, CA	W 19–17	8,621	
September 14	at Iowa State*	Cyclone Stadium; Ames, IA	L 3–10	42,455	
September 21	San Jose State	Romney Stadium; Logan, UT	W 35–32	9,754	
September 28	at Pacific (CA)	Pacific Memorial Stadium; Stockton, CA	L 7–33	15,000	
October 5	at UNLV	Sam Boyd Silver Bowl; Whitney, NV	L 7–14	13,982	
October 12	Cal State Fullerton	Romney Stadium; Logan, UT	L 30–32	9,047	
October 19	at Arizona State*	Sun Devil Stadium; Tempe, AZ	L 10–42	59,543	
October 26	Fresno State	Romney Stadium; Logan, UT	L 19–38	10,702	
November 2	at Utah*	Robert Rice Stadium; Salt Lake City, UT (Battle of the Brothers, Beehive Boot)	L 7–34	30,124	
November 9	No. 18 BYU*	Romney Stadium; Logan, UT (rivalry, Beehive Boot)	L 0–44	29,024	
November 23	at New Mexico State	Aggie Memorial Stadium; Las Cruces, NM	W 40–23	5,278	
*Non-conference game; Rankings from AP Poll released prior to the game
