= 1985 New Mexico State Aggies football team =

American college football season

1985 New Mexico State Aggies football
- Conference: Pacific Coast Athletic Association
- Record: 1–10 (0–7 PCAA)
- Head coach: Fred Zechman (3rd season)
- Home stadium: Aggie Memorial Stadium

1985 Pacific Coast Athletic Association football standings
	Conf.					Overall
Team	W		L		T	W		L		T
No. 16 Fresno State $	7	–	0	–	0	11	–	0	–	1
Cal State Fullerton	5	–	2	–	0	6	–	5	–	0
UNLV	4	–	2	–	1	5	–	5	–	1
Long Beach State	4	–	3	–	0	6	–	6	–	0
Utah State	3	–	4	–	0	3	–	8	–	0
San Jose State	2	–	4	–	1	2	–	8	–	1
Pacific (CA)	2	–	5	–	0	5	–	7	–	0
New Mexico State	0	–	7	–	0	1	–	10	–	0
$ – Conference champion; Rankings from Coaches Poll

The 1985 New Mexico State Aggies football team was an American football team that represented New Mexico State University in the Pacific Coast Athletic Association during the 1985 NCAA Division I-A football season. In their third year under head coach Fred Zechman, the Aggies compiled a 1–10 record. The team played its home games at Aggie Memorial Stadium in Las Cruces, New Mexico.

== Schedule ==
Date	Opponent	Site	Result	Attendance	Source
September 7	at San Jose State	Spartan Stadium; San Jose, CA	L 3–32	16,665	
September 14	New Mexico*	Aggie Memorial Stadium; Las Cruces, NM (rivalry)	L 27–34	23,262	
September 21	at UTEP*	Sun Bowl; El Paso, TX (rivalry)	W 22–20	26,810	
September 28	at No. 10 Arkansas*	War Memorial Stadium; Little Rock, AR	L 13–45	54,984	
October 5	Pacific (CA)	Aggie Memorial Stadium; Las Cruces, NM	L 10–19	11,445	
October 19	Fresno State	Aggie Memorial Stadium; Las Cruces, NM	L 21–48	16,544	
October 26	at Long Beach State	Veterans Memorial Stadium; Long Beach, CA	L 17–38	5,369	
October 31	at UNLV	Sam Boyd Stadium; Whitney, NV	L 12–17	16,263	
November 9	at Cal State Fullerton	Santa Ana Stadium; Santa Ana, CA	L 17–21	3,829	
November 16	West Texas State*	Aggie Memorial Stadium; Las Cruces, NM	L 25–55	6,872	
November 23	Utah State*	Aggie Memorial Stadium; Las Cruces, NM	L 23–40	5,278	
*Non-conference game; Rankings from AP Poll released prior to the game
