= 1985 San Jose State Spartans football team =

American college football season

1985 San Jose State Spartans football
- Conference: Pacific Coast Athletic Association
- Record: 2–8–1 (2–4–1 PCAA)
- Head coach: Claude Gilbert (2nd season)
- Home stadium: Spartan Stadium

1985 Pacific Coast Athletic Association football standings
	Conf.					Overall
Team	W		L		T	W		L		T
No. 16 Fresno State $	7	–	0	–	0	11	–	0	–	1
Cal State Fullerton	5	–	2	–	0	6	–	5	–	0
UNLV	4	–	2	–	1	5	–	5	–	1
Long Beach State	4	–	3	–	0	6	–	6	–	0
Utah State	3	–	4	–	0	3	–	8	–	0
San Jose State	2	–	4	–	1	2	–	8	–	1
Pacific (CA)	2	–	5	–	0	5	–	7	–	0
New Mexico State	0	–	7	–	0	1	–	10	–	0
$ – Conference champion; Rankings from Coaches Poll

The 1985 San Jose State Spartans football team represented San Jose State University during the 1985 NCAA Division I-A football season as a member of the Pacific Coast Athletic Association. (Note: The Big West Conference was known as the Pacific Coast Athletic Association from its founding in 1969 through 1987.) The team was led by head coach Claude Gilbert, in his second year as head coach at San Jose State. They played home games at Spartan Stadium in San Jose, California. The Spartans finished the 1985 season with a record of two wins, eight losses and one tie (2–8–1, 2–4–1 PCAA).

== Schedule ==
Date	Opponent	Site	TV	Result	Attendance	Source
August 31	at California*	California Memorial Stadium; Berkeley, CA		L 21–48	41,500	
September 7	New Mexico State	Spartan Stadium; San Jose, CA		W 32–3	16,665	
September 14	at Stanford*	Stanford Stadium; Stanford, CA (rivalry)		L 7–41	68,000	
September 21	at Utah State	Romney Stadium; Logan, UT		L 32–35	9,754	
October 3	Cal State Fullerton	Spartan Stadium; San Jose, CA	ESPN	L 18–20	12,126	
October 12	at Fresno State	Bulldog Stadium; Fresno, CA (rivalry)		L 17–37	34,004	
October 19	at Arizona*	Arizona Stadium; Tucson, AZ		L 0–41	45,361	
October 26	Pacific (CA)^{†}	Spartan Stadium; San Jose, CA (Victory Bell)		W 34–26	11,294	
November 2	at Oregon*	Autzen Stadium; Eugene, OR		L 13–35	25,501	
November 7	at Long Beach State	Veterans Memorial Stadium; Long Beach, CA	ESPN	L 22–37	7,110	
November 23	UNLV	Spartan Stadium; San Jose, CA		T 16–16	16,233	
*Non-conference game; ^{†}Homecoming

== Team players in the NFL ==
No San Jose State Spartans were selected in the 1986 NFL draft.

The following finished their college career in 1985, were not drafted, but played in the NFL.

Player	Position	First NFL team
Dan Clark	Linebacker	1987 Los Angeles Rams
