= 1985 Wichita State Shockers football team =

Season of Wichita State University team

1985 Wichita State Shockers football
- Conference: Missouri Valley Conference
- Record: 3–8 (2–3 MVC)
- Head coach: Ron Chismar (2nd season)
- Offensive coordinator: Fayne Henson (4th season)
- Offensive scheme: Pro-style
- Defensive coordinator: Wayne Donner (2nd season)
- Base defense: 5–2
- Home stadium: Cessna Stadium

1985 Missouri Valley Conference football standings
	Conf.					Overall
Team	W		L		T	W		L		T
Tulsa $	5	–	0	–	0	6	–	5	–	0
West Texas State	3	–	1	–	1	6	–	3	–	1
Illinois State	3	–	1	–	1	6	–	3	–	2
Indiana State	3	–	2	–	0	4	–	6	–	0
Wichita State	2	–	3	–	0	3	–	8	–	0
Southern Illinois	1	–	3	–	0	4	–	7	–	0
Drake	1	–	5	–	0	4	–	7	–	0
$ – Conference champion; The conference was a hybrid of NCAA Division I-A and I-AA programs. Tulsa and Wichita State were I-A and the other teams were I-AA.

The 1985 Wichita State Shockers football team represented Wichita State University in the 1985 NCAA Division I-A football season. The Shockers competed in their 89th season overall and 42nd in the Missouri Valley Conference, playing their home games at Cessna Stadium. The team, led by second-year head coach Ron Chismar, improved on their 2–9 output from the previous season, going 3–8.

This was the final season of football for the Missouri Valley Conference, as the league, which by this point was a mixture of NCAA Division I-A (Tulsa and Wichita State) and NCAA Division I-AA programs (Drake, Illinois State, Indiana State, Southern Illinois, and West Texas State), voted on April 30, 1985 to drop football at the end of the 1985 season.

== Schedule ==
Date	Opponent	Site	Result	Attendance	Source
September 7	at Kansas State*	KSU Stadium; Manhattan, KS	W 16–10	30,300	
September 14	at Minnesota*	Metrodome; Minneapolis, MN	L 14–28	56,094	
September 21	Toledo*	Cessna Stadium; Wichita, KS	L 15–22	18,165	
September 28	Southwestern Louisiana*	Cessna Stadium; Wichita, KS	L 15–23	9,876	
October 5	at UT Arlington*	Maverick Stadium; Arlington, TX	L 3–31	4,850	
October 12	at West Texas State	Kimbrough Memorial Stadium; Canyon, TX	L 21–33	10,237	
October 19	Drake	Cessna Stadium; Wichita, KS	W 24–21	8,302	
October 26	Southern Illinois	Cessna Stadium; Wichita, KS	W 35–34	7,473	
November 2	Tulsa	Cessna Stadium; Wichita, KS	L 26–42	11,760	
November 9	at Illinois State	Hancock Stadium; Normal, IL	L 0–26	4,423	
November 21	at Fresno State*	Bulldog Stadium; CA	L 6–47	30,904	
*Non-conference game
