= Al Molde =

American football coach and college athletics administrator

Biographical details
- Born: November 15, 1943 (age 82)

Coaching career (HC unless noted)
- 1971–1972: Sioux Falls
- 1973–1979: Minnesota–Morris
- 1980–1982: Central Missouri State
- 1983–1986: Eastern Illinois
- 1987–1996: Western Michigan
- 2013: Saarland Hurricanes

Administrative career (AD unless noted)
- 1981–1983: Central Missouri State
- 1997–2012: Gustavus Adolphus

Head coaching record
- Overall: 168–104–8 (college)
- Bowls: 0–1
- Tournaments: 2–3 (NCAA Div III playoffs); 1–2 (NCAA Div I-AA playoffs)

Accomplishments and honors

Championships
- 4 NIC (1975–1978); 2 Mid-Continent (1983–1984); 1 Gateway (1986); 1 MAC (1988)

Awards
- MAC Coach of the Year (1988)

Al Molde (born November 15, 1943) is an American former football coach and college athletics administrator. He served as the head football coach at Sioux Falls College (1971–1972), the University of Minnesota Morris (1973–1979), Central Missouri State University (1980–1982), Eastern Illinois University (1983–1986), and Western Michigan University (1987–1996), compiling a career college football coaching record of 168–104–8 (.614). Molde retired as the athletic director at Gustavus Adolphus College in St. Peter, Minnesota on June 1, 2012, having held the position since 1997. Under his guidance, the Golden Gusties finished in the top 20 in the NCAA Division III NACDA Director's Cup standings several times. In 2013, Molde briefly returned to coaching with the Saarland Hurricanes of the German Football League.

== Coaching career ==
Molde's collegiate coaching career has included stops at Sioux Falls College (1971–1972), University of Minnesota Morris (1973–1979), and Central Missouri State University (1980–1982), as well as the schools listed below.

=== Eastern Illinois ===
Molde was the 20th head football coach at Eastern Illinois University in Charleston, Illinois and he held that position for four seasons, from 1983 until 1986. His career coaching record at Eastern Illinois was 32–15 (.681) and he guided his 1983 and 1986 teams into the NCAA Division I-AA playoffs, with the latter team finishing the season with a record of 11–2 and one of the most prolific passing offenses in the nation. While the head coach at Eastern, he tutored current Denver Broncos head coach Sean Payton.

=== Western Michigan ===
Prior to his tenure at Gustavus, he was the head football coach at Western Michigan University from 1987 through 1996, where he is tied with William H. Spaulding as the winningest coach in school history (62–47–2, .568) and led the Broncos to the Mid-American Conference championship in 1988. At the time of his departure, he was also among the top 10 winningest coaches in college football, with 168 wins during his 26-year career.

Western Michigan University inducted Molde into its Athletics Hall of Fame in a ceremony on October 31, 2008. Molde earned Mid-American Conference Coach of the Year honors in guiding WMU to its first outright MAC championship and a California Bowl berth in 1988. Among other highlights during his 10-year career at WMU, Molde boasts the highest home winning percentage (37–16, .698) in school history, is tied with William H. Spaulding for the most career wins (62), coached 22 of the 100 players on WMU's "All Century Team," has the eighth-most victories among all-time MAC football coaches, and his teams led the MAC in passing offense five times (1987, 1988, 1990, 1992, 1994), total offense three times (1988, 1990, 1992), scoring offense once (1988), and rushing defense and scoring defense once (1994). During his tenure, WMU notched notable non-conference wins over Wisconsin (the school's first win over a Big Ten team), Iowa State, Army, Temple and battled TCU to a tie. Molde had a winning record against seven of the nine other MAC schools and his teams finished third or better in 6 of his 10 seasons coaching in the league.

=== Saarland Hurricanes ===
Molde returned to coaching in the fall of 2012 and took over the reins of the Saarland Hurricanes (Saarbrücken, Germany) of the German Football League for the 2013 season.

== Head coaching record ==
=== College ===
Year	Team	Overall	Conference	Standing	Bowl/playoffs
Sioux Falls Braves (Tri-State Conference) (1971–1972)
1971	Sioux Falls	0–8–1	0–5	6th	
1972	Sioux Falls	5–4	1–4	T–5th	
Sioux Falls:		5–12–1	1–9		
Minnesota–Morris Cougars (Northern Intercollegiate Conference) (1973–1979)
1973	Minnesota–Morris	3–6	2–4	T–4th	
1974	Minnesota–Morris	3–7	2–4	T–5th	
1975	Minnesota–Morris	8–1	6–0	1st	
1976	Minnesota–Morris	8–1–1	7–0	1st	
1977	Minnesota–Morris	10–2	7–0	1st	L NCAA Division III Semifinal
1978	Minnesota–Morris	11–1	8–0	1st	L NCAA Division III Semifinal
1979	Minnesota–Morris	9–3	6–2	3rd	L NCAA Division III Quarterfinal
Minnesota–Morris:		52–21–1	38–10		
Central Missouri State Mules (Missouri Intercollegiate Athletic Association) (1980–1982)
1980	Central Missouri State	6–3–1	3–3	T–3rd	
1981	Central Missouri State	4–3–3	2–2–1	4th	
1982	Central Missouri State	7–3	3–2	T–2nd	
Central Missouri State:		17–9–4	8–7–1		
Eastern Illinois Panthers (Mid-Continent Conference) (1983–1984)
1983	Eastern Illinois	9–3	3–0	1st	L NCAA Division I-AA First Round
1984	Eastern Illinois	6–5	2–1	T–1st	
Eastern Illinois Panthers (Gateway Football Conference) (1985–1986)
1985	Eastern Illinois	6–5	2–3	T–3rd	
1986	Eastern Illinois	11–2	5–1	1st	L NCAA Division I-AA Quarterfinal
Eastern Illinois:		32–15	12–5		
Western Michigan Broncos (Mid-American Conference) (1987–1996)
1987	Western Michigan	5–6	4–4	5th	
1988	Western Michigan	9–3	7–1	1st	L California Bowl
1989	Western Michigan	5–6	3–5	6th	
1990	Western Michigan	7–4	5–3	T–3rd	
1991	Western Michigan	6–5	4–4	T–5th	
1992	Western Michigan	7–3–1	6–3	2nd	
1993	Western Michigan	7–3–1	6–1–1	2nd	
1994	Western Michigan	7–4	5–3	T–3rd	
1995	Western Michigan	7–4	6–2	T–3rd	
1996	Western Michigan	2–9	2–6	9th	
Western Michigan:		62–47–2	50–32–1		
Total:		168–104–8			
National championship Conference title Conference division title or championship game berth
