= 1985 UNLV Rebels football team =

American college football season

1985 UNLV Rebels football
- Conference: Pacific Coast Athletic Association
- Record: 5–5–1 (4–2–1 PCAA)
- Head coach: Harvey Hyde (4th season)
- Home stadium: Sam Boyd Silver Bowl

1985 Pacific Coast Athletic Association football standings
	Conf.					Overall
Team	W		L		T	W		L		T
No. 16 Fresno State $	7	–	0	–	0	11	–	0	–	1
Cal State Fullerton	5	–	2	–	0	6	–	5	–	0
UNLV	4	–	2	–	1	5	–	5	–	1
Long Beach State	4	–	3	–	0	6	–	6	–	0
Utah State	3	–	4	–	0	3	–	8	–	0
San Jose State	2	–	4	–	1	2	–	8	–	1
Pacific (CA)	2	–	5	–	0	5	–	7	–	0
New Mexico State	0	–	7	–	0	1	–	10	–	0
$ – Conference champion; Rankings from Coaches Poll

The 1985 UNLV Rebels football team was an American football team that represented the University of Nevada, Las Vegas (UNLV) as a member of the Pacific Coast Athletic Association (PCAA) during the 1985 NCAA Division I-A football season. In their fourth and final year under head coach Harvey Hyde, the Rebels compiled an overall record of 5–5–1 with a mark of 4–2–1 in conference play, placing third in the PCAA. The team played home games at the Sam Boyd Silver Bowl in Whitney, Nevada.

== Schedule ==
Date	Opponent	Site	Result	Attendance	Source
September 7	Tennessee Tech*	Sam Boyd Silver Bowl; Whitney, NV	W 35–7	22,123	
September 14	at Fresno State	Bulldog Stadium; Fresno, CA	L 6–26	33,754	
September 21	at Wisconsin*	Camp Randall Stadium; Madison, WI	L 23–26	68,123	
September 28	Long Beach State	Sam Boyd Silver Bowl; Whitney, NV	L 24–28	21,816	
October 5	Utah State	Sam Boyd Silver Bowl; Whitney, NV	W 14–7	16,002	
October 12	Pacific (CA)	Sam Boyd Silver Bowl; Whitney, NV	W 24–14	19,970	
October 19	at Cal State Fullerton	Santa Ana Stadium; Santa Ana, CA	W 10–6	8,110	
October 26	Southwestern Louisiana*	Sam Boyd Silver Bowl; Whitney, NV	L 13–20	16,269	
October 31	New Mexico State	Sam Boyd Silver Bowl; Whitney, NV	W 17–12	16,263	
November 16	at Nevada*	Mackay Stadium; Reno, NV (Fremont Cannon)	L 7–48	13,417	
November 23	at San Jose State	Spartan Stadium; San Jose, CA	T 16–16	16,233	
*Non-conference game
