= Ron Chismar =

American football coach (1934–1998)

Biographical details
- Born: October 23, 1934
- Died: December 26, 1998 (aged 64); Phoenix, Arizona, U.S.

Coaching career (HC unless noted)
- 1970–1973: Bowling Green (assistant)
- 1974–1979: Michigan State (OL)
- 1980–1983: Arizona State (OC/OL)
- 1984–1986: Wichita State
- 1987–1988: Rice (AHC/DC)
- 1989–1992: Temple (AHC/DC)
- 1993–1996: Fort Scott

Head coaching record
- Overall: 8–25 (college); 17–19–2 (junior college)
- Tournaments: 2–4 (KJCCC playoffs)

Ronald F. Chismar (October 23, 1934 – December 26, 1998) was an American football coach. He served as the head football coach at Wichita State University from 1984 to 1986, compiling a record of 8–25.

Chismar graduated from Kent State University in 1961 with a Bachelor of Science in education and earned a Master of Science degree from the University of Akron in 1969. During the 1960s, he coached high school football in Ohio. Chismar began his college football coaching career at Bowling Green State University in 1970 as an assistant on Don Nehlen's staff. He remained at Bowling Green through the 1973 season before moving to Michigan State University in 1974 to coach the offensive line under Denny Stolz and then Darryl Rogers. When Rogers's became the head coach at Arizona State University in 1980, Chismar moved with him to serve as offensive coordinator. Chismar helped lead the Arizona State Sun Devils to the 1983 Fiesta Bowl, where they defeated the Oklahoma and finished the season ranked No. 6 in both major polls.

Following Wichita State discontinuing its football program after the conclusion of the 1986 season, Chismar returned to assistant coaching at Rice University. He also coached at Temple University, then moved to Fort Scott Community College in Fort Scott, Kansas, to serve as head football coach and athletic director. Chismar died on December 26, 1998, in Phoenix, Arizona.

== Head coaching record ==
=== College ===
Year	Team	Overall	Conference	Standing
Wichita State Shockers (Missouri Valley Conference) (1984–1985)
1984	Wichita State	2–9	2–3	T–4th
1985	Wichita State	3–8	2–3	5th
Wichita State Shockers (NCAA Division I-A independent) (1986)
1986	Wichita State	3–8		
Wichita State:		8–25	4–6	
Total:		8–25		

=== Junior college ===
Year	Team	Overall	Conference	Standing	Bowl/playoffs
Fort Scott Greyhounds (Kansas Jayhawk Community College Conference) (1993–1996)
1993	Fort Scott	4–4–1	2–3–1	5th	L KJCCC first round
1994	Fort Scott	5–5	3–3	T–3rd	L KJCCC semifinal
1995	Fort Scott	5–4–1	2–3–1	4th	L KJCCC semifinal
1996	Fort Scott	3–6	3–4	5th	L KJCCC first round
Fort Scott:		17–19–2	10–13–2		
Total:		17–19–2			
