= 1985 Fresno State Bulldogs football team =

American college football season

1985 Fresno State Bulldogs football

PCAA champion California Bowl champion

California Bowl, W 51–7 vs. Bowling Green
- Conference: Pacific Coast Athletic Association

Ranking
- Coaches: No. 16
- Record: 11–0–1 (7–0 PCAA)
- Head coach: Jim Sweeney (8th season)
- Home stadium: Bulldog Stadium

1985 Pacific Coast Athletic Association football standings
	Conf.					Overall
Team	W		L		T	W		L		T
No. 16 Fresno State $	7	–	0	–	0	11	–	0	–	1
Cal State Fullerton	5	–	2	–	0	6	–	5	–	0
UNLV	4	–	2	–	1	5	–	5	–	1
Long Beach State	4	–	3	–	0	6	–	6	–	0
Utah State	3	–	4	–	0	3	–	8	–	0
San Jose State	2	–	4	–	1	2	–	8	–	1
Pacific (CA)	2	–	5	–	0	5	–	7	–	0
New Mexico State	0	–	7	–	0	1	–	10	–	0
$ – Conference champion; Rankings from Coaches Poll

The 1985 Fresno State Bulldogs football team represented California State University, Fresno as a member of the Pacific Coast Athletic Association (PCAA) during the 1985 NCAA Division I-A football season. Led by eighth-year head coach Jim Sweeney, Fresno State compiled an overall record of 11–0–1 with a mark of 7–0 in conference play, winning the PCAA title. The Bulldogs played their home games at Bulldog Stadium in Fresno, California.

Fresno State earned their second NCAA Division I-A postseason bowl game berth in 1985. They played the 20th ranked, Mid-American Conference (MAC) champion Bowling Green in the fifth annual California Bowl at Bulldog Stadium on December 18, winning 51–7.

== Schedule ==
Date	Opponent	Site	Result	Attendance	Source
September 14	UNLV	Bulldog Stadium; Fresno, CA	W 26–6	33,754	
September 21	at Oregon State*	Parker Stadium; Corvallis, OR	W 33–24	31,162	
September 28	Cal Poly*	Bulldog Stadium; Fresno, CA	W 59–10	32,536	
October 5	Hawaii*	Bulldog Stadium; Fresno, CA (rivalry)	T 24–24	29,676	
October 12	San Jose State	Bulldog Stadium; Fresno, CA (rivalry)	W 37–17	34,004	
October 19	at New Mexico State	Aggie Memorial Stadium; Las Cruces, NM	W 48–21	16,544	
October 26	at Utah State	Romney Stadium; Logan, UT	W 38–19	10,702	
November 2	Cal State Fullerton	Bulldog Stadium; Fresno, CA	W 42–7	30,514	
November 9	at Pacific (CA)	Pacific Memorial Stadium; Stockton, CA	W 43–37	14,000	
November 16	at Long Beach State	Veterans Memorial Stadium; Long Beach, CA	W 33–31	15,240	
November 21	Wichita State*	Bulldog Stadium; Fresno, CA	W 47–6	30,904	
December 14	No. 20 Bowling Green*	Bulldog Stadium; Fresno, CA (California Bowl)	W 51–7	32,554	
*Non-conference game; Rankings from AP Poll released prior to the game

== Team players in the NFL ==
No Fresno State Bulldogs were selected in the 1986 NFL draft. he following finished their college career in 1985, were not drafted, but played in the NFL.

Player	Position	First NFL team
Chris Pacheco	Nose tackle	1987 Los Angeles Rams
Lavale Thomas	Running back	1987 Green Bay Packers
Mike Moffitt	Tight end	1986 Green Bay Packers
Victor Burnett	Defensive end	1987 St. Louis Cardinals
