= 1985 Pacific Tigers football team =

American college football season

1985 Pacific Tigers football
- Conference: Pacific Coast Athletic Association
- Record: 5–7 (2–5 PCAA)
- Head coach: Bob Cope (3rd season)
- Defensive coordinator: Kirk Harmon (1st season)
- Home stadium: Pacific Memorial Stadium

1985 Pacific Coast Athletic Association football standings
	Conf.					Overall
Team	W		L		T	W		L		T
No. 16 Fresno State $	7	–	0	–	0	11	–	0	–	1
Cal State Fullerton	5	–	2	–	0	6	–	5	–	0
UNLV	4	–	2	–	1	5	–	5	–	1
Long Beach State	4	–	3	–	0	6	–	6	–	0
Utah State	3	–	4	–	0	3	–	8	–	0
San Jose State	2	–	4	–	1	2	–	8	–	1
Pacific (CA)	2	–	5	–	0	5	–	7	–	0
New Mexico State	0	–	7	–	0	1	–	10	–	0
$ – Conference champion; Rankings from Coaches Poll

The 1985 Pacific Tigers football team represented the University of the Pacific (UOP) in the 1985 NCAA Division I-A football season as a member of the Pacific Coast Athletic Association. (Note: The Big West Conference was known as the Pacific Coast Athletic Association from its founding in 1969 through 1987.)

The team was led by head coach Bob Cope, in his third year, and played their home games at Pacific Memorial Stadium (Note: Amos Alonzo Stagg Memorial Stadium was known as Pacific Memorial Stadium from its opening in 1950 through 1987.) in Stockton, California. They finished the season with a record of four wins and seven losses (5–7, 2–5 PCAA). The Tigers were outscored by their opponents 292–301 over the season.

== Schedule ==
Date	Opponent	Site	Result	Attendance	Source
September 7	Sacramento State*	Pacific Memorial Stadium; Stockton, CA	W 49–17	24,498	
September 14	at Central Michigan*	Kelly/Shorts Stadium; Mount Pleasant, MI	L 10–27	24,922	
September 21	at Arizona State*	Sun Devil Stadium; Tempe, AZ	L 0–27	59,538	
September 28	Utah State	Pacific Memorial Stadium; Stockton, CA	W 33–7	15,000	
October 5	at New Mexico State	Aggie Memorial Stadium; Las Cruces, NM	W 19–10	11,445	
October 12	at UNLV	Sam Boyd Silver Bowl; Whitney, NV	L 14–24	19,970	
October 19	at Hawaii*	Aloha Stadium; Halawa, HI	W 24–15	34,963	
October 26	at San Jose State	Spartan Stadium; San Jose, CA (Victory Bell)	L 26–34	11,294	
November 2	Long Beach State^{†}	Pacific Memorial Stadium; Stockton, CA	L 7–20	16,723	
November 9	Fresno State	Pacific Memorial Stadium; Stockton, CA	L 37–43	14,000	
November 23	Weber State*	Pacific Memorial Stadium; Stockton, CA	W 36–34		
November 30	Cal State Fullerton	Santa Ana Stadium; Santa Ana, CA	L 37–43	4,215	
*Non-conference game; ^{†}Homecoming

== Team players in the NFL ==
The following UOP players were selected in the 1986 NFL draft.

Player	Position	Round	Overall	NFL team
Gene Thomas	Wide receiver	11	304	New England Patriots
