= 1985 Tulsa Golden Hurricane football team =

American college football season

1985 Tulsa Golden Hurricane football

MVC champion
- Conference: Missouri Valley Conference
- Record: 6–5 (5–0 MVC)
- Head coach: Don Morton (1st season)
- Defensive coordinator: Mike Daly (1st season)
- Home stadium: Skelly Stadium

1985 Missouri Valley Conference football standings
	Conf.					Overall
Team	W		L		T	W		L		T
Tulsa $	5	–	0	–	0	6	–	5	–	0
West Texas State	3	–	1	–	1	6	–	3	–	1
Illinois State	3	–	1	–	1	6	–	3	–	2
Indiana State	3	–	2	–	0	4	–	6	–	0
Wichita State	2	–	3	–	0	3	–	8	–	0
Southern Illinois	1	–	3	–	0	4	–	7	–	0
Drake	1	–	5	–	0	4	–	7	–	0
$ – Conference champion; The conference was a hybrid of NCAA Division I-A and I-AA programs. Tulsa and Wichita State were I-A and the other teams were I-AA.

The 1985 Tulsa Golden Hurricane football team represented the University of Tulsa as a member of the Missouri Valley Conference (MVC) during the 1985 NCAA Division I-A football season. In their first year under head coach Don Morton, the Golden Hurricane compiled an overall record of 6–5 record with a mark of 5–0 against conference opponents, winning the MVC title for the sixth consecutive season.

The team's statistical leaders included quarterback Steve Gage with 1,069 passing yards, Gordon Brown with 1,201 rushing yards, and Ronnie Kelly with 379 receiving yards.

== Schedule ==
Date	Opponent	Site	Result	Attendance	Source
September 7	Houston (Note: Designated conference game)	Skelly Stadium; Tulsa, OK	W 31–24	28,156	
September 14	Texas Tech*	Skelly Stadium; Tulsa, OK	L 17–21	29,972	
September 21	at No. 14 Arkansas*	War Memorial Stadium; Little Rock, AR	L 0–24	55,112	
September 28	at Texas A&M*	Kyle Field; College Station, TX	L 10–45	44,342	
October 5	at No. 6 Oklahoma State*	Lewis Field; Stillwater, OK (rivalry)	L 13–25	49,400	
October 12	Long Beach State*	Skelly Stadium; Tulsa, OK	W 37–35	12,262	
October 19	at Florida State*	Doak Campbell Stadium; Tallahassee, FL	L 14–76	53,500	
October 26	West Texas State	Skelly Stadium; Tulsa, OK	W 44–17	11,378	
November 2	at Wichita State	Cessna Stadium; Wichita, KS	W 42–26	11,760	
November 9	Drake^{†}	Skelly Stadium; Tulsa, OK	W 45–15	12,872	
November 16	at East Carolina	Ficklen Memorial Stadium; Greenville, NC	W 21–20	23,126	
*Non-conference game; ^{†}Homecoming; Rankings from AP Poll released prior to the game

== After the season ==
=== 1986 NFL draft ===
The following Golden Hurricane player was selected in the 1986 NFL draft following the season.

Round	Pick	Player	Position	NFL club
12	314	Mike Williams	Linebacker	Pittsburgh Steelers
