= 1985 Cal State Fullerton Titans football team =

American college football season

1985 Cal State Fullerton Titans football
- Conference: Pacific Coast Athletic Association
- Record: 6–5 (5–2 PCAA)
- Head coach: Gene Murphy (6th season)
- Defensive coordinator: Bob Burt (6th season)
- Home stadium: Santa Ana Stadium

1985 Pacific Coast Athletic Association football standings
	Conf.					Overall
Team	W		L		T	W		L		T
No. 16 Fresno State $	7	–	0	–	0	11	–	0	–	1
Cal State Fullerton	5	–	2	–	0	6	–	5	–	0
UNLV	4	–	2	–	1	5	–	5	–	1
Long Beach State	4	–	3	–	0	6	–	6	–	0
Utah State	3	–	4	–	0	3	–	8	–	0
San Jose State	2	–	4	–	1	2	–	8	–	1
Pacific (CA)	2	–	5	–	0	5	–	7	–	0
New Mexico State	0	–	7	–	0	1	–	10	–	0
$ – Conference champion; Rankings from Coaches Poll

The 1985 Cal State Fullerton Titans football team represented California State University, Fullerton as a member of the Pacific Coast Athletic Association (PCAA) during the 1985 NCAA Division I-A football season. Led by sixth-year head coach Gene Murphy, Cal State Fullerton compiled an overall record of 6–5 with a mark of 5–2 in conference play, placing second in the PCAA. The Titans played their home games at Santa Ana Stadium in Santa Ana, California.

== Schedule ==
Date	Opponent	Site	TV	Result	Attendance	Source
September 7	at Montana*	Dornblaser Field; Missoula, MT		L 30–31	6,235	
September 14	Nevada*	Santa Ana Stadium; Santa Ana, CA		L 3–30	6,317	
September 21	at Wyoming*	War Memorial Stadium; Laramie, WT		L 8–31	13,629	
October 3	at San Jose State	Spartan Stadium; San Jose, California	ESPN	W 20–18	12,126	
October 12	at Utah State	Romney Stadium; Logan, UT		W 32–30	9,047	
October 19	UNLV	Santa Ana Stadium; Santa Ana, CA		L 6–10	8,110	
November 2	at Fresno State	Bulldog Stadium; Fresno, CA		L 7–42	30,514	
November 9	New Mexico State	Santa Ana Stadium; Santa Ana, CA		W 21–17	3,829	
November 16	at Northern Arizona*	Walkup Skydome; Flagstaff, AZ		W 22–8	3,762	
November 23	Long Beach State	Santa Ana Stadium; Santa Ana, CA		W 38–27	4,012	
November 30	Pacific (CA)	Santa Ana Stadium; Santa Ana, CA		W 43–37	4,215	
*Non-conference game

== Team players in the NFL ==
The following Cal State Fullerton Titans were selected in the 1986 NFL draft.

Player	Position	Round	Overall	NFL team
Mark Collins	Defensive back	2	44	New York Giants
James Pruitt	Wide receiver	4	107	Miami Dolphins

The following finished their college career in 1985, were not drafted, but played in the NFL.

Player	Position	First NFL team
Wade Lockett	Wide receiver	1987 Los Angeles Raiders
