= 1985 Southwest Missouri State Bears football team =

American college football season

1985 Southwest Missouri State Bears football
- Conference: Gateway Collegiate Athletic Conference
- Record: 6–4–1 (2–2–1 GCAC)
- Head coach: Rich Johanningmeier (10th season)
- Captains: Kevin Bor; Keith Williams
- Home stadium: Briggs Stadium

1985 Gateway Collegiate Athletic Conference football standings
| | Conf. | | | | | Overall |
| Team | W | | L | | T | W | | L | | T |
|---|---|---|---|---|---|---|---|---|---|---|
| No. 4 Northern Iowa $^ | 5 | – | 0 | – | 0 | 11 | – | 2 | – | 0 |
| Southwest Missouri State | 2 | – | 2 | – | 1 | 6 | – | 4 | – | 1 |
| Western Illinois | 2 | – | 3 | – | 0 | 5 | – | 5 | – | 0 |
| Southern Illinois | 2 | – | 3 | – | 0 | 4 | – | 7 | – | 0 |
| Eastern Illinois | 2 | – | 3 | – | 0 | 6 | – | 5 | – | 0 |
| Illinois State | 1 | – | 3 | – | 1 | 6 | – | 3 | – | 2 |
$ – Conference champion; ^ – NCAA Division I-AA playoff participant; Rankings from NCAA Division I-AA Football Committee poll

The 1985 Southwest Missouri State Bears football team represented Southwest Missouri State University (now known as Missouri State University) as a member of the Gateway Collegiate Athletic Conference (GCAC) during the 1985 NCAA Division I-AA football season. Led by 10th-year head coach Rich Johanningmeier, the Bears compiled an overall record of 6–4–1, with a mark of 2–2–1 in conference play, and finished second in the GCAC.

== Schedule ==
| Date | Opponent | Rank | Site | Result | Attendance | Source |
|---|---|---|---|---|---|---|
| August 31 | at Drake* | | Drake Stadium; Des Moines, IA | W 31–24 | 12,202 | |
| September 7 | at Southern Illinois | | McAndrew Stadium; Carbondale, IL | W 40–28 | 9,600 | |
| September 14 | Illinois State | | Briggs Stadium; Springfield, MO | T 17–17 | | |
| September 21 | Northern Iowa | | Briggs Stadium; Springfield, MO | L 17–38 | 7,750 | |
| September 28 | Western Kentucky* | | Briggs Stadium; Springfield, MO | W 47–7 | 7,515 | |
| October 5 | at Northeast Missouri State* | No. 18 | Stokes Stadium; Kirksville, MO | W 59–33 | | |
| October 19 | at Eastern Illinois | No. 15 | O'Brien Stadium; Charleston, IL | L 27–28 | 4,065 | |
| October 26 | No. 19 Murray State* | | Briggs Stadium; Springfield, MO | L 21–36 | | |
| November 2 | at Western Illinois | | Hanson Field; Macomb, IL | W 27–17 | | |
| November 9 | Central Missouri State* | | Briggs Stadium; Springfield, MO | W 37–3 | 2,716 | |
| November 16 | at Nicholls State* | | John L. Guidry Stadium; Thibodaux, LA | L 28–31 | | |
*Non-conference game; Rankings from NCAA Division I-AA Football Committee Poll released prior to the game
