= 1985 Eastern Illinois Panthers football team =

American college football season

1985 Eastern Illinois Panthers football
- Conference: Gateway Collegiate Athletic Conference
- Record: 6–5 (2–3 GCAC)
- Head coach: Al Molde (3rd season)
- Home stadium: O'Brien Stadium

1985 Gateway Collegiate Athletic Conference football standings
	Conf.					Overall
Team	W		L		T	W		L		T
No. 4 Northern Iowa $^	5	–	0	–	0	11	–	2	–	0
Southwest Missouri State	2	–	2	–	1	6	–	4	–	1
Western Illinois	2	–	3	–	0	5	–	5	–	0
Southern Illinois	2	–	3	–	0	4	–	7	–	0
Eastern Illinois	2	–	3	–	0	6	–	5	–	0
Illinois State	1	–	3	–	1	6	–	3	–	2
$ – Conference champion; ^ – NCAA Division I-AA playoff participant; Rankings from NCAA Division I-AA Football Committee poll

The 1985 Eastern Illinois Panthers football team represented Eastern Illinois University as a member of the Gateway Collegiate Athletic Conference (GCAC) during the 1985 NCAA Division I-AA football season. Led by third-year head coach Al Molde, the Panthers compiled an overall record of 6–5 with a mark of 2–3 in conference play, tying for third place in the GCAC. Eastern Illinois played their home games at O'Brien Stadium in Charleston, Illinois.

== Schedule ==
Date	Opponent	Site	Result	Attendance	Source
September 7	at Northeast Missouri State*	Stokes Stadium; Kirksville, MO	L 24–31		
September 14	Indiana State*	O'Brien Stadium; Charleston, IL	W 39–7		
September 21	Saginaw Valley State*	O'Brien Stadium; Charleston, IL	W 35–27		
September 28	at Southern Illinois	McAndrew Stadium; Carbondale, IL	L 13–42	11,200	
October 5	at Kansas*	Memorial Stadium; Lawrence, KS	L 20–44	37,500	
October 12	Illinois State	O'Brien Stadium; Charleston, IL (rivalry)	W 21–14		
October 19	No. 15 Southwest Missouri State	O'Brien Stadium; Charleston, IL	W 28–27	4,065	
October 26	Western Illinois	O'Brien Stadium; Charleston, IL	L 20–34		
November 2	No. 14 (D-II) Northern Michigan*	O'Brien Stadium; Charleston, IL	W 27–12		
November 9	at No. 5 Northern Iowa	UNI-Dome; Cedar Falls, IA	L 20–21	10,875	
November 16	at Western Kentucky*	L. T. Smith Stadium; Bowling Green, KY	W 14–13	4,500	
*Non-conference game; Rankings from NCAA Division I-AA Football Committee Poll released prior to the game

== Roster ==
1985 Eastern Illinois Panthers football team roster
Players
Coaches
Offense

Pos.	#	Name	Class
WR	2	Roy Banks	Jr
OT	78	Chris Geile	Jr
QB	18	Sean Payton	Jr
OT	63	Dave Popp	Fr

Defense

Pos.	#	Name	Class
LB	98	Mel Black	Sr
LB	44	Rob DeVita	Jr

Special teams

Pos.	#	Name	Class
P	8	Evan Arapostathis	Sr

Head coach

- Al Molde

Coordinators/assistant coaches

Legend

- (C) Team captain
- (S) Suspended
- (I) Ineligible
- Injured
- Redshirt
