= 1985 Illinois State Redbirds football team =

American college football season

1985 Illinois State Redbirds football
- Conference: Gateway Collegiate Athletic Conference, Missouri Valley Conference
- Record: 6–3–2 (1–3–1 GCAC, 3–1–1 MVC)
- Head coach: Bob Otolski (5th season)
- Home stadium: Hancock Stadium

1985 Missouri Valley Conference football standings
	Conf.					Overall
Team	W		L		T	W		L		T
Tulsa $	5	–	0	–	0	6	–	5	–	0
West Texas State	3	–	1	–	1	6	–	3	–	1
Illinois State	3	–	1	–	1	6	–	3	–	2
Indiana State	3	–	2	–	0	4	–	6	–	0
Wichita State	2	–	3	–	0	3	–	8	–	0
Southern Illinois	1	–	3	–	0	4	–	7	–	0
Drake	1	–	5	–	0	4	–	7	–	0
$ – Conference champion; The conference was a hybrid of NCAA Division I-A and I-AA programs. Tulsa and Wichita State were I-A and the other teams were I-AA.

1985 Gateway Collegiate Athletic Conference football standings
	Conf.					Overall
Team	W		L		T	W		L		T
No. 4 Northern Iowa $^	5	–	0	–	0	11	–	2	–	0
Southwest Missouri State	2	–	2	–	1	6	–	4	–	1
Western Illinois	2	–	3	–	0	5	–	5	–	0
Southern Illinois	2	–	3	–	0	4	–	7	–	0
Eastern Illinois	2	–	3	–	0	6	–	5	–	0
Illinois State	1	–	3	–	1	6	–	3	–	2
$ – Conference champion; ^ – NCAA Division I-AA playoff participant; Rankings from NCAA Division I-AA Football Committee poll

The 1985 Illinois State Redbirds football team represented Illinois State Universityas a member of the Gateway Collegiate Athletic Conference (GCAC) and the Missouri Valley Conference (MVC) during the 1985 NCAA Division I-AA football season. In their fifth year under head coach Bob Otolski, the Redbirds compiled an overall record of 6–3–2 with marks of 1–3–1 in the GCAC, placing sixth, and 3–1–1 in MVC play, tying for second place. Illinois State played home games at Hancock Stadium in Normal, Illinois.

== Schedule ==
Date	Opponent	Rank	Site	Result	Attendance	Source
September 7	Western Illinois		Hancock Stadium; Normal, IL	W 18–6	9,867	
September 14	at Southwest Missouri State		Briggs Stadium; Springfield, MO	T 17–17		
September 21	Wayne State (MI)*		Hancock Stadium; Normal, IL	W 17–2		
September 28	UCF*	No. 12	Hancock Stadium; Normal, IL	W 48–21	12,786	
October 5	at Southern Illinois	No. 8	McAndrew Stadium; Carbondale, IL	L 0–21	13,200	
October 12	at Eastern Illinois		O'Brien Stadium; Charleston, IL (rivalry)	L 14–21		
October 19	West Texas State		Hancock Stadium; Normal, IL	T 29–29	8,036	
October 26	at Drake		Drake Stadium; Des Moines, IA	W 10–3	9,260	
November 2	No. T–5 Northern Iowa		Hancock Stadium; Normal, IL	L 3–15	4,847	
November 9	Wichita State		Hancock Stadium; Normal, IL	W 26–0	4,423	
November 16	Indiana State		Hancock Stadium; Normal, IL	W 24–21	4,206	
*Non-conference game; Rankings from NCAA Division I-AA Football Committee Poll released prior to the game
