= 1985 Drake Bulldogs football team =

American college football season

1985 Drake Bulldogs football
- Conference: Missouri Valley Conference
- Record: 4–7 (1–5 MVC)
- Head coach: Chuck Shelton (9th season)
- Defensive coordinator: Fred Bliel (2nd season)
- Home stadium: Drake Stadium

1985 Missouri Valley Conference football standings
	Conf.					Overall
Team	W		L		T	W		L		T
Tulsa $	5	–	0	–	0	6	–	5	–	0
West Texas State	3	–	1	–	1	6	–	3	–	1
Illinois State	3	–	1	–	1	6	–	3	–	2
Indiana State	3	–	2	–	0	4	–	6	–	0
Wichita State	2	–	3	–	0	3	–	8	–	0
Southern Illinois	1	–	3	–	0	4	–	7	–	0
Drake	1	–	5	–	0	4	–	7	–	0
$ – Conference champion; The conference was a hybrid of NCAA Division I-A and I-AA programs. Tulsa and Wichita State were I-A and the other teams were I-AA.

The 1985 Drake Bulldogs football team represented the Drake University as a member of the Missouri Valley Conference (MVC) during the 1985 NCAA Division I-AA football season. Led by ninth-year head coach Chuck Shelton, Drake compiled an overall record of 4–7 with a mark of 1–5 in conference play. By mid-October the team was 4–3, a record that included wins over in-state opponents Northern Iowa and Iowa State, but ended the season on a four-game skid. After the season, Drake announced it would drop its football program for the 1986 season and transition to NCAA Division III for the 1987 season.

== Schedule ==
Date	Time	Opponent	Site	Result	Attendance	Source
August 31		Southwest Missouri State*	Drake Stadium; Des Moines, IA	L 24–31	12,202	
September 7		Northern Iowa*	Drake Stadium; Des Moines, IA	W 24–9	14,718	
September 14	1:05 p.m.	at No. 5 Iowa*	Kinnick Stadium; Iowa City, IA	L 0–58	66,135	
September 21		Southern Illinois	Drake Stadium; Des Moines, IA	W 31–6	6,520	
September 28		at Indiana State	Memorial Stadium; Terre Haute, IN	L 10–17	9,290	
October 5		at Iowa State*	Cyclone Stadium; Ames, IA	W 20–17	42,008	
October 12	1:30 p.m.	UT Arlington*	Drake Stadium; Des Moines, IA	W 21–10	7,925	
October 19		at Wichita State	Cessna Stadium; Wichita, KS	L 21–24	8,302	
October 26	1:30 p.m.	Illinois State	Drake Stadium; Des Moines, IA	L 3–10	9,260	
November 2	1:30 p.m.	West Texas State	Drake Stadium; Des Moines, IA	L 27–28	8,075	
November 9		at Tulsa	Skelly Stadium; Tulsa, OK	L 15–45	12,872	
*Non-conference game; Rankings from AP Poll released prior to the game; All times are in Central time
