= 1985 Northern Iowa Panthers football team =

American college football season

1985 Northern Iowa Panthers football

GCAC champion

NCAA Division I-AA Semifinal, L 33–40 vs. Georgia Southern
- Conference: Gateway Collegiate Athletic Conference
- Record: 11–2 (5–0 GCAC)
- Head coach: Darrell Mudra (3rd season)
- Defensive coordinator: Dennis Remmert (15th season)
- Home stadium: UNI-Dome

1985 Gateway Collegiate Athletic Conference football standings
	Conf.					Overall
Team	W		L		T	W		L		T
No. 4 Northern Iowa $^	5	–	0	–	0	11	–	2	–	0
Southwest Missouri State	2	–	2	–	1	6	–	4	–	1
Western Illinois	2	–	3	–	0	5	–	5	–	0
Southern Illinois	2	–	3	–	0	4	–	7	–	0
Eastern Illinois	2	–	3	–	0	6	–	5	–	0
Illinois State	1	–	3	–	1	6	–	3	–	2
$ – Conference champion; ^ – NCAA Division I-AA playoff participant; Rankings from NCAA Division I-AA Football Committee poll

The 1985 Northern Iowa Panthers football team was an American football team that represented the University of Northern Iowa as a member of the Gateway Collegiate Athletic Conference (GCAC) during the 1985 NCAA Division I-AA football season. In its third season under head coach Darrell Mudra, the team compiled an 11–2 record (5–0 in conference games) and won the Gateway Conference championship. Northern Iowa advanced to the NCAA Division I-AA Football Championship playoffs, where, after a first-round bye, the Panthers defeated Eastern Washington in the quarterfinals before losing to the eventual national champion, Georgia Southern in the semifinals. The team gained an average of 438.8 yards of total offense per game and 519.3 all-purpose yards per game.

Cornerback Joe Fuller was selected as a first-team player on the 1985 Kodak Division I-AA football team. Quarterback Mike Smith was selected as the Gateway Confernce offensive player of the year, and linebacker Mark Farley was the Gateway Conference defensive player of the year. Five Northern Iowa players were honored as first-team players on the 1985 all-Gateway Conference football team: Fuller; Farley; defensive end Edward Grimes; defensive tackle Terry Orth; and cornerback Moses Aimable. Eight Northern Iowa players, including quarterback Mike Smith, were named to the second team. Aimable had nine quarterback hurries and four interceptions during the 1985 season, including a 100-yard interception return for touchdown against Western Illinois.

The team played its home games at the UNI-Dome in Cedar Falls, Iowa.

== Schedule ==
Date	Opponent	Rank	Site	Result	Attendance	Source
September 7	at Drake*		Drake Stadium; Des Moines, IA	L 9–24	14,718	
September 14	at Kansas State*		KSU Stadium; Manhattan, KS	W 10–6	17,550	
September 21	at Southwest Missouri State		Briggs Stadium; Springfield, MO	W 38–17	7,750	
September 28	No. 8 Delaware State*		UNI-Dome; Cedar Falls, IA	W 37–17	12,100	
October 5	at Western Illinois	No. 14	Hanson Field; Macomb, IL	W 48–14	5,438	
October 12	Indiana State	No. 12	UNI-Dome; Cedar Falls, IA	W 24–7	13,852	
October 26	Youngstown State*	No. 7	UNI-Dome; Cedar Falls, IA	W 50–26	14,330	
November 2	at Illinois State	No. T–5	Hancock Stadium; Normal, IL	W 15–3	4,847	
November 9	Eastern Illinois	No. 5	UNI-Dome; Cedar Falls, IA	W 21–20	10,875	
November 16	Northwest Missouri State*	No. 5	UNI-Dome; Cedar Falls, IA	W 49–0	12,107	
November 23	Northeast Missouri State*	No. 4	UNI-Dome; Cedar Falls, IA	W 41–24	12,107	
December 7	No. 11 Eastern Washington*	No. 4	UNI-Dome; Cedar Falls, IA (NCAA Division I-AA Quarterfinal)	W 17–14	6,220	
December 14	No. 9 Georgia Southern*	No. 4	UNI-Dome; Cedar Falls, IA (NCAA Division I-AA Semifinal)	L 33–40	12,300	
*Non-conference game; Rankings from NCAA Division I-AA Football Committee Poll released prior to the game
