= 1985 Southern Illinois Salukis football team =

American college football season

1985 Southern Illinois Salukis football
- Conference: Gateway Collegiate Athletic Conference, Missouri Valley Conference
- Record: 4–7 (2–3 GCAC, 1–4 MVC)
- Head coach: Ray Dorr (2nd season)
- Home stadium: McAndrew Stadium

1985 Gateway Collegiate Athletic Conference football standings
| | Conf. | | | | | Overall |
| Team | W | | L | | T | W | | L | | T |
|---|---|---|---|---|---|---|---|---|---|---|
| No. 4 Northern Iowa $^ | 5 | – | 0 | – | 0 | 11 | – | 2 | – | 0 |
| Southwest Missouri State | 2 | – | 2 | – | 1 | 6 | – | 4 | – | 1 |
| Western Illinois | 2 | – | 3 | – | 0 | 5 | – | 5 | – | 0 |
| Southern Illinois | 2 | – | 3 | – | 0 | 4 | – | 7 | – | 0 |
| Eastern Illinois | 2 | – | 3 | – | 0 | 6 | – | 5 | – | 0 |
| Illinois State | 1 | – | 3 | – | 1 | 6 | – | 3 | – | 2 |
$ – Conference champion; ^ – NCAA Division I-AA playoff participant; Rankings from NCAA Division I-AA Football Committee poll

1985 Missouri Valley Conference football standings
| | Conf. | | | | | Overall |
| Team | W | | L | | T | W | | L | | T |
|---|---|---|---|---|---|---|---|---|---|---|
| Tulsa $ | 5 | – | 0 | – | 0 | 6 | – | 5 | – | 0 |
| West Texas State | 3 | – | 1 | – | 1 | 6 | – | 3 | – | 1 |
| Illinois State | 3 | – | 1 | – | 1 | 6 | – | 3 | – | 2 |
| Indiana State | 3 | – | 2 | – | 0 | 4 | – | 6 | – | 0 |
| Wichita State | 2 | – | 3 | – | 0 | 3 | – | 8 | – | 0 |
| Southern Illinois | 1 | – | 3 | – | 0 | 4 | – | 7 | – | 0 |
| Drake | 1 | – | 5 | – | 0 | 4 | – | 7 | – | 0 |
$ – Conference champion; The conference was a hybrid of NCAA Division I-A and I-AA programs. Tulsa and Wichita State were I-A and the other teams were I-AA.

The 1985 Southern Illinois Salukis football team represented Southern Illinois University—now known as Southern Illinois University Carbondale—as a member of the Gateway Collegiate Athletic Conference (GCAC) and the Missouri Valley Conference (MVC) during the 1985 NCAA Division I-AA football season. Under second-year head coach Ray Dorr, the Salukis compiled an overall record of 4–7 with a mark of 2–3 in GCAC play, placing in a three-way tie for third. Southern Illinois had a record of 1–3 against MVC opponents, placing sixth. The team played its home games at McAndrew Stadium in Carbondale, Illinois.

== Schedule ==
| Date | Opponent | Site | Result | Attendance | Source |
|---|---|---|---|---|---|
| August 31 | Lincoln (MO)* | McAndrew Stadium; Carbondale, IL | W 63–0 | 10,500 | |
| September 7 | Southwest Missouri State | McAndrew Stadium; Carbondale, IL | L 28–40 | 9,600 | |
| September 14 | at Illinois* | Memorial Stadium; Champaign, IL | L 25–28 | 76,330 | |
| September 21 | at Drake | Drake Stadium; Des Moines, IA | L 6–31 | 6,520 | |
| September 28 | Eastern Illinois | McAndrew Stadium; Carbondale, IL | W 42–13 | 11,200 | |
| October 5 | No. 8 Illinois State | McAndrew Stadium; Carbondale, IL | W 21–0 | 13,200 | |
| October 19 | Southeast Missouri State* | McAndrew Stadium; Carbondale, IL | W 51–13 | 13,250 | |
| October 26 | at Wichita State | Cessna Stadium; Wichita, KS | L 34–35 | 7,473 | |
| November 2 | at Indiana State | Memorial Stadium; Terre Haute, IN | L 38–41 | 5,412 | |
| November 9 | at No. 8 Arkansas State* | Indian Stadium; Jonesboro, AR | L 12–41 | 10,104 | |
| November 16 | at Western Illinois | Hanson Field; Macomb, IL | L 7–14 | 1,478 | |
*Non-conference game; Rankings from NCAA Division I-AA Football Committee Poll released prior to the game
