= Allen Fieldhouse =

University of Kansas basketball arena

- "The Phog" "The Cathedral of Basketball"
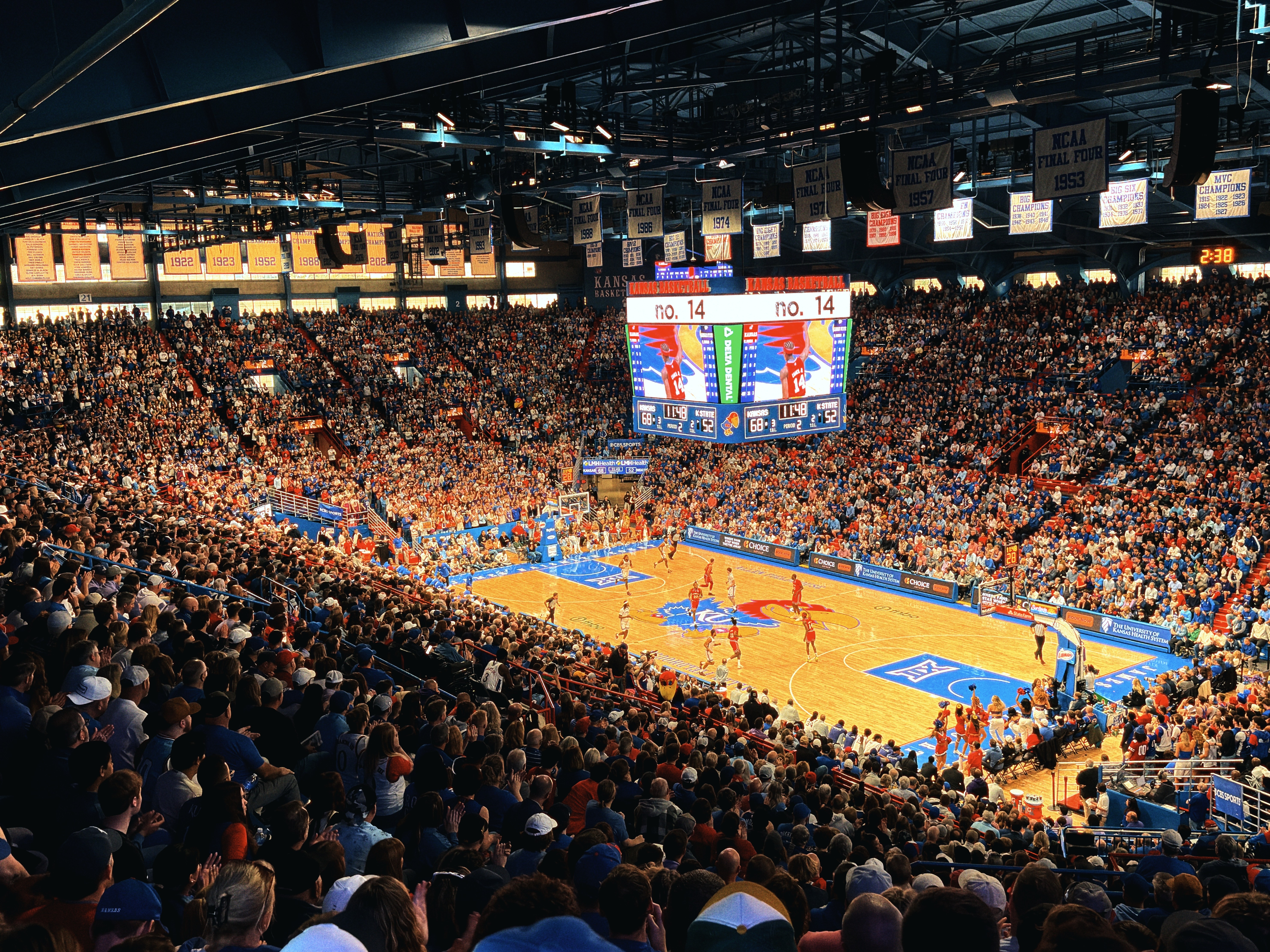
- The interior of Allen Fieldhouse March 2026
- Interactive map of Allen Fieldhouse
- Address: 1651 Naismith Drive; Lawrence, Kansas
- Coordinates: 38°57′15.5″N 95°15′8.62″W
- Owner: University of Kansas
- Operator: University of Kansas
- Capacity: 15,300 (2024–present); 16,300 (1994–2024); 15,800 (1986–1994); 15,200 (1964–1983); 17,000 (1955–64)
- Surface: Hardwood
- Record attendance: 17,228 (March 1, 1955) (opener vs. K-State)

Construction
- Groundbreaking: 1952
- Opened: March 1, 1955
- Renovated: 1986, 1994, 1999, 2001, 2024
- Expanded: 2009
- Cost: $2.5 million (original) ($30 million in 2025 dollars)
- Architect: Charles l. Marshall
- General contractor: Bennett Construction

Tenant
- Kansas Jayhawks (NCAA) (1955–present)

Website
- kuathletics.com/facilities/allen-fieldhouse/

Allen Fieldhouse is an indoor arena on the University of Kansas (KU) campus in Lawrence, Kansas. It is home of the Kansas Jayhawks men's and women's basketball teams. The arena is named after Phog Allen, a former player and head coach for the Jayhawks whose tenure lasted 39 years. The arena's nickname, The Phog also pays homage to Allen. Allen Fieldhouse is one of college basketball's most historically significant and prestigious buildings. 37 National Collegiate Athletic Association (NCAA) Tournament games have been hosted at the arena. The actual playing surface has been named "James Naismith Court", in honor of basketball's inventor, who established KU's basketball program and served as the Jayhawks' first coach from 1898 to 1907.

Allen Fieldhouse has also hosted several NCAA tournament regionals, an NBA exhibition game, and occasional concerts such as The Beach Boys, Elton John, James Taylor, Sonny and Cher, Leon Russell, Alice Cooper, ZZ Top, Tina Turner, Harry Belafonte, Henry Mancini, The Doobie Brothers, Kansas, and Bob Hope, as well as speakers, including former President Bill Clinton in 2004, Senator Robert F. Kennedy (which drew over 20,000) in March 1968, and anarchist Abbie Hoffman in 1970. Additional free musical performances occasionally occur during the Jayhawks Late Night In The Phog, musical artists that have performed for this include Tech N9ne, Lil Yachty, 2 Chainz, Snoop Dogg, Run-DMC, and DIESEL. Allen Fieldhouse was the filming location for a climactic hospital scene in the 1983 ABC-TV movie The Day After, one of the most-watched made-for-TV movies of all-time.

ESPN The Magazine named Allen Fieldhouse the loudest college basketball arena in the country. The arena broke the Guinness World Record for loudest roar on February 13, 2017, against West Virginia at 130.4 dB. The prior record of 126.4 dB at Kentucky's Rupp Arena which lasted less than three weeks also had many Kansas fans present as the Jayhawks beat the No. 4 Wildcats 79–73 in the Big 12/SEC Challenge. Arrowhead Stadium, which is only 42 miles away, owns the record for loudest outdoor stadium.

Allen Fieldhouse is often considered one of the best home court advantages in men's college basketball. Twenty times since the venue opened, the Jayhawks have finished the season undefeated at home. Through February 9, 2026, Kansas boasts an all-time record of 880-122 (.878)

== History ==
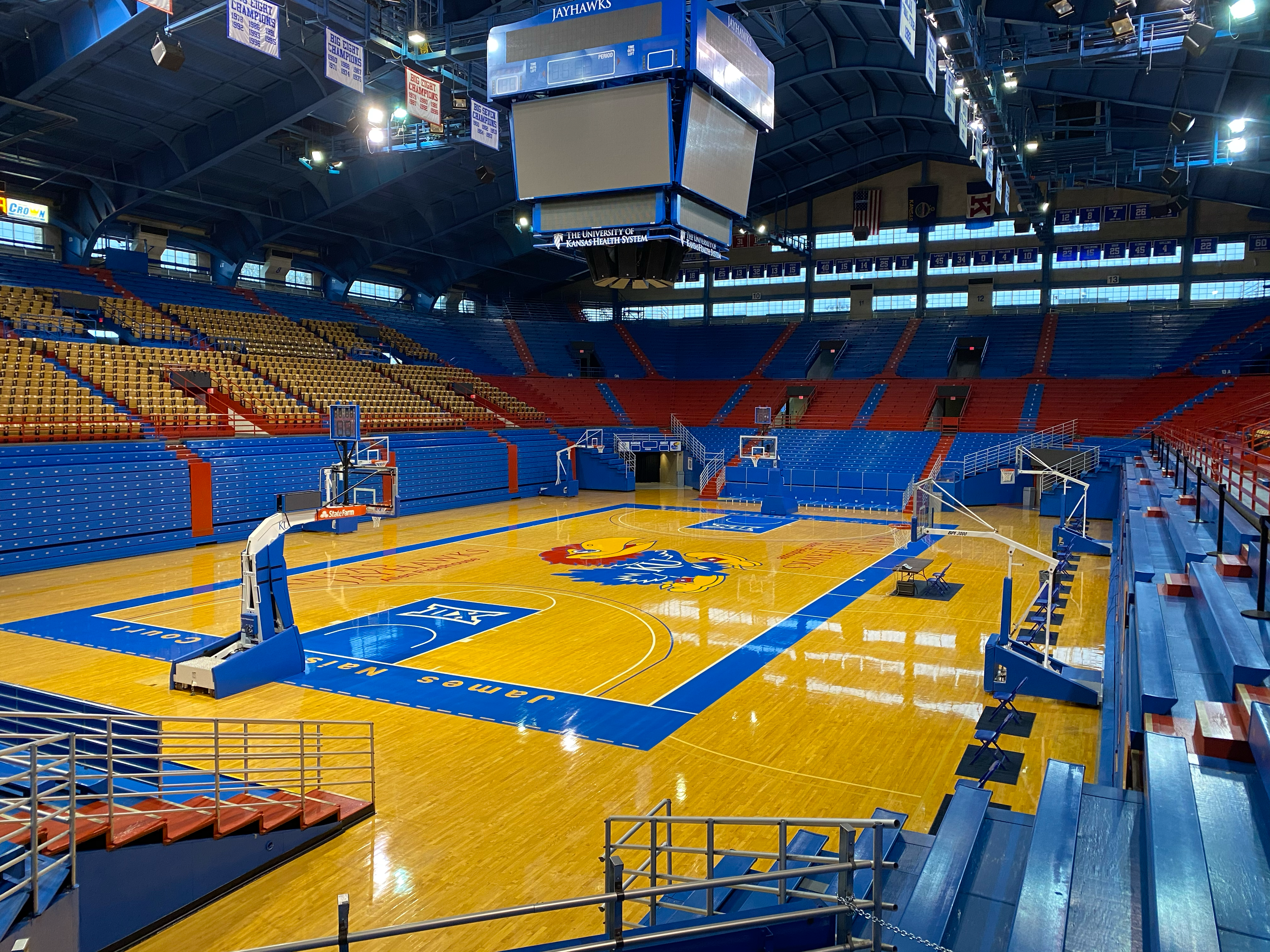
Allen Fieldhouse in 2021

The construction of Allen Fieldhouse began in 1952, but quickly ground to a halt because of a federal mandate restricting steel consumption following the Second World War and during the Korean War. However, university officials were able to find a loophole: by adding some rooms for gun and weapons storage, construction of the building was able to continue under the guise of an "armory."

Allen Fieldhouse was dedicated on March 1, 1955, a ten-point victory over rival Kansas State. Renovations have included minor seating expansions in 1986 and 1994, as well as accessibility upgrades in 1999 to modernize concession stands and restroom facilities, and to install an elevator in the south end. Handicapped seating was moved courtside behind both baskets in 2001.

The concourse was originally an indoor track. At times the Fieldhouse has been home to men's and women's basketball, indoor track and field, volleyball, wrestling and practice facilities for the American football and softball teams. Since additional facilities were constructed to accommodate many of those needs, it is now used primarily for basketball.

Max Falkenstien was a stalwart figure in the radio booth, working every home game in Allen Fieldhouse from its construction to his retirement in 2006, 51 years later.

Renovations completed in 2005 include a thorough cleaning of the exterior, and the creation of a new Booth Family Hall of Athletics facility on the east side of the Fieldhouse, funded by David G. Booth and his family. Interior renovations include a new hardwood court, new windows, and a multimillion-dollar video board and sound system. After 2006, new banners for the retired jerseys and conference and national championships were installed.

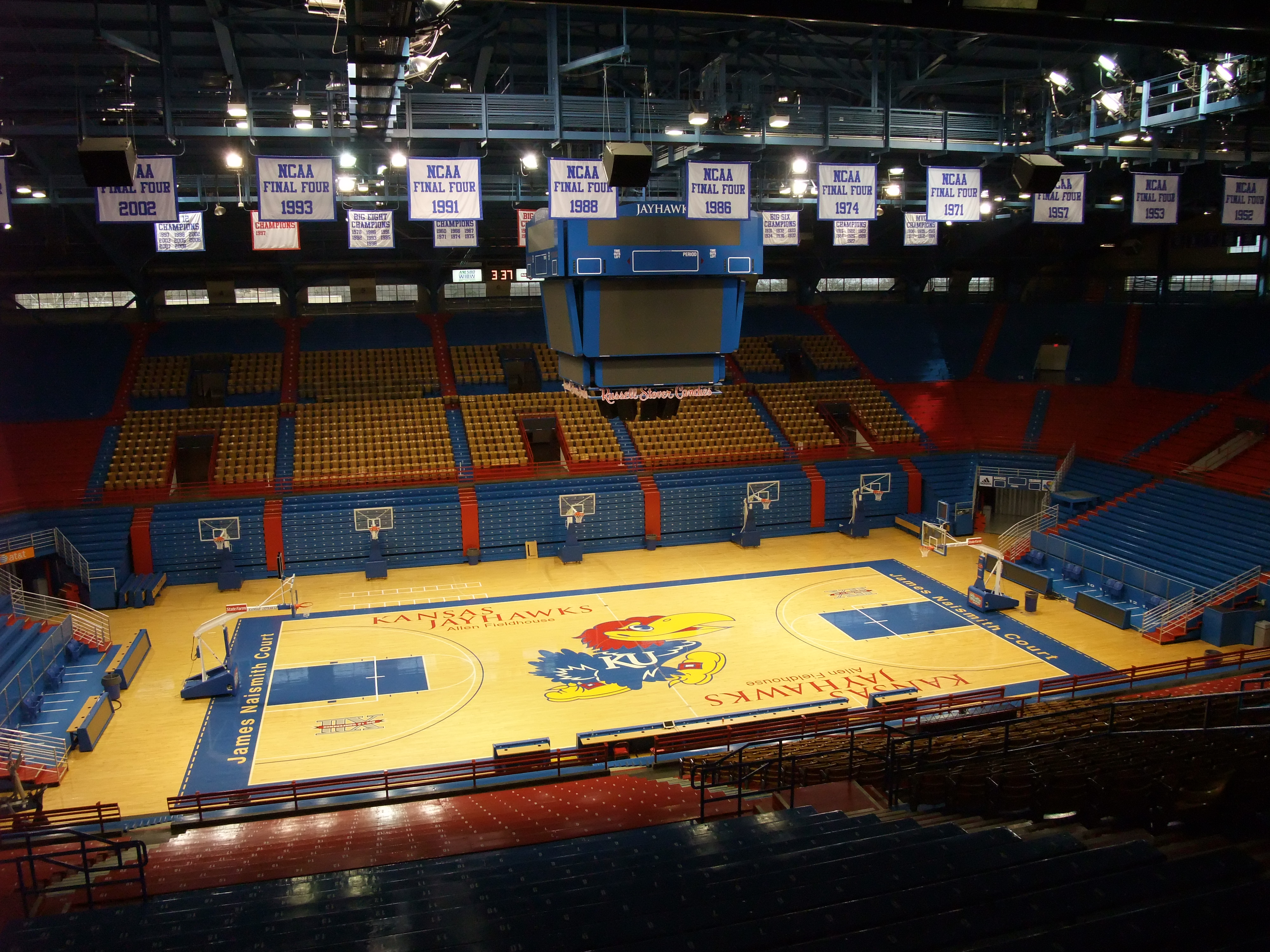
Allen Fieldhouse interior in 2009

Renovations completed in 2009 include an expansion of the Booth Family Hall of Athletics and the creation of a donor atrium, as well as improved concessions, wider concourses, and restroom upgrades. The building also received brand new locker rooms, training rooms, film rooms, and player lounges. A pedestrian bridge connecting the Fieldhouse to the existing facility parking garage was also constructed. The improvements cost approximately $7.8 million.

In December 2010, the Booth family announced they had purchased the founding document of the game of basketball, Naismith's original 13 Rules of Basketball. The document will be permanently housed in an addition to Allen Fieldhouse called the "DeBruce Center". The story behind the Booth family purchasing the document from a Sotheby's auction from the Naismith family was featured in an ESPN 30 for 30 documentary, including fending off a rival bidder who wanted to donate the document to his alma mater Duke University for a similar display at Cameron Indoor Stadium.

On September 24, 2011, an exhibition event called "Legends of the Phog" was held, in which various Kansas Jayhawks Basketball alumni played an exhibition game during the 2011 NBA lockout, including various former players such as Darnell Valentine, Paul Pierce, Nick Collison, Julian Wright, Mario Chalmers, Brandon Rush, Cole Aldrich, Marcus Morris and Markieff Morris. Former Kansas coaches Larry Brown and Ted Owens coached the opposing blue and white teams in front of a sold out crowd. The scrimmage ended with a tie of 111-111, without an overtime, with Chalmers scoring a three-pointer in the final seconds for the white team, which was compared to his famous shot in the 2008 championship game.

== Capacity ==
Allen Fieldhouse was built with a capacity of 17,000. During Ted Owens' coaching period (1964–83), the capacity was reduced to 15,200 to improve fire code-mandated egress routes. It was raised to 15,800 in the 1986 offseason, and to 16,300 in 1993. In 2024, renovations to include corner video boards and additional chair back seats reduced the capacity to 15,300.

There are 4,000 seats dedicated to KU students, with most of the remainder taken by season-ticket-holding members of the Williams Educational Fund, the fundraising arm of KU Athletics, named after Lawrence banker Dick Williams and his sons, Skipper and Odd. The largest crowd in Allen Fieldhouse for a basketball game was 17,228 on March 1, 1955, when the building was dedicated. Barring another expansion of seating, it is unlikely this record will ever be broken; in addition to the reduced capacity, more stringent fire codes have forced KU to strictly enforce the building's capacity since the mid-1980s.

== Banners ==
In lieu of retiring numbers, banners hang on the south wall of the fieldhouse to honor former men's and women's basketball players including Wilt Chamberlain, Clyde Lovellette, Jo Jo White, Danny Manning, Paul Pierce, Lynette Woodard, Drew Gooden, Nick Collison, Kirk Hinrich, among others. The banners display the player's surname over his/her number, but the numbers themselves are reused. There is also a banner to honor Max Falkenstien, a former Jayhawks radio announcer, who was given the "number" 60 to commemorate his 60 years of service to the university. To date he is the only non-athlete to be so honored at Allen Fieldhouse. The east and west rafters are devoted to KU's multiple Final Fours and conference championships.

On the north wall hang banners for KU's four national championships: their two championships awarded by the Helms Foundation for KU's 1922 and 1923 seasons, as well as their four NCAA tournament titles in 1952, 1988, 2008, and 2022. On the south wall hang banners for the Kansas women's basketball team's WNIT championship in 2023.

Above these championship banners hangs a banner reading "Pay Heed, All Who Enter: Beware of the Phog", in reference to the intimidating atmosphere and the team's home court dominance. The original "Pay Heed" banner was constructed out of dormitory shower curtains by a group of KU students before a late-season game against the Duke Blue Devils in 1988 and is now on display in the Booth Family Hall of Athletics museum. The slogan was inspired in part by advertisements for the 1980s horror movie The Fog. It hung on the north wall until 1999, by which time it had deteriorated to the point where it was about to fall. The university replaced the banner with a much more regular-looking design, which met with negative reaction from the public. The current banner was redesigned to be more faithful to the look of the original.

A banner reading "Just Load the Wagon" was hung on the west side of Allen Fieldhouse in 2022 to honor the father of Kansas head coach Bill Self after his passing that year. The phrase "just load the wagon" was a common word of encouragement that Self's father would say to him throughout his life.

== See also ==
- List of NCAA Division I basketball arenas
- List of basketball arenas

== Bibliography ==
- Kansas 2002–03 Basketball Media Guide. Topeka, Kansas: Mainline Printing, 2002.
- Kansas Jayhawks History-making basketball. Marceline, Missouri: Walsworth Publishing Company, 1991.
