= 1985 Western Illinois Leathernecks football team =

American college football season

1985 Western Illinois Leathernecks football
- Conference: Gateway Collegiate Athletic Conference
- Record: 5–5 (2–3 GCAC)
- Head coach: Bruce Craddock (3rd season)
- Home stadium: Hanson Field

1985 Gateway Collegiate Athletic Conference football standings
	Conf.					Overall
Team	W		L		T	W		L		T
No. 4 Northern Iowa $^	5	–	0	–	0	11	–	2	–	0
Southwest Missouri State	2	–	2	–	1	6	–	4	–	1
Western Illinois	2	–	3	–	0	5	–	5	–	0
Southern Illinois	2	–	3	–	0	4	–	7	–	0
Eastern Illinois	2	–	3	–	0	6	–	5	–	0
Illinois State	1	–	3	–	1	6	–	3	–	2
$ – Conference champion; ^ – NCAA Division I-AA playoff participant; Rankings from NCAA Division I-AA Football Committee poll

The 1985 Western Illinois Leathernecks football team represented Western Illinois University as a member of the Gateway Collegiate Athletic Conference (GCAC) during the 1985 NCAA Division I-AA football season. Led by third-year head coach Bruce Craddock, the Leathernecks compiled an overall record of 5–5, with a mark of 2–3 in conference play, and finished tied for third in the GCAC. The Leathernecks started the season 1 - 4, then finished the season 5 - 1 after freshman quarterback Paul Singer became the starter in game 5. Singer finished the season as the highest rated freshman quarterback in the country. Senior Running back Jeff McKinney was named academic All-American, and senior Barry Woodruff was named honorable mention all American punter.

== Schedule ==
Date	Opponent	Site	Result	Attendance	Source
September 7	at Illinois State	Hancock Stadium; Normal, IL	L 6–18	9,867	
September 21	Michigan Tech*	Hanson Field; Macomb, IL	W 55–20		
September 28	at No. 1 Richmond*	UR Stadium; Richmond, VA	L 20–38	16,102	
October 5	No. 14 Northern Iowa	Hanson Field; Macomb, IL	L 14–48	5,438	
October 12	Northern Michigan*	Hanson Field; Macomb, IL	W 14–7		
October 19	at Indiana State*	Memorial Stadium; Terre Haute, IN	L 42–24	11,786	
October 26	at Eastern Illinois	O'Brien Stadium; Charleston, IL	W 34–20		
November 2	Southwest Missouri State	Hanson Field; Macomb, IL	L 17–27		
November 9	Winona State*	Hanson Field; Macomb, IL	W 7–3		
November 16	Southern Illinois	Hanson Field; Macomb, IL	W 14–7	1,478	
*Non-conference game; Rankings from NCAA Division I-AA Football Committee Poll released prior to the game
