= 1985 Indiana State Sycamores football team =

American college football season

1985 Indiana State Sycamores football
- Conference: Missouri Valley Conference
- Record: 4–6 (3–2 MVC)
- Head coach: Dennis Raetz (6th season)
- Home stadium: Memorial Stadium

1985 Missouri Valley Conference football standings
	Conf.					Overall
Team	W		L		T	W		L		T
Tulsa $	5	–	0	–	0	6	–	5	–	0
West Texas State	3	–	1	–	1	6	–	3	–	1
Illinois State	3	–	1	–	1	6	–	3	–	2
Indiana State	3	–	2	–	0	4	–	6	–	0
Wichita State	2	–	3	–	0	3	–	8	–	0
Southern Illinois	1	–	3	–	0	4	–	7	–	0
Drake	1	–	5	–	0	4	–	7	–	0
$ – Conference champion; The conference was a hybrid of NCAA Division I-A and I-AA programs. Tulsa and Wichita State were I-A and the other teams were I-AA.

The 1985 Indiana State Sycamores football team represented Indiana State University as a member of the Missouri Valley Conference (MVC) during the 1985 NCAA Division I-AA football season. The Sycamores were led by sixth-year head coach Dennis Raetz and played their home games at Memorial Stadium. Indiana State finished the season 4–6 overall and 3–2 in MVC play to finish in fourth place.

== Schedule ==
Date	Opponent	Site	Result	Attendance	Source
September 7	St. Cloud State*	Memorial Stadium; Terre Haute, IN	W 31–14		
September 14	at Eastern Illinois*	O'Brien Stadium; Charleston, IL	L 7–39		
September 21	at Kansas*	Memorial Stadium; Lawrence, KS	L 10–37	38,500	
September 28	Drake	Memorial Stadium; Terre Haute, IN	W 17–10	9,290	
October 5	at West Texas State	Kimbrough Memorial Stadium; Canyon, TX	L 27–29		
October 12	at No. 12 Northern Iowa*	UNI-Dome; Cedar Falls, IA	L 7–24	13,852	
October 19	Western Illinois*^{†}	Memorial Stadium; Terre Haute, IN	W 24–42	11,786	
November 2	Southern Illinois	Memorial Stadium; Terre Haute, IN	W 41–38	5,412	
November 9	vs. Ball State*	Hoosier Dome; Indianapolis, IN (rivalry)	L 27–29	11,575	
November 16	at Illinois State	Hancock Stadium; Normal, IL	L 21–24	4,206	
*Non-conference game; ^{†}Homecoming; Rankings from NCAA Division I-AA Football Committee Poll released prior to the game
