= 1985 West Texas State Buffaloes football team =

American college football season

1985 West Texas State Buffaloes football
- Conference: Missouri Valley Conference
- Record: 6–3–1 (3–1–1 MVC)
- Head coach: Bill Kelly (1st season)
- Offensive coordinator: Steve Graf (1st season)
- Offensive scheme: West Coast
- Defensive coordinator: Paul Arslanian (1st season)
- Base defense: 3–4
- Home stadium: Kimbrough Memorial Stadium

1985 Missouri Valley Conference football standings
	Conf.					Overall
Team	W		L		T	W		L		T
Tulsa $	5	–	0	–	0	6	–	5	–	0
West Texas State	3	–	1	–	1	6	–	3	–	1
Illinois State	3	–	1	–	1	6	–	3	–	2
Indiana State	3	–	2	–	0	4	–	6	–	0
Wichita State	2	–	3	–	0	3	–	8	–	0
Southern Illinois	1	–	3	–	0	4	–	7	–	0
Drake	1	–	5	–	0	4	–	7	–	0
$ – Conference champion; The conference was a hybrid of NCAA Division I-A and I-AA programs. Tulsa and Wichita State were I-A and the other teams were I-AA.

The 1985 West Texas State Buffaloes football team was an American football team that represented West Texas State University—now known as West Texas A&M University—as a member of the Missouri Valley Conference (MVC) during the 1985 NCAA Division I-AA football season. In their first year under head coach Bill Kelly, the Buffaloes compiled an overall record of 6–3–1with a mark of 3–1–1 in conference play, tying for second place in the MVC.

== Schedule ==
Date	Opponent	Site	Result	Attendance	Source
September 7	at Abilene Christian*	Shotwell Stadium; Abilene, TX	L 18–25	9,000	
September 14	Angelo State*	Kimbrough Memorial Stadium; Canyon, TX	W 12–10	8,172	
September 21	Louisiana Tech*	Kimbrough Memorial Stadium; Canyon, TX	L 10–20	7,025	
September 28	Texas A&I*	Kimbrough Memorial Stadium; Canyon, TX	W 37–17		
October 5	Indiana State	Kimbrough Memorial Stadium; Canyon, TX	W 29–27		
October 12	Wichita State^{†}	Kimbrough Memorial Stadium; Canyon, TX	W 33–21	10,237	
October 19	at Illinois State	Hancock Stadium; Normal, IL	T 29–29	8,036	
October 26	at Tulsa	Skelly Stadium; Tulsa, OK	L 17–44	11,378	
November 2	at Drake	Drake Stadium; Des Moines, IA	W 28–27	8,075	
November 16	at New Mexico State*	Aggie Memorial Stadium; Las Cruces, NM	W 55–25	6,872	
*Non-conference game; ^{†}Homecoming
