= Sheldon Gaines =

American football player (born 1964)

No. 82
- Position: Wide receiver

Personal information
- Born: April 22, 1964 (age 62); Los Angeles, California, U.S.

Career information
- College: Long Beach State
- NFL draft: 1986: undrafted

Career history
- Buffalo Bills (1987); Winnipeg Blue Bombers (1987)

Career NFL statistics
- Receptions: 9
- Receiving yards: 115
- Touchdowns: 0
- Stats at Pro Football Reference

Sheldon L. Gaines (born April 22, 1964) is an American former professional football player who was a wide receiver for the Buffalo Bills of the National Football League (NFL) in 1987. He also played in the Canadian Football League (CFL) for the Winnipeg Blue Bombers.

Gaines attended Simi Valley High School but did not play varsity football there; he later played college football for the Moorpark Raiders and Long Beach State 49ers. He was the Moorpark most valuable player in 1984.
