= List of The Citadel Bulldogs football seasons =

The following is a list of The Citadel football seasons. The Citadel, The Military College of South Carolina is a member of the Southern Conference of the NCAA Division I. The Citadel did not sponsor football during the 1943, 1944, and 1945 seasons. The Citadel has won four Southern Conference Championships, played in and won one bowl game, and participated in the FCS Playoffs five times, with a record of 2–5 through the 2018 Playoffs.

Season	Conference	Head Coach	Total Wins	Total Losses	Total Ties	Conference Wins	Conference Losses	Conference Ties	Conference Standing	Postseason Result
1905	Independent	Sidney Smith	2	3	1	—	—	—	—	—
1906	Independent	Ralph Foster	3	0	0	—	—	—	—	—
1907	Independent	Ralph Foster	1	5	1	—	—	—	—	—
1908	Southern Intercollegiate	Ralph Foster	4	1	1	—	—	—	—	—
1909	Southern Intercollegiate	Sam Costen	4	3	2	0	1	1	—	—
1910	Southern Intercollegiate	Sam Costen	3	4	0	1	3	0	—	—
1911	Southern Intercollegiate	Louis LeTellier	5	2	2	1	2	0	—	—
1912	Southern Intercollegiate	Louis LeTellier	3	4	0	0	3	0	—	—
1913	Southern Intercollegiate	George C. Rogers	3	4	2	0	2	0	—	—
1914	Southern Intercollegiate	George C. Rogers	2	5	0	0	3	0	—	—
1915	Southern Intercollegiate	George C. Rogers	5	3	0	2	3	0	—	—
1916	Southern Intercollegiate	Harvey O'Brien	6	1	1	4	1	0	—	—
1917	Southern Intercollegiate	Harvey O'Brien	3	3	0	1	3	0	—	—
1918	Southern Intercollegiate	Harvey O'Brien	0	2	1	0	1	1	—	—
1919	Southern Intercollegiate	George C. Rogers	4	4	1	2	4	1	—	—
1920	Southern Intercollegiate	Harvey O'Brien	2	6	0	1	5	0	—	—
1921	Southern Intercollegiate	Harvey O'Brien	3	3	2	2	3	1	—	—
1922	Southern Intercollegiate	Carl Prause	3	5	0	1	2	0	—	—
1923	Southern Intercollegiate	Carl Prause	5	3	1	2	1	1	—	—
1924	Southern Intercollegiate	Carl Prause	6	4	0	4	2	0	—	—
1925	Southern Intercollegiate	Carl Prause	6	4	0	4	2	0	—	—
1926	Southern Intercollegiate	Carl Prause	7	3	0	4	3	0	—	—
1927	Southern Intercollegiate	Carl Prause	3	6	1	2	3	1	—	—
1928	Southern Intercollegiate	Carl Prause	6	3	1	3	3	0	—	—
1929	Southern Intercollegiate	Carl Prause	5	4	1	4	0	1	—	—
1930	Southern Intercollegiate	Johnny Floyd	4	5	2	3	0	1	—	—
1931	Southern Intercollegiate	Johnny Floyd	5	4	1	4	1	0	—	—
1932	Southern Intercollegiate	Tatum Gressette	4	5	0	2	2	0	—	—
1933	Southern Intercollegiate	Tatum Gressette	3	5	1	3	2	0	—	—
1934	Southern Intercollegiate	Tatum Gressette	3	5	1	2	2	0	—	—
1935	Southern Intercollegiate	Tatum Gressette	4	3	1	3	1	0	—	—
1936	Southern	Tatum Gressette	4	6	0	0	4	0	14	—
1937	Southern	Tatum Gressette	7	4	0	2	3	0	8	—
1938	Southern	Tatum Gressette	6	5	0	2	3	0	10	—
1939	Southern	Tatum Gressette	3	8	0	0	4	0	15	—
1940	Southern	Bo Rowland	4	5	0	0	4	0	15	—
1941	Southern	Bo Rowland	4	3	1	0	2	1	14	—
1942	Southern	Bo Rowland	5	2	0	2	2	0	8	—
1943	No Team									
1944	No Team									
1945	No Team									
1946	Southern	J. Quinn Decker	3	5	0	1	5	0	15	—
1947	Southern	J. Quinn Decker	3	5	0	1	4	0	12	—
1948	Southern	J. Quinn Decker	2	7	0	0	5	0	16	—
1949	Southern	J. Quinn Decker	4	5	0	2	2	0	7	—
1950	Southern	J. Quinn Decker	4	6	0	2	3	0	11	—
1951	Southern	J. Quinn Decker	4	6	0	1	3	0	14	—
1952	Southern	J. Quinn Decker	3	5	1	1	3	1	13	—
1953	Southern	John D. McMillan	2	7	0	1	3	0	9	—
1954	Southern	John D. McMillan	2	8	0	0	4	0	9	—
1955	Southern	John Sauer	5	4	0	2	2	0	5	—
1956	Southern	John Sauer	3	5	1	1	3	0	8	—
1957	Southern	Eddie Teague	5	4	1	4	2	0	3	—
1958	Southern	Eddie Teague	4	6	0	2	3	0	7	—
1959	Southern	Eddie Teague	8	2	0	5	1	0	2	—
1960	Southern	Eddie Teague	8	2	1	4	2	0	2	Tangerine Bowl
1961	Southern	Eddie Teague	7	3	0	5	1	0	1	—
1962	Southern	Eddie Teague	3	7	0	1	4	0	7	—
1963	Southern	Eddie Teague	4	6	0	2	4	0	7	—
1964	Southern	Eddie Teague	4	6	0	4	3	0	4	—
1965	Southern	Eddie Teague	2	8	0	2	6	0	8	—
1966	Southern	Red Parker	4	6	0	3	5	0	6	—
1967	Southern	Red Parker	5	6	0	2	4	0	7	—
1968	Southern	Red Parker	5	5	0	4	2	0	2	—
1969	Southern	Red Parker	7	3	0	4	2	0	3	—
1970	Southern	Red Parker	5	6	0	4	2	0	2	—
1971	Southern	Red Parker	8	3	0	4	2	0	3	—
1972	Southern	Red Parker	5	6	0	4	3	0	4	—
1973	Southern	Bobby Ross	3	8	0	1	6	0	7	—
1974	Southern	Bobby Ross	4	7	0	3	4	0	5	—
1975	Southern	Bobby Ross	6	5	0	4	3	0	4	—
1976	Southern	Bobby Ross	6	5	0	1	4	0	6	—
1977	Southern	Bobby Ross	5	6	0	3	2	0	3	—
1978	Southern	Art Baker	5	6	0	2	3	0	5	—
1979	Southern	Art Baker	6	5	0	4	2	0	3	—
1980	Southern	Art Baker	7	4	0	3	2	0	4	—
1981	Southern	Art Baker	7	3	1	3	2	1	4	—
1982	Southern	Art Baker	5	6	0	3	4	0	4	—
1983	Southern	Tom Moore	3	8	0	1	6	0	7	—
1984	Southern	Tom Moore	7	4	0	4	2	0	3	—
1985	Southern	Tom Moore	5	5	1	2	4	1	5	—
1986	Southern	Tom Moore	3	8	0	0	6	0	8	—
1987	Southern	Charlie Taaffe	4	7	0	1	5	0	8	—
1988	Southern	Charlie Taaffe	8	4	0	5	2	0	3	First Round
1989	Southern	Charlie Taaffe	5	5	1	1	5	1	8	—
1990	Southern	Charlie Taaffe	7	5	0	4	3	0	3	First Round
1991	Southern	Charlie Taaffe	7	4	0	5	2	0	2	—
1992	Southern	Charlie Taaffe	11	2	0	6	1	0	1	Quarterfinals
1993	Southern	Charlie Taaffe	5	6	0	4	4	0	4	—
1994	Southern	Charlie Taaffe	6	5	0	4	4	0	5	—
1995	Southern	Charlie Taaffe	2	9	0	0	8	0	8	—
1996	Southern	Don Powers	4	7	0	3	5	0	5	—
1997	Southern	Don Powers	6	5	0	4	4	0	4	—
1998	Southern	Don Powers	5	6	0	4	4	0	4	—
1999	Southern	Don Powers	2	9	0	1	7	0	8	—
2000	Southern	Don Powers	2	9	0	1	7	0	T-8	—
2001	Southern	Ellis Johnson	3	7	0	2	6	0	7	—
2002	Southern	Ellis Johnson	3	9	—	1	7	—	9	—
2003	Southern	Ellis Johnson	6	6	—	4	4	—	4	—
2004	Southern	John Zernhelt	3	7	—	2	5	—	T-5	—
2005	Southern	Kevin Higgins	4	7	—	2	5	—	7	—
2006	Southern	Kevin Higgins	5	6	—	4	3	—	4	—
2007	Southern	Kevin Higgins	7	4	—	4	3	—	T-3	—
2008	Southern	Kevin Higgins	4	8	—	2	6	—	7	—
2009	Southern	Kevin Higgins	4	7	—	2	6	—	7	—
2010	Southern	Kevin Higgins	3	8	—	1	7	—	T-8	—
2011	Southern	Kevin Higgins	4	7	—	2	6	—	8	—
2012	Southern	Kevin Higgins	7	4	—	5	3	—	T-4	—
2013	Southern	Kevin Higgins	5	7	—	4	4	—	T-4	—
2014	Southern	Mike Houston	5	7	—	3	4	—	5th	—
2015	Southern	Mike Houston	9	4	—	6	1	—	T-1	Second Round
2016	Southern	Brent Thompson	10	2	—	8	0	—	1	Second Round
2017	Southern	Brent Thompson	5	6	—	3	5	—	T-6	—
2018	Southern	Brent Thompson	5	6	—	4	4	—	T-5	—
2019	Southern	Brent Thompson	6	6	—	4	4	—	T-4	—
2020	Southern	Brent Thompson	2	10	—	2	6	—	7	—
2021	Southern	Brent Thompson	4	7	—	3	5	—	T-7	—
2022	Southern	Brent Thompson	4	7	—	3	5	—	T-7	—
2023	Southern	Maurice Drayton	0	11	—	0	8	—	9	—
2024	Southern	Maurice Drayton	5	7	—	3	5	—	T-6	—
2025	Southern	Maurice Drayton	4	8	—	3	5	—	7	—
2026	Southern	Maurice Drayton	3	9	—	1	7	—	8	—
Totals: 114 Seasons	2 Conferences	24 Head Coaches	Total Wins 535	Total Losses 626	Total Ties 32	282 Conference Wins 55 SIAA 227 SoCon	398 Conference Losses 58 SIAA 340 SoCon	11 Conference Ties 8 SIAA 5 SoCon	Regular season Champions 4 times	1–0 Bowl Record 2–5 Playoff Record
