= List of The Citadel Bulldogs head football coaches =

The Citadel Bulldogs football program is a college football team that represents The Citadel, The Military College of South Carolina in the Southern Conference. The Bulldogs compete in the National Collegiate Athletic Association (NCAA) Division I Football Championship Subdivision.

The first season of football at The Citadel was in 1905. The team has had twenty-five different head coaches, with two serving for two separate stretches of time. There was no team from 1943 through 1945 due to World War II.

The Bulldogs have appeared in and won one bowl game, the 1960 Tangerine Bowl under head coach Eddie Teague. They have also made five appearances in the NCAA Division I-AA (now FCS) Playoffs, holding an overall record of 2–5. The first three appearances were under head coach Charlie Taaffe, while the others were led by Mike Houston and Brent Thompson. The Citadel has claimed four Southern Conference championships, in 1961 under the leadership of Teague, in 1992 under Taaffe, in 2015 under Houston, and 2016 under Thompson. The Bulldogs have not won a national championship in football.

Through the end of the 2018 season, Charlie Taaffe has coached the most games for the Bulldogs, and claimed the most wins. He and Mike Houston are the only coaches to lead the team and win a game in the Division I-AA playoffs. Kevin Higgins recorded the most losses in Citadel history and second most games overall, just one behind Taaffe. After three seasons, Brent Thompson has the highest winning percentage at .588, while John D. McMillan has the lowest winning percentage at .225.

Taaffe earned National Coach of the Year honors in 1992, from Sports Information Directors in the Eddie Robinson Award, The Sports Network, and from the American Football Coaches Association. Six coaches have earned Southern Conference Coach of the Year honors: Teague (1961), Tom Moore (1984), Taaffe (1988 and 1992), Higgins (2012), Houston (2015), and Thompson (2016). Additionally, John Sauer and Teague earned South Carolina Coach of the Year awards in 1955 and 1961, respectively.

== Key ==
Key to symbols in coaches list
| General | | Overall | | Conference | | Postseason (Note: Although the first Rose Bowl Game was played in 1902, it has been continuously played since the 1916 game, and is recognized as the oldest bowl game by the NCAA. "—" indicates any season prior to 1916 when postseason games were not played.) | |
|---|---|---|---|---|---|---|---|
| No. | Order of coaches (Note: A running total of the number of head coaches, with coaches who served separate tenures being counted only once. Interim head coaches are represented with "Int" and are not counted in the running total. "—" indicates the team played but either without a coach or no coach is on record. "X" indicates an interim year without play.) | GC | Games coached | CW | Conference wins | PW | Postseason wins |
| DC | Division championships | OW | Overall wins | CL | Conference losses | PL | Postseason losses |
| CC | Conference championships | OL | Overall losses | CT | Conference ties | PT | Postseason ties |
| NC | National championships | OT | Overall ties (Note: Overtime rules in college football were introduced in 1996, making ties impossible in the period since.) | C% | Conference winning percentage | | |
| † | Elected to the College Football Hall of Fame | O% | Overall winning percentage (Note: When computing the win–loss percentage, a tie counts as half a win and half a loss.) | | | | |

== Coaches ==
List of head football coaches showing season(s) coached, overall records, conference records, postseason records, championships and selected awards (Note: Statistics correct as of the end of the 2024 NCAA Division I FCS football season.)
| No. | Name | Term(s) | GC | OW | OL | OT | O% | CW | CL | CT | C% | PW | PL | DCs | CCs | NCs | Awards |
|---|---|---|---|---|---|---|---|---|---|---|---|---|---|---|---|---|---|
| 1 | Syd Smith | 1905 | 6 | 2 | 3 | 1 | .417 | — | — | — | — | — | — | — | — | 0 | — |
| 2 | Ralph Foster | 1906–1908 | 16 | 8 | 6 | 2 | .563 | — | — | — | — | — | — | — | 0 | 0 | — |
| 3 | Sam Costen | 1909–1910 | 16 | 7 | 7 | 2 | .500 | 1 | 4 | 1 | .250 | — | — | — | 0 | 0 | — |
| 4 | Louis LeTellier | 1911–1912 | 16 | 8 | 6 | 2 | .563 | 1 | 5 | 0 | .167 | — | — | — | 0 | 0 | — |
| 5 | George C. Rogers | 1913–1915, 1919 | 33 | 14 | 16 | 3 | .470 | 4 | 12 | 1 | .265 | 0 | 0 | — | 0 | 0 | — |
| 6 | Harry J. O'Brien | 1916–1918, 1920–1921 | 33 | 14 | 15 | 4 | .485 | 8 | 13 | 2 | .391 | 0 | 0 | — | 0 | 0 | — |
| 7 | Carl Prause | 1922–1929 | 77 | 41 | 32 | 4 | .558 | 24 | 16 | 3 | .593 | 0 | 0 | — | 0 | 0 | — |
| 8 | Johnny Floyd | 1930–1931 | 15 | 9 | 9 | 3 | .500 | 7 | 1 | 1 | .833 | 0 | 0 | — | 0 | 0 | — |
| 9 | Tatum Gressette | 1932–1939 | 78 | 34 | 41 | 3 | .455 | 14 | 21 | 0 | .400 (Note: Gressette had a record of 10–7 (.588) against Southern Intercollegiate Athletic Association opponents and 4–14 (.222) against Southern Conference opponents.) | 0 | 0 | — | 0 | 0 | — |
| 10 | Bo Rowland | 1940–1942 | 24 | 13 | 10 | 1 | .563 | 2 | 8 | 1 | .227 | 0 | 0 | — | 0 | 0 | — |
| 11 | J. Quinn Decker | 1946–1952 | 65 | 23 | 39 | 1 | .373 | 8 | 25 | 0 | .242 | 0 | 0 | — | 0 | 0 | — |
| 12 | John D. McMillan | 1953–1954 | 20 | 4 | 15 | 1 | .225 | 1 | 7 | 0 | .125 | 0 | 0 | — | 0 | 0 | — |
| 13 | John Sauer | 1955–1956 | 18 | 8 | 9 | 1 | .472 | 3 | 5 | 0 | .375 | 0 | 0 | — | 0 | 0 | 1955 South Carolina Coach of the Year |
| 14 | Eddie Teague | 1957–1965 | 91 | 45 | 44 | 2 | .505 | 29 | 26 | 0 | .527 | 1 | 0 | — | 1 | 0 | 1955 South Carolina Coach of the Year; 1961 Southern Conference Coach of the Year |
| 15 | Red Parker | 1966–1972 | 73 | 39 | 34 | 0 | .534 | 25 | 20 | 0 | .556 | 0 | 0 | — | 0 | 0 | — |
| 16 | Bobby Ross | 1973–1977 | 55 | 24 | 31 | 0 | .436 | 11 | 19 | 0 | .367 | 0 | 0 | — | 0 | 0 | — |
| 17 | Art Baker | 1978–1982 | 55 | 30 | 24 | 1 | .555 | 15 | 13 | 1 | .330 | 0 | 0 | — | 0 | 0 | — |
| 18 | Tom Moore | 1983–1986 | 44 | 18 | 25 | 1 | .420 | 7 | 18 | 1 | .288 | 0 | 0 | — | 0 | 0 | 1984 Southern Conference Coach of the Year |
| 19 | Charlie Taaffe | 1987–1995 | 103 | 55 | 47 | 1 | .539 | 30 | 34 | 1 | .469 | 1 | 3 | — | 1 | 0 | 1988 Southern Conference Coach of the Year; 1992 Eddie Robinson Award; 1992 The Sports Network Coach of the Year; 1992 AFCA Division I-AA Coach of the Year; 1992 SC Hall of Fame Coach of the Year; 1992 Southern Conference Coach of the Year |
| 20 | Don Powers | 1996–2000 | 55 | 19 | 36 | — | .345 | 13 | 27 | — | .325 | 0 | 0 | — | 0 | 0 | — |
| 21 | Ellis Johnson | 2001–2003 | 34 | 12 | 22 | — | .353 | 7 | 17 | — | .292 | 0 | 0 | — | 0 | 0 | — |
| 22 | John Zernhelt | 2004 | 10 | 3 | 7 | — | .300 | 2 | 5 | — | .286 | 0 | 0 | — | 0 | 0 | — |
| 23 | Kevin Higgins | 2005–2013 | 102 | 43 | 57 | — | .430 | 26 | 43 | — | .377 | 0 | 0 | — | 0 | 0 | 2012 Southern Conference Coach of the Year |
| 24 | Mike Houston | 2014–2015 | 25 | 14 | 11 | — | .560 | 9 | 5 | — | .643 | 1 | 1 | — | 1 | 0 | 2015 Southern Conference Coach of the Year |
| 25 | Brent Thompson | 2016–2022 | 80 | 36 | 44 | — | .450 | 27 | 29 | — | .482 | 0 | 1 | — | 1 | 0 | 2016 Southern Conference Coach of the Year |
| 26 | Maurice Drayton | 2023–present | 47 | 12 | 35 | — | .255 | 7 | 25 | — | .219 | 0 | 0 | — | 0 | 0 | — |
