= 1985 The Citadel Bulldogs football team =

American college football season

1985 The Citadel Bulldogs football
- Conference: Southern Conference
- Record: 5–5–1 (3–4–1 SoCon)
- Head coach: Tom Moore (3rd season)
- Home stadium: Johnson Hagood Stadium

1985 Southern Conference football standings
	Conf.					Overall
Team	W		L		T	W		L		T
No. T–2 Furman $^	6	–	0	–	0	12	–	2	–	0
No. T–12 Appalachian State	6	–	1	–	0	8	–	3	–	0
Chattanooga	5	–	2	–	0	6	–	5	–	0
Marshall	3	–	3	–	1	7	–	3	–	1
The Citadel	2	–	4	–	1	5	–	5	–	1
Western Carolina	2	–	4	–	1	4	–	6	–	1
VMI	1	–	4	–	1	3	–	7	–	1
East Tennessee State	0	–	7	–	0	0	–	10	–	1
Davidson	0	–	2	–	0	1	–	10	–	0
$ – Conference champion; ^ – NCAA Division I-AA playoff participant; Rankings from NCAA Division I-AA Football Committee poll

The 1985 The Citadel Bulldogs football team represented The Citadel, The Military College of South Carolina in the 1985 NCAA Division I-AA football season. Tom Moore served as a head coach for the third season. The Bulldogs played as members of the Southern Conference and played home games at Johnson Hagood Stadium.

== Schedule ==
Date	Opponent	Site	Result	Attendance	Source
August 31	at No. 17 (I-A) South Carolina*	Williams–Brice Stadium; Columbia, SC	L 17–56	73,500	
September 7	Presbyterian*	Johnson Hagood Stadium; Charleston, SC	W 14–7	18,000	
September 21	Appalachian State	Johnson Hagood Stadium; Charleston, SC	L 3–14	16,246	
September 28	at No. 3 Marshall	Fairfield Stadium; Huntington, WV	L 14–17	17,527	
October 5	at VMI	Alumni Memorial Field; Lexington, VA (Military Classic of the South)	T 14–14	5,500	
October 12	Davidson	Johnson Hagood Stadium; Charleston, SC	W 31–0	8,741	
October 19	at Chattanooga	Chamberlain Field; Chattanooga, TN	L 17–34	7,993	
October 26	at East Tennessee State	Memorial Center; Johnson City, TN	W 28–21	8,154	
November 2	Western Carolina	Johnson Hagood Stadium; Charleston, SC	W 10–3	14,157	
November 9	Wofford*	Johnson Hagood Stadium; Charleston, SC (rivalry)	W 42–28	10,867	
November 16	No. 2 Furman^{†}	Johnson Hagood Stadium; Charleston, SC (rivalry)	L 0–42	20,592	
*Non-conference game; ^{†}Homecoming; Rankings from NCAA Division I-AA Football Committee Poll released prior to the game
