= 1985 VMI Keydets football team =

American college football season

1985 VMI Keydets football
- Conference: Southern Conference
- Record: 3–7–1 (1–4–1 SoCon)
- Head coach: Eddie Williamson (1st season)
- Home stadium: Alumni Memorial Field

1985 Southern Conference football standings
	Conf.					Overall
Team	W		L		T	W		L		T
No. T–2 Furman $^	6	–	0	–	0	12	–	2	–	0
No. T–12 Appalachian State	6	–	1	–	0	8	–	3	–	0
Chattanooga	5	–	2	–	0	6	–	5	–	0
Marshall	3	–	3	–	1	7	–	3	–	1
The Citadel	2	–	4	–	1	5	–	5	–	1
Western Carolina	2	–	4	–	1	4	–	6	–	1
VMI	1	–	4	–	1	3	–	7	–	1
East Tennessee State	0	–	7	–	0	0	–	10	–	1
Davidson	0	–	2	–	0	1	–	10	–	0
$ – Conference champion; ^ – NCAA Division I-AA playoff participant; Rankings from NCAA Division I-AA Football Committee poll

The 1985 VMI Keydets football team was an American football team that represented the Virginia Military Institute (VMI) as a member of the Southern Conference (SoCon) during the 1985 NCAA Division I-AA football season. In their first year under head coach Eddie Williamson, the team compiled an overall record of 3–7–1 with a mark of 1–4–1 in conference play, placing seventh in the SoCon. Williamson was hired from Georgia in December 1984 to succeed Bob Thalman as head coach of the Keydets.

== Schedule ==
Date	Opponent	Site	Result	Attendance	Source
September 14	at Virginia*	Scott Stadium; Charlottesville, VA	L 15–40	37,500	
September 21	Richmond*	Alumni Memorial Field; Lexington, VA (rivalry)	L 14–28	6,800	
September 28	at North Carolina*	Kenan Memorial Stadium; Chapel Hill, NC	L 7–51	49,250	
October 5	The Citadel	Alumni Memorial Field; Lexington, VA (rivalry)	T 14–14	5,500	
October 12	East Tennessee State	Alumni Memorial Field; Lexington, VA	W 23–19	5,900	
October 19	at Marshall	Fairfield Stadium; Huntington, WV	L 16–21	17,815	
October 26	William & Mary*	Alumni Memorial Field; Lexington, VA (rivalry)	W 39–38	5,700	
November 2	at Appalachian State	Conrad Stadium; Boone, NC	L 10–26	4,600	
November 9	James Madison*	Alumni Memorial Field; Lexington, VA	W 14–7	5,900	
November 16	at Chattanooga	Chamberlain Field; Chattanooga, TN	L 7–54	5,652	
November 23	at Western Carolina	E. J. Whitmire Stadium; Cullowhee, NC	L 30–35	6,160	
*Non-conference game
