= 1960 The Citadel Bulldogs football team =

American college football season

1960 The Citadel Bulldogs football

Tangerine Bowl champion

Tangerine Bowl, W 27–0 vs Tennessee Tech
- Conference: Southern Conference
- Record: 8–2–1 (4–2 SoCon)
- Head coach: Eddie Teague (4th season)
- Home stadium: Johnson Hagood Stadium

1960 Southern Conference football standings
	Conf.					Overall
Team	W		L		T	W		L		T
VMI $	4	–	1	–	0	7	–	2	–	1
The Citadel	4	–	2	–	0	8	–	2	–	1
George Washington	4	–	2	–	0	5	–	3	–	1
Virginia Tech	4	–	2	–	0	6	–	4	–	0
Furman	2	–	2	–	0	5	–	4	–	1
Richmond	3	–	4	–	1	3	–	6	–	1
Davidson	1	–	3	–	0	3	–	5	–	0
William & Mary	1	–	5	–	0	2	–	8	–	0
West Virginia	0	–	2	–	1	0	–	8	–	2
$ – Conference champion

The 1960 The Citadel Bulldogs football team represented The Citadel, The Military College of South Carolina in the 1960 college football season. The Bulldogs were led by fourth-year head coach Eddie Teague and played their home games at Johnson Hagood Stadium. They played as members of the Southern Conference, as they have since 1936. In 1960, The Citadel won in its first and only bowl appearance in the Tangerine Bowl.

== Schedule ==
Date	Time	Opponent	Site	Result	Attendance	Source
September 17		Newberry*	Johnson Hagood Stadium; Charleston, SC	W 19–0	13,000	
September 24	7:00 pm	at George Washington	Washington-Lee High School; Arlington, VA	L 14–19		
October 1		at Davidson	Richardson Stadium; Davidson, NC	W 21–15	6,000	
October 8		Florida State*	Johnson Hagood Stadium; Charleston, SC	T 0–0	12,000	
October 15		at Richmond	City Stadium; Richmond, VA	W 24–12	6,000	
October 22		at Furman	Sirrine Stadium; Greenville, SC (rivalry)	W 7–6	10,000	
October 29		Presbyterian	Johnson Hagood Stadium; Charleston, SC	W 27–0	13,000	
November 5		William & Mary	Johnson Hagood Stadium; Charleston, SC	W 14–0	9,000	
November 12		VMI^{†}	Johnson Hagood Stadium; Charleston, SC (rivalry)	L 6–20	14,000	
November 19		at Arkansas State*	Kays Stadium; Jonesboro, AR	W 22–21	5,000	
December 30	8:00 pm	vs. Tennessee Tech*	Tangerine Bowl; Orlando, FL (Tangerine Bowl)	W 27–0	13,200	
*Non-conference game; ^{†}Homecoming; All times are in Eastern time

== Game summaries ==
=== George Washington ===
Team	1	2	3	4	Total
Bulldogs	0	0	0	14	14
• Colonials	6	6	0	7	19

- Date: September 24, 1960
- Location: Washington-Lee High School, Arlington, Virginia
- Game start: 7:00 PM

Scoring summary
1		GW	Wilt 1–yard run (kick failed)	GW 6–0
2	:55	GW	Packan 9–yard run (kick failed)	GW 12–0
4		CIT	Eastburn 13–yard pass from Nettles (Gilgo kick)	GW 12–7
4		CIT	Edwards 48–yard pass from Nettles (Gilgo kick)	CIT 14–12
4	1:55	GW	Fredecine 1–yard run (Corbin kick)	GW 19–14

=== Tennessee Tech ===
Team	1	2	3	4	Total
Golden Eagles	0	0	0	0	0
• Bulldogs	7	0	13	7	27

- Date: December 30, 1960
- Location: Citrus Bowl, Orlando, Florida
- Game start: 8:00 PM
- Game attendance: 13,000

Scoring summary
1	CIT	Allen 7–yard pass from Nettles (Gilgo kick)	CIT 7–0
3	CIT	Edwards 56–yard run (kick failed)	CIT 13–0
3	CIT	Gilgo 7–yard pass from Nettles (Gilgo kick)	CIT 20–0
4	CIT	Mitchell 1–yard run (Gilgo kick)	CIT 27–0

== NFL Draft selections ==
Year	Round	Pick	Overall	Name	Team	Position
1960	15	1	169	Harry Rakowski	Los Angeles Rams	Center
1960	17	2	194	Joe Davis	Chicago Cardinals (became St. Louis Cardinals after this draft)	Tackle

== AFL Draft selections ==
Year	Round	Pick	Overall	Name	Team	Position
1960	First Selection	—	—	Pete Davidson	Los Angeles Chargers	Tackle/Guard
1960	First Selection	—	—	Paul Maguire	Los Angeles Chargers	End
1960	First Selection	—	—	Wayne Stewart	Los Angeles Chargers	Tackle/Guard
1960	Second Selection	—	—	Joe Davis	Los Angeles Chargers	Tackle
1960	Second Selection	—	—	Harry Rakowski	Buffalo Bills	Center
