= 1960 Furman Purple Hurricane football team =

American college football season

1960 Furman Purple Hurricane football
- Conference: Southern Conference
- Record: 5–4–1 (2–2 SoCon)
- Head coach: Bob King (3rd season)
- Captains: Sam Taylor; Shelly Sutton; Don Kemp; Marvin Behlk; Joe Oliff
- Home stadium: Sirrine Stadium

1960 Southern Conference football standings
	Conf.					Overall
Team	W		L		T	W		L		T
VMI $	4	–	1	–	0	7	–	2	–	1
The Citadel	4	–	2	–	0	8	–	2	–	1
George Washington	4	–	2	–	0	5	–	3	–	1
Virginia Tech	4	–	2	–	0	6	–	4	–	0
Furman	2	–	2	–	0	5	–	4	–	1
Richmond	3	–	4	–	1	3	–	6	–	1
Davidson	1	–	3	–	0	3	–	5	–	0
William & Mary	1	–	5	–	0	2	–	8	–	0
West Virginia	0	–	2	–	1	0	–	8	–	2
$ – Conference champion

The 1960 Furman Purple Hurricane football team was an American football team that represented Furman University as a member of the Southern Conference (SoCon) during the 1960 college football season. In their third season under head coach Bob King, Furman compiled a 5–4–1 record.

== Schedule ==
Date	Opponent	Site	Result	Attendance	Source
September 17	Presbyterian*	Sirrine Stadium; Greenville, SC	W 20–12	9,000	
September 24	at Tampa*	Phillips Field; Tampa, FL	T 7–7	5,500	
October 8	William & Mary	Sirrine Stadium; Greenville, SC	W 25–23	3,000	
October 15	Wofford*	Sirrine Stadium; Greenville, SC (rivalry)	W 41–26	9,500	
October 22	The Citadel	Sirrine Stadium; Greenville, SC (rivalry)	L 6–7	10,000	
October 29	Mississippi College*	Sirrine Stadium; Greenville, SC	W 33–20	10,000	
November 5	at Alabama*	Denny Stadium; Tuscaloosa, AL	L 0–51	20,000	
November 11	Richmond	Sirrine Stadium; Greenville, SC	L 28–35		
November 19	at Davidson	Richardson Stadium; Davidson, NC	W 22–21	7,000	
November 26	at Clemson	Memorial Stadium; Clemson, SC	L 14–42	23,000	
*Non-conference game
