= 1985 Furman Paladins football team =

American college football season

1985 Furman Paladins football

SoCon champion

NCAA Division I-AA Championship Game, L 42–44 vs. Georgia Southern
- Conference: Southern Conference
- Record: 12–2 (6–0 SoCon)
- Head coach: Dick Sheridan (8th season)
- Captains: Gene Reeder; Chas Fox; Bobby Lamb
- Home stadium: Paladin Stadium

1985 Southern Conference football standings
	Conf.					Overall
Team	W		L		T	W		L		T
No. T–2 Furman $^	6	–	0	–	0	12	–	2	–	0
No. T–12 Appalachian State	6	–	1	–	0	8	–	3	–	0
Chattanooga	5	–	2	–	0	6	–	5	–	0
Marshall	3	–	3	–	1	7	–	3	–	1
The Citadel	2	–	4	–	1	5	–	5	–	1
Western Carolina	2	–	4	–	1	4	–	6	–	1
VMI	1	–	4	–	1	3	–	7	–	1
East Tennessee State	0	–	7	–	0	0	–	10	–	1
Davidson	0	–	2	–	0	1	–	10	–	0
$ – Conference champion; ^ – NCAA Division I-AA playoff participant; Rankings from NCAA Division I-AA Football Committee poll

The 1985 Furman Paladins football team was an American football team that represented Furman University as a member of the Southern Conference (SoCon) during the 1985 NCAA Division I-AA football season. In their eighth year under head coach Dick Sheridan, the Paladins compiled an overall record of 12–2 with a conference mark of 6–0, winning the SoCon title. Furman advanced to the NCAA Division I-AA Football Championship playoffs, where they defeated Rhode Island in the quarterfinals, Nevada in the semifinals, and were upset by Georgia Southern in the NCAA Division I-AA Championship Game.

== Schedule ==
Date	Opponent	Rank	Site	Result	Attendance	Source
September 7	at South Carolina State*		State College Stadium; Orangeburg, SC	W 38–31		
September 14	Newberry*		Paladin Stadium; Greenville, SC	L 21–24		
September 21	at Western Carolina		Whitmire Stadium; Cullowhee, NC	W 31–27	12,635	
September 28	at NC State*	No. 18	Carter–Finley Stadium; Raleigh, NC	W 42–20	36,600	
October 5	at Davidson*^{A}	No. 10	Richardson Stadium; Davidson, NC	W 58–7	4,000	
October 12	No. 7 Marshall	No. 9	Paladin Stadium; Greenville, SC	W 34–3	11,072	
October 19	East Tennessee State	No. 5	Paladin Stadium; Greenville, SC	W 35–31		
October 26	No. 15 Appalachian State	No. 5	Paladin Stadium; Greenville, SC	W 21–7	12,224	
November 2	Mars Hill*	No. 2	Paladin Stadium; Greenville, SC	W 34–10	13,854	
November 16	at The Citadel	No. 2	Johnson Hagood Stadium; Charleston, SC (rivalry)	W 42–0	20,592	
November 23	Chattanooga	No. 2	Paladin Stadium; Greenville, SC	W 28–0	13,134	
December 7	No. 7 Rhode Island*	No. 2	Paladin Stadium; Greenville, SC (NCAA Division I-AA Quarterfinal)	W 59–15	9,454	
December 14	at No. T–2 Nevada*	No. T–2	Paladin Stadium; Greenville, SC (NCAA Division I-AA Semifinal)	W 35–12	10,461	
December 21	vs. No. 9 Georgia Southern*	No. T–2	Tacoma Dome; Tacoma, WA (NCAA Division I-AA Championship Game)	L 42–44	5,306	
*Non-conference game; Rankings from NCAA Division I-AA Football Committee Poll released prior to the game

A.Before the start of the season, Southern Conference directors elected to make this game count as a conference game for Davidson, but not for Furman.
