= 1985 Appalachian State Mountaineers football team =

American college football season

1985 Appalachian State Mountaineers football
- Conference: Southern Conference
- Record: 8–3 (6–1 SoCon)
- Head coach: Sparky Woods (2nd season)
- Home stadium: Conrad Stadium

1985 Southern Conference football standings
	Conf.					Overall
Team	W		L		T	W		L		T
No. T–2 Furman $^	6	–	0	–	0	12	–	2	–	0
No. T–12 Appalachian State	6	–	1	–	0	8	–	3	–	0
Chattanooga	5	–	2	–	0	6	–	5	–	0
Marshall	3	–	3	–	1	7	–	3	–	1
The Citadel	2	–	4	–	1	5	–	5	–	1
Western Carolina	2	–	4	–	1	4	–	6	–	1
VMI	1	–	4	–	1	3	–	7	–	1
East Tennessee State	0	–	7	–	0	0	–	10	–	1
Davidson	0	–	2	–	0	1	–	10	–	0
$ – Conference champion; ^ – NCAA Division I-AA playoff participant; Rankings from NCAA Division I-AA Football Committee poll

The 1985 Appalachian State Mountaineers football team was an American football team that represented Appalachian State University as a member of the Southern Conference (SoCon) during the 1985 NCAA Division I-AA football season. In their second year under head coach Sparky Woods, the Mountaineers compiled an overall record of 8–3 with a mark of 6–1 in conference play, placing second in the SoCon.

== Schedule ==
Date	Opponent	Rank	Site	Result	Attendance	Source
September 7	at No. 18 (I-A) South Carolina*		Williams–Brice Stadium; Columbia, SC	L 13–20	73,100	
September 14	Western Kentucky*		Conrad Stadium; Boone, NC	W 31–14	13,707	
September 21	at The Citadel		Johnson Hagood Stadium; Charleston, SC	W 14–3	16,246	
September 28	at Wake Forest*	No. 16	Groves Stadium; Winston-Salem, NC	L 21–24	27,300	
October 12	Chattanooga		Conrad Stadium; Boone, NC	W 25–0	20,284	
October 19	James Madison*	No. T–19	Conrad Stadium; Boone, NC	W 36–0	14,007	
October 26	at No. 5 Furman	No. 15	Paladin Stadium; Greenville, SC	L 7–21	12,224	
November 2	VMI		Conrad Stadium; Boone, NC	W 26–10	4,600	
November 9	at Western Carolina		Whitmire Stadium; Cullowhee, NC (rivalry)	W 27–14	12,218	
November 16	Marshall		Conrad Stadium; Boone, NC (rivalry)	W 40–0	8,355	
November 23	at East Tennessee State	No. 17	Memorial Center; Johnson City, TN	W 20–3	7,450	
*Non-conference game; Rankings from NCAA Division I-AA Football Committee Poll released prior to the game
