= 1960 West Virginia Mountaineers football team =

American college football season

1960 West Virginia Mountaineers football
- Conference: Southern Conference
- Record: 0–8–2 (0–2–1 SoCon)
- Head coach: Gene Corum (1st season)
- Home stadium: Mountaineer Field

1960 Southern Conference football standings
	Conf.					Overall
Team	W		L		T	W		L		T
VMI $	4	–	1	–	0	7	–	2	–	1
The Citadel	4	–	2	–	0	8	–	2	–	1
George Washington	4	–	2	–	0	5	–	3	–	1
Virginia Tech	4	–	2	–	0	6	–	4	–	0
Furman	2	–	2	–	0	5	–	4	–	1
Richmond	3	–	4	–	1	3	–	6	–	1
Davidson	1	–	3	–	0	3	–	5	–	0
William & Mary	1	–	5	–	0	2	–	8	–	0
West Virginia	0	–	2	–	1	0	–	8	–	2
$ – Conference champion

The 1960 West Virginia Mountaineers football team represented West Virginia University as a member of the Southern Conference (SoCon) during the 1960 college football season. Led by first-year head coach Gene Corum, the Mountaineers compiled an overall record of 0–8–2 with a mark of 0–2–1 in conference play, placing last out of nine teams in the SoCon.

== Schedule ==
Date	Opponent	Site	Result	Attendance	Source
September 17	Maryland*	Mountaineer Field; Morgantown, WV (rivalry)	L 8–31	18,000	
September 24	vs. Virginia Tech	City Stadium; Richmond, VA (Tobacco Bowl, rivalry)	L 0–15	19,000	
October 1	at No. 4 Illinois*	Memorial Stadium; Champaign, IL	L 0–33	43,612	
October 8	Richmond	Mountaineer Field; Morgantown, WV	T 6–6	10,000	
October 15	at Pittsburgh*	Pitt Stadium; Pittsburgh, PA (rivalry)	L 0–42	31,813	
October 22	No. 3 Syracuse*	Mountaineer Field; Morgantown, WV (rivalry)	L 0–45	20,000	
October 29	at Penn State*	Beaver Stadium; University Park, PA (rivalry)	L 13–34	35,600–37,715	
November 5	Boston University*	Mountaineer Field; Morgantown, WV	T 7–7	3,000	
November 12	at Oregon*	Multnomah Stadium; Portland, OR	L 6–20	11,864	
November 19	George Washington	Mountaineer Field; Morgantown, WV	L 0–26	10,000	
*Non-conference game; Rankings from AP Poll released prior to the game

== Roster ==
1960 West Virginia Mountaineers football team roster
Players			Coaches
Offense: Pos. / # / Name / Class; / / Harry Carr	Defense: Pos. / # / Name / Class	Special teams: Pos. / # / Name / Class	Head coach: Gene Corum; Coordinators/assistant coaches Legend: (C) Team captain; (S) Suspended; (I) Ineligible; Injured; Redshirt
