= Gene Corum =

American football player and coach (1921–2010)

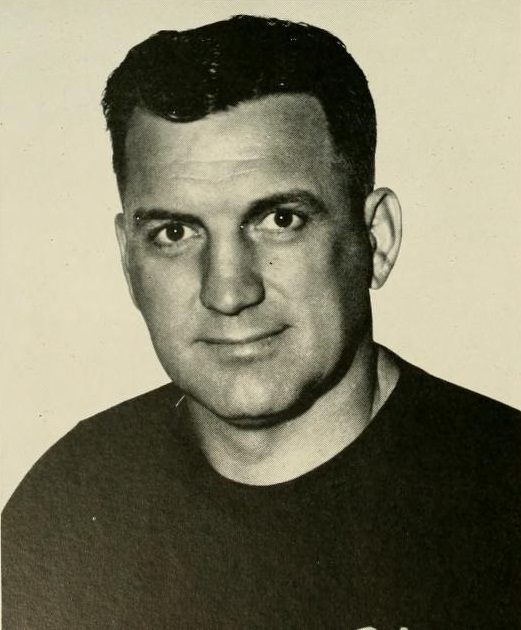
- Corum pictured in The Monticola 1963, West Virginia yearbook

Biographical details
- Born: May 29, 1921; Huntington, West Virginia, U.S.
- Died: January 2, 2010 (aged 88); Frederick, Maryland, U.S.

Playing career
- 1941–1942: West Virginia
- 1945: Fort Benning
- 1946–1947: West Virginia
- Position: Guard

Coaching career (HC unless noted)
- 1948–1949: Point Marion HS (PA)
- 1950–1959: West Virginia (ends)
- 1960–1965: West Virginia

Head coaching record
- Overall: 29–30–2 (college)
- Bowls: 0–1

Accomplishments and honors

Championships
- 2 SoCon (1964–1965)

Earl Eugene Corum (May 29, 1921 – January 2, 2010) was an American football player and coach. He served as the head football coach at West Virginia University from 1960 to 1965, compiling a record of 29–30–2. Corum played college football as a guard at West Virginia in the 1940s and graduated in 1948. He began his coaching career at Point Marion High School in Point Marion, Pennsylvania for two seasons before returning to West Virginia as an assistant coach in 1950.

Corum was inducted into the West Virginia University Sports Hall of Fame in 1984. He died on January 2, 2010, in Frederick, Maryland, at the age of 88.

== Head coaching record ==
=== College ===
Year	Team	Overall	Conference	Standing	Bowl/playoffs
West Virginia Mountaineers (Southern Conference) (1960–1965)
1960	West Virginia	0–8–2	0–2–1	9th	
1961	West Virginia	4–6	2–1	T–3rd	
1962	West Virginia	8–2	4–0	2nd	
1963	West Virginia	4–6	3–1	2nd	
1964	West Virginia	7–4	5–0	1st	L Liberty
1965	West Virginia	6–4	4–0	1st	
West Virginia:		29–30–2	18–4–1		
Total:		29–30–2			
National championship Conference title Conference division title or championship game berth
