= 1960 Richmond Spiders football team =

American college football season

1960 Richmond Spiders football
- Conference: Southern Conference
- Record: 3–6–1 (3–4–1 SoCon)
- Head coach: Ed Merrick (10th season)
- Captains: Bob Buffman; John Boggs
- Home stadium: City Stadium

1960 Southern Conference football standings
	Conf.					Overall
Team	W		L		T	W		L		T
VMI $	4	–	1	–	0	7	–	2	–	1
The Citadel	4	–	2	–	0	8	–	2	–	1
George Washington	4	–	2	–	0	5	–	3	–	1
Virginia Tech	4	–	2	–	0	6	–	4	–	0
Furman	2	–	2	–	0	5	–	4	–	1
Richmond	3	–	4	–	1	3	–	6	–	1
Davidson	1	–	3	–	0	3	–	5	–	0
William & Mary	1	–	5	–	0	2	–	8	–	0
West Virginia	0	–	2	–	1	0	–	8	–	2
$ – Conference champion

The 1960 Richmond Spiders football team was an American football team that represented the University of Richmond as a member of the Southern Conference (SoCon) during the 1960 college football season. In their tenth season under head coach Ed Merrick, Richmond compiled a 3–6–1 record, with a mark of 3–4–1 in conference play, finishing in sixth place in the SoCon.

== Schedule ==
Date	Opponent	Site	Result	Attendance	Source
September 17	at Florida State*	Doak Campbell Stadium; Tallahassee, FL	L 0–28	17,000	
October 1	at VMI	Wilson Field; Lexington, VA (rivalry)	L 6–21	6,500	
October 8	at West Virginia	Mountaineer Field; Morgantown, WV	T 6–6	10,000	
October 15	The Citadel	City Stadium; Richmond, VA	L 12–24	6,000	
October 22	at Davidson	Richardson Stadium; Davidson, NC	W 35–6	5,000	
October 29	Virginia Tech	City Stadium; Richmond, VA	L 0–20	6,500	
November 4	at George Washington	Griffith Stadium; Washington, DC	L 0–16	6,000	
November 11	at Furman	Sirrine Stadium; Greenville, SC	W 35–28		
November 19	at East Carolina*	College Stadium; Greenville, NC	L 7–22		
November 24	William & Mary	City Stadium; Richmond, VA (rivalry)	W 19–0		
*Non-conference game
