= 1985 Western Carolina Catamounts football team =

American college football season

1985 Western Carolina Catamounts football
- Conference: Southern Conference
- Record: 4–6–1 (2–4–1 SoCon)
- Head coach: Bob Waters (17th season)
- Home stadium: E. J. Whitmire Stadium

1985 Southern Conference football standings
| | Conf. | | | | | Overall |
| Team | W | | L | | T | W | | L | | T |
|---|---|---|---|---|---|---|---|---|---|---|
| No. T–2 Furman $^ | 6 | – | 0 | – | 0 | 12 | – | 2 | – | 0 |
| No. T–12 Appalachian State | 6 | – | 1 | – | 0 | 8 | – | 3 | – | 0 |
| Chattanooga | 5 | – | 2 | – | 0 | 6 | – | 5 | – | 0 |
| Marshall | 3 | – | 3 | – | 1 | 7 | – | 3 | – | 1 |
| The Citadel | 2 | – | 4 | – | 1 | 5 | – | 5 | – | 1 |
| Western Carolina | 2 | – | 4 | – | 1 | 4 | – | 6 | – | 1 |
| VMI | 1 | – | 4 | – | 1 | 3 | – | 7 | – | 1 |
| East Tennessee State | 0 | – | 7 | – | 0 | 0 | – | 10 | – | 1 |
| Davidson | 0 | – | 2 | – | 0 | 1 | – | 10 | – | 0 |
$ – Conference champion; ^ – NCAA Division I-AA playoff participant; Rankings from NCAA Division I-AA Football Committee poll

The 1985 Western Carolina Catamounts team was an American football team that represented Western Carolina University as a member of the Southern Conference (SoCon) during the 1985 NCAA Division I-AA football season. In their 17th year under head coach Bob Waters, the team compiled an overall record of 4–6–1, with a mark of 2–4–1 in conference play, and finished tied for fifth in the SoCon.

== Schedule ==
| Date | Opponent | Rank | Site | Result | Attendance | Source |
|---|---|---|---|---|---|---|
| September 7 | at Davidson* | | Richardson Stadium; Davidson, NC | W 13–0 | 4,200 | |
| September 14 | at Tennessee Tech* | | Tucker Stadium; Cookeville, TN | W 30–3 | | |
| September 21 | Furman | | E. J. Whitmire Stadium; Cullowhee, NC | L 27–31 | 12,635 | |
| September 28 | East Tennessee State | No. 19 | E. J. Whitmire Stadium; Cullowhee, NC | W 13–3 | | |
| October 5 | at No. 3 Marshall | No. 12 | Fairfield Stadium; Huntington, WV | T 10–10 | 17,357 | |
| October 12 | at Georgia Tech* | No. 14 | Grant Field; Atlanta, GA | L 17–24 | 36,111 | |
| October 26 | Chattanooga | | E. J. Whitmire Stadium; Cullowhee, NC | L 3–23 | 11,765 | |
| November 2 | at The Citadel | | Johnson Hagood Stadium; Charleston, SC | L 3–10 | 14,157 | |
| November 9 | Appalachian State | | E. J. Whitmire Stadium; Cullowhee, NC (rivalry) | L 14–27 | 12,218 | |
| November 16 | at No. 15 (I-A) Florida State* | | Doak Campbell Stadium; Tallahassee, FL | L 10–50 | 52,778 | |
| November 23 | VMI | | E. J. Whitmire Stadium; Cullowhee, NC | W 35–30 | 6,160 | |
*Non-conference game; Rankings from NCAA Division I-AA Football Committee Poll released prior to the game
