= 1985 Chattanooga Moccasins football team =

American college football season

1985 Chattanooga Moccasins football
- Conference: Southern Conference
- Record: 6–5 (5–2 SoCon)
- Head coach: Buddy Nix (2nd season)
- Captains: Brent Johnson; Glen Richardson
- Home stadium: Chamberlain Field

1985 Southern Conference football standings
	Conf.					Overall
Team	W		L		T	W		L		T
No. T–2 Furman $^	6	–	0	–	0	12	–	2	–	0
No. T–12 Appalachian State	6	–	1	–	0	8	–	3	–	0
Chattanooga	5	–	2	–	0	6	–	5	–	0
Marshall	3	–	3	–	1	7	–	3	–	1
The Citadel	2	–	4	–	1	5	–	5	–	1
Western Carolina	2	–	4	–	1	4	–	6	–	1
VMI	1	–	4	–	1	3	–	7	–	1
East Tennessee State	0	–	7	–	0	0	–	10	–	1
Davidson	0	–	2	–	0	1	–	10	–	0
$ – Conference champion; ^ – NCAA Division I-AA playoff participant; Rankings from NCAA Division I-AA Football Committee poll

The 1985 Chattanooga Moccasins football team represented the University of Tennessee at Chattanooga as a member of the Southern Conference (SoCon) in the 1985 NCAA Division I-AA football season. The Moccasins were led by second-year head coach Buddy Nix and played their home games at Chamberlain Field. They finished the season 6–5 overall and 5–2 in SoCon play to place third.

== Schedule ==
Date	Opponent	Rank	Site	Result	Attendance	Source
September 7	at Vanderbilt*		Vanderbilt Stadium; Nashville, TN	L 0–7	41,057	
September 21	at East Tennessee State		Memorial Center; Johnson City, TN	W 12–0	8,744	
September 28	Georgia Southern*		Chamberlain Field; Chattanooga, TN	L 14–19	8,892	
October 5	Southeastern Louisiana*^{†}		Chamberlain Field; Chattanooga, TN	W 27–7	9,148	
October 12	at Appalachian State		Conrad Stadium; Boone, NC	L 0–25	20,284	
October 19	The Citadel		Chamberlain Field; Chattanooga, TN	W 34–17	7,993	
October 26	at Western Carolina		Whitmire Stadium; Cullowhee, NC	W 23–3	11,765	
November 2	No. 11 Marshall		Chamberlain Field; Chattanooga, TN	W 38–7	8,369	
November 9	at Georgia Tech*	No. 20	Grant Field; Atlanta, GA	L 7–35	25,763	
November 16	VMI		Chamberlain Field; Chattanooga, TN	W 54–7	5,652	
November 23	at No. 2 Furman		Paladin Stadium; Greenville, SC	L 0–28	13,134	
*Non-conference game; ^{†}Homecoming; Rankings from NCAA Division I-AA Football Committee Poll released prior to the game
