= 1985 Davidson Wildcats football team =

American college football season

1985 Davidson Wildcats football
- Conference: Southern Conference
- Record: 1–10 (0–6 SoCon)
- Head coach: Vic Gatto (1st season)
- Home stadium: Richardson Stadium

1985 Southern Conference football standings
	Conf.					Overall
Team	W		L		T	W		L		T
No. T–2 Furman $^	6	–	0	–	0	12	–	2	–	0
No. T–12 Appalachian State	6	–	1	–	0	8	–	3	–	0
Chattanooga	5	–	2	–	0	6	–	5	–	0
Marshall	3	–	3	–	1	7	–	3	–	1
The Citadel	2	–	4	–	1	5	–	5	–	1
Western Carolina	2	–	4	–	1	4	–	6	–	1
VMI	1	–	4	–	1	3	–	7	–	1
East Tennessee State	0	–	7	–	0	0	–	10	–	1
Davidson	0	–	2	–	0	1	–	10	–	0
$ – Conference champion; ^ – NCAA Division I-AA playoff participant; Rankings from NCAA Division I-AA Football Committee poll

The 1985 Davidson Wildcats football team represented Davidson College as a member of the Southern Conference during the 1985 NCAA Division I-AA football season. Led by first-year head coach Vic Gatto, the Wildcats compiled an overall record of 1–10 with a mark of 0–6 in conference play, placing eighth out of nine teams in the SoCon. Although not SoCon members, their games against Bucknell, Penn, and James Madison were designated Southern Conference games.

== Schedule ==
Date	Opponent	Site	Result	Attendance	Source
September 7	Western Carolina	Richardson Stadium; Davidson, NC	L 0–13	4,200	
September 14	Gardner–Webb*	Richardson Stadium; Davidson, NC	L 14–49	2,800	
September 21	at Bucknell	Memorial Stadium; Lewisburg, PA	L 14–34	4,500	
September 28	at Newberry*	Setzler Field; Newberry, SC	L 0–41	3,500	
October 5	No. 10 Furman	Richardson Stadium; Davidson, NC	L 7–58	4,000	
October 12	at The Citadel	Johnson Hagood Stadium; Charleston, SC	L 0–31	8,741	
October 19	Penn	Richardson Stadium; Davidson, NC	L 0–15	3,000	
October 26	at James Madison	JMU Stadium; Harrisonburg, VA	L 0–28	14,000	
November 2	at Wofford*	Snyder Field; Spartanburg, SC	W 21–17		
November 9	West Virginia Tech*	Richardson Stadium; Davidson, NC	L 10–35	700	
November 16	Catawba*	Richardson Stadium; Davidson, NC	L 28–35	300	
*Non-conference game; Rankings from NCAA Division I-AA Football Committee Poll released prior to the game
