= 1960 VMI Keydets football team =

American college football season

1960 VMI Keydets football

SoCon champion
- Conference: Southern Conference
- Record: 7–2–1 (4–1 SoCon)
- Head coach: John McKenna (8th season)
- Home stadium: Wilson Field

1960 Southern Conference football standings
	Conf.					Overall
Team	W		L		T	W		L		T
VMI $	4	–	1	–	0	7	–	2	–	1
The Citadel	4	–	2	–	0	8	–	2	–	1
George Washington	4	–	2	–	0	5	–	3	–	1
Virginia Tech	4	–	2	–	0	6	–	4	–	0
Furman	2	–	2	–	0	5	–	4	–	1
Richmond	3	–	4	–	1	3	–	6	–	1
Davidson	1	–	3	–	0	3	–	5	–	0
William & Mary	1	–	5	–	0	2	–	8	–	0
West Virginia	0	–	2	–	1	0	–	8	–	2
$ – Conference champion

The 1960 VMI Keydets football team was an American football team that represented the Virginia Military Institute (VMI) as a member of the Southern Conference (SoCon) during the 1960 college football season. Led by eighth-year head coach John McKenna, the Keydets compiled an overall record of 7–2–1 with a mark of 4–1 in conference play, winning the SoCon title.

== Schedule ==
Date	Opponent	Site	Result	Attendance	Source
September 17	at William & Mary	Cary Field; Williamsburg, VA (rivalry)	W 33–21	7,500	
September 23	at Buffalo*	War Memorial Stadium; Buffalo, NY	W 28–14	18,675	
October 1	Richmond	Wilson Field; Lexington, VA	W 21–6	6,500	
October 7	at George Washington	Griffith Stadium; Washington, DC	W 34–10	8,000	
October 15	at Virginia*	Scott Stadium; Charlottesville, VA	W 30–16	21,000	
October 22	at Boston College*	Alumni Stadium; Chestnut Hill, MA	T 14–14	14,000	
October 29	at Memphis State*	Crump Stadium; Memphis, TN	L 8–21	10,933	
November 5	Lehigh*	Wilson Field; Lexington, VA	W 18–14	6,000	
November 12	at The Citadel	Johnson Hagood Stadium; Charleston, SC (rivalry)	W 20–6	14,000	
November 24	vs. Virginia Tech	Victory Stadium; Roanoke, VA (rivalry)	L 12–13	28,000	
*Non-conference game
