= 1985 Marshall Thundering Herd football team =

American college football season

1985 Marshall Thundering Herd football
- Conference: Southern Conference
- Record: 7–3–1 (3–3–1 SoCon)
- Head coach: Stan Parrish (2nd season)
- Captain: Game captains
- Home stadium: Fairfield Stadium

1985 Southern Conference football standings
	Conf.					Overall
Team	W		L		T	W		L		T
No. T–2 Furman $^	6	–	0	–	0	12	–	2	–	0
No. T–12 Appalachian State	6	–	1	–	0	8	–	3	–	0
Chattanooga	5	–	2	–	0	6	–	5	–	0
Marshall	3	–	3	–	1	7	–	3	–	1
The Citadel	2	–	4	–	1	5	–	5	–	1
Western Carolina	2	–	4	–	1	4	–	6	–	1
VMI	1	–	4	–	1	3	–	7	–	1
East Tennessee State	0	–	7	–	0	0	–	10	–	1
Davidson	0	–	2	–	0	1	–	10	–	0
$ – Conference champion; ^ – NCAA Division I-AA playoff participant; Rankings from NCAA Division I-AA Football Committee poll

The 1985 Marshall Thundering Herd football team was an American football team that represented Marshall University in the Southern Conference (SoCon) during the 1985 NCAA Division I-AA football season. In its second season under head coach Stan Parrish, the team compiled a 7–3–1 record (3–3–1 against conference opponents) and played its home games at Fairfield Stadium in Huntington, West Virginia.

== Schedule ==
Date	Opponent	Rank	Site	Result	Attendance	Source
August 31	West Virginia Tech*		Fairfield Stadium; Huntington, WV	W 30–0	17,455	
September 7	at Morehead State*		Jayne Stadium; Morehead, KY	W 27–10	9,500	
September 14	Ohio*		Fairfield Stadium; Huntington, WV (rivalry)	W 31–7	17,511	
September 21	at Eastern Kentucky*		Hanger Field; Richmond, KY	W 13–7	14,200	
September 28	The Citadel	No. 3	Fairfield Stadium; Huntington, WV	W 17–14	17,527	
October 5	No. 12 Western Carolina	No. 3	Fairfield Stadium; Huntington, WV	T 10–10	17,357	
October 12	at No. 9 Furman	No. 7	Paladin Stadium; Greenville, SC	L 3–34	11,072	
October 19	VMI^{†}	No. 16	Fairfield Stadium; Huntington, WV	W 21–16	17,815	
November 2	at Chattanooga	No. 11	Chamberlain Field; Chattanooga, TN	L 7–38	8,369	
November 9	East Tennessee State		Fairfield Stadium; Huntington, WV	W 34–21	16,240	
November 16	at Appalachian State	No. 20	Conrad Stadium; Boone, NC (rivalry)	L 0–40	8,355	
*Non-conference game; ^{†}Homecoming; Rankings from NCAA Division I-AA Football Committee Poll released prior to the game
