= 1985 East Tennessee State Buccaneers football team =

American college football season

1985 East Tennessee State Buccaneers football
- Conference: Southern Conference
- Record: 0–10–1 (0–7 SoCon)
- Head coach: Mike Ayers (1st season)
- Home stadium: Memorial Center

1985 Southern Conference football standings
	Conf.					Overall
Team	W		L		T	W		L		T
No. T–2 Furman $^	6	–	0	–	0	12	–	2	–	0
No. T–12 Appalachian State	6	–	1	–	0	8	–	3	–	0
Chattanooga	5	–	2	–	0	6	–	5	–	0
Marshall	3	–	3	–	1	7	–	3	–	1
The Citadel	2	–	4	–	1	5	–	5	–	1
Western Carolina	2	–	4	–	1	4	–	6	–	1
VMI	1	–	4	–	1	3	–	7	–	1
East Tennessee State	0	–	7	–	0	0	–	10	–	1
Davidson	0	–	2	–	0	1	–	10	–	0
$ – Conference champion; ^ – NCAA Division I-AA playoff participant; Rankings from NCAA Division I-AA Football Committee poll

The 1985 East Tennessee State Buccaneers football team was an American football team that represented East Tennessee State University as a member of the Southern Conference (SoCon) during the 1985 NCAA Division I-AA football season. Led by first-year head coach Mike Ayers, the Buccaneers compiled and overall record of 0–10–1, with a mark of 0–7 in conference play, and finished eighth in the SoCon.

== Schedule ==
Date	Opponent	Site	Result	Attendance	Source
September 7	James Madison*	Memorial Center; Johnson City, TN	L 9–14		
September 21	Chattanooga	Memorial Center; Johnson City, TN	L 0–12	8,744	
September 28	at No. 19 Western Carolina	E. J. Whitmire Stadium; Cullowhee, NC	L 3–13		
October 5	Liberty*	Memorial Center; Johnson City, TN	T 23–23	6,375	
October 12	at VMI	Alumni Memorial Field; Lexington, VA	L 18–23	5,900	
October 19	at No. 5 Furman	Paladin Stadium; Greenville, SC	L 31–35		
October 26	The Citadel	Memorial Center; Johnson City, TN	L 21–28	8,154	
November 2	at Kentucky*	Commonwealth Stadium; Lexington, KY	L 13–23	53,429	
November 9	at Marshall	Fairfield Stadium; Huntington, WV	L 21–34	16,240	
November 16	at No. 12 Georgia Southern*	Paulson Stadium; Statesboro, GA	L 7–46	8,142	
November 23	No. 17 Appalachian State	Memorial Center; Johnson City, TN	L 3–20	7,450	
*Non-conference game; Rankings from NCAA Division I-AA Football Committee Poll released prior to the game
