= 1960 George Washington Colonials football team =

American football team

1960 George Washington Colonials football
- Conference: Southern Conference
- Record: 5–3–1 (4–2 SoCon)
- Head coach: Bill Elias (1st season)
- Home stadium: Griffith Stadium

1960 Southern Conference football standings
	Conf.					Overall
Team	W		L		T	W		L		T
VMI $	4	–	1	–	0	7	–	2	–	1
The Citadel	4	–	2	–	0	8	–	2	–	1
George Washington	4	–	2	–	0	5	–	3	–	1
Virginia Tech	4	–	2	–	0	6	–	4	–	0
Furman	2	–	2	–	0	5	–	4	–	1
Richmond	3	–	4	–	1	3	–	6	–	1
Davidson	1	–	3	–	0	3	–	5	–	0
William & Mary	1	–	5	–	0	2	–	8	–	0
West Virginia	0	–	2	–	1	0	–	8	–	2
$ – Conference champion

The 1960 George Washington Colonials football team was an American football team that represented George Washington University as part of the Southern Conference during the 1960 college football season. In its only season under head coach Bill Elias, the team compiled a 5–3–1 record (4–2 in the SoCon).

== Schedule ==
Date	Opponent	Site	Result	Attendance	Source
September 17	at Florida*	Gator Bowl Stadium; Jacksonville, FL	L 7–30	14,000	
September 24	The Citadel	Washington-Lee HS Stadium; Arlington, VA	W 19–14		
October 1	at William & Mary	Cary Field; Williamsburg, VA	L 9–19	4,500	
October 7	VMI	Griffith Stadium; Washington, DC	L 10–34	8,000	
October 15	at Boston University*	Boston University Field; Boston, MA	T 0–0		
October 29	at Air Force*	DU Stadium; Denver, CO	W 20–6	8,792	
November 4	Richmond	Griffith Stadium; Washington, DC	W 16–0	6,000	
November 11	Virginia Tech	Griffith Stadium; Washington, DC	W 21–8	5,000	
November 19	at West Virginia	Mountaineer Field; Morgantown, WV	W 26–0	10,000	
*Non-conference game
