= 1960 William & Mary Indians football team =

American college football season

1960 William & Mary Indians football
- Conference: Southern Conference
- Record: 2–8 (1–5 SoCon)
- Head coach: Milt Drewer (4th season)
- Captains: Jim Porach; Wayne Woolwine
- Home stadium: Cary Field

1960 Southern Conference football standings
	Conf.					Overall
Team	W		L		T	W		L		T
VMI $	4	–	1	–	0	7	–	2	–	1
The Citadel	4	–	2	–	0	8	–	2	–	1
George Washington	4	–	2	–	0	5	–	3	–	1
Virginia Tech	4	–	2	–	0	6	–	4	–	0
Furman	2	–	2	–	0	5	–	4	–	1
Richmond	3	–	4	–	1	3	–	6	–	1
Davidson	1	–	3	–	0	3	–	5	–	0
William & Mary	1	–	5	–	0	2	–	8	–	0
West Virginia	0	–	2	–	1	0	–	8	–	2
$ – Conference champion

The 1960 William & Mary Indians football team was an American football team that represented the College of William & Mary as a member of the Southern Conference (SoCon) during the 1960 college football season. In their fourth season under head coach Milt Drewer, William & Mary compiled a 2–8 record, with a mark of 1–5 in conference play, placing eighth in the SoCon.

== Schedule ==
Date	Opponent	Site	Result	Attendance	Source
September 17	VMI	Cary Field; Williamsburg, VA (rivalry)	L 21–33	7,500	
September 24	vs. Virginia*	Foreman Field; Norfolk, VA (Oyster Bowl)	W 41–21	7,000	
October 1	George Washington	Cary Field; Williamsburg, VA	W 19–9	4,500	
October 8	at Furman	Sirrine Stadium; Greenville, South Carolina	L 23–25	3,000	
October 15	Virginia Tech	Cary Field; Williamsburg, VA	L 0–27	11,000+	
October 22	at Florida State*	Doak Campbell Stadium; Tallahassee, FL	L 0–22	13,400	
October 28	at Tulane*	Tulane Stadium; New Orleans, LA	L 8–40	25,000	
November 5	at The Citadel	Johnson Hagood Stadium; Charleston, SC	L 0–14	9,000	
November 12	at Vanderbilt	Dudley Field; Nashville, TN	L 8–22		
November 24	at Richmond	City Stadium; Richmond, VA (rivalry)	L 0–19		
*Non-conference game
