= 1960 Virginia Tech Gobblers football team =

American college football season

1960 Virginia Tech Gobblers football
- Conference: Southern Conference
- Record: 6–4 (4–2 SoCon)
- Head coach: Frank Moseley (10th season)
- Home stadium: Miles Stadium

1960 Southern Conference football standings
	Conf.					Overall
Team	W		L		T	W		L		T
VMI $	4	–	1	–	0	7	–	2	–	1
The Citadel	4	–	2	–	0	8	–	2	–	1
George Washington	4	–	2	–	0	5	–	3	–	1
Virginia Tech	4	–	2	–	0	6	–	4	–	0
Furman	2	–	2	–	0	5	–	4	–	1
Richmond	3	–	4	–	1	3	–	6	–	1
Davidson	1	–	3	–	0	3	–	5	–	0
William & Mary	1	–	5	–	0	2	–	8	–	0
West Virginia	0	–	2	–	1	0	–	8	–	2
$ – Conference champion

The 1960 Virginia Tech Gobblers football team represented the Virginia Polytechnic Institute or VPI (now known as Virginia Polytechnic Institute and State University or Virginia Tech) as a member of the Southern Conference (SoCon) during the 1960 college football season. Led by 10th-year head coach Frank Moseley the Gobblers compiled an overall record of 6–4 with a mark of 4–2 in conference play, and finished tied for second in the SoCon. VPI played home games at Miles Stadium in Blacksburg, Virginia.

== Schedule ==
Date	Time	Opponent	Site	Result	Attendance	Source
September 17	1:30 p.m.	at NC State*	Riddick Stadium; Raleigh, NC	L 14–29		
September 24	2:15 p.m.	vs. West Virginia	City Stadium; Richmond, VA (Tobacco Bowl, rivalry)	W 15–0	19,000	
October 1	2:00 p.m.	at No. 7 Clemson*	Memorial Stadium; Clemson, SC	L 7–13	26,000	
October 8	2:45 p.m.	Wake Forest*^{†}	Miles Stadium; Blacksburg, VA	W 22–13	11,000	
October 15	2:45 p.m.	at William & Mary	Cary Field; Williamsburg, VA	W 27–0	11,000+	
October 22	2:15 p.m.	vs. Virginia*	Victory Stadium; Roanoke, VA (Harvest Bowl, rivalry)	W 40–6	20,000	
October 29	2:45 p.m.	at Richmond	City Stadium; Richmond, VA	W 20–0	6,500	
November 5	1:15 p.m.	Davidson	Miles Stadium; Blacksburg, VA	L 7–9		
November 11	7:50 p.m.	at George Washington	Griffith Stadium; Washington, DC	L 8–21	5,000	
November 24	12:50 p.m.	vs. VMI	Victory Stadium; Roanoke, VA (rivalry)	W 13–12	28,000	
*Non-conference game; ^{†}Homecoming; Rankings from AP Poll released prior to the game; All times are in Eastern time

== Roster ==
The following players were members of the 1960 football team according to the roster published in the 1961 edition of The Bugle, the Virginia Tech yearbook.

VPI 1960 roster
Quarterbacks: Frank H. Eastman; Charles Warren Price, Jr.; Elmer Reed; Harold Ward; Guards: Ray Barile; Andy Beckstoffer; James Venable Hickam; Robert Gerald Holbrook; William Duncan Holsclaw, Jr.; Don Jensen; Jim Paine; Mike Zeno; Tackles: John Farmer; Ronald Wayne Frank; Bob Harris; William Roderick McGinnis; Joe Moss; Don Oakes; Bernie Vishneski; Arthur Allen Whittier	Centers: Charles F. Hines; John W. Minichan; Rick Tolley; Gary Welliver; Ends: Jim Farr; Richard B. Goode; Walter Milton Harris; Len Nunnally; Bill Robertson; Charlie Speck; Amos Leon Tomblin; Halfbacks: Herb Bowling; Robert M. Crabtree; Ron Hawkins; Ray Massie; Noah Redding "Buddy" Perry; Art Pruett; Aster Sizemore; Terry L. Strock; Johnny Watkins	Fullbacks: Gerald Bobbitte; Warren Maccaroni; Donald Ray Vaught
