= 1960 Davidson Wildcats football team =

American college football season

1960 Davidson Wildcats football
- Conference: Southern Conference
- Record: 3–5 (1–3 SoCon)
- Head coach: Bill Dole (9th season)
- Home stadium: Richardson Stadium

1960 Southern Conference football standings
	Conf.					Overall
Team	W		L		T	W		L		T
VMI $	4	–	1	–	0	7	–	2	–	1
The Citadel	4	–	2	–	0	8	–	2	–	1
George Washington	4	–	2	–	0	5	–	3	–	1
Virginia Tech	4	–	2	–	0	6	–	4	–	0
Furman	2	–	2	–	0	5	–	4	–	1
Richmond	3	–	4	–	1	3	–	6	–	1
Davidson	1	–	3	–	0	3	–	5	–	0
William & Mary	1	–	5	–	0	2	–	8	–	0
West Virginia	0	–	2	–	1	0	–	8	–	2
$ – Conference champion

The 1960 Davidson Wildcats football team represented Davidson College as a member of the Southern Conference (SoCon) during the 1960 college football season. Led by ninth-year head coach Bill Dole, the Wildcats compiled an overall record of 3–5 with a mark of 1–3 in conference play, placing seventh in the SoCon.

== Schedule ==
Date	Opponent	Site	Result	Attendance	Source
September 17	vs. Catawba*	American Legion Memorial Stadium; Charlotte, NC	W 16–7	2,917	
September 24	at Wofford*	Snyder Field; Spartanburg, SC	L 0–6	4,500	
October 1	The Citadel	Richardson Stadium; Davidson, NC	L 15–21	6,000	
October 8	at Presbyterian*	Bailey Stadium; Clinton, SC	L 0–6	3,200	
October 22	Richmond	Richardson Stadium; Davidson, NC	L 6–35		
November 5	at Virginia Tech	Miles Stadium; Blacksburg, VA	W 9–7		
November 12	at Lehigh*	Taylor Stadium; Bethlehem, PA	W 21–18	5,000	
November 19	Furman	Richardson Stadium; Davidson, NC	L 21–22	7,000	
*Non-conference game
