= John Small (American football) =

American football player (1946–2012)

No. 66, 84
- Positions: Linebacker, Defensive tackle

Personal information
- Born: November 20, 1946; Lumberton, North Carolina, U.S.
- Died: December 10, 2012 (aged 66); Augusta, Georgia, U.S.
- Listed height: 6 ft 4 in (1.93 m)
- Listed weight: 269 lb (122 kg)

Career information
- High school: Richmond Academy (Augusta, Georgia)
- College: The Citadel (1966-1969)
- NFL draft: 1970: 1st round, 12th overall pick

Career history
- Atlanta Falcons (1970–1972); Detroit Lions (1973–1974)

Awards and highlights
- First-team All-American (1969); The Citadel Bulldogs Jersey No. 66 retired

Career NFL statistics
- Fumble recoveries: 4
- Sacks: 2
- Stats at Pro Football Reference

John Kenneth Small (November 20, 1946 – December 10, 2012) was an American professional football player who was a linebacker and defensive tackle with the Atlanta Falcons and Detroit Lions of the National Football League (NFL).

A native of Lumberton, North Carolina, he played collegiately for The Citadel in Charleston, South Carolina where he was a three-time all Southern Conference selection as well as an Honorable Mention All American pick as a sophomore and junior. In his senior season in 1969 he was a Second-team Associated Press All American and a First-team pick by Sporting News, Time Magazine, and the Newspaper Enterprise Association. He was the First Round pick and 12th overall selection by the Atlanta Falcons in the 1970 NFL draft; he played for three years with the Falcons and two more with the Detroit Lions, retiring after the 1974 season.

Small was a recipient of the Order of the Palmetto, the highest award given by the state of South Carolina; in 1977 he was a member of the inaugural class of the Citadel Athletic Hall of Fame. In 1988 he was inducted into the South Carolina Athletic Hall of Fame and that same year was named to the Southern Conference 75th Anniversary team.

After football, Small was a speaker at schools and hospitals in the Augusta area. He helped create a Christian ministry program to help troubled youth called JKS Team Incorporated (where he led as CEO).
