= 1960 Tangerine Bowl (December) =

American college football game

| Tennessee Tech Golden Eagles | The Citadel Bulldogs |
| (8–2) | (7–2–1) |
| Ohio Valley Conference | Southern Conference |
| 0 | 27 |
| Head coach: Wilburn Tucker | Head coach: Eddie Teague |
| | 1 | 2 | 3 | 4 | Total |
|---|---|---|---|---|---|
| Tennessee Tech | 0 | 0 | 0 | 0 | 0 |
| The Citadel | 7 | 0 | 13 | 7 | 27 |
- Date: December 30, 1960
- Season: 1960
- Stadium: Tangerine Bowl
- Location: Orlando, Florida
- MVP: Jerry Nettles, The Citadel
- Attendance: 13,000

The 1960 Tangerine Bowl (December) was an American college football bowl game played on December 30, 1960 at the Tangerine Bowl stadium in Orlando, Florida. The Citadel Bulldogs of the Southern Conference defeated the Tennessee Tech Golden Eagles of the Ohio Valley Conference by a score of 27–0. It was the second of two Tangerine Bowls played in the calendar year 1960.

Heading into the game, The Citadel finished their regular season slate with a 7–2–1 record, finishing second in the Southern Conference behind VMI. This has been The Citadel's only bowl appearance.

Tennessee Tech entered with an 8–2 record. They were Ohio Valley Conference champions after having finished 6–0 in conference play. They have appeared in only one bowl game since the 1972 Grantland Rice Bowl, which they also lost.

Neither team was ranked before or after the game.

== Scoring summary ==
Scoring summary

| Quarter | Time | Drive | | | Team | Scoring information | Score | |
| Quarter | Time | Plays | Yards | TOP | Team | Scoring information | TTU | Citadel |
|---|---|---|---|---|---|---|---|---|
| 1 | 3:08 | 19 | 71 | | Citadel | Bill Allen 6-yard touchdown reception from Jerry Nettles, Bill Gilgo kick good | 0 | 7 |
| 3 | 13:56 | 2 | | | Citadel | Tommy Edwards 56-yard touchdown run, Bill Gilgo kick blocked | 0 | 13 |
| 3 | 7:20 | 7 | 71 | | Citadel | Bill Gilgo 16-yard touchdown reception from Jerry Nettles, Bill Gilgo kick good | 0 | 20 |
| 4 | 7:33 | 9 | 23 | | Citadel | Sid Mitchell 1-yard touchdown run, Bill Gilgo kick good | 0 | 27 |
| "TOP" = time of possession. For other American football terms, see Glossary of American football. | | | | | | | 0 | 27 |
