= Ralph Foster (American football coach) =

American football player and coach (1884–1956)

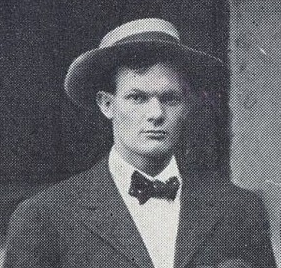
- Foster pictured in the 1907 Citadel football team photo

Biographical details
- Born: May 11, 1884; Lancaster, South Carolina, U.S.
- Died: February 2, 1956 (aged 71); Columbia, South Carolina, U.S.
- Education: South Carolina (1905)

Playing career
- 1902–1904: South Carolina
- Position: End

Coaching career (HC unless noted)
- 1906–1908: The Citadel

Head coaching record
- Overall: 9–5–2

Ralph Kelsey Foster (May 11, 1884 – February 2, 1956) was an American football player and coach. He was the second head football coach at The Citadel, serving for three seasons, from 1906 until 1908, and compiling a record of 8–6–2.

Foster died in 1956.

== Head coaching record ==
Year	Team	Overall	Conference	Standing	Bowl/playoffs
The Citadel Bulldogs (Independent) (1906–1908)
1906	The Citadel	3–0			
1907	The Citadel	2–4–1			
1908	The Citadel	4–1–1			
The Citadel:		9–5–2			
Total:		9–5–2			
