= The Citadel Bulldogs football =

American football team in South Carolina

2026 The Citadel Bulldogs football team
- First season: 1905; 121 years ago
- Athletic director: Art Chase
- Head coach: Maurice Drayton; 4th season, 12–35 (.255)
- Location: Charleston, South Carolina
- Stadium: Johnson Hagood Stadium (capacity: 11,427)
- Field: Sansom Field
- NCAA division: Division I FCS
- Conference: Southern
- Colors: Infantry blue and white
- All-time record: 535–626–32 (.462)
- Bowl record: 1–0 (1.000)

Conference championships
- SoCon: 1961, 1992, 2015, 2016
- Rivalries: Furman (rivalry); VMI (rivalry); Wofford (rivalry)
- Fight song: "The Fighting Light Brigade"
- Mascot: Bulldog
- Marching band: The Regimental Band and Pipes
- Website: citadelsports.com

The Citadel Bulldogs football program represents The Citadel in the NCAA Division I Football Championship Subdivision (FCS). The Bulldogs play in the Southern Conference, as they have since 1936. The Bulldogs are coached by Maurice Drayton, who was hired on January 12, 2023, to replace Brent Thompson, whose contract was not renewed.

== Facilities ==
The Bulldogs first recorded stadium was College Park, located in the northeast corner of Hampton Park in Charleston, South Carolina. This field predated the current College Park at the same site, which is used as a practice facility for The Citadel Bulldogs baseball. Due to increasing attendance and the poor state of the stadium, the Bulldogs moved to the original Johnson Hagood Stadium in 1927. In 1948, that stadium was replaced by the current Johnson Hagood Stadium, which lies just to the south of The Citadel's gates in Charleston.

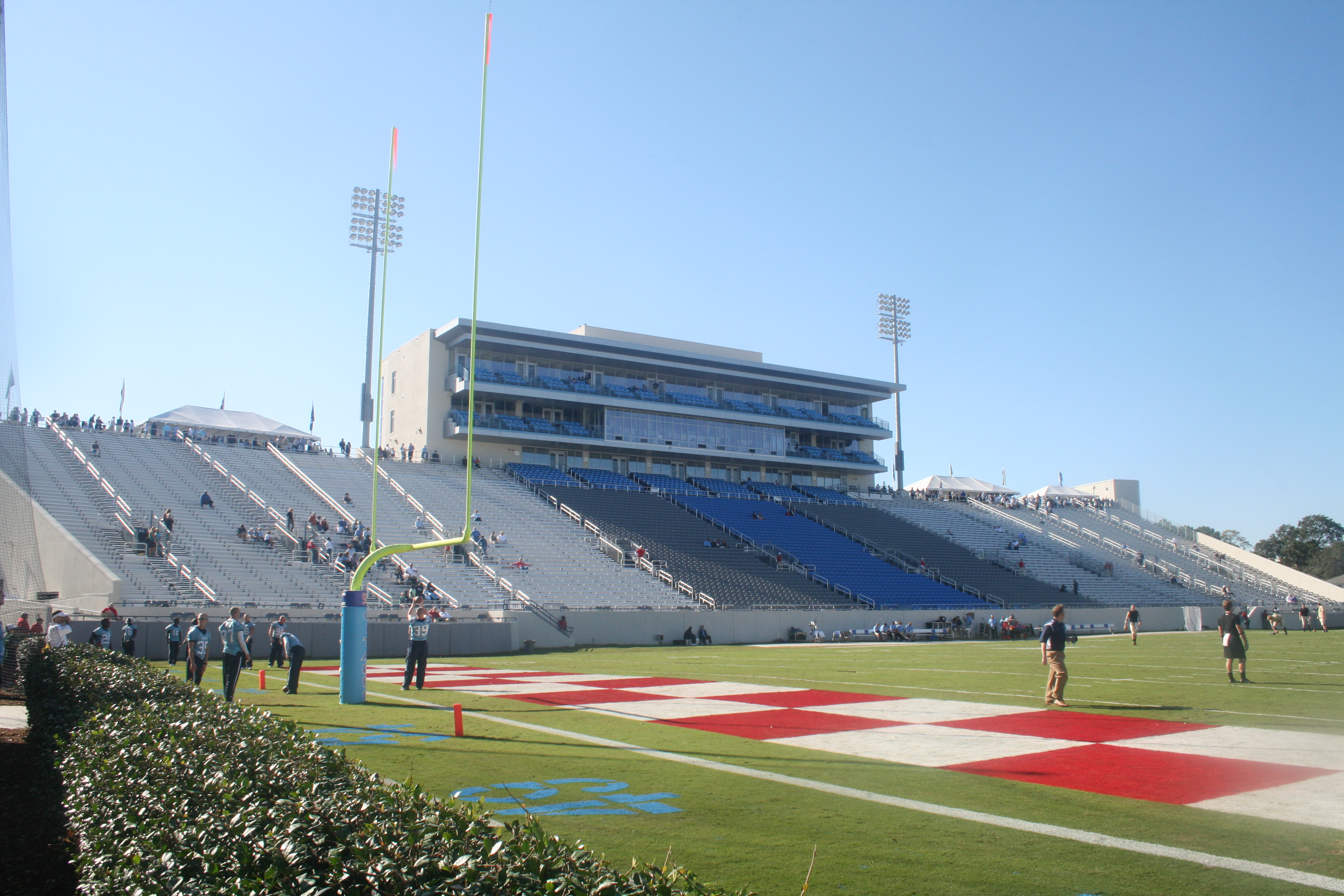
Johnson Hagood Stadium

Johnson Hagood is a 21,000-seat stadium, in which The Citadel routinely ranks in the top 25 in attendance at the FCS level. In 2001, the Altman Athletic Center opened in the south end zone, complete with new home and visitor's locker rooms, official's locker rooms, and an upstairs hospitality area for donors. In 2008, The Citadel completed a re-construction of the west stands and West Side Tower. The stands contain reserved premium seats and bleacher seats, while the tower, shared with the South Carolina National Guard, contains twelve suites, a club level, and state of the art press box. During preparation for construction, workers discovered the remains of sailors from failed test runs of the H.L. Hunley. These remains were reinterred in Magnolia Cemetery in Charleston.

Beginning in 2012, The Citadel implemented a points system for parking and seat selection in Johnson Hagood Stadium, joining many large programs who use similar systems. The program is designed to reward long-time and large donors to The Citadel athletics by giving them preference in selecting seat and parking locations.

In 2016, The Citadel determined that lead paint needed remediation on the east (visitor's) side of the stadium. The work resulted in the entire east side being closed for the first game of the 2016 season and some sections being opened for subsequent games. The capacity was thus 10,500 for the first game and about 15,000 for later games. The Board of Visitors decided to fully renovate the east side of the stadium, announcing that decision on December 2, 2016.

=== Practice and on-campus facilities ===
Practices are held at the Maybank Triplets Practice Facility, an artificial turf field at the north edge of campus. The Bulldogs utilize Seignious Hall, located across from McAlister Field House for weightlifting, locker rooms, team meeting and video space, and academic tutoring. The Citadel Sports Medicine Department also utilizes Seignious Hall.

== Coaches and staff ==
Coaches from The Citadel have often been targeted for larger programs. Former head and assistant coaches at The Citadel include Bobby Ross, Charlie Taaffe, Ellis Johnson, Frank Beamer, Al Davis, Ralph Friedgen, and Mike Houston.

=== Head coaches ===
Name	First Year	Final Year	No. Seasons
Syd Smith	1905	1905	1
Ralph Foster	1906	1908	3
Sam Costen	1909	1910	2
Louis LeTellier	1911	1912	2
George Rogers	1913	1919	4
Harvey O'Brien	1916	1921	5
Carl Prause	1922	1929	8
Johnny Floyd	1930	1931	2
Tatum Gressette	1932	1939	8
Bo Rowland	1940	1942	3
J. Quinn Decker	1946	1952	7
John D. McMillan	1953	1954	2
John Sauer	1955	1956	2
Eddie Teague	1957	1965	9
Red Parker	1966	1972	7
Bobby Ross	1973	1977	5
Art Baker	1978	1982	5
Tom Moore	1983	1986	4
Charlie Taaffe	1987	1995	9
Don Powers	1996	2000	5
Ellis Johnson	2001	2003	3
John Zernhelt	2004	2004	1
Kevin Higgins	2005	2013	9
Mike Houston	2014	2015	2
Brent Thompson	2016	2022	6
Maurice Drayton	2023	recent	4

== Conference championships ==
The Citadel has won four conference championships, three outright and one shared.

Season	Conference	Coach	Overall record	Conference record
1961	Southern Conference	Eddie Teague	7–3	5–1
1992	Southern Conference	Charlie Taaffe	11–2	6–1
2015†	Southern Conference	Mike Houston	9–4	6–1
2016	Southern Conference	Brent Thompson	10–2	8–0

† denotes co–champions

== Postseason appearances ==
=== Bowl games ===
Season	Coach	Bowl	Opponent	Result
1960	Eddie Teague	Tangerine Bowl	Tennessee Tech	W 27–0

=== NCAA Division I-AA/FCS Playoffs results ===
The Citadel has appeared in the NCAA Division I Football Championship playoffs five times, posting a 2–5 record.

Year	Round	Opponent	Result
1988	First Round	Georgia Southern	L 20–38
1990	First Round	Georgia Southern	L 0–31
1992	First Round; Quarterfinals	North Carolina A&T; Youngstown State	W 44–0; L 17–42
2015	First Round; Second Round	Coastal Carolina; Charleston Southern	W 41–38; L 6–14
2016	Second Round	Wofford	L 3–17

== Rivalries ==
The Citadel's primary rivals are the VMI Keydets football and Furman Paladins football. The game with VMI is known as the Military Classic of the South. The Citadel and Furman have been heated, annual rivals since both joined the Southern Conference in 1936. The Citadel is 151-174-9 all-time against in-state opponents.

Opponent	Wins	Losses	Ties	First meeting	Last Citadel win	Last Opponent win
VMI	47	33	2	1920	2026	2023
Furman	37	65	3	1913	2020–21	2026

Record vs. Current SoCon opponents

Tennessee Tech joined the SoCon in 2026

Opponent	Wins	Losses	Ties	First meeting	Last Citadel win	Last Opponent win
Chattanooga	21	37	2	1926	2025	2026
East Tennessee State (Note: East Tennessee State did not sponsor football from 2004–2014)	13	22	0	1966	2022	2026
Mercer (Note: Mercer did not sponsor football from 1941–2012)	11	12	1	1906	2019	2026
Samford	9	10	0	1989	2025	2023
Tennessee Tech	1	1	0	1960	2026	
Western Carolina	27	23	1	1972	2022	2026
Wofford	45	34	1	1916	2024	2026

Record vs instate opponents

Division I, non-SoCon only

Opponent	Wins	Losses	Ties	First meeting	Last Citadel win	Last Opponent win
Charleston Southern (Note: In 2018, Charleston Southern vacated three wins against The Citadel, including one from the 2015 playoffs, after NCAA sanctions. This table reflects on-field results, and does not remove the vacated games.)	8	7	—	2002	2024	2026
Clemson	5	34	1	1909	1931	2024
Coastal Carolina	1	2	—	2014	2015 (Note: The Bulldogs won a 2015 matchup in the first round of the NCAA Division I FCS Playoffs.)	2021
Presbyterian	51	11	1	1915	2017	1979
South Carolina	8	40	3	1905	2015	2011
South Carolina State	5	2	0	1989	2026	2024

== Bulldogs in professional football ==
Many Citadel alumni have played in various professional leagues, including the National Football League, Canadian Football League and Arena Football League. Sixteen players have been drafted in the NFL draft and AFL draft, and other players have signed as undrafted free agents. Likely the most famous Citadel alumni in professional football are Running Back Stump Mitchell and broadcaster Paul Maguire. Andre Roberts is a recent player who achieved success in the NFL and Cortez Allen recently played with the Pittsburgh Steelers for 5 seasons; Running Back Travis Jervey played in 2 Super Bowls with the Green Bay Packers and was named to the Pro Bowl as a special teams player.

NFL draft

Year	Name	Round	Overall	Team
1939	Andy Sabados	13	111	Chicago Cardinals
1959	Pete Davidson	14	165	Los Angeles Rams
1960	Harry Rakowski	15	169	Los Angeles Rams
1960	Joe Davis	17	194	Chicago Cardinals
1969	Jim McMillan	16	415	Baltimore Colts
1970	John Small	1	12	Atlanta Falcons
1977	Brian Ruff	11	304	Baltimore Colts
1981	Stump Mitchell	9	226	St. Louis Cardinals
1987	Greg Davis	9	246	Tampa Bay Buccaneers
1995	Travis Jervey	5	170	Green Bay Packers
2005	Nehemiah Broughton	7	222	Washington Redskins
2010	Andre Roberts	3	88	Arizona Cardinals
2011	Cortez Allen	4	128	Pittsburgh Steelers

AFL draft

Year	Name	Round	Overall	Team
1960	Wayne Stewart			Los Angeles Chargers
1960	Joe Davis			Los Angeles Chargers
1960	Paul Maguire			Los Angeles Chargers
1960	Pete Davidson			Los Angeles Chargers
1960	Harry Rakowski			Buffalo Bills
1964	Vince Petno	8	63	Oakland Raiders

== Individual honors ==
All-Americans
This list includes selected First Team All-Americans at The Citadel

Year	Name	AFCA	AP	Walter Camp	Sports Network/STATS	Football Gazette
1976	Brian Ruff		✓			
1985	Jim Gabrish		✓			
1986	Scott Thompson		✓			
1988	Carlos Avalos		✓	✓	✓	✓
1990	J. J. Davis			✓		
1991	Lester Smith			✓	✓	
1992	Lester Smith		✓	✓	✓	
1992	Carey Cash		✓	✓	✓	
1992	Terrence Forney			✓		
1992	Lance Hansen		✓	✓		
1994	Levi Davis	✓				
1995	Brad Keeney	✓				
1997	Carlos Frank				✓	
2008	Andre Roberts	✓			✓	
2012	Mike Sellers	✓	✓		✓	
2015	Tyler Renew				✓	
2015	Dee Delaney				✓	
2016	Dee Delaney		✓	✓	✓	
2016	Isaiah Pinson	✓		✓	✓	
2016	Tyler Renew				✓	

=== Honored jerseys ===
The Citadel has retired six jersey numbers. The most recent jersey retired was for Marc Buoniconti in 2006.

The Citadel Bulldogs honored jerseys
No.	Player	Pos.	Tenure
14	Jack Douglas	QB	1989–1992
15	Lester Smith	S	1988–1992
35	Stump Mitchell	RB	1977–1980
51	Brian Ruff	LB	1973–1976
59	Marc Buoniconti	LB	1985
66	John Small	LB	1967–1970

== Future non-conference opponents ==
Announced schedules as of December 18, 2025.

2027	2028	2029	2030	2031	2032	2033
at Navy	Gardner–Webb	at Army				at Army
at Virginia Tech	at Clemson					
