= Eddie Teague =

American football coach and administrator (1921–1987)

Biographical details
- Born: December 14, 1921
- Died: November 15, 1987 (aged 65); Charleston, South Carolina, U.S.

Playing career
- 1942: NC State
- 1943: North Carolina
- Position: Halfback

Coaching career (HC unless noted)
- 1947–1948: Guilford (backfield)
- 1949–1950: Guilford
- 1952–1955: Maryland (backfield)
- 1956: North Carolina (assistant)
- 1957–1965: The Citadel

Administrative career (AD unless noted)
- 1949–1951: Guilford
- 1957–1985: The Citadel

Head coaching record
- Overall: 53–53–3
- Bowls: 1–0

Accomplishments and honors

Championships
- 1 SoCon (1961)

Awards
- SoCon Coach of the Year (1961)

Edward Lindell Teague Jr. (December 14, 1921 – November 24, 1987) was an American football coach and college athletics administrator. He served as the head football coach at Guilford College in Greensboro, North Carolina, from 1949 to 1950 and The Citadel in Charleston, South Carolina, from 1957 to 1965, compiling a career college football coaching record of 53–53–3. He also coached The Citadel Bulldogs men's soccer team from 1972 to 1976. Teague was also the athletic director at Guilford from 1949 to 1951 and The Citadel from 1957 to 1985.

== Playing career and military service ==
A native of Washington, D.C., Teague began his college football at North Carolina State University, letter in 1942. He moved the University of North Carolina at Chapel Hill in 1943, as a serviceman in the V-12 Navy College Training Program. There he played for the North Carolina Tar Heels under head coach Tom Young, garnering All-Southern Conference honors.

Teague served in the United States Marine Corps during World War II, reaching the rank of captain. He returned to active service during the Korean War.

== Coaching career ==
Teague began his coaching career at Guilford College in Greensboro, North Carolina, in 1947 as an assistant football coach under Williams Newton. He served as the defensive backfield coach for Maryland from 1952 to 1955. He was the 14th head football coach at The Citadel in Charleston, South Carolina, serving for nine seasons, from 1957 to 1965, and compiling a record of 45–44–2.

In 1964, Teague published a book on football strategy "The Unbalanced Line Open End T Offense."

== Death ==
Teague died on November 24, 1987, in Charleston, South Carolina.

== Head coaching record ==
| Year | Team | Overall | Conference | Standing | Bowl/playoffs |
|---|---|---|---|---|---|
Guilford Quakers (North State Conference) (1949–1950)
| 1949 | Guilford | 4–4–1 | | | |
| 1950 | Guilford | 4–5 | | | |
| Guilford: | | 8–9–1 | | | |
The Citadel Bulldogs (Southern Conference) (1957–1965)
| 1957 | The Citadel | 5–4–1 | 4–2 | 3rd | |
| 1958 | The Citadel | 4–6 | 2–3 | 7th | |
| 1959 | The Citadel | 8–2 | 5–1 | 2nd | |
| 1960 | The Citadel | 8–2–1 | 4–2 | 2nd | W Tangerine |
| 1961 | The Citadel | 7–3 | 5–1 | 1st | |
| 1962 | The Citadel | 3–7 | 1–4 | 7th | |
| 1963 | The Citadel | 4–6 | 2–4 | 7th | |
| 1964 | The Citadel | 4–6 | 4–3 | 4th | |
| 1965 | The Citadel | 2–8 | 2–6 | 8th | |
| The Citadel: | | 45–44–2 | 29–26 | | |
| Total: | | 53–53–3 | | | |
National championship Conference title Conference division title or championship game berth
