= Maurice Drayton =

American football player and coach (born 1976)

The Citadel Bulldogs
- Title: Head coach

Personal information
- Born: October 5, 1976 (age 50); Charleston, South Carolina, U.S.

Career information
- High school: Berkeley (Moncks Corner, South Carolina)
- College: The Citadel
- NFL draft: 1999: undrafted

Career history

Coaching
- The Citadel (1999) Graduate assistant & secondary coach; The Citadel (2000) Tight ends coach & offensive tackles coach; The Citadel (2001) Wide receivers coach; The Citdael (2002) Outside linebackers coach; The Citadel (2003–2005) Secondary coach, special teams coordinator, & recruiting coordinator; Charleston Swamp Foxes (2000–2002) Assistant coach; Seinajoki Crocodiles (2006) Defensive coordinator; Goose Creek HS (SC) (2007) Assistant coach; South Carolina State (2008–2009) Special teams coordinator & defensive backs coach; Coastal Carolina (2010–2011) Assistant head coach, special teams coordinator, & wide receivers coach; Southern Miss (2012) Secondary coach; Montreal Alouettes (2013) Guest coach; The Citadel (2014–2015) Assistant head coach, defensive coordinator, & cornerbacks coach; Indianapolis Colts (2016–2017) Special teams coordinator; Green Bay Packers (2018–2020) Assistant special teams coach; Green Bay Packers (2021) Special teams coordinator; Las Vegas Raiders (2022) Assistant special teams coach; The Citadel (2023–present) Head coach

Operations
- Goose Creek High School (2007) Administrator

Maurice T. Drayton (born October 5, 1976) is an American football coach and former player who is currently the head coach of The Citadel Bulldogs. He has previously coached the Charleston Swamp Foxes, Seinajoki Crocodiles, Goose Creek High School, South Carolina State Bulldogs, Coastal Carolina Chanticleers, Southern Miss Golden Eagles, Montreal Alouettes, Indianapolis Colts, Green Bay Packers, and Las Vegas Raiders.

== Early life and education ==
Maurice Drayton was born on October 5, 1976, in Xenia, Ohio. He initially attended McKinley High School in Canton, Ohio, before later graduating from Berkeley High School in Moncks Corner, S.C. in 1994. He later accepted a scholarship offer from The Citadel. In five seasons with the school, Drayton compiled 145 tackles, 17 passes defensed and three interceptions. He earned varsity letters in his final three years with the team.

== Coaching career ==
=== The Citadel ===
After going unselected in the 1999 NFL draft, Drayton started a coaching career with his alma mater, The Citadel. He served as a graduate assistant and secondary coach during 1999, before becoming tight ends and offensive tackles coach in 2000. He shifted to wide receivers coach in 2001, outside linebackers in 2002, and secondary/special teams coach/recruiting coordinator from 2003 to 2005.

=== Charleston Swamp Foxes ===
While serving as a position coach at The Citadel, Drayton also coached the wide receivers for the Charleston Swamp Foxes of AF2 from 2000 to 2002.

=== Seinajoki Crocodiles and Goose Creek High School ===
In 2006, Drayton served as a defensive coordinator in the European Football League (EFL) with the Seinajoki Crocodiles in Finland. He returned to the United States in 2007 as an assistant coach and administrator for Goose Creek High School.

=== South Carolina State ===
From 2008 to 2009, Drayton coached the special teams and defensive backs at South Carolina State University. While he was there, they won two conference championships and twice made the NCAA playoffs. In 2009, the team was ranked number 7 in the nation for pass defense in number 5 in total defense. They won an HBCU national championship in 2009.

=== Coastal Carolina ===
Drayton left South Carolina State in 2010 to join the Coastal Carolina Chanticleers. He was with the team from 2010 to 2011, serving as special teams, wide receivers, and assistant head coach. He helped them achieve their first conference title since 2006 and had two receivers earn all-conference honors.

=== Southern Miss ===
He served as secondary coach of the Southern Miss Golden Eagles in 2012. Defensive back Kalan Reed, who went on to play several seasons in the National Football League (NFL), recorded 21 tackles and an interception return touchdown as a true freshman under Drayton.

=== Montreal Alouettes ===
Drayton was a guest coach of defense and special teams in 2013 with the Montreal Alouettes of the Canadian Football League (CFL).

=== The Citadel (second stint) ===
Drayton returned to his alma mater of The Citadel in 2014, serving as assistant head coach, defensive coordinator, and cornerbacks coach in two seasons. He helped The Citadel earn several records in 2015, with the team winning six conference games and nine total. Their defense that year was second in scoring defense, total defense, rushing defense, and sacks. They also led their conference with 31 takeaways, just ten total touchdown passes allowed, a 36.5 third-down conversion percentage and 11 fumble recoveries. The secondary also recorded five interceptions returned for touchdowns, most in the FCS. Defensive lineman Mitchell Jeter was named conference defensive player of the year and two players earned All-America honors.

=== Indianapolis Colts ===
Drayton returned to professional ranks in 2016, serving as the special teams coordinator of the Indianapolis Colts in the National Football League (NFL). He helped Pat McAfee earn Pro Bowl honors in 2016 and punter Rigoberto Sanchez earn a position on the all-rookie team the following year. Placekicker Adam Vinatieri recorded two 100-point seasons, extending his record to twenty seasons achieving that mark.

During the 2016 season, the Indianapolis Colts ranked eighth overall amongst NFL special teams units, per metrics from Stampede Blue, as well as fifth overall according to Pro Football Focus. In 2017, the Indianapolis Colts' special teams unit ranked ninth overall per Rick Gosselin's annual special teams rankings.

=== Green Bay Packers ===
Drayton left the Colts in 2018 to join the Green Bay Packers. He was their assistant special teams coach from 2018 to 2020, before being promoted to special teams coordinator in 2021. The Packers’ special teams was consistently one of the worst units throughout the 2021 season as they were ranked 32nd in the NFL by the Football Outsiders DVOA, Packer Central, and Sports Illustrated writer Rick Gosselin.

Drayton was fired from his position on February 1, 2022.

=== Las Vegas Raiders ===
On March 2, 2022, it was announced that Drayton was hired by the Las Vegas Raiders as assistant special teams coach.

Following the 2022-23 season, the Las Vegas Raiders finished in a tie for fourth overall in Rick Gosselin's NFL Special Teams rankings alongside the Chicago Bears and Seattle Seahawks.

While with the Raiders, Drayton coached kicker Daniel Carlson to a 91.9 percent field goal success rate (40-of-43), good for a tie for second within the league for field goals made, en route to AP second-team All-Pro honors. Additionally, punter AJ Cole III secured AP first-team All-Pro honors as well after leading the NFL in net yards per punt average.

=== The Citadel (third stint) ===
Drayton accepted the head coaching role at The Citadel in December 2022.

== Head coaching record ==
| Year | Team | Overall | Conference | Standing | Bowl/playoffs |
|---|---|---|---|---|---|
The Citadel Bulldogs (Southern Conference) (2023–present)
| 2023 | The Citadel | 0–11 | 0–8 | 9th | |
| 2024 | The Citadel | 5–7 | 3–5 | T–6th | |
| 2025 | The Citadel | 4–8 | 3–5 | 7th | |
| 2026 | The Citadel | 3–9 | 1–7 | 9th | |
| The Citadel: | | 12–35 | 7–25 | | |
| Total: | | 12–35 | | | |
