= John Sauer =

American football player, coach, and broadcaster (1925–1996)

- Sauer on the 1953 Rams coaching staff

Biographical details
- Born: August 31, 1925; Dayton, Ohio, U.S.
- Died: March 4, 1996 (aged 70); Oakwood, Ohio, U.S.

Playing career
- 1944–1945: Army
- Position: Quarterback

Coaching career (HC unless noted)
- 1947–1949: Army (backfield)
- 1950–1951: Florida (backfield)
- 1953–1954: Los Angeles Rams (backfield)
- 1955–1956: The Citadel

Administrative career (AD unless noted)
- 1955–1956: The Citadel

Head coaching record
- Overall: 8–9–1

John Edward Sauer (August 31, 1925 – March 4, 1996) was an American football player, coach, and broadcaster.

A Dayton, Ohio native, Sauer was a multi-sport athlete at Oakwood High School. His father, Eddie Sauer, played for the Dayton Triangles in the early days of the NFL.

From 1943 to 1946, Sauer attended the United States Military Academy at West Point, where he played and coached for Army in a number of sports. Leaving the service in 1950, Sauer went into football coaching, first as an assistant with the Florida Gators football team of the University of Florida and the Los Angeles Rams, and then as head coach of the Citadel Bulldogs football team of The Citadel.

In 1957, Sauer quit full-time coaching to work in his father's real estate business, but he continued to work through the rest of the 1950s and into the 1960s as a scout for the Rams and Minnesota Vikings and an assistant offensive and defensive coordinator for the College All-Stars. In 1966-67 Sauer took over as head coach for the All-Stars, losing to Vince Lombardi's Green Bay Packers in both All-Star Games he coached.

In 1963, Sauer began working for CBS television as a color commentator on NFL and college football broadcasts. He continued with CBS until 1974. He then worked from 1974 until 1994 as a color commentator on University of Pittsburgh radio broadcasts.

He died at his home in Oakwood in 1996.

== Head coaching record ==
Year	Team	Overall	Conference	Standing	Bowl/playoffs
The Citadel Bulldogs (Southern Conference) (1955–1956)
1955	The Citadel	5–4	2–2	T–6th	
1956	The Citadel	3–5–1	1–3	8th	
The Citadel:		8–9–1	3–5		
Total:		8–9–1			
