= Tom Moore (American football coach, born 1945) =

American football player and coach (1945–2026)

Biographical details
- Born: February 14, 1945
- Died: May 20, 2026 (aged 81); Charleston, South Carolina, U.S.

Playing career
- 1964–1966: The Citadel
- Position: End

Coaching career (HC unless noted)
- 1967: Aurora HS (CO) (assistant)
- 1968–1970: Wichita State (assistant)
- 1971–1978: Clemson (assistant)
- 1979–1982: Gardner–Webb
- 1983–1986: The Citadel

Head coaching record
- Overall: 35–49–1

Thomas "T. K." Moore (February 14, 1945 – May 20, 2026) was an American college football coach. He served as the head football coach at Gardner–Webb University from 1979 to 1982 and The Citadel from 1983 to 1986, compiling a career college football coaching record of 35–49–1. Moore died in Charleston, South Carolina, on May 20, 2026, at the age of 81.

== Head coaching record ==
| Year | Team | Overall | Conference | Standing | Bowl/playoffs |
|---|---|---|---|---|---|
Gardner–Webb Runnin' Bulldogs (South Atlantic Conference) (1979–1982)
| 1979 | Gardner–Webb | 2–9 | 0–7 | 8th | |
| 1980 | Gardner–Webb | 3–7 | 2–5 | 7th | |
| 1981 | Gardner–Webb | 5–5 | 3–4 | 4th | |
| 1982 | Gardner–Webb | 7–3 | 5–2 | T–2nd | |
| Gardner–Webb: | | 17–24 | 10–16 | | |
The Citadel Bulldogs (Southern Conference) (1983–1986)
| 1983 | The Citadel | 3–8 | 1–6 | T–7th | |
| 1984 | The Citadel | 7–4 | 4–2 | 3rd | |
| 1985 | The Citadel | 5–5–1 | 2–4–1 | T–5th | |
| 1986 | The Citadel | 3–8 | 0–6 | T–8th | |
| The Citadel: | | 18–25–1 | 7–18–1 | | |
| Total: | | 35–49–1 | | | |
