= Ellis Johnson (American football coach) =

American football player and coach (born 1951)

Biographical details
- Born: December 23, 1951 (age 74); Winnsboro, South Carolina, U.S.

Playing career
- 1971–1974: The Citadel
- Position: Defensive end

Coaching career (HC unless noted)
- 1975: The Citadel (DE)
- 1976–1978: Gaffney HS (SC) (DC)
- 1979: Spartanburg HS (SC) (DC)
- 1980–1981: Spartanburg HS (SC)
- 1982: The Citadel (LB)
- 1983: Gardner–Webb
- 1984: Appalachian State (DC)
- 1985–1987: East Carolina (OLB/RC)
- 1988–1989: Southern Miss (DC)
- 1990–1993: Alabama (OLB)
- 1994–1996: Clemson (OLB/DC)
- 1997: Alabama (DC/DL)
- 1998–2000: Alabama (DC/OLB)
- 2001–2003: The Citadel
- 2004–2005: Mississippi State (DC/S)
- 2006–2007: Mississippi State (DC/ILB)
- 2008–2011: South Carolina (AHC/DC/LB)
- 2012: Southern Miss
- 2013–2014: Auburn (DC)
- 2016–2018: South Carolina (analyst)

Head coaching record
- Overall: 17–40 (college)

Laurens Ellis Johnson (born December 23, 1951) is a former American college football coach. He served as head football coach at Gardner–Webb University in 1983, at The Citadel from 2001 to 2003, and at the University of Southern Mississippi in 2012.

== Assistant coaching career ==
Johnson began his coaching career following his graduation from The Citadel in 1975, as the defensive ends coach at his alma mater under Bobby Ross in 1975. In 1976, Johnson accepted an assistant coaching position at Gaffney High School. He served as an assistant at Gaffney through the 1978 season before taking the defensive coordinator position at Spartanburg High School in 1979. After one season as defensive coordinator at Spartanburg, Johnson was promoted to head coach in 1980 and held the position through the 1981 season. As head coach he led the Vikings to a pair of playoff appearances and an overall record of 16 wins and eight losses (16–8). Johnson resigned his position to take the linebackers coach position at The Citadel.

After his one season at Gardner–Webb, Johnson served as an assistant at Appalachian State, East Carolina and Southern Miss before being hired at Alabama by Gene Stallings for the 1990 season. At Alabama, Johnson served as linebackers coach and was on the staff that won the 1992 national championship. He resigned from Alabama after the 1993 season to become the defensive coordinator at Clemson. After three years at Clemson, Johnson returned to Alabama in January 1997 to serve as defensive coordinator for head coach Mike DuBose. He served at Alabama through the 2000 season when he was hired as head coach at The Citadel.

After his three-year tenure with The Citadel, Johnson served as defensive coordinator at both Mississippi State (2004–2007) and South Carolina (2008–2011). While serving at South Carolina the Gamecocks won the SEC East Division championship for the first time in school history in 2010, clinching the title with a convincing 36–14 victory over the Florida Gators. It was a season of firsts for South Carolina, including their first win at Florida, first win over a No. 1 ranked team (Alabama), and first time sweeping the November "Orange Crush" portion of their schedule with wins over Tennessee, Florida and Clemson. Following a 9–3 regular season and an appearance in the SEC championship game. The Gamecocks had another strong season in 2011, beating every opponent in the division. With a 34–13 rout of Clemson, the Gamecocks won 10 games for only the second time in their 119-year football history.

During his stint at South Carolina he signed Jadeveon Clowney; not only a five-star recruit, but also the No. 1 overall prospect of the 2011 class, throughout his senior year. In a live broadcast on ESPN on his eighteenth birthday—February 14, 2011—Clowney announced his commitment to South Carolina, selecting the Gamecocks over Clemson, Alabama, Louisiana State, and Florida State. He was the third-straight South Carolina "Mr. Football" to sign with the Gamecocks, following in the footsteps of his South Pointe teammate Gilmore, also recruited by Johnson.

He has coached in two national championship games, five SEC Championship games, has been part of one national title, three SEC Championships and has placed numerous players on NFL rosters.

While defensive coordinator at South Carolina, Johnson also served as linebackers coach. In his final season with the Gamecocks, his defense ranked third nationally, allowing just 268 yards per game. Under Johnson, South Carolina finished in the Top 15 nationally in total defense three times.

In December 2011, Johnson took the head coaching position at Southern Miss. After one season, Johnson was fired from that position. After his dismissal from Southern Miss, on December 5, 2012, Johnson was hired as the defensive coordinator at Auburn. Iron Bowl 2013. Johnson is credited for calling one of the most memorable plays in college football history. The Kick Six: Auburn's defensive coordinator, Ellis Johnson, doubted Alabama would make the long kick and suggested that defensive back Ryan Smith stand in the end zone with the potential to return a missed field goal. Just before the kick, Malzahn called a timeout to "ice the kicker." During the timeout, Malzahn agreed with Johnson's idea to attempt a return of any missed field goal. However, he suggested Auburn's speedy punt returner, senior Chris Davis Jr., stand under the goalpost rather than Smith. With one second remaining in regulation, Alabama freshman Adam Griffith's 57-yard field goal attempt fell short. Auburn's Chris Davis was positioned at the back of the end zone and caught the errant kick, returning it 109 yards (100 yards under NCAA scoring rules) to the opposite end zone and giving Auburn the upset victory.

In late November 2014, reports began to surface on the internet claiming that Johnson's employment with Auburn University had been terminated. Johnson's firing was made official later in the day.

Johnson returned to South Carolina in 2016, hired by head coach Will Muschamp to serve as an analyst until leaving that position in 2018.

== Head coaching career ==
=== Gardner–Webb ===
After serving one season at The Citadel, on January 6, 1983, Johnson was named head coach at Gardner–Webb University. During his only season at Gardner–Webb in 1983, he led the Runnin' Bulldogs squad to a five wins and six losses (5–6). He resigned his position on January 10, 1984, to become the defensive coordinator for Mack Brown at Appalachian State.

=== The Citadel ===
After serving three seasons as defensive coordinator at Alabama, on December 21, 2000, Johnson was named head coach at The Citadel, The Military College of South Carolina. During his three seasons at The Citadel from 2001 to 2003, he led the Bulldogs to 12 wins and 22 losses (12–22). He resigned his position on December 15, 2003, to become the defensive coordinator for Sylvester Croom at Mississippi State.

=== Southern Miss ===
Johnson was hired on December 20, 2011, as the Golden Eagles head coach. At his introductory news conference he noted USM's 18 straight winning seasons and said: "I am convinced you can always be successful." He signed a four-year contract on August 20, 2012 (twelve days before the start of the 2012 season) that paid him a minimum of $740,000 annually, and was to run through December 23, 2015. In the event that Southern Miss decided to terminate the contract, Johnson would be paid $700,000 for each year left on his contract.

Prior to Johnson's tenure, the Southern Miss football team had recorded eighteen straight winning seasons and been to ten consecutive postseason bowl appearances. In 2011, under Coach Larry Fedora, the Golden Eagles won a school record 12 games and finished in the Top 20 of both major polls after a victory in the 2011 Hawaii Bowl. Fedora departed for North Carolina after the 2011 season, yet the Golden Eagles were expected to experience continued success due to the fact that they would return 13 starters from the previous season. But the 2012 season quickly unraveled and ended with an 0–12 record. As a result, Johnson found himself dealing with an increasingly angry Golden Eagle fan base.

== Personal life ==
Johnson has two sons, Eli and Charlie, and a daughter, Sandra Elliott.

== Head coaching record ==
=== College ===
Year	Team	Overall	Conference	Standing	Bowl/playoffs
Gardner–Webb Runnin' Bulldogs (South Atlantic Conference) (1983)
1983	Gardner–Webb	5–6	4–3	T–3rd	
Gardner–Webb:		5–6	4–3		
The Citadel Bulldogs (Southern Conference) (2001–2003)
2001	The Citadel	3–7	2–6	7th	
2002	The Citadel	3–9	1–7	9th	
2003	The Citadel	6–6	4–4	T–4th	
The Citadel:		12–22	7–17		
Southern Miss Golden Eagles (Conference USA) (2012)
2012	Southern Miss	0–12	0–8	6th (East)	
Southern Miss:		0–12	0–8		
Total:		17–40			
