= Harry J. O'Brien =

American sports coach (1884–1955)

Biographical details
- Born: October 31, 1884; New Haven, Connecticut, U.S.
- Died: August 23, 1955 (aged 71); Philadelphia, Pennsylvania, U.S.

Playing career

Football
- c. 1907–1909: Swarthmore
- Position: Quarterback

Coaching career (HC unless noted)

Football
- 1914–1915: Gettysburg
- 1916–1918: The Citadel
- 1920–1921: The Citadel
- 1922–1925: Drexel

Basketball
- 1914–1916: Gettysburg
- 1916–1918: The Citadel
- 1922–1925: Drexel

Baseball
- 1917–1918: The Citadel

Head coaching record
- Overall: 25–51–6 (football); 42–37 (basketball); 3–9 (baseball)

Harry Joseph O'Brien (October 31, 1884 – August 23, 1955), nicknamed "Shorty", was an American college football, college basketball, and college baseball coach. He was the fifth head football coach at The Citadel, serving for five seasons, from 1916 to 1918 and from 1920 to 1921, compiling a record of 14–15–4. O'Brien also coached basketball and baseball for The Citadel for two seasons during World War I. He tallied a record of 6–2 in basketball and 3–9 in baseball. O'Brien died of coronary thrombosis on August 23, 1955, at his home in Philadelphia.

== Head coaching record ==
=== Football ===
Year	Team	Overall	Conference	Standing	Bowl/playoffs
Gettysburg (Independent) (1914–1915)
1914	Gettysburg	1–6–2			
1915	Gettysburg	3–6			
Gettysburg:		4–12–2			
The Citadel Bulldogs (Southern Intercollegiate Athletic Association) (1916–1918)
1916	The Citadel	6–1–1	4–1		
1917	The Citadel	3–3	1–3		
1918	The Citadel	0–2–1	0–1–1		
The Citadel Bulldogs (Southern Intercollegiate Athletic Association) (1920–1921)
1920	The Citadel	2–6	1–5		
1921	The Citadel	3–3–2	2–3–1		
The Citadel:		14–15–4	8–13–2		
Drexel Dragons (Independent) (1922–1925)
1922	Drexel	2–4			
1923	Drexel	2–6			
1924	Drexel	2–7			
1925	Drexel	1–7			
Drexel:		7–24			
Total:		25–51–6			

== See also ==
- List of college football head coaches with non-consecutive tenure
