= Military Classic of the South =

American college football rivalry

- The Citadel Bulldogs VMI Keydets
- Sport: Football
- First meeting: October 16, 1920; VMI, 35–0
- Latest meeting: November 14, 2026; The Citadel, 24–21^{2OT}
- Next meeting: 2027 at Charleston, South Carolina
- Trophy: Silver Shako

Statistics
- Total meetings: 82
- All-time series: The Citadel leads, 47–33–2
- Trophy series: The Citadel leads, 33–13–1
- Largest victory: The Citadel, 50–0 (1992)
- Longest win streak: The Citadel, 12 (2003–2018)
- Current win streak: The Citadel, 3 (2024–present)

Locations of The Citadel and VMI

The Military Classic of the South is an American college football rivalry game played between The Citadel and Virginia Military Institute. The first game between VMI and The Citadel was in 1920. The game has been played nearly continuously since World War II; since then, only five seasons have seen the game not played.

The original "Military Classic of the South" was previously played between Virginia Tech (VPI) and VMI. It was played on Thanksgiving Day every year beginning in 1913 and lasting until 1985. As Virginia Tech continued to expand its student body from cadets (similar to current day Citadel), the game quickly became unmatched and VMI left the series in 1985.

== Current history ==
VMI and The Citadel first played each other in 1920. The trophy that is currently awarded, the Silver Shako, was introduced in 1976.

The game has been played nearly continuously since World War II, with no matchup in 1956, 2004, and 2008–2010. The Citadel had won the past twelve meetings before VMI's victory in 2019. The Citadel leads the series 47–33–2. At one point in 1967, the Keydets led the series 18–8–1. The Military Classic is the thirteenth-oldest still-played rivalry in the Football Championship Subdivision (FCS) of the NCAA. Both teams were members of the Southern Conference (SoCon) from 1936 until 2003, when VMI left for the Big South Conference and were reunited in the SoCon when VMI returned in 2014.

== Game results ==
| The Citadel victories | VMI victories | Tie games |

| No. | Date | Location | Winner | Score |
|---|---|---|---|---|
| 1 | October 16, 1920 | Lynchburg, VA | VMI | 35–0 |
| 2 | October 12, 1929 | Lexington, VA | VMI | 12–7 |
| 3 | October 11, 1930 | Charleston, SC | The Citadel | 7–6 |
| 4 | October 10, 1931 | Lexington, VA | Tie | 13–13 |
| 5 | October 8, 1932 | Charleston, SC | The Citadel | 12–6 |
| 6 | November 13, 1937 | Lexington, VA | VMI | 27–0 |
| 7 | November 16, 1946 | Lexington, VA | VMI | 21–6 |
| 8 | November 15, 1947 | Charleston, SC | The Citadel | 7–6 |
| 9 | November 13, 1948 | Lexington, VA | VMI | 34–6 |
| 10 | November 12, 1949 | Charleston, SC | The Citadel | 19–14 |
| 11 | November 18, 1950 | Lexington, VA | VMI | 13–7 |
| 12 | November 17, 1951 | Charleston, SC | VMI | 27–21 |
| 13 | November 15, 1952 | Lexington, VA | VMI | 20–19 |
| 14 | October 10, 1953 | Charleston, SC | VMI | 14–0 |
| 15 | November 13, 1954 | Lexington, VA | VMI | 42–0 |
| 16 | November 12, 1955 | Charleston, SC | VMI | 14–7 |
| 17 | November 16, 1957 | Lexington, VA | VMI | 33–7 |
| 18 | November 15, 1958 | Charleston, SC | The Citadel | 14–6 |
| 19 | November 14, 1959 | Lexington, VA | VMI | 32–8 |
| 20 | November 12, 1960 | Charleston, SC | VMI | 20–6 |
| 21 | November 4, 1961 | Lexington, VA | The Citadel | 14–8 |
| 22 | November 3, 1962 | Charleston, SC | VMI | 16–7 |
| 23 | November 16, 1963 | Lexington, VA | VMI | 33–8 |
| 24 | November 14, 1964 | Charleston, SC | The Citadel | 17–0 |
| 25 | November 13, 1965 | Lexington, VA | VMI | 21–7 |
| 26 | November 12, 1966 | Charleston, SC | The Citadel | 30–14 |
| 27 | October 14, 1967 | Roanoke, VA | VMI | 22–11 |
| 28 | October 19, 1968 | Charleston, SC | The Citadel | 13–8 |
| 29 | October 18, 1969 | Lexington, VA | The Citadel | 28–2 |
| 30 | October 24, 1970 | Charleston, SC | The Citadel | 56–9 |
| 31 | October 9, 1971 | Lexington, VA | The Citadel | 25–24 |
| 32 | October 7, 1972 | Charleston, SC | The Citadel | 42–3 |
| 33 | October 6, 1973 | Lexington, VA | VMI | 23–6 |
| 34 | October 12, 1974 | Charleston, SC | VMI | 20–9 |
| 35 | October 25, 1975 | Lexington, VA | The Citadel | 6–3 |
| 36 | November 6, 1976 | Charleston, SC | VMI | 30–14 |
| 37 | October 15, 1977 | Lexington, VA | VMI | 19–3 |
| 38 | September 23, 1978 | Charleston, SC | The Citadel | 14–3 |
| 39 | October 20, 1979 | Lexington, VA | The Citadel | 37–6 |
| 40 | October 4, 1980 | Charleston, SC | The Citadel | 28–0 |
| 41 | October 10, 1981 | Norfolk, VA | VMI | 14–0 |
| 42 | October 9, 1982 | Charleston, SC | The Citadel | 21–7 |

| No. | Date | Location | Winner | Score |
|---|---|---|---|---|
| 43 | October 6, 1983 | Lexington, VA | The Citadel | 27–16 |
| 44 | November 3, 1984 | Charleston, SC | The Citadel | 27–24 |
| 45 | October 5, 1985 | Lexington, VA | Tie | 14–14 |
| 46 | October 11, 1986 | Charleston, SC | VMI | 47–30 |
| 47 | October 10, 1987 | Charleston, SC | VMI | 7–3 |
| 48 | November 12, 1988 | Norfolk, VA | The Citadel | 31–20 |
| 49 | November 11, 1989 | Lexington, VA | VMI | 20–10 |
| 50 | November 3, 1990 | Charleston, SC | The Citadel | 23–3 |
| 51 | October 26, 1991 | Norfolk, VA | The Citadel | 17–14 |
| 52 | November 14, 1992 | Charleston, SC | The Citadel | 50–0 |
| 53 | November 13, 1993 | Charleston, SC | The Citadel | 34–33 |
| 54 | November 12, 1994 | Norfolk, VA | The Citadel | 58–14 |
| 55 | November 11, 1995 | Charleston, SC | VMI | 34–7 |
| 56 | November 16, 1996 | Lexington, VA | VMI | 34–27 |
| 57 | November 15, 1997 | Charleston, SC | The Citadel | 28–6 |
| 58 | November 14, 1998 | Lexington, VA | The Citadel | 36–10 |
| 59 | November 13, 1999 | Charleston, SC | The Citadel | 14–7 |
| 60 | November 11, 2000 | Lexington, VA | VMI | 41–21 |
| 61 | November 10, 2001 | Charleston, SC | The Citadel | 49–7 |
| 62 | November 23, 2002 | Charlotte, NC | VMI | 23–21 |
| 63 | November 15, 2003 | Charlotte, NC | The Citadel | 27–23 |
| 64 | November 19, 2005 | Lexington, VA | The Citadel | 22–14 |
| 65 | November 11, 2006 | Charleston, SC | The Citadel | 48–21 |
| 66 | November 17, 2007 | Lexington, VA | The Citadel | 70–28 |
| 67 | October 29, 2011 | Charleston, SC | The Citadel | 41–14 |
| 68 | November 10, 2012 | Lexington, VA | The Citadel | 27–24 |
| 69 | November 16, 2013 | Charleston, SC | The Citadel | 31–10 |
| 70 | November 22, 2014 | Lexington, VA | The Citadel | 45–25 |
| 71 | November 7, 2015 | Charleston, SC | The Citadel | 35–14 |
| 72 | November 12, 2016 | Lexington, VA | The Citadel | 30–20 |
| 73 | October 28, 2017 | Charleston, SC | The Citadel | 21–3 |
| 74 | October 20, 2018 | Lexington, VA | The Citadel | 34–32 |
| 75 | October 5, 2019 | Charleston, SC | VMI | 34–21 |
| 76 | April 17, 2021 | Lexington, VA | VMI | 31–17 |
| 77 | October 2, 2021 | Charleston, SC | The Citadel | 35–24 |
| 78 | November 19, 2022 | Lexington, VA | The Citadel | 26–22 |
| 79 | October 14, 2023 | Charleston, SC | VMI | 17–13 |
| 80 | October 19, 2024 | Lexington, VA | The Citadel | 13–10 |
| 81 | November 1, 2025 | Charleston, SC | The Citadel | 35–24 |
| 82 | November 14, 2026 | Lexington, VA | The Citadel | 24–21 ^{2OT} |
Series: The Citadel leads 47–33–2

== Other varsity sports ==
| Sport | Last matchup | | | | | All-time series | |
| Sport | Date | Location | Winner | Score | Attendance | Leader | Record |
|---|---|---|---|---|---|---|---|
| Baseball | April 15, 2022 | Gray–Minor Stadium • Lexington, Virginia | VMI | 5–2 | 1,814 | The Citadel | 85–39 |
| Baseball | April 16, 2022 | Gray–Minor Stadium • Lexington, Virginia | VMI | 3–2 | 132 | The Citadel | 85–39 |
| Baseball | April 17, 2022 | Gray–Minor Stadium • Lexington, Virginia | The Citadel | 22–5^{(7)} | 154 | The Citadel | 85–39 |
| Basketball | January 15, 2022 | McAlister Field House • Charleston, SC | VMI | 90–85 | 1,256 | The Citadel | 60–58 |
| Basketball | February 12, 2022 | Cameron Hall • Lexington, VA | The Citadel | 83–79 | 3,745 | The Citadel | 60–58 |
| Women's soccer | October 23, 2022 | WLI Field • Charleston, SC | The Citadel | 5–1 | 203 | The Citadel | 10–7 |
| Women's soccer | October 25, 2022 (Note: SoCon tournament) | WLI Field • Charleston, SC | The Citadel | 3–0 | 176 | The Citadel | 10–7 |
| Wrestling | February 20, 2022 | McAlister Field House • Charleston, SC | The Citadel | 32–5 | N/A | VMI | 43–25 |

== See also ==
- List of NCAA college football rivalry games
