= The Citadel–Furman football rivalry =

American college football rivalry

The Citadel–Furman rivalry
- The Citadel Furman
- Sport: Football
- First meeting: November 1, 1913; The Citadel, 75–0
- Latest meeting: November 7, 2026; Furman, 24–14
- Next meeting: 2027

Statistics
- Total meetings: 106
- All-time series: Furman, 66–37–3
- Largest victory: 75–0, The Citadel (1913)
- Longest win streak: 9, Furman (1982–1990)
- Longest unbeaten streak: 13, Furman (1939–1954)
- Current win streak: 6, Furman

Locations of The Citadel and Furman

The Citadel–Furman football rivalry is an American college football rivalry game played by The Citadel Bulldogs football team of The Citadel, The Military College of South Carolina and the Furman Paladins football team of Furman University.

== History ==
The series dates to 1913, and has been played every year that both schools have fielded a football team since 1919, with only an interruption of 1943 through 1945 during World War II. Furman dominated the early years of the rivalry, winning 27 of the first 34 contests, which also included three ties. Since 1955, the series has been remarkably even, with many close, hard-fought games and three of overtime contests since 2005.

The Paladins and Bulldogs have alternated home sites for most of their history, with contests played twice at the Orangeburg County Fairgrounds in Orangeburg, South Carolina. Furman won both games played in Orangeburg.

The rivalry is enhanced by the stark differences between the two schools: one a military college in coastal Charleston and the other a liberal arts college in upstate Greenville. Many pranks were engineered by cadets and students, most memorably in 1963 when Citadel cadets kidnapped the horse that Furman's Paladin mascot rode during games. While the tale was embellished by Pat Conroy, the horse survived but did not resume its mascot duties.

The series was an end of the season fixture on each team's schedule from 1965 through 1992, and returned to the last regular season weekend in 2012. When The Citadel's other primary rival, VMI, departed the Southern Conference, Bulldog coaches worked to restore Furman as their primary rival in the minds of their players and fans.

== Game results ==
The Citadel victories	Furman victories	Tie games

No.	Date	Location	Winner	Score
1	November 1, 1913	Charleston, SC	The Citadel	75–0
2	November 1, 1919	Greenville, SC	Furman	21–6
3	October 9, 1920	Charleston, SC	Furman	21–6
4	October 29, 1921	Greenville, SC	Furman	42–0
5	October 19, 1922	Charleston, SC	Furman	28–0
6	October 20, 1923	Greenville, SC	Furman	30–14
7	October 25, 1924	Charleston, SC	The Citadel	6–0
8	October 10, 1925	Greenville, SC	Furman	7–0
9	November 20, 1926	Charleston, SC	Furman	7–0
10	November 19, 1927	Charleston, SC	Furman	6–0
11	November 10, 1928	Greenville, SC	Furman	13–0
12	November 9, 1929	Charleston, SC	Tie	0–0
13	November 22, 1930	Greenville, SC	Furman	31–6
14	November 14, 1931	Charleston, SC	Furman	33–7
15	October 27, 1932	Orangeburg, SC	Furman	20–0
16	October 14, 1933	Greenville, SC	Furman	14–0
17	November 10, 1934	Charleston, SC	Furman	6–0
18	November 2, 1935	Greenville, SC	Furman	35–0
19	October 10, 1936	Greenville, SC	Furman	13–7
20	October 16, 1937	Charleston, SC	The Citadel	8–0
21	October 15, 1938	Greenville, SC	The Citadel	9–6
22	October 14, 1939	Charleston, SC	Furman	7–0
23	October 11, 1940	Greenville, SC	Furman	36–7
24	October 18, 1941	Charleston, SC	Tie	13–13
25	November 7, 1942	Greenville, SC	Furman	20–0
26	October 19, 1946	Charleston, SC	Furman	14–0
27	October 17, 1947	Greenville, SC	Furman	7–0
28	October 23, 1948	Greenville, SC	Furman	9–0
29	October 21, 1949	Charleston, SC	Furman	19–7
30	October 21, 1950	Greenville, SC	Furman	21–7
31	October 19, 1951	Orangeburg, SC	Furman	35–14
32	October 17, 1952	Greenville, SC	Tie	7–7
33	October 2, 1953	Charleston, SC	Furman	27–0
34	October 16, 1954	Greenville, SC	Furman	31–20
35	October 15, 1955	Charleston, SC	The Citadel	25–19
36	October 27, 1956	Greenville, SC	Furman	7–0
37	October 26, 1957	Charleston, SC	The Citadel	18–14
38	October 25, 1958	Greenville, SC	The Citadel	24–6
39	October 24, 1959	Charleston, SC	The Citadel	18–14
40	October 22, 1960	Greenville, SC	The Citadel	7–6
41	October 21, 1961	Charleston, SC	The Citadel	9–8
42	October 27, 1962	Greenville, SC	Furman	33–25
43	October 26, 1963	Charleston, SC	Furman	34–25
44	October 24, 1964	Greenville, SC	The Citadel	17–0
45	November 20, 1965	Charleston, SC	The Citadel	28–0
46	November 19, 1966	Greenville, SC	The Citadel	10–6
47	November 18, 1967	Charleston, SC	Furman	14–6
48	October 5, 1968	Greenville, SC	The Citadel	31–12
49	November 15, 1969	Charleston, SC	The Citadel	37–21
50	November 14, 1970	Greenville, SC	Furman	28–21
51	November 13, 1971	Charleston, SC	The Citadel	35–33
52	November 11, 1972	Greenville, SC	The Citadel	19–13
53	November 10, 1973	Charleston, SC	The Citadel	26–21
54	November 16, 1974	Greenville, SC	The Citadel	24–0

No.	Date	Location	Winner	Score
55	November 15, 1975	Charleston, SC	The Citadel	13–9
56	September 25, 1976	Greenville, SC	The Citadel	17–16
57	November 19, 1977	Charleston, SC	The Citadel	10–3
58	November 18, 1978	Greenville, SC	Furman	17–13
59	November 17, 1979	Charleston, SC	Furman	45–44
60	November 22, 1980	Greenville, SC	Furman	28–15
61	November 21, 1981	Charleston, SC	The Citadel	35–18
62	November 20, 1982	Greenville, SC	Furman	27–0
63	November 19, 1983	Charleston, SC	Furman	49–21
64	November 17, 1984	Greenville, SC	Furman	42–14
65	November 16, 1985	Charleston, SC	Furman	42–0
66	November 22, 1986	Greenville, SC	Furman	37–14
67	November 21, 1987	Charleston, SC	Furman	58–13
68	November 19, 1988	Greenville, SC	Furman	30–17
69	November 18, 1989	Charleston, SC	Furman	44–9
70	November 17, 1990	Greenville, SC	Furman	30–17
71	November 23, 1991	Charleston, SC	The Citadel	10–6
72	November 21, 1992	Greenville, SC	The Citadel	20–14
73	October 16, 1993	Charleston, SC	The Citadel	20–10
74	October 15, 1994	Greenville, SC	The Citadel	52–44
75	October 14, 1995	Charleston, SC	Furman	24–3
76	October 19, 1996	Greenville, SC	Furman	35–25
77	October 18, 1997	Charleston, SC	Furman	21–7
78	October 17, 1998	Greenville, SC	The Citadel	25–24
79	October 16, 1999	Charleston, SC	Furman	31–17
80	October 14, 2000	Greenville, SC	Furman	33–7
81	October 13, 2001	Charleston, SC	Furman	30–7
82	October 19, 2002	Greenville, SC	Furman	37–10
83	October 18, 2003	Charleston, SC	The Citadel	10–9
84	October 16, 2004	Greenville, SC	Furman	33–14
85	October 15, 2005	Charleston, SC	Furman	39–31^{3OT}
86	October 14, 2006	Greenville, SC	Furman	23–17
87	October 13, 2007	Charleston, SC	The Citadel	54–51^{OT}
88	October 18, 2008	Greenville, SC	Furman	34–20
89	October 24, 2009	Charleston, SC	The Citadel	38–28
90	September 25, 2010	Greenville, SC	Furman	31–14
91	September 10, 2011	Charleston, SC	Furman	16–6
92	November 17, 2012	Greenville, SC	The Citadel	42–20
93	September 28, 2013	Charleston, SC	Furman	24–17
94	November 8, 2014	Charleston, SC	The Citadel	42–35^{OT}
95	October 24, 2015	Greenville, SC	The Citadel	38–17
96	September 10, 2016	Charleston, SC	The Citadel	19–14
97	November 11, 2017	Greenville, SC	Furman	56–20
98	October 27, 2018	Charleston, SC	Furman	28–17
99	October 19, 2019	Greenville, SC	The Citadel	27–10
100	April 10, 2021	Charleston, SC	The Citadel	26–7
101	October 16, 2021	Greenville, SC	Furman	24–14
102	October 8, 2022	Charleston, SC	Furman	21–10
103	October 7, 2023	Greenville, SC	Furman	28–14
104	October 5, 2024	Charleston, SC	Furman	17–16
105	October 25, 2025	Greenville, SC	Furman	24–14
106	November 7, 2026	Charleston, SC	Furman	24–14
Series: Furman leads 66–37–3

== Other varsity sports ==
Sport	Last Matchup					All-Time Series	
Sport	Date	Location	Winner	Score	Attendance	Leader	Record
Basketball (M)	January 21, 2026	McAlister Field House • Charleston, SC	The Citadel	77–75 ^{(OT)}	1,433	Furman	130–88
Basketball (M)	February 25, 2026	Timmons Arena • Greenville, SC	Furman	71–52	2,500	Furman	130–88
Tennis (M)	March 13, 2026	Mickel Tennis Center • Greenville, SC	Furman	6–1	NA	Furman	68–30
Soccer (W)	October 4, 2026	WLI Field • Charleston, SC	Furman	5–0	168	Furman	24–3–1
Volleyball (W)	October 6, 2026	McAlister Field House • Charleston, SC	The Citadel	3–1	212	Furman	46–11
Volleyball (W)	October 27, 2026	Timmons Arena • Greenville, SC	Furman	3–0	274	Furman	46–11

== Discontinued sports ==
Sport	Last Matchup					All-Time Series
Sport	Date	Location	Winner	Score	Leader	Record
Baseball (Note: Furman discontinued its baseball program after the 2020 season, which was canceled prior to the series against The Citadel.)	March 29, 2019	Latham Baseball Stadium • Greenville, SC	Furman	5–4	The Citadel	137–105–2
Baseball	March 30, 2019	Latham Baseball Stadium • Greenville, SC	Furman	20–6	The Citadel	137–105–2
Baseball	March 31, 2019	Latham Baseball Stadium • Greenville, SC	Furman	7–2	The Citadel	137–105–2
Soccer (M) (Note: The Citadel discontinued its men's soccer program after the 2002 season.)	August 30, 2002	WLI Field • Charleston, SC	Furman	3–0	Furman	28–11–2
Wrestling (Note: Furman discontinued its wrestling program after the 1990–91 season.)	December 5, 1990	McAlister Field House • Charleston, SC	The Citadel	25–12	The Citadel	14–0 (Note: The results of 3 dual wrestling meets are undocumented.)

== See also ==
- List of NCAA college football rivalry games
- List of most-played college football series in NCAA Division I
