= Wake Forest Demon Deacons football statistical leaders =

The Wake Forest Demon Deacons football statistical leaders are individual statistical leaders of the Wake Forest Demon Deacons football program in various categories, including passing, rushing, receiving, total offense, defensive stats, and kicking. Within those areas, the lists identify single-game, single-season, and career leaders. The Demon Deacons represent Wake Forest University in the NCAA's Atlantic Coast Conference.

Although Wake Forest began competing in intercollegiate football in 1888, the school's official record book does not generally include entries from before the 1940s, as records from before this year are often incomplete and inconsistent.

These lists are dominated by more recent players for several reasons:

- Since the 1940s, seasons have increased from 10 games to 11 and then 12 games in length.
- The NCAA didn't allow freshmen to play varsity football until 1972 (with the exception of the World War II years), allowing players to have four-year careers.
- Bowl games only began counting toward single-season and career statistics in 2002. The Demon Deacons have played in 11 bowl games since this decision (with one in each season since 2016), giving many recent players an extra game to accumulate statistics.
- Wake Forest played in the 2006 and 2021 ACC Championship Games, giving players in both seasons yet another game to accumulate statistics.
- Due to COVID-19 issues, the NCAA ruled that the 2020 season would not count against any football player's athletic eligibility, giving all who played in that season the opportunity for five years of eligibility instead of the normal four.

These lists are updated through Week 12 of the 2026 season. Active players are listed in bold.

== Passing ==
=== Passing yards ===
Career
Rank	Player	Yards	Years
1	Sam Hartman	12,967	2018 2019 2020 2021 2022
2	Riley Skinner	9,762	2006 2007 2008 2009
3	Tanner Price	8,899	2010 2011 2012 2013
4	John Wolford	8,794	2014 2015 2016 2017
5	Brian Kuklick	8,017	1994 1995 1996 1997 1998
6	Mike Elkins	7,304	1985 1986 1987 1988
7	Gary Schofield	7,205	1981 1982 1983
8	Jay Venuto	5,056	1979 1980
9	Rusty LaRue	5,016	1992 1993 1994 1995
10	Keith West	4,748	1989 1990 1991 1992

Single season
Rank	Player	Yards	Year
1	Sam Hartman	4,228	2021
2	Sam Hartman	3,701	2022
3	John Wolford	3,192	2017
4	Riley Skinner	3,160	2009
5	Tanner Price	3,017	2011
6	Jamie Newman	2,868	2019
7	Rusty LaRue	2,775	1995
8	**Gio Lopez**	2,701	2026
9	Brian Kuklick	2,683	1998
10	Jay Venuto	2,624	1980

Single game
Rank	Player	Yards	Years	Opponent
1	Rusty LaRue	545	1995	NC State
2	Gary Schofield	504	1981	Maryland
3	Rusty LaRue	501	1995	Georgia Tech
4	Rusty LaRue	478	1995	Duke
5	John Wolford	461	2017	Louisville
6	Sam Hartman	458	2021	Army
7	Jay Venuto	447	1980	South Carolina
8	Steele Pizzella	432	2026	Merrimack
9	Mike Elkins	429	1986	NC State
	Sam Hartman	429	2020	North Carolina

=== Passing touchdowns ===
Career
Rank	Player	TDs	Years
1	Sam Hartman	110	2018 2019 2020 2021 2022
2	Riley Skinner	60	2006 2007 2008 2009
3	John Wolford	59	2014 2015 2016 2017
4	Tanner Price	52	2010 2011 2012 2013
5	Gary Schofield	44	1981 1982 1983
	Brian Kuklick	44	1994 1995 1996 1997 1998
7	Mike Elkins	43	1985 1986 1987 1988
8	Jay Venuto	37	1979 1980
9	Jamie Newman	35	2017 2018 2019
10	Keith West	28	1989 1990 1991 1992

Single season
Rank	Player	TDs	Year
1	Sam Hartman	39	2021
2	Sam Hartman	38	2022
3	John Wolford	29	2017
4	Riley Skinner	26	2009
	Jamie Newman	26	2019
6	Jay Venuto	21	1980
	**Gio Lopez**	21	2026
8	Tanner Price	20	2011
9	Gary Schofield	18	1981
10	Mike Elkins	17	1986
	Phil Barnhill	17	1989
	Rusty LaRue	17	1995

Single game
Rank	Player	TDs	Years	Opponent
1	Sam Hartman	6	2022	Clemson
2	Jay Venuto	5	1980	South Carolina
	John Wolford	5	2017	Louisville
	Jamie Newman	5	2019	Elon
	Sam Hartman	5	2021	Army
	Sam Hartman	5	2021	North Carolina
	Sam Hartman	5	2022	Boston College
8	Phil Barnhill	4	1989	Tulsa
	Rusty LaRue	4	1995	Duke
	Riley Skinner	4	2009	Maryland
	Riley Skinner	4	2009	Duke
	John Wolford	4	2017	Texas A&M (Belk Bowl)
	Jamie Newman	4	2018	Duke
	Sam Hartman	4	2020	North Carolina
	Sam Hartman	4	2022	Vanderbilt
	Sam Hartman	4	2022	North Carolina
	Sam Hartman	4	2022	Syracuse
	Deshawn Purdie	4	2025	Oregon State
	Gio Lopez	4	2026	California

== Rushing ==
=== Rushing yards ===
Career
Rank	Player	Yards	Years
1	Chris Barclay	4,032	2002 2003 2004 2005
2	James McDougald	3,811	1976 1977 1978 1979
3	Michael Ramseur	3,325	1982 1983 1984 1985
4	Demond Claiborne	2,599	2022 2023 2024 2025
5	Tarence Williams	2,581	1999 2000 2001 2002
6	Morgan Kane	2,550	1996 1997 1998 1999
7	Matt Colburn II	2,528	2015 2016 2017 2018
8	Cade Carney	2,446	2016 2017 2018 2019
9	Topper Clemons	2,379	1982 1983 1984 1985
10	John Leach	2,246	1990 1991 1992 1993

Single season
Rank	Player	Yards	Year
1	Larry Hopkins	1,228	1971
2	Chris Barclay	1,192	2003
3	James McDougald	1,177	1979
4	Morgan Kane	1,161	1999
5	Chris Barclay	1,127	2005
6	John Leach	1,089	1993
7	Demond Claiborne	1,049	2024
8	Brian Piccolo	1,044	1964
9	James McDougald	1,018	1976
	Tarence Williams	1,018	2001

Single game
Rank	Player	Yards	Years	Opponent
1	John Leach	329	1993	Maryland
2	Micah Andrews	254	2005	Vanderbilt
3	James McDougald	249	1976	Clemson
4	Nub Smith	246	1949	William & Mary
5	Chris Barclay	243	2003	Maryland
	Matt Colburn II	243	2018	Louisville
7	Josh Harris	241	2010	Virginia Tech
8	Matt Colburn II	237	2017	Syracuse
9	Larry Hopkins	230	1970	Clemson
	Larry Hopkins	230	1971	Tulsa

=== Rushing touchdowns ===
Career
Rank	Player	TDs	Years
1	Chris Barclay	40	2002 2003 2004 2005
2	James McDougald	30	1976 1977 1978 1979
	Michael Ramseur	30	1982 1983 1984 1985
4	Larry Russell	29	1969 1970 1971
5	Demond Claiborne	26	2022 2023 2024 2025
6	Tarence Williams	22	1999 2000 2001 2002
	Josh Adams	22	2007 2008 2009 2010
8	Cade Carney	21	2016 2017 2018 2019
9	Brian Piccolo	19	1962 1963 1964
	Anthony Williams	19	1988 1989 1990 1991
	Josh Harris	19	2010 2011 2012 2013
	John Wolford	19	2014 2015 2016 2017

Single season
Rank	Player	TDs	Year
1	Brian Piccolo	15	1964
	Larry Russell	15	1971
3	Kenneth Walker III	13	2020
4	Ovie Mughelli	12	2002
	Chris Barclay	12	2003
6	James McDougald	11	1979
	Josh Adams	11	2007
	Sam Hartman	11	2021
	Demond Claiborne	11	2024

Single game
Rank	Player	TDs	Years	Opponent
1	John Polanski	4	1939	Western Maryland
	John Polanski	4	1939	Davison
	Red Cochran	4	1942	South Carolina
	Fred Grant	4	1943	NC State
	Larry Russell	4	1971	Davison
	Larry Russell	4	1971	William & Mary
	James McDougald	4	1979	Auburn
	Michael Ramseur	4	1982	Maryland
	Michael Ramseur	4	1983	Richmond
	Ovie Mughelli	4	2002	Northern Illinois
	Chris Barclay	4	2005	East Carolina

== Receiving ==
=== Receptions ===
Career
Rank	Player	Rec	Years
1	Michael Campanaro	229	2010 2011 2012 2013
2	Taylor Morin	227	2020 2021 2022 2023 2024
3	Desmond Clark	216	1995 1996 1997 1998
4	Ricky Proehl	188	1986 1987 1988 1989
5	Jammie Deese	184	1996 1997 1998 1999
6	Cam Serigne	174	2014 2015 2016 2017
7	A. T. Perry	171	2019 2020 2021 2022
8	Chris Givens	163	2009 2010 2011
9	Thabiti Davis	161	1994 1995 1996 1997
10	James Brim	153	1983 1984 1985 1986

Single season
Rank	Player	Rec	Year
1	Kenneth Moore	98	2007
2	Greg Dortch	89	2018
3	Chris Givens	83	2011
4	DJ Boldin	81	2008
	A. T. Perry	81	2022
6	Michael Campanaro	79	2012
7	Kendall Hinton	73	2019
8	Desmond Clark	72	1997
9	Jaquarii Roberson	71	2021
	A. T. Perry	71	2021

Single game
Rank	Player	Rec	Years	Opponent
1	Michael Campanaro	16	2012	Boston College
	Michael Campanaro	16	2014	Louisiana-Monroe
3	James Brim	15	1986	NC State
	Marlon Estes	15	1995	NC State
	Kenneth Moore	15	2007	Boston College
	Kenneth Moore	15	2007	Navy
7	John Henry Mills	14	1990	Duke
8	Marlon Estes	13	1995	Duke
	Desmond Clark	13	1996	Duke
	Michael Campanaro	13	2012	North Carolina
	Kendall Hinton	13	2019	Louisville

=== Receiving yards ===
Career
Rank	Player	Yards	Years
1	Taylor Morin	2,974	2020 2021 2022 2023 2024
2	Ricky Proehl	2,949	1986 1987 1988 1989
3	Desmond Clark	2,834	1995 1996 1997 1998
4	A. T. Perry	2,662	2019 2020 2021 2022
5	Michael Campanaro	2,506	2010 2011 2012 2013
6	Chris Givens	2,473	2009 2010 2011
7	Wayne Baumgardner	2,431	1978 1979 1980 1981
8	Jammie Deese	2,348	1996 1997 1998 1999
9	Todd Dixon	2,300	1990 1991 1992 1993
10	Jaquarii Roberson	2,158	2018 2019 2020 2021

Single season
Rank	Player	Yards	Year
1	Chris Givens	1,330	2011
2	A. T. Perry	1,293	2021
3	A. T. Perry	1,096	2022
4	Greg Dortch	1,078	2018
	Jaquarii Roberson	1,078	2021
6	Ricky Proehl	1,053	1989
7	Kenneth Moore	1,011	2007
8	Sage Surratt	1,001	2019
	Kendall Hinton	1,001	2019
10	Wayne Baumgardner	1,000	1979

Single game
Rank	Player	Yards	Years	Opponent
1	Wayne Baumgardner	271	1980	South Carolina
2	John Henry Mills	230	1990	Duke
3	Carlos Hernandez	197	2025	Delaware
4	Sage Surratt	196	2019	Louisville
5	James Brim	194	1986	NC State
	Fabian Davis	194	2000	Navy
	Carlos Hernandez	194	2026	Louisville
8	Chris Givens	191	2011	Maryland
9	Kendall Hinton	189	2019	Duke
10	James Brim	185	1986	Duke
	Ricky Proehl	185	1989	Duke

=== Receiving touchdowns ===
Career
Rank	Player	TDs	Years
1	A. T. Perry	28	2019 2020 2021 2022
2	Ricky Proehl	25	1986 1987 1988 1989
3	Todd Dixon	22	1990 1991 1992 1993
4	Red O'Quinn	21	1946 1947 1948 1949
	Chris Givens	21	2009 2010 2011
	Cam Serigne	21	2014 2015 2016 2017
	Taylor Morin	21	2020 2021 2022 2023 2024
8	Desmond Clark	20	1995 1996 1997 1998
9	Kenny Duckett	19	1978 1979 1980 1981
10	Greg Dortch	17	2017 2018
	Jaquarii Roberson	17	2018 2019 2020 2021

Single season
Rank	Player	TDs	Year
1	A. T. Perry	15	2021
2	Kenny Duckett	12	1980
3	Ricky Proehl	11	1989
	Sage Surratt	11	2019
	A. T. Perry	11	2022
6	Marlon Estes	9	1995
	Chris Givens	9	2011
	Greg Dortch	9	2017
	Cam Serigne	9	2017
	Taylor Morin	9	2022
	Jahmal Banks	9	2022

Single game
Rank	Player	TDs	Years	Opponent
1	Greg Dortch	4	2017	Louisville
	Greg Dortch	4	2018	Rice
3	Herb Cline	3	1941	George Washington
	Red O'Quinn	3	1949	William & Mary
	John Zeglinski	3	1975	South Carolina
	Kenny Duckett	3	1981	Maryland
	Todd Dixon	3	1992	Duke
	Marlon Estes	3	1995	NC State
	Michael Campanaro	3	2012	Boston College
	Cam Serigne	3	2017	Syracuse
	Tabari Hines	3	2017	NC State
	Sage Surratt	3	2019	Louisville
	Jaquarii Roberson	3	2020	Wisconsin (Duke's Mayo Bowl)
	A.T. Perry	3	2021	Syracuse
	Jaquarii Roberson	3	2021	Army
	A.T. Perry	3	2022	Syracuse
	Chris Barnes	3	2025	Oregon State
	Dominick Barry	3	2026	California

== Total offense ==
Total offense is the sum of passing and rushing statistics. It does not include receiving or returns.

=== Total offense yards ===
Career
Rank	Player	Yards	Years
1	Sam Hartman	13,822	2018 2019 2020 2021 2022
2	Riley Skinner	9,923	2006 2007 2008 2009
3	John Wolford	9,914	2014 2015 2016 2017
4	Tanner Price	9,179	2010 2011 2012 2013
5	Brian Kuklick	7,838	1994 1995 1996 1997 1998
6	Mike Elkins	7,170	1985 1986 1987 1988
7	Gary Schofield	6,784	1981 1982 1983
8	Rusty LaRue	5,008	1992 1993 1994 1995
9	James MacPherson	4,947	1999 2000 2001 2002
10	Jay Venuto	4,915	1979 1980

Single season
Rank	Player	Yards	Year
1	Sam Hartman	4,591	2021
2	John Wolford	3,875	2017
3	Sam Hartman	3,830	2022
4	Riley Skinner	3,216	2009
5	**Gio Lopez**	3,070	2026
6	Robby Ashford	3,026	2025
7	Tanner Price	2,964	2011
8	Phil Barnhill	2,820	1989
9	Rusty LaRue	2,801	1995
10	Hank Bachmeier	2,733	2024

Single game
Rank	Player	Yards	Years	Opponent
1	Rusty LaRue	554	1995	NC State
2	Rusty LaRue	514	1995	Georgia Tech
3	John Wolford	499	2017	Syracuse
4	Steele Pizzella	495	2026	Merrimack
5	Sam Hartman	480	2021	Army
6	Sam Hartman	476	2021	North Carolina
7	John Wolford	475	2017	Louisville
8	John Wolford	468	2017	Texas A&M (Belk Bowl)
9	Rusty LaRue	464	1995	Duke
10	Sam Hartman	463	2021	Duke

=== Touchdowns responsible for ===
"Touchdowns responsible for" is the official NCAA term for combined rushing and passing touchdowns. It does not include receiving or returns. Wake Forest does not list single-game leaders in this statistic.

Career
Rank	Player	TDs	Years
1	Sam Hartman	127	2018 2019 2020 2021 2022
2	John Wolford	78	2014 2015 2016 2017
3	Riley Skinner	65	2006 2007 2008 2009
	Tanner Price	65	2010 2011 2012 2013
5	Brian Kuklick	50	1994 1995 1996 1997 1998
6	Gary Schofield	47	1981 1982 1983
7	Mike Elkins	46	1985 1986 1987 1988

Single season
Rank	Player	TDs	Year
1	Sam Hartman	50	2021
2	John Wolford	39	2017
	Sam Hartman	39	2022
4	Jamie Newman	32	2019
5	**Gio Lopez**	31	2026
6	Riley Skinner	28	2009
7	Jay Venuto	22	1980
8	Tanner Price	21	2011
	Robby Ashford	21	2025
10	Phil Barnhill	20	1989

== Defense ==
=== Interceptions ===
Career
Rank	Player	Ints	Years
1	Alphonso Smith	21	2005 2006 2007 2008
2	Ronnie Burgess	17	1981 1982 1983 1984
	A. J. Greene	17	1985 1986 1987 1988
4	James Royster	13	1975 1976 1977 1978
5	George Coghill	12	1989 1990 1991 1992
	Josh Gattis	12	2003 2004 2005 2006
7	Billy Ray Barnes	11	1954 1955 1956
	Joe Carazo	11	1963 1964 1965
9	Terry Kuharchek	10	1968 1969 1970

Single season
Rank	Player	Ints	Year
1	Alphonso Smith	8	2007
2	A. J. Greene	7	1987
	Alphonso Smith	7	2008
4	Joe Carazo	6	1965
	Andy Harper	6	1966
	Ronnie Burgess	6	1983
	Josh Bush	6	2011

Single game
Rank	Player	Ints	Years	Opponent
1	Nick Sacrinty	4	1945	Clemson
	A. J. Greene	4	1987	Georgia Tech

=== Tackles ===
Career
Rank	Player	Tackles	Years
1	Ed Stetz	460	1969 1970 1971
2	Carlos Bradley	431	1978 1979 1980
3	Kevin Giles	403	1991 1992 1993 1994
4	Bill Armstrong	402	1973 1974 1975 1976
5	Kelvin Moses	399	1995 1996 1997 1999
6	Ernie Purnsley	385	1985 1986 1987 1988
7	Reggie McCummings	374	1983 1984 1985
8	Nick Andersen	369	2020 2021 2023 2024 2025
9	Ryan Smenda Jr.	355	2018 2019 2020 2021 2022
10	Jimmie Simmons	346	1984 1985 1986 1987

Single season
Rank	Player	Tackles	Year
1	Ed Stetz	203	1971
2	Ed Stetz	191	1970
3	Bill Armstrong	177	1975
4	Scott Roberts	159	1986
5	Carlos Bradley	157	1979
6	Eddie Purnsley	154	1986
7	James Parker	146	1979
8	Marc Hester	144	1979
9	Carlos Bradley	142	1980
	Lamont Scales	142	1989

Single game
Rank	Player	Tackles	Years	Opponent
1	Ed Stetz	29	1971	Clemson
	Ernie Purnsley	29	1987	Army
3	Ed Stetz	25	1970	NC State
	Ed Stetz	25	1970	Houston
5	Bill Armstrong	24	1975	Kansas State
	Brad White	24	2002	Navy
7	Ernie Purnsley	23	1986	NC State
	Scott Roberts	23	1986	Georgia Tech
	Jimmie Simmons	23	1987	Army
	Kevin Giles	23	1992	North Carolina

=== Sacks ===
Career
Rank	Player	Sacks	Years
1	Michael McCrary	30.0	1989 1990 1991 1992
2	Calvin Pace	29.0	1999 2000 2001 2002
3	Jasheen Davis	25.5	2020 2021 2022 2023 2024
4	Duke Ejiofor	23.5	2014 2015 2016 2017
5	Carlos Basham Jr.	20.5	2017 2018 2019 2020
6	Bryan Ray	19.0	1997 1998 1999 2000
7	Nikita Whitlock	18.5	2010 2011 2012 2013
8	Rondell Bothroyd	16.5	2018 2019 2020 2021 2022
9	James Parker	15.0	1976 1977 1978 1979
	Fred Robbins	15.0	1996 1997 1998 1999

Single season
Rank	Player	Sacks	Year
1	Michael McCrary	15.0	1992
2	Carlos Basham Jr.	11.0	2019
3	Duke Ejiofor	10.5	2016
4	Michael McCrary	10.0	1991
	Bryan Ray	10.0	1999
	Calvin Pace	10.0	2001
7	Maurice Miller	9.0	1992
	Calvin Pace	9.0	2000
	Nikita Whitlock	9.0	2013
	Luiji Vilain	9.0	2021

Single game
Rank	Player	Sacks	Years	Opponent
1	Michael McCrary	4.0	1992	Maryland

== Kicking ==
=== Field goals made ===
Career
Rank	Player	FGs	Years
1	Nick Sciba	80	2018 2019 2020 2021
2	Sam Swank	71	2005 2006 2007 2008
3	Mike Weaver	68	2014 2015 2016 2017
4	Matthew Burdick	46	1996 1997 1998 1999
5	Jimmy Newman	42	2009 2010 2011 2012
	Matthew Dennis	42	2022 2023 2024 2025
7	Wilson Hoyle	37	1986 1987 1988 1989

Single season
Rank	Player	FGs	Year
1	Nick Sciba	24	2019
2	Sam Swank	23	2006
	Nick Sciba	23	2021
4	Mike Weaver	21	2016
	Mike Weaver	21	2017
6	Sam Swank	19	2005
	Nick Sciba	19	2018
8	Sam Swank	18	2007
	Connor Calvert	18	2025
10	Matt Wisnosky	17	2002
	Jimmy Newman	17	2011

Single game
Rank	Player	FGs	Years	Opponent
1	Wilson Hoyle	5	1987	North Carolina
	Mike Green	5	1991	Maryland
	Nick Sciba	5	2019	Florida State

=== Field goal percentage ===
Career
Rank	Player	FG%	Years
1	Nick Sciba	89.9%	2018 2019 2020 2021
2	Nick Sciba	81.8%	2025
3	Matthew Dennis	77.8%	2022 2023 2024 2025
4	Mike Weaver	76.4%	2014 2015 2016 2017
5	Sam Swank	76.3%	2005 2006 2007 2008
6	Chad Hedlund	73.3%	2012 2013
7	Jimmy Newman	72.4%	2009 2010 2011 2012
8	Wilson Hoyle	69.8%	1986 1987 1988 1989
9	Tyler Ashe	69.2%	1999 2000 2001
10	Matthew Burdick	68.7%	1996 1997 1998 1999

Single season
Rank	Player	FG%	Year
1	Nick Sciba	96.0%	2019
2	Jimmy Newman	92.3%	2011
