= 1991 Georgia Tech Yellow Jackets football team =

American college football season

1991 Georgia Tech Yellow Jackets football
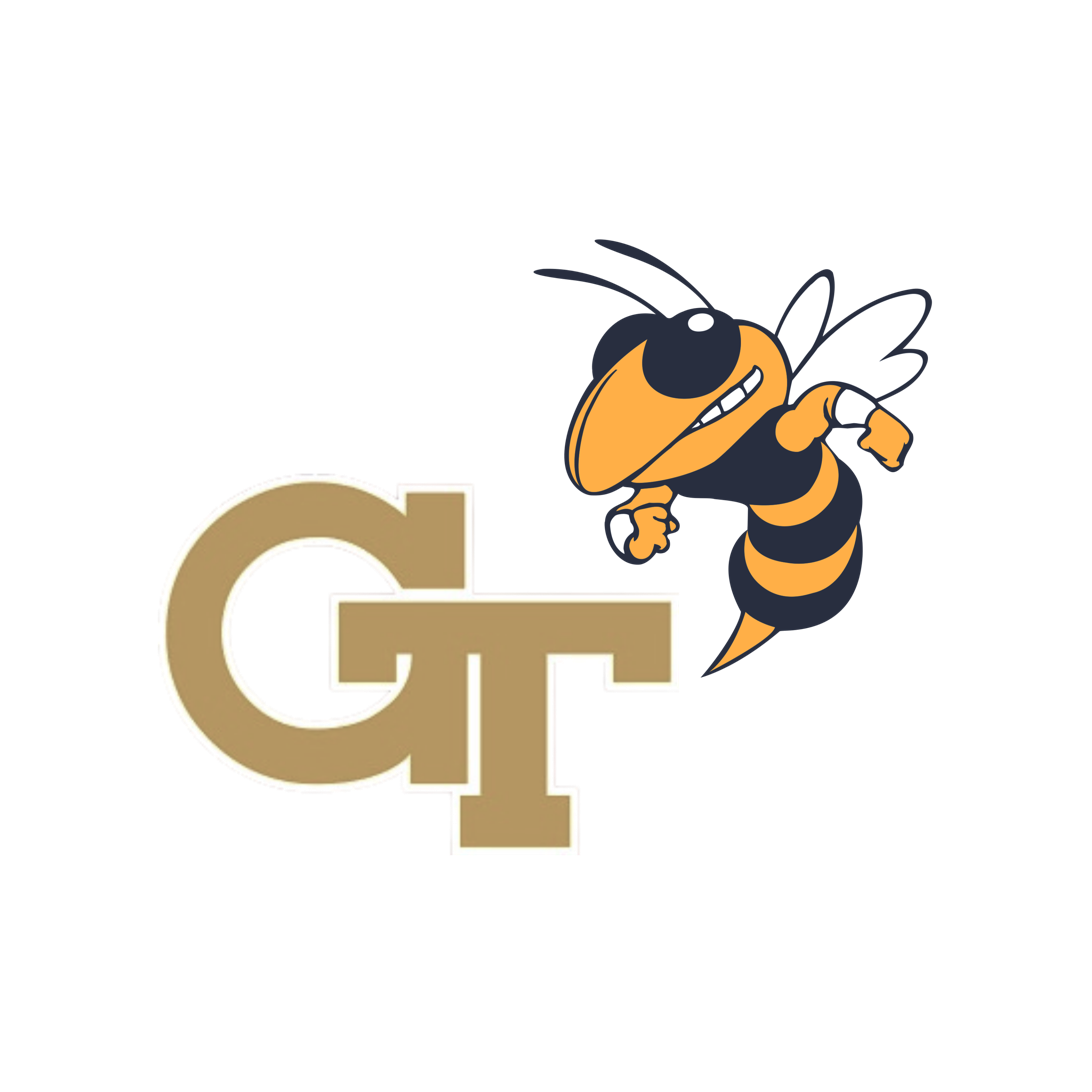

Aloha Bowl champion

Aloha Bowl, W 18–17 vs. Stanford
- Conference: Atlantic Coast Conference
- Record: 8–5 (5–2 ACC)
- Head coach: Bobby Ross (5th season)
- Offensive coordinator: Ralph Friedgen (5th season)
- Defensive coordinator: George O'Leary (5th season)
- Captains: Mike Mooney; Willie Clay; Steve Pharr
- Home stadium: Bobby Dodd Stadium

1991 Atlantic Coast Conference football standings
	Conf.					Overall
Team	W		L		T	W		L		T
No. 18 Clemson $	6	–	0	–	1	9	–	2	–	1
No. 24 NC State	5	–	2	–	0	9	–	3	–	0
Georgia Tech	5	–	2	–	0	8	–	5	–	0
Virginia	4	–	2	–	1	8	–	3	–	1
North Carolina	3	–	4	–	0	7	–	4	–	0
Maryland	2	–	5	–	0	2	–	9	–	0
Duke	1	–	6	–	0	4	–	6	–	1
Wake Forest	1	–	6	–	0	3	–	8	–	0
$ – Conference champion; Rankings from AP Poll

The 1991 Georgia Tech Yellow Jackets football team represented the Georgia Institute of Technology during the 1991 NCAA Division I-A football season. The Yellow Jackets were led by head coach Bobby Ross in his fifth and final year with the team, and played their home games at Bobby Dodd Stadium in Atlanta, Georgia. They competed as members of the Atlantic Coast Conference, finishing tied for second.

The defending national champions of the Coaches Poll, Georgia Tech finished with a disappointing five losses. They opened the year with a top-ten battle with Penn State in the Kickoff Classic, losing 22–34. Further losses to ACC foes Clemson and NC State knocked Georgia Tech out of the polls. They won 5 of their last 6, however, capped by a come-from-behind win over Stanford in the 1991 Aloha Bowl in Honolulu.

== Schedule ==
Date	Opponent	Rank	Site	TV	Result	Attendance	Source
August 28	vs. No. 7 Penn State*	No. 8	Giants Stadium; East Rutherford, NJ (Kickoff Classic)	Raycom	L 22–34	77,409	
September 14	at Boston College*	No. 17	Alumni Stadium; Chestnut Hill, MA		W 30–14	26,108	
September 19	Virginia	No. 17	Bobby Dodd Stadium; Atlanta, GA	ESPN	W 24–21	42,192	
September 28	at No. 7 Clemson	No. 19	Memorial Stadium; Clemson, SC (rivalry)	ABC	L 7–9	83,194	
October 5	at No. 19 NC State	No. 21	Carter–Finley Stadium; Raleigh, NC	Raycom	L 21–28	44,105	
October 12	Maryland		Bobby Dodd Stadium; Atlanta, GA	Raycom	W 34–10	42,011	
October 19	at South Carolina*		Williams–Brice Stadium; Columbia, SC		L 14–23	67,220	
October 26	North Carolina^{†}		Bobby Dodd Stadium; Atlanta, GA	Raycom	W 35–14	45,542	
November 2	at Duke		Wallace Wade Stadium; Durham, NC		W 17–6	38,732	
November 9	Furman*		Bobby Dodd Stadium; Atlanta, GA		W 19–17	40,039	
November 16	Wake Forest		Bobby Dodd Stadium; Atlanta, GA	Raycom	W 27–3	38,124	
November 30	No. 25 Georgia*		Bobby Dodd Stadium; Atlanta, GA (Clean, Old-Fashioned Hate)	Raycom	L 15–18	46,053	
December 25	vs. No. 17 Stanford*		Aloha Stadium; Halawa, HI (Aloha Bowl)	ABC	W 18–17	34,433	
*Non-conference game; ^{†}Homecoming; Rankings from AP Poll released prior to the game

== Roster ==
1991 Georgia Tech Yellow Jackets football team roster
Players
Coaches
Offense

Pos.	#	Name	Class
RB	36	William Bell	Jr
QB	10	Shawn Jones	Jr
OT	70	Mike Mooney	Sr

Defense

Pos.	#	Name	Class
DB	4	Willie Clay	Sr
LB	95	Marco Coleman	Jr
FS	1	Ken Swilling	Sr

Special teams

Pos.	#	Name	Class
K	9	Scott Sisson	Jr

Head coach

- Bobby Ross

Coordinators/assistant coaches

- Ralph Friedgen – Offensive coordinator/quarterbacks
- Danny Smith – Running backs
- Terry Strock – Wide receivers
- Mark Hendrickson – Tight ends/special teams
- Pat Watson – Offensive line
- George O'Leary – Defensive coordinator/defensive line
- Chuck Bresnahan – Inside linebackers
- Brian Baker – Outside linebacker
- Chuck Priefer – Defensive backs

Legend

- (C) Team captain
- (S) Suspended
- (I) Ineligible
- Injured
- Redshirt

== After the season ==
=== NFL draft ===
The following Yellow Jackets were selected in the 1992 NFL draft after the season.

Round	Pick	Player	Position	NFL team
1	12	Marco Coleman	Linebacker	Miami Dolphins
4	108	Mike Mooney	Tackle	Houston Oilers
7	184	Ken Swilling	Cornerback	Tampa Bay Buccaneers
8	221	Willie Clay	Safety	Detroit Lions
11	300	Tom Covington	Tight end	San Francisco 49ers
