= Rick Duckett =

American basketball coach (1957–2024)

Biographical details
- Born: August 3, 1957; Winston-Salem, North Carolina, U.S.
- Died: January 7, 2024 (aged 66); Goose Creek, South Carolina, U.S.
- Education: North Carolina

Coaching career (HC unless noted)
- 1979–1980: North Carolina (graduate assistant)
- 1982–1983: Reynolds HS (assistant)
- 1983–1984: Jacksonville (assistant)
- 1984–1985: UCF (assistant)
- 1985–1986: South Carolina (assistant)
- 1986–1992: Wichita State (assistant)
- 1992–1993: Reynolds HS (assistant)
- 1993–1998: Fayetteville State
- 1998–2001: Winston-Salem State
- 2001–2008: South Carolina (assistant)
- 2008–2009: Grambling State
- 2011–2012: Tennessee State (assistant)
- 2012–2017: Miami (Ohio) (associate head coach)
- 2017–2021: Charleston Southern (associate head coach)

Head coaching record
- Overall: 156–98 (college)

Accomplishments and honors

Championships
- 2× CIAA Tournament champion (1999, 2000)

Awards
- 2× CIAA Coaches Award (1999, 2000); NCAA Division II South Athletic Coach of the Year (1999)

Ricky Lane Duckett (August 3, 1957 – January 7, 2024) was an American college basketball coach. He served as the head coach of the Fayetteville State Broncos, Winston-Salem State Rams and Grambling State Tigers and compiled a 156–98 overall record.

== Coaching career ==
Duckett was born on August 3, 1957, in Winston-Salem, North Carolina, to parents Herbert Duckett and Doris Burrell. He attended Richard J. Reynolds High School in Winston-Salem. Duckett graduated from the University of North Carolina at Chapel Hill in 1979 and began his coaching career as the first African-American graduate assistant for the North Carolina Tar Heels during the 1979–80 season. He was the head coach of the freshman squad of the Harvard Crimson from 1980 to 1982. Duckett returned to his alma mater Reynolds to become an assistant coach for the basketball team for the 1982–1983 season. Duckett served one season stints as an assistant coach for the Jacksonville Dolphins, UCF Knights and South Carolina Gamecocks from 1983 to 1986. He was an assistant coach for the Wichita State Shockers from 1986 to 1992 and then returned to Reynolds High School as an assistant coach from 1992 to 1993.

Duckett received his first head coaching role for the Fayetteville Broncos in 1993 and remained there until 1998. He was the head coach of the Winston-Salem State Rams from 1998 to 2001 and accumulated a 73–19 record. He was named the NCAA Division II South Athletic Coach of the Year in 1999. Duckett won the CIAA Tournament Coaches Award in 1999 and 2000 as he led his teams to a championship both years. His two championship teams were inducted into Winston-Salem State's Big House Gaines Hall of Fame in 2012. Duckett left the Rams in 2001 to return as an assistant coach for the South Carolina Gamecocks, where he served for seven seasons and was known as the team's defensive coordinator.

Duckett was named head coach of the Grambling State Tigers in 2008 and signed a four-year contract. He coached the Tigers to a 6–23 overall record and 4–14 Southwestern Athletic Conference (SWAC) record. Duckett and two of his assistant coaches, Steve Portland and Phillip Stitt, were fired by Grambling State on September 25, 2009, in the wake of the death of Tigers player Henry White, who died on August 26, 2009, as a result of a preseason training exercise; Duckett was not present at the training as he was undergoing surgery. Duckett was not given a reason for his dismissal. He did not serve as a coach for two seasons and instead worked as a basketball color analyst for the UNC Greensboro Spartans on 101.1 WZTK-FM.

Duckett returned to coaching when he was hired as an assistant coach for the Tennessee State Tigers in 2011. He joined the Miami RedHawks as an associate head coach in 2012. Duckett was hired as the assistant head coach of the Charleston Southern Buccaneers on August 29, 2017. He had been a candidate to return as head coach of Winston-Salem State in 2018 but they hired another coach and he stayed with the Buccaneers. Duckett served four seasons with the Buccaneers until he retired in 2021. He then worked as a consultant for the Houston Texans of the National Football League until he medically retired.

== Personal life ==
Duckett's younger brother, Kenny, was a wide receiver for the New Orleans Saints and Dallas Cowboys.

Duckett married his wife, Letita, in 1987 and they had two children. He led Bible studies at his local church.

Duckett died on January 7, 2024, at the age of 66 after a battle with cancer.
