= Tanner Price =

American football player (born 1991)

Profile
- Position: Quarterback

Personal information
- Born: May 17, 1991 (age 35); Racine, Wisconsin, U.S.
- Listed height: 6 ft 2 in (1.88 m)
- Listed weight: 205 lb (93 kg)

Career information
- High school: Westlake (Austin, Texas)
- College: Wake Forest
- NFL draft: 2014: undrafted

Career history
- Cougars de Saint-Ouen-l'Aumône (2015)

Awards and highlights
- Second in career passing yards at Wake Forest

Tanner Price (born May 17, 1991) is an American former football quarterback. He played college football at Wake Forest. He also attended Westlake High School in Texas.

== Early life ==
Price was born on May 17, 1991 in Racine, Wisconsin. He is the son of Steve, a former quarterback at Southwestern Oklahoma State, and Stacy Price.

Price attended Westlake High School in Austin, Texas. He helped Westlake to the state 5A state championship game as a senior. In the championship game, he threw for 250 yards and rushed for 92 yards on 20 carries. During his senior year, he was also named second team All-Centex and was District 25-5A offensive MVP. As a junior, he threw for 2,302 yards and 15 touchdowns and was rated as the No. 35 quarterback prospect in the country by Rivals.com his senior year.

College recruiting
Name	Hometown	School	Height	Weight	40^{‡}	Commit date
Tanner Price; QB	Austin, Texas	Westlake High School	6 ft 2 in (1.88 m)	195 lb (88 kg)	4.70	Jun 23, 2009
Tanner Price; QB	Recruit ratings: Scout: Rivals: (78)					

== College career ==
Price committed to Wake Forest on June 23, 2009. As a freshman, he battled returning junior Skylar Jones (who eventually transferred to Memphis) and sophomore Ted Stachitas. Ted Stachitas started the first 2 games but after that, Price started 9 while Stachitas started 1. He set a Wake Forest freshman passing records in yards, percentage, passes attempted, passes completed, starts and touchdowns. He ended up passing for 1,349 yards and completed 59% of his passes for 7 touchdowns. His sophomore season he made 13 starts while leading his team to a bowl game and passed for 3,019 yards while completing 60% of his passes for 20 touchdowns. His junior season the team started running more with running back Joshua Harris and he was banged up all year and passed for 2,300 yards and threw 12 touchdowns and completed 56% of his passes. His senior year, he was banged up again and passed for 2,078 yards in 11 starts and had 13 touchdowns while completing 55% of his passes. He also had 2014 NFL draft pick Michael Campanaro all 4 years and he was his leading receiver for 3 of them. He finished his career as the number 2 career passer in Wake Forest History passing for 8899 yards in his career.

== Career statistics ==
=== Statistics ===
	Passing							Rushing			
YEAR	CMP	ATT	CMP%	YDS	TD	INT	RAT	ATT	YDS	AVG	TD
2010	137	241	56.8	1,349	7	8	106.8	75	120	1.6	4
2011	253	422	60.0	3,017	20	9	132.8	78	-53	-.7	1
2012	228	410	55.6	2,300	12	7	109.2	77	-26	-.3	2
2013	206	378	54.5	2,078	13	10	110.2	123	239	1.9	5
Totals	824	1,451	58.3	8,899	52	32	116.6	353	280	0.8	12

== Professional career ==
Price attended the Montreal Alouettes training camp but did not make the team and was not drafted in the 2014 NFL draft and has not been selected as a free agent by an NFL team yet. He is currently playing (2015 season) in France for Les Cougars de St-Ouen l'Aumone which he signed to play for on August 5, 2014. Price was named player of the week for the French League in week 2 after throwing for 327 yards and 3 touchdowns.

After an undefeated season with the Cougars he won the 2015 French "Elite" championship, throwing for 1 touchdown and rushing for 1, helping the team to a 28-7 victory.
