= 1998 Maryland Terrapins football team =

American college football season

1998 Maryland Terrapins football
- Conference: Atlantic Coast Conference
- Record: 3–8 (1–7 ACC)
- Head coach: Ron Vanderlinden (2nd season)
- Offensive coordinator: Craig Johnson (2nd season)
- Defensive coordinator: Wally Ake (2nd season)
- Home stadium: Byrd Stadium

1998 Atlantic Coast Conference football standings
	Conf.			Overall
Team	W		L	W		L
No. 3 Florida State $+	7	–	1	11	–	2
No. 9 Georgia Tech +	7	–	1	10	–	2
No. 18 Virginia	6	–	2	9	–	3
North Carolina	5	–	3	7	–	5
NC State	5	–	3	7	–	5
Duke	2	–	6	4	–	7
Wake Forest	2	–	6	3	–	8
Clemson	1	–	7	3	–	8
Maryland	1	–	7	3	–	8
$ – BCS representative as conference champion; + – Conference co-champions; Rankings from AP Poll

The 1998 Maryland Terrapins football team represented the University of Maryland in the 1998 NCAA Division I-A football season. In their second season under head coach Ron Vanderlinden, the Terrapins compiled a 3–8 record, finished in a tie for last place in the Atlantic Coast Conference, and were outscored by their opponents 290 to 202. The team's statistical leaders included Ken Mastrole with 632 passing yards, LaMont Jordan with 906 rushing yards, and Jermaine Arrington with 366 receiving yards.

== Schedule ==
Date	Time	Opponent	Site	TV	Result	Attendance	Source
September 5		James Madison*	Byrd Stadium; College Park, MD		W 23–15	36,547	
September 12	12:00 p.m.	at No. 12 Virginia	Scott Stadium; Charlottesville, VA (rivalry)	JPS	L 19–31	42,800	
September 19	6:00 p.m.	at No. 19 West Virginia*	Mountaineer Field; Morgantown, WV (rivalry)	ESPN2	L 20–42	52,279	
September 26		Temple*	Byrd Stadium; College Park, MD		W 30–20	27,047	
October 3	1:00 p.m.	No. 9 Florida State	Byrd Stadium; College Park, MD	PPV	L 10–24	33,134	
October 10	12:00 p.m.	at Clemson	Memorial Stadium; Clemson, SC	JPS	L 0–23	69,215	
October 17	1:00 p.m.	Wake Forest	Byrd Stadium; College Park, MD		L 10–20	23,419	
October 31	12:00 p.m.	vs. No. 23 Georgia Tech	Ravens Stadium at Camden Yards; Baltimore, MD		L 14–31	25,183	
November 7	12:00 p.m.	at North Carolina	Kenan Memorial Stadium; Chapel Hill, NC	ESPN2	L 13–24	51,200	
November 14	12:00 p.m.	at Duke	Wallace Wade Stadium; Durham, NC	JPS	W 42–25	15,272	
November 21	1:00 p.m.	NC State	Byrd Stadium; College Park, MD		L 21–35	21,589	
*Non-conference game; Rankings from AP Poll released prior to the game; All times are in Eastern time

== Roster ==
1998 Maryland Terrapins football team roster
Players
Coaches
Offense

Pos.	#	Name	Class
QB	5	Trey Evans	Jr
OT	66	John Feugill	Sr
C	67	Melvin Fowler	Fr
TE	92	Mike Hull	So
RB	15	LaMont Jordan	So
FB	45	Matt Kalapinski	So
FB	31	Chad Killian	Fr
TE	88	Matt Murphy	Fr
TE	46	John Waerig	Jr

Defense

Pos.	#	Name	Class
LB	44	Eric Barton	Sr
CB	26	Bryn Boggs	Jr
DT	96	Todd Bradley	Fr
DE	93	Eric Calendine	Jr
CB	21	Mike Castleberry	Jr
DT	91	Delbert Cowsette	Jr
CB	25	Cliff Crosby	Sr
LB	42	E. J. Henderson	Fr
DT	98	Charles Hill	Fr
DT	57	Kris Jenkins	So
LB	32	Kendall Ogle	Sr
CB	11	Tony Okanlawon	Fr
CB	37	Lewis Sanders	Jr

Special teams

Pos.	#	Name	Class

Head coach

- Ron Vanderlinden

Coordinators/assistant coaches

Legend

- (C) Team captain
- (S) Suspended
- (I) Ineligible
- Injured
- Redshirt

Roster
