= 1996 Wake Forest Demon Deacons football team =

American college football season

1996 Wake Forest Demon Deacons football
- Conference: Atlantic Coast Conference
- Record: 3–8 (1–7 ACC)
- Head coach: Jim Caldwell (4th season)
- Offensive coordinator: Jan Quarless (2nd season)
- Offensive scheme: Pro-style
- Defensive coordinator: Chris Allen (4th season)
- Base defense: 4–3
- Captains: William Clark; Harold Gragg; Doug Marsigli; Tom Steutzer
- Home stadium: Groves Stadium

1996 Atlantic Coast Conference football standings
	Conf.			Overall
Team	W		L	W		L
No. 3 Florida State $	8	–	0	11	–	1
No. 10 North Carolina	6	–	2	10	–	2
Clemson	6	–	2	7	–	5
Virginia	5	–	3	7	–	5
Georgia Tech	4	–	4	5	–	6
Maryland	3	–	5	5	–	6
NC State	3	–	5	3	–	8
Wake Forest	1	–	7	3	–	8
Duke	0	–	8	0	–	11
$ – Conference champion; Rankings from AP Poll

The 1996 Wake Forest Demon Deacons football team was an American football team that represented Wake Forest University during the 1996 NCAA Division I-A football season. In their fourth season under head coach Jim Caldwell, the Demon Deacons compiled a 3–8 record and finished in a tie for sixth place in the Atlantic Coast Conference.

== Schedule ==
Date	Time	Opponent	Site	TV	Result	Attendance	Source
August 29	7:30 pm	Appalachian State*	Groves Stadium; Winston-Salem, NC		W 19–13	21,129	
September 7	6:30 pm	No. 13 Northwestern*	Groves Stadium; Winston-Salem, NC	FSN	W 28–27	21,749	
September 14	7:00 pm	at Georgia Tech	Bobby Dodd Stadium; Atlanta, GA		L 10–30	45,750	
September 21	12:00 pm	No. 20 Virginia	Groves Stadium; Winston-Salem, NC	JPS	L 7–42	23,220	
September 28	12:00 pm	at Clemson	Memorial Stadium; Clemson, SC	JPS	L 10–21	63,263	
October 5	6:30 pm	No. 15 North Carolina	Groves Stadium; Winston-Salem, NC (rivalry)		L 6–45	25,681	
October 19	2:00 pm	at Maryland	Byrd Stadium; College Park, MD		L 0–52	30,212	
October 26	1:00 pm	Navy*	Groves Stadium; Winston-Salem, NC		L 18–47	17,307	
November 9	12:00 pm	vs. No. 3 Florida State	Florida Citrus Bowl; Orlando, FL	JPS	L 7–44	34,974	
November 16	1:00 pm	Duke	Groves Stadium; Winston-Salem, NC (rivalry)		W 17–16	17,842	
November 23	1:00 pm	at NC State	Carter–Finley Stadium; Raleigh, NC (rivalry)		L 22–37	40,500	
*Non-conference game; Rankings from AP Poll released prior to the game; All times are in Eastern time

== Roster ==
1996 Wake Forest Demon Deacons football team roster
Players
Coaches
Offense

Pos.	#	Name	Class
WR	6	Brandon Perry	So
QB	13	Ben Sankey	Fr
QB	17	Brian Kuklick	So
WR	21	Jammie Deese	Fr
OL	79	John Whitehead	Fr
WR	80	William Merritt	So
WR	81	Thabiti Davis	Jr
WR	82	Kai Snead	Jr
WR	83	Desmond Clark	So
TE	85	Joe Zelenka	So

Defense

Pos.	#	Name	Class
DB	27	Kenyon Chavis	Jr
LB	43	Dustin Lyman	Fr
DT	90	Fred Robbins	Fr

Special teams

Pos.	#	Name	Class

Head coach

- Jim Caldwell

Coordinators/assistant coaches

Legend

- (C) Team captain
- (S) Suspended
- (I) Ineligible
- Injured
- Redshirt

Roster
Last update: 1997-01-31

== Team leaders ==
Category	Team Leader	Att/Cth	Yds
Passing	Brian Kuklick	205/396	2,526
Rushing	Morgan Kane	128	454
Receiving	Desmond Clark	61	782
