= 1991 Virginia Cavaliers football team =

American college football season

1991 Virginia Cavaliers football

Gator Bowl, L 14–48 vs. Oklahoma
- Conference: Atlantic Coast Conference
- Record: 8–3–1 (4–2–1 ACC)
- Head coach: George Welsh (10th season)
- Offensive coordinator: Tom O'Brien (1st season)
- Defensive coordinator: Rick Lantz (1st season)
- Captains: Matt Blundin; Tyrone Lewis; Don Reynolds; Ray Roberts
- Home stadium: Scott Stadium

1991 Atlantic Coast Conference football standings
	Conf.					Overall
Team	W		L		T	W		L		T
No. 18 Clemson $	6	–	0	–	1	9	–	2	–	1
No. 24 NC State	5	–	2	–	0	9	–	3	–	0
Georgia Tech	5	–	2	–	0	8	–	5	–	0
Virginia	4	–	2	–	1	8	–	3	–	1
North Carolina	3	–	4	–	0	7	–	4	–	0
Maryland	2	–	5	–	0	2	–	9	–	0
Duke	1	–	6	–	0	4	–	6	–	1
Wake Forest	1	–	6	–	0	3	–	8	–	0
$ – Conference champion; Rankings from AP Poll

The 1991 Virginia Cavaliers football team represented the University of Virginia as a member of the Atlantic Coast Conference (ACC) during the 1991 NCAA Division I-A football season. Led by tenth-year head coach George Welsh, the Cavaliers compiled an overall record of 8–3–1 with a mark of 4–2–1 in conference play, placing fourth in the ACC. Virginia was invited to the Gator Bowl, where the Cavaliers lost to Oklahoma. The team played home games at Scott Stadium in Charlottesville, Virginia.

== Schedule ==
Date	Time	Opponent	Rank	Site	TV	Result	Attendance	Source
September 7	12:10 pm	at Maryland		Byrd Stadium; College Park, MD (rivalry)	JPS	L 6–17	36,198	
September 14	7:00 pm	Navy*		Scott Stadium; Charlottesville, VA		W 17–10	42,400	
September 19	8:00 pm	at No. 17 Georgia Tech		Bobby Dodd Stadium; Atlanta, GA	ESPN	L 21–24	42,192	
September 28	1:00 pm	Duke		Scott Stadium; Charlottesville, VA		W 34–3	43,400	
October 5	1:00 pm	Kansas*^{†}		Scott Stadium; Charlottesville, VA		W 31–19	40,200	
October 12	3:30 pm	at No. 18 Clemson		Memorial Stadium; Clemson, SC	ABC	T 20–20	82,333	
October 19	12:10 pm	North Carolina		Scott Stadium; Charlottesville, VA (South's Oldest Rivalry)	JPS	W 14–9	40,100	
October 26	4:00 pm	Wake Forest		Scott Stadium; Charlottesville, VA		W 48–7	41,900	
November 2	1:00 pm	VMI*		Scott Stadium; Charlottesville, VA		W 42–0	39,000	
November 9	12:10 pm	at No. 18 NC State	No. 24	Carter–Finley Stadium; Raleigh, NC	JPS	W 42–10	41,109	
November 23	12:10 pm	Virginia Tech*	No. 20	Scott Stadium; Charlottesville, VA (rivalry)	JPS	W 38–0	44,100	
December 29	8:00 pm	vs. No. 20 Oklahoma*	No. 19	Gator Bowl Stadium; Jacksonville, FL (Gator Bowl)	TBS	L 14–48	62,003	
*Non-conference game; ^{†}Homecoming; Rankings from AP Poll released prior to the game

== Roster ==
1991 Virginia Cavaliers football team roster
Players
Coaches
Offense

Pos.	#	Name	Class
QB	14	Matt Blundin
RB	30	Charles Way
RB	42	Terry Kirby
OT	72	Ray Roberts

Defense

Pos.	#	Name	Class
DB	25	Keith Lyle
DE	85	Chris Slade

Special teams

Pos.	#	Name	Class
K	18	Michael Husted	Jr

Head coach

- George Welsh

Coordinators/assistant coaches

- Jim Bollman (OL)

Legend

- (C) Team captain
- (S) Suspended
- (I) Ineligible
- Injured
- Redshirt

Roster
