= 1998 Duke Blue Devils football team =

American college football season

1998 Duke Blue Devils football
- Conference: Atlantic Coast Conference
- Record: 4–7 (2–6 ACC)
- Head coach: Fred Goldsmith (5th season)
- Offensive coordinator: Les Koenning (1st season)
- Defensive coordinator: Bob Trott (3rd season)
- MVP: Scottie Montgomery
- Captains: Lennie Friedman; Dawud Rasheed; Eric Scanlan
- Home stadium: Wallace Wade Stadium

1998 Atlantic Coast Conference football standings
	Conf.			Overall
Team	W		L	W		L
No. 3 Florida State $+	7	–	1	11	–	2
No. 9 Georgia Tech +	7	–	1	10	–	2
No. 18 Virginia	6	–	2	9	–	3
North Carolina	5	–	3	7	–	5
NC State	5	–	3	7	–	5
Duke	2	–	6	4	–	7
Wake Forest	2	–	6	3	–	8
Clemson	1	–	7	3	–	8
Maryland	1	–	7	3	–	8
$ – BCS representative as conference champion; + – Conference co-champions; Rankings from AP Poll

The 1998 Duke Blue Devils football team represented Duke University as a member of the Atlantic Coast Conference (ACC) during the 1998 NCAA Division I-A football season. Led by Fred Goldsmith in his fifth and final season as head coach, the Blue Devils compiled an overall record of 4–7 with a mark of 2–6 in conference play, tying for sixth place in the ACC. The team played home games at Wallace Wade Stadium in Durham, North Carolina.

Goldsmith was fired after the season.

== Schedule ==
Date	Time	Opponent	Site	TV	Result	Attendance	Source
September 5	7:00 pm	Western Carolina*	Wallace Wade Stadium; Durham, NC		W 24–10	22,460	
September 12	12:00 pm	at Northwestern*	Ryan Field; Evanston, IL	ESPN Plus	W 44–10	40,178	
September 19	7:00 pm	at No. 11 Florida State	Doak Campbell Stadium; Tallahassee, FL	PPV	L 13–62	80,032	
September 26	12:00 pm	No. 11 Virginia^{†}	Wallace Wade Stadium; Durham, NC	JPS	L 0–24	24,380	
October 3	12:00 pm	at Georgia Tech	Bobby Dodd Stadium; Atlanta, GA	JPS	L 13–41	35,724	
October 10	6:30 pm	at Wake Forest	Groves Stadium; Winston-Salem, NC (rivalry)		W 19–16	22,037	
October 17	12:00 pm	at NC State	Carter–Finley Stadium; Raleigh, NC (rivalry)	JPS	L 24–27	50,200	
October 24	1:30 pm	Clemson	Wallace Wade Stadium; Durham, NC		W 28–23	30,630	
October 31	2:00 pm	at Vanderbilt*	Vanderbilt Stadium; Nashville, TN		L 33–36 ^{2OT}	27,214	
November 14	12:00 pm	Maryland	Wallace Wade Stadium; Durham, NC	JPS	L 20–42	15,272	
November 21	12:00 pm	North Carolina	Wallace Wade Stadium; Durham, NC (Victory Bell)	JPS	L 6–28	25,740	
*Non-conference game; ^{†}Homecoming; Rankings from AP Poll released prior to the game; All times are in Eastern time

== Roster ==
1998 Duke Blue Devils football team roster
Players
Coaches
Offense

Pos.	#	Name	Class
C	71	Troy Andrew	So
FL	22	Richmond Flowers	So
G	74	Lennie Friedman	Sr
WR	2	Scottie Montgomery	So

Defense

Pos.	#	Name	Class
SS	13	Darius Clark	Jr
DT	93	Chris Combs	Jr
LB	27	Kevin Lewis	Jr
DT	98	Gannon Shepherd	Jr

Special teams

Pos.	#	Name	Class

Head coach

- Fred Goldsmith

Coordinators/assistant coaches

Legend

- (C) Team captain
- (S) Suspended
- (I) Ineligible
- Injured
- Redshirt

Roster
