= 1998 Florida State Seminoles football team =

American college football season

1998 Florida State Seminoles football

ACC co-champion

Fiesta Bowl (BCS NCG), L 16–23 vs. Tennessee
- Conference: Atlantic Coast Conference

Ranking
- Coaches: No. 3
- AP: No. 3
- Record: 11–2 (7–1 ACC)
- Head coach: Bobby Bowden (23rd season)
- Offensive coordinator: Mark Richt (5th season)
- Offensive scheme: Pro-style
- Defensive coordinator: Mickey Andrews (15th season)
- Base defense: 4–3
- Captains: Lamarr Glenn; Lamont Green; Billy Rhodes; Demetro Stephens
- Home stadium: Doak Campbell Stadium

1998 Atlantic Coast Conference football standings
	Conf.			Overall
Team	W		L	W		L
No. 3 Florida State $+	7	–	1	11	–	2
No. 9 Georgia Tech +	7	–	1	10	–	2
No. 18 Virginia	6	–	2	9	–	3
North Carolina	5	–	3	7	–	5
NC State	5	–	3	7	–	5
Duke	2	–	6	4	–	7
Wake Forest	2	–	6	3	–	8
Clemson	1	–	7	3	–	8
Maryland	1	–	7	3	–	8
$ – BCS representative as conference champion; + – Conference co-champions; Rankings from AP Poll

The 1998 Florida State Seminoles football team represented the Florida State University as a member of the Atlantic Coast Conference (ACC) during the 1998 NCAA Division I-A football season. Led by 23rd-year head coach Bobby Bowden, the Seminoles compiled an overall record of 11–2 with a mark of 7–1 in conference play, sharing he ACC title with Georgia Tech. Florida State was invited to the Fiesta Bowl, the BCS National Championship Game, where the Seminoles lost to Tennessee. The team played home games at Doak Campbell Stadium in Tallahassee, Florida.

== Schedule ==
Date	Time	Opponent	Rank	Site	TV	Result	Attendance	Source
August 31	8:00 p.m.	vs. No. 14 Texas A&M*	No. 2	Giants Stadium; East Rutherford, NJ (Kickoff Classic)	ABC	W 23–14	59,232	
September 12	3:30 p.m.	at NC State	No. 2	Carter–Finley Stadium; Raleigh, NC	ABC	L 7–24	50,800	
September 19	7:00 p.m.	Duke	No. 11	Doak Campbell Stadium; Tallahassee, FL	PPV	W 62–13	80,032	
September 26	3:30 p.m.	No. 18 USC*	No. 10	Doak Campbell Stadium; Tallahassee, FL	ABC	W 30–10	79,815	
October 3	1:00 p.m.	at Maryland	No. 9	Byrd Stadium; College Park, MD	PPV	W 24–10	33,134	
October 10	3:30 p.m.	at Miami (FL)*	No. 8	Miami Orange Bowl; Miami, FL (rivalry)	CBS	W 26–14	63,617	
October 17	6:00 p.m.	Clemson^{†}	No. 6	Doak Campbell Stadium; Tallahassee, FL (rivalry)	ESPN2	W 48–0	80,310	
October 24	7:00 p.m.	at No. 20 Georgia Tech	No. 6	Bobby Dodd Stadium; Atlanta, GA (College GameDay)	ESPN	W 34–7	46,362	
October 31	7:45 p.m.	North Carolina	No. 5	Doak Campbell Stadium; Tallahassee, FL	ESPN	W 39–13	80,050	
November 7	3:30 p.m.	No. 12 Virginia	No. 6	Doak Campbell Stadium; Tallahassee, FL (Jefferson–Eppes Trophy)	ABC	W 45–14	81,120	
November 14	5:00 p.m.	at Wake Forest	No. 5	Groves Stadium; Winston-Salem, NC	ESPN2	W 24–7	19,193	
November 21	3:30 p.m.	No. 4 Florida*	No. 5	Doak Campbell Stadium; Tallahassee, FL (rivalry)	ABC	W 23–12	81,614	
January 4	8:00 p.m.	vs. No. 1 Tennessee*	No. 2	Sun Devil Stadium; Tempe, AZ (Fiesta Bowl, College GameDay)	ABC	L 16–23	80,470	
*Non-conference game; ^{†}Homecoming; Rankings from AP Poll released prior to the game; All times are in Eastern time

== Rankings ==
Ranking movements Legend: ██ Increase in ranking ██ Decrease in ranking ( ) = First-place votes
	Week															
Poll	Pre	1	2	3	4	5	6	7	8	9	10	11	12	13	14	Final
AP	2 (22)	2 (22)	11	10	9	8	6	6	5	6	5 (1)	5	4	4	2	3
Coaches Poll	2 (10)	2 (12)	11	11	10	9	7	6	6	6	5	5	4	4	2 (1)	3
BCS	Not released								5	6	4	4	4	4	2	Not released

== Roster ==
1998 Florida State Seminoles football team roster
Players
Coaches
Offense

Pos.	#	Name	Class
WR	7	Laveranues Coles	Jr
WR	9	Peter Warrick	Jr
QB	10	Dan Kendra	Jr
WR	13	Snoop Minnis	So
QB	16	Chris Weinke	So
RB	23	Travis Minor	So
RB	33	Dee Feaster	Sr
G	68	Jason Whitaker	Jr
G	78	Donald Heaven	So

Defense

Pos.	#	Name	Class
FS	11	Dexter Jackson	Sr
CB	15	Mario Edwards	Sr
FS	16	Sean Key	Sr
CB	27	Tay Cody	So
LB	29	Tommy Polley	So
LB	40	Lamont Green	Sr
DL	53	Corey Simon	Jr

Special teams

Pos.	#	Name	Class
K	38	Sebastian Janikowski	So
P	47	Keith Cottrell	So

Head coach

- Bobby Bowden

Coordinators/assistant coaches

Legend

- (C) Team captain
- (S) Suspended
- (I) Ineligible
- Injured
- Redshirt
