= Joe Krivak =

American football player and coach (1935–2012)

Biographical details
- Born: March 20, 1935; Central City, Pennsylvania, U.S.
- Died: December 25, 2012 (aged 77); Bowie, Maryland, U.S.

Playing career
- 1954–1956: Syracuse
- Positions: Offensive lineman, linebacker

Coaching career (HC unless noted)
- 1958–1960: Madonna HS (WV) (assistant)
- 1961–1968: Madonna HS (WV)
- 1969–1973: Syracuse (WR)
- 1974–1976: Maryland (assistant)
- 1977–1981: Navy (assistant)
- 1982–1986: Maryland (QB/WR)
- 1987–1991: Maryland
- 1995–1996: Virginia (QB)

Head coaching record
- Overall: 20–34–2 (college); 50–24–2 (high school)
- Bowls: 0–0–1

Joseph John Krivak (March 20, 1935 – December 25, 2012) was an American football player and coach. He served as head coach for the Maryland Terrapins football team from 1987 to 1991, where he compiled a 20–34–2 record. He also served as an assistant coach at Maryland, Syracuse, Navy, and Virginia. As a coach at Maryland, Krivak mentored future National Football League (NFL) quarterbacks Boomer Esiason, Neil O'Donnell, Frank Reich, Stan Gelbaugh, and Scott Zolak. In all, he coached on seven Atlantic Coast Conference (ACC) championship team staffs and in 14 bowl games as an assistant or head coach.

== Playing career ==
Krivak earned three football letters playing offensive line and linebacker for the Syracuse Orangemen between 1954 and 1956. He blocked for All-American running back Jim Brown and helped the Orange reach the 1957 Cotton Bowl Classic. He also played third base and earned one letter in baseball for the Orangemen. Krivak earned his degree in history science in 1957 and an M.A. in education from Syracuse in 1961. Syracuse University honored Krivak in 2011 as a letterwinner of distinction at their Hall of Fame.

== Coaching career ==
=== High school ===
Krivak's first coaching experience came at Madonna High School in Weirton, West Virginia, where he spent 11 seasons, eight as head coach, and won a state Catholic title.

=== Assistant coach ===
He then served as an assistant coach at Syracuse for five years under head coach Ben Schwartzwalder. From 1974 to 1976, he served as an assistant coach at Maryland under head coach Jerry Claiborne. He then spent five years coaching at Navy under George Welsh.

In 1982, he returned to Maryland to join Bobby Ross's staff as the quarterbacks coach. Krivak was also responsible for the wide receivers and had a significant role in running the offense. Krivak was the offensive play caller for Maryland's 42–40 win over Miami in the Orange Bowl, where the Terps rallied from a 31–0 halftime deficit. It was a game which stood as the greatest comeback in college football history for twenty-two years. At Maryland, Krivak tutored several future NFL quarterbacks: Boomer Esiason, Neil O'Donnell, Frank Reich, Stan Gelbaugh, and Scott Zolak.

=== Maryland ===
After the 1986 season, he was chosen to be the successor to Ross and promoted to Maryland head coach at the age of 51. (Ross left Maryland for Georgia Tech following the Len Bias tragedy and the university's reactionary hiking of recruiting standards.) Krivak had previously been a finalist for a head coaching position during his tenure at both Syracuse and Navy, and in 1982 when Maryland hired Ross. As head coach, Krivak accumulated a 20–34–2 record and one minor bowl game appearance, the 1990 Independence Bowl, in which Maryland tied Louisiana Tech, 34–34. One of Krivak's most notable accomplishments at Maryland was a tie game. In 1989, Maryland tied Penn State, 13–13, with a last-minute field goal. When the game was last played in 1993, the all-time series record stood at 35 Maryland losses, one win, and one tie. The tie game broke the Terrapins' 24-game losing streak against Penn State. Krivak's signature win however, was the 1990 upset road win against #8 and Sugar Bowl bound Virginia. Following the 1990 season, new athletic director Andy Geiger and Krivak agreed to a five-year contract extension.

Krivak tendered his resignation after posting a 2–9 record during an injury riddled 1991 campaign. After the season, athletic director Andy Geiger had initiated a review of the program, which included interviews with the players, some of whom directly criticized Krivak to Geiger. With his resignation, Krivak cited a loss of credibility in the face of the criticism from his players.

=== Return to assistant coaching ===
In 1993, The Richmond Times-Dispatch reported that Bobby Ross, then head coach of the San Diego Chargers was interested in hiring Krivak after his dismissal, but was dissuaded by general manager Bobby Beathard, who wanted someone with NFL coaching experience. In 1995, Krivak took over as quarterbacks coach for Virginia under George Welsh, his former boss at Navy. In 1996, Virginia offensive coordinator Tom O'Brien left to take the head coaching position at Boston College, and during the Carquest Bowl, Krivak called the offensive plays in the interim. Virginia lost to Miami, 31–21. Some observers expected Krivak to be promoted to the position full-time, but in February 1997, Welsh said he was considering calling plays himself without an offensive coordinator. Krivak resigned from the staff shortly afterward. Krivak then ran football camps for youth players in the Mid-Atlantic area.

== Death ==
Krivak died at the age of 77 on Christmas Day 2012 in Bowie, Maryland after a long battle with myelodysplastic syndrome (MDS) and leukemia.

== Head coaching record ==
=== College ===
Year	Team	Overall	Conference	Standing	Bowl/playoffs
Maryland Terrapins (Atlantic Coast Conference) (1987–1991)
1987	Maryland	4–7	3–3	5th	
1988	Maryland	5–6	4–3	T–4th	
1989	Maryland	3–7–1	2–5	6th	
1990	Maryland	6–5–1	4–3	4th	T Independence
1991	Maryland	2–9	2–5	6th	
Maryland:		20–34–2	15–19		
Total:		20–34–2			
