= 1991 North Carolina Tar Heels football team =

American college football season

1991 North Carolina Tar Heels football
- Conference: Atlantic Coast Conference
- Record: 7–4 (3–4 ACC)
- Head coach: Mack Brown (4th season)
- Offensive scheme: Multiple
- Defensive coordinator: Carl Torbush (4th season)
- Base defense: 4–3
- Captain: Dwight Hollier
- Home stadium: Kenan Memorial Stadium

1991 Atlantic Coast Conference football standings
	Conf.					Overall
Team	W		L		T	W		L		T
No. 18 Clemson $	6	–	0	–	1	9	–	2	–	1
No. 24 NC State	5	–	2	–	0	9	–	3	–	0
Georgia Tech	5	–	2	–	0	8	–	5	–	0
Virginia	4	–	2	–	1	8	–	3	–	1
North Carolina	3	–	4	–	0	7	–	4	–	0
Maryland	2	–	5	–	0	2	–	9	–	0
Duke	1	–	6	–	0	4	–	6	–	1
Wake Forest	1	–	6	–	0	3	–	8	–	0
$ – Conference champion; Rankings from AP Poll

The 1991 North Carolina Tar Heels football team represented the University of North Carolina at Chapel Hill during the 1991 NCAA Division I-A football season. The Tar Heels played their home games at Kenan Memorial Stadium in Chapel Hill, North Carolina and competed in the Atlantic Coast Conference. The team was led by head coach Mack Brown.

== Schedule ==
Date	Time	Opponent	Rank	Site	TV	Result	Attendance	Source
September 14	7:00 p.m.	Cincinnati*		Kenan Memorial Stadium; Chapel Hill, NC		W 51–16	51,800	
September 21	1:00 p.m.	at Army*		Michie Stadium; West Point, NY		W 20–12	36,609	
September 28	12:00 p.m.	at NC State	No. 23	Carter–Finley Stadium; Raleigh, NC (rivalry)		L 7–24	53,928	
October 5	1:30 p.m.	No. T–20 (I-AA) William & Mary*		Kenan Memorial Stadium; Chapel Hill, NC		W 59–36	44,500	
October 12	1:30 p.m.	Wake Forest		Kenan Memorial Stadium; Chapel Hill, NC (rivalry)		W 24–10	49,200	
October 19	12:10 p.m.	at Virginia		Scott Stadium; Charlottesville, VA (South's Oldest Rivalry)		L 9–14	40,100	
October 26	12:10 p.m.	at Georgia Tech		Bobby Dodd Stadium; Atlanta, GA	Raycom	L 14–35	45,542	
November 2	12:10 p.m.	Maryland		Kenan Memorial Stadium; Chapel Hill, NC		W 24–0	50,000	
November 9	7:30 p.m.	No. 15 Clemson		Kenan Memorial Stadium; Chapel Hill, NC	ESPN	L 6–21	31,000	
November 16	1:30 p.m.	South Carolina*		Kenan Memorial Stadium; Chapel Hill, NC (rivalry)		W 21–17	47,500	
November 23	12:10 p.m.	Duke		Kenan Memorial Stadium; Chapel Hill, NC (Victory Bell)		W 47–14	50,500	
*Non-conference game; Rankings from AP Poll released prior to the game; All times are in Eastern time
