= 1991 Clemson Tigers football team =

American college football season

1991 Clemson Tigers football

ACC champion

Florida Citrus Bowl, L 13–37 vs. California
- Conference: Atlantic Coast Conference

Ranking
- Coaches: No. 17
- AP: No. 18
- Record: 9–2–1 (6–0–1 ACC)
- Head coach: Ken Hatfield (2nd season)
- Offensive coordinator: Larry Van Der Hayden (2nd season)
- Defensive coordinator: Ron Dickerson (1st season)
- Captains: Rob Bodine; DeChane Cameron; Levon Kirkland
- Home stadium: Memorial Stadium

1991 Atlantic Coast Conference football standings
| | Conf. | | | | | Overall |
| Team | W | | L | | T | W | | L | | T |
|---|---|---|---|---|---|---|---|---|---|---|
| No. 18 Clemson $ | 6 | – | 0 | – | 1 | 9 | – | 2 | – | 1 |
| No. 24 NC State | 5 | – | 2 | – | 0 | 9 | – | 3 | – | 0 |
| Georgia Tech | 5 | – | 2 | – | 0 | 8 | – | 5 | – | 0 |
| Virginia | 4 | – | 2 | – | 1 | 8 | – | 3 | – | 1 |
| North Carolina | 3 | – | 4 | – | 0 | 7 | – | 4 | – | 0 |
| Maryland | 2 | – | 5 | – | 0 | 2 | – | 9 | – | 0 |
| Duke | 1 | – | 6 | – | 0 | 4 | – | 6 | – | 1 |
| Wake Forest | 1 | – | 6 | – | 0 | 3 | – | 8 | – | 0 |
$ – Conference champion; Rankings from AP Poll

The 1991 Clemson Tigers football team represented Clemson University as a member of the Atlantic Coast Conference (ACC) during the 1991 NCAA Division I-A football season. Led by second-year head coach Ken Hatfield, the Tigers compiled an overall record of 9–2–1 with a mark of 6–0–1 in conference play, winning the ACC title. Clemson was invited to the Florida Citrus Bowl, where the Tigers lost to California. The team played home games at Memorial Stadium in Clemson, South Carolina.

== Schedule ==
| Date | Time | Opponent | Rank | Site | TV | Result | Attendance | Source |
|---|---|---|---|---|---|---|---|---|
| September 7 | 1:00 p.m. | Appalachian State* | No. 8 | Memorial Stadium; Clemson, SC | | W 34–0 | 74,127 | |
| September 21 | 1:00 p.m. | Temple* | No. 8 | Memorial Stadium; Clemson, SC | | W 37–7 | 74,575 | |
| September 28 | 3:30 p.m. | No. 19 Georgia Tech | No. 7 | Memorial Stadium; Clemson, SC (rivalry) | ABC | W 9–7 | 83,194 | |
| October 5 | 7:45 p.m. | at Georgia* | No. 6 | Sanford Stadium; Athens, GA (rivalry) | ESPN | L 12–27 | 85,434 | |
| October 12 | 3:30 p.m. | Virginia | No. 18 | Memorial Stadium; Clemson, SC | ABC | T 20–20 | 82,333 | |
| October 26 | 3:30 p.m. | No. 12 NC State | No. 19 | Memorial Stadium; Clemson, SC (Textile Bowl) | ABC | W 29–19 | 79,832 | |
| November 2 | 1:00 p.m. | Wake Forest | No. 16 | Memorial Stadium; Clemson, SC | | W 28–10 | 68,955 | |
| November 9 | 7:30 p.m. | at North Carolina | No. 15 | Kenan Memorial Stadium; Chapel Hill, NC | ESPN | W 21–6 | 31,000 | |
| November 16 | 12:00 p.m. | Maryland | No. 15 | Memorial Stadium; Clemson, SC | JPS | W 40–7 | 71,881 | |
| November 23 | 1:30 p.m. | at South Carolina* | No. 14 | Williams–Brice Stadium; Columbia, SC (rivalry) | JPS | W 41–24 | 74,200 | |
| December 1 | 9:30 p.m. | vs. Duke | No. 13 | Tokyo Dome; Tokyo, Japan (Coca-Cola Classic) | | W 33–21 | 50,000 | |
| January 1, 1992 | 1:30 p.m. | vs. No. 14 California* | No. 13 | Florida Citrus Bowl; Orlando, FL (Florida Citrus Bowl) | ABC | L 13–37 | 64,192 | |
*Non-conference game; Rankings from AP Poll released prior to the game; All times are in Eastern time

== Roster ==
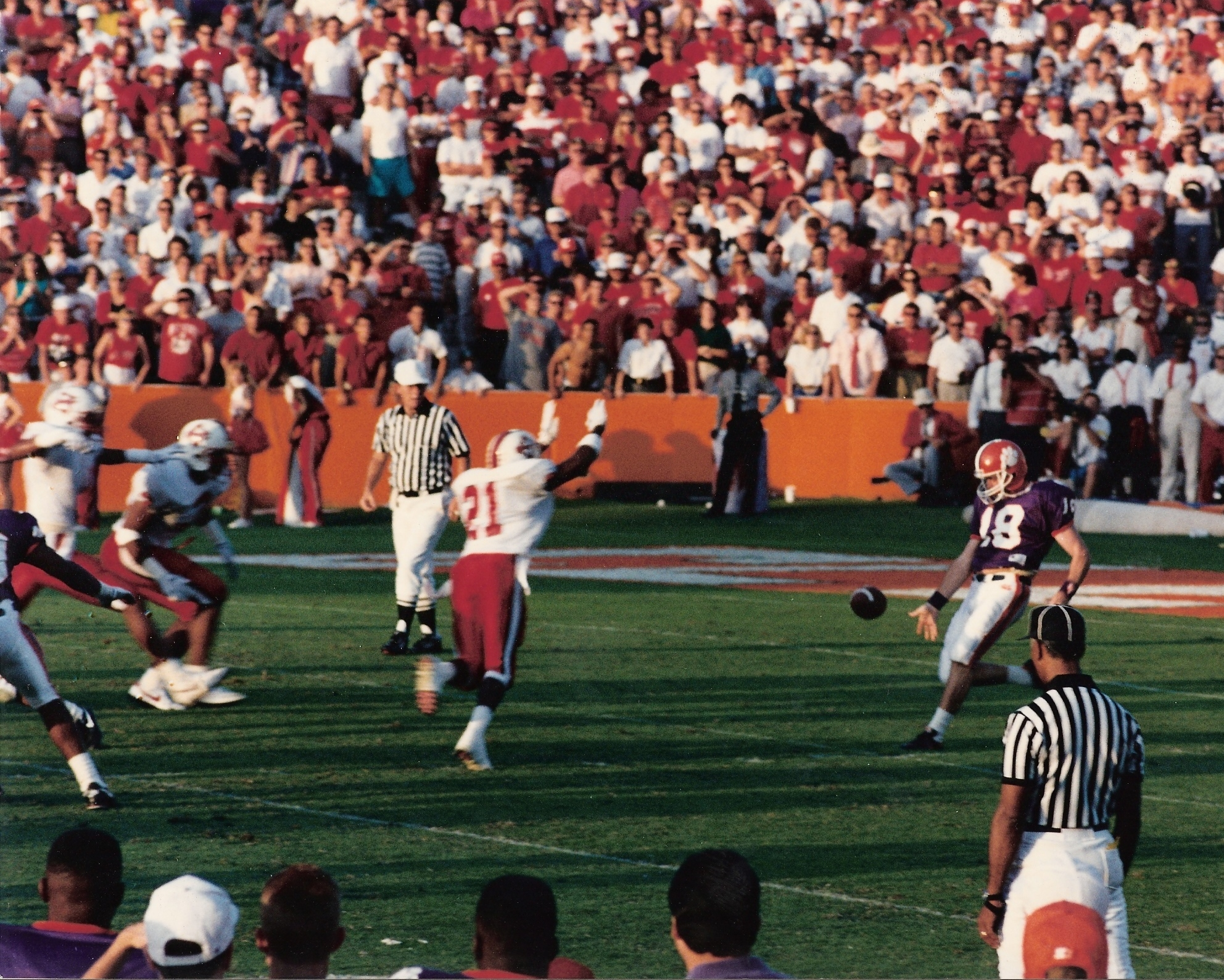
Chet Horton punt against NC State

1991 Clemson Tigers football team roster
Players
Coaches
Offense

| Pos. | # | Name | Class |
|---|---|---|---|
| QB | 10 | DeChane Cameron | Sr |
| QB | 5 | Jimmy McLees | Sr |
| WR | 21 | Sean Ryan | Jr |
| WR | 20 | Larry Ryans | Jr |
| C | 64 | Curtis Whitley | Sr |

Defense

| Pos. | # | Name | Class |
|---|---|---|---|
| LB | 44 | Levon Kirkland | So |
| LB | 93 | Ed McDaniel | Sr |
| DT | 91 | Chester McGlockton | Jr |
| LB | 45 | John McMakin | So |
| CB | 15 | Robert O'Neal | Jr |
| LB | 96 | Ashley Sheppard | Jr |
| LB | 49 | Wayne Simmons | Jr |
| CB | 27 | James Trapp | Jr |

Special teams

| Pos. | # | Name | Class |
|---|---|---|---|
| K/P | 2 | Nelson Welch | So |

Head coach

- Ken Hatfield

Coordinators/assistant coaches

Legend

- (C) Team captain
- (S) Suspended
- (I) Ineligible
- Injured
- Redshirt

Roster

== After the season ==
=== NFL draft ===
The following Tigers were selected in the 1992 NFL draft after the season.

| Round | Pick | Player | Position | NFL team |
|---|---|---|---|---|
| 1 | 16 | Chester McGlockton | Defensive tackle | Los Angeles Raiders |
| 2 | 38 | Levon Kirkland | Linebacker | Pittsburgh Steelers |
| 5 | 117 | Curtis Whitley | Center | San Diego Chargers |
| 5 | 125 | Ed McDaniel | Linebacker | Minnesota Vikings |
