= 1998 Clemson Tigers football team =

American college football season

1998 Clemson Tigers football
- Conference: Atlantic Coast Conference
- Record: 3–8 (1–7 ACC)
- Head coach: Tommy West (5th season)
- Offensive coordinator: Steve Ensminger (2nd season)
- Defensive coordinator: Les Herrin (2nd season)
- Captains: Donald Broomfield; Holland Postell
- Home stadium: Memorial Stadium

1998 Atlantic Coast Conference football standings
	Conf.			Overall
Team	W		L	W		L
No. 3 Florida State $+	7	–	1	11	–	2
No. 9 Georgia Tech +	7	–	1	10	–	2
No. 18 Virginia	6	–	2	9	–	3
North Carolina	5	–	3	7	–	5
NC State	5	–	3	7	–	5
Duke	2	–	6	4	–	7
Wake Forest	2	–	6	3	–	8
Clemson	1	–	7	3	–	8
Maryland	1	–	7	3	–	8
$ – BCS representative as conference champion; + – Conference co-champions; Rankings from AP Poll

The 1998 Clemson Tigers football team represented Clemson University as a member of the Atlantic Coast Conference (ACC) during the 1998 NCAA Division I-A football season. Led by Tommy West in his fifth and final season as head coach, the Tigers compiled an overall record of 3–8 with a mark of 1–7 in conference play, tying for eighth place in the ACC. Clemson played home games at Memorial Stadium in Clemson, South Carolina.

West was fired shortly after the conclusion of the season.

== Schedule ==
Date	Time	Opponent	Site	TV	Result	Attendance	Source
September 5	1:00 p.m.	Furman*	Memorial Stadium; Clemson, SC		W 33–0	70,855	
September 12	1:00 p.m.	Virginia Tech*	Memorial Stadium; Clemson, SC		L 0–37	66,431	
September 19	3:30 p.m.	at No. 10 Virginia	Scott Stadium; Charlottesville, VA	ABC	L 18–20	42,000	
September 26	12:00 p.m.	Wake Forest	Memorial Stadium; Clemson, SC	ABC	L 19–29	61,632	
October 3	3:30 p.m.	at North Carolina	Kenan Memorial Stadium; Chapel Hill, NC	ABC	L 14–21	56,650	
October 10	12:00 p.m.	Maryland	Memorial Stadium; Clemson, SC	JPS	W 23–0	69,215	
October 17	6:00 p.m.	at No. 6 Florida State	Doak Campbell Stadium; Tallahassee, FL (rivalry)	ESPN2	L 0–48	80,310	
October 24	1:30 p.m.	at Duke	Wallace Wade Stadium; Durham, NC		L 23–28	30,630	
October 31	12:00 p.m.	NC State	Memorial Stadium; Clemson, SC (Textile Bowl)	JPS	L 39–46	63,624	
November 12	8:00 p.m.	No. 22 Georgia Tech	Memorial Stadium; Clemson, SC (rivalry)	ESPN	L 21–24	62,012	
November 21	6:30 p.m.	South Carolina*	Memorial Stadium; Clemson, SC (rivalry)	ESPN2	W 28–19	84,423	
*Non-conference game; Rankings from AP Poll released prior to the game; All times are in Eastern time
