= 1991 Maryland Terrapins football team =

American college football season

1991 Maryland Terrapins football
- Conference: Atlantic Coast Conference
- Record: 2–9 (2–5 ACC)
- Head coach: Joe Krivak (5th season)
- Defensive coordinator: Greg Williams (5th season)
- Home stadium: Byrd Stadium

1991 Atlantic Coast Conference football standings
	Conf.					Overall
Team	W		L		T	W		L		T
No. 18 Clemson $	6	–	0	–	1	9	–	2	–	1
No. 24 NC State	5	–	2	–	0	9	–	3	–	0
Georgia Tech	5	–	2	–	0	8	–	5	–	0
Virginia	4	–	2	–	1	8	–	3	–	1
North Carolina	3	–	4	–	0	7	–	4	–	0
Maryland	2	–	5	–	0	2	–	9	–	0
Duke	1	–	6	–	0	4	–	6	–	1
Wake Forest	1	–	6	–	0	3	–	8	–	0
$ – Conference champion; Rankings from AP Poll

The 1991 Maryland Terrapins football team represented the University of Maryland in the 1991 NCAA Division I-A football season. In their fifth and final season under head coach Joe Krivak, the Terrapins compiled a 2–9 record, finished in sixth place in the Atlantic Coast Conference, and were outscored by their opponents 302 to 138. The team's statistical leaders included Jim Sandwisch with 1,499 passing yards, Mark Mason with 452 rushing yards, and Frank Wycheck with 438 receiving yards.

== Schedule ==
Date	Opponent	Site	Result	Attendance	Source
September 7	Virginia	Byrd Stadium; College Park, MD (rivalry)	W 17–6	36,198	
September 14	No. 22 Syracuse*	Byrd Stadium; College Park, MD	L 17–31	41,310	
September 21	West Virginia*	Byrd Stadium; College Park, MD (rivalry)	L 7–37	40,442	
October 5	at No. 17 Pittsburgh*	Pitt Stadium; Pittsburgh, PA	L 20–24	38,328	
October 12	at Georgia Tech	Bobby Dodd Stadium; Atlanta, GA	L 10–34	42,011	
October 19	at Wake Forest	Groves Stadium; Winston-Salem, NC	W 23–22	17,342	
October 26	Duke	Byrd Stadium; College Park, MD	L 13–17	35,423	
November 2	at North Carolina	Kenan Memorial Stadium; Chapel Hill, NC	L 0–24	50,000	
November 9	No. 9 Penn State*	Memorial Stadium; Baltimore, MD (rivalry)	L 7–47	57,416	
November 16	at No. 15 Clemson	Memorial Stadium; Clemson, SC	L 7–40	71,881	
November 23	at No. 22 NC State	Carter–Finley Stadium; Raleigh, NC	L 17–20	36,491	
*Non-conference game; Rankings from AP Poll released prior to the game

== Roster ==
1991 Maryland Terrapins football team roster
Players			Coaches
Offense: Pos. / # / Name / Class; WR / 22 / Frank Wycheck / Jr	Defense: Pos. / # / Name / Class; DT / 51 / Joe Bergstorm / So	Special teams: Pos. / # / Name / Class	Head coach: Joe Krivak; Coordinators/assistant coaches: Paul Castonia (GA); Legend: (C) Team captain; (S) Suspended; (I) Ineligible; Injured; Redshirt

== NFL draft ==
The following Terrapins were selected in the 1992 NFL draft after the season.

Round	Pick	Player	Position	NFL team
3	70	Larry Webster	Defensive tackle	Miami Dolphins
7	169	Derek Steele	Defensive end	Indianapolis Colts
