= James Brim =

American football player (born 1963)

No. 84
- Position: Wide receiver

Personal information
- Born: February 28, 1963 (age 63); Mount Airy, North Carolina, U.S.
- Listed height: 6 ft 3 in (1.91 m)
- Listed weight: 187 lb (85 kg)

Career information
- High school: Mount Airy
- College: Wake Forest
- NFL draft: 1987: undrafted

Career history
- St. Louis Cardinals (1987)*; Minnesota Vikings (1987)
- * Offseason or practice squad member only

Awards and highlights
- 2× First-team All-ACC (1985, 1986)
- Stats at Pro Football Reference

James Hamilton Brim (born February 28, 1963) is an American former professional football wide receiver who played for the Minnesota Vikings of the National Football League (NFL). He played college football for the Wake Forest Demon Deacons.

== Early life ==
James Hamilton Brim was born on February 28, 1963, in Mount Airy, North Carolina. He attended Mount Airy High School.

== College career ==
Brim enrolled at Wake Forest University to play college football for the Demon Deacons. He was a four-year letterman from 1983 to 1986. He earned Associated Press first-team All-Atlantic Coast Conference (ACC) honors in both 1985 and 1986. As a senior in 1986, Brim led the ACC in both receptions (66) and receiving yards (930). He finished his college career with 153 catches for 2,040 yards and 12 touchdowns. Brim set several school records during his college career.

== Professional career ==
After going undrafted in the 1987 NFL draft, Brim signed with the St. Louis Cardinals on May 4, 1987. He was waived on August 2, 1987, during training camp.

Brim was claimed off waivers by the Minnesota Vikings on August 5, 1987. He was released on September 4 before the start of the 1987 regular season. He re-signed with the Vikings on September 26, during the 1987 NFL players strike. Brim started all three strike games for the Vikings, catching 18 passes for 282 yards and two touchdowns on 38 targets while also rushing twice for 36 yards and one touchdown. He was placed on injured reserve on October 19, 1987, after the strike ended. Brim was released by the Vikings on August 23, 1988, after the third game of the 1988 preseason.

== Personal life ==
Brim was inducted into the Surry County Sports Hall of Fame in 2011. He became the director of the Food Bank of Northeast Georgia in 2016.

== See also ==
- Wake Forest Demon Deacons football statistical leaders
