= 1998 NC State Wolfpack football team =

American college football team season

1998 NC State Wolfpack football

MicronPC Bowl, L 23–46 vs. Miami (FL)
- Conference: Atlantic Coast Conference
- Record: 7–5 (5–3 ACC)
- Head coach: Mike O'Cain (6th season)
- Offensive coordinator: Jimmy Kiser (2nd season)
- Co-defensive coordinators: Kent Briggs (3rd season); Jeff Snipes (2nd season)
- Home stadium: Carter–Finley Stadium

1998 Atlantic Coast Conference football standings
	Conf.			Overall
Team	W		L	W		L
No. 3 Florida State $+	7	–	1	11	–	2
No. 9 Georgia Tech +	7	–	1	10	–	2
No. 18 Virginia	6	–	2	9	–	3
North Carolina	5	–	3	7	–	5
NC State	5	–	3	7	–	5
Duke	2	–	6	4	–	7
Wake Forest	2	–	6	3	–	8
Clemson	1	–	7	3	–	8
Maryland	1	–	7	3	–	8
$ – BCS representative as conference champion; + – Conference co-champions; Rankings from AP Poll

The 1998 NC State Wolfpack football team represented North Carolina State University during the 1998 NCAA Division I-A football season with Mike O'Cain as its head coach. NC State has been a member of the Atlantic Coast Conference (ACC) since the league's inception in 1953. The Wolfpack played its home games in 1998 at Carter–Finley Stadium in Raleigh, North Carolina, which has been NC State football's home stadium since 1966.

== Schedule ==
Date	Time	Opponent	Rank	Site	TV	Result	Attendance	Source
September 3	7:30 pm	Ohio*		Carter–Finley Stadium; Raleigh, NC		W 34–31	35,500	
September 12	3:30 pm	No. 2 Florida State		Carter–Finley Stadium; Raleigh, NC	ABC	W 24–7	50,800	
September 19	12:30 pm	at Baylor*	No. 20	Floyd Casey Stadium; Waco, TX	FSN	L 30–33	28,734	
October 1	8:00 pm	No. 11 Syracuse*		Carter–Finley Stadium; Raleigh, NC	ESPN	W 38–17	51,200	
October 10	3:30 pm	Georgia Tech	No. 23	Carter–Finley Stadium; Raleigh, NC	ABC	L 24–47	48,600	
October 17	12:00 pm	Duke		Carter–Finley Stadium; Raleigh, NC (rivalry)	JPS	W 27–24	50,200	
October 24	3:30 pm	at No. 16 Virginia		Scott Stadium; Charlottesville, VA	ABC	L 13–23	45,900	
October 31	12:00 pm	at Clemson		Memorial Stadium; Clemson, SC (Textile Bowl)	JPS	W 46–39	63,624	
November 7	12:00 pm	Wake Forest		Carter–Finley Stadium; Raleigh, NC (rivalry)	JPS	W 38–27	51,500	
November 21	1:00 pm	at Maryland		Byrd Stadium; College Park, MD		W 35–21	21,589	
November 28	1:00 pm	vs. North Carolina		Ericsson Stadium; Charlotte, NC (rivalry)	ABC	L 34–37 ^{OT}	68,797	
December 29	7:30 pm	vs. No. 24 Miami (FL)*		Pro Player Stadium; Miami Gardens, FL (MicronPC Bowl)	TBS	L 23–46	44,387	
*Non-conference game; Rankings from AP Poll released prior to the game; All times are in Eastern time

== Rankings ==
Ranking movements Legend: ██ Increase in ranking ██ Decrease in ranking — = Not ranked RV = Received votes
	Week															
Poll	Pre	1	2	3	4	5	6	7	8	9	10	11	12	13	14	Final
AP	—	—	20	RV	RV	23	RV	RV	—	—	—	RV	RV	—	RV	—
Coaches	—	—	24	RV	RV	23	RV	RV	—	—	—	—	RV	—	RV	—
BCS	Not released								—	—	—	—	—	—	—	Not released
