= 1991 Duke Blue Devils football team =

American college football season

1991 Duke Blue Devils football
- Conference: Atlantic Coast Conference
- Record: 4–6–1 (1–6 ACC)
- Head coach: Barry Wilson (2nd season)
- Offensive coordinator: Eddie Wilson (2nd season)
- Defensive coordinator: Dale Strahm (2nd season)
- MVP: Dave Brown
- Captains: Erwin Sampson; Pete Petroff
- Home stadium: Wallace Wade Stadium

1991 Atlantic Coast Conference football standings
	Conf.					Overall
Team	W		L		T	W		L		T
No. 18 Clemson $	6	–	0	–	1	9	–	2	–	1
No. 24 NC State	5	–	2	–	0	9	–	3	–	0
Georgia Tech	5	–	2	–	0	8	–	5	–	0
Virginia	4	–	2	–	1	8	–	3	–	1
North Carolina	3	–	4	–	0	7	–	4	–	0
Maryland	2	–	5	–	0	2	–	9	–	0
Duke	1	–	6	–	0	4	–	6	–	1
Wake Forest	1	–	6	–	0	3	–	8	–	0
$ – Conference champion; Rankings from AP Poll

The 1991 Duke Blue Devils football team represented Duke University as a member of the Atlantic Coast Conference (ACC) during the 1991 NCAA Division I-A football season. Led by second-year head coach Barry Wilson, the Blue Devils compiled an overall record of 4–6–1 with a mark of 1–6 in conference play, and finished tied for seventh in the ACC. Duke played home games at Wallace Wade Stadium in Durham, North Carolina.

== Schedule ==
Date	Time	Opponent	Site	TV	Result	Attendance	Source
September 7	7:00 p.m.	at South Carolina*	Williams–Brice Stadium; Columbia, SC		T 24–24	71,200	
September 14		Rutgers*	Wallace Wade Stadium; Durham, NC		W 42–22	15,400	
September 21		Colgate*	Wallace Wade Stadium; Durham, NC		W 42–14	20,200	
September 28		at Virginia	Scott Stadium; Charlottesville, VA		L 3–34	43,400	
October 5		Vanderbilt*	Wallace Wade Stadium; Durham, NC		W 17–13	20,600	
October 26		at Maryland	Byrd Stadium; College Park, MD		W 17–13	35,423	
November 2		Georgia Tech^{†}	Wallace Wade Stadium; Durham, NC		L 6–17	38,732	
November 9	1:00 p.m.	at Wake Forest	Groves Stadium; Winston-Salem, NC (rivalry)		L 14–31	15,759	
November 16		No. 24 NC State	Wallace Wade Stadium; Durham, NC (rivalry)		L 31–32	28,975	
November 23		at North Carolina	Kenan Memorial Stadium; Chapel Hill, NC (Victory Bell)		L 14–47	50,500	
November 30	1:30 p.m.	vs. No. 13 Clemson	Tokyo Dome; Tokyo, Japan (Coca-Cola Classic)	ABC	L 21–33	50,000	
*Non-conference game; ^{†}Homecoming; Rankings from AP Poll released prior to the game; All times are in Eastern time
