= 1998 Virginia Cavaliers football team =

American college football season

1998 Virginia Cavaliers football

Peach Bowl, L 33–35 vs. Georgia
- Conference: Atlantic Coast Conference

Ranking
- Coaches: No. 18
- AP: No. 18
- Record: 9–3 (6–2 ACC)
- Head coach: George Welsh (17th season)
- Offensive coordinator: Sparky Woods (2nd season)
- Defensive coordinator: Rick Lantz (8th season)
- Captains: Aaron Brooks; Anthony Poindexter
- Home stadium: Scott Stadium

1998 Atlantic Coast Conference football standings
	Conf.			Overall
Team	W		L	W		L
No. 3 Florida State $+	7	–	1	11	–	2
No. 9 Georgia Tech +	7	–	1	10	–	2
No. 18 Virginia	6	–	2	9	–	3
North Carolina	5	–	3	7	–	5
NC State	5	–	3	7	–	5
Duke	2	–	6	4	–	7
Wake Forest	2	–	6	3	–	8
Clemson	1	–	7	3	–	8
Maryland	1	–	7	3	–	8
$ – BCS representative as conference champion; + – Conference co-champions; Rankings from AP Poll

The 1998 Virginia Cavaliers football team represented the University of Virginia as a member of the Atlantic Coast Conference (ACC) during the 1998 NCAA Division I-A football season. Led by 17th-year head coach George Welsh, the Cavaliers compiled an overall record of 9–3 with a mark of 6–2 in conference play, placing third in the ACC. Virginia was invited to the Peach Bowl, where the Cavaliers lost to Georgia. The team played home games at Scott Stadium in Charlottesville, Virginia.

== Schedule ==
Date	Time	Opponent	Rank	Site	TV	Result	Attendance	Source
September 3	8:00 pm	at No. 25 Auburn*	No. 16	Jordan-Hare Stadium; Auburn, AL	ESPN	W 19–0	78,315	
September 12	12:00 pm	Maryland	No. 12	Scott Stadium; Charlottesville, VA (rivalry)	JPS	W 31–19	42,800	
September 19	3:30 pm	Clemson	No. 10	Scott Stadium; Charlottesville, VA	ABC	W 20–18	42,000	
September 26	12:00 pm	at Duke	No. 11	Wallace Wade Stadium; Durham, NC	JPS	W 24–0	24,380	
October 3	1:00 pm	San Jose State*^{†}	No. 10	Scott Stadium; Charlottesville, VA		W 52–14	41,100	
October 17	3:30 pm	at No. 25 Georgia Tech	No. 7	Bobby Dodd Stadium; Atlanta, GA	ABC	L 38–41	46,018	
October 24	3:30 pm	NC State	No. 16	Scott Stadium; Charlottesville, VA	ABC	W 23–13	45,900	
October 31	3:30 pm	at Wake Forest	No. 15	Groves Stadium; Winston-Salem, NC	ABC	W 38–17	22,718	
November 7	3:30 pm	at No. 6 Florida State	No. 12	Doak Campbell Stadium; Tallahassee, FL (Jefferson–Eppes Trophy)	ABC	L 14–45	81,120	
November 14	3:30 pm	North Carolina	No. 21	Scott Stadium; Charlottesville, VA (South's Oldest Rivalry)	ABC	W 30–13	47,000	
November 28	12:00 pm	at No. 20 Virginia Tech*	No. 16	Lane Stadium; Blacksburg, VA (rivalry)	ESPN	W 36–32	53,207	
December 31	5:00 pm	vs. No. 19 Georgia*	No. 13	Georgia Dome; Atlanta, GA (Peach Bowl)	ESPN	L 33–35	72,876	
*Non-conference game; ^{†}Homecoming; Rankings from AP Poll released prior to the game; All times are in Eastern time

== Rankings ==
Ranking movements Legend: ██ Increase in ranking ██ Decrease in ranking — = Not ranked
	Week															
Poll	Pre	1	2	3	4	5	6	7	8	9	10	11	12	13	14	Final
AP	16	12	10	11	10	9	7	16	15	12	21	18	16	14	13	18
Coaches Poll	19	12	10	10	9	8	6	15	14	12	22	18	15	12	12	18
BCS	Not released								15	15	—	21	17	14	12	Not released

== Personnel ==
1998 Virginia Cavaliers football team roster
Players			Coaches
Offense: Pos. / # / Name / Class; QB / / Aaron Brooks	Defense: Pos. / # / Name / Class; LB / 9 / Shannon Taylor / Jr	Special teams: Pos. / # / Name / Class	Head coach: George Welsh; Coordinators/assistant coaches: Paul Schudel – Offensive line; Legend: (C) Team captain; (S) Suspended; (I) Ineligible; Injured; Redshirt
