= 2006 All-Atlantic Coast Conference football team =

American college football all-star team

The 2006 All-Atlantic Coast Conference football team consists of American football players chosen by various selectors for their All-Atlantic Coast Conference ("ACC") teams for the 2006 college football season. Selectors in 2006 included the Associated Press. AP = Associated Press

== Offensive selections ==
=== Wide receivers ===
- Calvin Johnson, Georgia Tech (AP-1)
- Chansi Stuckey, Clemson (AP-1)
- Darrius Heyward-Bey, Maryland (AP-2)
- Greg Carr, Florida St. (AP-2)

=== Tackles ===
- Steve Vallos, Wake Forest (AP-1)
- Barry Richardson, Clemson (AP-1)
- Duane Brown, Virginia Tech (AP-2)
- James Marten, Boston College (AP-2)

=== Guards ===
- Josh Beekman, Boston College (AP-1)
- Nate Bennett, Clemson (AP-1)
- Leroy Harris, NC State (AP-2)
- Andrew Crummey, Maryland (AP-2)

=== Centers ===
- Steve Justice, Wake Forest (AP-1)
- Dustin Fry, Clemson (AP-2)

=== Tight ends ===
- Greg Olsen, Miami (AP-1)
- Anthony Hill, NC State (AP-2)

=== Quarterbacks ===
- Matt Ryan, Boston College (AP-1)
- Riley Skinner, Wake Forest (AP-2)

=== Running backs ===
- James Davis, Clemson (AP-1)
- Branden Ore, Virginia Tech (AP-1)
- Tashard Choice, Georgia Tech (AP-2)
- C. J. Spiller, Clemson (AP-2)

== Defensive selections ==
=== Defensive ends ===
- Gaines Adams, Clemson (AP-1)
- Calais Campbell, Miami (AP-1)
- Chris Long, Virginia (AP-2)
- Adamm Oliver, Georgia Tech (AP-2)

=== Defensive tackles ===
- Joe Anoai, Georgia Tech (AP-1)
- Tank Tyler, NC State (AP-1)
- Kareem Brown, Miami (AP-2)
- Andre Fluellen, Florida St. (AP-2)
- B. J. Raji, Boston College (AP-2)

=== Linebackers ===
- Vince Hall, Virginia Tech (AP-1)
- Buster Davis, Florida St. (AP-1)
- Jon Abbate, Wake Forest (AP-1)
- Philip Wheeler, Georgia Tech (AP-2)
- Erin Henderson, Maryland (AP-2)
- Xavier Adibi, Virginia Tech (AP-2)

=== Cornerbacks ===
- John Talley, Duke (AP-1)
- Brandon Flowers, Virginia Tech (AP-1)
- Marcus Hamilton, Virginia (AP-2)
- DeJuan Tribble, Boston College (AP-2)

=== Safeties ===
- Josh Gattis, Wake Forest (AP-1)
- Jamal Lewis, Georgia Tech (AP-2)
- Kenny Phillips, Miami (AP-2)
- Brandon Meriweather, Miami (AP-2)

== Special teams ==
=== Placekickers ===
- Sam Swank, Wake Forest (AP-1)
- Brandon Pace, Virginia Tech (AP-2)

=== Punters ===
- Durant Brooks, Georgia Tech (AP-1)
- Adam Podlesh, Maryland (AP-2)

=== Return specialist ===
- Darrell Blackman, NC State (AP-1)
- Eddie Royal, Virginia Tech (AP-2)

== See also ==
- 2006 College Football All-America Team
