= Mike Elkins =

American football player (born 1966)

No. 10
- Position: Quarterback

Personal information
- Born: July 20, 1966 (age 60); Greensboro, North Carolina, U.S.
- Listed height: 6 ft 1 in (1.85 m)
- Listed weight: 221 lb (100 kg)

Career information
- High school: Grimsley (NC)
- College: Wake Forest
- NFL draft: 1989: 2nd round, 32nd overall pick

Career history
- Kansas City Chiefs (1989–1990); Sacramento Surge (1991); Cleveland Browns (1991); Houston Oilers (1992)

Career NFL statistics
- Passing attempts: 2
- Passing completions: 1
- Completion percentage: 50.0%
- TD–INT: 0–1
- Passing yards: 5
- Passer rating: 16.7
- Stats at Pro Football Reference

Michael David Elkins (born July 20, 1966) is an American former professional football player who was a quarterback in the National Football League (NFL) and the World League of American Football (WLAF). He played In the NFL, Elkins played in one game for the Kansas City Chiefs, and then later spent time with the Cleveland Browns and the Houston Oilers, but did not take the field for them. In between his time in the NFL he played one season in the WLAF where he played for the Sacramento Surge.

Elkins father played professional baseball for 10 years. His older brother Rod was drafted to play pro baseball, but deferred to play football at North Carolina, where he was the starting quarterback from 1980-1982 but suffered a career-ending injury against Clemson during his senior year.

== College career ==
Elkins played college football at Wake Forest University. He earned his first start as a freshman in 1985 against Virginia after starting QB Foy White and backup Jamie Harris were injured in back to back games. He earned his first victory a few weeks later against Duke. He led the team to winning records in both his junior and senior years, racking up 7304 career passing yards over 37 games. He finished his career as first in total offense (7,170 yards) and passing yards (7,304), and second in pass completions (609) and touchdown passes (43) in Wake Forest History. He still has the second most wins in program history with 19, trailing only Riley Skinner who had 25.

At the end of the season he was named one of fourteen finalists for the 1988 Davey O'Brien Award which was awarded to Troy Aikman.

He was the starting quarterback for the north in the 1989 Senior Bowl. The four months that he experienced from Senior Bowl week until he was picked by the Chiefs were chronicled in "Maximum Exposure," an article in the May 1, 1989 issue of Sports Illustrated.

== Professional career ==
Despite a poor showing at the NFL combine, Elkins was selected in the second round (32nd overall) of the 1989 NFL draft by the Kansas City Chiefs; the first quarterback taken after Aikman and, controversially, ahead of All-American Rodney Peete. In the summer he was signed to a four-year contract with the Chiefs.

Elkins spent the first 11 games of his rookie season on the injured reserve with a back injury eventually appearing in just one game where he threw just 2 passes and only 1 completion, an interception to Bubba McDowell. That would be his only playing time in the NFL.

In 1991 was loaned to the WLAF by the Chiefs and was a backup and then starting quarterback for the Surge. During his season with the Surge, he threw for 2,068 yards on 312 attempts and 153 completions, with 13 touchdowns and 13 interceptions. Elkins was cut by the Chiefs prior to the 1991 season. He was given a try-out later that season to replace Mark Vlasic but the Chiefs went with Steve Pueller instead.

In 1992 he was signed by the Cleveland Browns and then cut during training camp. He was then signed by the Oilers late in training camp, cut again and then signed 6 weeks later when Warren Moon was injured. He played with the Oilers in the preseason but never took the field during a regular season game. His last game was spent on the sidelines in the playoffs as the Oilers blew the biggest lead in NFL history. Following the season, he decided to walk away from football and took a job with a Cincinnati surgical instruments company.

In 2022, Elkins was inducted into the Wake Forest Sports Hall of Fame.
