= 1998 Wake Forest Demon Deacons football team =

American college football season

1998 Wake Forest Demon Deacons football
- Conference: Atlantic Coast Conference
- Record: 3–8 (2–6 ACC)
- Head coach: Jim Caldwell (6th season)
- Offensive coordinator: Hank Small (2nd season)
- Offensive scheme: Pro-style
- Defensive coordinator: James Bell (2nd season)
- Base defense: 4–3
- Captains: Desmond Clark; Brian Kuklick; Kelvin Moses; Jeffrey Muyres
- Home stadium: Groves Stadium

1998 Atlantic Coast Conference football standings
	Conf.			Overall
Team	W		L	W		L
No. 3 Florida State $+	7	–	1	11	–	2
No. 9 Georgia Tech +	7	–	1	10	–	2
No. 18 Virginia	6	–	2	9	–	3
North Carolina	5	–	3	7	–	5
NC State	5	–	3	7	–	5
Duke	2	–	6	4	–	7
Wake Forest	2	–	6	3	–	8
Clemson	1	–	7	3	–	8
Maryland	1	–	7	3	–	8
$ – BCS representative as conference champion; + – Conference co-champions; Rankings from AP Poll

The 1998 Wake Forest Demon Deacons football team was an American football team that represented Wake Forest University during the 1998 NCAA Division I-A football season. In their sixth season under head coach Jim Caldwell, the Demon Deacons compiled a 3–8 record and finished in a tie for sixth place in the Atlantic Coast Conference.

== Schedule ==
Date	Time	Opponent	Site	TV	Result	Attendance	Source
September 5	1:00 pm	at Air Force*	Falcon Stadium; Colorado Springs, CO	ESPN2	L 0–42	47,972	
September 10	8:00 pm	Navy*	Groves Stadium; Winston-Salem, NC	ESPN	W 26–14	26,032	
September 26	12:00 pm	at Clemson	Memorial Stadium; Clemson, SC	ABC	W 29–19	61,632	
October 3	6:30 pm	Appalachian State*^{†}	Groves Stadium; Winston-Salem, NC		L 27–30 ^{OT}	26,885	
October 10	6:30 pm	Duke	Groves Stadium; Winston-Salem, NC (rivalry)		L 16–19	22,037	
October 17	1:00 pm	at Maryland	Byrd Stadium; College Park, MD		W 20–10	23,419	
October 24	12:00 pm	North Carolina	Groves Stadium; Winston-Salem, NC (rivalry)	JPS	L 31–38	25,841	
October 31	3:30 pm	No. 15 Virginia	Groves Stadium; Winston-Salem, NC	ABC	L 17–38	22,718	
November 7	12:00 pm	at NC State	Carter–Finley Stadium; Raleigh, NC (rivalry)	JPS	L 27–38	51,500	
November 14	5:00 pm	No. 5 Florida State	Groves Stadium; Winston-Salem, NC	ESPN2	L 7–24	19,193	
November 21	1:00 pm	at No. 21 Georgia Tech	Bobby Dodd Stadium; Atlanta, GA		L 35–63	40,110	
*Non-conference game; ^{†}Homecoming; Rankings from AP Poll released prior to the game; All times are in Eastern time

== Team leaders ==
Category	Team Leader	Att/Cth	Yds
Passing	Brian Kuklick	216/396	2,683
Rushing	Morgan Kane	128	454
Receiving	Jammie Deese	68	826
