= 1991 NC State Wolfpack football team =

American college football season

1991 NC State Wolfpack football

Peach Bowl, L 34–37 vs. East Carolina
- Conference: Atlantic Coast Conference

Ranking
- Coaches: No. 25
- AP: No. 24
- Record: 9–3 (5–2 ACC)
- Head coach: Dick Sheridan (6th season)
- Defensive coordinator: Buddy Green (2nd season)
- Home stadium: Carter–Finley Stadium

1991 Atlantic Coast Conference football standings
	Conf.					Overall
Team	W		L		T	W		L		T
No. 18 Clemson $	6	–	0	–	1	9	–	2	–	1
No. 24 NC State	5	–	2	–	0	9	–	3	–	0
Georgia Tech	5	–	2	–	0	8	–	5	–	0
Virginia	4	–	2	–	1	8	–	3	–	1
North Carolina	3	–	4	–	0	7	–	4	–	0
Maryland	2	–	5	–	0	2	–	9	–	0
Duke	1	–	6	–	0	4	–	6	–	1
Wake Forest	1	–	6	–	0	3	–	8	–	0
$ – Conference champion; Rankings from AP Poll

The 1991 NC State Wolfpack football team represented North Carolina State University during the 1991 NCAA Division I-A football season. The team's head coach was Dick Sheridan. NC State has been a member of the Atlantic Coast Conference (ACC) since the league's inception in 1953. The Wolfpack played its home games in 1991 at Carter–Finley Stadium in Raleigh, North Carolina, which has been NC State football's home stadium since 1966.

== Schedule ==
Date	Time	Opponent	Rank	Site	TV	Result	Attendance	Source
September 7	1:00 p.m.	Virginia Tech*		Carter–Finley Stadium; Raleigh, NC		W 7–0	44,907	
September 14		Kent State*		Carter–Finley Stadium; Raleigh, NC		W 47–0	42,914	
September 21	12:00 p.m.	at Wake Forest		Groves Stadium; Winston-Salem, NC (rivalry)	JPS	W 30–3	24,856	
September 28		No. 23 North Carolina		Carter–Finley Stadium; Raleigh, North Carolina (rivalry)	JPS	W 24–7	53,928	
October 5		No. 21 Georgia Tech	No. 19	Carter–Finley Stadium; Raleigh, NC	Raycom	W 24–7	44,105	
October 19		No. 8 (I-AA) Marshall*	No. 11	Carter–Finley Stadium; Raleigh, NC		W 15–14	41,019	
October 26	3:30 p.m.	at No. 19 Clemson	No. 12	Memorial Stadium; Clemson, SC (Textile Bowl)	ABC	L 19–29	79,832	
November 2	4:00 p.m.	at South Carolina*	No. 19	Williams–Brice Stadium; Columbia, SC	ESPN	W 38–21	67,900	
November 9		No. 24 Virginia	No. 18	Carter–Finley Stadium; Raleigh, NC		L 10–42	41,109	
November 16		at Duke	No. 24	Wallace Wade Stadium; Durham, NC (rivalry)		W 32–31	28,975	
November 23		Maryland	No. 22	Carter–Finley Stadium; Raleigh, NC		W 20–17	36,491	
January 1	11:30 a.m.	vs. No. 12 East Carolina*	No. 21	Atlanta–Fulton County Stadium; Atlanta, GA (Peach Bowl)	ESPN	L 34–37	59,322	
*Non-conference game; Rankings from AP Poll released prior to the game; All times are in Eastern time

== Team players drafted into the NFL ==
Player	Position	Round	Pick	NFL club
Mark Thomas	Defensive end	4	89	San Francisco 49ers
Charles Davenport	Wide receiver	4	94	Pittsburgh Steelers
Todd Harrison	Tight end	5	134	Chicago Bears
