= Sam Swank =

American football player (born 1985)

No. 3
- Position: Placekicker

Personal information
- Born: October 5, 1985 (age 41); Lakeland, Florida, U.S.
- Listed height: 6 ft 2 in (1.88 m)
- Listed weight: 201 lb (91 kg)

Career information
- College: Wake Forest
- NFL draft: 2009: undrafted

Career history
- Philadelphia Eagles (2009)*; Cincinnati Bengals (2009)*; New York Giants (2010)*; Hartford Colonials (2010); Jacksonville Jaguars (2011–2012)*
- * Offseason or practice squad member only

Awards and highlights
- First-team All-ACC (2006); Sporting News Freshman All-American (2005)
- Stats at Pro Football Reference

Sam Swank (born October 5, 1985) is an American former football placekicker. After playing college football for Wake Forest, he was signed by the Philadelphia Eagles as an undrafted free agent in 2009.

He was also a member of the Cincinnati Bengals, New York Giants, Hartford Colonials, and Jacksonville Jaguars.

== College career ==
After redshirting as a true freshman in 2004, Swank was a four-year starter at placekicker for Wake Forest and usually handled punting duties, as well. As a sophomore in 2006, Swank was voted ACC Championship Game's Most Valuable Player, scoring all nine points in Wake Forest's 9–6 victory over Georgia Tech. Swank finished his career as the all-time leading scorer at Wake Forest with 337 points, setting school records with 71 field goals and 124 career PATs.

== Professional career ==
=== Philadelphia Eagles ===
Swank was signed as a free agent by the Philadelphia Eagles after being undrafted in the 2009 NFL draft. He was waived on May 27, 2009.

=== Cincinnati Bengals ===
Swank signed with the Cincinnati Bengals on August 24, 2009 after placekicker Shayne Graham suffered a groin injury. He was waived during final cuts on September 5, 2009.

=== New York Giants ===
After spending the 2009 season out of football, Swank was signed to a future contract by the New York Giants on January 6, 2010. He was waived on June 11.

=== Hartford Colonials ===
Swank was signed by the Hartford Colonials of the United Football League on November 8, 2010.

=== Jacksonville Jaguars ===
Swank was signed by the Jacksonville Jaguars on August 9, 2011. He was waived on August 25. He was re-signed following the 2011 season on April 16, 2012. He was waived again on April 27.
