= 1991 Wake Forest Demon Deacons football team =

American college football season

1991 Wake Forest Demon Deacons football
- Conference: Atlantic Coast Conference
- Record: 3–8 (1–6 ACC)
- Head coach: Bill Dooley (5th season)
- Defensive coordinator: Bob Brush (3rd season)
- Captains: Gregg Long; Marvin Mitchell; Anthony Williams
- Home stadium: Groves Stadium

1991 Atlantic Coast Conference football standings
	Conf.					Overall
Team	W		L		T	W		L		T
No. 18 Clemson $	6	–	0	–	1	9	–	2	–	1
No. 24 NC State	5	–	2	–	0	9	–	3	–	0
Georgia Tech	5	–	2	–	0	8	–	5	–	0
Virginia	4	–	2	–	1	8	–	3	–	1
North Carolina	3	–	4	–	0	7	–	4	–	0
Maryland	2	–	5	–	0	2	–	9	–	0
Duke	1	–	6	–	0	4	–	6	–	1
Wake Forest	1	–	6	–	0	3	–	8	–	0
$ – Conference champion; Rankings from AP Poll

The 1991 Wake Forest Demon Deacons football team was an American football team that represented Wake Forest University during the 1991 NCAA Division I-A football season. In their fifth season under head coach Bill Dooley, the Demon Deacons compiled a 3–8 record and finished in last place in the Atlantic Coast Conference.

== Schedule ==
Date	Time	Opponent	Site	TV	Result	Attendance	Source
September 14	7:00 pm	Western Carolina*	Groves Stadium; Winston-Salem, NC		W 40–24	22,352	
September 21	12:00 pm	NC State	Groves Stadium; Winston-Salem, NC (rivalry)	JPS	L 3–30	24,856	
September 28	1:00 pm	at Northwestern	Dyche Stadium; Evanston, IL		L 14–41	25,147	
October 5	6:00 pm	Appalachian State*	Groves Stadium; Winston-Salem, NC		L 3–17	28,234	
October 12	1:30 pm	at North Carolina	Kenan Memorial Stadium; Chapel Hill, NC (rivalry)		L 10–24	49,200	
October 19	1:00 pm	Maryland	Groves Stadium; Winston-Salem, NC		L 22–23	17,342	
October 26	4:00 pm	at Virginia	Scott Stadium; Charlottesville, VA		L 7–48	41,900	
November 2	1:00 pm	at No. 16 Clemson	Memorial Stadium; Clemson, SC		L 10–28	68,955	
November 9	1:00 pm	Duke	Groves Stadium; Winston-Salem, NC (rivalry)		W 31–14	15,759	
November 16	12:00 pm	at Georgia Tech	Bobby Dodd Stadium; Atlanta, GA	JPS	L 3–27	38,124	
November 23	1:30 pm	at Navy*	Navy–Marine Corps Memorial Stadium; Annapolis, MD		W 52–24	22,276	
*Non-conference game; Rankings from AP Poll released prior to the game; All times are in Eastern time

== Team leaders ==
Category	Team Leader	Att/Cth	Yds
Passing	Keith West	153/296	1,969
Rushing	Anthony Williams	139	523
Receiving	John Henry Mills	51	559
