= Kenny Duckett =

American football player (1959–1998)

No. 83, 86
- Position: Wide receiver

Personal information
- Born: October 1, 1959; Winston-Salem, North Carolina, U.S.
- Died: April 15, 1998 (aged 38); Winston-Salem, North Carolina, U.S.
- Listed height: 6 ft 0 in (1.83 m)
- Listed weight: 184 lb (83 kg)

Career information
- High school: R. J. Reynolds (Winston-Salem, North Carolina)
- College: Wake Forest
- NFL draft: 1982: 3rd round, 68th overall pick

Career history
- New Orleans Saints (1982–1985); Dallas Cowboys (1985)

Awards and highlights
- 2× All-ACC (1980, 1981); Nils V. "Swede" Nelson Award (1981); Brian Piccolo Award (1982)

Career NFL statistics
- Receptions: 34
- Receiving yards: 503
- Touchdowns: 4
- Stats at Pro Football Reference

Kenneth Wayne Duckett (October 1, 1959 – April 15, 1998) was an American professional football player who was a wide receiver in the National Football League (NFL) for the New Orleans Saints and Dallas Cowboys. He played college football at Wake Forest University.

== Early life ==
Duckett attended Richard J. Reynolds High School, where he was diagnosed with diabetes during tenth grade. He continued to play football despite warnings from his doctors, while having problems maintaining weight and his illness affecting his healing capacity.

As a senior running back, he rushed for over 900 yards and scored 20 touchdowns. He received All-state, All-American, and Winston-Salem Player of the Year honors. He finished his high school career with over 2,000 total yards and 20 touchdowns.

He also practiced baseball and basketball. As a senior in baseball, he received All-conference, All-American, Player of the Year honors and was selected by the Los Angeles Dodgers.

== College career ==
Duckett accepted a football scholarship from Wake Forest University. He broke his ankle returning a kickoff in the third game of his true freshman season and was redshirted.

As a redshirt freshman, he was switched from running back to wide receiver, but again broke the same ankle the week before the start of the season and missed 5 weeks. The injury affected his speed and he had to work to regain his previous form. He became the team's kickoff returner, making 25 returns for 495 yards (19.8-yard avg.). He also had 2 receptions for 16 yards.

As a sophomore in 1979, he became a starter at wide receiver, posting 19 receptions (fifth on the team) for 370 yards (second on the team), a 19.5-yard average and 16 kickoff returns for 339 yards (21.2-yard avg.).

As a junior he had a breakout season, registering 50 receptions (second in the ACC), 656 receiving yards (third in the ACC) and 12 receiving touchdowns (School and ACC record, ranked third nationally). He also had 11 kickoff returns for 182 yards (16-yard avg.).

As a senior, he was limited with a knee sprain injury and missed 3 games. He recorded 37 receptions (second on the team) for 457 yards (second on the team), 7 touchdowns (led the team) and 3 kickoff returns for 57 yards (19-yard avg.).

He finished his college career with 108 receptions (third in school history), 1,507 receiving yards (second in school history), 19 receiving touchdowns, 62 kick-offs returns for 1,251 yards and 27 punt returns for 212 yards. At the time he set school records for most kickoff returns (62), most touchdown receptions in a season (12) and most career touchdown receptions (19).

== Professional career ==
=== New Orleans Saints ===
Duckett was selected by the New Orleans Saints in the third round (68th overall) of the 1982 NFL draft, after dropping because of his diabetes condition. He was mainly used as a kickoff returner and backup wide receiver. He missed 2 games with shoulder and finger injuries. As a rookie, he had 12 catches for 196 yards and averaged 16.3 yards per reception. He had 4 receptions for 71 yards against the Tampa Bay Buccaneers.

In 1983, he tallied 19 receptions for 283 yards and averaged 21.8-yards on 33 kickoff returns. He missed 2 games with a foot injury. He didn't record any receptions in the last 7 contests of the season, after being limited with injuries. He had 5 receptions for 53 yards, one receiving touchdown and a 61-yard kickoff return, in his only start against the Chicago Bears.

In 1984, he missed the last 5 games of the season with a diabetic condition. He appeared in 11 games, finishing with 3 receptions for 24 yards and a 20-yard average on 29 kickoff returns.

On August 27, 1985, he was placed on injured reserve list with a hand injury and was later waived on October 15. He left the team with 64 kickoff returns for 1,338 yards (20.9-yard avg.), 503 receiving yards and 4 receiving touchdowns.

=== Dallas Cowboys ===
On December 5, 1985, he was signed as a free agent by the Dallas Cowboys, to replace an injured Robert Lavette and be the team's kickoff returner. His best game came in the playoffs against the Los Angeles Rams, when he averaged 24.8-yards on 4 kickoff returns. He was released on August 18, 1986.

== Personal life ==
Duckett's older brother, Rick, was a college basketball coach.

Duckett contributed extensively to the Forsyth Chapter of the American Diabetes Association. In 1993, he started suffering from kidney failure as a result of his diabetes condition. On April 15, 1998, he was found dead at his home at the age of 38, due to renal failure.
