= Chris Barclay =

American football player and coach (born 1983)

Louisville Cardinals
- Title: Running backs coach

Personal information
- Born: October 15, 1983 (age 43); Louisville, Kentucky, U.S.
- Listed height: 5 ft 10 in (1.78 m)
- Listed weight: 180 lb (82 kg)

Career information
- High school: Louisville (KY) Male
- College: Wake Forest
- NFL draft: 2006: undrafted

Career history

Playing
- Cleveland Browns (2006–2007); → Berlin Thunder (2007); Tennessee Titans (2007); New Orleans Saints (2007); Atlanta Falcons (2008)*; New York Sentinels (2009)
- * Offseason or practice squad member only

Coaching
- Wake Forest (2011) Graduate assistant; William & Mary (2012–2013) Running backs coach; Marshall (2014–2015) Running backs coach; Western Kentucky (2016) Running backs coach; Purdue (2017–2022) Running backs coach; Louisville (2023–present) Running backs coach

Awards and highlights
- ACC Player of the Year (2005); ACC Offensive Player of the Year (2005); 2× First-team All-ACC (2004, 2005); Second-team All-ACC (2003)

Career NFL statistics
- Rushing attempts: 1
- Rushing yards: 3
- Receptions: 2
- Receiving yards: 13
- Return yards: 436
- Stats at Pro Football Reference

Chris Barclay (born October 15, 1983) is an American football coach and former running back who is the running backs coach for the Louisville Cardinals. He played college football at Wake Forest. He was signed by the Cleveland Browns as an undrafted free agent in 2006 and last played for the New York Sentinels.

Barclay has also been a member of the Berlin Thunder, Tennessee Titans, New Orleans Saints, and Atlanta Falcons.

== College career ==
Barclay capped a standout collegiate career at Wake Forest in 2005, when he was named as the Atlantic Coast Conference 2005 Player of the Year and Offensive Player of the Year. He graduated as the school's career leader in seven major categories, including rushing yards (4,032), scoring (240 points), rushing touchdowns (40), total touchdowns (40), all-purpose yards (4,930), 200-yard rushing games (3) and 1,000 yard rushing seasons (3).

== Professional career ==
=== Cleveland Browns ===
Barclay was originally signed by the Browns as an undrafted free agent out of Wake Forest. However, Barclay was waived by the team at the end of training camp. Barclay was then signed to the Browns' practice squad and subsequently to the team's active roster.

Following the 2006 season, Barclay was allocated to NFL Europa where he became the starting running back for the Berlin Thunder. He was the Week 4 Special Teams player of the week after returning 5 kicks for 180 yards, including a 99-yard touchdown.

In his first action with the Browns during the 2007 preseason, he returned a kick-off 88 yards for the game-winning touchdown against the Kansas City Chiefs. He began the regular season on the team's practice squad, where he spent the first 11 weeks of the season.

=== Tennessee Titans ===
On November 22, 2007, Barclay was signed off the Cleveland Browns practice squad onto the active roster of the Tennessee Titans to replace Chris Henry, who had been suspended.

=== New Orleans Saints ===
On December 24, 2007, Barclay was claimed by the New Orleans Saints off waivers from the Tennessee Titans. He suffered a sprain knee on July 29, 2008, in training camp and was subsequently placed on injured reserve. He was later released with an injury settlement.

=== Atlanta Falcons ===
Barclay was signed to the Atlanta Falcons practice squad on October 14, 2008.

=== New York Sentinels ===
Barclay was signed by the New York Sentinels of the United Football League on September 9, 2009.

== Coaching career ==
After spending the 2011 season as a graduate assistant at Wake Forest, Barclay was hired as the running backs coach at William & Mary for the 2012 season. In March 2014, Barclay accepted a job at the same position at Marshall.
