= Mike Mooney (American football) =

American football player (1969–2007)

No. 73
- Position: Offensive tackle

Personal information
- Born: May 31, 1969; Baltimore, Maryland, U.S.
- Died: March 2, 2007 (aged 37); Westminster, California, U.S.
- Listed height: 6 ft 6 in (1.98 m)
- Listed weight: 320 lb (145 kg)

Career information
- High school: South Carroll (Sykesville, Maryland)
- College: Georgia Tech
- NFL draft: 1992: 4th round, 108th overall pick

Career history
- Houston Oilers (1992)*; San Diego Chargers (1992–1993)
- * Offseason or practice squad member only

Awards and highlights
- National champion (1990); First-team All-ACC (1991)

Career NFL statistics
- Games played: 1
- Stats at Pro Football Reference

Michael Paul Mooney (May 31, 1969 – March 2, 2007) was an American professional football player for the San Diego Chargers and Houston Oilers of the National Football League (NFL). He was selected by the Oilers in the fourth round of the 1992 NFL draft with the 108th overall pick. Mooney, who played collegiately at Georgia Tech and appeared in one game for the Chargers as an offensive tackle.
