= Riley Skinner =

American football player (born 1986)

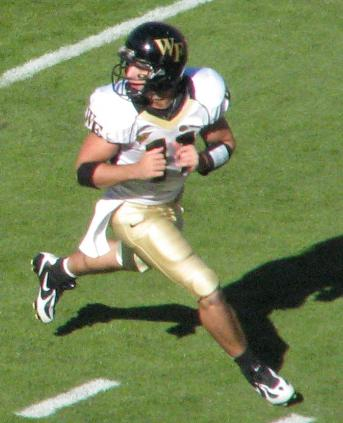
- Skinner in 2007

No. 11
- Position: Quarterback

Personal information
- Born: October 21, 1986 (age 40); Jacksonville, Florida, U.S.
- Listed height: 6 ft 0 in (1.83 m)
- Listed weight: 210 lb (95 kg)

Career information
- High school: Bolles (Jacksonville)
- College: Wake Forest
- NFL draft: 2010: undrafted

Career history
- New York Giants (2010)*
- * Offseason or practice squad member only

Awards and highlights
- ACC Rookie of the Year (2006); Second-team All-ACC (2006)

Riley Skinner (born October 21, 1986) is an American former professional football player who was a quarterback in the National Football League (NFL). He played college football for the Wake Forest Demon Deacons and was signed by the New York Giants as an undrafted free agent in 2010. Skinner is currently captain of a golf team representing San Jose Country Club for the annual Ross Cup Championship.

== College career ==
Skinner played high school football and basketball for The Bolles School in Jacksonville, Florida. Skinner stepped in for the injured Wake Forest University quarterback Ben Mauk after Mauk injured his arm in the first game of the 2006 season against Syracuse. Skinner proceeded to lead the Demon Deacons to a 10–2 regular season and the championship of the Atlantic Division of the Atlantic Coast Conference. He won second-team All-Conference honors as a redshirt freshman. Skinner and the Demon Deacons won the 2006 ACC Championship game against the Georgia Tech Yellow Jackets 9–6, giving the program its first conference championship since 1970. Skinner also played well in the Orange Bowl, but the Deacons fell to Louisville 24–13. Skinner threw for 2,051 yards and nine touchdowns, and recorded a 19-yard touchdown reception from wide receiver Nate Morton.

Skinner was named the 2006 ACC Rookie of the Year after leading the conference in passing efficiency, and he started 12 games for Wake Forest during the 2007 season, setting an ACC record for completion percentage in a season. In the 2009 season he broke the school record for touchdowns in a career vs North Carolina State with 45 touchdowns. The previous record was 44 that was held by former Wake Forest quarterbacks Brian Kuklick and Gary Schofield. Skinner threw for three touchdowns in a game against NC State. He broke the school record for completions in a career with 677 against Stanford, passing Kuklick. In 2009, he became the second ACC Quarterback to throw for more than 2,000 yards in each of his four seasons.

=== Statistics ===
Season	GP	QB rating	Attempts	Completions	Comp%	Yards	Touchdowns	Int
2006	14	139.6	260	171	65.8%	2,051	9	5
2007	11	133.4	326	236	72.4%	2,204	12	13
2008	13	126.2	363	232	63.9%	2,347	13	7
2009	12	147.0	400	264	66%	3,818	25	12
Total	50	546.2	1,349	903	66.9%	10,420	59	37

== Professional career ==
=== New York Giants ===
Skinner was signed by the New York Giants as an undrafted free agent following the 2010 NFL draft. He was waived on June 25, 2010, and his agent, Mark Slough, announced that Skinner had decided to retire on August 18.

== Broadcasting career ==
After getting cut by the Giants, his only NFL opportunity, Skinner became a college football analyst for the ACC Network. He is also a weekly college football analyst for the award-winning radio broadcast "The Drill" every Thursday on 1010xl in Jacksonville, Florida.
