= Michael Campanaro =

American football player (born 1991)

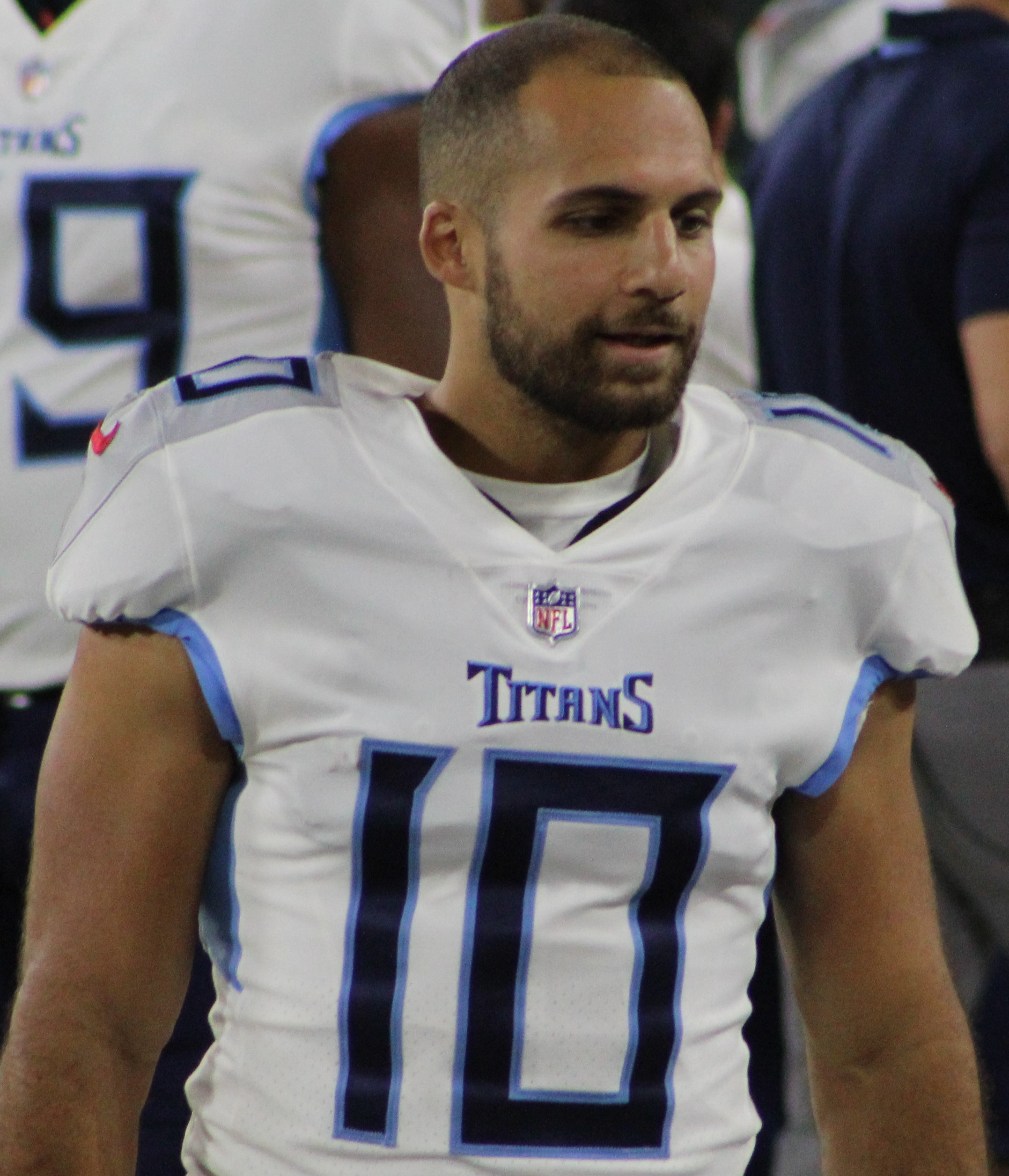
- Campanaro with the Tennessee Titans in 2018

No. 15, 12, 10
- Position: Wide receiver

Personal information
- Born: January 25, 1991 (age 35); Silver Spring, Maryland, U.S.
- Listed height: 5 ft 9 in (1.75 m)
- Listed weight: 191 lb (87 kg)

Career information
- High school: River Hill (Clarksville, Maryland)
- College: Wake Forest (2009–2013)
- NFL draft: 2014: 7th round, 218th overall pick

Career history
- Baltimore Ravens (2014–2017); Tennessee Titans (2018)

Awards and highlights
- 2× Second-team All-ACC (2012, 2013)

Career NFL statistics
- Receptions: 31
- Receiving yards: 310
- Rushing attempts: 10
- Rushing yards: 131
- Return yards: 658
- Total touchdowns: 4
- Stats at Pro Football Reference

Michael Campanaro (born January 25, 1991), is an American former professional football player who was a wide receiver in the National Football League (NFL). He played college football for the Wake Forest Demon Deacons and was selected by the Baltimore Ravens in the seventh round of the 2014 NFL draft.

== Early life ==
Campanaro attended and played high school football at River Hill High School.

== College career ==
Campanaro attended and played college football at Wake Forest University from 2010–2013. He was redshirted during his first season on campus. In his redshirt freshman season, he served primarily as a return specialist. Campanaro earned a starting position at wide receiver his sophomore year and recorded 833 yards off 73 receptions. Alongside Chris Givens, the two teamed up to be the most productive receiving tandem in Wake Forest history. However, injuries sidelined Campanaro for multiple games during his junior and senior seasons. He managed to finish sixth in ACC history for career receptions, hauling in 229 passes during his tenure at Wake Forest. He totaled 229 receptions for 2,506 yards and 14 touchdowns in his college football career.

== Professional career ==
Pre-draft measurables
Height	Weight	Arm length	Hand span	40-yard dash	10-yard split	20-yard split	20-yard shuttle	Three-cone drill	Vertical jump	Broad jump	Bench press
5 ft 9 3/8 in (1.76 m)	192 lb (87 kg)	30 in (0.76 m)	9 3/4 in (0.25 m)	4.46 s	1.56 s	2.62 s	4.01 s	6.77 s	39 in (0.99 m)	10 ft 2 in (3.10 m)	20 reps
All values are from NFL Combine

=== Baltimore Ravens ===
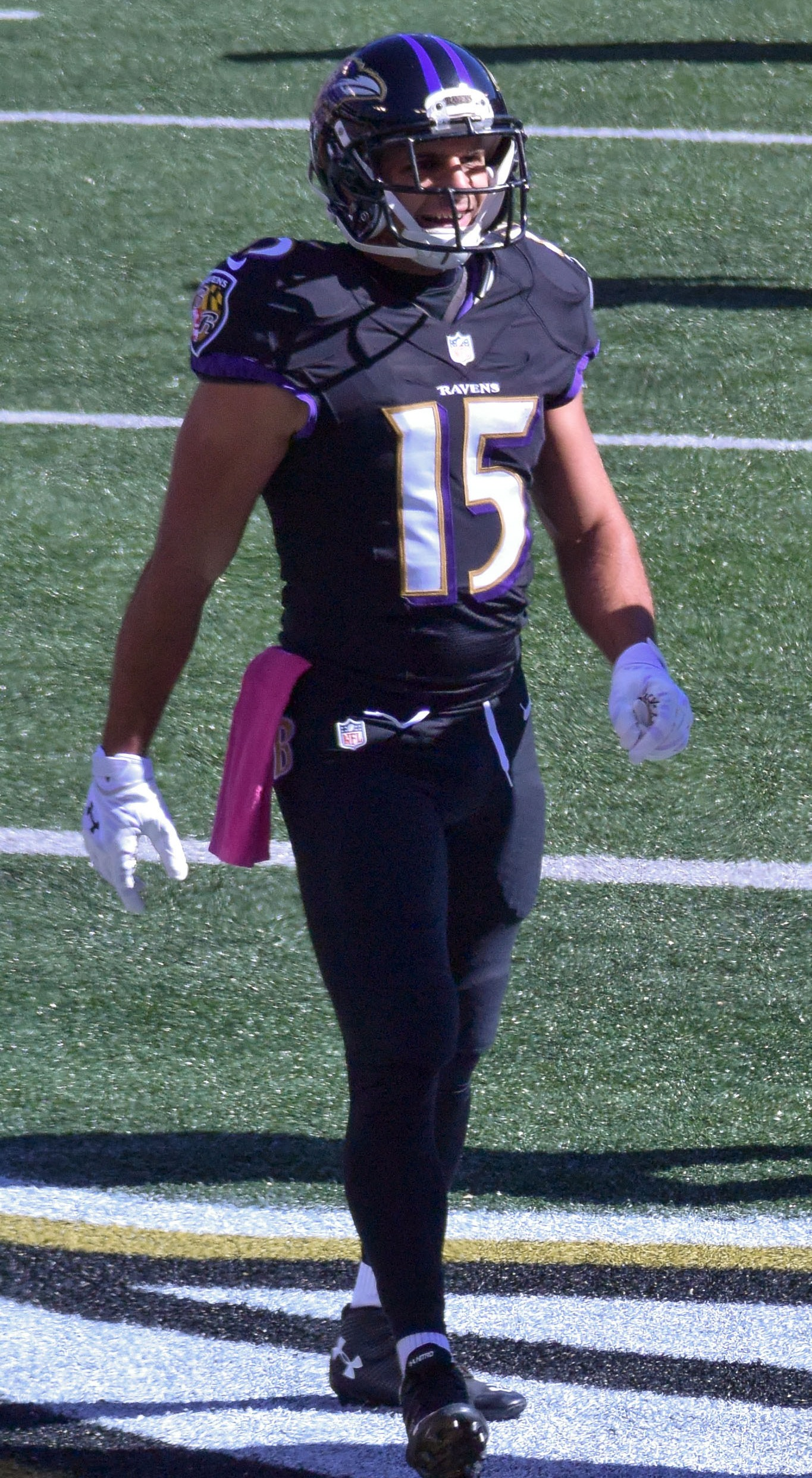
Campanaro with the Baltimore Ravens in 2014

Campanaro was selected by the Baltimore Ravens in the seventh round (218th overall) of the 2014 NFL draft. He scored his first career touchdown while simultaneously recording his first career reception in Week 6 against the Tampa Bay Buccaneers on October 12, 2014. He proved to be useful in the Ravens offense until injuring his hamstring in Week 8 against the Cincinnati Bengals. He finished his rookie season with seven receptions for 102 receiving yards and a receiving touchdown.

On October 1, 2015, Campanaro provided the first score of the game for the Ravens with a nine-yard rushing touchdown on an end-around play against Pittsburgh. He was placed on injured reserve on October 3 due to a herniated disc. He finished the 2015 season with five receptions for 35 receiving yards to go along with two rushes for 17 rushing yards and a rushing touchdown in four games.

On September 3, 2016, Campanaro was placed on injured reserve. On September 12, 2016, he was released from injured reserve.

Campanaro was signed to the Ravens' practice squad on November 7, 2016. He was promoted to the active roster on December 14, 2016. In the 2016 season, he finished with three receptions for 106 receiving yards in three games.

On April 6, 2017, Campanaro signed a one-year contract with the Ravens. In Week 6 of the 2017 season, against the Chicago Bears, he recorded a 77-yard punt return touchdown late in the fourth quarter to put the game in position to go to overtime, although the Ravens would ultimately lose 27–24. Over two months later, Campanaro would catch his first touchdown pass in over three years in a 23–16 win over the Indianapolis Colts. In 13 games in the 2017 season, he finished with 19 receptions for 173 receiving yards and one receiving touchdown to go along with five carries for 42 rushing yards.

=== Tennessee Titans ===
On April 10, 2018, Campanaro signed a one-year contract with the Tennessee Titans. He was placed on injured reserve on August 26. Campanaro was released by the Titans on October 23.

=== Statistics ===
Source: NFL.com

Year	Team	Games		Receiving					Rushing					Fumbles	
Year	Team	GP	GS	Rec	Yds	Avg	Lng	TD	Att	Yds	Avg	Lng	TD	FUM	Lost
Regular season
2014	BAL	4	0	7	102	14.6	19	1	0	0	0.0	0	0	0	0
2015	BAL	4	0	5	35	7.0	11	0	2	17	8.5	9	1	0	0
2016	BAL	3	0	0	0	0	0	0	3	73	24.0	39	0	0	0
2017	BAL	13	0	19	173	9.1	18	1	5	42	8.4	19	0	4	0
Total		24	0	19	310	10.0	19	2	10	131	13.1	39	1	4	0
Postseason
2014	BAL	2	0	4	39	9.8	16	0	1	0	0.0	0	0	0	0
Total		2	0	4	39	9.8	16	0	1	0	0.0	0	0	0	0
