= Brian Kuklick =

American football player (born 1976)

No. 14
- Position: Quarterback

Personal information
- Born: May 23, 1976 (age 50); Hatboro, Pennsylvania, U.S.
- Listed height: 6 ft 3 in (1.91 m)
- Listed weight: 205 lb (93 kg)

Career information
- High school: Hatboro-Horsham (PA)
- College: Wake Forest
- NFL draft: 1999: undrafted

Career history
- Dallas Cowboys (1999)*; Orlando Rage (2001)
- * Offseason or practice squad member only

Awards and highlights
- Second-team All-ACC (1997)

Brian Kuklick (born May 23, 1976) is an American former quarterback for the Orlando Rage of the XFL.

== Early life and education ==
A star top-ranked football player in Pennsylvania, Kuklick became a two-sport athlete at Wake Forest University. In addition to playing as a quarterback, Kuklick played as a member of the Wake Forest Demon Deacons baseball team as a freshman. He drafted in the 5th round by the New York Mets in the June 1994 free agent draft. Kuklick graduated with a Bachelor of Arts in communications.

In 1994, Kuklick made his first collegiate start against in the season finale against Georgia Tech. He led the Demon Deacons to a 20–13 victory where he completed 6-of-15 passes for 59 yards. In 1995, Kuklick lost the starting quarterback competition to Rusty LaRue, but replaced LaRue in the season opener against Appalachian State. He was named the starter the following week against Tulane, but sustained a broken right arm that ended his season. In 1996, Kucklick led the Atlantic Coast Conference in passes completed, passes attempted and passing yards. In 1997, he started the first nine games of the season before breaking his leg against Clemson. On the season, he threw for a career high 15 touchdowns and was named second-team all conference. In 1998, Kuklick threw for a career high 2,683 yards while the Demon Deacons finished with a 3–8 record. At the conclusion of the season he appeared in the Blue–Gray Football Classic and Gridiron Classic. In the Gridiron Classic, Kuklick sustained a concussion in the second half and was replaced by Graham Leigh.

Football statistics

| Season | Team | Games | | | Passing | | | | | | | | Rushing | | | |
| Season | Team | GP | GS | Record | Cmp | Att | Pct | Yds | Avg | TD | Int | Rtg | Att | Yds | Avg | TD |
|---|---|---|---|---|---|---|---|---|---|---|---|---|---|---|---|---|
| 1994 | Wake Forest | 7 | 1 | 1–0 | 39 | 98 | 39.8 | 393 | 4.0 | 2 | 8 | 63.9 | 23 | 48 | 2.1 | 1 |
| 1995 | Wake Forest | 2 | 1 | 0–1 | 15 | 28 | 53.6 | 235 | 8.4 | 2 | 0 | 147.6 | 6 | 2 | 0.3 | 0 |
| 1996 | Wake Forest | 11 | 11 | 3–8 | 205 | 396 | 51.8 | 2,526 | 6.4 | 11 | 13 | 108.0 | 80 | -72 | -0.9 | 1 |
| 1997 | Wake Forest | 9 | 9 | 4–5 | 190 | 312 | 60.9 | 2,180 | 7.0 | 15 | 11 | 128.4 | 51 | -48 | -0.9 | 1 |
| 1998 | Wake Forest | 11 | 11 | 3–8 | 216 | 396 | 54.5 | 2,683 | 6.8 | 14 | 17 | 114.5 | 78 | -109 | -1.4 | 3 |
| Career | | 40 | 33 | 11–22 | 665 | 1,230 | 54.1 | 8,017 | 6.5 | 44 | 49 | 112.7 | 238 | -179 | -0.8 | 6 |

== Career ==
In 1999, Kuklick signed and attended training camp with the Dallas Cowboys as an undrafted free agent. He also spent time with the Oakland Raiders. He signed with the New England Patriots on February 29, 2000, before being released on May 4, 2000.

Kuklick became a member of the Orlando Rage during the XFL's debut season. He was selected in the 24 round of the 2001 XFL draft.

In week 5 against the Memphis Maniax, Kuklick replaced starting quarterback Jeff Brohm who sustained an injury. In the third quarter he threw an XFL record 81-yard touchdown pass to Dialleo Burks. In the fourth quarter he led the Rage on a go ahead field goal drive that secured the win. In week 7 against the Los Angeles Xtreme, Brohm was lost for the season due to an injury. Kuklick came on in relief once again and completed 17-of-23 passes for 228 yards but threw three interceptions. The following week against New York/New Jersey Hitmen, Kuklick made his first professional start. He led the Rage to a 17–12 victory over the Hitmen. Kuklick completed 12-of-24 passes for 128 with a touchdown and interception. During the regular season he appeared in eight games (3 starts) with a 2–1 record as the starting quarterback. He finished sixth in the league with 994 passing yards, but led the league with ten interceptions. Kuklick started the semi-final game against San Francisco Demons, but was replaced by Jim Arellanes in fourth quarter.

The league was a financial failure, and the XFL ceased operations in May 2001. After retiring from football, Kuklick became an account manager at Ikon Office Solutions in Charlotte, North Carolina.

== Career statistics ==
Regular season

| Year | Team | Games | | | Passing | | | | | | | | | Rushing | | | | |
| Year | Team | GP | GS | Record | Cmp | Att | Pct | Yds | Y/A | Lng | TD | Int | Rtg | Att | Yds | Y/A | Lng | TD |
|---|---|---|---|---|---|---|---|---|---|---|---|---|---|---|---|---|---|---|
| 2001 | ORL | 8 | 3 | 2–1 | 68 | 122 | 55.7 | 994 | 8.1 | 81 | 6 | 10 | 64.7 | 17 | 31 | 1.8 | 9 | 1 |
| Career | | 8 | 3 | 2–1 | 68 | 122 | 55.7 | 994 | 8.1 | 81 | 6 | 10 | 64.7 | 17 | 31 | 1.8 | 9 | 1 |

Postseason

| Year | Team | Games | | | Passing | | | | | | | | | Rushing | | | | |
| Year | Team | GP | GS | Record | Cmp | Att | Pct | Yds | Y/A | Lng | TD | Int | Rtg | Att | Yds | Y/A | Lng | TD |
|---|---|---|---|---|---|---|---|---|---|---|---|---|---|---|---|---|---|---|
| 2001 | ORL | 1 | 1 | 0–1 | 5 | 16 | 31.2 | 46 | 2.9 | 19 | 0 | 1 | 14.5 | 1 | -2 | -2.0 | -2 | 0 |
