= Jammie Deese =

American football player and coach (born 1977)

Profile
- Position: Wide receiver

Personal information
- Born: May 9, 1977 (age 49)

Career information
- College: Wake Forest
- NFL draft: 2000: undrafted

Career history

Playing
- Washington Redskins (2000)*; Carolina Cobras (2001); Fayetteville Guard (2006–2009)
- * Offseason or practice squad member only

Coaching
- UNC Pembroke (2007–2008) Running backs/tight ends coach; UNC Pembroke (2009) Runnings back coach; UNC Pembroke (2010–2012) Wide receivers coach; UNC Pembroke (2013) Offensive coordinator/wide receivers coach; West Florida (2016–2018) Offensive coordinator; Forest Hills HS (2020–2026) Head coach; Charlotte Christian School (2026-Present) Head Coach

Jammie Deese (born May 10, 1977) is an American football coach and former American football wide receiver. He played college football for the Wake Forest Demon Deacons, then played professionally for the Carolina Cobras in the Arena Football League and Fayetteville Guard in the National Indoor Football League. From 2016 to 2019, he was the offensive coordinator for the college football program at West Florida. Deese left UWF in July 2019.

From 2020-2026 , he was the head coach at Forest Hills High School in Marshville, North Carolina, until taking the Head Coaching job at Charlotte Christian School in Charlotte, North Carolina on April 27, 2026.
