= Duke Blue Devils football statistical leaders =

The Duke Blue Devils football statistical leaders are individual statistical leaders of the Duke Blue Devils football program in various categories, including passing, rushing, receiving, total offense, defensive stats, and kicking. Within those areas, the lists identify single-game, single-season, and career leaders. The Blue Devils represent Duke University in the NCAA Division I FBS Atlantic Coast Conference.

Although Duke began competing in intercollegiate football in 1888, the school's official record book considers the generally does not have many entries from before the 1930s, as records from before this year are often incomplete and inconsistent.

These lists are dominated by more recent players for several reasons:

- Since the 1930s, seasons have increased from 10 games to 11 and then 12 games in length.
- The NCAA didn't allow freshmen to play varsity football until 1972 (with the exception of the World War II years), allowing players to have four-year careers.
- The NCAA only began counting bowl games toward single-season and career statistics in 2002. The Blue Devils have played in 10 bowl games since that time. This means almost all of the most recent Duke players have had at least one extra game each season in which to accumulate statistics.
- The Blue Devils played in the ACC Championship Game in 2013 and 2025, giving players in those seasons yet another game in which to accumulate statistics.
- Since 2018, players have been allowed to participate in as many as four games in a redshirt season; previously, playing in even one game "burned" the redshirt. Since 2024, postseason games have not counted against the four-game limit. These changes to redshirt rules have given very recent players several extra games to accumulate statistics.
- Due to COVID-19 disruptions, the NCAA did not count the 2020 season against the eligibility of any football player, giving all players active in that season five years of eligibility instead of the normal four.

These lists are updated through Week 12 of the 2026 season. Active players are listed in bold.

== Passing ==
=== Passing yards ===
Career
Rk	Player	Yards	Years
1	Thaddeus Lewis	10,065	2006 2007 2008 2009
2	Ben Bennett	9,614	1980 1981 1982 1983
3	Sean Renfree	9,465	2009 2010 2011 2012
4	Spence Fischer	9,019	1992 1993 1994 1995
5	Daniel Jones	8,201	2016 2017 2018
6	Steve Slayden	8,004	1984 1985 1986 1987
7	Leo Hart	6,116	1968 1969 1970
8	Anthony Boone	5,789	2011 2012 2013 2014
9	Dave Brown	5,717	1989 1990 1991
10	Anthony Dilweg	4,557	1985 1986 1987 1988

Single season
Rk	Player	Yards	Year
1	Darian Mensah	3,973	2025
2	Anthony Dilweg	3,824	1988
3	Thaddeus Lewis	3,330	2009
4	Sean Renfree	3,131	2010
5	Sean Renfree	3,113	2012
6	Ben Bennett	3,086	1983
7	Ben Bennett	3,033	1982
8	Riley Leonard	2,967	2022
9	Maalik Murphy	2,933	2024
10	Steve Slayden	2,924	1987

Single game
Rk	Player	Yards	Year	Opponent
1	Dave Brown	479	1989	North Carolina
2	Anthony Dilweg	475	1988	Wake Forest
3	Ben Bennett	469	1980	Wake Forest
4	Thaddeus Lewis	459	2009	NC State
5	Steve Slayden	458	1987	NC State
6	Dave Brown	444	1989	Wake Forest
7	Ben Bennett	442	1983	NC State
8	Sean Renfree	432	2012	Miami
9	Thaddeus Lewis	428	2007	Navy
10	Anthony Boone	427	2013	Texas A&M

=== Passing touchdowns ===
Career
Rk	Player	TDs	Years
1	Thaddeus Lewis	67	2006 2007 2008 2009
2	Ben Bennett	55	1980 1981 1982 1983
3	Daniel Jones	52	2016 2017 2018
4	Sean Renfree	51	2009 2010 2011 2012
5	Spence Fischer	48	1992 1993 1994 1995
	Steve Slayden	48	1984 1985 1986 1987
7	Dave Brown	42	1989 1990 1991
8	Anthony Boone	38	2011 2012 2013 2014
9	Darian Mensah	34	2025
10	Anthony Dilweg	27	1985 1986 1987 1988

Single season
Rk	Player	TDs	Year
1	Darian Mensah	34	2025
2	Maalik Murphy	26	2024
3	Anthony Dilweg	24	1988
4	Daniel Jones	22	2018
5	Thaddeus Lewis	21	2007
6	Ben Bennett	20	1982
	Steve Slayden	20	1987
	Dave Brown	20	1991
	Thaddeus Lewis	20	2009
	Riley Leonard	20	2022

Single game
Rk	Player	TDs	Year	Opponent
1	Steve Slayden	6	1987	Georgia Tech
2	Thaddeus Lewis	5	2009	NC State
	Daniel Jones	5	2018	Temple (Independence Bowl)
4	26 times by 17 players	4	Most recent: **Darian Mensah**, 2025 vs. Arizona State	

== Rushing ==
=== Rushing yards ===
Career
Rk	Player	Yards	Years
1	Chris Douglas	3,122	2000 2001 2002 2003
2	Steve Jones	2,951	1970 1971 1972
3	Randy Cuthbert	2,790	1988 1989 1990 1991 1992
4	**Nate Sheppard**	2,568	2025 2026
5	Mataeo Durant	2,562	2018 2019 2020 2021
6	Shaun Wilson	2,463	2014 2015 2016 2017
7	Mike Grayson	2,441	1980 1981 1982 1983
8	Deon Jackson	2,267	2017 2018 2019 2020
9	Tony Benjamin	2,251	1973 1974 1975 1976
10	Jela Duncan	2,025	2013 2014 2015 2016

Single season
Rk	Player	Yards	Year
1	**Nate Sheppard**	1,436	2026
2	Mataeo Durant	1,241	2021
3	Steve Jones	1,236	1972
4	Robert Baldwin	1,187	1994
5	Chris Douglas	1,138	2003
6	Nate Sheppard	1,132	2025
7	Randy Cuthbert	1,031	1992
8	Randy Cuthbert	1,023	1989
9	Alex Wade	979	2002
10	Ace Parker	884	1935

Single game
Rk	Player	Yards	Year	Opponent
1	Mataeo Durant	255	2021	Charlotte
2	Shaun Wilson	245	2014	Kansas
3	Robert Baldwin	238	1994	Maryland
4	Randy Cuthbert	234	1989	Georgia Tech
5	Nate Sheppard	227	2026	Tulane
6	Chris Douglas	218	2003	Georgia Tech
7	Nate Sheppard	217	2026	NC State
8	George Clark	214	1945	Wake Forest
9	Steve Jones	204	1971	Florida
10	Steve Jones	201	1972	Wake Forest
	Roger Boone	201	1989	Northwestern

=== Rushing touchdowns ===
Career
Rk	Player	TDs	Years
1	Brandon Connette	31	2010 2011 2012 2013
	**Nate Sheppard**	31	2025 2026
3	Tom Davis	28	1941 1942 1943 1944
4	Jay Calabrese	24	1965 1966 1967
5	Jordan Waters	23	2019 2020 2021 2022 2023
6	Mike Dunn	22	1975 1976 1977 1978
7	Ace Parker	21	1934 1935 1936
	Chris Douglas	21	2000 2001 2002 2003
9	Elmore Hackney	20	1935 1936 1937
	Steve Jones	20	1970 1971 1972
	Randy Cuthbert	20	1988 1989 1990 1991 1992
	Robert Baldwin	20	1991 1992 1993 1994

Single season
Rk	Player	TDs	Year
1	**Nate Sheppard**	20	2026
2	Winston Siegfried	14	1941
	Brandon Connette	14	2013
4	Laymarr Marshall	13	1994
	Riley Leonard	13	2022
6	Mike Dunn	12	1976
	Robert Baldwin	12	1994
	Jordan Waters	12	2023
	Anderson Castle	12	2025
10	Nate Sheppard	11	2025

Single game
Rk	Player	TDs	Year	Opponent
1	Nate Sheppard	5	2026	Boston College
2	Winston Siegfried	4	1941	NC State
	Tom Davis	4	1942	NC State
	Tony Benjamin	4	1975	Wake Forest
	Mike Dunn	4	1976	North Carolina
	Robert Baldwin	4	1994	Maryland
	Justin Boyle	4	2006	Vanderbilt
	Brandon Connette	4	2013	Miami
	Gunnar Holmberg	4	2021	Kansas

== Receiving ==
=== Receptions ===
Career
Rk	Player	Rec	Years
1	Conner Vernon	283	2009 2010 2011 2012
	Jamison Crowder	283	2011 2012 2013 2014
3	T. J. Rahming	253	2015 2016 2017 2018
	Jalon Calhoun	253	2019 2020 2021 2022 2023
5	Donovan Varner	207	2008 2009 2010 2011
6	Clarkston Hines	189	1986 1987 1988 1989
7	Jordan Moore	177	2021 2022 2023 2024
8	Scottie Montgomery	171	1996 1997 1998 1999
9	Roger Boone	168	1986 1987 1988 1989
10	Wes Chesson	164	1968 1969 1970

Single season
Rk	Player	Rec	Year
1	Jamison Crowder	108	2013
2	Conner Vernon	85	2012
	Jamison Crowder	85	2014
4	Jamison Crowder	76	2012
5	T. J. Rahming	75	2018
6	Wes Chesson	74	1970
	Jake Bobo	74	2021
8	Roger Boone	73	1988
	Conner Vernon	73	2010
10	Cooper Barkate	72	2025

Single game
Rk	Player	Rec	Year	Opponent
1	Corey Thomas	16	1997	Georgia Tech
2	Roger Boone	15	1988	Vanderbilt
3	Jon Jensen	14	1994	North Carolina
	Jordan Moore	14	2022	Pittsburgh
5	Henley Carter	13	1968	Clemson
	Wes Chesson	13	1970	Clemson
	Mark Militello	13	1983	Clemson
	Mark Militello	13	1983	Georgia Tech
	Roger Boone	13	1988	Wake Forest
	Corey Thomas	13	1995	Virginia
	Cooper Barkate	13	2025	Georgia Tech

=== Receiving yards ===
Career
Rk	Player	Yards	Years
1	Conner Vernon	3,749	2009 2010 2011 2012
2	Jamison Crowder	3,641	2011 2012 2013 2014
3	Clarkston Hines	3,318	1986 1987 1988 1989
4	Jalon Calhoun	3,026	2019 2020 2021 2022 2023
5	T. J. Rahming	2,919	2015 2016 2017 2018
6	Donovan Varner	2,660	2008 2009 2010 2011
7	Eron Riley	2,413	2005 2006 2007 2008
8	Wes Chesson	2,399	1968 1969 1970
9	Scottie Montgomery	2,378	1996 1997 1998 1999
10	Jordan Moore	2,352	2021 2022 2023 2024

Single season
Rk	Player	Yards	Year
1	Jamison Crowder	1,360	2013
2	Clarkston Hines	1,149	1989
3	Cooper Barkate	1,106	2025
4	Clarkston Hines	1,093	1987
5	Wes Chesson	1,080	1970
6	Jamison Crowder	1,074	2012
	Conner Vernon	1,074	2012
8	Clarkston Hines	1,067	1988
9	Donovan Varner	1,047	2009
10	Jamison Crowder	1,044	2014

Single game
Rk	Player	Yards	Year	Opponent
1	Chris Castor	283	1982	Wake Forest
2	Corey Thomas	276	1997	Georgia Tech
3	Clarkston Hines	251	1989	Wake Forest
4	Scottie Montgomery	243	1998	Vanderbilt
5	T. J. Rahming	240	2018	Temple (Independence Bowl)
6	Eron Riley	235	2007	Navy
7	Henley Carter	209	1968	Clemson
8	Jamison Crowder	203	2012	Miami
9	Jordan Moore	199	2022	Pittsburgh
10	Clarkston Hines	192	1987	NC State

=== Receiving touchdowns ===
Career
Rk	Player	TDs	Years
1	Clarkston Hines	38	1986 1987 1988 1989
2	Corey Thomas	25	1994 1995 1996 1997
3	Jamison Crowder	23	2011 2012 2013 2014
4	Eron Riley	22	2005 2006 2007 2008
5	Cedric Jones	21	1978 1979 1980 1981
	Conner Vernon	21	2009 2010 2011 2012
	Jordan Moore	21	2021 2022 2023 2024
8	Doug Green	18	1983 1984 1985 1986 1987
9	Chris Castor	17	1978 1979 1980 1981 1982
	Walter Jones	17	1988 1989 1990 1991
	Jalon Calhoun	17	2019 2020 2021 2022 2023

Single season
Rk	Player	TDs	Year
1	Clarkston Hines	17	1989
2	Chris Castor	13	1982
3	Clarkston Hines	11	1987
4	Cedric Jones	10	1981
	Clarkston Hines	10	1988
6	Eron Riley	9	2007
	Eli Pancol	9	2024

Single game
Rk	Player	TDs	Year	Opponent
1	Corey Thomas	4	1997	Georgia Tech
	Eron Riley	4	2007	Navy

== Total offense ==
Total offense is the sum of passing and rushing statistics. It does not include receiving or returns.

=== Total offense yards ===
Career
Rk	Player	Yards	Years
1	Thaddeus Lewis	9,987	2006 2007 2008 2009
2	Daniel Jones	9,524	2016 2017 2018
3	Sean Renfree	9,298	2009 2010 2011 2012
4	Spence Fischer	9,108	1992 1993 1994 1995
5	Ben Bennett	9,061	1980 1981 1982 1983
6	Steve Slayden	8,129	1984 1985 1986 1987
7	Anthony Boone	6,589	2011 2012 2013 2014
8	Leo Hart	6,267	1968 1969 1970
9	Dave Brown	5,770	1989 1990 1991
10	Riley Leonard	5,674	2021 2022 2023

Single season
Rk	Player	Yards	Year
1	Darian Mensah	3,941	2025
2	Anthony Dilweg	3,713	1988
3	Riley Leonard	3,666	2022
4	Thomas Sirk	3,428	2015
5	Thaddeus Lewis	3,378	2009
6	Daniel Jones	3,322	2016
7	Sean Renfree	3,084	2010
8	Anthony Boone	3,075	2014
9	Sean Renfree	3,063	2012
10	Daniel Jones	2,993	2018

Single game
Rk	Player	Yards	Year	Opponent
1	Daniel Jones	547	2018	North Carolina
2	Anthony Dilweg	476	1988	Wake Forest
3	Dave Brown	470	1989	North Carolina
4	Thaddeus Lewis	467	2009	NC State
5	Steve Slayden	454	1987	NC State
	Anthony Boone	454	2013	Texas A&M (Chick-fil-A Bowl)
7	Ben Bennett	447	1980	Wake Forest
8	Dave Brown	446	1989	Wake Forest
9	Thaddeus Lewis	437	2007	Navy
10	Sean Renfree	428	2012	Miami
	Quentin Harris	428	2019	North Carolina A&T

=== Touchdowns responsible for ===
"Touchdowns responsible for" is the NCAA's official term for combined passing and rushing touchdowns.

Career
Rk	Player	TDs	Years
1	Thaddeus Lewis	76	2006 2007 2008 2009
2	Daniel Jones	69	2016 2017 2018
3	Sean Renfree	60	2009 2010 2011 2012
4	Ben Bennett	57	1980 1981 1982 1983
5	Steve Slayden	56	1984 1985 1986 1987
6	Spence Fischer	55	1992 1993 1994 1995
7	Anthony Boone	54	2011 2012 2013 2014
8	Dave Brown	49	1989 1990 1991
9	Brandon Connette	47	2010 2011 2012 2013
10	Riley Leonard	43	2021 2022 2023

Single season
Rk	Player	TDs	Year
1	Darian Mensah	35	2025
2	Riley Leonard	33	2022
3	Maalik Murphy	28	2024
4	Brandon Connette	27	2013
5	Anthony Dilweg	26	1988
6	Dave Brown	25	1991
	Daniel Jones	25	2018
8	Thaddeus Lewis	24	2009
	Anthony Boone	24	2014
	Thomas Sirk	24	2015

Single game
Rk	Player	TDs	Year	Opponent
1	Steve Slayden	6	1987	Georgia Tech
	Thaddeus Lewis	6	2009	NC State
	Brandon Connette	6	2013	Pittsburgh
	Daniel Jones	6	2018	Temple (Independence Bowl)
5	Dave Brown	5	1989	Wake Forest
	Thaddeus Lewis	5	2007	Navy
	Brandon Connette	5	2013	Troy
	Brandon Connette	5	2013	Miami
	Quentin Harris	5	2019	North Carolina A&T
	Gunnar Holmberg	5	2021	Kansas
	Nate Sheppard	5	2026	Boston College

== Defense ==
=== Interceptions ===
Career
Rk	Player	Ints	Years
1	John Talley	18	2003 2004 2005 2006
2	Rich Searl	16	1969 1970 1971
3	Fred Folger	13	1946 1947 1948
	Jerry Barger	13	1952 1953 1954
	Wyatt Smith	13	1988 1989 1990 1991
6	Ross Cockrell	12	2010 2011 2012 2013
	Breon Borders	12	2013 2014 2015 2016
8	Robert Brodhead	10	1956 1957 1958
	Erwin Sampson	10	1988 1989 1990 1991
	Leon Wright	10	2006 2007 2008 2009

Single season
Rk	Player	Ints	Year
1	George Skipworth	9	1949
2	Jerry Barger	7	1954
	Rich Searl	7	1970
	John Talley	7	2006
5	John Friedlund	6	1948
	Jerry Barger	6	1953
	Dale Boyd	6	1955
	Craig Hoskins	6	1979
	Bill Obremsky	6	1981
	Wyatt Smith	6	1989
	Mark Gilbert	6	2017

Single game
Rk	Player	Ints	Year	Opponent
1	Fred Folger	3	1947	Maryland
	John Friedlund	3	1948	George Washington
	George Skipworth	3	1949	Tennessee
	George Skipworth	3	1949	George Washington
	Jerry Barger	3	1954	North Carolina
	Mike Davies	3	1971	West Virginia
	Dennis Tabron	3	1980	Clemson

=== Tackles ===
Career
Rk	Player	Tackles	Years
1	Mike Junkin	513	1983 1984 1985 1986
2	Carl McGee	511	1975 1976 1977 1978
3	Ryan Fowler	495	2000 2001 2002 2003
4	Michael Tauiliili	434	2005 2006 2007 2008
5	Erwin Sampson	425	1988 1989 1990 1991
6	Darrell Spells	419	1989 1990 1991 1992
7	Emmett Tilley	405	1979 1980 1981 1982
8	Dave Meier	375	1973 1974 1975
9	Billy Granville	374	1992 1993 1994 1995 1996
10	Keith Stoneback	365	1972 1973 1974

Single season
Rk	Player	Tackles	Year
1	Mike Junkin	188	1986
2	Rich Searl	173	1970
	Keith Stoneback	173	1973
4	Emmett Tilley	164	1981
5	Mike Junkin	162	1985
6	Erwin Sampson	150	1988
	Dave Meier	150	1975
8	Ryan Fowler	145	2002
9	Jim Godfrey	144	1987
10	Terrell Smith	140	2003
	Michael Tauiliili	140	2008

Single game
Rk	Player	Tackles	Year	Opponent
1	Dick Biddle	31	1968	South Carolina
2	Dick Biddle	25	1968	North Carolina
	Mike Junkin	25	1986	Northwestern
4	Keith Stoneback	23	1973	NC State
5	John McNabb	22	1964	Wake Forest
	Keith Stoneback	22	1973	Virginia
	Emmett Tilley	22	1980	East Carolina
	Mike Junkin	22	1986	Clemson
	Erwin Sampson	22	1990	Army
	Chike Egbuniwe	22	1997	NC State
	Terrell Smith	22	2003	Rice

=== Sacks ===
Career
Rk	Player	Sacks	Years
1	Charles Bowser	22.0	1978 1979 1980 1981
2	Victor Dimukeje	21.5	2017 2018 2019 2020
3	Chris Combs	20.0	1996 1997 1998 1999
4	Chris Rumph II	17.5	2018 2019 2020
5	Reggie Andrews	16.0	1983 1984 1985
6	Shawn Johnson	15.0	2000 2001 2002
	Kenny Anunike	15.0	2009 2010 2011 2012 2013
	Vincent Anthony Jr.	15.0	2022 2023 2024 2025
9	Vince Oghobaase	14.0	2006 2007 2008 2009
	R.J. Oben	14.0	2019 2020 2021 2022 2023

Single season
Rk	Player	Sacks	Year
1	Charles Bowser	17.5	1981
2	Ernie Clark	12.0	1973
	Shawn Johnson	12.0	2002
4	Reggie Andrews	10.5	1985
5	Victor Dimukeje	8.5	2019
6	Chris Combs	8.0	1996
	Chris Rumph II	8.0	2020
	Wesley Williams	8.0	2024
9	Victor Dimukeje	7.5	2020
	Vincent Anthony Jr.	7.5	2025

Single game
Rk	Player	Sacks	Year	Opponent
1	Blaine Earon	4.0	1949	Georgia Tech
2	Chris Rumph II	3.5	2019	Miami
	Victor Dimukeje	3.5	2020	Boston College
4	Scott Youmans	3.0	1990	South Carolina
	Travis Pearson	3.0	1991	Vanderbilt
	Ryan Stallmeyer	3.0	1999	Clemson
	Shawn Johnson	3.0	2002	Clemson
	Phillip Alexander	3.0	2003	Florida State
	Victor Dimukeje	3.0	2019	Georgia Tech
	Chris Rumph II	3.0	2020	Charlotte
	Vincent Anthony Jr.	3.0	2025	Illinois

== Kicking ==
=== Field goals made ===
Career
Rk	Player	FGs	Years
1	Ross Martin	78	2012 2013 2014 2015
2	Sims Lenhardt	55	1996 1997 1998 1999
	Todd Pelino	55	2022 2023 2024 2025
4	Will Snyderwine	46	2009 2010 2011
5	Doug Peterson	37	1986 1987 1988
6	Tom Cochran	36	1993 1994 1995
	Charlie Ham	36	2019 2020 2021 2022 2023
8	Brent Garber	34	2000 2001 2002 2003
9	Randy Gardner	33	1989 1990 1991 1992
10	Scott McKinney	32	1978 1979 1980 1981

Single season
Rk	Player	FGs	Year
1	Ross Martin	26	2015
2	Will Snyderwine	21	2010
3	Ross Martin	20	2012
4	Ross Martin	19	2014
5	Todd Pelino	18	2023
6	Will Snyderwine	17	2009
	Austin Parker	17	2017
8	Sims Lenhardt	16	1997
	Sims Lenhardt	16	1998
10	Doug Peterson	15	1987
	AJ Reed	15	2019
	Todd Pelino	15	2024

Single game
Rk	Player	FGs	Year	Opponent
1	Vince Fusco	6	1976	Clemson
2	Doug Peterson	5	1987	Maryland
	Will Snyderwine	5	2009	Virginia

=== Field goal percentage ===
Career
Rk	Player	FG%	Years
1	Ross Martin	83.9%	2012 2013 2014 2015
2	Todd Pelino	77.5%	2022 2023 2024 2025
3	Will Snyderwine	75.4%	2009 2010 2011
4	Sims Lenhardt	73.3%	1996 1997 1998 1999
5	Doug Peterson	72.5%	1986 1987 1988
6	Charlie Ham	72.0%	2019 2020 2021 2022 2023
7	Matt Brooks	67.9%	2001 2002 2003 2004
8	AJ Reed	64.3%	2016 2019
9	Tom Cochran	63.2%	1993 1994 1995
10	Scott McKinney	61.5%	1978 1979 1980 1981

Single season
Rk	Player	FG%	Year
1	Ross Martin	90.5%	2014
2	Will Snyderwine	87.5%	2010
3	Ross Martin	87.0%	2012
4	Ross Martin	86.7%	2015
	Charlie Ham	86.7%	2020
6	Will Snyderwine	85.0%	2009
7	AJ Reed	83.3%	2019
8	Ken Harper	81.3%	1984
9	Sims Lenhardt	80.0%	1997
10	Todd Pelino	78.3%	2023
