= 1996 Duke Blue Devils football team =

American college football season

1996 Duke Blue Devils football
- Conference: Atlantic Coast Conference
- Record: 0–11 (0–8 ACC)
- Head coach: Fred Goldsmith (3rd season)
- Offensive coordinator: Larry Beckish (1st season)
- Defensive coordinator: Bob Trott (1st season)
- MVP: Billy Granville
- Captains: Gerald Ford; Billy Granville; John Krueger
- Home stadium: Wallace Wade Stadium

1996 Atlantic Coast Conference football standings
	Conf.			Overall
Team	W		L	W		L
No. 3 Florida State $	8	–	0	11	–	1
No. 10 North Carolina	6	–	2	10	–	2
Clemson	6	–	2	7	–	5
Virginia	5	–	3	7	–	5
Georgia Tech	4	–	4	5	–	6
Maryland	3	–	5	5	–	6
NC State	3	–	5	3	–	8
Wake Forest	1	–	7	3	–	8
Duke	0	–	8	0	–	11
$ – Conference champion; Rankings from AP Poll

The 1996 Duke Blue Devils football team represented Duke University as a member of the Atlantic Coast Conference (ACC) during the 1996 NCAA Division I-A football season. Led by third-year head coach Fred Goldsmith, the Blue Devils compiled an overall record of 0–11 with a mark of 0–8 in conference play, and finished ninth in the ACC. Duke played home games at Wallace Wade Stadium in Durham, North Carolina.

== Schedule ==
Date	Time	Opponent	Site	TV	Result	Attendance	Source
September 7	3:30 pm	at No. 3 Florida State	Doak Campbell Stadium; Tallahassee, FL	ABC	L 7–44	70,181	
September 14	3:30 pm	Northwestern*	Wallace Wade Stadium; Durham, NC	ABC	L 13–38	29,321	
September 21	12:00 pm	at Army*	Michie Stadium; West Point, NY	HTS	L 17–35	36,049	
September 26	8:00 pm	at Georgia Tech	Bobby Dodd Stadium; Atlanta, GA	ESPN	L 22–48	44,145	
October 5	12:00 pm	at Navy*	Navy–Marine Corps Memorial Stadium; Annapolis, MD	HTS	L 27–64	31,365	
October 12	12:00 pm	Clemson^{†}	Wallace Wade Stadium; Durham, NC	JPS	L 6–13	23,586	
October 26	12:00 pm	Maryland	Wallace Wade Stadium; Durham, NC	JPS	L 19–22	18,751	
November 2	1:30 pm	No. 16 Virginia	Wallace Wade Stadium; Durham, NC		L 3–27	28,276	
November 9	12:00 pm	at NC State	Carter–Finley Stadium; Raleigh, NC (rivalry)	JPS	L 22–44	47,200	
November 16	1:30 pm	at Wake Forest	Groves Stadium; Winston-Salem, NC (rivalry)		L 16–17	17,842	
November 23	12:00 pm	No. 13 North Carolina	Wallace Wade Stadium; Durham, NC (Victory Bell)	JPS	L 10–27	30,264	
*Non-conference game; ^{†}Homecoming; Rankings from AP Poll released prior to the game; All times are in Eastern time

== Roster ==
1996 Duke Blue Devils football team roster
Players
Coaches
Offense

Pos.	#	Name	Class
C	71	Troy Andrew	Fr
TE	80	Doug Burt	Fr
QB	15	Bobby Campbell	Fr
OT	66	Phillip Chappell	Sr
QB	11	Dave Green	Jr
WR	16	Dominique Flemming	Sr
FL	22	Richmond Flowers	Fr
TE	86	Gerald Ford	Jr
G	74	Lennie Friedman	So
WR	29	Adam Geis	Jr
C	62	John Gordon	Jr
G	55	Patrick Mannelly	Jr
RB	32	Laymarr Marshall	Jr
WR	33	Scottie Montgomery	Fr
WR	81	Joe Opalenick	Jr
RB	3	Reco Owens	So
OT	69	Gannon Shepherd	Fr
WR	5	Cedric Tate	So
WR	8	Corey Thomas	Jr

Defense

Pos.	#	Name	Class
LB	60	Mike Alberto	Fr
LB	31	Randy Ament	Fr
DT	70	Troy Austin	Fr
DE	82	Joey Bachstein	Fr
SS	13	Darius Clark	Fr
DE	93	Chris Combs	Fr
CB	37	Lamar Grant	Fr
LB	52	Billy Granville	Sr
CB	20	Kenan Holley	So
CB	10	Jason Jenkins	Fr
LB	50	Ryan Jenkins	Fr
FS	23	Eric Jones	Fr
LB	58	Kendral Knight	Fr
LB	45	Jim Kovach	So
SS	40	Brian Krenzel	So
LB	99	Brian McCormack	So
LB	1	LeVance McQueen	Jr
CB	2	Brandon Pollock	Sr
SS	30	Luke Roush	Fr
DE	96	Chris Ruzic	So
OLB	83	Jim Sitter	Sr
ILB	47	Jared Smith	Fr

Special teams

Pos.	#	Name	Class
P	19	John Krueger	Jr
K	12	Sims Lenhardt	Fr

Head coach

- Fred Goldsmith

Coordinators/assistant coaches

Legend

- (C) Team captain
- (S) Suspended
- (I) Ineligible
- Injured
- Redshirt

Roster
Last update: 1997-01-27
