= Kurt Roper =

American football player and coach (born 1972)

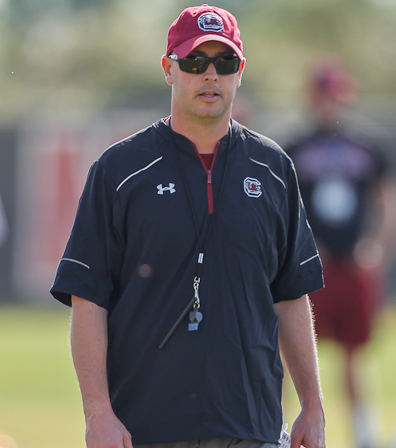
- Roper with South Carolina in 2016

Current position
- Title: Offensive coordinator & quarterbacks coach
- Team: NC State
- Conference: ACC

Biographical details
- Born: July 25, 1972 (age 54); Ames, Iowa, U.S.
- Education: University of Tennessee

Playing career
- 1991–1994: Rice
- Positions: Quarterback, defensive back

Coaching career (HC unless noted)
- 1996–1998: Tennessee (GA)
- 1999–2001: Ole Miss (QB)
- 2002–2004: Ole Miss (QB/PGC)
- 2005: Kentucky (QB)
- 2006–2007: Tennessee (RB)
- 2008–2013: Duke (OC/QB)
- 2014: Florida (OC/QB)
- 2015: Cleveland Browns (off. analyst)
- 2016–2017: South Carolina (co-OC/QB)
- 2018: Colorado (QB)
- 2018: Colorado (interim HC)
- 2019: NC State (QB)
- 2020–2022: NC State (RB)
- 2023–2024: NC State (QB)
- 2025–present: NC State (OC/QB)

Head coaching record
- Overall: 0–1

Kurt Roper (born July 25, 1972) is an American football coach and former player. He is currently the offensive coordinator and quarterbacks coach at North Carolina State University. Roper was the interim head football coach at University of Colorado Boulder for the final game of the 2018 season. He previously served as the offensive coordinator and quarterbacks coach at the University of South Carolina for two seasons. He also served as the offensive coordinator at the University of Florida in 2014 and Duke University for six seasons prior to that. A native of Ames, Iowa, he was starting quarterback for Ardmore (OK) High School, where he led the Tigers to a 1990 state championship. Roper earned three varsity letters as a quarterback and defensive back at Rice before graduating in 1995. He earned a master's degree from the University of Tennessee in 1998. His coaching career has been much associated with that of David Cutcliffe.

== Career ==
Roper's coaching career started as a graduate assistant at the University of Tennessee in 1996, working on defense, especially the defensive backs, and special teams. While the Volunteers prepared for a national championship, Roper decided to follow Tennessee offensive coordinator David Cutcliffe to Mississippi, where Roper would spend six years as an offensive assistant under Cutcliffe at head coach. Amongst those coached by Roper during this time was the first pick of the 2004 NFL draft, quarterback Eli Manning. During these years Ole Miss went 44–29, including a 10-3 2003 campaign which was its best record since 1971.

In 2005 Roper coached quarterbacks for Kentucky under head coach Rich Brooks and offensive coordinator Joker Phillips.

Roper joined up again with Cutcliffe in 2006 when Phillip Fulmer named him an assistant coach for running backs. Amongst those coached by Roper was Arian Foster. Roper left in 2008, when David Cutcliffe was named head coach at Duke, he followed as the Blue Devils' offensive coordinator.

At Duke, Roper coached Thad Lewis from 2008 to 2009. Lewis set many records at Duke and finished his career as the school's all-time leader in pass attempts (1,510), pass completions (877), passing yards (10,065) and passing touchdowns (67).

From 2010 to 2012 Roper coached Sean Renfree. Duke averaged 381.3 yards per game in 2010, the most for the Blue Devils since their 1989 ACC championship team. In 2013, Roper was a finalist for the Broyles Award, given annually to the nation's top college football assistant coach.

On December 6, 2015, Roper was hired to serve as offensive coordinator on Will Muschamp's staff at South Carolina.

On January 3, 2018, Roper was hired to serve as quarterbacks coach at Colorado. He served as quarterbacks coach for the first eleven games of the 2018 season, until Mike MacIntyre was fired, when he was named interim head coach for the final game of the 2018 season.

On December 30, 2024, Roper was elevated to offensive coordinator/quarterbacks coach at NC State, replacing Robert Anae.

== Head coaching record ==
Year	Team	Overall	Conference	Standing
Colorado Buffaloes (Pac-12 Conference) (2018)
2018	Colorado	0–1^{‡}	0–1^{‡}	6th (North)
Colorado:		0–1	0–1	^{‡}Named interim head coach on November 18
Total:		0–1		
