= Corey Thomas =

Corey Thomas may refer to:

- Corey Thomas (American football) (born 1975)
- Corey Thomas (rugby union) (born 1994)
