= 1990 Clemson Tigers football team =

American college football season

1990 Clemson Tigers football

Hall of Fame Bowl champion

Hall of Fame Bowl, W 30–0 vs. Illinois
- Conference: Atlantic Coast Conference

Ranking
- Coaches: No. 9
- AP: No. 9
- Record: 10–2 (5–2 ACC)
- Head coach: Ken Hatfield (1st season)
- Offensive coordinator: Larry Van Der Hayden (1st season)
- Defensive coordinator: Bob Trott (1st season)
- Captains: Stacy Fields; Vance Hammond
- Home stadium: Memorial Stadium

1990 Atlantic Coast Conference football standings
	Conf.					Overall
Team	W		L		T	W		L		T
No. 2 Georgia Tech $	6	–	0	–	1	11	–	0	–	1
No. 9 Clemson	5	–	2	–	0	10	–	2	–	0
No. 23 Virginia	5	–	2	–	0	8	–	4	–	0
Maryland	4	–	3	–	0	6	–	5	–	1
North Carolina	3	–	3	–	1	6	–	4	–	1
NC State	3	–	4	–	0	7	–	5	–	0
Duke	1	–	6	–	0	4	–	7	–	0
Wake Forest	0	–	7	–	0	3	–	8	–	0
$ – Conference champion; Rankings from AP Poll

The 1990 Clemson Tigers football team represented Clemson University as a member of the Atlantic Coast Conference (ACC) during the 1990 NCAA Division I-A football season. Led by first-year head coach Ken Hatfield, the Tigers compiled an overall record of 10–2 with a mark of 5–2 in conference play, and finished second in the ACC. Clemson played home games at Memorial Stadium in Clemson, South Carolina. Clemson's 500th win came October 27 against Wake Forest.

== Schedule ==
Date	Time	Opponent	Rank	Site	TV	Result	Attendance	Source
September 1	1:00 p.m.	Long Beach State*	No. 10	Memorial Stadium; Clemson, SC		W 59–0	74,250	
September 8	4:00 p.m.	at No. 14 Virginia	No. 9	Scott Stadium; Charlottesville, VA	ESPN	L 7–20	46,800	
September 15	12:00 p.m.	at Maryland	No. 16	Memorial Stadium; Baltimore, MD		W 18–17	39,255	
September 22	1:00 p.m.	No. 16 (I-AA) Appalachian State*	No. 17	Memorial Stadium; Clemson, SC		W 48–0	77,716	
September 29	12:00 p.m.	Duke	No. 19	Memorial Stadium; Clemson, SC	JPS	W 27–7	81,066	
October 6	1:00 p.m.	Georgia*	No. 16	Memorial Stadium; Clemson, SC (rivalry)		W 34–3	83,127	
October 13	12:00 p.m.	at No. 18 Georgia Tech	No. 15	Bobby Dodd Stadium; Atlanta, GA (rivalry)	JPS	L 19–21	46,066	
October 20	12:00 p.m.	at NC State	No. 22	Carter–Finley Stadium; Raleigh, NC (Textile Bowl)	JPS	W 24–17	46,500	
October 27	1:00 p.m.	at Wake Forest	No. 19	Groves Stadium; Winston-Salem, NC		W 24–6	25,317	
November 3	12:00 p.m.	North Carolina	No. 18	Memorial Stadium; Clemson, SC	JPS	W 20–3	75,196	
November 17	1:00 p.m.	South Carolina*	No. 17	Memorial Stadium; Clemson, SC (rivalry)	JPS	W 25–15	83,823	
January 1, 1991	1:00 p.m.	vs. No. 16 Illinois*	No. 14	Tampa Stadium; Tampa, FL (Hall of Fame Bowl)	NBC	W 30–0	63,154	
*Non-conference game; Rankings from AP Poll released prior to the game; All times are in Eastern time
