= Cherry Bowl =

Cherry Bowl (defunct)
- poster from the 1985 Cherry Bowl
- Stadium: Pontiac Silverdome
- Operated: 1984–1985
- Succeeded by: Motor City Bowl

1985 matchup
- Maryland over Syracuse (35–18)

The Cherry Bowl was an annual post-season college football bowl game played in the Pontiac Silverdome in Pontiac, Michigan, in 1984 and 1985. The Cherry Bowl was an early attempt to bring a game to Michigan, years before the Motor City Bowl (later known as the Little Caesars Pizza Bowl) and its successor the Quick Lane Bowl (later known as the GameAbove Sports Bowl).

== History ==
The Cherry Bowl's inaugural 1984 game drew more than 70,000 to an Army–Michigan State matchup. This game was noteworthy as Army's first-ever bowl game appearance.

The mid-1980s were a time of upheaval in college football. The end of NCAA control over television rights resulted in a major increase in televised games, and TV rights fees dropped sharply amid the resulting glut, something not anticipated by the Cherry Bowl organizers. Adding to their problems, without the local Michigan State team, attendance for the 1985 game between Maryland and Syracuse fell by nearly 20,000. For 1985, the bowl promised $1.2 million to each team, the fifth-highest payout among all bowls.

The national anthem, half-time, and post-game shows were performed by area high school marching bands. For the 1984 game, the national anthem and the post-game show were performed by the Marching Railroaders from Durand, Michigan. The Clio Area High School Marching Band performed a pre-game show and joined the Marching Railroaders along with the Michigan State Marching Band to perform a holiday half-time show.

Negotiations with General Motors to become the game's title sponsor failed. Unable to meet its payout obligation and more than $1 million in debt, the Cherry Bowl folded after its second edition.

== Game results ==
List of Cherry Bowl match-ups
| Date | Winner | | Loser | | Notes |
|---|---|---|---|---|---|
| December 22, 1984 | Army | 10 | Michigan State | 6 | notes |
| December 21, 1985 | Maryland | 35 | Syracuse | 18 | notes |

== Game summaries ==
=== 1984 Cherry Bowl ===
| | 1 | 2 | 3 | 4 | Total |
|---|---|---|---|---|---|
| Black Knights | 0 | 7 | 0 | 3 | 10 |
| Spartans | 0 | 0 | 0 | 6 | 6 |

1984 saw the first edition of the Cherry Bowl, between Army and Michigan State. It was Army's first bowl game in program history, and Michigan State's first since the 1966 Rose Bowl.

The first quarter of the game ended without score; a second quarter 4-yard touchdown gave Army a 7–0 halftime lead. After a scoreless third quarter, Army converted a 35-yard FG in the 4th to extend its lead to 10–0. Michigan State attempted a comeback with a 36-yard touchdown, but a failed two-point conversion led to a 10–6 final.

=== 1985 Cherry Bowl ===
| | 1 | 2 | 3 | 4 | Total |
|---|---|---|---|---|---|
| Terrapins | 6 | 22 | 7 | 0 | 35 |
| Orange | 3 | 7 | 8 | 0 | 18 |

The 1985 Cherry Bowl was the second and last to be played, this one contested by Maryland and Syracuse. The scoring opened in the 1st with a 26-yard Syracuse field goal. Maryland countered with a 4-yard touchdown run, making it 6–3. A 10-yard run in the 2nd gave Syracuse a 10–6 lead; however, the Terrapins overpowered Syracuse, scoring 29 consecutive points, and Syracuse was unable to rally in a 35–18 Maryland victory.

== See also ==
- List of college bowl games
