= Anthony Boone =

Anthony Boone may refer to:

- Anthony Boone (gridiron football) (born 1991), American football quarterback
- Anthony Boone (basketball) (born 1976), American college basketball player and coach
