= 1990 North Carolina Tar Heels football team =

American college football season

1990 North Carolina Tar Heels football
- Conference: Atlantic Coast Conference
- Record: 6–4–1 (3–3–1 ACC)
- Head coach: Mack Brown (3rd season)
- Offensive scheme: Multiple
- Defensive coordinator: Carl Torbush (3rd season)
- Base defense: 4–3
- Captain: Dwight Hollier
- Home stadium: Kenan Memorial Stadium

1990 Atlantic Coast Conference football standings
	Conf.					Overall
Team	W		L		T	W		L		T
No. 2 Georgia Tech $	6	–	0	–	1	11	–	0	–	1
No. 9 Clemson	5	–	2	–	0	10	–	2	–	0
No. 23 Virginia	5	–	2	–	0	8	–	4	–	0
Maryland	4	–	3	–	0	6	–	5	–	1
North Carolina	3	–	3	–	1	6	–	4	–	1
NC State	3	–	4	–	0	7	–	5	–	0
Duke	1	–	6	–	0	4	–	7	–	0
Wake Forest	0	–	7	–	0	3	–	8	–	0
$ – Conference champion; Rankings from AP Poll

The 1990 North Carolina Tar Heels football team represented the University of North Carolina at Chapel Hill during the 1990 NCAA Division I-A football season. The Tar Heels played their home games at Kenan Memorial Stadium in Chapel Hill, North Carolina and competed in the Atlantic Coast Conference. The team was led by head coach Mack Brown.

== Schedule ==
Date	Time	Opponent	Site	TV	Result	Attendance	Source
September 1	1:30 p.m.	Miami (OH)*	Kenan Memorial Stadium; Chapel Hill, NC		W 34–0	47,500	
September 8	7:00 p.m.	at South Carolina*	Williams–Brice Stadium; Columbia, SC (rivalry)		L 5–27	73,500	
September 15	1:30 p.m.	Connecticut*	Kenan Memorial Stadium; Chapel Hill, NC		W 48–21	41,000	
September 22	1:30 p.m.	Kentucky*	Kenan Memorial Stadium; Chapel Hill, NC		W 16–13	43,000	
September 29	1:30 p.m.	NC State	Kenan Memorial Stadium; Chapel Hill, NC (rivalry)		L 9–12	53,000	
October 6	7:00 p.m.	at Wake Forest	Groves Stadium; Winston-Salem, NC (rivalry)		W 31–24	27,711	
October 20	1:30 p.m.	No. 11 Georgia Tech	Kenan Memorial Stadium; Chapel Hill, NC		T 13–13	48,000	
October 27	1:30 p.m.	Maryland	Kenan Memorial Stadium; Chapel Hill, NC		W 34–10	46,000	
November 3	12:10 p.m.	at No. 18 Clemson	Memorial Stadium; Clemson, SC	JPS	L 3–20	75,196	
November 10	12:10 p.m.	No. 11 Virginia	Kenan Memorial Stadium; Chapel Hill, NC (South's Oldest Rivalry)	JPS	L 10–24	41,000	
November 17	12:10 p.m.	at Duke	Wallace Wade Stadium; Durham, NC (Victory Bell)		W 24–22	31,600	
*Non-conference game; Rankings from AP Poll released prior to the game; All times are in Eastern time
