= 1985 Cherry Bowl =

- Final edition bowl game
Maryland Terrapins	Syracuse Orangemen
(8–3)	(7–4)
35	18
Head coach: Bobby Ross	Head coach: Dick MacPherson
AP / Coaches; 20 / NR
	1	2	3	4	Total
Maryland	6	22	7	0	35
Syracuse	3	7	8	0	18
- Date: December 21, 1985
- Stadium: Pontiac Silverdome
- Location: Pontiac, Michigan
- MVP: Stan Gelbaugh, QB, Maryland
- Referee: Don Baur (MAC)
- Attendance: 51,858

United States TV coverage
- Network: Mizlou, USA Network
- Announcers: Ray Lane and Jim Brandstatter

The 1985 Cherry Bowl was a postseason college football bowl game between the Atlantic Coast Conference's Maryland Terrapins and the Syracuse Orangemen. After an early 10–6 lead, The Orangemen gave up 29 unanswered second-quarter points, falling too far behind for a comeback and allowing the Terps to win with a final score of 35–18.

Although it was only the second edition, the bowl folded after this game when the Cherry Bowl committee found it was more than $2,000,000 over budget. This ended postseason college football in Detroit until 1997, when the Motor City Bowl launched and the MAC Championship Game was first played on a neutral site.

== Scoring summary ==
=== First quarter ===
- Syracuse – McAulay 26, field goal
- Maryland – Gelbaugh 4, run (kick failed)

=== Second quarter ===
- Syracuse -Drummond 10, run (McAulay kick)
- Maryland -Knight 3, pass from Gelbaugh (Badajnek run)
- Maryland -Tye 8, fumble recovery (Plocki kick)
- Maryland -Blount 20, run (Plocki kick)

=== Third quarter ===
- Maryland – Abdur-Ra’oof 6, pass from Gelbaugh (Plocki kick)
- Syracuse – McPherson 17, run (Schwedes from McPherson)

== Statistics ==
Statistics	Syracuse	Maryland
First downs	28	22
Rushing yards	241	244
Passing yards	204	223
Total yards	445	467
Interceptions	1	3
Punts–average	1/52.0	3/38.7
Fumbles–lost	3/2	0/0
Penalties–yards	3/26	5/54
