= 1985 Georgia Tech Yellow Jackets football team =

American college football season

1985 Georgia Tech Yellow Jackets football
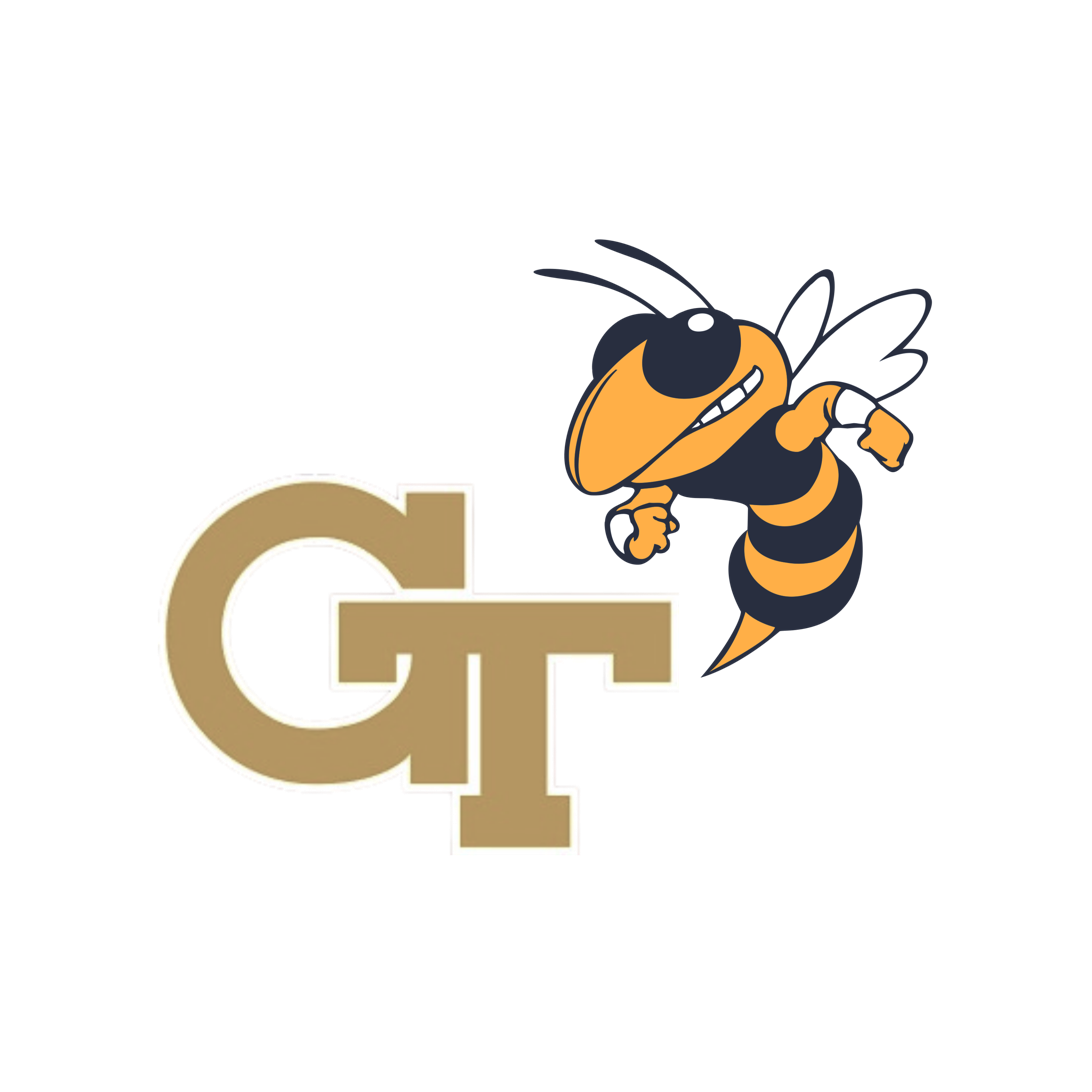

Hall of Fame Classic champion

All-American Bowl, W 17–14 vs. Michigan State
- Conference: Atlantic Coast Conference

Ranking
- Coaches: No. 18
- AP: No. 19
- Record: 9–2–1 (5–1 ACC)
- Head coach: Bill Curry (6th season)
- Offensive coordinator: Dwain Painter (4th season)
- Defensive coordinator: Don Lindsey (2nd season)
- Captains: John Ivemeyer; Ted Roof; Mike Snow
- Home stadium: Grant Field

1985 Atlantic Coast Conference football standings
	Conf.					Overall
Team	W		L		T	W		L		T
No. 18 Maryland $	6	–	0	–	0	9	–	3	–	0
No. 19 Georgia Tech	5	–	1	–	0	9	–	2	–	1
Virginia	4	–	3	–	0	6	–	5	–	0
Clemson	4	–	3	–	0	6	–	6	–	0
North Carolina	3	–	4	–	0	5	–	6	–	0
Duke	2	–	5	–	0	4	–	7	–	0
NC State	2	–	5	–	0	3	–	8	–	0
Wake Forest	1	–	6	–	0	4	–	7	–	0
$ – Conference champion; Rankings from AP Poll

The 1985 Georgia Tech Yellow Jackets football team represented the Georgia Institute of Technology in the 1985 NCAA Division I-A football season. The Yellow Jackets were led by sixth-year head coach Bill Curry and played their home games at Grant Field in Atlanta. In their third season as members of the Atlantic Coast Conference, they finished in second with an ACC record of 5–1. They were invited to the All-American Bowl, where they defeated Michigan State, 17–14. The Yellow Jackets finished ranked in both the AP Poll and the Coaches' Poll for the first time in 15 years.

== Schedule ==
Date	Opponent	Site	TV	Result	Attendance	Source
September 14	at NC State	Carter–Finley Stadium; Raleigh, NC	Raycom	W 28–18	32,100	
September 21	Virginia	Grant Field; Atlanta, GA		L 13–24	38,291	
September 28	at Clemson	Memorial Stadium; Clemson, SC (rivalry)		W 14–3	78,000	
October 5	North Carolina	Grant Field; Atlanta, GA	Raycom	W 31–0	35,625	
October 12	Western Carolina*^{†}	Grant Field; Atlanta, GA		W 24–17	36,111	
October 19	No. 8 Auburn*	Grant Field; Atlanta, GA (rivalry)	CBS	L 14–17	57,501	
October 26	at No. 16 Tennessee*	Neyland Stadium; Knoxville, TN (rivalry)	ESPN	T 6–6	94,575	
November 2	at Duke	Wallace Wade Stadium; Durham, NC		W 9–0	14,400	
November 9	Chattanooga*	Grant Field; Atlanta, GA		W 35–7	25,763	
November 16	Wake Forest	Grant Field; Atlanta, GA	Raycom	W 41–10	28,575	
November 30	No. 20 Georgia*	Grant Field; Atlanta, GA (Clean, Old-Fashioned Hate)	TBS	W 20–16	59,602	
December 31	vs. Michigan State*	Legion Field; Birmingham, AL (Hall of Fame Classic)	TBS	W 17–14	45,000	
*Non-conference game; ^{†}Homecoming; Rankings from AP Poll released prior to the game

== Roster ==
1985 Georgia Tech Yellow Jackets football team roster
Players
Coaches
Offense

Pos.	#	Name	Class
RB		Robert Lavette
WR		David Dean	Sr
TE		Robert Massey
OL		Andy Hearn
OL		John Ivemeyer
OL		John Thomas
OL		John Davis
OL		Sam Bracken
QB		John Dewberry

Defense

Pos.	#	Name	Class
DL		Ivry Lee
LB		Pat Swilling
LB		Ted Roof
DB		Mike Travis
DL		Mark Pike
LB		Jim Anderson
LB		Todd Ellis
DB		Cleve Pounds
DB		Anthony Harrison

Special teams

Pos.	#	Name	Class
K		Thomas Palmer
P		Mike Snow

Head coach

- Bill Curry

Coordinators/assistant coaches

- Dwain Painter – Offensive coordinator
- Chip Wisdom – Running backs
- Mark Hendrickson – Wide receivers
- Jack Fligg – Offensive tackle/tight ends
- Don Lindsey – Defensive coordinator
- Larry New – Defensive line
- John Guy – Defensive ends
- Rick Smith – Defensive backs
- Keith Colson – Defensive backs
- Mac McWhorter – Assistant head coach

Legend

- (C) Team captain
- (S) Suspended
- (I) Ineligible
- Injured
- Redshirt
