= 1990 Maryland Terrapins football team =

American college football season

1990 Maryland Terrapins football

Independence Bowl, T 34–34 vs. Louisiana Tech
- Conference: Atlantic Coast Conference
- Record: 6–5–1 (4–3 ACC)
- Head coach: Joe Krivak (4th season)
- Defensive coordinator: Greg Williams (4th season)
- Home stadium: Byrd Stadium

1990 Atlantic Coast Conference football standings
	Conf.					Overall
Team	W		L		T	W		L		T
No. 2 Georgia Tech $	6	–	0	–	1	11	–	0	–	1
No. 9 Clemson	5	–	2	–	0	10	–	2	–	0
No. 23 Virginia	5	–	2	–	0	8	–	4	–	0
Maryland	4	–	3	–	0	6	–	5	–	1
North Carolina	3	–	3	–	1	6	–	4	–	1
NC State	3	–	4	–	0	7	–	5	–	0
Duke	1	–	6	–	0	4	–	7	–	0
Wake Forest	0	–	7	–	0	3	–	8	–	0
$ – Conference champion; Rankings from AP Poll

The 1990 Maryland Terrapins football team represented University of Maryland, College Park in the 1990 NCAA Division I-A football season. The Terrapins offense scored 237 points while the defense allowed 284 points. Led by head coach Joe Krivak, the Terrapins appeared in the Independence Bowl against Louisiana Tech and tied the Bulldogs, 34–34.

== Schedule ==
Date	Time	Opponent	Site	TV	Result	Attendance	Source
September 1	12:00 pm	Virginia Tech*	Byrd Stadium; College Park, MD	JPS	W 20–13	34,198	
September 8	1:00 pm	at No. 25 West Virginia*	Mountaineer Field; Morgantown, WV (rivalry)		W 14–10	64,950	
September 15	12:00 pm	No. 16 Clemson	Memorial Stadium; Baltimore, MD		L 17-18	39,255	
September 22	12:00 pm	NC State	Byrd Stadium; College Park, MD		W 13–12	25,371	
September 29	1:00 pm	at No. 6 Michigan*	Michigan Stadium; Ann Arbor, MI		L 17–45	102,894	
October 6	12:00 pm	No. 23 Georgia Tech	Byrd Stadium; College Park, MD	JPS	L 3–31	31,941	
October 13	12:00 pm	Wake Forest^{†}	Byrd Stadium; College Park, MD		W 41–13	27,554	
October 20	12:00 pm	at Duke	Wallace Wade Stadium; Durham, NC		W 23–20	23,200	
October 27	1:30 pm	at North Carolina	Kenan Memorial Stadium; Chapel Hill, NC		L 10–34	46,000	
November 10	1:00 pm	No. 21 Penn State*	Beaver Stadium; University Park, PA (rivalry)		L 10–24	83,000	
November 17	12:00 pm	at No. 8 Virginia	Scott Stadium; Charlottesville, VA (rivalry)	JPS	W 35–30	43,500	
December 15	8:00 pm	vs. Louisiana Tech*	Independence Stadium; Shreveport, LA (Independence Bowl)	ABC	T 34–34	48,325	
*Non-conference game; ^{†}Homecoming; Rankings from AP Poll released prior to the game; All times are in Eastern time

== 1991 NFL draft ==
The following players were selected in the 1991 NFL draft.

Player	Position	Round	Overall	NFL team
Scott Zolak	Quarterback	4	84	New England Patriots
Clarence Jones	Tackle	4	111	New York Giants
O'Neil Glenn	Guard	9	224	New England Patriots
