= Barry Wilson (American football) =

American football player and coach (born 1943)

Biographical details
- Born: May 12, 1943 (age 83); Savannah, Georgia, U.S.

Playing career
- 1962–1963, 1965: Georgia
- Position: Linebacker

Coaching career (HC unless noted)
- 1967–1970: Georgia (freshmen)
- 1971–1973: Georgia (DE)
- 1974–1976: Ole Miss (LB)
- 1977–1982: Georgia Tech (LB)
- 1983: Tampa Bay Bandits (DL)
- 1984–1985: Tampa Bay Bandits (DC)
- 1987–1989: Duke (assistant)
- 1990–1993: Duke
- 1996–1997: Florida (ST/LB)

Head coaching record
- Overall: 13–30–1

Accomplishments and honors

Awards
- Second-team All-SEC (1964)

Barry Wilson (born May 12, 1943) is an American former football player and coach. He served as the head coach at Duke University from 1990 to 1993.

Wilson was born in Savannah, Georgia, and attended the Benedictine Military School and the University of Georgia, graduating in 1965.

Wilson served as a defensive assistant under Steve Spurrier with the United States Football League's Tampa Bay Bandits and at Duke, and was promoted to head coach after Spurrier left for Florida shortly after leading the Blue Devils to a share of the Atlantic Coast Conference title. Wilson was unable to maintain the modest success Duke had enjoyed under Spurrier. A year after winning a share of the conference title, Wilson's first team crumbled to a 4–7 record and won just one game in ACC play. He compiled a record of 13–30–1 in four years, winning just four games in ACC play.

== Head coaching record ==
Year	Team	Overall	Conference	Standing
Duke Blue Devils (Atlantic Coast Conference) (1990–1993)
1990	Duke	4–7	1–6	7th
1991	Duke	4–6–1	1–6	7th
1992	Duke	2–9	0–8	9th
1993	Duke	3–8	2–6	T–7th
Duke:		13–30–1	4–26	
Total:		13–30–1		
