= 1985 Wake Forest Demon Deacons football team =

American college football season

1985 Wake Forest Demon Deacons football
- Conference: Atlantic Coast Conference
- Record: 4–7 (1–6 ACC)
- Head coach: Al Groh (5th season)
- Defensive coordinator: Bob Pruett (1st season)
- Captains: Gary Baldinger; Foy White
- Home stadium: Groves Stadium

1985 Atlantic Coast Conference football standings
	Conf.					Overall
Team	W		L		T	W		L		T
No. 18 Maryland $	6	–	0	–	0	9	–	3	–	0
No. 19 Georgia Tech	5	–	1	–	0	9	–	2	–	1
Virginia	4	–	3	–	0	6	–	5	–	0
Clemson	4	–	3	–	0	6	–	6	–	0
North Carolina	3	–	4	–	0	5	–	6	–	0
Duke	2	–	5	–	0	4	–	7	–	0
NC State	2	–	5	–	0	3	–	8	–	0
Wake Forest	1	–	6	–	0	4	–	7	–	0
$ – Conference champion; Rankings from AP Poll

The 1985 Wake Forest Demon Deacons football team was an American football team that represented Wake Forest University during the 1985 NCAA Division I-A football season. In their fifth season under head coach Al Groh, the Demon Deacons compiled a 4–7 record and finished in last place in the Atlantic Coast Conference.

== Schedule ==
Date	Opponent	Site	Result	Attendance	Source
September 7	William & Mary*	Groves Stadium; Winston-Salem, NC	W 30–23	22,300	
September 14	at Boston University*	Nickerson Field; Boston, MA	W 30–0	12,062	
September 21	NC State	Groves Stadium; Winston-Salem, NC (rivalry)	L 17–20	26,200	
September 28	Appalachian State*	Groves Stadium; Winston-Salem, NC	W 24–21	27,300	
October 5	at No. 16 Tennessee*	Neyland Stadium; Knoxville, TN	L 29–31	93,345	
October 12	at North Carolina	Kenan Memorial Stadium; Chapel Hill, NC (rivalry)	L 14–34	49,000	
October 19	Maryland	Groves Stadium; Winston-Salem, NC	L 3–26	23,700	
October 26	Virginia	Groves Stadium; Winston-Salem, NC	L 18–20	19,400	
November 2	at Clemson	Memorial Stadium; Clemson, SC	L 10–26	71,179	
November 9	Duke	Groves Stadium; Winston-Salem, NC (rivalry)	W 27–7	19,800	
November 16	at Georgia Tech	Grant Field; Atlanta, GA	L 10–41	28,575	
*Non-conference game; Rankings from AP Poll released prior to the game

== Team leaders ==
Category	Team Leader	Att/Cth	Yds
Passing	Foy White	132/210	1,322
Rushing	Topper Clemons	164	916
Receiving	Micheal Ramseur	54	450
