= 1985 Clemson Tigers football team =

American college football season

1985 Clemson Tigers football

Independence Bowl, L 13–20 vs. Minnesota
- Conference: Atlantic Coast Conference
- Record: 6–6 (4–3 ACC)
- Head coach: Danny Ford (7th full, 8th overall season)
- Offensive coordinator: Nelson Stokley (6th season)
- Captains: Steve Berlin; Steve Reese
- Home stadium: Memorial Stadium

1985 Atlantic Coast Conference football standings
	Conf.					Overall
Team	W		L		T	W		L		T
No. 18 Maryland $	6	–	0	–	0	9	–	3	–	0
No. 19 Georgia Tech	5	–	1	–	0	9	–	2	–	1
Virginia	4	–	3	–	0	6	–	5	–	0
Clemson	4	–	3	–	0	6	–	6	–	0
North Carolina	3	–	4	–	0	5	–	6	–	0
Duke	2	–	5	–	0	4	–	7	–	0
NC State	2	–	5	–	0	3	–	8	–	0
Wake Forest	1	–	6	–	0	4	–	7	–	0
$ – Conference champion; Rankings from AP Poll

The 1985 Clemson Tigers football team was an American football team that represented Clemson University in the Atlantic Coast Conference (ACC) during the 1985 NCAA Division I-A football season. In its eighth season under head coach Danny Ford, the team compiled a 6–6 record (4–3 against conference opponents), tied for third place in the ACC, lost to Minnesota in the 1985 Independence Bowl, and outscored opponents by a total of 244 to 222. The team played its home games at Memorial Stadium in Clemson, South Carolina.

Steve Berlin and Steve Reese were the team captains. The team's statistical leaders included quarterback Rodney Williams with 772 passing yards, Kenny Flowers with 1,200 rushing yards and 78 points scored (13 touchdowns), and Terrance Roulhac with 533 receiving yards.

== Schedule ==
Date	Time	Opponent	Site	TV	Result	Attendance	Source
September 14	1:00 p.m.	at Virginia Tech*	Lane Stadium; Blacksburg, VA		W 20–17	31,000	
September 21	3:30 p.m.	Georgia*	Memorial Stadium; Clemson, SC (rivalry)	CBS	L 13–20	80,473	
September 28	1:00 p.m.	Georgia Tech	Memorial Stadium; Clemson, SC (rivalry)		L 3–14	79,309	
October 5	7:30 p.m.	at Kentucky*	Commonwealth Stadium; Lexington, KY		L 7–26	58,230	
October 12	12:20 p.m.	Virginia^{†}	Memorial Stadium; Clemson, SC	Raycom	W 27–24	79,110	
October 19	1:30 p.m.	at Duke	Wallace Wade Stadium; Durham, NC		W 21–9	31,800	
October 26	1:00 p.m.	NC State	Memorial Stadium; Clemson, SC (Textile Bowl)		W 39–10	72,316	
November 2	1:00 p.m.	Wake Forest	Memorial Stadium; Clemson, SC		W 26–10	71,179	
November 9	12:20 p.m.	at North Carolina	Kenan Memorial Stadium; Chapel Hill, NC	Raycom	L 20–21	50,000	
November 16	2:30 p.m.	Maryland	Memorial Stadium; Clemson, SC	CBS	L 31–34	78,037	
November 23	1:30 p.m.	at South Carolina*	Williams–Brice Stadium; Columbia, SC (rivalry)		W 24–17	75,026	
December 21		vs. Minnesota*	Independence Stadium; Shreveport, LA (Independence Bowl)	Mizlou	L 13–20	42,800	
*Non-conference game; ^{†}Homecoming; All times are in Eastern time

== Personnel ==
1985 Clemson Tigers football team roster
Players
Coaches
Offense

Pos.	#	Name	Class
QB		Randy Anderson
WR		Shelton Boyer
WR		Pat Charleston
WR		Gary Cooper
OL		Frank Deiulis
RB		Stacey Driver
RB		Terrence Flagler
RB		Kenny Flowers
WR		Keith Jennings
RB		Tracy Johnson
RB		Chris Lancaster
OL		Jeff Lytton
OL		Wes Mann
OL		Eric Nix
OL		John Phillips
RB		Rod Quick
OL		Steve Reese (C)
TE		Jim Riggs
WR		Terrence Roulhac
RB		George Smith
RB		Richard Smith
OL		John Watson
WR		Ray Williams
QB	13	Rodney Williams	Fr

Defense

Pos.	#	Name	Class
DL		Steve Berlin (C)
DL		Lawrence Brunson
DB		Kenny Danforth
DL		Mark Drag
LB		James Earle
DB		Delton Hall
DB		A.J. Johnson
DL		Terence Mack
DL		Dwayne Meadows
DL		Michael Dean Perry
DL		Brian Raber
DB		Matt Riggs
LB		Henry Walls
LB		Keith Williams
DB		Perry Williams
DB		Donnell Woodford

Special teams

Pos.	#	Name	Class
P		Andy Newell
K		Adubarie Otorubio
K		David Treadwell
LS		Brian Hammond

Head coach

- Danny Ford

Coordinators/assistant coaches

- Nelson Stokley

Legend

- (C) Team captain
- (S) Suspended
- (I) Ineligible
- Injured
- Redshirt
