= 1985 North Carolina Tar Heels football team =

American college football season

1985 North Carolina Tar Heels football
- Conference: Atlantic Coast Conference
- Record: 5–6 (3–4 ACC)
- Head coach: Dick Crum (8th season)
- Captain: Carl Carr
- Home stadium: Kenan Memorial Stadium

1985 Atlantic Coast Conference football standings
	Conf.					Overall
Team	W		L		T	W		L		T
No. 18 Maryland $	6	–	0	–	0	9	–	3	–	0
No. 19 Georgia Tech	5	–	1	–	0	9	–	2	–	1
Virginia	4	–	3	–	0	6	–	5	–	0
Clemson	4	–	3	–	0	6	–	6	–	0
North Carolina	3	–	4	–	0	5	–	6	–	0
Duke	2	–	5	–	0	4	–	7	–	0
NC State	2	–	5	–	0	3	–	8	–	0
Wake Forest	1	–	6	–	0	4	–	7	–	0
$ – Conference champion; Rankings from AP Poll

The 1985 North Carolina Tar Heels football team represented the University of North Carolina at Chapel Hill during the 1985 NCAA Division I-A football season. The Tar Heels were led by eighth-year head coach Dick Crum and played their home games at Kenan Memorial Stadium in Chapel Hill, North Carolina. They competed as members of the Atlantic Coast Conference, finishing in fifth.

== Schedule ==
Date	Time	Opponent	Site	TV	Result	Attendance	Source
September 7	7:30 p.m.	at Navy*	Navy–Marine Corps Memorial Stadium; Annapolis, MD		W 21–19	26,394	
September 14	1:00 p.m.	No. 12 LSU*	Kenan Memorial Stadium; Chapel Hill, NC	TigerVision	L 13–23	50,866	
September 28	1:00 p.m.	VMI*	Kenan Memorial Stadium; Chapel Hill, NC		W 51–7	49,250	
October 5	12:15 p.m.	at Georgia Tech	Grant Field; Atlanta, GA	Raycom	L 0–31	35,625	
October 12	1:00 p.m.	Wake Forest	Kenan Memorial Stadium; Chapel Hill, NC (rivalry)		W 34–14	49,000	
October 19	12:15 p.m.	at NC State	Carter–Finley Stadium; Raleigh, NC (rivalry)		W 21–14	47,500	
October 26	1:00 p.m.	No. 11 Florida State*	Kenan Memorial Stadium; Chapel Hill, NC		L 10–20	50,132	
November 2	12:15 p.m.	at Maryland	Byrd Stadium; College Park, MD		L 10–28	49,800	
November 9	12:15 p.m.	Clemson	Kenan Memorial Stadium; Chapel Hill, NC		W 21–20	50,000	
November 16	1:00 p.m.	at Virginia	Scott Stadium; Charlottesville, VA (South's Oldest Rivalry)		L 22–24	38,500	
November 23	12:15 p.m.	Duke	Kenan Memorial Stadium; Chapel Hill, NC (Victory Bell)		L 21–23	48,500	
*Non-conference game; Rankings from AP Poll released prior to the game; All times are in Eastern time

== Game summaries ==
=== LSU ===
LSU at North Carolina

Team	1	2	3	4	Total
• No. 12 Tigers	7	6	3	7	23
Tar Heels	7	6	0	0	13

- Date: September 14
- Location:
  Kenan Memorial Stadium,
  Chapel Hill, North Carolina

Scoring summary
1	13:14	UNC	Brad Lopp 2-yard run (Lee Gliarmis kick)	UNC 7–0
1	4:04	LSU	Dalton Hilliard 1-yard run (Ron Lewis kick)	Tied 7–7
2		UNC	Brad Lopp 5-yard pass from Kevin Anthony (Gliarmis kick blocked)	UNC 13–7
2		LSU	Rogee Magee 12-yard pass from Jeff Wickersham (conversion failed)	Tied 13–13
3		LSU	Ron Lewis 54-yard field goal	LSU 16–13
4	12:20	LSU	Dalton Hilliard 3-yard run (Lewis kick)	LSU 23–13
