= Emmett Tilley =

American football player (born 1961)

No. 52
- Position: Linebacker

Personal information
- Born: February 13, 1961 (age 65); Durham, North Carolina, U.S.
- Listed height: 5 ft 11 in (1.80 m)
- Listed weight: 240 lb (109 kg)

Career information
- High school: Hillside (Durham)
- College: Duke (1979–1982)
- NFL draft: 1983: undrafted

Career history
- Miami Dolphins (1983); Buffalo Bills (1984)*; Jacksonville Bulls (1985)*
- * Offseason or practice squad member only
- Stats at Pro Football Reference

Emmett Tilley (born February 13, 1961) is an American former professional football linebacker who played for the Miami Dolphins of the National Football League (NFL). He played college football for the Duke Blue Devils.

== Early life ==
Emmett Tilley was born on February 13, 1961, in Durham, North Carolina. He attended Hillside High School in Durham.

== College career ==
Tilley enrolled at Duke University to play college football for the Blue Devils. He was a four-year letterman from 1979 to 1982. He led the team in tackles in 1981 with 164, the third-highest total in school history at the time (and still fourth-highest). Tilley recorded a career total of 405 tackles. The Durham Sun called him the "Incredible Hulk in royal blue" for his size.

== Professional career ==
After going undrafted in the 1983 NFL draft, Tilley signed with the Miami Dolphins on May 10, 1983. He was considered a longshot to make the team but impressed Dolphins head coach Don Shula after cutting in front of All-Pro Drew Pearson to intercept a Danny White pass during practice. The Miami Herald called Tilley a "sawed-off man with the legs that are so large that — although Tilley has a 34-inch waist — he must buy pants with a 38 or 40-inch waist to fit over his thighs". He played in six games for the Dolphins during the 1983 season before separating his shoulder and being placed on injured reserve. Tilley was waived by Miami on April 10, 1984.

Tilley was claimed off waivers by the Buffalo Bills on April 20, 1984. He was released on July 16, 1984, after failing a physical due to shoulder, back, and knee problems.

On October 5, 1984, Tilley signed with the Jacksonville Bulls of the United States Football League (USFL) for the 1985 USFL season. He left the team on February 2, 1985.

== See also ==
- Duke Blue Devils football statistical leaders
