= 1990 Wake Forest Demon Deacons football team =

American college football season

1990 Wake Forest Demon Deacons football
- Conference: Atlantic Coast Conference
- Record: 3–8 (0–7 ACC)
- Head coach: Bill Dooley (4th season)
- Defensive coordinator: Bob Brush (2nd season)
- Captains: Steve Brown; Mike Smith
- Home stadium: Groves Stadium

1990 Atlantic Coast Conference football standings
	Conf.					Overall
Team	W		L		T	W		L		T
No. 2 Georgia Tech $	6	–	0	–	1	11	–	0	–	1
No. 9 Clemson	5	–	2	–	0	10	–	2	–	0
No. 23 Virginia	5	–	2	–	0	8	–	4	–	0
Maryland	4	–	3	–	0	6	–	5	–	1
North Carolina	3	–	3	–	1	6	–	4	–	1
NC State	3	–	4	–	0	7	–	5	–	0
Duke	1	–	6	–	0	4	–	7	–	0
Wake Forest	0	–	7	–	0	3	–	8	–	0
$ – Conference champion; Rankings from AP Poll

The 1990 Wake Forest Demon Deacons football team was an American football team that represented Wake Forest University during the 1990 NCAA Division I-A football season. In their fourth season under head coach Bill Dooley, the Demon Deacons compiled a 3–8 record and finished in last place in the Atlantic Coast Conference.

== Schedule ==
Date	Time	Opponent	Site	TV	Result	Attendance	Source
September 1	7:00 pm	at Rice*	Rice Stadium; Houston, TX		L 17–33	27,100	
September 8	7:00 pm	Appalachian State*	Groves Stadium; Winston-Salem, NC		W 23–17	30,732	
September 15	12:00 pm	at NC State	Carter–Finley Stadium; Raleigh, NC (rivalry)	JPS	L 15–20	44,200	
September 29	1:00 pm	Army*	Groves Stadium; Winston-Salem, NC		W 52–14	20,117	
October 6	7:00 pm	North Carolina	Groves Stadium; Winston-Salem, NC (rivalry)		L 24–31	27,711	
October 13	12:00 pm	at Maryland	Byrd Stadium; College Park, MD		L 13–41	27,554	
October 20	1:00 pm	No. 1 Virginia	Groves Stadium; Winston-Salem, NC		L 14–49	23,124	
October 27	1:00 pm	No. 19 Clemson	Groves Stadium; Winston-Salem, NC		L 6–24	25,317	
November 3	1:30 pm	at Duke	Wallace Wade Stadium; Durham, NC (rivalry)		L 20–57	32,700	
November 17	1:00 pm	No. 4 Georgia Tech	Groves Stadium; Winston-Salem, NC		L 7–42	13,493	
November 24	2:00 pm	at Vanderbilt*	Vanderbilt Stadium; Nashville, TN		W 56–28	21,116	
*Non-conference game; Rankings from AP Poll released prior to the game; All times are in Eastern time

== Team leaders ==
Category	Team Leader	Att/Cth	Yds
Passing	Phil Barnhill	125/276	1,443
Rushing	Anthony Williams	181	866
Receiving	John Henry Mills	46	623
