= 1985 NC State Wolfpack football team =

American college football season

1985 NC State Wolfpack football
- Conference: Atlantic Coast Conference
- Record: 3–8 (2–5 ACC)
- Head coach: Tom Reed (3rd season)
- Home stadium: Carter Stadium

1985 Atlantic Coast Conference football standings
	Conf.					Overall
Team	W		L		T	W		L		T
No. 18 Maryland $	6	–	0	–	0	9	–	3	–	0
No. 19 Georgia Tech	5	–	1	–	0	9	–	2	–	1
Virginia	4	–	3	–	0	6	–	5	–	0
Clemson	4	–	3	–	0	6	–	6	–	0
North Carolina	3	–	4	–	0	5	–	6	–	0
Duke	2	–	5	–	0	4	–	7	–	0
NC State	2	–	5	–	0	3	–	8	–	0
Wake Forest	1	–	6	–	0	4	–	7	–	0
$ – Conference champion; Rankings from AP Poll

The 1985 NC State Wolfpack football team represented North Carolina State University during the 1985 NCAA Division I-A football season. The team's head coach was Tom Reed. NC State has been a member of the Atlantic Coast Conference (ACC) since the league's inception in 1953. The Wolfpack played its home games in 1985 at Carter–Finley Stadium in Raleigh, North Carolina, which has been NC State football's home stadium since 1966.

== Schedule ==
Date	Opponent	Site	TV	Result	Attendance	Source
September 7	East Carolina*	Carter–Finley Stadium; Raleigh, NC (rivalry)		L 14–33	58,300	
September 14	Georgia Tech	Carter–Finley Stadium; Raleigh, NC	Raycom	L 18–28	32,100	
September 21	at Wake Forest	Groves Stadium; Winston-Salem, NC (rivalry)		W 20–17	26,200	
September 28	No. 18 Furman*	Carter–Finley Stadium; Raleigh, NC		L 20–42	36,600	
October 5	Maryland	Carter–Finley Stadium; Raleigh, NC		L 17–31	29,500	
October 12	at Pittsburgh*	Pitt Stadium; Pittsburgh, PA	USA	L 10–24	36,609	
October 19	North Carolina	Carter–Finley Stadium; Raleigh, NC (rivalry)		L 14–21	47,500	
October 26	at Clemson	Memorial Stadium; Clemson, SC (Textile Bowl)		L 10–39	72,316	
November 2	at South Carolina*	Williams–Brice Stadium; Columbia, SC		W 21–17	69,100	
November 9	Virginia	Carter–Finley Stadium; Raleigh, NC		W 23–22	34,400	
November 16	at Duke	Wallace Wade Stadium; Durham, NC (rivalry)		L 19–31	16,200	
*Non-conference game; Rankings from NCAA Division I-AA Football Committee Poll released prior to the game
