= 1990 NC State Wolfpack football team =

American college football season

1990 NC State Wolfpack football

All-American Bowl, W 31–27 vs. Southern Miss
- Conference: Atlantic Coast Conference
- Record: 7–5 (3–4 ACC)
- Head coach: Dick Sheridan (5th season)
- Defensive coordinator: Buddy Green (1st season)
- Home stadium: Carter–Finley Stadium

1990 Atlantic Coast Conference football standings
	Conf.					Overall
Team	W		L		T	W		L		T
No. 2 Georgia Tech $	6	–	0	–	1	11	–	0	–	1
No. 9 Clemson	5	–	2	–	0	10	–	2	–	0
No. 23 Virginia	5	–	2	–	0	8	–	4	–	0
Maryland	4	–	3	–	0	6	–	5	–	1
North Carolina	3	–	3	–	1	6	–	4	–	1
NC State	3	–	4	–	0	7	–	5	–	0
Duke	1	–	6	–	0	4	–	7	–	0
Wake Forest	0	–	7	–	0	3	–	8	–	0
$ – Conference champion; Rankings from AP Poll

The 1990 NC State Wolfpack football team represented North Carolina State University during the 1990 NCAA Division I-A football season. The team's head coach was Dick Sheridan. NC State has been a member of the Atlantic Coast Conference (ACC) since the league's inception in 1953. The Wolfpack played its home games in 1990 at Carter–Finley Stadium in Raleigh, North Carolina, which has been NC State football's home stadium since 1966.

== Schedule ==
Date	Time	Opponent	Site	TV	Result	Attendance	Source
September 1		Western Carolina*	Carter–Finley Stadium; Raleigh, NC		W 67–0	42,700	
September 8	12:00 p.m.	at Georgia Tech	Bobby Dodd Stadium; Atlanta, GA	JPS	L 13–21	40,021	
September 15	12:00 p.m.	Wake Forest	Carter–Finley Stadium; Raleigh, NC (rivalry)	JPS	W 20–15	44,200	
September 22	12:00 p.m.	at Maryland	Byrd Stadium; College Park, MD		L 12–13	25,371	
September 29		at North Carolina	Kenan Memorial Stadium; Chapel Hill, NC (rivalry)		W 12–9	53,000	
October 6		Appalachian State*	Carter–Finley Stadium; Raleigh, NC		W 56–0	46,000	
October 13	1:00 p.m.	at No. 2 Virginia	Scott Stadium; Charlottesville, VA		L 0–31	44,300	
October 20	12:00 p.m.	No. 22 Clemson	Carter–Finley Stadium; Raleigh, NC (Textile Bowl)	JPS	L 17–24	46,500	
October 27	1:00 p.m.	South Carolina*	Carter–Finley Stadium; Raleigh, NC		W 38–29	45,800	
November 3	1:00 p.m.	at Virginia Tech*	Lane Stadium; Blacksburg, VA		L 16–20	38,622	
November 10		Duke	Carter–Finley Stadium; Raleigh, NC (rivalry)		W 16–0	36,800	
December 28		vs. No. 23 Southern Miss*	Legion Field; Birmingham, AL (All-American Bowl)		W 31–27	44,000	
*Non-conference game; Rankings from AP Poll released prior to the game; All times are in Eastern time

== Team players drafted into the NFL ==
Player	Position	Round	Pick	NFL club
Mike Jones	Defensive end	2	32	Phoenix Cardinals
Jesse Campbell	Defensive back	2	48	Philadelphia Eagles
Joe Johnson	Defensive back	4	105	Chicago Bears
Fernandus Vinson	Defensive back	7	184	Cincinnati Bengals
Elijah Austin	Defensive tackle	12	308	Cleveland Browns
