= 1985 Virginia Cavaliers football team =

American college football season

1985 Virginia Cavaliers football
- Conference: Atlantic Coast Conference
- Record: 6–5 (4–3 ACC)
- Head coach: George Welsh (4th season)
- Captains: Jim Dombrowski; Charles McDaniel; Antonio Rice
- Home stadium: Scott Stadium

1985 Atlantic Coast Conference football standings
	Conf.					Overall
Team	W		L		T	W		L		T
No. 18 Maryland $	6	–	0	–	0	9	–	3	–	0
No. 19 Georgia Tech	5	–	1	–	0	9	–	2	–	1
Virginia	4	–	3	–	0	6	–	5	–	0
Clemson	4	–	3	–	0	6	–	6	–	0
North Carolina	3	–	4	–	0	5	–	6	–	0
Duke	2	–	5	–	0	4	–	7	–	0
NC State	2	–	5	–	0	3	–	8	–	0
Wake Forest	1	–	6	–	0	4	–	7	–	0
$ – Conference champion; Rankings from AP Poll

The 1985 Virginia Cavaliers football team represented the University of Virginia during the 1985 NCAA Division I-A football season. The Cavaliers were led by fourth-year head coach George Welsh and played their home games at Scott Stadium in Charlottesville, Virginia. They competed as members of the Atlantic Coast Conference, finishing tied for third.

== Schedule ==
Date	Time	Opponent	Rank	Site	TV	Result	Attendance	Source
September 14	7:00 p.m.	VMI*		Scott Stadium; Charlottesville, VA		W 40–15	37,500	
September 21	1:00 p.m.	at Georgia Tech		Grant Field; Atlanta, GA		W 24–13	38,291	
September 28	12:20 p.m.	Navy*^{†}	No. 20	Scott Stadium; Charlottesville, VA	JPS	L 13–17	44,000	
October 5	7:00 p.m.	Duke		Scott Stadium; Charlottesville, VA		W 37–14	41,500	
October 12	12:20 p.m.	at Clemson		Memorial Stadium; Clemson, SC	JPS	L 24–27	78,000	
October 19	1:00 p.m.	Virginia Tech*		Scott Stadium; Charlottesville, VA (rivalry)		L 10–28	44,500	
October 26	12:20 p.m.	at Wake Forest		Groves Stadium; Winston-Salem, NC	JPS	W 20–18	19,400	
November 2	8:05 p.m.	West Virginia*		Scott Stadium; Charlottesville, VA	TBS	W 27–7	35,000	
November 9	12:15 p.m.	at NC State		Carter–Finley Stadium; Raleigh, NC		L 22–23	34,400	
November 16	1:00 p.m.	North Carolina		Scott Stadium; Charlottesville, VA (South's Oldest Rivalry)		W 24–22	38,500	
November 29	2:30 p.m.	at Maryland		Byrd Stadium; College Park, MD (rivalry)	CBS	L 21–33	48,950	
*Non-conference game; ^{†}Homecoming; Rankings from AP Poll released prior to the game

== Personnel ==
1985 Virginia Cavaliers football team roster
Players
Coaches
Offense

Pos.	#	Name	Class
OT	73	Jim Dombrowski	Sr
QB	1	Don Majkowski	Jr
QB	10	Scott Secules	So
RB	4	Barry Word	Sr
WR	84	Geno Zimmerlink	Sr

Defense

Pos.	#	Name	Class
DT	97	Rayotis Perkins	Jr
LB	51	Russ Swan	Sr

Special teams

Pos.	#	Name	Class

Head coach

- George Welsh

Coordinators/assistant coaches

Legend

- (C) Team captain
- (S) Suspended
- (I) Ineligible
- Injured
- Redshirt
