= Vincent Anthony Jr. =

American football player (born 2004)

Columbus Aviators
- Position: Defensive end
- Roster status: Unsigned draft pick

Personal information
- Born: April 26, 2004 (age 22)
- Listed height: 6 ft 6 in (1.98 m)
- Listed weight: 258 lb (117 kg)

Career information
- High school: Charles E. Jordan (Durham, North Carolina)
- College: Duke (2022–2025)
- NFL draft: 2026: undrafted

Career history
- Kansas City Chiefs (2026)*; San Francisco 49ers (2026)*; Columbus Aviators (2027-present)
- * Offseason or practice squad member only
- Stats at Pro Football Reference

Vincent Anthony Jr. (born April 26, 2004) is an American professional football defensive end. He played college football for the Duke Blue Devils.

== Early life ==
Anthony Jr. attended Charles E. Jordan High School in Durham, North Carolina. Over his junior and senior seasons he combined for 127 tackles and 19 sacks. Anthony Jr. was selected to play in the 2022 All-American Bowl. He committed to play college football at Duke University.

== College career ==
Anthony Jr. started 12 of 13 games his true freshman year at Duke in 2022 and had 28 tackles and 0.5 sacks. As a sophomore in 2023, he started four of 11 games, recording 17 tackles with two sacks and as a junior in 2024, started all 12 he played in, finishing with 25 tackles and five sacks. Anthony Jr. returned to Duke for his senior season in 2025.

== Professional career ==
Pre-draft measurables
Height	Weight	Arm length	Hand span	Wingspan	40-yard dash	10-yard split	20-yard split	20-yard shuttle	Three-cone drill	Vertical jump	Broad jump	Bench press
6 ft 5 5/8 in (1.97 m)	258 lb (117 kg)	34 1/8 in (0.87 m)	10 in (0.25 m)	6 ft 11 1/8 in (2.11 m)	4.83 s	1.56 s	2.78 s	4.53 s	7.14 s	32.5 in (0.83 m)	10 ft 3 in (3.12 m)	15 reps
All values from NFL Combine/Pro Day

=== Kansas City Chiefs ===
After going undrafted in the 2026 NFL draft, Anthony signed with the Kansas City Chiefs as an undrafted free agent. On August 30, he was waived by Kansas City as a part of final roster cuts.

=== San Francisco 49ers ===
On September 1, 2026, Anthony signed with the San Francisco 49ers' practice squad. On September 29, 2026, he was released.
