= Eron Riley =

American gridiron football player (born 1987)

No. 19, 15
- Position: Wide receiver

Personal information
- Born: August 5, 1987 (age 39); Savannah, Georgia, U.S.
- Listed height: 6 ft 3 in (1.91 m)
- Listed weight: 207 lb (94 kg)

Career information
- College: Duke
- NFL draft: 2009: undrafted

Career history
- Baltimore Ravens (2009–2010)*; Carolina Panthers (2010)*; Denver Broncos (2010–2011)*; New York Jets (2011); Saskatchewan Roughriders (2013–2014)
- * Offseason or practice squad member only

Awards and highlights
- 2× Second-team All-ACC (2007, 2008)

Career NFL statistics
- Games played: 1
- Stats at Pro Football Reference
- Stats at CFL.ca (archive)

Eron Riley (born August 5, 1987) is an American former professional football player who was a wide receiver in the National Football League (NFL) and Canadian Football League (CFL). He played college football for the Duke Blue Devils and was signed by the Baltimore Ravens as an undrafted free agent in 2009.

Riley was also a member of the Carolina Panthers, Denver Broncos, New York Jets, and Saskatchewan Roughriders.

== Professional career ==
=== Baltimore Ravens ===
Eron Riley was signed by the Baltimore Ravens as an undrafted free agent. Riley was released by the Baltimore Ravens on September 4, 2010 after not playing in a regular season game.

=== Carolina Panthers ===
Riley was signed to the Carolina Panthers' practice squad on October 11, 2010. Riley was released five days later.

=== Denver Broncos ===
The Denver Broncos signed Riley to the team's practice squad on October 19, 2010.

=== New York Jets ===
The New York Jets signed Riley to their active roster on October 19, 2011. He was released by the Jets on December 28. Riley was signed to the team's practice squad the next day. Riley was waived on August 31, 2012.

=== Saskatchewan Roughriders ===
On April 19, 2013, it was announced Riley was signed by the Saskatchewan Roughriders of the CFL. He was released by the Roughriders on October 21, 2014.
