= Steve Jones (American football) =

American football player (born 1951)

No. 46, 34
- Position: Running back

Personal information
- Born: March 6, 1951 (age 75); Sanford, North Carolina, U.S.
- Listed height: 6 ft 0 in (1.83 m)
- Listed weight: 200 lb (91 kg)

Career information
- College: Duke
- NFL draft: 1973: 5th round, 129 (By the Los Angeles Rams)th overall pick

Career history
- Buffalo Bills (1973–1974); St. Louis Cardinals (1974–1978)

Awards and highlights
- Third-team All-American (1972); ACC Player of the Year (1972); First-team All-ACC (1972)

Career NFL statistics
- Rushing attempts–yards: 299–1,204
- Receptions–yards: 87–629
- Touchdowns: 17
- Stats at Pro Football Reference

Steven Hunter Jones (born March 6, 1951) is an American former professional football player who was a running back in the National Football League (NFL) in the 1970s.

After playing college football for the Duke Blue Devils, earning Atlantic Coast Conference (ACC) player of the year honors in his senior year. He played six seasons in the NFL. He was selected 129th overall by the Los Angeles Rams in the fifth round of the 1973 NFL draft, then briefly acquired by the St. Louis Cardinals before being picked up by the Buffalo Bills, where he played behind O. J. Simpson. He then moved back to the Cardinals where he played from 1974 to 1978. Jones was primarily used on special teams but also excelled in short yardage situations at the running back position. He scored 17 touchdowns and averaged 4.0 yards per carry in his NFL career.
