= 1985 Duke Blue Devils football team =

American college football season

1985 Duke Blue Devils football
- Conference: Atlantic Coast Conference
- Record: 4–7 (2–5 ACC)
- Head coach: Steve Sloan (3rd season)
- Offensive coordinator: Tommy Bowden (1st season)
- Defensive coordinator: Richard Bell (3rd season)
- MVP: Harry Ward
- Captains: Pete Stubbs; Nick Buoniconti; Mike Higginbotham; Harry Ward
- Home stadium: Wallace Wade Stadium

1985 Atlantic Coast Conference football standings
| | Conf. | | | | | Overall |
| Team | W | | L | | T | W | | L | | T |
|---|---|---|---|---|---|---|---|---|---|---|
| No. 18 Maryland $ | 6 | – | 0 | – | 0 | 9 | – | 3 | – | 0 |
| No. 19 Georgia Tech | 5 | – | 1 | – | 0 | 9 | – | 2 | – | 1 |
| Virginia | 4 | – | 3 | – | 0 | 6 | – | 5 | – | 0 |
| Clemson | 4 | – | 3 | – | 0 | 6 | – | 6 | – | 0 |
| North Carolina | 3 | – | 4 | – | 0 | 5 | – | 6 | – | 0 |
| Duke | 2 | – | 5 | – | 0 | 4 | – | 7 | – | 0 |
| NC State | 2 | – | 5 | – | 0 | 3 | – | 8 | – | 0 |
| Wake Forest | 1 | – | 6 | – | 0 | 4 | – | 7 | – | 0 |
$ – Conference champion; Rankings from AP Poll

The 1985 Duke Blue Devils football team represented Duke University as a member of the Atlantic Coast Conference (ACC) during the 1985 NCAA Division I-A football season. Led by third-year head coach Steve Sloan, the Blue Devils compiled an overall record of 4–7 with a mark of 2–5 in conference play, tying for sixth place in the ACC. Duke played home games at Wallace Wade Stadium in Durham, North Carolina.

== Schedule ==
| Date | Opponent | Site | Result | Attendance | Source |
|---|---|---|---|---|---|
| September 7 | Northwestern* | Wallace Wade Stadium; Durham, NC | W 40–17 | 21,000 | |
| September 14 | at West Virginia* | Mountaineer Field; Morgantown, WV | L 18–20 | 61,191 | |
| September 21 | Ohio* | Wallace Wade Stadium; Durham, NC | W 34–13 | 18,150 | |
| October 5 | at Virginia | Scott Stadium; Charlottesville, VA | L 14–37 | 41,500 | |
| October 12 | at South Carolina* | Williams–Brice Stadium; Columbia, SC | L 7–28 | 71,150 | |
| October 19 | Clemson | Wallace Wade Stadium; Durham, NC | L 9–21 | 31,800 | |
| October 26 | at Maryland | Byrd Stadium; College Park, MD | L 10–40 | 46,175 | |
| November 2 | Georgia Tech^{†} | Wallace Wade Stadium; Durham, NC | L 0–9 | 14,400 | |
| November 9 | at Wake Forest | Groves Stadium; Winston-Salem, NC (rivalry) | L 7–27 | 19,800 | |
| November 16 | NC State | Wallace Wade Stadium; Durham, NC (rivalry) | W 31–19 | 16,200 | |
| November 23 | at North Carolina | Kenan Memorial Stadium; Chapel Hill, NC (Victory Bell) | W 23–21 | 48,500 | |
*Non-conference game; ^{†}Homecoming
