= Randy Cuthbert =

American football player (born 1970)

No. 42
- Position: HB

Personal information
- Born: January 16, 1970 (age 56); Lansdale, Pennsylvania, U.S.

Career information
- College: Duke
- NFL draft: 1993: undrafted

Career history
- Pittsburgh Steelers (1993–1994); Carolina Panthers (1995)*
- * Offseason or practice squad member only

Awards and highlights
- First-team All-ACC (1989); 2× Second-team All-ACC (1990, 1992); ACC Brian Piccolo Award (1992)

Career NFL statistics
- Rushing Att. / Yds.: 1 / 7
- Receptions / Yds.: 1 / 3
- Touchdowns: 0
- Stats at Pro Football Reference

Randy Alan Cuthbert (born January 16, 1970) is an American former professional football player who was a running back for two seasons in the National Football League (NFL). He played college football for the Duke Blue Devils. He was born in Lansdale, Pennsylvania. He played in the NFL for the Pittsburgh Steelers from 1993 to 1994. His only NFL carry, a rush for seven yards against the Buffalo Bills during a Monday Night Football game, was telecast as an overhead shot from the Goodyear Blimp, making him the only player in history to have his only rush televised in that manner.

Cuthbert was named the head football coach at Emmaus High School on May 14, 2013, and he served until November 20, 2015, when he was hired as athletic director for Wissahickon High School.
