= Conner Vernon =

American football player (born 1990)

Profile
- Position: Wide receiver

Personal information
- Born: August 18, 1990 (age 36); Miami, Florida, U.S.
- Listed height: 6 ft 1 in (1.85 m)
- Listed weight: 200 lb (91 kg)

Career information
- High school: Miami (FL) Gulliver Preparatory
- College: Duke
- NFL draft: 2013: undrafted

Career history
- Oakland Raiders (2013)*; Cleveland Browns (2013–2014)*; Cincinnati Bengals (2014)*; Detroit Lions (2014)*
- * Offseason or practice squad member only

Awards and highlights
- 3× Second-Team All-ACC (2010, 2011, 2012)
- Stats at Pro Football Reference

Conner Vernon (born August 18, 1990) is an American former professional football wide receiver. He was signed by the Oakland Raiders as an undrafted free agent in 2013 and spent time on the Cleveland Browns' practice squad, the Cincinnati Bengals and the Detroit Lions. He played college football at Duke.

== Early life ==
Conner attended Gulliver Preparatory School in Miami, Florida. He was a three-year letterman at Gulliver Prep under coach Earl Sims. As a senior, he caught 60 passes for 1,163 yards and 11 touchdowns to earn first-team all-state honors, he also led the Miami area in receiving yards in 2008 while helping Gulliver to a 12-2 record and berth in the Florida 2A state title game. He had 131 career catches for 2,668 yards and 22 touchdowns. He also lettered in track and field. Considered a three-star recruit by Rivals.com, he accepted a scholarship offer from Duke over offers from Vanderbilt, Troy and Wake Forest.

== College career ==
As a freshman, he played in all 11, starting the final eight games. He caught 55 passes for 746 yards and three touchdowns, and also returned 12 kickoffs for 295 yards (24.6 avg). The following season, he started all 12 games, in which he caught 73 passes for 946 yards and four touchdowns. He also rushed five times for 40 yards and returned six kickoffs for 143 yards and a 23.8 yards per return average and he earned second-team all-conference honours. In his junior season, he started all 12 games, in which he caught 70 passes for 956 yards and six touchdowns. He became the first player in ACC history to post multiple seasons with 70+ catches. He also earned second-team all-conference honours. As a senior, he started in all 13 games, in which he caught 85 passes for 1,074 yards and eight TD's. He set a Duke Blue Devils record for career receiving yards with 3,749. He earned second-team all-conference honors for the third consecutive season and third time in his career.

== Professional career ==
Pre-draft measurables
Height	Weight	Arm length	Hand span	40-yard dash	20-yard shuttle	Three-cone drill	Vertical jump	Broad jump
6 ft 0 in (1.83 m)	196 lb (89 kg)	30.5 in (0.77 m)	9.25 in (0.23 m)	4.68 s	4.22 s	6.93 s	32.5 in (0.83 m)	10 ft 5 in (3.18 m)
All values from NFL Combine

Vernon signed with the Oakland Raiders after going undrafted in the 2013 NFL draft. Vernon was cut by the Raiders following the preseason but was signed to the Cleveland Browns' practice squad before Week 17 of the regular season. Vernon was waived by the Browns during training camp in July 2014 and quickly claimed by the Cincinnati Bengals. Vernon was waived by the Bengals on August 8, 2014.

Vernon was claimed off waivers by the Detroit Lions on August 11, 2014. The Lions released Vernon on August 23.
