= Anthony Boone (gridiron football) =

American gridiron football player (born 1991)

No. 7
- Position: Quarterback

Personal information
- Born: October 29, 1991 (age 35); Weddington, North Carolina, U.S.
- Listed height: 6 ft 0 in (1.83 m)
- Listed weight: 225 lb (102 kg)

Career information
- College: Duke

Career history
- 2015: Detroit Lions*
- 2015: Montreal Alouettes
- * Offseason or practice squad member only
- Stats at CFL.ca (archive)

Anthony Boone Jr. (born October 29, 1991) is an American former professional football quarterback. He played college football at Duke.

== College career ==
Boone attended Duke University from 2010 to 2014. He redshirted for his initial season in 2010. In 2011, he got his first snaps at QB backing up starter Sean Renfree, running for 6 yards on 2 attempts in a loss to FCS team Richmond, 23-21. Boone would throw his first career touchdown pass in the season finale at North Carolina. During his career he played in 46 games and made 25 starts. He finished with 5,789 passing yards and 38 touchdowns.

== Professional career ==
After he was not selected in the 2015 NFL draft, Boone signed with the Detroit Lions as an undrafted free agent. He was released by the Lions in June.

Boone signed with the Montreal Alouettes of the Canadian Football League in July 2015. He dressed in nine games for the Alouettes in 2015, completing 18 of 31 passes for 198 yards, two touchdowns, and two interceptions while also scoring a rushing touchdown.
