= 1985 Maryland Terrapins football team =

American college football season

1985 Maryland Terrapins football

ACC champion Cherry Bowl champion

Cherry Bowl, W 35–18 vs. Syracuse
- Conference: Atlantic Coast Conference

Ranking
- Coaches: No. 19
- AP: No. 18
- Record: 9–3 (6–0 ACC)
- Head coach: Bobby Ross (4th season)
- Offensive coordinator: Ralph Friedgen (4th season)
- Defensive coordinator: Gib Romaine (4th season)
- Home stadium: Byrd Stadium

1985 Atlantic Coast Conference football standings
	Conf.					Overall
Team	W		L		T	W		L		T
No. 18 Maryland $	6	–	0	–	0	9	–	3	–	0
No. 19 Georgia Tech	5	–	1	–	0	9	–	2	–	1
Virginia	4	–	3	–	0	6	–	5	–	0
Clemson	4	–	3	–	0	6	–	6	–	0
North Carolina	3	–	4	–	0	5	–	6	–	0
Duke	2	–	5	–	0	4	–	7	–	0
NC State	2	–	5	–	0	3	–	8	–	0
Wake Forest	1	–	6	–	0	4	–	7	–	0
$ – Conference champion; Rankings from AP Poll

The 1985 Maryland Terrapins football team represented University of Maryland in the 1985 NCAA Division I-A football season. The Terrapins offense scored 326 points while the defense allowed 192 points. Led by head coach Bobby Ross, the Terrapins appeared in the Cherry Bowl.

== Schedule ==
Date	Opponent	Rank	Site	Result	Attendance	Source
September 7	No. 19 Penn State*	No. 7	Byrd Stadium; College Park, MD (rivalry)	L 18–20	50,750	
September 14	at Boston College*	No. 17	Sullivan Stadium; Foxboro, MA	W 31–13	30,210	
September 21	West Virginia*	No. 17	Byrd Stadium; College Park, MD (rivalry)	W 28–0	51,250	
September 28	at No. 12 Michigan*	No. 17	Michigan Stadium; Ann Arbor, MI	L 0–20	105,282	
October 5	at NC State		Carter–Finley Stadium; Raleigh, NC	W 31–7	29,500	
October 19	at Wake Forest		Groves Stadium; Winston-Salem, NC	W 26–3	23,700	
October 26	Duke		Byrd Stadium; College Park, MD	W 40–10	46,175	
November 2	North Carolina^{†}		Byrd Stadium; College Park, MD	W 28–10	49,800	
November 9	No. 8 Miami (FL)*		Memorial Stadium; Baltimore, MD	L 22–29	62,350	
November 16	at Clemson		Memorial Stadium; Clemson, SC	W 34–31	78,037	
November 29	Virginia		Byrd Stadium; College Park, MD (rivalry)	W 33–21	48,950	
December 21	vs. Syracuse*	No. 20	Pontiac Silverdome; Pontiac, MI (Cherry Bowl)	W 35–18	51,858	
*Non-conference game; ^{†}Homecoming; Rankings from AP Poll released prior to the game

== Game summaries ==
=== Penn State ===
Penn State at Maryland

Team	1	2	3	4	Total
• Nittany Lions	10	7	3	0	20
Terrapins	0	10	8	0	18

- Date: September 7
- Location: Byrd Stadium, College Park, MD
- Game attendance: 50,750

Scoring summary
1		PSU	Zordich 32-yard interception return (Manca kick)	PSU 7–0
1		PSU	Manca 28-yard field goal	PSU 10–0
2		PSU	Williams 2-yard pass from Shaffer (Manca kick)	PSU 17–0
2		MD	Paredes 22-yard field goal	PSU 17–3
2		MD	Badanjek 8-yard run (Paredes kick)	PSU 17–10
3		MD	Badanjek 5-yard run (Knight pass from Henning)	MD 18–17
3	9:46	PSU	Manca 46-yard field goal	PSU 20–18

=== At Michigan ===
Maryland at Michigan

Team	1	2	3	4	Total
Terrapins	0	0	0	0	0
• Wolverines	3	7	7	3	20

- Date: September 28
- Location: Michigan Stadium, Ann Arbor, MI
- Game attendance: 105,282

=== Vs. Syracuse (Cherry Bowl) ===
Syracuse vs. Maryland

Team	1	2	3	4	Total
Orangemen	3	7	8	0	18
• Terrapins	6	22	7	0	35

- Date: December 21
- Location: Pontiac Silverdome, Pontiac, MI
- Game attendance: 51,858
- Game weather: Indoors
- TV announcers (Mizlou): Ray Lane and Jim Brandstatter

== Roster ==
1985 Maryland Terrapins football team roster
Players
Coaches
Offense

Pos.	#	Name	Class
RB	40	Rick Badanjek	Sr
RB	33	Alvin Blount	Jr
QB	8	Stan Gelbaugh	Sr
OT	73	J. D. Maarleveld	Sr

Defense

Pos.	#	Name	Class

Special teams

Pos.	#	Name	Class

Head coach

- Bobby Ross

Coordinators/assistant coaches

Legend

- (C) Team captain
- (S) Suspended
- (I) Ineligible
- Injured
- Redshirt

== 1986 NFL draft ==
The following players were selected in the 1986 NFL draft.

Player	Position	Round	Overall	NFL team
J.D. Maarleveld	Tackle	5	112	Tampa Bay Buccaneers
Donald Brown	Defensive back	5	129	San Diego Chargers
Stan Gelbaugh	Quarterback	6	150	Dallas Cowboys
Rick Badanjek	Running back	7	186	Washington Redskins
George Colton	Guard	9	248	New England Patriots
Len Lynch	Guard	11	295	New York Giants
