= 1990 Duke Blue Devils football team =

American college football season

1990 Duke Blue Devils football
- Conference: Atlantic Coast Conference
- Record: 4–7 (1–6 ACC)
- Head coach: Barry Wilson (1st season)
- Offensive coordinator: Eddie Wilson (1st season)
- Defensive coordinator: Dale Strahm (1st season)
- MVP: Erwin Sampson
- Captains: Randy Jones; Chip Nitowski; Erwin Sampson; Mike Urso
- Home stadium: Wallace Wade Stadium

1990 Atlantic Coast Conference football standings
	Conf.					Overall
Team	W		L		T	W		L		T
No. 2 Georgia Tech $	6	–	0	–	1	11	–	0	–	1
No. 9 Clemson	5	–	2	–	0	10	–	2	–	0
No. 23 Virginia	5	–	2	–	0	8	–	4	–	0
Maryland	4	–	3	–	0	6	–	5	–	1
North Carolina	3	–	3	–	1	6	–	4	–	1
NC State	3	–	4	–	0	7	–	5	–	0
Duke	1	–	6	–	0	4	–	7	–	0
Wake Forest	0	–	7	–	0	3	–	8	–	0
$ – Conference champion; Rankings from AP Poll

The 1990 Duke Blue Devils football team represented Duke University as a member of the Atlantic Coast Conference (ACC) during the 1990 NCAA Division I-A football season. Led by first-year head coach Barry Wilson, the Blue Devils compiled an overall record of 4–7 with a mark of 1–6 in conference play, and finished seventh in the ACC. Duke played home games at Wallace Wade Stadium in Durham, North Carolina.

== Schedule ==
Date	Time	Opponent	Site	TV	Result	Attendance	Source
September 1	7:00 p.m.	at South Carolina*	Williams–Brice Stadium; Columbia, SC		L 10–21	71,606	
September 15		at Northwestern*	Dyche Stadium; Evanston, IL		W 27–24	28,177	
September 22		No. 10 Virginia	Wallace Wade Stadium; Durham, NC	JPS	L 0–59	24,862	
September 29	12:00 p.m.	at No. 19 Clemson	Memorial Stadium; Clemson, SC	JPS	L 7–26	81,066	
October 6		at Army*	Michie Stadium; West Point, NY		W 17–16	41,014	
October 13		Western Carolina*	Wallace Wade Stadium; Durham, NC		W 49–18	15,700	
October 20		Maryland	Wallace Wade Stadium; Durham, NC		L 20–23	23,200	
October 27	12:00 p.m.	at No. 16 Georgia Tech	Bobby Dodd Stadium; Atlanta, GA	JPS	L 31–48	44,061	
November 3		Wake Forest^{†}	Wallace Wade Stadium; Durham, NC (rivalry)		W 57–20	32,700	
November 10		at NC State	Carter–Finley Stadium; Raleigh, NC (rivalry)		L 0–16	36,800	
November 17		North Carolina	Wallace Wade Stadium; Durham, NC (Victory Bell)		L 22–24	31,600	
*Non-conference game; ^{†}Homecoming; Rankings from AP Poll released prior to the game; All times are in Eastern time
