= Billy Granville =

American football player (born 1974)

Profile
- Position: Linebacker

Personal information
- Born: March 12, 1974 (age 52); Trenton, New Jersey, U.S.
- Listed height: 6 ft 3 in (1.91 m)
- Listed weight: 252 lb (114 kg)

Career information
- High school: Lawrenceville School
- College: Duke
- NFL draft: 1997: undrafted

Career history
- Cincinnati Bengals (1997–2000); Houston Texans (2002)*
- * Offseason or practice squad member only

Awards and highlights
- Second-team All-ACC (1994)
- Stats at Pro Football Reference

Billy Granville (born March 12, 1974) is an American former professional football player who was a linebacker for the Cincinnati Bengals of the National Football League (NFL). He played college football for the Duke Blue Devils.
