= Chris Combs (defensive lineman) =

American football player (born 1976)

No. 73, 96
- Position: Defensive lineman

Personal information
- Born: December 15, 1976 (age 49); Roanoke, Virginia, U.S.
- Listed height: 6 ft 4 in (1.93 m)
- Listed weight: 284 lb (129 kg)

Career information
- High school: Patrick Henry (Roanoke)
- College: Duke
- NFL draft: 2000: 6th round, 173rd overall pick

Career history
- Pittsburgh Steelers (2000–2001); Jacksonville Jaguars (2002)

Awards and highlights
- 2× First-team All-ACC (1998, 1999); Second-team All-ACC (1997)

Career NFL statistics
- Games played: 10
- Stats at Pro Football Reference

Christopher Brandon Combs (born December 15, 1976) is an American former professional football player who was a defensive lineman in the National Football League (NFL) for the Pittsburgh Steelers and Jacksonville Jaguars. He played college football for the Duke Blue Devils and was selected by the Steelers in the sixth round of the 2000 NFL draft with the 173rd overall pick.
