= Thad Lewis =

American football player and coach (born 1987)

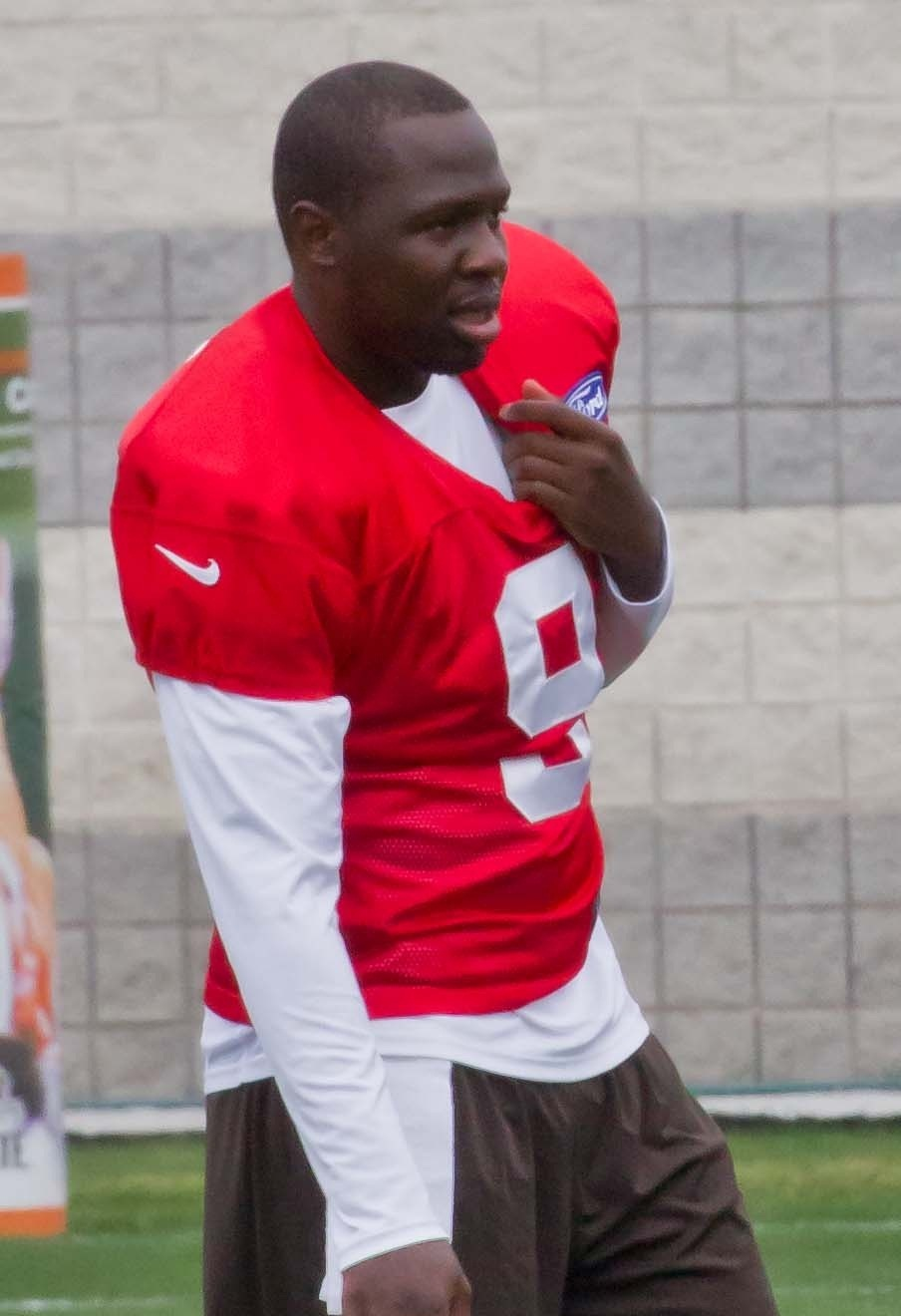
- Lewis with the Cleveland Browns in 2012

No. 9
- Position: Quarterback

Personal information
- Born: November 19, 1987 (age 38); Opa-locka, Florida, U.S.
- Listed height: 6 ft 2 in (1.88 m)
- Listed weight: 219 lb (99 kg)

Career information
- High school: Hialeah-Miami Lakes (Hialeah, Florida)
- College: Duke (2006–2009)
- NFL draft: 2010: undrafted

Career history

Playing
- St. Louis Rams (2010); Cleveland Browns (2011–2012); Detroit Lions (2013)*; Buffalo Bills (2013); Houston Texans (2014); Cleveland Browns (2015)*; Philadelphia Eagles (2015); San Francisco 49ers (2016); Baltimore Ravens (2017)*
- * Offseason or practice squad member only

Coaching
- UCLA (2018–2019) Offensive analyst; Tampa Bay Buccaneers (2020) Intern; Tampa Bay Buccaneers (2021–2022) Assistant wide receivers coach; Tampa Bay Buccaneers (2023–2025) Quarterbacks coach

Awards and highlights
- 2× Second-team All-ACC (2008, 2009)

Career NFL statistics
- Passing attempts: 189
- Passing completions: 115
- Completion percentage: 60.8%
- TD–INT: 5–4
- Passing yards: 1,296
- Passer rating: 81.4
- Stats at Pro Football Reference

Thaddeus Cowan Lewis (born November 19, 1987) is an American football coach and former quarterback who was most recently the quarterbacks coach for the Tampa Bay Buccaneers of the National Football League (NFL). He played college football for the Duke Blue Devils.

Lewis was in the NFL for eight years where he spent almost his entire career as a backup, practice squad or offseason player for eight different teams. He played in 7 total regular season games, including six starts: one for the Cleveland Browns in 2012 and five for the Buffalo Bills in 2013.

He began his coaching career in 2018, and joined the Buccaneers' coaching staff in 2020.

== Early life ==
Thaddeus Cowan Lewis was born on November 19, 1987, in Opa-locka, Florida. Lewis played high school football at Hialeah-Miami Lakes High School. As a senior, he was evaluated as the nation's 10th-best dual-threat quarterback and 65th-best quarterback overall. He led his team to the state playoffs that year, passing for 12 touchdowns and only three interceptions.

== College career ==
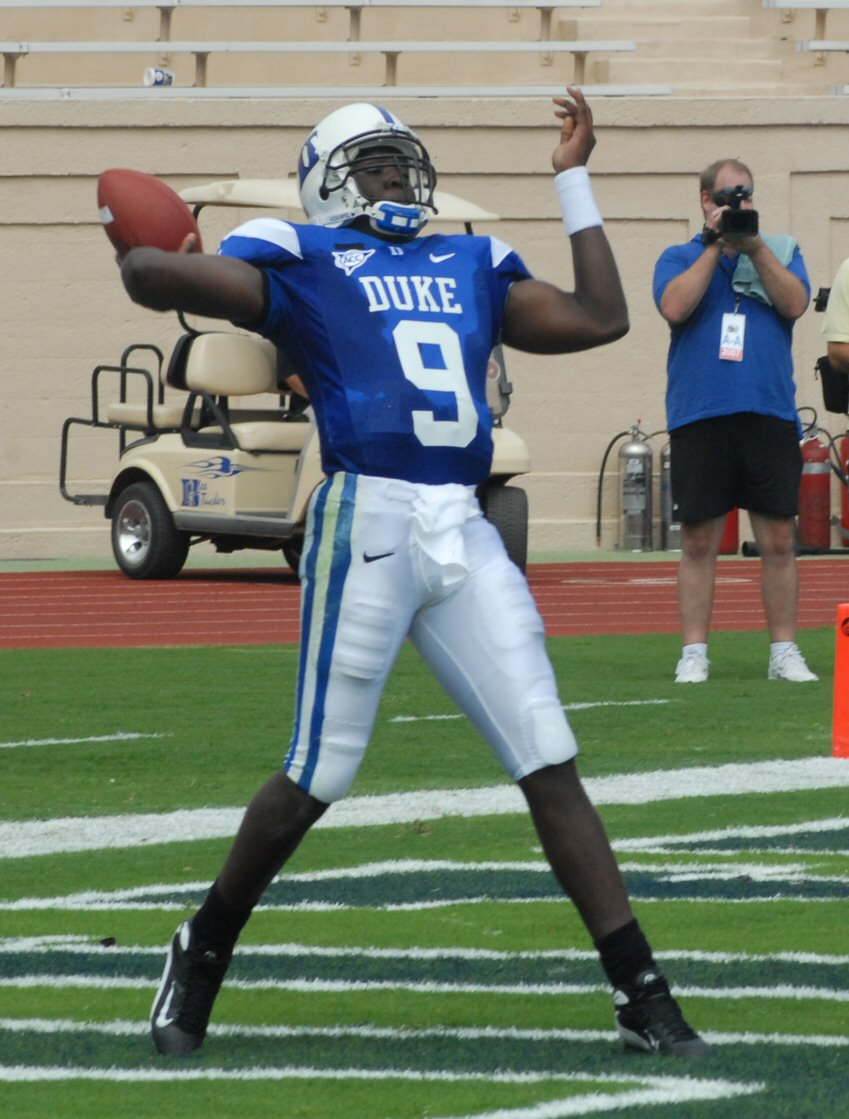
Lewis throwing a pass against Connecticut in Duke's 2007 opener.

Lewis played college football for the Duke Blue Devils. While at Duke, he set school records for career passing touchdowns and career passing yards. He also set Duke's school record for most consecutive pass attempts without an interception with 206. During his four years as a starting quarterback, he threw for 10,065 yards, 67 touchdowns and 40 interceptions, and ran for 9 touchdowns.

During his senior season, Lewis was a finalist for the Davey O'Brien Award, presented to the nation's top quarterback.

== Professional career ==
=== St. Louis Rams ===
Lewis signed with the St. Louis Rams as an undrafted free agent soon after the 2010 NFL draft. He was waived on September 18, 2010, and signed to the practice squad three days later. He signed a reserve/future contract with the Rams on January 3, 2011. Lewis was later waived on September 3, 2011.

=== Cleveland Browns (first stint) ===
The Cleveland Browns claimed Lewis off of waivers on September 4, 2011. He was waived by the Browns over a year later on October 11, 2012. He was signed to the practice squad on October 13. Lewis was again added to the Browns' active roster on December 24, after injuries to Brandon Weeden and Colt McCoy. He made his first career start when the Browns took on the Pittsburgh Steelers on December 30, and completed 22 of 32 passes for 204 yards with one touchdown and one interception. Notwithstanding Lewis' performance, the Browns lost 24–10. This performance was particularly noteworthy due to his strong performance against the first-ranked defense of the NFL during the 2012 season. Lewis was waived by the Browns on May 22, 2013.

=== Detroit Lions ===
The Detroit Lions claimed him off waivers on May 28, 2013. He looked to compete with 2012 undrafted free agent and former Heisman Trophy finalist Kellen Moore for the third quarterback position.

=== Buffalo Bills ===
On August 25, 2013, the Buffalo Bills traded linebacker Chris White for Lewis, due to the mounting quarterback injuries for the Bills. He was released on August 31, and signed to the practice squad on September 1. On October 7, coach Doug Marrone announced on WGR Sports Radio 550 that Lewis was promoted to the active roster from the practice squad after an injury to E. J. Manuel and started week 6 against the Cincinnati Bengals, over undrafted rookie Jeff Tuel, where he went 19/32 for 216 yards with 2 passing touchdowns and 0 interceptions and added 7 carries for 17 yards and 1 rushing touchdown. The Bills lost the game in overtime by a score of 27–24.

On October 20, Lewis went 21/32 for 202 yards with no touchdown passes and 1 interception. He also had 5 carries for 13 yards as he earned his first career victory against the Miami Dolphins by a score of 23–21. In a week 8 loss to the New Orleans Saints, Lewis completed 22 of 39 passes for 234 yards, 1 touchdown and 1 interception along with 2 rushes for 5 yards. This game was arguably his worst as he fumbled the ball 3 times. On November 3, against the Kansas City Chiefs in week 9, Tuel was named the starting quarterback, only to be replaced the following week by the original week 1 starter Manuel. Manuel started the next 5 games against the Pittsburgh Steelers, New York Jets, Atlanta Falcons, Tampa Bay Buccaneers, and Jacksonville Jaguars.

After Manuel suffered another injury, Lewis received his second win as a member of the Bills during Week 16 in a shutout victory over their division rival Dolphins with a score of 19–0. He went 15/25 for 193 yards with zero touchdowns and 1 interception while adding 8 carries for 13 yards. This loss would be a major factor for the Dolphins not making the playoffs, since they needed to win just one of their final two games for a wildcard spot, which they lost both. With Manuel still injured, Lewis was named the starter for the season finale. In his final game as a Bill, Lewis played at Gillette Stadium against Tom Brady and the New England Patriots. Although Lewis outshone Brady on that day, by throwing for more yards than him and not throwing an interception like Brady did, his team lost to the Patriots by a score of 34–20. Lewis went 16/29 for 247 yards with 1 touchdown and no interceptions. He also added 2 carries for 4 yards. Lewis finished his 2013 Bills season with a 2–3 record as Buffalo's starting quarterback. On August 26, 2014, Lewis was released from the Bills.

=== Houston Texans ===
Lewis signed with the Houston Texans on November 24, 2014, after starting quarterback Ryan Mallett suffered a season-ending injury. Lewis was released on March 9, 2015.

=== Cleveland Browns (second stint) ===
The Browns signed Lewis on March 12, 2015. He was released from the team on September 5.

=== Philadelphia Eagles ===
Lewis signed with the Philadelphia Eagles on September 21, 2015. He became a free agent after the 2015 season.

=== San Francisco 49ers ===
Lewis signed with the San Francisco 49ers on March 10, 2016, reuniting him with former Eagles coach Chip Kelly. On August 16, the 49ers placed Lewis on injured reserve. He became a free agent again after the 2016 season.

=== Baltimore Ravens ===
On August 14, 2017, Lewis signed with the Baltimore Ravens. On September 1, he was released by the Ravens during final roster cuts.

== Career statistics ==
=== NFL ===
Year	Team	Games			Passing								Rushing				Sacks		Fumbles (Note: Fumbles lost data taken from Pro Football Reference career game log)	
Year	Team	GP	GS	Record	Cmp	Att	Pct	Yds	Y/A	TD	Int	Rtg	Att	Yds	Avg	TD	Sck	SckY	Fum	Lost
2010	STL	0	0	DNP																
2011	CLE	0	0	DNP																
2012	CLE	1	1	0–1	32	22	68.8	204	6.4	1	1	83.3	1	3	3.0	0	3	14	0	0
2013	BUF	6	5	2–3	157	93	59.2	1,092	7.0	4	3	81.0	24	52	2.2	1	18	100	7	3
2014	HOU	0	0	DNP																
2015	PHI	0	0	DNP																
2016	SF	0	0	DNP																
Career		7	6	2–4	189	115	60.8	1,296	6.9	5	4	81.4	25	55	2.2	1	21	114	7	3

=== College ===
Season	Team	GP	Passing							Rushing		
Season	Team	GP	Cmp	Att	Pct	Yds	TD	Int	Rtg	Att	Yds	TD
2006	Duke	12	180	340	52.9	2,134	11	16	106.9	99	−74	1
2007	Duke	12	199	360	55.3	2,430	21	10	125.7	96	−148	2
2008	Duke	11	224	361	62.0	2,171	15	6	123.0	69	96	2
2009	Duke	12	274	449	61.0	3,330	20	8	134.5	86	48	4
Career		47	697	1,170	59.4	10,065	67	40	127.69	350	−78	9

== Coaching career ==
=== UCLA ===
In January 2018, Lewis was hired by UCLA as an offensive analyst.

=== Tampa Bay Buccaneers ===
On July 22, 2020, Lewis was hired as an intern by the Tampa Bay Buccaneers. Following the 2020 NFL season, Lewis was hired as an offensive assistant. He was promoted to assistant wide receivers coach on May 5, 2021.

On February 24, 2023, Lewis was promoted to the role of quarterbacks coach. On January 8, 2026, Lewis was fired by Tampa Bay.

== See also ==
- List of Division I FBS passing yardage leaders
