= Bob Trott =

American football player and coach (born 1954)

Biographical details
- Born: March 19, 1954 (age 72); Concord, North Carolina, U.S.

Playing career
- 1973–1975: North Carolina
- Position: Defensive back

Coaching career (HC unless noted)
- 1976–1977: North Carolina (GA)
- 1978–1983: Air Force (assistant)
- 1984–1988: Arkansas (DB)
- 1989: Arkansas (DC/DB)
- 1990: Clemson (DC/DB)
- 1991–1992: New York Giants (DA)
- 1993–1995: New England Patriots (DB)
- 1996–2001: Duke (DC/DB)
- 2002: Baylor (DC/DB)
- 2003–2004: Louisiana–Monroe (DC/SAF)
- 2005–2008: Cleveland Browns (DA)
- 2009: Virginia (LB)
- 2010–2015: Richmond (DC)
- 2016–2018: James Madison (DC)
- 2019: East Carolina (DC)

Accomplishments and honors

Awards
- FootballScoop Coordinator of the Year (2017)

Bob Trott (born March 19, 1954) is an American football coach and former player. He was previously the defensive coordinator at East Carolina University. Prior to this position he was the defensive coordinator at James Madison University. He is also a Dealer Trade driver for Capital Subaru of Greenville NC

== Early life ==
Trott was born in Concord, North Carolina and grew up in Kannapolis. Trott went to AL Brown High School.

== Coaching career ==
Trott played at North Carolina under Coach Bill Dooley and began his coaching career as a graduate assistant at UNC in 1976. Trott then landed an assistant's position at the Air Force Academy in 1978, working with defensive ends under Bill Parcells. In 1984, Trott took a position at the University of Arkansas as the defensive backs coach for the Razorbacks. Trott was promoted to defensive coordinator in 1989. Trott helped Arkansas win back-to-back Southwest Conference championships in 1988 and '89.

Trott moved on to Clemson in 1990, serving as the Tigers' defensive coordinator and defensive backs coach. The Tigers led the NCAA in total defense in 1990. One year later, Trott moved up to the NFL to join Ray Handley's staff with the New York Giants. After two years as a defensive assistant with the Giants, Trott rejoined Parcells in New England as defensive backs coach. In 1996 Trott returned to the college ranks and became the defensive coordinator/defensive backs coach at Duke.

After five season with the Blue Devils, Trott left Duke to take the same position at Baylor. After only one season in Waco he moved down to the Sun Belt Conference to become the defensive coordinator for Louisiana-Monroe. At ULM they beat rival Louisiana Lafayette both years. Trott had a second NFL stint when he was hired as a Cleveland Browns defensive assistant coach on February 26, 2005. Since 2009 Trott has served as a defensive coach with various Virginia universities. This included one year as linebackers coach at UVA, six seasons as the defensive coordinator at Richmond. Richmond in 2015 shared the CAA title and finished 3rd in the nation. In 2014 Trott was the Assistant Head coach and secondary coach on the Under19 USA Football team which won the world Championship in 2014 in Kuwait. Also in 2014 Trott was the commencement speaker for AL Brown High School and was selected in the Cabarrus County Sports Hall of Fame. Trott was named the Defensive coordinator at James Madison University in 2016. JMU won the CAA with an undefeated 8-0 record. JMU led the nation in interceptions. JMU finished 14-1 and won the FCS Division I National Championship. In 2017 JMU won the CAA again at 8-0. JMU finished 2nd in the FCS National Championship going 14-1 for the 2nd year in a row. The defense led the entire NCAA in Interception with 31. JMU finished 1st on scoring, 1st in Takaways, 1st in pass efficiency and 3rd in total Defense. Trott was named the 2017 FootballScoop Coordinator of the year. Trott was named defensive coordinator for East Carolina University during the 2019 season but his contract was not renewed. Trott was the 5th coordinator for ECU in the Last 4 seasons. The Pirates struggled on defense.

=== Coaching mentors ===
Trott has served on the coaching staffs of eleven college bowl teams and has been a defensive coordinator at eight NCAA Division I universities. Trott has served as a coach or player under renowned head coaches Bill Parcells, Al Groh, Romeo Crennel, Ken Hatfield, Fred Goldsmith and Bill Dooley.
