= 2009 Duke Blue Devils football team =

American college football season

2009 Duke Blue Devils football
- Conference: Atlantic Coast Conference
- Coastal Division
- Record: 5–7 (3–5 ACC)
- Head coach: David Cutcliffe (2nd season)
- Co-offensive coordinators: Kurt Roper (2nd season); Matt Luke (2nd season)
- Offensive scheme: Multiple
- Co-defensive coordinators: Mike MacIntyre (2nd season); Marion Hobby (2nd season)
- Base defense: Multiple
- MVP: Thad Lewis
- Captains: Thad Lewis; Vincent Rey
- Home stadium: Wallace Wade Stadium

2009 Atlantic Coast Conference football standings
	Conf.			Overall
Team	W		L	W		L
Atlantic Division
No. 24 Clemson x	6	–	2	9	–	5
Boston College	5	–	3	8	–	5
Florida State	4	–	4	7	–	6
Wake Forest	3	–	5	5	–	7
NC State	2	–	6	5	–	7
Maryland	1	–	7	2	–	10
Coastal Division
No. 13 Georgia Tech * x$	7	–	1	11	–	3
No. 10 Virginia Tech	6	–	2	10	–	3
No. 19 Miami (FL)	5	–	3	9	–	4
North Carolina *	0	–	4	0	–	5
Duke	3	–	5	5	–	7
Virginia	2	–	6	3	–	9
Championship: Georgia Tech 39, Clemson 34
$ – BCS representative as conference champion; North Carolina vacated 8 wins, including 4 ACC wins.; Rankings from AP Poll

The 2009 Duke Blue Devils football team represented Duke University in the 2009 NCAA Division I FBS football season. It was Duke's 57th season as a member of the Atlantic Coast Conference (ACC) and fifth in its Coastal Division. The Blue Devils were led by second-year head coach David Cutcliffe. Duke finished the season 5–7 overall and 3–5 in ACC play, failing to qualify for a bowl game for the 15th straight season.

== Schedule ==
Date	Time	Opponent	Site	TV	Result	Attendance	Source
September 5	7:00 pm	No. 2 (FCS) Richmond*	Wallace Wade Stadium; Durham, NC		L 16–24	33,011	
September 12	12:00 pm	at Army*	Michie Stadium; West Point, NY	CBS-CSN	W 35–19	25,698	
September 19	12:00 pm	at No. 22 Kansas*	Memorial Stadium; Lawrence, KS	Versus	L 16–44	50,101	
September 26	7:00 pm	North Carolina Central*^{†}	Wallace Wade Stadium; Durham, NC	ACC Select	W 49–14	26,390	
October 3	12:00 pm	No. 6 Virginia Tech	Wallace Wade Stadium; Durham, NC	ESPN360	L 26–34	26,211	
October 10	4:00 pm	at NC State	Carter–Finley Stadium; Raleigh, NC (rivalry)	ESPNU	W 49–28	56,452	
October 24	1:30 pm	Maryland	Wallace Wade Stadium; Durham, NC	ESPN360	W 17–13	24,650	
October 31	3:30 pm	at Virginia	Scott Stadium; Charlottesville, VA	ESPN360	W 28–17	41,713	
November 7	3:30 pm	at North Carolina	Kenan Memorial Stadium; Chapel Hill, NC (Victory Bell)	ESPNU	L 6–19	59,750	
November 14	12:00 pm	No. 7 Georgia Tech	Wallace Wade Stadium; Durham, NC	ESPN2	L 10–49	25,899	
November 21	12:00 pm	at No. 21 Miami (FL)	Land Shark Stadium; Miami Gardens, FL	ESPNU	L 16–34	38,200	
November 28	12:00 pm	Wake Forest	Wallace Wade Stadium; Durham, NC (rivalry)	Raycom	L 34–45	21,420	
*Non-conference game; ^{†}Homecoming; Rankings from AP Poll released prior to the game; All times are in Eastern time

== Personnel ==
=== Roster ===
2009 Duke Blue Devils football team roster
Players
Coaches
Offense

Pos.	#	Name	Class
QB	9	Thad Lewis	Sr

Defense

Pos.	#	Name	Class
CB	40	Matt Daniels	So
S	35	Jeff Faris	So
LB	31	Vincent Rey	Sr

Special teams

Pos.	#	Name	Class

Head coach

- David Cutcliffe

Coordinators/assistant coaches

Legend

- (C) Team captain
- (S) Suspended
- (I) Ineligible
- Injured
- Redshirt

== Game summaries ==
=== Richmond ===
	1	2	3	4	Total
No. 2 (FCS) Spiders	7	7	0	10	24
Blue Devils	2	7	0	7	16

=== At Army ===
	1	2	3	4	Total
Blue Devils	0	7	7	21	35
Black Knights	7	3	3	6	19

=== At No. 22 Kansas ===
	1	2	3	4	Total
Blue Devils	7	0	3	6	16
No. 22 Jayhawks	7	13	17	7	44

=== North Carolina Central ===
	1	2	3	4	Total
Eagles	7	7	0	0	14
Blue Devils	21	7	14	7	49

=== No. 6 Virginia Tech ===
	1	2	3	4	Total
No. 6 Hokies	7	10	3	14	34
Blue Devils	7	3	3	13	26

=== At NC State ===
	1	2	3	4	Total
Blue Devils	14	7	14	14	49
Wolfpack	14	7	7	0	28

=== Maryland ===
	1	2	3	4	Total
Terrapins	3	3	7	0	13
Blue Devils	7	3	7	0	17

=== At Virginia ===
	1	2	3	4	Total
Blue Devils	6	3	0	19	28
Cavaliers	0	3	7	7	17

=== At North Carolina ===
	1	2	3	4	Total
Blue Devils	3	3	0	0	6
Tar Heels	3	3	3	10	19

=== No. 7 Georgia Tech ===
	1	2	3	4	Total
No. 7 Yellow Jackets	7	21	14	7	49
Blue Devils	10	0	0	0	10

=== At No. 21 Miami (FL) ===
	1	2	3	4	Total
Blue Devils	3	10	3	0	16
No. 21 Hurricanes	3	7	3	21	34

=== Wake Forest ===
	1	2	3	4	Total
Demon Deacons	14	7	14	10	45
Blue Devils	14	3	3	14	34

== Notes ==
- When the Blue Devils defeated the Maryland Terrapins on October 24, it marked the first time Duke had beaten consecutive ACC opponents since 1994.
