= Sean Renfree =

American football player (born 1990)

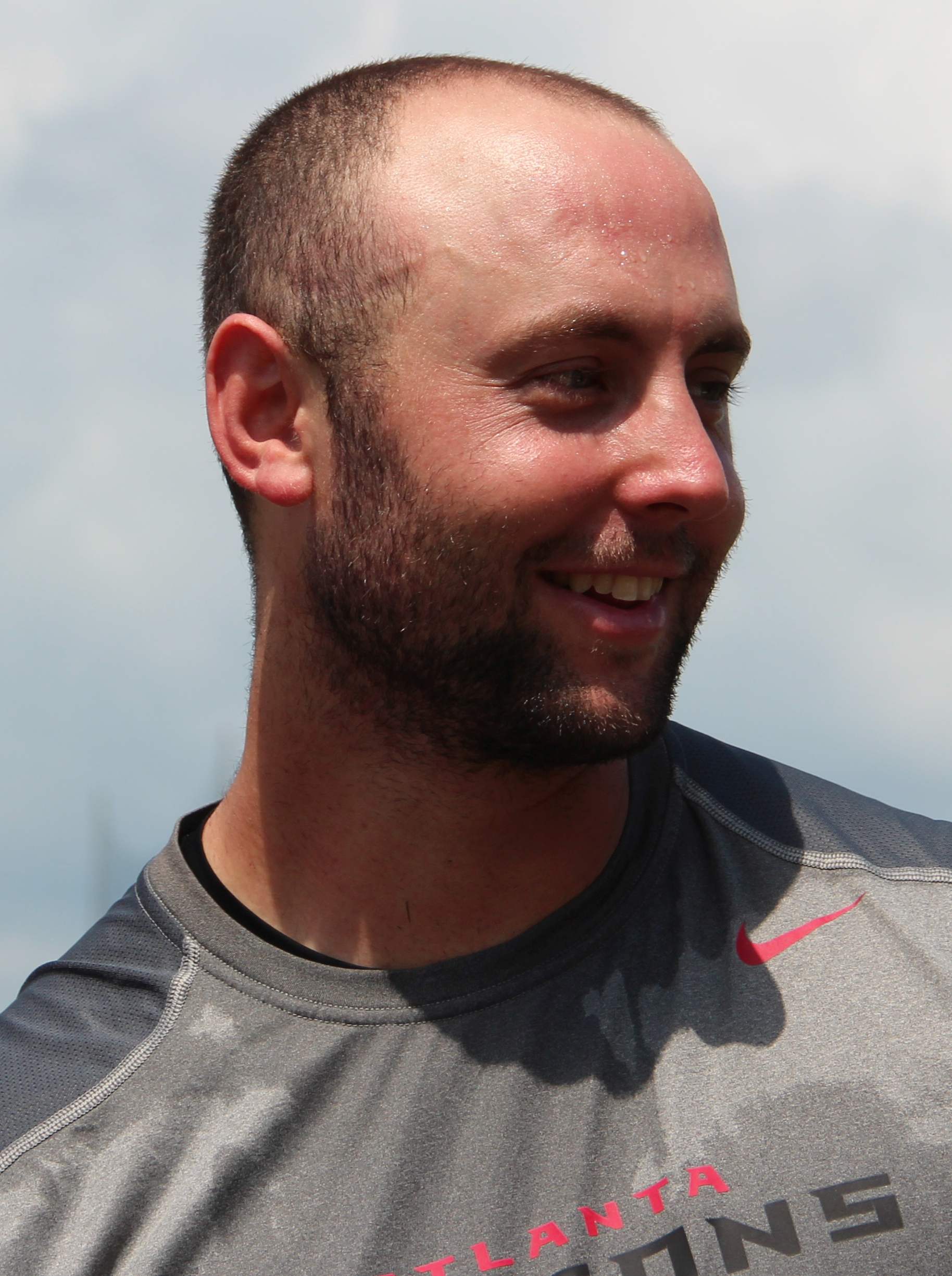
- Renfree with the Atlanta Falcons in 2016

No. 12
- Position: Quarterback

Personal information
- Born: April 28, 1990 (age 36); Miami, Florida, U.S.
- Listed height: 6 ft 5 in (1.96 m)
- Listed weight: 225 lb (102 kg)

Career information
- High school: Notre Dame Prep (Scottsdale, Arizona)
- College: Duke
- NFL draft: 2013: 7th round, 249th overall pick

Career history
- Atlanta Falcons (2013–2015); Tampa Bay Buccaneers (2017)*
- * Offseason or practice squad member only

Career NFL statistics
- Passing attempts: 7
- Passing completions: 3
- Percentage: 42.9
- TD–INT: 0–1
- Passing yards: 11
- Passer rating: 10.7
- Stats at Pro Football Reference

Sean Patrick Renfree (born April 28, 1990) is an American former professional football player who was a quarterback in the National Football League (NFL). After playing college football for the Duke Blue Devils, he was selected by the Atlanta Falcons in the seventh round of the 2013 NFL draft.

== Early life ==
Renfree attended Notre Dame Preparatory High School in Scottsdale, Arizona, where he was a four-year letterman in football. He was voted as the team's "Most Valuable Player" his junior and senior year. In his junior year, Renfree, threw for 2,483 yards and 25 touchdowns with five interceptions. Before the start of his senior year Renfree was invited to the 2007 Elite 11 Camp alongside future NFL quarterbacks Andrew Luck, Blaine Gabbert, Mike Glennon, Landry Jones, and EJ Manuel. As a senior, he completed 197 of 357 passes for 3,353 yards and 41 touchdowns with just six interceptions. Renfree finished off his high school career by completing 23 of 33 passes for a state championship game record 411 yards and five touchdowns against Cottonwood Mingus. He was named Arizona's Big School Class 5A and 4A Player of the Year and to the All-Arizona team as a senior by The Arizona Republic. He was also named to the Parade All-American High School Football team in his senior year in 2008.

== College career ==
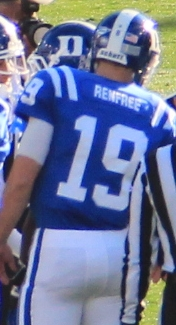
Renfree with Duke in 2012

As a freshman in 2009, Renfree played in five games as a backup and completed 34 of 50 passes for 334 yards, four touchdowns, and two interceptions. While playing in the fourth quarter against Georgia Tech Renfree suffered from a torn ACL and was forced to miss the remainder of the 2009 season. In 2010, Renfree started 11 of 12 games, and was the recipient of the Carmen Falcone Award as Duke's Most Valuable Player. On the season, he completed 285 of 464 pass attempts for 3,131 yards with 14 touchdowns and 17 interceptions. In 2011, serving as a team captain, Renfree started all 12 games and completed 282 of 434 pass attempts for 2,891 yards with 14 touchdowns and 11 interceptions. This set the Duke single-season record for pass completion percentage. In 2012, Renfree completed 297 of his 442 passes for 3,113 yards, 19 touchdowns and 11 interceptions. He ended his career owning or sharing 14 school records and earned the team's Carmen Falcone MVP award for a second time. He sustained a torn right pectoral muscle in his right (throwing) arm on the last play of Duke's last game (Belk Bowl) requiring surgical repair and, as a result, was unable to participate in the NFL Combine or Duke's Pro Day hurting his draft stock.

In recognition for his athletic and academic performance in 2012, Renfree was the recipient of several prestigious awards including the ACC's Jim Tatum Award, National Football Foundation Scholar Athlete Award, and Pop Warner National College Football Award. He was also named a finalist for the William Campbell Trophy, which is considered the "Academic Heisman" in college football.

== Professional career ==
Pre-draft measurables
Height	Weight	Arm length	Hand span
6 ft 3 1/8 in (1.91 m)	219 lb (99 kg)	32 in (0.81 m)	9 in (0.23 m)
All values from NFL Scouting Combine

=== Atlanta Falcons ===
On April 27, 2013, Renfree was selected in the seventh round (249th overall) by the Atlanta Falcons of the National Football League. He signed with the team on July 24. Terms were undisclosed. In his rookie season (2013) he was placed on injured reserve with a shoulder injury in preseason. During the 2014 season he did not appear in any games. During the 2015 season he appeared in two games. On August 27, 2016, Renfree was waived by the Falcons.

=== Tampa Bay Buccaneers ===
On January 30, 2017, Renfree signed a reserve/future contract with the Tampa Bay Buccaneers. He was released by the Buccaneers on May 19, after the team signed veteran quarterback Ryan Fitzpatrick.

== Career statistics ==
=== NFL ===
Year	Team	GP	GS	Passing								Rushing			
Year	Team	GP	GS	Cmp	Att	Pct	Yds	Y/A	TD	Int	Rtg	Att	Yds	Avg	TD
2015	ATL	2	0	3	7	42.9	11	1.6	0	1	10.7	1	-4	-4.0	0

=== College ===
Year	Team	Passing								Rushing			
Year	Team	Cmp	Att	Pct	Yds	Y/A	TD	Int	Rtg	Att	Yds	Avg	TD
2009	Duke	34	50	68.0	330	6.6	4	2	141.8	6	-12	-2.0	0
2010	Duke	285	464	61.4	3,131	6.7	14	17	120.7	51	-47	-0.9	4
2011	Duke	282	434	65.0	2,891	6.7	14	11	126.5	58	-58	-1.0	4
2012	Duke	297	441	67.3	3,113	7.1	19	10	136.3	38	-50	-1.3	1
Career		898	1,389	64.7	9,465	6.8	51	40	128.2	153	-167	-1.1	9

== Personal life and family ==
Renfree is the oldest of three brothers. His youngest brother, Charlie, played football as a center at the University of Wyoming.
