= Corey Thomas (American football) =

American football player (born 1975)

No. 15, 80
- Position: Wide receiver

Personal information
- Born: June 6, 1975 (age 51); Wilson, North Carolina, U.S.
- Listed height: 6 ft 0 in (1.83 m)
- Listed weight: 164 lb (74 kg)

Career information
- High school: E. T. Beddingfield (Wilson)
- College: Duke
- NFL draft: 1998: undrafted

Career history
- Detroit Lions (1998–1999); Miami Dolphins (2000)*; Frankfurt Galaxy (2000); Carolina Cobras (2001)*; Buffalo Bills (2001)*
- * Offseason or practice squad member only

Career NFL statistics
- Games played: 1
- Stats at Pro Football Reference

Corey Jermaine Thomas (born June 6, 1975) is an American former professional football player who was a wide receiver for one game with the Detroit Lions of the National Football League (NFL) in 1998. He played college football for the Duke Blue Devils.
