= Georgia Tech Yellow Jackets football statistical leaders =

Georgia Tech Yellow Jackets football statistical list

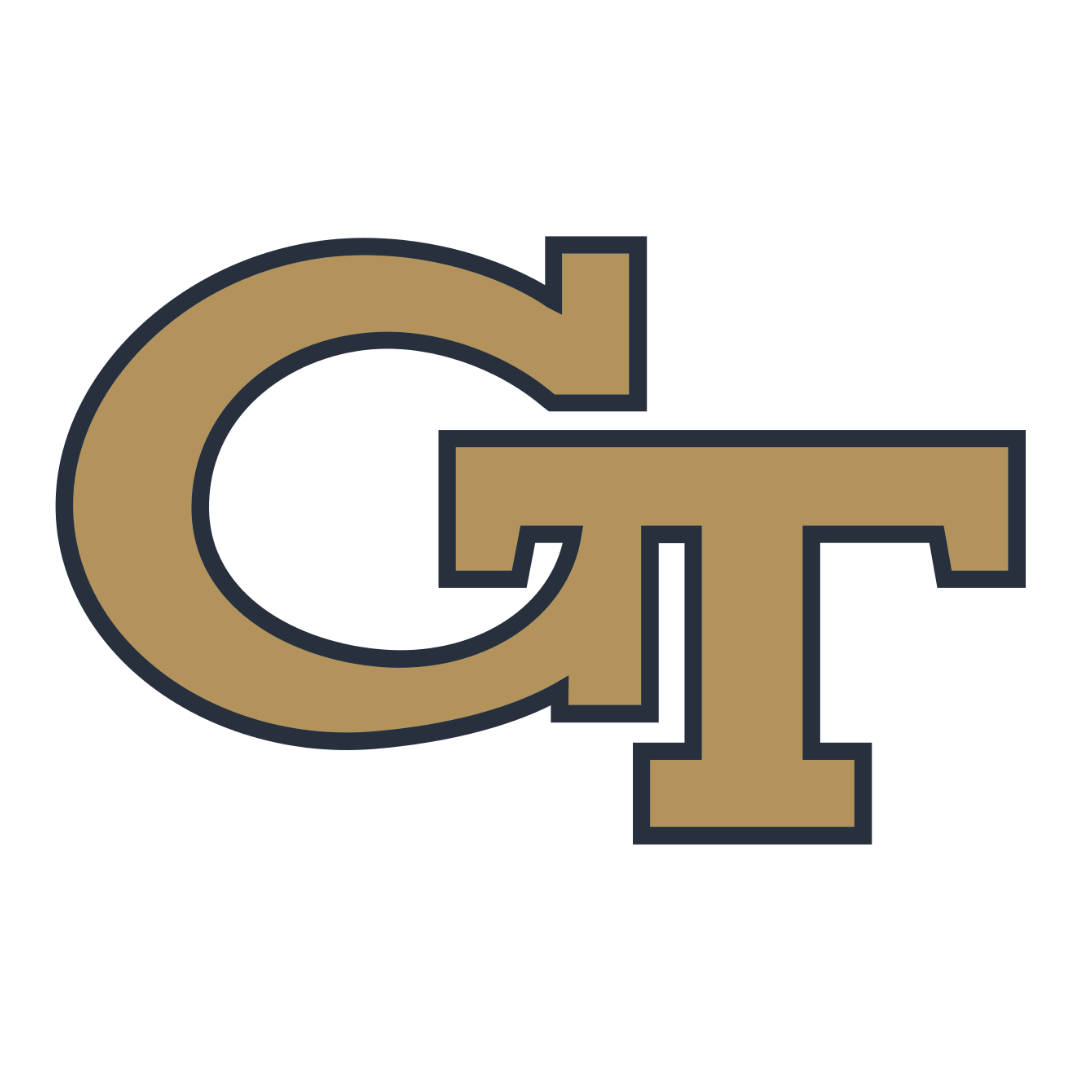

The Georgia Tech Yellow Jackets football statistical leaders are individual statistical leaders of the Georgia Tech Yellow Jackets football program in various categories, including passing, rushing, receiving, total offense, defensive stats, and kicking. Within those areas, the lists identify single-game, single-season, and career leaders. The Yellow Jackets represent the Georgia Institute of Technology in the NCAA Division I FBS Atlantic Coast Conference.

Although Georgia Tech began competing in intercollegiate football in 1892, the school's official record book considers the "modern era" to have begun in 1948. Records from before this year are often incomplete and inconsistent, and they are generally not included in these lists.

These lists are dominated by more recent players for several reasons:

- Since 1948, seasons have increased from 10 games to 11 and then 12 games in length.
- The NCAA didn't allow freshmen to play varsity football until 1972 (with the exception of the World War II years), allowing players to have four-year careers.
- Bowl games only began counting toward single-season and career statistics in 2002. The Yellow Jackets have played in 18 bowl games since then, allowing many recent players an extra game to accumulate statistics.
- The Yellow Jackets have also played in the ACC Championship Game four times since its establishment in 2005, providing yet another extra game for players in those seasons.
- Since 2018, players have been allowed to participate in as many as four games in a redshirt season; previously, playing in even one game "burned" the redshirt. Since 2024, postseason games have not counted against the four-game limit. These changes to redshirt rules have given very recent players several extra games to accumulate statistics.
- Due to COVID-19 disruptions, the NCAA did not count the 2020 season against the eligibility of any football player, giving all players active in that season five years of eligibility instead of the normal four.
- All of the Yellow Jackets' highest seasons in total offensive yards have come since 1999. Passing totals weren't as high during the tenure of former head coach Paul Johnson (American football coach) from 2008 to 2018, as his offensive scheme was the run-heavy triple option.

These lists were last fully updated through the end of the 2025 season. The Georgia Tech Media Guide excludes the final three games of the 2009 season from Demaryius Thomas's career and season statistics due to NCAA sanctions, but those statistics are included here.

== Passing ==
=== Passing yards ===
Career
Rank	Player	Yards	Years
1	Joe Hamilton	8,882	1996 1997 1998 1999
2	Shawn Jones	8,441	1989 1990 1991 1992
3	Reggie Ball	8,128	2003 2004 2005 2006
4	Haynes King	7,923	2023 2024 2025
5	George Godsey	6,137	1998 1999 2000 2001
6	Mike Kelley	5,249	1978 1979 1980 1981
7	Justin Thomas	4,754	2013 2014 2015 2016
8	Jeff Sims	4,464	2020 2021 2022
9	John Dewberry	4,193	1983 1984 1985
10	Eddie McAshan	4,080	1970 1971 1972

Single season
Rank	Player	Yards	Year
1	George Godsey	3,085	2001
2	Joe Hamilton	3,060	1999
3	Haynes King	2,957	2025
4	George Godsey	2,906	2000
5	Haynes King	2,842	2023
6	Shawn Jones	2,397	1992
7	Joe Hamilton	2,314	1997
8	Shawn Jones	2,288	1991
9	A.J. Suggs	2,242	2002
10	Joe Hamilton	2,166	1998

Single game
Rank	Player	Yards	Year	Opponent
1	George Godsey	486	2001	Virginia
2	George Godsey	454	2000	Clemson
3	Darrell Gast	416	1987	Duke
4	Haynes King	408	2025	NC State
5	Joe Hamilton	387	1999	Florida State
	Joe Hamilton	387	1999	Maryland
7	Aaron Philo	373	2025	Gardner-Webb
8	Eddie McAshan	371	1972	Rice
	Haynes King	371	2025	Boston College
10	Mike Kelley	361	1979	Navy

=== Passing touchdowns ===
Career
Rank	Player	TDs	Years
1	Joe Hamilton	65	1996 1997 1998 1999
2	Reggie Ball	57	2003 2004 2005 2006
3	Haynes King	55	2023 2024 2025
4	Shawn Jones	51	1989 1990 1991 1992
5	George Godsey	41	1998 1999 2000 2001
6	Justin Thomas	40	2013 2014 2015 2016
7	Eddie McAshan	32	1970 1971 1972
8	Jeff Sims	30	2020 2021 2022
9	John Dewberry	27	1983 1984 1985
10	Mike Kelley	23	1978 1979 1980 1981

Single season
Rank	Player	TDs	Year
1	Joe Hamilton	29	1999
2	Haynes King	27	2023
3	George Godsey	23	2000
4	Reggie Ball	20	2006
5	George Godsey	18	2001
	Justin Thomas	18	2014
7	Joe Hamilton	17	1998
8	Eddie McAshan	16	1972
	Reggie Ball	16	2004
10	Frank Broyles	15	1944
	Shawn Jones	15	1992

Single game
Rank	Player	TDs	Year	Opponent
1	Eddie McAshan	5	1972	Rice
	Joe Hamilton	5	1999	Clemson

== Rushing ==
=== Rushing yards ===
Career
Rank	Player	Yards	Years
1	Robert Lavette	4,066	1981 1982 1983 1984
2	Jerry Mays	3,699	1985 1986 1988 1989
3	Eddie Lee Ivery	3,517	1975 1976 1977 1978
4	Tashard Choice	3,365	2005 2006 2007
5	P.J. Daniels	3,346	2002 2003 2004 2005
6	Jonathan Dwyer	3,226	2007 2008 2009
7	Joshua Nesbitt	2,806	2007 2008 2009 2010
8	Joe Burns	2,634	1998 1999 2000 2001
9	Jamal Haynes	2,534	2022 2023 2024 2025
10	Justin Thomas	2,412	2013 2014 2015 2016

Single season
Rank	Player	Yards	Year
1	Eddie Lee Ivery	1,562	1978
2	Tashard Choice	1,473	2006
3	P.J. Daniels	1,447	2003
4	Jonathan Dwyer	1,395	2008
.	Jonathan Dwyer	1,395	2009
6	Tashard Choice	1,379	2007
7	Jerry Mays	1,349	1989
8	Anthony Allen	1,316	2010
9	Robert Lavette	1,208	1982
10	Robert Lavette	1,189	1984

Single game
Rank	Player	Yards	Year	Opponent
1	Eddie Lee Ivery	356	1978	Air Force
2	P.J. Daniels	307	2003	Tulsa
3	TaQuon Marshall	249	2017	Tennessee
4	Jimy Lincoln	229	1991	Virginia
5	Brent Cunningham	217	1970	Clemson
6	Tobias Oliver	215	2018	Virginia Tech
7	Roddy Jones	214	2008	Georgia
8	Jerry Mays	207	1989	Georgia
9	Jerry Mays	206	1985	Western Carolina
	C.J. Williams	206	1994	Wake Forest

=== Rushing touchdowns ===
Career
Rank	Player	TDs	Years
1	Robert Lavette	45	1981 1982 1983 1984
2	Tevin Washington	38	2009 2010 2011 2012
3	Haynes King	36	2023 2024 2025
4	Joshua Nesbitt	35	2007 2008 2009 2010
	Jonathan Dwyer	35	2007 2008 2009
6	Joe Burns	31	1998 1999 2000 2001
7	Tashard Choice	28	2005 2006 2007
8	TaQuon Marshall	27	2015 2016 2017 2018
9	P.J. Daniels	23	2002 2003 2004 2005
	David Sims	23	2010 2011 2012 2013

Single season
Rank	Player	TDs	Year
1	Tevin Washington	20	2012
2	Robert Lavette	19	1982
3	Joshua Nesbitt	18	2009
4	TaQuon Marshall	17	2017
5	Haynes King	15	2025
6	Robert Lavette	14	1984
	Joe Burns	14	2001
	Jonathan Dwyer	14	2009
	Tevin Washington	14	2011
10	Sean Gregory	13	1999

Single game
Rank	Player	TDs	Year	Opponent
1	TaQuon Marshall	5	2017	Tennessee
2	George Maloof	4	1951	Georgia
	Robert Lavette	4	1982	Virginia
	Tony Hollings	4	2002	Connecticut
	P.J. Daniels	4	2003	Tulsa
	Tevin Washington	4	2012	Middle Tennessee

== Receiving ==
=== Receptions ===
Career
Rank	Player	Rec	Years
1	Kelly Campbell	195	1998 1999 2000 2001
2	Malik Rutherford	182	2021 2022 2023 2024 2025
3	Calvin Johnson	178	2004 2005 2006
4	Jonathan Smith	174	2000 2001 2002 2003
5	Kerry Watkins	171	1999 2000 2001 2002
6	Harvey Middleton	165	1994 1995 1996 1997
7	Will Glover	122	1999 2000 2001 2002
8	Demaryius Thomas	120	2007 2008 2009
9	Jerry Mays	115	1985 1986 1988 1989
	Bobby Rodriguez	115	1989 1990 1991 1992

Single season
Rank	Player	Rec	Year
1	Jonathan Smith	78	2003
2	Calvin Johnson	76	2006
3	Kerry Watkins	71	2002
4	Kelly Campbell	69	1999
5	Harvey Middleton	64	1996
6	Malik Rutherford	62	2024
7	John Sias	61	1968
8	Nate McCollum	60	2022
9	Kelly Campbell	59	2000
10	Kelly Campbell	56	2001
	Eric Singleton Jr.	56	2024

Single game
Rank	Player	Rec	Year	Opponent
1	John Sias	14	1968	Navy
	Stephen Harkey	14	1970	South Carolina
	Robert Lavette	14	1981	Notre Dame
	Kelly Campbell	14	2000	Clemson
5	Will Glover	13	2001	Virginia
6	Kelly Campbell	11	1999	Duke

=== Receiving yards ===
Career
Rank	Player	Yards	Years
1	Calvin Johnson	2,927	2004 2005 2006
2	Kelly Campbell	2,907	1998 1999 2000 2001
3	Kerry Watkins	2,680	1999 2000 2001 2002
4	Demaryius Thomas	2,342	2007 2008 2009
5	Harvey Middleton	2,291	1994 1995 1996
6	Jonathan Smith	2,238	2000 2001 2002 2003
7	Malik Rutherford	2,014	2021 2022 2023 2024 2025
8	Dez White	1,833	1997 1998 1999
9	John Sias	1,727	1966 1967 1968
10	Bobby Rodriguez	1,681	1989 1990 1991 1992

Single season
Rank	Player	Yards	Year
1	Calvin Johnson	1,202	2006
2	Demaryius Thomas	1,157	2009
3	Jonathan Smith	1,138	2003
4	Kelly Campbell	1,105	1999
5	Kerry Watkins	1,050	2002
6	Dez White	973	1998
7	Kelly Campbell	963	2000
8	John Sias	902	1968
9	Calvin Johnson	888	2005
10	Dez White	860	1999

Single game
Rank	Player	Yards	Year	Opponent
1	Dez White	243	1998	Virginia
2	Demaryius Thomas	230	2008	Duke
3	Derrick Steagall	223	1997	Virginia
4	Dez White	215	1999	Maryland
5	Kelly Campbell	209	2000	Clemson
6	Kris Kentera	203	1979	Navy
	Kelly Campbell	203	1999	North Carolina
8	John Sias	198	1968	Navy
9	Jonathan Smith	194	2003	Wake Forest
10	Greg Lester	193	1987	Duke
	Kelly Campbell	193	2001	Syracuse

=== Receiving touchdowns ===
Career
Rank	Player	TDs	Years
1	Calvin Johnson	28	2004 2005 2006
2	Kelly Campbell	24	1998 1999 2000 2001
3	Kerry Watkins	22	1999 2000 2001 2002
4	Demaryius Thomas	15	2007 2008 2009
5	Buck Martin	14	1950 1951 1952
6	Gary Lee	14	1983 1984 1985 1986
7	Dez White	14	1997 1998 1999
8	Jimmy Robinson	13	1972 1973 1974
9	Greg Lester	13	1987 1988 1990 1991
10	Harvey Middleton	13	1994 1995 1996 1997

Single season
Rank	Player	TDs	Year
1	Calvin Johnson	15	2006
2	Kelly Campbell	10	1999
	Kelly Campbell	10	2000
	Demaryius Thomas	10	2009
5	Jimmy Robinson	9	1972
	Dez White	9	1998
7	Buck Martin	8	1951
8	Craig Baynham	7	1965
	Harvey Middleton	7	1997
	Calvin Johnson	7	2004
	DeAndre Smelter	7	2014
	Ahmarean Brown	7	2019
	Kyric McGowan	7	2021

Single game
Rank	Player	TDs	Year	Opponent
1	Buck Martin	4	1951	Auburn
2	Craig Baynham	3	1965	Duke
	Kris Kentera	3	1979	Navy
	Jason McGill	3	1992	Maryland
	Dez White	3	1998	Virginia
	Calvin Johnson	3	2004	Clemson

== Total offense ==
Total offense is the sum of passing and rushing statistics. It does not include receiving or returns.

=== Total offense yards ===
Career
Rank	Player	Yards	Years
1	Joe Hamilton	10,640	1996 1997 1998 1999
2	Haynes King	10,200	2023 2024 2025
3	Reggie Ball	9,579	2003 2004 2005 2006
4	Shawn Jones	9,296	1989 1990 1991 1992
5	Justin Thomas	7,166	2013 2014 2015 2016
6	George Godsey	6,125	1998 1999 2000 2001
7	Joshua Nesbitt	6,082	2007 2008 2009 2010
8	Jeff Sims	5,630	2020 2021 2022
9	Tevin Washington	5,537	2009 2010 2011 2012
10	Mike Kelley	5,198	1978 1979 1980 1981

Single season
Rank	Player	Yards	Year
1	Haynes King	3,920	2025
2	Joe Hamilton	3,794	1999
3	Haynes King	3,579	2023
4	George Godsey	3,094	2000
5	George Godsey	3,040	2001
6	Justin Thomas	2,805	2014
7	Joe Hamilton	2,792	1997
8	Joshua Nesbitt	2,738	2009
9	Haynes King	2,701	2024
10	Shawn Jones	2,649	1991

Single game
Rank	Player	Yards	Year	Opponent
1	Haynes King	511	2025	NC State
2	George Godsey	477	2001	Virginia
3	Joe Hamilton	474	1999	Maryland
4	Justin Thomas	459	2016	Duke
5	George Godsey	450	2000	Clemson
6	Joe Hamilton	435	1999	Georgia
7	Haynes King	424	2025	Boston College
8	Haynes King	413	2024	Georgia
9	Darrell Gast	412	1987	Duke
10	Joe Hamilton	410	1999	Clemson

=== Touchdowns responsible for ===
"Touchdowns responsible for" is the NCAA's official term for combined passing and rushing touchdowns.

Career
Rank	Player	TDs	Years
1	Haynes King	91	2023 2024 2025
2	Joe Hamilton	83	1996 1997 1998 1999
3	Shawn Jones	70	1989 1990 1991 1992
4	Reggie Ball	68	2003 2004 2005 2006
5	Justin Thomas	62	2013 2014 2015 2016
6	Tevin Washington	59	2009 2010 2011 2012
7	Joshua Nesbitt	55	2007 2008 2009 2010
8	George Godsey	47	1998 1999 2000 2001
9	Robert Lavette	46	1981 1982 1983 1984
10	Jeff Sims	41	2020 2021 2022

Single season
Rank	Player	TDs	Year
1	Haynes King	37	2023
2	Joe Hamilton	35	1999
3	Haynes King	29	2025
4	Joshua Nesbitt	28	2009
	Tevin Washington	28	2012
6	TaQuon Marshall	27	2017
7	Justin Thomas	26	2014
8	George Godsey	25	2000
	Tevin Washington	25	2011
	Haynes King	25	2024

Single game
Rank	Player	TDs	Year	Opponent
1	Eddie McAshan	5	1972	Rice
	Joe Hamilton	5	1999	Florida State
	Joe Hamilton	5	1999	Clemson
	Vad Lee	5	2013	Duke
	TaQuon Marshall	5	2017	Tennessee
	Haynes King	5	2024	Georgia
	Haynes King	5	2025	Syracuse

== Defense ==
=== Interceptions ===
Career
Rank	Player	Ints	Years
1	Willie Clay	16	1988 1989 1990 1991
2	Jeff Ford	14	1969 1970 1971
	Randy Rhino	14	1972 1973 1974
	Morgan Burnett	14	2007 2008 2009
5	Bobby Moorhead	13	1950 1951 1952
	Wade Mitchell	13	1953 1954 1955 1956
	Ken Swilling	13	1988 1989 1990 1991
8	Bill Eastman	12	1965 1966 1967
	Lawrence Lowe	12	1977 1978 1979 1980
	Ted Thurson	12	1979 1980 1981 1982
	Jeremy Muyres	12	1999 2000 2001 2002

Single season
Rank	Player	Ints	Year
1	Jeff Ford	9	1969
	Willie Clay	9	1991
3	Randy Rhino	8	1972
4	Bobby Moorhead	7	1952
	Morgan Burnett	7	2008
6	Bob McCoy	6	1950
	George Morris	6	1951
	Charlie Brannon	6	1952
	Bill Eastman	6	1965
	Rick Lewis	6	1970
	Randy Rhino	6	1973
	Ken Swilling	6	1989

Single game
Rank	Player	Ints	Year	Opponent
1	Howard Ector	3	1937	Vanderbilt
	Bobby Moorhead	3	1952	Auburn
	Bubba Hoats	3	1969	Georgia
	Randy Rhino	3	1972	Rice
	Ken Swilling	3	1989	Boston College
	Brian Wilkins	3	1996	Florida State

=== Tackles ===
Career
Rank	Player	Tackles	Years
1	Keith Brooking	467	1994 1995 1996 1997
2	Jerrelle Williams	437	1989 1990 1991 1992
3	Ron Rogers	435	1994 1995 1996 1997
4	Lucius Sanford	433	1974 1975 1976 1977
5	Rob Horton	432	1980 1981 1982 1983
6	Duane Wood	426	1979 1980 1981 1982
7	Ted Roof	417	1982 1983 1984 1985
8	Joe Harris	415	1972 1973 1974
9	Jamal Cox	397	1991 1992 1993 1994
10	Mackel Harris	390	1976 1977 1978 1979

Single season
Rank	Player	Tackles	Year
1	Joe Harris	188	1974
2	Duane Wood	171	1980
3	Eric Thomas	159	1989
4	Keyaron Fox	155	2003
5	Rob Horton	150	1981
6	Keith Brooking	147	1996
7	Jamal Cox	146	1994
	Keith Brooking	146	1995
9	Jerrelle Williams	145	1989
	Jerrelle Williams	145	1990
	Ron Rogers	145	1995

Single game
Rank	Player	Tackles	Year	Opponent
1	Rob Horton	22	1981	Alabama
	Jamal Cox	22	1994	Arizona
3	Ron Rogers	21	1995	Clemson
4	Rob Horton	20	1981	Navy
	Keith Brooking	20	1995	Clemson

=== Sacks ===
Career
Rank	Player	Sacks	Years
1	Jeremiah Attaochu	31.5	2010 2011 2012 2013
2	Greg Gathers	31.0	1999 2000 2001 2002
3	Coleman Rudolph	28.5	1989 1990 1991 1992
4	Marco Coleman	27.5	1989 1990 1991
5	Eric Henderson	25.0	2002 2003 2004 2005
6	Pat Swilling	23.0	1982 1983 1984 1985
7	Felipe Claybrooks	20.0	1997 1998 1999 2000
8	Derrick Morgan	19.5	2007 2008 2009
9	Michael Johnson	19.0	2005 2006 2007 2008
10	Philip Wheeler	18.5	2003 2004 2005 2006 2007

Single season
Rank	Player	Sacks	Year
1	Pat Swilling	15.0	1985
2	Coleman Rudolph	13.0	1991
	Greg Gathers	13.0	2000
4	Marco Coleman	12.5	1990
	Derrick Morgan	12.5	2009
	Jeremiah Attaochu	12.5	2013
7	Eric Henderson	11.0	2003
8	Marco Coleman	10.0	1991
	Felipe Claybrooks	10.0	1998
	Greg Gathers	10.0	2001
	Jeremiah Attaochu	10.0	2012

Single game
Rank	Player	Sacks	Year	Opponent
1	Marco Coleman	5.0	1990	Maryland
	Pat Swilling	5.0	1985	N.C. State
3	Jeremiah Attaochu	4.0	2013	Georgia
	Kyle Kennard	4.0	2023	Wake Forest

== Kicking ==
=== Field goals made ===
Career
Rank	Player	FGs	Years
1	Aidan Birr	63	2023 2024 2025 2026
2	Travis Bell	61	2004 2005 2006 2007
3	Scott Sisson	60	1989 1990 1991 1992
4	Luke Manget	54	1999 2000 2001 2002
5	Harrison Butker	43	2013 2014 2015 2016
6	Scott Blair	41	2007 2008 2009 2010
7	David Bell	32	1983 1984 1985 1986
8	Ron Rice	29	1980 1981 1982 1983
9	Johnny Smith	28	1977 1978 1979 1980
	Thomas Palmer	28	1985 1986 1987 1988

Single season
Rank	Player	FGs	Year
1	Aidan Birr	25	2025
2	Travis Bell	23	2007
3	Scott Sisson	19	1992
	Luke Manget	19	2001
5	Dan Burnett	17	2003
	Aidan Birr	17	2023
7	Thomas Palmer	15	1988
	Scott Sisson	15	1989
	Scott Sisson	15	1990
	Travis Bell	15	2004
	Scott Blair	15	2010
	Harrison Butker	15	2016
	Aidan Birr	15	2024

Single game
Rank	Player	FGs	Year	Opponent
1	Ron Rice	5	1982	The Citadel
2	Cam Bonifay	4	1973	Navy
	Scott Sisson	4	1992	Florida State
	Luke Manget	4	2001	Clemson
	Travis Bell	4	2007	Notre Dame
	Scott Blair	4	2009	Clemson
	Harrison Butker	4	2016	Kentucky
	Gavin Stewart	4	2022	Pittsburgh

=== Field goal percentage ===
Career
Rank	Player	FG%	Years
1	Aidan Birr	81.4%	2023 2024 2025
2	Brent Cimaglia	73.3%	2021
3	Scott Blair	73.2%	2007 2008 2009 2010
4	Travis Bell	72.6%	2004 2005 2006 2007
5	Harrison Butker	71.7%	2013 2014 2015 2016
6	Luke Manget	70.1%	1999 2000 2001 2002
7	Gavin Stewart	70.0%	2020 2021 2022 2023
8	David Bell	69.6%	1983 1984 1985 1986
9	Scott Sisson	68.2%	1989 1990 1991 1992
10	Dan Burnett	68.0%	2000 2001 2002 2003

Single season
Rank	Player	FG%	Year
1	Gavin Stewart	92.3%	2022
2	Aidan Birr	89.5%	2023
3	Travis Bell	88.2%	2004
	Scott Blair	88.2%	2010
	Harrison Butker	88.2%	2016
6	David Bell	86.7%	1984
7	Aidan Birr	86.2%	2025
8	Travis Bell	82.1%	2007
9	Dan Burnett	81.0%	2003
10	Cam Bonifay	80.0%	1973
