= Eddie McAshan =

American football player (born 1951)

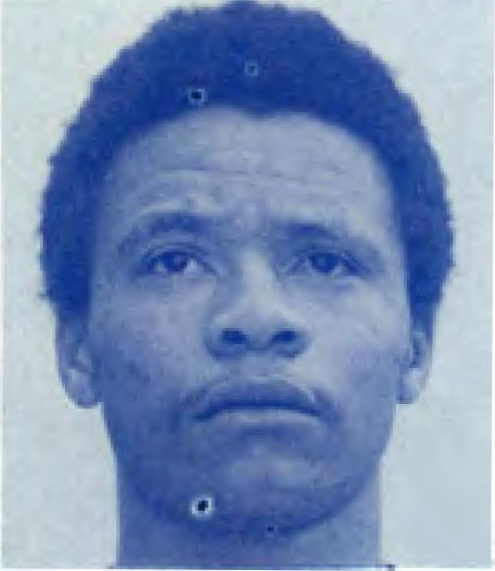
- McAshan in 1973

No. 1
- Position: Quarterback

Personal information
- Born: January 21, 1951 (age 75); Gainesville, Florida, U.S.

Career information
- College: Georgia Tech
- NFL draft: 1973: 17th round, 420th overall pick

Career history
- 1973: New England Patriots
- 1974: Jacksonville Sharks

Edward McAshan III (born January 21, 1951) is a former college football player. He was a successful college quarterback for Georgia Tech and became one of the most famous athletes in college football history for being the first African American to start at quarterback for a major Southeastern university.

== Early life ==
McAshan was born on January 21, 1951. He grew up in Gainesville, Florida and attended Gainesville High School.

McAshan began his football career as the first African American quarterback to play for the predominantly white Gainesville High School. Between 1966 and 1968, he threw for 61 touchdowns, which earned him a position in the top 20 for all-time Florida career touchdowns. His high school quarterbacking was good enough to be noticed by Georgia Tech head coach Bud Carson.

== College career ==
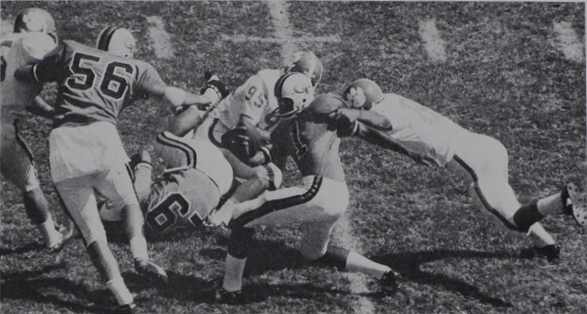
McAshan is tackled during the October 3, 1970, game against the Clemson Tigers.

McAshan would become the first African American football player to start for Georgia Tech, and the second African American quarterback in the Southeast, after Freddie Summers at Wake Forest in 1967. Carson started McAshan in 1970 as a sophomore and McAshan would go on to set several career records for Georgia Tech (which have since been broken by Shawn Jones and Joe Hamilton). McAshan's first career start was on September 12, 1970, against South Carolina. His start marked the second time that an African American had ever started at quarterback for a major Southeastern university and McAshan did not disappoint. He rallied Tech with a fourth quarter deficit, defeating the Gamecocks 23-20 with two late touchdown drives.

Over McAshan's career, he passed for 32 touchdowns. His most notable single game performance came against Rice in 1972 when he threw 5 touchdown passes. In this game he also threw five interceptions, so the game ended in a tie. Over the years of McAshan's quarterbacking, Georgia Tech would ramble and wreck off a 22-13-1 record.

McAshan was the first scholarship African American for Tech while the first walk-on African American football player at Tech was defensive back/returner Karl "PeeWee" Barnes who lettered in 1971-72. The second scholarship player was running back Greg Horne from Atlanta and the third was linebacker Joe Harris, an eventual NFL career player. Harris still holds the single season record for tackles in a season at 188.

McAshan was noted for feats of great athleticism and composure. In 1972, Georgia Tech played Tennessee in Atlanta. McAshan had suffered a poor outing with 5 interceptions but one moment stood out in the game for Tech fans. Tech had finally put a drive together and made it to the UT 20 yard line. McAshan took the snap from center and dropped back to pass. As he was preparing to throw, a Tennessee defender pressed his throwing arm into his chest so McAshan switched the ball to his other hand and threw to an open tailback in the end zone. The tailback, who had given up on the play after seeing the almost sack, dropped the wide open touchdown. The game ended in a 34-3 loss for Georgia Tech. McAshan was also notorious for throwing interceptions, setting a GT record of 51 career interceptions, which was not broken until 2006 by Reggie Ball.

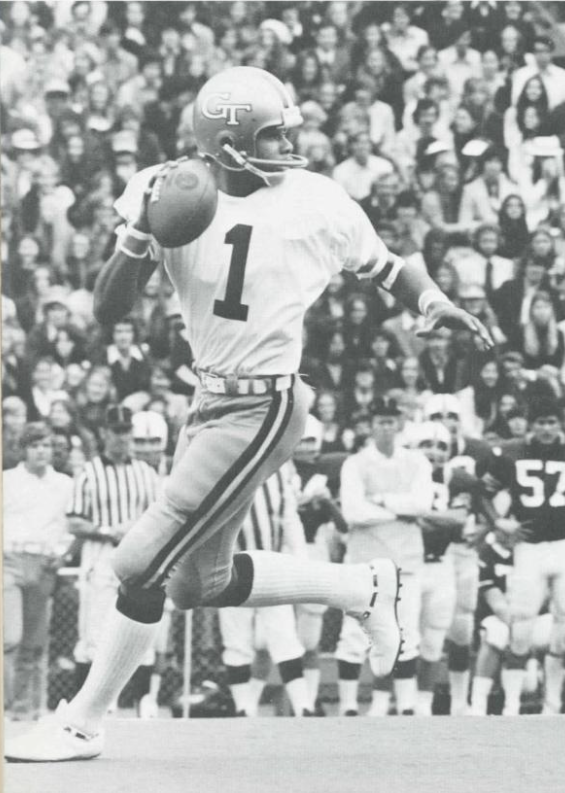
McAshan during the 1972 season

In 1972, Bud Carson was fired from Georgia Tech and new head coach, Bill Fulcher and offensive coordinator, Steve Sloan, instituted a new offensive scheme to match the capabilities of the upcoming varsity players. McAshan and the offense slowly adapted to the new scheme under the patient encouragement of Steve Sloan. McAshan's football relationship, as was the same with his defensive colleagues, with new head coach Bill Fulcher was strained for the remainder of the season after this lopsided loss. The Tuesday before the final game of the 1972 season with the University of Georgia, McAshan asked Fulcher's secretary for four additional tickets so his family could attend the game in Athens. His secretary, following NCAA rules and denied the request. In protest, under the guidance of black city father's, McAshan skipped practice for the rest of the week. Fulcher suspended McAshan for the next two games, which were the Georgia loss and the Liberty Bowl victory over Iowa State. During the Liberty Bowl in Memphis, McAshan sat in a white limousine with Jesse Jackson right outside the stadium. McAshan was eventually kicked off the team by Fulcher and declared for the National Football League draft as a senior in 1972. Eddie McAshan finished his Georgia Tech career with 4,262 yards of offense, 35 total touchdowns, a 62.5% (20-12-1) winning percentage, and two bowl game appearances.

== Professional career ==
McAshan went on to be drafted by the New England Patriots in the 17th round as the 420th pick overall in the 1973 NFL draft. He was eventually cut and he attempted a stint with the Jacksonville Sharks of the World Football League. He saw action during the 1974 season.

McAshan returned to Georgia Tech and completed his degree in industrial management in 1979.

== See also ==
- List of Georgia Tech Yellow Jackets starting quarterbacks
- Georgia Tech Yellow Jackets football statistical leaders
