= TaQuon Marshall =

American football player (born 1996)

Current position
- Title: Assistant wide receivers coach
- Team: Georgia State
- Conference: Sun Belt

Biographical details
- Born: September 20, 1996 (age 30); Columbus, Georgia, U.S.
- Education: Harris County (Hamilton, Georgia)

Playing career
- 2015–2018: Georgia Tech
- 2020: TSL Blues
- Positions: Quarterback, Wide Receiver

Coaching career (HC unless noted)
- 2021-2023: Alpharetta HS (GA) (assistant WR)
- 2024-present: Georgia State (assistant WR)

TaQuon Cartorius Marshall (born September 20, 1996) is an American football coach and former player. He is the assistant wide receivers coach for Georgia State University, a position he has held since 2024. He played college football for the Georgia Tech Yellow Jackets from 2015 to 2018, serving as the team's starting quarterback in his last two seasons.

== Early life ==
Marshall was born on September 20, 1996, in Columbus, Georgia. He played high school football at Harris County High School in his hometown of Hamilton, Georgia, where he played quarterback in his junior and senior year. While there, he passed for 1,376 yards and had 1,436 rushing yards, with 30 touchdowns overall. He was recruited by Georgia Tech in 2015 as an all-purpose athlete, accepting their offer.

== College career ==
=== Freshman season ===
In his freshman season with the Yellow Jackets, Marshall was placed in the A-back position as part of head coach Paul Johnson's triple option. In his first game with the Jackets, a 69–6 win against Alcorn State, Marshall rushed for 18 yards on one carry and caught a pass for 24 yards. In total, Marshall played in 9 games in his freshman season, with eight carries for 58 yards and 3 passes for 76 yards.

=== Sophomore season ===
Marshall served as the 3rd string quarterback for the 2016 season, throwing one completion in two attempts and taking 14 snaps. He appeared in 2 games.

=== Junior season ===
Prior to the first game of the season, Johnson announced that Marshall would be the Jackets' starting quarterback, replacing Justin Thomas, who had graduated following the 2016 season. Marshall made his debut as Tech's starting quarterback at the 2017 Chick-fil-A Kickoff Game. In the game, a 42–41 double overtime loss to the Tennessee Volunteers, Marshall set multiple school and conference records in rushing. He broke Georgia Tech's record for rushing touchdowns in a single game (5) and broke the ACC record for most rushing yards by a quarterback in a single game (249). Marshall ended the season with 1,146 rushing yards over 247 carries, 927 passing yards, and 27 total touchdowns.

=== Senior season ===
Entering into his senior season, Marshall was placed on the watchlist for the Maxwell Award alongside fellow Yellow Jacket KirVonte Benson. In his final season with the Jackets, Marshall would start in six of the first seven games, with Tobias Oliver as a backup quarterback. Following an injury sustained in a game against the Duke Blue Devils, Marshall sat out the next game against the Virginia Tech Hokies, leaving Oliver to start. Marshall would later be benched due to injuries during a game against the North Carolina Tar Heels.

== Professional career ==
Following the end of his collegiate career, Marshall transitioned to the wide receiver position and participated in Tech's pro day. In April 2019, he was invited to attend a mini-camp with the Baltimore Ravens, and the next month he participated in a mini-camp with the Atlanta Falcons.

Marshall was selected by the Blues of The Spring League during its player selection draft on October 10, 2020.

== See also ==
- List of Georgia Tech Yellow Jackets starting quarterbacks
- Georgia Tech Yellow Jackets football statistical leaders
