= A. J. Suggs =

American football player (born 1980)

Profile
- Position: Quarterback

Personal information
- Born: December 8, 1980 (age 45); Powder Springs, Georgia, U.S.
- Listed height: 6 ft 4 in (1.93 m)
- Listed weight: 215 lb (98 kg)

Career information
- College: Georgia Tech
- NFL draft: 2004: undrafted

Career history
- 1999–2001: Tennessee
- 2002–2003: Georgia Tech

Aaron Joseph "A. J." Suggs (born December 8, 1980) was the starting quarterback for Georgia Tech in the 2002 season, and for the University of Tennessee during portions of the 2000 season. Suggs went to McEachern High School and graduated from Georgia Tech with a B.S. degree from the College of Management in 2004.

== Early years ==
Suggs was a four-year starter for the high school football team at McEachern High School in Powder Springs, Georgia. He earned many honors including All-State, All-Region, All-District, and AP Player of the Year for the state of Georgia. After his senior season, he was named to the SuperPrep All-American team.

== College career ==
Suggs started his career at the University of Tennessee under head coach Phillip Fulmer. He was given a redshirt season in 1999. In 2000, he started four games for the Volunteers and played in three others, completing 53.8 percent of his passes for 785 yards, with five touchdowns and three interceptions. His best game came against LSU where he had 319 passing yards and three touchdowns. He was initially sharing playing time with sophomore Joey Mathews but both ultimately lost out to freshman Casey Clausen.

Suggs transferred to Georgia Tech in 2001 and ushered in the new Chan Gailey regime, being the first skill position player to play for Gailey who was not recruited by previous coach George O'Leary. Due to eligibility transfer rules, he had to sit out the 2001 season. During that time, he apprenticed under former star quarterback George Godsey and eventual Delaware transfer Andy Hall.

In 2002, Suggs posted a 7–6 record as a starter, throwing 12 touchdowns, 15 interceptions, 2,142 passing yards, and completed 57.3% of his passes. Suggs's last start was in 2002 against Fresno State University in the Silicon Valley Bowl. He was taken out of the game in favor of redshirt freshman Damarius Bilbo.

Suggs's most notable game was a victory on November 2, 2002, in Raleigh, North Carolina. Georgia Tech was 5–3 headed to face a #10 and 9–0 N.C. State squad led by All-American quarterback Philip Rivers. Suggs led the Yellow Jackets past N.C. State by a score of 24–17 with a dramatic fourth quarter rally that ended Rivers's Heisman hopes and N.C. State's national title run. Suggs passed for 211 yards and a touchdown in the victory.

Suggs lost the starting job in 2003 to true freshman quarterback Reggie Ball. Ball started every game but two for the next four years. Suggs's main playing time as a senior in 2003 came in a loss to Georgia after Ball was injured and in a rout of the Tulsa in the Humanitarian Bowl.

== See also ==
- List of Georgia Tech Yellow Jackets starting quarterbacks
- Georgia Tech Yellow Jackets football statistical leaders
