= Tevin Washington =

American football player (born 1990)

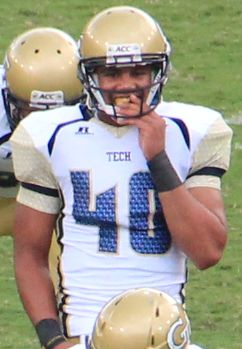
- Washington in 2012, wearing the number 40

No. 13
- Position: Quarterback

Personal information
- Born: May 19, 1990 (age 36); Montgomery, Alabama, U.S.
- Listed height: 6 ft 0 in (1.83 m)
- Listed weight: 205 lb (93 kg)

Career information
- High school: Wetumpka
- College: Georgia Tech (2008–2012)
- Stats at ESPN

Tevin Washington (born May 19, 1990) is an American former college football player. He played as a quarterback for the Georgia Tech Yellow Jackets from 2009 to 2012. Washington came to the Georgia Institute of Technology after a successful prep career in Alabama. He became a starter for Georgia Tech as a redshirt sophomore after Joshua Nesbitt was injured during 2010 football season, and emerged as a dual-threat quarterback.

== Early life ==
Washington played four years of high school football, including two as a team captain, under coach Chad Anderson at Wetumpka High School. Washington led Wetumpka to a 10–2 record in 2007 as a senior. Washington passed for more than 200 yards five times as a senior, and he also rushed for 1,088 yards and 14 touchdowns. Washington's high school career totals include 5,042 yards passing, 2,097 yards rushing, 42 passing touchdowns and 25 rushing touchdowns. Washington's high school honors include: first team class 6A all-state, two-time member of the Montgomery Advertiser all-metro team, and he earned all-county honors three times.

== College career ==
Washington became starting quarterback for Georgia Tech on November 4, 2010 after Joshua Nesbitt was injured during a football game against Virginia Tech. Nesbitt threw a late interception and then broke his arm trying to tackle the defender carrying the errant pass. The Jackets lost that game 28–21, but Washington, who had risen to the backup spot after Jaybo Shaw transferred earlier in the year, held his own. He led a fourth-quarter touchdown drive to tie the game at 21 and then drove Tech in the final minutes to the Hokies’ 16-yard line, where his pass into the end zone was intercepted with eight seconds remaining, ending the game. Washington then faced the University of Miami for the first time as a starter on November 13, 2010. Washington played four games as Georgia Tech's starting quarterback to finish out the 2010 football season. The Yellow Jackets won only one of those games which was against Duke on November 20, 2010. However, during those four games, Washington gained valuable experience, and he helped lead the Yellow Jackets to 6–0 start during the first half of the 2011 football season.

External image
- GT vs. Clemson 10/29/11

Georgia Tech won only two of the next seven games to finish out the 2011 football season, which included a win over the Clemson Tigers on October 29, 2011 at Bobby Dodd Stadium. Clemson was then ranked nationally No. 5, and the Tigers suffered their first defeat of the season at the hands of the Yellow Jackets. Washington led the Yellow Jackets to a 31–17 upset victory by rushing for 176 yards on 27 carries and a touchdown, which was the most rushing yards ever by a Georgia Tech quarterback. In addition, Clemson's offense was almost completely shutdown by Georgia Tech's defense in the first half, and the Tigers were plagued by turnovers, which contributed to the win for the Yellow Jackets.

Georgia Tech had 2–4 record through the first half of the 2012 football season, including overtime losses to Virginia Tech and Miami. Georgia Tech also lost to Middle Tennessee State and Clemson, which led to the firing of defensive coordinator Al Groh. Lost in the chaos of the season was the performance of Washington. After a three-game losing streak, Georgia Tech head coach Paul Johnson came to Washington's defense by saying: "Tevin Washington is not the problem." Through the first six games of the season, Washington had rushed 94 times for 408 yards and 13 touchdowns. He also had completed 49 of 78 passing attempts for 804 yards and four touchdowns with only two interceptions. However, while the offense generated 95 points during the three-game losing streak, the offense was not consistent throughout each game. The offense failed to score in the fourth quarter against Miami and scored only seven points in the second half against Middle Tennessee State. Also, the Yellow Jackets scored only seven second-half points against Clemson and failed to score during two red-zone possessions during that game.

Washington shared the quarterback position with Vad Lee during the 2012 season, who saw only limited playing time until Georgia Tech faced North Carolina on November 10. Lee entered the game at Kenan Memorial Stadium with Tech trailing North Carolina 14–7 in the first quarter, and he never left. Lee made Georgia Tech's triple option offense unstoppable, helping the Yellow Jackets account for 588 yards of offense in a 68–50 win over North Carolina, the most combined points ever in any Atlantic Coast Conference football game. However, coach Paul Johnson continued to start Washington in every football game during 2012 season, and he rotated the two quarterbacks with their playing time depending on performance during games.

External image
- GT vs. Duke 11/17/12

Even though Washington nearly let his starting job slip away, the Yellow Jackets' starter was the star of the show against the Duke Blue Devils on November 17, 2012. During that game, Washington threw for three touchdowns and ran for another. Washington led the Jackets to 449 total yards of offense. Washington also set an ACC and school record for rushing touchdowns by a quarterback when he went into the end zone in the first quarter. Washington set the record when he capped a 13-play drive with his 1-yard scoring run on Georgia Tech's first possession, which was his 36th rushing touchdown. Josh Nesbitt previously held the old record of 35 for the Yellow Jackets. Coach Johnson said after the game, "Tevin was more of the hot hand, so we left him in." Washington's performance during that game helped Georgia Tech beat Duke 42–24, a key victory which clinched the ACC Coastal Division title for the Yellow Jackets. Georgia Tech also won three straight games to become bowl-eligible for the 16th consecutive season.

Washington completed coursework for a bachelor's degree in management during summer of 2012. Washington graduated shortly after the Yellow Jackets finished their first practice of fall camp. Washington was the first Georgia Tech quarterback to play as a graduate student since George Godsey in 2001. Washington could have left himself just one class during 2012 football season had he not finished his degree requirements over the summer. However, Washington had promised his family that he would graduate in four years and he wanted to honor that promise.

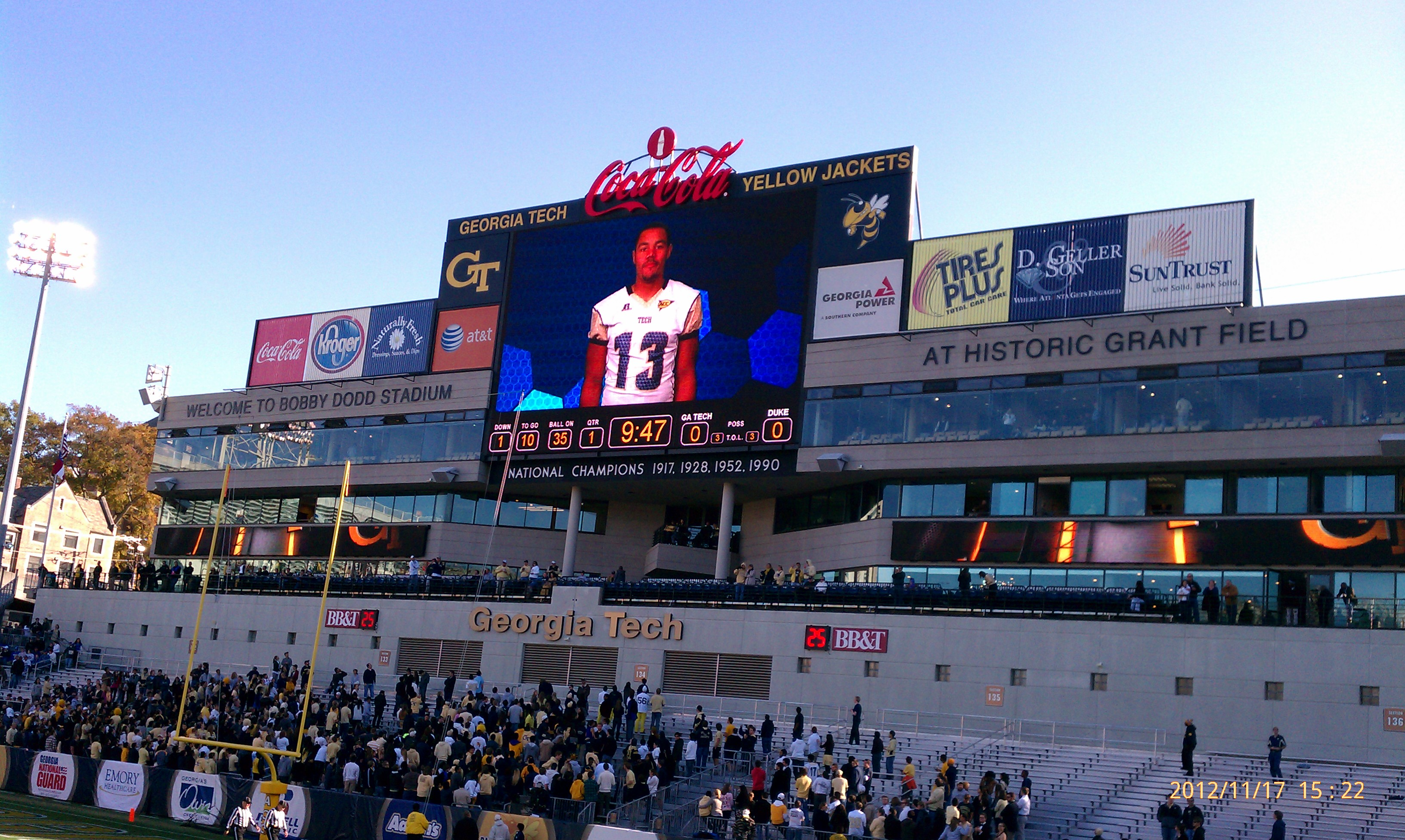
Washington on big screen at Bobby Dodd Stadium on Senior Day, November 17, 2012

=== Statistics ===
	Passing						Rushing		
Year*	Attempts	Comps	Comp %	Yards	TD	Int	Attempts	Yards	TD
2009	1	1	100%	21	0	0	6	40	0
2010	61	25	41.0%	417	2	3	116	514	4
2011	150	74	49.3%	1,652	11	8	243	987	14
2012	133	75	56.4%	1,222	8	4	177	684	20
Total	345	175	50.7%	3,312	21	15	542	2,225	38

- Note: Washington redshirted in 2008.

== See also ==
- List of Georgia Tech Yellow Jackets starting quarterbacks
- Georgia Tech Yellow Jackets football statistical leaders
- 2010 Georgia Tech Yellow Jackets football team
- 2011 Georgia Tech Yellow Jackets football team
- 2012 Georgia Tech Yellow Jackets football team
