= 1996 Georgia Tech Yellow Jackets football team =

American college football season

1996 Georgia Tech Yellow Jackets football
- Conference: Atlantic Coast Conference
- Record: 5–6 (4–4 ACC)
- Head coach: George O'Leary (3rd season)
- Offensive coordinator: Pat Watson (2nd season)
- Defensive coordinator: Dave Huxtable (1st season)
- Home stadium: Bobby Dodd Stadium

1996 Atlantic Coast Conference football standings
	Conf.			Overall
Team	W		L	W		L
No. 3 Florida State $	8	–	0	11	–	1
No. 10 North Carolina	6	–	2	10	–	2
Clemson	6	–	2	7	–	5
Virginia	5	–	3	7	–	5
Georgia Tech	4	–	4	5	–	6
Maryland	3	–	5	5	–	6
NC State	3	–	5	3	–	8
Wake Forest	1	–	7	3	–	8
Duke	0	–	8	0	–	11
$ – Conference champion; Rankings from AP Poll

The 1996 Georgia Tech Yellow Jackets football team represented Georgia Tech as member of the Atlantic Coast Conference (ACC) during the 1996 NCAA Division I-A football season. Led by third-year head coach George O'Leary, the Yellow Jackets compiled an overall record of 5–6 with a mark of 4–4 in conference play, placing fifth in the ACC. Georgia Tech played home games at Bobby Dodd Stadium in Atlanta.

== Schedule ==
Date	Time	Opponent	Rank	Site	TV	Result	Attendance	Source
September 7	12:00 pm	at NC State		Carter–Finley Stadium; Raleigh, NC	ABC	W 28–16	41,500	
September 14	7:00 pm	Wake Forest		Bobby Dodd Stadium; Atlanta, GA		W 30–10	45,750	
September 21	3:30 pm	at No. 11 North Carolina		Kenan Memorial Stadium; Chapel Hill, NC	ABC	L 0–16	50,000	
September 26	8:00 pm	Duke		Bobby Dodd Stadium; Atlanta, GA	ESPN	W 48–22	44,145	
October 5	3:30 pm	No. 12 Virginia		Bobby Dodd Stadium; Atlanta, GA	ABC	W 13–7	44,900	
October 19	3:30 pm	at Clemson	No. 22	Memorial Stadium; Clemson, SC (rivalry)	ABC	L 25–28	70,578	
October 26	1:00 pm	UCF*		Bobby Dodd Stadium; Atlanta, GA		W 27–20	43,610	
November 2	7:00 pm	No. 3 Florida State		Bobby Dodd Stadium; Atlanta, GA	ESPN	L 3–49	46,311	
November 14	8:00 pm	at Maryland		Byrd Stadium; College Park, MD	ESPN	L 10–13	22,510	
November 23	1:00 pm	Navy*		Bobby Dodd Stadium; Atlanta, GA		L 26–36	44,415	
November 30	3:30 pm	at Georgia*		Sanford Stadium; Athens, GA (Clean, Old-Fashioned Hate)	CBS	L 10–19	78,062	
*Non-conference game; Rankings from AP Poll released prior to the game; All times are in Eastern time

== Rankings ==
Ranking movements Legend: ██ Increase in ranking ██ Decrease in ranking — = Not ranked
	Week																	
Poll	Pre	1	2	3	4	5	6	7	8	9	10	11	12	13	14	15	16	Final
AP	—	—	—	—	—	—	—	23	22	—	—	—	—	—	—	—	—	—
Coaches	—		—	—	—	—	—	—	24	—	—	—	—	—	—	—	—	—

== Roster ==
1996 Georgia Tech Yellow Jackets football team roster
Players
Coaches
Offense

Pos.	#	Name	Class
QB	1	Quincy Carter	Fr
FL	2	Trotter Hunt	So
TB	3	Charlie Rogers	So
FL	9	Derrick Steagall	Sr
QB	10	Brandon Shaw	So
QB	14	Joe Hamilton	Fr
FL	15	Dexter Stallworth	Sr
QB	18	Alex Thompson	So
FB	20	Curtis Hollomon	So
FB	21	Chris Haney	Sr
TB	22	T. J. Johnson	Jr
TB	23	C. J. Williams	Jr
OT	59	Curtis McGee	Sr
OT	61	John Grantham	Jr
OL	61	Michael Bledsoe	Fr
OT	62	Steve Jackson	Sr
OL	63	Bill Madigan	Fr
G	64	Ken Celaj	Jr
OL	65	Chris Brown	Fr
G	66	Kevin Knapp	Fr
OL	67	Dan Mitchell	Fr
G	69	Marc Westmoreland	Sr
OL	70	Brent Key	Fr
OL	71	Noah King	Fr
C	72	Jim Kercher	Sr
OL	73	Jason Burks	Fr
G	74	Michael Minter	Sr
OL	75	Tim Castro	Fr
OT	76	Yoel Molina	Sr
C	77	Abe Fernandez	So
C	78	Craig Page	So
SE	81	Harvey Middleton	Jr
TE	82	Mike Lillie	Fr
WR	83	Titus Nelson	Fr
WR	84	David Powell	Fr
WR	85	Brett Basquin	Fr
FL	85	Jacob Smrekar	Jr
TE	86	Grant Baynham	Sr
TE	88	Joe Perdoni	Fr

Defense

Pos.	#	Name	Class
CB	4	Jason Bostic	So
CB	32	Nate Perryman	Sr
LB	5	Chris Edwards	Fr
SS	8	Mike Dee	Sr
FS	16	Brian Wilkins	So
DB	24	Derrick Dudley	Fr
DB	25	Troy Tolbert	Fr
FS	26	Travares Tillman	Fr
FS	27	Jerry Caldwell	So
LB	28	Jimmy Clements	Sr
SS	29	Gary Joseph	Jr
DB	30	Reggie Wilcox	Fr
FS	30	Robert Nelson	So
LB	35	Keith Brooking	Jr
LB	49	Edwin Ferguson	So
LB	50	Ron Rogers	Jr
DE	52	Conrad Andrzejewski	Fr
NG	54	Roderrick Roberts	So
LB	55	Delaunta Cameron	So
DT	56	Nate Stimson	So
LB	58	Justin Robertson	So
LB	60	Chris Lee	Jr
DE	68	DeShaan Simmons	So
DT	79	Patrick Bradford	Jr
NG	90	Kamal Balogun	Sr
DT	92	Derrick Shepard	Jr
DL	93	Tony Robinson	Fr
NG	94	Dan Witherspoon	Jr
DE	95	Jermaine Miles	Sr
DE	97	Felipe Claybrooks	Fr

Special teams

Pos.	#	Name	Class
P	2	Rodney Williams	So
K	11	Chris Leone	Sr

Head coach

- George O'Leary

Coordinators/assistant coaches

- Pat Watson – Offensive coordinator/offensive line
- Eddie Wilson – Quarterbacks
- Bob Casullo – Running backs/special teams
- Stan Hixon – Wide receivers
- Doug Marrone – Tight ends
- Dave Huxtable – Defensive coordinator/inside linebacker
- Lance Thompson – Defensive ends/recruiting coordinator
- Larry New – Defensive line/assistant head coach
- John Anselmo – Defensive backs

Legend

- (C) Team captain
- (S) Suspended
- (I) Ineligible
- Injured
- Redshirt

Roster
Last update: 1996-12-29
