= Jeff Sims =

American football player (born 2002)

Profile
- Position: Quarterback

Personal information
- Born: January 1, 2002 (age 24)
- Listed height: 6 ft 4 in (1.93 m)
- Listed weight: 222 lb (101 kg)

Career information
- High school: Sandalwood (Jacksonville, Florida)
- College: Georgia Tech (2020–2022); Nebraska (2023); Arizona State (2024–2025)
- NFL draft: 2026: undrafted
- Stats at ESPN

Jeff Sims (born January 1, 2002) is an American football quarterback. He played college football for the Georgia Tech Yellow Jackets, the Nebraska Cornhuskers, and the Arizona State Sun Devils.

== Early life ==
Sims played high school football for Sandalwood High School in Jacksonville, Florida from 2016 to 2020. He served as the team's starting quarterback starting in his sophomore year. He initially hoped to play college football for the Miami Hurricanes. The team showed no interest in him, and instead he was drawn toward the Florida State Seminoles under then-head coach Willie Taggart. He committed to Florida State in February 2019, with the prospect of being a backup quarterback to James Blackman. He competed in the Elite 11 quarterback competition later that year. Florida State fired Taggart and hired Mike Norvell as the new head coach. Sims rescinded his commitment to Florida State on December 11. He signed a letter of intent for the Georgia Tech Yellow Jackets on December 18. Sims received more than a dozen offers from schools in the NCAA Division I Football Bowl Subdivision, including Florida State, Georgia Tech, and the Maryland Terrapins. 247Sports.com ranked him the No. 10 dual-threat quarterback in the country and the No. 223 recruit overall. In January 2020, he played in the Under Armour All-America Game, a high school football all-star game, where he was part of the winning team.

Sims's uncle, Mike Sims-Walker, is a former football player who played in the National Football League for the Jacksonville Jaguars.

== College career ==
=== Georgia Tech ===
Following the team's 2019 season, quarterback Tobias Oliver was moved to cornerback, leaving that position empty, with Sims, Tucker Gleason, James Graham, and Jordan Yates vying for the position during the offseason. Graham and Sims were considered the strongest candidates for the position, though the team refused to comment prior to the start of the season. On September 11, The Atlanta Journal-Constitution announced that Sims would be the team's starting quarterback. He made his collegiate start on September 12, leading the Yellow Jackets to a 16–13 upset victory against the Florida State Seminoles at Doak Campbell Stadium. Sims completed 24 of 35 passes for 277 passing yards and accumulated 64 rushing yards. With the game, Sims became the first true freshman quarterback to play in a season opener for the Yellow Jackets since Reggie Ball in 2003 and the first to win a season opener. For his performance, Sims was named Atlantic Coast Conference (ACC) rookie of the week and 247Sports.com's true freshman of the week, and he was recognized in weekly lists put out by the Davey O'Brien Award and the Manning Award. Following this debut, the Yellow Jackets suffered two defeats, losing 49–21 to the UCF Knights and 37–20 to the Syracuse Orange. In the latter game, Sims threw four interceptions.

Sims showed some improvement in his sophomore campaign, throwing for 1,468 yards, 12 touchdowns, and 7 interceptions - along with 372 rushing yards and 4 touchdowns in 5 starts. However, he shared the role of starting quarterback with freshman Jordan Yates, as the Yellow Jackets finished with a 3-9 record and once again missed out on bowl eligibility. On November 27, 2022, Sims announced his decision to enter the transfer portal.

=== Nebraska ===
On December 18, 2022, Sims announced his commitment to Nebraska Cornhuskers.

On December 11, 2023, he announced that he would be entering the transfer portal for the second time.

=== Arizona State ===
On May 1, 2024, Sims announced that he would transfer to Arizona State. On August 19, 2024, head coach Kenny Dillingham announced Michigan State transfer Sam Leavitt would be the starting quarterback for opening game of the 2024 season with Sims as his backup.

Sims made his Sun Devils debut in the season opener against Wyoming where he recorded 15 yards on three carries. In week 6, he recorded his first rushing touchdown as a Sun Devil in a victory against Utah. Due to an injury of starting quarterback Sam Leavitt, Sims made his first start of the season the following week against Cincinnati. In the 2024 Big 12 Championship Game, he recorded 31 rushing yards on six carries as the Sun Devils defeated Iowa State. On the season, he appeared in four games (one start) and was 13 of 25 passing for 168 yards. He recorded 101 rushing yards on 24 carries and one touchdown.

In 2025, Sims began the season as the backup quarterback. In week 6, he started against Utah in replace of injured starting quarterback Leavitt. In week 8, he replaced Leavitt who suffered a season ending injury against Houston. In relief, Sims threw his first Sun Devils touchdown pass on a 27-yard score to Chamon Metayer.

In week 9 against Iowa State, Sims ran for a career high 228 yards on 29 carries and two touchdowns in a 24–19 victory. He had 405 total yards of offense, including a 88-yard touchdown run. His 228 rushing yards ranked eighth all time in Arizona State single-game history. The victory marked Sims' first win as a starting quarterback since the 2022 season at Georgia Tech.

=== Statistics ===
Season	Team	Games			Passing								Rushing			
Season	Team	GP	GS	Record	Cmp	Att	Pct	Yds	Y/A	TD	Int	Rtg	Att	Yds	Avg	TD
2020	Georgia Tech	10	10	3–7	141	257	54.9	1,881	7.3	13	13	122.9	120	492	4.1	6
2021	Georgia Tech	7	6	1–5	113	188	60.1	1,468	7.8	12	7	139.3	70	372	5.3	4
2022	Georgia Tech	7	7	3–4	110	188	58.5	1,115	5.9	5	3	113.9	87	288	3.3	1
2023	Nebraska	5	2	0–2	28	47	59.6	282	6.0	1	6	91.5	42	189	4.5	1
2024	Arizona State	4	1	0–1	13	25	52.0	168	6.7	0	0	108.4	24	101	4.2	1
2025	Arizona State	10	6	3–3	105	188	55.9	1,261	6.7	10	6	123.4	100	536	5.4	5
Career		43	32	10−22	510	893	57.1	6,175	6.9	41	35	122.5	443	1,978	4.5	18

== Professional career ==
Pre-draft measurables
Height	Weight	Arm length	Hand span	Wingspan	40-yard dash	10-yard split	20-yard split	Vertical jump	Broad jump
6 ft 3 5/8 in (1.92 m)	222 lb (101 kg)	33 1/8 in (0.84 m)	9 3/8 in (0.24 m)	6 ft 6 3/4 in (2.00 m)	4.50 s	1.53 s	2.56 s	35.5 in (0.90 m)	10 ft 11 in (3.33 m)
All values from Pro Day

In May 2026, he attended rookie minicamp with the New York Giants.

== See also ==
- List of Georgia Tech Yellow Jackets starting quarterbacks
