= Justin Thomas (American football) =

American football player (born 1994)

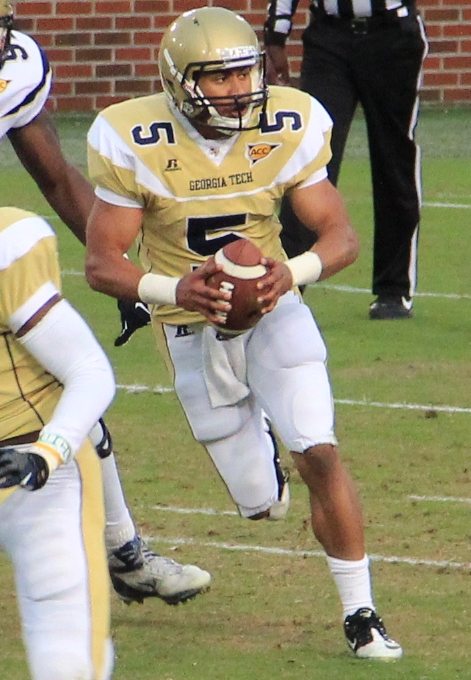
- Thomas with the Georgia Tech Yellow Jackets in 2013

No. 5, 88
- Position: Wide receiver

Personal information
- Born: March 15, 1994 (age 32); Montgomery, Alabama, U.S.
- Listed height: 5 ft 11 in (1.80 m)
- Listed weight: 189 lb (86 kg)

Career information
- High school: Prattville (Prattville, Alabama)
- College: Georgia Tech
- NFL draft: 2017: undrafted

Career history
- New Orleans Saints (2017)*; Los Angeles Rams (2017)*; Pittsburgh Steelers (2017–2018)*; Atlanta Legends (2019); Hamilton Tiger-Cats (2019)*; DC Defenders (2020)*
- * Offseason or practice squad member only
- Stats at Pro Football Reference

Justin Micheal Bryant Thomas (born March 15, 1994) is an American former professional football wide receiver. He played college football for the Georgia Tech Yellow Jackets as a quarterback and signed with the New Orleans Saints as an undrafted free agent in 2017. He was also a member of the Los Angeles Rams, Pittsburgh Steelers, Atlanta Legends, Hamilton Tiger-Cats, and DC Defenders. He is now quarterbacks coach of the Prattville Lions.

== Early life ==
Thomas attended Prattville High School in Prattville, Alabama. He played football, basketball and baseball. He helped lead the Lions to win the Alabama class 6A state football championship in 2011. Rivals.com rated him as a four-star recruit in football. He originally committed the University of Alabama to play college football but changed to Georgia Tech. He made the change due to Georgia Tech offering him a chance to play quarterback. Alabama had indicated that he would be used as a defensive back.

== College career ==
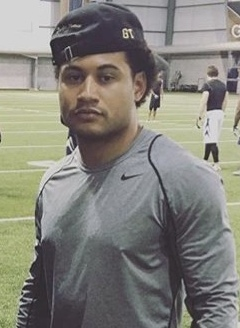
Thomas in 2016

Thomas was redshirted for his freshman season at Georgia Tech in 2012. As a redshirt freshman in 2013, he played in 10 games as a backup to Vad Lee. He completed nine of 17 passes for 131 yards and one passing touchdown and rushed for 234 yards on 33 carries and two touchdowns. Thomas took over as the starter in 2014 after Lee transferred. He went on to start all 14 games including the Orange Bowl victory against Mississippi State led by Dak Prescott. He was named the MVP of the game after he had 125 passing yards, a passing touchdown, 121 rushing yards and three rushing touchdowns. For the season, he passed for 1,719 yards and 18 touchdowns with six interceptions and rushed for 1,086 yards and eight touchdowns. The 2015 season was one that was marred by injuries. The team finished with a dismal 3–9 record. Thomas' most notable performance of the season was against then undefeated Florida State. He rushed for a 60 yard touchdown that kept the Yellow Jackets in the game, making the score 10–13. The team moved on, and Thomas lead the way to an impressive 2016 season. He led the Yellow Jackets to wins over SEC teams Vanderbilt, Kentucky, and Georgia. Thomas had a historic game against Duke, passing for 264 yards and two touchdowns, and running for 195 yards and 2 more touchdowns. The team went 9–4 on the season.

=== College statistics ===
Year	Team	Games			Passing								Rushing			
Year	Team	GP	GS	Record	Comp	Att	Pct	Yards	Avg	TD	Int	Rate	Att	Yards	Avg	TD
2012	Georgia Tech	Redshirt (redshirt)														
2013	Georgia Tech	10	0	0–0	9	17	52.9	131	7.7	1	2	113.6	33	234	7.1	2
2014	Georgia Tech	14	14	11–3	96	187	51.3	1,719	9.2	18	6	153.9	190	1,086	5.7	8
2015	Georgia Tech	12	12	3–9	75	180	41.7	1,345	7.5	13	8	119.4	145	488	3.4	6
2016	Georgia Tech	12	12	8–4	79	148	53.4	1,559	10.5	8	2	157.0	137	604	4.4	6
Career		48	38	22–16	259	532	48.7	4,754	8.9	40	18	141.8	505	2,412	4.8	22

== Professional career ==
=== New Orleans Saints ===
Thomas signed with the New Orleans Saints as an undrafted free agent after participating in the team's rookie minicamp as a defensive back and wide receiver. He was waived on July 29, 2017.

=== Los Angeles Rams ===
On August 3, 2017, Thomas signed with the Los Angeles Rams. He was waived on August 18, 2017.

=== Pittsburgh Steelers ===
On August 23, 2017, Thomas was signed by the Pittsburgh Steelers. He was waived on September 2, 2017, and was then signed to the practice squad the next day. He was released on September 20, 2017, but re-signed six days later. He was released on October 18, 2017, but was re-signed on November 6. He was released again on November 20 and re-signed on December 21. He signed a reserve/future contract with the Steelers on January 16, 2018.

On August 27, 2018, Thomas was waived by the Steelers.

=== Atlanta Legends ===
For the 2019 AAF season, Thomas signed with the Atlanta Legends. He played in seven games, starting one, during the 2019 season, catching 16 passes for 172 yards. He was waived on April 1, 2019.

=== Hamilton Tiger-Cats ===
Thomas signed with the Hamilton Tiger-Cats of the Canadian Football League on May 15, 2019 and was released on June 8. He was later signed to the team's practice roster on September 9 and was released again on October 8, 2019.

=== DC Defenders ===
In October 2019, Thomas was picked by the DC Defenders as part of the 2020 XFL draft's open phase. He was released during minicamp in December 2019.

== See also ==
- List of Georgia Tech Yellow Jackets starting quarterbacks
- Georgia Tech Yellow Jackets football statistical leaders
