= Offense-Defense All-American Bowl =

The Offense-Defense All-American Bowl is an annual high school football all-star game typically held in early January, created to spotlight the nation's top high-school seniors. The game was originally hosted in the U.S. state of Florida, but the 2009 edition was moved to the Myrtle Beach area of South Carolina.

The inaugural game was played on January 4, 2007, at Lockhart Stadium in Fort Lauderdale, Florida. The next year the game moved to the Orange Bowl in Miami. The demolition of the Orange Bowl started in March 2008 so the 2009 edition was moved to Brooks Stadium, the campus stadium of Coastal Carolina University in Conway, South Carolina.

The game is in an East versus West format, with each team made up of 40 of the best high school seniors from across the nation as determined by Rivals.com. A national player of the year award is also presented the night prior to the game. The game was originally broadcast nationally to a prime-time audience thanks to broadcast partner ESPNU. The 2009 edition was increased to 88 total players, as selected from the Offense-Defense Top 100 list, a national recruit ranking system published by Sports Illustrated. Participants included 15 players ranked in the top-100 list.

The other big high school all-star games are the U.S. Army All-American Bowl played in San Antonio, Texas and the Under Armour All-America Game played in Orlando, Florida. Because all of these games host their events during the same week, they are in competition for players. A number of marquee players have participated in the O-D competition, including Cam Newton, Dez Bryant, Aaron Corp, Kodi Burns, Jarrett Lee, et al.

== Game results ==
Date	Site	Winning team		Losing team		MVP
January 4, 2007	Lockhart Stadium - Fort Lauderdale, Florida	East	28	West	14	Cam Newton
January 4, 2008	Orange Bowl - Miami, Florida	East	12	West	8	Mike Zordich
January 2, 2009	Brooks Stadium - Conway, South Carolina	East	29	West	3	Offense: Demond Dennis; Defense: Kwame Geathers
January 2, 2010	Doug Shaw Memorial Stadium - Myrtle Beach, South Carolina	East	0	West	35	K.P. Parks
December 31, 2010	Doug Shaw Memorial Stadium - Myrtle Beach, South Carolina	East	21	West	35	Michael Carlisle
December 29, 2011	Cowboys Stadium - Arlington, Texas	East	14	West	21	Caleb Rowe
December 30, 2012	Reliant Stadium - Houston, Texas	National	20	American	9	Trent Hosick
January 3, 2014	Orlando Citrus Bowl Stadium - Orlando, Florida	National	21	American	19	Stanley Williams
