= Ray Donaldson =

American football player (born 1958)

No. 53
- Position: Center

Personal information
- Born: May 18, 1958 (age 68); Rome, Georgia, U.S.
- Listed height: 6 ft 3 in (1.91 m)
- Listed weight: 311 lb (141 kg)

Career information
- High school: East Rome (Rome)
- College: Georgia
- NFL draft: 1980: 2nd round, 32nd overall pick

Career history
- Baltimore/Indianapolis Colts (1980–1992); Seattle Seahawks (1993–1994); Dallas Cowboys (1995–1996)

Awards and highlights
- Super Bowl champion (XXX); Second-team All-Pro (1987); 6× Pro Bowl (1986–1989, 1995, 1996); Third-team All-American (1979); First-team All-SEC (1979)

Career NFL statistics
- Games played: 244
- Games started: 228
- Fumble recoveries: 5
- Stats at Pro Football Reference

Raymond Canute Donaldson (born May 18, 1958) is an American former professional football player who was a center in the National Football League (NFL) for the Baltimore/Indianapolis Colts, Seattle Seahawks and Dallas Cowboys. He played college football for the Georgia Bulldogs.

== Early life ==
Donaldson attended East Rome High School where he participated in basketball and football, playing as a linebacker, fullback and tight end. As a senior, he received High School All-American and All‐State honors. His jersey has since been retired.

He accepted a football scholarship from the University of Georgia with the intention of playing linebacker. As a sophomore, he was switched to center after the fifth game of the season because of injuries. He also played guard during his time in college.

As a senior, he was an All-American and an All-Southeastern Conference selection. He also played in the East–West Shrine Game and the Senior Bowl.

In 2006, he was inducted into the Georgia Sports Hall of Fame. In 2010, he was inducted into the Rome Sports Hall of Fame.

== Professional career ==
=== Baltimore Colts ===
Donaldson was selected by the Baltimore Colts in the second round (32nd overall) of the 1980 NFL draft. As a rookie, he was a reserve offensive lineman (center & guard), tied for fifth on the team with 9 special teams tackles.

In 1981, he was named the starting center and it is believed that he also became the first starting African American center in NFL History. He still played on the punt coverage unit, making 2 special teams tackles.

In 1983, he was named as a first alternate to the Pro Bowl, while helping the team lead the AFC with 2,695 rushing yards.

In 1986, he received his first Pro Bowl nomination. In 1987, he missed weeks 3 through 5 because of the NFLPA strike, ending a streak of 91 consecutive starts. He received his first nomination as a Pro Bowl starter. He also went to the playoffs for the only time in his career.

In 1991, he suffered a broken fibula and was lost for the season after the third game against the Los Angeles Raiders, snapping a streak of 61 consecutive games played and started since the 1987 NFLPA strike. They were also the first games in his career missed because of injury.

On February 18, 1993, he was released at the age of 35. At his retirement, he was third in team history with 184 games played. He played with the Colts for 13 years and made the Pro Bowl 4 straight seasons from 1986 to 1989. At the time, he was tied for second-place all-time for years of service with the club, trailing only Johnny Unitas' 17 seasons.

=== Seattle Seahawks ===
On April 20, 1993, Donaldson signed as a free agent with the Seattle Seahawks and anchored an offensive line that helped the team lead the AFC in rushing for the first time in franchise history with 2,015 yards. In 1994, he helped Chris Warren rank first in the AFC with 1,545 rushing yards.

=== Dallas Cowboys ===
Needing help at center after Mark Stepnoski left to the Houston Oilers, the Dallas Cowboys signed Donaldson as an unrestricted free agent on March 20, 1995. That season, he was the NFL's oldest starting center until suffering a broken right ankle and being placed on the injured reserve list, snapping a string of 60 consecutive starts. He was replaced by Derek Kennard and missed the last 4 regular-season games and all of the playoffs, including Super Bowl XXX. Donaldson contributed to the offensive line breaking a team record by allowing just 18 sacks in a season and to Emmitt Smith winning his fourth rushing title, score an NFL record 25 rushing touchdowns and gain a club record 1,773 rushing yards.

In 1996, he started 16 games in a line that led the league in allowing the fewest sacks with 19. Donaldson was released for salary cap reasons in the 1997 off-season. During his time with the Cowboys, he experienced a career renaissance, making the Pro Bowl both seasons. He was also part of a formidable offensive line that included: Larry Allen, Nate Newton, Mark Tuinei and Erik Williams.

== Personal life ==
Donaldson currently resides in Indianapolis, Indiana where he is a high school football coach. His cousin Robert Lavette was an NFL player for the Dallas Cowboys. During his high school football days at East Rome, he was teammates with future Pro Wrestling legend Arn Anderson
