= Mike Kelley (quarterback) =

American football player (born 1959)

No. 12, 10
- Position: Quarterback

Personal information
- Born: December 31, 1959 (age 66); Sonora, California, U.S.
- Listed height: 6 ft 3 in (1.91 m)
- Listed weight: 195 lb (88 kg)

Career information
- High school: Westside (Augusta, Georgia)
- College: Georgia Tech
- NFL draft: 1982: 6th round, 149th overall pick

Career history
- Atlanta Falcons (1982)*; Tampa Bay Bandits (1983); Memphis Showboats (1984-1985); Saskatchewan Roughriders (1986); San Diego Chargers (1987)
- * Offseason or practice squad member only

Career NFL statistics
- Passing attempts: 29
- Passing completions: 17
- Completion percentage: 58.6%
- TD–INT: 1–0
- Passing yards: 305
- Passer rating: 106.2
- Stats at Pro Football Reference

Mike Kelley (born December 31, 1959) is an American former professional football player who was a quarterback in the National Football League (NFL), United States Football League (USFL) and Canadian Football League (CFL). He played for the Tampa Bay Bandits and Memphis Showboats in the USFL. After the USFL failed, he joined the San Diego Chargers of the NFL as a replacement player during the 1987 strike. Eight years after his stint with the Chargers, he came out of retirement at age 35 to serve as backup quarterback on the Memphis Mad Dogs, a CFL team. He played college football for the Georgia Tech fYellow Jackets. He was inducted into the Georgia Tech Hall of Fame in 1992.

== See also ==
- List of Georgia Tech Yellow Jackets starting quarterbacks
- Georgia Tech Yellow Jackets football statistical leaders
