= Jerry Mays (running back) =

American football player (born 1967)

No. 47
- Position: Running back

Personal information
- Born: December 8, 1967 (age 58); Augusta, Georgia, U.S.
- Listed height: 5 ft 7 in (1.70 m)
- Listed weight: 176 lb (80 kg)

Career information
- High school: Thomson (GA)
- College: Georgia Tech
- NFL draft: 1990: undrafted

Career history
- San Diego Chargers (1990)

Awards and highlights
- First-team All-ACC (1989); ACC Rookie of the Year (1985)
- Stats at Pro Football Reference

Jerry Mays (born December 8, 1967) is a former player in the NFL. He played for the San Diego Chargers. He played collegiately for the Georgia Tech football team.

== High school ==
Mays remains both the all time and single season rushing leader at Thomson High School in Thomson, Georgia. While at Thomson Mays had over 1,000 yards twice in his career. During the 1983 season he finished with 1,666 yards and the 1984 season with a whopping 2,369 yards.

== College ==
Mays played college football at Georgia Tech. After being offered a scholarship by only one Division I-A school he was the 1985 ACC Rookie of the Year under Coach Bill Curry. Through the 2006 season Mays was still 2nd all time on the Georgia Tech career rushing yards list with 3,699. He was inducted into the Georgia Tech Hall of Fame in 1997.

- 1985: 104 carries for 566 yards and 3 touchdowns. 9 catches for 95 yards and 1 touchdown. 5 kick returns for 134 yards.
- 1986: 148 carries for 842 yards and 7 touchdowns. 23 catches for 161 yards and 3 touchdowns.
- 1988: 194 carries for 942 yards and 9 touchdowns. 46 catches for 338 yards and 2 touchdowns.
- 1989: 249 carries for 1349 yards and 8 touchdowns. 37 catches for 275 yards and 4 touchdowns.

== Professional ==
Mays played in two games during the 1990 season for the Chargers of the NFL.

== Awards and honors ==
- Georgia Tech Athletics Hall of Fame (1997)
- ACC Rookie of the Year (1985)
- Georgia Tech 2nd All-Time Rushing yards leader (1985–1989)
- Thomson High School (GA) All-Time Rushing Yards Leader (1982–1984) - 4,741 yards
- Thomson High School (GA) Single-Season Rushing Yards Leader (1984) - 2,369

1989 All ACC “Atlantic Coast Conference” 1990 Japan Bowl “ramblinwreck.cstv.com” 2017 Thomson High School Wall of Fame 2024 Georgia High School Football Hall of Fame
