= Joshua Nesbitt =

American football player (born 1988)

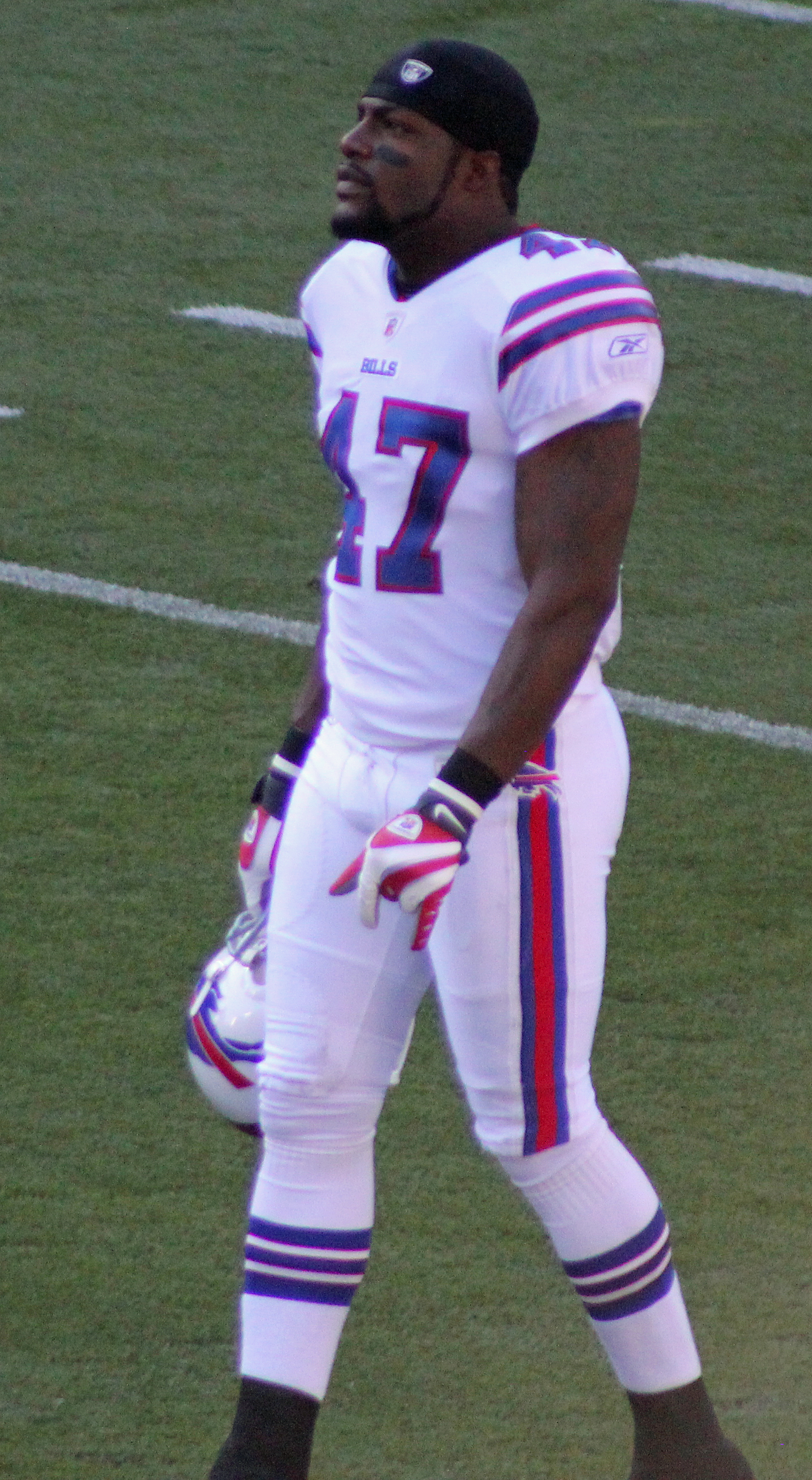
- Nesbitt with the Buffalo Bills in August 2011

No. 7, 47
- Position: Safety

Personal information
- Born: April 15, 1988 (age 38); Greensboro, Georgia, U.S.
- Listed height: 6 ft 1 in (1.85 m)
- Listed weight: 213 lb (97 kg)

Career information
- College: Georgia Tech
- NFL draft: 2011: undrafted

Career history
- Buffalo Bills (2011)

Awards and highlights
- First-team All-ACC (2009)
- Stats at Pro Football Reference

Joshua Leonard Nesbitt (born April 15, 1988) is an American former professional football player who was a safety for the Buffalo Bills of the National Football League (NFL). He was a starter at quarterback playing college football for the Georgia Tech Yellow Jackets.

== Early life ==
Nesbitt attended Greene County High School in Greensboro, Georgia from 2003 to 2007. He was regarded as Georgia's number one recruit at quarterback as a senior and the number 12 QB in the nation. Nesbitt was named to the Scout.com national Hot 100 (No. 76) and the Rivals 250, and was the No. 4 overall prospect in Georgia according to Scout.com. He was also rated the No. 9 dual-threat quarterback in the nation by Rivals. Nesbitt was a two-time, first-team all-state selection and the Class AA Offensive Player of the Year as a junior. He was named to the Atlanta Journal-Constitution Super Southern 100 and preseason Super 11 team before his senior year.

As a junior at Greene County High under Coach Larry Milligan, Nesbitt passed for 2,833 yards with 31 touchdowns, while rushing for 1,252 yards and 22 scores. As a senior, he passed for 2,256 yards and 32 touchdowns with just four interceptions, and 134-of-222 passes completed. Nesbitt also rushed for 493 yards on 93 carries and scored eight touchdowns. He added four interceptions in two seasons on defense.

== College career ==
=== Freshman season ===
As Taylor Bennett's backup, Nesbitt was brought in for rushing during his freshman season under coach Chan Gailey.

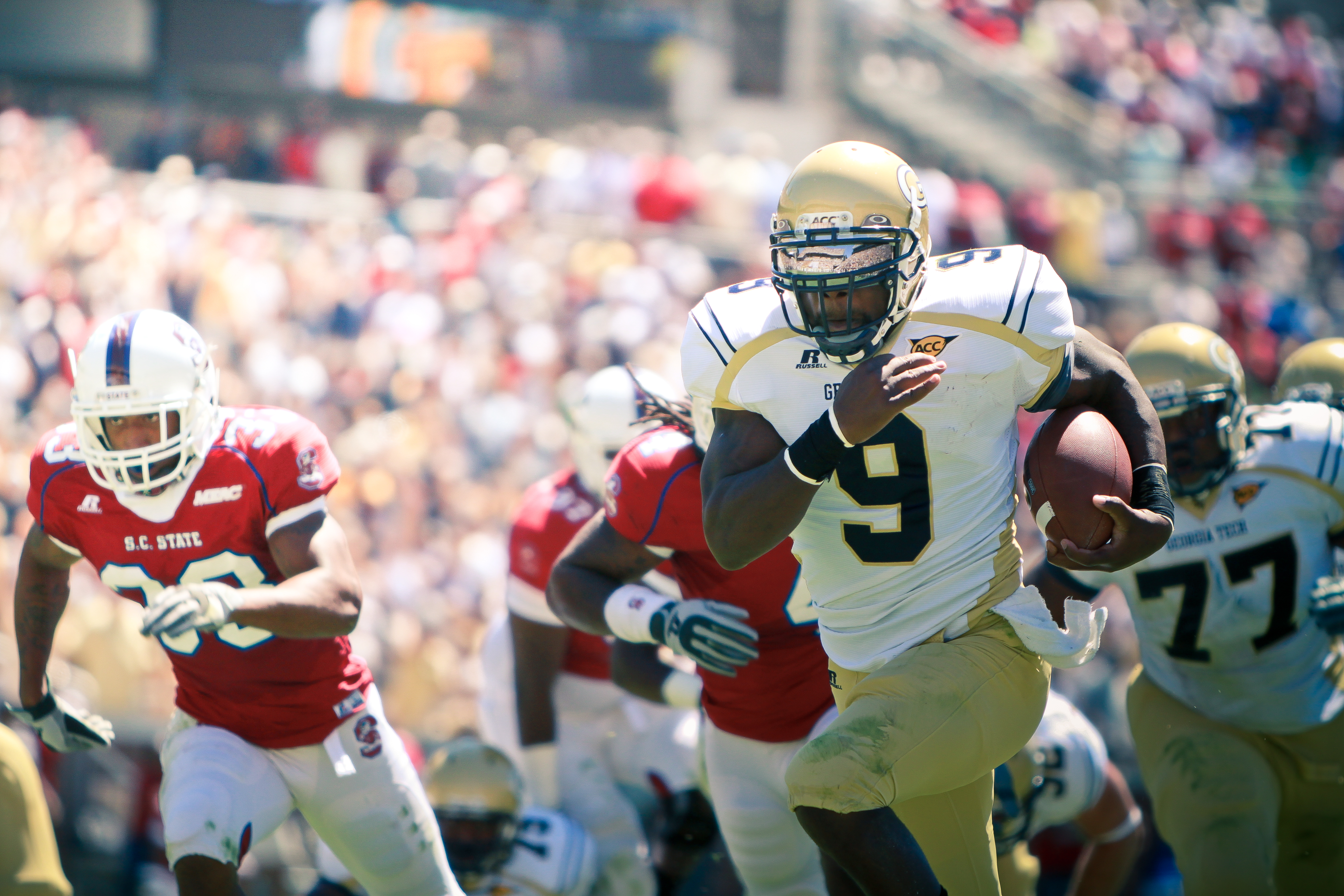
Nesbitt rushing in Georgia Tech's 2010 season opener

=== Sophomore season ===
In 2008, Nesbitt earned the starting quarterback job under new Tech coach Paul Johnson for his option offense.

=== Junior season ===
The 2009 season saw Nesbitt rush for 1037 yards and 18 touchdowns. Nesbitt also had 1701 yards through the air with 10 touchdowns. He led the Yellow Jackets to an ACC Championship Game and a BCS bowl game. The Jackets finished the season with an 11–3 record following the 2010 FedEx Orange Bowl loss to Iowa. Nesbitt was honored as the 2009 ACC first-team quarterback. He was joined on the all-conference team by Jonathan Dwyer, Demaryius Thomas, Cord Howard, Sean Bedford, Derrick Morgan, and Morgan Burnett, all of whom were on the 2009 Georgia Tech Yellow Jackets football team alongside Nesbitt.

=== Senior season ===
After returning for his senior year, Nesbitt suffered a broken right arm after attempting a tackle on November 4, 2010, vs. Virginia Tech. He missed the remainder of the season, but not before setting some impressive records at his position. With 2,806 career rushing yards, Nesbitt rushed for more yards than any quarterback in ACC history and over 1,000 yards more than any quarterback in Georgia Tech history. He also rushed for 35 career touchdowns— six more than any quarterback in the history of the ACC and 16 more than any Yellow Jacket quarterback before him.

== Professional career ==
Nesbitt went undrafted in the 2011 NFL draft but was signed by the Buffalo Bills as a defensive back. On September 3, 2011, he was cut from the Bills' final 53-man roster, but was signed to the practice squad the following day. Nesbitt was signed to the Bills 53-man roster as a safety on November 15, 2011. He was waived/injured by the Bills on August 22, 2012, and subsequently reverted to injured reserve on August 24.

== See also ==
- List of Georgia Tech Yellow Jackets starting quarterbacks
- Georgia Tech Yellow Jackets football statistical leaders
- 2008 Georgia Tech Yellow Jackets football team
- 2009 Georgia Tech Yellow Jackets football team
- 2010 Georgia Tech Yellow Jackets football team
