= Dave Huxtable =

American football coach

Atlanta Falcons
- Title: Senior defensive assistant

Personal information
- Born: December 20, 1956 (age 69); Elgin, Illinois, U.S.

Career information
- College: Eastern Illinois

Career history
- Iowa State (1982) Graduate assistant; Independence (1983–1984) Defensive coordinator; Western Kentucky (1985–1988) Linebackers coach; Western Kentucky (1989) Defensive coordinator; East Carolina (1990–1991) Special teams coordinator & linebackers coach; Georgia Tech (1992–1994) Special teams coordinator & linebackers coach; Georgia Tech (1995) Linebackers coach; Georgia Tech (1996–1997) Defensive coordinator & linebackers coach; East Carolina (1998) Linebackers coach; East Carolina (1999) Defensive line coach; Oklahoma State (2000) Special teams coordinator & linebackers coach; North Carolina (2001) Special teams coordinator & linebackers coach; North Carolina (2002–2003) Defensive coordinator & linebackers coach; UCF (2004–2007) Special teams coordinator & linebackers coach; UCF (2008–2010) Defensive coordinator; Wisconsin (2011) Linebackers coach; Pittsburgh (2012) Defensive coordinator; NC State (2013–2019) Defensive coordinator & linebackers coach; Texas (2020) Analyst; Alabama (2021–2022) Analyst; Atlanta Falcons (2023–present) Senior defensive assistant

Dave Huxtable (born December 20, 1956) is an American football coach who is the senior defensive assistant for the Atlanta Falcons of the National Football League (NFL). He served as the defensive coordinator at the North Carolina State University from 2013 to 2019. He previously served as the defensive coordinator of the Pittsburgh Panthers football team.

== Coaching career ==
Huxtable began his coaching career as a graduate assistant with the Iowa State Cyclones in 1982 before serving as the defensive coordinator at Independence Community College. After being a member of the Western Kentucky Hilltoppers staff from 1985 to 1989, he coached linebackers and special teams with the East Carolina Pirates from 1990 to 1991. During that time, he coached linebacker Robert Jones, who was later selected in the first round of the 1992 NFL draft by the Dallas Cowboys. From 1992 to 1997, Huxtable was a member of the Georgia Tech Yellow Jackets. He was the linebackers coach during his entire tenure, also serving as special teams coordinator from 1992 to 1994 and defensive coordinator from 1996 to 1997. While with the Yellow Jackets, he coach linebacker Keith Brooking, who was later selected in the first round of the 1998 NFL draft by the Atlanta Falcons. Following his time with Georgia Tech, Huxtable returned to East Carolina for two seasons, serving as linebackers coach in 1998 and defensive line coach in 1999. After a year away from coaching, he was a member of the North Carolina Tar Heels staff from 2001 to 2003. Again, he was linebackers coach during his entire tenure, also serving as special teams coordinator in 2001 and defensive coordinator from 2002 to 2003. He then joined the UCF Knights, serving as linebackers coach and special teams coordinator from 2004 to 2007 and defensive coordinator from 2008 to 2010.

=== Pittsburgh ===
In 2012, Huxtable left his position as linebackers coach at Wisconsin to become the defensive coordinator at the University of Pittsburgh.

=== NC State ===
In 2013, Huxtable joined the staff at North Carolina State University, serving as defensive coordinator under head coach Dave Doeren. On December 2, 2019, Huxtable was relieved of his duties after the Wolfpack's 4–7 season, in which Huxtable's defense ranked 74th nationally.

=== Atlanta Falcons ===
On March 4, 2023, Huxtable was hired away from the Alabama Crimson Tide football team to be a defensive assistant with the Atlanta Falcons of the National Football League (NFL).

== Personal ==
Huxtable is a graduate of Eastern Illinois University. He is married with two children and is a native of Elgin, Illinois.
