= Joe Burns (American football) =

American football player (born 1979)

No. 35
- Position: Running back

Personal information
- Born: September 15, 1979 (age 47); Thomasville, Georgia, U.S.
- Listed height: 5 ft 9 in (1.75 m)
- Listed weight: 215 lb (98 kg)

Career information
- High school: Thomas County Central (Thomasville, Georgia)
- College: Georgia Tech

Career history
- Buffalo Bills (2002–2006)

Awards and highlights
- First-team All-ACC (2001)
- Stats at Pro Football Reference

Joe Frank Burns (born September 15, 1979) is an American former professional football player who was a running back in the National Football League (NFL). He played college football for the Georgia Tech Yellow Jackets.

== High school ==
Joseph Frank Burns attended Thomas County Central High School in Georgia. Burns was a four-year letterwinner in football, and also won two varsity letters in track. In football, Burns rushed for 4547 yards and 56 touchdowns during his last two years of high school football, and as a senior, Burns was named the Georgia Player of the Year, and was a USA Today Honorable Mention All-USA selection. Burns also has a cousin in Avon, Indiana named Charles Davis Jr. who plays running back and is a rising star in the area class of 2012.

== College ==
Burns attended Georgia Tech and played for the Yellow Jackets. Burns was an All-Conference running back, and left as the fourth leading rusher in school history.

== Retirement ==
Burns retired in 2006 and co-founded RisingSeniors.com and the Georgia Junior Bowl. RisingSeniors.com has formed an alliance with the NFL Players Association to introduce a character and life skills development program designed to provide resources to assist students dealing with the challenges ahead. It is a free program created to prepare high school junior student-athletes for their senior year by equipping them with the necessary tools to thrive academically, athletically and socially. These skills are important for a successful transition to their senior year, college and beyond. The Georgia Junior Bowl will be the first all-star football game of its kind showcasing the top high school junior football players in the state of Georgia; the purpose of the game is to enhance student athletes recruiting exposure before their senior year. Joseph Frank Burns is also educating high school athletes and families across the country on the college recruiting process as an educational speaker with Upnextrecruiting.com.
