= Robert Lavette =

American football player (born 1963)

No. 29, 22
- Position: Running back

Personal information
- Born: September 8, 1963 (age 63); Cartersville, Georgia, U.S.
- Listed height: 5 ft 11 in (1.80 m)
- Listed weight: 190 lb (86 kg)

Career information
- High school: Cartersville
- College: Georgia Tech
- NFL draft: 1985: 4th round, 103rd overall pick

Career history
- Dallas Cowboys (1985–1987); Philadelphia Eagles (1987); Atlanta Falcons (1988)*; San Diego Chargers (1989)*
- * Offseason or practice squad member only

Awards and highlights
- 2× First-team All-ACC (1982, 1984)

Career NFL statistics
- Rushing yards: 40
- Rushing average: 1.7
- Receptions: 7
- Receiving yards: 45
- Touchdowns: 1
- Stats at Pro Football Reference

Robert Lee Lavette (born September 8, 1963) is an American former professional football player who was a running back in the National Football League (NFL) for the Dallas Cowboys and Philadelphia Eagles. He played college football for the Georgia Tech Yellow Jackets.

== Early life ==
Lavette attended Cartersville High School, where he played as a running back, rushing for 2,103 yards and 19 touchdowns as a senior, while receiving Georgia Class AA back of the year honors.

He gained 5,870 career rushing yards and 49 touchdowns. He set 9 career records, 7 season marks and three-single-game records.

== College career ==
Lavette accepted a football scholarship from Georgia Tech. As a freshman, he was the ACC third leading rusher (866 yards), third in receiving (45 receptions), first in all purpose yards and first in kickoff returns. His 307 receiving yards led the team. Against the University of Alabama, Lavette's fourth quarter touchdown (his second of the game) capped an 80-yard touchdown drive. The Yellow Jackets would go on to lose the remainder of their games and finish 1-10 on the year. It was also Georgia Tech's first football win over the Tide since 1962. He registered 188 carries for 866 yards, 7 rushing touchdowns and 45 catches for 307 yards.

As a sophomore, he led the ACC in rushing (1,208 yards), touchdowns (19) also a school and conference record, all-purpose yards (1,570 yards) and scoring average (10.4) points. His touchdown total was a school record and he was second in the nation in scoring. Against the number one ranked University of Georgia, he rushed for a career-high 203 yards on 38 carries, outgaining Heisman Trophy winner Herschel Walker by 40 yards. He posted 280 carries for 1208 yards, 19 rushing touchdowns and 25 catches for 286 yards.

As a junior, he missed all or parts of four games because of injuries, collecting 186 carries for 803 yards, 5 rushing touchdowns. 21 catches for 123 yards and one receiving touchdown.

As a senior, he finished ninth nationally in rushing with 1,189 yards and a 108.1 yards-per-game average, while also collecting 260 carries, 14 rushing touchdowns and 23 catches for 146 yards.

In 1990, he was inducted into the Georgia Tech Sports Hall of Fame. In 2013, he received the honor of being and ACC Legend.

=== Records/ Accomplishments ===
Lavette finished his career as the school's all-time leading rusher, receiver and scorer. He finished with 4,066 rushing yards, 114 receptions for 862 yards and scored 46 touchdowns for 276 points. He had 18 100-yard games and accounted for 5,393 total yards, with an average of 125.5 total yards per game. At the time he ranked number 17th on the NCAA's all-time rushing list and set 19 school records.

To this day is considered by many to be one of the top running backs in Georgia Tech's history. He still maintains many career yardage records and is a member of the Georgia Tech Athletics Hall of Fame and was named an ACC Legend.

- Georgia Tech career rushing yards- 4,066 (1981–1984)
- Georgia Tech career all-purpose- 5,393
- Georgia Tech (non-kicker) scoring leader- 46 touchdowns, 276 total points
- Georgia Tech Athletics Hall of Fame (1990)
- Most career rushing touchdowns (45)
- Most career touchdowns (46)
- Most total points (276).
- Most 100-yard rushing games (18)
- Single-season rushing touchdowns (19)
- Most career carries (914)
- Most carries in a game (39)
- Most career receptions (114)

== Professional career ==
=== Dallas Cowboys ===
Lavette was selected by the Dallas Cowboys in the fourth round (103rd overall) of the 1985 NFL draft. He was also selected by the Jacksonville Bulls in the 1985 USFL Territorial Draft. As a rookie, he backed up Tony Dorsett and was the team's top kickoff return player, making 34 returns for 682 yards. On December 4, he was placed on the injured reserve list after spraining his knee while covering a Kickoff against the Philadelphia Eagles on November 24.

In 1986, with the addition of Herschel Walker to the Cowboys team, it was difficult for him find playing time at running back. He began to return punts as well as kickoffs during the regular season.

In 1987, after the players went on a strike on the third week of the season, those contests were canceled (reducing the 16-game season to 15) and the NFL decided that the games would be played with replacement players. He crossed the picket line on October 7 and appeared in 2 games as the third-string running back. He had one reception for 6 yards against the Philadelphia Eagles and 2 kickoff returns for 32 yards against the Washington Redskins. He played a total of 4 games in the season, before being waived on November 3.

Lavette had some great training camp performances, but he never developed as a consistent running back,

=== Philadelphia Eagles ===
On November 4, 1987, he was claimed off waivers by the Philadelphia Eagles. After being declared inactive in two games, he played in just one game against the St. Louis Cardinals, returning 2 kickoffs for 37 yards. He was released on December 11.

=== Atlanta Falcons ===
On March 22, 1988, he signed as a free agent with the Atlanta Falcons. He was cut on August 29.

== Personal life ==
His cousin Ray Donaldson was an All-Pro NFL center.
