= Jonathan Smith (wide receiver) =

American football player (born 1981)

No. 19, 81
- Position: Wide receiver

Personal information
- Born: November 28, 1981 (age 44); Argyle, Georgia, U.S.
- Listed height: 5 ft 10 in (1.78 m)
- Listed weight: 194 lb (88 kg)

Career information
- High school: Clinch Co. (GA)
- College: Georgia Tech
- NFL draft: 2004: 7th round, 214th overall pick

Career history
- Buffalo Bills (2004–2005); New England Patriots (2006); Buffalo Bills (2007)*
- * Offseason or practice squad member only

Awards and highlights
- Second-team All-ACC (2003)

Career NFL statistics
- Receptions: 8
- Receiving yards: 77
- Receiving touchdowns: 1
- Stats at Pro Football Reference

Jonathan Dewayne "Fast Freddie" Smith (born November 28, 1981) is an American former professional football player who was a wide receiver in the National Football League (NFL). He played college football for the Georgia Tech Yellow Jackets and was selected by the Buffalo Bills in the seventh round with the 214th overall pick in the 2004 NFL draft.

== College career ==
Smith was a successful college wide receiver and kick returner at Georgia Tech from 2001 to 2003. While at Georgia Tech, he majored in Management. In four years, Smith had over 2,931 all-purpose yards and 15 all-purpose touchdowns. He earned the nickname Fast Freddie because his short-strided running style resembled Fred Flintstone when driving the Flintmobile.

== Professional career ==
Smith was selected 214th overall in the seventh round of the 2004 NFL draft by the Buffalo Bills as the 214th overall pick. He was the backup kick and punt returner for the Buffalo Bills in 2005 and had over 400 all-purpose yards in his rookie season.

The Bills released Smith at the end of the 2006 preseason. He was immediately claimed off waivers by the New England Patriots, who then released him before the opening game. On September 12, 2006, the Patriots re-signed Smith. On October 5, 2006, the Patriots released Smith from their roster. On January 4, 2007, Smith was signed to the Patriots' 2007 roster. He was released again on July 19, 2007, and claimed by the Bills off waivers on July 23.
