= Vad Lee =

American football player (born 1993)

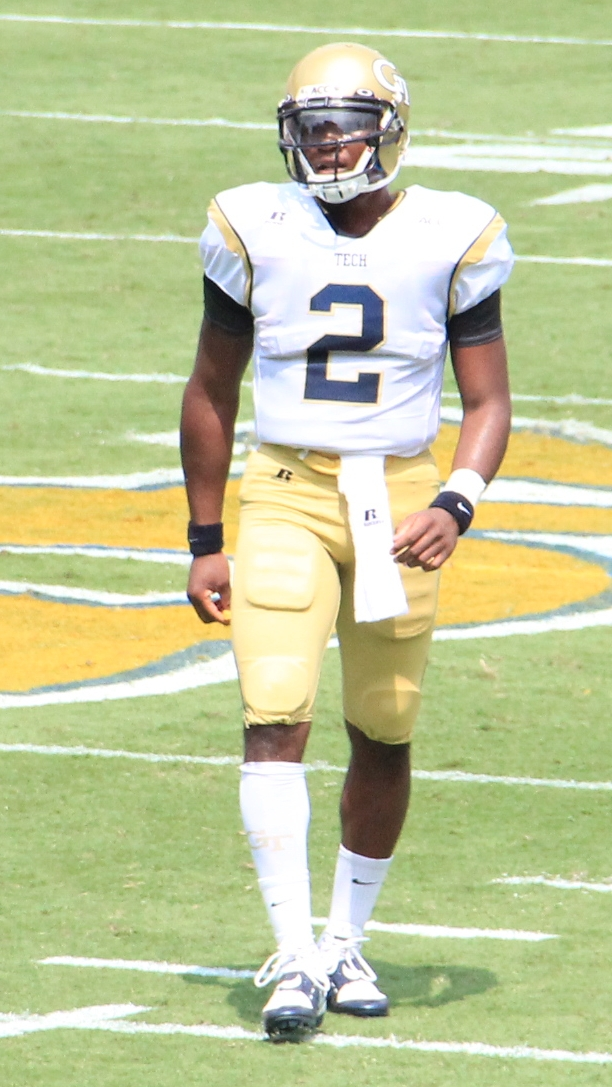
- Lee in 2013

No. 2
- Position: Quarterback

Personal information
- Born: April 27, 1993 (age 33); Durham, North Carolina, U.S.
- Listed height: 6 ft 2 in (1.88 m)
- Listed weight: 213 lb (97 kg)

Career information
- High school: Hillside (Durham, North Carolina)
- College: Georgia Tech (2011–2013); James Madison (2014–2015)
- NFL draft: 2016: undrafted

Career history
- Saskatchewan Roughriders (2016); Columbus Lions (2018)*; YCF Grit (2019); DC Defenders (2020)*; TSL Alphas (2021); TSL Aviators (2021); Pittsburgh Maulers (2022); BC Lions (2023)*; Philadelphia Stars (2023)
- * Offseason or practice squad member only

Awards and highlights
- 2× Dudley Award (2014 & 2015); Third-team FCS All-American (2014)

Lavaedeay Monlique "Vad" Lee (born April 27, 1993) is an American former professional football quarterback. He was a member of the Saskatchewan Roughriders and BC Lions of the Canadian Football League (CFL), Columbus Lions of American Indoor Football (AIF), DC Defenders of the XFL, and Pittsburgh Maulers and Philadelphia Stars of the United States Football League (USFL).

He went to Hillside High School in Durham, North Carolina. Lee is considered to be a skilled dual-threat, athletic quarterback who redshirted as a true freshman at Georgia Tech. Lee played in several games during his redshirt freshman season in 2012 as a backup to starting Georgia Tech quarterback Tevin Washington, and Lee was the Yellow Jackets' starting quarterback during 2013 season. Lee went to Georgia Tech after a successful prep career in North Carolina. In January 2014, Lee transferred to James Madison University.

== Early life ==
Lee earned four varsity letters and served three years as a team captain while playing for Hillside under coach Antonio King. Lee led Hillside to the North Carolina state championship in 2010. Lee's high school career totals include: 5,000 passing yards, 1,960 rushing yards, and Lee was responsible for 85 touchdowns. Lee also played wide receiver as a sophomore, producing 1,124 receiving yards and nine touchdowns.

Lee led Hillside to a perfect 16–0 record in 2010 and won the North Carolina 4A State Championship game 40–0 over Davie County at BB&T field in Winston-Salem, North Carolina. Lee threw for 264 yards and three touchdown passes in the state championship game, earning MVP honors. Lee's other high school honors include: the Pac-6 Conference Player of the Year, the AP North Carolina state Player of the Year, first team all-state, and MVP of the Offense-Defense All-American Bowl.

== College career ==
=== Georgia Tech ===
Lee was recruited by Georgia Tech as a four-star recruit. He received a redshirt season in 2011. Lee played in several games during 2012 football season as a backup to starting Georgia Tech quarterback Tevin Washington. However, Lee saw only limited playing time until Georgia Tech faced North Carolina on November 10, 2012. Lee entered the game at Kenan Memorial Stadium with Tech trailing North Carolina 14–7 in the first quarter, and he never left. Lee made Georgia Tech's triple option offense unstoppable, helping the Yellow Jackets account for 588 yards of offense in a 68–50 win over North Carolina, the most combined points ever in any Atlantic Coast Conference football game. Lee rushed for 112 yards and two touchdowns, and he threw for 169 yards and a touchdown as well. However, coach Paul Johnson continued to start Washington in every football game during 2012 season, and he rotated the two quarterbacks with their playing time depending on performance during games. Lee became the Yellow Jackets' starting quarterback at the beginning of the 2013 football season. Lee announced his decision to transfer to another school at the end of the 2013 football season.

=== James Madison ===
In January 2014, Chip Patterson at CBSsports.com reported Lee would transfer to FCS James Madison for the upcoming spring semester. Lee transferred to JMU due to his familiarity with the Dukes' new head coach, Everett Withers, who had recruited him from his time at North Carolina.

==== 2014 season ====
In his first season with the Dukes, Lee was named the starter at quarterback and would go on to lead the Dukes to a 9–3 regular season along with a trip to the 2014 FCS playoffs. Along the way, Lee would go on to set JMU's single-game passing, completion percentage, single-season touchdown, passing & total-offense records in addition to being named CAA Offensive Player of the Week three times. Following a 55–20 JMU victory over rival Richmond on November 15, 2014, Lee was named to the 2014 Walter Payton Award watch list and would ultimately place 4th for that award. On December 10, 2014, Vad Lee was named the recipient of the 2014 Dudley Award, which is given to the top Division I football player in Virginia over Old Dominion's Taylor Heinicke & Virginia Tech's Kendall Fuller. The following week, Lee was named 2014 Associated Press Third Team FCS All-American.

==== 2015 season ====
Prior to the start of the 2015 season, Lee was named to the watch lists for the STATS FCS Offensive Player of the Year (formerly the Walter Payton Award) and the College Football Performance Awards FCS National Performer of the Year Trophy. In JMU's 2015 home opening victory against Morehead State, Lee became the first JMU QB to throw for more than 250 yards and rush for more than 100 in a single game. In a week four 48–45 victory against SMU, Lee set a Division I record by becoming the first player to both run and pass for 275 yards in a single game.

After a 7–0 start to the season, Lee suffered a broken foot during the fourth quarter of a 59–49 loss against Richmond. During the game, Lee tied JMU's all-time passing touchdown record with 51 career touchdowns, across just 21 games. Lee was forced to undergo surgery for his foot, ending his final college season. While announcing the end of Lee's career, head coach Everett Withers called him "one of the best players in JMU history."

External image
- GT vs. UNC 11/10/12

=== Statistics ===
	Passing						Rushing		
Year (College)	Comp	Attempts	Comp%	Yards	TDowns	Intercep.	Attempts	Yards	TDown
2011 (GT)	DNP								
2012 (GT)	27	56	48.2%	596	4	3	96	544	9
2013 (GT)	82	180	45.6%	1,561	11	10	182	513	8
2014 (JMU)	282	465	60.6%	3,462	30	7	183	826	9
2015 (JMU)	164	240	68.3%	2,190	21	10	109	814	8
Total	555	941	59.0%	7,809	66	30	570	2,697	34

== Professional career ==
=== Saskatchewan Roughriders ===
Lee dressed for three games for the Saskatchewan Roughriders in 2016 as the third-string quarterback, recording one rushing attempt. Lee was cut on August 12, 2016.

=== Columbus Lions ===
On August 28, 2017, Lee signed with the Columbus Lions for the 2018 season. He was released on February 1, 2018.

In February 2019, Lee joined Your Call Football where he was coached by Solomon Wilcots during a 4-game series where fans called the plays through a mobile app.

=== DC Defenders ===
Lee was signed by the DC Defenders of the XFL in December 2019. He was waived during final roster cuts on January 22, 2020.

Lee signed with the Alphas of The Spring League in May 2021.

=== Pittsburgh Maulers ===
He signed with the Pittsburgh Maulers of the United States Football League on May 10, 2022. Lee led the team to its first win of the season just 5 days later.

Lee was released after the season on January 2, 2023.

=== BC Lions ===
Lee signed with the BC Lions of the CFL on January 5, 2023. He was released on February 27, 2023.

=== Philadelphia Stars ===
On March 19, 2023, Lee signed with the Philadelphia Stars of the United States Football League (USFL). The Stars folded when the XFL and USFL merged to create the United Football League (UFL).

== Career statistics ==
Year	Team	League	Games			Passing								Rushing			
Year	Team	League	GP	GS	Record	Cmp	Att	Pct	Yds	Y/A	TD	Int	Rtg	Att	Yds	Avg	TD
2016	SSK	CFL	3	0	0–0	0	0	0.0	0	0.0	0	0	0.0	1	0	0.0	0
2022	PIT	USFL	6	4	1–3	71	128	55.5	729	5.7	6	6	68.1	17	60	3.5	1

== See also ==
- List of Georgia Tech Yellow Jackets starting quarterbacks
- Georgia Tech Yellow Jackets football statistical leaders
- 2012 Sun Bowl
