= Reggie Ball =

American football player (born 1984)

No. 12
- Position: Quarterback

Personal information
- Born: October 6, 1984 (age 42); Stone Mountain, Georgia, U.S.
- Listed height: 5 ft 11 in (1.80 m)
- Listed weight: 195 lb (88 kg)

Career information
- High school: Stephenson (Stone Mountain)
- College: Georgia Tech (2003–2006)
- NFL draft: 2007: undrafted

Career history
- Detroit Lions (2007–2008); Bricktown Brawlers (2011)

Awards and highlights
- ACC Rookie of the Year (2003); Champs Sports Bowl MVP (2004)

Reginald Lewis Ball (born October 6, 1984) is an American former football player. He played college football for the Georgia Tech Yellow Jackets and was signed by the Detroit Lions of the National Football League (NFL) as an undrafted free agent in 2007.

== Early life ==
Ball played his high school football at Stephenson High School in Stone Mountain, Georgia. As a senior, he passed for over 2,000 yards with 19 touchdowns and just two interceptions. He was named to the Super Southern 100 and Top 50 in Georgia by the Atlanta Journal-Constitution. Also, he was rated the number 133 player in Georgia by BorderWars.com and ranked among the nation's top 15 all-purpose quarterbacks by Rivals.com.

== College career ==
Ball was the first true freshman to start at quarterback for Georgia Tech since Stu Rogers in 1980. Ball's first start was in the Yellow Jackets' opening game against BYU in 2003. Since then, he missed just one game and amassed 8,128 passing yards, 57 touchdown passes and 9,579 total yards of offense in his career, but also threw 55 interceptions. Ball's passing yards total is third on Georgia Tech's career list, behind Joe Hamilton and Shawn Jones, and his touchdown pass and total offense totals are second behind Hamilton. Ball accumulated 11 rushing touchdowns and also rushed for 1,451 yards in his career, good for 18th on the Yellow Jacket leaderboard and second among Tech quarterbacks in history (Hamilton). He wore jersey number 1.

During his career, Ball was named ACC Rookie of the Year in 2003 and was named the MVP of the Champs Sports Bowl in 2004. He compiled a record of 29–20 as the starting quarterback for the Yellow Jackets. Ball, whose athleticism was well noted as CouchScout.com listed him at 4.46 in the 40-yard dash, led Georgia Tech to three 7-win seasons in a row. He capped off his career with a 9–5 mark in 2006 that included a #25 ranking nationally (heading into the Toyota Gator Bowl) and an ACC Coastal Division Championship. In 2005, Georgia Tech was trailing UGA 14–7 with 1st & 10 at the UGA 11. Ball threw an interception that helped secure a victory for the Bulldogs, who thus stretched their winning streak over their in-state rivals to five games.

Ball started his senior season for the Yellow Jackets by leading the team to a sterling 9–2 record, but his collegiate career ended on a negative note on December 2, 2006, with a 9–6 loss in the ACC Championship Game to Wake Forest, just one week after Ball's Georgia Tech team lost to in-state rival UGA for a sixth straight year. He completed less than 30% (15–51) of his passes in these last two games, threw four interceptions, and gave up a crucial fumble in the loss to Georgia. Although Georgia Tech earned a spot to play West Virginia in the Gator Bowl that year, Ball's controversial career abruptly ended when he was named academically ineligible, and backup quarterback Taylor Bennett was named the starter. He left Georgia Tech after this season having completed only 44% of his passes, the worst mark of his four-year career, and not receiving an academic degree.

=== Legacy ===
Ball's college career will forever be marred with inconsistency. The teams he led "played to the level of the opponent," producing several impressive upsets while losing "easier" games. Although he won several big games for the Jackets including two wins against ranked Auburn University teams and a win against #3 University of Miami on the road in 2005, Ball-led Yellow Jacket teams were 0–4 against the University of Georgia, Georgia Tech's primary rival. Ball's play in these games (including, in 2004, a drive-ending intentional incomplete pass out of bounds on 4th down and earning him the nickname "5th Down Reggie") will always be in question to Georgia Tech fans. He finished his career by losing to UGA, losing the ACC Championship game to Wake Forest, and being declared academically ineligible for the 2007 Gator Bowl, which would have been his final game. College football writer Pete Fiutak, contributor to the website Collegefootballnews.com, challenged readers to name a more ineffective four-year college football starter than Ball. Brett Jensen compared his career to that of the Clemson Tigers' Charlie Whitehurst; both had impressive freshman seasons, but they were unable to live up to the expectations placed upon them.

=== Statistics ===
	Passing						Rushing			
Year	CMP	ATT	CMP%	YDS	TD	INT	ATT	YDS	AVG	TD
2003	181	350	51.7	1,996	10	11	139	384	2.8	3
2004	164	330	49.7	2,147	16	18	130	332	2.6	2
2005	182	379	48.0	2,165	11	12	104	381	3.7	4
2006	135	304	44.4	1,820	20	14	122	354	2.9	2
Totals	662	1,363	48.6	8,128	57	55	495	1,451	2.9	11

== Professional career ==
=== Detroit Lions ===
At the NFL Combine, Ball tried out as a wide receiver, attempting to follow former college quarterbacks Antwaan Randle El and Reggie McNeal. He ran a 4.8 second 40-yard dash, and had somewhat inconsistent pass coverage. Ball was not selected during the 2007 NFL draft, but was signed by the Detroit Lions, auditioning for a role as a wide receiver/kick returner. He did not make the team.

On December 5, he was re-signed to the practice squad when defensive back LaMarcus Hicks was placed on injured reserve and wide receiver Brandon Middleton was promoted to the active roster. On July 27, 2008, he was placed on injured reserve.

Ball was released by the Lions on March 18, 2009.

=== Indoor Football League ===
Ball signed to play for the now-defunct Bricktown Brawlers of the Indoor Football League in 2011.

== See also ==
- List of Georgia Tech Yellow Jackets starting quarterbacks
- Georgia Tech Yellow Jackets football statistical leaders
