= Joe Harris (American football) =

American football player (born 1952)

No. 51, 50, 52
- Position: Linebacker

Personal information
- Born: December 6, 1952 (age 73); Fayetteville, North Carolina, U.S.
- Listed height: 6 ft 1 in (1.85 m)
- Listed weight: 225 lb (102 kg)

Career information
- High school: E. E. Smith (Fayetteville)
- College: Georgia Tech
- NFL draft: 1975: 8th round, 197th overall pick

Career history
- Hamilton Tiger-Cats (1975–1976); Washington Redskins (1977); San Francisco 49ers (1978); Minnesota Vikings (1979); Los Angeles Rams (1979–1981); Baltimore Colts (1982); Washington Federals (1983)

Career NFL statistics
- Sacks: 12
- Fumble recoveries: 7
- Defensive TDs: 1
- Stats at Pro Football Reference

Joseph Alexander Harris (born December 6, 1952) is an American former professional football player who was a linebacker in the National Football League (NFL) for five different teams. He was born in Fayetteville, North Carolina, and played college football for the Georgia Tech Yellow Jackets. He was inducted into the Georgia Tech Athletic Hall of Fame in 2000.
