= Tobias Oliver =

American football player (born 1999)

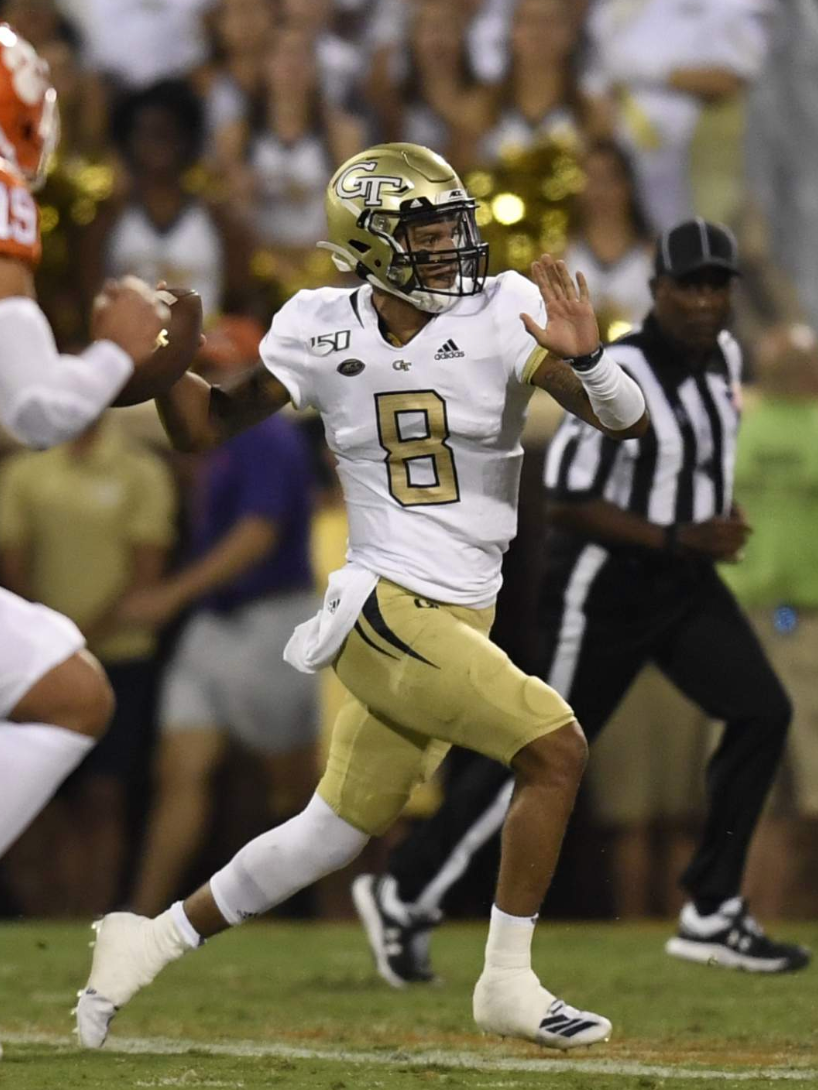
- Oliver in 2019

Profile
- Position: Cornerback

Personal information
- Born: June 22, 1999 (age 27); Warner Robins, Georgia, U.S.
- Listed height: 6 ft 2 in (1.88 m)
- Listed weight: 190 lb (86 kg)

Career information
- High school: Northside (Warner Robins, Georgia)
- College: Georgia Tech (2017–2021)

Tobias Oliver (born June 22, 1999) is an American former football cornerback. He played college football at Georgia Tech.

== Early life ==
Oliver attended Northside High School. He was a three-year starter and team captain. He played football and basketball. Oliver was rated as a three-star prospect by 247Sports.com, Rivals.com and Scout.com. He helped lead his team to a state championship as a sophomore in 2014 and an appearance in the state semifinals as a senior in 2016. Oliver amassed 3,785 passing yards and 3,218 rushing yards during his time at Northside. While at Northside, he was rivals with Jake Fromm, who played at Houston County High School.

== College career ==
He began his college career as a quarterback.

During his redshirt freshman season in 2018, Oliver appeared in 12 games. On October 25 at Virginia Tech, Oliver started his first game in a 49–28 victory for Georgia Tech. Oliver's next start was on August 29 against No. 1 Clemson.

In 2019, he switched to wide receiver, and in 2020, switched again to cornerback.

In December 2021, he announced he would enter the 2022 NFL draft.

== Professional career ==
In May 2022, he was invited to minicamp with the New York Giants.

== See also ==
- List of Georgia Tech Yellow Jackets starting quarterbacks
- Georgia Tech Yellow Jackets football statistical leaders
