= George Godsey =

American football player and coach (born 1979)

Current position
- Title: Offensive coordinator
- Team: Georgia Tech
- Conference: ACC

Biographical details
- Born: January 1, 1979 (age 47); Winston-Salem, North Carolina, U.S.

Playing career
- 1998–2001: Georgia Tech
- Position: Quarterback

Coaching career (HC unless noted)
- 2004: UCF (GA)
- 2005–2008: UCF (QB)
- 2009–2010: UCF (RB)
- 2011: New England Patriots (OA)
- 2012–2013: New England Patriots (TE)
- 2014: Houston Texans (QB)
- 2015–2016: Houston Texans (OC)
- 2017: Detroit Lions (DA)
- 2018: Detroit Lions (QB)
- 2019–2020: Miami Dolphins (TE)
- 2022–2025: Baltimore Ravens (TE)
- 2026–present: Georgia Tech (OC)

Accomplishments and honors

Awards
- First-team All-American (2000); Second-team All-ACC (2000)

George Robert Godsey (born January 1, 1979) is an American football coach and former player who is the current offensive coordinator at Georgia Tech. He was formerly the tight ends coach for the Baltimore Ravens of the National Football League (NFL). He previously served as an assistant coach for the Miami Dolphins, Detroit Lions, Houston Texans and New England Patriots, and as the co-offensive coordinator and sole offensive coordinator for the Dolphins and Texans, respectively.

Godsey played college football as a quarterback for the Georgia Tech Yellow Jackets, earning first-team All-American honors in 2000 and setting several school records. He played professionally for one season in the Arena Football League (AFL) before becoming a coach. He first coached at Central Florida and then the NFL's New England Patriots before joining the Texans, Lions, and Dolphins, all of whom were coached by former Belichick assistants: Bill O'Brien, Matt Patricia, and Brian Flores respectively.

== Early life ==
Godsey was born in Winston-Salem, North Carolina, on January 1, 1979. Both of his brothers played college football. His older brother Greg played at Air Force, and his younger brother Gary played at Notre Dame. Godsey grew up in Tampa, Florida, and attended Jesuit High School.

== Playing career ==
=== College ===
Godsey played under George O'Leary at Georgia Tech. He served as a back-up his freshman and sophomore years, before winning the starting job entering his junior year. In his first year as a starter in 2000, Godsey threw for 2,906 yards and 23 touchdowns; he also had the sixth best passing efficiency in the country. The team went 9–2 that year and made it to the Peach Bowl, where Godsey tore his ACL.

As a senior in 2001, Godsey completed 241 passes for 3,085 yards, both of which are school records. His final college game was a victory in the Seattle Bowl against 11th-ranked Stanford. Godsey was named the game's MVP after passing for 226 yards and a touchdown.

Godsey finished his college career as the most accurate passer in Georgia Tech history, with a career completion percentage of 63.3 He also has the third most passing touchdowns in school history with 41.

=== Arena League ===
Godsey spent the 2003 Arena Football League season on the Tampa Bay Storm. The team wound up winning ArenaBowl XVII.

== Coaching career ==
=== High school ===
In 2003, Godsey coached quarterbacks at The Lovett School in Atlanta under legendary coach Bill Railey. While the team is traditionally considered to be a private school power-house in Georgia High School Football, the Lions struggled in 2003, though they did make the playoffs.

=== College ===
Central Florida hired Godsey as a graduate assistant in 2004. He was reunited with O'Leary who took over the Knights that year. In 2005, Godsey was promoted to quarterbacks coach and served in that role through the 2008 season. In 2009 and 2010, he coached running backs. In the seven years Godsey spent at UCF, the Knights won two Conference USA championships.

=== New England Patriots ===
On February 17, 2011, Godsey was hired by the New England Patriots as an offensive assistant, after the team's prior offensive assistant Brian Ferentz was named tight ends coach. The move reunited him with Bill O'Brien, New England's offensive coordinator who held the same position with Georgia Tech in 2001 while Godsey was the starting quarterback.

Godsey was named tight ends coach for the Patriots in 2012.

=== Houston Texans ===
In February 2014, Godsey joined new Houston Texans coach Bill O'Brien as quarterbacks coach. The following year, he was promoted to the team's offensive coordinator. Godsey was let go by the Texans after the 2016 season.

=== Detroit Lions ===
On February 21, 2017, the Detroit Lions hired Godsey as a defensive assistant/special projects.

On February 7, 2018, Godsey was named quarterbacks coach of the Lions. Two days earlier, the Lions hired Godsey's former colleague from New England, Matt Patricia, as their new head coach. Patricia and Godsey served as assistant coaches for the Patriots from 2011 to 2013.

=== Miami Dolphins ===
On February 8, 2019, the Miami Dolphins hired Godsey as their tight ends coach, reuniting Godsey with new Dolphins head coach Brian Flores, whom served as the Patriots' defensive assistant and Safeties' coach between the 2011 and 2013 seasons, while Godsey served as New England's offensive assistant and tight ends' coach during those seasons.

Godsey received an additional title of co-offensive coordinator on March 11, 2021.

=== Baltimore Ravens ===
On February 10, 2022, it was announced that Godsey was hired as the new tight ends coach for the Baltimore Ravens.

=== Georgia Tech ===
On January 3, 2026, Godsey was hired to serve as the offensive coordinator for Georgia Tech.

== See also ==
- List of Georgia Tech Yellow Jackets starting quarterbacks
- Georgia Tech Yellow Jackets football statistical leaders
