= Joe Hamilton (American football) =

American football player (born 1977)

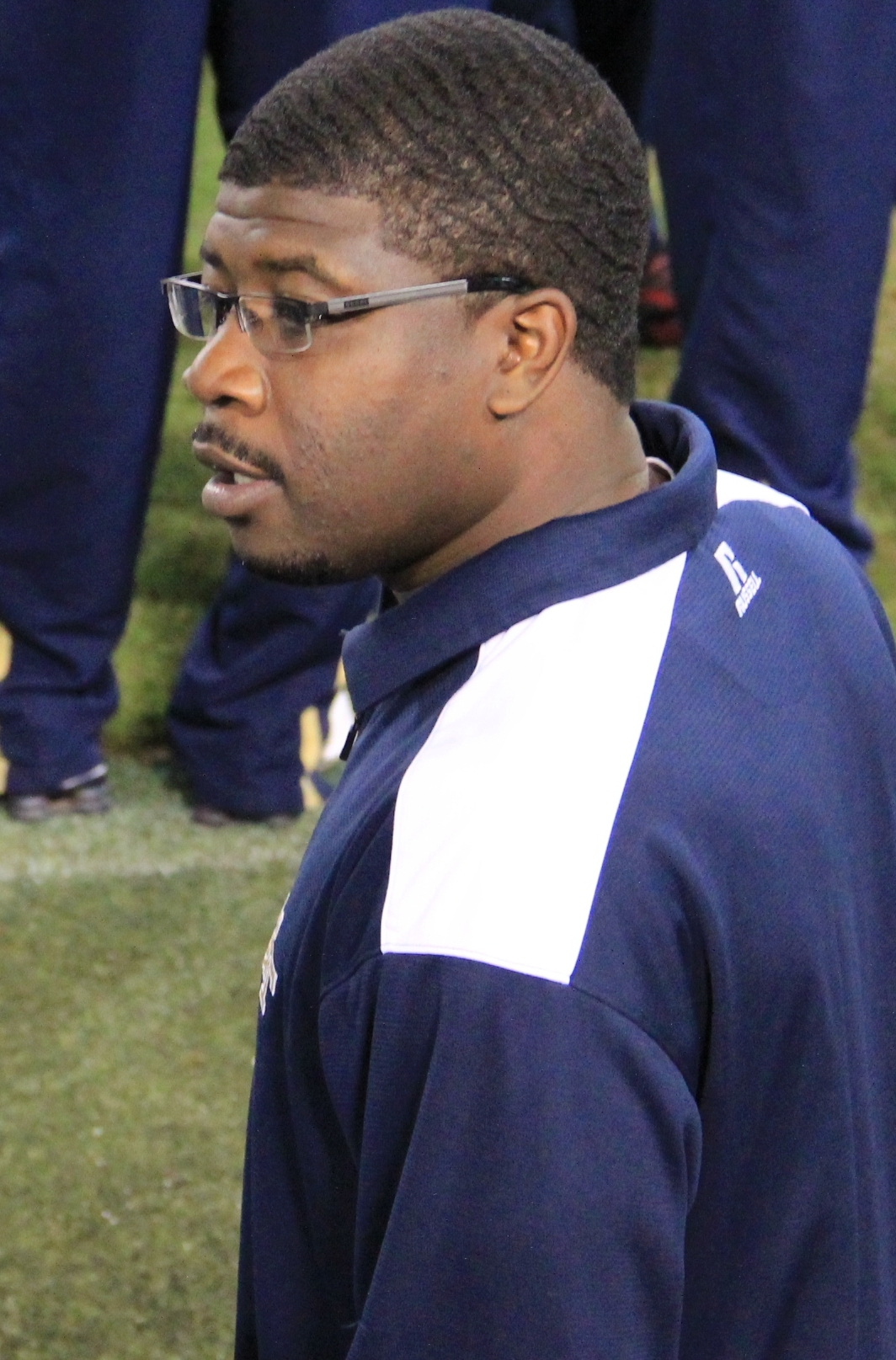
- Hamilton in 2013

No. 14
- Position: Quarterback

Personal information
- Born: March 13, 1977 (age 49); Alvin, South Carolina, U.S.
- Listed height: 5 ft 10 in (1.78 m)
- Listed weight: 190 lb (86 kg)

Career information
- High school: Macedonia (SC)
- College: Georgia Tech (1996–1999)
- NFL draft: 2000: 7th round, 234th overall pick

Career history
- Tampa Bay Buccaneers (2000–2002); Frankfurt Galaxy (2002); Indianapolis Colts (2004); Orlando Predators (2004–2006)

Awards and highlights
- Super Bowl champion (XXXVII); Davey O'Brien Award (1999); Consensus All-American (1999); NCAA Quarterback of the Year (1999); ACC Player of the Year (1999); ACC Offensive Player of the Year (1999); 2× First-team All-ACC (1998, 1999); 2× Gator Bowl MVP (1999, 2000); Carquest Bowl MVP (1997); Second Team All-Arena (2006)

Career AFL statistics
- Pass Comp-Pass Att: 806-1,215
- Passing yards: 9,863
- Percentage: 66.3
- TD–INT: 181-34
- Passer rating: 116.77
- Stats at ArenaFan.com
- Stats at Pro Football Reference
- College Football Hall of Fame

Joseph Fitzgerald Hamilton (born March 13, 1977) is an American former professional football player who was a quarterback in the National Football League (NFL), NFL Europe and Arena Football League (AFL). He played college football for the Georgia Tech Yellow Jackets, earning consensus All-American honors and winning the Davey O'Brien Award in 1999. After his playing career ended, Hamilton became an administrator and coach. He has served as the running backs coach for Georgia State University and currently works in the recruiting department for his alma mater, Georgia Tech.

== College career ==
Hamilton accepted an athletic scholarship to attend Georgia Tech, where he played for the Georgia Tech Yellow Jackets football team from 1996 to 1999. He set Atlantic Coast Conference (ACC) career records for total offense (10,640 yards), touchdown passes (65) and total touchdowns (83). As a senior in 1999, he was recognized as a consensus first-team All-American, won the Davey O'Brien Award, and was a finalist for the Heisman Trophy, finishing as the runner-up in the Heisman voting behind Wisconsin running back Ron Dayne. In 2002, he was named as one of the fifty members of the ACC 50th Anniversary Football Team. Hamilton was elected to the College Football Hall of Fame in 2014.

== Professional career ==
Due to his lack of prototypical height for an NFL quarterback (standing just 5'10"/1.78 m), he fell to the 7th round of the 2000 NFL draft before being drafted by the Tampa Bay Buccaneers. In three years with the Buccaneers he only played four downs in a single regular-season game. In 2002, the Buccaneers allocated Hamilton to NFL Europe, where he led the Frankfurt Galaxy to 5–2 record in 2002 before suffering a torn ACL. He spent the entire 2002 NFL season on injured reserve and was released by the Buccaneers at the end of the season. He received a Super Bowl ring following the Buccaneers' victory in Super Bowl XXXVII.

He signed with the Arena Football League's Orlando Predators in 2004 and guided the team to a 9–5 record and the playoffs, despite suffering another knee injury and missing two and a half games.

He was then signed by the Indianapolis Colts in 2004, reuniting with former Buccaneers coach Tony Dungy, but only saw limited action in one game before being released during the season.

He returned to the Orlando Predators where he was the starting quarterback through the 2006 season. He had a 32–15 record as the Predators' starter and led them to ArenaBowl XX in 2006, losing 69–61 to the Chicago Rush. With a win, Hamilton would have become the first player in history to own both a Super Bowl and ArenaBowl ring. In the 2006 off-season, he was released by the Orlando Predators.

== Post-playing career ==
He returned to school, and received his degree in History, Technology, and Society in August 2007. "

In 2008, Hamilton resigned shortly after joining Georgia Tech’s coaching staff following an arrest. He returned to Georgia Tech in a recruiting role in 2013.

In 2010, he resurrected his coaching career when he became a recruiting intern at Georgia State, which had launched its Georgia State Panthers football team that year. In June 2011, he joined the Panthers' full-time staff as running backs coach. On May 7, 2013, exactly 5 years after submitting his resignation, Hamilton was re-hired by Georgia Tech to provide assistance with recruiting for the Yellow Jackets football team.

Most recently, Hamilton was the co-host of The Locker Room, a morning sports radio program on WCNN in Atlanta, and he was the color analyst for Georgia Tech football radio broadcasts. Dickey Broadcasting president, David Dickey, announced on Monday, September 9, 2024, that Hamilton is no longer an employee of Dickey Broadcasting and will no longer be heard on 680 The Fan in any capacity.

== Collegiate awards and honors ==
- 1996 – Four ACC Rookie of the Week Awards, Runner-up ACC Rookie of the Year
- 1997 – Two ACC Offensive Back of the Week Awards, Georgia Tech MVP for the Year, MVP of 1997 Carquest Bowl vs West Virginia
- 1998 – One ACC Offensive Back of the Week Award, 1st Team All-ACC Quarterback, Co-MVP of 1999 Gator Bowl against Notre Dame, led the team to ending 7 year losing streak to the Georgia
- 1999 – Davey O'Brien Award winner, Runner-up to the 1999 Heisman Trophy, 1st Team All-America Quarterback, 1st Team All-ACC Quarterback, Three ACC Offensive Back of the Week Awards, defeated University of Georgia 51-48 for second straight year in wild overtime victory
- 2000 – Anthony J. McKelvin Award, ACC Male Athlete of the Year
- 2002 – ACC 50th Anniversary Football Team
- 2005 – ACC Football Legends - Inaugural Class
- 2007 – Received degree from Georgia Tech in History, Technology and Society
- 2014 – Inducted into the College Football Hall of Fame

== See also ==
- List of Arena Football League and National Football League players
- List of Georgia Tech Yellow Jackets starting quarterbacks
- Georgia Tech Yellow Jackets football statistical leaders
