= 1990 Georgia Tech vs. Virginia football game =

- Conference game
Georgia Tech Yellow Jackets	Virginia Cavaliers
(6–0–1)	(7–0)
41	38
Head coach: Bobby Ross	Head coach: George Welsh
AP / Coaches; 16 / 14	AP / Coaches; 1 / 1
	1	2	3	4	Total
Georgia Tech	0	14	21	6	41
Virginia	10	18	7	3	38
- Date: November 3, 1990
- Season: 1990
- Stadium: Scott Stadium
- Location: Charlottesville, Virginia
- Referee: C.C. Dailey

United States TV coverage
- Network: CBS
- Announcers: Jim Nantz, Tim Brant, and John Dockery

The 1990 Georgia Tech vs. Virginia football game is an American college football game played on November 3, 1990, between the Georgia Tech Yellow Jackets and the Virginia Cavaliers. Georgia Tech won by a score of 41–38 over top-ranked Virginia. The game was decided by a 37-yard field goal by Scott Sisson with seven seconds remaining. Georgia Tech went on to claim the Atlantic Coast Conference (ACC) championship and a share of the national championship.

== Background ==
The conference matchup of two undefeated teams in midseason drew great national interest. The game was televised nationally by CBS with Jim Nantz handling play-by-play duties. The night before the game, vandals broke into Scott Stadium and set fire to the AstroTurf surface, burning a large midfield patch. The morning of the game, school officials questioned holding the game that day. Field personnel took spare turf from Virginia's baseball field and, after cutting out the burned sections, stitched it into the field as patches, enabling the game to be played as scheduled.

== Game recap ==
Virginia took a 10–0 lead in first quarter and had a 28–14 lead by halftime. However, Georgia Tech took advantage of two third quarter errors by Virginia to tie the game with score of 28–28. First, Tech scored four plays after recovering a Virginia fumble on the opening possession of third quarter. Then Georgia Tech linebacker Calvin Tiggle's interception at the Yellow Jackets 10-yard line stopped the ensuing Virginia drive. Georgia Tech gained field position for quarterback Shawn Jones' 26 yard scoring pass to wide receiver Emmett Merchant. Virginia's quarterback Shawn Moore then countered with long touchdown pass to Herman Moore, but GT running back William Bell tied the game again with score of 35–35 with an 8-yard run late in third quarter. Tech took its first lead at 38–35 with Scott Sisson's 35-yard field goal kick with 7:17 minutes left. Virginia came back, obtaining first-and-goal achieved by a 48 yard Moore-to-Moore pass. However, Virginia was penalized twice during the next five plays, with one nullifying tight end Aaron Mundy's touchdown catch. Virginia had to settle for Jake McInerney's tying field goal kick with 2:30 minutes left. The Yellow Jackets then went 56 yards in five plays to position Sisson for a game-winning field goal with seven seconds left. Key plays in that drive included a Jones-to-Bell 23-yard pass, Bell's 13-yard run on which he fell on his own fumble, and a Jones-to-wide receiver Greg Lester 15-yard pass completion. Georgia Tech quarterback Shawn Jones finished the game with 17 pass completions on 29 attempts for 257 yards and 2 touchdowns. Virginia quarterback Shawn Moore set a Virginia school record with 344 yards passing on 18 completions with 28 attempts.

== Effects ==
Georgia Tech won its remaining games with Virginia Tech (also with a last second Sisson field goal), Wake Forest, and arch-rival Georgia to complete its fifth undefeated regular season in school history at 10–0–1. Virginia's season spiraled downhill from the game, with the Cavaliers going 1–3 to finish 8–4 and ranked #22 (AP) at the season's end. As ACC champion, Georgia Tech received the then-automatic bid to the 1991 Florida Citrus Bowl in Orlando against Nebraska. The Yellow Jackets dominated the Cornhuskers and won the game, 45–21.

Georgia Tech finished the 1990 season with a record of 11–0–1 (eleven wins, no losses, and one tie), while the Colorado Buffaloes' record was 11–1–1, (eleven wins, one loss, and one tie). Georgia Tech tied North Carolina, 13–13, on October 20. Colorado tied Tennessee, 31–31, on August 26 and lost to Illinois, 23–22, on September 15 of that year. On October 6, Colorado controversially defeated Missouri, 33–31, on the game's last official play – a "fifth down". Referees in that game lost count of the downs at the end of the game and inadvertently awarded the Buffaloes a fifth down and goal that resulted in the game's deciding touchdown. Due to its result – and its effect on the 1990 national championship voting – the 1990 Fifth Down Game has subsequently been viewed as one of the most controversial game endings in college football history.

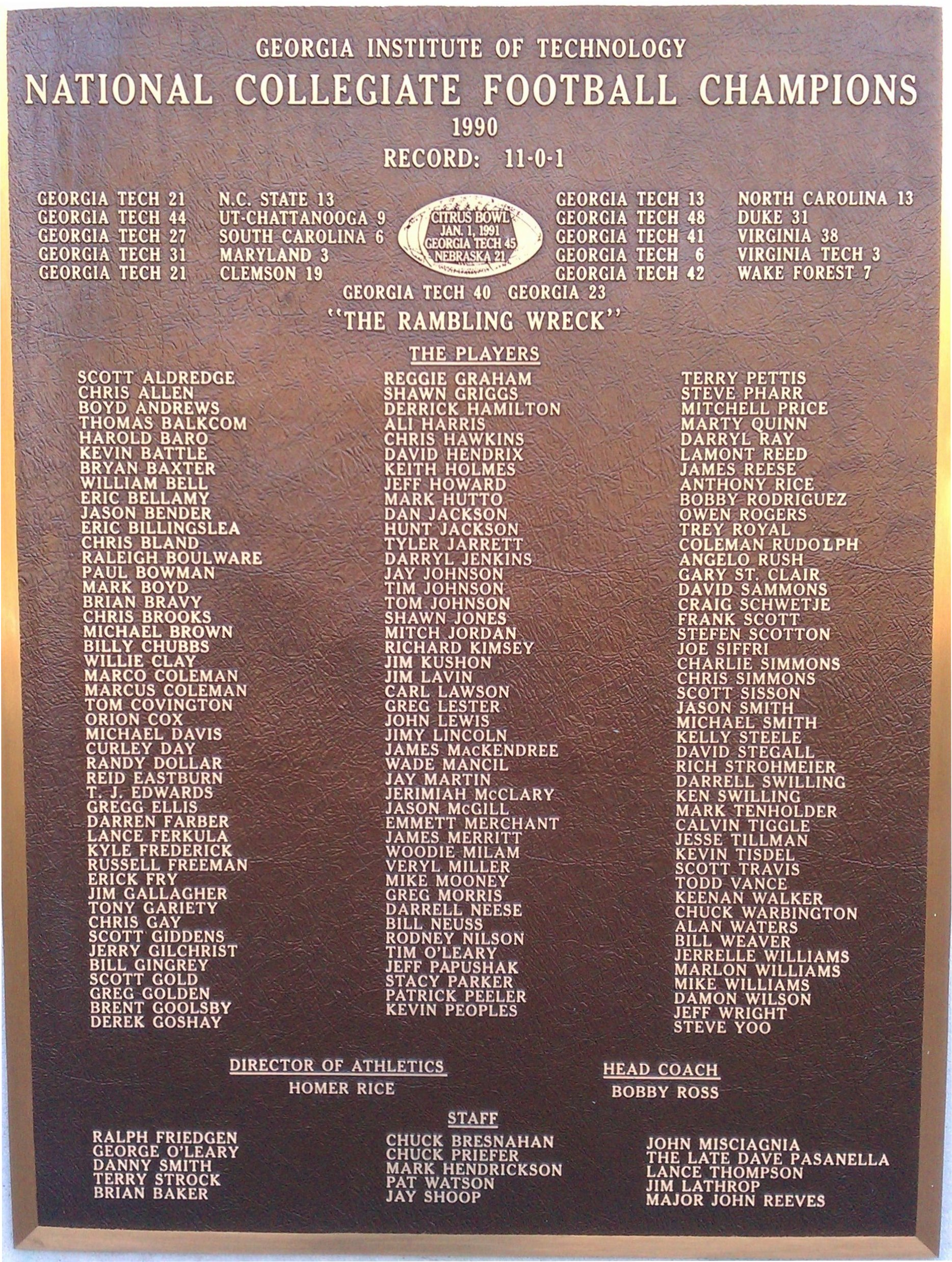
Plaque for Georgia Tech's national championship

The National Collegiate Athletic Association (NCAA) governs American football as played by the teams representing the largest universities in the United States, termed Division I-A (Changed in 2006 to FBS — Football Bowl Subdivision). Although smaller schools participate in formal NCAA tournaments to determine the national college football championships in Divisions I-AA, II, and III, Division I-A lacks such a tournament.

During this time frame, before the College Football Playoff system was implemented, the "mythical national championship" of Division I-A was determined by polls of coaches and/or sportswriters. In the early 1990s, two such polls were regarded as authoritative: A poll of sportswriters conducted by the Associated Press (AP) called the AP Poll, and a poll of college football coaches conducted by the United Press International (UPI) called the Coaches Poll. These polls are conducted weekly during the football season, and the final polls (in January, after all bowl games) determine the championship.

Because 1990 was a year in which no single college football team was undefeated or untied, the Fifth Down controversy played a role in determining the Division I-A national champion for the 1990 season. The Missouri game caused Colorado's ranking to decline to 14th. However, most of the top teams lost in subsequent weeks, while the Buffaloes won their remaining games, including a 27–12 victory in Lincoln over #3 Nebraska and a squeaker over #5 Notre Dame. The Orange Bowl victory over Notre Dame was considered very controversial as well, due to a clipping call on Notre Dame on a punt return touchdown late in the game by Raghib Ismail when Colorado held a 10–9 lead, which would be the final score after Notre Dame was assessed the penalty. A blocked extra point by Colorado turned out to be the winning margin.

Colorado would be crowned 1990 national champion in the AP poll of sportswriters. By one vote, Georgia Tech would be crowned 1990 national champion in the UPI poll of college football coaches, its fourth national title in school history (after 1917, 1928, and 1952). Tom Osborne, then Nebraska head coach (the only school that played both schools that season), cast the deciding vote in favor of the Yellow Jackets.
