= 1990 All-Atlantic Coast Conference football team =

American college football all-star team

The 1990 All-Atlantic Coast Conference football team consists of American football players chosen by various selectors for their All-Atlantic Coast Conference ("ACC") teams for the 1990 NCAA Division I-A football season. Selectors in 1990 included the Associated Press (AP).

Clemson led with seven players being named to the first team. Virginia followed with six first-team selections. The top three vote recipients all played for Virginia's offense: quarterback Shawn Moore and wide receiver Herman Moore, each with 164 points, and running back Terry Kirby with 162 points. Shawn Moore also received the award as the ACC's most valuable player of the 1990 season. Georgia Tech won the ACC championship, finished the season ranked No. 2 in the final AP Poll, and placed five players on the first team.

== Offensive selections ==
=== Wide receivers ===
- Herman Moore, Virginia (AP-1) [164]
- Barry Johnson, Maryland (AP-1) [112]
- Emmett Merchant, Georgia Tech (AP-2) [99]
- Marc Mays, Duke (AP-2) [50]

=== Tight ends ===
- John Henry Mills, Wake Forest (AP-1) [89]
- Tom Covington, Georgia Tech (AP-2) [63]

=== Offensive tackles ===
- Stacy Long, Clemson (AP-1) [129]
- Ray Roberts, Virginia (AP-1) [112]
- Kevin Donnalley, North Carolina (AP-2) [98]
- Darryl Jenkins, Georgia Tech (AP-2) [96]

=== Offensive guards ===
- Joe Siffri, Georgia Tech (AP-1) [145]
- Eric Harmon, Clemson (AP-1) [131]
- Jeb Flesch, Clemson (AP-2) [115]
- Brian Bollinger, North Carolina (AP-2) [87]

=== Centers ===
- Trevor Ryals, Virginia (AP-1) [123]
- Charlie Cobb, NC State (AP-2) [69]

=== Quarterbacks ===
- Shawn Moore, Virginia (AP-1) [164]
- Shawn Jones, Georgia Tech (AP-2) [76]

=== Running backs ===
- Terry Kirby, Virginia (AP-1) [162]
- Ronald Williams, Clemson (AP-1) [133]
- Anthony Williams, Wake Forest (AP-2) [65]
- Randy Cuthbert, Duke (AP-2) [53]

== Defensive selections ==
=== Defensive linemen ===
- Vance Hammond, Clemson (AP-1) [135]
- Chris Slade, Virginia (AP-1) [112]
- Rob Bodine, Clemson (AP-1) [83]
- Joe Hall, Virginia (AP-2) [81]
- Jerimiah McClary, Georgia Tech (AP-2) [75]
- Mike Jones, NC State (AP-2) [72]

=== Linebackers ===
- Calvin Tiggle, Georgia Tech (AP-1 [ILB}) [106]
- Dwight Hollier, North Carolina (AP-1 [ILB]) [103]
- Marco Coleman, Georgia Tech (AP-1 [OLB]) [146]
- Levon Kirkland, Clemson (AP-1 [OLB]) [131]
- Doug Brewster, Clemson (AP-2) [84]
- Tommy Thigpen, North Carolina (AP-2) [84]
- Eric Gash, North Carolina (AP-2) [70]
- John Johnson, Clemson (AP-2) [59]

=== Defensive backs ===
- Ken Swilling, Georgia Tech (AP-1) [143]
- Dexter Davis, Clemson (AP-1) [138]
- Jesse Campbell, NC State (AP-1) [131]
- Willie Clay, Georgia Tech (AP-1) [86]
- Fernandus Vinson, NC State (AP-2) [81]
- Tony Covington, Virginia (AP-2) [76]
- Joe Johnson, NC State (AP-2) [63]
- Jason Wallace, Virginia (AP-2) [45]

== Special teams ==
=== Placekickers ===
- Chris Gardocki, Clemson (AP-1) [143]
- Clint Gwaltney, North Carolina (AP-2) [52]

=== Punters ===
- Chris Gardocki, Clemson (AP-1) [121]
- Scott McAlister, North Carolina (AP-2) [99]

== Key ==
AP = Associated Press selected by members of the Atlantic Coast Sports Writers Association (point totals in brackets: two points for a first-team selection, one point for a second-team selection)
