= 1991 Florida Citrus Bowl =

American college football game

1991 Florida Citrus Growers Association Florida Citrus Bowl
Georgia Tech Yellow Jackets	Nebraska Cornhuskers
(10–0–1)	(9–2)
ACC	Big 8
45	21
Head coach: Bobby Ross	Head coach: Tom Osborne
AP / Coaches; 2 / 2	AP / Coaches; 19 / 13
	1	2	3	4	Total
Georgia Tech	7	17	7	14	45
Nebraska	0	14	7	0	21
- Date: January 1, 1991
- Season: 1990
- Stadium: Florida Citrus Bowl
- Location: Orlando, Florida
- MVP: Shawn Jones (QB, Georgia Tech)
- Favorite: Nebraska by 2 points
- Referee: Tom Quinn (Big Ten)
- Attendance: 73,328

United States TV coverage
- Network: ABC
- Announcers: Brent Musburger, Dick Vermeil and Mark Jones

The 1991 Florida Citrus Bowl was a college football bowl game played after the 1990 regular season, with national championship implications. Played on January 1 in Orlando, Florida, the 45th edition of the Citrus Bowl featured the Georgia Tech Yellow Jackets of the Atlantic Coast Conference and the Nebraska Cornhuskers of the Big Eight Conference.

Georgia Tech came into the game with a 10–0–1 record and #2 ranking, whereas Nebraska was at 9–2 with a #13 UPI coaches' poll ranking. After their win, Georgia Tech climbed to first in the Coaches' Poll, enabling the Yellow Jackets to claim their fourth national championship, shared with Colorado.

== Background ==
ACC Champion Georgia Tech came into the Citrus Bowl as Division I-A's only undefeated team at 10–0–1 and ranked second in both major polls behind 10–1–1 Colorado. The Yellow Jackets had begun the 1990 season unranked, but worked their way up the polls over the course of the year, helped greatly by a 41–38 win over then-#1 Virginia on November 3. Their one blemish was a 13–13 tie at unranked North Carolina on October 20. A potentially controversial situation could result in the polls if Georgia Tech could win the Citrus Bowl and finish the year undefeated, pending the outcome of the Orange Bowl to be played later that night between #5 Notre Dame and Colorado.

The Nebraska Cornhuskers were 9–2 and ranked #13 in the Coaches' poll. Though they had been in the top ten of both polls for most of the season, and as high as #3 with three games to go, two losses in their last three games plummeted them to thirteenth (and nineteenth in the AP poll). Nebraska came into the Citrus Bowl as a slight favorite, despite their inferior record and ranking.

== Game recap ==
Shawn Jones, Georgia Tech's sophomore quarterback, rushed for 46 yards on the fourth play of the game which set up the first touchdown. The Yellow Jackets jumped out to a 21–0 lead during the first half, but Nebraska responded with two touchdowns, narrowing the deficit to 21–14. GT was forced to punt after Nebraska's second touch down. However, Nebraska's punt returner fumbled the ball with Jay Martin of Georgia Tech recovering, which led to a 37-yard field goal by Scott Sisson and a 24–14 halftime lead. GT coach Bobby Ross said after the game, "I thought the fumbled punt was the key to the game. That changed the momentum of the game...Here we were with what we thought was a comfortable lead, and they came back within a matter of a minute, ready to establish momentum. Even though we only got three points out of it, that was one of the big plays we capitalized on."

After blocking a Nebraska field goal on the first possession of the second half, Georgia Tech drove for a touchdown to make the score 31–14. Nebraska's final score of the game made it 31–21 going into the 4th quarter. Georgia Tech's William Bell rushed for two fourth-quarter touchdowns to seal the win 45–21. Jones completed 16 of 23 passes for 277 yards and two touchdowns, ran for one touchdown, and was selected the game's most valuable player. Georgia Tech also played well defensively: Nebraska averaged 330 rushing yards during the season, but Georgia Tech held the Cornhuskers to only 126 rushing yards during the game.

The loss was Nebraska's fourth straight bowl loss, a streak which extended to seven; the Huskers slipped into a tie for 17th in the UPI coaches' poll and 24th in the AP poll.

== Scoring ==
First quarter

- Georgia Tech – Stefen Scotten 2 run (Scott Sisson kick) 11:45

Second quarter

- Georgia Tech – Emmett Merchant 22 pass from Shawn Jones (Sisson kick), 12:23
- Georgia Tech – William Bell 2 pass from Jones (Sisson kick), 7:50
- Nebraska – Johnny Mitchell 30 pass from Tom Haase (Gregg Barrios kick), 6:21
- Nebraska – Derek Brown 50 run (Barrios kick), 5:07
- Georgia Tech – Field goal, Sisson 37, 1:50

Third quarter

- Georgia Tech – Jones 1 run (Sisson kick), 5:33
- Nebraska – William Washington 21 pass from Haase (Barrios kick), 0:30

Fourth quarter

- Georgia Tech – Bell 6 run (Sisson kick), 9:43
- Georgia Tech – Bell 57 run (Sisson kick), 7:43

== Statistics ==
Statistics	Georgia Tech	Nebraska
First downs	19	14
Rushes–yards	44–190	40–126
Passing yards	277	209
Passes	16–23–1	14–25–0
Total yards	467	335
Punts–average	6–40	8–39
Fumbles–lost	2–1	3–2
Turnovers by	2	2
Penalties-yards	5–50	6–69
Time of possession	31:30	28:30
