= Bobby Ross =

American football player and coach (born 1936)

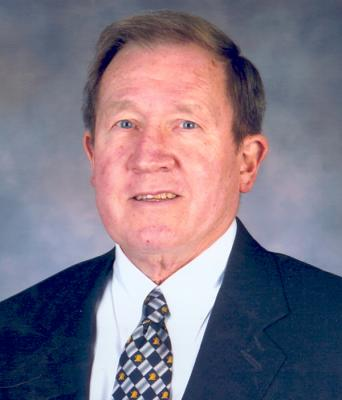
- Ross as Army coach in 2004

Biographical details
- Born: December 23, 1936 (age 89); Richmond, Virginia, U.S.

Playing career
- 1956–1958: VMI
- Positions: Quarterback, defensive back

Coaching career (HC unless noted)
- 1965–1966: VMI (Freshmen/ADB)
- 1967–1968: William & Mary (QB/RB)
- 1969–1970: William & Mary (DB/DC/RC)
- 1971: Rice (LB/RC)
- 1972: Maryland (LB)
- 1973–1977: The Citadel
- 1978–1979: Kansas City Chiefs (ST)
- 1980–1981: Kansas City Chiefs (QB/RB)
- 1982–1986: Maryland
- 1987–1991: Georgia Tech
- 1992–1996: San Diego Chargers
- 1997–2000: Detroit Lions
- 2004–2006: Army

Head coaching record
- Overall: 103–101–2 (college); 77–68 (NFL)
- Bowls: 4–2

Accomplishments and honors

Championships
- 1 National (1990); 4 ACC (1983–1985, 1990); 1994 AFC Championship

Awards
- Bobby Dodd Coach of the Year Award (1990); Paul "Bear" Bryant Award (1990); Sporting News College Football COY (1990); Walter Camp Coach of the Year (1990); Eddie Robinson Coach of the Year (1990); AFCA Coach of the Year (1991); Greasy Neale Award (1992); UPI AFC Coach of the Year (1992); Los Angeles Chargers Hall of Fame; San Diego Chargers 50th Anniversary Team

Robert Joseph Ross (born December 23, 1936) is an American former football coach. He served as the head football coach at The Citadel (1973–1977), the University of Maryland, College Park (1982–1986), Georgia Tech (1987–1991), and the United States Military Academy (2004–2006), compiling a career college football coaching record of 103–101–2. Ross was also the head coach of the National Football League's San Diego Chargers from 1992 to 1996 and the Detroit Lions from 1997 to 2000, tallying a career NFL mark of 77–68. He guided his 1990 Georgia Tech squad to the UPI national championship and coached the 1994 San Diego Chargers to an appearance in Super Bowl XXIX.

== Education and playing career ==
After graduating from Benedictine High School in 1955, Ross enrolled at the Virginia Military Institute, where he started at quarterback and defensive back for two seasons and served as captain of the football team as a senior. Ross graduated from VMI in 1959 with a Bachelor of Arts degree in English and history.

== Coaching career ==
=== Early years ===
Following a tour of duty in the United States Army as a first lieutenant (1960–1962), Ross found work coaching high school football. He coached at Colonial Heights High School, and at his own nearby alma mater of Benedictine, both located near Richmond, Virginia. He then moved on to coaching at the college level, starting with assistant coaching stints at William & Mary, Rice, and Maryland before accepting his first head coaching job in 1973 at The Citadel, The Military College of South Carolina, located in Charleston, South Carolina.

Ross was the 16th head football coach at The Citadel and held that position for five seasons, from 1973 until 1977. His record at The Citadel was 24 –31.

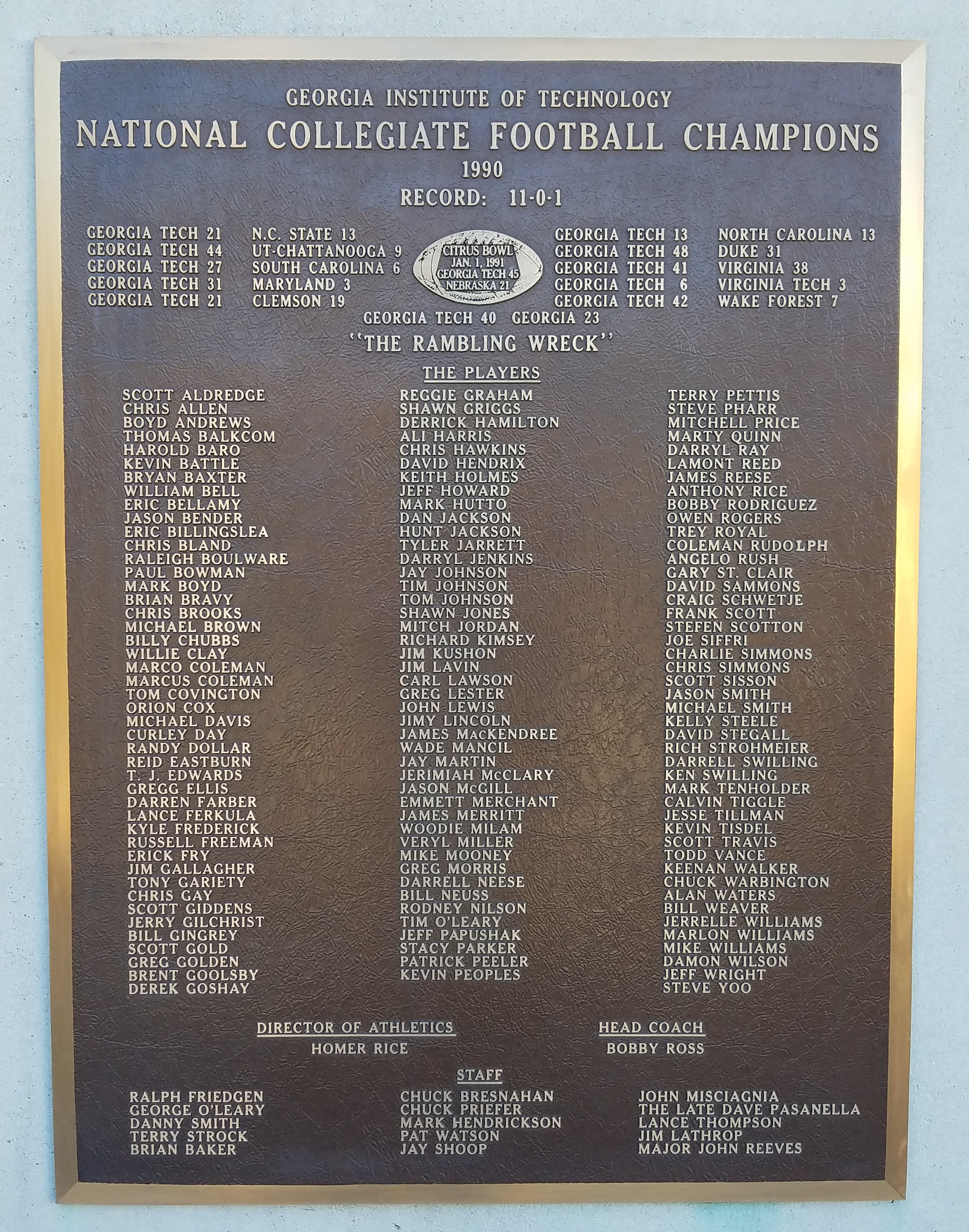
1990 Georgia Tech Yellow Jackets, National Champions

Ross then spent four years as an assistant coach with the Kansas City Chiefs (1978–1981) under head coach Marv Levy, before returning to the collegiate ranks as head coach at Maryland. He won three consecutive Atlantic Coast Conference (ACC) Championships from 1983 to 1985. After five seasons, Ross left Maryland and was introduced as head coach of the Georgia Tech Yellow Jackets football team. on January 5, 1987.

As head coach of Georgia Tech in 1990, he led the Jackets to their best season in years. They started the year unranked, but they rose all the way to eleven by the sixth week of the season, having beat two ranked teams on their way to a 5–0 record. Their one blemish came against North Carolina, whom they tied 13–13 (ties would be abolished by the NCAA years later). After going from 11 to 16 in the AP Poll, the Jackets rolled on, with their best achievement being against Virginia. In that game, 16th ranked Tech faced #1 Virginia on the road. They rallied from a 28–14 halftime deficit to win 41–38 on a Scott Sisson field goal with seven seconds remaining. From there, Tech continued to win and rise in the polls, going from 16th to seventh to fourth to second by the time of their final game of the regular season against Georgia, which they won to clinch an unbeaten record of 11–0–1 record. The ACC championship was the school's first conference title since 1952, while they were still in the Southeastern Conference. As such, they were invited to play in the 1991 Florida Citrus Bowl as ACC championship against Nebraska (ranked 19th in the AP Poll) on January 1, 1991, the same day that #1 Colorado played in the Orange Bowl. The Yellow Jackets prevailed 45–21.

Colorado had gone 5–1–1 against ranked teams (while Tech won all four of their ranked games), but what set off debate was their victory in a game later called the Fifth Down Game, in which an error by the officials helped Colorado prevail over Missouri. A subsequent 10–9 squeaker over Notre Dame in the Orange Bowl led to further debate, as there was no sort of alliance between Division I-A teams to force a national championship game until the Bowl Coalition in 1992.

Later that year, the UPI Coaches' Poll ranked the Yellow Jackets first and were awarded the UPI national championship trophy, while Colorado kept their top spot in the AP Poll. Ross won the Paul "Bear" Bryant Award and the Bobby Dodd Coach of the Year Award.

=== San Diego Chargers ===
On December 31, 1991 (less than a week after the season ended for Georgia Tech), Ross announced his decision to take the head coaching position of the San Diego Chargers. He had been approached by general manager Bobby Beathard about the position days after the team fired Dan Henning. Among the hires to serve under Ross in his first season was Bill Arnsparger, who was hired to serve as defensive coordinator. The 1992 season started with ominous undertones, as presumed starter John Friesz hurt his knee in the preseason that saw him not play a down in the regular season. The Chargers went with trading for Stan Humphries, the backup to Mark Rypien of the Washington Redskins; Humphries would start in week two. The Chargers lost the first four games of the season, which saw them lose by at least eight points in each contest. Facing Seattle, they prevailed 17–6 and proceeded to go on a tear the rest of the regular season, which saw them win all but one remaining game to go 11–5, which was bolstered by Humphries at quarterback to go with a defense led by Junior Seau and Leslie O'Neal. The Chargers clinched the AFC West title win in the last game of the season for their first division title since 1981 and first playoff bid since 1982. As of 2022, the 1992 Chargers are the only team in NFL history to reach the playoffs after starting 0–4. The Chargers won the Wild Card round game against Kansas City before being trounced by Miami in the Divisional Round.

The 1993 season saw injuries to Humphries and inconsistent play that saw them go 8–8 and miss the playoffs. The 1994 season saw an overhaul with a usage of Natrone Means to carry the ball while Tony Martin, Shawn Jefferson and Mark Seay were expected to deliver receiving potential. The team was not expected to contend heavily in the AFC by some in the press. Means would rush for 1,350 yards while the receiving trio caught a combined total of over 2,000 yards from Humphries. San Diego won their first six games to start the season. They split their last four games but managed to finish with eleven wins and an AFC West championship. Their record was good enough for the second seed in the AFC playoffs. Hosting the Dolphins in the Divisional Round, the Chargers got onto a slow start that saw Miami lead 21–6 at halftime. They started the second half with a lengthy seven-minute drive in which Ross elected to go for it on 4th and Goal from the 1. The conversion failed, but it left Miami at the one-yard line. A subsequent tackle in the endzone got the Chargers two points and a free kick, which they converted into a subsequent touchdown to narrow the deficit. Trailing by six, Seay caught the go-ahead touchdown pass with 35 seconds remaining before Miami's last-ditch field goal attempt fell short. San Diego was headed to their first AFC Championship in nearly two decades, and they were matched against the Pittsburgh Steelers. The two teams had met in the final week of the season, which saw San Diego win 37–34. The Steelers were heavy favorites, particularly since they were hosting the Championship Game, with Myron Cope even calling the Charger squad "San Diego beach boys" while one player made discussion of producing and promoting a Super Bowl rap video. Pittsburgh jumped out to an early lead on the strength of an opening drive touchdown. San Diego trailed 13–3 midway through the third quarter. With eight minutes remaining in the quarter, the team went for the big play, and Alfred Pupunu caught a pass from Humphries to go for 43 yards and a touchdown to narrow the score. The Steelers passed for over 300 yards but could not get past the end zone after the opening drive touchdown. In the fourth quarter, Martin caught a pass from Humphries and went 43 yards for the touchdown to give San Diego their first lead with 5:13 remaining. Pittsburgh made a last-ditch attempt at a drive that saw them at the 3-yard line with 4th and goal. However, Dennis Gibson batted the ball away from Steeler hands to clinch the game for San Diego. For the first time ever, the Chargers had won an AFC Championship and reached Super Bowl XXIX. In the Super Bowl, they were 18.5-point underdogs to the San Francisco 49ers. Three plays into the game, the 49ers scored on a touchdown throw. Five minutes into the game, the Chargers were down 14–0 on another touchdown drive by San Francisco. The Chargers were trounced 49–26 in a game that they never led at any point.

The following season was turbulent for the defending AFC champions. The Chargers won three of their first four games but saw two separate skids of three game losing streaks that saw them at 4–7. They won their last five games in a row to narrowly reach the playoffs as a wild card team. They hosted the Indianapolis Colts but lost 35–20. The 1996 season saw the team win four of their first five games, but they sputtered into 4–4 halfway through the season and a three-game losing streak near the end doomed their playoff chances as they finished 8–8. San Diego was in the bottom half of both offense and defense. On January 3, 1997, Ross resigned from the Chargers with two years remaining on his contract. Disagreements with Beathard involved the latter's displeasure with the coordinators of Ross (Ralph Friedgen on offense and Dave Adolph on defense) and the way that the coaching staff used young players. In his press conference, Ross stated, "I did not want this to come about, but it was apparent at the onset of our end-of-the-season discussions that Bobby Beathard felt that our philosophical differences could not be overcome. I was surprised by that, but as time continued it appeared that was the case. I've been through tougher things than this. I think I'll survive." In his five seasons with the Chargers, they won two division titles and made the playoffs three times. His regular season coaching record with the Chargers was 47–33, and 3–3 in the playoffs.

=== Detroit Lions ===
Following the 1996 season, Ross left the Chargers to take a more lucrative, and perhaps more rewarding position as the head coach of the Detroit Lions, where he would have control of all player personnel decisions and be able to hire his own staff. He held the position until the middle of the 2000 season. Detroit had long been considered underachievers under Wayne Fontes (winning one playoff game in his tenure), and Ross was brought in to provide the team a more structured atmosphere. It was a challenging endeavor, as Detroit had developed somewhat of a "country club" atmosphere under Fontes' leadership, and veteran players on the roster ultimately came to resent Ross for running tougher practices, instilling weight requirements, curfews, etc. Ross sought to change the identity of the Detroit Lions, having them become a more traditional, physical, football team, less dependent on Hall of Fame running back Barry Sanders for success.

He structured his drafts accordingly, drafting highly regarded college offensive linemen such as Stockar McDougle and Aaron Gibson, neither of whom panned out professionally. Ultimately, Ross was unable to change the culture in Detroit and lost the trust of his players. He became frustrated at what he perceived to be the team's lack of effort, accusing them of just playing for their paychecks. In November 2000, following a home loss to the Miami Dolphins, having had enough of what he called his team's unwillingness to "fight back," he resigned mid-season. Although his frustration with the Lions organization was evident, Ross later claimed that his primary reason for leaving when he did was due to blood clots in his legs. It is also noteworthy to mention that the 1999 Detroit team achieved the playoffs—albeit with an 8–8 record after losses in the final four regular season games, plus a first-round exit against the Washington Redskins—despite the unexpected retirement of Barry Sanders prior to training camp.

=== Army Black Knights ===
As head coach at Army, Ross reportedly received $600,000 in annual salary, which was seen as evidence of Army's eagerness to right the program after the team's 0–13 record in 2003. During his three-year term as Army head coach, Ross improved their record to 9–25, up from 4–32 over the three years before Ross's arrival. Ross retired from coaching in 2007.

== Personal life ==
Ross and his wife, Alice, have three sons, two daughters, and 18 grandchildren. Their sons Chris and Kevin graduated from the United States Air Force Academy and United States Naval Academy, in 1984 and 1988, respectively. Kevin served for a time as Army's offensive coordinator and running backs coach under his father, but was not kept in that post under Ross's replacement, Stan Brock. Chris is currently the coach for Fairfax Home School's varsity soccer team, based in Fairfax, Virginia.

== Honors ==
In 1997, Ross was inducted into the Virginia Sports Hall of Fame.

== Head coaching record ==
=== College ===
Year	Team	Overall	Conference	Standing	Bowl/playoffs	Coaches^{#}	AP^{°}
The Citadel Bulldogs (Southern Conference) (1973–1977)
1973	The Citadel	3–8	1–6	T–6th			
1974	The Citadel	4–7	2–4	T–6th			
1975	The Citadel	6–5	3–3	3rd			
1976	The Citadel	6–5	2–4	T–6th			
1977	The Citadel	5–6	3–2	2nd			
The Citadel:		24–31	11–19				
Maryland Terrapins (Atlantic Coast Conference) (1982–1986)
1982	Maryland	8–4	5–1	2nd	L Aloha	20	20
1983	Maryland	8–4	5–1	1st	L Florida Citrus		
1984	Maryland	9–3	6–0	1st	W Sun	11	12
1985	Maryland	9–3	6–0	1st	W Cherry	19	18
1986	Maryland	5–5–1	2–3–1	5th			
Maryland:		39–19–1	24–5–1				
Georgia Tech Yellow Jackets (Atlantic Coast Conference) (1987–1991)
1987	Georgia Tech	2–9	0–6	8th			
1988	Georgia Tech	3–8	0–7	8th			
1989	Georgia Tech	7–4	4–3	T–4th			
1990	Georgia Tech	11–0–1	6–0–1	1st	W Florida Citrus	1	2
1991	Georgia Tech	8–5	5–2	2nd	W Aloha		
Georgia Tech:		31–26–1	15–18–1				
Army Black Knights (Conference USA) (2004)
2004	Army	2–9	2–6	T–10th			
Army Black Knights (NCAA Division I-A/FBS independent) (2005–2006)
2005	Army	4–7					
2006	Army	3–9					
Army:		9–25	2–6				
Total:		103–101–2					
National championship Conference title Conference division title or championship game berth
^{#}Rankings from final Coaches Poll.; ^{°}Rankings from final AP Poll.

=== NFL ===
Team	Year	Regular season					Post season			
Team	Year	Won	Lost	Ties	Win %	Finish	Won	Lost	Win %	Result
SD	1992	11	5	0	.688	1st in AFC West	1	1	.500	Lost to Miami Dolphins in AFC Divisional Game
SD	1993	8	8	0	.500	4th in AFC West	—	—	—	—
SD	1994	11	5	0	.688	1st in AFC West	2	1	.677	Lost to San Francisco 49ers in Super Bowl XXIX
SD	1995	9	7	0	.563	2nd in AFC West	0	1	.000	Lost to Indianapolis Colts in AFC wild card game
SD	1996	8	8	0	.500	3rd in AFC West	—	—	—	—
SD Total		47	33	0	.588		3	3	.500	
DET	1997	9	7	0	.563	3rd in NFC North	0	1	.000	Lost to Tampa Bay Buccaneers in NFC Wild Card Game
DET	1998	5	11	0	.313	4th in NFC North	—	—	—	—
DET	1999	8	8	0	.500	3rd in NFC North	0	1	.000	Lost to Washington Redskins in NFC Wild Card Game
DET	2000	5	4	0	.556	Resigned after week 10	—	—	—	—
DET Total		27	30	0	.474		0	2	.000	
Total		74	63	0	.540		3	5	.375	
