= 1991 All-Atlantic Coast Conference football team =

American college football all-star team

The 1991 All-Atlantic Coast Conference football team consists of American football players chosen by various selectors for their All-Atlantic Coast Conference ("ACC") teams for the 1991 college football season. Selectors in 1991 included the Associated Press (AP).

== Offensive selections ==
=== Wide receivers ===
- Terry Smith, Clemson (AP-1)
- Charles Davenport, NC State (AP-1)
- Greg Lester, Georgia Tech (AP-2)
- Corey Holliday, North Carolina (AP-2)

=== Tackles ===
- Ray Roberts, Virginia (AP-1)
- Mike Mooney, Georgia Tech (AP-1)
- Bruce Bratton, Clemson (AP-2)
- Scott Adell, NC State (AP-2)

=== Guards ===
- Jeb Flesch, Clemson (AP-1)
- Brian Bollinger, North Carolina (AP-1)
- Clyde Hawley, NC State (AP-2)
- Pete Petroff, Duke (AP-2)

=== Centers ===
- Mike Brown, Clemson (AP-1)
- Mitch Suplee, Maryland (AP-2)

=== Tight ends ===
- John Henry Mills, Wake Forest (AP-1)
- Frank Wycheck, Maryland (AP-2)

=== Quarterbacks ===
- Matt Blundin, Virginia (AP-1)
- Shawn Jones, Georgia Tech (AP-2)

=== Running backs ===
- Terry Kirby, Virginia (AP-1)
- Natrone Means, North Carolina (AP-1)
- Ronald Williams, Clemson (AP-2)
- Nikki Fisher, Virginia (AP-2)

== Defensive selections ==
=== Defensive linemen ===
- Coleman Rudolph, Georgia Tech (AP-1)
- Rob Bodine, Clemson (AP-1)
- Chester McGlockton, Clemson (AP-1)
- Matt Quigley, Virginia (AP-2)
- Mark Thomas, NC State (AP-2)
- Larry Webster, Maryland (AP-2)

=== Linebackers ===
- Ed McDaniel, Clemson (AP-1)
- Tommy Thigpen, North Carolina (AP-1)
- Marco Coleman, Georgia Tech (AP-1)
- Levon Kirkland, Clemson (AP-1)
- Mike Jarmolowich, Maryland (AP-2)
- Jerrelle Williams, Georgia Tech (AP-2)
- Eric Gash, North Carolina (AP-2)
- Chris Slade, Virginia (AP-2)

=== Defensive backs ===
- Willie Clay, Georgia Tech (AP-1)
- Sebastian Savage, NC State (AP-1)
- Robert O'Neal, Clemson (AP-1)
- George Coghill, Wake Forest (AP-1)
- Mike Reid, NC State (AP-2)
- Greg Jeffries, Virginia (AP-2)
- Keith Lyle, Virginia (AP-2)
- Tommy Smith, North Carolina (AP-2)

== Special teams ==
=== Placekickers ===
- Nelson Welch, Clemson (AP-1)
- Dan DeArmas, Maryland (AP-2)

=== Punters ===
- Ed Garno, Virginia (AP-1)
- Scott McAlister, North Carolina (AP-2)

== Key ==
AP = Associated Press

== See also ==
1991 College Football All-America Team
