= Bruce McGonnigal =

American football player (born 1968)

No. 49
- Position: Tight end

Personal information
- Born: May 1, 1968 (age 58); Cambridge, Massachusetts, U.S.
- Listed height: 6 ft 4 in (1.93 m)
- Listed weight: 229 lb (104 kg)

Career information
- High school: Loyola (Towson, Maryland)
- College: Virginia
- NFL draft: 1991: 9th round, 238th overall pick

Career history
- Pittsburgh Steelers (1991)*; Cleveland Browns (1991)
- * Offseason or practice squad member only

Awards and highlights
- First-team All-ACC (1989)

Career NFL statistics
- Games played: 2
- Stats at Pro Football Reference

Joseph Bruce McGonnigal (born May 1, 1968) is an American former professional football player who was a tight end in the National Football League (NFL). He played college football for the Virginia Cavaliers, and was a starter at the position in 1989 and 1990. In 1989, he set an ACC record for receiving yards by a tight end in a single season, with 634.

== Early life ==
McGonnigal played high school football at Loyola High School, where he helped the Dons end a long losing streak to archrival Calvert Hall in the annual Turkey Bowl game his senior year. MCGonnigal graduated in 1986.

== College career ==
McGonnigal has become an integral part of football folklore at the University of Virginia, where many fans tell varying accounts of how McGonnigal was injured while searching for his girlfriend's dog, some time prior to the game against Georgia Tech in 1990. McGonnigal ruptured his spleen and received a concussion from the fall incurred during the nighttime search. The spleen injury sidelined him for the rest of the 1990 season. At the time of the accident, the Virginia Cavaliers football team was ranked #1 in both major polls. Without McGonnigal, the Cavaliers fell to eventual NCAA champion Georgia Tech, 41–38. Late in the game, with the Cavaliers trailing 38–35, quarterback Shawn Moore threw what would've been a go-ahead touchdown pass to new starting tight end Aaron Mundy; however, the play was overturned because a back-up tight end had not come onto the field causing there a penalty for too few players on the line of scrimmage. Coach George Welsh then elected to kick a tying field goal, but the Yellow Jackets then drove for the winning field goal. Many University of Virginia football fans speculate that had McGonnigal never been injured, the Virginia Cavaliers might have gone on to win at least a share of the NCAA national championship.

== Professional career ==
McGonnigal was selected in the 1991 NFL draft by the Pittsburgh Steelers in the ninth round, but ended up with the Cleveland Browns, where he saw little playing time and closed out his brief NFL career.

== After football ==
McGonnigal took up a career in political campaign management after leaving the NFL.
