= 1990 Virginia Cavaliers football team =

American college football season

1990 Virginia Cavaliers football

Sugar Bowl, L 23–22 vs. Tennessee
- Conference: Atlantic Coast Conference

Ranking
- Coaches: No. 15
- AP: No. 23
- Record: 8–4 (5–2 ACC)
- Head coach: George Welsh (9th season)
- Offensive coordinator: Gary Tranquill (4th season)
- Offensive scheme: I formation
- Defensive coordinator: Frank Spaziani (4th season)
- Base defense: 5–2
- Captains: Ron Carey; Joe Hall; Shawn Moore
- Home stadium: Scott Stadium

1990 Atlantic Coast Conference football standings
	Conf.					Overall
Team	W		L		T	W		L		T
No. 2 Georgia Tech $	6	–	0	–	1	11	–	0	–	1
No. 9 Clemson	5	–	2	–	0	10	–	2	–	0
No. 23 Virginia	5	–	2	–	0	8	–	4	–	0
Maryland	4	–	3	–	0	6	–	5	–	1
North Carolina	3	–	3	–	1	6	–	4	–	1
NC State	3	–	4	–	0	7	–	5	–	0
Duke	1	–	6	–	0	4	–	7	–	0
Wake Forest	0	–	7	–	0	3	–	8	–	0
$ – Conference champion; Rankings from AP Poll

The 1990 Virginia Cavaliers football team represented the University of Virginia as a member of the Atlantic Coast Conference (ACC) during the 1990 NCAA Division I-A football season. Led by ninth-year head coach George Welsh, the Cavaliers compiled an overall record of 8–4 with a mark of 5–2 in conference play, tying for second place in the ACC. Virginia was invited to the Sugar Bowl, where the Cavaliers lost to Tennessee. The Cavaliers offense scored 464 points while the defense allowed 227 points. The team played home games at Scott Stadium in Charlottesville, Virginia.

The 1990 Virginia team is noteworthy for having achieved a No. 1 national ranking in the AP poll for two weeks during the season, starting on October 16 of that year and ending with a loss to Georgia Tech. The Cavaliers held the nation's top spot through the poll of October 30, but losses in three of four games left them unranked in the AP poll by the end of the regular season. It was the first time in the program's history that Virginia had ever earned the No. 1 ranking.

== Schedule ==
Date	Time	Opponent	Rank	Site	TV	Result	Attendance	Source
September 1	2:00 pm	at Kansas*	No. 15	Memorial Stadium; Lawrence, KS		W 59–10	35,000	
September 8	4:00 pm	No. 9 Clemson	No. 14	Scott Stadium; Charlottesville, VA	ESPN	W 20–7	46,800	
September 15	1:00 pm	Navy*	No. 11	Scott Stadium; Charlottesville, VA		W 56–14	39,400	
September 22	12:00 pm	at Duke	No. 10	Wallace Wade Stadium; Durham, NC	JPS	W 59–0	24,862	
September 29	1:00 pm	William & Mary*	No. 7	Scott Stadium; Charlottesville, VA		W 63–35	40,400	
October 13	1:00 pm	NC State	No. 2	Scott Stadium; Charlottesville, VA		W 31–0	44,300	
October 20	1:00 pm	at Wake Forest	No. 1	Groves Stadium; Winston-Salem, NC		W 49–14	23,124	
November 3	2:00 pm	No. 16 Georgia Tech^{†}	No. 1	Scott Stadium; Charlottesville, VA	CBS	L 38–41	49,700	
November 10	12:30 pm	at North Carolina	No. 11	Kenan Memorial Stadium; Chapel Hill, NC (South's Oldest Rivalry)	JPS	W 24–10	41,000	
November 17	12:00 pm	Maryland	No. 8	Scott Stadium; Charlottesville, VA (rivalry)	JPS	L 30–35	43,500	
November 24	7:30 pm	at Virginia Tech*	No. 17	Lane Stadium; Blacksburg, VA (rivalry)	ESPN	L 13–38	54,157	
January 1	8:30 pm	vs. No. 10 Tennessee*		Louisiana Superdome; New Orleans, LA (Sugar Bowl)	ABC	L 22–23	75,132	
*Non-conference game; ^{†}Homecoming; Rankings from AP Poll released prior to the game; All times are in Eastern time

== Rankings ==
Ranking movements Legend: ██ Increase in ranking ██ Decrease in ranking RV = Received votes т = Tied with team above or below ( ) = First-place votes
	Week															
Poll	Pre	1	2	3	4	5	6	7	8	9	10	11	12	13	14	Final
AP	15	14	11	10	7	4 (1)	2 (14)	1 (38)	1 (45)	1 (44)	11	8	17	RV	RV	23
Coaches	21	13	11	9	8	5	3 (10)	1 (29)	1 (39)	1 (35)	9	7	14	23т	23	15

== Game summaries ==
=== Georgia Tech ===
#16 Georgia Tech vs #1 Virginia

Team	1	2	3	4	Total
• Yellow Jackets	0	14	21	6	41
Cavaliers	10	18	7	3	38

- Date: November 3
- Location: Scott Stadium, Charlottesville, Virginia
- Game start: 2:00 PM EST
- Game attendance: 49,700
- Game weather: 80 °F (27 °C), Sunny, Wind S 6 mph (9.7 km/h) mph
- TV announcers (CBS): Jim Nantz, Tim Brant, and John Dockery

Scoring summary
Q1	8:09	UVA	Shawn Moore 1-yard run (McInerney kick)	UVA 7–0
Q1	3:58	UVA	Jake McInerney 27-yard field goal	UVA 10–0
Q2	14:50	UVA	Jake McInerney 51-yard field goal	UVA 13–0
Q2	9:43	GT	Shawn Jones 23-yard run (Sisson kick)	UVA 13–7
Q2	6:42	UVA	Shawn Moore 1-yard run (Herman Moore pass from Shawn Moore)	UVA 21–7
Q2	5:22	GT	Jerry Gilchrist 43-yard pass from Shawn Jones (Sisson kick)	UVA 21–14
Q2	0:36	UVA	Shawn Moore 6-yard run (McInerney kick)	UVA 28–14
Q3	12:47	GT	Jerry Gilchrist 12-yard run (Sisson kick)	UVA 28–21
Q3	4:34	GT	Emmett Merchant 26-yard pass from Shawn Jones (Sisson kick)	Tied 28–28
Q3	3:08	UVA	Herman Moore 63-yard pass from Shawn Moore (McInerney kick)	UVA 35–28
Q3	0:02	GT	William Bell 8-yard run (Sisson kick)	Tied 35–35
Q4	7:17	GT	Scott Sisson 33-yard field goal	GT 38–35
Q4	2:34	UVA	Jake McInerney 22-yard field goal	Tied 38–38
Q4	0:07	GT	Scott Sisson 37-yard field goal	GT 41–38

== Roster ==
1990 Virginia Cavaliers football team roster
Players
Coaches
Offense

Pos.	#	Name	Class
WR	87	Herman Moore	Sr
WR		Derek Dooley	Sr
WR		Brian Satola
WR		Terrence Tomlin
WR		Johnnie Wilson
QB		Shawn Moore	Sr
QB		Matt Blundin
QB		Bobby Goodman
RB		Terry Kirby
RB		Dave Sweeney
RB		Nikki Fisher
RB		Gary Steele
RB		David Brown
RB		Jerrod Washington
RB		Alvin Snead
TE		Bruce McGonnigal
TE		Aaron Mundy
TE		Mark Cooke
OL		Paul Collins
OL		Ray Roberts
OL		Trevor Ryals
OL		Chris Stearns
OL		Jeff Tomlin
OL		Chris Borsari
OL		Mark Dixon
OL		Jim Reid

Defense

Pos.	#	Name	Class
DB		Tony Covington

Special teams

Pos.	#	Name	Class

Head coach

- George Welsh

Coordinators/assistant coaches

Legend

- (C) Team captain
- (S) Suspended
- (I) Ineligible
- Injured
- Redshirt

Roster
Last update: March 22, 2020

== Team players in the NFL ==
The following were selected in the 1991 NFL draft.

Player	Position	Round	Overall	NFL team
Herman Moore	Wide receiver	1	10	Detroit Lions
Tony Covington	Defensive back	4	93	Tampa Bay Buccaneers
Bruce McGonnigal	Tight end	9	238	Pittsburgh Steelers
Shawn Moore	Quarterback	11	284	Denver Broncos
