= Aaron Mills =

American football player (born 1972)

Profile
- Position: Placekicker

Personal information
- Born: July 8, 1972 (age 54)
- Listed height: 5 ft 11 in (1.80 m)
- Listed weight: 180 lb (82 kg)

Career information
- College: Stanford (1991–1994)
- NFL draft: 1995: undrafted

Career history
- San Jose SaberCats (1995–1996)
- Stats at ArenaFan.com

Aaron Scott Mills (born July 8, 1972) is an American former professional football kicker who played in the Arena Football League (AFL) for the San Jose SaberCats from 1995 to 1996. He holds the AFL league record for the longest field goal, with a 63-yard field goal in a 1996 game.

== High school career ==
Playing football at Satellite High School in Satellite Beach, Florida, Mills was a two-time All-State selection as both kicker and punter, and also participated in the Florida-Georgia High School All-Star Game after his senior year.

== College career ==
Mills was a four-year letterman at Stanford University and was both, a kicker and a punter. As a junior punter, he averaged 42.2 yards per punt and was selected All-Pac-10 first team selection.

He currently lives in Las Vegas, Nevada.
