= Marco Coleman =

American football player and coach (born 1969)

Georgia Tech Yellow Jackets
- Title: Defensive line coach

Personal information
- Born: December 18, 1969 (age 56); Dayton, Ohio, U.S.
- Listed height: 6 ft 3 in (1.91 m)
- Listed weight: 270 lb (122 kg)

Career information
- High school: Patterson Cooperative (Dayton, Ohio)
- College: Georgia Tech
- NFL draft: 1992: 1st round, 12th overall pick

Career history

Playing
- Miami Dolphins (1992–1995); San Diego Chargers (1996–1998); Washington Redskins (1999–2001); Jacksonville Jaguars (2002); Philadelphia Eagles (2003); Denver Broncos (2004–2005)

Coaching
- Oakland Raiders (2018) Assistant defensive line coach; Georgia Tech (2019–2021) Defensive ends coach; Michigan State (2022) Defensive line coach & run game coordinator; Georgia Tech (2023–present) Defensive ends coach

Awards and highlights
- Pro Bowl (2000); PFWA All-Rookie Team (1992); National champion (1990); First-team All-American (1991); 2× First-team All-ACC (1990, 1991)

Career NFL statistics
- Tackles: 614
- Sacks: 65.5
- Forced fumbles: 18
- Stats at Pro Football Reference

Marco Darnell Coleman (born December 18, 1969) is an American football coach and former player who is the defensive line coach for Georgia Tech and former assistant defensive line coach for the Oakland Raiders of the National Football League (NFL). A former American football defensive end, the fourteen-year veteran originally was drafted by the Miami Dolphins in the 1992 NFL draft as a first round pick (12th overall). He played at Georgia Tech and won the 1990 college football national championship and went to one Pro Bowl before retiring from professional football after the 2005 season.

== Early life ==
Coleman attended Patterson Cooperative High School in Dayton, Ohio, where he was an all-area linebacker. As a senior, he totaled 84 tackles, 31 sacks, three forced fumbles, six fumble recoveries and blocked an extra point. He lettered three times in football and once in track.

== Playing career ==
=== College ===
Coleman finished his career at Georgia Tech with the all-time leader with 28 sacks record, despite playing just three years. He earned All-Atlantic Coast Conference honors for his junior year, playing 11 games to record 67 tackles, 10 sacks, and one fumble recovery. He helped lead the school to a share of the national championship as a sophomore in 1990 by posting 81 tackles and 13 sacks. Coleman was named second-team All-American by The Sporting News and was named the ACC Defensive Player of the Week after a 12-tackle, five-sack performance vs. Maryland. As a redshirt freshman, he started all season at outside linebacker and totaled 63 tackles and five sacks. While playing at Georgia Tech Coleman wore the number #95.

=== National Football League ===
Pre-draft measurables
Height	Weight	Arm length	Hand span	40-yard dash	10-yard split	20-yard split	20-yard shuttle	Vertical jump	Broad jump	Bench press
6 ft 2 3/4 in (1.90 m)	259 lb (117 kg)	33 7/8 in (0.86 m)	10 3/8 in (0.26 m)	5.18 s	1.81 s	2.96 s	4.44 s	29.0 in (0.74 m)	9 ft 8 in (2.95 m)	18 reps
All values from NFL Combine

==== Miami Dolphins ====
Selected by the Miami Dolphins in the first round (12th pick) of the 1992 NFL draft, Coleman was named the NFL Rookie of the Year by Sports Illustrated and Defensive Rookie of the Year by Football News after finishing his first season with 84 tackles (61 solo), six sacks, and one forced fumble. His six sacks were the third-highest single-season total ever recorded by a Dolphins rookie. He started 15 out of 16 games and started the season at outside linebacker before moving to right defensive end for the last 12 games. He remained a member of the Dolphins for three more seasons. Coleman performed a cameo role opposite actor Jim Carrey in the 1994 movie Ace Ventura: Pet Detective.

==== San Diego Chargers ====
Coleman signed as an unrestricted free agent with the San Diego Chargers, on March 8, 1996. He played with the Chargers for three seasons from 1996 to 1998.

==== Washington Redskins ====
Coleman signed with the Washington Redskins as an unrestricted free agent June 3, 1999 and started all 16 regular season games at right end in his first season as a Redskin. He played with the Redskins from 1999 to 2001.

==== Jacksonville Jaguars ====
Coleman signed with the Jacksonville Jaguars on June 20, 2002, and started all 16 games at left defensive end in his first season as a member of the Jaguars. He only played one season as member of the Jaguars and was cut by the team after the 2002 season.

==== Philadelphia Eagles ====
Coleman signed with the Philadelphia Eagles on September 6, 2003, replacing defensive end Derrick Burgess, who was placed on injured reserve. He played as a reserve in 13 regular-season games without a start. He only played the 2003 season as a member of the Eagles.

==== Denver Broncos ====
Coleman signed with the Denver Broncos as an unrestricted free agent on March 11, 2004, and played as a member of the Broncos for two seasons (2004–2005). He announced his retirement from professional football after the 2005 season.

== Coaching career ==
=== Oakland Raiders ===
On April 5, 2018, the Raiders announced Coleman would be making his coaching debut as an assistant defensive line coach in Jon Gruden's new staff.

=== Georgia Tech ===
In January 2019, Coleman was announced as the Defensive Line Coach for Georgia Tech in Geoff Collins' new staff.

=== Michigan State ===
On February 9, 2022, Michigan State University announced that they hired Coleman as the defensive line coach under head coach Mel Tucker.

=== Georgia Tech (second stint) ===
On January 4, 2023, it was announced that Coleman was hired to be the defensive line coach for the Georgia Tech under head coach Brent Key.

== Personal life ==
Coleman is married to Katrina and has three children, Kabrione, Kennedy, and Kenneth. Coleman completed his college degree at Flagler College in St. Augustine, FL where he earned a B.A. in Business Administration.
