= Matt Blundin =

American football and basketball player (born 1969)

No. 14, 12
- Position: Quarterback

Personal information
- Born: March 7, 1969 (age 57); Darby, Pennsylvania, U.S.
- Listed height: 6 ft 6 in (1.98 m)
- Listed weight: 233 lb (106 kg)

Career information
- High school: Ridley (Folsom, Pennsylvania)
- College: Virginia
- NFL draft: 1992: 2nd round, 40th overall pick

Career history
- Kansas City Chiefs (1992–1995); Scottish Claymores (1995); Chicago Bears (1996)*; Detroit Lions (1997)
- * Offseason or practice squad member only

Awards and highlights
- ACC Player of the Year (1991); First-team All-ACC (1991); Dudley Award (1991)

Career NFL statistics
- Passing attempts: 9
- Passing completions: 2
- Completion percentage: 22.2%
- TD–INT: 0–2
- Passing yards: 15
- Passer rating: 0
- Stats at Pro Football Reference

Matthew Brent Blundin (born March 7, 1969) is an American former professional football player who was a quarterback in the National Football League (NFL). He played both college football and basketball for the Virginia Cavaliers. He was a backup in the NFL for the Kansas City Chiefs and the Detroit Lions during the 1990s.

== Early life ==
Matthew Brent Blundin was born on March 7, 1969, in Darby, Pennsylvania. He was a standout in both football and basketball at Ridley High School in Folsom, Pennsylvania. Blundin was a heavily recruited athlete by a number of colleges.

== College career ==
Penn State recruited Blundin to play college football, however he enrolled at the University of Virginia since he was promised the opportunity to play basketball in addition to football. Blundin had limited basketball offensive skills but was a valuable interior defender and rebounder for the Cavalier basketball team. In 1989, Blundin was part of a Virginia team that advanced to the Elite Eight of the NCAA Tournament. In football, Blundin was the primary back-up to Shawn Moore from 1988 to 1990 and made two starts when Moore was injured. In the first game of the 1991 season, Virginia, which had an explosive offense in 1990, was only able to score 6 points in a loss at Maryland. Blundin then developed a serious bacterial infection in his throwing arm that forced him to miss the next two games, a win over Navy and a narrow road loss to highly ranked Georgia Tech. Although backup Bobby Goodman performed well, especially against Georgia Tech, coach George Welsh did not hesitate to restore Blundin as the starter. Both Blundin and the Cavaliers thrived for the remainder of the regular season, with the only setback a tie at Clemson. The Cavaliers finished the regular season 8–2–1 and were invited to the Gator Bowl, where they suffered a lopsided loss to the Oklahoma Sooners.

Blundin's most noteworthy accomplishment during his college career was that he threw 224 passes over the entire 1991 regular season without throwing a single interception. He also led the ACC in passing efficiency that year and was named the ACC player of the year.

== Professional career ==
Despite Blundin's limited starting experience, his strong arm and 6'7" height resulted in him being drafted in the second round of the 1992 NFL draft by the Kansas City Chiefs. In 1995, he was allocated to the Scottish Claymores of the World League of American Football. Blundin received limited playing time in his career as a backup for the Chiefs and later the Detroit Lions. ESPN broadcaster Chris Berman gave him the nickname Matt "Werewolves of" Blundin which was inspired by the song "Werewolves of London" by Warren Zevon.

Blundin concluded his professional career with the Detroit Lions as the third-string quarterback in 1997. In week 11 against the Washington Redskins, Blundin entered the game in the fourth quarter after injuries to starting quarterback Scott Mitchell and backup quarterback Frank Reich. Blundin attempted one pass, his first since 1994, which was intercepted by Redskins safety Darryl Pounds and returned for a touchdown.

== Career statistics ==
=== NFL ===
| Year | Team | GP | GS | Passing | | | | | | | |
| Year | Team | GP | GS | Cmp | Att | Pct | Yds | Y/A | TD | Int | Rtg |
|---|---|---|---|---|---|---|---|---|---|---|---|
| 1993 | KC | 1 | 0 | 1 | 3 | 33.3 | 2 | 0.7 | 0 | 0 | 42.4 |
| 1994 | KC | 1 | 0 | 1 | 5 | 20.0 | 13 | 2.6 | 0 | 1 | 0.0 |
| 1997 | DET | 1 | 0 | 0 | 1 | 0.0 | 0 | 0.0 | 0 | 1 | 0.0 |
| Career | | 3 | 0 | 2 | 9 | 22.2 | 15 | 1.7 | 0 | 2 | 0.0 |

=== College ===
| Year | Team | Passing | | | | | | | | Rushing | | | |
| Year | Team | Cmp | Att | Pct | Yds | Y/A | TD | Int | Rtg | Att | Yds | Avg | TD |
|---|---|---|---|---|---|---|---|---|---|---|---|---|---|
| 1988 | Virginia | 0 | 1 | 0.0 | 0 | 0.0 | 0 | 0 | 0.0 | 1 | −11 | −11.0 | 0 |
| 1989 | Virginia | 16 | 37 | 43.2 | 264 | 7.1 | 2 | 3 | 104.8 | 7 | −24 | −3.4 | 1 |
| 1990 | Virginia | 28 | 42 | 66.7 | 388 | 9.2 | 2 | 4 | 140.9 | 10 | −20 | −2.0 | 1 |
| 1991 | Virginia | 135 | 224 | 60.3 | 1,902 | 8.5 | 19 | 0 | 159.6 | 30 | 10 | 0.3 | 1 |
| Career | | 179 | 304 | 58.9 | 2,554 | 8.4 | 23 | 7 | 149.8 | 48 | −45 | −0.9 | 3 |

== Personal life ==
In January 2016, Blundin was named the athletic director at Woodberry Forest School, an all-male boarding school near Orange, Virginia.
