= Barry Johnson (American football) =

American football player (born 1968)

No. 86
- Position: Wide receiver

Personal information
- Born: February 1, 1968 (age 58); Baltimore, Maryland, U.S.
- Listed height: 6 ft 2 in (1.88 m)
- Listed weight: 197 lb (89 kg)

Career information
- High school: Herndon (Herndon, Virginia)
- College: Maryland (1987–1990)
- NFL draft: 1991: undrafted

Career history
- Denver Broncos (1991–1992); → Birmingham Fire (1992)*
- * Offseason or practice squad member only

Awards and highlights
- First-team All-ACC (1990)

Career NFL statistics
- Games played: 4
- Receptions: 1
- Receiving yards: 13
- Stats at Pro Football Reference

Barry Wayne Johnson (born February 1, 1968) is an American former professional football player who was a wide receiver for the Denver Broncos of the National Football League (NFL). He played college football for the Maryland Terrapins.

== Early life ==
Johnson was born on February 1, 1968, in Baltimore, Maryland. He attended Herndon High School in Herndon, Virginia, where he played basketball, football and soccer.

== College career ==
Johnson played college football for the Maryland Terrapins from 1987 to 1990 and was a four-year letterman. In 41 games, he caught 106 passes for 1,721 yards and 11 touchdowns. Johnson also returned seven kicks for 109 yards. In 1990, he earned first-team All-Atlantic Coast Conference honors.

== Professional career ==
=== Denver Broncos ===
After going unselected in the 1991 NFL draft, Johnson signed with the Denver Broncos as an undrafted free agent. On August 26, he was waived and signed to the practice squad. On September 14, Johnson was elevated to the active roster. He played in two games and had one catch for 13 yards. On September 30, Johnson was re-signed to the practice squad. On November 30, he was elevated again. Johnson played in two more games before he was released on December 14 and re-signed to the practice squad again. On January 3, 1992, he was signed to the active roster for the Divisional game against the Houston Oilers. On January 11, Johnson was waived by the Broncos. On February 19, he was re-signed to the team. On August 31, Johnson was released.

=== Birmingham Fire ===
On February 20, 1992, Johnson was allocated to the Birmingham Fire of the World League of American Football (WLAF). On March 9, he was placed on the injured reserve with a quadriceps pull. On April 1, Johnson was released by the team.
