= Coleman Rudolph =

American football player (born 1970)

No. 92, 91
- Positions: Defensive end, linebacker

Personal information
- Born: October 22, 1970 (age 56); Valdosta, Georgia, U.S.
- Listed height: 6 ft 4 in (1.93 m)
- Listed weight: 262 lb (119 kg)

Career information
- High school: Valdosta
- College: Georgia Tech
- NFL draft: 1993: 2nd round, 36th overall pick

Career history
- New York Jets (1993); New York Giants (1994–1996)

Awards and highlights
- National champion (1990); First-team All-American (1992); 2× First-team All-ACC (1991, 1992)

Career NFL statistics
- Tackles: 35
- Sacks: 5
- Stats at Pro Football Reference

Coleman Rudolph (born October 22, 1970) is an American former professional football player who was a defensive end in the National Football League (NFL). He played for the New York Jets and the New York Giants. He was a second round draft pick of the Jets in the 1993 NFL draft and suffered a knee injury his rookie year. He played college football for the Georgia Tech Yellow Jackets. He was also inducted as a member of the Valdosta High School Hall of Fame in 2007. He is a member of the Georgia Tech Hall of Fame and was an All American at Georgia Tech in 1992. He also was All ACC in Football in 1991 and 1992. He held Georgia Tech's Sack record at 28.5 and Tackle for Loss record at 52.5 for many years. He was a member of the 1986 Valdosta High State and National Championship teams as well as the 1990 National Championship team at Georgia Tech under Bobby Ross.

He was named Male Co Athlete of the Year in the state of Georgia in 1992 along with Garrison Hearst and was recently voted as a "Top 50" greatest athletes in Georgia Tech History and named to the "All Georgia Tech Century Football Team". He was a Captain his Senior year at Georgia Tech and named the "ABC Player of the Game" vs. North Carolina in 1992. He was a first-team all Academic ACC member.

Following his NFL career, Coleman entered into private real estate investment business and then joined Morgan Stanley in 2001. Coleman is currently a senior vice president at Morgan Stanley and is also a CFP (TM). He resides in Atlanta with his family. He has coached at Blessed Trinity High School in Roswell where in 5 years they went to 3 State Championship games and won 2. Coleman is currently the defensive line coach at Fellowship Christian School in Roswell. His father, Jack Rudolph, also played in the NFL for the Boston Patriots and Miami Dolphins.
