= Willie Clay =

American football player (born 1970)

No. 32, 42
- Position: Safety

Personal information
- Born: September 5, 1970 (age 56); Pittsburgh, Pennsylvania, U.S.
- Listed height: 5 ft 10 in (1.78 m)
- Listed weight: 193 lb (88 kg)

Career information
- High school: Linsly School (Wheeling, West Virginia)
- College: Georgia Tech
- NFL draft: 1992: 8th round, 221st overall pick

Career history
- Detroit Lions (1992–1995); New England Patriots (1996–1998); New Orleans Saints (1999)

Awards and highlights
- New England Patriots 1990s All-Decade Team; National champion (1990); Second-team All-American (1991); 2× First-team All-ACC (1990, 1991)

Career NFL statistics
- Tackles: 507
- Interceptions: 27
- Fumble recoveries: 6
- Stats at Pro Football Reference

Willie James Clay (born September 5, 1970) is an American former professional football player who was a safety in the National Football League (NFL). He played college football for the Georgia Tech Yellow Jackets. He was selected in the eighth round (221st overall) of the 1992 NFL draft by the Detroit Lions.

Clay was also a member of the New England Patriots and New Orleans Saints.

== Early life ==
Clay, who was born in Pittsburgh, Pennsylvania, attended Linsly High School in Wheeling, West Virginia where he earned twelve varsity letters playing football, basketball, and baseball.

While in college at Georgia Tech, he made 16 career interceptions to break the school record (formerly 14) and was part of the 1990 Georgia Tech Yellow Jackets football team that won the now-defunct UPI NCAA national championship.

== Professional career ==
Clay was selected in the eighth round (221st overall) of the 1992 NFL draft by the Detroit Lions. He played for the Lions until 1995, after which he spent three seasons with the New England Patriots, and his final season with the New Orleans Saints. During his time with the Patriots, he earned the nickname "Big Play" for his interception during the Patriots victory over the Jacksonville Jaguars in the AFC Championship that sent the Patriots to the second Super Bowl in franchise history.

In March 2009, he was named a member of the New England Patriots 1990s All-Decade Team.

== Personal life ==
Clay is the nephew of Dwight Clay who was a basketball player for the University of Notre Dame. Dwight Clay was nicknamed "The Iceman" and is famous for hitting the game winning jump shot that ended UCLA's NCAA all-time record 88-game winning streak on January 19, 1974.
