= Northern Virginia Independent Athletic Conference =

The Northern Virginia Independent Athletic Conference, commonly known as NVIAC, is a Northern Virginia-based athletics league; it includes both high school and middle school teams. Founded in 1997, NVIAC is composed of nine member schools or organizations, and one provisional member, Dominion Christian School. NVIAC sports include boys' baseball, boys' and girls' basketball, boys' and girls' cross country, boys' football, boys' and girls' soccer, and girls volleyball. Typically, at the end of the season, a tournament is held for each age group (middle school boys, girls; varsity boys, girls, and occasionally junior varsity boys and girls).

The current president is Tony Pangle of County Christian School.

== Organizations ==
Name	Location	Abbreviation	Mascot	Sports
(Virginia) Ad Fontes Academy	Centreville	AFA	Falcons	Baseball, Basketball, Cross Country, Soccer, Volleyball
(Virginia) Christ Chapel Academy	Woodbridge	CCA	Lions	Basketball, Cross Country, Football, Soccer, Volleyball
(Virginia) County Christian School (former)	Ashburn	CCS	Knights	Basketball, Cross Country, Football, Volleyball
(Virginia) Calvary Road Christian School	Alexandria	CRCS	Crusaders	Basketball, Cross Country, Football, Soccer, Volleyball
(Virginia) Dominion Christian School	Oakton	DCS	Eagles	Basketball, Cross Country
(Virginia) Fairfax Christian School	Dulles	FCS	Colonials	Basketball, Cross Country, Soccer, Volleyball
(Virginia) Fairfax Home School	Fairfax	FHS	Hawks	Baseball, Basketball, Cross Country, Soccer, Volleyball
(Virginia) Hearts Home School	Reston	HHS	Lions	Baseball, Basketball, Cross Country, Soccer, Volleyball
(Virginia) Islamic Saudi Academy	Alexandria	ISA	Falcons	Basketball, Football, Soccer, Volleyball
Virginia Academy	Ashburn	VAA	Patriots	Basketball, Football, Soccer, Volleyball
