= Paul "Bear" Bryant Award =

American football award for coaching

- Awarded for: NCAA college football's national coach of the year
- Country: United States
- Presented by: American Heart Association; National Sports Media Association

History
- First award: 1986
- Most recent: Curt Cignetti, Indiana (2025)
- Website: https://bryantawards.org/

The American Heart Association (AHA) Paul "Bear" Bryant Awards are an annual awards banquet that is hosted each year in January, in Houston, Texas, by the AHA. There are two awards. One of them—the Paul "Bear" Bryant Coach of the Year Award—has been given annually since 1986 to NCAA college football's national coach of the year. The Award was named in honor of longtime Alabama coach Bear Bryant after he died of a heart attack in 1983, just four weeks after he retired as the Alabama Crimson Tide coach. The award is voted on by the National Sports Media Association (formerly the National Sportscasters and Sportswriters Association) and proceeds from the awards ceremony benefit the Houston chapter of the American Heart Association, which is the organizing sponsor—since 1986, at the request of the Bryant family—and which obtains a "presenting sponsor" (currently Marathon Oil Corporation). The College Football Coach of the Year Award began in 1957 and was renamed for Bryant in 1986. Bryant himself won the AFCA Coach of the Year award in 1961, 1971, and 1973.

According to the official website:

The Paul Bear Bryant College Football Coaching Awards is an exclusive event that honors a college football coach whose great accomplishments, both on and off the field, are legendary. The award recognizes the masters of coaching and allows them to take their deserved place in history beside other legends like Bear Bryant.

Unlike many college football head coaching awards, it is presented after each season's bowl games.

In 2000, the AHA began presenting a second award, the Paul "Bear" Bryant Lifetime Achievement Award. A third award, the Paul "Bear" Bryant Newcomer Coach of the Year Award, was added in 2023, honoring the top coach in his first season as a head coach in Division I FBS.

== Winners ==
Note: The year indicates the season for which the award was presented. The award is presented in January of the following year.

Year	Winner	School
1986	Joe Paterno	Penn State
1987	Dick MacPherson	Syracuse
1988	Lou Holtz	Notre Dame
1989	Bill McCartney	Colorado
1990	Bobby Ross	Georgia Tech
1991	Don James	Washington
1992	Gene Stallings	Alabama
1993	Terry Bowden	Auburn
1994	Rich Brooks	Oregon
1995	Gary Barnett	Northwestern
1996	Bruce Snyder	Arizona State
1997	Lloyd Carr	Michigan
1998	Bill Snyder	Kansas State
1999	Frank Beamer	Virginia Tech
2000	Bob Stoops	Oklahoma
2001	Larry Coker	Miami (FL)
2002	Jim Tressel	Ohio State
2003	Nick Saban	LSU
2004	Tommy Tuberville	Auburn
2005	Mack Brown	Texas
2006	Chris Petersen	Boise State
2007	Mark Mangino	Kansas
2008	Kyle Whittingham	Utah
2009	Chris Petersen (2)	Boise State
2010	Gene Chizik	Auburn
2011	Mike Gundy	Oklahoma State
2012	Bill O'Brien	Penn State
2013	Gus Malzahn	Auburn
2014	Gary Patterson	TCU
2015	Dabo Swinney	Clemson
2016	Dabo Swinney (2)	Clemson
2017	Scott Frost	UCF
2018	Dabo Swinney (3)	Clemson
2019	Ed Orgeron	LSU
2020	Nick Saban (2)	Alabama
2021	Luke Fickell	Cincinnati
2022	Sonny Dykes	TCU
2023	Mike Norvell	Florida State
2024	Marcus Freeman	Notre Dame
2025	Curt Cignetti	Indiana

== Lifetime Achievement Award winners ==
See footnote.

2000 – Darrell Royal
2001 – Charles McClendon
2002 – Bill Yeoman
2003 – Frank Broyles
2004 – Gene Stallings
2005 – Lou Holtz
2006 – Jack Pardee
2007 – Bo Schembechler
2008 – Tom Osborne
2009 – Barry Switzer
2010 – Vince Dooley
2011 – Bobby Bowden
2012 – Hayden Fry
2013 – LaVell Edwards
2014 – R. C. Slocum
2015 – Jimmy Johnson
2016 – Mack Brown
2017 – Barry Alvarez
2018 – Steve Spurrier
2019 – Frank Beamer
2020 – Bill Snyder
2021 – Howard Schnellenberger
2022 - John Robinson
2023 - Lloyd Carr
2024 - Grant Teaff
2025 - Phillip Fulmer
2026 - Jackie Sherrill

== Newcomer Coach of the Year Award winners ==
Note: While the Newcomer Award is presented in January of the calendar year following the award season, it is announced in December.

Year	Winner	School
2023	David Braun	Northwestern
2024	Fran Brown	Syracuse
2025	Jerry Mack	Kennesaw State

== See also ==
- AFCA Coach of the Year
- Associated Press College Football Coach of the Year Award
- Walter Camp Coach of the Year
- Bobby Dodd Coach of the Year Award
- The Home Depot Coach of the Year Award
- Sporting News College Football Coach of the Year
