= Ken Swilling =

American football player (born 1970)

No. 1
- Position: Defensive back

Personal information
- Born: September 25, 1970 (age 56); Toccoa, Georgia, U.S.
- Listed height: 6 ft 2 in (1.88 m)
- Listed weight: 245 lb (111 kg)

Career information
- College: Georgia Tech
- NFL draft: 1992: 7th round, 184th overall pick

Career history
- Tampa Bay Buccaneers (1992)*; Cleveland Browns (1992); New England Patriots (1993)*; Arizona Cardinals (1994)*
- * Offseason or practice squad member only

Awards and highlights
- National champion (1990); Unanimous All-American (1990); Third-team All-American (1989); 2× First-team All-ACC (1989, 1990)

Jerry Kenneth Swilling (born September 25, 1970) is an American former professional football player who played defensive back for one season with the Cleveland Browns of the National Football League (NFL). He played high school football at Stephens County and college football for the Georgia Tech Yellow Jackets. He was selected by the Tampa Bay Buccaneers in the seventh round of the 1992 NFL draft.

== College career ==
Swilling played Defensive Back for the Yellow Jackets from 1988 through 1991. He was an All-American and member of the 1990 National Championship team. Ken had a nickname of "Captain America" while at Tech. "If you were to draw a picture of a football player in a uniform, you'd draw Ken Swilling," said Coach Bobby Ross in a Sports Illustrated interview; "He's the guy you want to get off the bus first when you go visiting." Swilling is said to have called an undefeated season before the 1990 schedule began after supposedly having a dream that it would happen.

=== Records and accomplishments ===
- 1990 National Championship Team
- 1990 AP All-American
- 1989 and 1990 All-ACC
- ACC 50th Anniversary Team
