= 1990 Georgia Tech Yellow Jackets football team =

American college football season

1990 Georgia Tech Yellow Jackets football
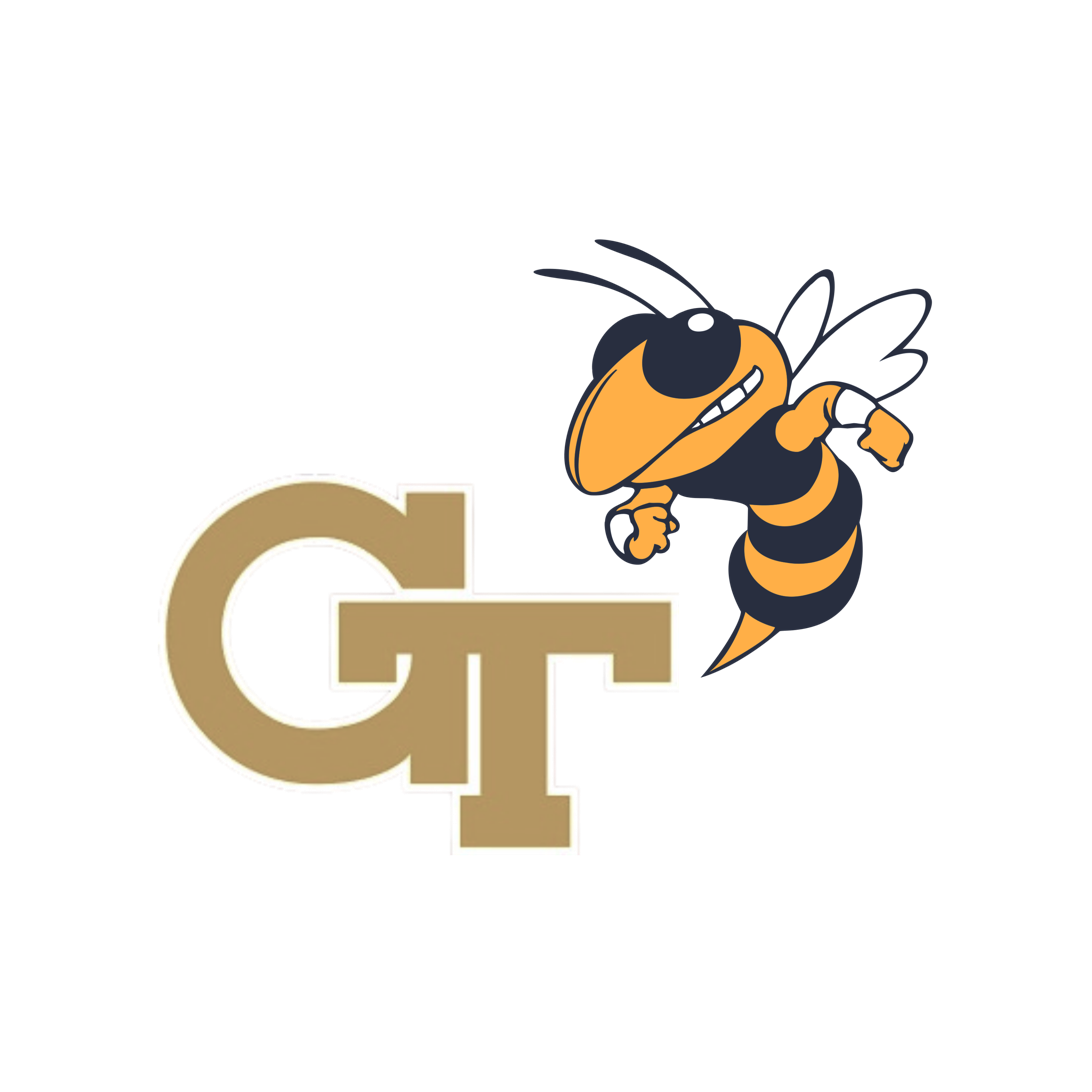

Coaches' Poll national champion ACC champion Florida Citrus Bowl champion

Florida Citrus Bowl, W 45–21 vs. Nebraska
- Conference: Atlantic Coast Conference

Ranking
- Coaches: No. 1
- AP: No. 2
- Record: 11–0–1 (6–0–1 ACC)
- Head coach: Bobby Ross (4th season)
- Offensive coordinator: Ralph Friedgen (4th season)
- Offensive scheme: Pro-style
- Defensive coordinator: George O'Leary (4th season)
- Base defense: 3–4
- Captains: Darryl Jenkins; Jerimiah McClary; Thomas Balkcom; Joe Siffri
- Home stadium: Bobby Dodd Stadium

1990 Atlantic Coast Conference football standings
	Conf.					Overall
Team	W		L		T	W		L		T
No. 2 Georgia Tech $	6	–	0	–	1	11	–	0	–	1
No. 9 Clemson	5	–	2	–	0	10	–	2	–	0
No. 23 Virginia	5	–	2	–	0	8	–	4	–	0
Maryland	4	–	3	–	0	6	–	5	–	1
North Carolina	3	–	3	–	1	6	–	4	–	1
NC State	3	–	4	–	0	7	–	5	–	0
Duke	1	–	6	–	0	4	–	7	–	0
Wake Forest	0	–	7	–	0	3	–	8	–	0
$ – Conference champion; Rankings from AP Poll

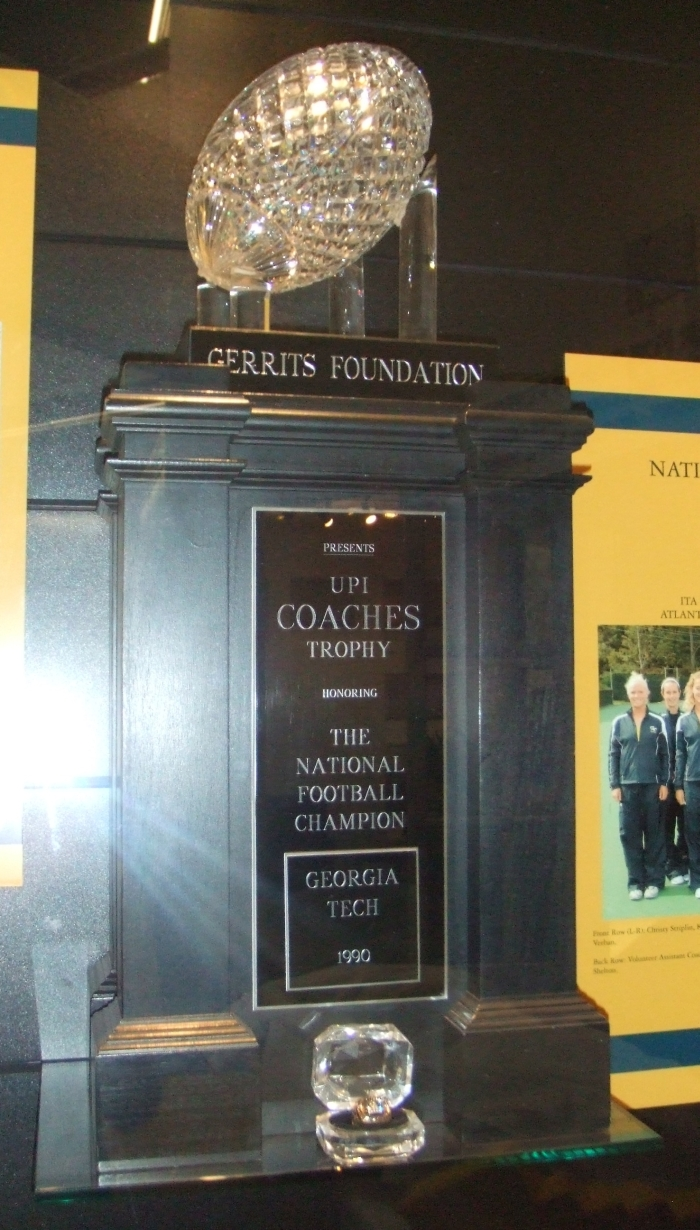
1990 AFCA National Championship Trophy awarded to Georgia Tech

The 1990 Georgia Tech Yellow Jackets football team represented the Georgia Institute of Technology in the 1990 NCAA Division I-A football season. The Jackets posted an undefeated 11–0–1 record. For the season the Yellow Jackets offense scored 379 points while the defense allowed 186 points. Highlights from the season included a nationally televised win over #1 Virginia on the road and a defeat of archrival Georgia for the second consecutive year. Georgia Tech capped off the season by defeating Nebraska, 45–21, in the Florida Citrus Bowl. Head coach Bobby Ross and the Yellow Jackets were awarded a share of the national championship, winning the UPI Poll title by one vote over Colorado, who won the AP Poll title. The team was selected national champion by the UPI coaches poll, Dunkel, and Sagarin (ELO-Chess), while co-national champion by both FACT and NCF.

== Schedule ==
Date	Time	Opponent	Rank	Site	TV	Result	Attendance	Source
September 8	12:00 pm	NC State		Bobby Dodd Stadium; Atlanta, GA	JPS	W 21–13	40,021	
September 22	1:00 pm	Chattanooga*		Bobby Dodd Stadium; Atlanta, GA		W 44–9	32,911	
September 29	4:00 pm	No. 25 South Carolina*		Bobby Dodd Stadium; Atlanta, GA	ESPN	W 27–6	46,011	
October 6	12:00 pm	at Maryland	No. 23	Byrd Stadium; College Park, MD	JPS	W 31–3	31,941	
October 13	12:00 pm	No. 15 Clemson	No. 18	Bobby Dodd Stadium; Atlanta, GA	JPS	W 21–19	46,066	
October 20	1:30 pm	at North Carolina	No. 11	Kenan Memorial Stadium; Chapel Hill, NC		T 13–13	48,000	
October 27	12:00 pm	Duke	No. 16	Bobby Dodd Stadium; Atlanta, GA	JPS	W 48–31	44,061	
November 3	2:00 pm	at No. 1 Virginia	No. 16	Scott Stadium; Charlottesville, Virginia	CBS	W 41–38	49,700	
November 10	1:00 pm	Virginia Tech*	No. 7	Bobby Dodd Stadium; Atlanta, GA		W 6–3	43,011	
November 17	1:00 pm	at Wake Forest	No. 4	Groves Stadium; Winston-Salem, NC		W 42–7	13,493	
December 1	12:30 pm	at Georgia*	No. 2	Sanford Stadium; Athens, GA (Clean, Old-Fashioned Hate)	TBS	W 40–23	82,122	
January 1	1:30 pm	vs. No. 19 Nebraska*	No. 2	Florida Citrus Bowl; Orlando, FL (Citrus Bowl)	ABC	W 45–21	72,328	
*Non-conference game; Rankings from AP Poll released prior to the game; All times are in Eastern time; Source:

== Rankings ==
Ranking movements Legend: ██ Increase in ranking ██ Decrease in ranking — = Not ranked ( ) = First-place votes
	Week															
Poll	Pre	1	2	3	4	5	6	7	8	9	10	11	12	13	14	Final
AP	—	—	—	—	—	23	18	11	16	16	7	4	3 (8)	2 (10)	2 (16)	2 (20)
Coaches	—	—	—	—	—	18	15	11	12	14	7	5	3 (4)	3 (3)	2 (7)	1 (30)

== Game summaries ==
=== At Virginia ===
#16 Georgia Tech at #1 Virginia

Team	1	2	3	4	Total
• Yellow Jackets	0	14	21	6	41
Cavaliers	10	18	7	3	38

- Date: November 3
- Location: Scott Stadium, Charlottesville, Virginia
- Game start: 2:00 PM EST
- Game attendance: 49,700
- Game weather: 80 °F (27 °C), Sunny, Wind S 6 mph (9.7 km/h) mph
- TV announcers (CBS): Jim Nantz, Tim Brant, and John Dockery

Scoring summary
Q1	8:09	UVA	Shawn Moore 1-yard run (McInerney kick)	UVA 7–0
Q1	3:58	UVA	Jake McInerney 27-yard field goal	UVA 10–0
Q2	14:50	UVA	Jake McInerney 51-yard field goal	UVA 13–0
Q2	9:43	GT	Shawn Jones 23-yard run (Sisson kick)	UVA 13–7
Q2	6:42	UVA	Shawn Moore 1-yard run (Herman Moore pass from Shawn Moore)	UVA 21–7
Q2	5:22	GT	Jerry Gilchrist 43-yard pass from Shawn Jones (Sisson kick)	UVA 21–14
Q2	0:36	UVA	Shawn Moore 6-yard run (McInerney kick)	UVA 28–14
Q3	12:47	GT	Jerry Gilchrist 12-yard run (Sisson kick)	UVA 28–21
Q3	4:34	GT	Emmett Merchant 26-yard pass from Shawn Jones (Sisson kick)	Tied 28–28
Q3	3:08	UVA	Herman Moore 63-yard pass from Shawn Moore (McInerney kick)	UVA 35–28
Q3	0:02	GT	William Bell 8-yard run (Sisson kick)	Tied 35–35
Q4	7:17	GT	Scott Sisson 33-yard field goal	GT 38–35
Q4	2:34	UVA	Jake McInerney 22-yard field goal	Tied 38–38
Q4	0:07	GT	Scott Sisson 37-yard field goal	GT 41–38

The most notable victory for the Yellow Jackets came on November 3 against #1 ranked Virginia at Scott Stadium. The game was televised nationally by CBS with Jim Nantz handling play-by-play duties. Georgia Tech won 41–38 thanks to a 37-yard field goal by Scott Sisson with seven seconds remaining. The win vaulted Georgia Tech to the #7 ranking in both major polls.

=== Virginia Tech ===
Virginia Tech at #7 Georgia Tech

Team	1	2	3	4	Total
Hokies	0	0	0	3	3
• Yellow Jackets	0	0	0	6	6

- Date: November 10
- Location: Bobby Dodd Stadium, Atlanta, Georgia
- Game start: 1:00 PM EST
- Elapsed time: 2:40
- Game attendance: 43,011
- Game weather: 47 °F (8 °C), Cold, overcast, damp, Wind NW 15–25 mph (24–40 km/h) mph
- Referee: Courtney Mauzy

Scoring summary
Q4	8:16	VT	M. Thomas 22-yard field goal	VT 3–0
Q4	5:09	GT	Scott Sisson 33-yard field goal	Tied 3–3
Q4	0:08	GT	Sisson 38-yard field goal	GT 6–3

=== Vs. Nebraska (Citrus Bowl) ===
#19 Nebraska vs #2 Georgia Tech

Team	1	2	3	4	Total
Cornhuskers	0	14	7	0	21
• Yellow Jackets	7	17	7	14	45

- Date: January 1
- Location: Citrus Bowl, Orlando, Florida
- Game start: 1:30 PM EST
- Game attendance: 72,328
- TV announcers (ABC): Brent Musburger and Dick Vermeil

Scoring summary
Q1	11:45	GT	Stefen Scotton 2-yard run (Scott Sisson kick)	GT 7–0
Q2	12:23	GT	Emmett Merchant 22-yard pass from Shawn Jones (Sisson kick)	GT 14–0
Q2	7:50	GT	William Bell 2-yard pass from Jones (Sisson kick)	GT 21–0
Q2	6:21	NEB	Johnny Mitchell 30-yard pass from Tom Haase (Gregg Barrios kick)	GT 21–7
Q2	5:07	NEB	Derek Brown 50-yard run (Barrios kick)	GT 21–14
Q2	1:50	GT	Sisson 37-yard field goal	GT 24–14
Q3	5:33	GT	Jones 1-yard run (Sisson kick)	GT 31–14
Q3	0:30	NEB	William Washington 21-yard pass from Haase (Barrios kick)	GT 31–21
Q4	9:43	GT	Bell 6-yard run (Sisson kick)	GT 38–21
Q4	7:43	GT	Bell 57-yard run (Sisson kick)	GT 45–21

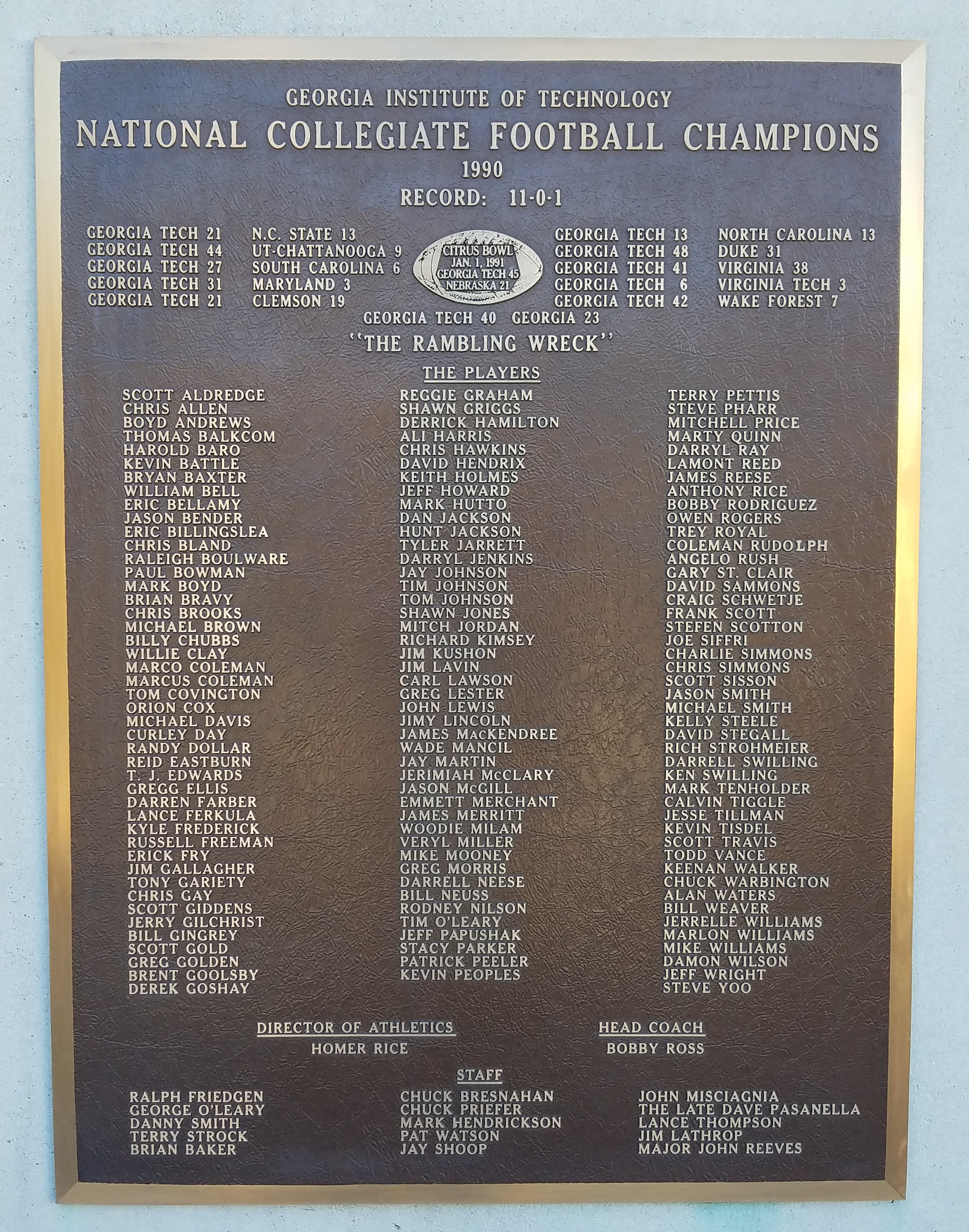
Plaque at Georgia Tech honoring their National Championship season

== Roster ==
1990 Georgia Tech Yellow Jackets football team roster
Players
Coaches
Offense

Pos.	#	Name	Class
RB	36	William Bell	So
C	59	Billy Chubbs	Jr
TE	17	Tom Covington	Jr
WR	8	Jerry Gilchrist	Sr
OT	66	Darryl Jenkins	Sr
QB	10	Shawn Jones	So
G	65	Jim Lavin	Sr
WR	25	Greg Lester	Jr
WR	12	Emmett Merchant	Jr
C	60	Veryl Miller	Sr
OT	70	Mike Mooney	Jr
WR	3	Bobby Rodriguez	So
FB	40	Stefen Scotton	Sr
G	62	Joe Siffri	Sr
RB	21	Kevin Tisdel	So
FB	22	Carl Lawson	So

Defense

Pos.	#	Name	Class
SS	43	Thomas Balkcom	Sr
NG	98	Kevin Battle	So
DB	4	Willie Clay	Jr
LB	95	Marco Coleman	So
LB	93	Orion Cox	Sr
CB	30	Keith Holmes	Sr
SS	80	Jay Martin	Sr
DT	96	Jerimiah McClary	Sr
DT	92	Coleman Rudolph	So
LB	99	Chris Simmons	Sr
LB	86	Rich Strohmeier	So
FS	1	Ken Swilling	Jr
LB	58	Calvin Tiggle	Sr
LB	45	Jerrelle Williams	Jr
LB	56	Marlon Williams	Fr

Special teams

Pos.	#	Name	Class
P	5	Scott Aldredge	Sr
K	9	Scott Sisson	So

Head coach

- Bobby Ross

Coordinators/assistant coaches

- Ralph Friedgen – Offensive coordinator/quarterbacks
- Danny Smith – Running backs
- Terry Strock – Wide receivers
- Mark Hendrickson – Tight ends/special teams
- Pat Watson – Offensive line
- George O'Leary – Defensive coordinator/defensive line
- Chuck Bresnahan – Inside linebackers
- Brian Baker – Outside linebacker
- Chuck Priefer – Defensive backs
- Chris Rorke – Graduate assistant

Legend

- (C) Team captain
- (S) Suspended
- (I) Ineligible
- Injured
- Redshirt

Roster

== Awards and honors ==
- Bobby Ross – Bobby Dodd Coach of the Year Award, Paul "Bear" Bryant Award, Sporting News College Football Coach of the Year, Walter Camp Coach of the Year Award, Eddie Robinson Coach of the Year Award, ACC Coach of the Year
- Ken Swilling – Consensus First-team All-American

== Team players drafted into the NFL ==
Player	Position	Round	Pick	NFL club
Calvin Tiggle	Linebacker	7	174	Tampa Bay Buccaneers
Jim Lavin	Guard	10	268	Cincinnati Bengals
Willie "Big Play" Clay	Cornerback	8	221	Detroit Lions

Source.
