= Dominion Christian School =

Coordinates: 38.906°N 77.325°W

- Herndon and Oakton, Virginia; United States

Information
- Type: Private, Classical Christian
- Established: 1996
- Grades: K–12
- Enrollment: 339
- Campus: suburban
- Mascot: Eagles
- Accreditation: Southern Association of Independent Schools
- Website: http://www.dominionschool.com

Dominion Christian School is a private, classical Christian school. It is an accredited member of the Southern Association of Independent Schools. It is also a member of the Association of Classical and Christian Schools (ACCS) and the Society for Classical Learning (SCL). Dominion Christian has campuses in Oakton, and Herndon, Virginia.

In 2021, Niche ranked Dominion Christian School 53 out of 2489 private schools in the United States, making it the fourth best in Virginia.

== History ==
Founded in 1996 as a classical Christian school in Northern Virginia, Dominion’s academic quality was its immediate strength. The school was created as an institution that would promote truth, goodness, and beauty through the liberal arts, combining time-tested classical pedagogy with the latest advancements in math and science. Dominion began as a K-6 school in Oakton, at a facility now referenced as the “South Campus.”

In 2001, the board and administration developed a middle school (grades 7-8) in the same location. With the addition of an upper school (grades 9-12) in 2009, enrollment eventually outgrew the Oakton location. In response, in 2012, Dominion leased a temporary office suite in an office complex in Oakton. By 2013, the middle and upper schools relocated to leased facilities on Isaac Newton Square in Reston, where the school remained for ten years.

In the intervening time, the board and administration continued to search for a permanent home while also developing a vision to enroll two classes per grade. Since neither the Oakton nor the Reston facilities had room to spare, a search commenced for a third location, which was to eventually serve grades K-6. Potomac Baptist Church in Potomac Falls, Virginia was identified, and because of the church’s hospitality, it became a wonderful home for Dominion’s third campus for several years. In 2019, a K-2 Potomac Falls Campus was launched with twelve students. By 2023, after adding one grade level per year, the site had grown to 76 students in grades K-5.

In the decade between 2013 and 2023, Dominion’s overall enrollment doubled. In spite of constant efforts to find a permanent home, suitable facilities for a school of our size and needs were scarce in Northern Virginia. Space became a limiting factor that also made it difficult to add a sixth grade class at Potomac Falls; space also became the school’s greatest strategic need.

Many details came together in 2023 to allow for the purchase of a facility, now called the “North Campus”. With more than 50,000 square feet, 22 classrooms, 14 offices, as well as a gymnasium, library, and large gathering areas, the facility was ideally-suited for Dominion’s needs. It also required relatively few modifications to serve a K-12 school.

Though the facility was not large enough to accommodate all students from Oakton, Potomac Falls, and Reston, it was suitable and in a fitting location for the latter two programs to merge, and it allowed Dominion the space needed in order to fully reach the vision for two sections of every class from K-12 by the 2027-2028 school year (one class each in grades K-6 at the South Campus, one class of K-6 at the North Campus, and two classes of grades 7-12 at the North Campus). The move allowed Dominion to take on a strategic financial partner, Capital Presbyterian Church, which leases the Herndon facility from Dominion.

During the same decade, the leadership team expanded from a head of school and one principal to include an additional North Campus lower school principal, a teaching principal for the middle and upper school, a teaching dean of women, a teaching dean of student activities, a teaching college guidance counselor, a full-time athletic director, a part-time director of admissions, and a part-time director of marketing. Additional teachers and support staff were also added as a means of ensuring continuity of quality in serving a larger student body.

== Education philosophy ==
Dominion Christian School is a part of the Classical Christian education movement in the United States. Its teaching method is based on the Trivium, which is denoted by three stages: Grammar, Dialectic (logic) and Rhetoric. The school's pedagogy draws heavily from the Socratic Method and more so from the Harkness Method.

It teaches its curriculum from a Christian view "that all truth belongs to God".
