= Calvin Tiggle =

American gridiron football player (born 1968)

No. 58, 73
- Position: Linebacker

Personal information
- Born: November 10, 1968 (age 57); Fort Washington, Maryland, U.S.
- Listed height: 6 ft 1 in (1.85 m)
- Listed weight: 235 lb (107 kg)

Career information
- High school: Friendly (Fort Washington)
- College: Georgia Tech
- NFL draft: 1991: 7th round, 174th overall pick

Career history
- Tampa Bay Buccaneers (1991–1992); Toronto Argonauts (1994–1995); Hamilton Tiger-Cats (1996–1999); Toronto Argonauts (2000–2001)

Awards and highlights
- Grey Cup champion (1999); 3× CFL All-Star (1994, 1998, 1999); CFL's Most Outstanding Defensive Player Award (1999); James P. McCaffrey Trophy (1999); National champion (1990); First-team All-ACC (1990)

Career NFL statistics
- Sacks: 1
- Stats at Pro Football Reference

Career CFL statistics
- Games played: 127
- Total tackles: 688
- Sacks: 10
- Interceptions: 9
- Forced fumbles: 5
- Fumble recoveries: 10
- Defensive touchdowns: 3
- Stats at CFL.ca (archived)
- Canadian Football Hall of Fame (Class of 2026)

Calvin Bernard Tiggle (born November 10, 1968) is an American former award-winning linebacker in the Canadian Football League (CFL).

After graduating from the Georgia Institute of Technology (playing with the Georgia Tech Yellow Jackets), he was drafted in the seventh round by and played two seasons (1991 and 1992) with the Tampa Bay Buccaneers of the National Football League (NFL), where in 24 games he recorded one quarterback sack.

He moved to Canada in 1994, playing his first of 4 seasons with the Toronto Argonauts. He was an all star in his first season, setting the team record with 129 tackles. He moved to the Hamilton Tiger-Cats for 4 seasons in 1996, and was an all star in 1998 and 1999, also winning the CFL's Most Outstanding Defensive Player Award in 1999. He finished his career with Toronto in 2000 and 2001, where he was again an all star in 2000. He had the most single game tackles by a Hamilton Tiger-Cat (15).

In 2004, he was issued a departure order to leave Canada after an Immigration Minister's permit to play football expired.

In 2026, he was inducted into the Canadian Football Hall of Fame.
