= Shawn Moore =

American gridiron football player (born 1968)

No. 12, 9
- Position: Quarterback

Personal information
- Born: April 4, 1968 (age 58); Martinsville, Virginia, U.S.
- Listed height: 6 ft 2 in (1.88 m)
- Listed weight: 213 lb (97 kg)

Career information
- High school: Martinsville
- College: Virginia
- NFL draft: 1991: 11th round, 284th overall pick

Career history
- Denver Broncos (1991–1993); Birmingham Fire (1992); Arizona Cardinals (1994)*; Ottawa Rough Riders (1995); Winnipeg Blue Bombers (1995); Calgary Stampeders (1995)
- * Offseason or practice squad member only

Awards and highlights
- First-team All-American (1990); ACC Player of the Year (1990); 2× First-team All-ACC (1989, 1990); Dudley Award (1990); Virginia Cavaliers No. 12 retired

Career NFL statistics
- Passing attempts: 34
- Passing completions: 17
- Completion percentage: 50.0%
- TD–INT: 0–3
- Passing yards: 232
- Passer rating: 35.4
- Stats at Pro Football Reference

Shawn Levique Moore (born April 4, 1968) is an American former professional football player who was a quarterback in the National Football League (NFL) and Canadian Football League (CFL). He played college football for the Virginia Cavaliers and was recognized as a first-team All-American. He later returned to Virginia as an assistant coach under Mike London. Moore was named Director of Community Relations for the College Football Playoff in March 2014.

== College career ==
At the University of Virginia, Moore started at quarterback for the Cavaliers in 1988, as a redshirt sophomore; his college jersey number was "12." Moore led the 1988 team to a 7–4 win–loss record. In 1989, he and the Cavaliers went 10–2 for the regular season, winning a share of the ACC championship. Moore demonstrated the ability not only to throw accurately on both the long and short pass, he had the ability to run the ball effectively. The Cavaliers only losses of the 1989 regular season were to the previous season's NCAA champion, Notre Dame, in the Kickoff Classic, and to Clemson in a game where Moore was injured and never played a down. The Cavaliers shared the ACC title with Duke, despite beating the Blue Devils 49–28, because the ACC had no tie-breaking system at the time. The Citrus Bowl, traditional host of the ACC champion, selected Virginia anyway, pitting the Cavaliers against the University of Illinois and future NFL quarterback Jeff George. The Cavaliers lost 31–21, but Moore was later quoted as saying "I think we knew (we had something special) my junior year, that 1989 season, after we won our first ACC championship. It was a team of veteran players. My class was about 23 strong. Everyone played as a redshirt freshman. We had a lot of playing experience. By the time we were fourth-year juniors, we had a lot of games under our belt. We knew going into that fifth year that we could probably be special." Moore finished the 1989 season ranked fourth in the NCAA in passing efficiency.

=== 1990 season ===
In the 1990 season, Moore and the Cavaliers started off with seven straight wins, including a groundbreaking 20–7 win over the Clemson Tigers, a team that Virginia had not beaten in its previous twenty-nine matches. The offense was prolific, scoring a combined 337 points in its first seven wins, and Moore had a direct hand in scoring more than 50% of the team's touchdowns. For the last three weeks of the seven game streak, the Virginia Cavaliers were ranked #1 in both major polls.

Moore relied on two main targets for his passing game: wide receiver Herman Moore, no relation to Shawn, and tight end Bruce McGonnigal. Despite Herman Moore's reputation as the most dangerous receiver on the field, McGonnigal was known for making clutch catches for first downs. However, in the week before the Georgia Tech game, McGonnigal ruptured his spleen, and a vital part of the passing game was suddenly missing. Georgia Tech prevailed 41–38, despite prolific passing numbers from Moore, including a 63–yard touchdown pass to Herman Moore. Stealing the Cavaliers' momentum, Georgia Tech went on to an undefeated season, a Citrus Bowl win over the Nebraska Cornhuskers, and a share of the national championship with the Colorado Buffaloes.

Already invited to the Sugar Bowl, the Cavaliers attempted to make the best of the season, and managed a 24–10 win over the North Carolina Tar Heels, but against the Maryland, the Cavaliers found themselves in another struggle, with both teams alternating the lead. Late in the game, Moore ran the ball and was tackled short of the Maryland goal line. In the resulting turmoil, a Maryland defender stepped upon the thumb of Moore's throwing hand, forcing it backwards, and dislocating (referred to as a "bad flipper") it for the rest of the season. Without Shawn Moore, the Virginia offense sputtered immediately, and Maryland took the win. The following week, Virginia Tech picked apart Virginia's inexperienced back-up quarterback, Matt Blundin, and the Cavaliers 7–0 start ended in an 8–3 showing.

Moore was brought back for the Sugar Bowl game against the #10 Tennessee Volunteers, and at first his presence kept Tennessee wary and prevented them from stacking the line. Virginia running backs Terry Kirby and Nikki Fisher ran for over 100 yards and Virginia led 16–0 at halftime. But with a few errant long passes in the first half revealing that Moore was not the threat he had been most of the season, Tennessee tightened its defense in the second half, and battled back to win 23–22.

In that 1990 season, Shawn Moore passed for 2262 yards and 21 touchdowns, and rushed for 306 yards and 8 touchdowns. Despite missing the last game of the regular season, Moore still led the NCAA in passing efficiency, even over eventual Heisman Trophy winner, Ty Detmer. He had broken nearly every major record for a quarterback at Virginia. Moore was voted fourth in Heisman balloting, at the time receiving more Heisman votes than any other ACC candidate had previously. His favorite receiver, Herman Moore, placed sixth in the balloting.

== Professional career ==
Moore was drafted in the eleventh round of the 1991 NFL draft by the Denver Broncos with the 284th overall pick. Moore managed to share time at the starting position with Tommy Maddox when John Elway was out for the last six games of the 1992 season. In between seasons with the Broncos he played for the Birmingham Fire of the World League of American Football. After serving as an NFL back-up from 1991 to 1994 with Denver and later the Arizona Cardinals, Moore played for a number of CFL teams, including the Ottawa Rough Riders, Winnipeg Blue Bombers, and the Calgary Stampeders.

== Post-playing career ==
After his career in pro football, Moore pursued administrative jobs with the NCAA, and a brief stint as an XFL scout. He also has worked for the NFL to promote youth football and coached high school football at St. Albans School in Washington, D.C.

On January 8, 2010, it was announced that Moore would return to Virginia as an assistant coach for the Virginia Cavaliers football team. Moore served as an assistant coach at Virginia until 2012.

In March 2014, Moore was named Director of Community Relations for the College Football Playoff.

In April 2021, Moore returned to Virginia as an associate director of development for the athletics department.

== See also ==
- List of NCAA major college football yearly passing leaders
