= William Bell (American football) =

American football player (born 1971)

No. 36
- Position: Running back

Personal information
- Born: July 22, 1971 (age 55); Miami, Florida, U.S.
- Listed height: 5 ft 11 in (1.80 m)
- Listed weight: 214 lb (97 kg)

Career information
- College: Georgia Tech

Career history
- 1994–1996: Washington Redskins

Awards and highlights
- National champion (1990)
- Stats at Pro Football Reference

William Bell (born July 22, 1971) is an American former professional football player who was a running back for the Washington Redskins of the National Football League (NFL). He played college football for the Georgia Tech Yellow Jackets.

== Georgia Tech ==
Bell played at Georgia Tech (1989–1993) and was a member of their 1990 national championship team. Bell was featured on the cover of Sports Illustrated's November 12, 1990 issue. As of the 2010 season, Bell was still 8th all time on the Georgia Tech rushing list with 2,026 yard.
