= Scott Sisson =

American football player (born 1971)

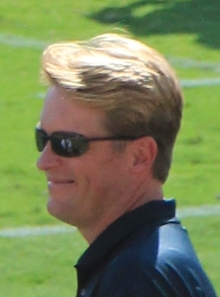
- Sisson in 2012

No. 9
- Position: Placekicker

Personal information
- Born: July 21, 1971 (age 55); New Orleans, Louisiana, U.S.
- Listed height: 6 ft 0 in (1.83 m)
- Listed weight: 197 lb (89 kg)

Career information
- High school: Marietta (Marietta, Georgia)
- College: Georgia Tech
- NFL draft: 1993: 5th round, 113th overall pick

Career history
- New England Patriots (1993); Tampa Bay Buccaneers (1994)*; Jacksonville Jaguars (1995)*; Minnesota Vikings (1996)
- * Offseason or practice squad member only

Awards and highlights
- National champion (1990); First-team All-American (1992); First-team All-ACC (1992); Georgia Tech Hall of Fame (2003)

Career NFL statistics
- Field goals made: 36
- Field goals attempted: 55
- Field goal %: 65.5
- Extra points: 45/45
- PAT %: 100
- Stats at Pro Football Reference

Scott O'Neal Sisson (born July 21, 1971) is an American former professional football player who was a placekicker in the National Football League (NFL) for the New England Patriots (1993) and the Minnesota Vikings (1996). He played college football for the Georgia Tech Yellow Jackets, winning the 1990 national championship and earning first-team All-American honors in 1992. He was inducted into the Georgia Tech Hall of Fame in 2003.

== College career ==
Scott Sisson's most notable kick as a college football player was a field goal which secured Georgia Tech's win over previously #1 ranked Virginia during the UVA homecoming game on November 3, 1990. The win resulted in wild partying on the Georgia Tech campus including spontaneous bonfires, and set the stage for Georgia Tech's #1 ranking as national champions in that season's final UPI poll (with the AP poll going to Colorado), turning Sisson into a campus hero. Georgia Tech was undefeated that year, having previously tied North Carolina, in contrast to the AP's #1 pick of Colorado which had lost one game that season. Georgia Tech's victory over UVA and Sisson's success on the field brought extra attention to Georgia Tech special teams.

=== Records ===
Sisson set a school record of 70 consecutive extra points during his college football career that was passed by Luke Manget during the 2000 football season. Sisson also set a school scoring record for kickers during 1990 football season with 84 points which was also passed by Luke Manget during the 1999 football season. Manget passed this record with 11 field goals and 53 extra points in 1999, vs. Sisson's 15 field goals and 39 extra points in 1990. Sisson set a record of most field goals made in a season with 19 during 1992 football season, which was matched by Luke Manget during 2001 football season. Sisson also set a school record for most career field goals with 60.

=== Statistics ===
	PAT			FG			TOTAL
YEAR	XPOINTS	ATTEMPTS	COMP %	FGOALS	ATTEMPTS	COMP %	POINTS
1989	30	30	100%	15	24	62.5%	75
1990	39	39	100%	15	23	65.2%	84
1991	30	31	96.8%	11	17	64.7%	63
1992	20	21	95.2%	19	24	79.2%	77
TOTAL	119	121	98.3%	60	88	68.2%	299

== Professional career ==
Sisson was drafted in the fifth round of the 1993 NFL Draft by the Patriots. During his one-year tenure with the Patriots, Sisson had a 53.8% kicking percentage. Patriots fans gave him the name "missin' Sisson" Sisson achieved a 75.9% field goal percentage with the Minnesota Vikings, improving his NFL career average to 65.5%.

== See also ==
- Toe meets leather
