= Shawn Jones (gridiron football) =

American gridiron football player (born 1970)

No. 10
- Position: Quarterback

Personal information
- Born: June 16, 1970 (age 56); Thomasville, Georgia, U.S.
- Listed height: 6 ft 1 in (1.85 m)
- Listed weight: 200 lb (91 kg)

Career information
- College: Georgia Tech (1989-92)

Career history
- Minnesota Vikings (1993); Baltimore Stallions (1994-95)

Awards and highlights
- National champion (1990); Citrus Bowl MVP (1991)
- Stats at Pro Football Reference

Andrew Shawn Jones (born June 16, 1970) is an American former gridiron football player. He played professionally for the Minnesota Vikings in the National Football League (NFL) as well as the Baltimore Stallions in the Canadian Football League (CFL). Jones was a four-year starter at quarterback for the Georgia Tech Yellow Jackets.

== High school ==
Jones played high school football for the Thomasville High School Bulldogs as a quarterback.

== College ==
Jones is one of the greatest Georgia Tech Yellow Jackets quarterbacks, leading his team to the 1990 UPI National Championship, and amassing 35 wins, 9,296 yards of total offense, and 70 touchdowns over 4 years of collegiate play. In all of Georgia Tech football history, only Jones and three other quarterbacks started all four years of their collegiate careers.

=== 1990 National Championship/1991 Citrus Bowl ===
Jones led the Yellow Jackets to a Division I-A best 11-0-1 Record in 1990 capped off with a 45-21 Citrus Bowl victory over Nebraska. Jones would be named the Bowl MVP. Led by Jones, Georgia Tech finished #1 in the Coaches Poll and was the only undefeated team of the 1990 season and would share the title with Colorado who finished #1 in the AP Poll.

== Professional career ==
After college, Shawn went into the NFL as an undrafted safety. He played one game for the Minnesota Vikings in 1993.

He found a quarterback position from 1994 to 1995 for the short-lived Baltimore Stallions, an American expansion team in the Canadian Football League. He would back up former Georgia Southern quarterback Tracy Ham as the Stallions became the only American expansion team to ever win the Grey Cup.

== Records/Accomplishments ==
- Georgia Tech Athletics Hall of Fame (2003)
- Citrus Bowl MVP (1991)
- Georgia Tech-3rd All-Time Career Total Offense Leaders 9,296 yards
- Georgia Tech-2nd All-Time Career Passing Leaders 8,441 yards

== See also ==
- List of Georgia Tech Yellow Jackets starting quarterbacks
- Georgia Tech Yellow Jackets football statistical leaders
