= 1986 All-Pacific-10 Conference football team =

1986 Pacific-10 Conference football standings
	Conf.					Overall
Team	W		L		T	W		L		T
No. 4 Arizona State $	5	–	1	–	1	10	–	1	–	1
No. 14 UCLA	5	–	2	–	1	8	–	3	–	1
No. 18 Washington	5	–	2	–	1	8	–	3	–	1
No. 11 Arizona	5	–	3	–	0	9	–	3	–	0
Stanford	5	–	3	–	0	8	–	4	–	0
USC	5	–	3	–	0	7	–	5	–	0
Oregon	3	–	5	–	0	5	–	6	–	0
Washington State	2	–	6	–	1	3	–	7	–	1
California	2	–	7	–	0	2	–	9	–	0
Oregon State	1	–	6	–	0	3	–	8	–	0
$ – Conference champion; Rankings from AP Poll

The 1986 All-Pacific-10 Conference football team consists of American football players chosen by various organizations for All-Pacific-10 Conference teams for the 1986 college football season.

== Offensive selections ==
=== Quarterback ===
- Chris Miller, Oregon (Coaches-1)
- John Paye, Stanford (Coaches-2)

=== Running backs ===
- Brad Muster, Stanford (Coaches-1)
- Gaston Green, UCLA (Coaches-1)
- David Adams, Arizona (Coaches-1)
- Kerry Porter, Washington State (Coaches-2)
- Darryl Harris, Arizona State (Coaches-2)
- Channing Williams, Arizona State (Coaches-2)

=== Wide receivers ===
- Lonzell Hill, Washington (Coaches-1)
- Aaron Cox, Arizona State (Coaches-1)
- Ken Henry, USC (Coaches-2)
- Jeff James, Stanford (Coaches-2)

=== Tight end ===
- Rod Jones, Washington (Coaches-1)
- Jeff Gallimore, Arizona State (Coaches-2)

=== Tackles ===
- Danny Villa, Arizona State (Coaches-1)
- Dave Cadigan, USC (Coaches-2)
- Kevin Gogan, Washington (Coaches-2)

=== Guards ===
- Jeff Bregel, USC (Coaches-1)
- Randall McDaniel, Arizona State (Coaches-1)
- Jeff Tofflemire, Arizona (Coaches-1)
- Dave Orndorff, Oregon State (Coaches-2)

=== Center ===
- Mike Zandofsky, Washington (Coaches-1)
- Joe Goebel, UCLA (Coaches-2)
- Andy Sinclair, Stanford (Coaches-2)

== Defensive selections ==
=== Linemen ===
- Reggie Rogers, Washington (Coaches-1)
- Skip McClendon, Arizona State (Coaches-1)
- Terry Tumey, UCLA (Coaches-1)
- Tony Leiker, Stanford (Coaches-1)
- Stan Mataele, Arizona (Coaches-2)
- Gino Mingo, Oregon State (Coaches-2)
- Paul Carberry, Oregon State (Coaches-2)
- Majett Whiteside, California (Coaches-2)

=== Linebackers ===
- Byron Evans, Arizona (Coaches-1)
- Marcus Cotton, USC (Coaches-1)
- Scott Stephen, Arizona State (Coaches-1)
- Dave Wyman, Stanford (Coaches-1)
- Ken Norton Jr., UCLA (Coaches-2)
- Hardy Nickerson, California (Coaches-2)
- David Rill, Washington (Coaches-2)
- Danny Lockett, Arizona (Coaches-2)

=== Defensive backs ===
- Tim McDonald, USC (Coaches-1)
- Chuck Cecil, Arizona (Coaches-1)
- Craig Rutledge, UCLA (Coaches-1)
- Tim Peoples, Washington (Coaches-1)
- Toi Cook, Stanford (Coaches-2)
- Lou Brock Jr., USC (Coaches-2)
- Darren Willis, Arizona State (Coaches-2)
- Walt Harris, Stanford (Coaches-2)

== Special teams ==
=== Placekicker ===
- Jeff Jaeger, Washington (Coaches-1)
- Gary Coston, Arizona (Coaches-2)

=== Punter ===
- Mike Preacher, Oregon (Coaches-1)

=== Return specialist ===
- Thomas Henley, Stanford (Coaches-1)

== Key ==
Coaches = Pacific-10 head football coaches

== See also ==
- 1986 College Football All-America Team
