= 1987 Rose Bowl =

American college football game

- 73rd Rose Bowl Game
Michigan Wolverines	Arizona State Sun Devils
(11–1)	(9–1–1)
15	22
Head coach: Bo Schembechler	Head coach: John Cooper
AP / Coaches; 4 / 4	AP / Coaches; 7 / 8
	1	2	3	4	Total
Michigan	8	7	0	0	15
Arizona State	0	13	6	3	22
- Date: January 1, 1987
- Season: 1986
- Stadium: Rose Bowl
- Location: Pasadena, California
- MVP: Jeff Van Raaphorst (QB, ASU)
- Favorite: Michigan by 2½ points
- National anthem: Michigan Marching Band
- Referee: Larry Thompson (Pac-10); split crew: Pac-10, Big Ten)
- Halftime show: Michigan Marching Band, Arizona State Sun Devil Marching Band
- Attendance: 103,168

United States TV coverage
- Network: NBC
- Announcers: Dick Enberg, Merlin Olsen

The 1987 Rose Bowl was a college football bowl game played on January 1, 1987, at the Rose Bowl in Pasadena, California. It was the 73rd Rose Bowl Game. The Arizona State Sun Devils, champions of the Pacific-10 Conference, defeated the Michigan Wolverines, champions of the Big Ten Conference, 22–15.

Arizona State quarterback Jeff Van Raaphorst was named the Player of the Game. In their ninth season in the Pac-10, this was the first appearance for Arizona State in the Rose Bowl.

This was the sixth consecutive Rose Bowl win for the Pac-10, with twelve wins in the last thirteen.

== Teams ==
=== Arizona State Sun Devils ===
Arizona State quarterback Jeff Van Raaphorst looked uncomfortable in the first two games of the season, wins over Michigan State and SMU. He threw five interceptions in the third game of year against Washington State, which ended in a 21–21 tie. A 16–9 win for Arizona State over UCLA in Pasadena on October 4 later proved to be the deciding game in the race for the Pac-10 Conference title. The Sun Devils then defeated Oregon in Eugene and returned to Southern California to defeat USC at the Los Angeles Memorial Coliseum, becoming the first Pac-10 team to beat both Los Angeles area conference members on their home turf.

With three straight wins at home over former WAC nemesis Utah, Washington, and Cal, combined with a UCLA loss to Stanford, Arizona State clinched the Pac-10 title and a Rose Bowl berth on November 8. The Sun Devils dropped their final game of the regular season to in-state rival Arizona, 34-17, in the annual battle for the Territorial Cup.

=== Michigan Wolverines ===
The Michigan Wolverines began the 1986 season ranked third in the nation. They opened their schedule with a close 24–23 win over Notre Dame in South Bend. Then they won their home opener, 31–12, over Oregon State and beat an up-and-coming Florida State squad ranked #20, 20-18. The Wolverines then handily defeated Wisconsin and Michigan State to begin Big Ten play. Michigan then faced #8 ranked Iowa. A #1 versus #2 matchup the previous season between the two schools, which the Wolverines lost, had decided the race for the Big Ten title and the 1986 Rose Bowl. Michigan won the 1986 showdown, 20–17, and then rolled over Illinois, Indiana, and Purdue to improve their record to 9–0 and ascend to #2 in the rankings.

Michigan's next opponent, Minnesota, had not beaten the Wolverines since 1977 and came into Ann Arbor as a 25-point underdog. A Michigan touchdown tied the game at 17–17 with just two minutes to go, but Golden Gopher quarterback Rickey Foggie scrambled to put Chip Lohmiller in position to kick the winning field goal. Minnesota prevailed, 20–17, for their first win at Michigan since 1962.

The loss dropped the Wolverines to sixth as they prepared to face their archrival, seventh-ranked Ohio State, for a trip to the Rose Bowl. Jim Harbaugh guaranteed a Michigan victory. "We don't care where we play the game," said the senior quarterback early in the week. "I hate to say it, but we could play it in the parking lot. We could play the game at 12 noon or midnight. We're going to be jacked up." With Arizona State having already locked up a Rose Bowl berth, and the Fiesta Bowl and Citrus Bowl scrambling to host a #1 versus #2 showdown between Miami and Penn State, the Cotton Bowl struck an agreement to take the loser of the Michigan–Ohio State game. Michigan running back Jamie Morris led the Wolverines to a 26–24 victory on the strength of his record-setting 216 yards rushing, subsequently broken by Tim Biakabutuka's 313 yards against OSU in 1995. The Wolverines were Pasadena-bound.

== Game summary ==
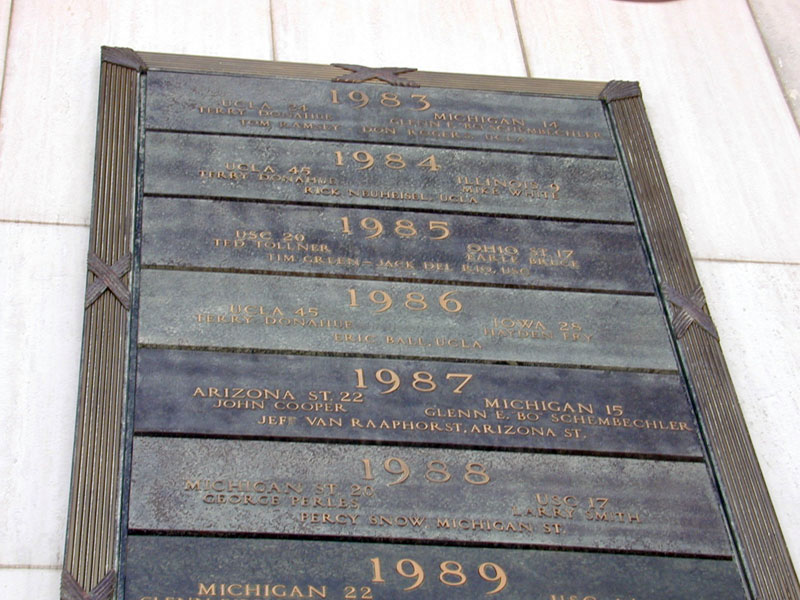
Rose Bowl records at the Hall of Champions

=== Scoring summary ===
==== First quarter ====
- Michigan – Jamie Morris, 18-yard run (Gerald White pass from Mike Gillette)

==== Second quarter ====
- ASU – Kent Bostrom, 37-yard field goal
- Michigan – Jim Harbaugh, 2-yard run (Gillette kick)
- ASU – Bostrom, 27-yard field goal
- ASU – Bruce Hill, 4-yard pass from Jeff Van Raaphorst (Bostrom kick)

==== Third quarter ====
- ASU – Hill, 1-yard pass from Van Raaphorst (Van Raaphorst pass failed)

==== Fourth quarter ====
- ASU – Bostrom, 25-yard field goal
