= 1986 Arizona State Sun Devils football team =

American college football season

1986 Arizona State Sun Devils football

Pac-10 champion Rose Bowl champion

Rose Bowl, W 22–15 vs. Michigan
- Conference: Pacific-10 Conference

Ranking
- Coaches: No. 5
- AP: No. 4
- Record: 10–1–1 (5–1–1 Pac-10)
- Head coach: John Cooper (2nd season)
- Offensive coordinator: Jim Colletto (2nd season)
- Defensive coordinator: Larry Marmie (2nd season)
- Home stadium: Sun Devil Stadium

1986 Pacific-10 Conference football standings
	Conf.					Overall
Team	W		L		T	W		L		T
No. 4 Arizona State $	5	–	1	–	1	10	–	1	–	1
No. 14 UCLA	5	–	2	–	1	8	–	3	–	1
No. 18 Washington	5	–	2	–	1	8	–	3	–	1
No. 11 Arizona	5	–	3	–	0	9	–	3	–	0
Stanford	5	–	3	–	0	8	–	4	–	0
USC	5	–	3	–	0	7	–	5	–	0
Oregon	3	–	5	–	0	5	–	6	–	0
Washington State	2	–	6	–	1	3	–	7	–	1
California	2	–	7	–	0	2	–	9	–	0
Oregon State	1	–	6	–	0	3	–	8	–	0
$ – Conference champion; Rankings from AP Poll

The 1986 Arizona State Sun Devils football team represented Arizona State University as a member of Pacific-10 Conference (Pac-10) during the 1986 NCAA Division I-A football season. Led by second-year head coach John Cooper, the Sun Devils compiled an overall record of 10–1–1 with a mark of 5–1–1 in conference play, winning the Pac-10 title.

Arizona State quarterback Jeff Van Raaphorst looked uncomfortable in the first two games of the season, wins over Michigan State and SMU. He threw five interceptions in the third game of year against Washington State, which ended in a 21–21 tie. A 16–9 win for Arizona State over UCLA in Pasadena on October 4 later proved to be the deciding game in the race for the Pac-10 Conference title. The Sun Devils then defeated Oregon in Eugene and returned to Southern California to defeat USC at the Los Angeles Memorial Coliseum, becoming the first Pac-10 team to beat both Los Angeles area conference members on their home turf.

With three straight wins at home over former Western Athletic Conference (WAC) nemesis Utah, Washington, and Cal, combined with a UCLA loss to Stanford, Arizona State clinched the Pac-10 title and a Rose Bowl berth on November 8. The Sun Devils dropped their final game of the regular season to in-state rival Arizona, 34–17, in the annual Territorial Cup. The Sun Devils then defeated Michigan, 22–15, on January 1, 1987, in their first Rose Bowl.

== Schedule ==
Date	Time	Opponent	Rank	Site	TV	Result	Attendance	Source
September 13	7:30 pm	No. 20 Michigan State*		Sun Devil Stadium; Tempe, AZ	WTBS	W 20–17	70,689	
September 20	7:30 pm	SMU*	No. 18	Sun Devil Stadium; Tempe, AZ		W 30–0	70,511	
September 27	7:30 pm	Washington State	No. 11	Sun Devil Stadium; Tempe, AZ		T 21–21	70,543	
October 4	11:30 am	at No. 15 UCLA	No. 16	Rose Bowl; Pasadena, CA	CBS	W 16–9	51,533	
October 11	1:00 pm	at Oregon	No. 15	Autzen Stadium; Eugene, OR		W 37–17	28,522	
October 18	1:30 pm	at No. 15 USC	No. 10	Los Angeles Memorial Coliseum; Los Angeles, CA		W 29–20	65,874	
October 25	7:30 pm	Utah*	No. 9	Sun Devil Stadium; Tempe, AZ		W 52–7	67,130	
November 1	7:30 pm	No. 6 Washington	No. 7	Sun Devil Stadium; Tempe, AZ	KTVK	W 34–21	71,589	
November 8	5:00 pm	California	No. 5	Sun Devil Stadium; Tempe, AZ	WTBS	W 49–0	70,239	
November 15	7:30 pm	Wichita State*	No. 5	Sun Devil Stadium; Tempe, AZ		W 52–6	65,333	
November 22	1:30 pm	at No. 14 Arizona	No. 4	Arizona Stadium; Tucson, AZ (rivalry)	CBS	L 17–34	58,267	
January 1	3:00 pm	vs. No. 4 Michigan*	No. 7	Rose Bowl; Pasadena, CA (Rose Bowl)	NBC	W 22–15	103,168	
*Non-conference game; Rankings from AP Poll released prior to the game; All times are in Mountain time

== Rankings ==
Ranking movements Legend: ██ Increase in ranking ██ Decrease in ranking — = Not ranked ( ) = First-place votes
	Week														
Poll	Pre	1	2	3	4	5	6	7	8	9	10	11	12	13	Final
AP	—	—	18	11	16	15	10	9	7	5	5 (1)	4 (1)	8	7	4
Coaches	—	—	17	11	14	13	10	9	7	5	5	4	8	8	5

== Game summaries ==
=== At Arizona ===
#4 Arizona State Sun Devils (9–0–1) at #14 Arizona Wildcats (7–2)

Quarter	1	2	3	4	Total
Arizona St	0	10	0	7	17
Arizona	7	7	7	13	34

at Arizona Stadium • Tucson, Arizona

- Date: November 22
- Game attendance: 58,267
- TV announcers (CBS): Verne Lundquist

Game information

Arizona St

- Jeff Van Raaphorst
  38/55, 437 Yds, 2 TD, 3 INT
- Darryl Harris
  16 Rush, 55 Yds
- Aaron Cox
  10 Rec, 191 Yds, TD

Arizona

- Alfred Jenkins
  11/17, 165 Yds, TD
- David Adams
  18 Rush, 91 Yds
- Derek Hill
  2 Rec, 67 Yds

Scoring summary

Quarter	Time	Drive			Team	Scoring information	Score	
Quarter	Time	Plays	Yards	TOP	Team	Scoring information	ASU	ARI
1	7:14	6	97		Arizona	Adams 18-yard touchdown reception from Jenkins, Coston kick good	0	7
2	13:31				Arizona	Greathouse 5-yard touchdown run, Coston kick good	0	14
2	7:59				Arizona St	Garrett 7-yard touchdown reception from Van Raaphorst, Bostrom kick good	7	14
2	0:00				Arizona St	21-yard field goal by Bostrom	10	14
3	11:55				Arizona	McLemore 6-yard touchdown run, Coston kick good	10	21
4	12:56				Arizona	28-yard field goal by Coston	10	24
4	8:56				Arizona	Interception returned 100 yards for touchdown by Cecil, Coston kick good	10	31
4	6:47				Arizona St	Cox 20-yard touchdown reception from Van Raaphorst, Bostrom kick good	17	31
4	2:14				Arizona	27-yard field goal by Coston	17	34
"TOP" = time of possession. For other American football terms, see Glossary of American football.							17	34

=== Vs. Michigan (Rose Bowl) ===
#4 Michigan vs. #7 Arizona State

Team	1	2	3	4	Total
Wolverines	8	7	0	0	15
• Sun Devils	0	13	6	3	22

- Date: January 1
- Location: Rose Bowl, Pasadena, CA
- Game attendance: 103,168

== Personnel ==
1986 Arizona State Sun Devils football team roster
Players
Coaches
Offense

Pos.	#	Name	Class
TE		Robert Arcoraci
WR	84	Aaron Cox	Jr
WR		Paul Day
QB	7	Daniel Ford	So
TE		Jeff Gallimore
WR	85	Chris Garrett	So
RB	12	Darryl Harris	Jr
WR		Bruce Hill
WR		Tony Johnson
OL	65	Todd Kalis	Jr
OL		Scott Kirby
TE		Stein Koss
G	62	Randall McDaniel	Jr
RB		Mike Skala
OL		Kevin Thomas
RB		Darin Tupper
QB	10	Jeff Van Raaphorst	Sr
OL		Danny Villa
OL		Jim Warne	Sr
RB		Kirk Wendorf
FB		Channing Williams

Defense

Pos.	#	Name	Class
DB	25	Eric Allen	Jr
DL	93	Trace Armstrong	Jr
DB	26	Robby Boyd	So
LB	36	Greg Clark	Jr
LB		Stacy Harvey
DB		Jeff Joseph
DL		Skip McClendon
DL		Larry McGlothen
DB		Anthony Parker
DL	97	Shawn Patterson	Jr
DL		Jim Reynosa
DL		Frank Rudolph
DL		Dan Saleaumua
LB		Scott Stephen
DB		Darren Willis

Special teams

Pos.	#	Name	Class
K		Kent Bostrom
P	6	Mike Schuh	So

Head coach

- John Cooper

Coordinators/assistant coaches

- Tim Salem
  (Graduate assistant)

Legend

- (C) Team captain
- (S) Suspended
- (I) Ineligible
- Injured
- Redshirt
