= 1986 Arizona Wildcats football team =

American college football season

1986 Arizona Wildcats football

Aloha Bowl champion

Aloha Bowl, W 30–21 vs. North Carolina
- Conference: Pacific-10 Conference

Ranking
- Coaches: No. 10
- AP: No. 11
- Record: 9–3 (5–3 Pac-10)
- Head coach: Larry Smith (7th season)
- Offensive coordinator: Chuck Stobart (1st season)
- Defensive coordinator: Chris Allen
- Captain: Byron Evans
- Home stadium: Arizona Stadium

1986 Pacific-10 Conference football standings
	Conf.					Overall
Team	W		L		T	W		L		T
No. 4 Arizona State $	5	–	1	–	1	10	–	1	–	1
No. 14 UCLA	5	–	2	–	1	8	–	3	–	1
No. 18 Washington	5	–	2	–	1	8	–	3	–	1
No. 11 Arizona	5	–	3	–	0	9	–	3	–	0
Stanford	5	–	3	–	0	8	–	4	–	0
USC	5	–	3	–	0	7	–	5	–	0
Oregon	3	–	5	–	0	5	–	6	–	0
Washington State	2	–	6	–	1	3	–	7	–	1
California	2	–	7	–	0	2	–	9	–	0
Oregon State	1	–	6	–	0	3	–	8	–	0
$ – Conference champion; Rankings from AP Poll

The 1986 Arizona Wildcats football team represented the University of Arizona during the 1986 NCAA Division I-A football season. They were coached by Larry Smith in his seventh and final season. The Wildcats ended the season with a 9–3 record (5–3 in Pac-10) and won the Aloha Bowl against North Carolina for their first bowl win ever.

The season was best known for a 34–17 upset victory over rival Arizona State in the regular season finale that denied ASU an unbeaten season and chance at a potential national championship. The game also was known for Arizona returning an interception for touchdown that broke the game open.

After the season, Smith was hired by Pac-10 foe USC as the head coach (see below). He was replaced by Hawaii coach Dick Tomey, who had a successful tenure with the Wildcats.

== Before the season ==
Arizona finished the 1985 season with a record of 8–3–1 (5–2 in Pac-10) and tied with Georgia in the Sun Bowl. The team entered 1986 with high expectations, and had their live television ban lifted following sanctions against them from 1983. They were also eligible to be placed in the poll rankings in the season. In addition, the Wildcats began the year in contention for the Pac-10 title and Rose Bowl.

== Schedule ==
Date	Time	Opponent	Rank	Site	TV	Result	Attendance	Source
September 6	7:00 p.m.	Houston*		Arizona Stadium; Tucson, AZ	KMSB	W 37–3	52,433	
September 13	7:00 p.m.	Colorado State*		Arizona Stadium; Tucson, AZ	KMSB	W 37–10	49,003	
September 20	1:00 p.m.	at Oregon	No. 17	Autzen Stadium; Eugene, OR	Prime	W 41–17	28,773	
September 27	7:00 p.m.	at Colorado*	No. 10	Folsom Field; Boulder, CO	Raycom/KMSB	W 24–21	41,024	
October 11	1:00 p.m.	at UCLA	No. 11	Rose Bowl; Pasadena, CA	CBS	L 25–32	51,279	
October 18	7:00 p.m.	Oregon State	No. 16	Arizona Stadium; Tucson, AZ	KMSB	W 23–12	52,669	
October 25	7:00 p.m.	California	No. 15	Arizona Stadium; Tucson, AZ	KMSB	W 33–16	49,016	
November 1	5:30 p.m.	No. 18 USC^{†}	No. 14	Arizona Stadium; Tucson, AZ	Prime	L 13–20	55,046	
November 8	5:00 p.m.	at Washington State	No. 17	Martin Stadium; Pullman, WA	Prime	W 31–6	17,000	
November 22	1:30 p.m.	No. 4 Arizona State	No. 14	Arizona Stadium; Tucson, AZ (rivalry)	CBS	W 34–17	58,267	
November 30	8:00 p.m.	vs. Stanford	No. 12	National Stadium; Tokyo, Japan (Coca-Cola Classic)	ESPN	L 24–29	55,000	
December 27	3:30 p.m.	vs. North Carolina*	No. 16	Aloha Stadium; Halawa, HI (Aloha Bowl)	ABC	W 30–21	26,743	
*Non-conference game; ^{†}Homecoming; Rankings from AP Poll released prior to the game

== Rankings ==
Ranking movements Legend: ██ Increase in ranking ██ Decrease in ranking — = Not ranked
	Week														
Poll	Pre	1	2	3	4	5	6	7	8	9	10	11	12	13	Final
AP	—	—	17	10	10	11	16	15	14	17	14	14	12	16	11
Coaches	—	16	15	10	10	9	14	15	14	17	13	15	11	13	10

== Game summaries ==
=== Oregon ===
The Wildcats went on the road to face Oregon and was ranked 17th, which was the first time since 1983 that they were officially ranked in the polls. The Arizona offense would become too much for the Ducks and remain unbeaten.

=== UCLA ===
Undefeated and eleventh-ranked Arizona visited UCLA at the Rose Bowl. The Wildcats led 18-0 earlier in the game and seemed like they would stay unbeaten before the Bruins bounced back to grab the lead before Arizona regained it the fourth quarter. With over a minute remaining, UCLA drove into Arizona territory and scored to retake the lead for good to hand the Wildcats their first loss of the season.

=== USC ===
On homecoming day, the Wildcats hosted USC in a top-20 matchup. Although the Wildcats (ranked 14th) would hang tough with the Trojans (18th), their offense didn’t do enough and committed several turnovers, leading to a loss. Smith would become USC's coach after the season (see below).

=== Arizona State ===
#4 Arizona State Sun Devils (9–0–1) at #14 Arizona Wildcats (7–2)

Quarter	1	2	3	4	Total
Arizona State	0	10	0	7	17
Arizona	7	7	7	13	34

at Arizona Stadium • Tucson, Arizona

- Date: November 22
- Game attendance: 58,267
- TV announcers (CBS): Verne Lundquist

Game information

Arizona State

- Jeff Van Raaphorst
  38/55, 437 Yds, 2 TD, 3 INT
- Darryl Harris
  16 Rush, 55 Yds
- Aaron Cox
  10 Rec, 191 Yds, TD

Arizona

- Alfred Jenkins
  11/17, 165 Yds, TD
- David Adams
  18 Rush, 91 Yds
- Derek Hill
  2 Rec, 67 Yds

Scoring summary

Quarter	Time	Drive			Team	Scoring information	Score	
Quarter	Time	Plays	Yards	TOP	Team	Scoring information	ASU	ARIZ
1	7:14	6	97		Arizona	Adams 18-yard touchdown reception from Jenkins, Coston kick good	0	7
2	13:31				Arizona	Greathouse 5-yard touchdown run, Coston kick good	0	14
2	7:59				Arizona State	Garrett 7-yard touchdown reception from Van Raaphorst, Bostrom kick good	7	14
2	0:00				Arizona State	21-yard field goal by Bostrom	10	14
3	11:55				Arizona	McLemore 6-yard touchdown run, Coston kick good	10	21
4	12:56				Arizona	28-yard field goal by Coston	10	24
4	8:56				Arizona	Interception returned 100 yards for touchdown by Cecil, Coston kick good	10	31
4	6:47				Arizona State	Cox 20-yard touchdown reception from Van Raaphorst, Bostrom kick good	17	31
4	2:14				Arizona	27-yard field goal by Coston	17	34
"TOP" = time of possession. For other American football terms, see Glossary of American football.							17	34

In the regular season finale, Arizona hosted fourth-ranked and unbeaten Arizona State in the annual rivalry game. Entering the game, Arizona State had already clinched both the Pac-10 title and Rose Bowl berth. The Wildcats’ offense got off to a good start early and their defense shut down the Sun Devils’ offense for most of the game, including a goal-line stand in the third quarter.

The turning point of the game occurred in the fourth quarter when ASU, down 24–10, threatened by driving down the field and cutting into Arizona's lead. However, the Wildcat defense came up big again by forcing ASU quarterback Jeff Van Raaphorst to throw an interception in the end zone, with Arizona safety Chuck Cecil returning it back the other way down the sideline for a 100-yard touchdown to give Arizona a 31–10 lead that sent Arizona Stadium (and Tucson) into a frenzy and shocking almost everybody in the state of Arizona. The play led to Arizona grabbing momentum and ASU would not recover from it for the rest of the game and the Wildcats went on to win by a score of 34-17 and gave the Sun Devils their first and only loss of the season and ended ASU's chances for a possible national championship. It was also Arizona’s fifth straight victory over ASU, which was their longest winning streak in the rivalry since they won 11 in a row from 1932 to 1948.

In a postgame interview after the game, Smith remarked that the Wildcats were the “big brother” team in the state due to Arizona’s dominance against ASU at the time (a reference to when he called the team “ASU’s little brother” after a loss in 1981). He also said that Arizona was the state’s “NFL team” due to their performance (also echoing the remarks that he said after losing to ASU in his first season in 1980.

Arizona fans often declare Cecil's pick-six as the greatest moment in Wildcat football history and not just in the UA–ASU rivalry.

=== Stanford ===
Riding high on the momentum after its big victory over Arizona State, the Wildcats traveled out of the country to play Stanford in Tokyo in a special matchup. The Cardinal would narrowly get past Arizona, ending the regular season. This was the first and so far, only time in Wildcat history that the team played a game outside of the United States.

=== North Carolina (Aloha Bowl) ===
In the Aloha Bowl in Hawaii, Arizona faced North Carolina (whom, like Arizona, are best known for their prestigious men's basketball programs). The Wildcats played hard and defeated the Tar Heels to win their first-ever bowl game in program history (the Wildcats had been winless their previous bowl appearances, including a tie in the previous year). It turned out to be Smith's final game as Arizona's coach.

== Personnel ==
1986 Arizona Wildcats football team roster
Players
Coaches
Offense

Pos.	#	Name	Class
RB	2	David Adams	Sr
OL		Frank Arriola
QB	4	Craig Bergman
OL	50	Val Bichekas
QB		Andy Crouch
OL		Brian Denton
WR		Jeff Fairholm
RB	40	Art Greathouse	Fr
TE		Jim Hanawalt
WR	82	Derek Hill	So
WR		Jon Horton
QB	1	Alfred Jenkins	Sr
RB		Chuck Knox
TE		Kip Lewis
TE		Vince Lotti
RB	20	Chris McLemore	Sr
WR		Branch McNeal
RB		Joe Prior
OL		Jeff Rinehart
C	52	Joe Tofflemire	So
OL		Hugh Verbalatis
WR		Jeff Vickers
RB		Chuck Webb

Defense

Pos.	#	Name	Class
LB		Jerry Beasley
DL		Jim Birmingham
S	6	Chuck Cecil	Jr
DB		Troy Cephers
DB	38	James DeBow	So
LB		Byron Evans (C)	Sr
DL		Reggie Gaddis
LB		Francis Gibson
DB		Eugene Hardy
DT	97	George Hinkle	Jr
DB		Durrell Jones
DB		Randy Kindred
LB		Dan Lockett
DL		Stan Mataele
CB	27	Martin Rudolph	Sr
LB		Chris Singleton
LB		Kevin Singleton
DL	37	Dana Wells	So
LB	35	Brent Wood

Special teams

Pos.	#	Name	Class
K	11	Gary Coston	Fr
P	8	Ruben Rodriguez	Sr

Head coach

- Larry Smith

Coordinators/assistant coaches

- Chris Allen (DC)
- Chuck Stobart (OC)
- Tom Roggeman (LB)

Legend

- (C) Team captain
- (S) Suspended
- (I) Ineligible
- Injured
- Redshirt

== Awards and honors ==
- Byron Evans, LB, Pac-10 defensive player of the year

== Season notes ==
- This was the first season in which the Wildcats won in the postseason.
- Arizona Stadium used a new logo at midfield, which featured a large red “A” with the words “Bear Down” (with “Bear” on the top of the “A” and “Down” on the bottom of it). “Bear Down” is the Wildcats’ motto. The logo would be used until the end of the 1988 season.
- All three of Arizona's losses were by seven points or less. The team lost by a combined 19 points and came within at least 20 of finishing with a perfect season record.
- The win over Houston was Arizona's first win over the Cougars. The two teams would not play each other again until 2017–18, with Houston winning in both years. The two met again in 2024, with the Wildcats winning.
- Arizona and Colorado would play each other again until 2011, when Colorado joined the Pac-10 (which was renamed the Pac-12).
- After this season, Arizona would not defeat Oregon on the road again until 2006.
- Had the Wildcats defeated UCLA and got past either USC or Stanford, they would have finished first in the Pac-10 and made it to their first Rose Bowl and Smith would have likely remained Arizona's coach from 1987 onwards.
- Arizona's win over Arizona State featured an interception return for a touchdown that officially went 100 yards by the NCAA. Wildcat fans would often refer to the play as “The Interception”, “The Interception Return”, or “The Pick-Six”, and would be known as the greatest moment for the football program. In addition, the play would often play on the Arizona Stadium scoreboard during pregame in later years.
- The Wildcats won nine games in a season for the first time since 1975 and it was the most under Smith. Arizona's win total increased each year with Smith, as he rebuilt the program during most of the early-to-mid 1980s. The team won five in 1980, six in 1981–82, seven in 1983–84, eight in 1985, and nine this season. Prior to leaving for USC, fans thought that Smith would win ten in 1987.
- This season was the first of two that Arizona appeared in the Aloha Bowl, with the other being four years later in 1990.
- An Arizona player was honored as the Pac-10 defensive player of the year for the second time, as linebacker Byron Evans won the award, joining Ricky Hunley, who was honored in 1983.

== After the season ==
At the conclusion of the season, Smith left Arizona to accept the head coaching position at USC, due to the fact that the Trojans’ football tradition lasted longer than the Wildcats and that he would be offered more money since Los Angeles (where USC is located) is a much larger market than Tucson, and that Arizona didn't pay him as much money. Smith would be fired by USC after the 1992 season and would later become coach at Missouri from 1994 to 2000.

To replace Smith, the Wildcats hired Hawaii coach Dick Tomey, to take over the program (coincidentally, Arizona's Aloha Bowl victory occurred on Hawaii's home field). Arizona believed that Tomey would build a chemistry with the players and to help rebuild the team after Smith's departure. Tomey would build the Wildcats to greater heights, highlighted by a dominant defense in the early-to-mid 1990s. Tomey stepped down as coach after the 2000 season.

The 1986 season was a memorable one for the Wildcats and fans thanked Smith for turning the program around during the 1980s as well as the dominance over ASU. Although Smith died in 2008, his legacy as Arizona coach would live on in Wildcat memories.
