= Tony Leiker =

American football player (born 1964)

No. 96
- Position: Defensive end

Personal information
- Born: September 24, 1964 (age 62); Hays, Kansas, U.S.
- Listed height: 6 ft 5 in (1.96 m)
- Listed weight: 250 lb (113 kg)

Career information
- High school: Silver Lake (Silver Lake, Kansas)
- College: Coffeyville (1983–1984); Stanford (1985–1986)
- NFL draft: 1987: 7th round, 172nd overall pick

Career history
- Green Bay Packers (1987); Minnesota Vikings (1988)*
- * Offseason or practice squad member only

Awards and highlights
- First-team All-Pac-10 (1986)

Career NFL statistics
- Games played: 1
- Stats at Pro Football Reference

Anthony Wade Leiker (born September 26, 1964) is an American former professional football player who was a defensive end in the National Football League (NFL). He played college football for the Coffeyville Red Ravens and Stanford Cardinal and was selected by the Green Bay Packers in the seventh round of the 1987 NFL draft. He was initially released by the Packers but later returned and appeared in one game during the 1987 NFL strike as a replacement player. He later signed with the Minnesota Vikings before retiring in 1988.

== Early life ==
Leiker was born on September 24, 1964, in Hays, Kansas. He grew up in Silver Lake, Kansas, a town of 1,500, and attended Silver Lake High School. At Silver Lake, he played football and basketball. A lineman, he was named all-state as a senior in 1982. Leiker graduated from Silver Lake in 1983. After high school, he hoped to play college football for the Kansas Jayhawks, telling The Wichita Eagle that "I would have given my left arm and both legs to have played at KU ... I went in and talked to Coach [Mike] Gottfried. I almost had tears in my eyes. I wanted it so bad. He looked at me like I didn't exist." Without receiving an offer to play for Kansas, he decided to enter the junior college route and joined the Coffeyville Red Ravens.

== College career ==
Leiker was a backup defensive tackle for the Red Ravens as a freshman in 1982. He helped the team win the national championship. He then played at defensive end as a sophomore and "emerged as a star", according to The Peninsula Times Tribune. At Coffeyville, he was also a top student, receiving "A" grades in all classes but one. He received athletic scholarship offers from many programs after his sophomore year and transferred to the Stanford Cardinal in 1985.

Playing defensive tackle under coach Jack Elway, Leiker became a starter four games into the 1985 season. In a game that season, he helped the Cardinal defense hold the San Jose State Spartans to negative-31 rushing yards. He finished the season with 68 tackles and a team-leading four sacks. Prior to his senior season, he set a team record with a clean and jerk lift of 630 pounds (290 kg). He started for the Cardinal in the 1986 season and was named first-team All-Pac-12 Conference, as well as an honorable mention All-American. Additionally, he was an Academic All-American in the 1985 and 1986 seasons. He was suspended from the team prior to their 1986 Gator Bowl appearance after testing positive for anabolic steroids; he released a statement telling that "I made a mistake and would like to apologize ... I have nothing else to say".

== Professional career ==
Leiker was selected by the Green Bay Packers in the seventh round (172nd overall) of the 1987 NFL draft to play defensive end. He signed with the Packers on July 24, 1987, but was later released with an injury on September 7. He later re-signed with the Packers on September 23, as a replacement player during the 1987 NFL strike. He appeared in the team's Week 4 win against the Minnesota Vikings as a starter but saw no further action and was released on October 19. He signed with the Minnesota Vikings on March 30, 1988, but later left the team on July 23, "saying pro football wasn't for him", according to the Star Tribune.
