= 1986 Aloha Bowl =

American college football game

1986 Jeep Eagle Aloha Bowl
Arizona Wildcats	North Carolina Tar Heels
(8–3)	(7–3–1)
30	21
Head coach: Larry Smith	Head coach: Dick Crum
AP / Coaches; 16 / 13
	1	2	3	4	Total
Arizona	0	13	17	0	30
North Carolina	0	0	7	14	21
- Date: December 27, 1986
- Season: 1986
- Stadium: Aloha Stadium
- Location: Halawa, Hawaii
- MVP: Chuck Cecil (Arizona)
- Referee: Doug Toole (WAC)
- Attendance: 26,743

United States TV coverage
- Network: ABC
- Announcers: Al Michaels and Mike Adamle

The 1986 Aloha Bowl was a college football bowl game, played as part of the 1985–86 bowl game schedule of the 1986 NCAA Division I-A football season. It was the 5th Aloha Bowl. It was played on December 27, 1986, at Aloha Stadium in Halawa, Hawaii. The game matched the Arizona Wildcats of the Pacific-10 Conference (Pac-10) against the North Carolina Tar Heels of the Atlantic Coast Conference (ACC).

== Scoring summary ==
=== First quarter ===
- No scoring

=== Second quarter ===
- UA – Coston 31-yard FG
- UA – Adams 1-yard run (Coston kick)
- UA – Coston 38-yard FG

=== Third quarter ===
- UA – Valder 52-yard FG
- UA – Horton 13-yard pass from Jenkins (Coston kick)
- UA – Greathouse 5-yard run (Coston kick)
- NC – Dorn 58-yard run (Gliarmis kick)

=== Fourth quarter ===
- NC – Marriott 6-yard pass from Maye (Gliarmis kick)
- NC – Maye 2-yard run (Gliarmis kick)

This was Arizona's first ever bowl win, after four previous losses and one tie in their previous five bowl appearances.

== Statistics ==
Statistics	North Carolina	Arizona
First downs	18	15
Rushes–yards	197	137
Passing yards	178	187
Return yards	6	51
Interceptions	0	1
Total offense	375	324
Punts–average	6–36.5	7–31.4
Fumbles–lost	5–5	3–1
Penalties–yards	3–25	6–45
Possession time	26:45	33:15
