= 1986 Washington State Cougars football team =

American college football season

1986 Washington State Cougars football
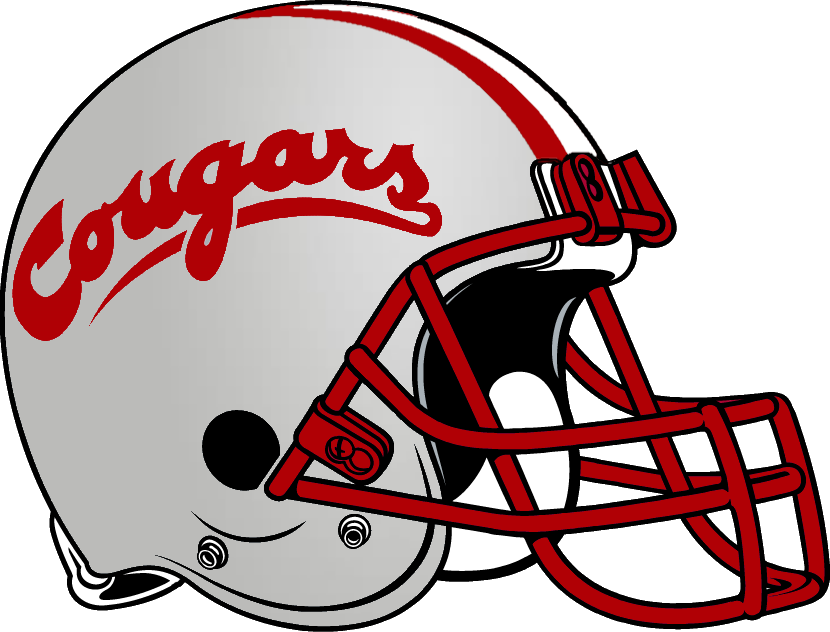
- Conference: Pacific-10 Conference
- Record: 3–7–1 (2–6–1 Pac-10)
- Head coach: Jim Walden (9th season)
- Home stadium: Martin Stadium

1986 Pacific-10 Conference football standings
	Conf.					Overall
Team	W		L		T	W		L		T
No. 4 Arizona State $	5	–	1	–	1	10	–	1	–	1
No. 14 UCLA	5	–	2	–	1	8	–	3	–	1
No. 18 Washington	5	–	2	–	1	8	–	3	–	1
No. 11 Arizona	5	–	3	–	0	9	–	3	–	0
Stanford	5	–	3	–	0	8	–	4	–	0
USC	5	–	3	–	0	7	–	5	–	0
Oregon	3	–	5	–	0	5	–	6	–	0
Washington State	2	–	6	–	1	3	–	7	–	1
California	2	–	7	–	0	2	–	9	–	0
Oregon State	1	–	6	–	0	3	–	8	–	0
$ – Conference champion; Rankings from AP Poll

The 1986 Washington State Cougars football team was an American football team that represented Washington State University in the Pacific-10 Conference (Pac-10) during the 1986 NCAA Division I-A football season. In their ninth and final season under head coach Jim Walden, the Cougars compiled a 3–7–1 record (2–6–1 in Pac-10, eighth place) and were outscored 312 to 221.

The Cougars tied eventual Rose Bowl champion Arizona State in Tempe in late September, then beat USC by twenty points in Pullman, but lost their final five games and dropped in the standings.

WSU's statistical leaders in 1986 included senior quarterback Ed Blount with 1,882 passing yards, Kerry Porter with 921 rushing yards, and Kitrick Taylor with 523 receiving yards. Notable underclassmen included quarterback Timm Rosenbach, guard Mike Utley, and future head coach Paul Wulff.

Walden departed for Iowa State in the Big Eight Conference in mid-December, and was succeeded by Dennis Erickson, who returned to the Palouse (four years at Idaho) in January 1987 after just one season at Wyoming.

== Schedule ==
Date	Opponent	Site	Result	Attendance	Source
September 6	UNLV*	Martin Stadium; Pullman, WA	W 34–14	17,000	
September 13	San Jose State*	Martin Stadium; Pullman, WA	L 13–20	15,000	
September 20	at California	California Memorial Stadium; Berkeley, CA	L 21–31	41,500	
September 27	at No. 11 Arizona State	Sun Devil Stadium; Tempe, AZ	T 21–21	70,543	
October 4	Oregon State	Martin Stadium; Pullman, WA	W 24–14	25,200	
October 11	No. 9 USC^{†}	Martin Stadium; Pullman, WA	W 34–14	26,000	
October 25	at No. 17 UCLA	Rose Bowl; Pasadena, CA	L 16–54	46,189	
November 1	at Stanford	Stanford Stadium; Stanford, CA	L 12–42	35,000	
November 8	No. 17 Arizona	Martin Stadium; Pullman, WA	L 6–31	17,000	
November 15	at Oregon	Autzen Stadium; Eugene, OR	L 17–27	25,137	
November 22	No. 12 Washington	Martin Stadium; Pullman, WA (Apple Cup)	L 23–44	40,000	
*Non-conference game; ^{†}Homecoming; Rankings from AP Poll released prior to the game

== Game summaries ==
=== UNLV ===
Team	1	2	3	4	Total
UNLV	0	7	0	7	14
• Washington St	21	3	7	3	34

- Date: September 6
- Location: Martin Stadium
- Game attendance: 17,000

Scoring summary
Q1	WSU	Taylor 11 yard pass from Blount (Adams kick)	WSU 7–0
Q1	WSU	Blount 14 yard run (Adams kick)	WSU 14–0
Q1	WSU	Collins 71 yard interception return (Adams kick)	WSU 21–0
Q2	UNLV	Woods 5 yard run (Libonati kick)	WSU 21–7
Q2	WSU	Adams 32 yard field goal	WSU 24–7
Q3	WSU	Wood 15 yard pass from Blount (Adams kick)	WSU 31–7
Q4	WSU	Obrastoff 44 yard field goal	WSU 34–7
Q4	UNLV	Jones 10 yard run (Libonati kick)	WSU 34–14

=== at Oregon ===
Washington State Cougars (3–5–1) at Oregon Ducks (3–6)

Quarter	1	2	3	4	Total
Washington St	3	0	7	7	17
Oregon	6	7	7	7	27

at Autzen Stadium, Eugene, Oregon

- Date: November 15
- Game attendance: 25,137

Game information

First quarter

- WSU – Kevin Adams 31-yard field goal, 9:54. Washington St 3–0. Drive: 6 plays, 23 yards.
- ORE – Rod Green 28-yard pass from Chris Miller (kick failed), 0:58. Oregon 6–3. Drive: 9 plays, 78 yards.

Second quarter

- ORE – Rod Green 17-yard pass from Chris Miller (Matt MacLeod kick), 0:21. Oregon 13–3. Drive: 8 plays, 87 yards.

Third quarter

- ORE – Derek Loville 8-yard run (Matt MacLeod kick), 11:48. Oregon 20–3. Drive: 8 plays, 75 yards.
- WSU – Kitrick Taylor 23-yard pass from Ed Blount (Kevin Adams kick), 0:38. Oregon 20–10. Drive: 9 plays, 80 yards.

Fourth quarter

- ORE – Matt Brock recovered fumble in end zone (Matt MacLeod kick), 0:51. Oregon 27–10.
- WSU – Kitrick Taylor 64-yard pass from Ed Blount (Kevin Adams kick), 0:28. Oregon 27–17. Drive: 2 plays, 64 yards.

Top passers

- WSU – Ed Blount – 12/27, 270 yards, 2 TD, INT
- ORE – Chris Miller – 20/35, 297 yards, 2 TD, INT

Top rushers

- WSU – Timm Rosenbach – 5 rushes, 9 yards
- ORE – Derek Loville – 28 rushes, 139 yards, TD

Top receivers

- WSU – Kitrick Taylor – 4 receptions, 102 yards, 2 TD
  Victor Wood – 4 receptions, 102 yards
- ORE – Rod Green – 4 receptions, 78 yards, 2 TD

External videos
- 1986 Washington State at Oregon – game film (no sound)

=== Washington ===
#12 Washington Huskies at Washington State Cougars

Quarter	1	2	3	4	Total
Washington	7	14	10	13	44
Washington St	0	10	7	6	23

at Martin Stadium, Pullman, Washington

- Date: November 22, 1986
- Game attendance: 40,000
- Gainesville Sun. November 23, 1986 Page 4F

Game information

First quarter

- WASH – Rod Jones 3-yard pass from Chris Chandler (Jeff Jaeger kick). Washington 7–0. Drive:

Second quarter

- WSU – Ed Tingstad 3-yard run (Kevin Adams kick). Tie 7–7. Drive:
- WSU – Kevin Adams 51-yard field goal. Washington St 10–7. Drive:
- WASH – Tony Covington 2-yard run (Jeff Jaeger kick). Washington 14–10. Drive:
- WASH – Matt Slater 25-yard pass from Chris Chandler (Jeff Jaeger kick). Washington 21–10. Drive:

Third quarter

- WASH – Matt Slater 38-yard pass from Chris Chandler (Jeff Jaeger kick). Washington 28–10. Drive:
- WASH – Jeff Jaeger 43-yard field goal. Washington 31–10. Drive:
- WASH – Jeff Jaeger 26-yard field goal. Washington 34–10. Drive:
- WSU – Kerry Porter 2-yard run (Kevin Adams kick). Washington 34–17. Drive:

Fourth quarter

- WASH – Matt Slater 25-yard pass from Chris Chandler (Jeff Jaeger kick). Washington 41–17. Drive:
- WSU – Kerry Porter 9-yard run (pass failed). Washington 41–23. Drive:
- WASH – Jeff Jaeger 27-yard field goal, 3:16. Washington 44–23. Drive:

Top passers

- WASH – Chris Chandler – 15/20, 204 yards, 4 TD
- WSU – Ed Blount – 16/30, 240 yards, 2 int

Top rushers

- WASH – Vince Weathersby – 25 rushes, 177 yards
- WSU – Kerry Porter – 25 rushes, 90 yards, 2 TD

Top receivers

- WASH – Matt Slater – 4 receptions, 106 yards, 3 TD
- WSU – Rodd Olson – 6 receptions, 94 yards

== Personnel ==
1986 Washington State Cougars football team roster
Players
Coaches
Offense

Pos.	#	Name	Class
WR	85	Mark Bircher
QB	10	Ed Blount	Sr
C	62	Alan Boatman	Sr
RB	31	Steve Broussard	Fr
WR	24	Rick Chase	Sr
OT	68	Chris Dyko	So
OT	52	Dave Fakkema	So
RB		Danny Grant
OL	73	John Husby	So
WR	88	Michael James	Sr
OT	72	Ken Kuiper	So
TE	89	Chris Leighton	Sr
G	66	Ian Lindner	Sr
TE	46	Rodd Olson	Fr
TE	81	Mel Orchard	So
RB	30	Kerry Porter	Sr
RB		Michael Pringle
RB	22	Rich Reed
QB	3	Timm Rosenbach	Fr
WR	47	Cotton Sears	Sr
WR	2	Tim Stallworth	Fr
WR	8	Kitrick Taylor	Sr
RB	11	Ed Tingstad	So
G	60	Mike Utley	So
TE	82	Doug Wellsandt	Fr
WR	13	Victor Wood	So
C	56	Paul Wulff	Fr

Defense

Pos.	#	Name	Class
DL	87	Marvin Adams	Jr
LB	55	Tunieau Alipate	So
DL		Rob Carpenter
DE	67	Rob Cleveland	Sr
S	25	Ron Collins	Sr
DE	67	Ivan Cook	So
DT	97	Tim Downing	Fr
LB	57	Brian Forde	Jr
LB	43	Bob Gregory	Sr
DB	41	James Hasty	Jr
DE	93	Chris Hiller	Jr
DB		Artie Holmes
CB	18	Shawn Landrum	So
DT	91	Mark Ledbetter	Fr
DB	42	Ron Lee	So
LB	40	Maury Metcalf	So
LB	41	Bob O'Neal	Fr
CB	20	Ricky Reynolds	Sr
DT	75	Tony Savage	Fr
S	6	Kevin Thomasson	Sr

Special teams

Pos.	#	Name	Class
K	4	Kevin Adams	Jr
P	45	Rob Myers	Fr
K		Nick Obrastoff

Head coach

- Jim Walden (9th year)

Coordinators/assistant coaches

- Jim Burrow (DB)
- Dave Elliott (LB)
- Jon Fabris (TE)
- Gary Gagnon (RB)
- Lindsay Hughes
- Steve Morton (OL)
- Robin Ross (DL)
- Mel Sanders
- Ken Woody (WR)

Legend

- (C) Team captain
- (S) Suspended
- (I) Ineligible
- Injured
- Redshirt

== NFL draft ==
Four Cougars were selected in the 1987 NFL draft.

Player	Position	Round	Overall	Franchise
Ricky Reynolds	CB	2	36	Tampa Bay Buccaneers
Kitrick Taylor	WR	5	128	Kansas City Chiefs
Kerry Porter	RB	7	171	Buffalo Bills
Michael James	WR	8	202	Houston Oilers
