= Scott Stephen =

American football player (born 1964)

No. 54, 50
- Position: Linebacker

Personal information
- Born: June 18, 1964 (age 62); Los Angeles, California, U.S.
- Listed height: 6 ft 2 in (1.88 m)
- Listed weight: 232 lb (105 kg)

Career information
- High school: Manual Arts (Los Angeles)
- College: Arizona State
- NFL draft: 1987: 3rd round, 69th overall pick

Career history
- Green Bay Packers (1987–1991); Los Angeles Rams (1992); Phoenix Cardinals (1993)*; Buffalo Bills (1994)*
- * Offseason or practice squad member only

Awards and highlights
- Second-team All-American (1986); First-team All-Pac-10 (1986); Second-team All-Pac-10 (1985)

Career NFL statistics
- Sacks: 4.5
- Interceptions: 5
- Fumble recoveries: 4
- Stats at Pro Football Reference

Scott Dewitt Stephen (born June 18, 1964) is an American former professional football player who was a linebacker in the National Football League (NFL).

Stephen was born and raised in Los Angeles, California and played scholastically at Manual Arts High School. He played collegiately for the Arizona State Sun Devils and as a senior was honored as a second-team All-American by both Football News and Gannett News Service.

Stephen was selected by the Green Bay Packers in the third-round of the 1987 NFL draft. He spent five seasons with the Packers, starting all 16 games in both 1989 and 1990. He then finished his career playing one year for the Los Angeles Rams.
