= John Paye =

American football player (born 1965)

No. 15
- Position: Quarterback

Personal information
- Born: March 30, 1965 (age 61); Stanford, California, U.S.
- Listed height: 6 ft 3 in (1.91 m)
- Listed weight: 205 lb (93 kg)

Career information
- High school: Menlo (Atherton, California)
- College: Stanford
- NFL draft: 1987: 10th round, 275th overall pick

Career history
- San Francisco 49ers (1987–1988)

Awards and highlights
- 2× Second-team All-Pac-10 (1985, 1986)

John Paye (born March 30, 1965) is an American former professional football player who was a quarterback in the National Football League (NFL), and also a former high school basketball coach. He is the older brother of Kate Paye, who is currently the head coach of the Stanford Cardinal women's basketball team.

== Early life ==
A 1983 graduate of Menlo School in Atherton, California, Paye lettered in baseball, basketball, and football. In his senior year, Menlo won the California Interscholastic Federation (CIF) Division II basketball championship. One of Paye's teammates was Eric Reveno, who played with Paye on the Stanford basketball team and is currently the coach at Brown University.

== College and professional career ==
Paye was a starter in football and basketball at Stanford University in the Pac-10 Conference. With All-American John Elway moving on to the NFL, Paye won the starting job at quarterback as a true freshman in 1983, and also started at point guard that year for the Cardinal basketball team; he was the last NCAA Division I athlete to start in both football and basketball as a freshman.

In the 1984 football season, Paye shared time at quarterback with Fred Buckley, and became the starter for the 1985 and 1986 season. In 1986, he led Stanford to an 8–3 record and an invitation to the Gator Bowl against the Clemson Tigers. This was Stanford's first bowl appearance in eight years, but Paye was unable to play due to a shoulder injury. Backup Greg Ennis started instead, and Stanford lost a close game, 27–21.

Paye was selected in the tenth round of the 1987 NFL draft by the San Francisco 49ers and stayed two seasons with the team, but saw no action in the regular season.

== Coaching career ==
After leaving pro football, Paye returned to Menlo as the girls' basketball coach, coaching his sister Kate. Paye guided the team to three CIF Division V state championships from 1989–1991. He coached boys' basketball at Woodside Priory School in the 1995–1996 season and coached girls' basketball at Notre Dame High School in Belmont, California. He returned to coach girls' basketball again at Menlo School in 2008, where his team won another CIF state championship, this time in Division II, in 2019. He retired from coaching basketball in 2023, though he stayed on at the school as the girls' flag football coach.
