= 1986 Oregon Ducks football team =

American college football season

1986 Oregon Ducks football
- Conference: Pacific-10 Conference
- Record: 5–6 (3–5 Pac-10)
- Head coach: Rich Brooks (10th season)
- Offensive coordinator: Bob Toledo (4th season)
- Offensive scheme: I formation
- Defensive coordinator: Denny Schuler (1st season)
- Base defense: 5–2
- Captains: Chris Miller; John Wolf
- Home stadium: Autzen Stadium

1986 Pacific-10 Conference football standings
	Conf.					Overall
Team	W		L		T	W		L		T
No. 4 Arizona State $	5	–	1	–	1	10	–	1	–	1
No. 14 UCLA	5	–	2	–	1	8	–	3	–	1
No. 18 Washington	5	–	2	–	1	8	–	3	–	1
No. 11 Arizona	5	–	3	–	0	9	–	3	–	0
Stanford	5	–	3	–	0	8	–	4	–	0
USC	5	–	3	–	0	7	–	5	–	0
Oregon	3	–	5	–	0	5	–	6	–	0
Washington State	2	–	6	–	1	3	–	7	–	1
California	2	–	7	–	0	2	–	9	–	0
Oregon State	1	–	6	–	0	3	–	8	–	0
$ – Conference champion; Rankings from AP Poll

The 1986 Oregon Ducks football team represented the University of Oregon in the 1986 NCAA Division I-A football season. Playing as a member of the Pacific-10 Conference (Pac-10), the team was led by head coach Rich Brooks, in his tenth year, and played their home games at Autzen Stadium in Eugene, Oregon. They finished the season with a record of five wins and six losses (5–6 overall, 3–5 in the Pac-10).

== Schedule ==
Date	Time	Opponent	Site	Result	Attendance	Source
September 6	6:30 pm	at San Jose State*	Spartan Stadium; San Jose, CA	W 21–14	23,150	
September 13	1:00 pm	Colorado*	Autzen Stadium; Eugene, OR	W 32–30	26,135	
September 20	1:00 pm	No. 17 Arizona	Autzen Stadium; Eugene, OR	L 17–41	28,773	
September 27	11:00 am	at No. 4 Nebraska*	Memorial Stadium; Lincoln, NE	L 14–48	76,185	
October 4	6:30 pm	at No. 9 USC	Los Angeles Memorial Coliseum; Los Angeles, CA (rivalry)	L 21–35	51,340	
October 11	1:00 pm	No. 15 Arizona State	Autzen Stadium; Eugene, OR	L 17–37	28,522	
October 18	1:00 pm	Stanford^{†}	Autzen Stadium; Eugene, OR (rivalry)	L 7–41	28,226	
October 25	1:00 pm	at No. 8 Washington	Husky Stadium; Seattle, WA (rivalry)	L 3–38	58,466	
November 1	1:00 pm	at California	California Memorial Stadium; Berkeley, CA	W 27–9	32,000	
November 15	1:00 pm	Washington State	Autzen Stadium; Eugene, OR	W 27–17	25,137	
November 22	1:00 pm	at Oregon State	Parker Stadium; Corvallis, OR (Civil War)	W 49–28	36,204	
*Non-conference game; ^{†}Homecoming; Rankings from AP Poll released prior to the game; All times are in Pacific time

== Season summary ==
=== Washington State ===
Washington State Cougars (3–5–1) at Oregon Ducks (3–6)

Quarter	1	2	3	4	Total
Washington St	3	0	7	7	17
Oregon	6	7	7	7	27

at Autzen Stadium, Eugene, Oregon

- Date: November 15
- Game attendance: 25,137

Game information

First quarter

- WSU – Kevin Adams 31-yard field goal, 9:54. Washington St 3–0. Drive: 6 plays, 23 yards.
- ORE – Rod Green 28-yard pass from Chris Miller (kick failed), 0:58. Oregon 6–3. Drive: 9 plays, 78 yards.

Second quarter

- ORE – Rod Green 17-yard pass from Chris Miller (Matt MacLeod kick), 0:21. Oregon 13–3. Drive: 8 plays, 87 yards.

Third quarter

- ORE – Derek Loville 8-yard run (Matt MacLeod kick), 11:48. Oregon 20–3. Drive: 8 plays, 75 yards.
- WSU – Kitrick Taylor 23-yard pass from Ed Blount (Kevin Adams kick), 0:38. Oregon 20–10. Drive: 9 plays, 80 yards.

Fourth quarter

- ORE – Matt Brock recovered fumble in end zone (Matt MacLeod kick), 0:51. Oregon 27–10.
- WSU – Kitrick Taylor 64-yard pass from Ed Blount (Kevin Adams kick), 0:28. Oregon 27–17. Drive: 2 plays, 64 yards.

Top passers

- WSU – Ed Blount – 12/27, 270 yards, 2 TD, INT
- ORE – Chris Miller – 20/35, 297 yards, 2 TD, INT

Top rushers

- WSU – Timm Rosenbach – 5 rushes, 9 yards
- ORE – Derek Loville – 28 rushes, 139 yards, TD

Top receivers

- WSU – Kitrick Taylor – 4 receptions, 102 yards, 2 TD
  Victor Wood – 4 receptions, 102 yards
- ORE – Rod Green – 4 receptions, 78 yards, 2 TD

External videos
- 1986 Washington State at Oregon – game film (no sound)

== Personnel ==
1986 Oregon Ducks football team roster
Players			Coaches
Offense: Pos. / # / Name / Class; QB / 12 / Chris Miller / Sr	Defense: Pos. / # / Name / Class	Special teams: Pos. / # / Name / Class; K / / Matt MacLeod	Head coach: Rich Brooks; Coordinators/assistant coaches: Bob Toledo; Legend: (C) Team captain; (S) Suspended; (I) Ineligible; Injured; Redshirt

== NFL draft ==
Two Ducks were selected in the 1987 NFL draft, which lasted twelve rounds (335 selections).

Player	Position	Round	Pick	Franchise
Chris Miller	Quarterback	1	13	Atlanta Falcons
Cliff Hicks	Defensive back	3	74	Los Angeles Rams
