= Darryl Harris (running back) =

American football player (born 1966)

No. 32
- Position: Running back

Personal information
- Born: February 20, 1966 (age 60); Jackson, Mississippi, U.S.
- Listed height: 5 ft 10 in (1.78 m)
- Listed weight: 178 lb (81 kg)

Career information
- High school: Garey (Pomona, California)
- College: Arizona State
- NFL draft: 1988: undrafted

Career history
- Minnesota Vikings (1988); Green Bay Packers (1989)*; Montreal Machine (1991–1992)
- * Offseason or practice squad member only

Awards and highlights
- First-team All-Pac-10 (1987); Second-team All-Pac-10 (1986)
- Stats at Pro Football Reference

Darryl Lynn “DeeHar” Harris (born February 20, 1966) is an American former professional football player, who entered the National Football League (NFL) as a free agent with the 1988 Minnesota Vikings.

== Biography ==
In 1982, Harris was part of the Garey High School Vikings of Pomona, California, who won their first CIF championship. He was recognized as Athlete of the Year in 1982, rushing for 2404 yards in one season, 3rd All Time CIF rushing record, setting the state rushing record for a junior. Harris was a high school All-American who also participated in basketball and track.

As a junior on the Arizona State University Sun Devils, his team won the 1987 Rose Bowl. He rushed for 1042 yards that year and gained 109 yards on 23 carries during the Rose Bowl. During his senior year at ASU, he led the Sun Devils in rushing (942 yards), earning All-Pac-10 honors. He also achieved an All-American honorable mention.

Harris was signed by the Minnesota Vikings in 1988, and was a kick-off return specialist for the team. A 5'10” 178 lb runningback, he had a stint with the Green Bay Packers in the 1989-90 pre-season, where he was injured and released. He was then picked up by the World League of American Football (NFLE - WLAF), where he was one of the running backs and return specialists for the Montreal Machine during the 1991 and 1992 seasons.

In 2013, Harris lives with his wife in the high desert of Southern California. He coaches and mentors young athletes and participates in speaking engagements.
