= Kevin Gogan =

American football player (born 1964)

No. 66
- Positions: Guard, tackle

Personal information
- Born: November 2, 1964 (age 62); Pacifica, California, U.S.
- Listed height: 6 ft 7 in (2.01 m)
- Listed weight: 325 lb (147 kg)

Career information
- High school: Sacred Heart Cathedral Preparatory (San Francisco, California)
- College: Washington
- NFL draft: 1987: 8th round, 206th overall pick

Career history
- Dallas Cowboys (1987–1993); Los Angeles / Oakland Raiders (1994–1996); San Francisco 49ers (1997–1998); Miami Dolphins (1999); San Diego Chargers (2000)

Awards and highlights
- 2× Super Bowl champion (XXVII, XXVIII); Second-team All-Pro (1998); 3× Pro Bowl (1994, 1997, 1998); Second-team All-Pac-10 (1986)

Career NFL statistics
- Games played: 213
- Games started: 179
- Fumble recoveries: 4
- Stats at Pro Football Reference

Kevin Patrick Gogan (born November 2, 1964) is an American former professional football player who was a guard in the National Football League (NFL) for the Dallas Cowboys, Los Angeles/Oakland Raiders, San Francisco 49ers, Miami Dolphins, and San Diego Chargers. He played college football for the Washington Huskies and was selected in the eighth round by the Dallas Cowboys in the 1987 NFL draft. With the Cowboys, Gogan won Super Bowl XXVII and Super Bowl XXVIII, both over the Buffalo Bills.

== Early life ==
Gogan attended Sacred Heart Cathedral Preparatory in San Francisco, California. He helped his football team win 2 city championships as a two-way player (offensive and defensive tackle).

He also lettered in baseball, where he started as a catcher, before being forced to move to first base as a senior, because his size didn't allow the umpires to see the home plate.

== College career ==
Gogan accepted a football scholarship from the University of Washington, to play under head coach Don James. He became a three-year starter at right tackle.

As a senior, he missed 2 games with a sprained knee. He received honorable mention All-American and second-team All-Pac-10 honors.

== Professional career ==
Pre-draft measurables
Height	Weight	Arm length	Hand span	40-yard dash	10-yard split	20-yard split	20-yard shuttle	Vertical jump	Broad jump
6 ft 7 in (2.01 m)	310 lb (141 kg)	32 3/4 in (0.83 m)	9 3/4 in (0.25 m)	5.46 s	1.88 s	3.18 s	4.88 s	20.5 in (0.52 m)	7 ft 4 in (2.24 m)
All values from NFL Combine

=== Dallas Cowboys ===
Gogan was selected by the Dallas Cowboys in the eight round (206th overall) of the 1987 NFL draft, as part of a change in the offensive line philosophy, when the team started to value size and strength over speed and athletic ability. He became a starter at the right tackle as a rookie, when Phil Pozderac announced his retirement in Week 6 of the season after the strike.

On August 3, 1988, he was suspended 30 days for marijuana use. In 1989, he missed 3 games with an injured toe. His attitude and intensity earned him the nickname "Big Nasty".

In 1990, he was relegated to a reserve role after Nate Newton was named the starter at right tackle. He started 4 games at left tackle in place of an injured Mark Tuinei and one game at right guard. He also was used as the third tight end in short-yardage situations.

In 1991, he was named the starter at left guard, replacing Crawford Ker, who left the team via Plan B free agency. His blocking helped the offensive line become one of the best units in the NFL, while contributing to Emmitt Smith leading the league in rushing yards (1,563) and Michael Irvin in receiving yards (1,523).

In 1992, he became a backup after Nate Newton was moved to left guard, in order to accommodate Erik Williams as the starter at right tackle. He also was used as the third tight end in short-yardage situations. He started in the season finale at left guard in place of an injured Newton.

In 1993, he beat out John Gesek as the starter at right guard. His role in one of the greatest offensive lines in NFL history was detailed in NFL Network's 2013 A Football Life episode "The Great Wall of Dallas".

Before the start of the 1994 season, four of the Cowboys offensive linemen were free agents, so management focused on re-signing Newton. Gogan opted to leave and was replaced with free agent Derek Kennard.

=== Los Angeles/Oakland Raiders ===
On April 17, 1994, he signed as free agent with the Los Angeles Raiders, where he was named the starter at right guard. He was a three-year starter and received his first Pro Bowl selection.

=== San Francisco 49ers ===
On February 24, 1997, Gogan signed as free agent with the San Francisco 49ers. Although he didn't fit the team's offensive line scheme, he received Pro Bowl honors two years in a row at right guard. In 1998, he helped Garrison Hearst set a team rushing record with 1,549 yards and received second-team All-Pro honors.

During the fourth quarter of the 1998 Pro Bowl, Gogan was ejected for kicking Neil Smith in the groin. Smith was also ejected for throwing punches, the first Pro Bowl ejections since the game was moved to Hawaii in 1980.

On March 1, 1999, the 49ers had salary cap problems and traded him to the Miami Dolphins in exchange for a fifth-round draft choice (#157-Terry Jackson).

=== Miami Dolphins ===
In 1999, he reunited with former head coach Jimmy Johnson. He began the season as the starter at left guard, but he was later moved to the right side because of the play of Mark Dixon. He ended up in a platoon situation with Kevin Donnalley, alternating starts. He started 10 games and extended his consecutive games played streak to over 150 contests.

On February 25, 2000, he was waived because of age and salary cap issues.

=== San Diego Chargers ===
On June 5, 2000, he signed as a free agent with the San Diego Chargers and started 14 games at right guard. On February 28, 2001, he was released and replaced with Kendyl Jacox.

== Personal life ==
Gogan was named to three Pro Bowls and had a reputation as being one of the league's toughest players during his career. He is currently the NFL analyst for NBX.com and is also an assistant football coach for Mount Si High School in Snoqualmie, Washington.
