= Jack Elway =

American football coach (1931–2001)

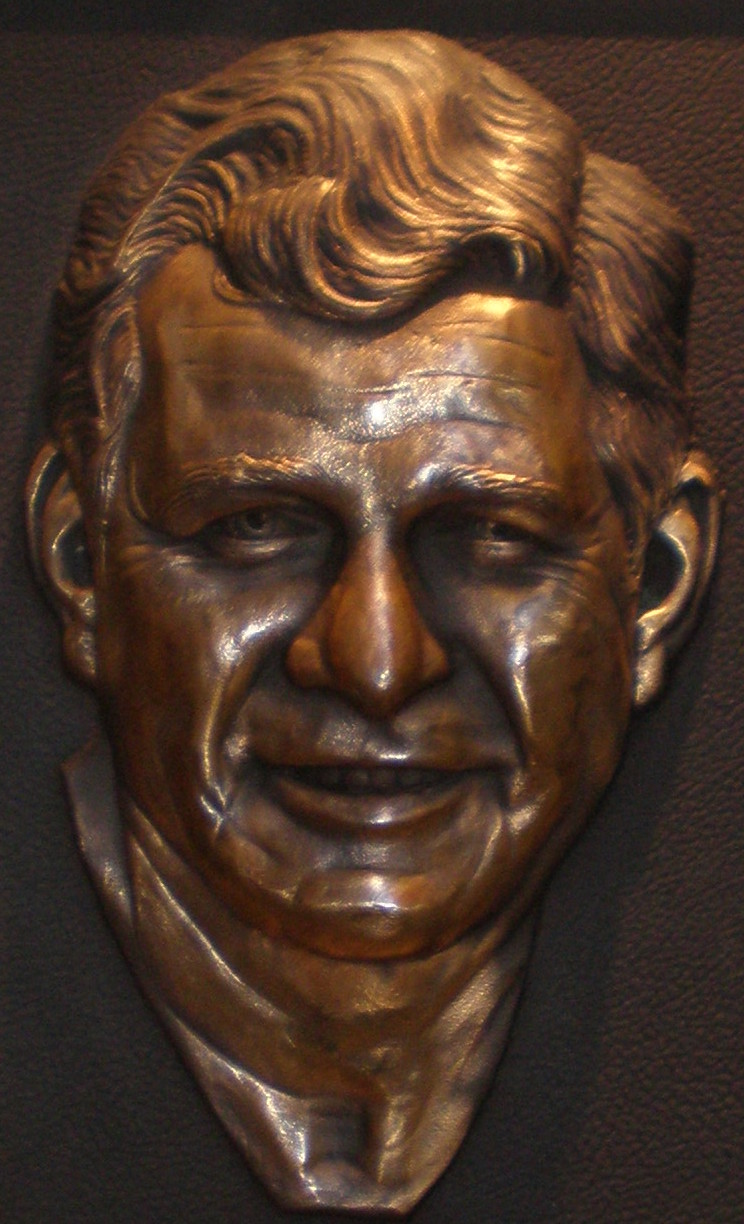
- Elway as he appears on a plaque at the San Jose Sports Hall of Fame

Biographical details
- Born: May 30, 1931; Aberdeen, Washington, U.S.
- Died: April 15, 2001 (aged 69); Palm Springs, California, U.S.

Playing career
- 1950: Washington State
- Position: Quarterback

Coaching career (HC unless noted)
- 1953–1960: Port Angeles HS (WA)
- 1961–1966: Grays Harbor
- 1967–1971: Montana (assistant)
- 1972–1975: Washington State (assistant)
- 1976–1978: Cal State Northridge
- 1979–1983: San Jose State
- 1984–1988: Stanford
- 1991–1992: Frankfurt Galaxy

Administrative career (AD unless noted)
- 1993–1999: Denver Broncos (scout)

Head coaching record
- Overall: 80–60–4 (college); 29–19–4 (junior college); 10–10 (WLAF)
- Bowls: 0–2

Accomplishments and honors

Championships
- 1 PCAA (1981)

John Albert Elway Sr. (May 30, 1931 – April 15, 2001) was an American football player and coach. He was the head coach at California State University, Northridge from 1976 to 1978, at San Jose State University from 1979 to 1983, and at Stanford University from 1984 to 1989, compiling a career college football record of 80–60–4. Elway also served as the head coach for the Frankfurt Galaxy of the World League of American Football (WLAF) from 1991 to 1992, tallying a mark of 10–10. He was the father of John Elway, Pro Football Hall of Fame quarterback.

== Early life ==
A native of Hoquiam, Washington, Elway played quarterback at Hoquiam High School under head coach Jack Swarthout and graduated in 1949. He played at Washington State College in Pullman for one season until a knee surgery ended his playing career. He earned both bachelor's and master's degrees from Washington State.

== Early coaching career ==
Elway taught and coached at Port Angeles High School on the Olympic Peninsula; all three of his children were born in Port Angeles. In 1961, he was hired as the head coach at Grays Harbor College, a junior college in Aberdeen, near his hometown of Hoquiam in southwestern Washington. Following the 1966 season, he became an assistant coach in the Big Sky Conference at the University of Montana under head coach Swarthout, his high school coach.

In 1971, after five seasons in Missoula, Elway moved to his alma mater as an assistant under head coach Jim Sweeney, and stayed in Pullman for four seasons. Sweeney abruptly resigned after the 1975 season and went south to Fresno State, so in February 1976, Elway joined the staff at the University of Idaho under head coach Ed Troxel. Elway replaced Dennis Erickson, who had joined Sweeney at Fresno in December. Elway didn't stay long as an assistant in Moscow; he left in late March after only five weeks on the Vandals' staff to accept a Division II head coaching position at Cal State Northridge.

== Head coaching career ==
In late March 1976, Elway was introduced as the head coach at Cal State Northridge in the San Fernando Valley of Los Angeles. At the time, Elway's son John was a budding high school quarterback, finishing his freshman year at Pullman High School. He transferred to Granada Hills High School at the start of his sophomore year, and his play over the next three football seasons in head coach Jack Neumeier's spread offense invited scores of scholarship offers; he selected Stanford and enrolled in 1979.

After three seasons at Northridge, Jack Elway moved up the California coast (and up to Division I) to San Jose State following the 1978 season, where his first offensive coordinator was Dennis Erickson. They employed the spread offense, which Elway had picked up from Neumeier and then used at Northridge. San Jose State had considerable success, especially against nearby Stanford, where son John was the starting quarterback through the 1982 season. Jack's Spartans won three consecutive games over Stanford from 1981 to 1983, and compiled a 35–20–1 (.634) record in five seasons.

After John's graduation, Jack moved a few miles up the peninsula to Stanford in 1984, where he was the head coach for five seasons with a 25–29–2 (.464) record. In 1991, he coached the Frankfurt Galaxy of the WLAF during the team's first two years. Elway then was in the Denver Broncos' scouting department from 1993–99, the last five as director of pro scouting.

== Personal life ==
Elway was married to Jan. They had three children, including NFL Hall of Fame quarterback John Elway, and eight grandchildren.

On April 15, 2001, Jack Elway died at age 69, following an apparent heart attack at his home in Palm Springs, California. He was buried at Sunset Memorial Park in his hometown of Hoquiam, Washington. His younger daughter Jana, twin sister of John, died of lung cancer in 2002 at the age of 42.

== Head coaching record ==
=== College ===
Year	Team	Overall	Conference	Standing	Bowl/playoffs
Cal State Northridge Matadors (California Collegiate Athletic Association) (1976–1978)
1976	Cal State Northridge	8–3	1–2	3rd	
1977	Cal State Northridge	7–3–1	1–1	2nd	
1978	Cal State Northridge	5–5	0–2	3rd	
Cal State Northridge:		20–11–1	2–5		
San Jose State Spartans (Pacific Coast Athletic Association) (1979–1983)
1979	San Jose State	6–4–1	4–0–1	2nd	
1980	San Jose State	7–4	3–2	3rd	
1981	San Jose State	9–3	5–0	1st	L California
1982	San Jose State	8–3	4–2	3rd	
1983	San Jose State	5–6	3–3	T–3rd	
San Jose State:		35–20–1	19–7–1		
Stanford Cardinal (Pacific-10 Conference) (1984–1988)
1984	Stanford	5–6	3–5	T–7th	
1985	Stanford	4–7	3–5	7th	
1986	Stanford	8–4	5–3	T–4th	L Gator
1987	Stanford	5–6	4–4	T–4th	
1988	Stanford	3–6–2	1–5–2	9th	
Stanford:		25–29–2	16–22–2		
Total:		80–60–4			
National championship Conference title Conference division title or championship game berth

=== Junior college ===
Year	Team	Overall	Conference	Standing	Bowl/playoffs
Grays Harbor Chokers (Washington Junior College Conference) (1961–1966)
1961	Grays Harbor	3–4–1	3–2–1	T–3rd	
1962	Grays Harbor	2–5–1	2–3–1	5th	
1963	Grays Harbor	5–3	3–2	T–2nd	
1964	Grays Harbor	7–2	4–2	3rd	
1965	Grays Harbor	5–3–1	3–3	4th	
1966	Grays Harbor	7–2–1	3–2–1	T–3rd	
Grays Harbor:		29–19–4	18–14–3		
Total:		29–19–4			

=== Professional ===
Year	Team	Overall	Conference	Standing	Bowl/playoffs
Frankfurt Galaxy (WLAF) (1991–1992)
1991	Frankfurt Galaxy	7–3	1–1	3rd European	
1992	Frankfurt Galaxy	3–7	3–1	2nd European	
Frankfurt Galaxy:		10–10			
Total:		10–10			
