= 1986 Gator Bowl =

1986 Mazda Gator Bowl
Stanford Cardinal	Clemson Tigers
(8–3)	(7–2–2)
Pac-10	ACC
21	27
Head coach: Jack Elway	Head coach: Danny Ford
AP / Coaches; 20 / 17	AP / Coaches; NR / 18
	1	2	3	4	Total
Stanford	0	0	7	14	21
Clemson	7	20	0	0	27
- Date: December 27, 1986
- Season: 1986
- Stadium: Gator Bowl Stadium
- Location: Jacksonville, Florida
- MVP: Rodney Williams (QB, Clemson); Brad Muster (RB, Stanford)
- Referee: Richard Burleson (SEC)
- Attendance: 80,104

United States TV coverage
- Network: CBS
- Announcers: Verne Lundquist, Pat Haden, and John Dockery

The 1986 Gator Bowl (December) game was a post-season college football bowl game between the Stanford Cardinal and the Clemson Tigers, played on December 27, 1986, at Gator Bowl Stadium in Jacksonville, Florida. It was the 42nd edition of the bowl game. Through a sponsorship agreement announced in November, the bowl was officially known as the Mazda Gator Bowl.

== Teams ==
=== Stanford Cardinal ===
Under third-year head coach Jack Elway, Stanford was making its first bowl appearance since the 1978 Bluebonnet Bowl. The Cardinal was led by running back Brad Muster, who was only the second Cardinal back to rush for more than 1,000 yards in a season. Stanford's starting quarterback, John Paye, was sidelined for the game due to a shoulder injury and backup Greg Ennis was named the starter.

=== Clemson Tigers ===
The champions of the Atlantic Coast Conference, Clemson had recorded ties in its last two regular season games. Under head coach Danny Ford, the Tigers were led by tailbacks Kenny Flowers and Terrence Flagler.

== Game summary ==
Clemson completely dominated the first half of the game, recording 291 yards of offense and 15 first downs, and scored touchdowns on runs from quarterback Rodney Williams and backs Chris Lancaster and Ray Williams. David Treadwell added two field goals to put the Tigers up 27–0 at halftime.

Stanford recovered in the second half, holding the Tigers scoreless while gradually bringing the score closer. Muster scored on a one-yard run in the third quarter, and then twice more on fourth quarter passes from Ennis. The Cardinal had several chances to tie or win the game, but Ennis was intercepted inside the 10-yard line on one drive, and turned the ball over on downs with less than two minutes remaining.

== Scoring ==
=== First quarter ===
- Clemson - Chris Lancaster 5-yard run (David Treadwell kick)

=== Second quarter ===
- Clemson - Rodney Williams 1-yard run (Treadwell kick)
- Clemson - Treadwell 22-yard field goal
- Clemson - Ray Williams 14-yard run
- Clemson - Treadwell 46-yard field goal

=== Third quarter ===
- Stanford - Brad Muster 1-yard run (David Sweeney kick)

=== Fourth quarter ===
- Stanford - Muster 13-yard pass from Greg Ennis (Sweeney kick)
- Stanford - Muster 37-yard pass from Ennis (Sweeney kick)

== Aftermath ==
This was Coach Elway's only winning season with the Cardinal. This was the first of a run of three straight ACC titles for Danny Ford's Clemson teams.

Muster and Rodney Williams shared Most Valuable Player honors. Muster would go on to play for the NFL's Chicago Bears. Junior Clemson kicker David Treadwell was named a 1987 consensus All-American and would go on to a successful NFL kicking career with the Denver Broncos and New York Giants.

Through the first 75 editions of the Gator Bowl (1946–2020), Stanford's appearance in 1986 was the only time that a Pac-10 or Pac-12 team played in the bowl.
