= Chuck Cecil =

American football player and coach (born 1964)

Arizona Wildcats
- Title: Senior defensive assistant

Personal information
- Born: November 8, 1964 (age 61); Red Bluff, California, U.S.
- Listed height: 6 ft 0 in (1.83 m)
- Listed weight: 185 lb (84 kg)

Career information
- High school: Helix (La Mesa, California)
- College: Arizona
- NFL draft: 1988: 4th round, 89th overall pick

Career history

Playing
- Green Bay Packers (1988–1992); Phoenix Cardinals (1993); Cleveland Browns (1995)*; Houston Oilers (1995)
- * Offseason or practice squad member only

Coaching
- Tennessee Titans (2001–2003) Defensive asst./quality control; Tennessee Titans (2004–2006) Safeties/nickelbacks coach; Tennessee Titans (2007–2008) Defensive backs coach; Tennessee Titans (2009–2010) Defensive coordinator; St. Louis/Los Angeles Rams (2012–2016) Secondary coach; Arizona (2018–2020) Senior defensive analyst; Arizona (2019) Interim defensive coordinator; Arizona (2021–2023) Safeties coach; Arizona (2024–present) Senior defensive assistant

Awards and highlights
- Pro Bowl (1992); Consensus All-American (1987); Pac-10 Defensive Player of the Year (1987); 2× First-team All-Pac-10 (1986, 1987); Second-team All-Pac-10 (1985); University of Arizona Sports Hall of Fame; Arizona Wildcats Jersey No. 6 retired

Career NFL statistics
- Tackles: 461
- Interceptions: 16
- Touchdowns: 1
- Stats at Pro Football Reference
- Coaching profile at Pro Football Reference
- College Football Hall of Fame

Charles Douglas Cecil (born November 8, 1964) is an American football coach and former player in the National Football League (NFL). He is a senior defensive assistant for the University of Arizona, his alma mater. He previously served as a defensive assistant for the Tennessee Titans and Los Angeles Rams. Cecil also spent two seasons (1999–2000) as a television analyst for University of Arizona football games. As a player, he was a Pro Bowl safety.

== Early life ==
Born in Red Bluff, California, Cecil grew up in Hanford and La Mesa; he graduated from Helix High School in La Mesa, where he was a standout player on a defense which set a school record for fewest points allowed per game and won a state title. At 6 ft 0 in (1.83 m) and 150 lb (68 kg) as a senior, Cecil was considered too small to be a collegiate star and thus was not offered a scholarship out of high school.

== Playing career ==
=== College ===
Cecil attended the University of Arizona, where he walked-on for the Wildcats. He proved the recruiters wrong by eventually earning consensus All-America and Pacific-10 Conference Defensive Player of the Year honors after his nine-interception senior season in 1987. He held the Pac-10 record for career interceptions, with 21 (Lamont Thompson later broke the mark with 24), and set the Wildcats' school single-game record (and tied the Pac-10 record) with four interceptions against Stanford in 1987.

In the 1986 rivalry game against fourth-ranked Arizona State (9–0–1), Cecil returned an interception 105 yards for a 34–17 Wildcats victory in Tucson. This play has been voted the greatest play in Wildcat football history.

Cecil was inducted into the Wildcats' Sports Hall of Fame in 1993 and into the College Football Hall of Fame in 2009.

=== Professional ===
Selected by the Green Bay Packers in the fourth round of the 1988 NFL draft (89th overall), Cecil was known for his thunderous tackling and aggressive style during his time as a safety for the Packers (1988–1992), Cardinals (1993), and Oilers (1995). He earned a trip to the Pro Bowl and garnered All-Madden status in 1992 when he recorded four interceptions and 102 tackles on the season. In 95 career games he totaled 400 tackles and 16 interceptions. During his years with the Packers, he earned the nickname "Scud" Cecil due to his hit-or-miss approach to tackling opponents. He often left his feet and led with his helmet, and much like the infamous missiles launched during the Gulf War – would occasionally miss completely or arrive late.

Cecil is regarded as among the most vicious hitters in National Football League history. He was featured on the cover of Sports Illustrated in 1993 (October 11 issue) with the question: "Is Chuck Cecil Too Vicious for the NFL?" Many photos taken of Cecil during games showed him with a bloodied nose. Recurring concussions forced him into retirement.

== Coaching career ==
In 2001, Cecil accepted a coaching position for the Tennessee Titans under Jeff Fisher, for whom he had played in his final season (when the team was the Houston Oilers). Cecil served as a defensive quality control assistant for three seasons. He was promoted in 2004, to work with the safeties and nickel backs. His responsibilities expanded in 2007 to cover all of the defensive backs.

On February 12, 2009, Cecil was named the Titans' defensive coordinator, replacing the departed Jim Schwartz, who had taken the position of head coach for the Detroit Lions.

On October 3, 2010, during a game against the Denver Broncos, Cecil gave NFL officials the middle-finger gesture in an attempt to protest a neutral zone infraction call against one of his players. Live close-up video of Cecil was being aired at the time, and the gesture was broadcast without editing. For his inappropriate action, he was fined $40,000 by the league.

On January 20, 2011, it was announced that Cecil would not be retained as the Titans' defensive coordinator. He was informed of this decision on January 18. The Titans ranked 26th in total yards allowed and 29th against the pass in the 2010 season.

On February 16, 2011, ESPN.com reported that Cecil would interview with the Pittsburgh Steelers to be their next secondary coach. He was to fill the void left by Ray Horton when he departed to become the defensive coordinator of the Arizona Cardinals. On February 13, 2012, he was hired as the St. Louis Rams defensive secondary coach.

=== Return to college ===
Cecil was hired as a special advisor on July 28, 2017, at his alma mater, the University of Arizona. Cecil became interim defensive coordinator for the first time on November 2, 2019, when Arizona parted ways with defensive coordinator Marcel Yates. On December 30, 2020, Cecil was to join Jedd Fisch's coaching staff as safeties coach.

== Personal life ==
Cecil is married to author, columnist and television producer, Carrie Gerlach Cecil. They have one daughter, Charli.
