= 1986 Washington Huskies football team =

American college football season

1986 Washington Huskies football

Sun Bowl, L 6–28 vs. Alabama
- Conference: Pacific-10 Conference

Ranking
- Coaches: No. 17
- AP: No. 18
- Record: 8–3–1 (5–2–1 Pac-10)
- Head coach: Don James (12th season)
- Offensive coordinator: Gary Pinkel (3rd season)
- Defensive coordinator: Jim Lambright (9th season)
- MVP: Reggie Rogers
- Captains: Kevin Gogan; Rod Jones; Rick Fenney; Steve Alvord; Reggie Rogers; Tim Peoples
- Home stadium: Husky Stadium

1986 Pacific-10 Conference football standings
	Conf.					Overall
Team	W		L		T	W		L		T
No. 4 Arizona State $	5	–	1	–	1	10	–	1	–	1
No. 14 UCLA	5	–	2	–	1	8	–	3	–	1
No. 18 Washington	5	–	2	–	1	8	–	3	–	1
No. 11 Arizona	5	–	3	–	0	9	–	3	–	0
Stanford	5	–	3	–	0	8	–	4	–	0
USC	5	–	3	–	0	7	–	5	–	0
Oregon	3	–	5	–	0	5	–	6	–	0
Washington State	2	–	6	–	1	3	–	7	–	1
California	2	–	7	–	0	2	–	9	–	0
Oregon State	1	–	6	–	0	3	–	8	–	0
$ – Conference champion; Rankings from AP Poll

The 1986 Washington Huskies football team was an American football team that represented the University of Washington during the 1986 NCAA Division I-A football season. In its 12th season under head coach Don James, the team compiled an 8–3–1 record, finished in a tie for second place in the Pacific-10 Conference, and outscored its opponents by a combined total of 378 to 197. Reggie Rogers was selected as the team's most valuable player. Rogers, Kevin Gogan, Rod Jones, Rick Fenney, Steve Alvord, and Tim Peoples were the team captains.

== Schedule ==
Date	Opponent	Rank	Site	Result	Attendance	Source
September 13	No. 10 Ohio State*	No. 17	Husky Stadium; Seattle, WA	W 40–7	61,071	
September 20	No. 11 BYU*	No. 7	Husky Stadium; Seattle, WA	W 52–21	61,197	
September 27	at No. 12 USC	No. 6	Los Angeles Memorial Coliseum; Los Angeles, CA	L 10–20	58,023	
October 4	California	No. 12	Husky Stadium; Seattle, WA	W 50–18	58,911	
October 11	at No. 18 Stanford	No. 12	Stanford Stadium; Stanford, CA	W 24–14	52,000	
October 18	Bowling Green*	No. 9	Husky Stadium; Seattle, WA	W 48–0	57,075	
October 25	Oregon	No. 8	Husky Stadium; Seattle, WA (rivalry)	W 38–3	58,466	
November 1	at No. 7 Arizona State	No. 6	Sun Devil Stadium; Tempe, AZ	L 21–34	71,589	
November 8	at Oregon State	No. 13	Parker Stadium; Corvallis, OR	W 28–12	29,541	
November 15	No. 19 UCLA	No. 10	Husky Stadium; Seattle, WA	T 17–17	59,916	
November 22	at Washington State	No. 12	Martin Stadium; Pullman, WA (Apple Cup)	W 44–23	40,000	
December 25	vs. No. 13 Alabama*	No. 12	Sun Bowl; El Paso, TX (Sun Bowl)	L 6–28	48,722	
*Non-conference game; Rankings from AP Poll released prior to the game

== Rankings ==
Ranking movements Legend: ██ Increase in ranking ██ Decrease in ranking т = Tied with team above or below ( ) = First-place votes
	Week														
Poll	Pre	1	2	3	4	5	6	7	8	9	10	11	12	13	Final
AP	16 т	17	7 (1)	6 (1)	12	12	9	8	6	13	10	12	13	12	18
Coaches	16 т	13	7	7	13	12	9	8	6	13	10	12	12	11	17

== Game summaries ==
=== Ohio State ===
Ohio State at Washington

Team	1	2	3	4	Total
Buckeyes	0	0	7	0	7
• Huskies	0	24	9	7	40

- Date: September 13
- Location: Husky Stadium
- Game attendance: 61,071

=== BYU ===
BYU at Washington

Team	1	2	3	4	Total
Cougars	7	0	0	14	21
• Huskies	15	27	3	7	52

- Date: September 20
- Location: Husky Stadium
- Game attendance: 61,197

=== California ===
Team	1	2	3	4	Total
California	0	10	0	8	18
• Washington	20	6	17	7	50

- Date: Saturday, October 4
- Location: Husky Stadium, Seattle, WA
- Game attendance: 58,911

Scoring summary
1	Washington	Jaeger 47-yard field goal	Washington 3-0
1	Washington	L. Hill 43-yard pass from Chandler (Jaeger kick)	Washington 10-0
1	Washington	Jaeger 42-yard field goal	Washington 13-0
1	Washington	L. Hill 24-yard pass from Chandler (Jaeger kick)	Washington 20-0
2	California	Richards 67-yard run (Rix kick)	Washington 20-7
2	Washington	Fenney 3-yard run (pass failed)	Washington 26-7
2	California	Rix 43-yard field goal	Washington 26-10
3	Washington	Jaeger 31-yard field goal	Washington 29-10
3	Washington	Hall 37-yard interception return (Jaeger kick)	Washington 36-10
3	Washington	R. Jones 4-yard pass from Chandler (Jaeger kick)	Washington 43-10
4	California	Powers 1-yard run (Richards pass from Kev. Brown)	Washington 43-18
4	Washington	Cole 17-yard pass from Conklin (Cleland kick)	Washington 50-18

=== Washington State ===
#12 Washington Huskies at Washington State Cougars

Quarter	1	2	3	4	Total
Washington	7	14	10	13	44
Washington St	0	10	7	6	23

at Martin Stadium, Pullman, Washington

- Date: November 22, 1986
- Game attendance: 40,000
- Gainesville Sun. November 23, 1986 Page 4F

Game information

First quarter

- WASH – Rod Jones 3-yard pass from Chris Chandler (Jeff Jaeger kick). Washington 7–0. Drive:

Second quarter

- WSU – Ed Tingstad 3-yard run (Kevin Adams kick). Tie 7–7. Drive:
- WSU – Kevin Adams 51-yard field goal. Washington St 10–7. Drive:
- WASH – Tony Covington 2-yard run (Jeff Jaeger kick). Washington 14–10. Drive:
- WASH – Matt Slater 25-yard pass from Chris Chandler (Jeff Jaeger kick). Washington 21–10. Drive:

Third quarter

- WASH – Matt Slater 38-yard pass from Chris Chandler (Jeff Jaeger kick). Washington 28–10. Drive:
- WASH – Jeff Jaeger 43-yard field goal. Washington 31–10. Drive:
- WASH – Jeff Jaeger 26-yard field goal. Washington 34–10. Drive:
- WSU – Kerry Porter 2-yard run (Kevin Adams kick). Washington 34–17. Drive:

Fourth quarter

- WASH – Matt Slater 25-yard pass from Chris Chandler (Jeff Jaeger kick). Washington 41–17. Drive:
- WSU – Kerry Porter 9-yard run (pass failed). Washington 41–23. Drive:
- WASH – Jeff Jaeger 27-yard field goal, 3:16. Washington 44–23. Drive:

Top passers

- WASH – Chris Chandler – 15/20, 204 yards, 4 TD
- WSU – Ed Blount – 16/30, 240 yards, 2 int

Top rushers

- WASH – Vince Weathersby – 25 rushes, 177 yards
- WSU – Kerry Porter – 25 rushes, 90 yards, 2 TD

Top receivers

- WASH – Matt Slater – 4 receptions, 106 yards, 3 TD
- WSU – Rodd Olson – 6 receptions, 94 yards

Jeff Jaeger set NCAA career record for field goals made.

=== Vs. Alabama (Sun Bowl) ===
Washington vs. Alabama

Team	1	2	3	4	Total
No. 12 Huskies	0	6	0	0	6
• No. 13 Crimson Tide	0	7	14	7	28

- Date: December 25
- Location: Sun Bowl, El Paso, Texas
- Game attendance: 48,722
- Game weather: 45 °F (7 °C), Sunny, Wind NNE 4 mph (6.4 km/h)
- TV announcers (CBS): Brent Musburger, Ara Parseghian, John Dockery

== Roster ==
1986 Washington Huskies football team roster
Players
Coaches
Offense

Pos.	#	Name	Class
OL		Bern Brostek
QB	17	Chris Chandler	Jr
WR		David Cole
QB		Cary Conklin
RB	39	Tony Covington	So
FB	30	Rick Fenney	Sr
WR	7	Darryl Franklin	Jr
OT	72	Kevin Gogan	Sr
OL		Clay Griffith
WR	1	Lonzell Hill	Sr
RB		Aaron Jenkins
TE	84	Rod Jones	Sr
TE	82	Scott Jones	Jr
RB		Steve Jones
TE		Mike Matz
OL		Rick McLeod
RB		Andre Riley
WR		Brian Slater
OL		Garth Thomas
OL		Mike Zandofsky

Defense

Pos.	#	Name	Class
DT	93	Steve Alvord	Sr
LB	55	Ricky Andrews	Jr
LB	46	Tom Erlandson	Jr
DT	91	Brian Habib	Jr
DB		Allen James
DB		Art Malone
DB		Tim Peoples
LB		David Rill
LB		Steve Roberts
DL	51	Reggie Rogers	Sr
LB	3	Bo Yates	Jr
DB	31	Tony Zackery	Jr

Special teams

Pos.	#	Name	Class
P	9	Thane Cleland	Sr
K	18	Jeff Jaeger	Sr

Head coach

- Don James

Coordinators/assistant coaches

- Jim Lambright (DC)
- Gary Pinkel (OC)
- Jay Niemann (GA)

Legend

- (C) Team captain
- (S) Suspended
- (I) Ineligible
- Injured
- Redshirt

== NFL draft ==
Nine Huskies were selected in the 1987 NFL draft.

Player	Position	Round	Overall	Franchise
Reggie Rogers	DT	1	7	Detroit Lions
Lonzell Hill	WR	2	40	New Orleans Saints
Jeff Jaeger	PK	3	82	Cleveland Browns
Tim Peoples	S	7	174	St. Louis Cardinals
Steve Alvord	DL	8	201	St. Louis Cardinals
Kevin Gogan	T	8	206	Dallas Cowboys
Rick Fenney	FB	8	211	Minnesota Vikings
Rod Jones	TE	8	223	New York Giants
Steve Roberts	DE	11	299	Denver Broncos
