= 1986 California Golden Bears football team =

American college football season

1986 California Golden Bears football
- Conference: Pacific-10 Conference
- Record: 2–9 (2–7 Pac-10)
- Head coach: Joe Kapp (5th season)
- Home stadium: California Memorial Stadium

1986 Pacific-10 Conference football standings
	Conf.					Overall
Team	W		L		T	W		L		T
No. 4 Arizona State $	5	–	1	–	1	10	–	1	–	1
No. 14 UCLA	5	–	2	–	1	8	–	3	–	1
No. 18 Washington	5	–	2	–	1	8	–	3	–	1
No. 11 Arizona	5	–	3	–	0	9	–	3	–	0
Stanford	5	–	3	–	0	8	–	4	–	0
USC	5	–	3	–	0	7	–	5	–	0
Oregon	3	–	5	–	0	5	–	6	–	0
Washington State	2	–	6	–	1	3	–	7	–	1
California	2	–	7	–	0	2	–	9	–	0
Oregon State	1	–	6	–	0	3	–	8	–	0
$ – Conference champion; Rankings from AP Poll

The 1986 California Golden Bears football team was an American football team that represented the University of California, Berkeley in the Pacific-10 Conference (Pac-10) during the 1986 NCAA Division I-A football season. In their fifth year under head coach Joe Kapp, the Golden Bears compiled a 2–9 record (2–7 against Pac-10 opponents), finished in ninth place in the Pac-10, and were outscored by their opponents by a combined total of 325 to 145.

The team's statistical leaders included Troy Taylor with 891 passing yards, Marc Hicks with 357 rushing yards, and James Devers with 582 receiving yards.

== Schedule ==
Date	Opponent	Site	Result	Attendance	Source
September 13	at Boston College*	Alumni Stadium; Chestnut Hill, MA	L 15–21	30,544	
September 20	Washington State	California Memorial Stadium; Berkeley, CA	W 31–21	41,500	
September 27	San Jose State*	California Memorial Stadium; Berkeley, CA	L 14–35	45,000	
October 4	at No. 12 Washington	Husky Stadium; Seattle, WA	L 18–50	58,911	
October 11	Oregon State	California Memorial Stadium; Berkeley, CA	L 12–14	33,500	
October 18	No. 19 UCLA	California Memorial Stadium; Berkeley, CA (rivalry)	L 10–36	59,000	
October 25	at No. 15 Arizona	Arizona Stadium; Tucson, AZ	L 16–33	49,016	
November 1	Oregon	California Memorial Stadium; Berkeley, CA	L 9–27	32,000	
November 8	at No. 5 Arizona State	Sun Devil Stadium; Tempe, AZ	L 0–49	70,239	
November 15	at No. 13 USC	Los Angeles Memorial Coliseum; Los Angeles, CA	L 3–28	48,019	
November 22	No. 16 Stanford	California Memorial Stadium; Berkeley, CA (Big Game)	W 17–11	75,662	
*Non-conference game; Rankings from AP Poll released prior to the game

== Game summaries ==
=== Stanford ===
Stanford Cardinal at California Golden Bears

Quarter	1	2	3	4	Total
Stanford	0	3	0	8	11
California	0	10	0	7	17

at California Memorial Stadium, Berkeley, California

- Date: November 22, 1986
- Game attendance: 75,662
- Eugene Register Guard, 1986 Nov 23.

Game information

Second quarter

- CAL – Leland Rix 34-yard field goal. California 3–0. Drive:
- CAL – Wendell Peoples 5-yard pass from Kevin Brown (Leland Rix kick). California 10–0. Drive:
- STAN – David Sweeney 48-yard field goal. California 10–3. Drive:

Fourth quarter

- CAL – Mike Ford 47-yard run (Leland Rix kick), 7:36. California 17–3. Drive:
- STAN – Jeff James 69-yard pass from John Paye (pass good), 5:37. California 17–11. Drive:

Top passers

- STAN – John Paye – 23/35, 224 yards, TD
- CAL – Kevin Brown – 15/23, 221 yards, TD, 2 int

Top rushers

- STAN – Brad Muster – 18 rushes, 59 yards
- CAL – Mike Ford – 1 rush, 47 yards, TD

Top receivers

- STAN – Jeff James – 7 receptions, 138 yards, TD
- CAL – James Devers – 7 receptions, 99 yards

== Roster ==
1986 California Golden Bears football team roster
Players
Coaches
Offense

Pos.	#	Name	Class
OL		Brian Anderson
QB		Brian Bedford
QB		Kevin Brown
RB		Will Cherry
WR		Kevin Cushing
WR		Vince Delgado
WR		James Devers
WR		Mike Ford	Fr
RB		Darrin Greer
RB		Marc Hicks
QB		Brad Howe
TE		Darryl Ingram
RB		William Jackson
OL		Kam King
RB		Steve LaMothe
RB		Terence McCarty
TE		Don Noble
RB		Donald Nobles
WR		Wendell Peoples
RB		Todd Powers
RB		Chris Richards
OL		Doug Riesenberg
OL		Chuck Steele
QB		Troy Taylor
QB		D'Andre Wells
OL		David Zawatson

Defense

Pos.	#	Name	Class
LB		John Geringer	Sr
LB		Ken Harvey
DB		Gary Hein
DB		Sidney Johnson
DL		Joe Nelms
LB		Hardy Nickerson
LB		David Ortega
DB		Darryl Stallworth
DB		Derek Taylor
DL		Natu Tuatagloa
DL		Majett Whiteside

Special teams

Pos.	#	Name	Class
K		Mike Kelly
K		Leland Rix
P		Scott Tabor

Head coach

- Joe Kapp

Coordinators/assistant coaches

- Mike Rasmussen
  (Quarterbacks coach & wide receivers coach)

Legend

- (C) Team captain
- (S) Suspended
- (I) Ineligible
- Injured
- Redshirt
