= 1986 Stanford Cardinal football team =

American college football season

1986 Stanford Cardinal football

Gator Bowl, L 21–27 vs. Clemson
- Conference: Pacific-10 Conference
- Record: 8–4 (5–3 Pac-10)
- Head coach: Jack Elway (3rd season)
- Offensive scheme: West Coast
- Defensive coordinator: Dick Mannini (3rd season)
- Base defense: 4–3
- Home stadium: Stanford Stadium

1986 Pacific-10 Conference football standings
	Conf.					Overall
Team	W		L		T	W		L		T
No. 4 Arizona State $	5	–	1	–	1	10	–	1	–	1
No. 14 UCLA	5	–	2	–	1	8	–	3	–	1
No. 18 Washington	5	–	2	–	1	8	–	3	–	1
No. 11 Arizona	5	–	3	–	0	9	–	3	–	0
Stanford	5	–	3	–	0	8	–	4	–	0
USC	5	–	3	–	0	7	–	5	–	0
Oregon	3	–	5	–	0	5	–	6	–	0
Washington State	2	–	6	–	1	3	–	7	–	1
California	2	–	7	–	0	2	–	9	–	0
Oregon State	1	–	6	–	0	3	–	8	–	0
$ – Conference champion; Rankings from AP Poll

The 1986 Stanford Cardinal football team represented Stanford University in the 1986 NCAA Division I-A football season. In head coach Jack Elway's third season at Stanford, the Cardinal had its first winning season since 1980 and received its first post-season bowl invitation since 1978.

The team played their home games at Stanford Stadium in Stanford, California and competed in the Pacific-10 Conference.

== Schedule ==
Date	Opponent	Rank	Site	TV	Result	Attendance	Source
September 13	at Texas*		Texas Memorial Stadium; Austin, TX		W 31–20	74,372	
September 20	San Jose State*		Stanford Stadium; Stanford, CA (rivalry)		W 28–10	64,950	
September 27	at Oregon State		Parker Stadium; Corvallis, OR		W 17–7	21,125	
October 4	San Diego State*		Stanford Stadium; Stanford, CA		W 17–10	36,500	
October 11	No. 12 Washington	No. 18	Stanford Stadium; Stanford, CA	TBS	L 24–14	52,000	
October 18	at Oregon		Autzen Stadium; Eugene, OR (rivalry)		W 41–7	28,226	
October 25	USC	No. 19	Stanford Stadium; Stanford, CA (rivalry)	CBS	L 0–10	73,500	
November 1	Washington State		Stanford Stadium; Stanford, CA		W 42–12	35,000	
November 8	at No. 12 UCLA		Rose Bowl; Pasadena, CA (rivalry)	CBS	W 28–23	68,857	
November 22	at California	No. 16	California Memorial Stadium; Berkeley, CA (Big Game)		L 11–17	75,662	
November 30	vs. No. 12 Arizona		National Stadium; Tokyo, Japan (Coca-Cola Classic)	ESPN	W 29–24	55,000	
December 27	vs. No. 21 Clemson*	No. 20	Gator Bowl Stadium; Jacksonville, FL (Gator Bowl)	CBS	L 21–27	80,104	
*Non-conference game; Rankings from AP Poll released prior to the game

== Game summaries ==
=== At California ===
Stanford Cardinal at California Golden Bears

Quarter	1	2	3	4	Total
Stanford	0	3	0	8	11
California	0	10	0	7	17

at California Memorial Stadium, Berkeley, California

- Date: November 22, 1986
- Game attendance: 75,662
- Eugene Register Guard, 1986 Nov 23.

Game information

Second quarter

- CAL – Leland Rix 34-yard field goal. California 3–0. Drive:
- CAL – Wendell Peoples 5-yard pass from Kevin Brown (Leland Rix kick). California 10–0. Drive:
- STAN – David Sweeney 48-yard field goal. California 10–3. Drive:

Fourth quarter

- CAL – Mike Ford 47-yard run (Leland Rix kick), 7:36. California 17–3. Drive:
- STAN – Jeff James 69-yard pass from John Paye (pass good), 5:37. California 17–11. Drive:

Top passers

- STAN – John Paye – 23/35, 224 yards, TD
- CAL – Kevin Brown – 15/23, 221 yards, TD, 2 int

Top rushers

- STAN – Brad Muster – 18 rushes, 59 yards
- CAL – Mike Ford – 1 rush, 47 yards, TD

Top receivers

- STAN – Jeff James – 7 receptions, 138 yards, TD
- CAL – James Devers – 7 receptions, 99 yards

== Roster ==
1986 Stanford Cardinal football team roster
Players
Coaches
Offense

Pos.	#	Name	Class
OL		Robbie Coffin
RB		Marshall Dillard
QB		Greg Ennis
RB		Scott Eschelman
WR		Thomas Henley	Sr
WR		Jeff James	Jr
OL		Kurt Josephson
TE		Craig Landis
OL		John Mahoney
OL		Jeff Marchin	So
WR	40	Ed McCaffrey	Fr
RB		Brian Morris
WR		Carl Morris
RB	25	Brad Muster	Jr
OL		Tom Nye	Sr
OL		Andy Papathanassiou
QB	14	John Paye	Sr
TE		Jim Price
RB		Kevin B. Scott	Sr
OL		Andy Sinclair	So
TE		Eric Snelson	Jr
OL		John Zentner	So

Defense

Pos.	#	Name	Class
LB		Darron Bennett
LB		Kurt Colehower	Jr
DB		Toi Cook
DB		Walt Harris	Sr
DB		Brad Humphreys	Jr
CB		Pat Kelly	So
DL		Tony Leiker	Sr
DL		Joe Lortie
LB		Barry McKeever	So
LB		Mike Noble
DB		Bruce Richardson
LB		Kevin Richardson
DL		Eric Volta
LB		Chris Weber	Sr
LB	92	Dave Wyman	Sr

Special teams

Pos.	#	Name	Class
P		Doug Robison
K		David Sweeney

Head coach

- Jack Elway (3rd year)

Coordinators/assistant coaches

- Jimmy Walsh – Running back
- Dave Baldwin – Wide receiver
- Otto Kofler – Tight end
- Steve Axman – Offensive line
- Dick Mannini – Defensive Coordinator & defensive line
- Larry Kerr – Inside linebacker
- Jack Gilmete – Outside Linebacker
- Sonny Lubick – Secondary

Legend

- (C) Team captain
- (S) Suspended
- (I) Ineligible
- Injured
- Redshirt

== 1987 NFL draft ==
Player	Position	Round	Pick	NFL club
Dave Wyman	Linebacker	2	45	Seattle Seahawks
Thomas Henley	Wide receiver	6	152	New Orleans Saints
Tony Leiker	Defensive end	7	172	Green Bay Packers
Toi Cook	Running back	8	207	New Orleans Saints
John Paye	Quarterback	10	275	San Francisco 49ers
