= 1986 UCLA Bruins football team =

American college football season

1986 UCLA Bruins football

Freedom Bowl, W 31–10 vs. BYU
- Conference: Pacific-10 Conference

Ranking
- Coaches: No. 14
- AP: No. 14
- Record: 8–3–1 (5–2–1 Pac-10)
- Head coach: Terry Donahue (11th season)
- Offensive coordinator: Homer Smith (9th season)
- Co-defensive coordinators: Bob Field (5th season); Tom Hayes (5th season)
- Home stadium: Rose Bowl

1986 Pacific-10 Conference football standings
	Conf.					Overall
Team	W		L		T	W		L		T
No. 4 Arizona State $	5	–	1	–	1	10	–	1	–	1
No. 14 UCLA	5	–	2	–	1	8	–	3	–	1
No. 18 Washington	5	–	2	–	1	8	–	3	–	1
No. 11 Arizona	5	–	3	–	0	9	–	3	–	0
Stanford	5	–	3	–	0	8	–	4	–	0
USC	5	–	3	–	0	7	–	5	–	0
Oregon	3	–	5	–	0	5	–	6	–	0
Washington State	2	–	6	–	1	3	–	7	–	1
California	2	–	7	–	0	2	–	9	–	0
Oregon State	1	–	6	–	0	3	–	8	–	0
$ – Conference champion; Rankings from AP Poll

The 1986 UCLA Bruins football team was an American football team that represented the University of California, Los Angeles during the 1986 NCAA Division I-A football season. In their 11th year under head coach Terry Donahue, the Bruins compiled an 8–3–1 record (5–2–1 Pac-10), finished in a tie for second place in the Pacific-10 Conference, and were ranked No. 14 in the final AP poll. The Bruins went on to defeat BYU in the 1986 Freedom Bowl. On November 1, 1986, UCLA's defense scored three touchdowns against Oregon State.

UCLA's offensive leaders in 1986 were quarterback Matt Stevens with 1,869 passing yards, running back Gaston Green with 1,405 rushing yards, and wide receiver Flipper Anderson with 675 receiving yards.

== Schedule ==
Date	Opponent	Rank	Site	TV	Result	Attendance	Source
September 6	at No. 1 Oklahoma*	No. 4	Oklahoma Memorial Stadium; Norman, OK	ABC	L 3–38	75,684	
September 20	at San Diego State*	No. 19	Jack Murphy Stadium; San Diego, CA		W 45–14	50,338	
September 27	Long Beach State*	No. 16	Rose Bowl; Pasadena, CA	Prime	W 41–23	48,140	
October 4	No. 16 Arizona State	No. 15	Rose Bowl; Pasadena, CA	CBS	L 9–16	51,533	
October 11	No. 11 Arizona		Rose Bowl; Pasadena, CA	CBS	W 32–25	51,279	
October 18	at California	No. 19	California Memorial Stadium; Berkeley, CA (rivalry)		W 36–10	59,000	
October 25	Washington State	No. 17	Rose Bowl; Pasadena, CA		W 54–16	46,189	
November 1	at Oregon State	No. 15	Civic Stadium; Portland, OR		W 49–0	23,703	
November 8	Stanford^{†}	No. 12	Rose Bowl; Pasadena, CA (rivalry)	CBS	L 23–28	68,857	
November 15	at No. 10 Washington	No. 19	Husky Stadium; Seattle, WA	CBS	T 17–17	59,916	
November 22	No. 10 USC	No. 18	Rose Bowl; Pasadena, CA (Victory Bell)	Prime	W 45–25	98,370	
December 30	vs. BYU*	No. 15	Anaheim Stadium; Anaheim, CA (Freedom Bowl)	Mizlou	W 31–10	55,422	
*Non-conference game; ^{†}Homecoming; Rankings from AP Poll released prior to the game

== Rankings ==
Ranking movements Legend: ██ Increase in ranking ██ Decrease in ranking — = Not ranked т = Tied with team above or below ( ) = First-place votes
	Week														
Poll	Pre	1	2	3	4	5	6	7	8	9	10	11	12	13	Final
AP	4 (3)	16	19	16	15	—	19	17	15	12	19	18	15	15	14
Coaches	4 (2)	19	—	15	17	—	19	17 т	15	12	19	—	16	15	14

== Game summaries ==
=== At Oklahoma ===
UCLA at Oklahoma

Team	1	2	3	4	Total
Bruins	0	3	0	0	3
• Sooners	3	14	14	7	38

- Date: September 6
- Location: Oklahoma Memorial Stadium
- Game attendance: 75,684
- Television network: ABC

=== Vs. BYU (Freedom Bowl) ===
BYU vs. UCLA

Team	1	2	3	4	Total
Cougars	3	0	0	7	10
• Bruins	7	0	17	7	31

- Date: December 30
- Location: Anaheim Stadium
- Game attendance: 51,422
- TV announcers: Howard David and Jack Snow

== Personnel ==
1986 UCLA Bruins football team roster
Players
Coaches
Offense

Pos.	#	Name	Class
WR	83	Willie Anderson	Jr
TE	81	Charles Arbuckle	Fr
RB	21	Eric Ball	So
WR	8	Karl Dorrell	Sr
FB	22	Mel Farr	Jr
WR	9	Mike Farr	Fr
RB	44	Gaston Green	Jr
RB	45	Marcus Greenwood	Sr
QB	11	Matt Stevens	Sr
TE	81	Derek Tennell	Sr

Defense

Pos.	#	Name	Class
CB	2	Darryl Henley	So
DB	31	Carnell Lake	So
DB	37	Chuckie Miller	Sr
LB	41	Ken Norton Jr.	Jr
NG	40	Terry Tumey	Jr
DB	23	Marcus Turner	So

Special teams

Pos.	#	Name	Class
K	25	Alfredo Velasco	Fr

Head coach

- Terry Donahue

Coordinators/assistant coaches

Legend

- (C) Team captain
- (S) Suspended
- (I) Ineligible
- Injured
- Redshirt
