= Gaston Green =

American football player (born 1966)

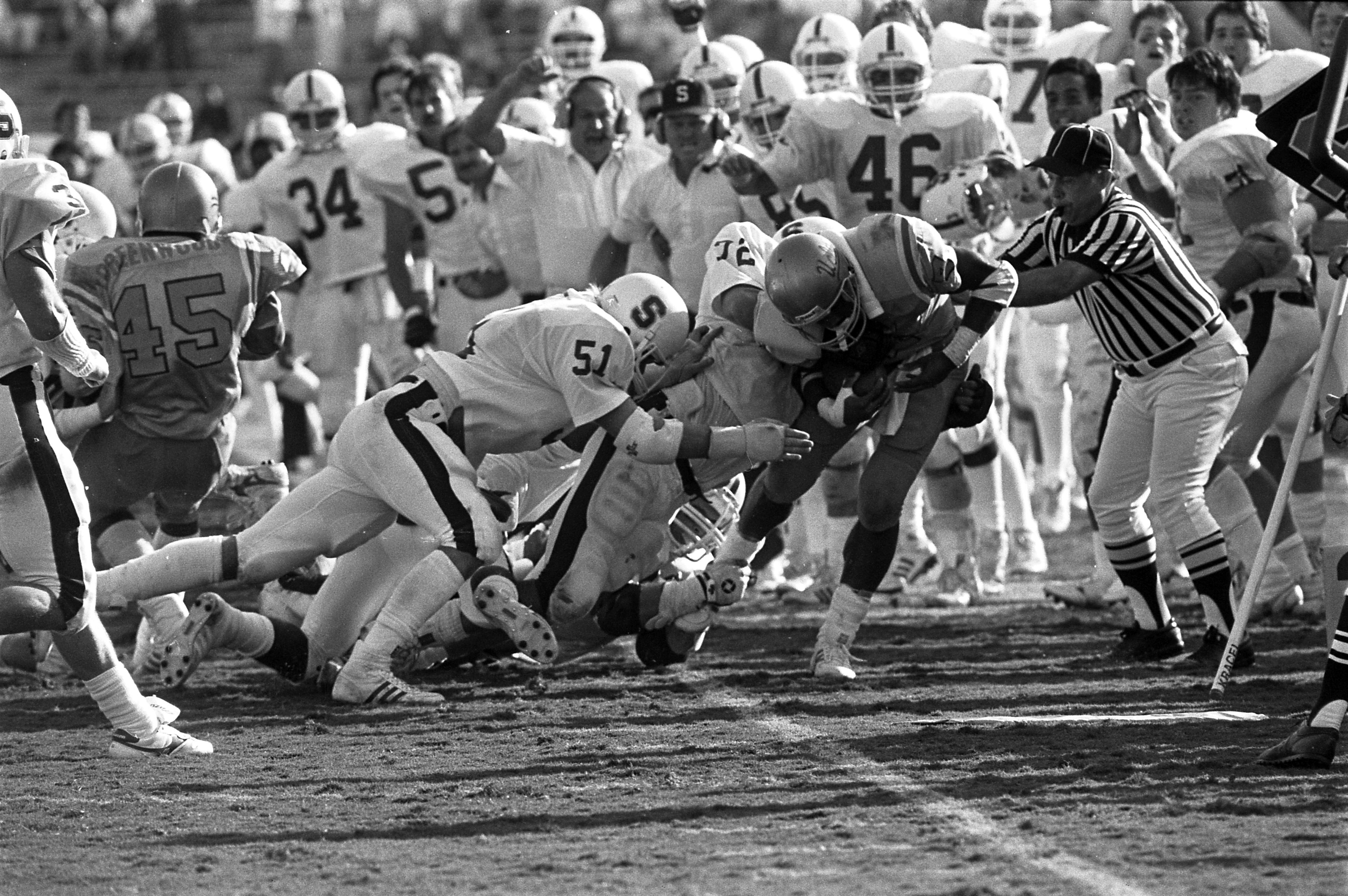
- Green (with ball, right of center), during a UCLA game, 1986

No. 44, 30, 28
- Position: Running back

Personal information
- Born: August 1, 1966 (age 60); Los Angeles, California, U.S.
- Listed height: 5 ft 10 in (1.78 m)
- Listed weight: 189 lb (86 kg)

Career information
- High school: Gardena (Los Angeles)
- College: UCLA
- NFL draft: 1988: 1st round, 14th overall pick

Career history
- Los Angeles Rams (1988–1990); Denver Broncos (1991–1992); Los Angeles Raiders (1993); London Monarchs (1996)

Awards and highlights
- Pro Bowl (1991); First-team All-American (1987); Third-team All-American (1986); 2× First-team All-Pac-10 (1986, 1987)

Career NFL statistics
- Rushing yards: 2,136
- Rushing average: 3.9
- Rushing touchdowns: 6
- Stats at Pro Football Reference

Gaston Alfred Green III (born August 1, 1966) is an American former professional football player. He was a running back in the National Football League (NFL) for the Los Angeles Rams, Denver Broncos and Los Angeles Raiders. He also played college football for the UCLA Bruins, twice earning All-American honors.

== Biography ==
Green was born in Los Angeles, California and played prep football at Gardena High School in Los Angeles and college football at the University of California, Los Angeles.

He was selected by the Los Angeles Rams in the first round (14th overall) of the 1988 NFL draft. Green played at the running back position in the NFL for five seasons from 1988 through 1992. He was a Pro Bowl selection in 1991 with the Denver Broncos, rushing for 1,037 yards. Green also played a season in Europe for the London Monarchs.

Green returned to UCLA in 2011 to complete his college degree. His 3,731-yard career record at UCLA was surpassed on November 3, 2012 by tailback Johnathan Franklin.

== NFL career statistics ==
Year	Team	GP	Att	Yds	Avg	Lng	TD	Rec	Yds	Avg	Lng	TD
1988	LAR	10	35	117	3.3	13	0	6	57	9.5	19	0
1989	LAR	6	26	73	2.8	9	0	1	-5	-5.0	-5	0
1990	LAR	15	68	261	3.8	31	0	2	23	11.5	16	1
1991	DEN	13	261	1,037	4.0	63	4	13	78	6.0	13	0
1992	DEN	14	161	648	4.0	67	2	10	79	7.9	33	0
1993	LA	0	DNP									
Career		58	551	2,136	3.9	67	6	32	232	7.2	33	1
