= 1986 USC Trojans football team =

American college football season

1986 USC Trojans football

Florida Citrus Bowl, L 7–16 vs. Auburn
- Conference: Pacific-10 Conference
- Record: 7–5 (5–3 Pac-10)
- Head coach: Ted Tollner (4th season)
- Captains: Jeff Bregel; Tim McDonald
- Home stadium: Los Angeles Memorial Coliseum

1986 Pacific-10 Conference football standings
	Conf.					Overall
Team	W		L		T	W		L		T
No. 4 Arizona State $	5	–	1	–	1	10	–	1	–	1
No. 14 UCLA	5	–	2	–	1	8	–	3	–	1
No. 18 Washington	5	–	2	–	1	8	–	3	–	1
No. 11 Arizona	5	–	3	–	0	9	–	3	–	0
Stanford	5	–	3	–	0	8	–	4	–	0
USC	5	–	3	–	0	7	–	5	–	0
Oregon	3	–	5	–	0	5	–	6	–	0
Washington State	2	–	6	–	1	3	–	7	–	1
California	2	–	7	–	0	2	–	9	–	0
Oregon State	1	–	6	–	0	3	–	8	–	0
$ – Conference champion; Rankings from AP Poll

The 1986 USC Trojans football team represented the University of Southern California (USC) in the 1986 NCAA Division I-A football season. In their fourth and final year under head coach Ted Tollner, the Trojans compiled a 7–5 record (5–3 against conference opponents), finished in a three-way tie for fourth place in the Pacific-10 Conference (Pac-10), and outscored their opponents by a combined total of 264 to 239.

Quarterback Rodney Peete led the team in passing, completing 160 of 305 passes for 2,138 yards with 10 touchdowns and 15 interceptions. Ryan Knight led the team in rushing with 148 carries for 536 yards and seven touchdowns. Ken Henry led the team in receiving yards with 43 catches for 807 yards and seven touchdowns.

== Schedule ==
Date	Time	Opponent	Rank	Site	TV	Result	Attendance	Source
September 13	4:00 p.m.	Illinois*		Los Angeles Memorial Coliseum; Los Angeles, CA	WTBS	W 31–16	51,496	
September 20	12:30 p.m.	at No. 9 Baylor*		Baylor Stadium; Waco, TX	ABC	W 17–14	35,000	
September 27	4:00 p.m.	No. 6 Washington	No. 12	Los Angeles Memorial Coliseum; Los Angeles, CA	WTBS	W 20–10	58,023	
October 4	6:30 p.m.	Oregon	No. 9	Los Angeles Memorial Coliseum; Los Angeles, CA		W 35–21	51,340	
October 11	1:00 p.m.	at Washington State	No. 9	Martin Stadium; Pullman, WA		L 14–34	26,000	
October 18	1:30 p.m.	No. 10 Arizona State^{†}	No. 15	Los Angeles Memorial Coliseum; Los Angeles, CA		L 20–29	65,874	
October 25	12:30 p.m.	at No. 19 Stanford		Stanford Stadium; Stanford, CA (rivalry)	CBS	W 10–0	73,500	
November 1	5:30 p.m.	at No. 14 Arizona	No. 18	Arizona Stadium; Tucson, AZ	PSN	W 20–13	55,046	
November 15	4:00 p.m.	California	No. 13	Los Angeles Memorial Coliseum; Los Angeles, CA	WTBS	W 28–3	48,019	
November 22	3:00 p.m.	at No. 18 UCLA	No. 10	Rose Bowl; Pasadena, CA (Victory Bell)	PSN	L 25–45	98,370	
November 29	12:30 p.m.	Notre Dame*	No. 17	Los Angeles Memorial Coliseum; Los Angeles, CA (rivalry)	CBS	L 37–38	70,614	
January 1, 1987	9:00 a.m.	vs. No. 10 Auburn*		Florida Citrus Bowl; Orlando, FL (Florida Citrus Bowl)	ABC	L 7–16	51,113	
*Non-conference game; ^{†}Homecoming; Rankings from AP Poll released prior to the game; All times are in Pacific time

== Game summaries ==
=== At No. 9 Baylor ===
USC at Baylor

Team	1	2	3	4	Total
• Trojans	0	7	0	10	17
No. 9 Bears	7	0	0	7	14

- Date: September 20
- Location: Baylor Stadium
  Waco, Texas
- Game attendance: 35,000
- TV announcers (ABC Sports): Keith Jackson (play-by-play) and Tim Brant (analyst)

Scoring summary
1		Baylor	Matt Clark 1-yard run (Terry Syler kick)	Baylor 7–0
2	0:15	USC	Tim McDonald 99-yard fumble return (Don Shafer kick)	Tied 7–7
4	7:24	Baylor	Charles Perry 3-yard run (Terry Syler kick)	Baylor 14–7
4	3:50	USC	Ken Henry 12-yard pass from Rodney Peete (Don Shafer kick)	Tied 14–14
4	0:00	USC	Don Shafer 32-yard field goal	USC 17–14

Visiting USC stunned the No. 9 Bears on Don Shafer's 32-yard field goal on the final play. Baylor dominated the game statistically, outgaining USC 408-197, holding a 26–11 advantage is first downs (including not allowing USC a first down through three quarters), and maintaining a 15-minute advantage in time of possession (37:47 to 22:13). Mirroring the result of last year's matchup, the unranked road team knocked off the host with an AP top ten ranking.

=== Vs. No. 10 Auburn (Florida Citrus Bowl) ===
Auburn vs. USC

Team	1	2	3	4	Total
• No. 10 Tigers	0	14	0	2	16
Trojans	7	0	0	0	7

- Date: January 1, 1987
- Location: Florida Citrus Bowl
  Orlando, Florida
- Game attendance: 51,113
- TV announcers (ABC Sports): Frank Gifford (play-by-play), Lynn Swann (analyst)

== Roster ==
1986 USC Trojans football team roster
Players
Coaches
Offense

Pos.	#	Name	Class
G	79	Jeff Bregel (C)	Sr
RB		Aaron Emanuel	Fr
OL		John Guerrero	So
		Ken Henry
RB		Ryan Knight
QB	16	Rodney Peete	So

Defense

Pos.	#	Name	Class
S	6	Tim McDonald (C)	Sr

Special teams

Pos.	#	Name	Class
PK	10	Don Shafer	Sr

Head coach

- Ted Tollner

Coordinators/assistant coaches

Legend

- (C) Team captain
- (S) Suspended
- (I) Ineligible
- Injured
- Redshirt
