= Ed Blount =

American football player (born 1964)

Profile
- Position: Quarterback

Personal information
- Born: February 26, 1964 (age 62); Los Angeles, California, U.S.
- Listed height: 6 ft 2 in (1.88 m)
- Listed weight: 205 lb (93 kg)

Career information
- High school: Blair (Pasadena, California)
- College: Washington State
- NFL draft: 1987: undrafted

Career history
- San Francisco 49ers (1987); Seattle Seahawks (1987)
- Stats at Pro Football Reference

Edward Blount (born February 26, 1964) is an American former professional football player who was a quarterback for one season in the National Football League (NFL) with the San Francisco 49ers and Seattle Seahawks in 1987. He played college football for the Washington State Cougars.

== College career ==
Blount was a member of the Washington State Cougars for five seasons, redshirting his true freshman season. He suffered a serious shoulder injury and then spent the 1984 and 85 seasons as the backup to Mark Rypien. He was the Cougars starting quarterback as a redshirt senior. He completed 13 of 20 passes for 201 yards and 2 touchdowns to snap a 29-game losing streak to USC with a 34–14 victory. Blount finished the season with 1,882 yards, 11 touchdowns and 11 interceptions on 117 of 227 passing and rushed 183 yards and three touchdowns.

== Professional career ==
Blount was signed by the San Francisco 49ers as a replacement player during the 1987 NFL players strike. He served as the 49ers third-string quarterback and appeared in one game, rushing once for no gain and fumbled during the play. He was released when the strike ended. Blount was signed by the Seattle Seahawks, but was released one week later. He played one season overseas in Italy and played semi-professional football for the Burbank Bandits of the High Desert Football League for several years, occasionally earning tryouts from professional teams but was never offered a contract.
