= Alfred Jenkins (quarterback) =

American gridiron football player (born 1964)

Profile
- Position: Quarterback

Personal information
- Born: April 1, 1964 (age 62)
- Listed height: 6 ft 3 in (1.91 m)
- Listed weight: 218 lb (99 kg)

Career information
- High school: Lynwood (Lynwood, California)
- College: Arizona (1982–1986)
- NFL draft: 1987: 9th round, 248th overall pick

Career history
- Washington Redskins (1987); Ottawa Rough Riders (1988); Dallas Texans (1991)

Career AFL statistics
- Comp. / Att.: 132 / 257
- Passing yards: 1,428
- TD–INT: 21–11
- QB rating: 70.63
- Rushing TDs: 4
- Stats at ArenaFan.com

Alfred D. Jenkins (born April 1, 1964) is an American former professional football quarterback who played one season with the Dallas Texans of the Arena Football League (AFL). He was selected by the Washington Redskins in the ninth round of the 1987 NFL draft after playing college football at the University of Arizona. Jenkins was also a member of the Ottawa Rough Riders of the Canadian Football League (CFL).

== Early life and college ==
Alfred D. Jenkins was born on April 1, 1964. He attended Lynwood High School in Lynwood, California.

Jenkins redshirted for the Arizona Wildcats in 1982, and lettered for them from 1983 to 1987. He completed seven of 12 passes for 154 yards and a touchdown in 1983 and also scored one rushing touchdown. In 1984, He completed 156 of 312 passes (50.0%) for 2,202 yards, 11 touchdowns, and 17 interceptions while also scoring four rushing touchdowns. His attempts, passing yards, and interceptions led the Pac-10 Conference that year. In 1985, Jenkins totaled 150 completions on 278 passing attempts (54.0%) for 1,767 yards, seven touchdowns, ten interceptions, and two rushing touchdowns. He completed 118 of 232 passes for (50.9%) for 1,573 yards, ten touchdowns, and nine interceptions as well as two rushing touchdowns his senior year in 1986.

== Professional career ==
Pre-draft measurables
Height	Weight	Arm length	Hand span	40-yard dash	10-yard split	20-yard split	20-yard shuttle	Vertical jump	Broad jump
6 ft 3 1/4 in (1.91 m)	218 lb (99 kg)	32 in (0.81 m)	10 1/4 in (0.26 m)	4.74 s	1.65 s	2.76 s	4.49 s	31.0 in (0.79 m)	9 ft 8 in (2.95 m)
All values from NFL Combine

Jenkins was selected by the Washington Redskins in the ninth round of the 1987 NFL draft. He was placed on injured reserve on September 1 and was released on October 18, 1987.

He played in one game for the Ottawa Rough Riders of the Canadian Football League in 1988 but did not record any statistics.

Jenkins played in all ten games for the Dallas Texans of the Arena Football League in 1991, completing 132 of 257 passes (51.4%) for 1,428 yards, 21 touchdowns, and 11 interceptions while also rushing 28 times for 49 yards and four touchdowns. He also made two solo tackles that season. The Texans finished the year with a 4–6 record.
