= 1986 NCAA Division I-A football rankings =

- Season: 1986
- Bowl season: 1986–87 bowl games
- Preseason No. 1: Oklahoma
- End of season champions: Penn State

Two human polls comprised the 1986 National Collegiate Athletic Association (NCAA) Division I-A football rankings. Unlike most sports, college football's governing body, the NCAA, does not bestow a national championship, instead that title is bestowed by one or more different polling agencies. There are two main weekly polls that begin in the preseason—the AP Poll and the Coaches Poll.

== Legend ==
	Increase in ranking
	Decrease in ranking
	Not ranked previous week
	National champion
(#–#)	Win–loss record
(Italics)	Number of first place votes
т	Tied with team above or below also with this symbol

== AP Poll ==
	Preseason Aug 24	Week 1 Sep 9	Week 2 Sep 16	Week 3 Sep 23	Week 4 Sep 30	Week 5 Oct 7	Week 6 Oct 14	Week 7 Oct 21	Week 8 Oct 28	Week 9 Nov 4	Week 10 Nov 11	Week 11 Nov 18	Week 12 Nov 25	Week 13 Dec 2	Week 14 (Final) Jan 3	
1.	Oklahoma (44)	Oklahoma (1–0) (55)	Oklahoma (1–0) (55)	Oklahoma (2–0) (55)	Miami (FL) (4–0) (56)	Miami (FL) (5–0) (55)	Miami (FL) (6–0) (56)	Miami (FL) (7–0) (55)	Miami (FL) (7–0) (55)	Miami (FL) (8–0) (53)	Miami (FL) (9–0) (57)	Miami (FL) (10–0) (56)	Miami (FL) (10–0) (54)	Miami (FL) (11–0) (53)	Penn State (12–0) (54)	1.
2.	Michigan (6)	Miami (FL) (2–0) (1)	Miami (FL) (3–0) (1)	Miami (FL) (3–0) (1)	Alabama (4–0) (1)	Alabama (5–0) (2)	Alabama (6–0) (2)	Alabama (7–0) (3)	Penn State (7–0) (4)	Penn State (8–0) (4)	Michigan (9–0) (1)	Penn State (10–0) (3)	Penn State (11–0) (4)	Penn State (11–0) (5)	Miami (FL) (11–1)	2.
3.	Miami (FL) (1)	Michigan (0–0) (1)	Michigan (1–0)	Alabama (4–0)	Nebraska (3–0)	Nebraska (4–0)	Nebraska (5–0)	Nebraska (6–0)	Michigan (7–0) (1)	Michigan (8–0) (1)	Penn State (9–0) (1)	Oklahoma (9–1)	Oklahoma (10–1)	Oklahoma (10–1)	Oklahoma (11–1) (3)	3.
4.	UCLA (3)	Alabama (2–0)	Alabama (3–0) (1)	Nebraska (2–0) (1)	Michigan (3–0)	Michigan (4–0)	Michigan (5–0)	Michigan (6–0)	Oklahoma (6–1)	Oklahoma (7–1)	Oklahoma (8–1)	Arizona State (9–0–1) (1)	Michigan (10–1)	Michigan (10–1)	Arizona State (10–1–1)	4.
5.	Alabama	Penn State (1–0) (1)	Penn State (1–0) (1)	Michigan (2–0)	Penn State (3–0) (1)	Penn State (4–0) (1)	Oklahoma (4–1)	Oklahoma (5–1)	Auburn (7–0)	Arizona State (7–0–1)	Arizona State (8–0–1) (1)	Nebraska (9–1)	LSU (8–2)	LSU (9–2)	Nebraska (10–2)	5.
6.	Penn State (3)	Nebraska (1–0) (1)	Nebraska (1–0) (1)	Washington (2–0) (1)	Oklahoma (2–1)	Oklahoma (3–1)	Penn State (5–0) (1)	Penn State (6–0) (1)	Washington (6–1)	Alabama (8–1) (1)	Nebraska (8–1) (1)	Michigan (9–1)	Nebraska (9–2)	Nebraska (9–2)	Auburn (10–2)	6.
7.	Texas A&M (1)	Texas A&M (0–0)	Washington (1–0) (1)	Penn State (2–0) (1)	Auburn (3–0)	Auburn (4–0)	Auburn (5–0)	Auburn (6–0)	Arizona State (6–0–1)	Nebraska (7–1)	Texas A&M (7–1)	Ohio State (9–2)	Alabama (9–2)	Arizona State (9–1–1)	Ohio State (10–3)	7.
8.	Nebraska (1)	Tennessee (1–0)	LSU (1–0)	Auburn (2–0)	Arkansas (3–0)	Arkansas (4–0)	Iowa (5–0)	Washington (5–1)	Alabama (7–1)	Texas A&M (7–1)	Auburn (8–1)	LSU (7–2)	Arizona State (9–1–1)	Texas A&M (9–2)	Michigan (11–2)	8.
9.	Ohio State	Auburn (1–0)	Baylor (2–0)	Arkansas (2–0)	USC (3–0)	USC (4–0)	Washington (4–1)	Arizona State (5–0–1)	Nebraska (6–1)	Auburn (7–1)	Ohio State (8–2)	Alabama (9–2)	Arkansas (9–2)	Arkansas (9–2)	Alabama (10–3)	9.
10.	Tennessee	Ohio State (0–1)	Auburn (1–0)	Arizona (3–0)	Arizona (4–0)	Iowa (4–0)	Arizona State (4–0–1)	Texas A&M (5–1)	Texas A&M (6–1)	Arkansas (7–1)	Washington (7–2)	USC (7–2)	Texas A&M (8–2)	Auburn (9–2)	LSU (9–3)	10.
11.	Florida State	BYU (1–0)	BYU (2–0)	Arizona State (2–0)	Iowa (3–0)	Arizona (4–0)	Texas A&M (4–1)	Iowa (5–1)	Iowa (6–1)	Ohio State (7–2)	Alabama (8–2)	Arkansas (8–2)	Ohio State (9–3)	Ohio State (9–3)	Arizona (9–3)	11.
12.	Baylor	Baylor (1–0)	Arkansas (1–0)	USC (2–0)	Washington (2–1)	Washington (3–1)	LSU (3–1)	LSU (4–1)	LSU (5–1)	UCLA (6–2)	LSU (6–2)	Washington (7–2–1)	Arizona (8–2)	Washington (8–2–1)	Baylor (9–3)	12.
13.	Florida	Florida (1–1)	Florida (1–1)	Maryland (3–0)	Baylor (3–1)	Baylor (4–1)	Mississippi State (5–1)	Mississippi State (6–1)	Arkansas (6–1)	Washington (6–2)	USC (6–2)	Texas A&M (7–2)	Washington (8–2–1)	Alabama (9–3)	Texas A&M (9–3)	13.
14.	Auburn	LSU (0–0)	Georgia (1–0)	Texas A&M (1–1)	Texas A&M (2–1)	Texas A&M (3–1)	Arkansas (4–1)	Arkansas (5–1)	Arizona (6–1)	USC (6–2)	Arizona (7–2)	Arizona (7–2)	Auburn (8–2)	Baylor (8–3)	UCLA (8–3–1)	14.
15.	LSU	Florida State (1–1)	Florida State (1–1)	Iowa (2–0)	UCLA (2–1)	Arizona State (3–0–1)	USC (4–1)	Arizona (5–1)	UCLA (5–2)	NC State (6–1–1)	Clemson (7–2)	Auburn (8–2)	UCLA (7–3–1)	UCLA (7–3–1)	Arkansas (9–3)	15.
16.	Georgia т	UCLA (0–1)	Texas A&M (0–1)	UCLA (1–1)	Arizona State (2–0–1)	LSU (2–1)	Arizona (4–1)	Clemson (5–1)	NC State (5–1–1)	Iowa (6–2)	Stanford (7–2)	Stanford (7–2)	Baylor (8–3)	Arizona (8–3)	Iowa (9–3)	16.
17.	Washington т	Washington (0–0)	Arizona (2–0)	Baylor (2–1)	Michigan State (2–1)	NC State (3–0–1)	Clemson (4–1)	UCLA (4–2)	Ohio State (6–2)	Arizona (6–2)	Arkansas (7–2)	Baylor (7–3)	USC (7–3)	Georgia (8–3)	Clemson (8–2–2)	17.
18.	BYU	Arkansas (0–0)	Arizona State (1–0)	LSU (1–1)	LSU (1–1)	Stanford (4–0)	North Carolina (4–0–1)	SMU (5–1)	USC (5–2)	LSU (5–2)	Baylor (6–3)	UCLA (6–3–1)	Georgia (7–3)	NC State (8–2–1)	Washington (8–3–1)	18.
19.	Arkansas	Georgia (0–0)	UCLA (0–1)	Michigan State (1–1)	Fresno State (3–0)	Mississippi State (4–1)	UCLA (3–2)	Stanford (5–1)	Mississippi State (6–2)	Georgia (6–2)	UCLA (6–3)	Clemson (7–2–1)	NC State (8–2–1)	Iowa (8–3)	Boston College (9–3)	19.
20.	Michigan State	Michigan State (0–0)	Notre Dame (0–1)	Florida State (1–1–1)	NC State (3–0–1)	Clemson (3–1)	Baylor (4–2) т; SMU (4–1) т	NC State (4–1–1)	Florida State (4–2–1)	Clemson (6–2)	Ole Miss (6–2–1)	Georgia (7–3)	Iowa (8–3)	Stanford (8–3)	Virginia Tech (9–2–1)	20.
	Preseason Aug 24	Week 1 Sep 9	Week 2 Sep 16	Week 3 Sep 23	Week 4 Sep 30	Week 5 Oct 7	Week 6 Oct 14	Week 7 Oct 21	Week 8 Oct 28	Week 9 Nov 4	Week 10 Nov 11	Week 11 Nov 18	Week 12 Nov 25	Week 13 Dec 2	Week 14 (Final) Jan 3	
		None	Dropped: Michigan State; Ohio State; Tennessee	Dropped: BYU; Florida; Georgia; Notre Dame	Dropped: Maryland; Florida State	Dropped: Fresno State; Michigan State; UCLA	Dropped: NC State; Stanford	Dropped: Baylor; North Carolina; USC	Dropped: Clemson; SMU; Stanford	Dropped: Florida State; Mississippi State	Dropped: Georgia; Iowa; NC State	Dropped: Ole Miss	Dropped: Clemson; Stanford	Dropped: USC	Dropped: Georgia; NC State; Stanford	

== Coaches Poll ==
	Preseason Aug 19	Week 1 Sep 9	Week 2 Sep 16	Week 3 Sep 23	Week 4 Sep 30	Week 5 Oct 7	Week 6 Oct 14	Week 7 Oct 21	Week 8 Oct 28	Week 9 Nov 4	Week 10 Nov 11	Week 11 Nov 18	Week 12 Nov 25	Week 13 Dec 2	Week 14 (Final) Jan 3	
1.	Oklahoma (36)	Oklahoma (1–0) (44)	Oklahoma (1–0) (43)	Oklahoma (2–0) (44)	Miami (FL) (4–0) (44)	Miami (FL) (5–0) (47)	Miami (FL) (6–0) (47)	Miami (FL) (7–0) (47)	Miami (FL) (7–0) (47)	Miami (FL) (8–0) (48)	Miami (FL) (9–0) (47)	Miami (FL) (10–0) (47)	Miami (FL) (10–0) (44)	Miami (FL) (11–0) (41)	Penn State (12–0) (50)	1.
2.	Michigan (1)	Miami (FL) (2–0) (1)	Miami (FL) (3–0) (3)	Miami (FL) (3–0) (3)	Alabama (1)	Alabama (5–0)	Alabama (6–0) (3)	Alabama (7–0) (3)	Michigan (7–0) (1)	Penn State (8–0) (1)	Michigan (9–0) (1)	Penn State (10–0) (2)	Penn State (11–0) (5)	Penn State (11–0) (5)	Miami (FL) (11–1)	2.
3.	Texas A&M (5)	Michigan (0–0) (1)	Michigan (1–0) (1)	Alabama (4–0) (1)	Nebraska (3–0)	Michigan (4–0)	Nebraska (5–0)	Nebraska (6–0)	Penn State (7–0) (2)	Michigan (8–0) (1)	Penn State (9–0) (2)	Oklahoma (9–1)	Oklahoma (10–1)	Oklahoma (10–1)	Oklahoma (11–1)	3.
4.	UCLA (2)	Alabama (2–0) (1)	Alabama (3–0)	Michigan (2–0) (1)	Michigan (3–0)	Penn State (4–0)	Michigan (5–0)	Michigan (6–0)	Oklahoma (6–1)	Oklahoma (7–1)	Oklahoma (8–1)	Arizona State (9–0–1)	Michigan (10–1)	Michigan (10–1)	Nebraska (10–2)	4.
5.	Penn State (2)	Penn State (1–0) (2)	Nebraska (1–0)	Nebraska (2–0)	Penn State (3–0) (1)	Nebraska (4–0)	Penn State (5–0)	Penn State (6–0)	Auburn (7–0)	Arizona State (7–0–1)	Arizona State (8–0–1)	Nebraska (9–1)	Nebraska (9–2)	Nebraska (9–2)	Arizona State (10–1–1)	5.
6.	Alabama (1)	Nebraska (1–0)	Penn State (1–0) (2)	Penn State (2–0) (2)	Oklahoma (2–1)	Oklahoma (3–1)	Oklahoma (4–1)	Oklahoma (5–1)	Washington (6–1)	Alabama (8–1)	Nebraska (8–1)	Michigan (9–1)	LSU (8–2)	LSU (9–2)	Ohio State (10–3)	6.
7.	Miami (FL) (3)	Texas A&M (0–0)	Washington (1–0)	Washington (2–0)	Auburn (3–0)	Auburn (4–0)	Auburn (5–0)	Auburn (6–0)	Arizona State (6–0–1)	Nebraska (7–1)	Texas A&M (8–1)	Ohio State (9–2)	Alabama (9–2)	Texas A&M (9–2)	Michigan (11–2)	7.
8.	Nebraska	Tennessee (1–0)	LSU (1–0)	Auburn (2–0)	USC (3–0)	USC (4–0)	Iowa (5–0)	Washington (5–1)	Alabama (7–1)	Texas A&M (7–1)	Auburn (8–1)	LSU (7–2)	Arizona State (9–1–1)	Arizona State (9–1–1)	Auburn (10–2)	8.
9.	Ohio State	BYU (1–0)	Baylor (2–0)	Arkansas (2–0)	Arkansas (3–0)	Arizona (4–0)	Washington (4–1)	Arizona State (5–0–1)	Nebraska (6–1)	Arkansas (7–1)	Ohio State (8–2)	Alabama (9–2)	Texas A&M (8–2)	Auburn (9–2)	Alabama (10–3)	9.
10.	Tennessee	Baylor (1–0)	Georgia (1–0)	Arizona (3–0)	Arizona (4–0)	Arkansas (4–0)	Arizona State (4–0–1)	Texas A&M (5–1)	Texas A&M (6–1)	Auburn (7–1)	Washington (7–2)	USC (7–2)	Arkansas (9–2)	Arkansas (9–2)	Arizona (9–3)	10.
11.	Florida State	Auburn (1–0)	Auburn (1–0)	Arizona State (2–0)	Iowa (3–0)	Iowa (4–0)	Texas A&M (4–1)	LSU (4–1)	LSU (5–1)	Ohio State (7–2)	LSU (6–2)	Texas A&M (8–2)	Arizona (8–2)	Washington (8–2–1)	LSU (9–3)	11.
12.	Baylor	Ohio State (0–1)	Arkansas (1–0)	USC (2–0)	Baylor (3–1)	Washington (3–1)	LSU (3–1)	Iowa (5–1)	Iowa (6–1)	UCLA (6–2)	USC (7–2)	Washington (7–2–1)	Washington (8–2–1)	Ohio State (9–3)	Texas A&M (9–3)	12.
13.	Auburn	Washington (0–0)	BYU (2–0)	Iowa (2–0)	Washington (2–1)	Arizona State (3–0–1)	Arkansas (4–1)	Arkansas (5–1)	Arkansas (6–1)	Washington (6–2)	Arizona (7–2)	Arkansas (8–2)	Ohio State (9–3)	Arizona (8–3)	Baylor (9–3)	13.
14.	Arkansas	Georgia (0–0)	Iowa (1–0)	Maryland (3–0)	Arizona State (2–0–1)	Baylor (4–1)	Arizona (4–1)	Mississippi State (6–1)	Arizona (6–1)	NC State (6–1–1)	Stanford (7–2)	Auburn (8–2)	Auburn (8–2)	Alabama (9–3)	UCLA (8–3–1)	14.
15.	Georgia	Arkansas (0–0)	Arizona (2–0)	UCLA (1–1)	Texas A&M (2–1)	Texas A&M (3–1)	Mississippi State (5–1)	Arizona (5–1)	UCLA (5–2)	USC (6–2)	Alabama (8–2)	Arizona (7–2)	Baylor (8–3)	UCLA (7–3–1)	Iowa (9–3)	15.
16.	BYU т	Arizona (1–0)	Maryland (2–0)	Texas A&M (1–1)	Michigan State (2–1)	Clemson (3–1)	USC (4–1)	Clemson (5–1)	NC State (5–1–1)	Iowa (6–2)	Arkansas (7–2)	Stanford (7–2)	UCLA (7–3–1)	Baylor (8–3)	Arkansas (9–3)	16.
17.	Washington т	LSU (0–0)	Arizona State (1–0)	Baylor (2–1)	UCLA (2–1)	Georgia (3–1)	Clemson (4–1)	UCLA (4–2) т	Ohio State (6–2) т	Arizona (6–2)	Clemson (7–2)	Baylor (7–3)	USC (7–3)	Stanford (8–3)	Washington (8–3–1)	17.
18.	Iowa	Maryland (1–0)	Florida State (1–1)	Michigan State (1–1)	Fresno State (3–0)	NC State (3–0–1)	North Carolina (4–0–1)	Stanford (5–1) т	Baylor (5–3) т	LSU (5–2)	Baylor (6–3)	Clemson (7–2–1)	Clemson (7–2–2)	Clemson (7–2–2)	Boston College (9–3)	18.
19.	LSU	UCLA (0–1)	Texas A&M (0–1)	Fresno State (2–0)	NC State (3–0–1)	Indiana (4–0)	UCLA (3–2)	NC State (4–1–1)	USC (5–2) т	Baylor (5–3) т	UCLA (6–3)	NC State (7–2–1)	NC State (8–2–1) т	San Jose State (9–2)	Clemson (8–2–2)	19.
20.	Maryland	Iowa (0–0)	USC (1–0)	Florida State (1–1–1)	Stanford (3–0)	North Carolina (3–0–1)	Baylor (4–2)	Baylor (4–3) т; North Carolina (4–1–1) т	Florida State (4–2–1) т	Stanford (6–2) т	NC State (6–2–1)	San Jose State (9–2); Georgia (7–3)	Florida State (6–3–1) т; San Jose State (9–2) т	Virginia Tech (8–2–1)	Florida State (7–4–1)	20.
	Preseason Aug 19	Week 1 Sep 9	Week 2 Sep 16	Week 3 Sep 23	Week 4 Sep 30	Week 5 Oct 7	Week 6 Oct 14	Week 7 Oct 21	Week 8 Oct 28	Week 9 Nov 4	Week 10 Nov 11	Week 11 Nov 18	Week 12 Nov 25	Week 13 Dec 2	Week 14 (Final) Jan 3	
		Dropped: Florida State	Dropped: UCLA	Dropped: LSU; Georgia; BYU	Dropped: Maryland; Florida State	Dropped: Michigan State; UCLA; Fresno State; Stanford	Dropped: Georgia; NC State; Indiana	Dropped: USC	Dropped: Mississippi State; Clemson; Stanford; North Carolina	Dropped: Florida State	Dropped: Iowa	Dropped: UCLA	Dropped: Stanford; Georgia	Dropped: USC; NC State; Florida State	Dropped: Stanford; San Jose State; Virginia Tech	
