= 1986–87 NCAA football bowl games =

College football postseason game series

- Season: 1986
- Number of bowls: 18
- Bowl games: December 13, 1986 – January 2, 1987
- National Championship: 1987 Fiesta Bowl
- Location of Championship: Sun Devil Stadium, Tempe, Arizona
- Champions: Penn State Nittany Lions
Bowl record by conference
Conference	Bowls	Record	Final AP poll
SEC	6	4–2 (0.667)	3
Pac-10	6	3–3 (0.500)	4
Independents	5	4–1 (0.800)	4
Big Ten	5	2–3 (0.400)	3
SWC	4	1–3 (0.250)	3
Big Eight	3	2–1 (0.667)	2
ACC	3	1–2 (0.333)	1
WAC	2	0–2 (0.000)	0
PCAA	1	1–0 (1.000)	0
MAC	1	0–1 (0.000)	0

The 1986–87 NCAA football bowl games were a series of post-season games played in December 1986 and January 1987 to end the 1986 NCAA Division I-A football season. A total of 18 team-competitive games, and two all-star games, were played. The post-season began with the California Bowl on December 13, 1986, and concluded on January 17, 1987, with the season-ending Senior Bowl.

== Schedule ==
Date	Game	Site	Time (US EST)	TV	Matchup (pre-game record)	AP pre-game rank	UPI (Coaches) pre-game rank
12/13	California Bowl	Bulldog Stadium; Fresno, California		ESPN	San Jose State 37 (9–2) (PCAA Champion), Miami 7 (8–3) (MAC Champion)	NR; NR	#19; NR
12/20	Independence Bowl	Independence Stadium; Shreveport, Louisiana		Mizlou	Ole Miss 20 (7–3–1) (SEC), Texas Tech 17 (7–4) (SWC)	NR; NR	NR; NR
12/23	Hall of Fame Bowl	Tampa Stadium; Tampa, Florida		Mizlou	Boston College 27 (8–3) (Independent), Georgia 24 (8–3) (SEC)	NR; NR	NR #17
12/25	Sun Bowl	Sun Bowl; El Paso, Texas		CBS	Alabama 28 (9–3) (SEC), Washington 6 (8–2–1) (Pac-10)	#13 #12	#14 #11
12/27	Aloha Bowl	Aloha Stadium; Honolulu, Hawaii		ABC	Arizona 30 (8–3) (Pac-10), North Carolina 21 (7–3–1) (ACC)	#16; NR	#13; NR
12/27	Gator Bowl	Gator Bowl Stadium; Jacksonville, Florida		CBS	Clemson 27 (7–2–2) (ACC Champion), Stanford 21 (8–3) (Pac-10)	NR #20	#18 #17
12/29	Liberty Bowl	Liberty Bowl Memorial Stadium; Memphis, Tennessee		Raycom Sports	Tennessee 21 (6–5) (SEC), Minnesota 14 (6–5) (Big Ten)	NR; NR	NR; NR
12/30	Holiday Bowl	Jack Murphy Stadium; San Diego, California		ESPN	Iowa 39 (8–3) (Big Ten), San Diego State 38 (8–3) (WAC Champion)	#19; NR	RV; NR
12/30	Freedom Bowl	Anaheim Stadium; Anaheim, California		Mizlou	UCLA 31 (7–3–1) (Pac-10), BYU 10 (8–4) (WAC)	#15; NR	#15; NR
12/31	Bluebonnet Bowl	Rice Stadium; Houston, Texas		Raycom Sports	Baylor 21 (8–3) (SWC), Colorado 9 (6–5) (Big Eight)	#14; NR	#16; NR
12/31	All-American Bowl	Legion Field; Birmingham, Alabama		TBS	Florida State 27 (6–4–1) (Independent), Indiana 13 (6–5) (Big Ten)	NR; NR	NR; NR
12/31	Peach Bowl	Fulton County Stadium; Atlanta		Mizlou	Virginia Tech 25 (8–2–1) (Independent), NC State 24 (8–2–1) (ACC)	NR #18	NR; NR
1/1	Florida Citrus Bowl	Florida Citrus Bowl; Orlando, Florida	12:00 PM	ABC	Auburn 16 (9–2) (SEC), USC 7 (7–4) (Pac-10)	#10; NR	#9; NR
1/1	Cotton Bowl Classic	Cotton Bowl; Dallas, Texas	1:30 PM	CBS	Ohio State 28 (9–3) (Big Ten co-Champion), Texas A&M 12 (9–2) (SWC Champion)	#11 #8	#12 #7
1/1	Sugar Bowl	Louisiana Superdome; New Orleans, Louisiana	3:30 PM	ABC	Nebraska 30 (9–2) (Big Eight), LSU 15 (9–2) (SEC Champion)	#6 #5	#5 #6
1/1	Rose Bowl	Rose Bowl; Pasadena, California	4:30 PM	NBC	Arizona State 22 (9–1–1) (Pac-10 Champion), Michigan 15 (10–1) (Big Ten co-Champion)	#7 #4	#8 #4
1/1	Orange Bowl	Miami Orange Bowl; Miami	8:00 PM	NBC	Oklahoma 42 (10–1) (Big Eight Champion), Arkansas 8 (9–2) (SWC)	#3 #9	#3 #10
1/2	Fiesta Bowl	Sun Devil Stadium; Tempe, Arizona	8:00 PM	NBC	Penn State 14 (11–0) (Independent), Miami (FL) 10 (11–0) (Independent)	#2 #1	#2 #1
