= 1986 NCAA Division I-A football season =

American college football season

1986 NCAA Division I-A season
- Number of teams: 105
- Preseason AP No. 1: Oklahoma

Postseason
- Bowl games: 18
- Heisman Trophy: Miami (FL) quarterback Vinny Testaverde
- Champion(s): Penn State (AP, Coaches, FWAA)

Division I-A football seasons
- ← 1985 1987 →

The 1986 NCAA Division I-A football season ended with Penn State winning the national championship. Coached by Joe Paterno, they defeated Miami (FL) 14–10 in the Fiesta Bowl. This Fiesta Bowl was the first in the game's history to decide the national championship, launching it into the top tier of bowls.

Miami came into the game No. 1 and Penn State No. 2. In a move that would come to symbolize the game for years to come, Miami arrived wearing combat fatigues while Penn State arrived wearing suits and ties.

Despite all the hype surrounding the Hurricanes, Penn State's defense harassed and harried Heisman Trophy winner Vinny Testaverde throughout the Fiesta Bowl. The Hurricanes committed seven turnovers, including five interceptions thrown by Testaverde – the last of which, in the end zone with 18 seconds left, won the game for the Nittany Lions.

== Conference and program changes ==
- The Missouri Valley Conference ended the hybrid nature of the conference which featured Division I-AA programs Drake, Illinois State, Indiana State, Southern Illinois, and West Texas State. Two of the league's members, Tulsa and Wichita State, became independents and remained in Division I-A.

School	1985 Conference	1986 Conference
Northern Illinois Huskies	MAC	I-A Independent
Tulsa Golden Hurricane	Missouri Valley	I-A Independent
Wichita State Shockers	Missouri Valley	I-A Independent

== Rule changes ==
- Kickoffs are moved from the 40-yard line to the 35-yard line, mirroring a change made in 1974 by the NFL, and receivers may not line up closer than 10 yards from the spot of the kickoff.
- The definition of "Roughing the passer" is expanded to prohibit throwing passers to the ground after the ball is released.
- The definition of a "catch" is clarified to require players maintain control of a ball when returning to the ground, and an incomplete pass will be called if there is doubt in the official's mind that the catch was made.
- The penalty for batting loose balls forward in the field of play or anywhere in the end zone now includes loss of down.
- Clipping that occurs behind the scrimmage line will be enforced from the previous spot.
- The loss of down penalty for ineligible man downfield penalties is removed.

== Conference standings ==
1986 Atlantic Coast Conference football standings
	Conf.					Overall
Team	W		L		T	W		L		T
No. 17 Clemson $	5	–	1	–	1	8	–	2	–	2
NC State	5	–	2	–	0	8	–	3	–	1
North Carolina	5	–	2	–	0	7	–	4	–	1
Georgia Tech	3	–	3	–	0	5	–	5	–	1
Maryland	2	–	3	–	1	5	–	5	–	1
Wake Forest	2	–	5	–	0	5	–	6	–	0
Duke	2	–	5	–	0	4	–	7	–	0
Virginia	2	–	5	–	0	3	–	8	–	0
$ – Conference champion; Rankings from AP Poll

1986 Big Eight Conference football standings
	Conf.					Overall
Team	W		L		T	W		L		T
No. 3 Oklahoma $	7	–	0	–	0	11	–	1	–	0
Colorado	6	–	1	–	0	6	–	6	–	0
No. 5 Nebraska	5	–	2	–	0	10	–	2	–	0
Oklahoma State	4	–	3	–	0	6	–	5	–	0
Iowa State	3	–	4	–	0	6	–	5	–	0
Missouri	2	–	5	–	0	3	–	8	–	0
Kansas State	1	–	6	–	0	2	–	9	–	0
Kansas	0	–	7	–	0	3	–	8	–	0
$ – Conference champion; Rankings from AP Poll

1986 Big Ten Conference football standings
	Conf.					Overall
Team	W		L		T	W		L		T
No. 8 Michigan +	7	–	1	–	0	11	–	2	–	0
No. 7 Ohio State +	7	–	1	–	0	10	–	3	–	0
No. 16 Iowa	5	–	3	–	0	9	–	3	–	0
Minnesota	5	–	3	–	0	6	–	6	–	0
Michigan State	4	–	4	–	0	6	–	5	–	0
Indiana	3	–	5	–	0	6	–	6	–	0
Illinois	3	–	5	–	0	4	–	7	–	0
Northwestern	2	–	6	–	0	4	–	7	–	0
Purdue	2	–	6	–	0	3	–	8	–	0
Wisconsin	2	–	6	–	0	3	–	9	–	0
+ – Conference co-champions; Rankings from AP Poll

1986 Mid-American Conference football standings
	Conf.					Overall
Team	W		L		T	W		L		T
Miami (OH) $	6	–	2	–	0	8	–	4	–	0
Toledo	5	–	3	–	0	7	–	4	–	0
Bowling Green	5	–	3	–	0	5	–	6	–	0
Kent State	5	–	3	–	0	5	–	6	–	0
Ball State	4	–	4	–	0	6	–	5	–	0
Eastern Michigan	4	–	4	–	0	6	–	5	–	0
Central Michigan	4	–	4	–	0	5	–	5	–	0
Western Michigan	3	–	5	–	0	3	–	8	–	0
Ohio	0	–	8	–	0	1	–	10	–	0
$ – Conference champion

1986 Pacific Coast Athletic Association football standings
	Conf.					Overall
Team	W		L		T	W		L		T
San Jose State $	7	–	0	–	0	10	–	2	–	0
Fresno State	6	–	1	–	0	9	–	2	–	0
Long Beach State	4	–	3	–	0	6	–	5	–	0
UNLV	3	–	4	–	0	6	–	5	–	0
Utah State	3	–	4	–	0	3	–	8	–	0
Pacific (CA)	2	–	5	–	0	4	–	7	–	0
Cal State Fullerton	2	–	5	–	0	3	–	9	–	0
New Mexico State	1	–	6	–	0	1	–	10	–	0
$ – Conference champion

1986 Pacific-10 Conference football standings
	Conf.					Overall
Team	W		L		T	W		L		T
No. 4 Arizona State $	5	–	1	–	1	10	–	1	–	1
No. 14 UCLA	5	–	2	–	1	8	–	3	–	1
No. 18 Washington	5	–	2	–	1	8	–	3	–	1
No. 11 Arizona	5	–	3	–	0	9	–	3	–	0
Stanford	5	–	3	–	0	8	–	4	–	0
USC	5	–	3	–	0	7	–	5	–	0
Oregon	3	–	5	–	0	5	–	6	–	0
Washington State	2	–	6	–	1	3	–	7	–	1
California	2	–	7	–	0	2	–	9	–	0
Oregon State	1	–	6	–	0	3	–	8	–	0
$ – Conference champion; Rankings from AP Poll

1986 Southeastern Conference football standings
	Conf.					Overall
Team	W		L		T	W		L		T
No. 10 LSU $	5	–	1	–	0	9	–	3	–	0
No. 6 Auburn	4	–	2	–	0	10	–	2	–	0
No. 9 Alabama	4	–	2	–	0	10	–	3	–	0
Georgia	4	–	2	–	0	8	–	4	–	0
Ole Miss	4	–	2	–	0	8	–	3	–	1
Tennessee	3	–	3	–	0	7	–	5	–	0
Mississippi State	2	–	4	–	0	6	–	5	–	0
Kentucky	2	–	4	–	0	5	–	5	–	1
Florida	2	–	4	–	0	6	–	5	–	0
Vanderbilt	0	–	6	–	0	1	–	10	–	0
$ – Conference champion; Rankings from AP Poll

1986 Southwest Conference football standings
	Conf.					Overall
Team	W		L		T	W		L		T
No. 13 Texas A&M $	7	–	1	–	0	9	–	3	–	0
No. 15 Arkansas	6	–	2	–	0	9	–	3	–	0
No. 12 Baylor	6	–	2	–	0	9	–	3	–	0
Texas Tech	5	–	3	–	0	7	–	5	–	0
SMU	5	–	3	–	0	6	–	5	–	0
Texas	4	–	4	–	0	5	–	6	–	0
Rice	2	–	6	–	0	4	–	7	–	0
TCU	1	–	7	–	0	3	–	8	–	0
Houston	0	–	8	–	0	1	–	10	–	0
$ – Conference champion; Rankings from AP Poll

1986 Western Athletic Conference football standings
	Conf.					Overall
Team	W		L		T	W		L		T
San Diego State $	7	–	1	–	0	8	–	4	–	0
BYU	6	–	2	–	0	8	–	5	–	0
Air Force	5	–	2	–	0	6	–	5	–	0
Hawaii	4	–	4	–	0	7	–	5	–	0
Colorado State	4	–	4	–	0	6	–	5	–	0
Wyoming	4	–	4	–	0	6	–	6	–	0
New Mexico	2	–	5	–	0	4	–	8	–	0
UTEP	2	–	6	–	0	4	–	8	–	0
Utah	1	–	7	–	0	2	–	9	–	0
$ – Conference champion

1986 NCAA Division I-A independents football records
	Conf.					Overall
Team	W		L		T	W		L		T
No. 1 Penn State		–		–		12	–	0	–	0
No. 2 Miami (FL)		–		–		11	–	1	–	0
No. 20 Virginia Tech		–		–		9	–	2	–	1
No. 19 Boston College		–		–		9	–	3	–	0
Tulsa		–		–		7	–	4	–	0
Florida State		–		–		7	–	4	–	1
Army		–		–		6	–	5	–	0
Southwestern Louisiana		–		–		6	–	5	–	0
Southern Miss		–		–		6	–	5	–	0
Temple		–		–		6	–	5	–	0
Pittsburgh		–		–		5	–	5	–	1
Rutgers		–		–		5	–	5	–	1
Cincinnati		–		–		5	–	6	–	0
Notre Dame		–		–		5	–	6	–	0
Syracuse		–		–		5	–	6	–	0
South Carolina		–		–		3	–	6	–	2
Tulane		–		–		4	–	7	–	0
West Virginia		–		–		4	–	7	–	0
Louisville		–		–		3	–	8	–	0
Navy		–		–		3	–	8	–	0
Wichita State		–		–		3	–	8	–	0
East Carolina		–		–		2	–	9	–	0
Northern Illinois		–		–		2	–	9	–	0
Memphis State		–		–		1	–	10	–	0
Rankings from AP Poll

== I-AA team wins over I-A teams ==
Italics denotes I-AA teams.

Date	Visiting team	Home team	Site	Result	Attendance	Ref.
August 30	No. 11 (I-AA) Louisiana Tech	Tulsa	Skelly Stadium • Tulsa, Oklahoma	22–17	25,667	
August 30	Cal State Fullerton	No. 2 (I-AA) Nevada	Mackay Stadium • Reno, Nevada	3–49	13,062	
September 13	Akron	Kent State	Dix Stadium • Kent, Ohio (Wagon Wheel)	17–7	19,000	
September 13	No. 7 (I-AA) Arkansas State	Memphis State	Liberty Bowl Memorial Stadium • Memphis, Tennessee (Paint Bucket Bowl)	30–10	36,510	
September 13	Marshall	Ohio	Peden Stadium • Athens, Ohio (Battle for the Bell)	21–7	16,400	
September 13	Northern Iowa	Kansas State	KSU Stadium • Manhattan, Kansas	17–0	28,820	
September 20	Cal State Fullerton	Idaho	Kibbie Dome • Moscow, Idaho	17–25	12,500	
September 20	Morehead State	Wichita State	Cessna Stadium • Wichita, Kansas	36–35	13,252	
September 20	Southwest Texas State	Rice	Rice Stadium • Houston, Texas	31–6	10,000	
September 27	Western Illinois	Northern Illinois	Huskie Stadium • DeKalb, Illinois	10–0	26,364	
October 18	Holy Cross	Army	Michie Stadium • West Point, New York	17–14	40,884	
October 18	North Texas State	TCU	Amon G. Carter Stadium • Fort Worth, Texas	24–20	16,021	
October 18	No. 17 (I-AA) Penn	Navy	Navy–Marine Corps Memorial Stadium • Annapolis, Maryland	30–26	23,959	
November 1	No. 10 (I-AA) William & Mary	Virginia	Scott Stadium • Charlottesville, Virginia	41–37	35,100	
November 8	Illinois State	Wichita State	Cessna Stadium • Wichita, Kansas	17–10	4,233	
November 15	No. 12 (I-AA) Delaware	Navy	Navy–Marine Corps Memorial Stadium • Annapolis, Maryland	27–14	30,089	
^{#}Rankings from AP Poll released prior to game.

- Note:
  - Arkansas State at Ole Miss tied 10–10.
  - Furman at Georgia Tech tied 17–17.

== Regular season ==
=== September ===
Defending champion Oklahoma was No. 1 in the preseason AP Poll, followed by No. 2 Michigan, No. 3 Miami, No. 4 UCLA, and No. 5 Alabama. Alabama beat No. 9 Ohio State 16–10 in the Kickoff Classic on August 27 and Miami won 34–14 at South Carolina on August 30, but no new poll was taken the following week.

September 6: No. 1 Oklahoma hosted No. 4 UCLA and overwhelmed the Bruins 38–3. No. 2 Michigan had not begun its season. No. 3 Miami won 23–15 at Florida, No. 5 Alabama defeated Vanderbilt 42–10, and No. 6 Penn State beat Temple 45–15. The next AP Poll featured No. 1 Oklahoma, No. 2 Miami, No. 3 Michigan, No. 4 Alabama, and No. 5 Penn State.

September 13: No. 1 Oklahoma and No. 5 Penn State were idle. No. 2 Miami dominated Texas Tech 61–11, No. 3 Michigan won 24–23 at Notre Dame in Lou Holtz's first game as the Fighting Irish head coach, and No. 4 Alabama beat Southern Mississippi 31–17. The top five remained the same in the next poll.

September 20: No. 1 Oklahoma had its second consecutive blowout win, 63–0 over Minnesota. No. 2 Miami was idle. No. 3 Michigan beat Oregon State 31–12, but still slipped a few spots in the next poll. No. 4 Alabama won 21–7 at No. 13 Florida. No. 5 Penn State also fell to a lower ranking despite a win (26–14 at Boston College). No. 6 Nebraska, which defeated Illinois 59–14, moved into the top five: No. 1 Oklahoma, No. 2 Miami, No. 3 Alabama, No. 4 Nebraska, and No. 5 Michigan.

September 27: In a highly anticipated matchup, No. 1 Oklahoma faced off against No. 2 Miami, the only team which had defeated them in 1985. The Sooners were no luckier this year than last, as Vinny Testaverde led the Hurricanes to a 28–16 victory. This was a major blow for the Sooners, who would finish the 1986 season ranked first in all four major defensive statistical categories – a feat not to be duplicated until 2012, by Alabama – but remained stuck behind Miami in the polls for the rest of the year. No. 3 Alabama was idle. No. 4 Nebraska beat Oregon 48–14, No. 5 Michigan squeaked past No. 20 Florida State 20–18, and No. 6 Penn State won 42–17 over East Carolina. The top five in the next poll was No. 1 Miami, No. 2 Alabama, No. 3 Nebraska, No. 4 Michigan, and No. 5 Penn State.

=== October ===
October 4: No. 1 Miami shut out Northern Illinois 34–0, No. 2 Alabama beat Notre Dame 28–10, No. 3 Nebraska won 27–24 in a back-and-forth game at South Carolina, No. 4 Michigan defeated Wisconsin 34–17, and No. 5 Penn State beat Rutgers 31–6. The top five remained the same in the next poll.

October 11: No. 1 Miami won 58–14 at West Virginia, No. 2 Alabama blanked Memphis 37–0, No. 3 Nebraska beat Oklahoma State 30–10, and No. 4 Michigan defeated Michigan State 27–6. No. 5 Penn State needed a late comeback to beat Cincinnati 23–17, and No. 6 Oklahoma, which bounced back with a 47–12 victory over Texas, moved ahead of the Nittany Lions in the next poll: No. 1 Miami, No. 2 Alabama, No. 3 Nebraska, No. 4 Michigan, and No. 5 Oklahoma.

October 18: No. 1 Miami won 45–13 at Cincinnati, No. 2 Alabama defeated Tennessee 56–28, and No. 3 Nebraska beat Missouri 48–17. A No. 1 vs No. 2 matchup the previous season between Iowa and Michigan had decided the race for the 1986 Rose Bowl; in the 1986 rematch, the No. 4-ranked Wolverines got revenge on the No. 8-ranked Hawkeyes with a 20–17 win. No. 5 Oklahoma shut out Oklahoma State 19–0, and the top five remained the same in the next poll.

October 25: No. 1 Miami was idle, while No. 6 Penn State defeated No. 2 Alabama 23–3 in Tuscaloosa. The Hurricanes and the Nittany Lions both played relatively weak schedules with the exceptions of powerhouses Oklahoma and Alabama, and their upset victories bolstered their national championship aspirations. No. 3 Nebraska fell 20–10 at Colorado. No. 4 Michigan won 38–14 at Indiana. No. 5 Oklahoma achieved their second consecutive shutout, 38–0 at Iowa State, and No. 7 Auburn beat No. 13 Mississippi State 35–6. The top five in the next poll were No. 1 Miami, No. 2 Penn State, No. 3 Michigan, No. 4 Oklahoma, and No. 5 Auburn.

=== November ===
November 1: The top four teams all won easily. No. 1 Miami defeated No. 20 Florida State 41–23, No. 2 Penn State shut out West Virginia 19–0, No. 3 Michigan overwhelmed Illinois 69–13, and No. 4 Oklahoma crushed Kansas 64–3. However, No. 5 Auburn blew a 17–0 lead in an 18–17 loss at Florida. No. 6 Washington matched up against No. 7 Arizona State, and the Sun Devils won 34–21 to take over first place in the Pac-10. They had already beaten both USC and UCLA in Los Angeles, the first Pacific-10 conference team to do so in the same year. The top five in the next poll were No. 1 Miami, No. 2 Penn State, No. 3 Michigan, No. 4 Oklahoma, and No. 5 Arizona State.

November 8: No. 1 Miami won 37–10 at Pittsburgh. No. 2 Penn State barely got past Maryland 17–15, with the Terrapins falling short on a last-minute two-point conversion attempt. The AP voters were more impressed by No. 3 Michigan's 31–7 victory at Purdue, and the Wolverines moved up in the next poll. No. 4 Oklahoma and No. 5 Arizona State won in lopsided shutouts, 77–0 over Missouri and 49–0 over California. (This was the latest episode in a difficult year for Cal coach Joe Kapp, who had unzipped his pants in front of the Seattle media following an embarrassing 50–18 loss against Washington in October and would be fired after the season.) The Sun Devils’ victory allowed them to clinch the Pac-10 title and a Rose Bowl berth. The next poll featured No. 1 Miami, No. 2 Michigan, No. 3 Penn State, No. 4 Oklahoma, and No. 5 Arizona State.

November 15: No. 1 Miami beat Tulsa 23–10. Minnesota was a 25–point underdog in a road game against No. 2 Michigan; the Gophers had not defeated the Wolverines since 1977. Nevertheless, Michigan trailed in the fourth quarter and scored a touchdown to tie the game at 17 with only two minutes to go. On the ensuing Minnesota possession, quarterback Rickey Foggie scrambled to put Chip Lohmiller in field goal position; Lohmiller connected for a 20–17 Gophers victory. No. 3 Penn State had another close one, stopping Notre Dame 24–19 after the Irish had driven to the Lions’ 6-yard line with a minute left. No. 4 Oklahoma blanked Colorado 28–0; the Sooners had outscored their last five opponents 226–3. No. 5 Arizona State defeated Wichita State 52–6, and No. 6 Nebraska overwhelmed Kansas 70–0. The next poll featured No. 1 Miami, No. 2 Penn State, No. 3 Oklahoma, No. 4 Arizona State, and No. 5 Nebraska.

November 22: No. 1 Miami was idle. No. 2 Penn State finished an undefeated regular season with a 34–14 victory over Pittsburgh. No. 3 Oklahoma and No. 5 Nebraska met in Lincoln to decide the Big 8 title and an Orange Bowl berth. The Sooners entered the fourth quarter trailing by ten points, but came back to win 20–17 on a field goal with time running out. No. 4 Arizona State lost 34–17 at Arizona. No. 6 Michigan and No. 7 Ohio State, both undefeated in Big Ten play, met to determine who would be the Sun Devils’ Rose Bowl opponent. Quarterback Jim Harbaugh guaranteed a Michigan victory: "We don't care where we play the game. I hate to say it, but we could play it in the parking lot. We could play the game at 12 noon or midnight. We're going to be jacked up." This game also was decided by a late field goal, but this time it was an Ohio State miss which gave Michigan a 26–24 victory. No. 8 LSU, who had already clinched the SEC title and a Sugar Bowl berth, defeated Notre Dame 21–19. The next poll featured No. 1 Miami, No. 2 Penn State, No. 3 Oklahoma, No. 4 Michigan, and No. 5 LSU.

November 27–29: No. 2 Penn State, No. 3 Oklahoma, and No. 4 Michigan had finished their seasons. No. 1 Miami finished undefeated with a 36–10 win over East Carolina, and No. 5 LSU completed their schedule by defeating Tulane 37–17. The last remaining major conference race was also decided this week, as No. 10 Texas A&M clinched the SWC title and a Cotton Bowl berth with a 16–3 victory at Texas. The top five remained the same in the final poll of the regular season.

=== No. 1 and No. 2 Progress ===
WEEKS	No. 1	No. 2	Event	
PRE	Oklahoma	Michigan	Miami 23, Florida 15	Sep 6
1–3	Oklahoma	Miami	Miami 28, Oklahoma 16	Sep 27
4–7	Miami	Alabama	Penn State 23, Alabama 3	Oct 25
8–9	Miami	Penn State	Penn State 17, Maryland 15	Nov 8
10	Miami	Michigan	Minnesota 20, Michigan 17	Nov 15
11–13	Miami	Penn State	Penn State 14, Miami 10	Jan 2

=== Notable rivalry games ===
- LSU 37, Tulane 17
- Michigan 24, Notre Dame 23
- Notre Dame 38, USC 37
- Oklahoma 20, Nebraska 17
- UCLA 45, USC 25
- Arkansas 21, Texas 14
- (4) Arizona State 17, (14) Arizona 34

Arkansas' victory over Texas was the Razorbacks' first win in Austin since 1966.

== Bowl games ==
With Arizona State having clinched the Rose Bowl berth on November 8, and the Fiesta Bowl and Citrus Bowl scrambling to bid for the No. 1 Miami (Florida) vs. No. 2 Penn State Game, the Cotton Bowl struck an agreement to take the loser of the Michigan-Ohio State game. All the bowl games attempted to line up participants before the official bids were extended on November 22. The Sugar Bowl agreed to take the loser of the Oklahoma-Nebraska game to match the SEC winner, and the Orange Bowl agreed to take the second place SWC team to match the Big 8 winner. The Citrus Bowl, which moved to January 1, got a second place SEC team in Auburn, and, what they hoped would be a good matchup, in 7–2 USC. The Trojans would lose to UCLA and Notre Dame after they were invited.

National championship:

- Fiesta Bowl: No. 2 Penn State 14, No. 1 Miami (FL) 10

New Year's Day bowls:

- Florida Citrus Bowl: No. 10 Auburn 16, USC 7
- Rose Bowl: No. 7 Arizona State 22, No. 4 Michigan 15
- Sugar Bowl: No. 6 Nebraska 30, No. 5 LSU 15
- Cotton Bowl: No. 11 Ohio State 28, No. 8 Texas A&M 12
- Orange Bowl: No. 3 Oklahoma 42, No. 9 Arkansas 8

Other bowls:

- Hall of Fame Bowl: Boston College 27, No. 17 Georgia 24
- Gator Bowl: Clemson 27, No. 20 Stanford 21
- Sun Bowl: No. 13 Alabama 28, No. 12 Washington 6
- Holiday Bowl: No. 19 Iowa 39, San Diego State 38
- Freedom Bowl: No. 15 UCLA 31, BYU 10
- Peach Bowl: Virginia Tech 25, No. 18 NC State 24
- All-American Bowl: Florida State 27, Indiana 13
- Liberty Bowl: Tennessee 21, Minnesota 14
- Aloha Bowl: No. 16 Arizona 30, North Carolina 21
- Independence Bowl: Mississippi 20, Texas Tech 17
- California Bowl: San Jose State 37, Miami (Ohio) 7
- Bluebonnet Bowl: No. 14 Baylor 21, Colorado 9

== Polls ==
=== Final AP Poll ===
1. Penn State
2. Miami (FL)
3. Oklahoma
4. Arizona State
5. Nebraska
6. Auburn
7. Ohio State
8. Michigan
9. Alabama
10. LSU
11. Arizona
12. Baylor
13. Texas A&M
14. UCLA
15. Arkansas
16. Iowa
17. Clemson
18. Washington
19. Boston College
20. Virginia Tech

=== Final Coaches Poll ===
1. Penn State
2. Miami (FL)
3. Oklahoma
4. Nebraska
5. Arizona St.
6. Ohio St.
7. Michigan
8. Auburn
9. Alabama
10. Arizona
11. LSU
12. Texas A&M
13. Baylor
14. UCLA
15. Iowa
16. Arkansas
17. Washington
18. Boston College
19. Clemson
20. Florida St.

== Awards ==
=== Heisman Trophy voting ===
The Heisman Trophy is given to the year's most outstanding player

Player	School	Position	1st	2nd	3rd	Total
Vinny Testaverde	Miami (FL)	QB	678	76	27	2,213
Paul Palmer	Temple	RB	28	207	174	672
Jim Harbaugh	Michigan	QB	25	136	111	458
Brian Bosworth	Oklahoma	LB	9	136	96	395
Gordie Lockbaum	Holy Cross	RB	32	39	68	242
Brent Fullwood	Auburn	RB	4	45	27	129
Cornelius Bennett	Alabama	LB	3	29	29	96
D. J. Dozier	Penn State	RB	0	23	31	77
Kevin Sweeney	Fresno State	QB	6	16	23	73
Chris Spielman	Ohio State	LB	5	9	27	60

=== Other major awards ===
- Maxwell (Player):Vinny Testaverde, Miami (Fl)
- Camp (Back): Vinny Testaverde, Miami (Fl)
- O'Brein Award (QB): Vinny Testaverde, Miami (Fl)
- Rockne (Lineman): N/A
- Lombardi (Defensive Front Seven): Cornelius Bennett, Alabama
- Butkus (Linebacker): Brian Bosworth, Oklahoma
- Outland (Interior): Jason Buck, BYU
- Coach of the Year: Joe Paterno, Penn State

== Attendances ==
Average home attendance top 10:

Rank	Team	Average
1	Michigan Wolverines	105,210
2	Tennessee Volunteers	91,902
3	Ohio State Buckeyes	89,368
4	Penn State Nittany Lions	85,100
5	Georgia Bulldogs	79,596
6	Clemson Tigers	79,400
7	LSU Tigers	78,067
8	Nebraska Cornhuskers	76,031
9	Florida Gators	75,455
10	Oklahoma Sooners	75,083
