= 1987 Orange Bowl =

- 53rd Orange Bowl
- The Miami Orange Bowl in Miami, Florida, hosted the Orange Bowl.
Arkansas Razorbacks	Oklahoma Sooners
(9–2)	(10–1)
SWC	Big Eight
8	42
Head coach: Ken Hatfield	Head coach: Barry Switzer
AP / Coaches; 9 / 10	AP / Coaches; 3 / 3
	1	2	3	4	Total
Arkansas	0	0	0	8	8
Oklahoma	0	14	14	14	42
- Date: January 1, 1987
- Season: 1986
- Stadium: Orange Bowl
- Location: Miami, Florida
- MVP: Spencer Tillman (Oklahoma HB); Dante Jones (Oklahoma LB)
- Favorite: Oklahoma by 17 points
- Referee: Paul Schmitt (Independent)
- Attendance: 52,717

United States TV coverage
- Network: NBC
- Announcers: Don Criqui, Bob Trumpy, and Paul Maguire
- Nielsen ratings: 16.0

The 1987 Orange Bowl was the 53rd edition of the college football bowl game, played at the Orange Bowl in Miami, Florida, on Thursday, January 1. Part of the 1986–87 bowl game season, it matched the ninth-ranked Arkansas Razorbacks of the Southwest Conference (SWC) and the #3 Oklahoma Sooners of the Big Eight Conference. Heavily favored Oklahoma won 42–8.

== Teams ==
=== Arkansas ===
The Razorbacks lost twice, to Texas Tech and Baylor. This was Arkansas' first Orange Bowl appearance in nine years; that 1978 game was a 31–6 upset rout of Oklahoma.

=== Oklahoma ===
The Sooners won the Big Eight Conference title for the third straight year and appeared in a third consecutive Orange Bowl. Only a 28–16 loss at Miami in late September cost them a shot at a second straight title. Standout linebacker Brian Bosworth was suspended for this game after testing positive for steroids. Bosworth came out with the Oklahoma team captains for the pregame coin toss, but was told by the officials he couldn't participate and was ordered back to the sidelines. As he walked back, the Oklahoma students in attendance stood and cheered in support.

== Game summary ==
The game followed the Rose Bowl on NBC, and kicked off around 8:30 p.m. EST; it was the sole game in that time slot, as the Sugar Bowl was played earlier in the day on ABC.

Following a scoreless first quarter, Spencer Tillman gave Oklahoma the lead in the second quarter with two touchdown runs, the latter occurring after an Arkansas turnover, and it was 14–0 at halftime. Quarterback Jamelle Holieway added his own two touchdown runs to make it 28–0 after three quarters. Arkansas threw five interceptions, as Anthony Stafford and Duncan Parham added touchdown runs of their own to make it 42–0 for Oklahoma. In the final half-minute, Arkansas scored on a one-yard touchdown run by fullback Derrick Thomas (and a two-point conversion) to avoid a shutout.

=== Scoring ===
First quarter
No scoring
Second quarter

- Oklahoma – Spencer Tillman 77-yard run (Tim Lashar kick)
- Oklahoma – Tillman 21-yard run (Lashar kick)

Third quarter

- Oklahoma – Jamelle Holieway 2-yard run (Lashar kick)
- Oklahoma – Holieway 4-yard run (Lashar kick)

Fourth quarter

- Oklahoma – Anthony Stafford 13-yard run (Lashar kick)
- Oklahoma – Duncan Parham 49-yard run (Lashar kick)
- Arkansas – Derrick Thomas 1-yard run (James Shibest pass from John Bland)

== Statistics ==
Statistics	Arkansas	Oklahoma
First downs	17	11
Rushes–yards	45–48	48–366
Passing yards	192	47
Passes (C–A–I)	16–33–5	2–5–0
Total offense	78–240	53–413
Return yards	18	58
Punts–average	9–41	5–47
Fumbles–lost	2–0	3–2
Turnovers	5	2
Penalties–yards	3–25	4–40
Time of possession	35:29	24:31

== Aftermath ==
While on the sidelines, Bosworth displayed a shirt referring to the NCAA as "National Communists Against Athletes." After this game, he was dismissed from the team, and later declared himself eligible for the NFL supplemental draft in June, where he was selected by the Seattle Seahawks.

In the final AP poll, Oklahoma remained at third and Arkansas fell to fifteenth.

Oklahoma returned to the Orange Bowl the next year for a fourth consecutive appearance, but through 2026, Arkansas has not been back.

The Sooners and Razorbacks next met in the Cotton Bowl following the 2001 season, with Oklahoma winning 10-3. By that time, Arkansas was a member of the Southeastern Conference and Oklahoma a member of the Big 12; the Southwest Conference ceased to exist after the 1995 football season, with four members joining the Big 8 schools to form the Big 12.

In 2024, Oklahoma and Arkansas will be in the same conference for the first time since 1924 when the Sooners join the SEC. However, the teams are not scheduled to play in 2024 or 2025.
