= 1986 Sam Houston State Bearkats football team =

American college football season

1986 Sam Houston State Bearkats football

Gulf Star champion

NCAA Division I-AA First Round, L 7–48 vs. Arkansas State
- Conference: Gulf Star Conference
- Record: 9–3 (3–1 GSC)
- Head coach: Ron Randleman (5th season)
- Home stadium: Bowers Stadium

1986 Gulf Star Conference football standings
| | Conf. | | | | | Overall |
| Team | W | | L | | T | W | | L | | T |
|---|---|---|---|---|---|---|---|---|---|---|
| No. 11 Sam Houston State $^ | 3 | – | 1 | – | 0 | 8 | – | 3 | – | 0 |
| No. 12 Nicholls State ^ | 2 | – | 2 | – | 0 | 10 | – | 3 | – | 0 |
| Northwestern State | 2 | – | 2 | – | 0 | 5 | – | 5 | – | 1 |
| Southwest Texas State | 2 | – | 2 | – | 0 | 4 | – | 7 | – | 0 |
| Stephen F. Austin | 1 | – | 3 | – | 0 | 5 | – | 6 | – | 0 |
$ – Conference champion; ^ – NCAA Division I-AA playoff participant; Rankings from NCAA Division I-AA Football Committee poll

The 1986 Sam Houston State Bearkats football team represented Sam Houston State University as a member of the Gulf Star Conference (GSC) during the 1986 NCAA Division I-AA football season. Led by fifth-year head coach Ron Randleman, the Bearkats compiled an overall record of 9–3 with a mark of 3–1 in conference play, and finished as champion in the GSC. Sam Houston State advanced to the NCAA Division I-AA Football Championship playoffs, where they were defeated by Arkansas State in the first round.

== Schedule ==
| Date | Opponent | Rank | Site | Result | Attendance | Source |
|---|---|---|---|---|---|---|
| September 6 | at No. 2 Nevada* | | Mackay Stadium; Reno, NV | L 7–35 | 11,680 | |
| September 13 | Montana State* | | Bowers Stadium; Huntsville, TX | W 23–6 | 11,500 | |
| September 20 | Lamar* | | Bowers Stadium; Huntsville, TX | W 24–13 | 7,800 | |
| September 27 | Angelo State* | | Bowers Stadium; Huntsville, TX | W 38–21 | 7,300 | |
| October 4 | at Texas Southern* | | Robertson Stadium; Houston, TX | W 38–28 | | |
| October 11 | Central State (OK)* | | Bowers Stadium; Huntsville, TX | W 27–17 | | |
| October 18 | at Northwestern State | | Harry Turpin Stadium; Natchitoches, LA | L 23–31 | | |
| November 1 | at No. 4 Nicholls State | | John L. Guidry Stadium; Thibodaux, LA | W 41–38 | | |
| November 8 | Stephen F. Austin | | Bowers Stadium; Huntsville, TX (Battle of the Piney Woods) | W 30–26 | | |
| November 15 | at Western Illinois* | No. 15 | Hanson Field; Macomb, IL | W 16–13 | 4,628 | |
| November 22 | Southwest Texas State | No. 14 | Bowers Stadium; Huntsville, TX (rivalry) | W 32–31 | | |
| November 29 | at No. 2 Arkansas State* | No. 11 | Indian Stadium; Jonesboro, AR (NCAA Division I-AA First Round) | L 7–48 | 4,500 | |
*Non-conference game; Rankings from NCAA Division I-AA Football Committee Poll released prior to the game
