= 1986 Rice Owls football team =

American college football season

1986 Rice Owls football
- Conference: Southwest Conference
- Record: 4–7 (2–6 SWC)
- Head coach: Jerry Berndt (1st season)
- Home stadium: Rice Stadium

1986 Southwest Conference football standings
	Conf.					Overall
Team	W		L		T	W		L		T
No. 13 Texas A&M $	7	–	1	–	0	9	–	3	–	0
No. 15 Arkansas	6	–	2	–	0	9	–	3	–	0
No. 12 Baylor	6	–	2	–	0	9	–	3	–	0
Texas Tech	5	–	3	–	0	7	–	5	–	0
SMU	5	–	3	–	0	6	–	5	–	0
Texas	4	–	4	–	0	5	–	6	–	0
Rice	2	–	6	–	0	4	–	7	–	0
TCU	1	–	7	–	0	3	–	8	–	0
Houston	0	–	8	–	0	1	–	10	–	0
$ – Conference champion; Rankings from AP Poll

The 1986 Rice Owls football team was an American football team that represented Rice University in the Southwest Conference during the 1986 NCAA Division I-A football season. In their first year under head coach Jerry Berndt, the team compiled a 4–7 record.

== Schedule ==
Date	Opponent	Site	Result	Attendance	Source
September 6	Lamar*	Rice Stadium; Houston, TX	W 28–14	10,000	
September 13	SMU	Rice Stadium; Houston, TX (rivalry)	L 3–45	14,045	
September 27	Southwest Texas State*	Rice Stadium; Houston, TX	L 6–31	10,000	
October 4	Texas	Rice Stadium; Houston, TX (rivalry)	L 14–17	31,000	
October 11	at TCU	Amon G. Carter Stadium; Fort Worth, TX	W 37–31	21,092	
October 18	Texas Tech	Rice Stadium; Houston, TX	L 21–49	18,000	
October 25	at No. 10 Texas A&M	Kyle Field; College Station, TX	L 10–45	51,885	
November 1	at No. 13 Arkansas	Razorback Stadium; Fayetteville, AR	L 14–45	49,980	
November 15	No. 18 Baylor	Rice Stadium; Houston, TX	L 17–23	12,500	
November 22	Air Force*	Rice Stadium; Houston, TX	W 21–17	10,000	
November 29	at Houston	Houston Astrodome; Houston, TX (rivalry)	W 14–13	10,399	
*Non-conference game; Rankings from AP Poll released prior to the game
