= 1986 Montana Grizzlies football team =

American college football season

1986 Montana Grizzlies football
- Conference: Big Sky Conference
- Record: 6–4 (4–4 Big Sky)
- Head coach: Don Read (1st season)
- Offensive coordinator: Tommy Lee (1st season)
- Defensive coordinator: Bill Smith (1st season)
- Home stadium: Dornblaser Field; Washington–Grizzly Stadium

1986 Big Sky Conference football standings
	Conf.					Overall
Team	W		L		T	W		L		T
No. 1 Nevada $^	7	–	0	–	0	13	–	1	–	0
No. 16 Idaho ^	8	–	2	–	0	8	–	4	–	0
Northern Arizona	5	–	2	–	0	7	–	4	–	0
Montana *	4	–	4	–	0	6	–	4	–	0
Boise State	3	–	4	–	0	5	–	6	–	0
Weber State	2	–	5	–	0	3	–	8	–	0
Montana State	2	–	5	–	0	3	–	8	–	0
Idaho State *	1	–	7	–	0	2	–	9	–	0
$ – Conference champion; ^ – NCAA Division I-AA playoff participant; * – Montana and Idaho State played twice.; Rankings from NCAA Division I-AA Poll

The 1986 Montana Grizzlies football team represented the University of Montana in the 1986 NCAA Division I-AA football season as a member of the Big Sky Conference (Big Sky). The Grizzlies were led by first-year head coach Don Read, played their home games at Dornblaser Field and Washington–Grizzly Stadium, and finished the season with a record of six wins and four losses (6–4, 4–4 Big Sky).

== Schedule ==
Date	Time	Opponent	Site	Result	Attendance	Source
September 20		at No. 1 Nevada	Mackay Stadium; Reno, NV	L 17–51	12,450	
September 27		Northern Arizona	Dornblaser Field; Missoula, MT	L 28–34	6,333	
October 4		Eastern Washington*	Dornblaser Field; Missoula, MT (EWU–UM Governors Cup)	W 42–37	7,389	
October 11	7:00 p.m.	at Boise State	Bronco Stadium; Boise, ID	L 0–31	16,444	
October 18		Idaho State	Washington–Grizzly Stadium; Missoula, MT	W 38–31	10,580	
October 25		Montana State	Washington–Grizzly Stadium; Missoula, MT (rivalry)	W 59–28	13,362	
November 1	1:00 p.m.	Idaho	Washington–Grizzly Stadium; Missoula, MT (Little Brown Stein)	L 31–38	7,303	
November 8		at Weber State	Wildcat Stadium; Ogden, UT	W 55–29	2,190	
November 15		at Idaho State	ASISU MiniDome; Pocatello, ID	W 57–13	5,917	
November 22		at Portland State*	Civic Stadium; Portland, OR	W 35–14	4,808	
*Non-conference game; Rankings from NCAA Division I-AA Football Committee Poll released prior to the game; All times are in Mountain time
