= 1986 Lamar Cardinals football team =

American college football season

1986 Lamar Cardinals football
- Conference: Southland Conference
- Record: 2–9 (0–5 Southland)
- Head coach: Ray Alborn (1st season)
- Home stadium: Cardinal Stadium

1986 Southland Conference football standings
	Conf.					Overall
Team	W		L		T	W		L		T
No. 2 Arkansas State $^	5	–	0	–	0	12	–	2	–	1
North Texas State	3	–	2	–	0	6	–	4	–	0
Louisiana Tech	3	–	2	–	0	6	–	4	–	1
Northeast Louisiana	3	–	2	–	0	5	–	6	–	0
McNeese State	1	–	4	–	0	2	–	9	–	0
Lamar	0	–	5	–	0	2	–	9	–	0
$ – Conference champion; ^ – NCAA Division I-AA playoff participant; Rankings from NCAA Division I-AA Football Committee poll

The 1986 Lamar Cardinals football team represented Lamar University in the 1986 NCAA Division I-AA football season as a member of the Southland Conference. The Cardinals played their home games at Cardinal Stadium now named Provost Umphrey Stadium in Beaumont, Texas. Lamar finished the 1986 season with a 2–9 overall record and a 0–5 conference record. The season marked the first year with Ray Alborn as Lamar Cardinals head football coach. The 1986 season was also the Cardinals' last season as a member of the Southland Conference in football until the 2010 season. Lamar joined the non–football American South Conference as a charter member along with fellow SLC members, Louisiana Tech and Arkansas State and three other universities.

== Schedule ==
Date	Opponent	Site	Result	Attendance	Source
September 6	at Rice*	Rice Stadium; Houston, TX	L 14–28		
September 20	at San Houston State*	Bowers Stadium; Huntsville, TX	L 13–24	7,800	
September 27	at Stephen F. Austin*	Homer Bryce Stadium; Nacogdoches, TX	L 25–38		
October 4	No. 2 (D-II) Texas A&I*	Cardinal Stadium; Beaumont, TX	L 10–35		
October 11	at Northeast Louisiana	Malone Stadium; Monroe, LA	L 21–22		
October 18	Southwest Texas State*	Cardinal Stadium; Beaumont, TX	W 17–3		
October 25	North Texas State	Cardinal Stadium; Beaumont, TX	L 13–33	3,121	
November 1	Louisiana Tech	Cardinal Stadium; Beaumont, TX	L 20–39	3,225	
November 8	Central State (OK)*	Cardinal Stadium; Beaumont, TX	W 47–23		
November 15	at No. 2 Arkansas State	Indian Stadium; Jonesboro, AR	L 7–56		
November 23	at McNeese State	Cowboy Stadium; Lake Charles, LA (rivalry)	L 7–38		
*Non-conference game; Rankings from NCAA Division I-AA Football Committee Poll released prior to the game
