= 1986 Houston Cougars football team =

American college football season

1986 Houston Cougars football
- Conference: Southwest Conference
- Record: 1–10 (0–8 SWC)
- Head coach: Bill Yeoman (25th season)
- Defensive coordinator: Don Todd (15th season)
- Captain: Robby Brezina
- Home stadium: Houston Astrodome

1986 Southwest Conference football standings
	Conf.					Overall
Team	W		L		T	W		L		T
No. 13 Texas A&M $	7	–	1	–	0	9	–	3	–	0
No. 15 Arkansas	6	–	2	–	0	9	–	3	–	0
No. 12 Baylor	6	–	2	–	0	9	–	3	–	0
Texas Tech	5	–	3	–	0	7	–	5	–	0
SMU	5	–	3	–	0	6	–	5	–	0
Texas	4	–	4	–	0	5	–	6	–	0
Rice	2	–	6	–	0	4	–	7	–	0
TCU	1	–	7	–	0	3	–	8	–	0
Houston	0	–	8	–	0	1	–	10	–	0
$ – Conference champion; Rankings from AP Poll

The 1986 Houston Cougars football team represented the University of Houston during the 1986 NCAA Division I-A football season. The Cougars were led by 25th-year head coach Bill Yeoman and played their home games at the Astrodome in Houston, Texas. The team competed as members of the Southwest Conference, finishing in last. Following a dismal 1–10 season, and amidst mounting controversy surrounding alleged NCAA rule violations, Bill Yeoman resigned as head coach. He retired as Houston's longest serving and winningest coach by wide margins.

== Schedule ==
Date	Opponent	Site	TV	Result	Attendance	Source
September 6	at Arizona*	Arizona Stadium; Tucson, AZ		L 3–37	50,593	
September 20	at Oklahoma State*	Lewis Field; Stillwater, OK		W 28–12	38,600	
September 27	Tulsa*	Houston Astrodome; Houston, TX		L 14–24	12,445	
October 4	at No. 13 Baylor	Baylor Stadium; Waco, TX (rivalry)	ESPN	L 13–27	34,000	
October 11	No. 14 Texas A&M	Houston Astrodome; Houston, TX		L 7–19	28,277	
October 18	at No. 20 SMU	Texas Stadium; Irving, TX (rivalry)		L 3–10	25,967	
October 25	No. 14 Arkansas^{†}	Houston Astrodome; Houston, TX		L 13–30	16,060	
November 1	TCU	Houston Astrodome; Houston, TX		L 14–30	10,125	
November 8	at Texas	Texas Memorial Stadium; Austin, TX		L 10–30	60,650	
November 22	at Texas Tech	Jones Stadium; Lubbock, TX (rivalry)		L 7–34	30,196	
November 29	Rice	Houston Astrodome; Houston, TX (rivalry)	Raycom	L 13–14	10,399	
*Non-conference game; ^{†}Homecoming; Rankings from AP Poll released prior to the game
