= 1986 Northern Arizona Lumberjacks football team =

American college football season

1986 Northern Arizona Lumberjacks football
- Conference: Big Sky Conference
- Record: 7–4 (5–2 Big Sky)
- Head coach: Larry Kentera (2nd season)
- Home stadium: Walkup Skydome

1986 Big Sky Conference football standings
	Conf.					Overall
Team	W		L		T	W		L		T
No. 1 Nevada $^	7	–	0	–	0	13	–	1	–	0
No. 16 Idaho ^	8	–	2	–	0	8	–	4	–	0
Northern Arizona	5	–	2	–	0	7	–	4	–	0
Montana *	4	–	4	–	0	6	–	4	–	0
Boise State	3	–	4	–	0	5	–	6	–	0
Weber State	2	–	5	–	0	3	–	8	–	0
Montana State	2	–	5	–	0	3	–	8	–	0
Idaho State *	1	–	7	–	0	2	–	9	–	0
$ – Conference champion; ^ – NCAA Division I-AA playoff participant; * – Montana and Idaho State played twice.; Rankings from NCAA Division I-AA Poll

The 1986 Northern Arizona Lumberjacks football team represented Northern Arizona University as a member of the Big Sky Conference during the 1986 NCAA Division I-AA football season. Led by second-year head coach Larry Kentera, the Lumberjacks compiled an overall record of 7–4, with a mark of 5–2 in conference play, and finished tied for second in the Big Sky.

== Schedule ==
Date	Opponent	Site	Result	Attendance	Source
August 30	Southern Utah*	Walkup Skydome; Flagstaff, AZ	L 17–27		
September 6	Angelo State*	Walkup Skydome; Flagstaff, AZ	W 24–13	8,000	
September 13	No. 8 Eastern Washington*	Walkup Skydome; Flagstaff, AZ	L 6–28	6,954	
September 20	Weber State	Walkup Skydome; Flagstaff, AZ	W 45–24	7,422	
September 27	at Montana	Dornblaser Field; Missoula, MT	W 34–28	6,333	
October 11	Southwest Texas State*^{†}	Walkup Skydome; Flagstaff, AZ	W 39–0	13,331	
October 18	at Montana State	Reno H. Sales Stadium; Bozeman, MT	L 19–27	10,497	
October 25	at No. 15 Idaho	Kibbie Dome; Moscow, ID	W 24–0	10,600	
November 1	Boise State	Walkup Skydome; Flagstaff, AZ	W 17–14	9,488	
November 8	Idaho State	Walkup Skydome; Flagstaff, AZ	W 31–17	6,686	
November 15	at No. 1 Nevada	Mackay Stadium; Reno, NV	L 17–27	15,425	
*Non-conference game; ^{†}Homecoming; Rankings from NCAA Division I-AA Football Committee Poll released prior to the game
