= 1986 Northeast Louisiana Indians football team =

American college football season

1986 Northeast Louisiana Indians football
- Conference: Southland Conference
- Record: 5–6 (3–2 SLC)
- Head coach: Pat Collins (6th season)
- Offensive coordinator: Rickey Bustle (1st season)
- Home stadium: Malone Stadium

1986 Southland Conference football standings
| | Conf. | | | | | Overall |
| Team | W | | L | | T | W | | L | | T |
|---|---|---|---|---|---|---|---|---|---|---|
| No. 2 Arkansas State $^ | 5 | – | 0 | – | 0 | 12 | – | 2 | – | 1 |
| North Texas State | 3 | – | 2 | – | 0 | 6 | – | 4 | – | 0 |
| Louisiana Tech | 3 | – | 2 | – | 0 | 6 | – | 4 | – | 1 |
| Northeast Louisiana | 3 | – | 2 | – | 0 | 5 | – | 6 | – | 0 |
| McNeese State | 1 | – | 4 | – | 0 | 2 | – | 9 | – | 0 |
| Lamar | 0 | – | 5 | – | 0 | 2 | – | 9 | – | 0 |
$ – Conference champion; ^ – NCAA Division I-AA playoff participant; Rankings from NCAA Division I-AA Football Committee poll

The 1986 Northeast Louisiana Indians football team was an American football team that represented Northeast Louisiana University (now known as the University of Louisiana at Monroe) as part of the Southland Conference during the 1986 NCAA Division I-AA football season. In their sixth year under head coach Pat Collins, the team compiled a 5–6 record.

== Schedule ==
| Date | Opponent | Site | Result | Attendance | Source |
|---|---|---|---|---|---|
| September 6 | at Southern Miss* | M. M. Roberts Stadium; Hattiesburg, MS | L 19–28 | 21,364 | |
| September 13 | at Southwestern Louisiana* | Cajun Field; Lafayette, LA | L 20–24 | | |
| September 20 | Southwest Texas State* | Malone Stadium; Monroe, LA | W 17–14 | | |
| September 27 | at Nicholls State* | John L. Guidry Stadium; Thibodaux, LA | L 13–17 | | |
| October 4 | Northwestern State* | Malone Stadium; Monroe, LA (rivalry) | L 14–17 | | |
| October 11 | Lamar | Malone Stadium; Monroe, LA | W 22–21 | | |
| October 18 | at McNeese State | Cowboy Stadium; Lake Charles, LA | W 37–17 | 14,000 | |
| November 1 | Stephen F. Austin* | Malone Stadium; Monroe, LA | W 28–7 | 15,238 | |
| November 8 | Louisiana Tech | Malone Stadium; Monroe, LA (rivalry) | W 20–6 | 20,381 | |
| November 15 | at North Texas State | Fouts Field; Denton, TX | L 20–28 | 6,420 | |
| November 22 | at Arkansas State | Indian Stadium; Jonesboro, AR | L 21–26 | 10,086 | |
*Non-conference game
