= 1986 SMU Mustangs football team =

American college football season

1986 SMU Mustangs football
- Conference: Southwest Conference
- Record: 6–5 (5–3 SWC)
- Head coach: Bobby Collins (5th season)
- Offensive scheme: No-huddle option
- Defensive coordinator: Bill Clay (5th season)
- Base defense: 3–4
- Home stadium: Texas Stadium

1986 Southwest Conference football standings
	Conf.					Overall
Team	W		L		T	W		L		T
No. 13 Texas A&M $	7	–	1	–	0	9	–	3	–	0
No. 15 Arkansas	6	–	2	–	0	9	–	3	–	0
No. 12 Baylor	6	–	2	–	0	9	–	3	–	0
Texas Tech	5	–	3	–	0	7	–	5	–	0
SMU	5	–	3	–	0	6	–	5	–	0
Texas	4	–	4	–	0	5	–	6	–	0
Rice	2	–	6	–	0	4	–	7	–	0
TCU	1	–	7	–	0	3	–	8	–	0
Houston	0	–	8	–	0	1	–	10	–	0
$ – Conference champion; Rankings from AP Poll

The 1986 SMU Mustangs football team represented Southern Methodist University (SMU) as a member of the Southwest Conference (SWC) during the 1986 NCAA Division I-A football season. Led by Bobby Collins in his fifth season as head coach, the Mustangs compiled an overall record 6–5 with a mark of 5–3 in conference play, tying for fourth place in the SWC.

After the season, SMU was sanctioned by the NCAA for repeated major rules violations. Since the most recent round of violations occurred after an NCAA rule involving punishing repeat offenders was instituted, the football program was not only hit with even harsher sanctions, but was also suspended from competition for the following season; the effects of the sanctions would eventually lead SMU to miss an additional season and resume play in 1989 under head coach Forrest Gregg, who was hired after Collins resigned in the aftermath of the investigation.

== Schedule ==
Date	Opponent	Rank	Site	Result	Attendance	Source
September 13	at Rice		Rice Stadium; Houston, TX (rivalry)	W 45–3	14,045	
September 20	at No. 18 Arizona State*		Sun Devil Stadium; Tempe, AZ	L 0–30	70,511	
September 27	vs. TCU		Cotton Bowl; Dallas, TX (rivalry)	W 31–21	35,481	
October 4	Boston College*		Texas Stadium; Irving, TX	W 31–29	26,432	
October 11	at No. 13 Baylor		Baylor Stadium; Waco, TX	W 27–21	36,927	
October 18	Houston	No. T–20	Texas Stadium; Irving, TX (rivalry)	W 10–3	25,967	
October 25	at Texas	No. 18	Texas Memorial Stadium; Austin, TX	L 24–27	65,481	
November 1	No. 10 Texas A&M		Texas Stadium; Irving, TX	L 35–39	58,125	
November 8	at Notre Dame*		Notre Dame Stadium; Notre Dame, IN	L 29–61	59,075	
November 15	at Texas Tech		Jones Stadium; Lubbock, TX	W 13–7	35,887	
November 22	No. 11 Arkansas		Texas Stadium; Irving, TX	L 0–41	32,382	
*Non-conference game; Rankings from AP Poll released prior to the game

== Personnel ==
- QB Bobby Watters Jr.
- OT David Richards Jr.
- LB Ben Hummel, Jr.
