= 1986 Weber State Wildcats football team =

American college football season

1986 Weber State Wildcats football
- Conference: Big Sky Conference
- Record: 3–8 (2–5 Big Sky)
- Head coach: Mike Price (6th season)
- Home stadium: Wildcat Stadium

1986 Big Sky Conference football standings
	Conf.					Overall
Team	W		L		T	W		L		T
No. 1 Nevada $^	7	–	0	–	0	13	–	1	–	0
No. 16 Idaho ^	8	–	2	–	0	8	–	4	–	0
Northern Arizona	5	–	2	–	0	7	–	4	–	0
Montana *	4	–	4	–	0	6	–	4	–	0
Boise State	3	–	4	–	0	5	–	6	–	0
Weber State	2	–	5	–	0	3	–	8	–	0
Montana State	2	–	5	–	0	3	–	8	–	0
Idaho State *	1	–	7	–	0	2	–	9	–	0
$ – Conference champion; ^ – NCAA Division I-AA playoff participant; * – Montana and Idaho State played twice.; Rankings from NCAA Division I-AA Poll

The 1986 Weber State Wildcats football team represented Weber State College (now known as Weber State University) as a member of the Big Sky Conference during the 1986 NCAA Division I-AA football season. Led by sixth-year head coach Mike Price, the Wildcats compiled an overall record of 3–8, with a mark of 2–5 in conference play, and finished tied for sixth in the Big Sky.

== Schedule ==
Date	Opponent	Site	Result	Attendance	Source
September 13	Adams State*	Wildcat Stadium; Ogden, UT	W 55–21	10,384	
September 20	at Northern Arizona	Walkup Skydome; Flagstaff, AZ	L 24–45	7,422	
September 27	at Portland State*	Civic Stadium; Portland, OR	L 22–27	3,234	
October 4	No. 1 Nevada	Wildcat Stadium; Ogden, UT	L 24–38	9,037	
October 11	Montana State	Wildcat Stadium; Ogden, UT	W 24–3	8,102	
October 18	at Boise State	Bronco Stadium; Boise, ID	L 13–23	15,169	
October 25	Idaho State	Wildcat Stadium; Ogden, UT	W 63–33	6,241	
November 1	at Eastern Washington*	Joe Albi Stadium; Spokane, WA	L 31–41	3,825	
November 8	Montana	Wildcat Stadium; Ogden, UT	L 29–55	2,190	
November 15	at Idaho	Kibbie Dome; Moscow, ID	L 17–31	5,917	
November 22	at No. 16 Nicholls State*	John L. Guidry Stadium; Thibodaux, LA	L 30–34	6,102	
*Non-conference game; Rankings from NCAA Division I-AA Football Committee Poll released prior to the game
