= 1986 Texas Longhorns football team =

American college football season

1986 Texas Longhorns football
- Conference: Southwest Conference
- Record: 5–6 (4–4 SWC)
- Head coach: Fred Akers (10th season)
- Offensive coordinator: Dwain Painter (1st season)
- Home stadium: Texas Memorial Stadium

1986 Southwest Conference football standings
	Conf.					Overall
Team	W		L		T	W		L		T
No. 13 Texas A&M $	7	–	1	–	0	9	–	3	–	0
No. 15 Arkansas	6	–	2	–	0	9	–	3	–	0
No. 12 Baylor	6	–	2	–	0	9	–	3	–	0
Texas Tech	5	–	3	–	0	7	–	5	–	0
SMU	5	–	3	–	0	6	–	5	–	0
Texas	4	–	4	–	0	5	–	6	–	0
Rice	2	–	6	–	0	4	–	7	–	0
TCU	1	–	7	–	0	3	–	8	–	0
Houston	0	–	8	–	0	1	–	10	–	0
$ – Conference champion; Rankings from AP Poll

The 1986 Texas Longhorns football team represented the University of Texas at Austin in the 1986 NCAA Division I-A football season. The Longhorns finished the regular season with a 5–6 record, their first losing season since 1956. Following their 16–3 loss to rival Texas A&M, athletic director DeLoss Dodds dismissed head coach Fred Akers.

== Schedule ==
Date	Time	Opponent	Site	TV	Result	Attendance	Source
September 13	7:00 p.m.	Stanford*	Texas Memorial Stadium; Austin, TX		L 20–31	74,372	
September 20	1:30 p.m.	at Missouri*	Faurot Field; Columbia, MO		W 27–25	46,227	
October 4	7:00 p.m.	at Rice	Rice Stadium; Houston, TX (rivalry)		W 17–14	31,000	
October 11	2:30 p.m.	vs. No. 6 Oklahoma*	Cotton Bowl; Dallas, TX (Red River Shootout)	ABC	L 12–47	75,587	
October 18	6:45 p.m.	No. 14 Arkansas	Texas Memorial Stadium; Austin, TX (rivalry)	ESPN	L 14–21	67,344	
October 25	1:00 p.m.	No. 18 SMU	Texas Memorial Stadium; Austin, TX		W 27–24	65,481	
November 1	12:00 p.m.	at Texas Tech	Jones Stadium; Lubbock, TX (rivalry)	USA	L 21–23	44,820	
November 8	1:00 p.m.	Houston	Texas Memorial Stadium; Austin, TX		W 30–10	60,650	
November 15	12:00 p.m.	at TCU	Amon G. Carter Stadium; Fort Worth, TX (rivalry)		W 45–16	27,517	
November 22	2:00 p.m.	at No. 17 Baylor	Baylor Stadium; Waco, TX (rivalry)		L 13–18	32,500	
November 27	7:20 p.m.	Texas A&M	Texas Memorial Stadium; Austin, TX (rivalry)	ESPN	L 3–16	75,623	
*Non-conference game; Rankings from AP Poll released prior to the game; All times are in Central time

== Game summaries ==
=== Texas A&M ===
#10 Texas A&M Aggies (8–2) at Texas Longhorns (5–5)

Quarter	1	2	3	4	Total
Texas A&M	0	3	10	3	16
Texas	3	0	0	0	3

at Texas Memorial Stadium, Austin, Texas

- Date: November 27
- Game weather: Overcast, 53 °F (12 °C)
- Game attendance: 75,623
- Box Score

Game information

First quarter

- UT – Jeff Ward 39-yard field goal, 1:57. Texas 3–0. Drive: 10 plays, 68 yards, 3:38.

Second quarter

- A&M – Slater 22-yard field goal, 0:05. Tie 3–3. Drive: 9 plays, 54 yards, 1:32.

Third quarter

- A&M – Harris 6 yard pass from Murray (Slater kick), 10:11. Texas A&M 10–3. Drive: 13 plays, 75 yards, 4:49.
- A&M – Slater 44-yard field goal, 3:24. Texas A&M 13–3. Drive: 5 plays, 25 yards, 2:09.

Fourth quarter

- A&M – Slater 34-yard field goal, 14:50. Texas A&M 16–3. Drive: 7 plays, 51 yards, 2:22.

Top passers

- A&M –
- UT – Bret Stafford – 15/30, 201 yards, INT

Top rushers

- A&M
- UT – Charles Hunter – 3 rushes, 17 yards

Top receivers

- A&M
- UT – Gabriel Johnson – 3 receptions, 70 yards

== Personnel ==
1986 Texas Longhorns football team roster
Players
Coaches
Offense

Pos.	#	Name	Class
OL		Bruce Blackmar
WR		Laron Brown
RB		Anthony Byerly
OL		Alan Champagne
TE		Steven Clark
OL		Steve Eargle
QB		Donovan Forbes
WR		Everett Gay
OL		Carter Hill
OL		Rick Houston
RB		Charles Hunter
OL		Paul Jetton
WR		Gabriel Johnson
WR		Tony Jones
TE		Tim McCray
RB		Eric Metcalf
WR		Kevin Nelson
RB		Darron Norris
WR		Jeremy Robertson
RB		Lance Seach
RB		Edwin Simmons
QB		Bret Stafford
RB		Darryl Taylor
OL		Billy Ray Todd

Defense

Pos.	#	Name	Class
DL		Thomas Aldridge
DB		Stephen Braggs
DL		Blake Brawner
LB		Lee Brockman
LB		Duane Duncum
DL		Brian Espinosa
DB		Anthony Griffin
LB		Britt Hager
DB		John Hagy
LB		Mike January
DB		Eric Jeffries
DL		Steve Llewellyn
LB		Bobby Rhodes
DB		Gerard Senegal
DL		Terry Steelhammer

Special teams

Pos.	#	Name	Class
P		Alex Waits
K		Jeff Ward

Head coach

- Fred Akers

Coordinators/assistant coaches

- Paul Jette (co-DC)
- Dwain Painter (OC)
- Bob Stanley (co-DC)

Legend

- (C) Team captain
- (S) Suspended
- (I) Ineligible
- Injured
- Redshirt

Roster
