= 1986 McNeese State Cowboys football team =

American college football season

1986 McNeese State Cowboys football
- Conference: Southland Conference
- Record: 2–9 (1–4 Southland)
- Head coach: John McCann (4th season)
- Offensive coordinator: Steve Ensminger (3rd season)
- Home stadium: Cowboy Stadium

1986 Southland Conference football standings
	Conf.					Overall
Team	W		L		T	W		L		T
No. 2 Arkansas State $^	5	–	0	–	0	12	–	2	–	1
North Texas State	3	–	2	–	0	6	–	4	–	0
Louisiana Tech	3	–	2	–	0	6	–	4	–	1
Northeast Louisiana	3	–	2	–	0	5	–	6	–	0
McNeese State	1	–	4	–	0	2	–	9	–	0
Lamar	0	–	5	–	0	2	–	9	–	0
$ – Conference champion; ^ – NCAA Division I-AA playoff participant; Rankings from NCAA Division I-AA Football Committee poll

The 1986 McNeese State Cowboys football team was an American football team that represented McNeese State University as a member of the Southland Conference (Southland) during the 1986 NCAA Division I-AA football season. In fourth year under head coach John McCann, the team compiled an overall record of 2–9, with a mark of 1–4 in conference play, and finished fifth in the Southland.

== Schedule ==
Date	Opponent	Site	Result	Attendance	Source
September 6	Prairie View A&M*	Cowboy Stadium; Lake Charles, LA	W 57–24	19,778	
September 13	Northwestern State*	Cowboy Stadium; Lake Charles, LA (rivalry)	L 3–9		
September 20	at Nicholls State*	John L. Guidry Stadium; Thibodaux, LA	L 10–34		
September 27	at North Texas State	Fouts Field; Denton, TX	L 13–21	14,800	
October 4	at Southwest Texas State*	Bobcat Stadium; San Marcos, TX	L 9–13		
October 11	Louisiana Tech	Cowboy Stadium; Lake Charles, LA	L 16–28	18,000	
October 18	Northeast Louisiana	Cowboy Stadium; Lake Charles, LA	L 17–37	14,000	
October 25	at No. 4 Arkansas State	Indian Stadium; Jonesboro, AR	L 14–23		
November 8	at Northern Iowa*	UNI-Dome; Cedar Falls, IA	L 38–55	7,575	
November 15	at Southwestern Louisiana*	Cowboy Stadium; Lake Charles, LA (rivalry)	L 13–33	18,353	
November 22	Lamar	Cowboy Stadium; Lake Charles, LA (rivalry)	W 38–7		
*Non-conference game; Rankings from NCAA Division I-AA Football Committee Poll released prior to the game
