= 1986 Boise State Broncos football team =

American college football season

1986 Boise State Broncos football
- Conference: Big Sky Conference
- Record: 5–6 (3–4 Big Sky)
- Head coach: Lyle Setencich (4th season)
- Home stadium: Bronco Stadium

1986 Big Sky Conference football standings
	Conf.					Overall
Team	W		L		T	W		L		T
No. 1 Nevada $^	7	–	0	–	0	13	–	1	–	0
No. 16 Idaho ^	8	–	2	–	0	8	–	4	–	0
Northern Arizona	5	–	2	–	0	7	–	4	–	0
Montana *	4	–	4	–	0	6	–	4	–	0
Boise State	3	–	4	–	0	5	–	6	–	0
Weber State	2	–	5	–	0	3	–	8	–	0
Montana State	2	–	5	–	0	3	–	8	–	0
Idaho State *	1	–	7	–	0	2	–	9	–	0
$ – Conference champion; ^ – NCAA Division I-AA playoff participant; * – Montana and Idaho State played twice.; Rankings from NCAA Division I-AA Poll

The 1986 Boise State Broncos football team represented Boise State University as a member of Big Sky Conference during the 1986 NCAA Division I-AA football season. Led by fourth-year head coach Lyle Setencich, the Broncos compiled an overall record of 5–6 with a mark of 3–4 in conference play, placing fifth in the Big Sky. Boise State played home games on campus, at Bronco Stadium in Boise, Idaho.

Prior to the season, BSU athletic director Gene Bleymaier had blue AstroTurf installed in Bronco Stadium, the first non-green field in the NCAA.

Boise State struggled with injuries and had its first losing season in four decades; shortly after the season concluded in Boise with a fifth consecutive loss in the series with rival Idaho, Setencich resigned.

== Schedule ==
Date	Time	Opponent	Rank	Site	Result	Attendance	Source
September 6	2:00 pm	at No. 8 Eastern Washington*	No. 15	Joe Albi Stadium; Spokane, WA	L 19–21	5,530	
September 13	7:00 pm	Humboldt State*		Bronco Stadium; Boise, ID	W 74–0	17,456	
September 27		at Idaho State		ASISU Minidome; Pocatello, ID	L 6–25	11,055	
October 4		at Montana State		Reno H. Sales Stadium; Bozeman, MT	W 31–14	7,027	
October 11	7:00 pm	Montana		Bronco Stadium; Boise, ID	W 31–0	16,444	
October 18	7:00 pm	Weber State		Bronco Stadium; Boise, ID	W 23–13	15,169	
October 25	2:30 pm	at Oregon State*		Parker Stadium; Corvallis, OR	L 3–34	21,264	
November 1	7:00 pm	at Northern Arizona		Walkup Skydome; Flagstaff, AZ	L 14–17	9,488	
November 8	1:30 pm	No. 1 Nevada^{†}		Bronco Stadium; Boise, ID (rivalry)	L 16–21	17,934	
November 15	1:30 pm	Northwestern State*		Bronco Stadium; Boise, ID	W 31–17	11,159	
November 22	1:30 pm	No. 20 Idaho		Bronco Stadium; Boise, ID (rivalry)	L 14–21	21,275	
*Non-conference game; ^{†}Homecoming; Rankings from NCAA Division I-AA Football Committee Poll released prior to the game; All times are in Mountain time
