= 1986 Montana State Bobcats football team =

American college football season

1986 Montana State Bobcats football
- Conference: Big Sky Conference
- Record: 3–8 (2–5 Big Sky)
- Head coach: Dave Arnold (4th season)
- Home stadium: Sales Stadium

1986 Big Sky Conference football standings
	Conf.					Overall
Team	W		L		T	W		L		T
No. 1 Nevada $^	7	–	0	–	0	13	–	1	–	0
No. 16 Idaho ^	8	–	2	–	0	8	–	4	–	0
Northern Arizona	5	–	2	–	0	7	–	4	–	0
Montana *	4	–	4	–	0	6	–	4	–	0
Boise State	3	–	4	–	0	5	–	6	–	0
Weber State	2	–	5	–	0	3	–	8	–	0
Montana State	2	–	5	–	0	3	–	8	–	0
Idaho State *	1	–	7	–	0	2	–	9	–	0
$ – Conference champion; ^ – NCAA Division I-AA playoff participant; * – Montana and Idaho State played twice.; Rankings from NCAA Division I-AA Poll

The 1986 Montana State Bobcats football team was an American football team that represented Montana State University in the Big Sky Conference (Big Sky) during the 1986 NCAA Division I-AA football season. In their fourth and final season under head coach Dave Arnold, the Bobcats compiled a 3–8 record (2–5 against Big Sky opponents) and tied for sixth out of eight teams in the Big Sky.

== Schedule ==
Date	Opponent	Site	Result	Attendance	Source
September 6	at Fresno State*	Bulldog Stadium; Fresno, CA	L 2–55	34,512	
September 13	at Sam Houston State*	Bowers Stadium; Huntsville, TX	L 6–23	11,500	
September 20	Idaho State	Sales Stadium; Bozeman, MT	W 50–27	8,277	
September 27	No. 1 Nevada	Sales Stadium; Bozeman, MT	L 10–61	11,637	
October 4	Boise State	Sales Stadium; Bozeman, MT	L 14–31	7,027	
October 11	at Weber State	Wildcat Stadium; Ogden, UT	L 3–24	8,102	
October 18	Northern Arizona^{†}	Sales Stadium; Bozeman, MT	W 27–19	10,497	
October 25	at Montana	Washington–Grizzly Stadium; Missoula, MT (rivalry)	L 28–59	13,362	
November 1	Northern Iowa*	Sales Stadium; Bozeman, MT	W 46–25	5,227	
November 8	at Idaho	Kibbie Dome; Moscow, ID	L 17–44	8,200	
November 15	at Eastern Washington	Joe Albi Stadium; Spokane, WA	L 14–27	1,838	
*Non-conference game; ^{†}Homecoming; Rankings from NCAA Division I-AA Football Committee Poll released prior to the game
