= 1986 TCU Horned Frogs football team =

American college football season

1986 TCU Horned Frogs football
- Conference: Southwest Conference
- Record: 3–8 (1–7 SWC)
- Head coach: Jim Wacker (4th season)
- Defensive coordinator: Tom Mueller (4th season)
- Home stadium: Amon G. Carter Stadium

1986 Southwest Conference football standings
	Conf.					Overall
Team	W		L		T	W		L		T
No. 13 Texas A&M $	7	–	1	–	0	9	–	3	–	0
No. 15 Arkansas	6	–	2	–	0	9	–	3	–	0
No. 12 Baylor	6	–	2	–	0	9	–	3	–	0
Texas Tech	5	–	3	–	0	7	–	5	–	0
SMU	5	–	3	–	0	6	–	5	–	0
Texas	4	–	4	–	0	5	–	6	–	0
Rice	2	–	6	–	0	4	–	7	–	0
TCU	1	–	7	–	0	3	–	8	–	0
Houston	0	–	8	–	0	1	–	10	–	0
$ – Conference champion; Rankings from AP Poll

The 1986 TCU Horned Frogs football team represented Texas Christian University (TCU) in the 1986 NCAA Division I-A football season. The Horned Frogs finished the season 3–8 overall and 1–7 in Southwest Conference. The team was coached by Jim Wacker, in his fourth year as head coach. The Frogs played their home games in Amon G. Carter Stadium, which is located on campus in Fort Worth, Texas.

== Schedule ==
Date	Time	Opponent	Site	TV	Result	Attendance	Source
September 13		at Tulane*	Louisiana Superdome; New Orleans, LA		W 48–31	34,187	
September 20		Kansas State*	Amon G. Carter Stadium; Fort Worth, TX		W 35–22	26,139	
September 27		vs. SMU	Cotton Bowl; Dallas, TX (rivalry)		L 21–31	35,481	
October 4		at No. 8 Arkansas	Razorback Stadium; Fayetteville, AR	Raycom	L 17–34	41,808	
October 11		Rice	Amon G. Carter Stadium; Fort Worth, TX		L 31–37	21,092	
October 18		North Texas State*	Amon G. Carter Stadium; Fort Worth, TX		L 20–24	16,021	
October 25		Baylor	Amon G. Carter Stadium; Fort Worth, TX (rivalry)		L 17–28	24,101	
November 1		at Houston	Houston Astrodome; Houston, TX		W 30–14	10,125	
November 8	2:00 p.m.	Texas Tech	Amon G. Carter Stadium; Fort Worth, TX (rivalry)		L 14–36	25,729	
November 15	12:00 p.m.	Texas	Amon G. Carter Stadium; Fort Worth, TX (rivalry)	Raycom	L 16–45	27,517	
November 22		at No. 13 Texas A&M	Kyle Field; College Station, TX (rivalry)		L 10–74	59,126	
*Non-conference game; Rankings from AP Poll released prior to the game; All times are in Central time
