= 1986 Nicholls State Colonels football team =

American college football season

1986 Nicholls State Colonels football

NCAA Division I-AA Second Round, L 31–55 vs. Georgia Southern
- Conference: Gulf Star Conference
- Record: 10–3 (2–2 Gulf Star)
- Head coach: Sonny Jackson (6th season)
- Home stadium: John L. Guidry Stadium

1986 Gulf Star Conference football standings
	Conf.					Overall
Team	W		L		T	W		L		T
No. 11 Sam Houston State $^	3	–	1	–	0	8	–	3	–	0
No. 12 Nicholls State ^	2	–	2	–	0	10	–	3	–	0
Northwestern State	2	–	2	–	0	5	–	5	–	1
Southwest Texas State	2	–	2	–	0	4	–	7	–	0
Stephen F. Austin	1	–	3	–	0	5	–	6	–	0
$ – Conference champion; ^ – NCAA Division I-AA playoff participant; Rankings from NCAA Division I-AA Football Committee poll

The 1986 Nicholls State Colonels football team represented Nicholls State University as a member of the Gulf Star Conference during the 1986 NCAA Division I-AA football season. Led by sixth-year head coach Sonny Jackson, the Colonels compiled an overall record of 10–3 with a mark of 2–2 in conference play, placing in a three-way tie for second in the Gulf State. Nicholls State advanced to the NCAA Division I-AA Football Championship playoffs, beating Appalachian State in the first round before losing to the eventual national champion, Georgia Southern in the quarterfinals. The team played home games at John L. Guidry Stadium in Thibodaux, Louisiana.

== Schedule ==
Date	Opponent	Rank	Site	Result	Attendance	Source
September 6	at Youngstown State*		Stambaugh Stadium; Youngstown, OH	W 34–17		
September 13	at No. 13 (D-II) Troy State*		Veterans Memorial Stadium; Troy, AL	W 26–25	7,500	
September 20	McNeese State*		John L. Guidry Stadium; Thibodaux, LA	W 34–10		
September 27	Northeast Louisiana*	No. 17	John L. Guidry Stadium; Thibodaux, LA	W 17–13		
October 4	at Southwest Missouri State*	No. 12	Briggs Stadium; Springfield, MO	W 31–0		
October 11	No. T–16 Southern*	No. T–9	John L. Guidry Stadium; Thibodaux, LA	W 17–10		
October 18	at No. 19 Stephen F. Austin	No. T–9	Homer Bryce Stadium; Nacogdoches, TX	W 14–10		
October 25	at Southwest Texas State	No. 10	Bobcat Stadium; San Marcos, TX (rivalry)	W 35–21		
November 1	Sam Houston State	No. 4	John L. Guidry Stadium; Thibodaux, LA	L 38–41		
November 8	at Northwestern State	No. 10	Harry Turpin Stadium; Natchitoches, LA (NSU Challenge)	L 13–28		
November 22	Weber State*	No. 16	John L. Guidry Stadium; Thibodaux, LA	W 34–30	6,102	
November 29	at No. 6 Appalachian State*	No. 12	Conrad Stadium; Boone, NC (NCAA Division I-AA First Round)	W 28–26	7,767	
December 6	at No. 4 Georgia Southern*	No. 12	Paulson Stadium; Statesboro, GA (NCAA Division I-AA Second Round)	L 31–55	9,121	
*Non-conference game; Rankings from NCAA Division I-AA Football Committee Poll released prior to the game
