= 1986 Idaho State Bengals football team =

American college football season

1986 Idaho State Bengals football
- Conference: Big Sky Conference
- Record: 2–9 (1–7 Big Sky)
- Head coach: Jim Koetter (4th season)
- Offensive scheme: West Coast
- Defensive coordinator: Jim Moller (4th season)
- Base defense: 4–3
- Home stadium: ASISU Minidome

1986 Big Sky Conference football standings
	Conf.					Overall
Team	W		L		T	W		L		T
No. 1 Nevada $^	7	–	0	–	0	13	–	1	–	0
No. 16 Idaho ^	8	–	2	–	0	8	–	4	–	0
Northern Arizona	5	–	2	–	0	7	–	4	–	0
Montana *	4	–	4	–	0	6	–	4	–	0
Boise State	3	–	4	–	0	5	–	6	–	0
Weber State	2	–	5	–	0	3	–	8	–	0
Montana State	2	–	5	–	0	3	–	8	–	0
Idaho State *	1	–	7	–	0	2	–	9	–	0
$ – Conference champion; ^ – NCAA Division I-AA playoff participant; * – Montana and Idaho State played twice.; Rankings from NCAA Division I-AA Poll

The 1986 Idaho State Bengals football team represented Idaho State University as a member of the Big Sky Conference during the 1986 NCAA Division I-AA football season. Led by fourth-year head coach Jim Koetter, the Bengals compiled an overall record of 2–9, with a mark of 1–7 in conference play, and finished eighth in the Big Sky.

== Schedule ==
Date	Opponent	Site	Result	Attendance	Source
September 6	Chico State*	ASISU Minidome; Pocatello, ID	W 43–17	7,833	
September 13	at Cal State Fullerton*	Santa Ana Stadium; Santa Ana, CA	L 25–35	3,722	
September 20	at Montana State	ASISU Minidome; Pocatello, ID	L 27–50	8,277	
September 27	Boise State	ASISU Minidome; Pocatello, ID	W 25–6	11,055	
October 4	at No. 17 Idaho	Kibbie Dome; Moscow, ID (rivalry)	L 26–38	9,500	
October 11	Eastern Washington*	ASISU Minidome; Pocatello, ID	L 7–34	6,008	
October 18	at Montana	Washington–Grizzly Stadium; Missoula, MT	L 31–38	10,580	
October 25	at Weber State	Wildcat Stadium; Ogden, UT	L 33–63	6,241	
November 1	No. 1 Nevada	ASISU Minidome; Pocatello, ID	L 14–44	7,551	
November 8	at Northern Arizona	Walkup Skydome; Flagstaff, AZ	L 17–31	6,686	
November 15	Montana	ASISU Minidome; Pocatello, ID	L 13–57	5,917	
*Non-conference game; Rankings from NCAA Division I-AA Football Committee Poll released prior to the game
