= 1986 Eastern Washington Eagles football team =

American college football season

1986 Eastern Washington Eagles football
- Conference: Independent
- Record: 5–5
- Head coach: Dick Zornes (8th season)
- Home stadium: Joe Albi Stadium

1986 NCAA Division I-AA independents football standings
	Conf.			Overall
Team	W	L	T	W		L		T
No. 4 Georgia Southern ^		–		13	–	2	–	0
No. 14 Tennessee State ^		–		10	–	2	–	1
No. 8 William & Mary ^		–		9	–	3	–	0
Eastern Washington		–		5	–	5	–	0
James Madison		–		5	–	5	–	1
Florida A&M		–		5	–	6	–	0
Northeastern		–		4	–	6	–	0
Western Kentucky		–		4	–	6	–	1
^ – NCAA Division I-AA playoff participant; Rankings from NCAA Division I-AA Football Committee poll

The 1986 Eastern Washington Eagles football team was an American football team that represented Eastern Washington University as an independent during the 1986 NCAA Division I-AA football season. Led by eighth-year head coach Dick Zornes, the team compiled a 5–5 record.

The September 20 game against the University of British Columbia (UBC) was an exhibition game and not included in the Eagles' overall record for the season.

== Schedule ==
Date	Opponent	Rank	Site	Result	Attendance	Source
September 6	No. 15 Boise State	No. 8	Joe Albi Stadium; Spokane, WA	W 21–19	5,530	
September 13	at Northern Arizona	No. 8	Walkup Skydome; Flagstaff, AZ	W 28–6	6,954	
September 20	UBC	No. 8	Joe Albi Stadium; Spokane, WA	W 37–0	2,895	
September 27	Idaho	No. 6	Joe Albi Stadium; Spokane, WA	L 10–27	7,835	
October 4	at Montana		Dornblaser Field; Missoula, MT (rivalry)	L 37–42	7,389	
October 11	at Idaho State		ASISU Minidome; Pocatello, ID	W 34–7	6,008	
October 18	Central State (OK)		Joe Albi Stadium; Spokane, WA	L 33–39	2,448	
October 25	at No. 1 Nevada		Mackay Stadium; Reno, NV	L 22–56	14,420	
November 1	Weber State		Joe Albi Stadium; Spokane, WA	W 41–31	3,825	
November 8	at Long Beach State		Veterans Memorial Stadium; Long Beach, CA	L 34–35	8,803	
November 15	Montana State		Joe Albi Stadium; Spokane, WA	W 27–14	1,838	
Rankings from NCAA Division I-AA Football Committee Poll released prior to the game
