= 1986 Baylor Bears football team =

American college football season

1986 Baylor Bears football

Bluebonnet Bowl champion

Bluebonnet Bowl, W 21–9 vs. Colorado
- Conference: Southwest Conference

Ranking
- Coaches: No. 13
- AP: No. 12
- Record: 9–3 (6–2 SWC)
- Head coach: Grant Teaff (15th season)
- Offensive coordinator: Duke Christian (8th season)
- Offensive scheme: I formation
- Defensive coordinator: Pete Fredenburg (4th season)
- Base defense: 4–4
- Home stadium: Baylor Stadium

1986 Southwest Conference football standings
	Conf.					Overall
Team	W		L		T	W		L		T
No. 13 Texas A&M $	7	–	1	–	0	9	–	3	–	0
No. 15 Arkansas	6	–	2	–	0	9	–	3	–	0
No. 12 Baylor	6	–	2	–	0	9	–	3	–	0
Texas Tech	5	–	3	–	0	7	–	5	–	0
SMU	5	–	3	–	0	6	–	5	–	0
Texas	4	–	4	–	0	5	–	6	–	0
Rice	2	–	6	–	0	4	–	7	–	0
TCU	1	–	7	–	0	3	–	8	–	0
Houston	0	–	8	–	0	1	–	10	–	0
$ – Conference champion; Rankings from AP Poll

The 1986 Baylor Bears football team represented Baylor University as a member of the Southwest Conference (SWC) during the 1986 NCAA Division I-A football season. Led by 15th-year head coach Grant Teaff, the Bears compiled an overall record of 9–3 with a mark of 6–2 in conference play, tying for second place in the SWC. Baylor was invited to the Bluebonnet Bowl, where the Bears defeated Colorado. The team played home games at Baylor Stadium in Waco, Texas.

The Bears offense scored 325 points, while the Bears defense allowed 207 points. In the Battle of the Brazos, Texas Football magazine voted the 1986 football game between Baylor and Texas A&M the outstanding game of the Southwest Conference of the 1980s. Texas A&M overcame a 17–0 deficit, and won the game, 31–30, and later won the SWC title and earned a berth in the Cotton Bowl Classic.

== Schedule ==
Date	Opponent	Rank	Site	TV	Result	Attendance	Source
September 6	at Wyoming*	No. 12	War Memorial Stadium; Laramie, WY		W 31–28	20,542	
September 13	Louisiana Tech*	No. 12	Baylor Stadium; Waco, TX		W 38–7	31,000	
September 20	USC*	No. 9	Baylor Stadium; Waco, TX	ABC	L 14–17	35,000	
September 27	at Texas Tech	No. 17	Jones Stadium; Lubbock, TX (rivalry)	Raycom	W 45–14	41,046	
October 4	Houston	No. 13	Baylor Stadium; Waco, TX (rivalry)	ESPN	W 27–13	34,000	
October 11	No. T–20 SMU	No. 13	Baylor Stadium; Waco, TX		L 21–27	36,927	
October 18	at No. 11 Texas A&M	No. T–20	Kyle Field; College Station, TX (Battle of the Brazos)	ABC	L 30–31	74,739	
October 25	at TCU		Amon G. Carter Stadium; Fort Worth, TX (rivalry)	Raycom	W 28–17	24,101	
November 8	No. 10 Arkansas^{†}		Baylor Stadium; Waco, TX	Raycom	W 29–14	44,500	
November 15	at Rice	No. 18	Rice Stadium; Houston, TX		W 23–17	12,500	
November 22	Texas	No. 17	Baylor Stadium; Waco, TX (rivalry)		W 18–13	42,500	
December 31	vs. Colorado*	No. 14	Rice Stadium; Houston, TX (Bluebonnet Bowl)	Raycom	W 21–9	40,470	
*Non-conference game; ^{†}Homecoming; Rankings from AP Poll released prior to the game

== Game summaries ==
=== USC ===
USC at Baylor

Team	1	2	3	4	Total
• Trojans	0	7	0	10	17
No. 9 Bears	7	0	0	7	14

- Date: September 20
- Location: Baylor Stadium
  Waco, Texas
- Game attendance: 35,000
- TV announcers (ABC Sports): Keith Jackson (play-by-play) and Tim Brant (analyst)

Scoring summary
1		Baylor	Matt Clark 1-yard run (Terry Syler kick)	Baylor 7–0
2	0:15	USC	Tim McDonald 99-yard fumble return (Don Shafer kick)	Tied 7–7
4	7:24	Baylor	Charles Perry 3-yard run (Terry Syler kick)	Baylor 14–7
4	3:50	USC	Ken Henry 12-yard pass from Rodney Peete (Don Shafer kick)	Tied 14–14
4	0:00	USC	Don Shafer 32-yard field goal	USC 17–14

Visiting USC stunned the No. 9 Bears on a 32-yard field goal on the final play. Baylor dominated the game statistically, outgaining USC 408-197, holding a 26-11 advantage is first downs (including not allowing USC a first down through three quarters), and maintaining a 15-minute advantage in time of possession (37:47 to 22:13). Mirroring the result of last year's matchup, the unranked road team knocked off the host with an AP top ten ranking.

== Roster ==
1986 Baylor Bears football team roster
Players
Coaches
Offense

Pos.	#	Name	Class
C	51	John Adickes	Sr
QB	14	Cody Carlson	Sr
WR	26	Derrick McAdoo	Sr

Defense

Pos.	#	Name	Class
S		Anthony Coleman	Sr
DB		Ron Francis	Sr
CB		Johnny Thomas	Sr
FS	27	Thomas Everett	Sr
LB	57	Ray Berry	Sr

Special teams

Pos.	#	Name	Class
PK	32	Jim Mueller	Sr
K		Terry Syler	So

Head coach

- Grant Teaff

Coordinators/assistant coaches

Legend

- (C) Team captain
- (S) Suspended
- (I) Ineligible
- Injured
- Redshirt

== After the season ==
=== Awards and honors ===
- Thomas Everett, Jim Thorpe Award

=== Team players drafted into the NFL ===
The following players were drafted into professional football following the season.

Player	Position	Round	Pick	Franchise
Ron Francis	Defensive back	2	39	Dallas Cowboys
Ray Berry	Linebacker	2	44	Minnesota Vikings
Cody Carlson	Quarterback	3	64	Houston Oilers
Thomas Everett	Defensive back	4	94	Pittsburgh Steelers
John Adickes	Center	6	154	Chicago Bears
Johnny Thomas	Defensive back	7	192	Washington Redskins
