= 1986 Stephen F. Austin Lumberjacks football team =

American college football season

1986 Stephen F. Austin Lumberjacks football
- Conference: Gulf Star Conference
- Record: 5–6 (1–3 GSC)
- Head coach: Jim Hess (5th season)
- Home stadium: Homer Bryce Stadium

1986 Gulf Star Conference football standings
	Conf.					Overall
Team	W		L		T	W		L		T
No. 11 Sam Houston State $^	3	–	1	–	0	8	–	3	–	0
No. 12 Nicholls State ^	2	–	2	–	0	10	–	3	–	0
Northwestern State	2	–	2	–	0	5	–	5	–	1
Southwest Texas State	2	–	2	–	0	4	–	7	–	0
Stephen F. Austin	1	–	3	–	0	5	–	6	–	0
$ – Conference champion; ^ – NCAA Division I-AA playoff participant; Rankings from NCAA Division I-AA Football Committee poll

The 1986 Stephen F. Austin Lumberjacks football team was an American football team that represented Stephen F. Austin State University during the 1986 NCAA Division I-AA football season as a member of the Gulf Star Conference (GSC). Led by fifth-year head coach Jim Hess, the Lumberjacks compiled a 5–6 record, with a mark of 1–3 in conference play, and finished fifth in the GSC.

== Schedule ==
Date	Opponent	Rank	Site	Result	Attendance	Source
September 6	at Alcorn State*		Henderson Stadium; Lorman, MS	W 28–14	3,624	
September 13	Prairie View A&M*		Homer Bryce Stadium; Nacogdoches, TX	W 46–14		
September 27	Lamar*		Homer Bryce Stadium; Nacogdoches, TX	W 38–25		
October 4	West Texas State*		Homer Bryce Stadium; Nacogdoches, TX	W 36–31		
October 11	at No. 1 Nevada*	No. T–16	Mackay Stadium; Reno, NV	L 27–34	13,242	
October 18	No. T–9 Nicholls State^{†}	No. 19	Homer Bryce Stadium; Nacogdoches, TX	L 10–14		
October 25	at Southwestern Louisiana*		Cajun Field; Lafayette, LA	L 14–28	23,257	
November 1	at Northeast Louisiana*		Malone Stadium; Monroe, LA	L 7–28	15,238	
November 8	at Sam Houston State		Bowers Stadium; Huntsville, TX (Battle of the Piney Woods)	L 26–30		
November 15	at Southwest Texas State		Bobcat Stadium; San Marcos, TX	L 28–34		
November 22	Northwestern State		Homer Bryce Stadium; Nacogdoches, TX (rivalry)	W 28–14		
*Non-conference game; ^{†}Homecoming; Rankings from NCAA Division I-AA Football Committee Poll released prior to the game
