= 1986 Northwestern State Demons football team =

American college football season

1986 Northwestern State Demons football
- Conference: Gulf Star Conference
- Record: 5–5–1 (2–2 GSC)
- Head coach: Sam Goodwin (4th season)
- Defensive coordinator: John Thompson (4th season)
- Home stadium: Harry Turpin Stadium

1986 Gulf Star Conference football standings
	Conf.					Overall
Team	W		L		T	W		L		T
No. 11 Sam Houston State $^	3	–	1	–	0	8	–	3	–	0
No. 12 Nicholls State ^	2	–	2	–	0	10	–	3	–	0
Northwestern State	2	–	2	–	0	5	–	5	–	1
Southwest Texas State	2	–	2	–	0	4	–	7	–	0
Stephen F. Austin	1	–	3	–	0	5	–	6	–	0
$ – Conference champion; ^ – NCAA Division I-AA playoff participant; Rankings from NCAA Division I-AA Football Committee poll

The 1986 Northwestern State Demons football team was an American football team that represented Northwestern State University during the 1986 NCAA Division I-AA football season as a member of the Gulf Star Conference (GSC). Led by fourth-year head coach Sam Goodwin, the Demons compiled an 5–5–1 record, with a mark of 2–2 in conference play, and finished tied for second in the GSC.

== Schedule ==
Date	Opponent	Site	Result	Attendance	Source
September 6	at No. 7 Arkansas State*	Indian Stadium; Jonesboro, AR	L 0–21	16,419	
September 13	at McNeese State*	Cowboy Stadium; Lake Charles, LA (rivalry)	W 9–3		
September 20	Delta State*	Harry Turpin Stadium; Natchitoches, LA	W 29–10		
October 4	at Northeast Louisiana*	Malone Stadium; Monroe, LA (rivalry)	W 17–14		
October 11	at North Texas State*	Fouts Field; Denton, TX	L 3–24	13,600	
October 18	Sam Houston State	Harry Turpin Stadium; Natchitoches, LA	W 31–23		
October 25	vs. Louisiana Tech*	Independence Stadium; Shreveport, LA (rivalry)	T 13–13	12,301	
November 1	Southwest Texas State	Harry Turpin Stadium; Natchitoches, LA	L 6–29		
November 8	No. 10 Nicholls State	Harry Turpin Stadium; Natchitoches, LA (rivalry)	W 28–13		
November 15	at Boise State*	Bronco Stadium; Boise, ID	L 17–31	11,159	
November 22	at Stephen F. Austin	Homer Bryce Stadium; Nacogdoches, TX (rivalry)	L 14–28		
*Non-conference game; Rankings from NCAA Division I-AA Football Committee Poll released prior to the game
