= 1986 Louisiana Tech Bulldogs football team =

American college football season

1986 Louisiana Tech Bulldogs football
- Conference: Southland Conference
- Record: 6–4–1 (3–2 Southland)
- Head coach: A. L. Williams (4th season)
- Captains: Walter Johnson; Clayton Shoemaker
- Home stadium: Joe Aillet Stadium

1986 Southland Conference football standings
| | Conf. | | | | | Overall |
| Team | W | | L | | T | W | | L | | T |
|---|---|---|---|---|---|---|---|---|---|---|
| No. 2 Arkansas State $^ | 5 | – | 0 | – | 0 | 12 | – | 2 | – | 1 |
| North Texas State | 3 | – | 2 | – | 0 | 6 | – | 4 | – | 0 |
| Louisiana Tech | 3 | – | 2 | – | 0 | 6 | – | 4 | – | 1 |
| Northeast Louisiana | 3 | – | 2 | – | 0 | 5 | – | 6 | – | 0 |
| McNeese State | 1 | – | 4 | – | 0 | 2 | – | 9 | – | 0 |
| Lamar | 0 | – | 5 | – | 0 | 2 | – | 9 | – | 0 |
$ – Conference champion; ^ – NCAA Division I-AA playoff participant; Rankings from NCAA Division I-AA Football Committee poll

The 1986 Louisiana Tech Bulldogs football team was an American football team that represented Louisiana Tech University as a member of the Southland Conference during the 1986 NCAA Division I-AA football season. In their fourth year under head coach A. L. Williams, the team compiled an 6–4–1 record.

== Schedule ==
| Date | Opponent | Rank | Site | Result | Attendance | Source |
|---|---|---|---|---|---|---|
| August 30 | at Tulsa* | No. 11 | Skelly Stadium; Tulsa, OK | W 22–17 | 25,667 | |
| September 13 | at Baylor* | No. 11 | Baylor Stadium; Waco, TX | L 7–38 | 31,000 | |
| September 20 | West Texas State* | No. 15 | Joe Aillet Stadium; Ruston, LA | W 24–21 | 11,600 | |
| September 27 | at Fresno State* | No. 13 | Bulldog Stadium; Fresno, CA | L 10–34 | 34,528 | |
| October 4 | North Texas State | | Joe Aillet Stadium; Ruston, LA | W 17–10 | 17,300 | |
| October 11 | at McNeese State | | Cowboy Stadium; Lake Charles, LA | W 28–16 | 18,000 | |
| October 18 | Arkansas State | No. 20 | Joe Aillet Stadium; Ruston, LA | L 17–20 | 17,800 | |
| October 25 | vs. Northwestern State* | | Independence Stadium; Shreveport, LA (rivalry) | T 13–13 | 12,301 | |
| November 1 | at Lamar | | Cardinal Stadium; Beaumont, TX | W 39–20 | 3,225 | |
| November 8 | at Northeast Louisiana | | Malone Stadium; Monroe, LA (rivalry) | L 6–20 | 20,381 | |
| November 22 | at Southwestern Louisiana* | | Cajun Field; Lafayette, LA (rivalry) | W 23–14 | 15,780 | |
*Non-conference game; Rankings from NCAA Division I-AA Football Committee Poll released prior to the game
