= 1986 Idaho Vandals football team =

American college football season

1986 Idaho Vandals football

NCAA Division I-AA First Round, L 7–27 at Nevada
- Conference: Big Sky Conference
- Record: 8–4 (5–2 Big Sky)
- Head coach: Keith Gilbertson (1st season)
- Offensive coordinator: Bill Diedrick (1st season)
- Offensive scheme: Single-back spread
- Defensive coordinator: Kent Baer (1st season)
- Base defense: 4–3
- Home stadium: Kibbie Dome

1986 Big Sky Conference football standings
	Conf.					Overall
Team	W		L		T	W		L		T
No. 1 Nevada $^	7	–	0	–	0	13	–	1	–	0
No. 16 Idaho ^	8	–	2	–	0	8	–	4	–	0
Northern Arizona	5	–	2	–	0	7	–	4	–	0
Montana *	4	–	4	–	0	6	–	4	–	0
Boise State	3	–	4	–	0	5	–	6	–	0
Weber State	2	–	5	–	0	3	–	8	–	0
Montana State	2	–	5	–	0	3	–	8	–	0
Idaho State *	1	–	7	–	0	2	–	9	–	0
$ – Conference champion; ^ – NCAA Division I-AA playoff participant; * – Montana and Idaho State played twice.; Rankings from NCAA Division I-AA Poll

The 1986 Idaho Vandals football team represented the University of Idaho in the 1986 NCAA Division I-AA football season. The Vandals, led by first-year head coach Keith Gilbertson, were members of the Big Sky Conference and played their home games at the Kibbie Dome, an indoor facility on campus in Moscow, Idaho.

Continuing upon the success of the previous four seasons under Dennis Erickson, the Vandals were defending conference champions and finished the regular season at 8–3 and 5–2 in the Big Sky, tied for second. Led by senior quarterback Scott Linehan, Idaho qualified for the I-AA playoffs for the second straight season.

== Notable games ==
The Vandals defeated rival Boise State for the fifth consecutive year, the fifth of twelve straight over the Broncos, but lost twice to Nevada, who were top-ranked in I-AA and undefeated in the regular season. Uncommon for a playoff team, the Vandals were shut out at home 24–0 by Northern Arizona in late October.

== Division I-AA playoffs ==
The playoffs were expanded from 12 to 16 teams in 1986 NCAA Division I-AA football season, eliminating the first round bye for the top four seeds. Idaho and Big Sky champion Nevada were the only two teams selected from the West, and were paired up in the first round in Reno two days after Thanksgiving. In mid-October the teams played a close defensive game, and the Vandals came up short by four points. The rematch in the post-season was not close as the Wolf Pack prevailed 27–7, improving their record over Idaho to 8–1 since joining the Big Sky in 1979.

== Notable players ==
The 1986 team included two future NFL head coaches: quarterback Scott Linehan and offensive lineman Tom Cable. Future NFL players with lengthy pro careers included guard Mark Schlereth (redshirt sophomore) and redshirt freshman John Friesz, a future collegiate hall of fame quarterback was Linehan's back-up in 1986. Friesz was a three-year starter (1987–89) and defeated Nevada-Reno all three seasons, including the first-ever victory in Reno in 1988.

== Schedule ==
Date	Time	Opponent	Rank	Site	Result	Attendance	Source
September 6	6:30 pm	Portland State*		Kibbie Dome; Moscow, ID	W 42–10	8,500	
September 13	10:00 am	at Central Michigan*		Perry Shorts Stadium; Mount Pleasant, MI	L 21–34	18,201	
September 20	1:00 pm	Cal State Fullerton*^{†}		Kibbie Dome; Moscow, ID	W 25–17	12,500	
September 27	1:00 pm	at No. 6 Eastern Washington*		Joe Albi Stadium; Spokane, WA	W 27–10	7,835	
October 4	6:30 pm	Idaho State	No. 17	Kibbie Dome; Moscow, ID (rivalry)	W 38–26	9,500	
October 18	1:00 pm	at No. 1 Nevada	No. 12	Mackay Stadium; Reno, NV	L 17–23	13,825	
October 25	6:30 pm	Northern Arizona	No. 15	Kibbie Dome; Moscow, ID	L 0–24	10,600	
November 1	12:00 pm	at Montana		Washington–Grizzly Stadium; Missoula, MY (Little Brown Stein)	W 38–31	7,303	
November 8	6:30 pm	Montana State		Kibbie Dome; Moscow, ID	W 44–17	8,200	
November 15	6:30 pm	Weber State		Kibbie Dome; Moscow, ID	W 31–17	5,917	
November 22	12:30 pm	at Boise State	No. 20	Bronco Stadium; Boise, ID (rivalry)	W 21–14	21,275	
November 29	12:00 pm	at No. 1 Nevada*	No. 16	Mackay Stadium; Reno, NV (NCAA Division I-AA First Round)	L 7–27	13,715	
*Non-conference game; ^{†}Homecoming; Rankings from NCAA (Div. I-AA); All times are in Pacific time

== Roster ==
1986 Idaho Vandals football team roster
Players
Coaches
Offense

Pos.	#	Name	Class
QB	10	Scott Linehan	Sr
QB	17	John Friesz	Fr
RB		Freddie Lloyd	Sr
RB		Todd Hoiness	So
RB	32	Steve Jackson	Sr
WR	33	Brant Bengen	Sr
TE		Craig Robinson	Jr
TE		Chris Slater	So
TE, LB		Pete Wilkins	Jr
OT		Paul Taggert	Sr
G		Scott Katz	Jr
C		Phil Benson	Jr
G		Troy Wright	Fr
OT		Greg Hale	So

Defense

Pos.	#	Name	Class
SS	13	Chris Able	So
FS	16	Mark Tidd	Sr
CB	29	Virgil Paulson	Jr
SS		Dan McCanna	Jr
LB	38	Tom Hennessey	Sr
DE, LB		Nolan Harper	Sr
LB		Mike Cox	Sr
LB		Dave Parker	Sr
LB		Shawn Nilsson	Sr
DT, OL	60	Mark Schlereth	So
DT		Craig Dowdy
DE		Kord Smith	Jr
DE		Troy Ballard	Sr
DT		Charlie Porter	Fr

Special teams

Pos.	#	Name	Class
K		Brian Decicio	So
P	7	Darin Magnuson	Sr

Head coach

- Keith Gilbertson (1st year)

Coordinators/assistant coaches

- Bill Diedrick (OC)
- Kent Baer (DC)

Legend

- (C) Team captain
- (S) Suspended
- (I) Ineligible
- Injured
- Redshirt

== All-conference ==
Linebacker Tom Hennessey was a repeat selection to the all-conference team. Eight Vandals were included on the second team: safety Mark Tidd, linebacker Nolan Harper, defensive end Kord Smith, quarterback Scott Linehan, running back Steve Jackson, wide receiver Brant Bengen, and tackles Paul Taggert and Greg Hale.
