= 1986 Southwest Texas State Bobcats football team =

American college football season

1986 Southwest Texas State Bobcats football
- Conference: Gulf Star Conference
- Record: 4–7 (2–2 GSC)
- Head coach: John O'Hara (4th season)
- Home stadium: Bobcat Stadium

1986 Gulf Star Conference football standings
	Conf.					Overall
Team	W		L		T	W		L		T
No. 11 Sam Houston State $^	3	–	1	–	0	8	–	3	–	0
No. 12 Nicholls State ^	2	–	2	–	0	10	–	3	–	0
Northwestern State	2	–	2	–	0	5	–	5	–	1
Southwest Texas State	2	–	2	–	0	4	–	7	–	0
Stephen F. Austin	1	–	3	–	0	5	–	6	–	0
$ – Conference champion; ^ – NCAA Division I-AA playoff participant; Rankings from NCAA Division I-AA Football Committee poll

The 1986 Southwest Texas State Bobcats football team was an American football team that represented Southwest Texas State University (now known as Texas State University) during the 1986 NCAA Division I-AA football season as a member of the Gulf Star Conference (GSC). In their fourth year under head coach John O'Hara, the team compiled an overall record of 4–7 with a mark of 2–2 in conference play.

== Schedule ==
Date	Opponent	Site	Result	Source
September 6	No. 20 North Texas State*	Bobcat Stadium; San Marcos, TX	L 0–7	
September 13	Abilene Christian*	Bobcat Stadium; San Marcos, TX	L 24–38	
September 20	at Northeast Louisiana*	Malone Stadium; Monroe, LA	L 14–17	
September 28	at Rice*	Rice Stadium; Houston, TX	W 31–6	
October 4	McNeese State*	Bobcat Stadium; San Marcos, TX	W 13–9	
October 11	at Northern Arizona*	Walkup Skydome; Flagstaff, AZ	L 0–39	
October 18	at Lamar*	Cardinal Stadium; Beaumont, TX	L 3–17	
October 25	No. 10 Nicholls State	Bobcat Stadium; San Marcos, TX (rivalry)	L 21–35	
November 1	at Northwestern State	Harry Turpin Stadium; Natchitoches, LA	W 29–6	
November 15	Stephen F. Austin	Bobcat Stadium; San Marcos, TX	W 34–28	
November 22	at No. 14 Sam Houston State	Bowers Stadium; Huntsville, TX (rivalry)	L 31–32	
*Non-conference game; Rankings from NCAA Division I-AA Football Committee Poll released prior to the game
