= 1986 Texas A&M Aggies football team =

American college football season

1986 Texas A&M Aggies football

SWC champion

Cotton Bowl Classic, L 12–28 vs. Ohio State
- Conference: Southwest Conference

Ranking
- Coaches: No. 12
- AP: No. 13
- Record: 9–3 (7–1 SWC)
- Head coach: Jackie Sherrill (5th season)
- Offensive coordinator: Lynn Amedee (2nd season)
- Offensive scheme: Multiple
- Defensive coordinator: R. C. Slocum (7th season)
- Base defense: 3–4
- Home stadium: Kyle Field

1986 Southwest Conference football standings
	Conf.					Overall
Team	W		L		T	W		L		T
No. 13 Texas A&M $	7	–	1	–	0	9	–	3	–	0
No. 15 Arkansas	6	–	2	–	0	9	–	3	–	0
No. 12 Baylor	6	–	2	–	0	9	–	3	–	0
Texas Tech	5	–	3	–	0	7	–	5	–	0
SMU	5	–	3	–	0	6	–	5	–	0
Texas	4	–	4	–	0	5	–	6	–	0
Rice	2	–	6	–	0	4	–	7	–	0
TCU	1	–	7	–	0	3	–	8	–	0
Houston	0	–	8	–	0	1	–	10	–	0
$ – Conference champion; Rankings from AP Poll

The 1986 Texas A&M Aggies football team represented Texas A&M University as a member of the Southwest Conference (SWC) during the 1986 NCAA Division I-A football season. Led by fifth-year head coach Jackie Sherrill, the Aggies compiled an overall record of 9–3 with a mark of 7–1 in conference play, winning the SWC title for the second consecutive season. Texas A&M earned a berth in the Cotton Bowl Classic, where the Aggies lost to Ohio State. The team played home games at Kyle Field in College Station, Texas.

== Schedule ==
Date	Time	Opponent	Rank	Site	TV	Result	Attendance	Source
September 13	7:00 pm	at No. 15 LSU*	No. 7	Tiger Stadium; Baton Rouge, LA (rivalry)	ESPN	L 17–35	79,713	
September 20		North Texas State*	No. 16	Kyle Field; College Station, TX		W 48–28	54,406	
September 27		Southern Miss*		Kyle Field; College Station, TX		W 16–7	54,938	
October 4	1:30 pm	Texas Tech	No. 14	Kyle Field; College Station, TX (rivalry)		W 45–8	62,876	
October 11		at Houston	No. 14	Houston Astrodome; Houston, TX	Raycom	W 19–7	28,277	
October 18		No. 11 Baylor	No. 20	Kyle Field; College Station, TX (Battle of the Brazos)	ABC	W 31–30	74,739	
October 25		Rice	No. 10	Kyle Field; College Station, TX		W 45–10	51,885	
November 1		at SMU	No. 10	Texas Stadium; Irving, TX		W 39–35	58,125	
November 15		at No. 17 Arkansas	No. 7	War Memorial Stadium; Little Rock, AR (rivalry)	ABC	L 10–14	54,912	
November 22		TCU	No. 13	Kyle Field; College Station, TX (rivalry)	Raycom	W 74–10	59,126	
November 27		at Texas	No. 10	Texas Memorial Stadium; Austin, TX (rivalry)	ESPN	W 16–3	75,623	
January 1	12:30 pm	vs. No. 11 Ohio State*	No. 8	Cotton Bowl; Dallas, TX (Cotton Bowl Classic)	CBS	L 12–28	74,188	
*Non-conference game; Rankings from AP Poll released prior to the game; All times are in Central time

== Rankings ==
Ranking movements Legend: ██ Increase in ranking ██ Decrease in ranking ( ) = First-place votes
	Week														
Poll	Pre	1	2	3	4	5	6	7	8	9	10	11	12	13	Final
AP	7 (1)	7	16	14	14	14	11	10	10	8	7	13	10	8	13
Coaches	3 (5)	7	19	16	15	15	11	10	10	8	7	11	9	7	12

== Game summaries ==
=== At LSU ===
Team	1	2	3	4	Total
Texas A&M	7	7	3	0	17
• LSU	7	7	14	7	35

- Date: September 13
- Location: Tiger Stadium, Baton Rouge, Louisiana
- Game attendance: 79,713
- Game weather: 83 °F (28 °C), Clear, Wind W 9 mph (14 km/h)
- TV announcers (ESPN): Mike Patrick, Pat McInally, and Tim Brando

=== Baylor ===
Team	1	2	3	4	Total
Baylor	17	3	7	3	30
• Texas A&M	0	14	3	14	31

- Date: October 18
- Location: Kyle Field
- Game attendance: 74,739
- TV announcers (ABC): Corey McPherrin, Lynn Swann, and Becky Dixon

=== Vs. Ohio State (Cotton Bowl) ===
Team	1	2	3	4	Total
• Ohio State	0	7	14	7	28
Texas A&M	3	3	0	6	12

- Date: January 1
- Location: Cotton Bowl
- Game attendance: 74,188
- TV announcers (CBS): Verne Lundquist, Ara Parseghian, and Pat Haden

== Roster ==
1986 Texas A&M Aggies football team roster
Players
Coaches
Offense

Pos.	#	Name	Class
TE	29	Rod Bernstine	Sr
QB	14	Kevin Murray	Sr
QB		Craig Stump
QB	9	Duke Newton
RB	42	Ira Valentine	Sr
RB	43	Roger Vick	Sr
WR	30	Karl Pitts	So
WR		Shea Walker
RB		Keith Woodside

Defense

Pos.	#	Name	Class
LB	11	Johnny Holland	Sr
LB	65	Larry Kelm	Sr
DT	99	Rod Saddler	Sr

Special teams

Pos.	#	Name	Class

Head coach

- Jackie Sherrill

Coordinators/assistant coaches

- Lynn Amedee (OC)
- R. C. Slocum (DC)
- George Pugh (assistant)

Legend

- (C) Team captain
- (S) Suspended
- (I) Ineligible
- Injured
- Redshirt

== 1987 NFL draft ==
Player	Position	Round	Pick	NFL club
Roger Vick	Running back	1	21	New York Jets
Rod Bernstine	Running back	1	24	San Diego Chargers
Johnny Holland	Linebacker	2	41	Green Bay Packers
Todd Howard	Linebacker	3	73	Kansas City Chiefs
Rod Saddler	Defensive tackle	4	90	St. Louis Cardinals
Larry Kelm	Linebacker	4	108	Los Angeles Rams
Steve Bullitt	Linebacker	8	220	Cleveland Browns
Ira Valentine	Running back	12	314	Houston Oilers
