= 1986 Arkansas State Indians football team =

American college football season

1986 Arkansas State Indians football

Southland champion

NCAA Division I-AA Championship, L 21–48 vs. Georgia Southern
- Conference: Southland Conference
- Record: 12–2–1 (5–0 Southland)
- Head coach: Larry Lacewell (8th season)
- Home stadium: Indian Stadium

1986 Southland Conference football standings
	Conf.					Overall
Team	W		L		T	W		L		T
No. 2 Arkansas State $^	5	–	0	–	0	12	–	2	–	1
North Texas State	3	–	2	–	0	6	–	4	–	0
Louisiana Tech	3	–	2	–	0	6	–	4	–	1
Northeast Louisiana	3	–	2	–	0	5	–	6	–	0
McNeese State	1	–	4	–	0	2	–	9	–	0
Lamar	0	–	5	–	0	2	–	9	–	0
$ – Conference champion; ^ – NCAA Division I-AA playoff participant; Rankings from NCAA Division I-AA Football Committee poll

The 1986 Arkansas State Indians football team represented Arkansas State University as a member of the Southland Conference during the 1986 NCAA Division I-AA football season. Led by eighth-year head coach Larry Lacewell, the Indians compiled an overall record of 12–2–1 with a mark of 5–0 in conference play, winning the Southland title for the second consecutive season. Arkansas State advanced to the advanced to the NCAA Division I-AA Football Championship playoffs, where they defeated Sam Houston State, Delaware, and Eastern Kentucky en route to the NCAA Division I-AA Championship Game, where they were defeated by Georgia Southern.

== Schedule ==
Date	Opponent	Rank	Site	Result	Attendance	Source
August 30	Southern Illinois*	No. 7	Indian Stadium; Jonesboro, AR	W 22–7	16,321	
September 6	Northwestern State*	No. 7	Indian Stadium; Jonesboro, AR	W 21–0	16,419	
September 13	at Memphis State*	No. 7	Liberty Bowl Memorial Stadium; Memphis, TN (rivalry)	W 30–10	36,510	
September 20	at Ole Miss*	No. 2	Vaught–Hemingway Stadium; Oxford, MS	T 10–10	26,500	
September 27	East Texas State*	No. 2	Indian Stadium; Jonesboro, AR	W 44–0	16,889	
October 11	at No. 19 (I-A) Mississippi State*	No. 2	Scott Field; Starkville, MS	L 9–24	33,500	
October 18	at No. 20 Louisiana Tech	No. 5	Joe Aillet Stadium; Ruston, LA	W 20–17	17,800	
October 25	McNeese State	No. 4	Indian Stadium; Jonesboro, AR	W 23–14		
November 8	at North Texas State	No. 2	Fouts Field; Denton, TX	W 43–21	16,100	
November 15	Lamar^{†}	No. 2	Indian Stadium; Jonesboro, AR	W 56–7		
November 22	Northeast Louisiana	No. 2	Indian Stadium; Jonesboro, AR	W 26–21	10,086	
November 29	No. 11 Sam Houston State*	No. 2	Indian Stadium; Jonesboro, AR (NCAA Division I-AA First Round)	W 48–7	4,500	
December 6	at No. 13 Delaware*	No. 2	Delaware Stadium; Newark, DE (NCAA Division I-AA Quarterfinal)	W 55–14	12,018	
December 13	No. 10 Eastern Kentucky*	No. 2	Indian Stadium; Jonesboro, AR (NCAA Division I-AA Semifinal)	W 24–10	10,500	
December 19	vs. No. 4 Georgia Southern*	No. 2	Tacoma Dome; Tacoma, WA (NCAA Division I-AA Championship Game)	L 21–48	4,419	
*Non-conference game; ^{†}Homecoming; Rankings from NCAA Division I-AA Football Committee Poll released prior to the game
