= 1986 North Texas State Mean Green football team =

American college football season

1986 North Texas State Mean Green football
- Conference: Southland Conference
- Record: 6–4 (3–2 Southland)
- Head coach: Corky Nelson (5th season)
- Home stadium: Fouts Field

1986 Southland Conference football standings
	Conf.					Overall
Team	W		L		T	W		L		T
No. 2 Arkansas State $^	5	–	0	–	0	12	–	2	–	1
North Texas State	3	–	2	–	0	6	–	4	–	0
Louisiana Tech	3	–	2	–	0	6	–	4	–	1
Northeast Louisiana	3	–	2	–	0	5	–	6	–	0
McNeese State	1	–	4	–	0	2	–	9	–	0
Lamar	0	–	5	–	0	2	–	9	–	0
$ – Conference champion; ^ – NCAA Division I-AA playoff participant; Rankings from NCAA Division I-AA Football Committee poll

The 1986 North Texas State Mean Green football team was an American football team that represented North Texas State University (now known as the University of North Texas) during the 1986 NCAA Division I-AA football season as a member of the Southland Conference. In their fifth year under head coach Corky Nelson, the team compiled a 6–4 record.

== Schedule ==
Date	Opponent	Site	Result	Attendance	Source
September 6	at Southwest Texas State*	Bobcat Stadium; San Marcos, TX	W 7–0		
September 20	at No. 16 (I-A) Texas A&M*	Kyle Field; College Station, TX	L 28–48	54,406	
September 27	McNeese State	Fouts Field; Denton, TX	W 21–13	14,800	
October 4	at Louisiana Tech	Joe Aillet Stadium; Ruston, LA	L 10–17	17,300	
October 11	Northwestern State*	Fouts Field; Denton, TX	W 24–3	13,600	
October 18	at TCU*	Amon G. Carter Stadium; Fort Worth, TX	W 24–20	16,021	
October 25	at Lamar	Cardinal Stadium; Beaumont, TX	W 33–13	3,121	
November 1	at UNLV*	Sam Boyd Silver Bowl; Whitney, NV	L 26–27	12,131	
November 8	No. 2 Arkansas State^{†}	Fouts Field; Denton, TX	L 21–43	16,100	
November 15	Northeast Louisiana	Fouts Field; Denton, TX	W 28–20	6,420	
*Non-conference game; ^{†}Homecoming; Rankings from NCAA Division I-AA Football Committee Poll released prior to the game
