= 1986 Independence Bowl =

Texas Tech Red Raiders	Ole Miss Rebels
(7–4)	(7–3–1)
SWC	SEC
17	20
Head coach: Spike Dykes (interim)	Head coach: Billy Brewer
	1	2	3	4	Total
Texas Tech	0	7	7	3	17
Ole Miss	7	10	0	3	20
- Date: December 20, 1986
- Season: 1986
- Stadium: Independence Stadium
- Location: Shreveport, Louisiana
- MVP: QB Mark Young, Ole Miss; DE James Mosley, Texas Tech
- Referee: Larry Rice (PCAA)
- Attendance: 46,369

United States TV coverage
- Network: Mizlou
- Announcers: Howard David; Bob Casciola; Steve Grad

The 1986 Independence Bowl was a college football postseason bowl game between the Ole Miss Rebels and the Texas Tech Red Raiders.

== Background ==
The Rebels finished tied for 2nd in the Southeastern Conference in their first bowl game since 1983, which was also in the Independence Bowl. David McWilliams left Texas Tech for the University of Texas prior to the bowl game, leaving the job to Spike Dykes in the first bowl game for the Red Raiders since 1977.

Coincidentally, Steve Sloan coached the Red Raiders from 1975-77 before leaving Lubbock to become Ole Miss' coach. Sloan, a two-time national champion quarterback at Alabama alongside Joe Namath and Ken Stabler, spent five seasons in Oxford.

== Game summary ==
=== First quarter ===
- Ole Miss: Willie Goodloe 1 run (Owen kick) – 7-0 Ole Miss

=== Second quarter ===
- Ole Miss: Joe Mickles 9 run (Owen kick) – 14-0 Ole Miss
- Ole Miss: Owen 21 field goal – 17-0 Ole Miss
- Texas Tech: James Gray 1 run (Segrist kick) – 17-7 Ole Miss

=== Third quarter ===
- Texas Tech: Merv Scurlark 33 interception return (Segrist kick) – 17-14 Ole Miss

=== Fourth quarter ===
- Texas Tech: Segrist 19 field goal – 17-17 tie
- Ole Miss: Owen 48 field goal – 20-17 Ole Miss

== Aftermath ==
Dykes remained the Red Raiders head coach until 1999, reaching six more bowl games, with the last being against Ole Miss, in 1998. Ole Miss reached four more bowl games with Brewer before he was fired in 1993.

== Statistics ==
Statistics	Ole Miss	Texas Tech
First downs	26	18
Rushing yards	60	175
Passing yards	343	181
Interceptions	1	1
Total yards	403	356
Fumbles–lost	1–1	2–0
Penalties–yards	5–33	5–60
Punts–average	6–45.5	8–41.5
