= 1986 Bluebonnet Bowl =

Colorado Buffaloes	Baylor Bears
(6–5)	(8–3)
9	21
Head coach: Bill McCartney	Head coach: Grant Teaff
	AP / Coaches; 14 / 16
	1	2	3	4	Total
Colorado	0	3	6	0	9
Baylor	7	7	7	0	21
- Date: December 31, 1986
- Season: 1986
- Stadium: Rice Stadium
- Location: Houston, Texas
- MVP: Ray Berry (Baylor)
- Referee: Robert Carpenter (ACC)
- Attendance: 40,470

United States TV coverage
- Network: Raycom
- Announcers: Merle Harmon and Kevin Kiley

The 1986 Bluebonnet Bowl was a college football postseason bowl game that featured the Colorado Buffaloes and the Baylor Bears.

== Background ==
The Bears had been ranked as high as 9th in the polls, but 3 losses in a 5-game span had dropped them out of the polls. However a victory over Arkansas started a four-game winning streak to end the regular season tied for 2nd in the Southwest Conference, and the Bears were in their fourth bowl of the decade. Even though they started the season 0–4, Colorado rallied to finish 2nd in the Big Eight Conference (their highest finish since 1976) with 5 straight conference wins, highlighted by their first victory over Nebraska since 1967. This was their 2nd straight bowl game appearance and first Bluebonnet Bowl since 1975.

== Game summary ==
A 12-play, 64-yard drive (which had been lengthened by a Colorado penalty on a punt) was culminated with a Derrick McAdoo touchdown plunge on 4th and Goal to make it 7–0 Baylor with 3:34 remaining in the 1st quarter. Dave DeLine made it 7–3 on his 36-yard field goal with 13:09 remaining in the 2nd quarter. A fumble by the Buffaloes on their own 8 (recovered by Keith Rose) led to a Cody Carlson touchdown pass to Darnell Chase to make it 14–3 with 4:57 remaining in the half. On the second play of the second half, a Robert Watters sack led to a Colorado fumble, and Ray Berry recovered the ball at the 21. Four plays later, McAdoo scored on another touchdown plunge to make it 21–3 with 12:56 remaining in the 3rd. Mark Hatcher scrambled 31 yards for a touchdown run to narrow it to 21-9 (after the conversion run failed) with 2:38 in the 3rd. Colorado had two drives in the fourth that were stopped by Baylor, as the Bears held on to win. Ray Berry had 12 tackles in an MVP effort.

== Scoring summary ==
- McAdoo 1 run (Syler kick)
- DeLine 36 FG
- Chase 2 pass from Carlson (Syler kick)
- McAdoo 1 run (Syler kick)
- Hatcher 31 run (run failed)

== Aftermath ==
Baylor did not play in a bowl again until 1991, while the Buffaloes took a year off before their next bowl appearance in 1988. As it turned out, this was the final Bluebonnet Bowl played at Rice Stadium, and the final one ever under the game's original name, as it would move back to the Astrodome as the Astro-Bluebonnet Bowl for the next year in the game which turned out to be the last Bluebonnet Bowl.

== Statistics ==
Statistics	Baylor	Colorado
First downs	12	12
Rushing yards	114	83
Passing yards	165	111
Total offense	279	194
Interceptions thrown	2	1
Punts–average	7–31.1	5–37.6
Fumbles–lost	2–0	6–3
Penalty–yards	7–58	4–25
3rd-down conversions	6-of-19	4-of-14
Time of possession	31:09	28:51
