= Ray Berry =

American football player (born 1963)

No. 50, 57
- Position: Linebacker

Personal information
- Born: October 28, 1963 (age 63); Lovington, New Mexico, U.S.
- Listed height: 6 ft 2 in (1.88 m)
- Listed weight: 227 lb (103 kg)

Career information
- High school: Cooper (Abilene, Texas)
- College: Baylor
- NFL draft: 1987: 2nd round, 44th overall pick

Career history
- Minnesota Vikings (1987–1992); Seattle Seahawks (1993)

Awards and highlights
- First-team All-SWC (1986); 1986 Bluebonnet Bowl MVP

Career NFL statistics
- Games played-started: 89-31
- Sacks: 4
- Interceptions: 1
- Stats at Pro Football Reference

Raymond Lenn Berry (born October 28, 1963) is an American former professional football player who was a linebacker in the National Football League (NFL). He played college football for the Baylor Bears before seven seasons in the NFL for the Minnesota Vikings from 1987 to 1992 and the Seattle Seahawks in 1993.

== Career ==
Berry played his high school football for the O.H. Cooper High School Cougars in Abilene, Texas and was named as a Parade Magazine High School All-American as a senior during the 1981–1982 school year. (See, Abilene Reporter News, May 12, 1982, page 2C)

At Baylor University, Berry was named as Sports Illustrated College Football Defensive Player of the Week for his role, including a game-saving interception near the end of the game, in Baylor's upset of #2 ranked University of Southern California in Los Angeles. He was selected by the Minnesota Vikings in the second round with the 44th overall pick in the 1987 NFL draft.

Pre-draft measurables
Height	Weight	Arm length	Hand span	40-yard dash	10-yard split	20-yard split	20-yard shuttle	Vertical jump	Broad jump	Bench press
6 ft 2 1/2 in (1.89 m)	226 lb (103 kg)	31 in (0.79 m)	9 1/4 in (0.23 m)	4.85 s	1.70 s	2.82 s	4.47 s	28.5 in (0.72 m)	8 ft 9 in (2.67 m)	22 reps
All values from NFL Combine

In 2005, Berry was inducted into the Baylor Athletics Hall of Honor and was named as a Legend of Baylor Football in 2007.
