= 1986 Nevada Wolf Pack football team =

American college football season

1986 Nevada Wolf Pack football

Big Sky champion

NCAA Division I-AA Semifinal, L 38–48 vs. Georgia Southern
- Conference: Big Sky Conference

Ranking
- AP: No. 1
- Record: 13–1 (7–0 Big Sky)
- Head coach: Chris Ault (11th season)
- Home stadium: Mackay Stadium

1986 Big Sky Conference football standings
	Conf.					Overall
Team	W		L		T	W		L		T
No. 1 Nevada $^	7	–	0	–	0	13	–	1	–	0
No. 16 Idaho ^	8	–	2	–	0	8	–	4	–	0
Northern Arizona	5	–	2	–	0	7	–	4	–	0
Montana *	4	–	4	–	0	6	–	4	–	0
Boise State	3	–	4	–	0	5	–	6	–	0
Weber State	2	–	5	–	0	3	–	8	–	0
Montana State	2	–	5	–	0	3	–	8	–	0
Idaho State *	1	–	7	–	0	2	–	9	–	0
$ – Conference champion; ^ – NCAA Division I-AA playoff participant; * – Montana and Idaho State played twice.; Rankings from NCAA Division I-AA Poll

The 1986 Nevada Wolf Pack football team represented the University of Nevada, Reno during the 1986 NCAA Division I-AA football season. Nevada competed as a member of the Big Sky Conference (BSC). The Wolf Pack were led by 11th-year head coach Chris Ault and played their home games at Mackay Stadium.

== Schedule ==
Date	Opponent	Rank	Site	Result	Attendance	Source
August 30	Cal State Fullerton*	No. 2	Mackay Stadium; Reno, NV	W 49–3	13,062	
September 6	Sam Houston State*	No. 2	Mackay Stadium; Reno, NV	W 35–7	11,680	
September 20	Montana	No. 1	Mackay Stadium; Reno, NV	W 51–17	12,450	
September 27	at Montana State	No. 1	Reno H. Sales Stadium; Bozeman, MT	W 61–10	11,637	
October 4	at Weber State	No. 1	Wildcat Stadium; Ogden, UT	W 38–24	9,037	
October 11	Stephen F. Austin*	No. 1	Mackay Stadium; Reno, NV	W 34–27	13,242	
October 18	No. 12 Idaho	No. 1	Mackay Stadium; Reno, NV	W 17–13	13,825	
October 25	Eastern Washington*^{†}	No. 1	Mackay Stadium; Reno, NV	W 56–22	14,420	
November 1	at Idaho State	No. 1	ASISU Minidome; Pocatello, ID	W 44–14	7,551	
November 8	at Boise State	No. 1	Bronco Stadium; Boise, ID (rivalry)	W 21–16	17,934	
November 15	Northern Arizona	No. 1	Mackay Stadium; Reno, NV	W 27–17	15,425	
November 29	No. 16 Idaho*	No. 1	Mackay Stadium; Reno, NV (NCAA Division I-AA First Round)	W 27–7	13,715	
December 6	No. 14 Tennessee State*	No. 1	Mackay Stadium; Reno, NV (NCAA Division I-AA Quarterfinal)	W 33–6	13,102	
December 13	No. 4 Georgia Southern*	No. 1	Mackay Stadium; Reno, NV (NCAA Division I-AA Semifinal)	L 38–48	15,100	
*Non-conference game; ^{†}Homecoming; Rankings from NCAA Division I-AA Football Committee Poll released prior to the game
