= 1986 Arkansas Razorbacks football team =

American college football season

1986 Arkansas Razorbacks football

Orange Bowl, L 8–42 vs. Oklahoma
- Conference: Southwest Conference

Ranking
- Coaches: No. 16
- AP: No. 15
- Record: 9–3 (6–2 SWC)
- Head coach: Ken Hatfield (3rd season)
- Offensive scheme: Option
- Defensive coordinator: Fred Goldsmith (3rd season)
- Captains: James Shibest; Derrick Thomas; Theo Young
- Home stadium: Razorback Stadium; War Memorial Stadium

1986 Southwest Conference football standings
	Conf.					Overall
Team	W		L		T	W		L		T
No. 13 Texas A&M $	7	–	1	–	0	9	–	3	–	0
No. 15 Arkansas	6	–	2	–	0	9	–	3	–	0
No. 12 Baylor	6	–	2	–	0	9	–	3	–	0
Texas Tech	5	–	3	–	0	7	–	5	–	0
SMU	5	–	3	–	0	6	–	5	–	0
Texas	4	–	4	–	0	5	–	6	–	0
Rice	2	–	6	–	0	4	–	7	–	0
TCU	1	–	7	–	0	3	–	8	–	0
Houston	0	–	8	–	0	1	–	10	–	0
$ – Conference champion; Rankings from AP Poll

The 1986 Arkansas Razorbacks football team represented the University of Arkansas as a member of the Southwest Conference (SWC) during the 1986 NCAA Division I-A football season. Led by third-year head coach Ken Hatfield, the Razorbacks compiled an overall record of 9–3 with a mark of 6–2 in conference play, tying for second place in the SWC. Arkansas was invited to the Orange Bowl, where the Razorbacks lost to Oklahoma. The team played home games at Razorback Stadium in Fayetteville, Arkansas and War Memorial Stadium in Little Rock, Arkansas.

== Schedule ==
Date	Opponent	Rank	Site	TV	Result	Attendance	Source
September 13	Ole Miss*	No. 18	War Memorial Stadium; Little Rock, AR (rivalry)		W 21–0	55,230	
September 20	Tulsa*	No. 12	Razorback Stadium; Fayetteville, AR		W 34–17	51,080	
September 27	New Mexico State*	No. 9	War Memorial Stadium; Little Rock, AR		W 42–11	55,106	
October 4	TCU	No. 8	Razorback Stadium; Fayetteville, AR	Raycom	W 34–17	41,808	
October 11	Texas Tech	No. 8	Razorback Stadium; Fayetteville, AR (rivalry)		L 7–17	49,012	
October 18	at Texas	No. 14	Texas Memorial Stadium; Austin, TX (rivalry)	ESPN	W 21–14	67,344	
October 25	at Houston	No. 14	Houston Astrodome; Houston, TX		W 30–13	16,060	
November 1	Rice^{†}	No. 13	Razorback Stadium; Fayetteville, AR		W 45–14	49,980	
November 8	at Baylor	No. 10	Baylor Stadium; Waco, TX	Raycom	L 14–29	44,500	
November 15	No. 7 Texas A&M	No. 17	War Memorial Stadium; Little Rock, AR (rivalry)	ABC	W 14–10	54,912	
November 22	at SMU	No. 11	Texas Stadium; Irving, TX		W 41–0	33,382	
January 1	vs. No. 3 Oklahoma*	No. 9	Miami Orange Bowl; Miami, FL (Orange Bowl)	NBC	L 8–42	52,717	
*Non-conference game; ^{†}Homecoming; Rankings from AP Poll released prior to the game

== Rankings ==
Ranking movements Legend: ██ Increase in ranking ██ Decrease in ranking
	Week														
Poll	Pre	1	2	3	4	5	6	7	8	9	10	11	12	13	Final
AP	19	18	12	9	8	8	14	14	13	10	17	11	9	9	15
Coaches	14	15	12	9	9	10	13	13	13	9	16	13	10	10	16

== Game summaries ==
=== Vs. Oklahoma (Orange Bowl) ===
#9 Arkansas vs. #3 Oklahoma

Team	1	2	3	4	Total
Arkansas	0	0	0	8	8
• Oklahoma	0	14	14	14	42

- Date: January 1
- Location: Orange Bowl
- Game attendance: 52,717
- Television network: NBC

Scoring summary
2	OU	Tillman 77-yard run (Lashar kick)	OU 7-0
2	OU	Tillman 21-yard run (Lashar kick)	OU 14-0
3	OU	Holieway 2-yard run (Lashar kick)	OU 21-0
3	OU	Holieway 4-yard run (Lashar kick)	OU 28-0
4	OU	Stafford 13-yard run (Lashar kick)	OU 35-0
4	OU	Parham 49-yard run (Lashar kick)	OU 42-0
4	ARK	D. Thomas 1-yard run (Bland to Shibest pass)	OU 42-8

== Personnel ==
1986 Arkansas Razorbacks football team roster
Players
Coaches
Offense

Pos.	#	Name	Class
OL		Chris Bequette
QB		John Bland
RB		J.R. Brown
WR		Donnie Centers
RB		Anthony Chambers
G	72	Freddie Childress	So
QB		Jay Cleveland
RB		Marshall Foreman
RB		David Gunn
RB		Tony Holmes
TE		Tim Horton
RB		Aaron Jackson
RB		Joe Johnson
TE		Jim Kessinger
RB		Kenn Massa
OL		Limbo Parks
RB		James Rouse
WR		James Shibest (C)
QB		Jim Simpson
OL		David Smart
RB		Wayne Stewart
RB		Derrick Thomas (C)
QB		Greg Thomas
RB		Sammy Van Dyke
OL		Bryan White
TE		Billy Winston
TE		Theo Young (C)

Defense

Pos.	#	Name	Class
S	27	Steve Atwater	So
DL		Carl Bradford
DB		Eric Bradford
DB		Richard Brothers	So
DL		Tony Cherico
LB		David Dudley
LB		Albert Harris
DB		Odis Lloyd
DL		Wayne Martin
DL		Kerry Owens
DL		David Schell
DB		Charles Washington
LB		Erik Whitted
LB		Rickey Williams

Special teams

Pos.	#	Name	Class
P		Greg Horne
K	22	Kendall Trainor	So

Head coach

- Ken Hatfield

Coordinators/assistant coaches

- Wally Ake
- Larry Beckman
- Larry Brinson
- Fred Goldsmith
- Jim Goodman
- Roger Hinshaw
- David Lee
- Bob Trott
- Ken Turner

Legend

- (C) Team captain
- (S) Suspended
- (I) Ineligible
- Injured
- Redshirt

== Awards ==
- All-Americans: Greg Horne (AFCA, 1st)
- All-SWC: Steve Atwater (1st), Freddie Childress (1st), James Shibest (1st)
