= 1987 Cotton Bowl Classic =

- 51st Cotton Bowl Classic
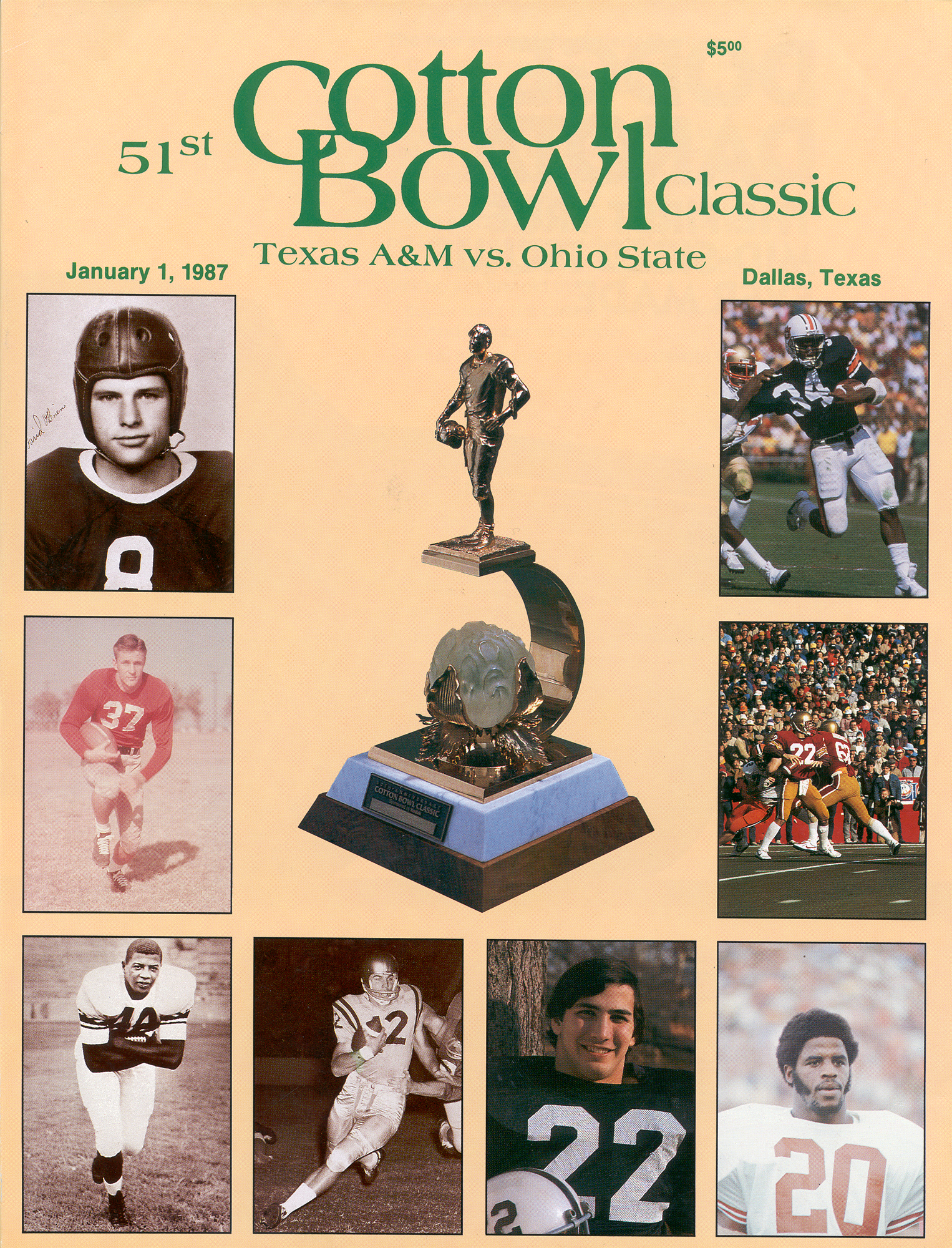
Ohio State Buckeyes	Texas A&M Aggies
(9–3)	(9–2)
Big Ten	SWC
28	12
Head coach: Earle Bruce	Head coach: Jackie Sherrill
AP / Coaches; 11 / 12	AP / Coaches; 8 / 7
	1	2	3	4	Total
Ohio State	0	7	14	7	28
Texas A&M	3	3	0	6	12
- Date: January 1, 1987
- Season: 1986
- Stadium: Cotton Bowl
- Location: Dallas, Texas
- MVP: Chris Spielman (OSU LB); Roger Vick (Texas A&M FB)
- Favorite: Texas A&M by 2½ points
- Referee: Jim Garvey (Eastern Independent)
- Attendance: 74,188

United States TV coverage
- Network: CBS
- Announcers: Verne Lundquist, Ara Parseghian, Pat Haden

The Cotton Bowl in Dallas, Texas, hosted the Cotton Bowl Classic.

The 1987 Cotton Bowl Classic was the 51st edition of the college football bowl game, played at the Cotton Bowl in Dallas, Texas, on Thursday, January 1. Part of the 1986–87 bowl game season, it matched the eleventh-ranked Ohio State of the Big Ten Conference and the #8 Texas A&M Aggies of the Southwest Conference (SWC). A slight underdog, Ohio State won by sixteen points, 28–12.

== Teams ==
This was the first Cotton Bowl appearance by a team from the Big Ten Conference.

=== Ohio State ===
The Buckeyes were co-champions of the Big Ten with Michigan, to whom they lost 26–24 on November 22. Ohio State hadn't played a Southwest Conference team since the season opener in 1982.

=== Texas A&M ===
Texas A&M won their second consecutive Southwest Conference championship under Sherrill. A&M aimed to become the second team to win consecutive Cotton Bowls (the first was Texas in January 1970).

== Game summary ==
Televised by CBS, the game kicked off shortly after 12:30 p.m. CST, ninety minutes after the Florida Citrus Bowl, and two hours before the Sugar Bowl, both on ABC.

It was a close game early and Ohio State led 7–6 at halftime. Scott Slater kicked two field goals for the Aggies contrasted with Jim Karsatos's touchdown run. But the second half is where Ohio State and their defense shone; on the third play of the half, linebacker Chris Spielman intercepted a Kevin Murray pass and returned it 24 yards for a touchdown. When the Aggies tried to drive again, rover Sonny Gordon intercepted the ball, his second of the game. Vince Workman capped Ohio State's drive with his 8-yard run midway through the third quarter for a 21–6 Buckeyes' lead.

In the fourth quarter, Aggie Roger Vick scored from two yards out, but the two-point conversion attempt was ruled out of bounds, and the Ohio State lead was 21–12 with nine minutes to go. When A&M tried to drive with three minutes to go, linebacker Michael Kee intercepted and returned it 49 yards for a touchdown to seal the win. Despite having less first downs, three passes picked off, and more penalties than A&M, it was Ohio State's defense that was the difference with five interceptions, two returned for touchdowns, and one that led to a touchdown.

=== Scoring ===
First quarter

- Texas A&M – Scott Slater 30-yard field goal

Second quarter

- Ohio State – Jim Karsatos 3-yard run (Matt Frantz kick)
- Texas A&M – Slater 44-yard field goal

Third quarter

- Ohio State – Chris Spielman 24-yard interception return (Frantz kick)
- Ohio State – Vince Workman 3-yard run (Frantz kick)

Fourth quarter

- Texas A&M – Roger Vick 2-yard run (pass failed)
- Ohio State – Michael Kee 49-yard interception return (Frantz kick)

== Statistics ==
Statistics	Ohio State	Texas A&M
First downs	16	18
Yards Rushing	36–85	42–160
Yards Passing	218	136
Passing (C–A–I)	13–29–3	13–33–5
Total Offense	65–303	75–296
Return yards	94	26
Punts–Average	6–35.2	6–42.2
Fumbles–Lost	1–0	1–0
Turnovers	3	5
Penalties–Yards	11–70	3–15
Time of possession	28:37	31:23

== Aftermath ==
The next season, A&M returned to the Cotton Bowl for a third straight year, and won in Sherill's penultimate year as head coach. Ohio State went 6–4–1 in 1987 and fired Bruce. This was the last time Texas A&M and Ohio State met until the 1999 Sugar Bowl, which Ohio State won 24–14.

This was the last Cotton Bowl with a Big Ten team until Michigan State appeared in January 2015, against Baylor. In that game, Michigan State trailed 41–21 in the fourth quarter, then scored 21 unanswered points to pull off a stunning one-point win, the largest comeback in Cotton Bowl history. Ohio State returned in December 2017, where they defeated USC 24–7.
