= 1986 Texas Tech Red Raiders football team =

American college football season

1986 Texas Tech Red Raiders football

Independence Bowl, L 17–20 vs. Ole Miss
- Conference: Southwest Conference
- Record: 7–5 (5–3 SWC)
- Head coach: David McWilliams (1st season; regular season); Spike Dykes (bowl game)
- Offensive scheme: Multiple
- Defensive coordinator: Spike Dykes (3rd season)
- Base defense: 4–3
- Home stadium: Jones Stadium

1986 Southwest Conference football standings
	Conf.					Overall
Team	W		L		T	W		L		T
No. 13 Texas A&M $	7	–	1	–	0	9	–	3	–	0
No. 15 Arkansas	6	–	2	–	0	9	–	3	–	0
No. 12 Baylor	6	–	2	–	0	9	–	3	–	0
Texas Tech	5	–	3	–	0	7	–	5	–	0
SMU	5	–	3	–	0	6	–	5	–	0
Texas	4	–	4	–	0	5	–	6	–	0
Rice	2	–	6	–	0	4	–	7	–	0
TCU	1	–	7	–	0	3	–	8	–	0
Houston	0	–	8	–	0	1	–	10	–	0
$ – Conference champion; Rankings from AP Poll

The 1986 Texas Tech Red Raiders football team represented Texas Tech University as a memnber of the Southwest Conference (SWC) during the 1986 NCAA Division I-A football season. In their first and only season under head coach David McWilliams, the Red Raiders compiled a 7–4 record in the regular season (5–3 against SWC opponents) and finished in a tie for fourth place in the conference. The team was invited to play in the 1986 Independence Bowl and lost to Ole Miss, 20 to 17. The team was coached in the bowl game by Spike Dykes. Over the course of the full 1986 season, the team outscored opponents by a combined total of 271 to 268. The team played its home games at Clifford B. and Audrey Jones Stadium in Lubbock, Texas.

== Schedule ==
Date	Time	Opponent	Site	TV	Result	Attendance	Source
September 6	7:00 pm	Kansas State*	Jones Stadium; Lubbock, TX		W 41–7	37,842	
September 13	6:30 pm	at No. 2 Miami (FL)*	Miami Orange Bowl; Miami, FL		L 11–61	41,925	
September 20	7:00 pm	New Mexico*	Jones Stadium; Lubbock, TX		W 14–7	36,520	
September 27	12:00 pm	No. 17 Baylor^{†}	Jones Stadium; Lubbock, TX (rivalry)	Raycom	L 14–45	41,046	
October 4	1:30 pm	at No. 14 Texas A&M	Kyle Field; College Station, TX (rivalry)		L 8–45	62,876	
October 11	1:00 pm	at No. 8 Arkansas	Razorback Stadium; Fayetteville, AR (rivalry)		W 17–7	49,012	
October 18	12:00 pm	at Rice	Rice Stadium; Houston, TX	Raycom	W 49–21	18,000	
November 1	12:00 pm	Texas	Jones Stadium; Lubbock, TX (rivalry)	USA	W 23–21	44,820	
November 8	2:00 pm	at TCU	Amon G. Carter Stadium; Fort Worth, TX (rivalry)		W 36–14	25,729	
November 15	2:00 pm	SMU	Jones Stadium; Lubbock, TX		L 7–13	35,887	
November 22	2:00 pm	Houston	Jones Stadium; Lubbock, TX (rivalry)		W 34–7	30,196	
December 20	7:00 pm	vs. Ole Miss*	Independence Stadium; Shreveport, LA (Independence Bowl)	USA	L 17–20	46,369	
*Non-conference game; ^{†}Homecoming; Rankings from AP Poll released prior to the game; All times are in Central time
