= 1986 Big Ten Conference football season =

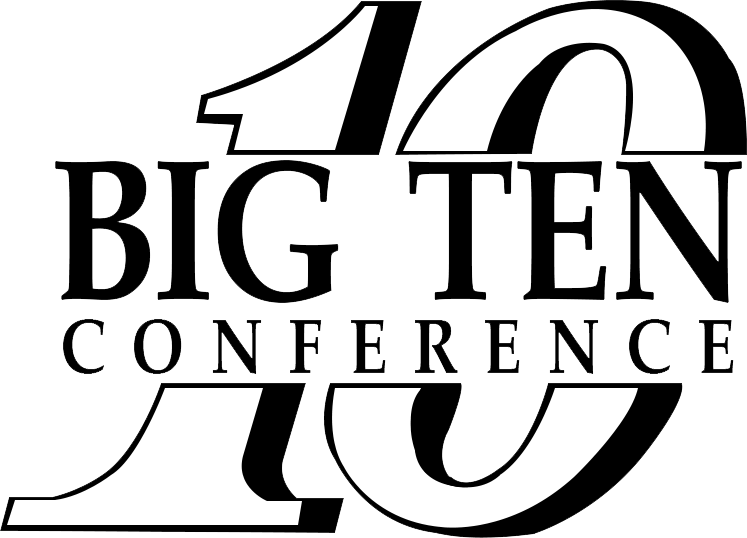
- League: NCAA Division I-A
- Sport: Football
- Teams: 10
- Co-champions: Michigan, Ohio State

Football seasons

1986 Big Ten Conference football standings
	Conf.					Overall
Team	W		L		T	W		L		T
No. 8 Michigan +	7	–	1	–	0	11	–	2	–	0
No. 7 Ohio State +	7	–	1	–	0	10	–	3	–	0
No. 16 Iowa	5	–	3	–	0	9	–	3	–	0
Minnesota	5	–	3	–	0	6	–	6	–	0
Michigan State	4	–	4	–	0	6	–	5	–	0
Indiana	3	–	5	–	0	6	–	6	–	0
Illinois	3	–	5	–	0	4	–	7	–	0
Northwestern	2	–	6	–	0	4	–	7	–	0
Purdue	2	–	6	–	0	3	–	8	–	0
Wisconsin	2	–	6	–	0	3	–	9	–	0
+ – Conference co-champions; Rankings from AP Poll

The 1986 Big Ten Conference football season was the 91st season of college football played by the member schools of the Big Ten Conference and was a part of the 1986 NCAA Division I-A football season.

== Regular season ==
With 7-1 Big Ten records, No. 8 Michigan and No. 7 Ohio State shared the 1986 conference title. Michigan won the head-to-head matchup and Ohio State had more recently been to the Rose Bowl, so Michigan was granted the invitation to the 1987 Rose Bowl, where they would lose to Arizona State 15-22. The Cotton Bowl took Ohio State, who defeated Texas A&M 28-12.

No. 16 Iowa and Minnesota tied for third with 5-3 Big Ten records. Michigan State came in fifth at 4-4 (6-5 overall).

Indiana and Illinois tied for sixth at 3-5 each, while Northwestern, Purdue, and Wisconsin tied for eighth place with 2-6 conference records.

== Bowl games ==
Five Big Ten teams played in bowl games, with the conference going 2-3 overall:

- Rose Bowl: No. 7 Arizona State 22, No. 4 Michigan 15
- Cotton Bowl: No. 11 Ohio State 28, No. 8 Texas A&M 12
- Holiday Bowl: No. 19 Iowa 39, San Diego State 38
- All-American Bowl: Florida State 27, Indiana 13
- Liberty Bowl: Tennessee 21, Minnesota 14
