= 1986 Michigan State Spartans football team =

American college football season

1986 Michigan State Spartans football
- Conference: Big Ten Conference
- Record: 6–5 (4–4 Big Ten)
- Head coach: George Perles (4th season)
- Offensive coordinator: Morris Watts (1st season)
- Defensive coordinator: Nick Saban (4th season)
- MVPs: Mark Ingram; Dave Yarema
- Captains: Shane Bullough; Dave Yarema
- Home stadium: Spartan Stadium

1986 Big Ten Conference football standings
	Conf.					Overall
Team	W		L		T	W		L		T
No. 8 Michigan +	7	–	1	–	0	11	–	2	–	0
No. 7 Ohio State +	7	–	1	–	0	10	–	3	–	0
No. 16 Iowa	5	–	3	–	0	9	–	3	–	0
Minnesota	5	–	3	–	0	6	–	6	–	0
Michigan State	4	–	4	–	0	6	–	5	–	0
Indiana	3	–	5	–	0	6	–	6	–	0
Illinois	3	–	5	–	0	4	–	7	–	0
Northwestern	2	–	6	–	0	4	–	7	–	0
Purdue	2	–	6	–	0	3	–	8	–	0
Wisconsin	2	–	6	–	0	3	–	9	–	0
+ – Conference co-champions; Rankings from AP Poll

The 1986 Michigan State Spartans football team was an American football team that represented Michigan State University as a member of the Big Ten Conference during the 1986 Big Ten football season. In their fourth season under head coach George Perles, the Spartans compiled a 6–5 record (4–4 in conference games), finished in fifth place in the Big Ten, and outscored opponents by a total of 285 to 197. In three games against ranked opponents, they defeated No. 20 Notre Dame, but lost to No. 11 Iowa and No. 4 Michigan.

Quarterback Dave Yarema led the Big Ten with 2,581 passing yards, a 67.3% completion percentage, and 16 passing touchdowns. The team's other statistical leaders included Lorenzo White with 633 rushing yards and wide receiver Andre Rison with 54 receptions and 966 receiving yards.

Eight Spartans were recognized by the Associated Press (AP) and/or the United Press International (UPI) on the 1986 All-Big Ten Conference football team: receiver Andre Rison (AP-1; UPI-1); punter Greg Montgomery (AP-1, UPI-1); linebacker Shane Bullough (AP-2, UPI-1); receiver Mark Ingram Sr. (AP-2, UPI-2); defensive tackle Mark Nichols (AP-2, UPI-2); running back Lorenzo White (UPI-2); quarterback Dave Yarema (UPI-2); and defensive end John Budde (AP-2).

The team played its home games at Spartan Stadium in East Lansing, Michigan.

== Schedule ==
Date	Time	Opponent	Rank	Site	TV	Result	Attendance	Source
September 13	10:18 p.m.	at Arizona State*	No. 20	Sun Devil Stadium; Tempe, AZ	TBS	L 17–20	70,689	
September 20	2:42 p.m.	No. 20 Notre Dame*		Spartan Stadium; East Lansing, MI (rivalry)	CBS	W 20–15	79,895	
September 27	1:00 p.m.	Western Michigan*	No. 19	Spartan Stadium; East Lansing, MI		W 45–10	65,907	
October 4	2:42 p.m.	No. 11 Iowa	No. 17	Spartan Stadium; East Lansing, MI	CBS	L 21–24	75,102	
October 11	2:42 p.m.	at No. 4 Michigan		Michigan Stadium; Ann Arbor, MI (rivalry)	CBS	L 6–27	106,141	
October 18	1:49 p.m.	at Illinois		Memorial Stadium; Champaign, IL	CBS	W 29–21	75,083	
October 25	1:00 p.m.	Purdue		Spartan Stadium; East Lansing, MI		W 37–3	77,063	
November 1	8:00 p.m.	at Minnesota		Hubert H. Humphrey Metrodome; Minneapolis, MN		W 52–23	57,408	
November 8	12:40 p.m.	Indiana		Spartan Stadium; East Lansing, MI (rivalry)	TNT	L 14–17	64,973	
November 15	2:00 p.m.	at Northwestern		Dyche Stadium; Evanston, IL		L 21–24	26,711	
November 22	12:40 p.m.	Wisconsin		Spartan Stadium; East Lansing, MI	TNT	W 23–13	60,285	
*Non-conference game; Rankings from AP Poll released prior to the game; All times are in Eastern time

== Game summaries ==
=== Purdue ===
Lorenzo White rushed for 79 yards on 19 carries in part-time duty in return from injury while the Spartans' defense intercepted four passes. White ran for first half touchdowns of three and one yards, respectively.

== Personnel ==
1986 Michigan State Spartans football team roster
Players
Coaches
Offense

Pos.	#	Name	Class
WR		Willie Bouyer
RB		Blake Ezor
TE		Rich Gicewicz
OL		Mark Hill
OL		David Houle
WR	11	Mark Ingram	Sr
RB		Craig Johnson
OL		Tony Mandarich
QB	8	Bobby McAllister	So
RB		James Moore
RB	21	Bobby Morse	Sr
RB		Joe Pugh
WR	1	Andre Rison	So
OL		Doug Rogers
OL		Mike Sargent
C	60	Pat Shurmur	Jr
OL		Vince Tata
RB	34	Lorenzo White	Jr
WR		Bernard Wilson
QB		Dave Yarema (C)

Defense

Pos.	#	Name	Class
DB		Dean Altobelli
DB	36	Harlon Barnett	Fr
DL		Joe Bergin
DB		Paul Bobbitt
DL		John Budde
LB	41	Shane Bullough	Sr
DB		Maurice Chamberlain
DL		Travis Davis
DB		Todd Krumm
LB		Kurt Larson
DB		John Miller
LB		Tim Moore
DL		Mark Nichols
DB		Ron Rowe
LB	48	Percy Snow	Fr
LB		Rob Stradley
DL		Jim Szymanski
DL		Dave Wolff

Special teams

Pos.	#	Name	Class
K		Chris Caudell	Sr
P	23	Greg Montgomery	Jr

Head coach

- George Perles

Coordinators/assistant coaches

- Nick Saban – Defensive coordinator

Legend

- (C) Team captain
- (S) Suspended
- (I) Ineligible
- Injured
- Redshirt
