= 1986 Iowa Hawkeyes football team =

American college football season

1986 Iowa Hawkeyes football

Holiday Bowl champion

Holiday Bowl, W 39–38 vs. San Diego State
- Conference: Big Ten Conference

Ranking
- Coaches: No. 15
- AP: No. 16
- Record: 9–3 (5–3 Big Ten)
- Head coach: Hayden Fry (8th season)
- Offensive coordinator: Bill Snyder (8th season)
- Offensive scheme: Pro-style
- Defensive coordinator: Bill Brashier (8th season)
- Base defense: 5–2
- MVP: Rick Bayless
- Captains: Dave Croston; George Davis; Jeff Drost; Ken Sims; Mark Vlasic
- Home stadium: Kinnick Stadium

1986 Big Ten Conference football standings
	Conf.					Overall
Team	W		L		T	W		L		T
No. 8 Michigan +	7	–	1	–	0	11	–	2	–	0
No. 7 Ohio State +	7	–	1	–	0	10	–	3	–	0
No. 16 Iowa	5	–	3	–	0	9	–	3	–	0
Minnesota	5	–	3	–	0	6	–	6	–	0
Michigan State	4	–	4	–	0	6	–	5	–	0
Indiana	3	–	5	–	0	6	–	6	–	0
Illinois	3	–	5	–	0	4	–	7	–	0
Northwestern	2	–	6	–	0	4	–	7	–	0
Purdue	2	–	6	–	0	3	–	8	–	0
Wisconsin	2	–	6	–	0	3	–	9	–	0
+ – Conference co-champions; Rankings from AP Poll

The 1986 Iowa Hawkeyes football team was an American football team that represented the University of Iowa as a member of the Big Ten Conference during the 1986 NCAA Division I-A football season. In their eighth year under head coach Hayden Fry, the Hawkeyes compiled a 9–3 record (5–3 in conference games), tied for third place in the Big Ten, and outscored opponents by a total of 352 to 176. The Hawekeys defeated No. 17 Michigan State, but lost to No. 4 Michigan and No. 17 Ohio State. They concluded the season with a victory over San Diego State in the 1986 Holiday Bowl. They were ranked No. 15 in the final UPI poll and No. 16 in the final AP poll.

The team's statistical leaders were quarterback Mark Vlasic with 1,234 passing yards, running back Rick Bayless with 1,040 rushing yards, and wide receiver Jim Mauro with 28 receptions for 581 yards. Offensive tackle Dave Croston received first-team honors on the 1986 All-America college football team. Five Iowa players received first-team honors on the 1986 All-Big Ten Conference football team: Croston (AP-1, UPI-1); running back Rick Bayless (AP-1); guard Bob Kratch (UPI-1); and linebackers Jeff Drost (AP-1, UPI-1) and Dave Haight (AP-1).

The team played its home games at Kinnick Stadium in Iowa City, Iowa.

== Schedule ==
Date	Time	Opponent	Rank	Site	TV	Result	Attendance	Source
September 13	11:30 a.m.	Iowa State*		Kinnick Stadium; Iowa City, IA (rivalry)	TBS	W 43–7	67,700	
September 20	1:00 p.m.	Northern Illinois*		Kinnick Stadium; Iowa City, IA		W 57–3	66,930	
September 27	1:00 p.m.	UTEP*	No. 15	Kinnick Stadium; Iowa City, IA		W 69–7	67,500	
October 4	2:30 p.m.	at No. 17 Michigan State	No. 11	Spartan Stadium; East Lansing, MI	CBS	W 24–21	75,102	
October 11	1:00 p.m.	Wisconsin	No. 10	Kinnick Stadium; Iowa City, IA (rivalry)		W 17–6	67,700	
October 18	2:30 p.m.	at No. 4 Michigan	No. 8	Michigan Stadium; Ann Arbor, MI	CBS	L 17–20	105,879	
October 25	1:00 p.m.	Northwestern	No. 11	Kinnick Stadium; Iowa City, IA		W 27–20	67,250	
November 1	11:30 a.m.	No. 17 Ohio State	No. 11	Kinnick Stadium; Iowa City, IA	TBS	L 10–31	67,640	
November 8	1:00 p.m.	at Illinois	No. 16	Memorial Stadium; Champaign, IL		L 16–20	75,190	
November 15	1:00 p.m.	Purdue		Kinnick Stadium; Iowa City, IA		W 42–14	67,321	
November 22	6:00 p.m.	at Minnesota		Hubert H. Humphrey Metrodome; Minneapolis, MN (rivalry)	TBS	W 30–27	65,018	
December 30	8:00 p.m.	vs. San Diego State*	No. 19	Jack Murphy Stadium; San Diego, CA (Holiday Bowl)	ESPN	W 39–38	59,473	
*Non-conference game; Rankings from AP Poll released prior to the game; All times are in Central time; Source:

== Rankings ==
Ranking movements Legend: ██ Increase in ranking ██ Decrease in ranking — = Not ranked RV = Received votes
	Week														
Poll	Pre	1	2	3	4	5	6	7	8	9	10	11	12	13	Final
AP	—	—	—	15	11	10	8	11	11	16	—	—	20	19	16
Coaches	18	20	14	13	11	11	8	12	12	16	RV	RV	RV	RV	15

== Game summaries ==
=== Iowa State ===
Iowa State at Iowa

Team	1	2	3	4	Total
Cyclones	0	0	0	7	7
• Hawkeyes	13	13	10	7	43

- Date: September 13
- Location: Kinnick Stadium, Iowa City, Iowa
- Game start: 11:40 a.m. CDT
- Elapsed time: 3:30
- Game attendance: 67,700
- Referee: Sam Maphis
- Television network: TBS
- Source: Box Score and Game Story

Scoring summary
1	11:23	Iowa	Houghtlin 32-yard field goal	Iowa 3–0
1	6:39	Iowa	Houghtlin 46-yard field goal	Iowa 6–0
1	0:34	Iowa	Mauro 43-yard pass from Vlasic (Houghtlin kick)	Iowa 13–0
2	11:30	Iowa	Hudson 1-yard run (pass failed)	Iowa 19–0
2	1:40	Iowa	Mauro 17-yard pass from Smith (Houghtlin kick)	Iowa 26–0
3	10:38	Iowa	Houghtlin 37-yard field goal	Iowa 29–0
3	3:24	Iowa	Mauro 47-yard pass from Vlasic (Houghtlin kick)	Iowa 36–0
4	11:29	Iowa	Bayless 32-yard run (Houghtlin kick)	Iowa 43–0
4	1:09	ISU	Brown 21-yard pass from Sadek (Frank kick)	Iowa 43–7

- IOWA: Hudson 20 Rush, 120 Yds
- IOWA: Mauro 5 Rec, 149 Yds

The victory over Iowa State was Hayden Fry's 53rd at Iowa, making him the winningest coach in Iowa history. Jim Mauro had three receiving touchdowns and Rob Houghtlin kicked three field goals to lead the Hawks. The Hawkeye defense limited Iowa State to 125 yards of total offense.

=== Northern Illinois ===
Northern Illinois at Iowa

Team	1	2	3	4	Total
Huskies	0	0	0	3	3
• Hawkeyes	15	21	14	7	57

- Date: September 20
- Location: Kinnick Stadium, Iowa City, Iowa
- Game start: 1:05 p.m. CDT
- Elapsed time: 2:45
- Game attendance: 66,930
- Referee: Jerry Hendrickson
- Source: Box Score

Scoring summary
1	14:33	Iowa	Hudson 42-yard run (Houghtlin kick)	Iowa 7–0
1	5:27	Iowa	Bayless 5-yard run (Flagg pass from Poholsky)	Iowa 15–0
2	13:46	Iowa	Bayless 87-yard run (Houghtlin kick)	Iowa 22–0
2	13:08	Iowa	Mauro 39-yard pass from Vlasic (Houghtlin kick)	Iowa 29–0
2	4:49	Iowa	Flagg 20-yard pass from Vlasic (Houghtlin kick)	Iowa 36–0
3	11:36	Iowa	Hudson 2-yard run (Houghtlin kick)	Iowa 43–0
3	1:13	Iowa	Bass 1-yard run (Houghtlin kick)	Iowa 50–0
4	9:27	Iowa	Bass 2-yard run (Houghtlin kick)	Iowa 57–0
4	1:18	NIU	Nelson 31-yard field goal	Iowa 57–3

Three Iowa running backs scored two touchdowns each as the Hawkeyes dominated the Huskies in this quick-moving game. For the second straight week, Iowa's opponent scored with just over a minute remaining in the game to avoid a shutout. Iowa held Northern Illinois to 159 yards of total offense.

=== UTEP ===
UTEP at #15 Iowa

Team	1	2	3	4	Total
Miners	7	0	0	0	7
• No. 15 Hawkeyes	21	20	14	14	69

- Date: September 27
- Location: Kinnick Stadium, Iowa City, Iowa
- Game start: 1:05 p.m. CDT
- Elapsed time: 2:50
- Game attendance: 67,500
- Referee: Gil Marchman
- Source: Box Score

Scoring summary
1	10:09	Iowa	Hudson 1-yard run (kick failed)	Iowa 6–0
1	6:46	Iowa	Bayless 1-yard run (Hudson pass from Poholsky)	Iowa 14–0
1	5:26	Iowa	Smith 34-yard pass from Vlasic (Houghtlin kick)	Iowa 21–0
1	1:54	UTEP	Adkison 9-yard pass from Garza (Jacke kick)	Iowa 21–7
2	13:53	Iowa	Smith 25-yard pass from Vlasic (Houghtlin kick)	Iowa 28–7
2	10:09	Iowa	Harmon 1-yard run (kick failed)	Iowa 34–7
2	0:34	Iowa	Bayless 4-yard run (Houghtlin kick)	Iowa 41–7
3	8:24	Iowa	Harberts 59-yard pass from McGwire (Houghtlin kick)	Iowa 48–7
3	5:42	Iowa	Harberts 54-yard pass from McGwire (Houghtlin kick)	Iowa 55–7
4	3:08	Iowa	Goodman 1-yard run (Houghtlin kick)	Iowa 62–7
4	0:28	Iowa	Ringer 33-yard run (Houghtlin kick)	Iowa 69–7

Three Hawkeyes scored two touchdowns each and the Iowa defense gave up just 150 yards in this route of UTEP.

=== Michigan State ===
#11 Iowa at #17 Michigan State

Team	1	2	3	4	Total
• Hawkeyes	14	0	7	3	24
Spartans	7	7	0	7	21

- Date: October 4
- Location: Spartan Stadium, East Lansing, Michigan
- Game attendance: 75,102
- Referee: John Neamon
- TV announcers (CBS): Brent Musburger and Ara Parseghian
- Source: Box Score and Game Story

Scoring summary
Q1		MSU	Ingram 27-yard pass from Yarema (Caudell kick)	MSU 7–0
Q1		IOWA	Bass 12-yard run (Houghtlin kick)	Tied 7–7
Q1		IOWA	Flagg 6-yard pass from Poholsky (Houghtlin kick)	IOWA 14–7
Q2		MSU	Ingram 22-yard pass from Yarema (Caudell kick)	Tied 14–14
Q3		IOWA	Mauro 50-yard pass from Poholsky (Houghtlin kick)	IOWA 21–14
Q4		IOWA	Houghtlin 42-yard field goal	IOWA 24–14
Q4	4:15	MSU	Ingram 8-yard pass from Yarema (Caudell kick)	IOWA 24–21

=== Wisconsin ===
Wisconsin at #10 Iowa

Team	1	2	3	4	Total
Badgers	3	0	3	0	6
• Hawkeyes	7	0	3	7	17

- Date: October 11
- Location: Kinnick Stadium, Iowa City, Iowa
- Game attendance: 67,700
- Source: Box Score and Game Story

Scoring summary
Q1	IOWA	Bayless 4 yard run (Houghtlin kick)	IOWA 7–0
Q1	WIS	Gregoire 27 yard field goal	IOWA 7–3
Q3	WIS	Gregoire 34 yard field goal	IOWA 7–6
Q3	IOWA	Houghtlin 39 yard field goal	IOWA 10–6
Q4	IOWA	Bayless 2 yard run (Houghtlin kick)	IOWA 17–6

- IOWA: Bass 22 Rush, 107 Yds

=== Michigan ===
#8 Iowa at #4 Michigan

Team	1	2	3	4	Total
Hawkeyes	7	3	0	7	17
• Wolverines	3	0	14	3	20

- Date: October 18
- Location: Michigan Stadium, Ann Arbor, Michigan
- Game attendance: 105,879
- Referee: Tom Quinn
- TV announcers (CBS): Brent Musburger, Ara Parseghian, and Pat O'Brien
- Source: Box Score and Game Story

Scoring summary
Q1		IOWA	Bass 1-yard run (Rob Houghtlin kick)	IOWA 7–0
Q1		Mich	Gillette 53-yard field goal	IOWA 7–3
Q2		IOWA	Rob Houghtlin 29-yard field goal	IOWA 10–3
Q3		Mich	G. White 25-yard pass from J. Harbaugh (Moons kick)	Tied 10–10
Q3		Mich	G. White 10-yard run (Moons kick)	Mich 17–10
Q4		IOWA	R. Smith 15-yard pass from Vlasic	Tied 17–17
Q4	0:00	Mich	Gillette 34-yard field goal	Mich 20–17

=== Northwestern ===
Northwestern at #11 Iowa

Team	1	2	3	4	Total
Wildcats	0	10	7	3	20
• Hawkeyes	10	7	10	0	27

- Date: October 25
- Location: Kinnick Stadium, Iowa City, Iowa
- Game attendance: 67,250
- Source: Box Score and Game Story

Scoring summary
Q1	IOWA	Houghtlin 44-yard field goal	IOWA 3–0
Q1	IOWA	Hudson 50-yard run (Houghtlin kick)	IOWA 10–0
Q2	IOWA	Early 93-yard pass from Vlasic (Houghtlin kick)	IOWA 17–0
Q2	NW	Duvic 32-yard field goal	IOWA 17–3
Q2	NW	Davenport 89-yard run (Duvic kick)	IOWA 17–10
Q3	NW	Robertson 34-yard pass from Greenfield (Duvic kick)	Tied 17–17
Q3	IOWA	Burke fumble recovery in end zone (Houghtlin kick)	IOWA 24–17
Q3	IOWA	Houghtlin 46-yard field goal	IOWA 27–17
Q4	NW	Duvic 27-yard field goal	IOWA 27–20

=== Ohio State ===
#17 Ohio State at #11 Iowa

Team	1	2	3	4	Total
• No. 17 Buckeyes	0	21	7	3	31
No. 11 Hawkeyes	7	0	3	0	10

- Date: November 1
- Location: Kinnick Stadium, Iowa City, Iowa
- Game start: 11:40 a.m. CST
- Elapsed time: 3:10
- Game attendance: 67,640
- Referee: Jim Kemerling
- TV announcers (TBS): Pete van Wieren and Ron Kramer
- Source: Box Score

Scoring summary
1	12:19	Iowa	Kerry Burt 17-yard interception return (Houghtlin kick)	Iowa 7–0
2	12:14	OSU	Cris Carter 72-yard pass from Jim Karsatos (Frantz kick)	Tied 7–7
2	9:50	OSU	George Cooper 9-yard run (Frantz kick)	OSU 14–7
2	5:58	OSU	Greg Rogan 31-yard fumble return (Frantz kick)	OSU 21–7
3	12:23	Iowa	Rob Houghtlin 20-yard field goal	OSU 21–10
3	6:20	OSU	Everett Ross 38-yard pass from Jim Karsatos (Frantz kick)	OSU 28–10
4	7:10	OSU	Matt Frantz 37-yard field goal	OSU 31–10

=== Illinois ===
#16 Iowa at Illinois

Team	1	2	3	4	Total
Hawkeyes	3	7	0	6	16
• Fighting Illini	0	0	7	13	20

- Date: November 8
- Location: Memorial Stadium (University of Illinois), Champaign, Illinois
- Game attendance: 75,190
- Source: Box Score and Game Story

Scoring summary
Q1	IOWA	Houghtlin 36-yard field goal	IOWA 3–0
Q2	IOWA	Hudson 2-yard run (Houghtlin kick)	IOWA 10–0
Q3	Illinois	Pierce 54-yard pass from Menkhausen (Siambekos kick)	IOWA 10–7
Q4	Illinois	Menkhausen 1-yard run (Siambekos kick)	Illinois 14–10
Q4	Illinois	Siambekos 29-yard field goal	Illinois 17–10
Q4	Illinois	Siambekos 42-yard field goal	Illinois 20–10
Q4	IOWA	Harmon 3-yard run (pass failed)	Illinois 20–16

=== Purdue ===
Purdue at Iowa

Team	1	2	3	4	Total
Boilermakers	7	0	0	7	14
• Hawkeyes	14	7	14	7	42

- Date: November 15
- Location: Kinnick Stadium, Iowa City, Iowa
- Game attendance: 67,321
- Source: Box Score and Game Story

Scoring summary
Q1	Purdue	Rod Woodson 100-yard interception return (Briggs kick)	Purdue 7–0
Q1	IOWA	Early 64-yard pass from Poholsky (Houghtlin kick)	Tied 7–7
Q1	IOWA	Bayless 31-yard pass from Poholsky (Houghtlin kick)	IOWA 14–7
Q2	IOWA	Harmon 4-yard run (Houghtlin kick)	IOWA 21–7
Q3	IOWA	Flagg 15-yard pass from Poholsky (Houghtlin kick)	IOWA 28–7
Q3	IOWA	Bayless run (Houghtlin kick)	IOWA 42–7
Q4	IOWA	Watkins 42-yard pass from Hartlieb (Houghtlin kick)	IOWA 42–7
Q4	Purdue	Schieb 18-yard pass from Downing (Briggs kick)	IOWA 42–14

=== Minnesota ===
Iowa at Minnesota

Team	1	2	3	4	Total
• Hawkeyes	0	0	13	17	30
Golden Gophers	7	10	7	3	27

- Date: November 22
- Location: Hubert H. Humphrey Metrodome, Minneapolis
- Game attendance: 65,018
- Television network: TBS
- Source: Box Score and Game Story

Scoring summary
Q1		MINN	Goetz 6-yard run (Lohmiller kick)	MINN 7–0
Q2		MINN	D. Thompson 8-yard run (Lohmiller kick)	MINN 14–0
Q2		MINN	Lohmiller 62-yard field goal	MINN 17–0
Q3		IOWA	Houghtlin 49-yard field goal	MINN 17–3
Q3		IOWA	Marciano 89-yard punt return (Houghtlin kick)	MINN 17–10
Q3		MINN	Foggie 23-yard run (Lohmiller kick)	MINN 24–10
Q3		IOWA	Houghtlin 38-yard field goal	MINN 24–13
Q4		IOWA	Flagg 1-yard pass from Vlasic (Houghtlin kick)	MINN 24–20
Q4		IOWA	Bayless 1-yard run (Houghtlin kick)	IOWA 27–24
Q4		MINN	Lohmiller 49-yard field goal	Tie 27–27
Q4	0:01	IOWA	Houghtlin 37-yard field goal	IOWA 30–27

- IOWA: Mauro 6 Rec, 100 Yds

=== Holiday Bowl ===
#19 Iowa vs. San Diego State
1986 SeaWorld Holiday Bowl

Team	1	2	3	4	Total
• Hawkeyes	7	6	8	18	39
Aztecs	6	15	7	10	38

- Date: December 30
- Location: Jack Murphy Stadium, San Diego
- Game attendance: 59,473
- Referee: Gordon Riese
- TV announcers (ESPN): Jay Randolph and Dave Logan

Scoring summary
Q1	IOWA	Bayless 5-yard run (Houghtlin kick)	IOWA 7–0
Q1	SDSU	Hardy 6-yard pass from Santos (kick failed)	IOWA 7–6
Q2	SDSU	Jackson 44-yard pass from Santos (Hardy run)	SDSU 14–7
Q2	IOWA	Vlasic 1-yard run (kick failed)	SDSU 14–13
Q2	SDSU	Gilbreath 28-yard pass from Santos (Rahill kick)	SDSU 21–13
Q3	SDSU	Gilmore 1-yard run (Rahill kick)	SDSU 28–13
Q3	IOWA	Hudson 1-yard run (Smith pass from Vlasic)	SDSU 28–21
Q4	SDSU	Hardy 6-yard run (Rahill kick)	SDSU 35–21
Q4	IOWA	Cook 29-yard pass from Vlasic (Flagg pass from Vlasic)	SDSU 35–29
Q4	IOWA	Flagg 4-yard pass from Vlasic (Houghtlin kick)	IOWA 36–35
Q4	SDSU	Rahill 21-yard field goal	SDSU 38–36
Q4	IOWA	Houghtlin 41-yard field goal	IOWA 39–38

== Roster ==
1986 Iowa Hawkeyes football team roster
Players
Coaches
Offense

Pos.	#	Name	Class
OL	55	Dave Alexander	Sr
FB	23	Richard Bass	So
RB	13	Rick Bayless	Jr
OL	78	Malcolm Christie	Jr
TE	49	Craig Clark	Jr
TE	84	Marv Cook	So
WR	82	Pat Coppinger	Jr
FB	25	Marshall Cotton	Jr
OT	61	Dave Croston	Sr
OL	63	Jeff Croston	So
OL	58	Greg Divis	Jr
WR	1	Quinn Early	Jr
TE	86	Mike Flagg	Jr
OL	74	Chris Gambol	Sr
RB	22	Grant Goodman	So
WR	80	Steve Green	Jr
WR	16	Deven Harberts	So
RB	28	Kevin Harmon	Jr
QB	8	Chuck Hartlieb	So
WR	15	Jay Hess	Sr
FB	20	David Hudson	So
G	70	Bob Kratch	So
WR	81	Derrius Loveless	Jr
WR	26	Peter Marciano	So
WR	47	Jim Mauro	Jr
QB	11	Dan McGwire	Fr
TE	89	Dave Murphy	Sr
TE	85	John Palmer	So
QB	14	Tom Poholsky	Fr
OL	67	Jim Poynton	So
RB	33	Kevin Ringer	So
FB	30	John Rudolph	Sr
OL	60	Bob Schmitt	Jr
C	56	Mark Sindlinger	Sr
WR	2	Robert Smith	Sr
OL	53	Mark Spranger	Sr
QB	12	Mark Vlasic	Sr
OL	71	Chuck Waggoner	So
TE	88	Tom Ward	Jr
WR	2	Travis Watkins	Fr
OL	73	Herb Wester	Jr

Defense

Pos.	#	Name	Class
DL	68	Tim Anderson	Jr
LB	93	Tim Batterson	Jr
DE	92	Jeff Beard	Jr
DE	48	Tyrone Berrie	So
LB	43	Jeff Blake	Jr
DB	19	Mike Bolan	Sr
DE	5	Mike Burke	Jr
DB	3	Kerry Burt	Jr
LB	37	George Davis	Sr
DL	76	Jeff Drost	Sr
DE	83	Mike Ertz	So
DE	94	Bruce Gear	Sr
DE	96	Robert Grafton	Sr
DL	64	Dave Haight	So
DL	54	Eric Higgins	So
DB	42	Tork Hook	So
DB	19	Carl Jackson	Jr
DL	77	Myron Keppy	Sr
DB	4	Lloyd Kimber	Sr
LB	34	Vernon Little	So
DE	97	Joe Mott	So
DE	71	Chris Pigott	So
DE	99	Richard Pryor	Sr
LB	32	J.J. Puk	Sr
LB	35	Brad Quast	Fr
LB	95	Jim Reilly	So
LB	38	Shawon Respress	So
DE	91	Sean Ridley	So
DB	11	Rick Schmidt	Sr
DL	72	Joe Schuster	Sr
DB	44	Keaton Smiley	Jr
DB	9	Ken Sims	Sr
DB	41	Mark Stoops	So
LB	39	Tyrone Taylor	Jr
DL	95	Eric Underberg	Sr
DL	57	Jon Vrieze	Sr
LB	46	Dan Wirth	Jr
DB	10	Anthony Wright	So

Special teams

Pos.	#	Name	Class
K	6	George Murphy	So
K	7	Rob Houghtlin	Jr
P	27	Gary Kostrubala	Sr

Head coach

- Hayden Fry

Coordinators/assistant coaches

- Bill Snyder – Offensive coordinator/quarterbacks
- Bill Brashier – Defensive coordinator
- Kirk Ferentz – Offensive line
- Carl Jackson – Running backs
- Del Miller – Offensive assistant
- Dan McCarney – Defensive line
- Barry Alvarez – Linebackers
- Don Patterson – Defensive Backs
- Bernie Wyatt – Defensive ends/recruiting coordinator
- Bill Dervich – Strength and conditioning
- Bob Stoops – Volunteer assistant
- Mike Stoops – Graduate assistant
- Jay Norvell – Graduate assistant

Legend

- (C) Team captain
- (S) Suspended
- (I) Ineligible
- Injured
- Redshirt

== Statistics ==
Team statistics. On offense, the Hawkeyes gained an average of 228.1 passing yards and 192.6 rushing yards per game. They led the Big Ten with an average of 32.6 points per game. On defense, they gave up an average of 172.9 passing yards and 102.6 rushing yards per game. They ranked third in the Big Ten in scoring defense, giving up an average of 17.8 points per game.

Passing. Quarterback duties were shared between Mark Vlasic and Tom Poholsky. Vlasic completed 93 of 152 passes (61.2%) for 1,234 yards, nine touchdowns, four interceptions, and a 143.7 passer rating. Poholsky completed 64 of 123 passes (52.0%) for 980 yards, five touchdowns, eight interceptions, and a 119.4 passer rating.

Rushing. Rick Bayless led the team with 1,040 rushing yards and nine touchdowns on 197 carries, an average of 5.3 yards per carry. Bayless' 1,040 yards ranked second in the Big Ten. He was the third player in Iowa history to rush for 1,000 yards and the fourth to lead the team in both rushing and pass receptions. His 87-yard touchdown run against Northern Illinois was the fourth longest scoring run in school history.

David Hudson ranked second with 468 rushing yards and six touchdowns on 64 carries.

Receiving. Bayless also led the team with 30 receptions for 209 yards. Jim Mauro led in receiving yardage with 580 yards on 28 carries and five receiving touchdowns.

Scoring. Kicker Rob Houghtlin led the team with 81 points scored, converting 37 of 39 extra points and 13 of 20 field goals. Rick Bayless ranked second with 66 points on 11 touchdowns.

== Awards and honors ==
Offensive tackle Dave Croston received first-team honors from the Football Writers Association of America (FWAA) and The Sporting News on the 1986 All-America college football team. He also received second team honors from the United Press International (UPI) and the Gannett News Service.

Junior running back Rick Bayless, who enrolled as a walk-on with no scholarship, received Iowa's Roy J. Carver most valuable player.

Five Iowa players received first-team honors on the 1986 All-Big Ten Conference football team: Croston (AP-1, UPI-1); Bayless (AP-1); guard Bob Kratch (UPI-1); defensive linemen Jeff Drost (AP-1, UPI-1) and Dave Haight (AP-1).Ten

== 1987 NFL draft ==
Player	Position	Round	Pick	NFL club
Chris Gambol	Tackle	3	58	Indianapolis Colts
Dave Croston	Tackle	3	61	Green Bay Packers
Mark Vlasic	Quarterback	4	88	San Diego Chargers
Jeff Drost	Defensive tackle	8	198	Green Bay Packers
