= 1986 Minnesota Golden Gophers football team =

American college football season

1986 Minnesota Golden Gophers football

Liberty Bowl, L 21–28 vs. Tennessee
- Conference: Big Ten Conference
- Record: 6–6 (5–3 Big Ten)
- Head coach: John Gutekunst (1st season)
- Captains: Mark Dusbabek; Ray Hitchcock; Norries Wilson
- Home stadium: Hubert H. Humphrey Metrodome

1986 Big Ten Conference football standings
	Conf.					Overall
Team	W		L		T	W		L		T
No. 8 Michigan +	7	–	1	–	0	11	–	2	–	0
No. 7 Ohio State +	7	–	1	–	0	10	–	3	–	0
No. 16 Iowa	5	–	3	–	0	9	–	3	–	0
Minnesota	5	–	3	–	0	6	–	6	–	0
Michigan State	4	–	4	–	0	6	–	5	–	0
Indiana	3	–	5	–	0	6	–	6	–	0
Illinois	3	–	5	–	0	4	–	7	–	0
Northwestern	2	–	6	–	0	4	–	7	–	0
Purdue	2	–	6	–	0	3	–	8	–	0
Wisconsin	2	–	6	–	0	3	–	9	–	0
+ – Conference co-champions; Rankings from AP Poll

The 1986 Minnesota Golden Gophers football team represented the University of Minnesota in the 1986 NCAA Division I-A football season. In their first full year under head coach John Gutekunst, the Golden Gophers compiled a 6–6 record and were outscored by their opponents by a combined total of 316 to 261. The team went to a second straight bowl game for the second time in school history (the first being the 1961 and 1962 Rose Bowls).

Freshman tailback Darrell Thompson was named the Big Ten's freshman of the year. Thompson and kicker Chip Lohmiller were named All-Big Ten first team. Center Ray Hitchcock, Safety Larry Joyner and offensive linemen Jim Hobbins and Troy Wolkow were named All-Big Ten second team. Offensive lineman Paul Anderson, punter Brent Herbel and offensive lineman Jim Hobbins were named Academic All-Big Ten.

Darrell Thompson was awarded the Bronko Nagurski Award and Bruce Smith Award. Linebacker Mark Dusbabek was awarded the Carl Eller Award. Chip Lohmiller was awarded the Bobby Bell Award. Offensive tackle Anthony Burke was awarded the Butch Nash Award. Offensive tackle Norries Wilson was awarded the Paul Giel Award.

Total attendance for the season was 335,150, which averaged out to 55,858 per game. The season high for attendance was against rival Iowa.

== Schedule ==
Date	Time	Opponent	Site	TV	Result	Attendance	Source
September 13	7:00 pm	Bowling Green*	Hubert H. Humphrey Metrodome; Minneapolis, MN		W 31–7	51,317	
September 20	1:30 pm	at No. 1 Oklahoma*	Oklahoma Memorial Stadium; Norman, OK		L 0–63	75,463	
September 27	7:00 pm	Pacific (CA)*	Hubert H. Humphrey Metrodome; Minneapolis, MN		L 20–24	50,270	
October 4	1:10 pm	at Purdue	Ross–Ade Stadium; West Lafayette, IN		W 36–9	63,067	
October 11	7:00 pm	Northwestern^{†}	Hubert H. Humphrey Metrodome; Minneapolis, MN		W 44–23	58,177	
October 18	11:30 am	Indiana	Hubert H. Humphrey Metrodome; Minneapolis, MN		W 19–17	52,960	
October 25	11:50 am	at Ohio State	Ohio Stadium; Columbus, OH	WTBS	L 0–33	89,936	
November 1	7:00 pm	Michigan State	Hubert H. Humphrey Metrodome; Minneapolis, MN		L 23–52	57,408	
November 8	1:05 pm	at Wisconsin	Camp Randall Stadium; Madison, WI (rivalry)		W 27–20	65,164	
November 15	12:00 pm	at No. 2 Michigan	Michigan Stadium; Ann Arbor, MI (Little Brown Jug)	PASS	W 20–17	104,864	
November 22	6:00 pm	Iowa	Hubert H. Humphrey Metrodome; Minneapolis, MN (rivalry)	WTBS	L 27–30	65,018	
December 29	7:00 pm	vs. Tennessee*	Liberty Bowl Memorial Stadium; Memphis, TN (Liberty Bowl)	Raycom	L 14–21	51,357	
*Non-conference game; ^{†}Homecoming; Rankings from AP Poll released prior to the game; All times are in Central time

== Game summaries ==
=== At Oklahoma ===
Team	1	2	3	4	Total
Golden Gophers	0	0	0	0	0
• #1 Sooners	14	21	14	14	63

- Date: September 20
- Location: Oklahoma Memorial Stadium

=== At Ohio State ===
Minnesota at Ohio State

Team	1	2	3	4	Total
Golden Gophers	0	0	0	0	0
• Buckeyes	14	3	10	6	33

- Date: October 25
- Location: Ohio Stadium

=== At Wisconsin ===
Minnesota at Wisconsin

Team	1	2	3	4	Total
• Golden Gophers	0	17	10	0	27
Badgers	0	10	10	0	20

- Date: November 8
- Location: Camp Randall Stadium, Madison, Wisconsin
- Game attendance: 65,018

Scoring summary
Q2	WIS	Gregoire 34 yard field goal	WIS 3–0
Q2	MINN	Penn 2 yard run (Lohmiller kick)	MINN 7–3
Q2	WIS	Artley 3 yard run (Gregoire kick)	WIS 10–7
Q2	MINN	Carter 27 yard pass from Foggie (Lohmiller kick)	MINN 14–10
Q2	MINN	Lohmiller 27 yard field goal	MINN 17–10
Q3	WIS	Gregoire 28 yard field goal	MINN 17–13
Q3	MINN	Penn 64 yard pass from Foggie (Lohmiller kick)	MINN 24–13
Q3	MINN	Lohmiller 43 yard field goal	MINN 27–13
Q3	WIS	Hartlieb 13 yard pass from Keyes (Gregoire kick)	MINN 27–20

- MINN: Thompson 26 Rush, 117 Yds

=== At Michigan ===
Minnesota at Michigan

Team	1	2	3	4	Total
• Golden Gophers	0	7	10	3	20
#2 Wolverines	0	10	0	7	17

- Date: November 15
- Location: Michigan Stadium, Ann Arbor, Michigan
- Game attendance: 104,864

Scoring summary
2	MINN	Anderson 15 yard pass from Foggie (Lohmiller kick)	MINN 7–0
2	MICH	Gillette 35 yard field goal	MINN 7–3
2	MICH	Witcher 8 yard run (Gillette kick)	MICH 10–7
3	MINN	Foggie 5 yard run (Lohmilller kick)	MINN 14–10
3	MINN	Lohmiller 25 yard field goal	MINN 17–10
4	MICH	White 1 yard run (Gillette kick)	Tie 17–17
4	MINN	Lohmiller 30 yard field goal	MINN 20–17

=== Iowa ===
Iowa at Minnesota

Team	1	2	3	4	Total
• Hawkeyes	0	0	13	17	30
Golden Gophers	7	10	7	3	27

- Date: November 22
- Location: Hubert H. Humphrey Metrodome, Minneapolis
- Game attendance: 65,018
- Television network: TBS

Scoring summary
Q1		MINN	Goetz 6-yard run (Lohmiller kick)	MINN 7–0
Q2		MINN	D. Thompson 8-yard run (Lohmiller kick)	MINN 14–0
Q2		MINN	Lohmiller 62-yard field goal	MINN 17–0
Q3		IOWA	Houghtlin 49-yard field goal	MINN 17–3
Q3		IOWA	Marciano 89-yard punt return (Houghtlin kick)	MINN 17–10
Q3		MINN	Foggie 23-yard run (Lohmiller kick)	MINN 24–10
Q3		IOWA	Houghtlin 38-yard field goal	MINN 24–13
Q4		IOWA	Flagg 1-yard pass from Vlasic (Houghtlin kick)	MINN 24–20
Q4		IOWA	Bayless 1-yard run (Houghtlin kick)	IOWA 27–24
Q4		MINN	Lohmiller 49-yard field goal	Tie 27–27
Q4	0:01	IOWA	Houghtlin 37-yard field goal	IOWA 30–27

=== Vs. Tennessee (Liberty Bowl) ===
Minnesota vs. Tennessee

Team	1	2	3	4	Total
Golden Gophers	0	3	8	3	14
• Volunteers	7	7	0	7	21

- Date: December 29
- Location: Liberty Bowl Memorial Stadium, Memphis, Tennessee
- Game attendance: 51,327
- TV announcers (Raycom): Merle Harmon and Kevin Kiley

== Personnel ==
1986 Minnesota Golden Gophers football team roster
Players
Coaches
Offense

Pos.	#	Name	Class
WR		Melvin Anderson
OL		Paul Anderson
TE		Ed Bahr
WR		Jason Bruce
WR		Dennis Carter
WR		Gary Couch
RB		Marcus Evans
QB		Rickey Foggie
RB		Ron Goetz
OL		Ray Hitchcock (C)
OL		Jim Hobbins	Sr
QB		Alan Holt
TE		Craig Otto
RB		Ed Penn
RB		Roselle Richardson
RB		Terry Stewart
RB		Darrell Thompson
RB		Kevin Wilson
OL		Norries Wilson (C)
OL		Troy Wolkow

Defense

Pos.	#	Name	Class
DL		Anthony Burke
LB		Mark Dusbabek (C)
DB		Duane Dutrieuille
DB		Steve Franklin
DL		Gary Hadd
LB		Bruce Holmes
LB		Larry Joyner
LB		Jon Leverenz
DB		Matt Martinez
DB		Chuck McCree
LB		Jon Melander
DL		Doug Mueller
LB		Don Pollard
DB		Donovan Small
DL		Steve Thompson
DB		David Williams

Special teams

Pos.	#	Name	Class
P		Brent Herbel
K		Chip Lohmiller

Head coach

- John Gutekunst

Coordinators/assistant coaches

Legend

- (C) Team captain
- (S) Suspended
- (I) Ineligible
- Injured
- Redshirt
