= 1986 Northwestern Wildcats football team =

American college football season

1986 Northwestern Wildcats football
- Conference: Big Ten Conference
- Record: 4–7 (2–6 Big Ten)
- Head coach: Francis Peay (1st season)
- Defensive coordinator: Bob Junko (1st season)
- Captain: Game captains
- Home stadium: Dyche Stadium

1986 Big Ten Conference football standings
	Conf.					Overall
Team	W		L		T	W		L		T
No. 8 Michigan +	7	–	1	–	0	11	–	2	–	0
No. 7 Ohio State +	7	–	1	–	0	10	–	3	–	0
No. 16 Iowa	5	–	3	–	0	9	–	3	–	0
Minnesota	5	–	3	–	0	6	–	6	–	0
Michigan State	4	–	4	–	0	6	–	5	–	0
Indiana	3	–	5	–	0	6	–	6	–	0
Illinois	3	–	5	–	0	4	–	7	–	0
Northwestern	2	–	6	–	0	4	–	7	–	0
Purdue	2	–	6	–	0	3	–	8	–	0
Wisconsin	2	–	6	–	0	3	–	9	–	0
+ – Conference co-champions; Rankings from AP Poll

The 1986 Northwestern Wildcats team represented Northwestern University during the 1986 NCAA Division I-A football season. In their first year under head coach Francis Peay, the Wildcats compiled a 4–7 record (2–6 against Big Ten Conference opponents) and finished in eighth place in the Big Ten Conference.

The team's offensive leaders were quarterback Mike Greenfield with 1,653 passing yards, Stanley Davenport with 703 rushing yards, and Curtis Duncan with 437 receiving yards. Kicker John Duvic was selected as a first-team All-Big Ten player by the Associated Press, while tight end Rich Borresen received first-team All-Big Ten honors from the UPI.

== Schedule ==
Date	Time	Opponent	Site	Result	Attendance	Source
September 6		Duke*	Dyche Stadium; Evanston, IL	L 6–17	21,514	
September 20		Army*	Dyche Stadium; Evanston, IL	W 25–18	31,123	
September 27		at Princeton*	Palmer Stadium; Princeton, NJ	W 37–0	8,750	
October 4		Indiana	Dyche Stadium; Evanston, IL	L 7–24	24,873	
October 11	7:00 p.m.	at Minnesota	Hubert H. Humphrey Metrodome; Minneapolis, MN	L 23–44	58,177	
October 18		Wisconsin	Dyche Stadium; Evanston, IL	L 27–35	34,462	
October 25		at No. 11 Iowa	Kinnick Stadium; Iowa City, IA	L 20–27	67,250	
November 1		Purdue	Dyche Stadium; Evanston, IL	L 16–17	25,417	
November 8	12:30 p.m.	at No. 11 Ohio State	Ohio Stadium; Columbus, OH	L 9–30	89,808	
November 15	1:00 p.m.	Michigan State	Dyche Stadium; Evanston, IL	W 24–21	26,711	
November 22		at Illinois	Memorial Stadium; Champaign, IL (rivalry)	W 23–18	70,568	
*Non-conference game; Rankings from AP Poll released prior to the game; All times are in Central time

== Personnel ==
1986 Northwestern Wildcats football team roster
Players
Coaches
Offense

Pos.	#	Name	Class
OL		Michael Baum
TE		Rich Borresen
QB		Greg Bradshaw
RB		Ron Burton Jr.
RB		Stanley Davenport	Jr
WR		Walter Ding
TE		Bob Driscoll
WR		Curtis Duncan
QB		Mike Greenfield	Jr
OL		Steve Hofmann
WR		George Jones
WR		Marcus Lang
WR		Randy McClellan
OL		Tom Nickles
RB		Brian Nuffer
RB		Claudell Robertson
RB		Greg Schultz
OL		Jeff Stainton
OL		John Yale

Defense

Pos.	#	Name	Class
LB		Alan Brown
LB		Bob Bucaro
DL		Bob Dirkes
DL		Dave Helding
DL		Ted Karras
LB		Tom Kaukialo
DB		Todd Krehbiel
DB		Rich Myers
DB		Kyle Palmer
LB		Charles Plant
DB		Jeff Robinson
LB		John Ruden
DL		Kelvin Scott
DB		Brett Whitley

Special teams

Pos.	#	Name	Class
P		Shawn Carpenter
K		John Duvic

Head coach

- Francis Peay

Coordinators/assistant coaches

Legend

- (C) Team captain
- (S) Suspended
- (I) Ineligible
- Injured
- Redshirt

- No position listed: Curtis Spears
