= 1986 Wisconsin Badgers football team =

American college football season

1986 Wisconsin Badgers football
- Conference: Big Ten Conference
- Record: 3–9 (2–6 Big Ten)
- Head coach: Jim Hilles (1st season)
- Offensive coordinator: Fred Jackson (1st season)
- Offensive scheme: Pro-style
- Base defense: 3–4
- MVP: Michael Reid
- Captains: Joe Armentrout; Craig Raddatz
- Home stadium: Camp Randall Stadium

1986 Big Ten Conference football standings
	Conf.					Overall
Team	W		L		T	W		L		T
No. 8 Michigan +	7	–	1	–	0	11	–	2	–	0
No. 7 Ohio State +	7	–	1	–	0	10	–	3	–	0
No. 16 Iowa	5	–	3	–	0	9	–	3	–	0
Minnesota	5	–	3	–	0	6	–	6	–	0
Michigan State	4	–	4	–	0	6	–	5	–	0
Indiana	3	–	5	–	0	6	–	6	–	0
Illinois	3	–	5	–	0	4	–	7	–	0
Northwestern	2	–	6	–	0	4	–	7	–	0
Purdue	2	–	6	–	0	3	–	8	–	0
Wisconsin	2	–	6	–	0	3	–	9	–	0
+ – Conference co-champions; Rankings from AP Poll

The 1986 Wisconsin Badgers football team represented the University of Wisconsin–Madison as a member of the Big Ten Conference during the 1986 NCAA Division I-A football season. Led by Jim Hilles in his first and only season as head coach, the Badgers compiled an overall record of 3–9 with a mark of 2–6 in conference play, placing in a three-way tie for eighth in the Big Ten. Wisconsin played home games at Camp Randall Stadium in Madison, Wisconsin.

== Schedule ==
Date	Opponent	Site	Result	Attendance	Source
September 6	at Hawaii*	Aloha Stadium; Halawa, HI	L 17–20	45,403	
September 13	Northern Illinois*	Camp Randall Stadium; Madison, WI	W 35–20	63,294	
September 20	at UNLV*	Sam Boyd Silver Bowl; Whitney, NV	L 7–17	32,207	
September 27	Wyoming*	Camp Randall Stadium; Madison, WI	L 12–21	64,954	
October 4	No. 4 Michigan	Camp Randall Stadium; Madison, WI	L 17–34	75,898	
October 11	at No. 10 Iowa	Kinnick Stadium; Iowa City, IA (rivalry)	L 6–17	67,700	
October 18	at Northwestern	Dyche Stadium; Evanston, IL	W 35–27	34,462	
October 25	Illinois^{†}	Camp Randall Stadium; Madison, WI	W 15–9	76,983	
November 1	at Indiana	Memorial Stadium; Bloomington, IN	L 7–21	35,111	
November 8	Minnesota	Camp Randall Stadium; Madison, WI (rivalry)	L 20–27	65,164	
November 15	No. 9 Ohio State	Camp Randall Stadium; Madison, WI	L 17–30	62,020	
November 22	at Michigan State	Spartan Stadium; East Lansing, MI	L 13–23	60,285	
*Non-conference game; ^{†}Homecoming; Rankings from AP Poll released prior to the game

== Personnel ==
1986 Wisconsin Badgers football team roster
Players
Coaches
Offense

Pos.	#	Name	Class
TE	88	Brian Anderson	Jr
FB	23	Joe Armentrout (C)	Sr
FB	34	Marvin Artley	So
G	64	Solomon Ashby	Jr
WR	39	Scott Bestor	Jr
WR	85	Frederick Bobo	Jr
QB	9	Paul Chryst	So
C	50	James Cisler	Sr
OT	79	Glenn Derby	Jr
RB	25	Larry Emery	Sr
OT	62	Paul Gruber	Jr
OT	78	John Hallberg	Sr
FB	30	Andy Hartlieb	So
QB	7	Mike Howard	Sr
RB	32	Leon Hunt	So
TE	14	Brant Kennedy	Jr
QB	12	Bud Keyes	Jr
C	61	Rodney Lossow	Sr
G	75	Todd Nelson	So
G	71	Keith Peterson	Jr
WR	85	James Ross	Jr
C	58	Steve Rux	Fr
G	70	David Sparger	Jr
OT	60	Rick Streifel	Sr
FB	40	Dave Tansor	Sr
WR	6	Reginald Tompkins	Sr
RB	22	Steve Vinci	So
WR	86	Bill Williams, Jr.	Fr

Defense

Pos.	#	Name	Class
NT	63	Michael Boykins	Sr
S	36	Keith Browning	Sr
LB	42	Charlie Fawley	Sr
LB	49	Victor Fortino	So
LB	99	Rick Graf	Sr
LB	81	Craig Hudson	So
DT	65	Leon Johnson	Fr
S	21	Robb Johnston	Sr
LB	95	Tim Jordan	Sr
LB	44	Dan Kissling	Fr
DT	54	Jim Kmet	Sr
LB	93	Tim Knoeck	So
S	8	Pete Nowka	So
CB	44	Nate Odomes	Sr
S	19	Paul Partington	So
LB	53	Craig Raddatz (C)	Sr
LB	52	Michael Reid	Sr
CB	16	Eric Sydnor	Sr
CB	44	Bobby Taylor	Sr
DT	59	Dick Teets	Sr
NT	60	Chad Vande Zande	So
CB	15	Philip Watters	Sr
LB	48	David Wings	So

Special teams

Pos.	#	Name	Class
P	18	Scott Cepicky	Jr
K	5	Todd Gregoire	Jr

Head coach

- Jim Hilles

Coordinators/assistant coaches

- Fred Jackson – Lead Coach-Offense/Quarterbacks/Receivers
- Dave Anderson – Lead Coach-Defense/Outside Linebackers
- Steve Carson – Defensive Backs
- Bill Dudley – Running Backs
- Kurt Humes – Inside Linebackers
- Arnold Jeter – Defensive Line
- John O'Grady – Offensive Line/Centers
- Scott Seeliger – Offensive Line/Tight Ends
- Jerry Fishbain – Recruiting Coordinator/Special Teams

Legend

- (C) Team captain
- (S) Suspended
- (I) Ineligible
- Injured
- Redshirt

== Draft picks ==
Player	Position	Round	Pick	NFL club
Nate Odomes	Cornerback	2	29	Buffalo Bills
Rick Graf	Linebacker	2	43	Miami Dolphins
Tim Jordan	Linebacker	4	107	New England Patriots
Michael Reid	Linebacker	7	181	Atlanta Falcons
Joe Armentrout	Running Back	9	224	Tampa Bay Buccaneers
Craig Raddatz	Linebacker	9	242	Cincinnati Bengals
Bobby Taylor	Defensive Back	10	266	Miami Dolphins
Larry Emery	Running Back	12	320	Atlanta Falcons
