= 1986 Indiana Hoosiers football team =

American college football season

1986 Indiana Hoosiers football

All-American Bowl, L 13–27 vs. Florida State
- Conference: Big Ten Conference
- Record: 6–6 (3–5 Big Ten)
- Head coach: Bill Mallory (3rd season)
- Defensive coordinator: Joe Novak (3rd season)
- MVP: Van Waiters
- Captains: Leonard Bell; Vince Fisher; Dave Lilja; Bob Riley
- Home stadium: Memorial Stadium

1986 Big Ten Conference football standings
	Conf.					Overall
Team	W		L		T	W		L		T
No. 8 Michigan +	7	–	1	–	0	11	–	2	–	0
No. 7 Ohio State +	7	–	1	–	0	10	–	3	–	0
No. 16 Iowa	5	–	3	–	0	9	–	3	–	0
Minnesota	5	–	3	–	0	6	–	6	–	0
Michigan State	4	–	4	–	0	6	–	5	–	0
Indiana	3	–	5	–	0	6	–	6	–	0
Illinois	3	–	5	–	0	4	–	7	–	0
Northwestern	2	–	6	–	0	4	–	7	–	0
Purdue	2	–	6	–	0	3	–	8	–	0
Wisconsin	2	–	6	–	0	3	–	9	–	0
+ – Conference co-champions; Rankings from AP Poll

The 1986 Indiana Hoosiers football team represented Indiana University Bloomington as a member of the Big Ten Conference during the 1986 NCAA Division I-A football season. Led by third-year head coach Bill Mallory, the Hoosiers compiled an overall record of 6–6 with a mark of 3–5 in conference play, tying for sixth place in the Big Ten. Indiana was invited to the All-American Bowl, where they lost to Florida State. The team played home games at Memorial Stadium in Bloomington, Indiana.

== Schedule ==
Date	Time	Opponent	Site	TV	Result	Attendance	Source
September 13		Louisville*	Memorial Stadium; Bloomington, IN		W 21–0	35,126	
September 20		Navy*	Memorial Stadium; Bloomington, IN		W 52–29	32,434	
September 27		at Missouri*	Faurot Field; Columbia, MO		W 41–24	40,606	
October 4		at Northwestern	Dyche Stadium; Evanston, IL		W 24–7	24,873	
October 11	1:00 p.m.	Ohio State^{†}	Memorial Stadium; Bloomington, IN		L 22–24	51,641	
October 18	1:05 p.m.	at Minnesota	Hubert H. Humphrey Metrodome; Minneapolis, MN		L 17–19	52,960	
October 25	12:30 p.m.	No. 4 Michigan	Memorial Stadium; Bloomington, IN		L 14–38	36,964	
November 1	12:30 p.m.	Wisconsin	Memorial Stadium; Bloomington, IN		W 21–7	35,111	
November 8	12:00 p.m.	at Michigan State	Spartan Stadium; East Lansing, MI (rivalry)		W 17–14	64,973	
November 15		Illinois	Memorial Stadium; Bloomington, IN (rivalry)		L 16–21	34,572	
November 22	1:00 p.m.	at Purdue	Ross–Ade Stadium; West Lafayette, IN (Old Oaken Bucket)		L 15–17	69,784	
December 31	3:00 p.m.	vs. Florida State	Legion Field; Birmingham, AL (All-American Bowl)	TBS	L 13–27	30,000	
*Non-conference game; ^{†}Homecoming; Rankings from AP Poll released prior to the game

== Game summaries ==
=== Ohio State ===
Ohio State at Indiana

Team	1	2	3	4	Total
• Buckeyes	7	7	10	0	24
Hoosiers	7	7	0	8	22

- Date: October 11
- Location: Memorial Stadium

=== Michigan ===
#4 Michigan at Indiana

Team	1	2	3	4	Total
• Wolverines	14	21	3	0	38
Hoosiers	0	0	0	14	14

- Date: October 25
- Location: Memorial Stadium, Bloomington, IN
- Game attendance: 36,964

=== Vs. Florida State (All-American Bowl) ===
Indiana vs. Florida State

Team	1	2	3	4	Total
Hoosiers	3	0	7	3	13
• Seminoles	6	7	7	7	27

- Date: December 31
- Location: Legion Field

== Personnel ==
1986 Indiana Hoosiers football team roster
Players
Coaches
Offense

Pos.	#	Name	Class
WR		Kenny Allen
RB		Dan Boggan
RB		Gene Boyd
WR		Tony Buford
WR		Stacy Dawsey
OL		Joe Dedic
QB		Brian Dewitz
OL		Brian Finney
WR		Ernie Jones
TE		Tim Jordan
OL		Dave Kinniry
QB		Dave Kramme
TE		Dave Lilja
TE		Carlos Marte
OL		Eric Moore
RB		Tom Polce
RB		Andre Powell
OL		Tim Radtke
OL		Bob Riley
QB		Dave Schnell
OL		Don Shrader
RB		Damon Sweazy
RB		Anthony Thompson
RB		Spud Washington
RB		Barry Way

Defense

Pos.	#	Name	Class
LB		Willie Bates
DL		Dan Bauer
DB		Leonard Bell
DB		Erick Coleman
DB		Alex Green
DL		Walt Harris
DB		Eric Hickerson
LB		Joe Huff
DL		Larry Luther
LB		Brad Mitchell
DL		Doug Schlereth
LB		Van Walters

Special teams

Pos.	#	Name	Class
K		Pete Stoyanovich
P		Dan Stryzinski
K		Jay Tuttle

Head coach

- Bill Mallory

Coordinators/assistant coaches

Legend

- (C) Team captain
- (S) Suspended
- (I) Ineligible
- Injured
- Redshirt

== 1987 NFL draftees ==
Player	Round	Pick	Position	NFL Club
Leonard Bell	3	76	Defensive back	Cincinnati Bengals
