= Dave Croston =

American football player (born 1963)

No. 60
- Position: Offensive tackle

Personal information
- Born: November 10, 1963 (age 62); Sioux City, Iowa, U.S.
- Listed height: 6 ft 5 in (1.96 m)
- Listed weight: 280 lb (127 kg)

Career information
- High school: East (Sioux City)
- College: Iowa
- NFL draft: 1987: 3rd round, 61st overall pick

Career history
- Green Bay Packers (1987–1989)

Awards and highlights
- First-team All-American (1986); Big Ten Offensive Lineman of the Year (1986); First-team All-Big Ten (1986)

Career NFL statistics
- Games played: 16
- Games started: 1
- Stats at Pro Football Reference

David Charles Croston (born November 10, 1963) is an American former professional football player who was an offensive tackle in the National Football League (NFL). He played college football for the Iowa Hawkeyes, earning All-American honors.

== Early life ==
Croston was born David Charles Croston on November 10, 1963, in Sioux City, Iowa.

== Career ==
Pre-draft measurables
| Height | Weight | Arm length | Hand span | 40-yard dash | 10-yard split | 20-yard split | 20-yard shuttle | Vertical jump | Broad jump | Bench press |
|---|---|---|---|---|---|---|---|---|---|---|
| 6 ft 4 3/4 in (1.95 m) | 281 lb (127 kg) | 33 3/4 in (0.86 m) | 10 1/2 in (0.27 m) | 5.48 s | 1.84 s | 3.11 s | 4.76 s | 24.5 in (0.62 m) | 7 ft 8 in (2.34 m) | 14 reps |
All values from NFL Combine

Croston was the selected in the third round (61st overall) of the 1987 NFL draft by the Green Bay Packers. He had a one-year career playing 16 games for the Packers in 1988. Croston played at the collegiate level at the University of Iowa.
