= 1986 Purdue Boilermakers football team =

American college football season

1986 Purdue Boilermakers football
- Conference: Big Ten Conference
- Record: 3–8 (2–6 Big Ten)
- Head coach: Leon Burtnett (5th season)
- Offensive coordinator: Bob Spoo (2nd season)
- Defensive coordinator: Joe Tiller (4th season)
- MVP: Rod Woodson
- Captains: Rick Brunner; Kevin Holley; Rod Woodson
- Home stadium: Ross–Ade Stadium

1986 Big Ten Conference football standings
	Conf.					Overall
Team	W		L		T	W		L		T
No. 8 Michigan +	7	–	1	–	0	11	–	2	–	0
No. 7 Ohio State +	7	–	1	–	0	10	–	3	–	0
No. 16 Iowa	5	–	3	–	0	9	–	3	–	0
Minnesota	5	–	3	–	0	6	–	6	–	0
Michigan State	4	–	4	–	0	6	–	5	–	0
Indiana	3	–	5	–	0	6	–	6	–	0
Illinois	3	–	5	–	0	4	–	7	–	0
Northwestern	2	–	6	–	0	4	–	7	–	0
Purdue	2	–	6	–	0	3	–	8	–	0
Wisconsin	2	–	6	–	0	3	–	9	–	0
+ – Conference co-champions; Rankings from AP Poll

The 1986 Purdue Boilermakers football team represented Purdue University as a member of the Big Ten Conference during the 1986 NCAA Division I-A football season. Led by Leon Burtnett in his fifth and final season as head coach, the Boilermakers compiled an overall record of 3–8 with a mark of 2–6 in conference play, placing in a three-way tie for eighth in the Big Ten. Purdue played home games at Ross–Ade Stadium in West Lafayette, Indiana.

== Schedule ==
Date	Opponent	Site	Result	Attendance	Source
September 13	Ball State*	Ross–Ade Stadium; West Lafayette, IN	W 20–3	60,161	
September 20	Pittsburgh*	Ross–Ade Stadium; West Lafayette, IN	L 26–41	55,621	
September 27	at Notre Dame*	Notre Dame Stadium; Notre Dame, IN (rivalry)	L 9–41	59,075	
October 4	Minnesota^{†}	Ross–Ade Stadium; West Lafayette, IN	L 9–36	63,067	
October 11	at Illinois	Memorial Stadium; Champaign, IL (rivalry)	L 27–34	73,720	
October 18	Ohio State	Ross–Ade Stadium; West Lafayette, IN	L 11–39	68,737	
October 25	at Michigan State	Spartan Stadium; East Lansing, MI	L 3–37	77,063	
November 1	at Northwestern	Dyche Stadium; Evanston, IL	W 17–16	25,417	
November 8	No. 3 Michigan	Ross–Ade Stadium; West Lafayette, IN	L 7–31	61,323	
November 15	at Iowa	Kinnick Stadium; Iowa City, IA	L 14–42	67,321	
November 22	Indiana	Ross–Ade Stadium; West Lafayette, IN (Old Oaken Bucket)	W 17–15	69,784	
*Non-conference game; ^{†}Homecoming; Rankings from AP Poll released prior to the game

== Game summaries ==
=== At Notre Dame ===
Purdue at Notre Dame

Team	1	2	3	4	Total
Boilermakers	0	0	6	3	9
• Fighting Irish	10	14	3	14	41

- Date: Saturday, September 27
- Location: Notre Dame Stadium, South Bend, Indiana
- Game attendance: 59,075

Scoring summary
1	Notre Dame	Taylor 2-yard run (Carney kick)	Notre Dame 7-0
1	Notre Dame	Carney 42-yard field goal	Notre Dame 10-0
2	Notre Dame	Johnson 2-yard run (Carney kick)	Notre Dame 17-0
2	Notre Dame	Jackson 35-yard pass from Beuerlein (Carney kick)	Notre Dame 24-0
3	Notre Dame	Carney 49-yard field goal	Notre Dame 27-0
3	Purdue	Chaney 3-yard run (pass failed)	Notre Dame 27-6
4	Purdue	Briggs 22-yard field goal	Notre Dame 27-9
4	Notre Dame	Johnson 13-yard run (Carney kick)	Notre Dame 34-9
4	Notre Dame	Green 27-yard run (Carney kick )	Notre Dame 41-9

=== Ohio State ===
Ohio State Buckeyes (4–2) at Purdue Boilermakers (1–5)

Quarter	1	2	3	4	Total
Ohio St	6	9	17	7	39
Purdue	0	3	0	8	11

at Ross-Ade Stadium, West Lafayette, Indiana

- Date: October 18
- Game time: 6:15 p.m.
- Game weather: Clear, 53 °F (12 °C)
- Game attendance: 68,737
- Referee: Otho Kortz
- Box Score

Game information

First quarter

- OSU – Matt Frantz 21-yard field goal, 8:04. Ohio St 7–0. Drive: 14 plays, 69 yards.
- OSU – Matt Frantz 22-yard field goal, 1:55. Ohio St 6–0. Drive: 11 plays, 32 yards.

Second quarter

- OSU – Cris Carter 3-yard pass from Jim Karsatos (pass failed), 10:36. Ohio St 12–0. Drive: 12 plays, 92 yards.
- OSU – Matt Frantz 22-yard field goal, 1:05. Ohio St 15–0. Drive: 11 plays, 50 yards.
- PUR – Jonathan Briggs 23-yard field goal, 0:02. Ohio St 15–3. Drive: 8 plays, 61 yards.

Third quarter

- OSU – Nate Harris 37-yard pass from Jim Karsatos (Matt Frantz kick), 13:00. Ohio St 22–3. Drive: 3 plays, 65 yards.
- OSU – Dave Brown 100-yard interception return (Matt Frantz kick), 9:11. Ohio St 29–3.
- OSU – Matt Frantz 21-yard field goal, 1:03. Ohio St 32–3. Drive: 8 plays, 56 yards.

Fourth quarter

- PUR – Caleb Bonds 3-yard pass from Doug Downing (run good), 11:59. Ohio St 32–11. Drive: 12 plays, 77 yards.
- OSU – Jamie Holland 23-yard pass from Tom Tupa (Matt Frantz kick), 10:11. Ohio St 39–11. Drive: 5 plays, 73 yards.

Top passers

- OSU – Jim Karsatos – 11/17, 190 yards, 2 TD
- PUR – Doug Downing – 23/48, 289 yards, TD, 2 INT

Top rushers

- OSU – James Bryant – 24 rushes, 129 yards
- PUR – James Medlock – 9 rushes, 33 yards

Top receivers

- OSU – Cris Carter – 7 receptions, 118 yards, TD
- PUR – Rick Brunner – 5 receptions, 93 yards

=== At Northwestern ===
Purdue at Northwestern

Team	1	2	3	4	Total
• Boilermakers	7	0	7	3	17
Wildcats	3	10	0	3	16

- Date: November 1
- Location: Dyche Stadium • Evanston, Illinois

Scoring summary
1		NW	Duvic 27 yard field goal	Northwestern 3-0
1		PUR	McCline 2 yard run (Briggs kick)	Purdue 7-3
2		NW	Greenfield 1 yard run (Duvic kick)	Northwestern 10-7
2		NW	Duvic 40 yard field goal	Northwestern 13-7
3		PUR	C. Williams 69 yard pass from Downing (Briggs kick)	Purdue 14-13
4		NW	Duvic 52 yard field goal	Northwestern 16-14
4	:04	PUR	Briggs 25 yard field goal	Purdue 17-16

=== Michigan ===
#3 Michigan at Purdue

Team	1	2	3	4	Total
• Wolverines	7	17	7	0	31
Boilermakers	0	0	0	7	7

- Date: November 9
- Location: Ross–Ade Stadium, West Lafayette, IN
- Game attendance: 61,323

=== At Iowa ===
Purdue at Iowa

Team	1	2	3	4	Total
Boilermakers	7	0	0	7	14
• Hawkeyes	14	7	14	7	42

- Date: November 15
- Location: Kinnick Stadium, Iowa City, Iowa
- Game attendance: 67,321

Scoring summary
Q1	Purdue	Rod Woodson 100-yard interception return (Briggs kick)	Purdue 7–0
Q1	IOWA	Early 64-yard pass from Poholsky (Houghtlin kick)	Tied 7–7
Q1	IOWA	Bayless 31-yard pass from Poholsky (Houghtlin kick)	IOWA 14–7
Q2	IOWA	Harmon 4-yard run (Houghtlin kick)	IOWA 21–7
Q3	IOWA	Flagg 15-yard pass from Poholsky (Houghtlin kick)	IOWA 28–7
Q3	IOWA	Bayless run (Houghtlin kick)	IOWA 42–7
Q4	IOWA	Watkins 42-yard pass from Hartlieb (Houghtlin kick)	IOWA 42–7
Q4	Purdue	Schieb 18-yard pass from Downing (Briggs kick)	IOWA 42–14

=== Indiana ===
Indiana Hoosiers (6–4) at Purdue Boilermakers (2–8)

Quarter	1	2	3	4	Total
Indiana	0	0	7	8	15
Purdue	10	0	0	7	17

at Ross–Ade Stadium, West Lafayette, Indiana

- Date: November 22
- Game time: 1:00 p.m.
- Game attendance: 69,748

Game information

First quarter

- PUR – James Medlock 1-yard run (Jonathan Briggs kick). Purdue 7–0.
- PUR – Jonathan Briggs 43-yard field goal. Purdue 10–0.

Second quarter

- No scoring

Third quarter

- IND – Anthony Thompson 2-yard run (Pete Stoyanovich kick). Purdue 10–7.

Fourth quarter

- PUR – Calvin Williams 4-yard run (Jonathan Briggs kick). Purdue 17–7.
- IND – Stacy Dawsey 45-yard pass from Dave Kramme (pass good). Purdue 17–15.

Top passers

- IND – Dave Kramme – 12/24, 213 yards, TD, INT
- PUR – Jeff George – 8/20, 139 yards

Top rushers

- IND – Anthony Thompson – 31 rushes, 131 yards, TD
- PUR – Rod Woodson – 15 rushes, 93 yards

Top receivers

- IND – Tony Buford – 4 receptions, 58 yards
- PUR – Rod Woodson – 3 receptions, 67 yards

Purdue wore gold jerseys. In his final collegiate game, Rod Woodson gained over 150 combined rushing and receiving yards, in addition to making ten tackles and forcing a fumble, leading Purdue to a victory over arch-rival Indiana. This 50th victory in the series kept Indiana from receiving a bowl berth and denied Anthony Thompson the Heisman Trophy.

== Personnel ==
1986 Purdue Boilermakers football team roster
Players
Coaches
Offense

Pos.	#	Name	Class
TE		Jack Beery
RB		Caleb Bonds
OL		Keith Brown
WR		Rick Brunner
RB		Jerry Chaney
OL		Mike Connors
OL		Bruce Crites
QB		Doug Downing
WR		Ted Gelov
QB		Jeff George
RB		Tony Grant
WR		Jon Hayes
QB		Jeff Huber
QB		Shawn McCarthy
RB		Lorenzo McCline
RB		James Medlock
RB		Scott Nelson
TE		Dwayne O'Connor
OL		DeWayne Penn
OL		Jim Richmond
WR		Lance Scheib
TE		Brad Schumacher
OL		Todd Tyrie
WR		Calvin Williams

Defense

Pos.	#	Name	Class
DB		Ronnie Beeks
DB	19	Cris Dishman	Jr
DB		Marc Foster
DL		Bill Gildea
DL		Bill Hitchcock
DL		Kevin Holley
DB		Scott Kalinoski
DL		Chris Keevers
LB	48	Fred Strickland	Jr
LB	44	Kevin Sumlin	Sr
DL		Tony Visco
DB		Mike Weaver
DB	26	Rod Woodson	Sr

Special teams

Pos.	#	Name	Class
K		Jonathan Briggs

Head coach

- Leon Burtnett

Coordinators/assistant coaches

- Bob Spoo
- Bill Doba
- Joe Tiller
- Tim Brewster (GA)

Legend

- (C) Team captain
- (S) Suspended
- (I) Ineligible
- Injured
- Redshirt

== 1987 NFL draft ==
Player	Position	Round	Pick	NFL club
Rod Woodson	Cornerback	1	10	Pittsburgh Steelers
