= 1986 Ohio State Buckeyes football team =

American college football season

1986 Ohio State Buckeyes football

Big Ten co-champion Cotton Bowl Classic champion

Cotton Bowl Classic, W 28–12 vs. Texas A&M
- Conference: Big Ten Conference

Ranking
- Coaches: No. 6
- AP: No. 7
- Record: 10–3 (7–1 Big Ten)
- Head coach: Earle Bruce (8th season)
- Defensive coordinator: Gary Blackney (2nd season)
- MVP: Cris Carter
- Captains: Sonny Gordon; Jim Karsatos
- Home stadium: Ohio Stadium

1986 Big Ten Conference football standings
	Conf.					Overall
Team	W		L		T	W		L		T
No. 8 Michigan +	7	–	1	–	0	11	–	2	–	0
No. 7 Ohio State +	7	–	1	–	0	10	–	3	–	0
No. 16 Iowa	5	–	3	–	0	9	–	3	–	0
Minnesota	5	–	3	–	0	6	–	6	–	0
Michigan State	4	–	4	–	0	6	–	5	–	0
Indiana	3	–	5	–	0	6	–	6	–	0
Illinois	3	–	5	–	0	4	–	7	–	0
Northwestern	2	–	6	–	0	4	–	7	–	0
Purdue	2	–	6	–	0	3	–	8	–	0
Wisconsin	2	–	6	–	0	3	–	9	–	0
+ – Conference co-champions; Rankings from AP Poll

The 1986 Ohio State Buckeyes football team was an American football team that represented the Ohio State University as a member of the Big Ten Conference during the 1986 NCAA Division I-A football season. In their eighth year under head coach Earle Bruce, the Buckeyes compiled a 10–3 record (7–1 in conference games), tied with Michigan for the Big Ten championship, and outscored opponents by a total of 319 to 167. They opened the season with back-to-back losses (Alabama and Washington) for the first time since 1891. They then won nine consecutive games before losing to No. 6 Michigan. They concluded the season with a 28–12 victory over No. 8 Texas A&M in the 1987 Cotton Bowl Classic. The Buckeyes were ranked No. 7 in the final AP poll.

The Buckeyes gained an average of 182.2 rushing yards and 177.8 passing yards per game. On defense, they held opponents to 136.3 rushing yards and 165.5 passing yards per game. The team's statistical leaders included quarterback Jim Karsatos (1,927 passing yards, 53.8% completion percentage), running back Vince Workman (985 rushing yards, 5.0 yards per carry), and wide receiver Cris Carter (65 receptions for 1,066 yards). Carter and linebacker Chris Spielman were consensus first-team All-Americans. Seven Ohio State players received first-team honors on the 1986 All-Big Ten Conference football team: Carter (AP/UPI); Spielman (AP/UPI); center Bob Maggs (AP/UPI); defensive end Eric Kumerow (AP/UPI); guard Jeff Uhlenhake (AP); tight end Ed Taggert (AP); and defensive back Sonny Gordon (AP).

The team played its home games at Ohio Stadium in Columbus, Ohio.

== Schedule ==
Date	Time	Opponent	Rank	Site	TV	Result	Attendance	Source
August 27	8:00 p.m.	vs. No. 5 Alabama*	No. 9	Giants Stadium; East Rutherford, NJ (Kickoff Classic)	Raycom	L 10–16	68,296	
September 13	2:30 p.m.	at No. 17 Washington*	No. 10	Husky Stadium; Seattle, WA	CBS	L 7–40	61,071	
September 20	1:30 p.m.	Colorado*		Ohio Stadium; Columbus, OH		W 13–10	88,404	
September 27	1:30 p.m.	Utah*		Ohio Stadium; Columbus, OH		W 64–6	89,645	
October 4	1:30 p.m.	Illinois		Ohio Stadium; Columbus, OH (Illibuck)		W 14–0	90,030	
October 11	1:00 p.m.	at Indiana		Memorial Stadium; Bloomington, IN		W 24–22	51,641	
October 18	7:00 p.m.	at Purdue		Ross–Ade Stadium; West Lafayette, IN	WTBS	W 39–11	68,737	
October 25	12:30 p.m.	Minnesota^{†}		Ohio Stadium; Columbus, OH	WTBS	W 33–0	89,936	
November 1	12:30 p.m.	at No. 11 Iowa	No. 17	Kinnick Stadium; Iowa City, IA	WTBS	W 31–10	67,640	
November 8	1:30 p.m.	Northwestern	No. 11	Ohio Stadium; Columbus, OH		W 30–9	89,808	
November 15	12:00 p.m.	at Wisconsin	No. 9	Camp Randall Stadium; Madison, WI	CBS	W 30–17	62,020	
November 22	12:00 p.m.	No. 6 Michigan	No. 7	Ohio Stadium; Columbus, OH (rivalry)	CBS	L 24–26	90,674	
January 1, 1987	1:30 p.m.	vs. No. 8 Texas A&M*	No. 11	Cotton Bowl; Dallas, TX (Cotton Bowl Classic)	CBS	W 28–12	74,188	
*Non-conference game; ^{†}Homecoming; Rankings from AP Poll released prior to the game; All times are in Eastern time

== Game summaries ==
=== Vs. Alabama ===
Team	1	2	3	4	Total
• Alabama	3	3	0	10	16
Ohio St	0	7	3	0	10

- Date: August 27
- Location: Giants Stadium

=== At Washington ===
Team	1	2	3	4	Total
Ohio St	0	0	7	0	7
• Washington	0	24	9	7	40

- Date: September 13
- Location: Husky Stadium

=== Colorado ===
Team	1	2	3	4	Total
Colorado	0	0	3	7	10
• Ohio St	3	7	0	3	13

- Date: September 20
- Location: Ohio Stadium

=== Utah ===
Team	1	2	3	4	Total
Utah	0	3	3	0	6
• Ohio St	21	10	20	13	64

- Date: September 27
- Location: Ohio Stadium

=== Illinois ===
Team	1	2	3	4	Total
Illinois	0	0	0	0	0
• Ohio St	0	14	0	0	14

- Date: October 4
- Location: Ohio Stadium

=== At Indiana ===
Team	1	2	3	4	Total
• Ohio St	7	7	10	0	24
Indiana	7	7	0	8	22

- Date: October 11
- Location: Memorial Stadium

=== At Purdue ===
Ohio State Buckeyes (4–2) at Purdue Boilermakers (1–5)

Quarter	1	2	3	4	Total
Ohio St	6	9	17	7	39
Purdue	0	3	0	8	11

at Ross-Ade Stadium, West Lafayette, Indiana

- Date: October 18
- Game time: 6:15 p.m.
- Game weather: Clear, 53 °F (12 °C)
- Game attendance: 68,737
- Referee: Otho Kortz

Game information

First quarter

- OSU – Matt Frantz 21-yard field goal, 8:04. Ohio St 7–0. Drive: 14 plays, 69 yards.
- OSU – Matt Frantz 22-yard field goal, 1:55. Ohio St 6–0. Drive: 11 plays, 32 yards.

Second quarter

- OSU – Cris Carter 3-yard pass from Jim Karsatos (pass failed), 10:36. Ohio St 12–0. Drive: 12 plays, 92 yards.
- OSU – Matt Frantz 22-yard field goal, 1:05. Ohio St 15–0. Drive: 11 plays, 50 yards.
- PUR – Jonathan Briggs 23-yard field goal, 0:02. Ohio St 15–3. Drive: 8 plays, 61 yards.

Third quarter

- OSU – Nate Harris 37-yard pass from Jim Karsatos (Matt Frantz kick), 13:00. Ohio St 22–3. Drive: 3 plays, 65 yards.
- OSU – Dave Brown 100-yard interception return (Matt Frantz kick), 9:11. Ohio St 29–3.
- OSU – Matt Frantz 21-yard field goal, 1:03. Ohio St 32–3. Drive: 8 plays, 56 yards.

Fourth quarter

- PUR – Caleb Bonds 3-yard pass from Doug Downing (run good), 11:59. Ohio St 32–11. Drive: 12 plays, 77 yards.
- OSU – Jamie Holland 23-yard pass from Tom Tupa (Matt Frantz kick), 10:11. Ohio St 39–11. Drive: 5 plays, 73 yards.

Top passers

- OSU – Jim Karsatos – 11/17, 190 yards, 2 TD
- PUR – Doug Downing – 23/48, 289 yards, TD, 2 INT

Top rushers

- OSU – James Bryant – 24 rushes, 129 yards
- PUR – James Medlock – 9 rushes, 33 yards

Top receivers

- OSU – Cris Carter – 7 receptions, 118 yards, TD
- PUR – Rick Brunner – 5 receptions, 93 yards

Dave Brown's interception return set a Big Ten record for longest in a single game.

=== Minnesota ===
Team	1	2	3	4	Total
Minnesota	0	0	0	0	0
• Ohio St	14	3	10	6	33

- Date: October 25
- Location: Ohio Stadium

=== Iowa ===
Team	1	2	3	4	Total
• Ohio St	0	21	7	3	31
Iowa	7	0	3	0	10

- Date: November 1
- Location: Kinnick Stadium

=== Northwestern ===
Team	1	2	3	4	Total
Northwestern	0	3	3	3	9
• Ohio St	10	7	3	10	30

- Date: November 8
- Location: Ohio Stadium

=== Wisconsin ===
Team	1	2	3	4	Total
• Ohio St	17	10	0	3	30
Wisconsin	0	10	7	0	17

- Date: November 15
- Location: Camp Randall Stadium

=== Michigan ===
#6 Michigan Wolverines (9–1) at #7 Ohio State Buckeyes (9–2)

Quarter	1	2	3	4	Total
Michigan	3	3	13	7	26
Ohio St	14	0	3	7	24

at Ohio Stadium, Columbus, Ohio

- Date: November 22
- Game time: 12:00 p.m. CDT
- Game weather: Sunny, 55 °F (13 °C)
- Game attendance: 90,674
- Referee: Tom Quinn
- TV: ABC

Game information

First quarter

- OSU – Cris Carter 4-yard pass from Jim Karsatos (Matt Frantz kick), 10:47. Ohio St 7–0. Drive: 10 plays, 45 yards, 4:06.
- MICH – Mike Gillette 32-yard field goal, 4:18. Ohio St 7–3. Drive: 13 plays, 45 yards, 6:20.
- OSU – Vince Workman 46-yard run (Matt Frantz kick), 3:03. Ohio St 14–3. Drive: 3 plays, 80 yards, 1:14.

Second quarter

- MICH – Mike Gillette 34-yard field goal, 6:47. Ohio St 14–6. Drive: 8 plays, 63 yards, 3:19.

Third quarter

- MICH – Jamie Morris 4-yard run (Mike Gillette kick), 8:53. Ohio St 14–13. Drive: 14 plays, 83 yards, 6:02.
- OSU – Matt Frantz 27-yard field goal, 5:26. Ohio St 17–13. Drive: 9 plays, 65 yards, 3:22.
- MICH – Jamie Morris 8-yard run (pass failed), 3:53. Michigan 19–17. Drive: 4 plays, 76 yards, 1:27.

Fourth quarter

- MICH – Thomas Wilcher 7-yard run (Mike Gillette kick), 12:40. Michigan 26–17. Drive: 8 plays, 85 yards, 4:19.
- OSU – Cris Carter 17-yard pass from Jim Karsatos (Matt Frantz kick), 9:42. Michigan 26–24. Drive: 4 plays, 56 yards, 1:18.

Top passers

- MICH – Jim Harbaugh – 19/29, 261 yards, 2 INT
- OSU – Jim Karsatos – 15/27, 188 yards, 2 TD, INT

Top rushers

- MICH – Jamie Morris – 29 rushes, 210 yards, 2 TD
- OSU – Vince Workman – 21 rushes, 126 yards, TD

Top receivers

- MICH – Jeffrey Brown – 5 receptions, 54 yards
- OSU – Cris Carter – 7 receptions, 75 yards, 2 TD

Matt Frantz missed a 45-yard field goal that would have given Ohio State the lead with 1:01 remaining in the game. Chris Spielman had 29 tackles in defeat.

=== Vs. Texas A&M (Cotton Bowl) ===
Team	1	2	3	4	Total
• Ohio St	0	7	14	7	28
Texas A&M	3	3	0	6	12

- Date: January 1
- Location: Cotton Bowl

== Personnel ==
=== Roster ===
1986 Ohio State Buckeyes football team roster
Players
Coaches
Offense

Pos.	#	Name	Class
RB	28	Roman Bates	Sr
FB	38	Chris Boddie	Fr
QB, P	9	Tom Bolyard	Fr
RB	41	Jaymes Bryant	Fr
SE	2	Cris Carter	Jr
QB	24	Mike Chancey	Fr
SE	18	Gary Clift	So
G	66	Karl Coles	Fr
FB	44	George Cooper	Jr
SE	22	Anthony Cupe	Fr
OT	50	Jeff Davidson	Fr
FL	4	Dino Dawson	Jr
OT	78	Mike Durham	So
G	70	Steve France	Fr
QB	15	Greg Frey	Fr
FB	33	Steve Gresock	Jr
OT	65	Erik Grimm	Fr
C	76	John Grubb	Jr
FL	20	Tim Haller	Sr
SE	26	Nate Harris	Jr
C	60	Dan Hirneise	Fr
TE	83	Frank Hoak	So
FL	6	Jamie Holland	Sr
TE	87	Rich Huffman	Fr
RB	37	Hayden Humphrey	Jr
TE	81	John Hutchison	Sr
QB	16	Jim Karsatos (C)	Sr
OT	72	Larry Kotterman	Jr
G	73	Jeff Kuczek	Fr
G	64	Mike Kuri	Fr
TE	86	Gary Lickovitch	Fr
C	71	Bob Maggs	Sr
FB	11	Bill Matlock	So
C	52	Tom Moore	So
TE	90	Don Morris	So
C	53	Rich Morris	Jr
OT	74	Tim Moxley	Fr
TE	85	James Palmer	Fr
OT	75	John Peterson	Fr
QB	13	Scott Powell	So
RB	1	Lance Price	Fr
FL	5	Everett Ross	So
OL	79	Joe Staysniak	Fr
TE	80	Ed Taggert	Sr
G	68	Jeff Uhlenhake	So
G	61	Ken Voll	Fr
RB	43	Barry Walker	Sr
RB	25	John Wooldridge	Sr
RB	42	Vince Workman	So
G	51	Greg Zackeroff	So

Defense

Pos.	#	Name	Class
OLB	32	Tom Anderzack	So
DT	76	Dan Beatty	Fr
ROV	3	Sean Bell	So
LB	91	Brian Benio	Fr
S	27	David Brown	Fr
DT	94	Henry Brown	Jr
CB	6	Joe Canestraro	Jr
OLB	59	Matthew Closson	Fr
DT	92	Kenneth Coleman	Fr
LB	56	Orlando Craig	Fr
DT	84	Jim Davidson	So
CB	21	Zack Dumas	Fr
DT	79	Joe Garber	Sr
ROV	7	Sonny Gordon (C)	Sr
OLB	39	Reggie Graves	Jr
OLB	88	Alex Higdon	Jr
DT	55	Ray Holliman	Sr
OLB	63	Dedrick Howard	Fr
OLB	10	Derek Isaman	So
CB	47	Ray Jackson	Jr
LB	35	Joe Jenkins	Jr
DT	93	Ty Jones	Jr
LB	30	Mike Kee	Sr
NG	62	Charles Keenan	Fr
OLB	14	Eric Kumerow	Jr
LB	8	Scott Leach	Sr
DT	95	Darryl Lee	Sr
S	15	Rich Lishewski	Sr
OLB	99	Michael McCray	So
CB	5	Jim McNulty	Jr
DT	97	Tony Moore	Fr
S	46	Jim Peel	Fr
S	48	Mark Pelini	Fr
DT	90	Fred Ridder	Jr
CB	49	Ceroy Robinson	Fr
CB	29	Greg Rogan	Jr
DT	98	Mike Showalter	Fr
LB	58	Edward Soltis	So
LB	36	Chris Spielman	Jr
LB	57	John Sullivan	So
NG	67	Mike Sullivan	So
NG	54	Pat Thomas	Fr
ROV	26	Brian Tuffin	Jr
S	12	Terry White	Jr
CB	37	William White	Jr
S	28	Anthony Woodford	So
DT	96	Srecko Zizakovic	Fr

Special teams

Pos.	#	Name	Class
K	23	Jeff Compton	So
K	12	Matt Frantz	Jr
K, P	9	Mike Morton	Jr
K	34	Pat O'Morrow	Fr
P, QB	19	Tom Tupa	Jr

Head coach

- Earle Bruce

Coordinators/assistant coaches

- Gary Blackney – Defensive Coordinator (3rd year)
- Bill Conley – Inside Linebackers (3rd year)
- Steve Devine – Offensive Line – Guards, Centers (4th year)
- Randy Hart – Defensive Line (5th year)
- Chuck Heater – Defensive Backs (2nd year)
- Tom Lichtenberg – Quarterbacks, Receivers (1st year)
- Bob Palcic – Offensive Line – Tackles, Tight Ends (1st year)
- Fred Pagac – Outside Linebackers (9th year)
- Leonard Willis – Running Backs (2nd year)

Legend

- (C) Team captain
- (S) Suspended
- (I) Ineligible
- Injured
- Redshirt

=== Depth chart ===
Defense

FS
David Brown
⋅

OLB	ILB	ILB	SLB
Eric Kumerow	Chris Spielman	Mike Kee	Derek Isaman
Scott Leach	⋅	John Sullivan	Mike McCray

ROV
Sonny Gordon
⋅

CB
William White
Ray Jackson

DE	NT	DE
David Schell	Fred Ridder	Mike Showalter
⋅	Mike Sullivan	Henry Brown

CB
Greg Rogan
Zack Dumas

Offense

SE
Cris Carter
Jamie Holland

LT	LG	C	RG	RT
Joe Staysniak	Jeff Uhlenhake	Bob Maggs	Greg Zackeroff	Larry Kotterman
Tim Moxley	Karl Coles	⋅	Jeff Davidson	Jay Shaffer

TE
Ed Taggart
John Hutchison

FL
Nate Harris
Everett Ross

QB
Jim Karsatos
Tom Tupa

Key reserves

FB
George Cooper
Barry Walker

Special teams
PK Matt Frantz
PK Pat O'Morrow
P Tom Tupa

RB
Vince Workman
Jimmy Bryant

== 1987 NFL draftees ==
Player	Round	Pick	Position	NFL club
Cris Carter	4	3	Wide receiver	Philadelphia Eagles
Sonny Gordon	6	157	Defensive back	Cincinnati Bengals
Jamie Holland	7	173	Wide receiver	San Diego Chargers
Scott Leach	9	234	Linebacker	New Orleans Saints
Jim Karsatos	12	322	Quarterback	Miami Dolphins
