= 1986 Michigan Wolverines football team =

American college football season

1986 Michigan Wolverines football

Big Ten co-champion

Rose Bowl, L 15–22 vs. Arizona State
- Conference: Big Ten Conference

Ranking
- Coaches: No. 7
- AP: No. 8
- Record: 11–2 (7–1 Big Ten)
- Head coach: Bo Schembechler (18th season)
- Defensive coordinator: Gary Moeller (9th season)
- MVP: Jim Harbaugh
- Captains: Jim Harbaugh; Andy Moeller
- Home stadium: Michigan Stadium

1986 Big Ten Conference football standings
	Conf.					Overall
Team	W		L		T	W		L		T
No. 8 Michigan +	7	–	1	–	0	11	–	2	–	0
No. 7 Ohio State +	7	–	1	–	0	10	–	3	–	0
No. 16 Iowa	5	–	3	–	0	9	–	3	–	0
Minnesota	5	–	3	–	0	6	–	6	–	0
Michigan State	4	–	4	–	0	6	–	5	–	0
Indiana	3	–	5	–	0	6	–	6	–	0
Illinois	3	–	5	–	0	4	–	7	–	0
Northwestern	2	–	6	–	0	4	–	7	–	0
Purdue	2	–	6	–	0	3	–	8	–	0
Wisconsin	2	–	6	–	0	3	–	9	–	0
+ – Conference co-champions; Rankings from AP Poll

The 1986 Michigan Wolverines football team was an American football team that represented the University of Michigan as a member of the Big Ten Conference during the 1986 NCAA Division I-A football season. In its 18th season under head coach Bo Schembechler, the team compiled an 11–2 record (7–1 against conference opponents), tied for the Big Ten championship, outscored opponents by a total of 379 to 203, and was ranked No. 8 and No. 7, respectively, in the final AP and UPI polls. Late in the season, Schembechler passed Fielding H. Yost as the winningest coach in Michigan football history.

Michigan was ranked No. 2 after winning its first nine games, including victories over Notre Dame and Florida State. The Wolverines were then upset by an unranked Minnesota team led by Rickey Foggie. After quarterback Jim Harbaugh guaranteed a victory over Ohio State, the Wolverines defeated the Buckeyes but lost to Arizona State in the Rose Bowl on New Year's Day.

During the 1986 season, quarterback Jim Harbaugh set Michigan school records for most passing yardage in a game (310 yards vs. Wisconsin), season (2,729 yards), and career (5,449 yards). He finished third in voting for the 1986 Heisman Trophy and was selected as both Michigan's most valuable player and the winner of the Chicago Tribune Silver Football award as the most valuable player in the Big Ten Conference.

The team's other statistical leaders included tailback Jamie Morris with 1,086 rushing yards, split end Ken Higgins with 621 receiving yards, and placekicker Mike Gillette with 59 points scored. Three Michigan players received first-team honors on the 1986 All-America college football team: Garland Rivers at defensive back (consensus), Harbaugh at quarterback (Football News), and offensive tackle Jumbo Elliott (AFCA). Seven Michigan players received first-team honors on the 1986 All-Big Ten Conference football team.

== Schedule ==
Date	Time	Opponent	Rank	Site	TV	Result	Attendance
September 13	3:30 p.m.	at Notre Dame*	No. 3	Notre Dame Stadium; Notre Dame, IN (rivalry)	ABC	W 24–23	59,075
September 20	1:00 p.m.	Oregon State*	No. 3	Michigan Stadium; Ann Arbor, MI	PASS	W 31–12	104,748
September 27	12:30 p.m.	No. 20 Florida State*^{†}	No. 5	Michigan Stadium; Ann Arbor, MI	WTBS	W 20–18	105,507
October 4	7:00 p.m.	at Wisconsin	No. 4	Camp Randall Stadium; Madison, WI	WTBS	W 34–17	75,898
October 11	2:30 p.m.	Michigan State	No. 4	Michigan Stadium; Ann Arbor, MI (rivalry)	CBS	W 27–6	106,141
October 18	2:30 p.m.	No. 8 Iowa	No. 4	Michigan Stadium; Ann Arbor, MI	CBS	W 20–17	105,879
October 25	2:00 p.m.	at Indiana	No. 4	Memorial Stadium; Bloomington, IN		W 38–14	36,964
November 1	1:00 p.m.	Illinois	No. 3	Michigan Stadium; Ann Arbor, MI (rivalry)	PASS	W 69–13	104,122
November 8	1:30 p.m.	at Purdue	No. 3	Ross–Ade Stadium; West Lafayette, IN		W 31–7	61,323
November 15	1:00 p.m.	Minnesota	No. 2	Michigan Stadium; Ann Arbor, MI (Little Brown Jug)	PASS	L 17–20	104,864
November 22	12:00 p.m.	at No. 7 Ohio State	No. 6	Ohio Stadium; Columbus, OH (The Game)	CBS	W 26–24	90,674
December 6	8:00 p.m.	at Hawaii*	No. 4	Aloha Stadium; Halawa HI	ESPN	W 27–10	42,735
January 1, 1987	5:00 p.m.	vs. No. 7 Arizona State*	No. 4	Rose Bowl; Pasadena, CA (Rose Bowl)	NBC	L 15–22	103,168
*Non-conference game; ^{†}Homecoming; Rankings from AP Poll released prior to the game; All times are in Eastern time

== Season summary ==
=== Preseason ===
The 1985 Michigan Wolverines football team compiled a 10–1–1 record and was ranked No. 2 in the final AP and UPI polls. Sixteen starters returned from the 1985 team, including quarterback Jim Harbaugh, running backs Jamie Morris and Gerald White, offensive guard Mark Hammerstein, left tackle Jumbo Elliott, defensive tackle Mark Messner, linebacker Andy Moeller, and cornerback Garland Rivers. Starters who did not return to the team in 1986 included most valuable player Mike Hammerstein, defensive back Brad Cochran, and linebacker Mike Mallory.

Prior to the 1986, there was also turnover in Michigan's coaching staff. Linebacker coach Milan Vooletich took an assistant coaching position at Rice, and receiver coach Bob Thornbladh left for a private business job in Florida. Former NC State head coach Tom Reed replaced Vooletich as linebacker coach. Cam Cameron and Bill Harris were hired to coach tight ends and wide receivers.

Michigan's 1986 recruiting class included running backs Tony Boles, Jarrod Bunch, Leroy Hoard, and David Key (later converted to defensive back), wide receivers Greg McMurtry and Chris Calloway, tight end Tom Dohring (later converted to offensive tackle), fullback Mike Teeter (later converted to linebacker), defensive tackle Warde Manuel, and free safety Vada Murray.

=== Notre Dame ===
Week 1: Michigan at Notre Dame

Team	1	2	3	4	Total
• Michigan	7	3	14	0	24
Notre Dame	7	7	6	3	23

- Date: September 13
- Location: South Bend, IN
- Game start: 3:30 p.m.
- Game attendance: 59,075
- TV announcers (ABC): Keith Jackson, Tim Brant, Al Trautwig

Scoring summary
1	4:34	ND	Tim Brown 3-yard run (John Carney kick)	ND 7–0
1	0:33	MICH	Jamie Morris 8-yard run (Pat Moons kick)	TIE 7–7
2	8:08	ND	Mark Green 1-yard run (Carney kick)	ND 14–7
2	0:52	MICH	Moons 23-yard field goal	ND 14–10
3	8:57	MICH	Morris 1-yard run (Moons kick)	MICH 17–14
3	8:51	MICH	Morris 27-yard pass from Jim Harbaugh (Moons kick)	MICH 24–14
3	3:10	ND	Joel Williams 2-yard pass from Steve Beuerlein (kick failed)	MICH 24–20
4	4:26	ND	Carney 25-yard field goal	MICH 24–23

On September 13, 1986, Michigan, ranked No. 3 in the preseason AP and UPI polls, defeated unranked Notre Dame, 24–23, before a crowd of 59,075 at Notre Dame Stadium in South Bend, Indiana. The game was the first for Lou Holtz as Notre Dame's head coach.

On the game's opening possession, Michigan mounted a six-and-a-half-minute drive to the Notre Dame 25-yard line, but Pat Moons missed a 42-yard field goal. After Michigan's touchdown, Notre Dame drove 75 yards on 13 plays, capped by a three-yard touchdown run by flanker Tim Brown. On its second possession, Michigan followed with an 80-yard, eight-play drive, fueled by a 34-yard catch by John Kolesar, and capped by an eight-yard touchdown run by Jamie Morris.

On Notre Dame's second possession, the Irish again drove downfield, but Reggie Ward fumbled at Michigan's six-yard line, and Michigan recovered the loose ball. Notre Dame's defense held, and Michigan was forced to punt from its own end zone. Monte Robbins' punt was good for only 23 yards, and Notre Dame took over at Michigan's 26-yard line. Eight plays later, Mark Green scored on a one-yard run. After Green's touchdown, Jim Harbaugh led the Wolverines on a seven-minute, 75-yard, 13-play drive, and Pat Moons kicked a 23-yard field goal. Notre Dame led, 14–10, at halftime.

Michigan moved ahead in the third quarter. On the opening drive of the second half, Harbaugh led the Wolverines on a 78-yard, 12-play drive ending with a one-yard touchdown run by Morris. On the kickoff following the touchdown, the kick hit a Notre Dame player and bounced loose with free safety Doug Mallory recovering the ball at the Notre Dame 27-yard line. On the next play from scrimmage, Harbaugh threw a touchdown pass to Morris, and Michigan led 24-14.

On its next possession, Steve Beuerlein led the Irish on a 66-yard, 12-play touchdown drive ending with a two-yard pass from Beuerlein to Joel Williams. John Carney's extra point kick failed, and Michigan led, 24-20, at the end of the third quarter.

In the fourth quarter, Notre Dame drove 62 yards in 10 plays, and a 25-yard field goal by John Carney brought the Irish within one point with 4:26 remaining in the game. Then, with 1:33 remaining in the game, Michigan fullback Bob Perryman fumbled at the Notre Dame 26-yard line, and Notre Dame linebacker Wesley Pritchett recovered the loose ball. Beuerlein quickly led the Irish to Michigan's 28-yard line. With 13 seconds remaining, Carney's 45-yard field goal attempt went wide to the left.

Notre Dame out-gained Michigan, 455 yards to 393 yards. For the Irish, Steve Beuerlein completed 21 of 33 passes for 263 yards, at touchdown, and an interception, and Tim Brown rushed for 65 yards on 12 carries. For the Wolverines, Harbaugh completed 15 of 23 passes for 239 yards and a touchdown, Kolesar caught four passes for 93 yards, and Morris rushed for 77 yards and two touchdowns on 23 carries. Michigan forced four turnovers, including two fumble recoveries by Doug Mallory and a fourth-quarter interception by David Arnold in the end zone. Andy Moeller led the Michigan defense with seven solo tackles and six assists.

=== Oregon State ===
Week 2: Oregon State at Michigan

Team	1	2	3	4	Total
Oregon State	6	6	0	0	12
• Michigan	7	7	3	14	31

- Date: September 20
- Location: Ann Arbor, MI
- Game attendance: 104,748
- Television network: PASS

Scoring summary
1	11:09	OSU	Marty Breen 34-yard field goal)	OSU 3–0
1	8:52	MICH	Gerald White 10-yard pass from Jim Harbaugh (Pat Moons kick)	MICH 7–3
1	0:12	OSU	Breen 47-yard field goal	MICH 7–6
2	8:33	MICH	White 1-yard run (Moons kick)	MICH 14–6
2	0:08	OSU	Damon Medlock 8-yard pass from Erik Wilhelm (pass failed)	MICH 14–12
3	4:21	MICH	Moons 37-yard field goal	MICH 17–12
4	12:19	MICH	Harbaugh 22-yard run (Moons kick)	MICH 24–12
4	5:04	MICH	John Kolesar 25-yard pass from Harbaugh (Moons kick)	MICH 31–12

On September 20, 1986, Michigan defeated Oregon State, 31–12, before a crowd of 104,748 at Michigan Stadium.

On the opening drive of the game, Oregon State mounted a 66-yard, 11-play drive, mostly on passing, and took the lead on a 34-yard field goal. On Michigan's first possession, Michigan started at the 41-yard line after a 29-yard kick return by Jamie Morris. Jim Harbaugh led a 59-yard, six-play touchdown drive capped by a 10-yard pass from Harbaugh to Gerald White. Breen kicked a 47-yard field goal at the end of the first quarter to narrow Michigan's lead to 7-6.

In the second quarter, Michigan extended the lead to 14-6 on a 72-yard, 13-play drive capped by Gerald White's one-yard touchdown run. Oregon State then narrowed the lead to 14-12 with eight second left in the half on an eight-yard touchdown pass from Erik Wilhelm to Damon Medlock.

Michigan scored twice in the fourth quarter, first on a 22-yard touchdown run by Harbaugh and then on a 25-yard touchdown pass from Harbaugh to John Kolesar.

Michigan out-gained Oregon State by 360 yards to 320 yards. For the Wolverines, Harbaugh completed 14 of 18 passes for 171 yards, two touchdowns and one interception, Morris rushed for 140 yards on 20 carries, and Ken Higgins caught four passes for 72 yards. For Oregon State, Wilhelm completed 39 of 64 passes for 339 yards, a touchdown, and an interception, and Dave Montagne caught 10 passes for 117 yards. Oregon State's offense was all in the air, as Michigan's defense held the Beavers to minus 19 rushing yards on 16 attempts.

=== Florida State ===
Week 3: Florida State at Michigan

Team	1	2	3	4	Total
Florida State	3	7	0	8	18
• Michigan	7	3	3	7	20

- Date: September 27
- Location: Ann Arbor, MI
- Game attendance: 105,507
- Television network: WTBS

Scoring summary
1	MICH	Gerald White 2-yard run (Pat Moons kick)	MICH 7–0
1	FSU	Derek Schmidt 30-yard field goal	MICH 7–3
2	MICH	Moons 26-yard field goal	MICH 10–3
2	FSU	Tanner Holloman 3-yard pass from Chip Ferguson (Schmidt kick)	TIE 10–10
3	MICH	Moons 32-yard field goal	MICH 13–10
4	MICH	Thomas Wilcher 7-yard run (Moons kick)	MICH 20–10
4	FSU	Herb Gainer 20-yard pass from Danny McManus (McManus to Carter pass)	MICH 20–18

On September 27, 1986, Michigan defeated Florida State, 20–18, before a homecoming crowd of 105,507 at Michigan Stadium. It was the first game ever played between Michigan and Florida State football programs.

Michigan out-gained Florida State by 332 yards to 285 yards. For the Wolverines, Jim Harbaugh completed nine of 16 passes for 122 yards, and Jamie Morris rushed for 99 yards on 19 carries. For the Seminoles, Chip Ferguson completed six of 19 passes for 73 yards, and Sammie Smith rushed for 75 yards on 13 carries. Michigan's defense recovered a fumble and intercepted three passes, including three by Ivan Hicks.

=== Wisconsin ===
Week 4: Michigan at Wisconsin

Team	1	2	3	4	Total
• Michigan	7	10	14	3	34
Wisconsin	0	3	0	14	17

- Date: October 4
- Location: Madison, WI
- Game start: 7:00 p.m.
- Game attendance: 75,898
- Television network: WTBS

Scoring summary
1	MICH	Thomas Wilcher 5-yard run (Pat Moons kick)	MICH 7–0
2	WIS	Todd Gregoire 35-yard field goal	MICH 7–3
2	MICH	Wilcher 2-yard run (Moons kick)	MICH 14–3
2	MICH	Moons 28-yard field goal	MICH 17–3
3	MICH	Gerald White 3-yard pass from Jim Harbaugh (Moons kick)	MICH 24–3
3	MICH	Harbaugh 4-yard run (Moons kick)	MICH 31–3
4	MICH	Moons 35-yard field goal	MICH 34–3
4	WIS	Brant Kennedy 18-yard pass from Bud Keyes (Gregoire kick)	MICH 34–10
4	WIS	Keyes 1-yard run (Gregoire kick)	MICH 34–17

On October 4, 1986, Michigan defeated Wisconsin, 34–17, before a crowd of 75,898 spectators at Camp Randall Stadium in Madison, Wisconsin. It was the first night game ever played at Camp Randall. The victory was the 200th victory for Bo Schembechler as a head coach.

Michigan quarterback Jim Harbaugh broke Michigan's single-game passing yardage record with 310 passing yards, exceeding the record of 283 yards that he set against Indiana in 1985. Split end Ken Higgins caught eight passes for 165 yards. Michigan's defense held the Badgers to 49 rushing yards and came up with four turnovers, including three interceptions by Andy Moeller and a fumble recovery by J.J. Grant.

=== Michigan State ===
Week 5: Michigan State at Michigan

Team	1	2	3	4	Total
Michigan State	0	3	3	0	6
• Michigan	3	10	7	7	27

- Date: October 11
- Location: Ann Arbor, MI
- Game start: 2:30 p.m.
- Game attendance: 106,141
- Television network: CBS

Scoring summary
1		MICH	Pat Moons 34-yard field goal	MICH 3–0
2		MICH	Jim Harbaugh 1-yard run (Moons kick)	MICH 10–0
2		MSU	Chris Caudell 28-yard field goal	MICH 10–3
2		MICH	Moons 19-yard field goal	MICH 13–3
3	3:39	MICH	John Kolesar 42-yard pass from Harbaugh (Moons kick)	MICH 20–3
3		MSU	Caudell 37-yard field goal	MICH 20–6
4		MICH	Jeff Brown 7-yard pass from Harbaugh (Moons kick)	MICH 27–6

On October 11, 1986, Michigan defeated Michigan State, 27–6, at Michigan Stadium. The crowd of 106,141 was the second largest up to that date in college football history – only 14 spectators shy of the all-time record set at the 1979 Michigan–Ohio State game.

Michigan out-gained Michigan State by 380 yards to 193 yards. For the Wolverines, Jim Harbaugh completed 14 of 22 passes for 219 yards, two touchdowns, and an interception, and Thomas Wilcher rushed for 74 yards on 16 carries. For the Spartans, Dave Yarema completed 13 of 22 passes for 139 yards, and Craig Johnson rushed for 81 yards on 20 carries. The defense sacked Yarema six times and held the Spartans to 54 rushing yards. Andy Moeller led Michigan with nine solo tackles and four assists.

=== Iowa ===
Week 6: Iowa at Michigan

Team	1	2	3	4	Total
Iowa	7	3	0	7	17
• Michigan	3	0	14	3	20

- Date: October 18
- Location: Ann Arbor, MI
- Game attendance: 105,879
- Television network: CBS

Scoring summary
1	10:55	IOWA	Richard Bass 1-yard run (Rob Houghtlin kick)	IOWA 7–0
1	6:21	MICH	Mike Gillette 53-yard field goal	IOWA 7–3
2	12:04	IOWA	Houghtlin 29-yard field goal	MICH 10–3
3	9:35	MICH	Gerald White 25-yard pass from Jim Harbaugh (Pat Moons kick)	TIE 10–10
3	4:08	MICH	G. White 10-yard run (Moons kick)	MICH 17–10
4	11:15	IOWA	Smith 15-yard pass from Vlasic (Houghtlin kick)	TIE 17–17
4	0:00	MICH	Gillette 34-yard field goal	MICH 20–17

On October 18, 1986, Michigan defeated Iowa, 20–17, before a crowd of 105,879 at Michigan Stadium. One year earlier, Iowa placekicker Rob Houghtlin kicked a field goal as time expired to beat the Wolverines. In the 1986 match, the tables were turned as Michigan placekicker Mike Gillette kicked a game-winning 34-yard field goal as time expired. Jim Harbaugh completed 17 of 28 passes for 225 yards, a touchdown, and two interceptions. Jamie Morris rushed for 68 yards on 16 carries and also caught six passes for 57 yards.

=== Indiana ===
Week 7: Michigan at Indiana

Team	1	2	3	4	Total
• Michigan	14	21	3	0	38
Indiana	0	0	0	14	14

- Date: October 25
- Location: Bloomington, IN
- Game attendance: 36,964

Scoring summary
1	11:10	MICH	Jim Harbaugh 3-yard run (Mike Gillette kick)	MICH 7–0
1	3:45	MICH	Gerald White 1-yard run (Gillette kick)	MICH 14–0
2	9:36	MICH	Bob Perryman 13-yard run (Gillette kick)	MICH 21–0
3	4:45	MICH	Perryman 1-yard run (Gillette kick)	MICH 28–0
2	0:20	MICH	Ken Higgins 51-yard pass from Harbaugh (Gillette kick)	MICH 35–0
3	2:00	MICH	Gillette 34-yard field goal	MICH 38–0
4	13:24	IND	Anthony Thompson 3-yard run (Pete Stoyanovich kick)	MICH 38–7
4	2:14	IND	Thompson 3-yard run (Stoyanovich kick)	MICH 38–14

On October 25, 1986, Michigan, ranked No. 4 by both the AP and UPI, defeated Indiana, 38–14, before a crowd of 36,964 at Memorial Stadium in Bloomington, Indiana. It was Michigan's 15th consecutive victory over Indiana.

Michigan took a 35-0 lead at halftime. The Wolverines out-gained the Hoosiers by 588 yards to 238 yards and dominated time of possession by 19:26 to 10:34. Jim Harbaugh completed 16 of 24 passes for 300 yards, including a 51-yard touchdown pass to Ken Higgins. Bob Perryman rushed for 101 yards on 11 carries, and Jamie Morris added 71 yards on 12 carries. For Indiana, Anthony Thompson was held to 46 rushing yards on 12 carries, and Dave Schnell completed eight of 11 passes for 85 yards. The defense also came up with two fumble recoveries and an interception by Garland Rivers.

=== Illinois ===
Week 8: Illinois at Michigan

Team	1	2	3	4	Total
Illinois	10	3	0	0	13
• Michigan	7	20	21	21	69

- Date: November 1
- Location: Ann Arbor, MI
- Game attendance: 104,122
- Television network: PASS

Scoring summary
1	12:03	ILL	Chris Siambekos 47-yard field goal	ILL 3–0
1	5:24	MICH	Jim Harbaugh 13-yard run (Mike Gillette kick)	MICH 7–3
1	0:11	ILL	Brian Menkhausen 3-yard run (Siambekos kick)	ILL 10–7
2	9:38	MICH	Gillette 20-yard field goal	TIE 10–10
2	4:13	MICH	Bob Perryman 1-yard run (Gillette kick)	MICH 17–10
2	2:15	MICH	Paul Jokisch 41-yard pass from Harbaugh (Gillette kick)	MICH 24–10
2	0:26	MICH	Gillette 52-yard field goal	MICH 27–10
2	0:00	ILL	Siambekos 44-yard field goal	MICH 27–13
3	10:55	MICH	Harbaugh 1-yard run (Gillette kick)	MICH 34–13
3	8:12	MICH	Perryman 25-yard run (Gillette kick)	MICH 41–13
3	4:27	MICH	Thomas Wilcher 8-yard run (Gillette kick)	MICH 48–13
4	13:03	MICH	Chris Zurbrugg 1-yard run (Gillette kick)	MICH 55–13
4	10:10	MICH	Zurbrugg 1-yard run (Gillette kick)	MICH 62–13
4	2:26	MICH	Taylor 6-yard run (Gillette kick)	MICH 69–13

On November 1, 1986, Michigan defeated Illinois, 69–13, before a crowd of 104,122 at Michigan Stadium. After the victory, Michigan presented the game ball to special-teams coach Alex Agase who underwent heart surgery the day before the game.

Michigan scored nine touchdowns (eight by rushing) and out-gained Illinois by 501 yards to 226 yards. For the Illini, Brian Menkhuasen completed 15 of 31 passes for 109 yards, and Keith Jones rushed for 74 yards on 13 carries. For the Wolverines, Jim Harbaugh completed 11 of 13 passes for 224 yards, including a 41-yard touchdown pass to Paul Jokisch. Three Michigan players had more than 70 receiving yards: Jokisch (79), Greg McMurtry (76), and Gerald White (74). Michigan also came up with three turnovers (two interceptions and a fumble recovery) and blocked a punt.

=== Purdue ===
Week 9: Michigan at Purdue

Team	1	2	3	4	Total
• Michigan	7	17	7	0	31
Purdue	0	0	0	7	7

- Date: November 9
- Location: West Lafayette, IN
- Game attendance: 61,323

Scoring summary
1	0:29	MICH	Bob Perryman 5-yard run (Mike Gillette kick)	MICH 7–0
2	13:44	MICH	Paul Jokisch 4-yard pass from Jim Harbaugh (Gillette kick)	MICH 14–0
2	6:14	MICH	Perryman 1-yard run (Gillette kick)	MICH 21–0
2	0:07	MICH	Gillette 36-yard field goal	MICH 24–0
3	9:01	MICH	Jamie Morris 2-yard run (Gillette kick)	MICH 31–0
4	9:04	PUR	Jerry Chaney 13-yard pass from Doug Downing (Jonathan Briggs kick)	MICH 31–7

On November 8, 1986, Michigan, ranked No. 3 by the AP and UPI, defeated Purdue, 31–7, before a crowd of 61,323 at Ross–Ade Stadium in West Lafayette, Indiana. The victory was Schembechler's 165 at Michigan, tying him with Fielding H. Yost for the most career wins at the school

Michigan out-gained Purdue, 416 yards to 184 yards and also controlled time of possession by a margin of 36:00 to 24:00. For the Boilermakers, Doug Downing completed 12 of 24 passes for 108 yards, and James Medlock rushed for 64 yards on 16 carries. For the Wolverines, Jim Harbaugh completed 14 of 20 passes for 154 yards, a touchdown, and an interception, and Jamie Morris rushed for 91 yards on 16 carries. With his 14 completions, Harbaugh passed Steve Smith to become Michigan's career record holder with 332 pass completions

=== Minnesota ===
Week 10: Minnesota at Michigan

Team	1	2	3	4	Total
• Minnesota	0	7	10	3	20
Michigan	0	10	0	7	17

- Date: November 15
- Location: Ann Arbor, MI
- Game attendance: 104,864
- Television network: PASS

Scoring summary
2		MINN	Mel Anderson 15-yard pass from Rickey Foggie (Chip Lohmiller kick)	MINN 7–0
2		MICH	Mike Gillette 35-yard field goal	MINN 7–3
2		MICH	Thomas Wilcher 8-yard run (Gillette kick)	MICH 10–7
3		MINN	Foggie 5-yard run (Lohmiller kick)	MINN 14–10
3		MINN	Lohmiller 25-yard field goal	MINN 17–10
4	2:26	MICH	Gerald White 1-yard run (Gillette kick)	TIE 17–17
4	0:00	MINN	Lohmiller 30-yard field goal	MINN 20–17

On November 15, 1986, Michigan, ranked No. 2 by the AP and UPI, was upset by unranked Minnesota, 20–17, before a crowd of 104,864 at Michigan Stadium. It was Minnesota's first victory in the annual Little Brown Jug game since 1977.

Michigan turned the ball over three times in its own territory, leading to 17 points for the Golden Gophers. As a result, Michigan trailed, 17-10, at the end of the third quarter. Late in the fourth quarter, the Wolverines drove down the field and tied the game with 2:26 remaining on a touchdown run by Gerald White. Minnesota then drove 58 yards in the final two minutes and retook the lead on the final play of the game – a 30-yard field goal by Chip Lohmiller.

Michigan out-gained Minnesota by 341 yards to 321 yards. Rickey Foggie led Minnesota with 94 passing yards and 78 rushing yards and had both passing and rushing touchdowns. For the Wolverines, Jim Harbaugh completed 14 of 22 passes for 207 yards, a touchdown, and an interception, and Jamie Morris rushed for 78 yards on 13 carries.

=== Ohio State ===
Week 11: Michigan at Ohio State

Team	1	2	3	4	Total
• Michigan	3	3	13	7	26
Ohio State	14	0	3	7	24

- Date: November 22
- Location: Columbus, OH
- Game start: 12:00 p.m. CDT
- Game attendance: 90,674
- Game weather: Sunny • 55 °F (13 °C) • Wind 10 S
- Referee: Tom Quinn
- TV announcers (CBS): Brent Musburger, Ara Parseghian

Scoring summary
1	10:47	OSU	Cris Carter 4-yard pass from Jim Karsatos (Matt Frantz kick)	OSU 7–0
1	4:18	MICH	Mike Gillette 32-yard field goal	OSU 7–3
1	3:03	OSU	Vince Workman 46-yard run (Frantz kick)	OSU 14–3
2	6:47	MICH	Gillette 34-yard field goal	OSU 14–6
3	8:53	MICH	Jamie Morris 4-yard run (Gillette kick)	OSU 14–13
3	5:26	OSU	Frantz 27-yard field goal	OSU 17–13
3	3:53	MICH	Morris 8-yard run (pass failed)	MICH 19–17
4	12:46	MICH	Thomas Wilcher 7-yard run (Gillette kick)	MICH 26–17
4	9:42	OSU	Carter 17-yard pass from Karsatos (Frantz kick)	MICH 26–24

On November 22, 1986, Michigan defeated Ohio State, 26–24, in Columbus, Ohio. The crowd of 90,674 was the largest to that date at Ohio Stadium. The victory was Bo Schembechler's 166th at Michigan, passing Fielding H. Yost's school record of 165 coaching victories.

On the Monday before the game, Michigan quarterback Jim Harbaugh issued a public guarantee that the Wolverines would beat Ohio State: "I guarantee we will beat Ohio State and go to Pasadena. . . . It's a great feeling to beat Ohio State, and we're going to have that feeling Saturday." Harbaugh's guarantee was made on the same day that his father, Jack Harbaugh, was fired as the head football coach at Western Michigan.

Ohio State returned the opening kickoff to Michigan's 45-yard line. Quarterback Jim Karsatos led the Buckeyes on a touchdown drive culminating with a four-yard pass to Cris Carter. After the touchdown, Jamie Morris returned the kickoff to the 40-yard line. Harbaugh led the Wolverines to the Ohio State 15-yard line, and Mike Gillette kicked a 32-yard field goal.

On Ohio State's second possession, Vince Workman ran 46 yards for a touchdown. On Michigan's second possession, Harbaugh hit Greg McMurtry in the hands with a 43-yard pass at the goal line, but the ball bounced from McMurtry's hands for an incomplete pass. Harbaugh then threw an interception. On Ohio State's third possession, Matt Frantz missed a 43-yard field goal attempt.

Midway through the second quarter, Harbaugh led the Wolverines on a 62-yard drive to the 18-yard line, Gillette kicked a line-drive field goal. On Michigan's next possession, Harbaugh led a long drive deep into Ohio State territory, but he was intercepted at the goal line, and Ohio State led, 14-6, at halftime.

On the opening possession of the second half, Michigan mounted an 83-yard, 14-play touchdown drive that consumed six minutes and seven seconds. Jamie Morris scored on a five-yard pitchout from Harbaugh. On its next possession, Ohio State drove 65 yards on nine plays, and Frantz kicked a 27-yard field goal.

After the field goal, Michigan drove 76 yards on four plays. On the first play of the drive, Morris ran 51 yards to the Ohio State 24-yard line. Morris then scored on an eight-yard run. Michigan attempted a two-point conversion, but Harbaugh's pass fell incomplete in the end zone. Michigan led, 19-17, at the end of the third quarter.

Early in the fourth quarter, Michigan scored again on a seven-yard run by Thomas Wilcher, capping an 85-yard, eight-play drive. Michigan led, 26-17, with 12:46 remaining in the game.

On Ohio State's next possession after the Wilcher touchdown, Karsatos was intercepted by linebacker Andree McIntyre at Ohio State's 37-yard line. Michigan attempted a field goal, but the kick was blocked.

With 9:42 remaining, Karsatos threw a 17-yard touchdown pass to Cris Carter, capping a 56-yard drive. Michigan's lead was narrowed to 26-24.

With 3:17 remaining in the game, Wilcher fumbled at the Ohio State 37-yard line, and Sonny Gordon recovered for the Buckeyes. Ohio State advanced to Michigan's 28-yard line, and on fourth-and-two, with 1:01 remaining, placekicker Matt Frantz missed a 45-yard field goal that would have put the Buckeyes in the lead.

Michigan out-gained Ohio State by 529 yards to 358 yards and led in time of possession by a margin of 35:39 to 24:21. For the Wolverines, Harbaugh completed 19 of 29 passes for 261 yards but threw two interceptions. Morris rushed for 210 yards and two touchdowns on 29 carries. For the Buckeyes, Karsatos] completed 15 of 27 passes for 188 yards, two touchdowns, and an interception. Workman rushed for 126 yards and a touchdown on 21 carries, and Carter had seven receptions for 75 yards and two touchdowns.

=== Hawaii ===
Week 12: Michigan at Hawaii

Team	1	2	3	4	Total
• Michigan	3	0	7	17	27
Hawaii	0	3	7	0	10

- Date: December 6
- Location: Honolulu
- Game attendance: 42,735
- Television network: ESPN

Scoring summary
1	0:40	MICH	Mike Gillette 40-yard field goal)	MICH 3–0
2	13:30	HAW	Valverde 25-yard field goal	TIE 3–3
3	10:15	MICH	Jim Harbaugh 4-yard run (Gillette kick)	MICH 10–3
3	5:24	HAW	Permetter 1-yard run (Valverde kick)	TIE 10–10
4	14:17	MICH	Perryman 2-yard run (Gillette kick)	MICH 17–10
4	9:38	MICH	Perryman 55-yard run (Gillette kick)	MICH 24–10
4	2:39	MICH	Gillette 27-yard field goal	MICH 27–10

On December 6, 1986, Michigan defeated Hawaii, 27–10, before a crowd of 42,735 at Aloha Stadium in Honolulu. The game was the first meeting between the Hawaii and Michigan football programs.

Michigan out-gained Hawaii by 397 yards to 292 yards. For the Rainbow Warriors, Tipton completed 21 of 33 passes for 207 yards, and Crowell rushed for 49 yards on 11 carries. For the Wolverines, Jim Harbaugh completed nine of 15 passes for 125 yards. Michigan ran on 49 of 64 plays, and two Wolverine backs rushed for over 100 yards: Jamie Morris with 118 yards on 21 carries; and Bob Perryman with 107 yards on 14 carries. Greg McMurtry caught three passes for 74 yards. Andy Moeller led the defense with 10 solo tackles and three assists. Monte Robbins also broke a Michigan record with an 82-yard punt.

=== Arizona State (Rose Bowl) ===
Rose Bowl: Michigan vs. Arizona State

Team	1	2	3	4	Total
Michigan	8	7	0	0	15
• Arizona State	0	13	6	3	22

- Date: January 1
- Location: Pasadena, CA
- Game attendance: 103,168
- TV announcers (NBC): Dick Enberg, Merlin Olsen

Scoring summary
1	MICH	Jamie Morris 18-yard run (Mike Gillette to Gerald White pass)	MICH 8–0
2	ASU	Kent Bostrom 37-yard field goal	MICH 8–3
2	MICH	Jim Harbaugh 2-yard run (Gillette kick)	MICH 15–3
2	ASU	Bostrom 27-yard field goal	MICH 15–6
2	ASU	Bruce Hill 4-yard pass from Jeff Van Raaphorst (Bostrom kick)	MICH 15–13
3	ASU	Hill 1-yard pass from Van Raaphorst (pass failed)	ASU 19–15
3	ASU	Bostrom 25-yard field goal	ASU 22–15

On January 1, 1987, Michigan, ranked No. 4 by the AP, lost to No. 7 Arizona State, 22–15, before a crowd of 103,168 in the 1987 Rose Bowl in Pasadena, California. It was the first meeting between the Michigan and Arizona State football programs.

Arizona State out-gained Michigan by 381 yard to 225 yards. For the Wolverines, Jim Harbaugh completed 13 of 23 passes for 172 yards and threw three interceptions. Arizona State held Michigan to a total of 53 rushing yards with Jamie Morris totaling 47 yards on 16 carries. Defensive tackle Dave Folkertsma led the Michigan defense with 10 solo tackles and one assist. For the Sun Devils, quarterback Jeff Van Raaphorst completed 16 of 30 passes for 193 yards and two touchdowns, and Darryl Harris rushed for 109 yards on 23 carries.

Arizona State head coach John Cooper was hired as Ohio State's head coach in 1988.

=== Award season ===
During the 1986 season, quarterback Jim Harbaugh set Michigan's single-game, single-season, and career records for passing yardage. He finished third (behind Miami quarterback Vinny Testaverde and Temple running back Paul Palmer) in voting for the 1986 Heisman Trophy and was selected as both Michigan's most valuable player and the winner of the Chicago Tribune Silver Football award as the most valuable player in the Big Ten Conference.

Three Michigan players received first-team honors on the 1986 All-America college football team:

- Defensive back Garland Rivers was a consensus All-American, receiving first-team honors from the American Football Coaches Association (AFCA), Walter Camp Football Foundation, and Newspaper Enterprise Association.
- Harbaugh received first-team honors from Football News and second-team honors from the Associated Press (AP) and United Press International (UPI).
- Offensive tackle Jumbo Elliott received first-team honors from the AFCA, second-team honors from the UPI, and third-team honors from the AP.

Seven Michigan players received first-team honors on the 1986 All-Big Ten Conference football team: Harbaugh at quarterback (AP-1, UPI-1); Jamie Morris at running back (AP-2, UPI-1); Mark Hammerstein at offensive guard (AP-1, UPI-1); Elliott at offensive tackle (AP-1, UPI-1); Mark Messner at defensive line (AP-1, UPI-2); Andy Moeller at linebacker (AP-1, UPI-1); and Rivers at defensive back (AP-2, UPI-1).

Team awards were presented as follows:

- Most Valuable Player: Jim Harbaugh
- Meyer Morton Award: Doug Mallory
- John Maulbetsch Award: Jeff Brown
- Frederick Matthei Award: Jamie Morris
- Arthur Robinson Scholarship Award: Ken Higgins
- Dick Katcher Award: Dieter Heren
- Hugh Rader Jr. Award: Mike Hammerstein
- Robert P. Ufer Award: Andy Moeller

== Personnel ==
=== Letter winners, offense ===
- Andrew Borowski, senior, 6'4", 258 pounds, Cincinnati, Ohio - center
- Jeffrey Brown, sophomore, 6'4", 224 pounds, Shaker Heights, Ohio - started 13 games at tight end
- Dave Chester, junior, 6'2", 255 pounds, Titusville, Florida - started 2 games at left guard and 1 game at right guard
- Michael Dames, junior, 6'2", 258 pounds, Miami, Florida - started 11 games at left guard
- Jumbo Elliott, senior, 6'7", 306 pounds, Lake Ronkonkoma, NY - started 12 games at right tackle
- Mark Hammerstein, senior, 6'3", 285 pounds, Wapakoneta, Ohio - started 12 games at right guard and 1 game at right tackle
- Jim Harbaugh, senior, 6'3", 207 pounds, Palo Alto, California - started 13 games at quarterback
- Ken Higgins, senior, 6'2", 190 pounds, Battle Creek, Michigan - started 4 games at split end
- Mike Husar, junior, 6'3", 289 pounds, Chicago - started 11 games at left tackle
- Paul Jokisch, senior, 6'8", 239 pounds, Clarkston, Michigan - started 8 games at split end
- John Kolesar, sophomore, 6'0", 188 pounds, Westlake, Ohio - started 8 games at flanker
- Phil Logas, senior, 5'11", 165 pounds, Altamonte Springs, Florida - split end
- Greg McMurtry, freshman, 6'3", 200 pounds, Brockton, Massachusetts - started 5 games at flanker
- Jamie Morris, junior, 5'7", 179 pounds, Ayer, Massachusetts - started 11 games at tailback
- Bob Perryman, senior, 6'1", 226 pounds, Buzzard's Bay, Massachusetts - started 2 games at fullback and 1 game at split end
- Jerry Quaerna, senior, 6'7", 282 pounds, Ft. Atkinson, Wisconsin - started 2 games at left tackle
- John Vitale, junior, 6'1", 289 pounds, Detroit - started 13 games at center
- Phil Webb, junior, 6'1", 202 pounds, Romeo, Michigan - tailback
- Gerald White, senior, 6'0", 220 pounds, Titusville, Florida - started 11 games at fullback
- John Whitledge, Delton, Michigan - quarterback
- Thomas Wilcher, senior, 5'10", 188 pounds, Detroit - started 2 games at tailback
- Chris Zurbrugg, senior, 6'1", 207 pounds, Alliance, Ohio - quarterback

=== Letter winners, defense ===
- Bobby Abrams, sophomore, 6'4", 200 pounds, Detroit - defensive back
- David Arnold, sophomore, 6'3", 196 pounds, Warren, Michigan - started 2 games at cornerback
- John Balourdos, Chicago - linebacker
- Allen Bishop, senior, 5'10", 185 pounds, Miami, Florida - started 1 game at cornerback
- Erik Campbell, junior, 5'10", 171 pounds, Gary, Indiana - started 11 games at cornerback and 2 games at free safety
- Dave Folkertsma, senior, 6'5", 263 pounds, Grand Rapids, Michigan - started 12 games at defensive tackle
- Tony Gant, senior, 6'0", 180 pounds, Fremont, Ohio - started 11 games at free safety
- J. J. Grant, sophomore, 6'1", 237 pounds, Liverpool, NY - linebacker
- Billy Harris, senior, 6'0", 270 pounds, Xenia, Ohio - started 13 games at middle guard
- Rick Hassel, sophomore, 6'0", 191 pounds, Cincinnati, Ohio - defensive back
- Dieter Heren, senior, 6'3", 219 pounds, Fort Wayne, Indiana - started 11 games at outside linebacker
- John Herrmann, sophomore, 6'4", 255 pounds, Sussex, Wisconsin - defensive tackle
- Ivan Hicks, senior, 6'2", 178 pounds, Pennsauken, New Jersey - started 11 games at strong safety
- Joseph Holland, sophomore, 6'3", 216 pounds, Birmingham, Michigan - linebacker
- Doug Mallory, senior, 6'1", 194 pounds, DeKalb, Illinois - started 2 games at strong safety
- Andree McIntyre, senior, 6'1" 241 pounds, Chicago - started 9 games at inside linebacker
- Mark Messner, junior, 6'3", 248 pounds, Holland, Michigan - started 13 games at defensive tackle
- Andy Moeller, senior, 6'0", 222 pounds, Ann Arbor, Michigan - started 13 games at inside linebacker
- Ken Mouton, junior, 6'0", 200 pounds, Naples, Florida - defensive back
- Garland Rivers, senior, 6'1", 187 pounds, Canton, Ohio - started 12 games at cornerback
- Tim Schulte, senior, 6'3", 211 pounds, Villa Hills, Kentucky - outside linebacker
- Todd Schulte, senior, 6'2", 223 pounds, Villa Hills, Kentucky - started 2 games at inside linebacker
- Mike Teeter, freshman, 6'4", 240 pounds, Fruitport, Michigan - linebacker
- Steve Thibert, senior, 6'5", 240 pounds, Union Lake, Michigan - started 1 game at outside linebacker
- Derrick Walker, sophomore, 6'1", 289 pounds, Glenwood, Illinois - inside linebacker
- Jack Walker, senior, 6'4", 260 pounds, Westland, Michigan - started 1 game at defensive tackle
- Peter Wentworth, Louisville, Kentucky - linebacker
- Brent White, sophomore, 6'5", 227 pounds, Dayton, Ohio - defensive tackle
- John Willingham, junior, 6'3", 235 pounds, Dayton, Ohio - started 12 games at outside linebacker

=== Letter winners, special teams ===
- Mike Gillette, sophomore, 6'1", 185 pounds - placekicker and punter
- Pat Moons, senior, 5'8", 165 pounds, Ft. Lauderdale, Florida - placekicker
- Monte Robbins, senior, 6'4", 202 pounds, Great Bend, Kansas - punter
- Rick Sutkiewicz, junior, 6'3", 209 pounds, Troy, Michigan - placekicker
- Jeffrey Robertson, senior, 5'6" 165 pounds, Pontiac, Michigan - punter

=== Coaching staff ===
- Head coach: Bo Schembechler
- Assistant coaches:

- Gary Moeller - defensive coordinator and assistant head coach
- Lloyd Carr - defensive backs coach
- Jerry Meter - defensive line coach
- Tirrel Burton - running back coach
- Elliot Uzelac - offensive line coach
- Jerry Hanlon - quarterback coach
- Bill Harris - receivers coach
- Cam Cameron - tight ends coach
- Tom Reed - linebacker coach
- Alex Agase - special teams coach

- Trainer: Russ Miller
- Manager: Keith Webster

== Statistical leaders ==
=== Rushing ===
Player	Att	Net Yards	Yds/Att	TD
Jamie Morris	209	1,086	5.2	6
Bob Perryman	117	543	4.6	8
Thomas Wilcher	91	397	4.4	6
Gerald White	88	323	3.7	5
Jim Harbaugh	94	118	1.3	8

=== Passing ===
Player	Att	Comp	Int	Comp %	Yds	Yds/Comp	TD
Jim Harbaugh	277	180	11	65.0	2,729	15.2	10
Chris Zurbrugg	7	2	1	28.6	68	34.0	0

=== Receiving ===
Player	Recp	Yds	Yds/Recp	TD
Ken Higgins	33	621	18.8	31
Greg McMurtry	22	508	23.1	0
Gerald White	38	408	10.7	3
John Kolesar	15	402	26.8	2
Jamie Morris	33	287	8.7	1
Paul Jokisch	11	229	20.8	2

=== Scoring ===
Player	TDs	XPM	FGM	Points
Mike Gillette	0	26	11	59
Bob Perryman	6	0	0	36
Gerald White	8	0	0	48
Jim Harbaugh	8	0	0	48
Jamie Morris	7	0	0	42
Pat Moons	0	18	8	42
Thomas Wilcher	6	0	0	36
