= 1986 Illinois Fighting Illini football team =

American college football season

1986 Illinois Fighting Illini football
- Conference: Big Ten Conference
- Record: 4–7 (3–5 Big Ten)
- Head coach: Mike White (7th season)
- MVP: Keith Jones
- Captains: Scott Davis; Sam Ellsworth; Mark Dennis; Shane Lamb
- Home stadium: Memorial Stadium

1986 Big Ten Conference football standings
	Conf.					Overall
Team	W		L		T	W		L		T
No. 8 Michigan +	7	–	1	–	0	11	–	2	–	0
No. 7 Ohio State +	7	–	1	–	0	10	–	3	–	0
No. 16 Iowa	5	–	3	–	0	9	–	3	–	0
Minnesota	5	–	3	–	0	6	–	6	–	0
Michigan State	4	–	4	–	0	6	–	5	–	0
Indiana	3	–	5	–	0	6	–	6	–	0
Illinois	3	–	5	–	0	4	–	7	–	0
Northwestern	2	–	6	–	0	4	–	7	–	0
Purdue	2	–	6	–	0	3	–	8	–	0
Wisconsin	2	–	6	–	0	3	–	9	–	0
+ – Conference co-champions; Rankings from AP Poll

The 1986 Illinois Fighting Illini football team was an American football team that represented the University of Illinois at Urbana-Champaign as a member of the Big Ten Conference during the 1986 NCAA Division I-A football season. In their seventh year under head coach Mike White, the Fighting Illini compiled a 4–7 record (3–5 in conference game), tied for sixth place in the Big Ten, and were outscored by a total of 299 to 189.

The team's statistical leaders included quarterback Shane Lamb (1,414 passing yards, 50.7% completion percentage), running back Keith Jones (534 rushing yards, 4.0 yards per carry), wide receiver Stephen Pierce (43 receptions for 602 yards), and kicker Chris Siambekos (61 points, 19 of 20 extra points, 14 of 19 field goals).

The team played its home games at Memorial Stadium in Champaign, Illinois.

== Schedule ==
Date	Opponent	Site	Result	Attendance	Source
September 6	Louisville*	Memorial Stadium; Champaign, IL	W 23–0	72,822	
September 13	at USC*	Los Angeles Memorial Coliseum; Los Angeles, CA	L 16–31	51,496	
September 20	No. 6 Nebraska*	Memorial Stadium; Champaign, IL	L 14–59	75,869	
October 4	at Ohio State	Ohio Stadium; Columbus, OH (Illibuck)	L 0–14	90,030	
October 11	Purdue	Memorial Stadium; Champaign, IL (rivalry)	W 34–27	73,720	
October 18	Michigan State	Memorial Stadium; Champaign, IL	L 21–29	75,083	
October 25	at Wisconsin	Camp Randall Stadium; Madison, WI	L 9–15	76,983	
November 1	at No. 3 Michigan	Michigan Stadium; Ann Arbor, MI (rivalry)	L 13–69	104,122	
November 8	No. 16 Iowa	Memorial Stadium; Champaign, IL	W 20–16	75,190	
November 15	at Indiana	Memorial Stadium; Bloomington, IN (rivalry)	W 21–16	34,572	
November 22	Northwestern	Memorial Stadium; Champaign, IL (rivalry)	L 18–23	70,568	
*Non-conference game; Rankings from AP Poll released prior to the game

== Games summaries ==
=== No. 6 Nebraska ===
Nebraska at Illinois [box score]

Team	1	2	3	4	Total
• No. 6 Cornhuskers	28	10	14	7	59
Fighting Illini	0	7	0	7	14

- Date: September 20, 1986
- Location: Memorial Stadium, Champaign, Illinois
- Game attendance: 75,865
- TV announcers (Turner Sports): Skip Caray (play-by-play), Paul Hornung (analyst)

=== At Ohio State ===
Illinois at Ohio State

Team	1	2	3	4	Total
Fighting Illini	0	0	0	0	0
• Buckeyes	0	14	0	0	14

- Date: October 4
- Location: Ohio Stadium, Columbus, Ohio
- Game attendance: 90,030

=== At No. 3 Michigan ===
Illinois at Michigan

Team	1	2	3	4	Total
Fighting Illini	10	3	0	0	13
• No. 3 Wolverines	7	20	21	21	69

- Date: November 1
- Location: Michigan Stadium, Ann Arbor, Michigan
- Game attendance: 104,122

Scoring summary
1	12:03	ILL	Chris Siambekos 47-yard field goal	ILL 3–0
1	5:24	MICH	Jim Harbaugh 13-yard run (Mike Gillette kick)	MICH 7–3
1	0:11	ILL	Brian Menkhausen 3-yard run (Siambekos kick)	ILL 10–7
2	9:38	MICH	Gillette 20-yard field goal	TIE 10–10
2	4:13	MICH	Bob Perryman 1-yard run (Gillette kick)	MICH 17–10
2	2:15	MICH	Paul Jokisch 41-yard pass from Harbaugh (Gillette kick)	MICH 24–10
2	0:26	MICH	Gillette 52-yard field goal	MICH 27–10
2	0:00	ILL	Siambekos 44-yard field goal	MICH 27–13
3	10:55	MICH	Harbaugh 1-yard run (Gillette kick)	MICH 34–13
3	8:12	MICH	Perryman 25-yard run (Gillette kick)	MICH 41–13
3	4:27	MICH	Thomas Wilcher 8-yard run (Gillette kick)	MICH 48–13
4	13:03	MICH	Chris Zurbrugg 1-yard run (Gillette kick)	MICH 55–13
4	10:10	MICH	Zurbrugg 1-yard run (Gillette kick)	MICH 62–13
4	2:26	MICH	Taylor 6-yard run (Gillette kick)	MICH 69–13

=== No. 16 Iowa ===
Iowa at Illinois

Team	1	2	3	4	Total
No. 16 Hawkeyes	3	7	0	6	16
• Fighting Illini	0	0	7	13	20

- Date: November 8
- Location: Memorial Stadium, Champaign, Illinois
- Game attendance: 75,190

Scoring summary
1	IOWA	Houghtlin 36-yard field goal	IOWA 3–0
2	IOWA	Hudson 2-yard run (Houghtlin kick)	IOWA 10–0
3	Illinois	Pierce 54-yard pass from Menkhausen (Siambekos kick)	IOWA 10–7
4	Illinois	Menkhausen 1-yard run (Siambekos kick)	Illinois 14–10
4	Illinois	Siambekos 29-yard field goal	Illinois 17–10
4	Illinois	Siambekos 42-yard field goal	Illinois 20–10
4	IOWA	Harmon 3-yard run (pass failed)	Illinois 20–16
