= 1986 All-American Bowl =

Florida State Seminoles	Indiana Hoosiers
(6–4–1)	(6–5)
27	13
Head coach: Bobby Bowden	Head coach: Bill Mallory
	1	2	3	4	Total
Florida State	6	7	7	7	27
Indiana	3	0	7	3	13
- Date: December 31, 1986
- Season: 1986
- Stadium: Legion Field
- Location: Birmingham, Alabama
- MVP: RB Sammie Smith (Florida State)
- Referee: Robert Aillet (SEC)
- Attendance: 30,000

United States TV coverage
- Network: TBS
- Announcers: Bob Neal, Tim Foley, and Paul Hornung

The 1986 All-American Bowl featured a meeting between the Florida State Seminoles and the Indiana Hoosiers. FSU, coached by Bobby Bowden, had a 6-4-1 record going into the bowl game and Indiana, coached by Bill Mallory had a 6–5 record.

== Game summary ==
Tailback Sammie Smith had his best game to date as a Seminole, rushing for 205 yards and two touchdowns, as the FSU scored a 27-13 win over Indiana in the 10th annual All-American Bowl.

Although FSU was outgained in total yards and time of possession, Indiana seemed to be its own worst enemy, missing four scoring opportunities inside the FSU 31-yard line. The Hoosiers gained 383 yards to the Seminoles' 342 and held on to the ball almost 15 more minutes than FSU.

The Hoosiers scored first in the game. After driving 60 yards in 13 plays, Pete Stoyanovich kicked a 35-yard field goal to give his team the 3-0 lead.

FSU then opened up it running game and found that its weapon for the evening would be Smith, a redshirt freshman. He ran for 28 yards on four carries and caught a pass for 7 more as the Seminoles moved down field. Capping the drive, Sammie took it in from the 4-yard line. Hoosier lineback Van Waiters blocked the PAT attempt. FSU took a 6-3 lead.

Following a missed 47-yard field goal attempt by Stoyanovich, FSU scored on a 9-yard run by Smith. The Seminoles would carry that 13-3 lead into intermission after another Indiana drive stalled with a missed field goal. The Hoosiers had moved to the FSU 5-yard line, but following a penalty and a Terry Warren sack of IU quarterback Dave Kramme, Stoyanovich missed from 41 yards.

Florida State made it 20-3 on the first possession of the second half when Smith ran three times for 20 yards and the Holloman brothers, Darrin and Tanner, did the rest. The drive was sparked by a 36-yard reverse by Darrin, while senior fullback Tanner collected 15 yards, including the 8 yard TD.

IU came right back on a long drive of its own, but Stoyanovich missed a third time, this time from 49 yards out. The Hoosier defense continued to hold the Seminoles and late in the third period, Indiana made an attempt to get back into the game. First, Tony Buford pulled in a 20-yard pass from Kramme at the FSU 37. Freshman running back Anthony Thompson then gained 17 tough yards on five carries to push the Hoosiers to the FSU 4. Fullback Andre Powell closed the gap to 20-10 with a two-yard plunge at the 1:19 mark of the quarter.

Following a Danny McManus interception in the opening minutes of the fourth quarter, Indiana drove 56 yards on 7 plays and a Stoyanovich 30 yard field goal closed the score to 20-13.

But FSU put its fans' worries aside, marching right back behind a handful of carries by Smith that netted 44 yards, and scoring on a 10-yard run by Tanner Holloman.

For his performance, Smith was awarded the MVP trophy and the Seminoles finished the season with a 7-4-1 record. Indiana finished the season with a 6-6 record.
