= 1986 Holiday Bowl =

1986 SeaWorld Holiday Bowl
Iowa Hawkeyes	San Diego State Aztecs
(8–3)	(8–3)
Big Ten	WAC
39	38
Head coach: Hayden Fry	Head coach: Denny Stolz
AP / Coaches; 19 / RV
	1	2	3	4	Total
Iowa	7	6	8	18	39
San Diego State	6	15	7	10	38
- Date: December 30, 1986
- Season: 1986
- Stadium: Jack Murphy Stadium
- Location: San Diego, California
- MVP: Offensive: Todd Santos (SDSU); Defensive: Richard Brown (SDSU)
- Referee: Gordon Riese (Pac-10)
- Halftime show: Marching bands
- Attendance: 59,473
- Payout: US$661,423 per team

United States TV coverage
- Network: ESPN
- Announcers: Jay Randolph and Dave Logan

The 1986 Holiday Bowl was a college football bowl game played December 30, 1986, in San Diego, California. It was part of the 1986 NCAA Division I-A football season. It featured the 19th-ranked Iowa Hawkeyes, and the unranked San Diego State Aztecs.

== Scoring summary ==
Iowa scored first on a 5-yard touchdown run from Rick Bayless, taking a 7–0 lead. San Diego State answered on a 6-yard touchdown pass from Todd Santos to running back Chris Hardy to make it 7–6 Iowa, closing the 1st quarter of scoring. In the second quarter, Santos fired a 44-yard bomb to Matt Jakson, as SDSU took a 14–7 lead. Iowa's Mark Vlasic scored from 1 yard out, and SDSU led 14–13. Todd Santos threw a 28-yard touchdown pass to Monty Gilbreath, giving San Diego State a 21–13 lead at halftime.

In the third quarter, Gilmore scored on a 1-yard touchdown run to make it 28–13 SDSU. Iowa responded when Hudson scored on a 1-yard touchdown run, making it 28–21 SDSU. In the fourth quarter, Chris Hardy scored on a 6-yard run, and SDSU went up 35–21. Iowa responded with a 29-yard touchdown pass from Vlasic to Cook, making it 35–29. Iowa then took the lead on a 4-yard score from Vlasic to Flagg.

San Diego State's kicker Kevin Rahill kicked a 21-yard field goal with 47 seconds left to put the Aztecs up 38–36. Iowa's Kevin Harmon returned the ensuing kickoff 48 yards to the SDSU 37-yard line. Iowa kicker Rob Houghtlin kicked a 41-yard field goal, as Iowa won 39–38.
