= 1986 Miami Hurricanes football team =

American college football season

1986 Miami Hurricanes football

Fiesta Bowl, L 10–14 vs. Penn State
- Conference: Independent

Ranking
- Coaches: No. 2
- AP: No. 2
- Record: 11–1
- Head coach: Jimmy Johnson (3rd season)
- Offensive coordinator: Gary Stevens (4th season)
- Offensive scheme: Pro-style
- Defensive coordinator: Dave Wannstedt (1st season)
- Base defense: 4–3
- MVP: Vinny Testaverde
- Home stadium: Miami Orange Bowl

1986 NCAA Division I-A independents football records
	Conf.					Overall
Team	W		L		T	W		L		T
No. 1 Penn State		–		–		12	–	0	–	0
No. 2 Miami (FL)		–		–		11	–	1	–	0
No. 20 Virginia Tech		–		–		9	–	2	–	1
No. 19 Boston College		–		–		9	–	3	–	0
Tulsa		–		–		7	–	4	–	0
Florida State		–		–		7	–	4	–	1
Army		–		–		6	–	5	–	0
Southwestern Louisiana		–		–		6	–	5	–	0
Southern Miss		–		–		6	–	5	–	0
Temple		–		–		6	–	5	–	0
Pittsburgh		–		–		5	–	5	–	1
Rutgers		–		–		5	–	5	–	1
Cincinnati		–		–		5	–	6	–	0
Notre Dame		–		–		5	–	6	–	0
Syracuse		–		–		5	–	6	–	0
South Carolina		–		–		3	–	6	–	2
Tulane		–		–		4	–	7	–	0
West Virginia		–		–		4	–	7	–	0
Louisville		–		–		3	–	8	–	0
Navy		–		–		3	–	8	–	0
Wichita State		–		–		3	–	8	–	0
East Carolina		–		–		2	–	9	–	0
Northern Illinois		–		–		2	–	9	–	0
Memphis State		–		–		1	–	10	–	0
Rankings from AP Poll

The 1986 Miami Hurricanes football team represented the University of Miami as an independent during the 1986 NCAA Division I-A football season. It was the Hurricanes' 61st season of football. The Hurricanes were led by third year head coach Jimmy Johnson and played home games at the Miami Orange Bowl in Miami. Miami outscored their opponents 420–136, including a 28–16 victory against the Oklahoma Sooners, who were the defending national champions and ranked No. 1 at the time. At 11–0, it was Miami's first undefeated regular season, which they finished ranked No. 1. They were invited to the Fiesta Bowl. Miami lost, 14–10, to No. 2 Penn State, also undefeated.

== Schedule ==
Date	Opponent	Rank	Site	TV	Result	Attendance	Source
August 30	at South Carolina	No. 3	Williams–Brice Stadium; Columbia, SC	ESPN	W 34–14	73,500	
September 6	at No. 13 Florida	No. 3	Florida Field; Gainesville, FL (rivalry)		W 23–15	74,875	
September 13	Texas Tech	No. 2	Orange Bowl Stadium; Miami, FL	KJTV	W 61–11	41,925	
September 27	No. 1 Oklahoma	No. 2	Orange Bowl Stadium; Miami, FL	CBS	W 28–16	71,451	
October 4	Northern Illinois	No. 1	Orange Bowl Stadium; Miami, FL		W 34–0	33,905	
October 11	at West Virginia	No. 1	Mountaineer Field; Morgantown, WV	ABC	W 58–14	63,500	
October 18	at Cincinnati	No. 1	Nippert Stadium; Cincinnati, OH	Raycom	W 45–13	29,546	
November 1	No. 20 Florida State^{†}	No. 1	Orange Bowl Stadium; Miami, FL (rivalry)	CBS	W 41–23	62,834	
November 8	at Pittsburgh	No. 1	Pitt Stadium; Pittsburgh, PA	ABC	W 37–10	55,338	
November 15	Tulsa	No. 1	Orange Bowl Stadium; Miami, FL		W 23–10	51,110	
November 27	East Carolina	No. 1	Orange Bowl Stadium; Miami, FL		W 36–10	30,202	
January 2	vs. No. 2 Penn State	No. 1	Sun Devil Stadium; Tempe, AZ (Fiesta Bowl)	NBC	L 10–14	73,098	
^{†}Homecoming; Rankings from AP Poll released prior to the game; Source:

== Personnel ==
1986 Miami Hurricanes football team roster
Players
Coaches
Offense

Pos.	#	Name	Class
G	73	David Alekna	Sr
OT	56	Chris Bell	Fr
WR	9	Brian Blades	Jr
RB	5	Melvin Bratton	Jr
WR	83	Andre Brown	So
OT	53	Rob Canei	Jr
TE	84	Rob Chudzinski	Fr
OL	59	Luis Cristabol	Fr
OT	70	Ed Davis	Sr
C	50	Bobby Garcia	Fr
FB	26	Cleveland Gary	So
FB	41	Eric Ham	Jr
TE	82	Charles Henry	Jr
FB	30	Alonzo Highsmith	Sr
WR	17	Rodney Hill	So
C	64	Roderick Holder	Fr
TE	80	John Hunt	Fr
WR	47	Michael Irvin	So
QB	8	Greg Jones	Fr
OT	72	Marcus Kinlaw	Fr
Sr	11	David Kintigh	Sr
G	61	Maurice Maddox	Jr
OL	52	Jose Montalvo	So
G	77	Paul O'Connor	Sr
OT	37	Darryl Oliver	Sr
FB	75	John O'Neill	So
G	68	Barry Panfil	Fr
OT	71	Matt Patchan	Jr
RB	21	J.C. Penny	Jr
WR	33	Brett Perrriman	Jr
OT	69	Mike Pigza	So
G	76	Scott Provin	Jr
C	74	Gregg Rakoczy	Sr
TE	87	Alfredo Roberts	Jr
G	65	Steve Rosinski	Fr
OT	78	Bill Schaefer
TE	81	Brian Smith	So
RB	44	Steve Staffier	Jr
OL	67	Mike Sullivan	Fr
QB	14	Vinny Testaverde	Sr
RB	16	Robert Thomas	So
QB	13	Geoff Torretta	Sr
QB	7	Bill Turkowski	Fr
FB	34	Tracy Waiters	So
QB	1	Steve Walsh	Fr
RB	24	Warren Williams	Jr
WR	23	Percy Wilson	Fr

Defense

Pos.	#	Name	Class
CB	18	Tolbert Bain	Jr
DB	6	Kenny Berry	Fr
S	36	Bennie Blades	Jr
DT	98	Jerome Brown	Sr
S	32	Selwyn Brown	Jr
LB	91	Rod Carter	So
LB	57	Bernard Clark	Fr
DB	29	Don Ellis	So
CB	19	Darrell Fullington	Jr
DL	60	David Guest	Fr
DL	49	Darren Handy	Fr
DB	39	Bobby Harden	Fr
LB	85	Kevin Harris	Fr
DE	54	Bill Hawkins	So
DB	15	Jason Hicks	Fr
LB	31	Freddy Highsmith	So
DE	99	Jeff Howard	Fr
LB	40	Sandy Jack	Fr
DB	27	Michael Johnson	Fr
DT	86	Derwin Jones	Jr
DE	63	Jimmie Jones	Fr
LB	51	Bukasa Kalombo	Fr
DE	88	Dennis Kelleher	Fr
DT	62	Gary Mahon	So
LB	55	Danny Mariscal	So
DE	94	Greg Mark	Fr
DL	79	Russell Maryland	Fr
DB	28	Kevin McCutcheon	Sr
DB	48	Bubba McDowell	So
CB	43	Doug McFadden	Sr
LB	45	George Mira Jr.	Jr
LB	90	Victor Morris	Sr
LB	92	Winston Moss	Sr
DT	97	Ernie Parish	So
LB	58	Willis Peguese	Fr
S	2	Basil Proctor	Fr
LB	22	Randy Shannon	So
DT	93	Dan Sileo	Jr
CB	35	Tim Sims	Sr
DE	96	Dan Stubbs	Jr
DT	95	Brad Stunkel	Fr

Special teams

Pos.	#	Name	Class
K	25	Greg Cox	Jr
P	38	Jeff Feagles	Jr
P	20	Steve Kazdin	Sr
P	12	Kirk Sandifer	So
K	3	Mark Seelig	Sr
P	17	David Lewis	Jr

Head coach

- Jimmy Johnson

Coordinators/assistant coaches

- Hubbard Alexander (WR)
- Joe Brodsky (RB)
- Butch Davis (DL)
- Bill Foran (Str+Cond)
- John Fontes (Volunteer)
- Steve Hoffman (GA)
- Art Kehoe (OL)
- Carlos Mainord (DB)
- Ron Meeks (GA)
- Chuck Pagano (GA)
- Stewart Rogers (GA)
- Don Soldinger (TE)
- Gary Stevens (OC/QB)
- Tommy Tuberville (GA)
- Dave Wannstedt (DC/LB)
- Tony Wise (OL)

Legend

- (C) Team captain
- (S) Suspended
- (I) Ineligible
- Injured
- Redshirt

Roster
Last update: 2016-10-05

== Season summary ==
=== At South Carolina ===
Miami (FL) at South Carolina

Team	1	2	3	4	Total
• No. 3 Hurricanes	14	3	17	0	34
Gamecocks	0	0	0	14	14

- Date: August 30
- Location: Williams–Brice Stadium

Scoring summary
Q1	MIA	Bratton 34-yard run (Seelig kick)	MIA 7–0
Q1	MIA	Bratton 12-yard run (Seelig kick)	MIA 14–0
Q2	MIA	Seelig 45-yard field goal	MIA 17–0
Q3	MIA	Bratton 2-yard run (Seelig kick)	MIA 24–0
Q3	MIA	Seelig 49-yard field goal	MIA 27–0
Q3	MIA	A. Highsmith 17-yard pass from Testaverde (Seelig kick)	MIA 34–0
Q4	SCAR	H. Brown 4-yard pass from Ellis (Hagler kick)	MIA 34–7
Q4	SCAR	Sharpe 29-yard pass from Ellis (Hagler kick)	MIA 34–14

- Melvin Bratton 10 Rush, 105 Yds
- Michael Irvin 6 Rec, 101 Yds

=== At Florida ===
Miami (FL)

Team	1	2	3	4	Total
• No. 3 Hurricanes	7	0	9	7	23
Gators	0	9	0	6	15

- Date: September 6
- Location: Florida Field

Scoring summary
Q1	MIA	Bratton 24-yard run (Seelig kick)	MIA 7–0
Q2	FLA	Dawson 32-yard field goal	MIA 7–3
Q2	FLA	Dawson 38-yard field goal	MIA 7–6
Q2	FLA	Dawson 41-yard field goal	FLA 9–7
Q3	MIA	Bratton 20-yard run (pass failed)	MIA 13–9
Q3	MIA	Seelig 35-yard field goal	MIA 16–9
Q4	MIA	Irvin 15-yard pass from Testaverde (Seelig kick)	MIA 23–9
Q4	FLA	Jones 1-yard pass from Bell (pass failed)	MIA 23–15

=== Oklahoma ===
Oklahoma at Miami (FL)

Team	1	2	3	4	Total
No. 1 Sooners	0	3	7	6	16
• No. 2 Hurricanes	0	7	21	0	28

- Date: September 27
- Location: Orange Bowl
- Game start: 3:30 p.m. EDT
- Referee: J.C. Louderback
- TV announcers (CBS): Brent Musburger and Ara Parseghian

=== Florida State ===
Florida State at Miami (FL)

Team	1	2	3	4	Total
No. 20 Seminoles	14	3	6	0	23
• No. 1 Hurricanes	14	0	7	20	41

- Date: November 1
- Location: Orange Bowl
- Game start: 12:00 p.m. EST
- Game attendance: 62,834
- TV announcers (CBS): Brent Musburger and Ara Parseghian

=== Vs. Penn State (Fiesta Bowl) ===
Miami (FL) vs. Penn State

Team	1	2	3	4	Total
No. 1 Hurricanes	0	7	0	3	10
• No. 2 Nittany Lions	0	7	0	7	14

- Date: January 2
- Location: Sun Devil Stadium, Tempe, AZ
- Game attendance: 73,098
- Referee: Jimmy Harper
- TV announcers (NBC): Charlie Jones, Bob Griese, and Jimmy Cefalo

== 1987 NFL draft ==
Player	Position	Round	Pick	NFL club
Vinny Testaverde	Quarterback	1	1	Tampa Bay Buccaneers
Alonzo Highsmith	Running back	1	3	Houston Oilers
Jerome Brown	Defensive tackle	1	9	Philadelphia Eagles
Gregg Rakoczy	Center	2	32	Cleveland Browns
Winston Moss	Linebacker	2	50	Tampa Bay Buccaneers
Paul O'Connor	Guard	5	140	New York Giants
Darryl Oliver	Running back	11	297	Seattle Seahawks
