= 1986 All-South Independent football team =

American college football season

The 1986 All-South Independent football team consists of American football players chosen by the Associated Press for their All-South independent teams for the 1986 NCAA Division I-A football season.

== Offense ==
=== Quarterbacks ===
- Vinny Testaverde, Miami (AP-1)
- Todd Ellis, South Carolina (AP-2)

=== Running backs ===
- Alonzo Highsmith, Miami (AP-1)
- Maurice Williams, Virginia Tech (AP-1)
- Eddie Hunter, Virginia Tech (AP-2)
- Vincent Alexander, Southern Miss (AP-2)
- Melvin Bratton, Miami (AP-2)

=== Wide receivers ===
- Marc Zeno, Tulane (AP-1)
- Michael Irvin, Miami (AP-1)
- Sterling Sharpe, South Carolina (AP-1)
- Wayne Snell, Virginia Tech (AP-2)
- Herb Gainer, Florida State (AP-2)

=== Tight ends ===
- Pat Carter, Florida State (AP-1)
- Steve Johnson, Virginia Tech (AP-2)

=== Offensive tackles ===
- Pat Tomberlin, Florida State (AP-1)
- Bruce Armstrong, Miami (AP-1)
- Tim Calcagno, Louisiana-Lafayette (AP-2)
- Andre Lockley, Tulane (AP-2)

=== Offensive guards ===
- Paul O’Connor, Miami (AP-1)
- Pat Ferrell, Southern Miss (AP-1)
- Kevin Keefe, Virginia (AP-2)
- Mark Fryer, South Carolina (AP-2)

=== Centers ===
- Gregg Rakoczy, Miami (AP-1)
- Ted Gatewood, Memphis (AP-2)

== Defense ==
=== Defensive ends ===
- Dan Stubbs, Miami (AP-1)
- Curtis Taliaferro, Virginia Tech (AP-1)
- Morgan Roane, Virginia Tech (AP-2)
- David Brandon, Memphis (AP-2)

=== Defensive tackles ===
- Jerome Brown, Miami (AP-1)
- Gerald Nichols, Florida State (AP-1)
- Dan Sileo, Miami (AP-2)
- Chris Thieneman, Louisville (AP-2)

=== Linebackers ===
- Paul McGowan, Florida State (AP-1)
- George Mira Jr., Miami (AP-1)
- Fred Jones, Florida State (AP-2)
- Paul Nelson, Virginia Tech (AP-2)
- Winston Moss, Miami (AP-2)
- Derrick Little, South Carolina (AP-2)

=== Defensive backs ===
- Bennie Blades, Miami (AP-1)
- Deion Sanders, Florida State (AP-1)
- Greg Philpot, South Carolina (AP-1)
- Thurston Harrison, Tulane (AP-2)
- Elton Slater, Louisiana-Lafayette (AP-2)
- Carter Wiley, Virginia Tech (AP-2)

== Special teams ==
=== Kickers ===
- Chris Kinzer, Virginia Tech (AP-1)
- Derek Schmidt, Florida State (AP-2)

=== Punters ===
- Louis Berry, Florida State (AP-1)
- Billy Knighten, Southern Miss (AP-2)
