= 1986 Florida State Seminoles football team =

American college football season

1986 Florida State Seminoles football

All American Bowl champion

All American Bowl, W 27–13 vs. Indiana
- Conference: Independent

Ranking
- Coaches: No. 20
- Record: 7–4–1
- Head coach: Bobby Bowden (11th season)
- Offensive coordinator: Wayne McDuffie (4th season)
- Offensive scheme: No-huddle spread
- Defensive coordinator: Mickey Andrews (3rd season)
- Base defense: 4–3
- Captains: Fred Jones; Gerald Nichols; Louis Berry; Jim Hendley
- Home stadium: Doak Campbell Stadium

1986 NCAA Division I-A independents football records
	Conf.					Overall
Team	W		L		T	W		L		T
No. 1 Penn State		–		–		12	–	0	–	0
No. 2 Miami (FL)		–		–		11	–	1	–	0
No. 20 Virginia Tech		–		–		9	–	2	–	1
No. 19 Boston College		–		–		9	–	3	–	0
Tulsa		–		–		7	–	4	–	0
Florida State		–		–		7	–	4	–	1
Army		–		–		6	–	5	–	0
Southwestern Louisiana		–		–		6	–	5	–	0
Southern Miss		–		–		6	–	5	–	0
Temple		–		–		6	–	5	–	0
Pittsburgh		–		–		5	–	5	–	1
Rutgers		–		–		5	–	5	–	1
Cincinnati		–		–		5	–	6	–	0
Notre Dame		–		–		5	–	6	–	0
Syracuse		–		–		5	–	6	–	0
South Carolina		–		–		3	–	6	–	2
Tulane		–		–		4	–	7	–	0
West Virginia		–		–		4	–	7	–	0
Louisville		–		–		3	–	8	–	0
Navy		–		–		3	–	8	–	0
Wichita State		–		–		3	–	8	–	0
East Carolina		–		–		2	–	9	–	0
Northern Illinois		–		–		2	–	9	–	0
Memphis State		–		–		1	–	10	–	0
Rankings from AP Poll

The 1986 Florida State Seminoles football team represented Florida State University as an independent during the 1986 NCAA Division I-A football season. Led by 11th-year head coach Bobby Bowden, the Seminoles compiled a record of 7–4–1 with a win in the All American Bowl over Indiana. Florida State played home games at Doak Campbell Stadium in Tallahassee, Florida.

== Schedule ==
Date	Time	Opponent	Rank	Site	TV	Result	Attendance	Source
August 30	7:00 p.m.	Toledo	No. 11	Doak Campbell Stadium; Tallahassee, FL		W 24–0	53,891	
September 6	8:00 p.m.	at No. 8 Nebraska	No. 11	Memorial Stadium; Lincoln, NE	ABC	L 17–34	75,865	
September 20	12:30 p.m.	North Carolina	No. 15	Doak Campbell Stadium; Tallahassee, FL	TBS	T 10–10	57,611	
September 27	12:30 p.m.	at No. 5 Michigan	No. 20	Michigan Stadium; Ann Arbor, MI	TBS	L 18–20	105,578	
October 11	7:00 p.m.	Tulane		Doak Campbell Stadium; Tallahassee, FL		W 54–21	53,701	
October 18	7:00 p.m.	Wichita State		Doak Campbell Stadium; Tallahassee, FL		W 59–3	56,222	
October 25	7:00 p.m.	at Louisville		Cardinal Stadium; Louisville, KY		W 54–18	22,822	
November 1	12:00 p.m.	at No. 1 Miami (FL)	No. 20	Miami Orange Bowl; Miami, FL (rivalry)	CBS	L 23–41	62,834	
November 8	1:30 p.m.	at South Carolina		Williams–Brice Stadium; Columbia, SC		W 45–28	71,689	
November 15	3:00 p.m.	Southern Miss^{†}		Doak Campbell Stadium; Tallahassee, FL		W 49–13	60,103	
November 29	7:00 p.m.	Florida		Doak Campbell Stadium; Tallahassee, FL (rivalry)		L 13–17	62,370	
December 31	3:00 p.m.	vs. Indiana		Legion Field; Birmingham, AL (All-American Bowl)	WTBS	W 27–13	30,000	
^{†}Homecoming; Rankings from AP Poll released prior to the game

== Game summaries ==
=== Toledo ===
Team	1	2	3	4	Total
Toledo	0	0	0	0	0
• Florida St	3	0	14	7	24

- Date: August 30
- Location: Doak Campbell Stadium
- Game attendance: 53,891

=== Nebraska ===
Team	1	2	3	4	Total
Florida St	7	7	3	0	17
• Nebraska	0	10	14	10	34

- Date: September 6
- Location: Memorial Stadium

=== North Carolina ===
Team	1	2	3	4	Total
North Carolina	7	0	0	3	10
Florida St	0	0	10	0	10

- Date: September 20
- Location: Doak Campbell Stadium

=== At Michigan ===
Team	1	2	3	4	Total
Florida St	3	7	0	8	18
• Michigan	7	3	3	7	20

- Date: September 27
- Location: Michigan Stadium

=== Tulane ===
Team	1	2	3	4	Total
Tulane	0	6	8	7	21
• Florida St	0	14	14	26	54

- Date: October 11
- Location: Doak Campbell Stadium
- Game attendance: 53,701

=== Wichita St ===
Team	1	2	3	4	Total
Wichita St	0	0	0	3	3
• Florida St	14	24	14	7	59

- Date: October 18
- Location: Doak Campbell Stadium

=== At Louisville ===
Team	1	2	3	4	Total
• Florida St	7	30	10	7	54
Louisville	10	8	0	0	18

- Date: October 25
- Location: Cardinal Stadium

=== At Miami (FL) ===
Team	1	2	3	4	Total
Florida St	14	3	6	0	23
• Miami (FL)	14	0	7	20	41

- Date: November 1
- Location: Orange Bowl
- Game attendance: 62,834
- Game weather: Sunny, 85 °F (29 °C)
- Referee: Tommy Miller

Scoring summary

Quarter	Time	Drive			Team	Scoring information	Score	
Quarter	Time	Plays	Yards	TOP	Team	Scoring information	FSU	UM
1	12:17	9	80	2:43	FSU	Tanner Holloman 6-yard touchdown run, Derek Schmidt kick good	7	0
1	8:48	11	75	3:29	UM	Warren Williams 4-yard touchdown run, Greg Cox kick good	7	7
1	2:04	3	23	1:00	UM	Alonzo Highsmith 23-yard touchdown reception from Vinny Testaverde, Greg Cox kick good	7	14
1	1:47				FSU	Dexter Carter lateral pass from Keith Ross for 100-yard kickoff return for touchdown, Derek Schmidt kick good	14	14
2	11:03	8	20	3:19	FSU	36-yard field goal by Derek Schmidt	17	14
2	5:20	4	–5	2:14	FSU	38-yard field goal by Derek Schmidt	20	14
3	10:18	11	76	4:42	UM	Vinny Testaverde 8-yard touchdown run, Greg Cox kick good	20	21
3	0:43	7	8	3:41	FSU	45-yard field goal by Derek Schmidt	23	21
4	12:24	8	85	3:19	UM	Brian Blades 20-yard touchdown reception from Vinny Testaverde, 2-point pass incomplete	23	27
4	5:20	10	93	5:24	UM	Vinny Testaverde 1-yard touchdown run, Greg Cox kick good	23	34
4	1:27	5	40	2:25	UM	Brett Perriman 24-yard touchdown reception from Vinny Testaverde, Greg Cox kick good	23	41
"TOP" = time of possession. For other American football terms, see Glossary of American football.							23	41

=== At South Carolina ===
Team	1	2	3	4	Total
• Florida St	3	10	29	3	45
South Carolina	7	14	0	7	28

- Date: November 8
- Location: Williams–Brice Stadium
- Game attendance: 71,689

=== Southern Miss ===
Team	1	2	3	4	Total
Southern Miss	0	0	13	0	13
• Florida St	7	21	14	7	49

- Date: November 15
- Location: Doak Campbell Stadium

Homecoming

=== Florida ===
Team	1	2	3	4	Total
• Florida	7	3	0	7	17
Florida St	3	7	3	0	13

- Date: November 29
- Location: Doak Campbell Stadium
- Game attendance: 61,303
- Game weather: Rain

=== Vs. Indiana—All-American Bowl ===
Indiana vs. Florida State

Team	1	2	3	4	Total
Hoosiers	3	0	7	3	13
• Seminoles	6	7	7	7	27

- Date: December 31
- Location: Legion Field
