= 1986 Rutgers Scarlet Knights football team =

American college football season

1986 Rutgers Scarlet Knights football
- Conference: Independent
- Record: 5–5–1
- Head coach: Dick Anderson (3rd season)
- Offensive coordinator: Dick Curl (4th season)
- Defensive coordinator: Otto Kneidinger (2rd season)
- Home stadium: Rutgers Stadium; Giants Stadium

1986 Major eastern college football independents records
	Conf.					Overall
Team	W		L		T	W		L		T
No. 1 Penn State $	6	–	0	–	0	12	–	0	–	0
No. 19 Boston College	3	–	2	–	0	9	–	3	–	0
Syracuse	3	–	3	–	0	5	–	6	–	0
Temple	2	–	3	–	0	6	–	5	–	0
Pittsburgh	2	–	3	–	0	5	–	5	–	1
Rutgers	2	–	4	–	0	5	–	5	–	1
West Virginia	1	–	4	–	0	4	–	7	–	0
$ – Lambert Trophy Winner; Rankings from AP Poll

1986 NCAA Division I-A independents football records
	Conf.					Overall
Team	W		L		T	W		L		T
No. 1 Penn State		–		–		12	–	0	–	0
No. 2 Miami (FL)		–		–		11	–	1	–	0
No. 20 Virginia Tech		–		–		9	–	2	–	1
No. 19 Boston College		–		–		9	–	3	–	0
Tulsa		–		–		7	–	4	–	0
Florida State		–		–		7	–	4	–	1
Army		–		–		6	–	5	–	0
Southwestern Louisiana		–		–		6	–	5	–	0
Southern Miss		–		–		6	–	5	–	0
Temple		–		–		6	–	5	–	0
Pittsburgh		–		–		5	–	5	–	1
Rutgers		–		–		5	–	5	–	1
Cincinnati		–		–		5	–	6	–	0
Notre Dame		–		–		5	–	6	–	0
Syracuse		–		–		5	–	6	–	0
South Carolina		–		–		3	–	6	–	2
Tulane		–		–		4	–	7	–	0
West Virginia		–		–		4	–	7	–	0
Louisville		–		–		3	–	8	–	0
Navy		–		–		3	–	8	–	0
Wichita State		–		–		3	–	8	–	0
East Carolina		–		–		2	–	9	–	0
Northern Illinois		–		–		2	–	9	–	0
Memphis State		–		–		1	–	10	–	0
Rankings from AP Poll

The 1986 Rutgers Scarlet Knights football team represented Rutgers University as an independent during the 1986 NCAA Division I-A football season. In their third season under head coach Dick Anderson, the Scarlet Knights compiled a 5–5–1 record while competing as an independent and outscored their opponents 221 to 189. The team's statistical leaders included Scott Erney with 1,160 passing yards, Matt Prescott with 606 rushing yards, and Brian Cobb with 368s receiving yards.

== Schedule ==
Date	Opponent	Site	Result	Attendance	Source
September 6	at Boston College	Alumni Stadium; Chestnut Hill, MA	W 11–9	30,000	
September 13	at Kentucky	Commonwealth Stadium; Lexington, KY	T 16–16	57,424	
September 20	Cincinnati	Rutgers Stadium; Piscataway, NJ	W 48–28	27,249	
September 27	at Syracuse	Carrier Dome; Syracuse, NY	W 16–10	33,577	
October 4	at No. 5 Penn State	Beaver Stadium; University Park, PA	L 6–31	84,000	
October 18	Florida	Giants Stadium; East Rutherford, NJ	L 3–15	36,781	
October 25	Army	Giants Stadium; East Rutherford, NJ	W 35–7	31,623	
November 1	at Louisville	Cardinal Stadium; Louisville, KY	W 41–0	20,165	
November 8	West Virginia	Giants Stadium; East Rutherford, NJ	L 17–24	15,101	
November 15	at Pittsburgh	Pitt Stadium; Pittsburgh, PA	L 6–20	34,922	
November 22	Temple	Rutgers Stadium; Piscataway, NJ	L 22–29	24,386	
Rankings from AP Poll released prior to the game
