= 1986 Tulane Green Wave football team =

American college football season

1986 Tulane Green Wave football
- Conference: Independent
- Record: 4–7
- Head coach: Mack Brown (2nd season)
- Offensive coordinator: Darrell Moody (2nd season)
- Home stadium: Louisiana Superdome

1986 NCAA Division I-A independents football records
	Conf.					Overall
Team	W		L		T	W		L		T
No. 1 Penn State		–		–		12	–	0	–	0
No. 2 Miami (FL)		–		–		11	–	1	–	0
No. 20 Virginia Tech		–		–		9	–	2	–	1
No. 19 Boston College		–		–		9	–	3	–	0
Tulsa		–		–		7	–	4	–	0
Florida State		–		–		7	–	4	–	1
Army		–		–		6	–	5	–	0
Southwestern Louisiana		–		–		6	–	5	–	0
Southern Miss		–		–		6	–	5	–	0
Temple		–		–		6	–	5	–	0
Pittsburgh		–		–		5	–	5	–	1
Rutgers		–		–		5	–	5	–	1
Cincinnati		–		–		5	–	6	–	0
Notre Dame		–		–		5	–	6	–	0
Syracuse		–		–		5	–	6	–	0
South Carolina		–		–		3	–	6	–	2
Tulane		–		–		4	–	7	–	0
West Virginia		–		–		4	–	7	–	0
Louisville		–		–		3	–	8	–	0
Navy		–		–		3	–	8	–	0
Wichita State		–		–		3	–	8	–	0
East Carolina		–		–		2	–	9	–	0
Northern Illinois		–		–		2	–	9	–	0
Memphis State		–		–		1	–	10	–	0
Rankings from AP Poll

The 1986 Tulane Green Wave football team was an American football team that represented Tulane University during the 1986 NCAA Division I-A football season as an independent. In their second year under head coach Mack Brown, the team compiled a 4–7 record.

== Schedule ==
Date	Opponent	Site	TV	Result	Attendance	Source
September 13	TCU	Louisiana Superdome; New Orleans, LA		L 31–48	34,187	
September 20	at Vanderbilt	Vanderbilt Stadium; Nashville, TN		W 35–17	40,155	
September 27	at Ole Miss	Vaught–Hemingway Stadium; Oxford, MS (rivalry)		L 10–25	25,000	
October 4	Wichita State	Louisiana Superdome; New Orleans, LA		L 20–21	24,481	
October 11	at Florida State	Doak Campbell Stadium; Tallahassee, FL		L 21–54	53,701	
October 18	No. 13 Mississippi State	Louisiana Superdome; New Orleans, LA		L 27–34	47,263	
October 25	Southern Miss	Louisiana Superdome; New Orleans, LA (rivalry)		W 35–20	28,417	
November 1	Southwestern Louisiana	Louisiana Superdome; New Orleans, LA		W 42–39	44,132	
November 8	Louisville	Louisiana Superdome; New Orleans, LA		L 12–23	22,108	
November 15	Memphis State	Louisiana Superdome; New Orleans, LA		W 15–6	23,614	
November 29	at No. 5 LSU	Tiger Stadium; Baton Rouge, LA (Battle for the Rag)	TigerVision	L 17–37	78,131	
Rankings from AP Poll released prior to the game

== Roster ==
1986 Tulane Green Wave football team roster
Players
Coaches
Offense

Pos.	#	Name	Class
RB	34	Marvin Allen	Jr
QB	10	Terrence Jones	So
WR	21	Maurice Nelson	So
WR	11	Marc Zeno	Jr

Defense

Pos.	#	Name	Class
DT	99	Tony Hannah	Sr
LB	95	Richard Harvey	So

Special teams

Pos.	#	Name	Class
Safety	35	Michael Arata	Fr

Head coach

- Mack Brown

Coordinators/assistant coaches

Legend

- (C) Team captain
- (S) Suspended
- (I) Ineligible
- Injured
- Redshirt
