= 1986 Army Cadets football team =

American college football season

1986 Army Cadets football
- Conference: Independent
- Record: 6–5
- Head coach: Jim Young (4th season)
- Offensive scheme: Triple option
- Defensive coordinator: Bob Sutton (4th season)
- Base defense: 4–3
- Captains: Jim Brock; Rob Dickerson
- Home stadium: Michie Stadium

1986 NCAA Division I-A independents football records
	Conf.					Overall
Team	W		L		T	W		L		T
No. 1 Penn State		–		–		12	–	0	–	0
No. 2 Miami (FL)		–		–		11	–	1	–	0
No. 20 Virginia Tech		–		–		9	–	2	–	1
No. 19 Boston College		–		–		9	–	3	–	0
Tulsa		–		–		7	–	4	–	0
Florida State		–		–		7	–	4	–	1
Army		–		–		6	–	5	–	0
Southwestern Louisiana		–		–		6	–	5	–	0
Southern Miss		–		–		6	–	5	–	0
Temple		–		–		6	–	5	–	0
Pittsburgh		–		–		5	–	5	–	1
Rutgers		–		–		5	–	5	–	1
Cincinnati		–		–		5	–	6	–	0
Notre Dame		–		–		5	–	6	–	0
Syracuse		–		–		5	–	6	–	0
South Carolina		–		–		3	–	6	–	2
Tulane		–		–		4	–	7	–	0
West Virginia		–		–		4	–	7	–	0
Louisville		–		–		3	–	8	–	0
Navy		–		–		3	–	8	–	0
Wichita State		–		–		3	–	8	–	0
East Carolina		–		–		2	–	9	–	0
Northern Illinois		–		–		2	–	9	–	0
Memphis State		–		–		1	–	10	–	0
Rankings from AP Poll

The 1986 Army Cadets football team was an American football team that represented the United States Military Academy as an independent during the 1986 NCAA Division I-A football season. In their fourth season under head coach Jim Young, the Cadets compiled a 6–5 record and were outscored by their opponents by a combined total of 292 to 276. In the annual Army–Navy Game, the Cadets defeated Navy, 27–7.

== Schedule ==
Date	Opponent	Site	Result	Attendance	Source
September 13	Syracuse	Michie Stadium; West Point, NY	W 33–28	38,822	
September 20	at Northwestern	Dyche Stadium; Evanston, IL	L 18–25	31,123	
September 27	Wake Forest	Michie Stadium; West Point, NY	L 14–49	40,853	
October 4	at Yale	Yale Bowl; New Haven, CT	W 41–24	25,075	
October 11	at Tennessee	Neyland Stadium; Knoxville, TN	W 25–21	91,343	
October 18	Holy Cross	Michie Stadium; West Point, NY	L 14–17	40,884	
October 25	vs. Rutgers	Giants Stadium; East Rutherford, NJ	L 7–35	31,623	
November 1	Boston College	Michie Stadium; West Point, NY	L 20–27	40,315	
November 8	Air Force	Michie Stadium; West Point, NY (Commander-in-Chief's Trophy)	W 21–11	35,217	
November 15	Lafayette	Michie Stadium; West Point, NY	W 56–48	40,088	
December 6	vs. Navy	Veterans Stadium; Philadelphia, PA (Army–Navy Game)	W 27–7	71,570	

== Game summaries ==
=== Syracuse ===
External videos
- Army highlights vs. Syracuse

=== At Tennessee ===
Army Cadets at Tennessee Volunteers

Quarter	1	2	3	4	Total
Army	0	7	0	18	25
Tennessee	0	14	7	0	21

at Neyland Stadium • Knoxville, Tennessee

- Date: October 11
- Game attendance: 91,343

Game information
- TENN - Howard 6 yard run (Reveiz kick)
- TENN - Howard 4 yard run (Reveiz kick)
- ARMY - Jones 1 yard run (Rambusch kick)
- TENN - Howard 1 yard run (Reveiz kick)
- ARMY - Rambusch 27 yard field goal
- ARMY - Jones 1 yard run (run good)
- ARMY - Fullwood 2 yard blocked punt return (Rambusch kick)

Army

- Crawford 4/7, 34 Yds, 2 INT
  25 Rush, 112 Yds
- Jones 3 Rec, 26 Yds

Tennessee

- Francis 24/33, 334 Yds, INT
- Howard 17 Rush, 47 Yds, 3 TD
- Cleveland 3 Rec, 90 Yds

=== Lafayette ===
Lafayette Leopards (5–4) at Army Cadets (4–5)

Quarter	1	2	Total
Lafayette	21	27	48
Army	28	28	56

at Michie Stadium, West Point, New York

- Date: November 16, 1986
- Game attendance: 40,088

=== vs Navy ===
Army Cadets vs. Navy Midshipmen

Quarter	1	2	3	4	Total
Army	3	3	7	14	27
Navy	0	0	7	0	7

at Veterans Stadium • Philadelphia, Pennsylvania

- Date: December 6
- Game attendance: 71,570
- TV announcers: Brent Musburger and Ara Parseghian

Game information

Army

- Tory Crawford
  3/4, 53 Yds
  23 Rush, 94 Yds, TD
- Ben White
  2 Rec, 31 Yds

Navy

- Bob Misch
  8/15, 93 Yds, INT
- Don Holl
  17 Rush, 88 Yds, TD
  4 Rec, 42 Yds

The entire game was played without a single penalty being committed by either team.

Scoring summary

Quarter	Time	Drive			Team	Scoring information	Score	
Quarter	Time	Plays	Yards	TOP	Team	Scoring information	ARMY	NAVY
1					Army	24-yard field goal by Keith Walker	3	0
2					Army	24-yard field goal by Keith Walker	6	0
3		6			Army	Andy Peterson 1-yard touchdown run, Keith Walker kick good	13	0
3					Navy	Don Holl 3-yard touchdown run, Ted Fundoukas kick good	13	7
4			79		Army	Tory Crawford 1-yard touchdown run, Keith Walker kick good	20	7
4					Army	Clarence Jones 5-yard touchdown run, Keith Walker kick good	27	7
"TOP" = time of possession. For other American football terms, see Glossary of American football.							27	7

== Roster ==
1986 Army Cadets football team roster
Players
Coaches
Offense

Pos.	#	Name	Class
TE	86	Mark Charette
QB	9	Tory Crawford	Jr
G		Dave D'Antonio	So
OL	77	Rob Dickerson
QB		Alan Edwards
G		Bill Gebhards
OL	68	Ken Goodlow
HB	40	Clarence Jones	Sr
C	51	Joe Manausa
G	71	John Oleinik
FB	47	Andy Peterson	Jr
QB		Mike Ryan
RB		Paolo Smith
WR	6	Ben White
WR		Benny Wright	Sr

Defense

Pos.	#	Name	Class
DL	94	Jim Brock
DL	69	Dan Cooney
S		Rusty Haire
S	25	Bill Horton
DT		Gerry Kobyiski
DL	82	Mike Lover
DL		Bill Lynch
	76	Thomas Mathers
LB		Dave Scheyer
LB		Chuck Schretzman

Special teams

Pos.	#	Name	Class
P		Scott Rainey
K		Bit Rambusch
K	4	Keith Walker

Head coach

- Jim Young

Coordinators/assistant coaches

Legend

- (C) Team captain
- (S) Suspended
- (I) Ineligible
- Injured
- Redshirt
