= 1986 Memphis State Tigers football team =

American college football season

1986 Memphis State Tigers football
- Conference: Independent
- Record: 1–10
- Head coach: Charlie Bailey (1st season)
- Offensive coordinator: Buddy Geis (1st season)
- Defensive coordinator: Larry Coyer (1st season)
- Home stadium: Liberty Bowl Memorial Stadium

1986 NCAA Division I-A independents football records
	Conf.					Overall
Team	W		L		T	W		L		T
No. 1 Penn State		–		–		12	–	0	–	0
No. 2 Miami (FL)		–		–		11	–	1	–	0
No. 20 Virginia Tech		–		–		9	–	2	–	1
No. 19 Boston College		–		–		9	–	3	–	0
Tulsa		–		–		7	–	4	–	0
Florida State		–		–		7	–	4	–	1
Army		–		–		6	–	5	–	0
Southwestern Louisiana		–		–		6	–	5	–	0
Southern Miss		–		–		6	–	5	–	0
Temple		–		–		6	–	5	–	0
Pittsburgh		–		–		5	–	5	–	1
Rutgers		–		–		5	–	5	–	1
Cincinnati		–		–		5	–	6	–	0
Notre Dame		–		–		5	–	6	–	0
Syracuse		–		–		5	–	6	–	0
South Carolina		–		–		3	–	6	–	2
Tulane		–		–		4	–	7	–	0
West Virginia		–		–		4	–	7	–	0
Louisville		–		–		3	–	8	–	0
Navy		–		–		3	–	8	–	0
Wichita State		–		–		3	–	8	–	0
East Carolina		–		–		2	–	9	–	0
Northern Illinois		–		–		2	–	9	–	0
Memphis State		–		–		1	–	10	–	0
Rankings from AP Poll

The 1986 Memphis Tigers football team represented Memphis State University (now known as the University of Memphis) in the 1986 NCAA Division I-A football season. The team was led by head coach Charlie Bailey. The Tigers played their home games at the Liberty Bowl Memorial Stadium.

== Schedule ==
Date	Opponent	Site	Result	Attendance	Source
September 6	at Ole Miss	Mississippi Veterans Memorial Stadium; Jackson, MS (rivalry)	L 6–28	43,600	
September 13	Arkansas State	Liberty Bowl Memorial Stadium; Memphis, TN (Paint Bucket Bowl)	L 10–30	36,510	
September 20	Southwestern Louisiana	Liberty Bowl Memorial Stadium; Memphis, TN	L 10–26	22,944	
September 27	at Louisville	Cardinal Stadium; Louisville, KY (rivalry)	L 8–34	30,801	
October 4	Mississippi State^{†}	Liberty Bowl Memorial Stadium; Memphis, TN	L 17–34	35,148	
October 11	at No. 2 Alabama	Bryant–Denny Stadium; Tuscaloosa, AL	L 0–37	60,210	
October 18	at Southern Miss	M. M. Roberts Stadium; Hattiesburg, MS (Black and Blue Bowl)	L 9–14	25,352	
November 1	at Vanderbilt	Vanderbilt Stadium; Nashville, TN	W 22–21	35,672	
November 8	at Tennessee	Neyland Stadium; Knoxville, TN	L 3–33	89,815	
November 15	at Tulane	Louisiana Superdome; New Orleans, LA	L 6–15	23,614	
November 22	New Mexico	Liberty Bowl Memorial Stadium; Memphis, TN	L 13–20	16,330	
^{†}Homecoming; Rankings from AP Poll released prior to the game
