= 1986 South Carolina Gamecocks football team =

American college football season

1986 South Carolina Gamecocks football
- Conference: Independent
- Record: 3–6–2
- Head coach: Joe Morrison (4th season)
- Offensive scheme: Run N' Shoot
- Defensive coordinator: Tom Gadd (4th season)
- Home stadium: Williams–Brice Stadium

1986 NCAA Division I-A independents football records
	Conf.					Overall
Team	W		L		T	W		L		T
No. 1 Penn State		–		–		12	–	0	–	0
No. 2 Miami (FL)		–		–		11	–	1	–	0
No. 20 Virginia Tech		–		–		9	–	2	–	1
No. 19 Boston College		–		–		9	–	3	–	0
Tulsa		–		–		7	–	4	–	0
Florida State		–		–		7	–	4	–	1
Army		–		–		6	–	5	–	0
Southwestern Louisiana		–		–		6	–	5	–	0
Southern Miss		–		–		6	–	5	–	0
Temple		–		–		6	–	5	–	0
Pittsburgh		–		–		5	–	5	–	1
Rutgers		–		–		5	–	5	–	1
Cincinnati		–		–		5	–	6	–	0
Notre Dame		–		–		5	–	6	–	0
Syracuse		–		–		5	–	6	–	0
South Carolina		–		–		3	–	6	–	2
Tulane		–		–		4	–	7	–	0
West Virginia		–		–		4	–	7	–	0
Louisville		–		–		3	–	8	–	0
Navy		–		–		3	–	8	–	0
Wichita State		–		–		3	–	8	–	0
East Carolina		–		–		2	–	9	–	0
Northern Illinois		–		–		2	–	9	–	0
Memphis State		–		–		1	–	10	–	0
Rankings from AP Poll

The 1986 South Carolina Gamecocks football team represented the University of South Carolina as an independent during the 1986 NCAA Division I-A football season. The team played its home games at Williams–Brice Stadium. Led by fourth-year head coach Joe Morrison, the Gamecocks compiled a record of 3–6–2.

The Gamecocks' three wins were the fewest in two decades. However, South Carolina's "near misses" against Georgia, No. 3 Nebraska and No. 19 Clemson have been considered a preview to their stronger season in 1987.

== Schedule ==
Date	Opponent	Site	TV	Result	Attendance	Source
August 30	No. 3 Miami (FL)	Williams–Brice Stadium; Columbia, SC	ESPN	L 14–34	73,500	
September 6	at Virginia	Scott Stadium; Charlottesville, VA		L 20–31	34,700	
September 13	Western Carolina	Williams-Brice Stadium; Columbia, SC		W 45–24	65,731	
September 27	Georgia	Williams–Brice Stadium; Columbia, SC (rivalry)	ESPN	L 26–31	74,200	
October 4	No. 3 Nebraska	Williams–Brice Stadium; Columbia, SC		L 24–27	73,109	
October 11	at Virginia Tech	Lane Stadium; Blacksburg, VA		T 27–27	40,700	
October 25	East Carolina	Williams–Brice Stadium; Columbia, SC		W 38–3	68,327	
November 1	at No. 16 NC State	Carter–Finley Stadium; Raleigh, NC		L 22–23	50,230	
November 8	Florida State	Williams-Brice Stadium; Columbia, SC		L 28–45	71,689	
November 15	Wake Forest	Williams-Brice Stadium; Columbia, SC		W 48–21	64,186	
November 22	at No. 19 Clemson	Memorial Stadium; Clemson, SC (rivalry)		T 21–21	82,492	
Rankings from AP Poll released prior to the game
