= Sid Lewis =

American football player (born 1964)

No. 21
- Position: Cornerback

Personal information
- Born: May 30, 1964 (age 62); Canton, Ohio, U.S.
- Listed height: 5 ft 11 in (1.80 m)
- Listed weight: 180 lb (82 kg)

Career information
- High school: McKinley (Canton)
- College: Penn State
- NFL draft: 1987: 10th round, 268th overall pick

Career history
- New York Jets (1987)

Awards and highlights
- National champion (1986)
- Stats at Pro Football Reference

Sidney Scot Lewis (born May 30, 1964) is an American former professional football defensive back. He had played for the New York Jets of the National Football League (NFL) in 1987. He was selected by the Jets in the tenth round of the 1987 NFL draft. He played college football at Penn State University.
