= 1986 Virginia Tech Hokies football team =

American college football season

1986 Virginia Tech Hokies football

Peach Bowl champion

Peach Bowl, W 25–24 vs. NC State
- Conference: Independent

Ranking
- AP: No. 20
- Record: 9–2–1
- Head coach: Bill Dooley (9th season)
- Defensive coordinator: Bob Brush (3rd season)
- Home stadium: Lane Stadium

1986 NCAA Division I-A independents football records
	Conf.					Overall
Team	W		L		T	W		L		T
No. 1 Penn State		–		–		12	–	0	–	0
No. 2 Miami (FL)		–		–		11	–	1	–	0
No. 20 Virginia Tech		–		–		9	–	2	–	1
No. 19 Boston College		–		–		9	–	3	–	0
Tulsa		–		–		7	–	4	–	0
Florida State		–		–		7	–	4	–	1
Army		–		–		6	–	5	–	0
Southwestern Louisiana		–		–		6	–	5	–	0
Southern Miss		–		–		6	–	5	–	0
Temple		–		–		6	–	5	–	0
Pittsburgh		–		–		5	–	5	–	1
Rutgers		–		–		5	–	5	–	1
Cincinnati		–		–		5	–	6	–	0
Notre Dame		–		–		5	–	6	–	0
Syracuse		–		–		5	–	6	–	0
South Carolina		–		–		3	–	6	–	2
Tulane		–		–		4	–	7	–	0
West Virginia		–		–		4	–	7	–	0
Louisville		–		–		3	–	8	–	0
Navy		–		–		3	–	8	–	0
Wichita State		–		–		3	–	8	–	0
East Carolina		–		–		2	–	9	–	0
Northern Illinois		–		–		2	–	9	–	0
Memphis State		–		–		1	–	10	–	0
Rankings from AP Poll

The 1986 Virginia Tech Hokies football team represented the Virginia Polytechnic Institute and State University during the 1986 NCAA Division I-A football season. The team's head coach was Bill Dooley.

== Schedule ==
Date	Opponent	Site	TV	Result	Attendance	Source
September 6	Cincinnati	Lane Stadium; Blacksburg, VA		L 20–24	22,700	
September 13	at Clemson	Memorial Stadium; Clemson, SC	Jefferson-Pilot	W 20–14	75,930	
September 20	at Syracuse	Carrier Dome; Syracuse, NY	Creative Sports Marketing	W 26–17	27,466	
September 27	East Tennessee State	Lane Stadium; Blacksburg, VA		W 37–10	34,400	
October 4	West Virginia	Lane Stadium; Blacksburg, VA (rivalry)	Creative Sports Marketing	W 13–7	50,000	
October 11	South Carolina^{†}	Lane Stadium; Blacksburg, VA		T 27–27	40,700	
October 18	vs. Temple	Foreman Field; Norfolk, VA (Oyster Bowl)	WDBJ, WRLH, WHSV, WTVZ	W 13–29 (forfeit win)	23,500	
October 25	Virginia	Lane Stadium; Blacksburg, VA (rivalry)		W 42–10	51,400	
November 1	Kentucky	Lane Stadium; Blacksburg, VA		W 17–15	30,300	
November 8	at Richmond	UR Stadium; Richmond, VA	WDBJ, WRLH, WHSV, WTVZ	W 17–10	22,600	
November 15	Vanderbilt	Lane Stadium; Blacksburg, VA		W 29–21	27,300	
December 31	vs. No. 18 NC State	Atlanta–Fulton County Stadium; Atlanta, GA (Peach Bowl)	Mizlou	W 25–24	53,668	
^{†}Homecoming; Rankings from AP Poll released prior to the game

== Rankings ==
Ranking movements Legend: ██ Increase in ranking ██ Decrease in ranking — = Not ranked
	Week														
Poll	Pre	1	2	3	4	5	6	7	8	9	10	11	12	13	Final
AP	—	—	—	—	—	—	—	—	—	—	—	—	—	—	20
Coaches Poll	—	—	—	—	—	—	—	—	—	—	—	—	—	20	—

== Roster ==
Quarterback: **Erik Chapman**; Jeff Roberts; Running Back: **Earnie Jones**; **Maurice Williams**; Malcolm Blacken; Sean Donnelly; Rich Fox; Eddie Hunter; Wide Receiver: **David Everett**; **Myron Richardson**; Randy Jamison; Donald Wayne Snell; Tight End: **Steve Johnson**	Offensive Line: **Jim Davie**; **John FitzHugh**; **Tom Hall**; **Kevin Keefe**; **Ron Singleton**; Ernie Davis; Rodney Good; Todd Grantham; Chris Henderson; Defensive Line: **Scott Hill**; **Horacio Moronta**; **Morgan Roane**; **Curtis Taliaferro**; **Mark Webb**; Bo Cothran; Al Wiley	Linebacker: **Jamel Agemy**; **Lawrence White**; Leslie Bailey; Randy Cockrell; Defensive Back: **Mitch Dove**; **Billy Myers**; **Scott Rice**; **Carter Wiley**; Bo Blankenship; Eddie Neel
Source: https://www.sports-reference.com/cfb/schools/virginia-tech/1986-roster.html Starters are in **bold**
