= 1986 Boston College Eagles football team =

American college football season

1986 Boston College Eagles football

Hall of Fame Bowl champion

Hall of Fame, W 27–24 vs. Georgia
- Conference: Independent

Ranking
- Coaches: No. 18
- AP: No. 19
- Record: 9–3
- Head coach: Jack Bicknell (6th season)
- Defensive coordinator: Seymour "Red" Kelin (6th season)
- Captains: John Bosa; Kelvin Martin; Troy Stradford; Steve Trapilo
- Home stadium: Alumni Stadium; Sullivan Stadium

1986 Major eastern college football independents records
	Conf.					Overall
Team	W		L		T	W		L		T
No. 1 Penn State $	6	–	0	–	0	12	–	0	–	0
No. 19 Boston College	3	–	2	–	0	9	–	3	–	0
Syracuse	3	–	3	–	0	5	–	6	–	0
Temple	2	–	3	–	0	6	–	5	–	0
Pittsburgh	2	–	3	–	0	5	–	5	–	1
Rutgers	2	–	4	–	0	5	–	5	–	1
West Virginia	1	–	4	–	0	4	–	7	–	0
$ – Lambert Trophy Winner; Rankings from AP Poll

1986 NCAA Division I-A independents football records
	Conf.					Overall
Team	W		L		T	W		L		T
No. 1 Penn State		–		–		12	–	0	–	0
No. 2 Miami (FL)		–		–		11	–	1	–	0
No. 20 Virginia Tech		–		–		9	–	2	–	1
No. 19 Boston College		–		–		9	–	3	–	0
Tulsa		–		–		7	–	4	–	0
Florida State		–		–		7	–	4	–	1
Army		–		–		6	–	5	–	0
Southwestern Louisiana		–		–		6	–	5	–	0
Southern Miss		–		–		6	–	5	–	0
Temple		–		–		6	–	5	–	0
Pittsburgh		–		–		5	–	5	–	1
Rutgers		–		–		5	–	5	–	1
Cincinnati		–		–		5	–	6	–	0
Notre Dame		–		–		5	–	6	–	0
Syracuse		–		–		5	–	6	–	0
South Carolina		–		–		3	–	6	–	2
Tulane		–		–		4	–	7	–	0
West Virginia		–		–		4	–	7	–	0
Louisville		–		–		3	–	8	–	0
Navy		–		–		3	–	8	–	0
Wichita State		–		–		3	–	8	–	0
East Carolina		–		–		2	–	9	–	0
Northern Illinois		–		–		2	–	9	–	0
Memphis State		–		–		1	–	10	–	0
Rankings from AP Poll

The 1986 Boston College Eagles football team represented Boston College as an independent during the 1986 NCAA Division I-A football season. The Eagles were led by sixth-year head coach Jack Bicknell and played their home games at Alumni Stadium in Chestnut Hill, Massachusetts. They also played an alternate-site home game at Sullivan Stadium (later known as Foxboro Stadium) in Foxborough, Massachusetts. Boston College ended the season on an eight-game winning streak, capped by the 1986 Hall of Fame Bowl, where they defeated Georgia, 27–24 on a last-minute touchdown pass from Shawn Halloran to Kelvin Martin.

== Schedule ==
Date	Opponent	Site	TV	Result	Attendance	Source
September 6	Rutgers	Alumni Stadium; Chestnut Hill, MA		L 9–11	30,000	
September 13	California	Alumni Stadium; Chestnut Hill, MA		W 21–15	30,544	
September 20	No. 5 Penn State	Sullivan Stadium; Foxborough, MA		L 14–26	42,329	
October 4	at SMU	Texas Stadium; Irving, TX		L 29–31	26,432	
October 11	at Maryland	Byrd Stadium; College Park, MD		W 30–25	45,380	
October 18	Louisville	Alumni Stadium; Chestnut Hill, MA		W 41–7	28,105	
October 25	at West Virginia	Mountaineer Field; Morgantown, WV		W 19–10	47,760	
November 1	at Army	Michie Stadium; West Point, NY		W 27–20	40,315	
November 8	at Temple	Veterans Stadium; Philadelphia, PA		W 38–29	17,952	
November 15	Syracuse	Alumni Stadium; Chestnut Hill, MA		W 27–9	32,000	
November 22	at Holy Cross	Fitton Field; Worcester, MA (rivalry)		W 56–26	23,271	
December 23	vs. No. 17 Georgia	Tampa Stadium; Tampa, FL (Hall of Fame Bowl)	Mizlou	W 27–24	25,368	
Rankings from AP Poll released prior to the game

== Roster ==
1986 Boston College Eagles football team roster
Players
Coaches
Offense

Pos.	#	Name	Class
QB	7	Shawn Halloran	Sr
WR	82	Kelvin Martin	Sr
C		Darren Twombly	Sr
WR	20	Tom Waddle	So
OT	69	Dave Widell	Jr
G	74	Doug Widell	So
OL	64	Joe Wolf	So

Defense

Pos.	#	Name	Class
DE	97	John Bosa	Sr
LB	55	John Galvin	Jr
DT	72	Tom Porell	Sr
LB	53	Bill Romanowski	Jr

Special teams

Pos.	#	Name	Class

Head coach

- Jack Bicknell

Coordinators/assistant coaches

Legend

- (C) Team captain
- (S) Suspended
- (I) Ineligible
- Injured
- Redshirt
