= 1986 Penn State Nittany Lions football team =

American college football season

1986 Penn State Nittany Lions football

Consensus national champion Fiesta Bowl champion Eastern champion

Fiesta Bowl, W 14–10 vs. Miami (FL)
- Conference: Independent

Ranking
- Coaches: No. 1
- AP: No. 1
- Record: 12–0
- Head coach: Joe Paterno (21st season)
- Offensive coordinator: Fran Ganter (3rd season)
- Offensive scheme: Pro-style
- Defensive coordinator: Jerry Sandusky (10th season)
- Base defense: 4–3
- Captains: Shane Conlan; John Shaffer; Steve Smith; Bob White
- Home stadium: Beaver Stadium • University Park, Pennsylvania

1986 Major eastern college football independents records
	Conf.					Overall
Team	W		L		T	W		L		T
No. 1 Penn State $	6	–	0	–	0	12	–	0	–	0
No. 19 Boston College	3	–	2	–	0	9	–	3	–	0
Syracuse	3	–	3	–	0	5	–	6	–	0
Temple	2	–	3	–	0	6	–	5	–	0
Pittsburgh	2	–	3	–	0	5	–	5	–	1
Rutgers	2	–	4	–	0	5	–	5	–	1
West Virginia	1	–	4	–	0	4	–	7	–	0
$ – Lambert Trophy Winner; Rankings from AP Poll

1986 NCAA Division I-A independents football records
	Conf.					Overall
Team	W		L		T	W		L		T
No. 1 Penn State		–		–		12	–	0	–	0
No. 2 Miami (FL)		–		–		11	–	1	–	0
No. 20 Virginia Tech		–		–		9	–	2	–	1
No. 19 Boston College		–		–		9	–	3	–	0
Tulsa		–		–		7	–	4	–	0
Florida State		–		–		7	–	4	–	1
Army		–		–		6	–	5	–	0
Southwestern Louisiana		–		–		6	–	5	–	0
Southern Miss		–		–		6	–	5	–	0
Temple		–		–		6	–	5	–	0
Pittsburgh		–		–		5	–	5	–	1
Rutgers		–		–		5	–	5	–	1
Cincinnati		–		–		5	–	6	–	0
Notre Dame		–		–		5	–	6	–	0
Syracuse		–		–		5	–	6	–	0
South Carolina		–		–		3	–	6	–	2
Tulane		–		–		4	–	7	–	0
West Virginia		–		–		4	–	7	–	0
Louisville		–		–		3	–	8	–	0
Navy		–		–		3	–	8	–	0
Wichita State		–		–		3	–	8	–	0
East Carolina		–		–		2	–	9	–	0
Northern Illinois		–		–		2	–	9	–	0
Memphis State		–		–		1	–	10	–	0
Rankings from AP Poll

The 1986 Penn State Nittany Lions football team represented the Pennsylvania State University as an independent during the 1986 NCAA Division I-A football season. Led by 21st-year head coach Joe Paterno, the Nittany Lions compiled a record of 12–0. Penn State defeated the Miami Hurricanes, 14–10, in the 1987 Fiesta Bowl to win Paterno's second consensus national championship. The team was named national champion by AP, Billingsley, FB News, FW, Matthews, NCF, NFF, Sporting News, UPI, and USA/CNN, while named co-champion by FACT, Sagarin (ELO-Chess).

== Schedule ==
Date	Time	Opponent	Rank	Site	TV	Result	Attendance	Source
September 6	7:00 p.m.	Temple	No. 6	Beaver Stadium; University Park, PA	TCS	W 45–15	85,732	
September 20	7:00 p.m.	at Boston College	No. 5	Sullivan Stadium; Foxborough, MA	ESPN	W 26–14	42,329	
September 27	1:30 p.m.	East Carolina	No. 7	Beaver Stadium; University Park, PA	TCS	W 42–17	84,774	
October 4	12:20 p.m.	Rutgers	No. 5	Beaver Stadium; University Park, PA	TCS	W 31–6	84,000	
October 11	12:20 p.m.	Cincinnati	No. 5	Beaver Stadium; University Park, PA	TCS	W 23–17	84,812	
October 18	1:30 p.m.	Syracuse^{†}	No. 6	Beaver Stadium; University Park, PA (rivalry)	TCS	W 42–3	85,512	
October 25	3:30 p.m.	at No. 2 Alabama	No. 6	Bryant–Denny Stadium; Tuscaloosa, AL (rivalry)	ABC	W 23–3	60,210	
November 1	7:30 p.m.	at West Virginia	No. 2	Mountaineer Field; Morgantown, WV (rivalry)	ESPN	W 19–0	59,184	
November 8	1:00 p.m.	Maryland	No. 2	Beaver Stadium; University Park, PA (rivalry)	TCS	W 17–15	85,561	
November 15	3:30 p.m.	at Notre Dame	No. 3	Notre Dame Stadium; Notre Dame, IN (rivalry)	ABC	W 24–19	59,075	
November 22	12:20 p.m.	Pittsburgh	No. 2	Beaver Stadium; University Park, PA (rivalry)	TCS	W 34–14	55,338	
January 2, 1987	8:00 p.m.	vs. No. 1 Miami (FL)	No. 2	Sun Devil Stadium; Tempe, AZ (Fiesta Bowl)	NBC	W 14–10	73,098	
^{†}Homecoming; Rankings from AP Poll released prior to the game; All times are in Eastern time

== Rankings ==
=== AP poll ===
Pre	1	2	3	4	5	6	7	8	9	10	11	12	13	Final
6	5	5	7	5	5	6	6	2	2	3	2	2	2	1

=== UPI Poll ===
Pre	1	2	3	4	5	6	7	8	9	10	11	12	13	Final
5	5	6	6	5	4	5	5	3	2	3	2	2	2	1

== Game summaries ==
=== Temple ===
Temple Owls at No. 6 Penn State Nittany Lions – Game summary

Quarter	1	2	3	4	Total
Owls	0	6	0	9	15
No. 6 Nittany Lions	21	3	14	7	45

at Beaver Stadium • University Park, Pennsylvania

- Date: September 6
- Game time: 7:00 p.m. EDT
- Game attendance: 85,732
- TV announcers (TCS): Stan Savran, George Paterno

=== At Boston College ===
No. 5 Penn State Nittany Lions at Boston College Eagles – Game summary

Quarter	1	2	3	4	Total
No. 5 Nittany Lions	9	3	7	7	26
Eagles	0	0	7	7	14

at Sullivan Stadium • Foxborough, Massachusetts

- Date: September 20
- Game time: 7:00 p.m. EDT
- Game attendance: 42,329
- TV announcers (ESPN): Mike Patrick, Kevin Kiley, Tim Brando

=== East Carolina ===
East Carolina Pirates at No. 7 Penn State Nittany Lions – Game summary

Quarter	1	2	3	4	Total
Pirates	0	0	3	14	17
No. 7 Nittany Lions	14	21	0	7	42

at Beaver Stadium • University Park, Pennsylvania

- Date: September 27
- Game time: 1:30 p.m. EDT
- Game attendance: 84,774
- TV announcers (TCS): Stan Savran and George Paterno

=== Rutgers ===
Rutgers Scarlet Knights at No. 5 Penn State Nittany Lions – Game summary

Quarter	1	2	3	4	Total
Scarlet Knights	0	0	0	6	6
No. 5 Nittany Lions	14	3	7	7	31

at Beaver Stadium • University Park, Pennsylvania

- Date: October 4
- Game time: 12:20 p.m. EDT
- Game attendance: 84,000
- TV announcers (TCS): Stan Savran and George Paterno

=== Cincinnati ===
Cincinnati Bearcats at No. 5 Penn State Nittany Lions – Game summary

Quarter	1	2	3	4	Total
Bearcats	0	7	7	3	17
No. 5 Nittany Linos	0	14	0	9	23

at Beaver Stadium • University Park, Pennsylvania

- Date: October 11
- Game time: 12:20 p.m. EDT
- Game attendance: 84,812
- TV announcers (TCS): Stan Savran and George Paterno

=== Syracuse ===
Syracuse Orange at No. 6 Penn State Nittany Lions – Game summary

Quarter	1	2	3	4	Total
Orange	0	0	0	3	3
No. 6 Nittany Lions	17	9	21	7	54

at Beaver Stadium • University Park, Pennsylvania

- Date: October 18
- Game time: 1:30 p.m. EDT
- Game attendance: 85,512
- TV announcers (TCS): Stan Savran and George Paterno

=== At No. 2 Alabama ===
No. 6 Penn State Nittany Lions at No. 2 Alabama Crimson Tide – Game summary

Quarter	1	2	3	4	Total
No. 6 Nittany Lions	0	14	3	6	23
No. 2 Crimson Tide	3	0	0	0	3

at Bryant–Denny Stadium • Tuscaloosa, Alabama

- Date: October 25
- Game time: 3:30 p.m. EDT / 2:30 p.m. CDT
- Game attendance: 60,210
- TV announcers (ABC): Keith Jackson, Tim Brant, Al Trautwig

Game information

First Quarter

- ALA – Van Tiffin 40-yard field goal. Crimson Tide 3–0.

Second Quarter

- PSU – D. J. Dozier 19-yard run (Massima Manca kick). Nittany Lions 7–3.
- PSU – Blair Thomas 3-yard run (Massima Manca kick). Nittany Lions 14–3.

Third Quarter

- PSU – Massima Manca 37-yard field goal. Nittany Lions 17–3.

Fourth Quarter

- PSU – Massima Manca 29-yard field goal. Nittany Lions 20–3.
- PSU – Massima Manca 42-yard field goal. Nittany Lions 23–3.

=== At West Virginia ===
No. 2 Penn State Nittany Lions at West Virginia Mountaineers – Game summary

Quarter	1	2	3	4	Total
No. 2 Nittany Lions	7	6	6	0	19
Mountaineers	0	0	0	0	0

at Mountaineer Field • Morgantown, West Virginia

- Date: November 1
- Game time: 7:30 p.m. EST
- Game attendance: 59,184
- TV announcers (ESPN): Mike Patrick, Kevin Kiley, and Tim Brando

Game information

First quarter

- PSU – D. J. Dozier 23-yard pass from John Shaffer (Massima Manca kick), 10:55. Nittany Lions 7–0.

Second quarter

- PSU – Massima Manca 42-yard field goal, 12:08. Nittany Lions 10–0.
- PSU – Manca, 37-yard field goal, 7:59 (PSU 13–0)

Third quarter

- PSU – Massima Manca 22-yard field goal, 6:04. Nittany Lions 16–0.
- PSU – Massima Manca 27-yard field goal, 3:13. Nittany Lions 19–0.

Fourth quarter

No scoring plays

=== Maryland ===
Maryland Terrapins at No. 2 Penn State Nittany Lions – Game summary

Quarter	1	2	3	4	Total
Terrapins	0	0	3	12	15
No. 2 Nittany Lions	0	7	0	10	17

at Beaver Stadium • University Park, Pennsylvania

- Date: November 8
- Game time: 1:00 p.m. EST
- Game attendance: 85,651
- TV announcers (TCS): Stan Savran and George Paterno

Game information

First quarter

No scoring plays

Second quarter

- PSU – Dozier, 1-yard TD run, Manca kick good, (PSU 7–0)

Third quarter

- MD – Plocki, 18-yard field goal, (PSU 7–3)

Fourth quarter

- PSU – Dozier, 9-yard TD run, Manca kick good, (PSU 14–3)
- MD – Joines, 16-yard TD pass from Henning, 2-point pass failed, (PSU 14–9)
- PSU – Manca, 37-yard field goal, (PSU 17–9)
- MD – Bonato, 27-yard TD pass from Henning, 2-point pass failed, (PSU 17–15)

=== At Notre Dame ===
No. 3 Penn State Nittany Lions at Notre Dame Fighting Irish – Game summary

Quarter	1	2	3	4	Total
No. 3 Nittany Lions	7	3	7	7	24
Fighting Irish	0	6	7	6	19

at Notre Dame Stadium • Notre Dame, Indiana

- Date: November 15
- Game time: 3:30 p.m. EST
- Game attendance: 59,075
- TV announcers (ABC): Keith Jackson, Tim Brant, and Al Trautwig

=== Pittsburgh ===
Pittsburgh Panthers at No. 2 Penn State Nittany Lions – Game summary

Quarter	1	2	3	4	Total
Panthers	7	0	0	7	14
No. 2 Nittany Lions	10	7	10	7	34

at Beaver Stadium • University Park, Pennsylvania

- Date: November 22
- Game time: 12:20 p.m. EST
- Game attendance: 85,722
- TV announcers (TCS): Stan Savran and George Paterno

=== Vs. No. 1 Miami (FL)—Fiesta Bowl ===
1987 Fiesta Bowl
No. 1 Miami Hurricanes vs. No. 2 Penn State Nittany Lions – Game summary

Quarter	1	2	3	4	Total
No. 1 Hurricanes	0	7	0	3	10
No. 2 Nittany Lions	0	7	0	7	14

at Sun Devil Stadium • Tempe, Arizona

- Date: January 2, 1987
- Game time: 8:00 p.m. EST / 6:00 p.m. MST
- Game attendance: 73,098
- Referee: Jimmy Harper
- TV announcers (NBC): Charlie Jones, Bob Griese, Jimmy Cefalo, Ahmad Rashad

Game information

First quarter

No scoring plays

Second quarter

- MIA – Bratton, 1-yard TD run, Seelig kick good, 6:38 (MIA 7–0)
- PSU – Shaffer, 4-yard TD run, Manca kick good, 1:14 (TIE 7–7)

Third quarter

No scoring

Fourth quarter

- MIA – Seelig, 38-yard field goal, 11:49 (MIA 10–7)
- PSU – Dozier, 6-yard TD run, Manca kick good, 8:13 (PSU 14–10)

== Roster ==
1986 Penn State Nittany Lions football team roster
Players
Coaches
Offense

Pos.	#	Name	Class
WR	9	Mike Alexander	Jr
FB	29	Sean Barowski	Fr
OT	74	Stan Clayton	Jr
G	57	Chris Conlin	Sr
RB	42	D. J. Dozier	Jr
C	78	Roger Duffy	Fr
G	54	Mitch Frerotte	Sr
FB	27	John Hornyak	Sr
FB	44	Tim Manoa	Sr
G	59	Dan Morgan	Sr
TE	89	Bob Mrosko	So
TE	88	Paul Pomfret	Jr
C	56	Keith Radecic	Sr
WR	6	Ray Roundtree	Jr
QB	14	John Shaffer	Sr
TE	91	Brian Siverling	Sr
RB	35	Steve Smith	Sr
G	79	Dave Szott	Fr
RB	32	Blair Thomas	So
WR	5	Michael Timpson	So
G	66	Steve Wisniewski	So
C	72	Mike Wolf	Jr

Defense

Pos.	#	Name	Class
LB	35	Trey Bauer	Jr
NT	70	Darryl Bullock	So
CB	16	Duffy Cobbs	Sr
CB/S	43	Andre Collins	Fr
LB	31	Shane Conlan	Sr
LB	90	Pete Giftopoulos	Jr
LB	53	Don Graham	Sr
S	2	Stu Helgeson	Jr
H	3	Marques Henderson	Jr
S	22	Ray Isom	Sr
LB	55	Tim Johnson	Sr
LB	52	Gregg Johns	Jr
LB	84	Keith Karpinski	Jr
DB	21	Sid Lewis	Sr
LB	92	Quintus McDonald	So
LB	33	John Sweenely	So
CB	19	Gary Wilkerson	So

Special teams

Pos.	#	Name	Class
P	11	John Bruno	Sr
PK	10	Massimo Manca	Sr
K	2	Ray Tarasi	Fr
SN	68	Greg Truitt	Jr

Head coach

- Joe Paterno

Coordinators/assistant coaches

- Tom Bradley
- Jim Caldwell
- Ron Dickerson
- Chet Fuhrman
- Fran Ganter
- Nick Gasparato
- Bob Phillips
- Joe Sarra
- Jerry Sandusky
- Paul Shaffner (GA)
- Jim Williams

Legend

- (C) Team captain
- (S) Suspended
- (I) Ineligible
- Injured
- Redshirt

Roster
Last update: 2015-12-20

== Awards ==
- Joe Paterno

Eddie Robinson Coach of the Year
Paul "Bear" Bryant Award

== NFL draft ==
Thirteen Nittany Lions were drafted in the 1987 NFL draft.

Round	Pick	Overall	Name	Position	Team
1st	8	8	Shane Conlan	Linebacker	Buffalo Bills
1st	14	14	D.J. Dozier	Running back	Minnesota Vikings
3rd	24	80	Tim Manoa	Running back	Cleveland Browns
3rd	25	81	Steve Smith	Running back	Los Angeles Raiders
4th	1	84	Don Graham	Linebacker	Tampa Bay Buccaneers
5th	14	126	John Bruno	Punter	St. Louis Cardinals
5th	20	132	Chris Conlin	Offensive guard	Miami Dolphins
6th	1	141	Tim Johnson	Defensive end	Pittsburgh Steelers
6th	22	162	Bob White	Defensive line	San Francisco 49ers
8th	27	222	Dan Morgan	Offensive guard	Denver Broncos
9th	24	247	Bob Ontko	Linebacker	Indianapolis Colts
10th	17	268	Sid Lewis	Defensive back	New York Jets
11th	7	286	Brian Siverling	Tight End	Detroit Lions

== Media ==
=== Radio ===
Flagship station	Play-by-play	Color commentator	Sideline reporter	Studio host
WMAJ AM 1450	Gil Santos; Lanny Frattare			
