= 1986 Syracuse Orangemen football team =

American college football season

1986 Syracuse Orangemen football
- Conference: Independent
- Record: 5–6
- Head coach: Dick MacPherson (6th season)
- Captains: Pete Ewald; Jim Leible; Tim Pidgeon
- Home stadium: Carrier Dome

1986 Major eastern college football independents records
	Conf.					Overall
Team	W		L		T	W		L		T
No. 1 Penn State $	6	–	0	–	0	12	–	0	–	0
No. 19 Boston College	3	–	2	–	0	9	–	3	–	0
Syracuse	3	–	3	–	0	5	–	6	–	0
Temple	2	–	3	–	0	6	–	5	–	0
Pittsburgh	2	–	3	–	0	5	–	5	–	1
Rutgers	2	–	4	–	0	5	–	5	–	1
West Virginia	1	–	4	–	0	4	–	7	–	0
$ – Lambert Trophy Winner; Rankings from AP Poll

1986 NCAA Division I-A independents football records
	Conf.					Overall
Team	W		L		T	W		L		T
No. 1 Penn State		–		–		12	–	0	–	0
No. 2 Miami (FL)		–		–		11	–	1	–	0
No. 20 Virginia Tech		–		–		9	–	2	–	1
No. 19 Boston College		–		–		9	–	3	–	0
Tulsa		–		–		7	–	4	–	0
Florida State		–		–		7	–	4	–	1
Army		–		–		6	–	5	–	0
Southwestern Louisiana		–		–		6	–	5	–	0
Southern Miss		–		–		6	–	5	–	0
Temple		–		–		6	–	5	–	0
Pittsburgh		–		–		5	–	5	–	1
Rutgers		–		–		5	–	5	–	1
Cincinnati		–		–		5	–	6	–	0
Notre Dame		–		–		5	–	6	–	0
Syracuse		–		–		5	–	6	–	0
South Carolina		–		–		3	–	6	–	2
Tulane		–		–		4	–	7	–	0
West Virginia		–		–		4	–	7	–	0
Louisville		–		–		3	–	8	–	0
Navy		–		–		3	–	8	–	0
Wichita State		–		–		3	–	8	–	0
East Carolina		–		–		2	–	9	–	0
Northern Illinois		–		–		2	–	9	–	0
Memphis State		–		–		1	–	10	–	0
Rankings from AP Poll

The 1986 Syracuse Orangemen football team represented Syracuse University as an independent during the 1986 NCAA Division I-A football season. Led by sixth-year head coach Dick MacPherson, the Orangemen compiled a record of 5–6. Syracuse played home games at the Carrier Dome in Syracuse, New York.

== Schedule ==
Date	Opponent	Site	Result	Attendance	Source
September 6	Mississippi State	Carrier Dome; Syracuse, NY	L 17–24	34,216	
September 13	at Army	Michie Stadium; West Point, NY	L 28–33	38,822	
September 20	Virginia Tech	Carrier Dome; Syracuse, NY	L 17–26	27,466	
September 27	Rutgers	Carrier Dome; Syracuse, NY	L 10–16	33,577	
October 4	Missouri	Carrier Dome; Syracuse, NY	W 41–9	41,035	
October 18	at No. 6 Penn State	Beaver Stadium; University Park, PA (rivalry)	L 3–42	85,512	
October 25	at Temple	Veterans Stadium; Philadelphia, PA	W 27–24	19,422	
November 1	Pittsburgh	Carrier Dome; Syracuse, NY (rivalry)	W 24–20	34,114	
November 8	Navy	Carrier Dome; Syracuse, NY	W 31–22	36,796	
November 15	at Boston College	Alumni Stadium; Chestnut Hill, MA	L 9–27	32,000	
November 22	at West Virginia	Mountaineer Field; Morgantown, WV (rivalry)	W 34–23	40,106	
Rankings from AP Poll released prior to the game

== Roster ==
1986 Syracuse Orange football team roster
Players
Coaches
Offense

Pos.	#	Name	Class
OT	68	Tom Bennett	Fr
TE	87	Pat Davis	So
RB	36	Robert Drummond	So
TE	89	Terry Dougherty	Fr
G	56	John Garrett	Sr
OT	69	Shawn Garrity	Sr
G	64	Ken Jenkins	Sr
RB	32	Daryl Johnston	So
TE	84	Pat Kelly	Jr
C	77	Jim Leible	Sr
QB	9	Don McPherson	Jr
RB	43	Len Nelson	So
WR	18	William Pennyfeather	Fr
QB	5	Todd Philcox	So
WR	16	Scott Schwedes	Sr
OT	76	Craig Stoeppel	So

Defense

Pos.	#	Name	Class
DL	85	John Dominic	Jr
DL	71	Wes Dove	Sr
DT	94	Paul Frase	Jr
NG	93	Ted Gregory	Jr
DB	24	Chris Ingram	So
DB	28	Jeff Mangram	So
DB	10	Markus Paul	So
LB	54	Tim Pidgeon	Sr
LB	99	Roger Remo	Sr
DB	21	Jim Sheedy	Sr
DL	91	Claus Stuhlweissenburg	Jr
LB	52	Derek Ward	Jr
LB	90	Terry Wooden	Fr

Special teams

Pos.	#	Name	Class
P	4	Jim Fox	Jr

Head coach

- Dick MacPherson

Coordinators/assistant coaches

Legend

- (C) Team captain
- (S) Suspended
- (I) Ineligible
- Injured
- Redshirt
