= 1986 Navy Midshipmen football team =

American college football season

1986 Navy Midshipmen football
- Conference: Independent
- Record: 3–8
- Head coach: Gary Tranquill (5th season)
- MVP: Vince McBeth
- Captains: Bill Byrne; Vince McBeth
- Home stadium: Navy–Marine Corps Memorial Stadium

1986 NCAA Division I-A independents football records
	Conf.					Overall
Team	W		L		T	W		L		T
No. 1 Penn State		–		–		12	–	0	–	0
No. 2 Miami (FL)		–		–		11	–	1	–	0
No. 20 Virginia Tech		–		–		9	–	2	–	1
No. 19 Boston College		–		–		9	–	3	–	0
Tulsa		–		–		7	–	4	–	0
Florida State		–		–		7	–	4	–	1
Army		–		–		6	–	5	–	0
Southwestern Louisiana		–		–		6	–	5	–	0
Southern Miss		–		–		6	–	5	–	0
Temple		–		–		6	–	5	–	0
Pittsburgh		–		–		5	–	5	–	1
Rutgers		–		–		5	–	5	–	1
Cincinnati		–		–		5	–	6	–	0
Notre Dame		–		–		5	–	6	–	0
Syracuse		–		–		5	–	6	–	0
South Carolina		–		–		3	–	6	–	2
Tulane		–		–		4	–	7	–	0
West Virginia		–		–		4	–	7	–	0
Louisville		–		–		3	–	8	–	0
Navy		–		–		3	–	8	–	0
Wichita State		–		–		3	–	8	–	0
East Carolina		–		–		2	–	9	–	0
Northern Illinois		–		–		2	–	9	–	0
Memphis State		–		–		1	–	10	–	0
Rankings from AP Poll

The 1986 Navy Midshipmen football team represented the United States Naval Academy (USNA) as an independent during the 1986 NCAA Division I-A football season. The team was led by fifth-year head coach Gary Tranquill.

== Schedule ==
Date	Opponent	Site	TV	Result	Attendance	Source
September 13	Virginia	Navy–Marine Corps Memorial Stadium; Annapolis, MD		W 20–10	30,057	
September 20	at Indiana	Memorial Stadium; Bloomington, IN		L 29–52	32,434	
September 27	Lehigh	Navy–Marine Corps Memorial Stadium; Annapolis, MD		W 41–0	21,388	
October 4	Dartmouth^{†}	Navy–Marine Corps Memorial Stadium; Annapolis, MD		W 45–0	31,543	
October 11	at Air Force	Falcon Stadium; Colorado Springs, CO (Commander-in-Chief's Trophy)		L 6–40	51,004	
October 18	Penn	Navy–Marine Corps Memorial Stadium; Annapolis, MD		L 26–30	23,959	
October 25	at Pittsburgh	Pitt Stadium; Pittsburgh, PA		L 14–56	45,345	
November 1	Notre Dame	Memorial Stadium; Baltimore, MD (rivalry)	TBS	L 14–33	61,335	
November 8	at Syracuse	Carrier Dome; Syracuse, NY		L 22–31	36,796	
November 15	Delaware	Navy–Marine Corps Memorial Stadium; Annapolis, MD		L 14–27	30,089	
December 6	vs. Army	Veterans Stadium; Philadelphia, PA (Army–Navy Game)		L 7–27	71,570	
^{†}Homecoming

== Roster ==
1986 Navy Midshipmen football team roster
Players
Coaches
Offense

Pos.	#	Name	Class
QB	15	Bill Byrne
RB	21	Don Holl
RB	34	Tony Hollinger
WR		Don Hughes
RB		Jim Kirk
QB	11	Joe Lauletta
RB		John McKenna
QB	18	Bob Misch
WR		Mike Ray
WR		Troy Saunders
RB	38	Chuck Smith
RB		Mike Smith
TE		John Sniffen
TE	87	Kevin Voss
WR		Vernon Wallace

Defense

Pos.	#	Name	Class
DB	41	Marc Firlie
	40	John Fuller
DB	10	Mike Herron
	20	Mark Kiefer
LB	19	Vince McBeth

Special teams

Pos.	#	Name	Class
K		Ted Fundoukas

Head coach

- Gary Tranquill

Coordinators/assistant coaches

Legend

- (C) Team captain
- (S) Suspended
- (I) Ineligible
- Injured
- Redshirt
