= 1986 Temple Owls football team =

American college football season

1986 Temple Owls football
- Conference: Independent
- Record: 6–5
- Head coach: Bruce Arians (4th season)
- Defensive coordinator: Nick Rapone (2nd season)
- Home stadium: Veterans Stadium

1986 Major eastern college football independents records
| | Conf. | | | | | Overall |
| Team | W | | L | | T | W | | L | | T |
|---|---|---|---|---|---|---|---|---|---|---|
| No. 1 Penn State $ | 6 | – | 0 | – | 0 | 12 | – | 0 | – | 0 |
| No. 19 Boston College | 3 | – | 2 | – | 0 | 9 | – | 3 | – | 0 |
| Syracuse | 3 | – | 3 | – | 0 | 5 | – | 6 | – | 0 |
| Temple | 2 | – | 3 | – | 0 | 6 | – | 5 | – | 0 |
| Pittsburgh | 2 | – | 3 | – | 0 | 5 | – | 5 | – | 1 |
| Rutgers | 2 | – | 4 | – | 0 | 5 | – | 5 | – | 1 |
| West Virginia | 1 | – | 4 | – | 0 | 4 | – | 7 | – | 0 |
$ – Lambert Trophy Winner; Rankings from AP Poll

1986 NCAA Division I-A independents football records
| | Conf. | | | | | Overall |
| Team | W | | L | | T | W | | L | | T |
|---|---|---|---|---|---|---|---|---|---|---|
| No. 1 Penn State | | – | | – | | 12 | – | 0 | – | 0 |
| No. 2 Miami (FL) | | – | | – | | 11 | – | 1 | – | 0 |
| No. 20 Virginia Tech | | – | | – | | 9 | – | 2 | – | 1 |
| No. 19 Boston College | | – | | – | | 9 | – | 3 | – | 0 |
| Tulsa | | – | | – | | 7 | – | 4 | – | 0 |
| Florida State | | – | | – | | 7 | – | 4 | – | 1 |
| Army | | – | | – | | 6 | – | 5 | – | 0 |
| Southwestern Louisiana | | – | | – | | 6 | – | 5 | – | 0 |
| Southern Miss | | – | | – | | 6 | – | 5 | – | 0 |
| Temple | | – | | – | | 6 | – | 5 | – | 0 |
| Pittsburgh | | – | | – | | 5 | – | 5 | – | 1 |
| Rutgers | | – | | – | | 5 | – | 5 | – | 1 |
| Cincinnati | | – | | – | | 5 | – | 6 | – | 0 |
| Notre Dame | | – | | – | | 5 | – | 6 | – | 0 |
| Syracuse | | – | | – | | 5 | – | 6 | – | 0 |
| South Carolina | | – | | – | | 3 | – | 6 | – | 2 |
| Tulane | | – | | – | | 4 | – | 7 | – | 0 |
| West Virginia | | – | | – | | 4 | – | 7 | – | 0 |
| Louisville | | – | | – | | 3 | – | 8 | – | 0 |
| Navy | | – | | – | | 3 | – | 8 | – | 0 |
| Wichita State | | – | | – | | 3 | – | 8 | – | 0 |
| East Carolina | | – | | – | | 2 | – | 9 | – | 0 |
| Northern Illinois | | – | | – | | 2 | – | 9 | – | 0 |
| Memphis State | | – | | – | | 1 | – | 10 | – | 0 |
Rankings from AP Poll

The 1986 Temple Owls football team was an American football team that represented Temple University as an independent during the 1986 NCAA Division I-A football season. In its fourth season under head coach Bruce Arians, the team compiled a 6–5 record and outscored opponents by a total of 308 to 271. The team played its home games at Veterans Stadium in Philadelphia.

The team's statistical leaders included Lee Saltz with 1,729 passing yards, Paul Palmer with 1,866 rushing yards and 90 points scored, and Keith Gloster with 568 receiving yards.

== Schedule ==
| Date | Opponent | Site | Result | Attendance | Source |
|---|---|---|---|---|---|
| September 6 | at No. 6 Penn State | Beaver Stadium; University Park, PA | L 15–45 | 85,732 | |
| September 13 | at Western Michigan | Waldo Stadium; Kalamazoo, MI | W 49–17 | 10,159 | |
| September 20 | Florida A&M | Veterans Stadium; Philadelphia, PA | W 38–17 | 42,098 | |
| September 27 | at BYU | Cougar Stadium; Provo, UT | L 17–27 | 64,221 | |
| October 4 | at Pittsburgh | Pitt Stadium; Pittsburgh, PA | W 19–13 | 40,136 | |
| October 11 | East Carolina | Veterans Stadium; Philadelphia, PA | W 45–28 | 15,384 | |
| October 18 | vs. Virginia Tech | Foreman Field; Norfolk, VA | W 29–13 | 23,500 | |
| October 25 | Syracuse | Veterans Stadium; Philadelphia, PA | L 24–27 | 19,422 | |
| November 8 | Boston College | Veterans Stadium; Philadelphia | L 29–38 | 17,952 | |
| November 15 | at No. 11 Alabama | Bryant–Denny Stadium; Tuscaloosa, AL | L 14–24 | 60,210 | |
| November 22 | at Rutgers | Rutgers Stadium; Piscataway, NJ | W 29–22 | 24,386 | |
Rankings from AP Poll released prior to the game

== Roster ==
1986 Temple Owls football team roster
Players
Coaches
Offense

| Pos. | # | Name | Class |
|---|---|---|---|
| WR | 40 | Andy Garczynski | Jr |
| TE | 86 | Mike Hinnant | Jr |
| WR | 84 | Willie Marshall | Sr |
| RB | 34 | Todd McNair | So |
| RB | 6 | Paul Palmer | Sr |
| QB | 11 | Lee Saltz | Sr |

Defense

| Pos. | # | Name | Class |
|---|---|---|---|
| LB | 54 | Steve Domonoski | Sr |
| DE | 98 | Ralph Jarvis | Jr |
| DB | 27 | Terry Wright | Sr |

Special teams

| Pos. | # | Name | Class |

Head coach

- Bruce Arians

Coordinators/assistant coaches

Legend

- (C) Team captain
- (S) Suspended
- (I) Ineligible
- Injured
- Redshirt
