= 1986 Tulsa Golden Hurricane football team =

American college football season

1986 Tulsa Golden Hurricane football
- Conference: Independent
- Record: 7–4
- Head coach: Don Morton (2nd season)
- Defensive coordinator: Mike Daly (2nd season)
- Home stadium: Skelly Stadium

1986 NCAA Division I-A independents football records
	Conf.					Overall
Team	W		L		T	W		L		T
No. 1 Penn State		–		–		12	–	0	–	0
No. 2 Miami (FL)		–		–		11	–	1	–	0
No. 20 Virginia Tech		–		–		9	–	2	–	1
No. 19 Boston College		–		–		9	–	3	–	0
Tulsa		–		–		7	–	4	–	0
Florida State		–		–		7	–	4	–	1
Army		–		–		6	–	5	–	0
Southwestern Louisiana		–		–		6	–	5	–	0
Southern Miss		–		–		6	–	5	–	0
Temple		–		–		6	–	5	–	0
Pittsburgh		–		–		5	–	5	–	1
Rutgers		–		–		5	–	5	–	1
Cincinnati		–		–		5	–	6	–	0
Notre Dame		–		–		5	–	6	–	0
Syracuse		–		–		5	–	6	–	0
South Carolina		–		–		3	–	6	–	2
Tulane		–		–		4	–	7	–	0
West Virginia		–		–		4	–	7	–	0
Louisville		–		–		3	–	8	–	0
Navy		–		–		3	–	8	–	0
Wichita State		–		–		3	–	8	–	0
East Carolina		–		–		2	–	9	–	0
Northern Illinois		–		–		2	–	9	–	0
Memphis State		–		–		1	–	10	–	0
Rankings from AP Poll

The 1986 Tulsa Golden Hurricane football team represented the University of Tulsa as an independent during the 1986 NCAA Division I-A football season. In their first year under head coach Don Morton, the Golden Hurricane compiled a 7–4 record. The team's statistical leaders included quarterback Steve Gage with 1,090 passing yards, Derrick Ellison with 1,064 rushing yards, and Ronnie Kelly with 533 receiving yards.

== Schedule ==
Date	Opponent	Site	TV	Result	Attendance	Source
August 30	No. 11 (I-AA) Louisiana Tech	Skelly Stadium; Tulsa, OK		L 17–22	25,667	
September 6	Tennessee Tech	Skelly Stadium; Tulsa, OK		W 51–0	10,466	
September 13	Oklahoma State	Skelly Stadium; Tulsa, OK (rivalry)		W 27–23	41,235	
September 20	at No. 12 Arkansas	Razorback Stadium; Fayetteville, AR		L 17–34	51,080	
September 27	at Houston	Houston Astrodome; Houston, TX		W 24–14	12,445	
October 2	Cal State Fullerton	Skelly Stadium; Tulsa, OK	ESPN	W 20–10	11,988	
October 11	at Southwestern Louisiana	Cajun Field; Lafayette, LA		L 13–17	22,031	
October 18	Central Michigan	Skelly Stadium; Tulsa, OK		W 42–6	10,876	
November 1	Wichita State^{†}	Skelly Stadium; Tulsa, OK		W 38–10	12,437	
November 8	at New Mexico	University Stadium; Albuquerque, NM		W 34–27	11,372	
November 15	at No. 1 Miami (FL)	Miami Orange Bowl; Miami, FL		L 10–23	51,110	
^{†}Homecoming; Rankings from AP Poll released prior to the game

== After the season ==
=== 1987 NFL draft ===
The following Golden Hurricane players were selected in the 1987 NFL draft following the season.

Round	Pick	Player	Position	NFL club
5	121	David Alexander	Center	Philadelphia Eagles
6	144	Steve Gage	Defensive back	Washington Redskins
6	158	Chris Pike	Defensive tackle	Philadelphia Eagles
10	257	Charles Wright	Defensive back	St. Louis Cardinals
