= 1986 Wichita State Shockers football team =

Season of Wichita State University team

1986 Wichita State Shockers football
- Conference: Independent
- Record: 3–8
- Head coach: Ron Chismar (3rd season)
- Offensive coordinator: Fayne Henson (5th season)
- Offensive scheme: Pro-style
- Defensive coordinator: Wayne Donner (3rd season)
- Base defense: 5–2
- Home stadium: Cessna Stadium

1986 NCAA Division I-A independents football records
	Conf.					Overall
Team	W		L		T	W		L		T
No. 1 Penn State		–		–		12	–	0	–	0
No. 2 Miami (FL)		–		–		11	–	1	–	0
No. 20 Virginia Tech		–		–		9	–	2	–	1
No. 19 Boston College		–		–		9	–	3	–	0
Tulsa		–		–		7	–	4	–	0
Florida State		–		–		7	–	4	–	1
Army		–		–		6	–	5	–	0
Southwestern Louisiana		–		–		6	–	5	–	0
Southern Miss		–		–		6	–	5	–	0
Temple		–		–		6	–	5	–	0
Pittsburgh		–		–		5	–	5	–	1
Rutgers		–		–		5	–	5	–	1
Cincinnati		–		–		5	–	6	–	0
Notre Dame		–		–		5	–	6	–	0
Syracuse		–		–		5	–	6	–	0
South Carolina		–		–		3	–	6	–	2
Tulane		–		–		4	–	7	–	0
West Virginia		–		–		4	–	7	–	0
Louisville		–		–		3	–	8	–	0
Navy		–		–		3	–	8	–	0
Wichita State		–		–		3	–	8	–	0
East Carolina		–		–		2	–	9	–	0
Northern Illinois		–		–		2	–	9	–	0
Memphis State		–		–		1	–	10	–	0
Rankings from AP Poll

The 1986 Wichita State Shockers football team represented Wichita State University in the 1986 NCAA Division I-A football season. The Shockers competed as an independent program and played their home games at Cessna Stadium. It was the Shockers 90th and final season. The team, coached by Ron Chismar, went 3–8 and announced on December 2 that the team's 1986 season would be its last. University officials cited financial issues and lack of success as two of many factors leading to the program's termination. The 1970 plane crash involving the Shockers football team, in which only nine of 37 passengers survived, also played a role in the shuttering of the program.

== Schedule ==
Date	Opponent	Site	Result	Attendance	Source
September 6	San Francisco State	Cessna Stadium; Wichita, KS	W 69–6	18,836	
September 13	at Toledo	Glass Bowl; Toledo, OH	L 13–30	19,146	
September 20	Morehead State	Cessna Stadium; Wichita, KS	L 35–36	13,252	
September 27	at Iowa State	Jack Trice Stadium; Ames, IA	L 14–36	35,212	
October 4	at Tulane	Louisiana Superdome; New Orleans, LA	W 21–20	24,481	
October 11	UCF	Cessna Stadium; Wichita, KS	W 9–6	4,167	
October 18	at Florida State	Doak Campbell Stadium; Tallahassee, FL	L 3–59	56,222	
October 25	Cincinnati	Cessna Stadium; Wichita, KS	L 19–24	8,411	
November 1	at Tulsa	Skelly Stadium; Tulsa, OK	L 10–38	12,437	
November 8	Illinois State	Cessna Stadium; Wichita, Kansas	L 10–17	4,233	
November 15	at No. 5 Arizona State	Sun Devil Stadium; Tempe, AZ	L 6–52	65,333	
Rankings from AP Poll released prior to the game
