= Dan Morgan (offensive lineman) =

American football player (born 1964)

No. 61
- Position: Guard

Personal information
- Born: February 2, 1964 (age 62); Wheeling, West Virginia, U.S.
- Listed height: 6 ft 6 in (1.98 m)
- Listed weight: 285 lb (129 kg)

Career information
- High school: St. Clairsville (St. Clairsville, Ohio)
- College: Penn State
- NFL draft: 1987: 8th round, 222nd overall pick

Career history
- Denver Broncos (1987)*; Detroit Lions (1987)*; Philadelphia Eagles (1987)*; New York Giants (1987)
- * Offseason or practice squad member only

Awards and highlights
- National champion (1986); Second-team All-East (1986)

Career NFL statistics
- Games played: 2
- Games started: 2
- Stats at Pro Football Reference

Daniel Scott Morgan (born February 2, 1964) is an American former professional football player who was a guard in the National Football League (NFL). He was selected by the Denver Broncos in the eighth round of the 1987 NFL draft with the 222nd overall pick. He played two games for the New York Giants in 1987. He played college football for the Penn State Nittany Lions.

Pre-draft measurables
Height	Weight	Arm length	Hand span	40-yard dash	10-yard split	20-yard split	20-yard shuttle	Vertical jump	Broad jump	Bench press
6 ft 6 1/4 in (1.99 m)	288 lb (131 kg)	31 3/4 in (0.81 m)	8 1/2 in (0.22 m)	5.25 s	1.79 s	3.04 s	4.84 s	25.0 in (0.64 m)	7 ft 9 in (2.36 m)	14 reps
All values from NFL Combine
