= 1986 Cincinnati Bearcats football team =

American college football season

1986 Cincinnati Bearcats football
- Conference: Independent
- Record: 5–6
- Head coach: Dave Currey (3rd season)
- Home stadium: Riverfront Stadium, Nippert Stadium

1986 NCAA Division I-A independents football records
	Conf.					Overall
Team	W		L		T	W		L		T
No. 1 Penn State		–		–		12	–	0	–	0
No. 2 Miami (FL)		–		–		11	–	1	–	0
No. 20 Virginia Tech		–		–		9	–	2	–	1
No. 19 Boston College		–		–		9	–	3	–	0
Tulsa		–		–		7	–	4	–	0
Florida State		–		–		7	–	4	–	1
Army		–		–		6	–	5	–	0
Southwestern Louisiana		–		–		6	–	5	–	0
Southern Miss		–		–		6	–	5	–	0
Temple		–		–		6	–	5	–	0
Pittsburgh		–		–		5	–	5	–	1
Rutgers		–		–		5	–	5	–	1
Cincinnati		–		–		5	–	6	–	0
Notre Dame		–		–		5	–	6	–	0
Syracuse		–		–		5	–	6	–	0
South Carolina		–		–		3	–	6	–	2
Tulane		–		–		4	–	7	–	0
West Virginia		–		–		4	–	7	–	0
Louisville		–		–		3	–	8	–	0
Navy		–		–		3	–	8	–	0
Wichita State		–		–		3	–	8	–	0
East Carolina		–		–		2	–	9	–	0
Northern Illinois		–		–		2	–	9	–	0
Memphis State		–		–		1	–	10	–	0
Rankings from AP Poll

The 1986 Cincinnati Bearcats football team represented the University of Cincinnati during the 1986 NCAA Division I-A football season. The Bearcats, led by head coach Dave Currey, participated as independent and played their home games at Riverfront Stadium. On-campus Nippert Stadium was used as a supplement.

== Schedule ==
Date	Opponent	Site	Result	Attendance	Source
September 6	at Virginia Tech	Lane Stadium; Blacksburg, VA	W 24–20	22,700	
September 13	Miami (OH)	Riverfront Stadium; Cincinnati, OH (Victory Bell)	W 45–38	23,709	
September 20	at Rutgers	Rutgers Stadium; Piscataway, NJ	L 28–48	27,249	
September 27	Kentucky	Riverfront Stadium; Cincinnati, OH	L 20–37	36,233	
October 4	Louisville	Nippert Stadium; Cincinnati, OH (The Keg of Nails)	W 24–17	16,317	
October 11	at No. 5 Penn State	Beaver Stadium; University Park, PA	L 17–23	84,812	
October 18	No. 1 Miami (FL)	Nippert Stadium; Cincinnati, OH	L 13–45	29,546	
October 25	at Wichita State	Cessna Stadium; Wichita, KS	W 24–19	8,411	
November 1	Indiana State	Nippert Stadium; Cincinnati, OH	W 46–14	19,369	
November 8	at No. 9 Auburn	Jordan-Hare Stadium; Auburn, AL	L 7–52	63,500	
November 15	at East Carolina	Dowdy–Ficklen Stadium; Greenville, NC	L 19–32	16,258	
Rankings from AP Poll released prior to the game
