= 1986 Southwestern Louisiana Ragin' Cajuns football team =

American college football season

1986 Southwestern Louisiana Ragin' Cajuns football
- Conference: Independent
- Record: 6–5
- Head coach: Nelson Stokley (1st season)
- Defensive coordinator: Ron West (1st season)
- Home stadium: Cajun Field

1986 NCAA Division I-A independents football records
| | Conf. | | | | | Overall |
| Team | W | | L | | T | W | | L | | T |
|---|---|---|---|---|---|---|---|---|---|---|
| No. 1 Penn State | | – | | – | | 12 | – | 0 | – | 0 |
| No. 2 Miami (FL) | | – | | – | | 11 | – | 1 | – | 0 |
| No. 20 Virginia Tech | | – | | – | | 9 | – | 2 | – | 1 |
| No. 19 Boston College | | – | | – | | 9 | – | 3 | – | 0 |
| Tulsa | | – | | – | | 7 | – | 4 | – | 0 |
| Florida State | | – | | – | | 7 | – | 4 | – | 1 |
| Army | | – | | – | | 6 | – | 5 | – | 0 |
| Southwestern Louisiana | | – | | – | | 6 | – | 5 | – | 0 |
| Southern Miss | | – | | – | | 6 | – | 5 | – | 0 |
| Temple | | – | | – | | 6 | – | 5 | – | 0 |
| Pittsburgh | | – | | – | | 5 | – | 5 | – | 1 |
| Rutgers | | – | | – | | 5 | – | 5 | – | 1 |
| Cincinnati | | – | | – | | 5 | – | 6 | – | 0 |
| Notre Dame | | – | | – | | 5 | – | 6 | – | 0 |
| Syracuse | | – | | – | | 5 | – | 6 | – | 0 |
| South Carolina | | – | | – | | 3 | – | 6 | – | 2 |
| Tulane | | – | | – | | 4 | – | 7 | – | 0 |
| West Virginia | | – | | – | | 4 | – | 7 | – | 0 |
| Louisville | | – | | – | | 3 | – | 8 | – | 0 |
| Navy | | – | | – | | 3 | – | 8 | – | 0 |
| Wichita State | | – | | – | | 3 | – | 8 | – | 0 |
| East Carolina | | – | | – | | 2 | – | 9 | – | 0 |
| Northern Illinois | | – | | – | | 2 | – | 9 | – | 0 |
| Memphis State | | – | | – | | 1 | – | 10 | – | 0 |
Rankings from AP Poll

The 1986 Southwestern Louisiana Ragin' Cajuns football team was an American football team that represented the University of Southwestern Louisiana (now known as the University of Louisiana at Lafayette) as an independent during the 1986 NCAA Division I-A football season. In their first year under head coach Nelson Stokley, the team compiled a 6–5 record.

== Schedule ==
| Date | Opponent | Site | Result | Attendance | Source |
|---|---|---|---|---|---|
| September 6 | Oklahoma State | Cajun Field; Lafayette, LA | L 20–21 | 23,144 | |
| September 13 | Northeast Louisiana | Cajun Field; Lafayette, LA (rivalry) | W 24–20 | | |
| September 20 | at Memphis State | Liberty Bowl Memorial Stadium; Memphis, TN | W 26–10 | 22,944 | |
| October 4 | at East Carolina | Ficklen Memorial Stadium; Greenville, NC | W 21–10 | 27,726 | |
| October 11 | Tulsa | Cajun Field; Lafayette, LA | W 17–13 | 22,031 | |
| October 18 | at Ole Miss | Vaught–Hemingway Stadium; Oxford, MS | L 20–21 | 33,500 | |
| October 25 | Stephen F. Austin | Cajun Field; Lafayette, LA | W 28–14 | 23,257 | |
| November 1 | at Tulane | Louisiana Superdome; New Orleans, LA | L 39–42 | 44,132 | |
| November 8 | at Southern Miss | M. M. Roberts Stadium; Hattiesburg, MS | L 0–17 | 14,512 | |
| November 15 | at McNeese State | Cowboy Stadium; Lake Charles, LA (Cajun Crown) | W 33–13 | 18,353 | |
| November 22 | Louisiana Tech | Cajun Field; Lafayette, LA (rivalry) | L 14–23 | 15,780 | |
