= 1986 East Carolina Pirates football team =

American college football season

1986 East Carolina Pirates football
- Conference: Independent
- Record: 3–8
- Head coach: Art Baker (2nd season)
- Defensive coordinator: Don Powers (2nd season)
- Home stadium: Ficklen Memorial Stadium

1986 NCAA Division I-A independents football records
	Conf.					Overall
Team	W		L		T	W		L		T
No. 1 Penn State		–		–		12	–	0	–	0
No. 2 Miami (FL)		–		–		11	–	1	–	0
No. 20 Virginia Tech		–		–		9	–	2	–	1
No. 19 Boston College		–		–		9	–	3	–	0
Tulsa		–		–		7	–	4	–	0
Florida State		–		–		7	–	4	–	1
Army		–		–		6	–	5	–	0
Southwestern Louisiana		–		–		6	–	5	–	0
Southern Miss		–		–		6	–	5	–	0
Temple		–		–		6	–	5	–	0
Pittsburgh		–		–		5	–	5	–	1
Rutgers		–		–		5	–	5	–	1
Cincinnati		–		–		5	–	6	–	0
Notre Dame		–		–		5	–	6	–	0
Syracuse		–		–		5	–	6	–	0
South Carolina		–		–		3	–	6	–	2
Tulane		–		–		4	–	7	–	0
West Virginia		–		–		4	–	7	–	0
Louisville		–		–		3	–	8	–	0
Navy		–		–		3	–	8	–	0
Wichita State		–		–		3	–	8	–	0
East Carolina		–		–		2	–	9	–	0
Northern Illinois		–		–		2	–	9	–	0
Memphis State		–		–		1	–	10	–	0
Rankings from AP Poll

The 1986 East Carolina Pirates football team was an American football team that represented East Carolina University as an independent during the 1986 NCAA Division I-A football season. In their second season under head coach Art Baker, the team compiled a 3–8 record.

== Schedule ==
Date	Opponent	Site	TV	Result	Attendance	Source
September 6	at NC State	Carter–Finley Stadium; Raleigh, NC (rivalry)		L 10–38	58,650	
September 13	West Virginia	Ficklen Memorial Stadium; Greenville, NC	WITN	L 21–24	33,857	
September 20	at No. 10 Auburn	Jordan–Hare Stadium; Auburn, AL		L 0–45	62,000	
September 27	at No. 7 Penn State	Beaver Stadium; University Park, PA		L 17–42	84,774	
October 4	Southwestern Louisiana	Ficklen Memorial Stadium; Greenville, NC		L 10–21	27,726	
October 11	at Temple	Veterans Stadium; Philadelphia, PA		W 28–45 (forfeit win)	15,384	
October 18	Georgia Southern	Ficklen Memorial Stadium; Greenville, NC		W 35–33	27,121	
October 25	at South Carolina	Williams–Brice Stadium; Columbia, SC		L 3–38	68,327	
November 1	Southern Miss	Ficklen Memorial Stadium; Greenville, NC		L 21–23	18,127	
November 15	Cincinnati	Ficklen Memorial Stadium; Greenville, NC		W 32–19	16,258	
November 27	at No. 1 Miami (FL)	Miami Orange Bowl; Miami, FL	TBS	L 10–36	30,202	
Rankings from AP Poll released prior to the game

== Roster ==
1986 East Carolina Pirates football team roster
Players
Coaches
Offense

Pos.	#	Name	Class
OL	73	John O'Driscoll	Jr

Defense

Pos.	#	Name	Class
S	19	Ellis Dillahunt	Jr
LB	44	Vinson Smith	Jr

Special teams

Pos.	#	Name	Class

Head coach

- Don Powers

Coordinators/assistant coaches

Legend

- (C) Team captain
- (S) Suspended
- (I) Ineligible
- Injured
- Redshirt
