= 1986 West Virginia Mountaineers football team =

American college football season

1986 West Virginia Mountaineers football
- Conference: Independent
- Record: 4–7
- Head coach: Don Nehlen (7th season)
- Home stadium: Mountaineer Field

1986 Major eastern college football independents records
	Conf.					Overall
Team	W		L		T	W		L		T
No. 1 Penn State $	6	–	0	–	0	12	–	0	–	0
No. 19 Boston College	3	–	2	–	0	9	–	3	–	0
Syracuse	3	–	3	–	0	5	–	6	–	0
Temple	2	–	3	–	0	6	–	5	–	0
Pittsburgh	2	–	3	–	0	5	–	5	–	1
Rutgers	2	–	4	–	0	5	–	5	–	1
West Virginia	1	–	4	–	0	4	–	7	–	0
$ – Lambert Trophy Winner; Rankings from AP Poll

1986 NCAA Division I-A independents football records
	Conf.					Overall
Team	W		L		T	W		L		T
No. 1 Penn State		–		–		12	–	0	–	0
No. 2 Miami (FL)		–		–		11	–	1	–	0
No. 20 Virginia Tech		–		–		9	–	2	–	1
No. 19 Boston College		–		–		9	–	3	–	0
Tulsa		–		–		7	–	4	–	0
Florida State		–		–		7	–	4	–	1
Army		–		–		6	–	5	–	0
Southwestern Louisiana		–		–		6	–	5	–	0
Southern Miss		–		–		6	–	5	–	0
Temple		–		–		6	–	5	–	0
Pittsburgh		–		–		5	–	5	–	1
Rutgers		–		–		5	–	5	–	1
Cincinnati		–		–		5	–	6	–	0
Notre Dame		–		–		5	–	6	–	0
Syracuse		–		–		5	–	6	–	0
South Carolina		–		–		3	–	6	–	2
Tulane		–		–		4	–	7	–	0
West Virginia		–		–		4	–	7	–	0
Louisville		–		–		3	–	8	–	0
Navy		–		–		3	–	8	–	0
Wichita State		–		–		3	–	8	–	0
East Carolina		–		–		2	–	9	–	0
Northern Illinois		–		–		2	–	9	–	0
Memphis State		–		–		1	–	10	–	0
Rankings from AP Poll

The 1986 West Virginia Mountaineers football team represented West Virginia University as an independent during the 1986 NCAA Division I-A football season. Led by seventh-year head coach Don Nehlen, the Mountaineers compiled a record of 4–7. West Virginia played home games at Mountaineer Field in Morgantown, West Virginia.

== Schedule ==
Date	Opponent	Site	Result	Attendance	Source
September 6	Northern Illinois	Mountaineer Field; Morgantown, WV	W 47–14	56,665	
September 13	at East Carolina	Ficklen Memorial Stadium; Greenville, NC	W 24–21	33,857	
September 20	Maryland	Mountaineer Field; Morgantown, WV (rivalry)	L 3–24	63,500	
September 27	at Pittsburgh	Three Rivers Stadium; Pittsburgh, PA (Backyard Brawl)	L 16–48	55,129	
October 4	at Virginia Tech	Lane Stadium; Blacksburg, VA (rivalry)	L 7–13	50,000	
October 11	No. 1 Miami (FL)	Mountaineer Field; Morgantown, WV	L 14–58	63,500	
October 25	Boston College	Mountaineer Field; Morgantown, WV	L 10–19	47,760	
November 1	No. 2 Penn State	Mountaineer Field; Morgantown, WV (rivalry)	L 0–19	59,184	
November 8	at Rutgers	Giants Stadium; East Rutherford, NJ	W 24–17	15,101	
November 15	at Louisville	Cardinal Stadium; Louisville, KY	W 42–19	21,834	
November 22	Syracuse	Mountaineer Field; Morgantown, WV (rivalry)	L 23–34	40,106	
Rankings from AP Poll released prior to the game

== Roster ==
1986 West Virginia Mountaineers football team roster
Players
Coaches
Offense

Pos.	#	Name	Class
WR	1	Grantis Bell	Fr
RB	3	John Holifield	Sr
WR	7	John Talley	Jr
QB	13	Ben Reed	Jr
QB	17	Mike Timko	Jr
FB	20	Craig Taylor	So
G	75	John Stroia	So
OT	79	Brian Smider	So
TE	81	Keith Winn	So
WR	82	Calvin Phillips	So
TE	83	Gary Basil	Jr

Defense

Pos.	#	Name	Class
DB	22	Pete Bejadhar	Fr
DT	61	Mike Fox	Fr
DE	87	Renaldo Turnbull	Fr
DT	98	David Grant	Jr
DT	99	Jeff Lucas	Sr

Special teams

Pos.	#	Name	Class
K	8	Charlie Baumann	So

Head coach

- Don Nehlen

Coordinators/assistant coaches

Legend

- (C) Team captain
- (S) Suspended
- (I) Ineligible
- Injured
- Redshirt
