= 1986 Pittsburgh Panthers football team =

American college football season

1986 Pittsburgh Panthers football
- Conference: Independent
- Record: 5–5–1
- Head coach: Mike Gottfried (1st season)
- Offensive coordinator: Mike Solari (1st season)
- Offensive scheme: Run and shoot, multiple pro-style
- Defensive coordinator: John Fox (1st season)
- Base defense: 4–3
- Home stadium: Pitt Stadium

1986 Major eastern college football independents records
	Conf.					Overall
Team	W		L		T	W		L		T
No. 1 Penn State $	6	–	0	–	0	12	–	0	–	0
No. 19 Boston College	3	–	2	–	0	9	–	3	–	0
Syracuse	3	–	3	–	0	5	–	6	–	0
Temple	2	–	3	–	0	6	–	5	–	0
Pittsburgh	2	–	3	–	0	5	–	5	–	1
Rutgers	2	–	4	–	0	5	–	5	–	1
West Virginia	1	–	4	–	0	4	–	7	–	0
$ – Lambert Trophy Winner; Rankings from AP Poll

1986 NCAA Division I-A independents football records
	Conf.					Overall
Team	W		L		T	W		L		T
No. 1 Penn State		–		–		12	–	0	–	0
No. 2 Miami (FL)		–		–		11	–	1	–	0
No. 20 Virginia Tech		–		–		9	–	2	–	1
No. 19 Boston College		–		–		9	–	3	–	0
Tulsa		–		–		7	–	4	–	0
Florida State		–		–		7	–	4	–	1
Army		–		–		6	–	5	–	0
Southwestern Louisiana		–		–		6	–	5	–	0
Southern Miss		–		–		6	–	5	–	0
Temple		–		–		6	–	5	–	0
Pittsburgh		–		–		5	–	5	–	1
Rutgers		–		–		5	–	5	–	1
Cincinnati		–		–		5	–	6	–	0
Notre Dame		–		–		5	–	6	–	0
Syracuse		–		–		5	–	6	–	0
South Carolina		–		–		3	–	6	–	2
Tulane		–		–		4	–	7	–	0
West Virginia		–		–		4	–	7	–	0
Louisville		–		–		3	–	8	–	0
Navy		–		–		3	–	8	–	0
Wichita State		–		–		3	–	8	–	0
East Carolina		–		–		2	–	9	–	0
Northern Illinois		–		–		2	–	9	–	0
Memphis State		–		–		1	–	10	–	0
Rankings from AP Poll

The 1986 Pittsburgh Panthers football team represented the University of Pittsburgh as an independent in the sport of American football during the 1986 NCAA Division I-A football season.

== Schedule ==
Date	Time	Opponent	Site	TV	Result	Attendance	Source
September 1	8:00 p.m.	Maryland	Pitt Stadium; Pittsburgh, PA	ESPN	L 7–10	48,120	
September 13	7:00 p.m.	at NC State	Carter–Finley Stadium; Raleigh, NC		T 14–14	47,200	
September 20	12:30 p.m.	at Purdue	Ross–Ade Stadium; West Lafayette, IN	TNT	W 41–26	55,621	
September 27	12:00 p.m.	West Virginia	Pitt Stadium; Pittsburgh, PA (Backyard Brawl)	T.E.N.	W 48–16	55,129	
October 4	7:00 p.m.	Temple	Pitt Stadium; Pittsburgh, PA		L 13–19	40,136	
October 11	12:30 p.m.	at Notre Dame	Notre Dame Stadium; Notre Dame, IN (rivalry)	USA	W 10–9	59,075	
October 25	1:30 p.m.	Navy^{†}	Pitt Stadium; Pittsburgh, PA		W 56–14	45,345	
November 1	12:00 p.m.	at Syracuse	Carrier Dome; Syracuse, NY (rivalry)	T.V.E.N.	L 20–24	34,114	
November 8	3:30 p.m.	No. 1 Miami (FL)	Pitt Stadium; Pittsburgh, PA	ABC	L 10–37	55,338	
November 15	1:30 p.m.	Rutgers	Pitt Stadium; Pittsburgh, PA		W 20–6	34,922	
November 22	12:00 p.m.	at No. 2 Penn State	Beaver Stadium; University Park, PA (rivalry)	USA	L 14–34	85,722	
^{†}Homecoming; Rankings from AP Poll released prior to the game; All times are in Eastern time

== Coaching staff ==
1986 Pittsburgh Panthers football staff
Coaching staff: Mike Gottfried – Head coach; Chuck Klausing – Assistant head coach/outside linebackers; John Fox – Defensive coordinator/defensive Backfield; Mike Solari – Offensive coordinator/offensive line; Carl Angelo – Defensive line; Steve Coury – Wide receivers; Frank D'Alonzo – Defensive ends; Mike Dickens – Quarterbacks; Tommie Liggins – Running backs; Sal Sunseri – Linebackers	Support staff: Alex Kramer – Administrative assistant; Bud Ratliff – Recruiting coordinator; John Brown – Graduate assistant; Rick Denstorff – Graduate assistant; John Kukalis – Graduate assistant; Larry Petroff – Graduate assistant	Strength and conditioning staff: Buddy Morris – Weight training coordinator; Ray Oliver – Assistant Strength

== Team players drafted into the NFL ==
Player	Position	Round	Pick	NFL club
Tony Woods	Defensive end	1	18	Seattle Seahawks
Randy Dixon	Guard	4	85	Indianapolis Colts
Lorenzo Freeman	Nose Tackle	4	89	Green Bay Packers
Tom Brown	Running back	7	182	Miami Dolphins
