= 1986 Notre Dame Fighting Irish football team =

American college football season

1986 Notre Dame Fighting Irish football
- Conference: Independent
- Record: 5–6
- Head coach: Lou Holtz (1st season)
- Offensive scheme: Wishbone triple option
- Defensive coordinator: Foge Fazio (1st season)
- Base defense: 4–3
- MVP: Tim Brown
- Captain: Mike Kovaleski
- Home stadium: Notre Dame Stadium

1986 NCAA Division I-A independents football records
| | Conf. | | | | | Overall |
| Team | W | | L | | T | W | | L | | T |
|---|---|---|---|---|---|---|---|---|---|---|
| No. 1 Penn State | | – | | – | | 12 | – | 0 | – | 0 |
| No. 2 Miami (FL) | | – | | – | | 11 | – | 1 | – | 0 |
| No. 20 Virginia Tech | | – | | – | | 9 | – | 2 | – | 1 |
| No. 19 Boston College | | – | | – | | 9 | – | 3 | – | 0 |
| Tulsa | | – | | – | | 7 | – | 4 | – | 0 |
| Florida State | | – | | – | | 7 | – | 4 | – | 1 |
| Army | | – | | – | | 6 | – | 5 | – | 0 |
| Southwestern Louisiana | | – | | – | | 6 | – | 5 | – | 0 |
| Southern Miss | | – | | – | | 6 | – | 5 | – | 0 |
| Temple | | – | | – | | 6 | – | 5 | – | 0 |
| Pittsburgh | | – | | – | | 5 | – | 5 | – | 1 |
| Rutgers | | – | | – | | 5 | – | 5 | – | 1 |
| Cincinnati | | – | | – | | 5 | – | 6 | – | 0 |
| Notre Dame | | – | | – | | 5 | – | 6 | – | 0 |
| Syracuse | | – | | – | | 5 | – | 6 | – | 0 |
| South Carolina | | – | | – | | 3 | – | 6 | – | 2 |
| Tulane | | – | | – | | 4 | – | 7 | – | 0 |
| West Virginia | | – | | – | | 4 | – | 7 | – | 0 |
| Louisville | | – | | – | | 3 | – | 8 | – | 0 |
| Navy | | – | | – | | 3 | – | 8 | – | 0 |
| Wichita State | | – | | – | | 3 | – | 8 | – | 0 |
| East Carolina | | – | | – | | 2 | – | 9 | – | 0 |
| Northern Illinois | | – | | – | | 2 | – | 9 | – | 0 |
| Memphis State | | – | | – | | 1 | – | 10 | – | 0 |
Rankings from AP Poll

The 1986 Notre Dame Fighting Irish football team was an American football team that represented the University of Notre Dame as an independent during the 1986 NCAA Division I-A football season. In their first year under head coach Lou Holtz, the Irish compiled a 5–6 record, outscored opponents by a total of 299 to 219, and were unranked for the sixth consecutive year in the final AP and UPI polls.

Wide receiver Tim Brown received first-team honors from, among others, the Associated Press and United Press International on the 1986 All-America college football team. The team's statistical leaders included quarterback Steve Beuerlein (2,211 passing yards), running back Mark Green (406 rushing yards, 66 points scored), Tim Brown (45 receptions, 910 receiving yards, 698 yards and two touchdowns on 25 kickoff returns), kicker John Carney (87 points scored, 24 of 26 PAT, 21 of 28 field goals), and linebacker Mike Kovaleski (88 tackles).

The team played its home games at Notre Dame Stadium in Notre Dame, Indiana.

== Schedule ==
| Date | Time | Opponent | Rank | Site | TV | Result | Attendance | Source |
|---|---|---|---|---|---|---|---|---|
| September 13 | 3:30 p.m. | No. 3 Michigan | | Notre Dame Stadium; Notre Dame, IN (rivalry) | ABC | L 23–24 | 59,075 | |
| September 20 | 2:30 p.m. | at Michigan State | No. 20 | Spartan Stadium; East Lansing, MI (rivalry) | CBS | L 15–20 | 79,895 | |
| September 27 | 3:30 p.m. | Purdue | | Notre Dame Stadium; Notre Dame, IN (rivalry) | ABC | W 41–9 | 59,075 | |
| October 4 | 3:30 p.m. | at No. 2 Alabama | | Legion Field; Birmingham, AL | ABC | L 10–28 | 75,808 | |
| October 11 | 12:30 p.m. | Pittsburgh | | Notre Dame Stadium; Notre Dame, IN (rivalry) | USA, WGN | L 9–10 | 59,075 | |
| October 18 | 12:30 p.m. | Air Force | | Notre Dame Stadium; Notre Dame, IN (rivalry) | USA, WGN | W 31–3 | 59,075 | |
| November 1 | 7:00 p.m. | at Navy | | Memorial Stadium; Baltimore, MD (rivalry) | TBS | W 33–14 | 61,335 | |
| November 8 | 1:00 p.m. | SMU | | Notre Dame Stadium; Notre Dame, IN | | W 61–29 | 59,075 | |
| November 15 | 3:30 p.m. | No. 3 Penn State | | Notre Dame Stadium; Notre Dame, IN (rivalry) | ABC | L 19–24 | 59,075 | |
| November 22 | 7:30 p.m. | at No. 8 LSU | | Tiger Stadium; Baton Rouge, LA | ESPN | L 19–21 | 78,197 | |
| November 29 | 3:30 p.m. | at No. 17 USC | | Los Angeles Memorial Coliseum; Los Angeles, CA (rivalry) | CBS | W 38–37 | 70,614 | |
Rankings from AP Poll released prior to the game; All times are in Eastern time

== Game summaries ==
=== Michigan ===
Week 1: Michigan at Notre Dame

| Team | 1 | 2 | 3 | 4 | Total |
|---|---|---|---|---|---|
| • Michigan | 7 | 3 | 14 | 0 | 24 |
| Notre Dame | 7 | 7 | 6 | 3 | 23 |

- Date: September 13
- Location: South Bend, IN
- Game start: 3:30 p.m.
- Game attendance: 59,075
- TV announcers (ABC): Keith Jackson, Tim Brant, Al Trautwig

Scoring summary
| 1 | 4:34 | ND | Tim Brown 3-yard run (John Carney kick) | ND 7–0 |
| 1 | 0:33 | MICH | Jamie Morris 8-yard run (Pat Moons kick) | TIE 7–7 |
| 2 | 8:08 | ND | Mark Green 1-yard run (Carney kick) | ND 14–7 |
| 2 | 0:52 | MICH | Moons 23-yard field goal | ND 14–10 |
| 3 | 8:57 | MICH | Morris 1-yard run (Moons kick) | MICH 17–14 |
| 3 | 8:51 | MICH | Morris 27-yard pass from Jim Harbaugh (Moons kick) | MICH 24–14 |
| 3 | 3:10 | ND | Joel Williams 2-yard pass from Steve Beuerlein (kick failed) | MICH 24–20 |
| 4 | 4:26 | ND | Carney 25-yard field goal | MICH 24–23 |

On September 13, 1986, Notre Dame lost to No. 3 Michigan, 24–23, before a crowd of 59,075 at Notre Dame Stadium in South Bend, Indiana. The game was the first for Lou Holtz as Notre Dame's head coach.

On the game's opening possession, Michigan mounted a six-and-a-half-minute drive to the Notre Dame 25-yard line, but Pat Moons missed a 42-yard field goal. After Michigan's touchdown, Notre Dame drove 75 yards on 13 plays, capped by a three-yard touchdown run by flanker Tim Brown. On its second possession, Michigan followed with an 80-yard, eight-play drive, fueled by a 34-yard catch by John Kolesar, and capped by an eight-yard touchdown run by Jamie Morris.

On Notre Dame's second possession, the Irish again drove downfield, but Reggie Ward fumbled at Michigan's six-yard line, and Michigan recovered the loose ball. Notre Dame's defense held, and Michigan was forced to punt from its own end zone. Monte Robbins' punt was good for only 23 yards, and Notre Dame took over at Michigan's 26-yard line. Eight plays later, Mark Green scored on a one-yard run. After Green's touchdown, Jim Harbaugh led the Wolverines on a seven-minute, 75-yard, 13-play drive, and Pat Moons kicked a 23-yard field goal. Notre Dame led, 14–10, at halftime.

Michigan moved ahead in the third quarter. On the opening drive of the second half, Harbaugh led the Wolverines on a 78-yard, 12-play drive ending with a one-yard touchdown run by Morris. On the kickoff following the touchdown, the kick hit a Notre Dame player and bounced loose with free safety Doug Mallory recovering the ball at the Notre Dame 27-yard line. On the next play from scrimmage, Harbaugh threw a touchdown pass to Morris, and Michigan led 24–14.

On its next possession, Steve Beuerlein led the Irish on a 66-yard, 12-play touchdown drive ending with a two-yard pass from Beuerlein to Joel Williams. John Carney's extra point kick failed, and Michigan led, 24–20, at the end of the third quarter.

In the fourth quarter, Notre Dame drove 62 yards in 10 plays, and a 25-yard field goal by John Carney brought the Irish within one point with 4:26 remaining in the game. Then, with 1:33 remaining in the game, Michigan fullback Bob Perryman fumbled at the Notre Dame 26-yard line, and Notre Dame linebacker Wesley Pritchett recovered the loose ball. Beuerlein quickly led the Irish to Michigan's 28-yard line. With 13 seconds remaining, Carney's 45-yard field goal attempt went wide to the left.

Notre Dame out-gained Michigan, 455 yards to 393 yards. For the Irish, Steve Beuerlein completed 21 of 33 passes for 263 yards, at touchdown, and an interception, and Tim Brown rushed for 65 yards on 12 carries. For the Wolverines, Harbaugh completed 15 of 23 passes for 239 yards and a touchdown, Kolesar caught four passes for 93 yards, and Morris rushed for 77 yards and two touchdowns on 23 carries. Michigan forced four turnovers, including two fumble recoveries by Doug Mallory and a fourth-quarter interception by David Arnold in the end zone. Andy Moeller led the Michigan defense with seven solo tackles and six assists.

=== Purdue ===
| Team | 1 | 2 | 3 | 4 | Total |
|---|---|---|---|---|---|
| Purdue | 0 | 0 | 6 | 3 | 9 |
| • Notre Dame | 10 | 14 | 3 | 14 | 41 |

- Date: Saturday, September 27
- Location: Notre Dame Stadium, South Bend, Indiana
- Game attendance: 59,075

Scoring summary
| 1 | Notre Dame | Taylor 2-yard run (Carney kick) | Notre Dame 7-0 |
| 1 | Notre Dame | Carney 42-yard field goal | Notre Dame 10-0 |
| 2 | Notre Dame | Johnson 2-yard run (Carney kick) | Notre Dame 17-0 |
| 2 | Notre Dame | Jackson 35-yard pass from Beuerlein (Carney kick) | Notre Dame 24-0 |
| 3 | Notre Dame | Carney 49-yard field goal | Notre Dame 27-0 |
| 3 | Purdue | Chaney 3-yard run (pass failed) | Notre Dame 27-6 |
| 4 | Purdue | Briggs 22-yard field goal | Notre Dame 27-9 |
| 4 | Notre Dame | Johnson 13-yard run (Carney kick) | Notre Dame 34-9 |
| 4 | Notre Dame | Green 27-yard run (Carney kick ) | Notre Dame 41-9 |

=== Navy ===
Notre Dame Fighting Irish at Navy Midshipmen

| Quarter | 1 | 2 | 3 | 4 | Total |
|---|---|---|---|---|---|
| Notre Dame | 7 | 21 | 3 | 2 | 33 |
| Navy | 0 | 0 | 7 | 7 | 14 |

at Memorial Stadium • Baltimore, Maryland

- Game time: 7:05 p.m.
- Game attendance: 61,335
- TV: TBS
- Notre Dame Football Archives

Game information

Notre Dame

- Steve Beuerlein
  15/22, 248 Yds, 2 TD
- Anthony Johnson
  14 Rush, 50 Yds
- Tim Brown
  7 Rec, 184 Yds, TD

Navy

- Bob Misch
  12/27, 130 Yds
- Tony Hollinger
  13 Rush, 17 Yds, TD
- Mike Ray
  7 Rec, 83 Yds, TD

Scoring summary

| Quarter | Time | Drive | | | Team | Scoring information | Score | |
| Quarter | Time | Plays | Yards | TOP | Team | Scoring information | ND | NAVY |
|---|---|---|---|---|---|---|---|---|
| 1 | 2:36 | 14 | 57 | 6:40 | Notre Dame | Joel Williams 2-yard touchdown reception from Steve Beuerlein, John Carney kick good | 7 | 0 |
| 2 | 14:04 | 5 | 94 | 1:57 | Notre Dame | Tim Brown 77-yard touchdown reception from Steve Beuerlein, John Carney kick good | 14 | 0 |
| 2 | 7:40 | 9 | 60 | 4:18 | Notre Dame | Pernell Taylor 11-yard touchdown run, John Carney kick good | 21 | 0 |
| 2 | 2:35 | 5 | 2 | 0:42 | Notre Dame | Pernell Taylor 1-yard touchdown run, John Carney kick good | 28 | 0 |
| 3 | 12:25 | 7 | 53 | 2:35 | Notre Dame | 19-yard field goal by John Carney | 31 | 0 |
| 3 | 0:56 | 2 | 40 | 0:29 | Navy | Tony Hollinger 1-yard touchdown run, Ted Fundoukas kick good | 31 | 7 |
| 4 | 12:33 | | | | Notre Dame | Safety, intentional grounding penalty in end zone by Bob Misch | 33 | 7 |
| 4 | 7:59 | 8 | 77 | 2:27 | Navy | Mike Ray 21-yard touchdown reception from Bill Byrne, Ted Fundoukas kick good | 33 | 14 |
| "TOP" = time of possession. For other American football terms, see Glossary of American football. | | | | | | | 33 | 14 |

=== At USC ===
| Team | 1 | 2 | 3 | 4 | Total |
|---|---|---|---|---|---|
| • Notre Dame | 6 | 3 | 11 | 18 | 38 |
| USC | 3 | 17 | 10 | 7 | 37 |

- Date: November 29
- Location: Los Angeles, CA
- Television network: CBS

Scoring summary
| 1 | | USC | Shafer 48-yard field goal | USC 3-0 |
| 1 | | Notre Dame | Heck 5-yard pass from Beuerlein (kick failed) | Notre Dame 6-3 |
| 2 | | USC | Brock 58-yard interception return (Shafer kick) | USC 10-6 |
| 2 | | USC | Holt 3-yard run (Shafer kick) | USC 17-6 |
| 2 | | Notre Dame | Carney 33-yard field goal | USC 17-9 |
| 2 | | USC | Shafer 60-yard field goal | USC 20-9 |
| 3 | | USC | Shafer 23-yard field goal | USC 23-9 |
| 3 | | Notre Dame | Carney 32-yard field goal | USC 23-12 |
| 3 | | USC | Steele 1-yard run (Shafer kick) | USC 30-12 |
| 3 | | Notre Dame | Banks 22-yard pass from Beuerlein (Beuerlein to Jackson pass) | USC 30-20 |
| 4 | | USC | Peete 1-yard run (Shafer kick) | USC 37-20 |
| 4 | | Notre Dame | Jackson 42-yard pass from Beuerlein (Carney kick) | USC 37-27 |
| 4 | | Notre Dame | Banks 5-yard pass from Beuerlein (Beuerlein to Heck pass) | USC 37-35 |
| 4 | :00 | Notre Dame | Carney 19-yard field goal | Notre Dame 38-37 |

== Roster ==
1986 Notre Dame Fighting Irish football team roster
Players
Coaches
Offense

| Pos. | # | Name | Class |
|---|---|---|---|
| QB | 2 | Terry Andrysiak | Jr |
| QB | 7 | Steve Beuerlein | Sr |
| WR | 81 | Tim Brown | Jr |
| OT | 66 | Andy Heck | So |
| | 3 | Alonzo Jefferson |
| | | Anthony Johnson | Fr |
| | | Pernell Taylor |
| WR | 83 | Reggie Ward |
| | | Joel Williams |

Defense

| Pos. | # | Name | Class |
|---|---|---|---|
| LB | 48 | Cedric Figaro | Jr |

Special teams

| Pos. | # | Name | Class |
|---|---|---|---|
| K | 18 | John Carney |

Head coach

- Lou Holtz

Coordinators/assistant coaches

- Foge Fazio (DC)
- George Stewart (LB)

Legend

- (C) Team captain
- (S) Suspended
- (I) Ineligible
- Injured
- Redshirt

== 1987 NFL draft ==
The following Notre Dame players were selected in the 1987 NFL draft:

| Player | Position | Round | Pick | Franchise |
|---|---|---|---|---|
| Wally Kleine | Tackle | 2 | 48 | Washington Redskins |
| Steve Beuerlein | Quarterback | 4 | 110 | Los Angeles Raiders |
| Robert Banks | Defensive end | 7 | 176 | Houston Oilers |
| Joel D. Williams | Tight end | 8 | 210 | Miami Dolphins |
