= 1986 Northern Illinois Huskies football team =

American college football season

1986 Northern Illinois Huskies football
- Conference: Independent
- Record: 2–9
- Head coach: Jerry Pettibone (2nd season)
- Offensive coordinator: Pat Ruel (2nd season)
- Defensive coordinator: Tim McGuire (1st season)
- MVP: Todd Peat
- Captains: Doug Bartlett; Todd Peat
- Home stadium: Huskie Stadium

1986 NCAA Division I-A independents football records
| | Conf. | | | | | Overall |
| Team | W | | L | | T | W | | L | | T |
|---|---|---|---|---|---|---|---|---|---|---|
| No. 1 Penn State | | – | | – | | 12 | – | 0 | – | 0 |
| No. 2 Miami (FL) | | – | | – | | 11 | – | 1 | – | 0 |
| No. 20 Virginia Tech | | – | | – | | 9 | – | 2 | – | 1 |
| No. 19 Boston College | | – | | – | | 9 | – | 3 | – | 0 |
| Tulsa | | – | | – | | 7 | – | 4 | – | 0 |
| Florida State | | – | | – | | 7 | – | 4 | – | 1 |
| Army | | – | | – | | 6 | – | 5 | – | 0 |
| Southwestern Louisiana | | – | | – | | 6 | – | 5 | – | 0 |
| Southern Miss | | – | | – | | 6 | – | 5 | – | 0 |
| Temple | | – | | – | | 6 | – | 5 | – | 0 |
| Pittsburgh | | – | | – | | 5 | – | 5 | – | 1 |
| Rutgers | | – | | – | | 5 | – | 5 | – | 1 |
| Cincinnati | | – | | – | | 5 | – | 6 | – | 0 |
| Notre Dame | | – | | – | | 5 | – | 6 | – | 0 |
| Syracuse | | – | | – | | 5 | – | 6 | – | 0 |
| South Carolina | | – | | – | | 3 | – | 6 | – | 2 |
| Tulane | | – | | – | | 4 | – | 7 | – | 0 |
| West Virginia | | – | | – | | 4 | – | 7 | – | 0 |
| Louisville | | – | | – | | 3 | – | 8 | – | 0 |
| Navy | | – | | – | | 3 | – | 8 | – | 0 |
| Wichita State | | – | | – | | 3 | – | 8 | – | 0 |
| East Carolina | | – | | – | | 2 | – | 9 | – | 0 |
| Northern Illinois | | – | | – | | 2 | – | 9 | – | 0 |
| Memphis State | | – | | – | | 1 | – | 10 | – | 0 |
Rankings from AP Poll

The 1986 Northern Illinois Huskies football team represented Northern Illinois University as an independent during the 1986 NCAA Division I-A football season. Led by second-year head coach Jerry Pettibone, the Huskies compiled a record of 2–9. Northern Illinois played home games at Huskie Stadium in DeKalb, Illinois.

== Schedule ==
| Date | Time | Opponent | Site | Result | Attendance | Source |
|---|---|---|---|---|---|---|
| August 30 | 6:30 pm | Ball State | Huskie Stadium; DeKalb, IL (rivalry) | L 10–20 | 11,369 | |
| September 6 | 12:00 pm | at West Virginia | Mountaineer Field; Morgantown, WV | L 14–47 | 56,665 | |
| September 13 | 1:00 pm | at Wisconsin | Camp Randall Stadium; Madison, WI | L 20–35 | 63,294 | |
| September 20 | 1:00 pm | at Iowa | Kinnick Stadium; Iowa City, IA | L 3–57 | 66,930 | |
| September 27 | 6:30 pm | Western Illinois | Huskie Stadium; DeKalb, IL | L 0–10 | 26,364 | |
| October 4 | 6:30 pm | at No. 1 Miami (FL) | Miami Orange Bowl; Miami, FL | L 0–34 | 33,905 | |
| October 18 | 3:30 pm | at Toledo | Glass Bowl; Toledo, OH | L 28–29 | 19,169 | |
| October 25 | 1:00 pm | Miami (OH)^{†} | Huskie Stadium; DeKalb, IL | L 6–20 | 13,128 | |
| November 1 | 12:30 pm | at Bowling Green | Doyt Perry Stadium; Bowling Green, OH | W 16–8 | 10,102 | |
| November 8 | 1:00 pm | Eastern Michigan | Huskie Stadium; DeKalb, IL | W 21–14 | 8,556 | |
| November 15 | 1:00 pm | at Ohio | Peden Stadium; Athens, OH | L 26–34 | 4,844 | |
^{†}Homecoming; Rankings from AP Poll released prior to the game; All times are in Central time
