= 1986 Louisville Cardinals football team =

American college football season

1986 Louisville Cardinals football
- Conference: Independent
- Record: 3–8
- Head coach: Howard Schnellenberger (2nd season)
- Defensive coordinator: Rick Lantz (1st season)
- Home stadium: Cardinal Stadium

1986 NCAA Division I-A independents football records
	Conf.					Overall
Team	W		L		T	W		L		T
No. 1 Penn State		–		–		12	–	0	–	0
No. 2 Miami (FL)		–		–		11	–	1	–	0
No. 20 Virginia Tech		–		–		9	–	2	–	1
No. 19 Boston College		–		–		9	–	3	–	0
Tulsa		–		–		7	–	4	–	0
Florida State		–		–		7	–	4	–	1
Army		–		–		6	–	5	–	0
Southwestern Louisiana		–		–		6	–	5	–	0
Southern Miss		–		–		6	–	5	–	0
Temple		–		–		6	–	5	–	0
Pittsburgh		–		–		5	–	5	–	1
Rutgers		–		–		5	–	5	–	1
Cincinnati		–		–		5	–	6	–	0
Notre Dame		–		–		5	–	6	–	0
Syracuse		–		–		5	–	6	–	0
South Carolina		–		–		3	–	6	–	2
Tulane		–		–		4	–	7	–	0
West Virginia		–		–		4	–	7	–	0
Louisville		–		–		3	–	8	–	0
Navy		–		–		3	–	8	–	0
Wichita State		–		–		3	–	8	–	0
East Carolina		–		–		2	–	9	–	0
Northern Illinois		–		–		2	–	9	–	0
Memphis State		–		–		1	–	10	–	0
Rankings from AP Poll

The 1986 Louisville Cardinals football team represented the University of Louisville in the 1986 NCAA Division I-A football season. The Cardinals, led by second-year head coach Howard Schnellenberger, participated as independents and played their home games at Cardinal Stadium.

== Schedule ==
Date	Opponent	Site	Result	Attendance	Source
September 6	at Illinois	Memorial Stadium; Champaign, IL	L 0–23	72,822	
September 13	at Indiana	Memorial Stadium; Bloomington, IN	L 0–21	35,126	
September 20	Western Kentucky	Cardinal Stadium; Louisville, KY	W 45–6	34,144	
September 27	Memphis State	Cardinal Stadium; Louisville, KY (rivalry)	W 34–8	30,801	
October 4	at Cincinnati	Nippert Stadium; Cincinnati, OH (The Keg of Nails)	L 17–24	16,317	
October 18	at Boston College	Alumni Stadium; Chestnut Hill, MA	L 7–41	28,105	
October 25	Florida State	Cardinal Stadium; Louisville, KY	L 18–54	22,822	
November 1	Rutgers^{†}	Cardinal Stadium; Louisville, KY	L 0–41	20,165	
November 8	at Tulane	Louisiana Superdome; New Orleans, LA	W 23–12	22,108	
November 15	West Virginia	Cardinal Stadium; Louisville, KY	L 19–42	21,834	
November 22	at Southern Miss	M. M. Roberts Stadium; Hattiesburg, MS	L 16–31	11,231	
^{†}Homecoming
