= 1986 Southern Miss Golden Eagles football team =

American college football season

1986 Southern Miss Golden Eagles football
- Conference: Independent
- Record: 6–5
- Head coach: Jim Carmody (5th season)
- Offensive coordinator: Keith Daniels (5th season)
- Home stadium: M. M. Roberts Stadium

1986 NCAA Division I-A independents football records
	Conf.					Overall
Team	W		L		T	W		L		T
No. 1 Penn State		–		–		12	–	0	–	0
No. 2 Miami (FL)		–		–		11	–	1	–	0
No. 20 Virginia Tech		–		–		9	–	2	–	1
No. 19 Boston College		–		–		9	–	3	–	0
Tulsa		–		–		7	–	4	–	0
Florida State		–		–		7	–	4	–	1
Army		–		–		6	–	5	–	0
Southwestern Louisiana		–		–		6	–	5	–	0
Southern Miss		–		–		6	–	5	–	0
Temple		–		–		6	–	5	–	0
Pittsburgh		–		–		5	–	5	–	1
Rutgers		–		–		5	–	5	–	1
Cincinnati		–		–		5	–	6	–	0
Notre Dame		–		–		5	–	6	–	0
Syracuse		–		–		5	–	6	–	0
South Carolina		–		–		3	–	6	–	2
Tulane		–		–		4	–	7	–	0
West Virginia		–		–		4	–	7	–	0
Louisville		–		–		3	–	8	–	0
Navy		–		–		3	–	8	–	0
Wichita State		–		–		3	–	8	–	0
East Carolina		–		–		2	–	9	–	0
Northern Illinois		–		–		2	–	9	–	0
Memphis State		–		–		1	–	10	–	0
Rankings from AP Poll

The 1986 Southern Miss Golden Eagles football team was an American football team that represented the University of Southern Mississippi as an independent during the 1986 NCAA Division I-A football season. In their fifth year under head coach Jim Carmody, the team compiled a 6–5 record.

== Schedule ==
Date	Opponent	Site	Result	Attendance	Source
September 6	Northeast Louisiana	M. M. Roberts Stadium; Hattiesburg, MS	W 28–19	21,364	
September 13	at No. 4 Alabama	Legion Field; Birmingham, AL	L 17–31	73,687	
September 20	vs. Mississippi State	Mississippi Veterans Memorial Stadium; Jackson, MS	W 28–24	50,000	
September 27	at No. 14 Texas A&M	Kyle Field; College Station, TX	L 7–16	54,938	
October 4	at Kentucky	Commonwealth Stadium; Lexington, KY	L 0–32	58,102	
October 18	Memphis State^{†}	M. M. Roberts Stadium; Hattiesburg, MS (rivalry)	W 14–9	25,352	
October 25	at Tulane	Louisiana Superdome; New Orleans, LA (rivalry)	L 20–35	28,417	
November 1	at East Carolina	Ficklen Memorial Stadium; Greenville, NC	W 23–21	18,127	
November 8	Southwestern Louisiana	M. M. Roberts Stadium; Hattiesburg, MS	W 17–0	14,512	
November 15	at Florida State	Doak Campbell Stadium; Tallahassee, FL	L 13–49	60,103	
November 22	Louisville	M. M. Roberts Stadium; Hattiesburg, MS	W 31–16	11,231	
^{†}Homecoming; Rankings from AP Poll released prior to the game
