= Fred Jones (linebacker, born 1965) =

American football player (born 1965)

No. 96
- Position: Linebacker

Personal information
- Born: September 2, 1965 (age 61); Miami, Florida, U.S.
- Listed height: 6 ft 3 in (1.91 m)
- Listed weight: 240 lb (109 kg)

Career information
- High school: South (Miami)
- College: Florida State (1983–1986)
- NFL draft: 1987: undrafted

Career history
- San Diego Chargers (1987); Kansas City Chiefs (1987); Cleveland Browns (1989)*
- * Offseason or practice squad member only

Awards and highlights
- Second-team All-South Independent (1986)
- Stats at Pro Football Reference

Fredrick Daniels Jones (born September 2, 1965) is an American former professional football linebacker who played one season with the Kansas City Chiefs of the National Football League (NFL). He played college football at Florida State University.

== Early life ==
Fredrick Daniels Jones was born on September 2, 1965, in Miami, Florida. He attended South Miami High School in Miami.

== College career ==
Jones was a four-year letterman for the Florida State Seminoles from 1983 to 1986. He played in four games his freshman year in 1983, recording 13 solo tackles and five assisted tackles. He appeared in 11 games in 1984, totaling 65 solo tackles, 40 assisted tackles, five sacks, and three pass breakups. Jones played in 11 games for the second straight season in 1985, accumulating 55 solo tackles, 50 assisted tackles, three sacks, one forced fumble, one interception, and one pass breakup. He played in 11 games for the third consecutive season in 1986, recording 50 solo tackles, 48 assisted tackles, three sacks, three forced fumbles, one fumble recovery, and four pass breakups, earning second-team All-South Independent honors and Associated Press honorable mention All-American honors.

== Professional career ==
Jones signed with the San Diego Chargers after going undrafted in the 1987 NFL draft. He was released on August 29, 1987. He later re-signed with the Chargers on September 22 before being released again on October 2, 1987.

Jones was signed by the Kansas City Chiefs on October 6, 1987, during the 1987 NFL players strike. He played in two games for the Chiefs before being placed on injured reserve on October 19. He was released later in 1987.

Jones signed with the Cleveland Browns in 1989. He was released on June 27, 1989.

== Personal life ==
Jones's son brother Marvin Jones and son Fredrick Jones both played football at Florida State as well.
