= Paul O'Connor (American football) =

American football player (born 1962)

No. 60
- Position: Guard

Personal information
- Born: November 7, 1962 (age 63); Summit, New Jersey, U.S.
- Listed height: 6 ft 3 in (1.91 m)
- Listed weight: 270 lb (122 kg)

Career information
- High school: Gov. Livingston Regional; Worcester Academy
- College: Miami
- NFL draft: 1987: 5th round, 140th overall pick

Career history
- New York Giants (1987)*; Tampa Bay Buccaneers (1987); San Francisco 49ers (1988)
- * Offseason or practice squad member only

Awards and highlights
- National champion (1983); 1986 First Team All-South Independent

Career NFL statistics
- Games played: 2
- Games started: 2
- Stats at Pro Football Reference

Paul O'Connor (born November 7, 1962) is an American former professional football player who was a guard for the Tampa Bay Buccaneers of the National Football League (NFL). He was selected by the Buccaneers in the fifth round of the 1987 NFL draft. He played college football for the Miami Hurricanes.
