= 1987 NFL draft =

National Football League Draft

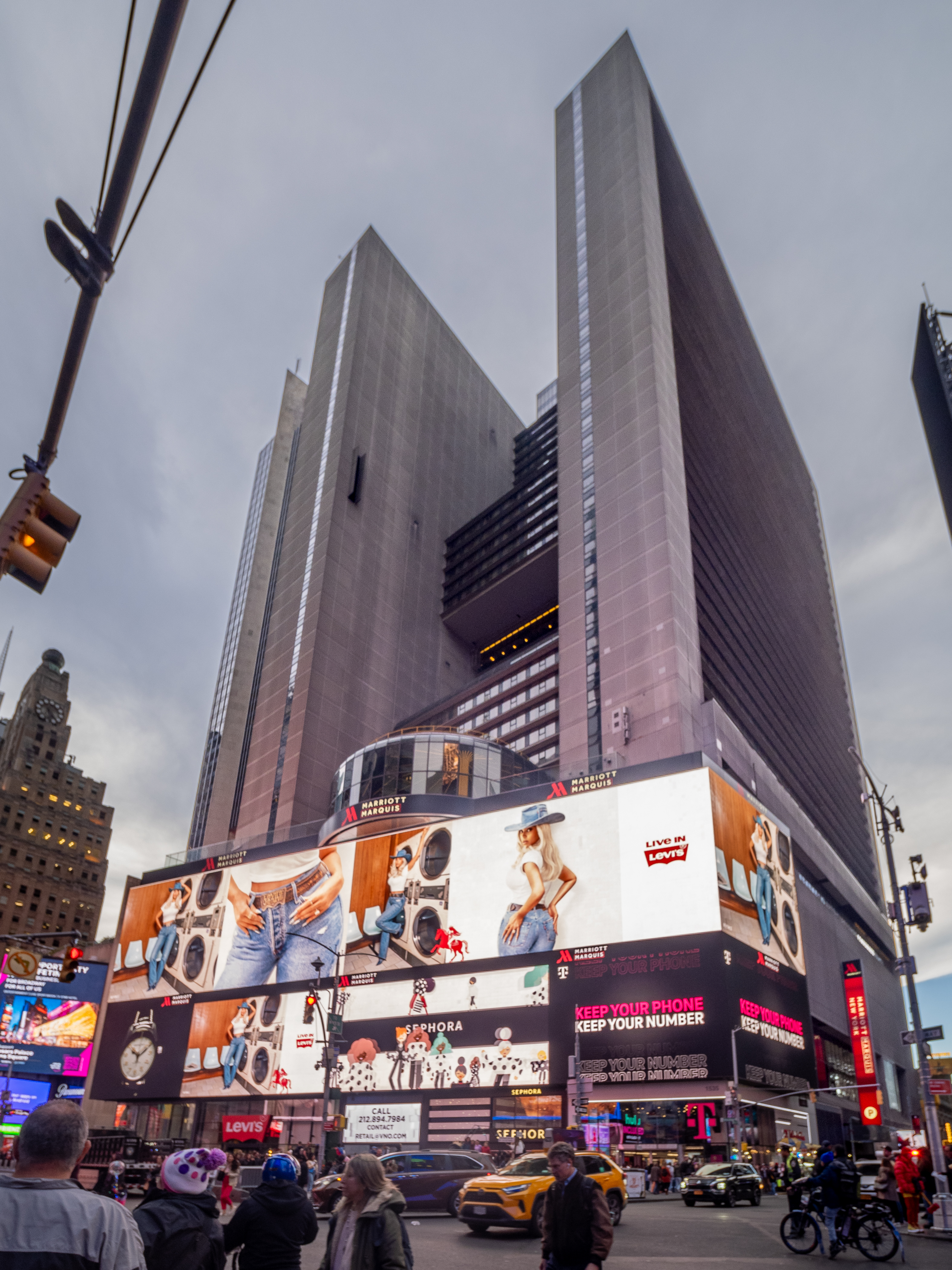
- New York Marriott Marquis (draft venue), photographed in 2024

General information
- Date: April 28–29, 1987
- Location: New York Marriott Marquis in New York City, New York
- Network: ESPN

Overview
- 335 total selections in 12 rounds
- League: National Football League
- First selection: Vinny Testaverde, QB; Tampa Bay Buccaneers
- Mr. Irrelevant: Norman Jefferson, CB; Green Bay Packers
- Most selections (20): Tampa Bay Buccaneers
- Fewest selections (8): Cleveland Browns
- Hall of Famers: 2: CB Rod Woodson; WR Cris Carter

The 1987 NFL draft was the procedure by which National Football League teams selected amateur college football players. It is officially known as the NFL Annual Player Selection Meeting. The draft was held April 28–29, 1987, at the Marriot Marquis in New York City, New York. The league also held a supplemental draft after the regular draft and before the regular season.

With the first overall pick of the draft, the Tampa Bay Buccaneers selected quarterback Vinny Testaverde.

== Player selections ==
*	Compensatory selection
†	Pro Bowler
‡	Hall of Famer

Positions key
Offense	Defense	Special teams
QB — Quarterback; RB — Running back; FB — Fullback; WR — Wide receiver; TE — Tight end; OL — Offensive lineman; T — Tackle; G — Guard; C — Center	DL — Defensive lineman; DT — Defensive tackle (Note: Includes nose tackle (NT)); DE — Defensive end; EDGE — Edge rusher; LB — Linebacker (Note: Includes middle linebacker (MLB/MIKE), weakside linebacker (WILL), strongside linebacker (SAM), off-ball linebacker, and outside linebacker (OLB)); DB — Defensive back; CB — Cornerback; S — Safety (Note: Includes free safety (FS) and strong safety (SS))	K — Kicker (Note: Also known as a placekicker (PK)); P — Punter; LS — Long snapper; RS — Return specialist (Note: Includes kickoff and punt returners)

Rnd.	Pick	Team	Player	Pos.	College	Notes
1	1	Tampa Bay Buccaneers	Vinny Testaverde ^{†}	QB	Miami (FL)	1986 Heisman Trophy winner
1	2	Indianapolis Colts	Cornelius Bennett ^{†}	LB	Alabama	
1	3	Houston Oilers	Alonzo Highsmith	RB	Miami (FL)	from Buffalo (Note: No. 3: Buffalo → Houston (D). Buffalo traded a first-round selection (3rd overall) to Houston in exchange for first- and second-round selections (8th and 36th overall).)
1	4	Green Bay Packers	Brent Fullwood ^{†}	RB	Auburn	
1	5	Cleveland Browns	Mike Junkin	LB	Duke	from San Diego (Note: No. 5: San Diego → Cleveland (D). San Diego traded first- and second-round selections (5th and 32nd overall) to Cleveland in exchange for first- and second-round selections (24th and 53rd overall), and LB Chip Banks.)
1	6	St. Louis Cardinals	Kelly Stouffer	QB	Colorado State	
1	7	Detroit Lions	Reggie Rogers	DT	Washington	
1	8	Buffalo Bills	Shane Conlan ^{†}	LB	Penn State	from Houston (Note: No. 8: Houston → Buffalo (D). See Round 1: Buffalo → Houston.)
1	9	Philadelphia Eagles	Jerome Brown ^{†}	DT	Miami (FL)	
1	10	Pittsburgh Steelers	Rod Woodson^{‡}^{†}	CB	Purdue	
1	11	New Orleans Saints	Shawn Knight	DT	BYU	
1	12	Dallas Cowboys	Danny Noonan	DT	Nebraska	
1	13	Atlanta Falcons	Chris Miller ^{†}	QB	Oregon	
1	14	Minnesota Vikings	D. J. Dozier	RB	Penn State	from Miami (Note: No. 14: Miami → Minnesota (D). Miami traded a first-round selection (14th overall) to Minnesota in exchange for first- and fifth-round selections (16th and 128th overall).)
1	15	Los Angeles Raiders	John Clay	T	Missouri	
1	16	Miami Dolphins	John Bosa	DE	Boston College	from Minnesota (Note: No. 16: Minnesota → Miami (D). See Round 1: Miami → Minnesota.)
1	17	Cincinnati Bengals	Jason Buck	DE	BYU	
1	18	Seattle Seahawks	Tony Woods	DE	Pittsburgh	
1	19	Kansas City Chiefs	Paul Palmer	RB	Temple	
1	20	Houston Oilers	Haywood Jeffires ^{†}	WR	NC State	from LA Rams (Note: No. 20: LA Rams → Houston (PD). The LA Rams traded first- and fifth-round selections (20th and 133rd overall), a 1988 first-round selection, G Kent Hill and the rights to DE William Fuller to Houston in exchange for the rights to QB Jim Everett.)
1	21	New York Jets	Roger Vick	FB	Texas A&M	
1	22	San Francisco 49ers	Harris Barton ^{†}	T	North Carolina	
1	23	New England Patriots	Bruce Armstrong ^{†}	T	Louisville	
1	24	San Diego Chargers	Rod Bernstine	RB	Texas A&M	from Cleveland (Note: No. 24: Cleveland → San Diego (D). See Round 1: San Diego → Cleveland.)
1	25	San Francisco 49ers	Terrence Flagler	RB	Clemson	from Washington (Note: No. 25: Washington → San Francisco (PD). Washington traded a first-round selection (25th overall) and a 1986 tenth-round selection to San Francisco in exchange for a 1986 second-round selection.)
1	26	Chicago Bears	Jim Harbaugh ^{†}	QB	Michigan	
1	27	Denver Broncos	Ricky Nattiel	WR	Florida	
1	28	New York Giants	Mark Ingram	WR	Michigan State	
2	29	Buffalo Bills	Nate Odomes ^{†}	CB	Wisconsin	from Tampa Bay (Note: No. 29: Tampa Bay → Buffalo (D). Tampa Bay traded a second-round selection (29th overall) to Buffalo in exchange for second- and fourth-round selections (36th and 87th overall).)
2	30	Washington Redskins	Brian Davis	CB	Nebraska	from Indianapolis (Note: No. 30: Indianapolis → Washington (PD). Indianapolis traded a second-round selection (30th overall) to Washington in exchange for the rights to DE Walter Murray.)
2	31	Atlanta Falcons	Kenny Flowers	RB	Clemson	from Green Bay (Note: No. 31: Green Bay → Atlanta (D). Green Bay traded a second-round selection (31st overall) to Atlanta in exchange for second- and third-round selections (41st and 69th overall).)
2	32	Cleveland Browns	Gregg Rakoczy	C	Miami (FL)	from San Diego (Note: No. 32: San Diego → Cleveland (D). See Round 1: San Diego → Cleveland.)
2	33	Buffalo Bills	Roland Mitchell	CB	Texas Tech	
2	34	St. Louis Cardinals	Tim McDonald ^{†}	S	USC	
2	35	Kansas City Chiefs	Christian Okoye ^{†}	FB	Azusa Pacific	from Houston (Note: No. 35: Houston → Kansas City (D). Houston traded a second-round selection (35th overall) to Kansas City in exchange for second- and fourth-round selections (46th and 105th overall).)
2	36	Tampa Bay Buccaneers	Ricky Reynolds	CB	Washington State	from Detroit via Houston and Buffalo (Note: No. 36: Detroit → Houston → Buffalo → Tampa Bay. Multiple trades: Detroit → Houston (PD). Detroit traded a second-round selection (36th overall) to Houston in exchange for OT Harvey Salem. Houston → Buffalo (D). See Round 1: Buffalo → Houston. Buffalo → Tampa Bay (D). See Round 2: Tampa Bay → Buffalo.)
2	37	San Francisco 49ers	Jeff Bregel	G	USC	from Philadelphia (Note: No. 37: Philadelphia → San Francisco (PD). Philadelphia traded a second-round selection (37th overall) and a 1986 third-round selection to San Francisco in exchange for QB Matt Cavanaugh.)
2	38	Pittsburgh Steelers	Delton Hall	CB	Clemson	
2	39	Dallas Cowboys	Ron Francis	CB	Baylor	
2	40	New Orleans Saints	Lonzell Hill	WR	Washington	
2	41	Green Bay Packers	Johnny Holland	LB	Texas A&M	from Atlanta (Note: No. 41: Atlanta → Green Bay (D). See Round 2: Green Bay → Atlanta.)
2	42	New York Jets	Alex Gordon	LB	Cincinnati	from LA Raiders (Note: No. 42: LA Raiders → NY Jets (D). The LA Raiders traded a second-round selection (42nd overall) to the NY Jets in exchange for second- and fourth-round selections (48th and 102nd overall).)
2	43	Miami Dolphins	Rick Graf	LB	Wisconsin	
2	44	Minnesota Vikings	Ray Berry	LB	Baylor	
2	45	Seattle Seahawks	Dave Wyman	LB	Stanford	
2	46	Houston Oilers	Walter Johnson	LB	Louisiana Tech	from Kansas City (Note: No. 46: Kansas City → Houston (D). See Round 2: Houston → Kansas City.)
2	47	Los Angeles Rams	Donald Evans	DE	Winston-Salem State	
2	48	Washington Redskins	Wally Kleine	T	Notre Dame	from NY Jets via LA Raiders (Note: No. 48: NY Jets → LA Raiders → Washington. Multiple trades: NY Jets → LA Raiders (D). See Round 2: LA Raiders → NY Jets. LA Raiders → Washington (D). The LA Raiders traded a second-round selection (48th overall) to Washington in exchange for second- and fifth-round selections (52nd and 120th overall).)
2	49	Cincinnati Bengals	Eric Thomas ^{†}	CB	Tulane	
2	50	Tampa Bay Buccaneers	Winston Moss	LB	Miami (FL)	from San Francisco (Note: No. 50: San Francisco → Tampa Bay (PD). San Francisco traded second- and fourth-round selections (50th and 106th overall) to Tampa Bay in exchange for QB Steve Young.)
2	51	Tampa Bay Buccaneers	Don Smith	RB	Mississippi State	from New England (Note: No. 51: New England → Tampa Bay (PD). New England traded second-, seventh- and tenth-round selections (51st, 190th and 246th overall) to Tampa Bay in exchange for G Sean Farrell.)
2	52	Los Angeles Raiders	Bruce Wilkerson	T	Tennessee	from Washington (Note: No. 52: Washington → LA Raiders (D). See Round 2: LA Raiders → Washington.)
2	53	San Diego Chargers	Lou Brock	CB	USC	from Cleveland (Note: No. 53: Cleveland → San Diego (D). See Round 1: San Diego → Cleveland.)
2	54	Chicago Bears	Ron Morris	WR	SMU	
2	55	New York Giants	Adrian White	S	Florida	from Denver (Note: No. 55: Denver → NY Giants (PD). Denver traded a second-round selection (55th overall), and 1986 second- and sixth-round selections to the NY Giants in exchange for CB Mark Haynes.)
2	56	Miami Dolphins	Scott Schwedes	WR	Syracuse	from NY Giants via St. Louis (Note: No. 56: NY Giants → St. Louis → Miami. Multiple trades: NY Giants → St. Louis (PD). The NY Giants traded second- and seventh-round selections (56th and 195th overall) to St. Louis in exchange for RB Ottis Anderson. St. Louis → Miami (D). St. Louis traded a second-round selection (56th overall) to Miami in exchange for third- and fifth-round selections (70th and 126th overall).)
3	57	Tampa Bay Buccaneers	Mark Carrier ^{†}	WR	Nicholls State	
3	58	Indianapolis Colts	Chris Gambol	T	Iowa	
3	59	San Diego Chargers	Karl Wilson	DE	LSU	
3	60	Buffalo Bills	David Brandon	LB	Memphis State	
3	61	Green Bay Packers	Dave Croston	T	Iowa	
3	62	St. Louis Cardinals	Rob Awalt	TE	San Diego State	
3	63	Detroit Lions	Jerry Ball ^{†}	DT	SMU	
3	64	Houston Oilers	Cody Carlson	QB	Baylor	
3	65	Philadelphia Eagles	Ben Tamburello	C	Auburn	
3	66	Pittsburgh Steelers	Charles Lockett	WR	Long Beach State	
3	67	New Orleans Saints	Mike Adams	DB	Arkansas State	
3	68	Dallas Cowboys	Jeff Zimmerman	G	Florida	
3	69	Green Bay Packers	Scott Stephen	LB	Arizona State	from Atlanta (Note: No. 69: Atlanta → Green Bay (D). See Round 2: Green Bay → Atlanta.)
3	70	St. Louis Cardinals	Colin Scotts	DT	Hawaii	from Miami (Note: No. 70: Miami → St. Louis (D). See Round 2: St. Louis → Miami.)
3	71	Green Bay Packers	Frankie Neal	WR	Fort Hays State	from LA Raiders (Note: No. 71: LA Raiders → Green Bay (PD). The LA Raiders traded a third-round selection (71st overall) and a 1988 fourth-round selection in exchange for WR James Lofton.)
3	72	Minnesota Vikings	Henry Thomas ^{†}	DT	LSU	
3	73	Kansas City Chiefs	Todd Howard	LB	Texas A&M	
3	74	Los Angeles Rams	Cliff Hicks	CB	Oregon	
3	75	New York Jets	Onzy Elam	LB	Tennessee State	
3	76	Cincinnati Bengals	Leonard Ball	DB	Indiana	
3	77	Cincinnati Bengals	Skip McClendon	DE	Arizona State	from Seattle (Note: No. 77: Seattle → Cincinnati (PD). Seattle traded a third-round selection (77th overall) to Cincinnati in exchange for OT Mike Wilson.)
3	78	Buffalo Bills	Jamie Mueller	RB	Benedictine	from San Francisco (Note: No. 78: San Francisco → Buffalo (PD). San Francisco traded a third-round selection (78th overall) and a 1988 fifth-round selection to Buffalo in exchange for RB Joe Cribbs.)
3	79	New England Patriots	Bob Perryman	RB	Michigan	
3	80	Cleveland Browns	Tim Manoa	FB	Penn State	
3	81	Los Angeles Raiders	Steve Smith	FB	Penn State	from Washington via New England (Note: No. 81: Washington → New England → LA Raiders. Multiple trades: Washington → New England (PD). Washington traded a third-round selection (81st overall) to New England in exchange for the rights to WR Ricky Sanders. New England → LA Raiders (D). New England traded third- and tenth-round selections (81st and 274th overall) to the LA Raiders in exchange for two fourth-round selections (98th and 102nd overall).)
3	82	Cleveland Browns	Jeff Jaeger ^{†}	K	Washington	from Chicago via LA Rams (Note: No. 82: Chicago → LA Rams → Cleveland. Multiple trades: Chicago → LA Rams (PD). Chicago traded third- and sixth-round selections (82nd and 166th overall) to the LA Rams in exchange for a fourth-round selection (101st overall) and QB Doug Flutie. LA Rams → Cleveland (D). The LA Rams traded a third-round selection (82nd overall) to Cleveland in exchange for fourth-, fifth- and twelfth-round selections (108th, 136th and 332nd overall).)
3	83	New York Giants	Stephen Baker	WR	Fresno State	
3	84	Denver Broncos	Michael Brooks ^{†}	LB	LSU	
4	85	Tampa Bay Buccaneers	Don Graham	LB	Penn State	
4	86	Indianapolis Colts	Randy Dixon	T	Pittsburgh	
4	87	Tampa Bay Buccaneers	Ron Hall	TE	Hawaii	from Buffalo (Note: No. 87: Buffalo → Tampa Bay (D). See Round 2: Buffalo → Tampa Bay.)
4	88	San Diego Chargers	Mark Vlasic	QB	Iowa	
4	89	Green Bay Packers	Lorenzo Freeman	DT	Pittsburgh	
4	90	St. Louis Cardinals	Rod Saddler	DT	Texas A&M	
4	91	Los Angeles Rams	Doug Bartlett	DT	Northern Illinois	from Houston (Note: No. 91: Houston → LA Rams (PD). Houston traded a fourth-round selection (91st overall) and a 1986 seventh-round selection to the LA Rams in exchange for WR Drew Hill.)
4	92	Detroit Lions	Garland Rivers	S	Michigan	
4	93	Philadelphia Eagles	Byron Evans	LB	Arizona	
4	94	Pittsburgh Steelers	Thomas Everett ^{†}	S	Baylor	
4	95	Dallas Cowboys	Kelvin Martin	WR	Boston College	
4	96	New Orleans Saints	Steve Trapilo	G	Boston College	
4	97	Atlanta Falcons	Ralph Van Dyke	T	Southern Illinois	
4	98	New England Patriots	Rich Gannon ^{†}	QB	Delaware	from LA Raiders (Note: No. 98: LA Raiders → New England (D). See Round 3: New England → LA Raiders.)
4	99	Miami Dolphins	Troy Stradford	RB	Boston College	
4	100	Minnesota Vikings	Reggie Rutland	S	Georgia Tech	
4	101	Chicago Bears	Sean Smith	DE	Grambling State	from LA Rams (Note: No. 101: LA Rams → Chicago (D). See Round 3: Chicago → LA Rams.)
4	102	New England Patriots	Derrick Beasley	DB	Winston-Salem State	from NY Jets via LA Raiders (Note: No. 102: NY Jets → LA Raiders → New England. Multiple trades: NY Jets → LA Raiders (D). See Round 2: LA Raiders → NY Jets. LA Raiders → New England (D). See Round 3: New England → LA Raiders.)
4	103	Cincinnati Bengals	Jim Riggs	TE	Clemson	
4	104	Seattle Seahawks	Mark Moore	DB	Oklahoma State	
4	105	Houston Oilers	Mark Dusbabek	LB	Minnesota	from Kansas City (Note: No. 105: Kansas City → Houston (D). See Round 2: Houston → Kansas City.)
4	106	Tampa Bay Buccaneers	Bruce Hill	WR	Arizona State	from San Francisco (Note: No. 106: San Francisco → Tampa Bay (D). See Round 2: San Francisco → Tampa Bay.)
4	107	New England Patriots	Tim Jordan	LB	Wisconsin	
4	108	Los Angeles Rams	Larry Kelm	LB	Texas A&M	from Cleveland (Note: No. 108: Cleveland → LA Rams (D). See Round 3: LA Rams → Cleveland.)
4	109	Buffalo Bills	Leon Seals	DE	Jackson State	from Washington (Note: No. 109: Washington → Buffalo (D). Washington traded a fourth-round selection (109th overall) to Buffalo in exchange for fifth- and sixth-round selections (117th and 144th overall).)
4	110	Los Angeles Raiders	Steve Beuerlein ^{†}	QB	Notre Dame	from Chicago (Note: No. 110: Chicago → LA Raiders (D). Chicago traded a fourth-round selection (110th overall) to the LA Raiders in exchange for fifth- and sixth-round selections (120th and 154th overall).)
4	111	Denver Broncos	Marc Munford	LB	Nebraska	
4	112	New York Giants	Odessa Turner	WR	Northwestern State	
5	113	New England Patriots	Danny Villa	T	Arizona State	from Tampa Bay (Note: No. 113: Tampa Bay → New England (PD). Tampa Bay traded a fifth-round selection (113th overall) to New England in exchange for a 1986 sixth-round selection.)
5	114	Indianapolis Colts	Roy Banks	WR	Eastern Illinois	
5	115	San Diego Chargers	Nelson Jones	DB	NC State	from Green Bay (Note: No. 115: Green Bay → San Diego (PD). Green Bay traded a fifth-round selection (115th overall) and a 1986 first-round selection to San Diego in exchange for the rights to S Mossy Cade.)
5	116	New England Patriots	Tom Gibson	DE	Northern Arizona	from San Diego (Note: No. 116: San Diego → New England (PD). San Diego traded a fifth-round selection (116th overall) to New England in exchange for S Vencie Glenn.)
5	117	Washington Redskins	Timmy Smith	RB	Texas Tech	from Buffalo (Note: No. 117: Buffalo → Washington (D). See Round 4: Washington → Buffalo.)
5	118	St. Louis Cardinals	George Swarn	RB	Miami (OH)	
5	119	Seattle Seahawks	Tommie Agee	RB	Auburn	from Detroit (Note: No. 119: Detroit → Seattle (PD). Detroit traded a fifth-round selection (119th overall) to Seattle in exchange for LB Shelton Robinson.)
5	120	Chicago Bears	Steve Bryan	DE	Oklahoma	from Houston via Washington and LA Raiders (Note: No. 120: Houston → Washington → LA Raiders → Chicago. Multiple trades: Houston → Washington (D). Houston traded a fifth-round selection (120th overall) to Washington in exchange for K Tony Zendejas. Washington → LA Raiders (D). See Round 2: LA Raiders → Washington. LA Raiders → Chicago (D) See Round 4: Chicago → LA Raiders.)
5	121	Philadelphia Eagles	David Alexander	C	Tulsa	
5	122	Pittsburgh Steelers	Hardy Nickerson ^{†}	LB	California	
5	123	New Orleans Saints	Milton Mack	CB	Alcorn State	
5	124	Dallas Cowboys	Everett Gay	WR	Texas	
5	125	Atlanta Falcons	Mark Mraz	DE	Utah State	
5	126	St. Louis Cardinals	John Bruno	P	Penn State	from Miami (Note: No. 126: Miami → St. Louis (D). See Round 2: St. Louis → Miami.)
5	127	St. Louis Cardinals	Ilia Jarostchuk	LB	New Hampshire	from LA Raiders (Note: No. 127: LA Raiders → St. Louis (PD). The LA Raiders traded a fifth-round selection (127th overall) to St. Louis in exchange for CB Lionel Washington.)
5	128	Kansas City Chiefs	Kitrick Taylor	WR	Washington State	from Minnesota via Miami (Note: No. 128: Minnesota → Miami → Kansas City. Multiple trades: Minnesota → Miami (D). See Round 1: Miami → Minnesota. Miami → Kansas City (D) Miami traded a fifth-round selection (128th overall) to Kansas City in exchange for fifth- and eighth-round selections (132nd and 212th overall).)
5	129	New York Jets	Kirby Jackson	CB	Mississippi State	
5	130	Cincinnati Bengals	Marc Logan	RB	Kentucky	
5	131	Seattle Seahawks	Ruben Rodriguez	P	Arizona	
5	132	Miami Dolphins	Chris Conlin	T	Penn State	from Kansas City (Note: No. 132: Kansas City → Miami (D). See Round 5: Miami → Kansas City.)
5	133	Houston Oilers	Spencer Tillman	RB	Oklahoma	from LA Rams (Note: No. 133: LA Rams → Houston (PD). See Round 1: LA Rams → Houston.)
5	134	San Francisco 49ers	Paul Jokisch	WR	Michigan	
5	135	Tampa Bay Buccaneers	Henry Rolling	LB	Nevada	from New England (Note: No. 135: New England → Tampa Bay (D). New England traded a fifth-round selection (135th overall) to Tampa Bay in exchange for a 1988 fourth-round selection.)
5	136	Los Angeles Rams	Scott Mersereau	DT	Southern Connecticut State	from Cleveland (Note: No. 136: Cleveland → LA Rams (D). See Round 3: LA Rams → Cleveland.)
5	137	Tampa Bay Buccaneers	Tony Mayes	S	Kentucky	from Washington (Note: No. 137: Washington → Tampa Bay (PD). Washington traded a fifth-round selection (137th overall) to Tampa Bay in exchange for the rights to QB Doug Williams.)
5	138	Chicago Bears	Will Johnson	DE	Northeast Louisiana	
5	139	Cincinnati Bengals	Greg Horne	P	Arkansas	from Denver (Note: No. 139: Denver → Cincinnati (PD). Denver traded a fifth-round selection (139th overall), and 1986 first- and third-round selections to Cincinnati in exchange for the rights to LB Ricky Hunley.)
5	140	New York Giants	Paul O'Connor	G	Miami (FL)	
6	141	Pittsburgh Steelers	Tim Johnson	DT	Penn State	from Tampa Bay (Note: No. 141: Tampa Bay → Pittsburgh (PD). Tampa Bay traded a sixth-round selection (141st overall) to Pittsburgh in exchange for C Dan Turk.)
6	142	Indianapolis Colts	Freddie Robinson	S	Alabama	
6	143	Tampa Bay Buccaneers	Steve Bartalo	RB	Colorado State	from San Diego via Atlanta and San Diego (Note: No. 143: San Diego → Atlanta → San Diego → Tampa Bay. Multiple trades: San Diego → Atlanta (PD). San Diego traded a sixth-round selection (143rd overall) to Atlanta in exchange for LB Tom Benson. Atlanta → San Diego (PD). Atlanta traded a sixth-round selection (143rd overall) and LB Ronnie Washington to San Diego in exchange for QB Ed Luther. San Diego → Tampa Bay (PD). San Diego traded a sixth-round selection (143rd overall) to Tampa Bay in exchange for the rights to LB Andy Hawkins.)
6	144	Washington Redskins	Steve Gage	S	Tulsa	from Buffalo (Note: No. 144: Buffalo → Washington (D). See Round 4: Washington → Buffalo.)
6	145	Green Bay Packers	Willie Marshall	WR	Temple	
6	146	St. Louis Cardinals	Mark Garalczyk	DT	Western Michigan	
6	147	Houston Oilers	Al Smith ^{†}	LB	Utah State	
6	148	Detroit Lions	Danny Lockett	LB	Arizona	
6	149	Philadelphia Eagles	Ron Moten	LB	Florida	
6	150	Pittsburgh Steelers	Greg Lloyd ^{†}	LB	Fort Valley State	
6	151	Dallas Cowboys	Joe Onosai	G	Hawaii	
6	152	New Orleans Saints	Thomas Henley	WR	Stanford	
6	153	Atlanta Falcons	Paul Kiser	G	Wake Forest	
6	154	Chicago Bears	John Adickes	C	Baylor	from LA Raiders (Note: No. 154: LA Raiders → Chicago (D). See Round 4: Chicago → LA Raiders.)
6	155	Miami Dolphins	Lance Sellers	LB	Boise State	
6	156	Minnesota Vikings	Greg Richardson	WR	Alabama	
6	157	Cincinnati Bengals	Sonny Gordon	S	Ohio State	
6	158	Philadelphia Eagles	Chris Pike	DT	Tulsa	from Seattle (Note: No. 158: Seattle → Philadelphia (PD). Philadelphia traded a sixth-round selection (158th overall) to Seattle in exchange for G Greg Naron.)
6	159	Houston Oilers	Toby Caston	LB	LSU	from Kansas City (Note: No. 159: Kansas City → Houston (PD). Kansas City traded a sixth-round selection (159th overall) to Houston in exchange for RB Larry Moriarty.)
6	160	New York Giants	Tim Richardson	RB	Pacific	from LA Rams (Note: No. 160: LA Rams → NY Giants (PD). The LA Rams traded a sixth-round selection (160th overall) to the NY Giants in exchange for RB Rob Carpenter.)
6	161	New York Jets	Tracy Martin	WR	North Dakota	
6	162	San Francisco 49ers	Bob White	LB	Penn State	
6	163	New England Patriots	Gene Taylor	WR	Fresno State	
6	164	Washington Redskins	Ed Simmons	T	Eastern Washington	
6	165	Cleveland Browns	Stephen Braggs	CB	Texas	
6	166	Los Angeles Rams	Jon Embree	TE	Colorado	from Chicago (Note: No. 166: LA Rams → Chicago (D). See Round 3: Chicago → LA Rams.)
6	167	Denver Broncos	Warren Marshall	RB	James Madison	
6	168	New York Giants	Doug Riesenberg	T	California	
7	169	Tampa Bay Buccaneers	Curt Jarvis	DT	Alabama	
7	170	Indianapolis Colts	Mark Bellini	WR	BYU	
7	171	Buffalo Bills	Kerry Porter	RB	Washington State	
7	172	Green Bay Packers	Tony Leiker	DT	Stanford	
7	173	San Diego Chargers	Jamie Holland	WR	Ohio State	
7	174	St. Louis Cardinals	Tim Peoples	DB	Washington	
7	175	Detroit Lions	Dan Saleaumua ^{†}	DT	Arizona State	
7	176	Houston Oilers	Robert Banks	DT	Notre Dame	
7	177	Philadelphia Eagles	Brian Williams	T	Central Michigan	
7	178	Pittsburgh Steelers	Chris Kelley	TE	Akron	
7	179	New Orleans Saints	Gene Atkins	S	Florida A&M	
7	180	Dallas Cowboys	Kevin Sweeney	QB	Fresno State	
7	181	Atlanta Falcons	Michael Reid	LB	Wisconsin	
7	182	Miami Dolphins	Tom Brown	RB	Pittsburgh	
7	183	Los Angeles Raiders	Bo Jackson ^{†}	RB	Auburn	1985 Heisman Trophy winner
7	184	Seattle Seahawks	Roland Barbay	DT	LSU	from Minnesota (Note: No. 184: Minnesota → Seattle (PD). Minnesota traded a seventh-round selection (184th overall) to Seattle in exchange for S John Harris.)
7	185	Seattle Seahawks	Derek Tennell	TE	UCLA	
7	186	Kansas City Chiefs	Doug Hudson	QB	Nicholls State	
7	–	Philadelphia Eagles	from LA Rams; (Note: LA Rams → Philadelphia (PD). The LA Rams traded a seventh-round selection to Philadelphia in exchange for DE Dennis Harrison.)selection forfeited (Note: Philadelphia forfeited a seventh-round selection after selecting RB Charles Crawford in the 1986 supplemental draft.)			
7	187	New York Jets	Gerald Nichols	DT	Florida State	
7	188	Cincinnati Bengals	Chris Thatcher	G	Lafayette	
7	189	San Francisco 49ers	Steve DeLine	K	Colorado State	
7	190	Tampa Bay Buccaneers	Harry Swayne	T	Rutgers	from New England (Note: No. 190: New England → Tampa Bay (PD). See Round 2: New England → Tampa Bay.)
7	191	Green Bay Packers	Bill Smith	P	Ole Miss	from Cleveland (Note: No. 191: Cleveland → Green Bay (PD). Cleveland traded a seventh-round selection (191st overall) and the rights to LB Tommy Robison to Green Bay in exchange for WR John Jefferson.)
7	192	Washington Redskins	Johnny Thomas	CB	Baylor	
7	193	Chicago Bears	Archie Harris	T	William & Mary	
7	194	Denver Broncos	Wilbur Strozier	TE	Georgia	
7	195	St. Louis Cardinals	William Harris	TE	Bishop	from NY Giants (Note: No. 195: NY Giants → St. Louis (PD). See Round 2: NY Giants → St. Louis.)
8	196	New York Jets	Eddie Hunter	RB	Virginia Tech	from Tampa Bay (Note: No. 196: Tampa Bay → NY Jets (PD). Tampa Bay traded a conditional eighth-round selection (196th overall) to the NY Jets in exchange for OT Marvin Powell.)
8	197	Tampa Bay Buccaneers	Stan Mataele	DT	Arizona	from Indianapolis (Note: No. 197: Indianapolis → Tampa Bay (PD). Indianapolis traded an eighth-round selection (197th overall) to Tampa Bay in exchange for CB John Holt.)
8	198	Green Bay Packers	Jeff Drost	DT	Iowa	
8	199	San Diego Chargers	Joe MacEsker	T	UTEP	
8	200	Indianapolis Colts	Chuckie Miller	DB	UCLA	from Buffalo (Note: No. 200: Buffalo → Indianapolis (PD). Buffalo traded an eighth-round selection (200th overall) to Indianapolis in exchange for a 1988 eighth-round selection.)
8	201	St. Louis Cardinals	Steve Alvord	DT	Washington	
8	202	Houston Oilers	Michael James	WR	Washington State	
8	203	Detroit Lions	Dennis Gibson	LB	Iowa State	
8	204	San Diego Chargers	Ron Brown	LB	USC	from Philadelphia (Note: No. 204: Philadelphia → San Diego (PD). Philadelphia traded an eighth-round selection (204th overall) and a 1986 fourth-round selection to San Diego in exchange for RB Earnest Jackson.)
8	205	Pittsburgh Steelers	Charles Buchanan	DE	Tennessee State	
8	206	Dallas Cowboys	Kevin Gogan ^{†}	G	Washington	
8	207	New Orleans Saints	Toi Cook	CB	Stanford	
8	208	Atlanta Falcons	Curtis Taliaferro	LB	Virginia Tech	
8	209	Buffalo Bills	Bruce Mesner	DT	Maryland	from LA Raiders (Note: No. 209: LA Raiders → Buffalo (D). The LA Raiders traded an eighth-round selection (209th overall) to Buffalo in exchange for two tenth-round selections (254th and 273rd overall).)
8	210	Miami Dolphins	Joel Williams	TE	Notre Dame	
8	211	Minnesota Vikings	Rick Fenney	RB	Washington	
8	212	Miami Dolphins	Mark Dennis	T	Illinois	from Kansas City (Note: No. 212: Kansas City → Miami (D). See Round 5: Miami → Kansas City.)
8	213	Los Angeles Rams	Michael Stewart	DB	Fresno State	
8	214	New York Jets	Mike Rice	P	Montana	
8	215	Cincinnati Bengals	Solomon Wilcots	CB	Colorado	
8	216	Seattle Seahawks	Sammy Garza	QB	UTEP	
8	217	San Francisco 49ers	David Grayson	LB	Fresno State	
8	218	Kansas City Chiefs	Michael Clemons	RB	William & Mary	from New England (Note: No. 218: New England → Kansas City (PD). New England traded an eighth-round selection (218th overall) to Kansas City in exchange for TE Willie Scott.)
8	219	Washington Redskins	Clarence Vaughn	DB	Northern Illinois	
8	220	Cleveland Browns	Steve Bullitt	LB	Texas A&M	
8	221	Chicago Bears	Paul Migliazzo	LB	Oklahoma	
8	222	Denver Broncos	Dan Morgan	G	Penn State	
8	223	New York Giants	Rod Jones	TE	Washington	
9	224	Tampa Bay Buccaneers	Joe Armentrout	RB	Wisconsin	
9	225	New York Giants	Stan Parker	G	Nebraska	from Indianapolis (Note: No. 225: Indianapolis → NY Giants (PD). Indianapolis traded a ninth-round selection (225th overall) to the NY Giants in exchange for DB Kenny Daniel.)
9	226	San Diego Chargers	Thomas Wilcher	RB	Michigan	
9	227	Buffalo Bills	Keith McKeller	TE	Jacksonville State	
9	228	Green Bay Packers	Greg Harris	G	Wake Forest	
9	229	St. Louis Cardinals	Wayne Davis	LB	Alabama	
9	230	Detroit Lions	Rick Calhoun	RB	Cal State Fullerton	
9	231	Houston Oilers	Wes Neighbors	C	Alabama	
9	232	Philadelphia Eagles	Ken Lambiotte	QB	William & Mary	
9	233	Pittsburgh Steelers	Joey Clinkscales	WR	Tennessee	
9	234	New Orleans Saints	Scott Leach	LB	Ohio State	
9	235	Dallas Cowboys	Alvin Blount	RB	Maryland	
9	236	Atlanta Falcons	Terrence Anthony	DB	Iowa State	
9	237	Miami Dolphins	Tim Pidgeon	LB	Syracuse	
9	238	Los Angeles Raiders	Scott Eccles	TE	Eastern New Mexico	
9	239	Minnesota Vikings	Leonard Jones	DB	Texas Tech	
9	240	Los Angeles Rams	Tracy Ham	RB	Georgia Southern	
9	241	New York Jets	Ron McLean	DE	Cal State Fullerton	
9	242	Cincinnati Bengals	Craig Raddatz	LB	Wisconsin	
9	243	Seattle Seahawks	M. L. Johnson	LB	Hawaii	
9	244	Kansas City Chiefs	Randy Watts	DE	Catawba	
9	245	San Francisco 49ers	Jonathan Shelley	DB	Ole Miss	
9	246	Tampa Bay Buccaneers	Greg Davis	K	The Citadel	from New England (Note: No. 246: New England → Tampa Bay (PD). See Round 2: New England → Tampa Bay.)
9	247	Indianapolis Colts	Bob Ontko	LB	Penn State	from Cleveland (Note: No. 247: Cleveland → Indianapolis (PD). Cleveland traded a ninth-round selection (247th overall) in exchange for QB Mike Pagel.)
9	248	Washington Redskins	Alfred Jenkins	RB	Arizona	
9	249	Chicago Bears	Lakei Heimuli	RB	BYU	
9	250	Denver Broncos	Bruce Plummer	C	Mississippi State	
9	251	New York Giants	Dana Wright	RB	Findlay	
10	252	Tampa Bay Buccaneers	Mike Simmonds	G	Indiana State	
10	253	Indianapolis Colts	Chris Goode	CB	Alabama	
10	254	Los Angeles Raiders	Rob Harrison	DB	Sacramento State	from Buffalo (Note: No. 254: Buffalo → LA Raiders (D). See Round 8: LA Raiders → Buffalo.)
10	255	Green Bay Packers	Don Majkowski ^{†}	QB	Virginia	
10	256	San Diego Chargers	Anthony Anderson	S	Grambling State	
10	257	St. Louis Cardinals	Charles Wright	CB	Tulsa	
10	258	Houston Oilers	Curtis Duncan ^{†}	WR	Northwestern	
10	259	Detroit Lions	Raynard Brown	WR	South Carolina	
10	260	Philadelphia Eagles	Paul Carberry	DT	Oregon State	
10	261	Pittsburgh Steelers	Merril Hoge	RB	Idaho State	
10	262	Dallas Cowboys	Dale Jones	LB	Tennessee	
10	263	New Orleans Saints	Robert Clark	WR	North Carolina Central	
10	264	Atlanta Falcons	Jerry Reese	TE	Illinois	
10	265	Los Angeles Raiders	John Gesek	G	Sacramento State	
10	266	Miami Dolphins	Bobby Taylor	DB	Wisconsin	
10	267	Minnesota Vikings	Bob Riley	T	Indiana State	
10	268	New York Jets	Sid Lewis	CB	Penn State	
10	269	Cincinnati Bengals	David McCluskey	RB	Georgia	
10	270	Seattle Seahawks	Louis Clark	WR	Mississippi State	
10	271	Kansas City Chiefs	James Evans	RB	Southern	
10	272	Los Angeles Rams	David Smith	LB	Northern Arizona	
10	273	Los Angeles Raiders	Jim Ellis	LB	Boise State	from San Francisco via Buffalo (Note: No. 273: San Francisco → Buffalo → LA Raiders. Multiple trades: San Francisco → Buffalo (PD). San Francisco traded a tenth-round selection (273rd overall) and a 1986 first-round selection to Buffalo in exchange for 1986 second- and third-round selections. Buffalo → LA Raiders (D). See Round 8: LA Raiders → Buffalo.)
10	274	San Francisco 49ers	John Paye	QB	Stanford	from New England via LA Raiders (Note: No. 274: New England → LA Raiders → Washington. Multiple trades: New England → LA Raiders (D). See Round 3: New England → LA Raiders. LA Raiders → San Francisco (??). Unknown terms.)
10	275	Washington Redskins	Ted Wilson	WR	UCF	
10	276	Cleveland Browns	Frank Winters ^{†}	C	Western Illinois	
10	277	Chicago Bears	Dick Chapura	DT	Missouri	
10	278	Denver Broncos	Rafe Wilkinson	LB	Richmond	
10	279	New York Giants	Chuck Faucette	LB	Maryland	
11	280	Tampa Bay Buccaneers	Reggie Taylor	RB	Cincinnati	
11	281	Indianapolis Colts	Jim Reynosa	DE	Arizona State	
11	282	Green Bay Packers	Patrick Scott	WR	Grambling State	
11	283	Buffalo Bills	Howard Ballard	T	Alabama A&M	
11	284	San Diego Chargers	Joe Goebel	C	UCLA	
11	285	St. Louis Cardinals	Todd Peat	G	Northern Illinois	
11	286	Detroit Lions	Brian Siverling	TE	Penn State	
11	287	Houston Oilers	John Davis	G	Georgia Tech	
11	288	Los Angeles Raiders	Chris McLemore	RB	Arizona	from Philadelphia via San Francisco (Note: No. 288: Philadelphia → San Francisco → LA Raiders. Multiple trades: Philadelphia → San Francisco (PD). Philadelphia traded an eleventh-round selection (288th overall) to San Francisco in exchange for OT Joe Conwell. San Francisco → LA Raiders (??). Unknown terms.)
11	289	Pittsburgh Steelers	Paul Oswald	C	Kansas	
11	290	New Orleans Saints	Arthur Wells	TE	Grambling State	
11	291	Dallas Cowboys	Jeff Ward	K	Texas	
11	292	Atlanta Falcons	Elbert Shelley ^{†}	S	Arkansas State	
11	293	Miami Dolphins	Terence Mann	DT	SMU	
11	294	Los Angeles Raiders	Mario Perry	TE	Ole Miss	
11	295	Minnesota Vikings	Brent Pease	QB	Montana	
11	296	Cincinnati Bengals	Jim Warne	T	Arizona State	
11	297	Seattle Seahawks	Darryl Oliver	RB	Miami (FL)	
11	298	Kansas City Chiefs	Craig Richardson	WR	Eastern Washington	
11	299	Denver Broncos	Steve Roberts	DE	Washington	from LA Rams (Note: No. 299: LA Rams → Denver (PD). The LA Rams traded an eleventh-round selection (299th overall) and a 1988 seventh-round selection to Denver in exchange for LB Steve Busick.)
11	300	New York Jets	Kirk Timmer	LB	Montana State	
11	301	San Francisco 49ers	Calvin Nicholas	WR	Grambling State	
11	302	New England Patriots	Carlos Reveiz	K	Tennessee	
11	303	Cleveland Browns	Larry Brewton	DB	Temple	
11	304	Washington Redskins	Laron Brown	WR	Texas	
11	305	Chicago Bears	Tim Jessie	RB	Auburn	
11	306	Denver Broncos	Tommy Neal	RB	Maryland	
11	307	New York Giants	Dave Walter	QB	Michigan Tech	
12	308	Tampa Bay Buccaneers	Scott Cooper	DT	Kearney State	
12	309	Indianapolis Colts	David Adams	RB	Arizona	
12	310	San Diego Chargers	Marcus Greenwood	RB	UCLA	
12	311	Buffalo Bills	Joe McGrail	DT	Delaware	
12	312	Seattle Seahawks	Wes Dove	DE	Syracuse	from Green Bay (Note: No. 312: Green Bay → Seattle (PD). Green Bay traded a twelfth-round selection (312th overall) to Seattle in exchange for TE Dan Ross.)
12	313	Tampa Bay Buccaneers	Mike Shula	QB	Alabama	from St. Louis (Note: No. 313: St. Louis → Tampa Bay (PD). St. Louis traded a twelfth-round selection (313th overall) to Tampa Bay in exchange for LB Rick DiBernardo.)
12	314	Houston Oilers	Ira Valentine	RB	Texas A&M	
12	315	Detroit Lions	Gary Lee	WR	Georgia Tech	
12	316	Philadelphia Eagles	Bobby Morse	RB	Michigan State	
12	317	Pittsburgh Steelers	Theo Young	TE	Arkansas	
12	318	Dallas Cowboys	Scott Armstrong	LB	Florida	
12	319	New Orleans Saints	Tyrone Sorrells	G	Georgia Tech	
12	320	Atlanta Falcons	Larry Emery	RB	Wisconsin	
12	321	New York Giants	Bill Berthusen	DT	Iowa State	from LA Raiders (Note: No. 321: LA Raiders → NY Giants (D). The LA Raiders traded two twelfth-round selections (321st and 329th overall) to the NY Giants in exchange for a 1988 ninth-round selection.)
12	322	Miami Dolphins	Jim Karsatos	QB	Ohio State	
12	323	Minnesota Vikings	Keith Williams	DT	Florida	
12	324	Seattle Seahawks	Tony Burse	RB	Middle Tennessee State	
12	325	Kansas City Chiefs	Bruce Holmes	LB	Minnesota	
12	326	Los Angeles Rams	Alonzo Williams	RB	Mesa State	
12	327	New York Jets	Bill Ransdell	QB	Kentucky	
12	328	Cincinnati Bengals	John Holifield	RB	West Virginia	
12	329	New York Giants	Chad Stark	RB	North Dakota State	from San Francisco via LA Raiders (Note: No. 329: San Francisco → LA Raiders → NY Giants. Multiple trades: San Francisco → LA Raiders (??). Unknown terms. LA Raiders → NY Giants (D). See Round 12: LA Raiders → NY Giants.)
12	330	New England Patriots	Elgin Davis	RB	UCF	
12	331	Washington Redskins	Ray Hitchcock	C	Minnesota	
12	332	Los Angeles Rams	Fred Stokes	DE	Georgia Southern	from Cleveland (Note: No. 332: Cleveland → LA Rams (D). See Round 3: LA Rams → Cleveland.)
12	333	Chicago Bears	Eric Jeffries	CB	Texas	
12	334	Denver Broncos	Tyrone Braxton ^{†}	S	North Dakota State	
12	335	Green Bay Packers	Norman Jefferson	CB	LSU	from NY Giants (Note: No. 335: NY Giants → Green Bay (PD). The NY Giants traded a twelfth-round selection (335th overall) to Green Bay in exchange for WR Phil McConkey.)

== Supplemental draft ==
Rnd.	Pick	Team	Player	Pos.	College	Notes
1	—	Seattle Seahawks	Brian Bosworth	LB	Oklahoma	
3	—	Tampa Bay Buccaneers	Dan Sileo	DT	Miami (FL)	
4	—	Philadelphia Eagles	Cris Carter^{‡}^{†}	WR	Ohio State	

== Hall of Famers ==
- Rod Woodson, cornerback from Purdue, taken 1st round 10th overall by Pittsburgh Steelers

Inducted: Professional Football Hall of Fame class of 2009.

- Cris Carter, wide receiver from Ohio State, taken in supplemental draft 4th round by Philadelphia Eagles

Inducted: Professional Football Hall of Fame class of 2013.

== Notable undrafted players ==
†	Pro Bowler

Original NFL team	Player	Pos.	College	Notes
Atlanta Falcons	Milton Barney	WR	Alcorn State	
Atlanta Falcons	Tim Gordon	CB	Tulsa	
Atlanta Falcons	Ken Jordan	LB	Tuskegee	
Atlanta Falcons	Jerome Norris	S	Furman	
Atlanta Falcons	Tom Porell	DT	Boston College	
Atlanta Falcons	Bobby Riley	WR	Oklahoma State	
Atlanta Falcons	John Settle ^{†}	RB	Appalachian State	
Atlanta Falcons	Jessie Tuggle ^{†}	LB	Valdosta State	
Atlanta Falcons	Calvin Wallace	DE	West Virginia Tech	
Buffalo Bills	Cris D'Annunzio	S	Princeton	
Buffalo Bills	Sean Dowling	T	C. W. Post	
Buffalo Bills	Mitch Frerotte	G	Penn State	
Buffalo Bills	Mike Panepinto	RB	Canisius	
Buffalo Bills	Erik Rosenmeier	C	Colgate	
Chicago Bears	Kevin Brown	P	West Texas A&M	
Chicago Bears	Frank Harris	RB	NC State	
Chicago Bears	Tim Hendrix	TE	Tennessee	
Chicago Bears	Mike Hintz	CB/S	Wisconsin–Platteville	
Chicago Bears	Mike January	LB	Texas	
Chicago Bears	Bruce McCray	CB	Western Illinois	
Chicago Bears	Sean Payton	QB	Eastern Illinois	
Chicago Bears	Dave Romasko	TE	Carroll	
Chicago Bears	Doug Rothschild	LB	Wheaton	
Chicago Bears	Al Wolden	RB	Bemidji State	
Cincinnati Bengals	Dave Butler	LB	Notre Dame	
Cincinnati Bengals	John Carney ^{†}	K	Notre Dame	
Cincinnati Bengals	Tim Inglis	LB	Toledo	
Cincinnati Bengals	Massimo Manca	K	Penn State	
Cincinnati Bengals	Sam Manos	C	Marshall	
Cincinnati Bengals	Robert Niehoff	S	Cincinnati	
Cleveland Browns	Matt Battaglia	LB	Louisville	
Cleveland Browns	Albert Bell	WR	Alabama	
Cleveland Browns	Mike Cofer	K	NC State	
Cleveland Browns	John Fletcher	G	Texas A&I	
Cleveland Browns	Shawn Heffern	T	Notre Dame	
Cleveland Browns	Sam Johnson	WR	Prairie View A&M	
Cleveland Browns	Steve Pierce	WR	Illinois	
Cleveland Browns	Troy Wilson	CB	Notre Dame	
Cleveland Browns	George Winslow	P	Villanova	
Cleveland Browns	Terry Wright	CB	Temple	
Dallas Cowboys	Jimmy Armstrong	CB	Appalachian State	
Dallas Cowboys	Chris Barber	S	North Carolina A&T	
Dallas Cowboys	Rich Borresen	TE	Northwestern	
Dallas Cowboys	Kerry Brady	K	Hawaii	
Dallas Cowboys	Cornell Burbage	WR	Kentucky	
Dallas Cowboys	Ron Burton	LB	North Carolina	
Dallas Cowboys	Anthony Coleman	S	Baylor	
Dallas Cowboys	Alex Green	S	Indiana	
Dallas Cowboys	Jim Hendley	C	Florida State	
Dallas Cowboys	Jeff Hurd	LB	Kansas State	
Dallas Cowboys	Bob LeBlanc	LB	Elon	
Dallas Cowboys	Lorenzo Lynch	CB	Sacramento State	
Dallas Cowboys	Ray Perkins	DE	Virginia	
Dallas Cowboys	Ron Selesky	C	North Central	
Dallas Cowboys	Victor Simmons	LB	Central State	
Dallas Cowboys	Larry Smith	LB	Kentucky	
Dallas Cowboys	Loren Snyder	QB	Northern Colorado	
Dallas Cowboys	Sebron Spivey	WR	Southern Illinois	
Dallas Cowboys	Garth Thomas	T	Washington	
Dallas Cowboys	Scott Urch	T	Virginia	
Dallas Cowboys	Gerald White	RB	Michigan	
Dallas Cowboys	Mike Zentic	C	Oklahoma State	
Denver Broncos	Sam Graddy	WR	Tennessee	
Denver Broncos	Monte McGuire	QB	Texas Tech	
Denver Broncos	Matt Smith	LB	West Virginia	
Denver Broncos	Jeff Van Raaphorst	QB	Arizona State	
Detroit Lions	Karl Bernard	RB	Southwestern Louisiana	
Detroit Lions	Chris Geile	G	Eastern Illinois	
Detroit Lions	Jerry Quaerna	T	Michigan	
Detroit Lions	Chuck Steele	C	California	
Green Bay Packers	Todd Auer	LB	Western Illinois	
Green Bay Packers	Vincent Barnett	S/CB	Arkansas State	
Green Bay Packers	David Caldwell	DT	TCU	
Green Bay Packers	John Diettrich	K	Ball State	
Green Bay Packers	Tony Elliott	S	Central Michigan	
Green Bay Packers	Kevin Fitzgerald	TE	Wisconsin–Eau Claire	
Green Bay Packers	Anthony Harrison	S	Georgia Tech	
Green Bay Packers	Jim Hobbins	G	Minnesota	
Green Bay Packers	Craig Jay	TE	Mount Senario	
Green Bay Packers	Ed Konopasek	T	Ball State	
Green Bay Packers	Chris Mandeville	S	UC Davis	
Green Bay Packers	Aaron Manning	CB	Iowa State	
Green Bay Packers	John McGarry	G	Saint Joseph's	
Green Bay Packers	Lee Morris	WR	Oklahoma	
Green Bay Packers	Keith Paskett	WR	Western Kentucky	
Green Bay Packers	Martin Rudolph	CB	Arizona	
Green Bay Packers	John Sterling	RB	Central State (OK)	
Green Bay Packers	Chuck Washington	CB	Arkansas	
Green Bay Packers	Kevin Willhite	RB	Oregon	
Houston Oilers	Craig Birdsong	S	North Texas State	
Houston Oilers	Chris Darrington	WR	Weber State	
Houston Oilers	Joe DeForest	LB	Southwestern Louisiana	
Houston Oilers	Scott Fox	LB	Austin Peay	
Houston Oilers	Andrew Jackson	RB	Iowa State	
Houston Oilers	Thad Jefferson	LB	Hawaii	
Houston Oilers	Larry Joyner	S	Minnesota	
Houston Oilers	Eugene Seale	LB	Lamar	
Houston Oilers	Donovan Small	S	Minnesota	
Indianapolis Colts	John Brandes	TE	Cameron	
Indianapolis Colts	Jeff Criswell	T	Graceland	
Indianapolis Colts	Travis Simpson	C	Oklahoma	
Kansas City Chiefs	Mel Anderson	WR	Minnesota	
Kansas City Chiefs	Darrell Colbert	WR	Texas Southern	
Kansas City Chiefs	Alex Espinoza	QB	Iowa State	
Kansas City Chiefs	Jeff Faulkner	DE	Southern	
Kansas City Chiefs	James Harvey	G	Jackson State	
Kansas City Chiefs	Byron Ingram	G	Eastern Kentucky	
Kansas City Chiefs	Sidney Johnson	CB	California	
Kansas City Chiefs	Stein Koss	TE	Arizona State	
Kansas City Chiefs	Mark Nelson	T	Bowling Green	
Kansas City Chiefs	Teddy Nelson	S	UNLV	
Kansas City Chiefs	Matt Stevens	QB	UCLA	
Los Angeles Rams	Sam Anno	LB	USC	
Los Angeles Rams	Mark Boggs	T	Ball State	
Los Angeles Rams	Richard Brown	LB	San Diego State	
Los Angeles Rams	Chuck Compton	CB/S	Boise State	
Los Angeles Rams	Kwante Hampton	WR	Long Beach State	
Los Angeles Rams	Suge Knight	DE	UNLV	
Los Angeles Rams	Tim Lashar	K	Oklahoma	
Los Angeles Rams	Stacey Mobley	WR	Jackson State	
Los Angeles Rams	Keith Tinsley	WR	Pittsburgh	
Los Angeles Rams	Greg Williamson	CB	Fresno State	
Miami Dolphins	Clarence Bailey	RB	Hampton	
Miami Dolphins	Willie Beecher	K	Utah State	
Miami Dolphins	Leland Douglas	WR	Baylor	
Miami Dolphins	Ian Howfield	K	Tennessee	
Miami Dolphins	Vernice Smith	G	Florida A&M	
Minnesota Vikings	Dale Dawson	K	Eastern Kentucky	
Minnesota Vikings	Jim Dick	LB	North Dakota State	
Minnesota Vikings	Jeff Womack	RB	Memphis State	
New England Patriots	Ricky Atkinson	CB	Southern Connecticut State	
New England Patriots	Bob Bleier	QB	Richmond	
New England Patriots	Ken Brown	WR	Southern Arkansas	
New England Patriots	Duffy Cobbs	CB	Penn State	
New England Patriots	Dennis Gadbois	WR	Boston University	
New England Patriots	Bruce Hansen	RB	BYU	
New England Patriots	Al Herline	P	Vanderbilt	
New England Patriots	Jerry McCabe	LB	Holy Cross	
New England Patriots	Joe Peterson	CB	Nevada	
New England Patriots	Scott Schutt	LB	North Dakota State	
New England Patriots	Darren Twombly	C	Boston College	
New England Patriots	Todd Whitten	QB	Stephen F. Austin	
New Orleans Saints	Ted Elliott	DT	Mankato State	
New Orleans Saints	Walt Housman	T	Upsala	
New Orleans Saints	Vince Jasper	G	Iowa State	
New Orleans Saints	Erik Kramer	QB	NC State	
New Orleans Saints	Les Miller	DE	Fort Hays State	
New Orleans Saints	Dan Rice	RB	Michigan	
New Orleans Saints	Derrick Taylor	S	NC State	
New Orleans Saints	Junior Thurman	CB	USC	
New Orleans Saints	Ron Weissenhofer	LB	Notre Dame	
New York Giants	Toney Catchings	LB	Cincinnati	
New York Giants	Jim Crocicchia	QB	Penn	
New York Giants	Robert DiRico	RB	Kutztown	
New York Giants	Wayne Haddix ^{†}	CB	Liberty	
New York Giants	Chris Jones	C	Delaware State	
New York Giants	Randy Kirk	LB	San Diego State	
New York Giants	Brian Sisley	DE	South Dakota State	
New York Jets	John Chirico	RB	Columbia	
New York Jets	Anthony Corvino	T	Southern Connecticut State	
New York Jets	Bobby Curtis	LB	Savannah State	
New York Jets	Greg Jensen	G		
Philadelphia Eagles	Curt Baham	DB	Tulane	
Philadelphia Eagles	John Klingel	DE	Eastern Kentucky	
Philadelphia Eagles	Mike Kullman	WR	Kutztown	
Pittsburgh Steelers	Lyneal Alston	WR	Southern Miss	
Pittsburgh Steelers	Steve Apke	LB	Pittsburgh	
Pittsburgh Steelers	Warren Bone	DE	Texas Southern	
Pittsburgh Steelers	Dennis Borcky	DT	Memphis State	
Pittsburgh Steelers	Lee Getz	G	Rutgers	
Pittsburgh Steelers	Jeff Lucas	T	West Virginia	
Pittsburgh Steelers	Bob McDonough	CB/S	California (PA)	
Pittsburgh Steelers	Dwight Stone	RB	Middle Tennessee State	
Pittsburgh Steelers	Joe Williams	LB	Grambling State	
St. Louis Cardinals	Adrian Breen	QB	Morehead State	
St. Louis Cardinals	Tony Buford	LB	Tulsa	
St. Louis Cardinals	Eric Brown	WR	Tulsa	
St. Louis Cardinals	Peter Tuiasosopo	C	Utah State	
St. Louis Cardinals	Shawn Halloran	QB	Boston College	
San Diego Chargers	David Diaz-Infante	G	San Jose State	
San Diego Chargers	Jeff Gaffney	K	Virginia	
San Diego Chargers	James Hall	LB	Northwestern State	
San Diego Chargers	Fred Jones	LB	Florida State	
San Diego Chargers	Tyronne Stowe	LB	Rutgers	
San Francisco 49ers	Tommy Dawkins	DE	Appalachian State	
San Francisco 49ers	Doug DuBose	RB	Nebraska	
San Francisco 49ers	Tony Gladney	WR	UNLV	
San Francisco 49ers	Greg Liter	DE	Iowa State	
Seattle Seahawks	Brant Bengen	WR	Idaho	
Seattle Seahawks	Ron Bohm	DT	Illinois	
Seattle Seahawks	Scott Hagler	K	South Carolina	
Seattle Seahawks	Matt Hanousek	T	Utah State	
Seattle Seahawks	David Hollis	CB	UNLV	
Seattle Seahawks	Dallis Smith	S	Valdosta State	
Seattle Seahawks	Daryle Smith	T	Tennessee	
Seattle Seahawks	Donald Snell	WR	Virginia Tech	
Tampa Bay Buccaneers	Brian Gant	LB	Illinois State	
Tampa Bay Buccaneers	Steve Holloway	TE	Tennessee State	
Tampa Bay Buccaneers	Mike Kovaleski	LB	Notre Dame	
Tampa Bay Buccaneers	Ray Isom	S	Penn State	
Tampa Bay Buccaneers	David Jackson	WR	Southeast Missouri State	
Tampa Bay Buccaneers	Dan Land	S	Albany State	
Tampa Bay Buccaneers	Tom McHale	G	Cornell	
Tampa Bay Buccaneers	Jeff Modesitt	TE	Delaware	
Tampa Bay Buccaneers	Billy Poe	G	Morehead State	
Tampa Bay Buccaneers	Kevin Thomas	C	Arizona State	
Tampa Bay Buccaneers	Mike Varajon	RB	Toledo	
Washington Redskins	Darrick Brilz	C/G	Oregon State	
Washington Redskins	Danny Burmeister	S	North Carolina	
Washington Redskins	Mark Carlson	T	Southern Connecticut State	
Washington Redskins	Eric Coyle	C	Colorado	
Washington Redskins	David Etherly	CB	Portland State	
Washington Redskins	Ted Karras Jr.	DT	Northwestern	
Washington Redskins	Craig McEwen	TE	Utah	
Washington Redskins	Steve Nave	LB	Kansas	
Washington Redskins	Keith Radecic	C	Penn State	
Washington Redskins	Ed Rubbert	QB	Louisville	
Washington Redskins	Tony Settles	LB	Elon	
Washington Redskins	Derrick Shepard	WR	Oklahoma	
Washington Redskins	Steve Thompson	DT	Minnesota	

== Trades ==
In the explanations below, (D) denotes trades that took place during the 1987 Draft, while (PD) indicates trades completed pre-draft.

Round 1

Round 2

Round 3

Round 4

Round 5

Round 6

Round 7

Round 8

Round 9

Round 10

Round 11

Round 12

== Forfeited picks ==
One selection in the 1987 draft was forfeited:
