= Otis Washington =

American football player and coach

Biographical details
- Born: February 12, 1939; Selma, Alabama, U.S.
- Died: May 24, 2019 (aged 80)

Playing career
- 1959: Xavier (LA)
- Positions: Offensive guard, linebacker

Coaching career (HC unless noted)
- 1969–1979: St. Augustine HS (LA)
- 1980: LSU (OL)
- 1981–1986: Southern

Head coaching record
- Overall: 35–30–1 (college); 113–17–1 (high school)

Accomplishments and honors

Championships
- 3 Louisiana state (1975, 1978–1979)

Otis J. Washington Jr. (February 12, 1939 – May 24, 2019) was an American football coach.

== Biography ==
Washington was born on February 12, 1939, in Selma, Alabama. He graduated from Xavier University of Louisiana in 1961, where he earned all-conference honors in football and baseball and was captain of school's final football team, in 1959.

He served as the head football coach at Southern University in Baton Rouge, Louisiana from 1981 to 1986, compiling a record of 35–30–1. Washington was the head football coach at St. Augustine High School in New Orleans, from 1969 to 1979, amassing a record of 113–17–1 and leading his teams to three Louisiana state titles, in 1975, 1978, and 1979.

Washington died on May 24, 2019.

== Head coaching record ==
=== College ===
Year	Team	Overall	Conference	Standing	Bowl/playoffs
Southern Jaguars (Southwestern Athletic Conference) (1981–1986)
1981	Southern	3–8	2–4	T–5th	
1982	Southern	8–3	5–1	2nd	
1983	Southern	7–4	5–2	T–2nd	
1984	Southern	6–5	4–3	4th	
1985	Southern	6–5	3–4	5th	
1986	Southern	5–5–1	2–4	T–3rd	
Southern:		35–30–1	21–18		
Total:		35–30–1			
