= 1986 Alabama State Hornets football team =

American college football season

1986 Alabama State Hornets football
- Conference: Southwestern Athletic Conference
- Record: 4–7 (2–5 SWAC)
- Head coach: Willie Parker (5th season)
- Home stadium: Cramton Bowl

1986 Southwestern Athletic Conference football standings
	Conf.					Overall
Team	W		L		T	W		L		T
No. 9 Jackson State $^	7	–	0	–	0	9	–	3	–	0
Alcorn State	5	–	2	–	0	5	–	5	–	0
Grambling State	4	–	3	–	0	7	–	4	–	0
Southern	4	–	3	–	0	5	–	5	–	1
Mississippi Valley State	3	–	3	–	1	4	–	4	–	1
Alabama State	2	–	5	–	0	4	–	7	–	0
Texas Southern	1	–	5	–	1	2	–	8	–	1
Prairie View A&M	1	–	6	–	0	3	–	8	–	0
$ – Conference champion; ^ – NCAA Division I-AA playoff participant; Rankings from NCAA Division I-AA Football Committee poll

The 1986 Alabama State Hornets football team represented Alabama State University as a member of the Southwestern Athletic Conference (SWAC) during the 1986 NCAA Division I-AA football season. Led by fifth-year head coach Willie Parker, the Hornets compiled an overall record of 4–7, with a mark of 2–5 in conference play, and finished sixth in the SWAC.

== Schedule ==
Date	Opponent	Site	Result	Attendance	Source
September 6	Jackson State	Cramton Bowl; Montgomery, AL	L 20–26		
September 13	at Southern	A. W. Mumford Stadium; Baton Rouge, LA	L 9–27	15,000	
September 20	at Alcorn State	Henderson Stadium; Lorman, MS	L 17–24		
September 27	vs. Texas Southern	Ladd Stadium; Mobile, AL (Gulf Coast Classic)	W 35–31		
October 11	Fort Valley State*	Cramton Bowl; Montgomery, AL	L 21–24		
October 18	at Albany State*	Hugh Mills Stadium; Albany, GA	W 14–0		
October 25	at Prairie View A&M	Edward L. Blackshear Field; Prairie View, TX	W 20–14		
November 1	vs. Alabama A&M*	Legion Field; Birmingham, AL (Magic City Classic)	L 17–20	32,000	
November 8	at Grambling State	Eddie G. Robinson Memorial Stadium; Grambling, LA	L 7–16	4,798	
November 15	at Mississippi Valley State	Magnolia Stadium; Itta Bena, MS	L 3–19	500	
November 27	Clark (GA)*	Cramton Bowl; Montgomery, AL	W 21–6	5,000	
*Non-conference game
