= 1986 Mississippi Valley State Delta Devils football team =

American college football season

1986 Mississippi Valley State Delta Devils football
- Conference: Southwestern Athletic Conference
- Record: 4–4–1 (3–3–1 SWAC)
- Head coach: Archie Cooley (7th season)
- Home stadium: Magnolia Stadium

1986 Southwestern Athletic Conference football standings
	Conf.					Overall
Team	W		L		T	W		L		T
No. 9 Jackson State $^	7	–	0	–	0	9	–	3	–	0
Alcorn State	5	–	2	–	0	5	–	5	–	0
Grambling State	4	–	3	–	0	7	–	4	–	0
Southern	4	–	3	–	0	5	–	5	–	1
Mississippi Valley State	3	–	3	–	1	4	–	4	–	1
Alabama State	2	–	5	–	0	4	–	7	–	0
Texas Southern	1	–	5	–	1	2	–	8	–	1
Prairie View A&M	1	–	6	–	0	3	–	8	–	0
$ – Conference champion; ^ – NCAA Division I-AA playoff participant; Rankings from NCAA Division I-AA Football Committee poll

The 1986 Mississippi Valley State Delta Devils football team represented Mississippi Valley State University as a member of the Southwestern Athletic Conference (SWAC) during the 1986 NCAA Division I-AA football season. Led by seventh-year head coach Archie Cooley, the Delta Devils compiled an overall record of 4–4–1, with a conference record of 3–3–1, and finished fifth in the SWAC.

== Schedule ==
Date	Opponent	Site	Result	Attendance	Source
September 6	Alabama A&M*	Magnolia Stadium; Itta Bena, MS	W 42–21		
September 27	at No. 18 Jackson State	Mississippi Veterans Memorial Stadium; Jackson, MS	L 8–26		
October 4	at Southern	A. W. Mumford Stadium; Baton Rouge, LA	L 7–28		
October 11	at North Carolina A&T*	Aggie Stadium; Greensboro, NC	L 14–20	18,000	
October 18	vs. Grambling State	Ladd Memorial Stadium; Mobile, AL	W 13–10	16,454	
October 25	at Texas Southern	Rice Stadium; Houston, TX	T 34–34		
November 1	Prairie View A&M	Magnolia Stadium; Itta Bena, MS	W 28–21		
November 9	vs. Alcorn State	Mississippi Veterans Memorial Stadium; Jackson, MS	L 13–17		
November 15	Alabama State	Magnolia Stadium; Itta Bena, MS	W 19–3	500	
*Non-conference game; Rankings from NCAA Division I-AA Football Committee Poll released prior to the game
