= Conway Hayman =

American football player (1949–2020)

No. 70
- Position: Guard

Personal information
- Born: January 9, 1949; Newark, Delaware, U.S.
- Died: March 7, 2020 (aged 71); La Porte, Texas, U.S.
- Listed height: 6 ft 3 in (1.91 m)
- Listed weight: 264 lb (120 kg)

Career information
- High school: Newark (DE)
- College: Delaware (1968–1970)
- NFL draft: 1971: 6th round, 141st overall pick

Career history

Playing
- New England Patriots (1972–1973)*; Los Angeles Rams (1974)*; Houston Oilers (1975–1980)
- * Offseason or practice squad member only

Coaching
- Prairie View A&M (1981–1983) Offensive coordinator; Prairie View A&M (1984–1987) Head coach; Florida A&M (1988) Offensive line; Texas Southern (1989) Offensive coordinator

Awards and highlights
- As a player: First-team Little All-American (1970); Delaware Sports Hall of Fame

Career NFL statistics
- Games played: 77
- Games started: 49
- Fumble recoveries: 1
- Stats at Pro Football Reference

Head coaching record
- Career: 5–31–1 (.149)

Conway Holmes Hayman (January 9, 1949 – March 7, 2020) was an American professional football player and coach. He played as a guard in college and professionally and later became a collegiate head football coach.

== Playing career ==
=== University of Delaware ===
Hayman was a lineman at the University of Delaware in Newark where he played from 1968 through the 1970 seasons. Hayman's Blue Hens garnered three consecutive Lambert Cup titles, three straight Boardwalk Bowl wins, and two straight Middle Atlantic Conference championships. Hayman was a consensus first-team All-American and All-East selection at offensive guard in 1970 and was a two-time All-MAC selection. From his accomplishments at Delaware, Hayman was inducted into the state of Delaware Sports Hall of Fame. Hayman was the second athlete from the school to play in the NFL.

=== Houston Oilers ===
Hayman was drafted in the sixth round with 141st overall pick in the 1971 NFL draft by the Washington Redskins and subsequently traded to the Houston Oilers. He played for six seasons with the Oilers, appearing in a total of 77 regular season games.

== Coaching career ==
=== Prairie View A&M ===
Hayman was the 15th head football at the Prairie View A&M University in Prairie View, Texas, serving for four seasons, from 1983 to 1986, and compiling a record of 5–36.

=== Assistant coaching ===
Hayman served as an assistant at Texas Southern University and Florida A&M University.

== Honors ==
In 1986 the Delaware Sports Hall of Fame inducted Hayman.

== Head coaching record ==
Year	Team	Overall	Conference	Standing	Bowl/playoffs
Prairie View A&M Panthers (Southwestern Athletic Conference) (1984–1987)
1984	Prairie View A&M	0–11	0–7	8th	
1985	Prairie View A&M	2–9	0–7	8th	
1986	Prairie View A&M	3–8	1–6	8th	
1987	Prairie View A&M	0–3–1			
Prairie View A&M:		5–31–1			
Total:		5–31–1			
