= Tony Gladney =

American football player (born 1964)

No. 17
- Position: Wide receiver

Personal information
- Born: July 20, 1964 (age 62); San Mateo, California, U.S.
- Listed height: 6 ft 3 in (1.91 m)
- Listed weight: 200 lb (91 kg)

Career information
- High school: San Mateo
- College: UNLV
- NFL draft: 1987: undrafted

Career history
- San Francisco 49ers (1987)

Career NFL statistics
- Receptions: 4
- Receiving yards: 60
- Stats at Pro Football Reference

Anthony Lamont Gladney (born July 20, 1964) is an American former professional football player who was a wide receiver for one season with the San Francisco 49ers of the National Football League (NFL). He played college football for the UNLV Rebels.

== Early life and college ==
Anthony Lamont Gladney was born on July 20, 1964, in San Mateo, California. He attended San Mateo High School in San Mateo.

Gladney played college football for the UNLV Rebels of the University of Nevada, Las Vegas. He was a letterman in 1983, 1984, and 1986. He was declared ineligible for the 1985 season after it was discovered that he had been admitted to UNLV despite having a high school GPA of under 2.0, in violation of NCAA rules. Gladney caught 12 passes for 261 yards and one touchdown in 1983, 38 passes for 641 yards and eight touchdowns in 1984, and 27 passes for 391 yards and four touchdowns in 1986.

== Professional career ==
After going undrafted in the 1987 NFL draft, Gladney signed with the San Francisco 49ers on May 12. He was released on August 24. On September 23, Gladney re-signed with the 49ers during the 1987 NFL players strike. He played in two games for the 49ers, recording four receptions for 60 yards, before being released on October 19, 1987.

== Personal life ==
Gladney later became the Vice President of Diversity, Equity and Inclusion for MGM Resorts International.
