= 1986 Prairie View A&M Panthers football team =

American college football season

1986 Prairie View A&M Panthers football
- Conference: Southwestern Athletic Conference
- Record: 3–8 (1–6 SWAC)
- Head coach: Conway Hayman (3rd season)
- Offensive coordinator: Haney Catchings (1st season)
- Defensive coordinator: Ronald Beard (3rd season)
- Home stadium: Edward L. Blackshear Field

1986 Southwestern Athletic Conference football standings
	Conf.					Overall
Team	W		L		T	W		L		T
No. 9 Jackson State $^	7	–	0	–	0	9	–	3	–	0
Alcorn State	5	–	2	–	0	5	–	5	–	0
Grambling State	4	–	3	–	0	7	–	4	–	0
Southern	4	–	3	–	0	5	–	5	–	1
Mississippi Valley State	3	–	3	–	1	4	–	4	–	1
Alabama State	2	–	5	–	0	4	–	7	–	0
Texas Southern	1	–	5	–	1	2	–	8	–	1
Prairie View A&M	1	–	6	–	0	3	–	8	–	0
$ – Conference champion; ^ – NCAA Division I-AA playoff participant; Rankings from NCAA Division I-AA Football Committee poll

The 1986 Prairie View A&M Panthers football team represented Prairie View A&M University as a member of the Southwestern Athletic Conference (SWAC) during the 1986 NCAA Division I-AA football season. Led by third-year head coach Conway Hayman, the Panthers compiled an overall record of 3–8 and a mark of 1–6 in conference play, and finished eighth in the SWAC.

== Schedule ==
Date	Opponent	Site	Result	Attendance	Source
September 1	at Texas Southern	Astrodome; Houston, TX (Labor Day Classic)	L 35–38		
September 6	at McNeese State*	Cowboy Stadium; Lake Charles, LA	L 24–57	19,778	
September 13	at Stephen F. Austin*	Homer Bryce Stadium; Nacogdoches, TX	L 14–46		
September 20	at Jackson State	Mississippi Veterans Memorial Stadium; Jackson, MS	L 24–32		
September 27	at Southern	A. W. Mumford Stadium; Baton Rouge, LA	L 14–21		
October 4	vs. No. 13 Grambling State	Cotton Bowl; Dallas, TX (State Fair Classic)	W 24–19	33,480	
October 11	vs. Bishop*	Texas Memorial Stadium; Austin, TX (State Capitol Football Classic)	W 44–21	11,450	
October 18	Texas Lutheran*	Edward L. Blackshear Field; Prairie View, TX	W 28–18		
October 25	Alabama State	Edward L. Blackshear Field; Prairie View, TX	L 14–20		
November 1	at Mississippi Valley State	Magnolia Stadium; Itta Bena, MS	L 21–28		
November 15	Alcorn State	Edward L. Blackshear Field; Prairie View, TX	L 20–35		
*Non-conference game; Rankings from NCAA Division I-AA Football Committee Poll released prior to the game
