= 1986 James Madison Dukes football team =

American college football season

1986 James Madison Dukes football
- Conference: Independent
- Record: 5–5–1
- Head coach: Joe Purzycki (2nd season)
- Home stadium: JMU Stadium

1986 NCAA Division I-AA independents football standings
	Conf.			Overall
Team	W	L	T	W		L		T
No. 4 Georgia Southern ^		–		13	–	2	–	0
No. 14 Tennessee State ^		–		10	–	2	–	1
No. 8 William & Mary ^		–		9	–	3	–	0
Eastern Washington		–		5	–	5	–	0
James Madison		–		5	–	5	–	1
Florida A&M		–		5	–	6	–	0
Northeastern		–		4	–	6	–	0
Western Kentucky		–		4	–	6	–	1
^ – NCAA Division I-AA playoff participant; Rankings from NCAA Division I-AA Football Committee poll

The 1986 James Madison Dukes football team was an American football team that represented James Madison University during the 1986 NCAA Division I-AA football season as an independent. In their second year under head coach Joe Purzycki, the team compiled a 5–5–1 record.

== Schedule ==
Date	Opponent	Site	Result	Attendance	Source
September 6	UMass	JMU Stadium; Harrisonburg, VA	L 14–16	12,400	
September 13	at Morehead State	Jayne Stadium; Morehead, KY	L 24–27	4,300	
September 20	at Liberty	City Stadium; Lynchburg, VA	L 7–17		
September 27	VMI	JMU Stadium; Harrisonburg, VA	W 39–7	11,019	
October 4	Saint Paul's (VA)	JMU Stadium; Harrisonburg, VA	W 62–0	14,100	
October 18	Appalachian State	JMU Stadium; Harrisonburg, VA	L 20–21	12,600	
October 25	at No. 3 William & Mary	Cary Field; Williamsburg, VA (rivalry)	W 42–33	7,500	
November 1	at Northeastern	Parsons Field; Brookline, MA	W 15–2	4,010	
November 8	East Tennessee State	JMU Stadium; Harrisonburg, VA	W 34–3	7,800	
November 15	at No. 5 Georgia Southern	Paulson Stadium; Statesboro, GA	L 35–45	16,135	
November 22	at Towson State	Minnegan Stadium; Towson, MD	T 7–7	4,684	
Rankings from NCAA Division I-AA Football Committee Poll released prior to the game
