= 1986 Western Kentucky Hilltoppers football team =

American college football season

1986 Western Kentucky Hilltoppers football
- Conference: Independent
- Record: 4–6–1
- Head coach: Dave Roberts (3rd season)
- Home stadium: L. T. Smith Stadium

1986 NCAA Division I-AA independents football standings
	Conf.			Overall
Team	W	L	T	W		L		T
No. 4 Georgia Southern ^		–		13	–	2	–	0
No. 14 Tennessee State ^		–		10	–	2	–	1
No. 8 William & Mary ^		–		9	–	3	–	0
Eastern Washington		–		5	–	5	–	0
James Madison		–		5	–	5	–	1
Florida A&M		–		5	–	6	–	0
Northeastern		–		4	–	6	–	0
Western Kentucky		–		4	–	6	–	1
^ – NCAA Division I-AA playoff participant; Rankings from NCAA Division I-AA Football Committee poll

The 1986 Western Kentucky Hilltoppers football team represented Western Kentucky University as an independent during the 1986 NCAA Division I-AA football season. Led by third-year head coach Dave Roberts, the Hilltoppers compiled a record of 4–6–1.

== Schedule ==
Date	Opponent	Site	Result	Attendance	Source
September 6	Gardner–Webb	L. T. Smith Stadium; Bowling Green, KY	W 35–13	11,000	
September 13	Livingston	L. T. Smith Stadium; Bowling Green, KY	L 21–23	7,500	
September 20	at Louisville	Cardinal Stadium; Louisville, KY	L 6–45	34,144	
September 27	at Murray State	Roy Stewart Stadium; Murray, KY (Battle for the Red Belt)	T 10–10	8,875	
October 4	Eastern Kentucky	L. T. Smith Stadium; Bowling Green, KY (Battle of the Bluegrass)	W 24–10	9,300	
October 18	at Tennessee State	Vanderbilt Stadium; Nashville, TN	L 3–25	26,684	
October 25	at Austin Peay	Municipal Stadium; Clarksville, TN	W 34–20	3,117	
November 1	No. 9 Georgia Southern^{†}	L. T. Smith Stadium; Bowling Green, KY	L 32–49	13,000	
November 8	Boston University	L. T. Smith Stadium; Bowling Green, KY	W 28–7	1,500	
November 15	at No. 4 Eastern Illinois	O'Brien Field; Charleston, IL	L 18–35	6,020	
November 22	Chattanooga	L. T. Smith Stadium; Bowling Green, KY	L 17–21	4,000	
^{†}Homecoming; Rankings from NCAA Division I-AA Football Committee Poll released prior to the game
