= 1986 Alcorn State Braves football team =

American college football season

1986 Alcorn State Braves football
- Conference: Southwestern Athletic Conference
- Record: 5–5 (5–2 SWAC)
- Head coach: Theophilus Danzy (1st season)
- Home stadium: Henderson Stadium

1986 Southwestern Athletic Conference football standings
	Conf.					Overall
Team	W		L		T	W		L		T
No. 9 Jackson State $^	7	–	0	–	0	9	–	3	–	0
Alcorn State	5	–	2	–	0	5	–	5	–	0
Grambling State	4	–	3	–	0	7	–	4	–	0
Southern	4	–	3	–	0	5	–	5	–	1
Mississippi Valley State	3	–	3	–	1	4	–	4	–	1
Alabama State	2	–	5	–	0	4	–	7	–	0
Texas Southern	1	–	5	–	1	2	–	8	–	1
Prairie View A&M	1	–	6	–	0	3	–	8	–	0
$ – Conference champion; ^ – NCAA Division I-AA playoff participant; Rankings from NCAA Division I-AA Football Committee poll

The 1986 Alcorn State Braves football team represented Alcorn State University as a member of the Southwestern Athletic Conference (SWAC) during the 1986 NCAA Division I-AA football season. Led by first-year head coach Theophilus Danzy, the Braves compiled an overall record of 5–5, with a conference record of 5–2, and finished second in the SWAC.

== Schedule ==
Date	Opponent	Site	Result	Attendance	Source
September 6	Stephen F. Austin*	Henderson Stadium; Lorman, MS	L 14–28	3,624	
September 13	vs. Grambling State	Independence Stadium; Shreveport, LA (Red River Classic)	L 17–19	21,016	
September 20	Alabama State	Henderson Stadium; Lorman, MS	W 24–17		
October 4	at South Carolina State*	Oliver C. Dawson Stadium; Orangeburg, SC	L 10–20	7.012	
October 11	Texas Southern	Henderson Stadium; Lorman, MS	W 35–33		
October 18	vs. Florida A&M*	Miami Orange Bowl; Miami, FL (Orange Blossom Classic)	L 30–33	17,327	
October 25	Southern	Henderson Stadium; Lorman, MS	W 14–13	10,699	
November 9	vs. Mississippi Valley State	Mississippi Veterans Memorial Stadium; Jackson, MS	W 17–13		
November 15	at Prairie View A&M	Edward L. Blackshear Field; Prairie View, TX	W 35–20		
November 22	at No. 10 Jackson State	Mississippi Veterans Memorial Stadium; Jackson, MS (rivalry)	L 17–23	20,000	
*Non-conference game; Rankings from NCAA Division I-AA Football Committee Poll released prior to the game
