= Chad Stark =

American football player (born 1965)

No. 37
- Position: Running back

Personal information
- Born: April 4, 1965 (age 61); Decorah, Iowa, U.S.
- Listed height: 6 ft 1 in (1.85 m)
- Listed weight: 220 lb (100 kg)

Career information
- High school: Brookings
- College: North Dakota State
- NFL draft: 1987: 12th round, 329th overall pick

Career history
- New York Giants (1987)*; Saskatchewan Roughriders (1987)*; Seattle Seahawks (1987); Miami Dolphins (1988)
- * Offseason or practice squad member only

Career NFL statistics
- Games played: 2
- Stats at Pro Football Reference

Chad William Stark (born April 4, 1965) is an American former professional football player who was a running back for two games with the Seattle Seahawks of the National Football League (NFL) in 1987. He played college football for the North Dakota State Bison.

Born in Decorah, Iowa, Stark grew up in 11 cities, per his cousins including Belmond, Iowa, where he attended high school and played football only during his Freshman year before moving away, later attending Brookings High School, where he became one of the top prep players in South Dakota history while being an All-American and being recruited by over 100 schools. He played college football at North Dakota State University and helped the Bison win the national championship in 1983, 1985 and 1986. He ran for 2,837 yards and 30 touchdowns in his four-year North Dakota State career, being second all-time in school history in rushing yards at the time of his graduation while being a first-team all-conference and second-team All-American as a senior. He also set the NCAA's postseason rushing record at the time.

Selected by the New York Giants in the 12th round of the 1987 NFL draft, Stark was released during preseason and later signed with the practice roster of the Saskatchewan Roughriders. When the NFL Players Association went on strike, he was signed as a replacement player by the Seattle Seahawks and appeared in two games. He later had a stint with the Miami Dolphins.
