= 1986 Texas Southern Tigers football team =

American college football season

1986 Texas Southern Tigers football
- Conference: Southwestern Athletic Conference
- Record: 2–8–1 (1–5–1 SWAC)
- Head coach: Lionel Taylor (3rd season)
- Home stadium: Robertson Stadium; Astrodome; Rice Stadium

1986 Southwestern Athletic Conference football standings
	Conf.					Overall
Team	W		L		T	W		L		T
No. 9 Jackson State $^	7	–	0	–	0	9	–	3	–	0
Alcorn State	5	–	2	–	0	5	–	5	–	0
Grambling State	4	–	3	–	0	7	–	4	–	0
Southern	4	–	3	–	0	5	–	5	–	1
Mississippi Valley State	3	–	3	–	1	4	–	4	–	1
Alabama State	2	–	5	–	0	4	–	7	–	0
Texas Southern	1	–	5	–	1	2	–	8	–	1
Prairie View A&M	1	–	6	–	0	3	–	8	–	0
$ – Conference champion; ^ – NCAA Division I-AA playoff participant; Rankings from NCAA Division I-AA Football Committee poll

The 1986 Texas Southern Tigers football team represented Texas Southern University as a member of the Southwestern Athletic Conference (SWAC) during the 1986 NCAA Division I-AA football season. Led by third-year head coach Lionel Taylor, the Tigers compiled an overall record of 2–8–1, with a mark of 1–6 in conference play, and finished seventh in the SWAC.

== Schedule ==
Date	Opponent	Site	Result	Attendance	Source
September 1	Prairie View A&M	Astrodome; Houston, TX (Labor Day Classic)	W 38–35		
September 6	at Texas A&I*	Javelina Stadium; Kingsville, TX	L 27–48		
September 13	at Angelo State*	San Angelo Stadium; San Angelo, TX	L 27–31		
September 20	Southern	Robertson Stadium; Houston, TX	L 29–43	35,162	
September 27	vs. Alabama State	Ladd Stadium; Mobile, AL (Gulf Coast Classic)	L 31–35		
October 4	Sam Houston State*	Robertson Stadium; Houston, TX	L 28–38		
October 11	at Alcorn State	Henderson Stadium; Lorman, MS	L 33–35		
October 25	Mississippi Valley State	Rice Stadium; Houston, TX	T 34–34		
November 1	Grambling State	Rice Stadium; Houston, TX	L 21–49	12,000	
November 8	at No. T–12 Jackson State	Mississippi Veterans Memorial Stadium; Jackson, MS	L 7–37		
November 15	at Bishop*	Dallas, TX	W 38–20		
*Non-conference game; Rankings from NCAA Division I-AA Football Committee Poll released prior to the game
