= Brian Gant (American football) =

American football player (born 1965)

No. 54
- Position: Linebacker

Personal information
- Born: September 6, 1965 (age 61); Gary, Indiana, U.S.
- Listed height: 6 ft 0 in (1.83 m)
- Listed weight: 235 lb (107 kg)

Career information
- High school: Theodore Roosevelt (Gary)
- College: Illinois State
- NFL draft: 1987: undrafted

Career history
- Tampa Bay Buccaneers (1987)

Career NFL statistics
- Interceptions: 1
- Stats at Pro Football Reference

Brian Keith Gant (born September 6, 1965) is an American former professional football player who was a linebacker for the Tampa Bay Buccaneers of the National Football League (NFL). He played college football for the Illinois State Redbirds. One of the best linebackers in his school's history, he was one of the replacement players during the 1987 NFL strike and was kept for the remainder of the season, being one of very few replacements not to be released after the strike.
