= Steve Holloway =

American football player (born 1964)

No. 80
- Position: Tight end

Personal information
- Born: August 23, 1964 (age 62); Montgomery, Alabama, U.S.
- Listed height: 6 ft 3 in (1.91 m)
- Listed weight: 235 lb (107 kg)

Career information
- High school: Jefferson Davis
- College: Tennessee State
- NFL draft: 1987: undrafted

Career history
- Tampa Bay Buccaneers (1987); Miami Dolphins (1988)*; New York Jets (1989)*
- * Offseason or practice squad member only

Career NFL statistics
- Receptions: 10
- Receiving yards: 127
- Stats at Pro Football Reference

Steven Weymon Holloway (born August 23, 1964) is an American former professional football tight end who played for the Tampa Bay Buccaneers of the National Football League (NFL). He played college football at Tennessee State University.

Holloway attended Jefferson Davis High School in Alabama where he played football and ran track. He played college football for the Tennessee State Tigers from 1983 to 1986. He was signed by the Tampa Bay Buccaneers as an undrafted free agent following the 1987 NFL draft, but was released following preseason, where he caught one pass. He was re-signed by the Buccaneers during the 1987 NFL strike and started all three games at tight end, placing second on the strike team with 10 catches. In the last strike game, he caught eight passes for 107 yards, tying the team's single-game record for catches by a tight end.

Holloway was one of a limited number of players kept after the strike ended, and he appeared in three further games, making one start, before being released. He later had stints with the Miami Dolphins in 1988 and New York Jets in 1989, although he did not make the final roster either year. He ended his career with six games played, four as a starter, and 10 receptions for 127 yards.
