= 1986 NCAA Division I-AA Football Championship Game =

1986 NCAA Division I-AA Football Championship
- I-AA National Championship Game; Diamond Bowl II
Georgia Southern Eagles	Arkansas State Indians
(12–2)	(12–1–1)
Independent	Southland
48	21
Head coach: Erk Russell	Head coach: Larry Lacewell
NCAA / Seed; 4 / 4	NCAA / Seed; 2 / 2
	1	2	3	4	Total
Georgia Southern	10	16	15	7	48
Arkansas State	7	0	8	6	21
- Date: December 19, 1986
- Season: 1986
- Stadium: Tacoma Dome
- Location: Tacoma, Washington
- Referee: Gary Peters
- Attendance: 4,419

United States TV coverage
- Network: ESPN
- Announcers: Tim Brando and Kevin Kiley

The 1986 NCAA Division I-AA Football Championship Game was a postseason college football game between the Arkansas State Indians (now the Arkansas State Red Wolves) and the Georgia Southern Eagles. The game was played on December 19, 1986, at the Tacoma Dome in Tacoma, Washington. The culminating game of the 1986 NCAA Division I-AA football season, it was won by Georgia Southern, 48–21. Georgia Southern, the defending champion from 1985, became the first program to win consecutive Division I-AA titles.

Contemporary news reports also referred to this game as Diamond Bowl II, as the NCAA had introduced Diamond Bowl branding for the Division I-AA championship game in 1985. The on-field logo at midfield included "1986 Diamond Bowl" wording. NCAA records list the game date as Saturday, December 20, 1986; however, contemporary news reports are clear that the game was played on the evening of Friday, December 19, 1986.

== Teams ==
The participants of the Championship Game were the finalists of the 1986 I-AA Playoffs, which began with a 16-team bracket.

=== Georgia Southern Eagles ===
Georgia Southern finished their regular season with a 9–2 record; they played two Division I-A programs, losing to both Florida and East Carolina. Ranked fourth in the final NCAA I-AA in-house poll and seeded fourth in the tournament, the Eagles defeated North Carolina A&T, Nicholls State, and top-seed Nevada to reach the final. This was the second appearance for Georgia Southern in a Division I-AA championship game, having won in 1985.

=== Arkansas State Indians ===
Arkansas State finished their regular season with a 9–1–1 record (5–0 in conference); they played three games against Division I-A programs, resulting in one win (Memphis), one loss (Mississippi State), and a tie (Ole Miss). Ranked second in the final NCAA I-AA in-house poll and seeded second in the tournament, the Indians defeated Sam Houston State, Delaware, and Eastern Kentucky to reach the final. This was the first appearance for Arkansas State in a Division I-AA championship game.

== Game summary ==
=== Scoring summary ===
Scoring summary

Quarter	Time	Drive			Team	Scoring information	Score	
Quarter	Time	Plays	Yards	TOP	Team	Scoring information	GSC	stAte
1	11:03	7	31	3:43	GSC	20-yard field goal by Tim Foley	3	0
1	6:08	9	62	4:04	GSC	Gerald Harris 1-yard touchdown run, Foley kick good	10	0
1	3:08	8	97	3:00	stAte	Boris Whiteside 15-yard touchdown run, Scott Roper kick good	10	7
2	13:21	10	64	4:40	GSC	30-yard field goal by Foley	13	7
2	6:53	9	69	4:28	GSC	25-yard field goal by Foley	16	7
2	1:33	9	95	3:37	GSC	Tracy Ham 25-yard touchdown run, Foley kick good	23	7
2	0:06	5	32	0:39	GSC	36-yard field goal by Foley	26	7
3	12:11	6	77	2:49	GSC	Ham 31-yard touchdown run, 2-point pass good (Herman Barron from Ham)	34	7
3	8:55				stAte	Safety: GSC snapped ball out of end zone on a punt attempt	34	9
3	8:17	2	50	0:14	GSC	Ham 11-yard touchdown run, Foley kick good	41	9
3	5:36	6	76	2:41	stAte	Whiteside 15-yard touchdown run, 2-point pass failed	41	15
4	10:52	2	73	0:49	GSC	Ricky Harris 79-yard touchdown reception from Ham, Foley kick good	48	15
4	5:15	3	67	0:43	stAte	Cazzy Francis 44-yard touchdown run, 2-point pass failed	48	21
"TOP" = time of possession. For other American football terms, see Glossary of American football.							48	21

=== Game statistics ===
	1	2	3	4	Total
Eagles	10	16	15	7	48
Indians	7	0	8	6	21

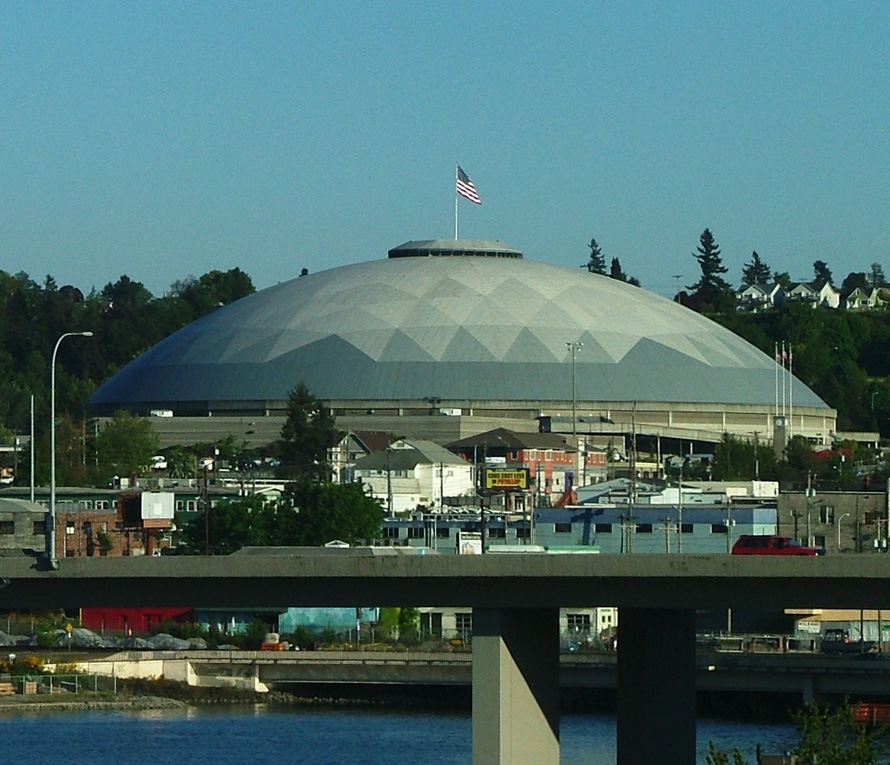
Tacoma Dome, site of the 1986 Division I-AA championship game

Statistics	GSC	stAte
First downs	28	21
Plays–yards	70–603	69–424
Rushes–yards	58–297	51–343
Passing yards	306	81
Passing: comp–att–int	12–22–0	8–18–1
Time of possession	35:43	24:17

Team	Category	Player	Statistics
Georgia Southern	Passing	Tracy Ham	12–21, 306 yds, 1 TD
Georgia Southern	Rushing	Tracy Ham	24 car, 180 yds, 3 TD
Georgia Southern	Receiving	Ricky Harris	3 rec, 143 yds, 1 TD
Arkansas State	Passing	Dwane Brown	8–71, 81 yds, 1 INT
Arkansas State	Rushing	Richard Kimble	13 car, 134 yds
Arkansas State	Receiving	Andre Tate	2 rec, 29 yds
