= Robert DiRico =

American football player (born 1963)

No. 36
- Position: Running back

Personal information
- Born: November 22, 1963 (age 62); Norristown, Pennsylvania, U.S.
- Listed height: 5 ft 10 in (1.78 m)
- Listed weight: 202 lb (92 kg)

Career information
- High school: Upper Merion
- College: West Chester; Kutztown
- NFL draft: 1987: undrafted

Career history
- New York Giants (1987)

Career NFL statistics
- Rushing yards: 90
- Rushing average: 3.6
- Receptions: 2
- Receiving yards: 22
- Stats at Pro Football Reference

Robert J. DiRico (born November 22, 1963) is an American former professional football player who was a running back for one season with the New York Giants of the National Football League (NFL). He played college football for the West Chester Golden Rams and Kutztown Golden Bears. He had 25 rushes for 95 yards in his NFL career. He also had 2 catches for 22 yards. He was a replacement player.
