= 1986 Florida A&M Rattlers football team =

American college football season

1986 Florida A&M Rattlers football
- Conference: Independent
- Record: 5–6
- Head coach: Ken Riley (1st season)
- Defensive coordinator: Wally Highsmith (1st season)
- Home stadium: Bragg Memorial Stadium

1986 NCAA Division I-AA independents football standings
	Conf.			Overall
Team	W	L	T	W		L		T
No. 4 Georgia Southern ^		–		13	–	2	–	0
No. 14 Tennessee State ^		–		10	–	2	–	1
No. 8 William & Mary ^		–		9	–	3	–	0
Eastern Washington		–		5	–	5	–	0
James Madison		–		5	–	5	–	1
Florida A&M		–		5	–	6	–	0
Northeastern		–		4	–	6	–	0
Western Kentucky		–		4	–	6	–	1
^ – NCAA Division I-AA playoff participant; Rankings from NCAA Division I-AA Football Committee poll

The 1986 Florida A&M Rattlers football team represented Florida A&M University as an independent during the 1986 NCAA Division I-AA football season. Led by first-year head coach Ken Riley, the Rattlers compiled a record of 5–6.

== Schedule ==
Date	Opponent	Site	Result	Attendance	Source
September 6	Tuskegee	Bragg Memorial Stadium; Tallahassee, FL	W 17–9	10,473	
September 13	vs. No. 1 Georgia Southern	Gator Bowl; Jacksonville, FL (Bold City Classic)	L 12–35	21,982	
September 20	at Temple	Veterans Stadium; Philadelphia, PA	L 17–38	42,098	
September 27	at No. 7 Tennessee State	Vanderbilt Stadium; Nashville, TN	L 12–34	30,050	
October 4	Albany State	Bragg Memorial Stadium; Tallahassee, FL	L 2–13	10,926	
October 11	vs. No. 5 (D-II) Central State (OH)	Hoosier Dome; Indianapolis, IN (Circle City Classic)	L 3–41	41,002	
October 18	vs. Alcorn State	Miami Orange Bowl; Miami, FL (Orange Blossom Classic)	W 33–30	17,327	
November 1	Hampton	Bragg Memorial Stadium; Tallahassee, FL	W 44–9	21,978	
November 8	South Carolina State	Bragg Memorial Stadium; Tallahassee, FL	W 26–3	7,295	
November 15	at Southern	A. W. Mumford Stadium; Baton Rouge, LA	L 14–30		
November 29	vs. Bethune–Cookman	Tampa Stadium; Tampa, FL (Florida Classic)	W 16–6	36,610	
Rankings from NCAA Division I-AA Football Committee Poll released prior to the game
