= Mike Kullman =

American football player (1962–2003)

- Kullman with the Eagles in 1987

No. 35
- Position: Defensive back

Personal information
- Born: January 22, 1962; Frankfurt, West Germany
- Died: July 21, 2003 (aged 41); Allentown, Pennsylvania, U.S.
- Listed height: 6 ft 1 in (1.85 m)
- Listed weight: 185 lb (84 kg)

Career information
- High school: Archbishop Ryan (PA)
- College: Kutztown (1983–1986)
- NFL draft: 1987: undrafted

Career history

Playing
- Bucks County Redskins (1981); Ches-Mont Bandits (1982); Philadelphia Eagles (1987)

Coaching
- Kutztown (1993–1996) Assistant coach

Awards and highlights
- First-team All-PSAC (1985); Second-team All-PSAC (1986); Kutztown Athletics Hall of Fame (2007)

Career NFL statistics
- Interceptions: 2
- Interception yards: 25
- Stats at Pro Football Reference

Michael G. Kullman (January 22, 1962 – July 21, 2003) was a German-born professional football player who was a defensive back for one season in the National Football League (NFL) for the Philadelphia Eagles. He played college football at Kutztown, and also spent time semi-professionally with the Bucks County Redskins and Ches-Mont Bandits.

== Early life ==
Kullman was born on January 22, 1962, in Frankfurt, West Germany. His family moved to United States when he was young, and he attended Archbishop Ryan High School in Philadelphia, Pennsylvania. Weighing 89 pounds (40 kg) as a freshman in 1975, he tried out for the school freshman football team, but was cut two weeks into training camp. He tried out for the varsity roster two seasons later as a wide receiver, but was one of the first cuts. After being cut, he played the season on the 120-pound football team in the Liberty Bell Youth Organization. After adding 25 pounds before the start of the next season, Kullman was persuaded by coach Angelo Coia, a former National Football League (NFL) player, to tryout for the Ryan varsity team again. Shortly before the first preseason cuts, having "not made any progress", and with a third cut being "too humiliating", Kullman quit the team.

== Semi-professional career ==
After graduating from high school, Kullman spent the 1978 and 1979 seasons with the "Far Northeast 140-pound" football team. He did not play in 1980, but returned to the sport in 1981 as a member of the semi-professional Bucks County Redskins. He later stated that his semi-professional stint was "different than any of his prior football experiences," saying, "I'm 18 years old, and all the rest of the guys on the team were, like, 24 or 25. It was different. After practice, all the guys would go to bars. And I couldn't." Kullman spent the 1982 season as a member of the Ches-Mont Bandits.

== College career ==
After spending 1982 with the Bandits, Kullman enrolled at the Kutztown University of Pennsylvania in 1983. Though he did not see much action as a freshman that year, he became a starter at free safety over the next three years. Following his junior year of 1985, he was named first-team All-Pennsylvania State Athletic Conference. He was a second-team selection the following year, having his best game statistically against Bloomsburg University in a 7–7 tie. That game, he made 20 tackles, a quarterback sack, one interception and one fumble recovery. He finished his college career with 228 tackles made, 10 interceptions, and 22 pass breakups. (Note: Kutztown University records the aforementioned statistics, while a 1987 report in The Philadelphia Inquirer stated he made 222 tackles and only nine interceptions; they also mentioned seven career fumble recoveries.) He graduated with a degree in criminal justice.

== Professional career ==
Kullman was not selected in the 1987 NFL draft. In the offseason, his secondary coach at Kutztown, Tony Leonzi, called the Philadelphia Eagles defensive backs coach Jeff Fisher and convinced him to give Kullman a tryout. "The coach at Kutztown contacted me during the off-season, in April, just after our first minicamp," Fisher said. "He said he had a real good athlete – a local guy – who was a pretty good player. I said we would give him a free-agent shot. Obviously, you get a lot of calls like that." However, Kullman impressed at his tryout, and was signed by the Eagles as an undrafted free agent in May.

An article in The Philadelphia Inquirer described him as, "the longest long shot on the team," but that "he has a shot, he says. And one shot is better than none at all." It also wrote, "Kullman is Walter Mitty dressed in a green, No. 35 jersey. He is 25 years old – the oldest rookie on the Eagles roster. He negotiated his own contract, which, he says falls far short of making him a millionaire."

In the preseason, Kullman appeared in one quarter versus the New York Jets, but did not appear in their game against the Detroit Lions and was subsequently released. One week later, he was given a $1,000 retainer in case of a strike. When the Players Association went on a strike later in the year, Kullman returned to the Eagles.

Kullman appeared in three total games for the Eagles, and was their starter in one of them. In his NFL debut, a 3–35 loss against the Chicago Bears, he intercepted a pass and returned it 13 yards. He made his first start against the Dallas Cowboys in the following game. He played his final career game in the following week, intercepting a pass in a 10–16 overtime loss at the Green Bay Packers. The strike ended after the game and Kullman was released by the team. In three appearances, he made two interceptions, returning them for 25 total yards, and nine tackles.

After being released, Kullman announced plans to pursue a career in law enforcement, similar to his father, who served as a police officer.

== Later life and death ==
Kullman later owned the Crocodile Rock Cafe in Lehigh Valley, Pennsylvania. From 1993 to 1996, he served as an assistant coach at his alma mater, Kutztown University.

Kullman was diagnosed with amyotrophic lateral sclerosis (ALS) in December 2000, and died of the disease on July 21, 2003, at the age of 41. He was posthumously inducted into the Kutztown Athletics Hall of Fame in 2007.
