= Dennis Borcky =

American football player (born 1964)

No. 77
- Position: Nose tackle

Personal information
- Born: September 14, 1964 (age 62); Chester, Pennsylvania, U.S.
- Listed height: 6 ft 5 in (1.96 m)
- Listed weight: 285 lb (129 kg)

Career information
- High school: Chichester (PA)
- College: Memphis
- NFL draft: 1987: undrafted

Career history
- Pittsburgh Steelers (1987)*; New York Giants (1987)
- * Offseason or practice squad member only

Career NFL statistics
- Fumble recoveries: 1
- Stats at Pro Football Reference

Dennis Michael Borcky (born September 14, 1964) is an American former professional football player who was a nose tackle for one season with the New York Giants of the National Football League (NFL) in 1987. He played college football for the Memphis Tigers.

== Career ==
=== High School ===
Borcky played high school football at Chichester High School under Chip Carroll as an offensive and defensive tackle and sometimes as a guard and defensive end. He was also involved in athletics in 1981 and 1982 as a discus and javelin thrower. In 1980 he made The Daily Times' Athletic Honor Role after a game against the Sun Valley Vanguards. In 1981, he won with Chichester the Del Val A League and was named Daily Times Player of the Year and first team All-Delco (1980 and 1981). He was also named AP first-team all-state on offense. In the summer of 1982 he played in the Coaches Grid Classic.

=== College ===
Borcky played college football at Memphis University for the Tigers from 1983 to 1987. He redshirted his first year in 1982.

=== NFL ===
Borcky signed in May 1987 as an undrafted free agent with the Pittsburgh Steelers as a nose tackle. He got waived in August 1987 alongside Warren Seitz, Mike Crow, Corey Gilmore, and Mike Clark. He played two games for the New York Giants on the replacement roster during the NFLPA-strike in the 1987 season. In August 1988, he got waived by the Giants together with J. R. Compton.

== Family ==
Borcky's brothers Kevin, Paul and Tim Brocky also played football and Tim got drafted in 1988 in the seventh round by the Buffalo Bills. His father Rich and uncles Bud and Al played football and his father played some semipro football for one season. Also his cousins Al Jr., Steve, Ron, Buddy, Bob and Ricci played football. Borcky's brother Rich Jr. was the only basketball player in the family.
