= Brian Sisley =

American football player (1964–2013)

No. 93
- Position: Defensive end

Personal information
- Born: January 18, 1964; Hot Springs, Arkansas, U.S.
- Died: January 31, 2013 (aged 49); St. Michael, Minnesota, U.S.
- Listed height: 6 ft 4 in (1.93 m)
- Listed weight: 235 lb (107 kg)

Career information
- High school: Edgemont
- College: South Dakota State
- NFL draft: 1987: undrafted

Career history
- New York Giants (1987)
- Stats at Pro Football Reference

Brian D. Sisley (January 18, 1964 – January 31, 2013) was an American professional football defensive end. He played for the New York Giants in 1987 and appeared in three games. One of the National Football League (NFL)'s replacement players during the players strike, he had previously played college football for the South Dakota State Jackrabbits. He died in 2013, at the age of 49.
