= David Etherly =

American football player (born 1962)

Dave Etherly
No. 25
- Position: Cornerback

Personal information
- Born: December 22, 1962 (age 63); Albuquerque, New Mexico, U.S.
- Listed height: 6 ft 1 in (1.85 m)
- Listed weight: 190 lb (86 kg)

Career information
- High school: Lakeridge (OR)
- College: Oregon State; Portland State
- NFL draft: 1987: undrafted

Career history
- Winnipeg Blue Bombers (1987); Washington Redskins (1987)

Career NFL statistics
- Games played: 3
- Stats at Pro Football Reference

David L. Etherly (born December 22, 1962) is an American former professional football player who was a cornerback for the Washington Redskins of the National Football League (NFL). He played college football for the Oregon State Beavers and Portland State Vikings.

== Professional career ==
Etherly played for the Washington Redskins in 1987 season. The 1987 season began with a 24-day players' strike, reducing the 16-game season to 15. The games for weeks 4–6 were won with all replacement players, including Etherly. The Redskins have the distinction of being the only team with no players crossing the picket line. Those three victories are often credited with getting the team into the playoffs and the basis for the 2000 movie The Replacements.
