= Kevin Thomas (center) =

American football player (born 1965)

No. 64
- Position: Center

Personal information
- Born: July 27, 1964 (age 62); Tucson, Arizona, U.S.
- Listed height: 6 ft 2 in (1.88 m)
- Listed weight: 268 lb (122 kg)

Career information
- High school: Canyon del Oro (Oro Valley, Arizona)
- College: Arizona State
- NFL draft: 1987: undrafted

Career history
- Tampa Bay Buccaneers (1987–1988); Seattle Seahawks (1989)*; Phoenix Cardinals (1989)*; Arizona Rattlers (1992–1995)
- * Offseason or practice squad member only

Awards and highlights
- ArenaBowl champion (1994)

Career NFL statistics
- Games played: 10
- Stats at Pro Football Reference

Kevin Alan Thomas (born July 27, 1964) is an American former professional football player who was a center for the Tampa Bay Buccaneers of the National Football League (NFL). He also played for Arizona Rattlers in the Arena Football League (AFL) and was a member of the Seattle Seahawks. He played college football for the Arizona State Sun Devils.
