= 1986 Tennessee State Tigers football team =

American college football season

1986 Tennessee State Tigers football

NCAA Division I-AA Quarterfinal, L 6–33 vs. Nevada
- Conference: Independent
- Record: 10–2–1
- Head coach: William A. Thomas (3rd season)
- Home stadium: Hale Stadium; Vanderbilt Stadium

1986 NCAA Division I-AA independents football standings
	Conf.			Overall
Team	W	L	T	W		L		T
No. 4 Georgia Southern ^		–		13	–	2	–	0
No. 14 Tennessee State ^		–		10	–	2	–	1
No. 8 William & Mary ^		–		9	–	3	–	0
Eastern Washington		–		5	–	5	–	0
James Madison		–		5	–	5	–	1
Florida A&M		–		5	–	6	–	0
Northeastern		–		4	–	6	–	0
Western Kentucky		–		4	–	6	–	1
^ – NCAA Division I-AA playoff participant; Rankings from NCAA Division I-AA Football Committee poll

The 1986 Tennessee State Tigers football team represented Tennessee State University as an independent during the 1986 NCAA Division I-AA football season. Led by third-year head coach William A. Thomas, the Tigers compiled an overall record of 10–2–1. Tennessee State advanced to the Division I-AA post season and defeated Jackson State in the first round and lost to Nevada in the quarterfinals.

== Schedule ==
Date	Opponent	Rank	Site	Result	Attendance	Source
August 30	at Morris Brown		Herndon Stadium; Atlanta, GA	W 27–0		
September 6	No. 4 Middle Tennessee		Vanderbilt Stadium; Nashville, TN	W 7–6	28,000	
September 13	No. 14 Jackson State		Hale Stadium; Nashville, TN	W 20–10		
September 27	Florida A&M	No. 7	Vanderbilt Stadium; Nashville, TN	W 34–12	30,050	
October 4	East Texas State	No. 9	Hale Stadium; Nashville, TN	W 15–6	5,500	
October 11	at No. 20 Grambling State	No. 7	Eddie G. Robinson Memorial Stadium; Grambling, LA	W 21–10		
October 18	Western Kentucky	No. 8	Vanderbilt Stadium; Nashville, TN	W 25–3	26,684	
October 25	at Morgan State	No. 7	Hughes Stadium; Baltimore, MD	W 52–10	2,800	
November 1	vs. Southern	No. 5	Liberty Bowl Memorial Stadium; Memphis, TN	T 17–17	24,902	
November 8	vs. Bethune–Cookman	No. 9	Miami Orange Bowl; Miami, FL	W 13–10	12,500	
November 22	Alabama A&M	No. 8	Hale Stadium; Nashville, TN	L 6–7	7,000	
November 29	at No. 9 Jackson State	No. 14	Mississippi Veterans Memorial Stadium; Jackson, MS (NCAA Division I-AA First Round)	W 32–23	24,000	
December 6	at No. 1 Nevada	No. 14	Mackay Stadium; Reno, NV (NCAA Division I-AA Quarterfinal)	L 6–33	13,102	
Rankings from NCAA Division I-AA Football Committee Poll released prior to the game
