= 1986 Southern Jaguars football team =

American college football season

1986 Southern Jaguars football
- Conference: Southwestern Athletic Conference
- Record: 5–5–1 (4–3 SWAC)
- Head coach: Otis Washington (6th season)
- Home stadium: A. W. Mumford Stadium

1986 Southwestern Athletic Conference football standings
	Conf.					Overall
Team	W		L		T	W		L		T
No. 9 Jackson State $^	7	–	0	–	0	9	–	3	–	0
Alcorn State	5	–	2	–	0	5	–	5	–	0
Grambling State	4	–	3	–	0	7	–	4	–	0
Southern	4	–	3	–	0	5	–	5	–	1
Mississippi Valley State	3	–	3	–	1	4	–	4	–	1
Alabama State	2	–	5	–	0	4	–	7	–	0
Texas Southern	1	–	5	–	1	2	–	8	–	1
Prairie View A&M	1	–	6	–	0	3	–	8	–	0
$ – Conference champion; ^ – NCAA Division I-AA playoff participant; Rankings from NCAA Division I-AA Football Committee poll

The 1986 Southern Jaguars football team represented Southern University as a member of the Southwestern Athletic Conference (SWAC) during the 1986 NCAA Division I-AA football season. Led by sixth-year head coach Otis Washington, the Jaguars compiled an overall record of 5–5–1, with a conference record of 4–3, and finished tied for third in the SWAC.

== Schedule ==
Date	Opponent	Rank	Site	Result	Attendance	Source
August 30	vs. Delaware State*		Independence Stadium; Shreveport, LA	L 14–21	10,000	
September 13	Alabama State		A. W. Mumford Stadium; Baton Rouge, LA	W 27–9	15,000	
September 20	at Texas Southern		Robertson Stadium; Houston, TX	W 43–29	35,162	
September 27	Prairie View A&M		A. W. Mumford Stadium; Baton Rouge, LA	W 21–14		
October 4	Mississippi Valley State		A. W. Mumford Stadium; Baton Rouge, LA	W 28–7		
October 11	at No. T–9 Nicholls State*	No. T–16	John L. Guidry Stadium; Thibodaux, LA	L 10–17		
October 18	Jackson State		A. W. Mumford Stadium; Baton Rouge, LA (rivalry)	L 9–16	21,555	
October 25	at Alcorn State		Henderson Stadium; Lorman, MS	L 13–14	10,699	
November 1	vs. Tennessee State*		Liberty Bowl Memorial Stadium; Memphis, TN	T 17–17	24,902	
November 15	Florida A&M*		A. W. Mumford Stadium; Baton Rouge, LA	W 30–14		
November 29	vs. Grambling State		Louisiana Superdome; New Orleans, LA (Bayou Classic)	L 3–30	58,960	
*Non-conference game; Rankings from NCAA Division I-AA Football Committee Poll released prior to the game
