= 1986 William & Mary Tribe football team =

American college football season

1986 William & Mary Tribe football

NCAA Division I-AA First Round, L 17–51 vs. Delaware
- Conference: Independent
- Record: 9–3
- Head coach: Jimmye Laycock (7th season)
- Captains: Dave Pocta; Dave Szydlik; Pinball Clemons
- Home stadium: Cary Field

1986 NCAA Division I-AA independents football standings
	Conf.			Overall
Team	W	L	T	W		L		T
No. 4 Georgia Southern ^		–		13	–	2	–	0
No. 14 Tennessee State ^		–		10	–	2	–	1
No. 8 William & Mary ^		–		9	–	3	–	0
Eastern Washington		–		5	–	5	–	0
James Madison		–		5	–	5	–	1
Florida A&M		–		5	–	6	–	0
Northeastern		–		4	–	6	–	0
Western Kentucky		–		4	–	6	–	1
^ – NCAA Division I-AA playoff participant; Rankings from NCAA Division I-AA Football Committee poll

The 1986 William & Mary Tribe football team represented the College of William & Mary as an independent during the 1986 NCAA Division I-AA football season. Led by Jimmye Laycock in his seventh year as head coach, William & Mary finished the season with a record of 9–3 and ranked No. 8 in the final NCAA Division I-AA Football Committee poll. The Tribe qualified for the NCAA Division I-AA playoffs, losing to Delaware in the first round.

== Schedule ==
Date	Opponent	Rank	Site	Result	Attendance	Source
September 6	No. 16 Colgate	No. 19	Cary Field; Williamsburg, VA	W 42–21	8,620	
September 13	VMI	No. 19	Cary Field; Williamsburg, VA (rivalry)	W 37–22	10,100	
September 20	at Bucknell	No. 9	Memorial Stadium; Lewisburg, PA	W 30–13	4,760	
October 4	Harvard	No. T–5	Cary Field; Williamsburg, VA	W 24–0	13,100	
October 11	at Lehigh	No. 5	Taylor Stadium; Bethlehem, PA	W 44–34	6,000	
October 18	at No. T–14 Delaware	No. 4	Delaware Stadium; Newark, DE (rivalry)	W 24–18	23,045	
October 25	at James Madison	No. 3	JMU Stadium; Harrisonburg, VA (rivalry)	L 33–42	7,500	
November 1	at Virginia	No. 10	Scott Stadium; Charlottesville, VA	W 41–37	35,100	
November 8	Princeton	No. 8	Cary Field; Williamsburg, VA	W 32–14	11,300	
November 15	No. T–2 Holy Cross	No. 8	Cary Field; Williamsburg, VA	L 7–31	17,450	
November 22	at Richmond	No. 9	University of Richmond Stadium; Richmond, VA (I-64 Bowl)	W 21–14	19,743	
November 29	No. 13 Delaware	No. 8	Cary Field; Williamsburg, VA (NCAA Division I-AA First Round)	L 17–51	5,700	
Rankings from NCAA Division I-AA Football Committee Poll released prior to the game
