= 1986 Grambling State Tigers football team =

American college football season

1986 Grambling State Tigers football
- Conference: Southwestern Athletic Conference
- Record: 7–4 (4–3 SWAC)
- Head coach: Eddie Robinson (44th season)
- Home stadium: Eddie G. Robinson Memorial Stadium

1986 Southwestern Athletic Conference football standings
	Conf.					Overall
Team	W		L		T	W		L		T
No. 9 Jackson State $^	7	–	0	–	0	9	–	3	–	0
Alcorn State	5	–	2	–	0	5	–	5	–	0
Grambling State	4	–	3	–	0	7	–	4	–	0
Southern	4	–	3	–	0	5	–	5	–	1
Mississippi Valley State	3	–	3	–	1	4	–	4	–	1
Alabama State	2	–	5	–	0	4	–	7	–	0
Texas Southern	1	–	5	–	1	2	–	8	–	1
Prairie View A&M	1	–	6	–	0	3	–	8	–	0
$ – Conference champion; ^ – NCAA Division I-AA playoff participant; Rankings from NCAA Division I-AA Football Committee poll

The 1986 Grambling State Tigers football team represented Grambling State University as a member of the Southwestern Athletic Conference (SWAC) during the 1986 NCAA Division I-AA football season. Led by 44th-year head coach Eddie Robinson, the Tigers compiled an overall record of 7–4 and a mark of 4–3 in conference play, and finished tied for third in the SWAC.

== Schedule ==
Date	Opponent	Rank	Site	Result	Attendance	Source
September 13	vs. Alcorn State		Independence Stadium; Shreveport, LA (Red River Classic)	W 19–17	21,016	
September 20	vs. North Carolina Central*	No. 14	Yankee Stadium; Bronx, NY (Whitney Young Memorial Classic)	W 32–24	31,968	
September 27	vs. Bethune–Cookman*	No. 16	Gator Bowl Stadium; Jacksonville, FL	W 30–24	22,000	
October 4	vs. Prairie View A&M	No. 13	Cotton Bowl; Dallas, TX (rivalry)	L 19–24	33,480	
October 11	No. 7 Tennessee State*	No. 20	Eddie G. Robinson Memorial Stadium; Grambling, LA	L 10–21		
October 18	vs. Mississippi Valley State		Ladd Memorial Stadium; Mobile, AL	L 10–13	16,454	
October 25	Jackson State		Eddie G. Robinson Memorial Stadium; Grambling, LA	L 14–25	22,000	
November 1	at Texas Southern		Rice Stadium; Houston, TX	W 49–21	12,000	
November 8	Alabama State		Eddie G. Robinson Memorial Stadium; Grambling, LA	W 16–7	4,798	
November 15	at South Carolina State*		Oliver C. Dawson Stadium; Orangeburg, SC	W 20–16	7,413	
November 29	vs. Southern		Louisiana Superdome; New Orleans, LA (Bayou Classic)	W 30–3	58,960	
*Non-conference game; Rankings from NCAA Division I-AA Football Committee Poll released prior to the game
