= 1986 Jackson State Tigers football team =

American college football season

1986 Jackson State Tigers football

SWAC champion

NCAA Division I-AA First Round, L 23–32 at Tennessee State
- Conference: Southwestern Athletic Conference
- Record: 9–3 (7–0 SWAC)
- Head coach: W. C. Gorden (11th season)
- Home stadium: Mississippi Veterans Memorial Stadium

1986 Southwestern Athletic Conference football standings
| | Conf. | | | | | Overall |
| Team | W | | L | | T | W | | L | | T |
|---|---|---|---|---|---|---|---|---|---|---|
| No. 9 Jackson State $^ | 7 | – | 0 | – | 0 | 9 | – | 3 | – | 0 |
| Alcorn State | 5 | – | 2 | – | 0 | 5 | – | 5 | – | 0 |
| Grambling State | 4 | – | 3 | – | 0 | 7 | – | 4 | – | 0 |
| Southern | 4 | – | 3 | – | 0 | 5 | – | 5 | – | 1 |
| Mississippi Valley State | 3 | – | 3 | – | 1 | 4 | – | 4 | – | 1 |
| Alabama State | 2 | – | 5 | – | 0 | 4 | – | 7 | – | 0 |
| Texas Southern | 1 | – | 5 | – | 1 | 2 | – | 8 | – | 1 |
| Prairie View A&M | 1 | – | 6 | – | 0 | 3 | – | 8 | – | 0 |
$ – Conference champion; ^ – NCAA Division I-AA playoff participant; Rankings from NCAA Division I-AA Football Committee poll

The 1986 Jackson State Tigers football team represented Jackson State University as a member of the Southwestern Athletic Conference (SWAC) during the 1986 NCAA Division I-AA football season. Led by 11th-year head coach W. C. Gorden, the Tigers compiled an overall record of 9–3, with a conference record of 7–0, and finished as SWAC champion. Jackson State advanced to the NCAA Division I-AA Football Championship playoffs, but lost to Tennessee State in the first round.

== Schedule ==
| Date | Opponent | Rank | Site | Result | Attendance | Source |
|---|---|---|---|---|---|---|
| August 30 | North Carolina Central* | | Mississippi Veterans Memorial Stadium; Jackson, MS | W 49–37 | | |
| September 6 | at Alabama State | | Cramton Bowl; Montgomery, AL | W 26–20 | | |
| September 13 | at Tennessee State* | | Hale Stadium; Nashville, TN (rivalry) | L 10–20 | | |
| September 20 | Prairie View A&M | | Mississippi Veterans Memorial Stadium; Jackson, MS | W 32–24 | | |
| September 27 | Mississippi Valley State | No. 18 | Mississippi Veterans Memorial Stadium; Jackson, MS | W 26–8 | | |
| October 4 | vs. No. 7 Delaware State* | No. T–14 | Franklin Field; Philadelphia, PA | W 28–25 | | |
| October 11 | Southwest Missouri State* | | Mississippi Veterans Memorial Stadium; Jackson, MS | L 6–10 | | |
| October 18 | at Southern | | A. W. Mumford Stadium; Baton Rouge, LA (rivalry) | W 16–9 | 21,555 | |
| October 25 | at Grambling State | | Eddie G. Robinson Memorial Stadium; Grambling, LA | W 25–14 | 22,000 | |
| November 8 | Texas Southern | No. T–12 | Mississippi Veterans Memorial Stadium; Jackson, MS | W 37–7 | | |
| November 22 | Alcorn State | No. 10 | Mississippi Veterans Memorial Stadium; Jackson, MS (rivalry) | W 23–17 | 20,000 | |
| November 29 | No. 14 Tennessee State* | No. 9 | Mississippi Veterans Memorial Stadium; Jackson, MS (NCAA Division I-AA First Round) | L 23–32 | 24,000 | |
*Non-conference game; Rankings from NCAA Division I-AA Football Committee Poll released prior to the game
