= 1986 Georgia Southern Eagles football team =

American college football season

1986 Georgia Southern Eagles football

NCAA Division I-AA champion

NCAA Division I-AA Championship, W 48–21 vs. Arkansas State
- Conference: Independent

Ranking
- AP: No. 4
- Record: 13–2
- Head coach: Erk Russell (5th season)
- Offensive coordinator: Paul Johnson (2nd season)
- Offensive scheme: Option
- Defensive coordinator: Len Gravelson (2nd season)
- Base defense: 4–4
- Home stadium: Paulson Stadium

1986 NCAA Division I-AA independents football standings
	Conf.			Overall
Team	W	L	T	W		L		T
No. 4 Georgia Southern ^		–		13	–	2	–	0
No. 14 Tennessee State ^		–		10	–	2	–	1
No. 8 William & Mary ^		–		9	–	3	–	0
Eastern Washington		–		5	–	5	–	0
James Madison		–		5	–	5	–	1
Florida A&M		–		5	–	6	–	0
Northeastern		–		4	–	6	–	0
Western Kentucky		–		4	–	6	–	1
^ – NCAA Division I-AA playoff participant; Rankings from NCAA Division I-AA Football Committee poll

The 1986 Georgia Southern Eagles football team represented the Georgia Southern Eagles of Georgia Southern College (now known as Georgia Southern University) during the 1986 NCAA Division I-AA football season. The Eagles played their home games at Paulson Stadium in Statesboro, Georgia. The team was coached by Erk Russell, in his fifth year as head coach for the Eagles.

== Schedule ==
Date	Opponent	Rank	Site	Result	Attendance	Source
August 30	at No. 13 (I-A) Florida	No. 1	Florida Field; Gainesville FL	L 14–38	74,221	
September 13	vs. Florida A&M	No. 1	Gator Bowl; Jacksonville, FL (Bold City Classic)	W 35–12	21,982	
September 20	at No. 17 Middle Tennessee	No. 4	Johnny "Red" Floyd Stadium; Murfreesboro, TN	W 34–31	11,000	
September 27	Chattanooga	No. 4	Paulson Stadium; Statesboro, GA	W 34–14	15,235	
October 4	at Tennessee Tech	No. 4	Tucker Stadium; Cookeville, TN	W 59–13	6,211	
October 11	Bethune–Cookman	No. 3	Paulson Stadium; Statesboro, GA	W 52–31	14,321	
October 18	at East Carolina	No. 2	Ficklen Memorial Stadium; Greenville, NC	L 33–35	27,121	
November 1	at Western Kentucky	No. 9	L. T. Smith Stadium; Bowling Green, KY	W 49–32	13,000	
November 8	at UCF	No. 5	Florida Citrus Bowl; Orlando, FL	W 33–23	11,137	
November 15	James Madison	No. 5	Paulson Stadium; Statesboro, GA	W 45–35	16,135	
November 22	South Carolina State	No. 5	Paulson Stadium; Statesboro, GA	W 28–7	12,585	
November 29	No. 20 North Carolina A&T	No. 4	Paulson Stadium; Statesboro, GA (NCAA Division I-AA First Round)	W 52–21	7,767	
December 6	No. 12 Nicholls State	No. 4	Paulson Stadium; Statesboro, GA (NCAA Division I-AA Quarterfinal)	W 55–31	9,121	
December 13	at No. 1 Nevada	No. 4	Mackay Stadium; Reno, NV (NCAA Division I-AA Semifinal)	W 48–38	15,000	
December 19	vs. No. 2 Arkansas State	No. 4	Tacoma Dome; Tacoma, WA (NCAA Division I-AA Championship Game)	W 48–21	4,419	
Rankings from NCAA Division I-AA Football Committee Poll released prior to the game
