= 1986 NCAA Division I-AA football season =

American college football season

1986 NCAA Division I-AA season

Regular season
- Number of teams: 86
- Duration: August–November

Playoff
- Duration: November 29–December 19
- Championship date: December 19, 1986
- Championship site: Tacoma Dome; Tacoma, Washington
- Champion: Georgia Southern

NCAA Division I-AA football seasons
- «1985 1987»

The 1986 NCAA Division I-AA football season, part of college football in the United States organized by the National Collegiate Athletic Association at the Division I-AA level, began in August 1986, and concluded with the 1986 NCAA Division I-AA Football Championship Game on December 19, 1986, at the Tacoma Dome in Tacoma, Washington. The Georgia Southern Eagles won their second consecutive I-AA championship, defeating the Arkansas State Indians by a score of 48–21.

== Conference changes and new programs ==
- Prior to the season, the Colonial League was established as a five-member, football-only league for teams in Massachusetts, New York, and Pennsylvania. The Colonial League was a forerunner of today's Patriot League and has no connection to the later Colonial Athletic Association (today's Coastal Athletic Association).

School	1985 Conference	1986 Conference
Bucknell	I-AA Independent	Colonial
Colgate	I-AA Independent	Colonial
Delaware	I-AA Independent	Yankee
Drake	Missouri Valley (I-AA)	D-III Independent
Holy Cross	I-AA Independent	Colonial
Indiana State	Missouri Valley	Gateway
Lafayette	I-AA Independent	Colonial
Lehigh	I-AA Independent	Colonial
Richmond	I-AA Independent	Yankee
Southeastern Louisiana	Gulf Star	Dropped Program
Texas–Arlington	Southland	Dropped Program
West Texas State	Missouri Valley (I-AA)	Lone Star (II)

== Conference standings ==
1986 Big Sky Conference football standings
	Conf.					Overall
Team	W		L		T	W		L		T
No. 1 Nevada $^	7	–	0	–	0	13	–	1	–	0
No. 16 Idaho ^	8	–	2	–	0	8	–	4	–	0
Northern Arizona	5	–	2	–	0	7	–	4	–	0
Montana *	4	–	4	–	0	6	–	4	–	0
Boise State	3	–	4	–	0	5	–	6	–	0
Weber State	2	–	5	–	0	3	–	8	–	0
Montana State	2	–	5	–	0	3	–	8	–	0
Idaho State *	1	–	7	–	0	2	–	9	–	0
$ – Conference champion; ^ – NCAA Division I-AA playoff participant; * – Montana and Idaho State played twice.; Rankings from NCAA Division I-AA Poll

1986 Colonial League football standings
	Conf.					Overall
Team	W		L		T	W		L		T
No. 5 Holy Cross $	4	–	0	–	0	10	–	1	–	0
Lafayette	2	–	2	–	0	6	–	5	–	0
Lehigh	2	–	2	–	0	5	–	6	–	0
Colgate	1	–	3	–	0	4	–	7	–	0
Bucknell	1	–	3	–	0	3	–	7	–	0
$ – Conference champion; Rankings from NCAA Division I-AA Football Committee poll

1986 Gateway Collegiate Athletic Conference football standings
	Conf.					Overall
Team	W		L		T	W		L		T
No. 3 Eastern Illinois $^	5	–	1	–	0	11	–	2	–	0
No. 17 Southern Illinois	4	–	2	–	0	7	–	4	–	0
Northern Iowa	4	–	2	–	0	7	–	3	–	1
Illinois State	3	–	3	–	0	5	–	5	–	0
Western Illinois	2	–	4	–	0	6	–	5	–	0
SW Missouri State	1	–	5	–	0	3	–	7	–	0
Indiana State	1	–	5	–	0	3	–	8	–	0
$ – Conference champion; ^ – NCAA Division I-AA playoff participant; Rankings from NCAA Division I-AA Football Committee poll

1986 Gulf Star Conference football standings
	Conf.					Overall
Team	W		L		T	W		L		T
No. 11 Sam Houston State $^	3	–	1	–	0	8	–	3	–	0
No. 12 Nicholls State ^	2	–	2	–	0	10	–	3	–	0
Northwestern State	2	–	2	–	0	5	–	5	–	1
Southwest Texas State	2	–	2	–	0	4	–	7	–	0
Stephen F. Austin	1	–	3	–	0	5	–	6	–	0
$ – Conference champion; ^ – NCAA Division I-AA playoff participant; Rankings from NCAA Division I-AA Football Committee poll

1986 Ivy League football standings
	Conf.					Overall
Team	W		L		T	W		L		T
No. 7 Penn $	7	–	0	–	0	10	–	0	–	0
Cornell	6	–	1	–	0	8	–	2	–	0
Brown	4	–	2	–	1	5	–	4	–	1
Dartmouth	3	–	3	–	1	3	–	6	–	1
Harvard	3	–	4	–	0	3	–	7	–	0
Yale	2	–	5	–	0	3	–	7	–	0
Princeton	2	–	5	–	0	2	–	8	–	0
Columbia	0	–	7	–	0	0	–	10	–	0
$ – Conference champion; Rankings from NCAA Division I-AA Football Committee poll

1986 Mid-Eastern Athletic Conference football standings
	Conf.					Overall
Team	W		L		T	W		L		T
No. 20 North Carolina A&T $^	4	–	1	–	0	9	–	3	–	0
Howard	3	–	2	–	0	8	–	3	–	0
Delaware State	3	–	2	–	0	7	–	4	–	0
South Carolina State	3	–	2	–	0	5	–	6	–	0
Bethune–Cookman	2	–	3	–	0	3	–	8	–	0
Morgan State	0	–	5	–	0	1	–	9	–	0
$ – Conference champion; ^ – NCAA Division I-AA playoff participant; Rankings from NCAA Division I-AA Football Committee poll

1986 Ohio Valley Conference football standings
	Conf.					Overall
Team	W		L		T	W		L		T
No. 10 Eastern Kentucky ^	6	–	1	–	0	10	–	3	–	1
No. 18 Murray State $^	6	–	1	–	0	7	–	4	–	1
Akron	4	–	3	–	0	7	–	4	–	0
Middle Tennessee	4	–	3	–	0	6	–	5	–	0
Morehead State	3	–	4	–	0	7	–	4	–	0
Austin Peay	3	–	4	–	0	5	–	6	–	0
Youngstown State	2	–	5	–	0	2	–	9	–	0
Tennessee Tech	0	–	7	–	0	0	–	10	–	0
$ – Conference champion; ^ – NCAA Division I-AA playoff participant; Rankings from NCAA Division I-AA Football Committee poll

1986 Southern Conference football standings
	Conf.					Overall
Team	W		L		T	W		L		T
No. 6 Appalachian State $^	6	–	0	–	1	9	–	2	–	1
Western Carolina	5	–	2	–	0	6	–	5	–	0
No. 15 Furman ^	4	–	2	–	1	7	–	3	–	2
East Tennessee State	4	–	3	–	0	6	–	5	–	0
Marshall	3	–	3	–	0	6	–	4	–	1
Chattanooga	2	–	4	–	0	4	–	7	–	0
VMI	1	–	5	–	0	1	–	10	–	0
The Citadel	0	–	6	–	0	3	–	8	–	0
Davidson	0	–	4	–	0	0	–	9	–	0
$ – Conference champion; ^ – NCAA Division I-AA playoff participant; Rankings from NCAA Division I-AA Football Committee poll

1986 Southland Conference football standings
	Conf.					Overall
Team	W		L		T	W		L		T
No. 2 Arkansas State $^	5	–	0	–	0	12	–	2	–	1
North Texas State	3	–	2	–	0	6	–	4	–	0
Louisiana Tech	3	–	2	–	0	6	–	4	–	1
Northeast Louisiana	3	–	2	–	0	5	–	6	–	0
McNeese State	1	–	4	–	0	2	–	9	–	0
Lamar	0	–	5	–	0	2	–	9	–	0
$ – Conference champion; ^ – NCAA Division I-AA playoff participant; Rankings from NCAA Division I-AA Football Committee poll

1986 Southwestern Athletic Conference football standings
	Conf.					Overall
Team	W		L		T	W		L		T
No. 9 Jackson State $^	7	–	0	–	0	9	–	3	–	0
Alcorn State	5	–	2	–	0	5	–	5	–	0
Grambling State	4	–	3	–	0	7	–	4	–	0
Southern	4	–	3	–	0	5	–	5	–	1
Mississippi Valley State	3	–	3	–	1	4	–	4	–	1
Alabama State	2	–	5	–	0	4	–	7	–	0
Texas Southern	1	–	5	–	1	2	–	8	–	1
Prairie View A&M	1	–	6	–	0	3	–	8	–	0
$ – Conference champion; ^ – NCAA Division I-AA playoff participant; Rankings from NCAA Division I-AA Football Committee poll

1986 Yankee Conference football standings
	Conf.					Overall
Team	W		L		T	W		L		T
No. 13 Delaware +^	5	–	2	–	0	9	–	4	–	0
No. 19 Connecticut +	5	–	2	–	0	8	–	3	–	0
UMass +	5	–	2	–	0	8	–	3	–	0
New Hampshire	4	–	3	–	0	7	–	4	–	0
Maine	3	–	4	–	0	7	–	4	–	0
Richmond	3	–	4	–	0	4	–	7	–	0
Boston University	3	–	4	–	0	4	–	7	–	0
Rhode Island	0	–	7	–	0	1	–	10	–	0
+ – Conference co-champions; ^ – NCAA Division I-AA playoff participant; Rankings from NCAA Division I-AA Football Committee poll

1986 NCAA Division I-AA independents football standings
	Conf.			Overall
Team	W	L	T	W		L		T
No. 4 Georgia Southern ^		–		13	–	2	–	0
No. 14 Tennessee State ^		–		10	–	2	–	1
No. 8 William & Mary ^		–		9	–	3	–	0
Eastern Washington		–		5	–	5	–	0
James Madison		–		5	–	5	–	1
Florida A&M		–		5	–	6	–	0
Northeastern		–		4	–	6	–	0
Western Kentucky		–		4	–	6	–	1
^ – NCAA Division I-AA playoff participant; Rankings from NCAA Division I-AA Football Committee poll

== Conference champions ==
Conference Champions

Big Sky Conference – Nevada
Colonial League – Holy Cross
Gateway Collegiate Athletic Conference – Eastern Illinois
Gulf Star Conference – Sam Houston State
Ivy League – Penn
Mid-Eastern Athletic Conference – North Carolina A&T
Ohio Valley Conference – Murray State
Southern Conference – Appalachian State
Southland Conference – Arkansas State
Southwestern Athletic Conference – Jackson State
Yankee Conference – Connecticut, Delaware, and Massachusetts

== Postseason ==
The playoffs expanded from twelve to sixteen teams this season, eliminating the bye for the top four seeds.

The I-AA playoff field remained at sixteen through the 2009 season, expanding to twenty in 2010 and 24 in 2013.

=== NCAA Division I-AA playoff bracket ===
The top four teams were seeded, with remaining teams placed in the bracket based on geographical considerations.

First Round; November 29; Campus sites
Idaho	7
1	Nevada*	27
Tennessee State	32
Jackson State*	23
North Carolina A&T	21
4	Georgia Southern*	52
Nicholls State	28
Appalachian State*	26
Sam Houston State	7
2	Arkansas State*	48
Delaware	51
William & Mary*	21
Murray State	21
3	Eastern Illinois*	28
Eastern Kentucky	23
Furman*	10

Quarterfinals; December 6 Campus sites
1	Nevada*	33
Tennessee State	6
4	Georgia Southern*	55
Nicholls State	31
2	Arkansas State	55
Delaware*	14
3	Eastern Illinois*	22
Eastern Kentucky	24

Semifinals; December 13; Campus sites
1	Nevada*	38
4	Georgia Southern	48
2	Arkansas State*	24
Eastern Kentucky	10

National Championship Game; December 19; Tacoma Dome; Tacoma, Washington
4	Georgia Southern	48
2	Arkansas State	21

* Denotes host institution
