= 1986 NCAA Division I-AA football rankings =

The 1986 NCAA Division I-AA football rankings are from the NCAA Division I-AA football committee. This is for the 1986 season.

== Legend ==
	Increase in ranking
	Decrease in ranking
	Not ranked previous week
(#–#)	Win–loss record
(Italics)	Number of first place votes
т	Tied with team above or below also with this symbol

== NCAA Division I-AA Football Committee poll ==
	Preseason	Week 1 Sept 16	Week 2 Sept 23	Week 3 Sept 30	Week 4 Oct 7	Week 5 Oct 14	Week 6 Oct 21	Week 7 Oct 28	Week 8 Nov 4	Week 9 Nov 11	Week 10 Nov 18	Week 11 Nov 25	
1.	Georgia Southern (4)	Nevada (2–0)	Nevada (3–0) (3)	Nevada (4–0) (3)	Nevada (5–0) (3)	Nevada (6–0) (3)	Nevada (7–0) (4)	Nevada (8–0) (4)	Nevada (9–0) (4)	Nevada (10–0) (4)	Nevada (10–0) (4)	Nevada (11–0) (4)	1.
2.	Nevada	Arkansas State (3–0)	Arkansas State (3–0–1)	Arkansas State (4–0–1)	Arkansas State (4–0–1)	Georgia Southern (5–1) (1)	Morehead State (6–0)	Arkansas State (6–1–1)	Arkansas State (6–1–1) т	Arkansas State (7–1–1) т	Arkansas State (8–1–1) т	Arkansas State (9–1–1)	2.
3.	Northern Iowa	Furman (1–0–1)	Furman (2–0–1)	Furman (3–0–1)	Georgia Southern (4–1) (1)	Morehead State (5–0)	William & Mary (6–0)	Holy Cross (7–0)	Holy Cross (8–0) т	Holy Cross (9–0) т	Holy Cross (10–0) т	Eastern Illinois (10–1)	3.
4.	Middle Tennessee State	Georgia Southern (1–1)	Georgia Southern (2–1) (1)	Georgia Southern (3–1) (1)	Morehead State (4–0)	William & Mary (5–0)	Arkansas State (5–1–1)	Nicholls State (8–0)	Eastern Illinois (8–1)	Eastern Illinois (9–1)	Eastern Illinois (10–1)	Georgia Southern (9–2)	4.
5.	Appalachian State	Eastern Washington (2–0)	William & Mary (3–0)	Morehead State (4–0) т	William & Mary (4–0)	Arkansas State (4–1–1)	Appalachian State (6–1)	Tennessee State (8–0)	Georgia Southern (6–2)	Georgia Southern (7–2)	Georgia Southern (8–2)	Holy Cross (10–1)	5.
6.	Delaware	Northern Iowa (1–0–1)	Eastern Washington (2–0)	William & Mary (3–0) т	Appalachian State (4–1)	Appalachian State (5–1)	Holy Cross (6–0)	Eastern Illinois (7–1)	Penn (7–0)	Penn (8–0)	Penn (9–0)	Appalachian State (9–1–1)	6.
7.	Arkansas State	Appalachian State (2–1)	Tennessee State (3–0)	Delaware State (3–0)	Tennessee State (5–0)	Holy Cross (5–0)	Tennessee State (7–0)	Appalachian State (6–1–1)	Appalachian State (6–1–1)	Appalachian State (7–1–1)	Appalachian State (8–1–1)	Penn (10–0)	7.
8.	Eastern Washington	Tennessee State (3–0)	Delaware State (3–0)	Appalachian State (3–1)	Northern Iowa (3–0–1)	Tennessee State (6–0)	Eastern Illinois (6–1) т	Penn (6–0)	William & Mary (7–1)	William & Mary (8–1)	Tennessee State (9–0–1)	William & Mary (9–2)	8.
9.	Furman т	William & Mary (2–0)	Morehead State (3–0)	Tennessee State (4–0)	Holy Cross (4–0) т	Eastern Illinois (5–1) т	Georgia Southern (5–2) т	Georgia Southern (5–2)	Tennessee State (8–0–1)	Tennessee State (9–0–1)	William & Mary (8–2)	Jackson State (9–2)	9.
10.	Richmond т	Delaware State (2–0)	Appalachian State (2–1)	Northern Iowa (2–0–1)	Nicholls State (5–0) т	Nicholls State (6–0) т	Nicholls State (7–0)	William & Mary (6–1)	Nicholls State (8–1)	Akron (7–2) т	Jackson State (8–2)	Eastern Kentucky (8–2–1)	10.
11.	Louisiana Tech	Eastern Kentucky (1–0)	Northern Iowa (1–0–1)	Holy Cross (3–0)	Eastern Illinois (4–1)	Furman (3–1–1)	Penn (5–0)	New Hampshire (6–1)	New Hampshire (7–1)	Jackson State (8–2) т	Delaware (8–2)	Sam Houston State (9–2)	11.
12.	Northeast Louisiana	UMass (2–0) (Note: In the actual printed polls, UMass was listed as Massachusetts)	UMass (2–0)	Nicholls State (4–0)	Furman (3–1–1)	Idaho (4–1)	Delaware State (5–1)	Akron (5–2) т	Akron (6–2) т	Delaware (7–2)	Eastern Kentucky (7–2–1)	Nicholls State (9–2)	12.
13.	Eastern Kentucky	Delaware (1–1)	Louisiana Tech (2–1) т	Grambling State (3–0)	Idaho (4–1)	New Hampshire (5–1)	New Hampshire (5–1)	Jackson State (7–2) т	Jackson State (7–2) т	North Carolina A&T (8–1)	North Carolina A&T (9–1)	Delaware (8–3)	13.
14.	Jackson State	Grambling State (1–0)	Maine (3–0) т	Jackson State (4–1) т	New Hampshire (4–1)	Delaware (4–1) т	North Carolina A&T (6–0)	Morehead State (6–1) т	Delaware (6–2) т	Eastern Kentucky (6–2–1)	Sam Houston State (8–2)	Tennessee State (9–1–1)	14.
15.	Boise State	Louisiana Tech (1–1)	Eastern Illinois (3–1)	UMass (3–0) т	Delaware (3–1)	Delaware State (4–1) т	Idaho (4–2)	Delaware (5–2)	Delaware State (7–1) т	Sam Houston State (7–2)	Cornell (8–2)	Furman (7–2–2)	15.
16.	Colgate	Akron (2–0)	Grambling State (2–0)	Eastern Illinois (3–1)	Southern (4–1) т	Northern Iowa (3–1–1)	Delaware (4–2)	Delaware State (6–1)	Southern Illinois (7–3)	Cornell (7–1)	Nicholls State (8–2)	Idaho (8–3)	16.
17.	Delaware State	Middle Tennessee State (1–1)	Nicholls State (3–0)	Idaho (3–1)	Stephen F. Austin (4–0) т	Penn (4–0)	Akron (4–2)	UMass (6–1)	Marshall (6–2–1)	Nicholls State (8–2)	Akron (7–3)	Southern Illinois (7–4)	17.
18.	Eastern Illinois	North Texas State (1–0)	Jackson State (3–1)	Connecticut (3–0)	North Carolina A&T (5–0)	North Carolina A&T (6–0)	Furman (3–2–1) т	Southern Illinois (6–3)	Eastern Kentucky (5–2–1)	Northern Arizona (7–3)	UMass (8–2)	Murray State (7–3–1) т	18.
19.	William & Mary	Richmond (1–1)	Delaware (2–1)	Delaware (3–1)	Penn (3–0)	Stephen F. Austin (4–1)	Stephen F. Austin (4–2) т	North Texas State (5–2)	Louisiana Tech (5–3–1)	Delaware State (7–2)	Furman (6–2–2)	Connecticut (8–3) т	19.
20.	North Texas State	Southern Illinois (2–1)	Connecticut (2–0)	Eastern Kentucky (2–0–1)	Grambling State (3–1)	Louisiana Tech (4–2)	Southern Illinois (5–3)	Marshall (5–2–1)	North Carolina A&T (7–1)	New Hampshire (7–2)	Southern Illinois (7–4) т	North Carolina A&T (9–2)	20.
21.											Idaho (7–3) т		21.
	Preseason	Week 1 Sept 16	Week 2 Sept 23	Week 3 Sept 30	Week 4 Oct 7	Week 5 Oct 14	Week 6 Oct 21	Week 7 Oct 28	Week 8 Nov 4	Week 9 Nov 11	Week 10 Nov 18	Week 11 Nov 25	
		Dropped: 12 Northeast Louisiana; 14 Jackson State; 15 Boise State; 16 Colgate; 18 Eastern Illinois	Dropped: 11 Eastern Kentucky; 16 Akron; 17 Middle Tennessee State; 18 North Texas State; 19 Richmond; 20 Southern Illinois	Dropped: 6 Eastern Washington; 13 Louisiana Tech; 14 Maine	Dropped: 7 Delaware State; 14 Jackson State; 15 UMass; 18 Connecticut; 20 Eastern Kentucky	Dropped: 16 Southern; 20 Grambling State	Dropped: 16 Northern Iowa; 20 Louisiana Tech	Dropped: 14 North Carolina A&T; 15 Idaho; 18 Furman; 19 Stephen F. Austin; 20 Southern Illinois	Dropped: 14 Morehead State; 17 UMass; 19 North Texas State	Dropped: 16 Southern Illinois; 17 Marshall; 19 Louisiana Tech	Dropped: 18 Northern Arizona; 19 Delaware State; 20 New Hampshire	Dropped: 15 Cornell; 17 Akron; 18 UMass	
