= I-74 Rivalry =

American college sports rivalry

"The War on 74"
- Illinois State Redbirds Bradley Braves
- Sport: Multi-Sport
- First meeting: January 25, 1905 (Men's Basketball)

Locations of Illinois State and Bradley

The "War on 74" (unsuccessfully referred to as "I-74 Rivalry" or "Battle for 74") is an annual collegiate athletics rivalry series between the Illinois State Redbirds and the Bradley Braves.

The first men's series was for basketball in 1905 and the first women's series was for volleyball in 1974.

The name references the two university's forty (thirty-five "as the crow flies") mile proximity and their shared access to Interstate 74, which spans from Cincinnati, Ohio, through central Indiana and central Illinois (specifically Normal and Peoria), terminating in Davenport, Iowa.

== Background ==
Illinois State University is a public institution founded in 1857; Bradley University is a private institution founded in 1897.

For men's athletics, the Redbirds joined the Missouri Valley Conference (MVC) in 1980 and the Braves re-joined the MVC in 1955 (initial membership spanned from 1948 to 1952).

In women's athletics, beginning with 1982 until 1992, the Redbirds and Braves competed in the newly formed Gateway Collegiate Athletic Conference (GCAC), a women's only conference (the MVC did not sponsor women's athletics until 1992); it was absorbed into the MVC starting with 1992-93 academic calendar and all GCAC records were recognized as MVC.

The schools have been in-state rivals since their founding; however, the rivalry intensified upon Illinois State's reclassification in 1970 from the NCAA College Division (further split in 1973 into NCAA Division II (D-II) and NCAA Division III (D-III)) to the NCAA University Division (replaced in 1973 by NCAA Division I (D-I)). Women's athletics competed under the Association for Intercollegiate Athletics for Women (AIAW) from 1971 to 1982; the NCAA initially recognized women's athletics in 1981 and became the sole organization the subsequent academic year.

== Baseball ==
The Redbirds and Braves first played in baseball in 1921.

They have combined for seven Missouri Valley Conference regular season championships (Illinois State 3 (one outright), Bradley 4 (three outright)), five regular season division championships (Illinois State 0, Bradley 5 (all outright)) and seven tournament championships (Illinois State 2, Bradley 5).

They have also combined for eleven postseason tournament appearances (Illinois State 4 (four National Collegiate Athletic Association (NCAA) Division I Tournament), Bradley 7 (seven NCAA)).

NOTE: championship/postseason information as of conclusion for 2024-25 season.

| Illinois State victories | Bradley victories | Ties |

| No. | Date | Location | Winner | Score |
|---|---|---|---|---|
| 1 | May 31, 1921 | Normal, IL | Illinois State | 6–4 |
| 2 | June 1, 1921 | Peoria, IL | Bradley | 7–1 |
| 3 | May 29, 1922 | Normal, IL | Bradley | 18–5 |
| 4 | April 26, 1923 | Peoria, IL | Bradley | 10–3 |
| 5 | May 6, 1924 | Normal, IL | Bradley | 12–4 |
| 6 | April 28, 1925 | Normal, IL | Bradley | 8–2 |
| 7 | April 10, 1926 | Peoria, IL | Bradley | 28–2 |
| 8 | May 27, 1926 | Normal, IL | Bradley | 16–2 |
| 9 | May 7, 1927 | Peoria, IL | Bradley | 7–2 |
| 10 | May 30, 1927 | Normal, IL | Bradley | 8–3 |
| 11 | May 22, 1928 | Normal, IL | Bradley | 10–6 |
| 12 | June 1, 1928 | Peoria, IL | Bradley | 17–3 |
| 13 | April 18, 1929 | Peoria, IL | Bradley | 3–1 |
| 14 | June 5, 1929 | Normal, IL | Illinois State | 4–3 |
| 15 | May 15, 1930 | Peoria, IL | Bradley | 6–0 |
| 16 | April 26, 1933 | Peoria, IL | Bradley | 10–6 |
| 17 | June 1, 1933 | Normal, IL | Illinois State | 10–9 |
| 18 | April 27, 1934 | Peoria, IL | Illinois State | 7–3 |
| 19 | June 1, 1934 | Normal, IL | Illinois State | 5–4 |
| 20 | May 30, 1939 | Normal, IL | Bradley | 4–3 |
| 21 | May 29, 1940 | Peoria, IL | Bradley | 1–0 |
| 22 | May 30, 1940 | Normal, IL | Bradley | 4–0 |
| 23 | June 4, 1940 | Normal, IL | Bradley | 14–7 |
| 24 | April 16, 1942 | Normal, IL | Illinois State | 6–4 |
| 25 | May 14, 1942 | Peoria, IL | Bradley | 6–5 |
| 26 | May 19, 1953 | Normal, IL | Bradley | 10–5 |
| 27 | May 29, 1954 | Normal, IL | Illinois State | 4–3 |
| 28 | May 30, 1954 | Peoria, IL | Bradley | 8–7 |
| 29 | May 10, 1955 | Peoria, IL | Bradley | 5–3 |
| 30 | May 24, 1955 | Normal, IL | Illinois State | 4–3 |
| 31 | May 4, 1956 | Normal, IL | Illinois State | 15–5 |
| 32 | May 14, 1957 | Normal, IL | Bradley | 7–1 |
| 33 | May 28, 1957 | Peoria, IL | Bradley | 15–6 |
| 34 | April 29, 1958 | Peoria, IL (Bradley Field) | Bradley | 24–3 |
| 35 | May 27, 1958 | Normal, IL | Illinois State | 6–2 |
| 36 | May 4, 1959 | Peoria, IL (Bradley Field) | Bradley | 6–4 |
| 37 | May 12, 1959 | Peoria, IL (Bradley Field) | Bradley | 14–3 |
| 38 | May 10, 1960 | Peoria, IL (Bradley Field) | Bradley | 1–0 |
| 39 | May 9, 1961 | Normal, IL | Bradley | 2–0 |
| 40 | May 16, 1961 | Peoria, IL (Bradley Field) | Bradley | 9–4 |
| 41 | May 1, 1962 | Peoria, IL (Bradley Field) | Illinois State | 3–2 |
| 42 | April 23, 1963 | Normal, IL | Illinois State | 4–2 |
| 43 | May 14, 1963 | Peoria, IL (Bradley Field) | Bradley | 13–6 |
| 44 | April 27, 1965 | Normal, IL | Illinois State | 8–5 |
| 45 | May 11, 1965 | East Peoria, IL (Tom Connor Field) | Bradley | 14–1 |
| 46 | May 3, 1966 | Normal, IL | Illinois State | 5–4 |
| 47 | April 25, 1967 | Normal, IL | Bradley | 5–4 |
| 48 | May 23, 1967 | East Peoria, IL (Tom Connor Field) | Bradley | 8–6 |
| 49 | May 14, 1968 | Normal, IL | Illinois State | 6–5 |
| 50 | May 6, 1969 | Normal, IL | Illinois State | 6–3 |
| 51 | April 7, 1970 | Peoria, IL (Meinen Field) | Illinois State | 11–2 |
| 52 | April 21, 1970 | Normal, IL | Illinois State | 1–0 |
| 53 | April 20, 1971 | Peoria, IL (Meinen Field) | Bradley | 4–1 |
| 54 | April 18, 1972 | Peoria, IL (Meinen Field) | Illinois State | 16–7 |
| 55 | April 18, 1972 | Peoria, IL (Meinen Field) | Illinois State | 9–1 |
| 56 | April 24, 1973 | Normal, IL | Illinois State | 4–1 |
| 57 | April 24, 1973 | Normal, IL | Bradley | 7–1 |
| 58 | April 9, 1974 | Peoria, IL (Meinen Field) | Illinois State | 2–1 |
| 59 | April 9, 1974 | Peoria, IL (Meinen Field) | Illinois State | 5–3 |
| 60 | May 7, 1974 | Normal, IL | Illinois State | 8–6 |
| 61 | April 8, 1975 | Normal, IL | Illinois State | 7–5 |
| 62 | April 8, 1975 | Normal, IL | Bradley | 9–8 |
| 63 | May 6, 1975 | Peoria, IL (Meinen Field) | Bradley | 9–2 |
| 64 | April 6, 1976 | Peoria, IL (Meinen Field) | Illinois State | 8–4 |
| 65 | April 6, 1976 | Peoria, IL (Meinen Field) | Illinois State | 2–1 |
| 66 | May 5, 1976 | Normal, IL | Illinois State | 3–2 |
| 67 | April 26, 1977 | Normal, IL | Illinois State | 6–1 |
| 68 | April 26, 1977 | Normal, IL | Illinois State | 3–0 |
| 69 | May 4, 1977 | Peoria, IL (Meinen Field) | Illinois State | 4–1 |
| 70 | April 25, 1978 | Peoria, IL (Meinen Field) | Illinois State | 9–0 |
| 71 | April 25, 1978 | Peoria, IL (Meinen Field) | Illinois State | 7–1 |
| 72 | May 3, 1978 | Normal, IL | Illinois State | 5–1 |
| 73 | April 23, 1980 | Normal, IL | Illinois State | 2–0 |
| 74 | April 23, 1980 | Normal, IL | Illinois State | 7–1 |
| 75 | April 30, 1980 | Peoria, IL (Meinen Field) | Illinois State | 2–0 |
| 76 | April 30, 1980 | Peoria, IL (Meinen Field) | Bradley | 11–3 |
| 77 | April 21, 1981 | Peoria, IL (Meinen Field) | Bradley | 7–3 |
| 78 | April 21, 1981 | Peoria, IL (Meinen Field) | Bradley | 13–8 |
| 79 | May 1, 1982 | Normal, IL | Bradley | 6–2 |
| 80 | May 1, 1982 | Normal, IL | Illinois State | 14–6 |
| 81 | May 2, 1982 | Normal, IL | Bradley | 6–0 |
| 82 | May 2, 1982 | Normal, IL | Illinois State | 4–1 |
| 83 | April 30, 1983 | Peoria, IL (Meinen Field) | Illinois State | 4–2 |
| 84 | April 30, 1983 | Peoria, IL (Meinen Field) | Bradley | 5–4 |
| 85 | May 1, 1983 | Peoria, IL (Meinen Field) | Illinois State | 6–1 |
| 86 | May 1, 1983 | Peoria, IL (Meinen Field) | Illinois State | 5–1 |
| 87 | May 5, 1984 | Normal, IL | Bradley | 7–1 |
| 88 | May 5, 1984 | Normal, IL | Bradley | 6–4 |
| 89 | May 6, 1984 | Normal, IL | Illinois State | 13–7 |
| 90 | May 6, 1984 | Normal, IL | Illinois State | 5–1 |
| 91 | May 4, 1985 | Peoria, IL (Meinen Field) | Illinois State | 9–7 |
| 92 | May 4, 1985 | Peoria, IL (Meinen Field) | Illinois State | 15–13 |
| 93 | May 5, 1985 | Peoria, IL (Meinen Field) | Bradley | 11–9 |
| 94 | May 5, 1985 | Peoria, IL (Meinen Field) | Illinois State | 12–2 |
| 95 | May 11, 1985 | Wichita, KS (Eck Stadium) | Bradley | 10–7 |
| 96 | March 15, 1986 | Panama City, FL | Bradley | 6–1 |
| 97 | May 3, 1986 | Normal, IL | Bradley | 6–2 |
| 98 | May 3, 1986 | Normal, IL | Bradley | 9–5 |
| 99 | May 4, 1986 | Normal, IL | Bradley | 1–0 |
| 100 | May 4, 1986 | Normal, IL | Illinois State | 6–5 |
| 101 | May 2, 1987 | Peoria, IL (Meinen Field) | Illinois State | 3–0 |
| 102 | May 2, 1987 | Peoria, IL (Meinen Field) | Illinois State | 3–0 |
| 103 | May 3, 1987 | Peoria, IL (Meinen Field) | Illinois State | 4–3 |
| 104 | May 3, 1987 | Peoria, IL (Meinen Field) | Bradley | 6–1 |
| 105 | May 15, 1987 | Wichita, KS (Eck Stadium) | Bradley | 5–2 |
| 106 | May 7, 1988 | Normal, IL (Duffy Bass Field) | Bradley | 6–5 |
| 107 | May 7, 1988 | Normal, IL (Duffy Bass Field) | Bradley | 6–3 |
| 108 | May 8, 1988 | Normal, IL (Duffy Bass Field) | Bradley | 6–3 |
| 109 | May 8, 1988 | Normal, IL (Duffy Bass Field) | Illinois State | 8–7 |
| 110 | May 6, 1989 | Peoria, IL (Meinen Field) | Bradley | 5–0 |
| 111 | May 6, 1989 | Peoria, IL (Meinen Field) | Illinois State | 5–3 |
| 112 | May 7, 1989 | Peoria, IL (Meinen Field) | Illinois State | 9–7 |
| 113 | May 7, 1989 | Peoria, IL (Meinen Field) | Illinois State | 7–0 |
| 114 | May 5, 1990 | Normal, IL (Duffy Bass Field) | Illinois State | 13–4 |
| 115 | May 6, 1990 | Normal, IL (Duffy Bass Field) | Bradley | 8–6 |
| 116 | May 6, 1990 | Normal, IL (Duffy Bass Field) | Illinois State | 8–7 |
| 117 | May 10, 1991 | Peoria, IL (Meinen Field) | Illinois State | 19–8 |
| 118 | May 10, 1991 | Peoria, IL (Meinen Field) | Illinois State | 17–4 |
| 119 | May 11, 1991 | Peoria, IL (Meinen Field) | Bradley | 9–8 |

| No. | Date | Location | Winner | Score |
|---|---|---|---|---|
| 120 | May 11, 1991 | Peoria, IL (Meinen Field) | Bradley | 1–0 |
| 121 | May 8, 1992 | Normal, IL (Duffy Bass Field) | Bradley | 2–0 |
| 122 | May 9, 1992 | Normal, IL (Duffy Bass Field) | Illinois State | 4–3 |
| 123 | May 9, 1992 | Normal, IL (Duffy Bass Field) | Illinois State | 6–3 |
| 124 | May 14, 1992 | Wichita, KS (Eck Stadium) | Bradley | 4–2 |
| 125 | May 8, 1993 | Peoria, IL (Pete Vonachen Stadium) | Bradley | 8–6 |
| 126 | May 8, 1993 | Peoria, IL (Pete Vonachen Stadium) | Illinois State | 7–5 |
| 127 | May 9, 1993 | Peoria, IL (Pete Vonachen Stadium) | Illinois State | 9–7 |
| 128 | April 2, 1994 | Bloomington, IL | Bradley | 10–3 |
| 129 | April 2, 1994 | Bloomington, IL | Bradley | 11–3 |
| 130 | April 3, 1994 | Bloomington, IL | Illinois State | 10–5 |
| 131 | May 20, 1994 | Wichita, KS (Eck Stadium) | Illinois State | 12–4 |
| 132 | May 21, 1994 | Wichita, KS (Eck Stadium) | Illinois State | 18–10 |
| 133 | May 6, 1995 | Peoria, IL (Pete Vonachen Stadium) | Bradley | 8–1 |
| 134 | May 6, 1995 | Peoria, IL (Pete Vonachen Stadium) | Bradley | 14–11 |
| 135 | May 7, 1995 | Peoria, IL (Pete Vonachen Stadium) | Bradley | 5–4 |
| 136 | May 7, 1995 | Peoria, IL (Pete Vonachen Stadium) | Illinois State | 7–6 |
| 137 | April 10, 1996 | Normal, IL (Duffy Bass Field) | Bradley | 10–0 |
| 138 | April 10, 1996 | Normal, IL (Duffy Bass Field) | Illinois State | 4–3 |
| 139 | April 24, 1996 | Peoria, IL (Pete Vonachen Stadium) | Illinois State | 10–4 |
| 140 | April 24, 1996 | Peoria, IL (Pete Vonachen Stadium) | Bradley | 3–1 |
| 141 | April 9, 1997 | Peoria, IL (Pete Vonachen Stadium) | Illinois State | 11–0 |
| 142 | April 9, 1997 | Peoria, IL (Pete Vonachen Stadium) | Illinois State | 6–4 |
| 143 | April 30, 1997 | Normal, IL (Duffy Bass Field) | Illinois State | 9–8 |
| 144 | April 8, 1998 | Normal, IL (Duffy Bass Field) | Illinois State | 9–8 |
| 145 | April 8, 1998 | Normal, IL (Duffy Bass Field) | Illinois State | 2–1 |
| 146 | April 22, 1998 | Peoria, IL (Pete Vonachen Stadium) | Illinois State | 4–2 |
| 147 | April 22, 1998 | Peoria, IL (Pete Vonachen Stadium) | Bradley | 10–4 |
| 148 | May 7, 1999 | Peoria, IL (Pete Vonachen Stadium) | Bradley | 16–4 |
| 149 | May 8, 1999 | Peoria, IL (Pete Vonachen Stadium) | Illinois State | 4–3 |
| 150 | May 8, 1999 | Peoria, IL (Pete Vonachen Stadium) | Bradley | 7–6 |
| 151 | May 9, 1999 | Peoria, IL (Pete Vonachen Stadium) | Bradley | 14–11 |
| 152 | April 21, 2000 | Normal, IL (Duffy Bass Field) | Illinois State | 16–9 |
| 153 | April 22, 2000 | Normal, IL (Duffy Bass Field) | Bradley | 12–2 |
| 154 | April 22, 2000 | Normal, IL (Duffy Bass Field) | Bradley | 17–11 |
| 155 | April 23, 2000 | Normal, IL (Duffy Bass Field) | Bradley | 8–4 |
| 156 | May 11, 2001 | Peoria, IL (Pete Vonachen Stadium) | Illinois State | 5–3 |
| 157 | May 12, 2001 | Peoria, IL (Pete Vonachen Stadium) | Illinois State | 9–3 |
| 158 | May 12, 2001 | Peoria, IL (Pete Vonachen Stadium) | Bradley | 10–3 |
| 159 | May 13, 2001 | Peoria, IL (Pete Vonachen Stadium) | Illinois State | 8–3 |
| 160 | May 3, 2002 | Normal, IL (Duffy Bass Field) | Illinois State | 6–5 |
| 161 | May 4, 2002 | Normal, IL (Duffy Bass Field) | Illinois State | 6–3 |
| 162 | May 4, 2002 | Normal, IL (Duffy Bass Field) | Bradley | 9–4 |
| 163 | May 5, 2002 | Normal, IL (Duffy Bass Field) | Illinois State | 7–6 |
| 164 | May 9, 2003 | Peoria, IL (O'Brien Field) | Illinois State | 9–8 |
| 165 | May 10, 2003 | Peoria, IL (O'Brien Field) | Illinois State | 7–5 |
| 166 | May 10, 2003 | Peoria, IL (O'Brien Field) | Illinois State | 10–4 |
| 167 | May 11, 2003 | Peoria, IL (O'Brien Field) | Illinois State | 5–4 |
| 168 | May 20, 2004 | Normal, IL (Duffy Bass Field) | Illinois State | 5–4 |
| 169 | May 21, 2004 | Normal, IL (Duffy Bass Field) | Bradley | 9–3 |
| 170 | May 21, 2004 | Normal, IL (Duffy Bass Field) | Illinois State | 13–6 |
| 171 | May 22, 2004 | Normal, IL (Duffy Bass Field) | Bradley | 5–3 |
| 172 | April 23, 2005 | Peoria, IL (O'Brien Field) | Bradley | 4–1 |
| 173 | April 24, 2005 | Peoria, IL (O'Brien Field) | Bradley | 13–8 |
| 174 | April 24, 2005 | Peoria, IL (O'Brien Field) | Illinois State | 2–1 |
| 175 | April 14, 2006 | Normal, IL (Duffy Bass Field) | Bradley | 5–0 |
| 176 | April 15, 2006 | Normal, IL (Duffy Bass Field) | Bradley | 4–0 |
| 177 | April 15, 2006 | Normal, IL (Duffy Bass Field) | Illinois State | 6–3 |
| 178 | April 27, 2007 | Peoria, IL (O'Brien Field) | Bradley | 9–6 |
| 179 | April 28, 2007 | Peoria, IL (O'Brien Field) | Bradley | 7–4 |
| 180 | April 29, 2007 | Peoria, IL (O'Brien Field) | Bradley | 9–8 |
| 181 | May 2, 2008 | Normal, IL (Duffy Bass Field) | Illinois State | 16–12 |
| 182 | May 3, 2008 | Normal, IL (Duffy Bass Field) | Bradley | 12–2 ^{8 Inn} |
| 183 | May 4, 2008 | Normal, IL (Duffy Bass Field) | Illinois State | 5–1 |
| 184 | May 8, 2009 | Peoria, IL (O'Brien Field) | Illinois State | 8–5 ^{11 Inn} |
| 185 | May 9, 2009 | Peoria, IL (O'Brien Field) | Bradley | 5–3 |
| 186 | May 10, 2009 | Peoria, IL (O'Brien Field) | Illinois State | 10–9 ^{10 Inn} |
| 187 | May 14, 2010 | Normal, IL (Duffy Bass Field) | Illinois State | 10–4 |
| 188 | May 15, 2010 | Normal, IL (Duffy Bass Field) | Illinois State | 7–5 |
| 189 | May 16, 2010 | Normal, IL (Duffy Bass Field) | Bradley | 8–7 ^{14 Inn} |
| 190 | May 25, 2010 | Wichita, KS | Illinois State | 3–0 |
| 191 | April 16, 2011 | Peoria, IL (O'Brien Field) | Illinois State | 4–1 |
| 192 | April 16, 2011 | Peoria, IL (O'Brien Field) | Illinois State | 12–2 ^{7 Inn} |
| 193 | April 17, 2011 | Peoria, IL (O'Brien Field) | Illinois State | 12–7 |
| 194 | April 20, 2012 | Normal, IL (Duffy Bass Field) | Bradley | 13–2 ^{7 Inn} |
| 195 | April 21, 2012 | Normal, IL (Duffy Bass Field) | Illinois State | 12–3 |
| 196 | April 22, 2012 | Normal, IL (Duffy Bass Field) | Illinois State | 13–5 |
| 197 | April 26, 2013 | Peoria, IL (Chiefs Stadium) | Illinois State | 4–0 |
| 198 | April 27, 2013 | Peoria, IL (Chiefs Stadium) | Illinois State | 9–5 |
| 199 | April 28, 2013 | Peoria, IL (Chiefs Stadium) | Illinois State | 8–5 |
| 200 | May 21, 2013 | Normal, IL (Duffy Bass Field) | Illinois State | 11–1 ^{8 Inn} |
| 201 | March 21, 2014 | Terre Haute, IN (Bob Warn Field) | Illinois State | 13–1 ^{7 Inn} |
| 202 | March 21, 2014 | Terre Haute, IN (Bob Warn Field) | Illinois State | 7–6 |
| 203 | March 22, 2014 | Terre Haute, IN (Bob Warn Field) | Bradley | 3–1 |
| 204 | May 9, 2015 | Peoria, IL (Dozer Park) | Bradley | 7–3 |
| 205 | May 9, 2015 | Peoria, IL (Dozer Park) | Illinois State | 8–0 |
| 206 | May 10, 2015 | Peoria, IL (Dozer Park) | Illinois State | 13–4 |
| 207 | May 6, 2016 | Normal, IL (Duffy Bass Field) | Bradley | 10–2 |
| 208 | May 7, 2016 | Normal, IL (Duffy Bass Field) | Bradley | 5–3 |
| 209 | May 8, 2016 | Normal, IL (Duffy Bass Field) | Illinois State | 4–3 |
| 210 | April 21, 2017 | Peoria, IL (Dozer Park) | Bradley | 13–3 ^{7 Inn} |
| 211 | April 22, 2017 | Peoria, IL (Dozer Park) | Illinois State | 9–4 |
| 212 | April 23, 2017 | Peoria, IL (Dozer Park) | Bradley | 8–6 |
| 213 | May 4, 2018 | Normal, IL (Duffy Bass Field) | Bradley | 9–6 ^{13 Inn} |
| 214 | May 5, 2018 | Normal, IL (Duffy Bass Field) | Bradley | 9–3 |
| 215 | May 5, 2018 | Normal, IL (Duffy Bass Field) | Illinois State | 13–6 |
| 216 | May 23, 2018 | Dallas, TX (Horner Ballpark) | Bradley | 14–2 |
| 217 | May 10, 2019 | Peoria, IL (Dozer Park) | Illinois State | 1–0 |
| 218 | May 11, 2019 | Peoria, IL (Dozer Park) | Illinois State | 14–1 |
| 219 | May 12, 2019 | Peoria, IL (Dozer Park) | Bradley | 7–2 |
| 220 | May 20, 2021 | Peoria, IL (Dozer Park) | Illinois State | 6–4 ^{10 Inn} |
| 221 | May 21, 2021 | Peoria, IL (Dozer Park) | Bradley | 4–3 |
| 222 | May 22, 2021 | Peoria, IL (Dozer Park) | Bradley | 3–1 |
| 223 | April 22, 2022 | Normal, IL (Duffy Bass Field) | Bradley | 3–1 |
| 224 | April 23, 2022 | Normal, IL (Duffy Bass Field) | Illinois State | 9–3 |
| 225 | April 24, 2022 | Normal, IL (Duffy Bass Field) | Bradley | 8–2 |
| 226 | April 21, 2023 | Peoria, IL (Dozer Park) | Illinois State | 16–9 |
| 227 | April 22, 2023 | Peoria, IL (Dozer Park) | Illinois State | 9–0 |
| 228 | April 23, 2023 | Peoria, IL (Dozer Park) | Bradley | 19–3 |
| 229 | March 22, 2024 | Normal, IL (Duffy Bass Field) | Bradley | 9–8 |
| 230 | March 23, 2024 | Normal, IL (Duffy Bass Field) | Bradley | 12–6 |
| 231 | March 24, 2024 | Normal, IL (Duffy Bass Field) | Illinois State | 12–3 |
| 232 | April 18, 2025 | Peoria, IL (Dozer Park) | Bradley | 6–5 |
| 233 | April 19, 2025 | Peoria, IL (Dozer Park) | Bradley | 14–13 ^{12 Inn} |
| 234 | April 20, 2025 | Peoria, IL (Dozer Park) | Bradley | 7–5 |
| 235 | April 24, 2026 | Normal, IL (Duffy Bass Field) | Illinois State | 16–6 ^{8 Inn} |
| 236 | April 25, 2026 | Normal, IL (Duffy Bass Field) | Illinois State | 1–0 |
| 237 | April 26, 2026 | Normal, IL (Duffy Bass Field) | Illinois State | 8–5 |
Series: Illinois State leads 124–113

NOTE: information based on Bradley history; Illinois State history discrepancies are noted below.
• May 31, 1921 – May 8, 1988 games are not listed.
• May 5, 1990 – May 11, 2003 games are not listed.
• April 23, 2005 – April 24, 2005 games are not listed.
• May 25, 2010 game is not listed.

== Men's basketball ==
The Redbirds and Braves first played in men's basketball in 1905.

They have combined for thirteen Missouri Valley Conference regular season championships (Illinois State 6 (three outright), Bradley 7 (all outright)) and eight tournament championships (Illinois State 4, Bradley 4).

They have also combined for sixty postseason tournament appearances (Illinois State 22 (six National Collegiate Athletic Association (NCAA) Division I Tournament, fourteen National Invitation Tournament (NIT), two College Basketball Invitational (CBI)), Bradley 38 (nine NCAA, twenty-four NIT, one National Campus Basketball Tournament (NCBT)), one Collegiate Commissioners Association Tournament (CCAT), one CBI, two CollegeInsider Tournament (CIT))).

NOTE: Bradley earned the automatic qualification 2020 NCAA Tournament by virtue of winning their conference tournament; however, it was canceled before it was held due to COVID-19.

NOTE: championship/postseason information as of conclusion for 2024-25 season.

| Illinois State victories | Bradley victories | Ties |

| No. | Date | Location | Winner | Score |
|---|---|---|---|---|
| 1 | January 25, 1905 | Peoria, IL (Y M C A) | Illinois State | 39–13 |
| 2 | January 27, 1906 | Peoria, IL (Y M C A) | Illinois State | 45–16 |
| 3 | February 1, 1907 | Normal, IL (Gymnasium) | Illinois State | 46–12 |
| 4 | January 10, 1908 | Peoria, IL (Y M C A) | Bradley | 41–23 |
| 5 | January 23, 1909 | Normal, IL (Gymnasium) | Illinois State | 57–12 |
| 6 | January 22, 1910 | Peoria, IL (Bradley Institute Gymnasium) | Illinois State | 27–15 |
| 7 | January 18, 1911 | Normal, IL (Gymnasium) | Bradley | 25–18 |
| 8 | March 10, 1911 | Normal, IL (Gymnasium) | Bradley | 43–18 |
| 9 | February 16, 1912 | Normal, IL (Gymnasium) | Bradley | 23–22 |
| 10 | March 1, 1912 | Peoria, IL (Bradley Institute Gymnasium) | Bradley | 39–16 |
| 11 | January 23, 1913 | Normal, IL (Gymnasium) | Bradley | 22–21 |
| 12 | February 19, 1913 | Peoria, IL (Bradley Institute Gymnasium) | Bradley | 26–24 |
| 13 | January 20, 1914 | Normal, IL (Gymnasium) | Illinois State | 39–20 |
| 14 | February 28, 1914 | Normal, IL (Gymnasium) | Illinois State | 29–21 |
| 15 | March 7, 1914 | Peoria, IL (Bradley Institute Gymnasium) | Bradley | 27–19 |
| 16 | January 9, 1915 | Peoria, IL (Bradley Institute Gymnasium) | Bradley | 32–16 |
| 17 | January 28, 1916 | Normal, IL (Gymnasium) | Bradley | 20–12 |
| 18 | February 18, 1916 | Normal, IL (Gymnasium) | Bradley | 21–17 |
| 19 | March 4, 1916 | Bloomington, IL | Bradley | 17–13 |
| 20 | February 3, 1917 | Peoria, IL (Bradley Institute Gymnasium) | Bradley | 13–10 |
| 21 | March 1, 1917 | Decatur, IL | Illinois State | 18–16 |
| 22 | February 15, 1918 | Peoria, IL (Bradley Institute Gymnasium) | Bradley | 33–19 |
| 23 | March 1, 1918 | Peoria, IL (Bradley Institute Gymnasium) | Illinois State | 32–23 |
| 24 | January 29, 1919 | Normal, IL (Gymnasium) | Illinois State | 19–16 |
| 25 | February 28, 1919 | Peoria, IL (Bradley Institute Gymnasium) | Bradley | 23–17 |
| 26 | January 17, 1920 | Peoria, IL (Bradley Institute Gymnasium) | Illinois State | 29–10 |
| 27 | February 27, 1920 | Normal, IL (Gymnasium) | Illinois State | 21–16 |
| 28 | February 2, 1921 | Peoria, IL (Bradley Institute Gymnasium) | Illinois State | 29–21 |
| 29 | February 21, 1921 | Peoria, IL (Bradley Institute Gymnasium) | Bradley | 27–11 |
| 30 | January 11, 1922 | Normal, IL (Gymnasium) | Bradley | 29–24 |
| 31 | February 2, 1922 | Peoria, IL (Bradley Institute Gymnasium) | Bradley | 39–22 |
| 32 | January 10, 1923 | Peoria, IL (Bradley Institute Gymnasium) | Bradley | 25–23 |
| 33 | January 23, 1923 | Normal, IL (Gymnasium) | Bradley | 22–20 |
| 34 | December 15, 1923 | Peoria, IL (Bradley Institute Gymnasium) | Bradley | 37–10 |
| 35 | February 5, 1924 | Normal, IL (Gymnasium) | Illinois State | 23–20 |
| 36 | January 9, 1926 | Peoria, IL (Illinois National Guard Armory) | Bradley | 34–20 |
| 37 | February 6, 1926 | Normal, IL (McCormick Gymnasium) | Bradley | 38–25 |
| 38 | December 14, 1927 | Peoria, IL (Illinois National Guard Armory) | Bradley | 47–16 |
| 39 | March 3, 1928 | Normal, IL (McCormick Gymnasium) | Bradley | 42–26 |
| 40 | December 1, 1953 | Peoria, IL (Robertson Memorial Field House) | Bradley | 91–75 |
| 41 | December 3, 1957 | Peoria, IL (Robertson Memorial Field House) | Bradley | 97–47 |
| 42 | January 9, 1975 | Peoria, IL (Robertson Memorial Field House) | Bradley | 106–85 |
| 43 | December 20, 1975 | Peoria, IL (Robertson Memorial Field House) | Illinois State | 88–83 |
| 44 | January 3, 1977 | Normal, IL (Horton Field House) | Illinois State | 89–66 |
| 45 | January 2, 1978 | Peoria, IL (Robertson Memorial Field House) | Illinois State | 84–83 |
| 46 | January 3, 1979 | Normal, IL (Horton Field House) | Illinois State | 74–61 |
| 47 | January 3, 1980 | Peoria, IL (Robertson Memorial Field House) | Bradley | 62–57 |
| 48 | December 4, 1980 | Normal, IL (Horton Field House) | Bradley | 72–70 |
| 49 | January 28, 1982 | Peoria, IL (Robertson Memorial Field House) | Bradley | 72–58 |
| 50 | February 13, 1982 | Normal, IL (Horton Field House) | Bradley | 48–47 |
| 51 | March 4, 1982 | Peoria, IL (Robertson Memorial Field House) | Illinois State | 55–50 ^{2OT} |
| 52 | January 13, 1983 | Normal, IL (Horton Field House) | Illinois State | 77–69 |
| 53 | January 31, 1983 | Peoria, IL (Carver Arena) | Illinois State | 56–55 |
| 54 | March 10, 1983 | Normal, IL (Horton Field House) | Illinois State | 79–61 |
| 55 | February 18, 1984 | Peoria, IL (Carver Arena) | Illinois State | 56–50 |
| 56 | March 1, 1984 | Normal, IL (Horton Field House) | Illinois State | 55–46 |
| 57 | January 26, 1985 | Normal, IL (Horton Field House) | Illinois State | 65–55 |
| 58 | March 2, 1985 | Peoria, IL (Carver Arena) | Bradley | 82–69 |
| 59 | January 23, 1986 | Peoria, IL (Carver Arena) | Bradley | 67–63 ^{OT} |
| 60 | February 10, 1986 | Normal, IL (Horton Field House) | Bradley | 74–67 |
| 61 | March 4, 1986 | Tulsa, OK (Tulsa Convention Center) | Bradley | 65–64 |
| 62 | January 19, 1987 | Normal, IL (Horton Field House) | Bradley | 73–65 |
| 63 | February 18, 1987 | Peoria, IL (Carver Arena) | Bradley | 93–81 |
| 64 | January 4, 1988 | Peoria, IL (Carver Arena) | Illinois State | 85–74 |
| 65 | February 20, 1988 | Normal, IL (Horton Field House) | Bradley | 78–71 ^{OT} |
| 66 | March 8, 1988 | Peoria, IL (Carver Arena) | Bradley | 83–59 |
| 67 | January 15, 1989 | Normal, IL (Redbird Arena) | Illinois State | 91–83 |
| 68 | February 20, 1989 | Peoria, IL (Carver Arena) | Bradley | 78–66 |
| 69 | January 25, 1990 | Peoria, IL (Carver Arena) | Illinois State | 74–72 |
| 70 | February 17, 1990 | Normal, IL (Redbird Arena) | Illinois State | 81–68 |
| 71 | December 20, 1990 | Normal, IL (Redbird Arena) | Bradley | 74–54 |
| 72 | February 21, 1991 | Peoria, IL (Carver Arena) | Bradley | 67–63 |
| 73 | February 15, 1992 | Normal, IL (Redbird Arena) | Illinois State | 58–46 |

| No. | Date | Location | Winner | Score |
|---|---|---|---|---|
| 74 | February 25, 1992 | Peoria, IL (Carver Arena) | Illinois State | 64–60 |
| 75 | January 23, 1993 | Normal, IL (Redbird Arena) | Illinois State | 70–68 ^{OT} |
| 76 | February 23, 1993 | Peoria, IL (Carver Arena) | Bradley | 55–41 |
| 77 | January 19, 1994 | Peoria, IL (Carver Arena) | Bradley | 81–79 |
| 78 | February 2, 1994 | Normal, IL (Redbird Arena) | Illinois State | 68–57 |
| 79 | January 25, 1995 | Peoria, IL (Carver Arena) | Bradley | 86–83 |
| 80 | February 11, 1995 | Normal, IL (Redbird Arena) | Illinois State | 70–59 |
| 81 | January 20, 1996 | Normal, IL (Redbird Arena) | Illinois State | 77–72 |
| 82 | February 24, 1996 | Peoria, IL (Carver Arena) | Bradley | 65–64 |
| 83 | February 1, 1997 | Normal, IL (Redbird Arena) | Illinois State | 69–67 |
| 84 | February 22, 1997 | Peoria, IL (Carver Arena) | Bradley | 69–64 |
| 85 | January 21, 1998 | Peoria, IL (Carver Arena) | Illinois State | 57–54 |
| 86 | February 4, 1998 | Normal, IL (Redbird Arena) | Illinois State | 76–70 |
| 87 | January 20, 1999 | Normal, IL (Redbird Arena) | Bradley | 69–68 |
| 88 | February 10, 1999 | Peoria, IL (Carver Arena) | Bradley | 74–70 ^{OT} |
| 89 | January 26, 2000 | Peoria, IL (Carver Arena) | Bradley | 71–68 ^{OT} |
| 90 | February 8, 2000 | Normal, IL (Redbird Arena) | Illinois State | 75–74 ^{OT} |
| 91 | February 6, 2001 | Normal, IL (Redbird Arena) | Illinois State | 81–62 |
| 92 | February 21, 2001 | Peoria, IL (Carver Arena) | Bradley | 64–52 |
| 93 | March 4, 2001 | St. Louis, MO (Savvis Center) | Bradley | 73–66 |
| 94 | January 23, 2002 | Peoria, IL (Carver Arena) | Illinois State | 58–55 |
| 95 | February 5, 2002 | Normal, IL (Redbird Arena) | Illinois State | 60–51 |
| 96 | February 1, 2003 | Normal, IL (Redbird Arena) | Illinois State | 89–74 |
| 97 | February 12, 2003 | Peoria, IL (Carver Arena) | Bradley | 88–76 |
| 98 | January 31, 2004 | Normal, IL (Redbird Arena) | Bradley | 57–54 |
| 99 | February 18, 2004 | Peoria, IL (Carver Arena) | Bradley | 65–46 |
| 100 | March 5, 2004 | St. Louis, MO (Savvis Center) | Illinois State | 76–56 |
| 101 | February 5, 2005 | Normal, IL (Redbird Arena) | Illinois State | 69–62 |
| 102 | February 23, 2005 | Peoria, IL (Carver Arena) | Bradley | 77–61 |
| 103 | February 1, 2006 | Peoria, IL (Carver Arena) | Bradley | 73–44 |
| 104 | February 11, 2006 | Normal, IL (Redbird Arena) | Bradley | 71–59 |
| 105 | January 24, 2007 | Peoria, IL (Carver Arena) | Bradley | 88–67 |
| 106 | February 3, 2007 | Normal, IL (Redbird Arena) | Bradley | 70–62 |
| 107 | January 23, 2008 | Peoria, IL (Carver Arena) | Bradley | 76–75 |
| 108 | February 9, 2008 | Normal, IL (Redbird Arena) | Illinois State | 72–68 |
| 109 | January 6, 2009 | Peoria, IL (Carver Arena) | Bradley | 56–52 |
| 110 | January 31, 2009 | Normal, IL (Redbird Arena) | Illinois State | 69–65 |
| 111 | January 30, 2010 | Normal, IL (Redbird Arena) | Illinois State | 66–47 |
| 112 | February 9, 2010 | Peoria, IL (Carver Arena) | Illinois State | 62–61 |
| 113 | January 26, 2011 | Peoria, IL (Carver Arena) | Illinois State | 79–78 ^{OT} |
| 114 | February 22, 2011 | Normal, IL (Redbird Arena) | Illinois State | 51–50 |
| 115 | February 4, 2012 | Normal, IL (Redbird Arena) | Illinois State | 78–48 |
| 116 | February 25, 2012 | Peoria, IL (Carver Arena) | Illinois State | 54–53 |
| 117 | January 29, 2013 | Peoria, IL (Carver Arena) | Bradley | 83–77 |
| 118 | February 13, 2013 | Normal, IL (Redbird Arena) | Illinois State | 79–59 |
| 119 | January 29, 2014 | Peoria, IL (Carver Arena) | Bradley | 64–45 |
| 120 | February 15, 2014 | Normal, IL (Redbird Arena) | Illinois State | 70–54 |
| 121 | January 17, 2015 | Normal, IL (Redbird Arena) | Illinois State | 82–72 |
| 122 | February 18, 2015 | Peoria, IL (Carver Arena) | Illinois State | 60–47 |
| 123 | January 20, 2016 | Peoria, IL (Carver Arena) | Illinois State | 55–52 |
| 124 | February 14, 2016 | Normal, IL (Redbird Arena) | Illinois State | 75–60 |
| 125 | January 18, 2017 | Peoria, IL (Carver Arena) | Illinois State | 69–49 |
| 126 | February 11, 2017 | Normal, IL (Redbird Arena) | Illinois State | 64–50 |
| 127 | January 17, 2018 | Normal, IL (Redbird Arena) | Illinois State | 70–57 |
| 128 | February 14, 2018 | Peoria, IL (Carver Arena) | Bradley | 70–58 |
| 129 | January 23, 2019 | Peoria, IL (Carver Arena) | Bradley | 85–68 |
| 130 | February 16, 2019 | Normal, IL (Redbird Arena) | Bradley | 65–59 |
| 131 | January 22, 2020 | Peoria, IL (Carver Arena) | Bradley | 75–63 |
| 132 | February 26, 2020 | Normal, IL (Redbird Arena) | Bradley | 74–71 ^{OT} |
| 133 | January 20, 2021 | Normal, IL (Redbird Arena) | Illinois State | 71–56 |
| 134 | February 18, 2021 | Peoria, IL (Carver Arena) | Illinois State | 88–71 |
| 135 | January 16, 2022 | Normal, IL (Redbird Arena) | Illinois State | 74–65 |
| 136 | February 19, 2022 | Peoria, IL (Carver Arena) | Bradley | 72–64 |
| 137 | January 25, 2023 | Peoria, IL (Carver Arena) | Bradley | 79–75 ^{OT} |
| 138 | February 8, 2023 | Normal, IL (Redbird Arena) | Bradley | 79–61 |
| 139 | February 3, 2024 | Normal, IL (CEFCU Arena) | Bradley | 73–60 |
| 140 | February 24, 2024 | Peoria, IL (Carver Arena) | Bradley | 48–45 |
| 141 | January 25, 2025 | Peoria, IL (Carver Arena) | Bradley | 61–57 |
| 142 | February 19, 2025 | Normal, IL (CEFCU Arena) | Illinois State | 82–71 |
| 143 | January 17, 2026 | Normal, IL (CEFCU Arena) | Illinois State | 88–62 |
| 144 | February 21, 2026 | Peoria, IL (Carver Arena) | Bradley | 74–60 |
Series: Bradley leads 77–67

NOTE: information based on Illinois State history; Bradley history discrepancies are noted below.
• January 25, 1905 game listed as February 4, 1905 in Normal, IL.
• February 1, 1907 game listed as January 25, 1907.
• January 10, 1908 game listed as January 6, 1908.
• January 22, 1910 game is not listed.
• January 18, 1911 game listed as January 4, 1911 with score of 27-17.
• March 10, 1911 game is not listed.
• February 16, 1912 game score of 21-19.
• January 23, 1913 game listed as January 11, 1913.
• February 19, 1913 game listed as January 12, 1913.
• February 28, 1914 game listed in Peoria, IL.
• February 18, 1916 game listed in unknown.
• March 4, 1916 game is not listed.
• February 3, 1917 game listed as January 9, 1917 in Normal, IL.
• March 1, 1917 game listed as January 15, 1917.
• February 15, 1918 game listed as January 10, 1918.
• March 1, 1918 game listed as January 13, 1918.
• February 2, 1921 game listed in Normal, IL.
• February 2, 1922 game listed as February 1, 1922.

== Women's basketball ==
The Redbirds and Braves first played in women's basketball in 1976.

They have combined for eight Missouri Valley Conference regular season championships (Illinois State 8 (six outright), Bradley 0) and six tournament championships (Illinois State 5, Bradley 1).

They have also combined for twenty-seven postseason tournament appearances (Illinois State 25 (three Association for Intercollegiate Athletics for Women (AIAW) Basketball Tournament, six National Collegiate Athletic Association (NCAA) Division I Women's Tournament, sixteen Women's National Invitation Tournament (WNIT)), Bradley 2 (one NCAA, one WNIT)).

NOTE: championship/postseason information as of conclusion for 2024-25 season.

| Illinois State victories | Bradley victories | Ties |

| No. | Date | Location | Winner | Score |
|---|---|---|---|---|
| 1 | February 3, 1976 | Normal, IL (Horton Field House) | Illinois State | 62–29 |
| 2 | February 19, 1976 | Peoria, IL (Robertson Field House) | Illinois State | 52–39 |
| 3 | December 8, 1976 | Peoria, IL (Robertson Field House) | Bradley | 47–30 |
| 4 | February 15, 1977 | Normal, IL (Horton Field House) | Illinois State | 66–39 |
| 5 | January 21, 1978 | Normal, IL (Horton Field House) | Illinois State | 56–44 |
| 6 | February 21, 1978 | Peoria, IL (Robertson Field House) | Illinois State | 63–56 |
| 7 | January 31, 1979 | Peoria, IL (Robertson Field House) | Bradley | 63–48 |
| 8 | February 21, 1979 | Normal, IL (Horton Field House) | Bradley | 50–31 |
| 9 | December 5, 1979 | Peoria, IL (Robertson Field House) | Bradley | 73–55 |
| 10 | January 12, 1980 | Normal, IL (Horton Field House) | Bradley | 69–63 |
| 11 | January 10, 1981 | Normal, IL (Horton Field House) | Bradley | 66–58 |
| 12 | January 28, 1984 | Normal, IL (Horton Field House) | Illinois State | 102–52 |
| 13 | February 23, 1984 | Peoria, IL (Robertson Field House) | Illinois State | 99–71 |
| 14 | January 24, 1985 | Peoria, IL (Robertson Field House) | Illinois State | 93–62 |
| 15 | February 23, 1985 | Normal, IL (Horton Field House) | Illinois State | 63–50 |
| 16 | January 29, 1986 | Normal, IL (Horton Field House) | Illinois State | 75–68 |
| 17 | March 1, 1986 | Peoria, IL (Robertson Field House) | Illinois State | 102–95 ^{2OT} |
| 18 | December 28, 1986 | Peoria, IL (Robertson Field House) | Bradley | 82–74 |
| 19 | February 27, 1987 | Normal, IL (Horton Field House) | Bradley | 80–76 |
| 20 | December 30, 1987 | Normal, IL (Horton Field House) | Illinois State | 83–70 |
| 21 | February 24, 1988 | Peoria, IL (Robertson Field House) | Bradley | 85–79 |
| 22 | January 21, 1989 | Normal, IL (Redbird Arena) | Illinois State | 88–56 |
| 23 | February 16, 1989 | Peoria, IL (Robertson Field House) | Illinois State | 71–55 |
| 24 | January 17, 1990 | Peoria, IL (Robertson Field House) | Bradley | 68–66 |
| 25 | February 17, 1990 | Normal, IL (Redbird Arena) | Illinois State | 80–59 |
| 26 | January 23, 1991 | Normal, IL (Redbird Arena) | Illinois State | 71–65 |
| 27 | February 24, 1991 | Peoria, IL (Robertson Field House) | Illinois State | 83–59 |
| 28 | January 3, 1992 | Peoria, IL (Robertson Field House) | Illinois State | 81–69 |
| 29 | March 8, 1992 | Normal, IL (Redbird Arena) | Bradley | 59–54 |
| 30 | January 23, 1993 | Peoria, IL (Robertson Field House) | Illinois State | 83–68 |
| 31 | February 3, 1993 | Normal, IL (Redbird Arena) | Bradley | 77–66 |
| 32 | January 24, 1994 | Normal, IL (Redbird Arena) | Bradley | 69–57 |
| 33 | February 21, 1994 | Peoria, IL (Robertson Field House) | Illinois State | 93–78 |
| 34 | January 28, 1995 | Peoria, IL (Robertson Field House) | Illinois State | 73–69 |
| 35 | February 23, 1995 | Normal, IL (Redbird Arena) | Bradley | 75–47 |
| 36 | January 2, 1996 | Normal, IL (Redbird Arena) | Illinois State | 80–75 |
| 37 | March 2, 1996 | Peoria, IL (Robertson Field House) | Illinois State | 83–71 |
| 38 | March 7, 1996 | Des Moines, IA (The Knapp Center) | Illinois State | 80–75 ^{OT} |
| 39 | January 23, 1997 | Normal, IL (Redbird Arena) | Illinois State | 80–66 |
| 40 | February 20, 1997 | Peoria, IL (Robertson Field House) | Bradley | 61–58 |
| 41 | January 9, 1998 | Normal, IL (Redbird Arena) | Illinois State | 78–54 |
| 42 | February 7, 1998 | Peoria, IL (Robertson Field House) | Illinois State | 83–80 ^{2OT} |
| 43 | December 28, 1998 | Peoria, IL (Robertson Field House) | Illinois State | 95–93 ^{OT} |
| 44 | February 23, 1999 | Normal, IL (Redbird Arena) | Illinois State | 70–62 |
| 45 | January 16, 2000 | Peoria, IL (Robertson Field House) | Illinois State | 80–67 |
| 46 | February 12, 2000 | Normal, IL (Redbird Arena) | Bradley | 61–60 |
| 47 | December 30, 2000 | Normal, IL (Redbird Arena) | Illinois State | 79–60 |
| 48 | March 1, 2001 | Peoria, IL (Robertson Field House) | Bradley | 83–54 |
| 49 | January 6, 2002 | Peoria, IL (Robertson Field House) | Bradley | 71–36 |
| 50 | February 3, 2002 | Normal, IL (Redbird Arena) | Illinois State | 70–62 |
| 51 | January 11, 2003 | Peoria, IL (Robertson Field House) | Bradley | 63–59 |

| No. | Date | Location | Winner | Score |
|---|---|---|---|---|
| 52 | February 9, 2003 | Normal, IL (Redbird Arena) | Bradley | 70–54 |
| 53 | January 4, 2004 | Normal, IL (Redbird Arena) | Illinois State | 79–78 ^{OT} |
| 54 | March 4, 2004 | Peoria, IL (Robertson Field House) | Bradley | 87–71 |
| 55 | January 21, 2005 | Peoria, IL (Robertson Field House) | Bradley | 57–55 |
| 56 | February 20, 2005 | Normal, IL (Redbird Arena) | Illinois State | 69–67 |
| 57 | January 15, 2006 | Peoria, IL (Robertson Field House) | Bradley | 71–63 |
| 58 | February 12, 2006 | Normal, IL (Redbird Arena) | Illinois State | 66–51 |
| 59 | January 28, 2007 | Normal, IL (Redbird Arena) | Illinois State | 55–47 |
| 60 | February 23, 2007 | Peoria, IL (Robertson Field House) | Illinois State | 75–66 |
| 61 | March 9, 2007 | Des Moines, IA (The Knapp Center) | Illinois State | 75–60 |
| 62 | January 13, 2008 | Peoria, IL (Robertson Field House) | Illinois State | 94–61 |
| 63 | February 10, 2008 | Normal, IL (Redbird Arena) | Illinois State | 79–46 |
| 64 | January 30, 2009 | East Peoria, IL (Lorene Ramsey Gymnasium) | Illinois State | 74–58 |
| 65 | February 26, 2009 | Normal, IL (Redbird Arena) | Illinois State | 82–61 |
| 66 | January 31, 2010 | East Peoria, IL (Lorene Ramsey Gymnasium) | Illinois State | 68–53 |
| 67 | February 25, 2010 | Normal, IL (Redbird Arena) | Illinois State | 71–58 |
| 68 | December 30, 2010 | Normal, IL (Redbird Arena) | Illinois State | 83–69 |
| 69 | March 3, 2011 | Peoria, IL (Renaissance Coliseum) | Illinois State | 71–63 |
| 70 | January 12, 2012 | Peoria, IL (Renaissance Coliseum) | Illinois State | 67–65 |
| 71 | February 12, 2012 | Normal, IL (Redbird Arena) | Illinois State | 82–63 |
| 72 | January 6, 2013 | Normal, IL (Redbird Arena) | Illinois State | 81–65 |
| 73 | March 7, 2013 | Peoria, IL (Renaissance Coliseum) | Bradley | 71–69 |
| 74 | March 15, 2013 | St. Charles, MO (Family Arena) | Illinois State | 59–48 |
| 75 | February 2, 2014 | Peoria, IL (Renaissance Coliseum) | Bradley | 64–62 |
| 76 | February 27, 2014 | Normal, IL (Redbird Arena) | Bradley | 59–58 |
| 77 | January 30, 2015 | Normal, IL (Redbird Arena) | Bradley | 58–55 |
| 78 | March 1, 2015 | Peoria, IL (Renaissance Coliseum) | Bradley | 60–50 |
| 79 | January 22, 2016 | Normal, IL (Redbird Arena) | Illinois State | 54–49 |
| 80 | February 21, 2016 | Peoria, IL (Renaissance Coliseum) | Bradley | 52–38 |
| 81 | January 1, 2017 | Normal, IL (Redbird Arena) | Illinois State | 71–63 |
| 82 | March 4, 2017 | Peoria, IL (Renaissance Coliseum) | Bradley | 70–59 |
| 83 | December 31, 2017 | Normal, IL (Redbird Arena) | Bradley | 62–42 |
| 84 | March 3, 2018 | Peoria, IL (Renaissance Coliseum) | Illinois State | 53–41 |
| 85 | January 26, 2019 | Normal, IL (Redbird Arena) | Bradley | 79–68 |
| 86 | February 22, 2019 | Peoria, IL (Renaissance Coliseum) | Bradley | 75–65 |
| 87 | March 15, 2019 | Moline, IL (TaxSlayer Center) | Illinois State | 61–55 |
| 88 | January 10, 2020 | Peoria, IL (Renaissance Coliseum) | Bradley | 76–61 |
| 89 | February 7, 2020 | Normal, IL (Redbird Arena) | Bradley | 66–62 |
| 90 | January 27, 2021 | Normal, IL (Redbird Arena) | Illinois State | 66–54 |
| 91 | February 25, 2021 | Peoria, IL (Renaissance Coliseum) | Illinois State | 79–59 |
| 92 | January 1, 2022 | Normal, IL (Redbird Arena) | Illinois State | 64–57 |
| 93 | March 5, 2022 | Peoria, IL (Renaissance Coliseum) | Illinois State | 62–53 |
| 94 | January 12, 2023 | Peoria, IL (Renaissance Coliseum) | Illinois State | 60–50 |
| 95 | February 2, 2023 | Normal, IL (Redbird Arena) | Illinois State | 84–52 |
| 96 | December 30, 2023 | Normal, IL (CEFCU Arena) | Illinois State | 78–74 |
| 97 | February 22, 2024 | Peoria, IL (Renaissance Coliseum) | Illinois State | 68–50 |
| 98 | January 26, 2025 | Normal, IL (CEFCU Arena) | Illinois State | 74–58 |
| 99 | February 23, 2025 | Peoria, IL (Renaissance Coliseum) | Bradley | 70–65 |
| 100 | February 1, 2026 | Normal, IL (CEFCU Arena) | Illinois State | 58–54 |
| 101 | March 8, 2026 | Peoria, IL (Renaissance Coliseum) | Illinois State | 66–65 |
Series: Illinois State leads 65–36

== Football ==
The Redbirds and Braves first played in football in 1905.

The series was suspended after the 1970 season when Bradley halted sponsoring football.

| Illinois State victories | Bradley victories | Ties |

| No. | Date | Location | Winner | Score |
|---|---|---|---|---|
| 1 | October 28, 1905 | Peoria, IL (Peoria Stadium) | Illinois State | 29–0 |
| 2 | November 17, 1906 | Normal, IL | Illinois State | 23–0 |
| 3 | November 2, 1907 | Normal, IL | Tie | 0–0 |
| 4 | October 30, 1908 | Normal, IL | Illinois State | 24–6 |
| 5 | October 16, 1909 | Bloomington, IL | Illinois State | 5–0 |
| 6 | October 26, 1912 | Peoria, IL (Peoria Stadium) | Tie | 0–0 |
| 7 | October 11, 1913 | Peoria, IL (Peoria Stadium) | Bradley | 19–7 |
| 8 | October 30, 1914 | Normal, IL | Bradley | 14–7 |
| 9 | October 30, 1915 | Normal, IL | Bradley | 7–0 |
| 10 | October 28, 1916 | Normal, IL | Illinois State | 16–6 |
| 11 | November 3, 1917 | Peoria, IL (Peoria Stadium) | Bradley | 30–9 |
| 12 | November 1, 1919 | Normal, IL | Bradley | 49–0 |
| 13 | October 30, 1920 | Peoria, IL (Peoria Stadium) | Bradley | 10–0 |
| 14 | October 29, 1921 | Normal, IL | Bradley | 14–0 |

| No. | Date | Location | Winner | Score |
|---|---|---|---|---|
| 15 | October 28, 1922 | Peoria, IL (Peoria Stadium) | Bradley | 20–3 |
| 16 | October 5, 1924 | Peoria, IL (Peoria Stadium) | Bradley | 24–0 |
| 17 | September 26, 1953 | Peoria, IL (Peoria Stadium) | Bradley | 13–0 |
| 18 | September 24, 1954 | Normal, IL | Bradley | 34–13 |
| 19 | September 23, 1955 | Peoria, IL (Peoria Stadium) | Bradley | 18–7 |
| 20 | September 22, 1956 | Normal, IL | Tie | 7–7 |
| 21 | November 2, 1963 | Peoria, IL (Peoria Stadium) | Bradley | 29–22 |
| 22 | October 3, 1964 | Normal, IL (Hancock Stadium) | Bradley | 25–24 |
| 23 | October 30, 1965 | Peoria, IL (Peoria Stadium) | Bradley | 29–12 |
| 24 | November 18, 1967 | Peoria, IL (Peoria Stadium) | Bradley | 14–0 |
| 25 | November 16, 1968 | Normal, IL (Hancock Stadium) | Illinois State | 42–26 |
| 26 | November 15, 1969 | Normal, IL (Hancock Stadium) | Illinois State | 27–7 |
| 27 | November 14, 1970 | Normal, IL (Hancock Stadium) | Illinois State | 17–7 |
Series: Bradley leads 16–8–3

== Men's golf ==
The Redbirds and Braves have combined for seven Missouri Valley Conference tournament championships (Illinois State 6, Bradley 1).

== Women's golf ==
The Redbirds and Braves have combined for nineteen Missouri Valley Conference tournament championships (Illinois State 15, Bradley 4).

== Women's gymnastics ==
The Redbirds have three Midwest Independent Conference tournament championships.

== Men's soccer ==
The Redbirds and Braves first played in men's soccer in 1987.

They have combined for four Missouri Valley Conference regular season championships (Illinois State 0, Bradley 4 (two outright)) and three tournament championships (Illinois State 0, Bradley 3).

They have also combined for seven tournament appearances (Illinois State 0, Bradley 7 (seven National Collegiate Athletic Association (NCAA) Division I Tournament)).

The series was suspended after the 1994 season when Illinois State halted sponsoring men's soccer.

| Illinois State victories | Bradley victories | Ties |

| No. | Date | Location | Winner | Score |
|---|---|---|---|---|
| 1 | October 18, 1987 | Normal, IL (Adelaide Street Field) | Illinois State | 5–0 |
| 2 | October 15, 1988 | Peoria, IL | Illinois State | 3–0 |
| 3 | November 1, 1989 | Normal, IL (Adelaide Street Field) | Illinois State | 6–2 |
| 4 | October 28, 1990 | Peoria, IL (Becker Park) | Illinois State | 4–2 |
| 5 | October 27, 1991 | Normal, IL (Adelaide Street Field) | Illinois State | 5–1 |
| 6 | November 8, 1991 | Tulsa, OK (H. A. Chapman Stadium) | Illinois State | 3–1 |

| No. | Date | Location | Winner | Score |
|---|---|---|---|---|
| 7 | October 14, 1992 | Peoria, IL (Becker Park) | Illinois State | 5–3 |
| 8 | November 7, 1992 | Omaha, NE (Tranquility Park) | Illinois State | 2–0 |
| 9 | October 24, 1993 | Normal, IL (Adelaide Street Field) | Illinois State | 3–2 |
| 10 | October 14, 1994 | Peoria, IL (Becker Park) | Illinois State | 3–0 |
Series: Illinois State leads 10–0

== Women's soccer ==
The Redbirds have eleven Missouri Valley Conference regular season championships and seven tournament championships.

The Redbirds also have seven postseason tournament appearances (seven National Collegiate Athletic Association (NCAA) Division I Tournament).

== Softball ==
The Redbirds and Braves first played in softball in 1983.

They have combined for fourteen Missouri Valley Conference regular season championships (Illinois State 14 (twelve outright), Bradley 0) and eight tournament championships (Illinois State 6, Bradley 2).

They have also combined for nineteen postseason tournament appearances (Illinois State 17 (eight Association for Intercollegiate Athletics for Women (AIAW) College World Series, nine National Collegiate Athletic Association (NCAA) Division I Tournament), Bradley 2 (two NCAA)).

NOTE: championship/postseason information as of conclusion for 2024-25 season.

| Illinois State victories | Bradley victories | Ties |

| No. | Date | Location | Winner | Score |
|---|---|---|---|---|
| 1 | May 6, 1983 | Macomb, IL | Illinois State | 1–0 |
| 2 | March 23, 1984 | Bloomington, IN | Bradley | 3–2 |
| 3 | April 19, 1984 | East Peoria, IL | Bradley | 2–0 |
| 4 | April 19, 1984 | East Peoria, IL | Illinois State | 3–1 |
| 5 | May 3, 1984 | Springfield, MO | Bradley | 3–2 |
| 6 | April 13, 1985 | Normal, IL | Bradley | 2–0 |
| 7 | April 13, 1985 | Normal, IL | Illinois State | 4–1 |
| 8 | May 9, 1985 | Macomb, IL | Illinois State | 2–0 |
| 9 | May 9, 1985 | Macomb, IL | Illinois State | 6–0 |
| 10 | April 9, 1986 | East Peoria, IL | Illinois State | 1–0 |
| 11 | April 9, 1986 | East Peoria, IL | Bradley | 2–1 |
| 12 | March 28, 1987 | Normal, IL | Illinois State | 10–0 |
| 13 | April 20, 1987 | Normal, IL | Bradley | 2–0 |
| 14 | April 20, 1987 | Normal, IL | Bradley | 2–1 |
| 15 | May 4, 1988 | Peoria, IL | Illinois State | 3–1 |
| 16 | May 4, 1988 | Peoria, IL | Illinois State | 5–0 |
| 17 | April 29, 1989 | Normal, IL | Illinois State | 5–2 |
| 18 | April 29, 1989 | Normal, IL | Illinois State | 4–2 |
| 19 | April 10, 1991 | Normal, IL | Illinois State | 7–0 |
| 20 | April 10, 1991 | Normal, IL | Illinois State | 11–3 |
| 21 | May 9, 1991 | Wichita, KS (WSU Softball Diamond) | Illinois State | 6–1 |
| 22 | May 2, 1992 | Peoria, IL | Bradley | 2–0 |
| 23 | May 2, 1992 | Peoria, IL | Illinois State | 11–0 |
| 24 | May 7, 1993 | Peoria, IL | Illinois State | 2–0 |
| 25 | May 7, 1993 | Peoria, IL | Illinois State | 2–0 |
| 26 | April 2, 1994 | Normal, IL | Illinois State | 5–0 |
| 27 | April 2, 1994 | Normal, IL | Bradley | 5–3 |
| 28 | May 12, 1994 | Springfield, MO | Illinois State | 4–3 |
| 29 | May 5, 1995 | Peoria, IL (Laura Bradley Park) | Illinois State | 4–0 |
| 30 | May 5, 1995 | Peoria, IL (Laura Bradley Park) | Bradley | 6–5 |
| 31 | May 10, 1995 | Terre Haute, IN (Price Field) | Illinois State | 11–3 |
| 32 | March 30, 1996 | Terre Haute, IN (Price Field) | Illinois State | 8–0 |
| 33 | April 26, 1996 | Normal, IL | Illinois State | 10–6 |
| 34 | April 26, 1996 | Normal, IL | Illinois State | 6–2 |
| 35 | May 11, 1996 | Normal, IL | Bradley | 5–4 |
| 36 | April 26, 1997 | Peoria, IL (Laura Bradley Park) | Illinois State | 8–0 |
| 37 | April 26, 1997 | Peoria, IL (Laura Bradley Park) | Illinois State | 8–0 |
| 38 | May 8, 1997 | Cedar Falls, IA (Panther Park) | Illinois State | 4–3 |
| 39 | April 26, 1998 | Normal, IL | Illinois State | 9–1 |
| 40 | April 26, 1998 | Normal, IL | Illinois State | 3–2 |
| 41 | April 11, 1999 | Peoria, IL (Laura Bradley Park) | Bradley | 3–2 |
| 42 | April 11, 1999 | Peoria, IL (Laura Bradley Park) | Illinois State | 11–7 |
| 43 | April 29, 2000 | Normal, IL (Redbird Softball Complex) | Illinois State | 6–1 |
| 44 | April 29, 2000 | Normal, IL (Redbird Softball Complex) | Illinois State | 3–0 |
| 45 | March 23, 2002 | Peoria, IL (Laura Bradley Park) | Illinois State | 6–0 |
| 46 | March 23, 2002 | Peoria, IL (Laura Bradley Park) | Illinois State | 4–1 |
| 47 | April 5, 2003 | Normal, IL (Redbird Softball Complex) | Illinois State | 1–0 |
| 48 | April 5, 2003 | Normal, IL (Redbird Softball Complex) | Bradley | 1–0 |
| 49 | March 27, 2004 | Peoria, IL (Laura Bradley Park) | Illinois State | 9–0 |
| 50 | March 27, 2004 | Peoria, IL (Laura Bradley Park) | Bradley | 2–0 |
| 51 | March 28, 2004 | Peoria, IL (Laura Bradley Park) | Illinois State | 6–0 |
| 52 | March 19, 2005 | Normal, IL (Redbird Softball Complex) | Illinois State | 8–0 |
| 53 | March 20, 2005 | Normal, IL (Redbird Softball Complex) | Illinois State | 2–0 |
| 54 | March 20, 2005 | Normal, IL (Redbird Softball Complex) | Illinois State | 8–0 |
| 55 | March 25, 2006 | Peoria, IL (Laura Bradley Park) | Illinois State | 9–3 |
| 56 | March 25, 2006 | Peoria, IL (Laura Bradley Park) | Illinois State | 3–2 |
| 57 | March 26, 2006 | Peoria, IL (Laura Bradley Park) | Bradley | 2–0 |
| 58 | March 10, 2007 | Cape Girardeau, MO (Southeast Softball Complex) | Illinois State | 8–0 |

| No. | Date | Location | Winner | Score |
|---|---|---|---|---|
| 59 | April 9, 2007 | Normal, IL (Redbird Softball Complex) | Illinois State | 3–2 |
| 60 | April 9, 2007 | Normal, IL (Redbird Softball Complex) | Illinois State | 8–1 |
| 61 | April 14, 2008 | East Peoria, IL (EastSide Centre) | Illinois State | 5–3 |
| 62 | April 14, 2008 | East Peoria, IL (EastSide Centre) | Illinois State | 8–7 |
| 63 | March 14, 2009 | Peoria, IL (Laura Bradley Park) | Illinois State | 2–1 |
| 64 | March 15, 2009 | Peoria, IL (Laura Bradley Park) | Illinois State | 5–2 |
| 65 | March 15, 2009 | Peoria, IL (Laura Bradley Park) | Bradley | 2–0 ^{8 Inn} |
| 66 | May 8, 2010 | Peoria, IL (Laura Bradley Park) | Illinois State | 2–0 |
| 67 | May 8, 2010 | Peoria, IL (Laura Bradley Park) | Illinois State | 7–0 |
| 68 | May 9, 2010 | Peoria, IL (Laura Bradley Park) | Illinois State | 6–0 |
| 69 | March 19, 2011 | Normal, IL (Marian Kneer Stadium) | Illinois State | 3–2 |
| 70 | March 19, 2011 | Normal, IL (Marian Kneer Stadium) | Illinois State | 3–1 |
| 71 | April 5, 2011 | Normal, IL (Marian Kneer Stadium) | Illinois State | 3–2 |
| 72 | April 21, 2012 | Peoria, IL (Laura Bradley Park) | Illinois State | 4–1 |
| 73 | April 21, 2012 | Peoria, IL (Laura Bradley Park) | Illinois State | 9–4 |
| 74 | April 22, 2012 | Peoria, IL (Laura Bradley Park) | Illinois State | 5–3 ^{10 Inn} |
| 75 | April 11, 2013 | Normal, IL (Marian Kneer Stadium) | Illinois State | 5–0 |
| 76 | April 11, 2013 | Normal, IL (Marian Kneer Stadium) | Illinois State | 8–3 |
| 77 | April 16, 2014 | Peoria, IL (Laura Bradley Park) | Bradley | 1–0 |
| 78 | April 16, 2014 | Peoria, IL (Laura Bradley Park) | Illinois State | 11–2 |
| 79 | April 22, 2014 | Normal, IL (Marian Kneer Stadium) | Illinois State | 6–3 |
| 80 | April 15, 2015 | Normal, IL (Marian Kneer Stadium) | Illinois State | 2–1 |
| 81 | April 15, 2015 | Normal, IL (Marian Kneer Stadium) | Illinois State | 10–2 ^{5 Inn} |
| 82 | April 22, 2015 | Peoria, IL (Laura Bradley Park) | Bradley | 8–7 |
| 83 | May 7, 2015 | Wichita, KS (Wilkins Stadium) | Illinois State | 11–7 |
| 84 | April 21, 2016 | Peoria, IL (Laura Bradley Park) | Bradley | 5–3 |
| 85 | April 26, 2016 | Normal, IL (Marian Kneer Stadium) | Bradley | 4–1 |
| 86 | April 26, 2016 | Normal, IL (Marian Kneer Stadium) | Illinois State | 11–3 ^{6 Inn} |
| 87 | April 19, 2017 | Normal, IL (Marian Kneer Stadium) | Illinois State | 6–5 |
| 88 | April 19, 2017 | Normal, IL (Marian Kneer Stadium) | Illinois State | 9–1 ^{5 Inn} |
| 89 | April 25, 2017 | Peoria, IL (Peterson Hotels Field) | Illinois State | 6–2 |
| 90 | April 19, 2018 | Peoria, IL (Peterson Hotels Field) | Bradley | 6–3 |
| 91 | April 19, 2018 | Peoria, IL (Peterson Hotels Field) | Illinois State | 3–2 |
| 92 | April 24, 2018 | Normal, IL (Marian Kneer Stadium) | Bradley | 6–5 |
| 93 | April 10, 2019 | Normal, IL (Marian Kneer Stadium) | Bradley | 8–4 |
| 94 | April 23, 2019 | Peoria, IL (Peterson Hotels Field) | Bradley | 9–1 ^{5 Inn} |
| 95 | April 23, 2019 | Peoria, IL (Peterson Hotels Field) | Illinois State | 8–1 |
| 96 | April 22, 2021 | Normal, IL (Marian Kneer Stadium) | Illinois State | 7–0 |
| 97 | April 22, 2021 | Normal, IL (Marian Kneer Stadium) | Illinois State | 8–0 ^{6 Inn} |
| 98 | April 27, 2021 | Peoria, IL (Peterson Hotels Field) | Bradley | 1–0 |
| 99 | April 19, 2022 | Peoria, IL (Peterson Hotels Field) | Illinois State | 6–1 |
| 100 | April 19, 2022 | Peoria, IL (Peterson Hotels Field) | Bradley | 4–3 |
| 101 | April 27, 2022 | Normal, IL (Marian Kneer Stadium) | Bradley | 5–2 |
| 102 | April 5, 2023 | Peoria, IL (OSF HealthCare Field) | Illinois State | 6–3 |
| 103 | April 5, 2023 | Peoria, IL (OSF HealthCare Field) | Illinois State | 3–0 |
| 104 | April 11, 2023 | Normal, IL (Marian Kneer Stadium) | Illinois State | 10–2 ^{5 Inn} |
| 105 | March 27, 2024 | Normal, IL (Marian Kneer Stadium) | Illinois State | 7–1 |
| 106 | March 27, 2024 | Normal, IL (Marian Kneer Stadium) | Illinois State | 5–4 |
| 107 | April 17, 2024 | Peoria, IL (OSF HealthCare Field) | Illinois State | 9–4 |
| 108 | May 9, 2024 | Normal, IL (Marian Kneer Stadium) | Illinois State | 3–2 |
| 109 | March 25, 2025 | Peoria, IL (OSF HealthCare Field) | Illinois State | 6–3 |
| 110 | April 1, 2025 | Peoria, IL (OSF HealthCare Field) | Illinois State | 1–0 |
| 111 | April 22, 2025 | Normal, IL (Marian Kneer Stadium) | Illinois State | 7–3 |
| 112 | May 1, 2026 | Peoria, IL (Peterson Hotels Field) | Bradley | 9–2 |
| 113 | May 1, 2026 | Peoria, IL (Peterson Hotels Field) | Illinois State | 9–2 |
| 114 | May 2, 2026 | Peoria, IL (Peterson Hotels Field) | Illinois State | 9–1 ^{5 Inn} |
Series: Illinois State leads 86–28

NOTE: information based on Bradley history; Illinois State history discrepancies are noted below.
• May 6, 1983 – April 11, 1999 games are not listed.

== Women's swimming & diving ==
The Redbirds have five Missouri Valley Conference tournament championships.

== Men's tennis ==
The Redbirds and Braves first played in men's tennis in 1925.

The series was suspended after the 2014 season when Bradley halted sponsoring men's tennis.

| Illinois State victories | Bradley victories | Ties |

| No. | Date | Location | Winner | Score |
|---|---|---|---|---|
| 1 | May 9, 1925 | Normal, IL | Illinois State | 2–1 |
| 2 | May 25, 1926 | Normal, IL | Bradley | 4–0 |
| 3 | May 29, 1926 | Peoria, IL | Bradley | 3–1 |
| 4 | April 26, 1927 | Normal, IL | Bradley | 5–1 |
| 5 | June 1, 1927 | Peoria, IL | Bradley | 5–0 |
| 6 | April 26, 1933 | Peoria, IL | Bradley | 6–1 |
| 7 | May 23, 1933 | Normal, IL | Bradley | 5–2 |
| 8 | April 14, 1938 | Peoria, IL | Illinois State | 7–0 |
| 9 | April 29, 1938 | Normal, IL | Illinois State | 9–0 |
| 10 | April 29, 1939 | Peoria, IL | Illinois State | 6–0 |
| 11 | May 17, 1939 | Normal, IL | Illinois State | 5–1 |
| 12 | April 19, 1940 | Normal, IL | Illinois State | 6–0 |
| 13 | May 10, 1940 | Peoria, IL | Illinois State | 4–2 |
| 14 | April 24, 1942 | Peoria, IL | Tie | 3–3 |
| 15 | May 5, 1942 | Normal, IL | Illinois State | 5–1 |
| 16 | April 13, 1943 | Peoria, IL | Bradley | 7–0 |
| 17 | April 17, 1943 | Peoria, IL | Bradley | 7–0 |
| 18 | April 16, 1946 | Peoria, IL | Illinois State | 5–2 |
| 19 | May 7, 1946 | Normal, IL | Illinois State | 5–2 |
| 20 | April 12, 1947 | Peoria, IL | Bradley | 7–2 |
| 21 | May 6, 1947 | Normal, IL | Illinois State | 5–4 |
| 22 | April 10, 1948 | Normal, IL | Bradley | 7–2 |
| 23 | May 10, 1948 | Peoria, IL | Bradley | 6–3 |
| 24 | April 9, 1949 | Peoria, IL | Bradley | 4–3 |
| 25 | May 3, 1949 | Normal, IL | Illinois State | 7–0 |
| 26 | April 18, 1950 | Peoria, IL | Illinois State | 6–2 |
| 27 | May 22, 1950 | Normal, IL | Illinois State | 5–2 |
| 28 | April 13, 1951 | Normal, IL | Illinois State | 8–1 |
| 29 | May 4, 1951 | Peoria, IL | Illinois State | 6–3 |
| 30 | April 17, 1952 | Peoria, IL | Bradley | 6–3 |
| 31 | May 6, 1952 | Normal, IL | Bradley | 7–2 |
| 32 | April 9, 1953 | Peoria, IL | Illinois State | 5–4 |
| 33 | April 28, 1953 | Normal, IL | Bradley | 5–4 |
| 34 | April 2, 1954 | Peoria, IL | Bradley | 7–2 |
| 35 | May 19, 1954 | Normal, IL | Illinois State | 5–4 |
| 36 | April 16, 1955 | Peoria, IL | Illinois State | 6–3 |
| 37 | May 18, 1955 | Normal, IL | Illinois State | 8–1 |
| 38 | May 15, 1956 | Normal, IL | Tie | 0–0 |
| 39 | April 13, 1957 | Peoria, IL | Illinois State | 4–3 |
| 40 | May 16, 1957 | Normal, IL | Illinois State | 4–3 |
| 41 | April 15, 1958 | Normal, IL | Illinois State | 8–1 |
| 42 | April 8, 1959 | Normal, IL | Illinois State | 4–0 |
| 43 | April 15, 1960 | Peoria, IL | Illinois State | 5–4 |
| 44 | May 2, 1961 | Normal, IL | Illinois State | 6–3 |
| 45 | May 19, 1961 | Peoria, IL | Bradley | 5–4 |
| 46 | April 13, 1962 | Normal, IL | Illinois State | 9–0 |
| 47 | April 10, 1963 | Peoria, IL | Illinois State | 7–1 |
| 48 | April 28, 1964 | Normal, IL | Illinois State | 8–1 |
| 49 | April 30, 1965 | Peoria, IL | Bradley | 5–4 |
| 50 | April 29, 1966 | Normal, IL | Bradley | 5–4 |
| 51 | April 11, 1967 | Peoria, IL | Bradley | 6–3 |
| 52 | March 30, 1968 | Peoria, IL | Bradley | 7–2 |
| 53 | March 8, 1969 | Peoria, IL | Bradley | 6–3 |
| 54 | March 6, 1970 | Peoria, IL | Bradley | 9–0 |
| 55 | March 26, 1971 | Peoria, IL | Bradley | 5–4 |
| 56 | April 27, 1972 | Normal, IL | Illinois State | 8–1 |

| No. | Date | Location | Winner | Score |
|---|---|---|---|---|
| 57 | March 23, 1973 | Normal, IL | Illinois State | 7–2 |
| 58 | April 12, 1974 | Peoria, IL | Illinois State | 7–1 |
| 59 | March 21, 1975 | Normal, IL | Illinois State | 5–4 |
| 60 | February 13, 1976 | Peoria, IL | Illinois State | 6–3 |
| 61 | April 2, 1976 | Normal, IL | Illinois State | 5–4 |
| 62 | February 4, 1977 | Peoria, IL | Illinois State | 8–1 |
| 63 | February 11, 1977 | Normal, IL | Illinois State | 8–1 |
| 64 | April 16, 1977 | Normal, IL | Illinois State | 7–2 |
| 65 | February 10, 1978 | Normal, IL | Illinois State | 8–1 |
| 66 | March 4, 1978 | Normal, IL | Illinois State | 7–2 |
| 67 | February 16, 1979 | Normal, IL | Illinois State | 5–1 |
| 68 | April 13, 1979 | Normal, IL | Illinois State | 5–4 |
| 69 | June 30, 1981 | Peoria, IL | Illinois State | 9–0 |
| 70 | April 13, 1985 | Normal, IL | Illinois State | 8–0 |
| 71 | June 29, 1986 | Normal, IL | Illinois State | 9–0 |
| 72 | February 1, 1986 | Peoria, IL | Illinois State | 9–0 |
| 73 | February 7, 1987 | Normal, IL | Illinois State | 7–2 |
| 74 | February 11, 1987 | Peoria, IL | Illinois State | 8–1 |
| 75 | February 10, 1988 | Peoria, IL | Illinois State | 9–0 |
| 76 | April 15, 1988 | Normal, IL | Illinois State | 6–3 |
| 77 | February 8, 1989 | Peoria, IL | Illinois State | 7–2 |
| 78 | April 7, 1989 | Normal, IL | Illinois State | 8–1 |
| 79 | February 14, 1990 | Peoria, IL | Illinois State | 7–2 |
| 80 | April 6, 1990 | Normal, IL | Illinois State | 5–1 |
| 81 | February 20, 1991 | Peoria, IL | Illinois State | 6–0 |
| 82 | April 3, 1991 | Normal, IL | Illinois State | 9–0 |
| 83 | February 10, 1992 | Peoria, IL | Illinois State | 8–1 |
| 84 | April 8, 1992 | Normal, IL | Illinois State | 9–0 |
| 85 | February 22, 1993 | Peoria, IL | Illinois State | 7–0 |
| 86 | April 8, 1994 | Normal, IL | Illinois State | 6–1 |
| 87 | March 7, 1994 | Peoria, IL | Bradley | 5–2 |
| 88 | April 19, 1994 | Normal, IL | Illinois State | 7–0 |
| 89 | March 3, 1995 | Peoria, IL | Illinois State | 6–1 |
| 90 | April 21, 1995 | Normal, IL | Illinois State | 6–1 |
| 91 | April 1, 1996 | Normal, IL | Illinois State | 7–0 |
| 92 | April 22, 1997 | Normal, IL | Bradley | 7–0 |
| 93 | April 15, 1998 | Normal, IL | Illinois State | 6–1 |
| 94 | April 7, 1999 | Peoria, IL | Illinois State | 7–0 |
| 95 | March 28, 2000 | Normal, IL | Illinois State | 7–0 |
| 96 | April 14, 2001 | Peoria, IL | Illinois State | 7–0 |
| 97 | April 19, 2002 | Normal, IL | Illinois State | 7–0 |
| 98 | February 22, 2003 | Peoria, IL | Illinois State | 6–1 |
| 99 | February 29, 2004 | Normal, IL | Illinois State | 5–2 |
| 100 | April 6, 2005 | Peoria, IL | Illinois State | 5–2 |
| 101 | April 1, 2006 | Normal, IL (McCormick Courts) | Illinois State | 7–0 |
| 102 | April 13, 2007 | Peoria, IL | Illinois State | 7–0 |
| 103 | March 30, 2008 | Bloomington, IL (Evergreen Racquet Club) | Illinois State | 5–2 |
| 104 | April 3, 2009 | Peoria, IL (David Markin Tennis Courts) | Illinois State | 7–0 |
| 105 | April 24, 2009 | Omaha, NE (Koch Family Tennis Center) | Illinois State | 4–0 |
| 106 | April 8, 2010 | Bloomington, IL (Evergreen Racquet Club) | Illinois State | 7–0 |
| 107 | April 21, 2011 | Peoria, IL (David Markin Tennis Courts) | Illinois State | 6–1 |
| 108 | April 20, 2012 | Bloomington, IL (Evergreen Racquet Club) | Bradley | 5–2 |
| 109 | April 11, 2013 | Peoria, IL | Illinois State | 6–1 |
| 110 | April 26, 2013 | Wichita, KS (Coleman Tennis Complex) | Illinois State | 4–0 |
| 111 | April 11, 2014 | Normal, IL (Gregory Street Tennis Courts) | Illinois State | 6–1 |
Series: Illinois State leads 82–27–2

== Women's tennis ==
The Redbirds and Braves first played in women's tennis in 1977.

They have combined for nine Missouri Valley Conference regular season championships (Illinois State 9 (seven outright), Bradley 0) and six tournament championships (Illinois State 6, Bradley 0).

They have also combined for five postseason tournament appearances (Illinois State 5 (five National Collegiate Athletic Association (NCAA) Division I Women's Championships), Bradley 0).

NOTE: championship/postseason information as of conclusion for 2024-25 season.

| Illinois State victories | Bradley victories | Ties |

| No. | Date | Location | Winner | Score |
|---|---|---|---|---|
| 1 | September 10, 1977 | Normal, IL | Illinois State | 9–0 |
| 2 | October 4, 1977 | Peoria, IL | Illinois State | 9–0 |
| 3 | September 12, 1978 | Normal, IL | Illinois State | 9–0 |
| 4 | March 16, 1983 | Peoria, IL | Bradley | 7–2 |
| 5 | April 27, 1983 | Normal, IL | Bradley | 7–2 |
| 6 | March 16, 1984 | Peoria, IL | Bradley | 5–4 |
| 7 | February 8, 1985 | Normal, IL | Illinois State | 5–4 |
| 8 | April 5, 1985 | Terre Haute, IN | Bradley | 7–2 |
| 9 | February 15, 1986 | Peoria, IL | Bradley | 7–2 |
| 10 | March 28, 1986 | Normal, IL | Bradley | 5–4 |
| 11 | April 12, 1986 | Peoria, IL | Bradley | 5–4 |
| 12 | April 16, 1987 | Normal, IL | Bradley | 5–4 |
| 13 | October 1, 1987 | Peoria, IL | Illinois State | 9–0 |
| 14 | March 30, 1988 | Normal, IL | Illinois State | 8–1 |
| 15 | September 20, 1988 | Peoria, IL | Illinois State | 5–4 |
| 16 | April 12, 1989 | Normal, IL | Illinois State | 8–1 |
| 17 | April 27, 1989 | Normal, IL | Illinois State | 6–0 |
| 18 | April 19, 1990 | Normal, IL | Illinois State | 8–1 |
| 19 | April 17, 1991 | Normal, IL | Illinois State | 6–3 |
| 20 | September 24, 1991 | Normal, IL | Illinois State | 7–2 |
| 21 | February 7, 1992 | Peoria, IL | Illinois State | 7–2 |
| 22 | April 23, 1992 | Des Moines, IA | Illinois State | 6–1 |
| 23 | April 16, 1993 | Peoia, IL | Illinois State | 8–1 |
| 24 | April 6, 1994 | Peoria, IL | Illinois State | 5–4 |
| 25 | April 23, 1994 | Normal, Ill | Illinois State | 5–3 |
| 26 | April 8, 1995 | Normal, IL | Illinois State | 6–0 |
| 27 | February 25, 1996 | Peoria, IL | Illinois State | 8–1 |
| 28 | April 22, 1997 | Normal, IL | Illinois State | 9–0 |
| 29 | April 8, 1998 | Normal, IL | Illinois State | 9–0 |
| 30 | April 7, 1999 | Peoria, IL | Illinois State | 9–0 |
| 31 | April 10, 2000 | Normal, IL | Illinois State | 6–0 |

| No. | Date | Location | Winner | Score |
|---|---|---|---|---|
| 32 | April 1, 2001 | Normal, IL | Illinois State | 6–0 |
| 33 | March 29, 2002 | Normal, IL | Illinois State | 5–0 |
| 34 | April 16, 2003 | Peoria, IL | Illinois State | 7–0 |
| 35 | March 26, 2004 | Peoria, IL | Illinois State | 7–0 |
| 36 | March 30, 2005 | Bloomington, IL (Evergreen Racquet Club) | Illinois State | 7–0 |
| 37 | March 31, 2006 | Normal, IL (McCormick Courts) | Illinois State | 7–0 ^{(5-4)} |
| 38 | March 29, 2007 | Peoria, IL (David Markin Tennis Courts) | Illinois State | 7–0 |
| 39 | March 28, 2008 | Bloomington, IL (Evergreen Racquet Club) | Illinois State | 6–1 |
| 40 | March 27, 2009 | Peoria, IL (The Clubs at River City) | Illinois State | 7–0 |
| 41 | March 26, 2010 | Bloomington, IL (Evergreen Racquet Club) | Illinois State | 7–0 |
| 42 | March 25, 2011 | Peoria, IL (The Clubs at River City) | Illinois State | 6–1 |
| 43 | March 30, 2012 | Normal, IL (Gregory Street Tennis Courts) | Illinois State | 7–0 |
| 44 | March 29, 2013 | Bloomington, IL (Evergreen Racquet Club) | Illinois State | 7–0 |
| 45 | March 26, 2014 | Bloomington, IL (Evergreen Racquet Club) | Illinois State | 7–0 |
| 46 | April 15, 2015 | Peoria, IL (David Markin Tennis Courts) | Bradley | 4–3 |
| 47 | April 2, 2016 | Bloomington, IL (Evergreen Racquet Club) | Illinois State | 5–2 |
| 48 | April 29, 2016 | Wichita, KS (Wichita Country Club) | Bradley | 4–1 |
| 49 | April 1, 2017 | Peoria, IL (David Markin Tennis Courts) | Illinois State | 5–2 |
| 50 | April 28, 2017 | Bloomington, IL (Bloomington Tennis Center) | Bradley | 4–3 |
| 51 | March 31, 2018 | Bloomington, IL (Bloomington Tennis Center) | Illinois State | 5–2 |
| 52 | March 30, 2019 | Peoria, IL (The Clubs at River City) | Illinois State | 4–3 |
| 53 | April 27, 2019 | Cedar Falls, IA (UNI Tennis Complex) | Illinois State | 4–0 |
| 54 | March 27, 2021 | Peoria, IL (The Clubs at River City) | Illinois State | 4–3 |
| 55 | March 27, 2022 | Bloomington, IL (Evergreen Racquet Club | Illinois State | 6–1 |
| 56 | April 23, 2022 | Des Moines, IA (Roger Knapp Tennis Center) | Illinois State | 4–0 |
| 57 | April 2, 2023 | Peoria, IL (David Markin Tennis Courts) | Illinois State | 6–1 |
| 58 | April 7, 2024 | Bloomington, IL (Evergreen Racquet Club) | Illinois State | 6–1 |
| 59 | March 22, 2025 | Peoria, IL (David Markin Tennis Courts) | Illinois State | 5–2 |
| 60 | April 19, 2026 | Peoria, IL (David Markin Tennis Courts) | Illinois State | 5–2 |
Series: Illinois State leads 49–11

== Men's track & field ==
The Redbirds and Braves have combined for eleven Missouri Valley Conference indoor tournament championships (Illinois State 11, Bradley 0) and four outdoor tournament championships (Illinois State 4, Bradley 0).

== Women's track & field ==
The Redbirds and Braves have combined for fourteen Missouri Valley Conference indoor tournament championships (Illinois State 14, Bradley 0) and ten outdoor tournament championships (Illinois State 10, Bradley 0).

== Women's volleyball ==
The Redbirds and Braves first played in women's volleyball in 1974.

They have combined for eleven Missouri Valley Conference regular season championships (Illinois State 11, Bradley 0) and thirteen tournament championships (Illinois State 13, Bradley 0).

They have also combined for twenty postseason tournament appearances (Illinois State 20 (three Association for Intercollegiate Athletics for Women (AIAW) Championship Tournament, seventeen National Collegiate Athletic Association (NCAA) Division I Tournament), Bradley 0).

| Illinois State victories | Bradley victories | Ties |

| No. | Date | Location | Winner | Score |
|---|---|---|---|---|
| 1 | September 21, 1974 | Peoria, IL (Robertson Field House) | Illinois State | 2–0 |
| 2 | October 1, 1974 | Normal, IL (Horton Field House) | Illinois State | 2–1 |
| 3 | October 19, 1974 | Macomb, IL (Western Hall) | Illinois State | 2–0 |
| 4 | September 18, 1976 | Normal, IL (Horton Field House) | Illinois State | 2–0 |
| 5 | October 23, 1976 | Peoria, IL (Robertson Field House) | Illinois State | 2–0 |
| 6 | October 30, 1976 | Normal, IL (Horton Field House) | Illinois State | 2–0 |
| 7 | October 19, 1977 | Peoria, IL (Robertson Field House) | Illinois State | 2–1 |
| 8 | September 16, 1978 | Normal, IL (Horton Field House) | Bradley | 3–0 |
| 9 | September 27, 1978 | Peoria, IL (Robertson Field House) | Bradley | 3–0 |
| 10 | October 11, 1978 | Peoria, IL (Robertson Field House) | Bradley | 3–1 |
| 11 | October 27, 1979 | Peoria, IL (Robertson Field House) | Illinois State | 3–1 |
| 12 | September 11, 1980 | Peoria, IL (Robertson Field House) | Bradley | 3–0 |
| 13 | September 24, 1980 | Normal, IL (Horton Field House) | Illinois State | 3–2 |
| 14 | October 15, 1980 | Peoria, IL (Robertson Field House) | Bradley | 3–0 |
| 15 | November 7, 1983 | Peoria, IL (Robertson Field House) | Illinois State | 3–1 |
| 16 | November 10, 1984 | Normal, IL (Horton Field House) | Illinois State | 3–1 |
| 17 | October 18, 1985 | Normal, IL (Horton Field House) | Illinois State | 3–1 |
| 18 | November 21, 1985 | Carbondale, IL (Davies Gym) | Illinois State | 3–2 |
| 19 | October 25, 1986 | Peoria, IL (Robertson Field House) | Illinois State | 3–0 |
| 20 | October 31, 1987 | Normal, IL (Horton Field House) | Illinois State | 3–0 |
| 21 | October 15, 1988 | Peoria, IL (Robertson Field House) | Illinois State | 3–0 |
| 22 | November 3, 1989 | Normal, IL (Redbird Arena) | Illinois State | 3–0 |
| 23 | October 19, 1990 | Peoria, IL (Robertson Field House) | Illinois State | 3–1 |
| 24 | October 19, 1991 | Normal, IL (Redbird Arena) | Illinois State | 3–0 |
| 25 | September 22, 1992 | Peoria, IL (Robertson Field House) | Illinois State | 3–0 |
| 26 | October 30, 1992 | Normal, IL (Redbird Arena) | Illinois State | 3–0 |
| 27 | September 21, 1993 | Normal, IL (Redbird Arena) | Illinois State | 3–0 |
| 28 | October 26, 1993 | Peoria, IL (Robertson Field House) | Illinois State | 3–0 |
| 29 | October 23, 1994 | Peoria, IL (Robertson Field House) | Bradley | 3–0 |
| 30 | November 4, 1994 | Normal, IL (Redbird Arena) | Illinois State | 3–0 |
| 31 | September 26, 1995 | Normal, IL (Redbird Arena) | Illinois State | 3–0 |
| 32 | October 27, 1995 | Peoria, IL (Robertson Field House) | Bradley | 3–1 |
| 33 | November 17, 1995 | Normal, IL (Redbird Arena) | Illinois State | 3–2 |
| 34 | October 4, 1996 | Peoria, IL (Robertson Field House) | Illinois State | 3–0 |
| 35 | November 2, 1996 | Normal, IL (Redbird Arena) | Illinois State | 3–0 |
| 36 | October 3, 1997 | Normal, IL (Redbird Arena) | Illinois State | 3–0 |
| 37 | November 1, 1997 | Peoria, IL (Robertson Field House) | Illinois State | 3–2 |
| 38 | October 11, 1998 | Peoria, IL (Robertson Field House) | Illinois State | 3–0 |
| 39 | November 6, 1998 | Normal, IL (Redbird Arena) | Illinois State | 3–0 |
| 40 | September 12, 1999 | Normal, IL (Redbird Arena) | Illinois State | 3–0 |
| 41 | November 12, 1999 | Normal, IL (Redbird Arena) | Illinois State | 3–0 |
| 42 | November 19, 1999 | Cedar Falls, IA (West Gymnasium) | Illinois State | 3–2 |
| 43 | September 15, 2000 | Peoria, IL (Robertson Field House) | Illinois State | 3–0 |
| 44 | November 18, 2000 | Normal, IL (Redbird Arena) | Illinois State | 3–2 |
| 45 | October 6, 2001 | Peoria, IL (Robertson Field House) | Bradley | 3–1 |
| 46 | November 2, 2001 | Normal, IL (Redbird Arena) | Bradley | 3–2 |
| 47 | September 13, 2002 | Normal, IL (Redbird Arena) | Bradley | 3–1 |
| 48 | November 16, 2002 | Peoria, IL (Robertson Field House) | Illinois State | 3–2 |
| 49 | September 19, 2003 | Peoria, IL (Robertson Field House) | Bradley | 3–2 |

| No. | Date | Location | Winner | Score |
|---|---|---|---|---|
| 50 | November 22, 2003 | Normal, IL (Redbird Arena) | Illinois State | 3–0 |
| 51 | September 24, 2004 | Normal, IL (Redbird Arena) | Illinois State | 3–1 |
| 52 | October 23, 2004 | Peoria, IL (Robertson Field House) | Illinois State | 3–0 |
| 53 | October 9, 2005 | Normal, IL (Redbird Arena) | Illinois State | 3–1 |
| 54 | November 4, 2005 | Peoria, IL (Robertson Field House) | Illinois State | 3–1 |
| 55 | November 25, 2005 | Cedar Falls, IA (West Gymnasium) | Illinois State | 3–0 |
| 56 | October 12, 2006 | Normal, IL (Redbird Arena) | Illinois State | 3–1 |
| 57 | November 10, 2006 | Peoria, IL (Robertson Field House) | Illinois State | 3–0 |
| 58 | October 5, 2007 | Peoria, IL (Robertson Field House) | Illinois State | 3–0 |
| 59 | November 3, 2007 | Normal, IL (Redbird Arena) | Illinois State | 3–0 |
| 60 | September 28, 2008 | Normal, IL (Redbird Arena) | Illinois State | 3–1 |
| 61 | October 23, 2008 | East Peoria, IL (Lorene Ramsey Gymnasium) | Illinois State | 3–0 |
| 62 | October 9, 2009 | Normal, IL (Redbird Arena) | Illinois State | 3–0 |
| 63 | November 7, 2009 | East Peoria, IL (Lorene Ramsey Gymnasium) | Illinois State | 3–0 |
| 64 | October 17, 2010 | Normal, IL (Redbird Arena) | Illinois State | 3–0 |
| 65 | November 11, 2010 | Peoria, IL (Renaissance Coliseum) | Bradley | 3–0 |
| 66 | September 25, 2011 | Normal, IL (Redbird Arena) | Illinois State | 3–1 |
| 67 | October 20, 2011 | Peoria, IL (Renaissance Coliseum) | Illinois State | 3–0 |
| 68 | September 22, 2012 | Normal, IL (Redbird Arena) | Illinois State | 3–1 |
| 69 | October 19, 2012 | Peoria, IL (Renaissance Coliseum) | Illinois State | 3–0 |
| 70 | October 5, 2013 | Peoria, IL (Renaissance Coliseum) | Illinois State | 3–0 |
| 71 | November 1, 2013 | Normal, IL (Redbird Arena) | Illinois State | 3–1 |
| 72 | October 10, 2014 | Peoria, IL (Renaissance Coliseum) | Illinois State | 3–0 |
| 73 | November 8, 2014 | Normal, IL (Redbird Arena) | Illinois State | 3–0 |
| 74 | October 10, 2015 | Peoria, IL (Renaissance Coliseum) | Illinois State | 3–0 |
| 75 | November 6, 2015 | Normal, IL (Redbird Arena) | Illinois State | 3–1 |
| 76 | September 24, 2016 | Normal, IL (Redbird Arena) | Illinois State | 3–0 |
| 77 | October 21, 2016 | Peoria, IL (Renaissance Coliseum) | Illinois State | 3–0 |
| 78 | October 13, 2017 | Normal, IL (Redbird Arena) | Illinois State | 3–1 |
| 79 | November 11, 2017 | Peoria, IL (Renaissance Coliseum) | Illinois State | 3–1 |
| 80 | October 15, 2018 | Normal, IL (Redbird Arena) | Illinois State | 3–1 |
| 81 | November 16, 2018 | Peoria, IL (Renaissance Coliseum) | Bradley | 3–0 |
| 82 | October 4, 2019 | Peoria, IL (Renaissance Coliseum) | Bradley | 3–2 |
| 83 | November 1, 2019 | Normal, IL (Redbird Arena) | Bradley | 3–2 |
| 84 | January 25, 2021 | Normal, IL (Redbird Arena) | Illinois State | 3–0 |
| 85 | February 1, 2021 | Peoria, IL (Renaissance Coliseum) | Bradley | 3–0 |
| 86 | April 2, 2021 | Normal, IL (Redbird Arena) | Illinois State | 3–1 |
| 87 | October 18, 2021 | Peoria, IL (Renaissance Coliseum) | Illinois State | 3–2 |
| 88 | November 19, 2021 | Normal, IL (Redbird Arena) | Illinois State | 3–0 |
| 89 | October 4, 2022 | Peoria, IL (Renaissance Coliseum) | Bradley | 3–1 |
| 90 | November 16, 2022 | Normal, IL (Redbird Arena) | Bradley | 3–1 |
| 91 | October 16, 2023 | Normal, IL (CEFCU Arena) | Illinois State | 3–2 |
| 92 | November 15, 2023 | Peoria, IL (Renaissance Coliseum) | Illinois State | 3–1 |
| 93 | October 14, 2024 | Peoria, IL (Renaissance Coliseum) | Illinois State | 3–2 |
| 94 | November 20, 2024 | Normal, IL (CEFCU Arena) | Illinois State | 3–1 |
| 95 | September 27, 2025 | Peoria, IL (Renaissance Coliseum) | Bradley | 3–2 |
| 96 | October 28, 2025 | Normal, IL (CEFCU Arena) | Illinois State | 3–0 |
Series: Illinois State leads 77–19
