= 1986 Indiana State Sycamores football team =

American college football season

1986 Indiana State Sycamores football
- Conference: Gateway Collegiate Athletic Conference
- Record: 3–8 (1–4 GCAC)
- Head coach: Dennis Raetz (7th season)
- Home stadium: Memorial Stadium

1986 Gateway Collegiate Athletic Conference football standings
	Conf.					Overall
Team	W		L		T	W		L		T
No. 3 Eastern Illinois $^	5	–	1	–	0	11	–	2	–	0
No. 17 Southern Illinois	4	–	2	–	0	7	–	4	–	0
Northern Iowa	4	–	2	–	0	7	–	3	–	1
Illinois State	3	–	3	–	0	5	–	5	–	0
Western Illinois	2	–	4	–	0	6	–	5	–	0
SW Missouri State	1	–	5	–	0	3	–	7	–	0
Indiana State	1	–	5	–	0	3	–	8	–	0
$ – Conference champion; ^ – NCAA Division I-AA playoff participant; Rankings from NCAA Division I-AA Football Committee poll

The 1986 Indiana State Sycamores football team represented Indiana State University as a member of the Gateway Collegiate Athletic Conference (GCAC) during the 1986 NCAA Division I-AA football season. The Sycamores were led by seventh-year head coach Dennis Raetz and played their home games at Memorial Stadium. Indiana State finished the season 3–8 overall and 1–4 in GCAC play to finish in sixth place.

== Schedule ==
Date	Opponent	Site	Result	Attendance	Source
September 6	St. Cloud State*	Memorial Stadium; Terre Haute, IN	W 27–18		
September 13	Southwest Missouri State	Memorial Stadium; Terre Haute, IN	W 14–10		
September 20	at Iowa State*	Cyclone Stadium; Ames, IA	L 9–64	36,650	
September 27	at Kansas*	Memorial Stadium; Lawrence, KS	L 6–20	32,400	
October 4	vs. Ball State*	Hoosier Dome; Indianapolis, IN (rivalry)	L 3–16	8,325	
October 11	at Southern Illinois	McAndrew Stadium; Carbondale, IL	L 14–16	10,000	
October 18	Illinois State^{†}	Memorial Stadium; Terre Haute, IN	L 28–38		
October 25	Buffalo State*	Memorial Stadium; Terre Haute, IN	W 27–0	1,800	
November 1	at Cincinnati*	Nippert Stadium; Cincinnati, OH	L 14–46	19,369	
November 8	No. 4 Eastern Illinois	Memorial Stadium; Terre Haute, IN	L 14–31		
November 13	at Northern Iowa	UNI-Dome; Cedar Falls, IA	L 10–45	7,102	
*Non-conference game; ^{†}Homecoming; Rankings from NCAA Division I-AA Football Committee Poll released prior to the game
