= 1986 Southern Illinois Salukis football team =

American college football season

1986 Southern Illinois Salukis football
- Conference: Gateway Collegiate Athletic Conference
- Record: 7–4 (4–2 GCAC)
- Head coach: Ray Dorr (3rd season)
- Home stadium: McAndrew Stadium

1986 Gateway Collegiate Athletic Conference football standings
| | Conf. | | | | | Overall |
| Team | W | | L | | T | W | | L | | T |
|---|---|---|---|---|---|---|---|---|---|---|
| No. 3 Eastern Illinois $^ | 5 | – | 1 | – | 0 | 11 | – | 2 | – | 0 |
| No. 17 Southern Illinois | 4 | – | 2 | – | 0 | 7 | – | 4 | – | 0 |
| Northern Iowa | 4 | – | 2 | – | 0 | 7 | – | 3 | – | 1 |
| Illinois State | 3 | – | 3 | – | 0 | 5 | – | 5 | – | 0 |
| Western Illinois | 2 | – | 4 | – | 0 | 6 | – | 5 | – | 0 |
| SW Missouri State | 1 | – | 5 | – | 0 | 3 | – | 7 | – | 0 |
| Indiana State | 1 | – | 5 | – | 0 | 3 | – | 8 | – | 0 |
$ – Conference champion; ^ – NCAA Division I-AA playoff participant; Rankings from NCAA Division I-AA Football Committee poll

The 1986 Southern Illinois Salukis football team was an American football team that represented Southern Illinois University (now known as Southern Illinois University Carbondale) in the Gateway Collegiate Athletic Conference (GCAC) during the 1986 NCAA Division I-AA football season. Under third-year head coach Ray Dorr, the team compiled a 7–4 record (4–2 against conference opponents). The team played its home games at McAndrew Stadium in Carbondale, Illinois.

== Schedule ==
| Date | Opponent | Site | Result | Attendance | Source |
|---|---|---|---|---|---|
| August 30 | at No. 7 Arkansas State* | Indian Stadium; Jonesboro, AR | L 7–22 | 16,321 | |
| September 6 | Austin Peay* | McAndrew Stadium; Carbondale, IL | W 24–17 | 13,800 | |
| September 13 | at No. 20 Murray State* | Roy Stewart Stadium; Murray, KY | W 31–0 | 8,500 | |
| September 20 | Eastern Illinois | McAndrew Stadium; Carbondale, IL | L 7–52 | 10,100 | |
| September 27 | Youngstown State* | McAndrew Stadium; Carbondale, IL | W 24–17 | 15,100 | |
| October 4 | at Kansas | Memorial Stadium; Lawrence, KS | L 23–35 | 22,500 | |
| October 11 | Indiana State | McAndrew Stadium; Carbondale, IL | W 16–14 | 10,000 | |
| October 18 | No. 16 Northern Iowa | McAndrew Stadium; Carbondale, IL | W 27–24 | 14,200 | |
| October 25 | at Illinois State | Hancock Stadium; Normal, IL | W 20–3 | 10,346 | |
| November 1 | at Southwest Missouri State | Briggs Stadium; Springfield, MO | W 35–14 | 3,000 | |
| November 8 | Western Illinois | McAndrew Stadium; Carbondale, IL | L 21–24 | 12,500 | |
*Non-conference game; Rankings from NCAA Division I-AA Football Committee Poll released prior to the game
