= 1986 Western Illinois Leathernecks football team =

American college football season

1986 Western Illinois Leathernecks football
- Conference: Gateway Collegiate Athletic Conference
- Record: 6–5 (2–4 GCAC)
- Head coach: Bruce Craddock (4th season)
- Home stadium: Hanson Field

1986 Gateway Collegiate Athletic Conference football standings
	Conf.					Overall
Team	W		L		T	W		L		T
No. 3 Eastern Illinois $^	5	–	1	–	0	11	–	2	–	0
No. 17 Southern Illinois	4	–	2	–	0	7	–	4	–	0
Northern Iowa	4	–	2	–	0	7	–	3	–	1
Illinois State	3	–	3	–	0	5	–	5	–	0
Western Illinois	2	–	4	–	0	6	–	5	–	0
SW Missouri State	1	–	5	–	0	3	–	7	–	0
Indiana State	1	–	5	–	0	3	–	8	–	0
$ – Conference champion; ^ – NCAA Division I-AA playoff participant; Rankings from NCAA Division I-AA Football Committee poll

The 1986 Western Illinois Leathernecks football team represented Western Illinois University as a member of the Gateway Collegiate Athletic Conference (GCAC) during the 1986 NCAA Division I-AA football season. Led by fourth-year head coach Bruce Craddock, the Leathernecks compiled an overall record of 6–5, with a mark of 2–4 in conference play, and finished fifth in the GCAC. The Leathernecks were led by senior All-American center Frank Winters, senior All- American defensive lineman Todd Auer, and sophomore quarterback Paul Singer, who was 6 -2 as the starter and led the Leathernecks in passing for the second consecutive season. All - conference receiver Albert Brown led the Leathernecks in receiving yards.

== Schedule ==
Date	Opponent	Site	Result	Attendance	Source
August 30	at Kansas State*	KSU Stadium; Manhattan, KS	L 7–35	26,320	
September 13	Mankato State*	Hanson Field; Macomb, IL	W 17–13	11,231	
September 20	at Southwest Missouri State	Briggs Stadium; Springfield, MO	W 27–10		
September 27	at Northern Illinois*	Huskie Stadium; DeKalb, IL	W 10–0	26,364	
October 4	Illinois State	Hanson Field; Macomb, IL	L 7–17	12,136	
October 11	at Northern Michigan*	Memorial Field; Marquette, MI	W 28–22		
October 18	No. T–9 Eastern Illinois	Hanson Field; Macomb, IL	L 3–37		
October 25	at Northern Iowa	UNI-Dome; Cedar Falls, IA	L 30–32	13,152	
November 1	Northwest Missouri State*	Hanson Field; Macomb, IL	W 26–9		
November 8	at Southern Illinois	McAndrew Stadium; Carbondale, IL	W 24–21	12,500	
November 15	No. 15 Sam Houston State*	Hanson Field; Macomb, IL	L 13–16	4,628	
*Non-conference game; Rankings from NCAA Division I-AA Football Committee Poll released prior to the game
