= 1986 Northern Iowa Panthers football team =

American college football season

1986 Northern Iowa Panthers football
- Conference: Gateway Collegiate Athletic Conference
- Record: 7–3–1 (4–2 GCAC)
- Head coach: Darrell Mudra (4th season)
- Defensive coordinator: Dennis Remmert (16th season)
- Home stadium: UNI-Dome

1986 Gateway Collegiate Athletic Conference football standings
	Conf.					Overall
Team	W		L		T	W		L		T
No. 3 Eastern Illinois $^	5	–	1	–	0	11	–	2	–	0
No. 17 Southern Illinois	4	–	2	–	0	7	–	4	–	0
Northern Iowa	4	–	2	–	0	7	–	3	–	1
Illinois State	3	–	3	–	0	5	–	5	–	0
Western Illinois	2	–	4	–	0	6	–	5	–	0
SW Missouri State	1	–	5	–	0	3	–	7	–	0
Indiana State	1	–	5	–	0	3	–	8	–	0
$ – Conference champion; ^ – NCAA Division I-AA playoff participant; Rankings from NCAA Division I-AA Football Committee poll

The 1986 Northern Iowa Panthers football team was an American football team that represented the University of Northern Iowa as a member of the Gateway Collegiate Athletic Conference (Gateway Conference) during the 1986 NCAA Division I-AA football season. In its fourth season under head coach Darrell Mudra, the team compiled a 7–3–1 record (4–2 in conference games) and tied for second place the Gateway Conference. The Panthers' 66–38 victory over McNeese State, which included four touchdown passes by Northern Iowa, was the fourth highest scoring game (both teams) in Northern Iowa history. On the season, the Panthers gained an average of 473.9 yards of total offense, including 311.5 passing yards, per game.

Quarterback Mike Smith completed 228 of 386 passes for 3,125 yards (284.1 yards per game) and 27 touchdowns, including six touchdown passes against McNeese State. Five Northern Iowa players were honored as first-team players on the 1986 all-Gateway Conference football team: running back Carl Boyd; tight end Brian Baker; defensive end Jeff Bealles; linebacker Mark Farley; and punter Clay Netusil (43.11 yards per punt). Five Northern Iowa players, including quarterback Mike Smith, were named to the second team.

The team played its home games at the UNI-Dome in Cedar Falls, Iowa.

== Schedule ==
Date	Time	Opponent	Rank	Site	Result	Attendance	Source
September 6	7:30 p.m.	at Mankato State*		Blakeslee Stadium; Mankato, MN	T 16–16	4,000	
September 13	7:00 p.m.	at Kansas State*		KSU Stadium; Manhattan, KS	W 17–0	28,820	
September 27	1:30 p.m.	Southwest Missouri State^{†}		UNI-Dome; Cedar Falls, IA	W 45–3	13,000	
October 4	7:00 p.m.	Arkansas–Pine Bluff*		UNI-Dome; Cedar Falls, IA	W 36–7	14,852	
October 11	1:30 p.m.	at No. 11 Eastern Illinois	No. 8	O'Brien Stadium; Charleston, IL	L 30–31	11,052	
October 18	1:30 p.m.	at Southern Illinois	No. 16	McAndrew Stadium; Carbondale, IL	L 24–27	14,200	
October 25	7:00 p.m.	Western Illinois		UNI-Dome; Cedar Falls, IA	W 32–30	13,152	
November 1	1:00 p.m.	at Montana State*		Sales Stadium; Bozeman, MT	L 25–46	5,227	
November 8	7:00 p.m.	McNeese State*		UNI-Dome; Cedar Falls, IA	W 55–38	7,575	
November 13	7:00 p.m.	Indiana State		UNI-Dome; Cedar Falls, IA	W 45–10	7,102	
November 22	7:00 p.m.	Illinois State		UNI-Dome; Cedar Falls, IA	W 22–13	7,452	
*Non-conference game; ^{†}Homecoming; Rankings from NCAA Division I-AA Football Committee Poll released prior to the game; All times are in Central time
