= 1986 Southwest Missouri State Bears football team =

American college football season

1986 Southwest Missouri State Bears football
- Conference: Gateway Collegiate Athletic Conference
- Record: 3–7 (1–5 GCAC)
- Head coach: Jesse Branch (1st season)
- Captains: David Heim; Chris Tayrian
- Home stadium: Briggs Stadium

1986 Gateway Collegiate Athletic Conference football standings
	Conf.					Overall
Team	W		L		T	W		L		T
No. 3 Eastern Illinois $^	5	–	1	–	0	11	–	2	–	0
No. 17 Southern Illinois	4	–	2	–	0	7	–	4	–	0
Northern Iowa	4	–	2	–	0	7	–	3	–	1
Illinois State	3	–	3	–	0	5	–	5	–	0
Western Illinois	2	–	4	–	0	6	–	5	–	0
SW Missouri State	1	–	5	–	0	3	–	7	–	0
Indiana State	1	–	5	–	0	3	–	8	–	0
$ – Conference champion; ^ – NCAA Division I-AA playoff participant; Rankings from NCAA Division I-AA Football Committee poll

The 1986 Southwest Missouri State Bears football team represented Southwest Missouri State University (now known as Missouri State University) as a member of the Gateway Collegiate Athletic Conference (GCAC) during the 1986 NCAA Division I-AA football season. Led by first-year head coach Jesse Branch, the Bears compiled an overall record of 3–7, with a mark of 1–5 in conference play, and finished tied for sixth in the GCAC.

== Schedule ==
Date	Opponent	Site	Result	Attendance	Source
September 6	at Illinois State	Hancock Stadium; Normal, IL	W 17–16	6,458	
September 13	at Indiana State	Memorial Stadium; Terre Haute, IN	L 10–14		
September 20	Western Illinois	Briggs Stadium; Springfield, MO	L 10–27		
September 27	at Northern Iowa	UNI-Dome; Cedar Falls, IA	L 3–45	13,000	
October 4	No. 12 Nicholls State*	Briggs Stadium; Springfield, MO	L 0–31		
October 11	at Jackson State*	Mississippi Veterans Memorial Stadium; Jackson, MS	W 10–6	20,000	
October 18	Middle Tennessee*	Briggs Stadium; Springfield, MO	L 19–42	3,000	
October 25	No. T–8 Eastern Illinois	Briggs Stadium; Springfield, MO	L 20–34	6,000	
November 1	Southern Illinois	Briggs Stadium; Springfield, MO	L 14–35	3,000	
November 8	at Central Missouri State*	Vernon Kennedy Field; Warrensburg, MO	W 24–13		
*Non-conference game; Rankings from NCAA Division I-AA Football Committee Poll released prior to the game
