= GCAC =

GCAC may stand for:

- Gulf Coast Athletic Conference, former name of the HBCU Athletic Conference, which is an intercollegiate athletic conference in the Division I ranks of the NAIA
- Gateway Collegiate Athletic Conference, a former women's athletic conference with one men's sport (football) in the Division I ranks of the NCAA
- Girls Catholic Athletic Conference, an American high school athletic conference, counterpart of the Chicago Catholic League
