= 1986 Eastern Illinois Panthers football team =

American college football season

1986 Eastern Illinois Panthers football

GCAC champion

NCAA Division I-AA Quarterfinal, L 22–24 vs. Eastern Kentucky
- Conference: Gateway Collegiate Athletic Conference
- Record: 11–2 (5–1 GCAC)
- Head coach: Al Molde (4th season)
- Home stadium: O'Brien Stadium

1986 Gateway Collegiate Athletic Conference football standings
	Conf.					Overall
Team	W		L		T	W		L		T
No. 3 Eastern Illinois $^	5	–	1	–	0	11	–	2	–	0
No. 17 Southern Illinois	4	–	2	–	0	7	–	4	–	0
Northern Iowa	4	–	2	–	0	7	–	3	–	1
Illinois State	3	–	3	–	0	5	–	5	–	0
Western Illinois	2	–	4	–	0	6	–	5	–	0
SW Missouri State	1	–	5	–	0	3	–	7	–	0
Indiana State	1	–	5	–	0	3	–	8	–	0
$ – Conference champion; ^ – NCAA Division I-AA playoff participant; Rankings from NCAA Division I-AA Football Committee poll

The 1986 Eastern Illinois Panthers football team represented Eastern Illinois University as a member of the Gateway Collegiate Athletic Conference (GCAC) during the 1986 NCAA Division I-AA football season. Led by fourth-year head coach Al Molde, the Panthers played their home games at O'Brien Stadium in Charleston, Illinois. Eastern Illinois finished the season with an overall record of 11–2 and won the GCAC title with a mark of 5–1 in conference play. The team was invited to the NCAA Division I-AA Football Championship playoffs, where they beat Murray State in the first round before losing to Eastern Kentucky in the quarterfinals.

== Schedule ==
Date	Opponent	Rank	Site	Result	Attendance	Source
August 30	at Illinois State	No. 18	Hancock Stadium; Normal, IL (rivalry)	L 20–23		
September 6	Northeast Missouri State*	No. 18	O'Brien Stadium; Charleston, IL	W 41–31		
September 13	at Northern Michigan*	No. 18	Memorial Field; Marquette, MI	W 24–21		
September 20	No. 20 Southern Illinois		O'Brien Stadium; Charleston, IL	W 52–7	10,100	
October 4	Liberty*	No. 16	O'Brien Stadium; Charleston, IL	W 40–15	6,850	
October 11	No. 8 Northern Iowa	No. 11	O'Brien Stadium; Charleston, IL	W 31–30	11,052	
October 18	at Western Illinois	No. T–9	Hanson Field; Macomb, IL	W 37–3		
October 25	at Southwest Missouri State	No. T–8	Briggs Stadium; Springfield, MO	W 34–20	6,000	
November 1	Winona State*	No. 6	O'Brien Stadium; Charleston, IL	W 64–0		
November 8	at Indiana State	No. 4	Memorial Stadium; Terre Haute, IN	W 31–14		
November 15	Western Kentucky*	No. 4	O'Brien Stadium; Charleston, IL	W 35–18	6,020	
November 29	No. 18 Murray State*	No. 3	O'Brien Stadium; Charleston, IL (NCAA Division I-AA First Round)	W 28–21	4,500	
December 6	No. 10 Eastern Kentucky*	No. 3	O'Brien Stadium; Charleston, IL (NCAA Division I-AA Quarterfinal)	L 22–24	4,149	
*Non-conference game; Rankings from NCAA Division I-AA Football Committee Poll released prior to the game

== Roster ==
1986 Eastern Illinois Panthers football team roster
Players
Coaches
Offense

Pos.	#	Name	Class
WR	2	Roy Banks	Sr
QB	11	Pat Carroll	Jr
OT	78	Chris Geile	Sr
WR	44	Dave Lewandowki	Jr
TE	32	Shon McCray	Jr
WR	13	Mike Milosovic	Jr
QB	18	Sean Payton	Sr
OT	63	Dave Popp	So

Defense

Pos.	#	Name	Class
SS	42	Bob Bronaugh	Sr
LB	59	Bill Cochrane	Jr
FS	12	Scott Johnson	So
DT	67	John Jurkovic	So
DE	95	Dave Lewandowki	Jr

Special teams

Pos.	#	Name	Class
LS	75	Walter Brzeski	Jr

Head coach

- Al Molde

Coordinators/assistant coaches

Legend

- (C) Team captain
- (S) Suspended
- (I) Ineligible
- Injured
- Redshirt
