= 1986 Austin Peay Governors football team =

American college football season

1986 Austin Peay Governors football
- Conference: Ohio Valley Conference
- Record: 5–6 (3–4 OVC)
- Head coach: Emory Hale (6th season)
- Home stadium: Municipal Stadium

1986 Ohio Valley Conference football standings
	Conf.					Overall
Team	W		L		T	W		L		T
No. 10 Eastern Kentucky ^	6	–	1	–	0	10	–	3	–	1
No. 18 Murray State $^	6	–	1	–	0	7	–	4	–	1
Akron	4	–	3	–	0	7	–	4	–	0
Middle Tennessee	4	–	3	–	0	6	–	5	–	0
Morehead State	3	–	4	–	0	7	–	4	–	0
Austin Peay	3	–	4	–	0	5	–	6	–	0
Youngstown State	2	–	5	–	0	2	–	9	–	0
Tennessee Tech	0	–	7	–	0	0	–	10	–	0
$ – Conference champion; ^ – NCAA Division I-AA playoff participant; Rankings from NCAA Division I-AA Football Committee poll

The 1986 Austin Peay Governors football team represented Austin Peay State University as a member of the Ohio Valley Conference (OVC) during the 1986 NCAA Division I-AA football season. Led by sixth-year head coach Emory Hale, the Governors compiled an overall record of 5–6, with a mark of 3–4 in conference play, and finished tied for fifth in the OVC.

== Schedule ==
Date	Opponent	Site	Result	Attendance	Source
September 6	at Southern Illinois*	McAndrew Stadium; Carbondale, IL	L 17–24	13,800	
September 13	Tennessee–Martin*	Municipal Stadium; Clarksville, TN	W 36–0	5,603	
September 20	Kentucky State*	Municipal Stadium; Clarksville, TN	W 24–7	5,314	
October 4	Middle Tennessee	Municipal Stadium; Clarksville, TN	W 7–0 ^{OT}	6,037	
October 11	at No. 4 Morehead State	Jayne Stadium; Morehead, KY	L 10–27	8,000	
October 18	Youngstown State	Municipal Stadium; Clarksville, TN	W 13–10		
October 25	Western Kentucky*	Municipal Stadium; Clarksville, TN	L 20–34	3,117	
November 1	Eastern Kentucky	Municipal Stadium; Clarksville, TN	L 17–27	2,513	
November 8	at Akron	Rubber Bowl; Akron, OH	L 16–31		
November 15	at Tennessee Tech	Tucker Stadium; Cookeville, TN	W 23–13		
November 22	Murray State	Municipal Stadium; Clarksville, TN	L 14–24	3,763	
*Non-conference game; Rankings from NCAA Division I-AA Football Committee Poll released prior to the game
