= 1986 Morehead State Eagles football team =

American college football season

1986 Morehead State Eagles football
- Conference: Ohio Valley Conference
- Record: 7–4 (3–4 OVC)
- Head coach: Bill Baldridge (3rd season)
- Home stadium: Jayne Stadium

1986 Ohio Valley Conference football standings
	Conf.					Overall
Team	W		L		T	W		L		T
No. 10 Eastern Kentucky ^	6	–	1	–	0	10	–	3	–	1
No. 18 Murray State $^	6	–	1	–	0	7	–	4	–	1
Akron	4	–	3	–	0	7	–	4	–	0
Middle Tennessee	4	–	3	–	0	6	–	5	–	0
Morehead State	3	–	4	–	0	7	–	4	–	0
Austin Peay	3	–	4	–	0	5	–	6	–	0
Youngstown State	2	–	5	–	0	2	–	9	–	0
Tennessee Tech	0	–	7	–	0	0	–	10	–	0
$ – Conference champion; ^ – NCAA Division I-AA playoff participant; Rankings from NCAA Division I-AA Football Committee poll

The 1986 Morehead State Eagles football team represented Morehead State University as a member of the Ohio Valley Conference (OVC) during the 1986 NCAA Division I-AA football season. Led by third-year head coach Bill Baldridge, the Eagles compiled an overall record of 7–4, with a mark of 3–4 in conference play, and finished tied for fifth in the OVC.

== Schedule ==
Date	Opponent	Rank	Site	Result	Attendance	Source
September 7	at Marshall*		Fairfield Stadium; Huntington, WV	W 19–10	15,542	
September 13	James Madison*		Jayne Stadium; Morehead, KY	W 27–24	4,300	
September 20	at Wichita State*		Cessna Stadium; Wichita, KS	W 36–35	13,252	
September 27	Kentucky State*	No. 9	Jayne Stadium; Morehead, KY	W 33–10	6,500	
October 11	Austin Peay	No. 4	Jayne Stadium; Morehead, KY	W 27–10	8,000	
October 18	at Tennessee Tech	No. 3	Tucker Stadium; Cookeville, TN	W 28–20	6,036	
October 25	at Akron	No. 2	Rubber Bowl; Akron, OH	L 7–30	9,532	
November 1	Murray State	No. T–12	Jayne Stadium; Morehead, KY	L 11–45		
November 8	at Middle Tennessee		Johnny "Red" Floyd Stadium; Murfreesboro, TN	L 7–24	2,800	
November 15	Youngstown State		Jayne Stadium; Morehead, KY	W 27–24	6,500	
November 22	at No. 12 Eastern Kentucky		Hanger Field; Richmond, KY (rivalry)	L 6–23		
*Non-conference game; Rankings from NCAA Division I-AA Football Committee Poll released prior to the game
