= 1986 Illinois State Redbirds football team =

American college football season

1986 Illinois State Redbirds football
- Conference: Gateway Collegiate Athletic Conference
- Record: 5–5 (3–3 GCAC)
- Head coach: Bob Otolski (6th season)
- Home stadium: Hancock Stadium

1986 Gateway Collegiate Athletic Conference football standings
	Conf.					Overall
Team	W		L		T	W		L		T
No. 3 Eastern Illinois $^	5	–	1	–	0	11	–	2	–	0
No. 17 Southern Illinois	4	–	2	–	0	7	–	4	–	0
Northern Iowa	4	–	2	–	0	7	–	3	–	1
Illinois State	3	–	3	–	0	5	–	5	–	0
Western Illinois	2	–	4	–	0	6	–	5	–	0
SW Missouri State	1	–	5	–	0	3	–	7	–	0
Indiana State	1	–	5	–	0	3	–	8	–	0
$ – Conference champion; ^ – NCAA Division I-AA playoff participant; Rankings from NCAA Division I-AA Football Committee poll

The 1986 Illinois State Redbirds football team represented Illinois State University as a member of the Gateway Collegiate Athletic Conference (GCAC) during the 1986 NCAA Division I-AA football season. In their sixth year under head coach Bob Otolski, the Redbirds compiled an overall record of 5–5, with a mark of 3–3 in conference play, and placed fourth in the GCAC. Illinois State played home games at Hancock Stadium in Normal, Illinois.

== Schedule ==
Date	Opponent	Site	Result	Attendance	Source
August 30	Eastern Illinois	Hancock Stadium; Normal, IL (rivalry)	W 23–20	6,965	
September 6	Southwest Missouri State	Hancock Stadium; Normal, IL	L 16–17	6,458	
September 20	Wayne State (MI)*	Hancock Stadium; Normal, IL	L 13–17		
September 27	at Oklahoma State*	Lewis Field; Stillwater, OK	L 7–23	38,600	
October 4	at Western Illinois	Hanson Field; Macomb, IL	W 17–7	12,136	
October 18	Indiana State	Memorial Stadium; Terre Haute, IN	W 38–28		
October 25	Southern Illinois	Hancock Stadium; Normal, IL	L 3–20	10,346	
November 8	at Wichita State*	Cessna Stadium; Wichita, KS	W 17–10	4,233	
November 15	Northwest Missouri State*	Hancock Stadium; Normal, IL	W 35–14	5,714	
November 22	at Northern Iowa	UNI-Dome; Cedar Falls, IA	L 13–22	7,452	
*Non-conference game
