= 1986 Akron Zips football team =

American college football season

1986 Akron Zips football
- Conference: Ohio Valley Conference
- Record: 7–4 (4–3 OVC)
- Head coach: Gerry Faust (1st season)
- Home stadium: Rubber Bowl

1986 Ohio Valley Conference football standings
	Conf.					Overall
Team	W		L		T	W		L		T
No. 10 Eastern Kentucky ^	6	–	1	–	0	10	–	3	–	1
No. 18 Murray State $^	6	–	1	–	0	7	–	4	–	1
Akron	4	–	3	–	0	7	–	4	–	0
Middle Tennessee	4	–	3	–	0	6	–	5	–	0
Morehead State	3	–	4	–	0	7	–	4	–	0
Austin Peay	3	–	4	–	0	5	–	6	–	0
Youngstown State	2	–	5	–	0	2	–	9	–	0
Tennessee Tech	0	–	7	–	0	0	–	10	–	0
$ – Conference champion; ^ – NCAA Division I-AA playoff participant; Rankings from NCAA Division I-AA Football Committee poll

The 1986 Akron Zips football team represented Akron University in the 1986 NCAA Division I-AA football season as members of the Ohio Valley Conference. They were led by first-year head coach Gerry Faust. The Zips played their home games at the Rubber Bowl in Akron, Ohio. They finished the season with a record of 7–4 overall and 4–3 in OVC play to tie for third place.

== Schedule ==
Date	Opponent	Site	Result	Attendance	Source
September 6	Salem*	Rubber Bowl; Akron, OH	W 35–0	35,202	
September 13	at Kent State*	Dix Stadium; Kent, OH (Wagon Wheel)	W 17–7	19,000	
September 20	at Eastern Michigan*	Rynearson Stadium; Ypsilanti, MI	L 21–24	14,716	
September 27	UCF*	Rubber Bowl; Akron, OH	W 20–17	12,186	
October 11	at Middle Tennessee	Johnny "Red" Floyd Stadium; Murfreesboro, TN	L 12–24	10,500	
October 18	Murray State	Rubber Bowl; Akron, OH	W 24–13		
October 25	No. 2 Morehead State	Rubber Bowl; Akron, OH	W 30–7	9,532	
November 1	at Tennessee Tech	Tucker Stadium; Cookeville, TN	W 38–13	10,229	
November 8	Austin Peay	Rubber Bowl; Akron, OH	W 31–16		
November 15	No. 14 Eastern Kentucky	Rubber Bowl; Akron, OH	L 24–27		
November 22	at Youngstown State	Stambaugh Stadium; Youngstown, OH (Steel Tire)	L 39–40	8,143	
*Non-conference game; Rankings from NCAA Division I-AA Football Committee Poll released prior to the game
