= 1986 Murray State Racers football team =

American college football season

1986 Murray State Racers football

OVC co-champion

NCAA Division I-AA First Round, L 21–28 at Eastern Illinois
- Conference: Ohio Valley Conference
- Record: 7–4–1 (6–1 OVC)
- Head coach: Frank Beamer (6th season)
- Defensive coordinator: Mike Mahoney (6th season)
- Home stadium: Roy Stewart Stadium

1986 Ohio Valley Conference football standings
	Conf.					Overall
Team	W		L		T	W		L		T
No. 10 Eastern Kentucky ^	6	–	1	–	0	10	–	3	–	1
No. 18 Murray State $^	6	–	1	–	0	7	–	4	–	1
Akron	4	–	3	–	0	7	–	4	–	0
Middle Tennessee	4	–	3	–	0	6	–	5	–	0
Morehead State	3	–	4	–	0	7	–	4	–	0
Austin Peay	3	–	4	–	0	5	–	6	–	0
Youngstown State	2	–	5	–	0	2	–	9	–	0
Tennessee Tech	0	–	7	–	0	0	–	10	–	0
$ – Conference champion; ^ – NCAA Division I-AA playoff participant; Rankings from NCAA Division I-AA Football Committee poll

The 1986 Murray State Racers football team represented Murray State University as a member of the Ohio Valley Conference (OVC) during the 1986 NCAA Division I-AA football season. Led by sixth-year head coach Frank Beamer, the Racers compiled an overall record of 7–4–1 with a mark of 6–1 in conference play, and sharing the OVC title with Eastern Kentucky. Murray State advanced to the NCAA Division I-AA Championship playoffs, where the Racers lost to Eastern Illinois in the first round.

== Schedule ==
Date	Opponent	Rank	Site	Result	Attendance	Source
September 6	at Southeast Missouri State*		Houck Stadium; Cape Girardeau, MO	W 42–17		
September 13	Southern Illinois*	No. 20	Roy Stewart Stadium; Murray, KY	L 0–31	8,500	
September 27	Western Kentucky*		Roy Stewart Stadium; Murray, KY (rivalry)	T 10–10	8,875	
October 4	at UCF*		Florida Citrus Bowl; Orlando, FL	L 25–38	13,086	
October 11	Eastern Kentucky		Roy Stewart Stadium; Murray, KY	W 17–15	7,116	
October 16	at Akron		Rubber Bowl; Akron, OH	L 13–24		
October 25	Tennessee Tech		Roy Stewart Stadium; Murray, KY	W 23–16	7,281	
November 1	at Morehead State		Jayne Stadium; Morehead, KY	W 45–11		
November 8	Youngstown State		Roy Stewart Stadium; Murray, KY	W 17–14	2,582	
November 15	Middle Tennessee		Roy Stewart Stadium; Murray, KY	W 21–7	2,688	
November 22	at Austin Peay		Municipal Stadium; Clarksville, TN	W 24–14		
November 29	at No. 3 Eastern Illinois*	No. T–18	O'Brien Stadium; Charleston, IL (NCAA Division I-AA First Round)	L 21–28	4,500	
*Non-conference game; Rankings from NCAA Division I-AA Football Committee Poll released prior to the game
