= 1986 Middle Tennessee Blue Raiders football team =

American college football season

1986 Middle Tennessee Blue Raiders football
- Conference: Ohio Valley Conference
- Record: 6–5 (4–3 OVC)
- Head coach: Boots Donnelly (8th season)
- Home stadium: Johnny "Red" Floyd Stadium

1986 Ohio Valley Conference football standings
	Conf.					Overall
Team	W		L		T	W		L		T
No. 10 Eastern Kentucky ^	6	–	1	–	0	10	–	3	–	1
No. 18 Murray State $^	6	–	1	–	0	7	–	4	–	1
Akron	4	–	3	–	0	7	–	4	–	0
Middle Tennessee	4	–	3	–	0	6	–	5	–	0
Morehead State	3	–	4	–	0	7	–	4	–	0
Austin Peay	3	–	4	–	0	5	–	6	–	0
Youngstown State	2	–	5	–	0	2	–	9	–	0
Tennessee Tech	0	–	7	–	0	0	–	10	–	0
$ – Conference champion; ^ – NCAA Division I-AA playoff participant; Rankings from NCAA Division I-AA Football Committee poll

The 1986 Middle Tennessee Blue Raiders football team represented Middle Tennessee State University in the 1986 NCAA Division I-AA football season

== Schedule ==
Date	Opponent	Rank	Site	Result	Attendance	Source
August 30	Miles*	No. 4	Johnny "Red" Floyd Stadium; Murfreesboro, TN	W 47–0	6,500	
September 6	vs. Tennessee State*	No. 4	Vanderbilt Stadium; Nashville, TN	L 6–7	28,000	
September 20	No. 4 Georgia Southern*	No. 17	Johnny "Red" Floyd Stadium; Murfreesboro, TN	L 31–34	11,000	
September 27	at Eastern Kentucky		Hanger Field; Richmond, KY	L 3–28	10,100	
October 4	at Austin Peay		Clarksville Municipal Stadium; Clarksville, TN	L 0–7 ^{OT}	6,037	
October 11	Akron		Johnny "Red" Floyd Stadium; Murfreesboro, TN	W 24–12	10,500	
October 18	at Southwest Missouri State*		Briggs Stadium; Springfield, M0	W 42–19	3,000	
November 1	at Youngstown State		Stambaugh Stadium; Youngstown, OH	W 49–14	5,906	
November 8	Morehead State		Johnny "Red" Floyd Stadium; Murfreesboro, TN	W 24–7	2,800	
November 15	at Murray State		Roy Stewart Stadium; Murray, KY	L 7–21	2,688	
November 22	Tennessee Tech		Johnny "Red" Floyd Stadium; Murfreesboro, TN	W 21–6		
*Non-conference game; Rankings from NCAA Division I-AA Football Committee Poll released prior to the game

== After the season ==
=== NFL draft ===
The following Blue Raider was selected in the National Football League draft following the season.

Round	Pick	Player	Position	NFL club
12	324	Tony Burse	Running back	Seattle Seahawks
