= 1986 Eastern Kentucky Colonels football team =

American college football season

1986 Eastern Kentucky Colonels football

OVC co-champion

NCAA Division I-AA Semifinal, L 10–24 at Arkansas State
- Conference: Ohio Valley Conference
- Record: 10–3–1 (6–1 OVC)
- Head coach: Roy Kidd (23rd season)
- Home stadium: Hanger Field

1986 Ohio Valley Conference football standings
	Conf.					Overall
Team	W		L		T	W		L		T
No. 10 Eastern Kentucky ^	6	–	1	–	0	10	–	3	–	1
No. 18 Murray State $^	6	–	1	–	0	7	–	4	–	1
Akron	4	–	3	–	0	7	–	4	–	0
Middle Tennessee	4	–	3	–	0	6	–	5	–	0
Morehead State	3	–	4	–	0	7	–	4	–	0
Austin Peay	3	–	4	–	0	5	–	6	–	0
Youngstown State	2	–	5	–	0	2	–	9	–	0
Tennessee Tech	0	–	7	–	0	0	–	10	–	0
$ – Conference champion; ^ – NCAA Division I-AA playoff participant; Rankings from NCAA Division I-AA Football Committee poll

The 1986 Eastern Kentucky Colonels football team represented Eastern Kentucky University as a member of the Ohio Valley Conference (OVC) during the 1986 NCAA Division I-AA football season. Led by 23rd-year head coach Roy Kidd, the Colonels compiled an overall record of 10–3–1 with a mark of 6–1 in conference play, sharing the OVC title with Murray State. Eastern Kentucky advanced to the NCAA Division I-AA Championship playoffs, where Colonels defeated Furman in the first round and Eastern Illinois in the quarterfinals before losing to Arkansas State in the semifinals.

== Schedule ==
Date	Opponent	Rank	Site	Result	Attendance	Source
September 13	Chattanooga*	No. 13	Hanger Field; Richmond, KY	W 23–3	14,400	
September 20	at Marshall*	No. 11	Fairfield Stadium; Huntington, WV	T 13–13		
September 27	Middle Tennessee		Hanger Field; Richmond, KY	W 28–3	10,100	
October 4	at Western Kentucky*	No. 20	L. T. Smith Stadium; Bowling Green, KY (rivalry)	L 10–24	9,300	
October 11	at Murray State		Roy Stewart Stadium; Murray, KY	L 15–17	7,116	
October 18	No. 19 UCF*		Hanger Field; Richmond, KY	W 51–24	12,200	
October 25	Youngstown State		Hanger Field; Richmond, KY	W 38–17	16,300	
November 1	at Austin Peay		Municipal Stadium; Clarksville, TN	W 27–17		
November 8	Tennessee Tech	No. 18	Hanger Field; Richmond, KY	W 42–14		
November 15	at Akron	No. 14	Rubber Bowl; Akron, OH	W 27–24		
November 22	Morehead State	No. 12	Hanger Field; Richmond, KY (rivalry)	W 23–6		
November 29	at No. 15 Furman*	No. 10	Paladin Stadium; Greenville, SC (NCAA Division I-AA First Round)	W 23–10	9,121	
December 6	at No. 3 Eastern Illinois*	No. 10	O'Brien Stadium; Charleston, IL (NCAA Division I-AA Quarterfinal)	W 24–22	4,149	
December 13	at No. 2 Arkansas State*	No. 10	Indian Stadium; Jonesboro, AR (NCAA Division I-AA Semifinal)	L 19–24	10,500	
*Non-conference game; Rankings from NCAA Division I-AA Football Committee Poll released prior to the game
