= 1986 Tennessee Tech Golden Eagles football team =

American college football season

1986 Tennessee Tech Golden Eagles football
- Conference: Ohio Valley Conference
- Record: 0–10 (0–7 OVC)
- Head coach: Jim Ragland (1st season)
- Home stadium: Tucker Stadium

1986 Ohio Valley Conference football standings
	Conf.					Overall
Team	W		L		T	W		L		T
No. 10 Eastern Kentucky ^	6	–	1	–	0	10	–	3	–	1
No. 18 Murray State $^	6	–	1	–	0	7	–	4	–	1
Akron	4	–	3	–	0	7	–	4	–	0
Middle Tennessee	4	–	3	–	0	6	–	5	–	0
Morehead State	3	–	4	–	0	7	–	4	–	0
Austin Peay	3	–	4	–	0	5	–	6	–	0
Youngstown State	2	–	5	–	0	2	–	9	–	0
Tennessee Tech	0	–	7	–	0	0	–	10	–	0
$ – Conference champion; ^ – NCAA Division I-AA playoff participant; Rankings from NCAA Division I-AA Football Committee poll

The 1986 Tennessee Tech Golden Eagles football team represented Tennessee Technological University (commonly referred to as Tennessee Tech) as a member of the Ohio Valley Conference (OVC) during the 1986 NCAA Division I-AA football season. Led by first-year head coach Jim Ragland, the Golden Eagles compiled an overall record of 0–10, with a mark of 0–7 in conference play, and finished eighth in the OVC.

== Schedule ==
Date	Opponent	Site	Result	Attendance	Source
September 6	at Tulsa*	Skelly Stadium; Tulsa, OK	L 0–51	10,466	
September 20	at Chattanooga*	Chamberlain Field; Chattanooga, TN	L 3–33	9,487	
October 4	No. 4 Georgia Southern*	Tucker Stadium; Cookeville, TN	L 13–59	6,211	
October 11	at Youngstown State	Stambaugh Stadium; Youngstown, OH	L 6–30		
October 18	No. 3 Morehead State	Tucker Stadium; Cookeville, TN	L 20–28	6,036	
October 25	at Murray State	Roy Stewart Stadium; Murray, KY	L 16–23	7,281	
November 1	Akron	Tucker Stadium; Cookeville, TN	L 13–38	10,229	
November 8	at No. 18 Eastern Kentucky	Hanger Field; Richmond, KY	L 14–42		
November 15	Austin Peay	Tucker Stadium; Cookeville, TN	L 13–23		
November 22	at Middle Tennessee	Johnny "Red" Floyd Stadium; Murfreesboro, TN	L 6–21		
*Non-conference game; Rankings from NCAA Division I-AA Football Committee Poll released prior to the game
