= 1986 Youngstown State Penguins football team =

American college football season

1986 Youngstown State Penguins football
- Conference: Ohio Valley Conference
- Record: 2–9 (2–5 OVC)
- Head coach: Jim Tressel (1st season)
- Home stadium: Stambaugh Stadium

1986 Ohio Valley Conference football standings
	Conf.					Overall
Team	W		L		T	W		L		T
No. 10 Eastern Kentucky ^	6	–	1	–	0	10	–	3	–	1
No. 18 Murray State $^	6	–	1	–	0	7	–	4	–	1
Akron	4	–	3	–	0	7	–	4	–	0
Middle Tennessee	4	–	3	–	0	6	–	5	–	0
Morehead State	3	–	4	–	0	7	–	4	–	0
Austin Peay	3	–	4	–	0	5	–	6	–	0
Youngstown State	2	–	5	–	0	2	–	9	–	0
Tennessee Tech	0	–	7	–	0	0	–	10	–	0
$ – Conference champion; ^ – NCAA Division I-AA playoff participant; Rankings from NCAA Division I-AA Football Committee poll

The 1986 Youngstown State Penguins football team represented Youngstown State University during the 1986 NCAA Division I-AA football season as a member of the Ohio Valley Conference (OVC). Led by first-year head coach Jim Tressel, the Penguins compiled an overall record of 2–9 with a mark of 2–5 in conference play, and finished seventh in the OVC.

== Schedule ==
Date	Opponent	Site	Result	Attendance	Source
September 6	Nicholls State*	Stambaugh Stadium; Youngstown, OH	L 17–34		
September 13	Eastern Michigan*	Stambaugh Stadium; Youngstown, OH	L 17–18	8,507	
September 20	at Northeastern*	Parsons Field; Brookline, MA	L 21–23	1,200	
September 27	at Southern Illinois*	McAndrew Stadium; Carbondale, IL	L 17–24	15,100	
October 11	Tennessee Tech	Stambaugh Stadium; Youngstown, OH	W 30–6		
October 18	at Austin Peay	Municipal Stadium; Clarksville, TN	L 10–13		
October 25	at Eastern Kentucky	Hanger Field; Richmond, KY	L 17–38	16,300	
November 1	Middle Tennessee	Stambaugh Stadium; Youngstown, OH	L 14–49	5,906	
November 8	at Murray State	Roy Stewart Stadium; Murray, KY	L 14–17	2,582	
November 15	at Morehead State	Jayne Stadium; Morehead, KY	L 24–27	6,500	
November 22	Akron	Stambaugh Stadium; Youngstown, OH (rivalry)	W 40–39	8,143	
*Non-conference game
