= National Campus Basketball Tournament =

The National Campus Basketball Tournament was a college basketball postseason tournament hosted by Bradley University in 1951. After the point-shaving scandals over the previous year, some schools preferred that major tournaments be held at campus sites, rather than major neutral-site arenas such as Madison Square Garden, which was hosting the Final Four of both the NCAA and NIT tournaments at that time. Initially, 25 teams were invited by Bradley to apply for entry into a new postseason event that they would host. The field was ultimately whittled down to eight teams and began play with a doubleheader on March 27. The tournament was only held once and was won by Syracuse.

Quarter-finals
March 27, 28
Wyoming	78
Duquesne	61
Bradley	75
Western Kentucky	71
Syracuse	69
Toledo	52
Utah	67
Villanova	65

Semi-finals
March 30
Wyoming	63
Bradley	77
Syracuse	74
Utah	57

Final
March 31
Bradley	75
Syracuse	76
Third place
Utah	55
Wyoming	52
