= Gateway Collegiate Athletic Conference =

- Association: NCAA
- Founded: 1982; 44 years ago
- Folded: 1992; 34 years ago
- Commissioner: Patty Viverito
- Division: Division I
- No. of teams: 10
- Region: Midwest

The Gateway Collegiate Athletic Conference was a women's-only college athletic conference which operated in the midwestern United States from its inception in 1982 to its absorption by the Missouri Valley Conference in 1992.

== History ==
The Gateway Collegiate Athletic Conference was founded in August 1982 as a women's-only conference. The charter members consisted of Bradley University, Drake University, Eastern Illinois University, Illinois State University, Indiana State University, the University of Northern Iowa, Southern Illinois University, Southwest Missouri State University, Western Illinois University and Wichita State University.

In 1985, the Gateway added football (its only men's-sponsoring sport) with Eastern Illinois, Illinois State, Northern Iowa, Southern Illinois, Southwest Missouri State and Western Illinois as the charter members. Indiana State joined the league for that sport in the following year. For football, Eastern Illinois, Western Illinois, Northern Iowa and Southwest Missouri State previously competed in the Mid-Continent Conference, while Illinois State and Southern Illinois previously competed in the then-NCAA Division I-A Missouri Valley Conference, and Indiana State previously competed as an NCAA Division I-AA independent.

In 1992, the Gateway Collegiate Athletic Conference was merged into the Missouri Valley Conference. The league's football side was spun off into the standalone Gateway Football Conference, known since 2008 as the Missouri Valley Football Conference. The MVFC and MVC, although separate leagues, now share five members and operate out of the same offices in St. Louis.

== Members ==
=== Charter/final members ===
Institution	Location	Founded	Type	Enrollment	Nickname	Joined (Note: Represents the calendar year when fall sports competition begins.)	Left (Note: Represents the calendar year when spring sports competition ends.)	Men's primary conference during tenure in Gateway	New men's primary conference after Gateway dissolution	Current primary conference
Bradley University	Peoria, Illinois	1897	Nonsectarian	6,100	Braves	1982	1992	Missouri Valley (MVC)		
Drake University	Des Moines, Iowa	1881	Nonsectarian	5,200	Bulldogs	1982	1992	Missouri Valley (MVC)		
Eastern Illinois University	Charleston, Illinois	1895	Public	11,651	Panthers	1982	1992	Mid-Continent (Mid-Con) (Note: The Mid-Continent Conference adopted its current name of The Summit League in 2007.)		Ohio Valley (OVC)
Illinois State University	Normal, Illinois	1857	Public	20,800	Redbirds	1982	1992	Missouri Valley (MVC)		
Indiana State University	Terre Haute, Indiana	1865	Public	12,144	Sycamores	1982	1992	Missouri Valley (MVC)		
University of Northern Iowa	Cedar Falls, Iowa	1876	Public	13,080	Panthers	1982	1992	Mid-Continent (Mid-Con)	Missouri Valley (MVC)	
Southern Illinois University	Carbondale, Illinois	1869	Public	18,847	Salukis	1982	1992	Missouri Valley (MVC)		
Southwest Missouri State University (Note: Southwest Missouri State University adopted its current name of Missouri State University in 2005.)	Springfield, Missouri	1905	Public	21,059	Bears & Lady Bears (Note: The Missouri State women's beach volleyball team, which did not exist in the Gateway era, is nicknamed "Beach Bears" instead of "Lady Bears".)	1982	1992	Mid-Continent (Mid-Con)	Missouri Valley (MVC)	Conf. USA (CUSA)
Western Illinois University	Macomb, Illinois	1895	Public	13,602	Leathernecks & Westerwinds (Note: Western Illinois did not adopt the nickname of "Leathernecks" for women's sports teams until 2009.)	1982	1992	Summit (Note: When Western Illinois joined, the conference now known as The Summit League was known as the Mid-Continent Conference.)		Ohio Valley (OVC)
Wichita State University	Wichita, Kansas	1895	Public	14,806	Shockers	1982	1992	Missouri Valley (MVC)		The American

=== Membership timeline ===
Full member (all sports) Full member (non-football) Associate member (football) Associate member (sport) Other Conference Other Conference

== List of champions ==
Season	Regular Season Champion	Tournament Champion
1981-82		
1982-83		Illinois State
1983-84	Drake	
1984-85	Illinois State	
1985-86	Southern Illinois	
1986-87	Southern Illinois	Southern Illinois
1987-88	Eastern Illinois, Illinois State, Indiana State	Eastern Illinois
1988-89	Illinois State	Illinois State
1989-90	Southern Illinois	Southern Illinois
1990-91	Missouri State	Missouri State
1991-92	Missouri State	Missouri State

== See also ==
- Missouri Valley Conference
- Missouri Valley Football Conference
- Summit League
