= 1984 Jackson State Tigers football team =

American college football season

1984 Jackson State Tigers football
- Conference: Southwestern Athletic Conference
- Record: 4–5–1 (3–4 SWAC)
- Head coach: W. C. Gorden (9th season)
- Home stadium: Mississippi Veterans Memorial Stadium

1984 Southwestern Athletic Conference football standings
	Conf.					Overall
Team	W		L		T	W		L		T
No. 1 Alcorn State $^	7	–	0	–	0	9	–	1	–	0
No. 6 Mississippi Valley State ^	6	–	1	–	0	9	–	2	–	0
Grambling State	5	–	2	–	0	7	–	4	–	0
Southern	4	–	3	–	0	6	–	5	–	0
Jackson State	3	–	4	–	0	4	–	5	–	1
Texas Southern	2	–	5	–	0	5	–	6	–	0
Alabama State	1	–	6	–	0	2	–	9	–	0
Prairie View A&M	0	–	7	–	0	0	–	11	–	0
$ – Conference champion; ^ – NCAA Division I-AA playoff participant; Rankings from NCAA Division I-AA Football Committee poll

The 1984 Jackson State Tigers football team represented Jackson State University as a member of the Southwestern Athletic Conference (SWAC) during the 1984 NCAA Division I-AA football season. Led by ninth-year head coach W. C. Gorden, the Tigers compiled an overall record of 4–5–1 and a mark of 3–4 in conference play, and finished fifth in the SWAC.

== Schedule ==
Date	Opponent	Site	Result	Attendance	Source
September 1	at Alabama State	Cramton Bowl; Montgomery, AL	W 23–7		
September 8	vs. Tennessee State*	Liberty Bowl Memorial Stadium; Memphis, TN (rivalry)	L 14–34	40,000	
September 15	Prairie View A&M	Mississippi Veterans Memorial Stadium; Jackson, MS	W 34–14		
September 22	No. T–18 Mississippi Valley State	Mississippi Veterans Memorial Stadium; Jackson, MS	L 32–49	50,337	
October 6	Florida A&M*	Mississippi Veterans Memorial Stadium; Jackson, MS	T 10–10		
October 13	at Southern	A. W. Mumford Stadium; Baton Rouge, LA (rivalry)	L 28–34		
October 20	at Grambling State	Eddie G. Robinson Memorial Stadium; Grambling, LA	L 3–19	6,000	
October 27	at Morgan State*	Hughes Stadium; Baltimore, MD	W 28–14		
November 3	Texas Southern	Mississippi Veterans Memorial Stadium; Jackson, MS	W 47–0		
November 17	at No. 2 Alcorn State	Henderson Stadium; Lorman, MS (rivalry)	L 13–17		
*Non-conference game; Rankings from NCAA Division I-AA Football Committee Poll released prior to the game
