= 1985 Alcorn State Braves football team =

American college football season

1985 Alcorn State Braves football
- Conference: Southwestern Athletic Conference
- Record: 7–3 (5–2 SWAC)
- Head coach: Marino Casem (22nd season)
- Defensive coordinator: Dennis Thomas (5th season)
- Home stadium: Henderson Stadium

1985 Southwestern Athletic Conference football standings
	Conf.					Overall
Team	W		L		T	W		L		T
No. 8 Grambling State +^	6	–	1	–	0	9	–	3	–	0
No. 15 Jackson State +^	6	–	1	–	0	8	–	3	–	0
Mississippi Valley State	5	–	2	–	0	8	–	3	–	0
No. 20 Alcorn State	5	–	2	–	0	7	–	3	–	0
Southern	3	–	4	–	0	6	–	5	–	0
Alabama State	2	–	5	–	0	3	–	8	–	0
Texas Southern	1	–	6	–	0	1	–	10	–	0
Prairie View A&M	0	–	7	–	0	2	–	9	–	0
+ – Conference co-champions; ^ – NCAA Division I-AA playoff participant; Rankings from NCAA Division I-AA Football Committee poll

The 1985 Alcorn State Braves football team represented Alcorn State University as a member of the Southwestern Athletic Conference (SWAC) during the 1985 NCAA Division I-AA football season. Led by 22nd-year head coach Marino Casem, the Braves compiled an overall record of 7–3, with a conference record of 5–2, and finished tied for third in the SWAC.

== Schedule ==
Date	Opponent	Rank	Site	Result	Attendance	Source
September 14	vs. Grambling State		Independence Stadium; Shreveport, LA (Red River Classic)	L 20–30	30,000	
September 21	at Alabama State		Cramton Bowl; Montgomery, AL	W 30–14		
September 28	at Stephen F. Austin*		Lumberjack Stadium; Nacogdoches, TX	L 12–42		
October 5	South Carolina State*		Henderson Stadium; Lorman, MS	W 39–24	7,438	
October 12	at Texas Southern		Robertson Stadium; Houston, TX	W 36–13		
October 26	at Southern		A. W. Mumford Stadium; Baton Rouge, LA	W 23–13		
November 2	Florida A&M*		Henderson Stadium; Lorman, MS	W 28–7	5,645	
November 9	vs. No. 7 Mississippi Valley State		Mississippi Veterans Memorial Stadium; Jackson, MS	W 35–28	42,100	
November 16	Prairie View A&M	No. T–18	Henderson Stadium; Lorman, MS	W 41–7	1,450	
November 24	at No. 14 Jackson State	No. 15	Mississippi Veterans Memorial Stadium; Jackson, MS (Soul Bowl)	L 20–31	34,019	
*Non-conference game; Rankings from NCAA Division I-AA Football Committee Poll released prior to the game
