= 1985 Jackson State Tigers football team =

American college football season

1985 Jackson State Tigers football

Black college national champion SWAC co-champion

NCAA Division I-AA First Round, L 0–27 vs. Georgia Southern
- Conference: Southwestern Athletic Conference
- Record: 8–3 (6–1 SWAC)
- Head coach: W. C. Gorden (10th season)
- Home stadium: Mississippi Veterans Memorial Stadium

1985 Southwestern Athletic Conference football standings
| | Conf. | | | | | Overall |
| Team | W | | L | | T | W | | L | | T |
|---|---|---|---|---|---|---|---|---|---|---|
| No. 8 Grambling State +^ | 6 | – | 1 | – | 0 | 9 | – | 3 | – | 0 |
| No. 15 Jackson State +^ | 6 | – | 1 | – | 0 | 8 | – | 3 | – | 0 |
| Mississippi Valley State | 5 | – | 2 | – | 0 | 8 | – | 3 | – | 0 |
| No. 20 Alcorn State | 5 | – | 2 | – | 0 | 7 | – | 3 | – | 0 |
| Southern | 3 | – | 4 | – | 0 | 6 | – | 5 | – | 0 |
| Alabama State | 2 | – | 5 | – | 0 | 3 | – | 8 | – | 0 |
| Texas Southern | 1 | – | 6 | – | 0 | 1 | – | 10 | – | 0 |
| Prairie View A&M | 0 | – | 7 | – | 0 | 2 | – | 9 | – | 0 |
+ – Conference co-champions; ^ – NCAA Division I-AA playoff participant; Rankings from NCAA Division I-AA Football Committee poll

The 1985 Jackson State Tigers football team represented Jackson State University as a member of the Southwestern Athletic Conference (SWAC) during the 1985 NCAA Division I-AA football season. Led by 10th-year head coach W. C. Gorden, the Tigers compiled an overall record of 8–3 and a mark of 6–1 in conference play, and finished as SWAC co-champion. Jackson State finished their season with a loss against Georgia Southern in the Division I-AA playoffs. At the conclusion of the season, the Tigers were also recognized as co-black college national champion, along with the Hampton Pirates.

== Schedule ==
| Date | Opponent | Rank | Site | Result | Attendance | Source |
|---|---|---|---|---|---|---|
| September 7 | Alabama State | | Mississippi Veterans Memorial Stadium; Jackson, MS | W 28–14 | 19,486 | |
| September 14 | Tennessee State* | | Mississippi Veterans Memorial Stadium; Jackson, MS | L 31–44 | 25,417 | |
| September 21 | at Prairie View A&M | | Edward L. Blackshear Field; Prairie View, TX | W 21–3 | 5,120 | |
| September 28 | Mississippi Valley State | | Mississippi Veterans Memorial Stadium; Jackson, MS | L 14–35 | 56,978 | |
| October 12 | at Florida A&M* | | Bragg Memorial Stadium; Tallahassee, FL | W 28–23 | 7,283 | |
| October 19 | Southern | | Mississippi Veterans Memorial Stadium; Jackson, MS | W 27–9 | 39,000 | |
| October 26 | No. 2 Grambling State | | Mississippi Veterans Memorial Stadium; Jackson, MS | W 35–26 | 21,765 | |
| November 2 | Morgan State* | | Mississippi Veterans Memorial Stadium; Jackson, MS | W 42–6 | 3,100 | |
| November 9 | at Texas Southern | | Robertson Stadium; Houston, TX | W 28–7 | 8,500 | |
| November 24 | No. 15 Alcorn State | No. 14 | Mississippi Veterans Memorial Stadium; Jackson, MS (Soul Bowl) | W 31–20 | 34,019 | |
| November 30 | at No. 9 Georgia Southern* | No. 15 | Paulson Stadium; Statesboro, GA (NCAA Division I-AA First Round) | L 0–27 | 4,128 | |
*Non-conference game; Rankings from NCAA Division I-AA Football Committee Poll released prior to the game
