= 1983 Mississippi Valley State Delta Devils football team =

American college football season

1983 Mississippi Valley State Delta Devils football
- Conference: Southwestern Athletic Conference
- Record: 7–2–1 (4–2–1 SWAC)
- Head coach: Archie Cooley (4th season)
- Home stadium: Magnolia Stadium

1983 Southwestern Athletic Conference football standings
	Conf.					Overall
Team	W		L		T	W		L		T
No. 10 Grambling State $	6	–	0	–	1	8	–	1	–	2
No. 15 Jackson State	5	–	2	–	0	8	–	3	–	0
Southern	5	–	2	–	0	7	–	4	–	0
No. 19 Mississippi Valley State	4	–	2	–	1	7	–	2	–	1
Alcorn State	4	–	3	–	0	7	–	3	–	0
Texas Southern	2	–	5	–	0	4	–	6	–	0
Alabama State	0	–	6	–	0	2	–	9	–	0
Prairie View A&M	0	–	6	–	0	0	–	11	–	0
$ – Conference champion; Rankings from NCAA Division I-AA Football Committee poll

The 1983 Mississippi Valley State Delta Devils football team represented Mississippi Valley State University as a member of the Southwestern Athletic Conference (SWAC) during the 1983 NCAA Division I-AA football season. Led by fourth-year head coach Archie Cooley, the Delta Devils compiled an overall record of 7–2–1, with a conference record of 4–2–1, and finished fourth in the SWAC.

== Schedule ==
Date	Opponent	Site	Result	Attendance	Source
September 10	at Morris Brown*	Herndon Stadium; Atlanta, GA	W 49–7		
September 17	Arkansas–Pine Bluff*	Magnolia Stadium; Itta Bena, MS	W 63–0		
September 24	at No. 6 Jackson State	Mississippi Veterans Memorial Stadium; Jackson, MS	L 19–33		
October 2	Southern	Magnolia Stadium; Itta Bena, MS	L 28–31		
October 8	at Alabama State	Cramton Bowl; Montgomery, AL	W 28–27		
October 15	at No. 20 Grambling State	Eddie G. Robinson Memorial Stadium; Grambling, LA	T 28–28		
October 22	Texas Southern	Magnolia Stadium; Itta Bena, MS	W 30–21		
October 29	at Prairie View A&M	Edward L. Blackshear Field; Prairie View, TX	W 54–12		
November 5	at Alcorn State	Henderson Stadium; Lorman, MS	W 42–14		
November 12	vs. No. 12 Tennessee State*	Liberty Bowl Memorial Stadium; Memphis, TN (Bluff City Classic)	W 51–38	15,000	
*Non-conference game; Rankings from NCAA Division I-AA Football Committee Poll released prior to the game
