= 1983 Alcorn State Braves football team =

American college football season

1983 Alcorn State Braves football
- Conference: Southwestern Athletic Conference
- Record: 7–3 (4–3 SWAC)
- Head coach: Marino Casem (20th season)
- Home stadium: Henderson Stadium

1983 Southwestern Athletic Conference football standings
	Conf.					Overall
Team	W		L		T	W		L		T
No. 10 Grambling State $	6	–	0	–	1	8	–	1	–	2
No. 15 Jackson State	5	–	2	–	0	8	–	3	–	0
Southern	5	–	2	–	0	7	–	4	–	0
No. 19 Mississippi Valley State	4	–	2	–	1	7	–	2	–	1
Alcorn State	4	–	3	–	0	7	–	3	–	0
Texas Southern	2	–	5	–	0	4	–	6	–	0
Alabama State	0	–	6	–	0	2	–	9	–	0
Prairie View A&M	0	–	6	–	0	0	–	11	–	0
$ – Conference champion; Rankings from NCAA Division I-AA Football Committee poll

The 1983 Alcorn State Braves football team represented Alcorn State University as a member of the Southwestern Athletic Conference (SWAC) during the 1983 NCAA Division I-AA football season. Led by 20th-year head coach Marino Casem, the Braves compiled an overall record of 7–3, with a conference record of 4–3, and finished fifth in the SWAC.

== Schedule ==
Date	Opponent	Site	Result	Source
September 3	at Grambling State	Eddie G. Robinson Memorial Stadium; Grambling, LA	L 0–28	
September 17	vs. Alabama State	Ladd Stadium; Mobile, AL (Gulf Coast Classic)	W 13–10	
October 1	No. 1 South Carolina State*	Henderson Stadium; Lorman, MS	W 18–13	
October 8	at Texas Southern	Robertson Stadium; Houston, TX	W 27–13	
October 15	Northwestern State*	Mississippi Veterans Memorial Stadium; Jackson, MS	W 24–20	
October 22	at Southern	A. W. Mumford Stadium; Baton Rouge, LA	L 19–20	
October 29	Florida A&M*	Henderson Stadium; Lorman, MS	W 43–30	
November 5	Mississippi Valley State	Henderson Stadium; Lorman, MS	L 14–42	
November 12	Prairie View A&M	Henderson Stadium; Lorman, MS	W 38–6	
November 19	at No. 9 Jackson State	Mississippi Veterans Memorial Stadium; Jackson, MS (rivalry)	W 24–17	
*Non-conference game; Rankings from NCAA Division I-AA Football Committee Poll released prior to the game
