= 1984 Alcorn State Braves football team =

American college football season

1984 Alcorn State Braves football

Black college national champion SWAC champion

NCAA Division I-AA Quarterfinal, L 21–44 vs. Louisiana Tech
- Conference: Southwestern Athletic Conference
- Record: 9–1 (7–0 SWAC)
- Head coach: Marino Casem (21st season)
- Defensive coordinator: Dennis Thomas (4th season)
- Home stadium: Henderson Stadium

1984 Southwestern Athletic Conference football standings
	Conf.					Overall
Team	W		L		T	W		L		T
No. 1 Alcorn State $^	7	–	0	–	0	9	–	1	–	0
No. 6 Mississippi Valley State ^	6	–	1	–	0	9	–	2	–	0
Grambling State	5	–	2	–	0	7	–	4	–	0
Southern	4	–	3	–	0	6	–	5	–	0
Jackson State	3	–	4	–	0	4	–	5	–	1
Texas Southern	2	–	5	–	0	5	–	6	–	0
Alabama State	1	–	6	–	0	2	–	9	–	0
Prairie View A&M	0	–	7	–	0	0	–	11	–	0
$ – Conference champion; ^ – NCAA Division I-AA playoff participant; Rankings from NCAA Division I-AA Football Committee poll

The 1984 Alcorn State Braves football team represented Alcorn State University as a member of the Southwestern Athletic Conference (SWAC) during the 1984 NCAA Division I-AA football season. Led by 21st-year head coach Marino Casem, the Braves compiled an overall record of 9–1, with a mark of 7–0 in conference, and finished as SWAC champion. At the conclusion of the season, the Tigers were also recognized as black college national champion.

== Schedule ==
Date	Opponent	Rank	Site	Result	Attendance	Source
September 2	vs. Grambling State		Louisiana Superdome; New Orleans, LA	W 27–13	13,676	
September 15	Alabama State		Henderson Stadium; Lorman, MS	W 52–0		
September 29	at South Carolina State*	No. 10	State College Stadium; Orangeburg, SC	W 41–6		
October 6	Texas Southern	No. 7	Henderson Stadium; Lorman, MS	W 45–16		
October 20	Southern	No. 4	Henderson Stadium; Lorman, MS	W 44–15		
October 27	vs. Florida A&M*	No. 4	Tampa Stadium; Tampa, FL (Orange Blossom Classic)	W 51–14	11,600	
November 3	vs. No. 5 Mississippi Valley State	No. 4	Mississippi Veterans Memorial Stadium; Jackson, MS	W 42–28	63,808	
November 10	at Prairie View A&M	No. 3	Edward L. Blackshear Field; Prairie View, TX	W 35–12		
November 17	Jackson State	No. 2	Henderson Stadium; Lorman, MS (rivalry)	W 17–13		
December 1	No. 9 Louisiana Tech*	No. 1	Mississippi Veterans Memorial Stadium; Jackson, MS (NCAA Division I-AA Quarterfinal)	L 21–44	16,204	
*Non-conference game; Rankings from NCAA Division I-AA Football Committee Poll released prior to the game
