= 1985 Alabama State Hornets football team =

American college football season

1985 Alabama State Hornets football
- Conference: Southwestern Athletic Conference
- Record: 3–8 (2–5 SWAC)
- Head coach: Ron Mitchell (1st season)
- Home stadium: Cramton Bowl

1985 Southwestern Athletic Conference football standings
	Conf.					Overall
Team	W		L		T	W		L		T
No. 8 Grambling State +^	6	–	1	–	0	9	–	3	–	0
No. 15 Jackson State +^	6	–	1	–	0	8	–	3	–	0
Mississippi Valley State	5	–	2	–	0	8	–	3	–	0
No. 20 Alcorn State	5	–	2	–	0	7	–	3	–	0
Southern	3	–	4	–	0	6	–	5	–	0
Alabama State	2	–	5	–	0	3	–	8	–	0
Texas Southern	1	–	6	–	0	1	–	10	–	0
Prairie View A&M	0	–	7	–	0	2	–	9	–	0
+ – Conference co-champions; ^ – NCAA Division I-AA playoff participant; Rankings from NCAA Division I-AA Football Committee poll

The 1985 Alabama State Hornets football team represented Alabama State University as a member of the Southwestern Athletic Conference (SWAC) during the 1985 NCAA Division I-AA football season. Led by first-year head coach Ron Mitchell, the Hornets compiled an overall record of 3–8, with a mark of 2–5 in conference play, and finished sixth in the SWAC.

== Schedule ==
Date	Opponent	Site	Result	Attendance	Source
September 7	at Jackson State	Mississippi Veterans Memorial Stadium; Jackson, MS	L 14–28	19,486	
September 14	vs. Southern	Ladd Stadium; Mobile, AL (Gulf Coast Classic)	L 14–35		
September 21	Alcorn State	Cramton Bowl; Montgomery, AL	L 14–30		
September 28	at Texas Southern	Robertson Stadium; Houston, TX	W 24–14		
October 12	at Fort Valley State*	Wildcat Stadium; Fort Valley, GA	L 5–24	4,600	
October 19	Albany State*	Cramton Bowl; Montgomery, AL	L 8–24		
October 26	Prairie View A&M	Cramton Bowl; Montgomery, AL	W 17–10		
November 2	vs. Alabama A&M*	Legion Field; Birmingham, AL (Magic City Classic)	L 6–7		
November 9	vs. No. 4 Grambling State	Atlanta–Fulton County Stadium; Atlanta, GA (Atlanta Football Classic)	L 0–28	12,000	
November 16	Mississippi Valley State	Cramton Bowl; Montgomery, AL	L 6–55		
November 28	Tuskegee*	Cramton Bowl; Montgomery, AL (Turkey Day Classic)	W 21–0	12,000	
*Non-conference game; Rankings from NCAA Division I-AA Football Committee Poll released prior to the game
