= Tom Buckman =

American football player (born 1947)

No. 80
- Position: Tight end

Personal information
- Born: March 7, 1947 (age 79); Fort Worth, Texas, U.S.
- Listed height: 6 ft 4 in (1.93 m)
- Listed weight: 230 lb (104 kg)

Career information
- High school: Amon Carter Riverside (Fort Worth)
- College: Texas A&M (1965-1968)
- NFL draft: 1969: 12th round, 298th overall pick

Career history
- Denver Broncos (1969)

Career AFL statistics
- Receptions: 4
- Receiving yards: 48
- Touchdowns: 1
- Stats at Pro Football Reference

Tom Buckman (born Thomas Harry Buckman; March 7, 1947) is a former professional American football tight end.

== Career ==
Buckman played with the Denver Broncos of the American Football League during the 1969 AFL season. He had also previously been drafted by the Green Bay Packers in the twelfth round of the 1969 NFL/AFL draft.

He played at the collegiate level at Texas A&M University.
