= 1983 Jackson State Tigers football team =

American college football season

1983 Jackson State Tigers football
- Conference: Southwestern Athletic Conference
- Record: 8–3 (5–2 SWAC)
- Head coach: W. C. Gorden (8th season)
- Home stadium: Mississippi Veterans Memorial Stadium

1983 Southwestern Athletic Conference football standings
	Conf.					Overall
Team	W		L		T	W		L		T
No. 10 Grambling State $	6	–	0	–	1	8	–	1	–	2
No. 15 Jackson State	5	–	2	–	0	8	–	3	–	0
Southern	5	–	2	–	0	7	–	4	–	0
No. 19 Mississippi Valley State	4	–	2	–	1	7	–	2	–	1
Alcorn State	4	–	3	–	0	7	–	3	–	0
Texas Southern	2	–	5	–	0	4	–	6	–	0
Alabama State	0	–	6	–	0	2	–	9	–	0
Prairie View A&M	0	–	6	–	0	0	–	11	–	0
$ – Conference champion; Rankings from NCAA Division I-AA Football Committee poll

The 1983 Jackson State Tigers football team represented Jackson State University as a member of the Southwestern Athletic Conference (SWAC) during the 1983 NCAA Division I-AA football season. Led by eighth-year head coach W. C. Gorden, the Tigers compiled an overall record of 8–3 and a mark of 5–2 in conference play, and finished second in the SWAC.

== Schedule ==
Date	Opponent	Rank	Site	Result	Attendance	Source
September 3	Alabama State		Mississippi Veterans Memorial Stadium; Jackson, MS	W 21–0	18,344	
September 10	Tennessee State*		Mississippi Veterans Memorial Stadium; Jackson, MS (rivalry)	W 35–31		
September 17	at Prairie View A&M		Edward L. Blackshear Field; Prairie View, TX	W 50–0	4,000	
September 24	Mississippi Valley State	No. 6	Mississippi Veterans Memorial Stadium; Jackson, MS	W 33–19		
October 1	at No. 18 Nicholls State*	No. 4	John L. Guidry Stadium; Thibodaux, LA	W 27–20		
October 8	vs. Florida A&M*	No. 4	Gator Bowl Stadium; Jacksonville, FL (Bold City Classic)	W 28–22	20,331	
October 15	Southern	No. 3	Mississippi Veterans Memorial Stadium; Jackson, MS (rivalry)	W 31–0	57,376	
October 22	Grambling State	No. 3	Mississippi Veterans Memorial Stadium; Jackson, MS	L 10–14	30,952	
October 29	at Southeastern Louisiana*	No. 6	Strawberry Stadium; Hammond, LA	L 7–9		
November 5	at Texas Southern	No. 10	Robertson Stadium; Houston, TX	W 38–0		
November 19	Alcorn State	No. 9	Mississippi Veterans Memorial Stadium; Jackson, MS (rivalry)	L 17–24		
*Non-conference game; Rankings from NCAA Division I-AA Football Committee Poll released prior to the game
