= 1983 Grambling State Tigers football team =

American college football season

1983 Grambling State Tigers football

Black college national champion SWAC champion
- Conference: Southwestern Athletic Conference
- Record: 8–1–2 (6–0–1 SWAC)
- Head coach: Eddie Robinson (41st season)
- Home stadium: Eddie G. Robinson Memorial Stadium

1983 Southwestern Athletic Conference football standings
	Conf.					Overall
Team	W		L		T	W		L		T
No. 10 Grambling State $	6	–	0	–	1	8	–	1	–	2
No. 15 Jackson State	5	–	2	–	0	8	–	3	–	0
Southern	5	–	2	–	0	7	–	4	–	0
No. 19 Mississippi Valley State	4	–	2	–	1	7	–	2	–	1
Alcorn State	4	–	3	–	0	7	–	3	–	0
Texas Southern	2	–	5	–	0	4	–	6	–	0
Alabama State	0	–	6	–	0	2	–	9	–	0
Prairie View A&M	0	–	6	–	0	0	–	11	–	0
$ – Conference champion; Rankings from NCAA Division I-AA Football Committee poll

The 1983 Grambling State Tigers football team represented Grambling State University as a member of the Southwestern Athletic Conference (SWAC) during the 1983 NCAA Division I-AA football season. Led by 41st-year head coach Eddie Robinson, the Tigers compiled an overall record of 8–1–2 and a mark of 6–0–1 in conference play, and won the SWAC championship. The Tigers won a black college football national championship.

== Schedule ==
Date	Opponent	Rank	Site	Result	Attendance	Source
September 3	Alcorn State		Eddie G. Robinson Memorial Stadium; Grambling, LA	W 28–0		
September 10	vs. No. 15 (I-A) SMU*		Independence Stadium; Shreveport, LA (Red River Classic)	L 13–20	21,224	
September 17	vs. Morgan State*		Yankee Stadium; Bronx, NY	W 33–0	34,098	
October 1	Prairie View A&M	No. 17	Eddie G. Robinson Memorial Stadium; Grambling, LA (rivalry)	W 42–8		
October 8	at No. 8 Tennessee State*	No. T–14	Vanderbilt Stadium; Nashville, TN	T 7–7	40,000	
October 15	Mississippi Valley State	No. 20	Eddie G. Robinson Memorial Stadium; Grambling, LA	T 28–28		
October 22	at No. 3 Jackson State		Mississippi Veterans Memorial Stadium; Jackson, MS	W 14–10	30,952	
October 29	Texas Southern	No. 16	Eddie G. Robinson Memorial Stadium; Grambling, LA	W 55–0		
November 5	at Alabama State	No. 11	Cramton Bowl; Montgomery, AL	W 27–9		
November 12	No. 7 South Carolina State*	No. 13	Eddie G. Robinson Memorial Stadium; Grambling, LA	W 14–3	10,316	
November 26	vs. Southern	No. 10	Louisiana Superdome; New Orleans, LA (Bayou Classic)	W 24–10	58,199	
*Non-conference game; Rankings from NCAA Division I-AA Football Committee Poll released prior to the game
