= 1984 Texas Southern Tigers football team =

American college football season

1984 Texas Southern Tigers football
- Conference: Southwestern Athletic Conference
- Record: 5–6 (2–5 SWAC)
- Head coach: Lionel Taylor (1st season)
- Home stadium: Robertson Stadium; Rice Stadium

1984 Southwestern Athletic Conference football standings
	Conf.					Overall
Team	W		L		T	W		L		T
No. 1 Alcorn State $^	7	–	0	–	0	9	–	1	–	0
No. 6 Mississippi Valley State ^	6	–	1	–	0	9	–	2	–	0
Grambling State	5	–	2	–	0	7	–	4	–	0
Southern	4	–	3	–	0	6	–	5	–	0
Jackson State	3	–	4	–	0	4	–	5	–	1
Texas Southern	2	–	5	–	0	5	–	6	–	0
Alabama State	1	–	6	–	0	2	–	9	–	0
Prairie View A&M	0	–	7	–	0	0	–	11	–	0
$ – Conference champion; ^ – NCAA Division I-AA playoff participant; Rankings from NCAA Division I-AA Football Committee poll

The 1984 Texas Southern Tigers football team represented Texas Southern University as a member of the Southwestern Athletic Conference (SWAC) during the 1984 NCAA Division I-AA football season. Led by first-year head coach Lionel Taylor, the Tigers compiled an overall record of 5–6, with a mark of 2–5 in conference play, and finished sixth in the SWAC.

== Schedule ==
Date	Opponent	Site	Result	Attendance	Source
September 1	at Lamar*	Cardinal Stadium; Beaumont, TX	W 13–7		
September 8	at Morgan State*	Hughes Stadium; Baltimore, MD	W 31–14		
September 15	Southern	Robertson Stadium; Houston, TX	L 3–10		
September 22	vs. Alabama State	Ladd Stadium; Mobile, AL	W 33–20		
September 29	at Texas A&I*	Javelina Stadium; Kingsville, TX	L 13–17		
October 6	at No. 7 Alcorn State	Henderson Stadium; Lorman, MS	L 16–45		
October 13	Angelo State*	Robertson Stadium; Houston, TX	W 17–14		
October 20	No. 8 Mississippi Valley State	Robertson Stadium; Houston, TX	L 42–55		
October 27	Grambling State	Rice Stadium; Houston, TX	L 16–44	30,154	
November 3	at Jackson State	Mississippi Veterans Memorial Stadium; Jackson, MS	L 0–47		
November 17	Prairie View A&M	Rice Stadium; Houston, TX (rivalry)	W 51–0		
*Non-conference game; Rankings from NCAA Division I-AA Football Committee Poll released prior to the game
