= 1983 Alabama State Hornets football team =

American college football season

1983 Alabama State Hornets football
- Conference: Southwestern Athletic Conference
- Record: 2–9 (0–6 SWAC)
- Head coach: George James Jr. (8th season)
- Home stadium: Cramton Bowl

1983 Southwestern Athletic Conference football standings
	Conf.					Overall
Team	W		L		T	W		L		T
No. 10 Grambling State $	6	–	0	–	1	8	–	1	–	2
No. 15 Jackson State	5	–	2	–	0	8	–	3	–	0
Southern	5	–	2	–	0	7	–	4	–	0
No. 19 Mississippi Valley State	4	–	2	–	1	7	–	2	–	1
Alcorn State	4	–	3	–	0	7	–	3	–	0
Texas Southern	2	–	5	–	0	4	–	6	–	0
Alabama State	0	–	6	–	0	2	–	9	–	0
Prairie View A&M	0	–	6	–	0	0	–	11	–	0
$ – Conference champion; Rankings from NCAA Division I-AA Football Committee poll

The 1983 Alabama State Hornets football team represented Alabama State University as a member of the Southwestern Athletic Conference (SWAC) during the 1983 NCAA Division I-AA football season. Led by eighth-year head coach George James Jr., the Hornets compiled an overall record of 2–9, with a mark of 0–6 in conference play, and finished tied for seventh in the SWAC.

== Schedule ==
Date	Opponent	Site	Result	Attendance	Source
September 3	at Jackson State	Mississippi Veterans Memorial Stadium; Jackson, MS	L 0–21	18,344	
September 10	Southern	Cramton Bowl; Montgomery, AL	L 7–14		
September 17	vs. Alcorn State	Ladd Stadium; Mobile, AL (Gulf Coast Classic)	L 10–13		
September 24	at Texas Southern	Robertson Stadium; Houston, TX	L 3–10		
October 1	at No. 13 Tennessee State*	Hale Stadium; Nashville, TN	L 19–52	12,000	
October 8	Mississippi Valley State	Cramton Bowl; Montgomery, AL	L 27–28		
October 15	at Bethune–Cookman*	Welch Memorial Stadium; Daytona Beach, FL	L 6–24	3,000	
October 29	vs. Alabama A&M*	Legion Field; Birmingham, AL (Magic City Classic)	L 14–27		
November 5	No. 11 Grambling State	Cramton Bowl; Montgomery, AL	L 9–27		
November 12	District of Columbia*	Cramton Bowl; Montgomery, AL	W 37–24		
November 24	Tuskegee*	Cramton Bowl; Montgomery, AL (Turkey Day Classic)	W 13–3		
*Non-conference game; Rankings from Associated Press Poll released prior to the game
