= 1984 Prairie View A&M Panthers football team =

American college football season

1984 Prairie View A&M Panthers football
- Conference: Southwestern Athletic Conference
- Record: 0–11 (0–7 SWAC)
- Head coach: Conway Hayman (1st season)
- Defensive coordinator: Ronald Beard (1st season)
- Home stadium: Edward L. Blackshear Field

1984 Southwestern Athletic Conference football standings
	Conf.					Overall
Team	W		L		T	W		L		T
No. 1 Alcorn State $^	7	–	0	–	0	9	–	1	–	0
No. 6 Mississippi Valley State ^	6	–	1	–	0	9	–	2	–	0
Grambling State	5	–	2	–	0	7	–	4	–	0
Southern	4	–	3	–	0	6	–	5	–	0
Jackson State	3	–	4	–	0	4	–	5	–	1
Texas Southern	2	–	5	–	0	5	–	6	–	0
Alabama State	1	–	6	–	0	2	–	9	–	0
Prairie View A&M	0	–	7	–	0	0	–	11	–	0
$ – Conference champion; ^ – NCAA Division I-AA playoff participant; Rankings from NCAA Division I-AA Football Committee poll

The 1984 Prairie View A&M Panthers football team represented Prairie View A&M University as a member of the Southwestern Athletic Conference (SWAC) during the 1984 NCAA Division I-AA football season. Led by first-year head coach Conway Hayman, the Panthers compiled an overall record of 0–11 and a mark of 0–7 in conference play, and finished eighth in the SWAC.

== Schedule ==
Date	Opponent	Site	Result	Attendance	Source
September 8	at Stephen F. Austin*	Homer Bryce Stadium; Nacogdoches, TX	L 14–43		
September 15	at Jackson State	Mississippi Veterans Memorial Stadium; Jackson, MS	L 14–34		
September 22	at Southern	A. W. Mumford Stadium; Baton Rouge, LA	L 7–28		
September 29	vs. Grambling State	Cotton Bowl; Dallas, TX (rivalry)	L 0–42	22,457	
October 6	at Bishop*	Dallas, TX	L 8–34		
October 13	Texas Lutheran*	Edward L. Blackshear Field; Prairie View, TX	L 14–23		
October 20	Alabama State	Edward L. Blackshear Field; Prairie View, TX	L 20–29		
October 27	at No. 5 Mississippi Valley State	Magnolia Stadium; Itta Bena, MS	L 6–71	11,341	
November 3	at Florida A&M*	Bragg Memorial Stadium; Tallahassee, FL	L 8–41		
November 10	No. 3 Alcorn State	Edward L. Blackshear Field; Prairie View, TX	L 12–35		
November 17	at Texas Southern	Rice Stadium; Houston, TX (rivalry)	L 0–51		
*Non-conference game; Rankings from Associated Press Poll released prior to the game
