= 1983 Southern Jaguars football team =

American college football season

1983 Southern Jaguars football
- Conference: Southwestern Athletic Conference
- Record: 7–4 (5–2 SWAC)
- Head coach: Otis Washington (3rd season)
- Home stadium: A. W. Mumford Stadium

1983 Southwestern Athletic Conference football standings
	Conf.					Overall
Team	W		L		T	W		L		T
No. 10 Grambling State $	6	–	0	–	1	8	–	1	–	2
No. 15 Jackson State	5	–	2	–	0	8	–	3	–	0
Southern	5	–	2	–	0	7	–	4	–	0
No. 19 Mississippi Valley State	4	–	2	–	1	7	–	2	–	1
Alcorn State	4	–	3	–	0	7	–	3	–	0
Texas Southern	2	–	5	–	0	4	–	6	–	0
Alabama State	0	–	6	–	0	2	–	9	–	0
Prairie View A&M	0	–	6	–	0	0	–	11	–	0
$ – Conference champion; Rankings from NCAA Division I-AA Football Committee poll

The 1983 Southern Jaguars football team represented Southern University as a member of the Southwestern Athletic Conference (SWAC) during the 1983 NCAA Division I-AA football season. Led by third-year head coach Otis Washington, the Jaguars compiled an overall record of 7–4, with a conference record of 5–2, and finished tied for second in the SWAC.

== Schedule ==
Date	Opponent	Site	Result	Attendance	Source
September 10	at Alabama State	Cramton Bowl; Montgomery, AL	W 14–7		
September 17	Texas Southern	A. W. Mumford Stadium; Baton Rouge, LA	W 35–7		
September 24	vs. Prairie View A&M	Rice Stadium; Houston, TX	W 23–9		
October 2	at Mississippi Valley State	Magnolia Stadium; Itta Bena, MS	W 31–28		
October 8	at Nicholls State*	John L. Guidry Stadium; Thibodaux, LA	W 21–20		
October 15	at No. 3 Jackson State	Mississippi Veterans Memorial Stadium; Jackson, MS (rivalry)	L 0–31	57,376	
October 22	Alcorn State	A. W. Mumford Stadium; Baton Rouge, LA	W 20–19		
October 29	No. 13 Tennessee State*	A. W. Mumford Stadium; Baton Rouge, LA	L 24–49		
November 5	Morgan State*	A. W. Mumford Stadium; Baton Rouge, LA	W 45–27		
November 12	vs. Florida A&M*	Tampa Stadium; Tampa, FL (Orange Blossom Classic)	L 14–31	21,624	
November 26	vs. No. 10 Grambling State	Louisiana Superdome; New Orleans, LA (Bayou Classic)	L 10–24	58,199	
*Non-conference game; Rankings from NCAA Division I-AA Football Committee Poll released prior to the game
