= 1984 Mississippi Valley State Delta Devils football team =

American college football season

1984 Mississippi Valley State Delta Devils football

NCAA Division I-AA First Round, L 19–66 vs. Louisiana Tech
- Conference: Southwestern Athletic Conference
- Record: 9–2 (6–1 SWAC)
- Head coach: Archie Cooley (5th season)
- Home stadium: Magnolia Stadium

1984 Southwestern Athletic Conference football standings
	Conf.					Overall
Team	W		L		T	W		L		T
No. 1 Alcorn State $^	7	–	0	–	0	9	–	1	–	0
No. 6 Mississippi Valley State ^	6	–	1	–	0	9	–	2	–	0
Grambling State	5	–	2	–	0	7	–	4	–	0
Southern	4	–	3	–	0	6	–	5	–	0
Jackson State	3	–	4	–	0	4	–	5	–	1
Texas Southern	2	–	5	–	0	5	–	6	–	0
Alabama State	1	–	6	–	0	2	–	9	–	0
Prairie View A&M	0	–	7	–	0	0	–	11	–	0
$ – Conference champion; ^ – NCAA Division I-AA playoff participant; Rankings from NCAA Division I-AA Football Committee poll

The 1984 Mississippi Valley State Delta Devils team represented the Mississippi Valley State University as a member of the Southwestern Athletic Conference (SWAC) during the 1984 NCAA Division I-AA football season. Led by fifth-year head coach Archie Cooley, the Delta Devils played their home games at Magnolia Stadium—now known as Rice–Totten Stadium—in Itta Bena, Mississippi. Mississippi Valley State finished the season with an overall record of 9–2 and a mark of 6–1 in conference play, placing second in the SWAC. The team qualified for the NCAA Division I-AA playoffs, losing to Louisiana Tech in the first round. With an offense led by quarterback Willie Totten and wide receiver Jerry Rice, the Delta Devils scored 628 points on the season, averaging more than 57 points per game.

== Schedule ==
Date	Opponent	Rank	Site	Result	Attendance	Source
September 1	at Kentucky State*		Alumni Field; Frankfort, KY	W 86–0	1,300	
September 15	at Washburn*		Moore Bowl; Topeka, KS	W 77–15	4,000	
September 22	at Jackson State	No. T–18	Mississippi Veterans Memorial Stadium; Jackson, MS	W 49–32	50,337	
September 29	at No. 11 Southern		A. W. Mumford Stadium; Baton Rouge, LA	W 63–45		
October 13	vs. Grambling State		Hoosier Dome; Indianapolis, IN (Circle City Classic)	W 48–36	40,000	
October 20	at Texas Southern	No. 8	Robertson Stadium; Houston, TX	W 55–42		
October 27	Prairie View A&M^{†}	No. 5	Magnolia Stadium; Itta Bena, MS	W 71–6	11,341	
November 3	vs. No. 4 Alcorn State	No. 5	Mississippi Veterans Memorial Stadium; Jackson, MS	L 28–42	63,808	
November 10	Alabama State	No. 8	Magnolia Stadium; Itta Bena, MS	W 49–7		
November 17	Langston*	No. 8	Magnolia Stadium; Itta Bena, MS	W 83–11		
November 24	at No. 9 Louisiana Tech*	No. 6	Joe Aillet Stadium; Ruston, LA (NCAA Division I-AA First Round)	L 19–66	17,500	
*Non-conference game; ^{†}Homecoming; Rankings from NCAA Division I-AA Football Committee Poll released prior to the game

== Individual accomplishments ==
As a senior in 1984, Jerry Rice broke his own NCAA Division I-AA records for receptions (112) and receiving yards (1,845). His 27 touchdown receptions in that 1984 season set the NCAA mark for all divisions. Rice caught 17 passes for 199 yards against Southern, 17 for 294 against Kentucky State, and 15 for 285 against Jackson State, in the first win for Mississippi Valley over the Tigers since 1954. He scored five touchdowns twice that year. Rice was named to every 1984 College Football All-America Team, including the Associated Press squad, and finished ninth in Heisman Trophy balloting. In the Blue–Gray Football Classic all-star game played on Christmas Day, he earned MVP honors.

Rice finished his college career with 301 catches for 4,693 yards and 50 touchdowns. His NCAA record for total career touchdown receptions stood until October 7, 2006, when New Hampshire Wildcats wide receiver David Ball, recorded his 51st career receiving touchdown.

== Team players in the NFL ==
Player	Position	Round	Pick	NFL club
Jerry Rice	Wide receiver	1	16	San Francisco 49ers

- Willie Totten played for the Buffalo Bills in 1987.
