= 1985 Mississippi Valley State Delta Devils football team =

American college football season

1985 Mississippi Valley State Delta Devils football
- Conference: Southwestern Athletic Conference
- Record: 8–3 (5–2 SWAC)
- Head coach: Archie Cooley (6th season)
- Home stadium: Magnolia Stadium

1985 Southwestern Athletic Conference football standings
	Conf.					Overall
Team	W		L		T	W		L		T
No. 8 Grambling State +^	6	–	1	–	0	9	–	3	–	0
No. 15 Jackson State +^	6	–	1	–	0	8	–	3	–	0
Mississippi Valley State	5	–	2	–	0	8	–	3	–	0
No. 20 Alcorn State	5	–	2	–	0	7	–	3	–	0
Southern	3	–	4	–	0	6	–	5	–	0
Alabama State	2	–	5	–	0	3	–	8	–	0
Texas Southern	1	–	6	–	0	1	–	10	–	0
Prairie View A&M	0	–	7	–	0	2	–	9	–	0
+ – Conference co-champions; ^ – NCAA Division I-AA playoff participant; Rankings from NCAA Division I-AA Football Committee poll

The 1985 Mississippi Valley State Delta Devils football team represented Mississippi Valley State University as a member of the Southwestern Athletic Conference (SWAC) during the 1985 NCAA Division I-AA football season. Led by sixth-year head coach Archie Cooley, the Delta Devils compiled an overall record of 8–3, with a conference record of 5–2, and finished tied for third in the SWAC.

== Schedule ==
Date	Opponent	Rank	Site	Result	Attendance	Source
August 31	vs. Southern		Mississippi Veterans Memorial Stadium; Jackson, MS	W 28–7	41,000	
September 7	vs. Alabama A&M*		Legion Field; Birmingham, AL (A.G. Gaston Bowl)	W 32–19		
September 21	at Bishop*		Cotton Bowl; Dallas, TX	W 80–14	1,500	
September 28	at Jackson State	No. 13	Mississippi Veterans Memorial Stadium; Jackson, MS	W 35–14	56,978	
October 5	vs. Tennessee State*	No. T–8	Hoosier Dome; Indianapolis, IN (Circle City Classic)	W 28–13	40,000	
October 19	at No. 2 Grambling State	No. 6	Eddie G. Robinson Memorial Stadium; Grambling, LA	L 21–31		
October 26	Texas Southern	No. 12	Magnolia Stadium; Itta Bena, MS	W 59–40		
November 2	at Prairie View A&M	No. T–9	Astrodome; Houston, TX	W 56–17		
November 9	vs. Alcorn State	No. 7	Mississippi Veterans Memorial Stadium; Jackson, MS	L 28–35	42,100	
November 16	at Alabama State	No. T–18	Cramton Bowl; Montgomery, AL	W 55–6		
November 23	North Carolina A&T*	No. 16	Magnolia Stadium; Itta Bena, MS	L 35–36		
*Non-conference game; Rankings from NCAA Division I-AA Football Committee Poll released prior to the game
