= 1985 Southern Jaguars football team =

American college football season

1985 Southern Jaguars football
- Conference: Southwestern Athletic Conference
- Record: 6–5 (3–4 SWAC)
- Head coach: Otis Washington (5th season)
- Home stadium: A. W. Mumford Stadium

1985 Southwestern Athletic Conference football standings
	Conf.					Overall
Team	W		L		T	W		L		T
No. 8 Grambling State +^	6	–	1	–	0	9	–	3	–	0
No. 15 Jackson State +^	6	–	1	–	0	8	–	3	–	0
Mississippi Valley State	5	–	2	–	0	8	–	3	–	0
No. 20 Alcorn State	5	–	2	–	0	7	–	3	–	0
Southern	3	–	4	–	0	6	–	5	–	0
Alabama State	2	–	5	–	0	3	–	8	–	0
Texas Southern	1	–	6	–	0	1	–	10	–	0
Prairie View A&M	0	–	7	–	0	2	–	9	–	0
+ – Conference co-champions; ^ – NCAA Division I-AA playoff participant; Rankings from NCAA Division I-AA Football Committee poll

The 1985 Southern Jaguars football team represented Southern University as a member of the Southwestern Athletic Conference (SWAC) during the 1985 NCAA Division I-AA football season. Led by fifth-year head coach Otis Washington, the Jaguars compiled an overall record of 6–5, with a conference record of 3–4, and finished fifth in the SWAC.

== Schedule ==
Date	Opponent	Rank	Site	Result	Attendance	Source
August 31	vs. Mississippi Valley State		Mississippi Veterans Memorial Stadium; Jackson, MS	L 7–28	41,000	
September 14	vs. Alabama State		Ladd Stadium; Mobile, AL (Gulf Coast Classic)	W 35–14		
September 21	Texas Southern		A. W. Mumford Stadium; Baton Rouge, LA	W 22–14		
September 28	at Prairie View A&M		Astrodome; Houston, TX	W 14–12		
October 12	Nicholls State*	No. 19	A. W. Mumford Stadium; Baton Rouge, LA	W 25–22		
October 19	at Jackson State	No. T–20	Mississippi Veterans Memorial Stadium; Jackson, MS (rivalry)	L 9–27	39,000	
October 26	Alcorn State		A. W. Mumford Stadium; Baton Rouge, LA	L 13–23		
November 2	vs. Tennessee State*		Tiger Stadium; Detroit, MI (Coleman A. Young Foundation Football Classic)	W 13–10	18,539	
November 9	Delaware State*		A. W. Mumford Stadium; Baton Rouge, LA	L 8–46	22,500	
November 16	at Florida A&M*		Bragg Memorial Stadium; Tallahassee, FL	W 38–27	8,156	
November 23	vs. No. T–8 Grambling State		Louisiana Superdome; New Orleans, LA (Bayou Classic)	L 12–29	56,742	
*Non-conference game; Rankings from NCAA Division I-AA Football Committee Poll released prior to the game
