= 1985 Grambling State Tigers football team =

American college football season

1985 Grambling State Tigers football

SWAC co-champion

NCAA Division I-AA First Round, L 7–10 at Arkansas State
- Conference: Southwestern Athletic Conference
- Record: 9–3 (6–1 SWAC)
- Head coach: Eddie Robinson (43rd season)
- Home stadium: Eddie G. Robinson Memorial Stadium

1985 Southwestern Athletic Conference football standings
	Conf.					Overall
Team	W		L		T	W		L		T
No. 8 Grambling State +^	6	–	1	–	0	9	–	3	–	0
No. 15 Jackson State +^	6	–	1	–	0	8	–	3	–	0
Mississippi Valley State	5	–	2	–	0	8	–	3	–	0
No. 20 Alcorn State	5	–	2	–	0	7	–	3	–	0
Southern	3	–	4	–	0	6	–	5	–	0
Alabama State	2	–	5	–	0	3	–	8	–	0
Texas Southern	1	–	6	–	0	1	–	10	–	0
Prairie View A&M	0	–	7	–	0	2	–	9	–	0
+ – Conference co-champions; ^ – NCAA Division I-AA playoff participant; Rankings from NCAA Division I-AA Football Committee poll

The 1985 Grambling State Tigers football team represented Grambling State University as a member of the Southwestern Athletic Conference (SWAC) during the 1985 NCAA Division I-AA football season. Led by 43rd-year head coach Eddie Robinson, the Tigers compiled an overall record of 9–3 and a mark of 6–1 in conference play, and finished as SWAC co-champion. Grambling State advanced to the NCAA Division I-AA Football Championship playoffs, where they were defeated by Arkansas State in the first round.

The Tigers' 27–7 victory over Prairie View A&M was the 324th all-time victory for Robinson, and placed him ahead of Bear Bryant for the most career victories for a college football coach.

== Schedule ==
Date	Opponent	Rank	Site	Result	Attendance	Source
September 14	vs. Alcorn State		Independence Stadium; Shreveport, LA (Red River Classic)	W 30–20	30,000	
September 21	vs. North Carolina Central*		Yankee Stadium; Bronx, NY (Whitney Young Memorial Classic)	W 45–14	37,192	
September 28	vs. Oregon State*	No. 4	Independence Stadium; Shreveport, LA	W 23–6	13,396	
October 5	vs. Prairie View A&M	No. 2	Cotton Bowl; Dallas, TX (rivalry)	W 27–7	36,652	
October 11	at Tennessee State*	No. 2	Vanderbilt Stadium; Nashville, TN	W 31–24	22,000	
October 19	No. 6 Mississippi Valley State	No. 2	Eddie G. Robinson Memorial Stadium; Grambling, LA	W 31–21		
October 26	at Jackson State	No. 2	Mississippi Veterans Memorial Stadium; Jackson, MS	L 26–35	21,765	
November 2	Texas Southern^{†}	No. T–5	Eddie G. Robinson Memorial Stadium; Grambling, LA	W 30–6	11,469	
November 9	vs. Alabama State	No. 4	Atlanta–Fulton County Stadium; Atlanta, GA (Atlanta Football Classic)	W 28–0	12,000	
November 14	South Carolina State*	No. 4	Eddie G. Robinson Memorial Stadium; Grambling, LA	L 10–13		
November 23	vs. Southern	No. T–8	Louisiana Superdome; New Orleans, LA (Bayou Classic)	W 29–12	56,742	
November 30	at No. 6 Arkansas State*	No. 8	Indian Stadium; Jonesboro, AR (NCAA Division I-AA First Round)	L 7–10		
*Non-conference game; ^{†}Homecoming; Rankings from NCAA Division I-AA Football Committee Poll released prior to the game
