= George James Jr. =

American football coach

Biographical details
- Born: January 20, 1927
- Died: September 14, 2008 (aged 81); Montgomery, Alabama, U.S.

Coaching career (HC unless noted)
- 1954–1968: Robert L. Austin HS (AL)
- 1969–1975: Alabama State (defensive assistant)
- 1976–1983: Alabama State
- 1989: North Carolina A&T (assistant)
- 1990–1991: Kentucky State

Head coaching record
- Overall: 45–57–3 (college); 90–8–4 (high school)

George James Jr. (January 20, 1927 – September 14, 2008) was an American football coach. He served as the head football coach at Alabama State University from 1976 to 1983 and Kentucky State University from 1990 to 1991, compiling a career college football coaching record of 45–57–3. James died at the age of 81, on September 14, 2008, at his home in Montgomery, Alabama.

== Head coaching record ==
=== College ===
Year	Team	Overall	Conference	Standing	Bowl/playoffs
Alabama State Hornets (NCAA Division II independent) (1976–1981)
1976	Alabama State	8–3			
1977	Alabama State	4–4–1			
1978	Alabama State	8–3			
1979	Alabama State	6–5			
1980	Alabama State	6–5			
1981	Alabama State	5–4–1			
Alabama State Hornets (Southwestern Athletic Conference) (1982–1983)
1982	Alabama State	2–6–1	0–0	NA	
1983	Alabama State	2–9	0–6	T–6th	
Alabama State:		41–39–3	0–6		
Kentucky State Thorobreds (NCAA Division II independent) (1990–1991)
1990	Kentucky State	2–9			
1991	Kentucky State	2–9			
Kentucky State:		4–18			
Total:		45–57–3			
