= 1984 Alabama State Hornets football team =

American college football season

1984 Alabama State Hornets football
- Conference: Southwestern Athletic Conference
- Record: 2–9 (1–6 SWAC)
- Head coach: Willie Parker (4th season)
- Defensive coordinator: Ray Greene (1st season)
- Home stadium: Cramton Bowl

1984 Southwestern Athletic Conference football standings
	Conf.					Overall
Team	W		L		T	W		L		T
No. 1 Alcorn State $^	7	–	0	–	0	9	–	1	–	0
No. 6 Mississippi Valley State ^	6	–	1	–	0	9	–	2	–	0
Grambling State	5	–	2	–	0	7	–	4	–	0
Southern	4	–	3	–	0	6	–	5	–	0
Jackson State	3	–	4	–	0	4	–	5	–	1
Texas Southern	2	–	5	–	0	5	–	6	–	0
Alabama State	1	–	6	–	0	2	–	9	–	0
Prairie View A&M	0	–	7	–	0	0	–	11	–	0
$ – Conference champion; ^ – NCAA Division I-AA playoff participant; Rankings from NCAA Division I-AA Football Committee poll

The 1984 Alabama State Hornets football team represented Alabama State University as a member of the Southwestern Athletic Conference (SWAC) during the 1984 NCAA Division I-AA football season. Led by fourth-year head coach Willie Parker, the Hornets compiled an overall record of 2–9, with a mark of 1–6 in conference play, and finished seventh in the SWAC.

== Schedule ==
Date	Opponent	Site	Result	Attendance	Source
September 1	Jackson State	Cramton Bowl; Montgomery, AL	L 7–23		
September 8	at Southern	A. W. Mumford Stadium; Baton Rouge, LA	L 0–20		
September 15	at Alcorn State	Henderson Stadium; Lorman, MS	L 0–52		
September 22	vs. Texas Southern	Ladd Stadium; Mobile, AL (Gulf Coast Classic)	L 20–33		
October 6	Fort Valley State*	Cramton Bowl; Montgomery, AL	L 16–42		
October 13	Bethune–Cookman*	Cramton Bowl; Montgomery, AL	L 24–31		
October 20	at Prairie View A&M	Edward L. Blackshear Field; Prairie View, TX	W 29–20		
October 27	vs. Alabama A&M*	Legion Field; Birmingham, AL (Magic City Classic)	L 12–28	25,000	
November 3	at Grambling State	Eddie G. Robinson Memorial Stadium; Grambling, LA	L 6–17	19,000	
November 10	at No. 8 Mississippi Valley State	Magnolia Stadium; Itta Bena, MS	L 7–49		
November 22	Tuskegee*	Cramton Bowl; Montgomery, AL (Turkey Day Classic)	W 31–8	13,500	
*Non-conference game; Rankings from Associated Press Poll released prior to the game
