= Satellite Express =

College football duo

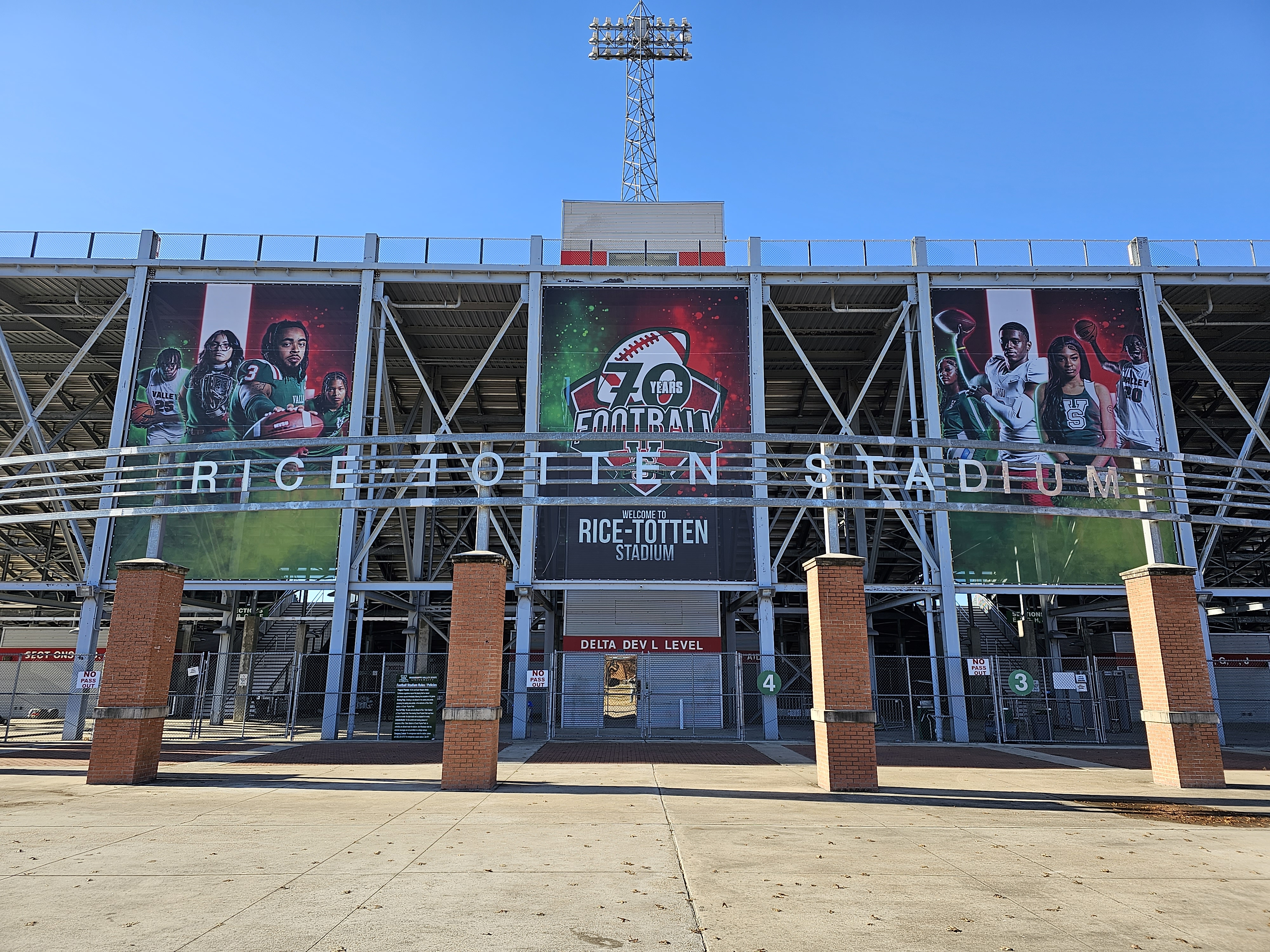
Rice-Totten Stadium

The Satellite Express was a college duo composed of Willie "The Satellite" Totten and Jerry "World" Rice (because there "wasn't a pass in the world that he couldn't catch") who played for the Mississippi Valley State Delta Devils from 1981 to 1985. Totten set more than 50 Division I-AA passing records, and Rice setting many Division I-AA receiving records. The Delta Devils averaged more than 57 points a game during the 1984 season, with Totten throwing for a record 58 touchdowns and leading the Delta Devils to the Division I-AA playoffs in 1984. Archie Cooley, who was the head coach at MVSU from 1980 to 1986, was the architect of the innovative pass-oriented offense known as "The Satellite Express" (named by former MVSU athletic director Chuck Profit because the quarterback goes by satellite in the team's terminology) which included 5 WRs and the "No Huddle" offense

MVSU would rename Magnolia Field Rice-Totten Stadium in honor of the duo (Totten holds the distinction of being one of the few individuals to coach in a stadium named after him). Totten was inducted into the College Football Hall of Fame in 2005. Rice would be inducted into the College Football Hall of Fame in 2006 and the Pro Football Hall of Fame in 2010. Both are also members of Phi Beta Sigma fraternity.
