= 1983 Texas Southern Tigers football team =

American college football season

1983 Texas Southern Tigers football
- Conference: Southwestern Athletic Conference
- Record: 4–6 (1–5 SWAC)
- Head coach: Joe Redmond (3rd season)
- Home stadium: Robertson Stadium

1983 Southwestern Athletic Conference football standings
	Conf.					Overall
Team	W		L		T	W		L		T
No. 10 Grambling State $	6	–	0	–	1	8	–	1	–	2
No. 15 Jackson State	5	–	2	–	0	8	–	3	–	0
Southern	5	–	2	–	0	7	–	4	–	0
No. 19 Mississippi Valley State	4	–	2	–	1	7	–	2	–	1
Alcorn State	4	–	3	–	0	7	–	3	–	0
Texas Southern	2	–	5	–	0	4	–	6	–	0
Alabama State	0	–	6	–	0	2	–	9	–	0
Prairie View A&M	0	–	6	–	0	0	–	11	–	0
$ – Conference champion; Rankings from NCAA Division I-AA Football Committee poll

The 1983 Texas Southern Tigers football team represented Texas Southern University as a member of the Southwestern Athletic Conference (SWAC) during the 1983 NCAA Division I-AA football season. Led by third-year head coach Joe Redmond, the Tigers compiled an overall record of 4–6, with a mark of 1–5 in conference play, and finished seventh in the SWAC.

== Schedule ==
Date	Opponent	Site	Result	Source
September 10	Texas A&I*	Robertson Stadium; Houston, TX	W 2–0	
September 17	at Southern	A. W. Mumford Stadium; Baton Rouge, LA	L 7–35	
September 24	Alabama State	Robertson Stadium; Houston, TX	W 10–3	
October 1	at Lamar*	Cardinal Stadium; Beaumont, TX	W 15–14	
October 8	Alcorn State	Robertson Stadium; Houston, TX	L 13–27	
October 15	Southeastern Louisiana*	Robertson Stadium; Houston, TX	L 7–20	
October 22	at Mississippi Valley State	Magnolia Stadium; Itta Bena, MS	L 21–30	
October 29	at No. 16 Grambling State	Eddie G. Robinson Memorial Stadium; Grambling, LA	L 0–55	
November 5	Jackson State	Robertson Stadium; Houston, TX	L 0–38	
November 19	Prairie View A&M	Robertson Stadium; Houston, TX (rivalry)	W 28–20	
*Non-conference game; Rankings from NCAA Division I-AA Football Committee Poll released prior to the game
