= 1985 Prairie View A&M Panthers football team =

American college football season

1985 Prairie View A&M Panthers football
- Conference: Southwestern Athletic Conference
- Record: 2–9 (0–7 SWAC)
- Head coach: Conway Hayman (2nd season)
- Defensive coordinator: Ronald Beard (2nd season)
- Home stadium: Edward L. Blackshear Field; Astrodome

1985 Southwestern Athletic Conference football standings
	Conf.					Overall
Team	W		L		T	W		L		T
No. 8 Grambling State +^	6	–	1	–	0	9	–	3	–	0
No. 15 Jackson State +^	6	–	1	–	0	8	–	3	–	0
Mississippi Valley State	5	–	2	–	0	8	–	3	–	0
No. 20 Alcorn State	5	–	2	–	0	7	–	3	–	0
Southern	3	–	4	–	0	6	–	5	–	0
Alabama State	2	–	5	–	0	3	–	8	–	0
Texas Southern	1	–	6	–	0	1	–	10	–	0
Prairie View A&M	0	–	7	–	0	2	–	9	–	0
+ – Conference co-champions; ^ – NCAA Division I-AA playoff participant; Rankings from NCAA Division I-AA Football Committee poll

The 1985 Prairie View A&M Panthers football team represented Prairie View A&M University as a member of the Southwestern Athletic Conference (SWAC) during the 1985 NCAA Division I-AA football season. Led by second-year head coach Conway Hayman, the Panthers compiled an overall record of 2–9 and a mark of 0–7 in conference play, and finished eighth in the SWAC.

== Schedule ==
Date	Opponent	Site	Result	Attendance	Source
August 31	at Texas Southern	Astrodome; Houston, TX (Labor Day Classic)	L 7–19		
September 7	at Sam Houston State*	Pritchett Field; Huntsville, TX	W 14–9	6,500	
September 14	at Lamar*	Cardinal Stadium; Beaumont, TX	L 7–30		
September 21	Jackson State	Edward L. Blackshear Field; Prairie View, TX	L 3–21	5,120	
September 28	Southern	Astrodome; Houston, TX	L 12–14		
October 5	vs. No. 2 Grambling State	Cotton Bowl; Dallas, TX (State Fair Classic)	L 7–27	36,652	
October 12	Bishop*	Edward L. Blackshear Field; Prairie View, TX	W 28–16		
October 19	at Texas Lutheran*	Matador Stadium; Seguin, TX	L 6–30		
October 26	at Alabama State	Cramton Bowl; Montgomery, AL	L 10–17		
November 2	Mississippi Valley State	Astrodome; Houston, TX	L 17–56		
November 16	at Alcorn State	Henderson Stadium; Lorman, MS	L 7–41	1,450	
*Non-conference game; Rankings from NCAA Division I-AA Football Committee Poll released prior to the game
