= 1984 Southern Jaguars football team =

American college football season

1984 Southern Jaguars football
- Conference: Southwestern Athletic Conference
- Record: 6–5 (4–3 SWAC)
- Head coach: Otis Washington (4th season)
- Home stadium: A. W. Mumford Stadium

1984 Southwestern Athletic Conference football standings
	Conf.					Overall
Team	W		L		T	W		L		T
No. 1 Alcorn State $^	7	–	0	–	0	9	–	1	–	0
No. 6 Mississippi Valley State ^	6	–	1	–	0	9	–	2	–	0
Grambling State	5	–	2	–	0	7	–	4	–	0
Southern	4	–	3	–	0	6	–	5	–	0
Jackson State	3	–	4	–	0	4	–	5	–	1
Texas Southern	2	–	5	–	0	5	–	6	–	0
Alabama State	1	–	6	–	0	2	–	9	–	0
Prairie View A&M	0	–	7	–	0	0	–	11	–	0
$ – Conference champion; ^ – NCAA Division I-AA playoff participant; Rankings from NCAA Division I-AA Football Committee poll

The 1984 Southern Jaguars football team represented Southern University as a member of the Southwestern Athletic Conference (SWAC) during the 1984 NCAA Division I-AA football season. Led by fourth-year head coach Otis Washington, the Jaguars compiled an overall record of 6–5 and a mark of 4–3 in conference play, and finished fourth in the SWAC.

== Schedule ==
Date	Opponent	Rank	Site	Result	Attendance	Source
September 8	Alabama State		A. W. Mumford Stadium; Baton Rouge, LA	W 20–0		
September 15	at Texas Southern		Robertson Stadium; Houston, TX	W 10–3		
September 22	Prairie View A&M		A. W. Mumford Stadium; Baton Rouge, LA	W 28–7		
September 29	Mississippi Valley State	No. 11	A. W. Mumford Stadium; Baton Rouge, LA	L 45–63		
October 6	at Nicholls State*		John L. Guidry Stadium; Thibodaux, LA	L 26–43		
October 13	Jackson State		A. W. Mumford Stadium; Baton Rouge, LA (rivalry)	W 34–28		
October 20	at No. 4 Alcorn State		Henderson Stadium; Lorman, MS	L 15–44		
October 27	at No. 3 Tennessee State*		Vanderbilt Stadium; Nashville, TN	L 7–42	38,500	
November 3	North Carolina A&T*		A. W. Mumford Stadium; Baton Rouge, LA	W 41–0		
November 10	Florida A&M*		A. W. Mumford Stadium; Baton Rouge, LA	W 28–18		
November 24	vs. Grambling State		Louisiana Superdome; New Orleans, LA (Bayou Classic)	L 29–31	51,752	
*Non-conference game; Rankings from Associated Press Poll released prior to the game
