= 1983 Prairie View A&M Panthers football team =

American college football season

1983 Prairie View A&M Panthers football
- Conference: Southwestern Athletic Conference
- Record: 0–11 (0–6 SWAC)
- Head coach: James McKinley (2nd season)
- Home stadium: Edward L. Blackshear Field

1983 Southwestern Athletic Conference football standings
| | Conf. | | | | | Overall |
| Team | W | | L | | T | W | | L | | T |
|---|---|---|---|---|---|---|---|---|---|---|
| No. 10 Grambling State $ | 6 | – | 0 | – | 1 | 8 | – | 1 | – | 2 |
| No. 15 Jackson State | 5 | – | 2 | – | 0 | 8 | – | 3 | – | 0 |
| Southern | 5 | – | 2 | – | 0 | 7 | – | 4 | – | 0 |
| No. 19 Mississippi Valley State | 4 | – | 2 | – | 1 | 7 | – | 2 | – | 1 |
| Alcorn State | 4 | – | 3 | – | 0 | 7 | – | 3 | – | 0 |
| Texas Southern | 2 | – | 5 | – | 0 | 4 | – | 6 | – | 0 |
| Alabama State | 0 | – | 6 | – | 0 | 2 | – | 9 | – | 0 |
| Prairie View A&M | 0 | – | 6 | – | 0 | 0 | – | 11 | – | 0 |
$ – Conference champion; Rankings from NCAA Division I-AA Football Committee poll

The 1983 Prairie View A&M Panthers football team represented Prairie View A&M University as a member of the Southwestern Athletic Conference (SWAC) during the 1983 NCAA Division I-AA football season. Led by second-year head coach James McKinley, the Panthers compiled an overall record of 0–11, with a conference record of 0–6, and finished tied for seventh in the SWAC.

== Schedule ==
| Date | Opponent | Site | Result | Attendance | Source |
|---|---|---|---|---|---|
| September 1 | at Stephen F. Austin* | Lumberjack Stadium; Nacogdoches, TX | L 6–37 | | |
| September 10 | at Southwest Texas State* | Bobcat Stadium; San Marcos, TX | L 7–46 | 11,533 | |
| September 17 | Jackson State | Edward L. Blackshear Field; Prairie View, TX | L 0–50 | 4,000 | |
| September 24 | vs. Southern | Rice Stadium; Houston, TX | L 9–23 | | |
| October 1 | at No. 17 Grambling State | Eddie G. Robinson Memorial Stadium; Grambling, LA (rivalry) | L 8–42 | | |
| October 8 | Bishop* | Edward L. Blackshear Field; Prairie View, TX | L 20–32 | | |
| October 15 | at Texas Lutheran* | Matador Stadium; Seguin, TX | L 14–33 | | |
| October 29 | Mississippi Valley State | Edward L. Blackshear Field; Prairie View, TX | L 12–54 | | |
| November 5 | at Arkansas–Pine Bluff* | Pumphrey Stadium; Pine Bluff, AR | L 6–34 | | |
| November 12 | at Alcorn State | Henderson Stadium; Lorman, MS | L 6–38 | | |
| November 19 | at Texas Southern | Robertson Stadium; Houston, TX (rivalry) | L 20–28 | | |
*Non-conference game; Rankings from NCAA Division I-AA Football Committee Poll released prior to the game
