= Archie Cooley =

American football coach (1940–2024)

Biographical details
- Born: March 18, 1939; Sumrall, Mississippi, U.S.
- Died: April 18, 2024 (aged 85); Fort Worth, Texas, U.S.

Playing career
- c. 1960: Jackson State
- Positions: Center, linebacker

Coaching career (HC unless noted)
- 1964–1970: Southside HS (MS)
- 1971–1973: Alcorn State (DL/LB)
- 1974–?: Tennessee State (LB)
- 1980–1986: Mississippi Valley State
- 1987–1990: Arkansas–Pine Bluff
- 1992: Southern (OC)
- 1993: Norfolk State
- 199?–?: Texas Southern (OC)
- 199?-?: Carter-Riverside (OC)
- 2000–2006: Paul Quinn

Head coaching record
- Overall: 83–78–5 (college)
- Bowls: 0–1 (NCAA D-I-AA playoffs)

Archie Lee Cooley Jr. (March 18, 1939 – April 18, 2024) was an American college football coach. He served as the head football coach at Mississippi Valley State University from 1980 to 1986, University of Arkansas–Pine Bluff from 1987 to 1991, Norfolk State University in 1993, and Paul Quinn College from 2000 to 2006. At Mississippi Valley State, Cooley coached the tandem of Willie Totten and Jerry Rice, future College Football Hall of Fame quarterback and wide receiver, respectively.

== Early life ==
Cooley was born on March 18, 1939 in Sumrall, Mississippi to Archie Lee Cooley Sr. and Bernice Cooley, and raised in Laurel, Mississippi, where he attended Oak Park High School. He played college football at Jackson State University under John Merritt. Cooley graduated in 1962, and married Georgia Ester Reed on December 28 of that year. The couple had two children, Dwight and Lisa.

== Coaching career ==
Cooley began his coaching career at Southside High School in Heidelberg, Mississippi, where he worked for seven years. From 1971 to 1973 he was a linebacker and defensive line coach at Alcorn State University. Cooley moved to Tennessee State University in 1974 as a linebacker coach.

The success Cooley achieved at Mississippi Valley State is attributed to his design of his innovative "Satellite Express" passing offense, which was a no huddle offense featuring five wide receivers. Cooley led the Mississippi Valley State Delta Devils to their only Division I-AA playoff appearance in 1984. The 1984 Mississippi Valley State Delta Devils football team set different passing, receiving, and scoring records that featured Jerry Rice and quarterback Willie Totten. To this day, Cooley is the winningest coach in the history of the Delta Devil football program. He also served as an associate professor of physical education at Mississippi Valley State.

In 1987 Cooley moved on to University of Arkansas at Pine Bluff, which was a NAIA member at the time. He coached there for four years, from 1987 to 1990, and served as athletic director and associate professor. He resigned from his position after the NAIA found 41 player ineligibility violations under his tenure, with the NAIA giving the program the "death penalty."

Cooley worked at Southern as an offensive coordinator in 1992 before being hired as head coach at Norfolk State University in 1992, where he stayed for only one year before being pressured to resign.

Cooley later worked as an offensive coordinator at Texas Southern and Carter-Riverside High School before becoming the head coach at Paul Quinn College in Dallas. Paul Quinn was an NAIA member school which was then establishing a new football program, and Cooley was responsible for starting the program from the ground up. He served as head coach from 2000 to 2006 when the administration decided to drop the football program after the 2006 season due to financial difficulties.

In 2007, Cooley was inducted into the Southwestern Athletic Conference Hall of Fame.

== Death ==
Cooley died in Fort Worth, Texas on April 18, 2024.

== Head coaching record ==
=== College ===
Year	Team	Overall	Conference	Standing	Bowl/playoffs	NCAA^{#}
Mississippi Valley State Delta Devils (Southwestern Athletic Conference) (1980–1986)
1980	Mississippi Valley State	5–5	3–3	T–3rd		
1981	Mississippi Valley State	4–6–1	2–4	T–5th		
1982	Mississippi Valley State	5–5	2–4	5th		
1983	Mississippi Valley State	7–2–1	4–2–1	4th		19
1984	Mississippi Valley State	9–2	6–1	2nd	L NCAA Division I-AA First Round	6
1985	Mississippi Valley State	8–3	5–2	T–3rd		
1986	Mississippi Valley State	4–4–1	3–3–1	5th		
Mississippi Valley State:		42–27–2	25–19–1			
Arkansas–Pine Bluff Golden Lions (NAIA Division I independent) (1987–1990)
1987	Arkansas–Pine Bluff	7–4				
1988	Arkansas–Pine Bluff	4–6–1				
1989	Arkansas–Pine Bluff	7–2–1				
1990	Arkansas–Pine Bluff	9–1				
Arkansas–Pine Bluff:		27–13–2				
Norfolk State Spartans (Central Intercollegiate Athletic Association) (1993)
1993	Norfolk State	3–7–1	2–5–1	T–8th		
Norfolk State:		3–7–1	2–5–1			
Paul Quinn Tigers () (2000–2006)
2000	Paul Quinn	0–2				
2001	Paul Quinn	1–3				
2002	Paul Quinn	4–2				
2003	Paul Quinn	0–5				
2004	Paul Quinn	1–7				
2005	Paul Quinn	3–6				
2006	Paul Quinn	2–6				
Paul Quinn:		11–31				
Total:		83–78–5				
