= 1984 Grambling State Tigers football team =

American college football season

1984 Grambling State Tigers football
- Conference: Southwestern Athletic Conference
- Record: 7–4 (5–2 SWAC)
- Head coach: Eddie Robinson (42nd season)
- Home stadium: Eddie G. Robinson Memorial Stadium

1984 Southwestern Athletic Conference football standings
	Conf.					Overall
Team	W		L		T	W		L		T
No. 1 Alcorn State $^	7	–	0	–	0	9	–	1	–	0
No. 6 Mississippi Valley State ^	6	–	1	–	0	9	–	2	–	0
Grambling State	5	–	2	–	0	7	–	4	–	0
Southern	4	–	3	–	0	6	–	5	–	0
Jackson State	3	–	4	–	0	4	–	5	–	1
Texas Southern	2	–	5	–	0	5	–	6	–	0
Alabama State	1	–	6	–	0	2	–	9	–	0
Prairie View A&M	0	–	7	–	0	0	–	11	–	0
$ – Conference champion; ^ – NCAA Division I-AA playoff participant; Rankings from NCAA Division I-AA Football Committee poll

The 1984 Grambling State Tigers football team represented Grambling State University as a member of the Southwestern Athletic Conference (SWAC) during the 1984 NCAA Division I-AA football season. Led by 42nd-year head coach Eddie Robinson, the Tigers compiled an overall record of 7–4 and a mark of 5–2 in conference play, and finished third in the SWAC.

== Schedule ==
Date	Opponent	Site	Result	Attendance	Source
September 2	vs. Alcorn State	Louisiana Superdome; New Orleans, LA	L 13–27	13,676	
September 8	vs. Boston University*	Yankee Stadium; Bronx, NY (Whitney Young Memorial Classic)	L 9–16	31,979	
September 22	Bethune–Cookman*	Eddie G. Robinson Memorial Stadium; Grambling, LA	W 35–17		
September 29	vs. Prairie View A&M	Cotton Bowl; Dallas, TX (rivalry)	W 42–0	22,457	
October 6	Tennessee State*	Eddie G. Robinson Memorial Stadium; Grambling, LA	L 24–34		
October 13	vs. Mississippi Valley State	Hoosier Dome; Indianapolis, IN (Circle City Classic)	L 36–48	40,000	
October 20	Jackson State	Eddie G. Robinson Memorial Stadium; Grambling, LA	W 19–3	6,000	
October 27	at Texas Southern	Rice Stadium; Houston, TX	W 44–16	30,154	
November 3	Alabama State	Eddie G. Robinson Memorial Stadium; Grambling, LA	W 17–6		
November 10	at South Carolina State*	Oliver C. Dawson Stadium; Orangeburg, SC	W 8–7	10,071	
November 24	vs. Southern	Louisiana Superdome; New Orleans, LA (Bayou Classic)	W 31–29	51,752	
*Non-conference game
