= Ron Mitchell (coach) =

American football and basketball coach

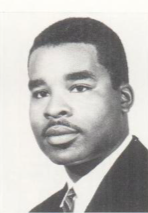
- Mitchell, circa 1965

Biographical details
- Born: September 29, 1938 (age 88); Chicago, Illinois, U.S.
- Died: october 25th, 2002; Louisville, Kentucky
- Education: Kentucky State College

Coaching career (HC unless noted)

Football
- 1968: Boston University (freshmen)
- 1969–1971: Boston University (defensive coordinator)
- 1982: Kentucky State (interim HC)
- 1985: Alabama State (interim HC)

Men's basketball
- 1968–?: Boston University (freshmen)
- 1971–1974: Boston University
- 1974–1976: Grinnell
- 1981–1982: Kentucky State

Women's basketball
- 1980–1981: Kentucky State (interim HC)
- 1986–1998: Alabama State

Head coaching record
- Overall: 3–13 (football); 53–88 (men's basketball)

Ronald Mitchell (born September 29, 1938) is an American former college football and college basketball coach.

== Biography ==
A Chicago native, Mitchell attended Crane High School there, where he was captain of the basketball and football teams. He went on to play both college basketball and college football at Kentucky State College. He later served in the United States Army at Fort Leonard Wood in Missouri. He received a master's degree in health, physical education and recreation from Indiana University in 1967.

Mitchell became the first African American appointed to a full-time athletics position at Boston University when we was hired as an assistant football and basketball coach in 1968. In 1971, he became the first African American appointed as head basketball coach for a major college program, also at Boston University.

Mitchell served as a head coach in three different college sports: men's basketball, women's basketball, and football:

- He was the head men's basketball coach at Boston University from 1971 to 1974, at Grinnell College from 1974 to 1976, and at Kentucky State University for one season in 1981–82.
- He was the interim head women's basketball coach at Kentucky State in 1980–81; the team won the 1981 NAIA women's basketball championship and Mitchell was named NAIA Coach of the Year. He served as the head women's basketball coach at Alabama State University from 1986 to 1998.
- He was the interim head football coach at Kentucky State for the final five games on the 1982 season and the interim head football coach at Alabama State for the 1985 season.

== Head coaching record ==
=== Football ===
Year	Team	Overall	Conference	Standing	Bowl/playoffs
Kentucky State Thorobreds (NCAA Division II independent) (1982)
1982	Kentucky State	0–5 (Note: LeRoy Smith resigned on October 19. Mitchell served as interim head coach for the remainder of the season.)			
Kentucky State:		0–5			
Alabama State Hornets (Southwestern Athletic Conference) (1985)
1985	Alabama State	3–8	2–5	6th	
Alabama State:		3–8	2–5		
Total:		3–13			
