= 1985 Texas Southern Tigers football team =

American college football season

1985 Texas Southern Tigers football
- Conference: Southwestern Athletic Conference
- Record: 1–10 (1–6 SWAC)
- Head coach: Lionel Taylor (2nd season)
- Home stadium: Robertson Stadium; Astrodome

1985 Southwestern Athletic Conference football standings
	Conf.					Overall
Team	W		L		T	W		L		T
No. 8 Grambling State +^	6	–	1	–	0	9	–	3	–	0
No. 15 Jackson State +^	6	–	1	–	0	8	–	3	–	0
Mississippi Valley State	5	–	2	–	0	8	–	3	–	0
No. 20 Alcorn State	5	–	2	–	0	7	–	3	–	0
Southern	3	–	4	–	0	6	–	5	–	0
Alabama State	2	–	5	–	0	3	–	8	–	0
Texas Southern	1	–	6	–	0	1	–	10	–	0
Prairie View A&M	0	–	7	–	0	2	–	9	–	0
+ – Conference co-champions; ^ – NCAA Division I-AA playoff participant; Rankings from NCAA Division I-AA Football Committee poll

The 1985 Texas Southern Tigers football team represented Texas Southern University as a member of the Southwestern Athletic Conference (SWAC) during the 1985 NCAA Division I-AA football season. Led by second-year head coach Lionel Taylor, the Tigers compiled an overall record of 1–10, with a mark of 1–6 in conference play, and finished seventh in the SWAC.

== Schedule ==
Date	Opponent	Site	Result	Attendance	Source
August 31	Prairie View A&M	Astrodome; Houston, TX (Labor Day Classic)	W 19–7		
September 7	at Lamar*	Cardinal Stadium; Beaumont, TX	L 20–32		
September 14	at Stephen F. Austin*	Lumberjack Stadium; Nacogdoches, TX	L 12–55		
September 21	at Southern	A. W. Mumford Stadium; Baton Rouge, LA	L 14–22		
September 28	Alabama State	Robertson Stadium; Houston, TX	L 14–24		
October 5	Texas A&I*	Robertson Stadium; Houston, TX	L 7–45		
October 12	Alcorn State	Robertson Stadium; Houston, TX	L 13–36		
October 19	at Angelo State*	San Angelo Stadium; San Angelo, TX	L 6–21		
October 26	at Mississippi Valley State	Magnolia Stadium; Itta Bena, MS	L 40–59		
November 2	at No. T–5 Grambling State	Eddie G. Robinson Memorial Stadium; Grambling, LA	L 6–30	11,469	
November 9	Jackson State	Robertson Stadium; Houston, TX	L 7–28	8,500	
*Non-conference game; Rankings from NCAA Division I-AA Football Committee Poll released prior to the game
