= Amon Carter Riverside High School =

Coordinates: 32.7817°N 97.2993°W

- 3301 Yucca Dr. Fort Worth, TX, 76111

Information
- Type: Public, Secondary
- School district: Fort Worth Independent School District
- NCES District ID: 4819700
- Superintendent: Kent Scribner
- NCES School ID: 481970001839
- Principal: Victor Alfaro
- Teaching staff: 65.58 (FTE)
- Enrollment: 1,030 (2023-2024)
  - Grade 9: 394
  - Grade 10: 283
  - Grade 11: 257
  - Grade 12: 196
- Student to teacher ratio: 15.71
- Colors: Red, white, and blue
- Mascot: Eagle
- Website: carterriverside.fwisd.org

Amon Carter Riverside High School is a grade 9-12 high school in Fort Worth, Texas. It has over 1,000 students.

Carter Riverside is a Texas Education Agency recognized school in the Fort Worth Independent School District.

== History ==
Amon Carter-Riverside High School opened as Riverside High School in 1936 with its school mascot being unveiled as the Eagle, named after the Eagle family who educated the Riverside neighborhood. The school was designed in a Spanish Baroque style by Fort Worth architect Wyatt C. Hedrick and was funded through the Works Progress Administration. The school initially housed junior and high school students until Riverside Middle School was built next door. In 1941, the school was renamed to Amon Carter-Riverside High School in a unanimous vote by the Fort Worth school board.

Additions to the school were made in 1954, 1957, 1979, 1983, 2003, and 2017.

In 2022, a new 110,000 square foot addition was added which included fine arts, CTE, and core science classrooms, along with ROTC and an athletics field house.

== Athletics ==
=== Football ===
The Carter-Riverside High School football team made their first playoff appearance in 2025 following a 30-year playoff drought after defeating Western Hills High School. In the playoffs, the Eagles faced Alvarado in the 4A D1 playoffs, losing 0-77.

=== Wrestling ===
Carter-Riverside High School is a member of District 6 Region 2 of the UIL wrestling alignment. Carter- Riverside is one of only 7 FWISD schools to have a wrestling program. In 2017 the program made Fort Worth ISD history when Jacqueline Bunyavong (5A girls, 102 lbs) became the school's and district's first wrestling state champion, defeating the defending champion by decision.

== Clubs and activities ==
=== Debate ===
The Carter-Riverside debate team has been growing in popularity since it was restarted in school year 2015–2016. Students can choose to take Debate as an elective or speech credit and sign up to compete at local, regional, state, and national competitions. The team is self-funded through student fundraisers. Notable accolades include winning the Trimble Tech tournament in January 2017 and placing third in districts in March 2017 behind Grapevine High School and Colleyville High School.

=== Yearbook ===
The Carter-Riverside yearbook is both a class and an extracurricular opportunity for students who want to be involved in creating the yearbook. Students take photos of events, interview people on campus, document student life, and complete all of the design and layout.

== Programs of Choice ==
The school has three POCs (Programs of Choice). They are the Eagle Scholars' Academy, Medical Academy and Information Technology.
