= Mississippi Veterans Memorial Stadium =

Football stadium in Jackson, Mississippi, U.S.

Coordinates: 32°19′46.7″N 90°10′47.2″W

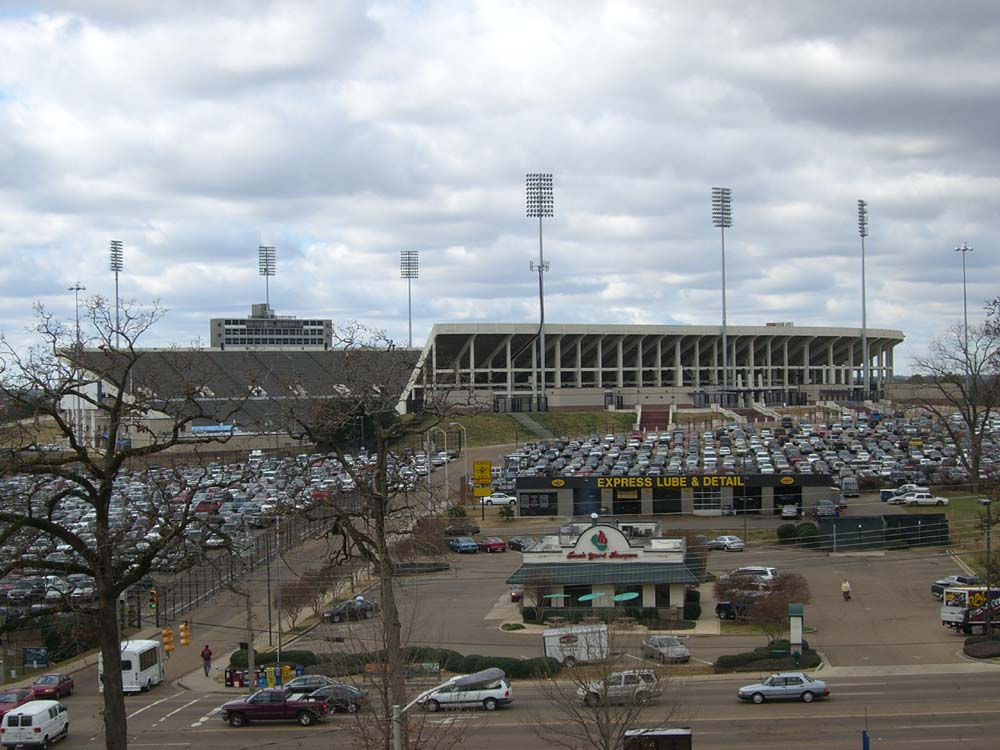
- Interactive map of Mississippi Veterans Memorial Stadium
- Location: 2531 North State Street; Jackson, Mississippi 39216
- Operator: Jackson State University
- Capacity: 60,492
- Surface: Grass
- Record attendance: 64,112 (Miss. State vs. Southern Miss. 1981)

Construction
- Opened: 1950

Tenants
- College football Southern Miss Golden Eagles (alternate site) (1952–1988); Ole Miss Rebels (alternate site) (1953–1996); Mississippi State Bulldogs (alternate site) (1953–1990); Jackson State Tigers (1967–present); Egg Bowl (1973–1990); SWAC Championship Game (2021-present)

Mississippi Veterans Memorial Stadium is an outdoor football stadium in Jackson, Mississippi, United States. Mississippi Veterans Memorial Stadium has been the home stadium of the Jackson State Tigers football team since 1970. Originally known as War Veterans Memorial Stadium, it was later known as Hinds County War Memorial Stadium. It was redesigned and enlarged in 1960 and Ole Miss vs. Arkansas dedicated Mississippi Memorial Stadium in 1961 before a capacity crowd of 46,000. With political support from Ole Miss and Mississippi State and leadership from Ole Miss Athletics Director Warner Alford, Mississippi Memorial Stadium was enlarged to 62,500 in 1981 and on September 26, 1981 Ole Miss and Arkansas again dedicated the facility before 63,522.

As referenced, for many years Mississippi Memorial Stadium served as an alternate home stadium for the University of Mississippi and Mississippi State University, and occasionally the University of Southern Mississippi. From 1973 to 1990 the Egg Bowl was played there and from 1992 to 2013 it hosted the Mississippi High School Activities Association state championship football games. In addition to college and high school games it has hosted several National Football League (NFL) preseason games. The Stadium was renamed Mississippi Veterans Memorial Stadium in 1995. For many years, the stadium was the largest in the state until the University of Mississippi expanded its stadium in 2016.

== Largest recorded crowds in stadium history ==
Teams	Date	Attendance
Miss. State vs. Southern Miss.	November 7, 1981	64,112
Miss. Valley vs. Alcorn State	November 4, 1984	63,808
Ole Miss vs. Arkansas	September 26, 1981	63,522
Ole Miss vs. Miss. State	November 22, 1980	62,520
Jackson State vs. Alcorn State	November 23, 1996	62,512
Jackson State vs. Alcorn State	November 19, 1994	62,512
Ole Miss vs. Miss. State	November 21, 1981	61,153

== History ==
Construction on the facility began in early 1949 and it opened in 1950 with a seating capacity of 21,000. By 1953 temporary seating had brought the capacity up to 25,000 and in 1961 the stadium was expanded to hold 46,000. Then in 1981 it underwent an expansion that brought total capacity to 62,512, although subsequent renovations dropped the current seating to the official 60,492 seats. In 1960 the state legislature took over control of the stadium and it remained under their supervision until 2011 when "operational, administrative and managing powers and duties" were transferred to Jackson State University.

The stadium hosted its first football game on December 9, 1950, a contest between Holmes Junior College Bulldogs and the Kilgore College Rangers of Kilgore, Texas. A crowd of 18,000 saw Holmes fall to the visiting Rangers 32–12. The first Division I-A game took place on November 22, 1952, when Southern Mississippi defeated Louisville 55–26. Ole Miss first played their first game there on September 19, 1953, defeating Chattanooga 39–6, and on Halloween day of that same year, Mississippi State played there for the first time, suffering a 27–20 loss to Texas Tech.

From the 1950s through the 1990s, Ole Miss (University of Mississippi), Mississippi State, and Southern Miss regularly played selected "home" games there, including "SEC doubleheader Saturdays" in which one school would host a conference opponent in the morning or afternoon and the other would host a conference opponent at night. Notably, the annual Egg Bowl contests between Ole Miss and Mississippi State were held there from 1973 through the 1990 contest, after which the game returned to the two schools' respective campuses. Shortly after the 1980 expansion both Ole Miss and Mississippi State decided to enhance their on-campus facilities to develop the same home-field advantage of their fellow Southeastern Conference members, and gradually stopped playing games in Jackson altogether. The last game played there by an SEC school was a blowout win by Ole Miss over Division I-AA VMI in 1996; the Rebels' last conference game at Jackson was a 1993 win over Arkansas. Mississippi State's last home game at Jackson was a 34–22 victory over LSU in 1990 and their last game of any sort there was the 1990 Egg Bowl where they lost to the Rebels 21–9 playing as the visiting team. Southern Miss made regular appearances as well, playing both UM and MSU as well as games against such schools as Texas A&M (which joined the SEC in 2012). The Golden Eagles played their final home game there in 1988, a 38–21 win over Mississippi State. Between its use as the home of the Egg Bowl and an alternate home venue for Ole Miss, Mississippi State and Southern Miss, Veterans Memorial Stadium hosted many of the most important football games in Mississippi during the second half of the 20th century.

The stadium was also host to the annual Capital City Classic between Jackson State and Alcorn State University, both of the Southwestern Athletic Conference, from 1993 to 2010. Starting in 2011 the game began to alternate between Veterans Memorial Stadium and Alcorn State's home field, Jack Spinks Stadium, in Lorman when The Braves exercised their right as the home to host the game on their campus. In a document published on the Alcorn State website University President M. Christopher Brown II and interim athletic director Dwayne White informally dubbed the game the "Soul Bowl".

From 2000 to 2004 Veterans Memorial was home of the renewed Backyard Brawl between Millsaps College and Mississippi College. On September 2, 2000, after a 40-year hiatus, the two schools resumed their football series and in front of a reported crowd of 10,200 spectators. Millsaps defeated Mississippi College 20–19.

From 1992 to 2013 the Mississippi High School Activities Association state championship football games were played at the stadium, but on July 20, 2014 MHSAA executive director Don Hinton announced that those games would begin rotating between Davis Wade Stadium at Mississippi State and Vaught–Hemingway Stadium at Ole Miss.

In 2024, the stadium's atmosphere won the championship in the College Football Campus Tour Best FCS Stadium Invitational, beating out the Kibbie Dome in Idaho in the title round with 58% of nearly 12,000 votes.

== Potential redevelopment ==
The facility faced an uncertain future as Jackson State University explored and proposed building an on-campus venue.

In the spring of 2013 Jackson State unveiled a proposal for a 50,000 seat, $200 million domed stadium that would also house the Tigers' basketball team, host concerts, and host special events. In addition to seating 50,000 for football, it would hold 17,000 for basketball and 21,000 for concerts and include 75 sky boxes for rental. The JSU Sports Hall of Fame would have been located on the first floor.

... the ultimate goal is that we have our own stadium close to campus just because we think that would be more beneficial to JSU.

— Michael Thomas, JSU vice president of business and finance.

If JSU had relinquished control of the stadium, the University of Mississippi Medical Center expressed interest in using the property to build a medical research and treatment "city" in the area. If Jackson State had built a stadium either on or close to its campus UMMC would have regained ownership of the old facility and it would have been razed.

We don't have a football team, so we would have no use for the stadium. So we would develop a plan for the development for that property ... There's a lot involved here, and we don't want to cloud the issue. We want to make sure everyone understands that we're in full support of Jackson State.

— Dr. David Powe, UMMC chief administrative affairs officer.

== Notable games ==
- Kilgore College (TX) 32, Holmes Junior College 12, (December 9, 1950) - The first football game played in the newly opened stadium.
- Southern Mississippi 55, Louisville 26, (November 11, 1952) - The first Division I-A game played in the stadium.
- Ole Miss 39, UT Chattanooga 6 (September 19, 1953) - This was the first game played by Ole Miss in the stadium.
- Texas Tech 27, Mississippi State 20, (October 31, 1953) - This was the first game played by Mississippi State in the stadium.
- Mississippi State 13, Auburn 10, (November 5, 1963) - The unranked Bulldogs pulled the upset over the #5 ranked Tigers on the strength of an interception late in the game that allowed them to drive down for a game winning 36-yard Justin Canale field goal with just 22 seconds remaining.
- Jackson State 20, Grambling State 14, (October 1967) - Jackson State's first game at Memorial Stadium effectively desegregated the state's largest sporting venue. The game versus SWAC foe Grambling was witnessed by 20,000 fans.
- Houston 29, Ole Miss 7, (October 26, 1968) - The Houston Cougars dealt Ole Miss quarterback Archie Manning his only loss in Jackson. Manning was 8–1 as a starter in games played at Veterans Memorial Stadium.
- Ole Miss 26, LSU 23, (November 1, 1969) - With his team trailing 23–12 in the third quarter, Ole Miss QB Archie Manning engineered two touchdown drives to give the Rebels a three-point win over the Tigers. Ole Miss clinched the game when heir defense knocked down a fourth-down pass at their own 23 with time running out.
- Jackson State 72, Lane College 0, (1972) - Jackson State running back, and future Pro Football Hall of Famer, Walter "Sweetness" Payton set the NCAA Division I-AA scoring record, racking up 46 points by rushing for 6 touchdowns and scoring a pair of two-point conversions. Payton also rushed for a then school record 279 yards.
- Ole Miss 38, Mississippi State 10, (November 24, 1973)- The first Egg Bowl played at the stadium.
- Ole Miss 20, Notre Dame 13, (September 17, 1977) - The Rebels forced five turnovers and en route to an upset over the third ranked, and 14 point favorite, Fighting Irish. trailing 13–10 with 4:53 left to play a senior third-string QB Tim Ellis completed three of four passes for 68 yards and directed an 80-yard drive that ended with a touchdown throw to Fullback James Storey. The contest would prove to be Notre Dame's only loss of the season and the Irish would go on to be named both AP and UPI national champions.
- Mississippi State 6, Alabama 3, (Nov. 1, 1980) - Coached by Bear Bryant the Crimson Tide were ranked No. 1 in the national polls and had won 28 consecutive games, 26 straight Southeastern Conference games and had defeated Mississippi State 22 straight times. Bulldog head coach Emory Bellard was credited with being the inventor of the wishbone offense and had worked with the defense all week to come up with a scheme that could stop it. Trailing 6–3 the Tide had a first-and-goal at the State 4-yard line with 22 seconds left. Alabama QB Don Jacobs ran the triple option, MSU defensive lineman Tyrone Keys penetrated the backfield and hit Jacobs before he had a chance to pitch the ball. Jacobs fumbled and Bulldog lineman Billy Jackson recovered for State.
- Southern Miss 7, Mississippi State 6, (November 7, 1981) - Southern clinches a narrow 7–6 victory before a crowd reported at 64,112 – a figure some claim set the stadium's all-time attendance record, although other accounts say that the record was broken during the 1984 Mississippi Valley – Alcorn State game.
- Ole Miss 24, Mississippi State 23, (November 19, 1983) - In what has become known to both UM and MSU fans as "The Immaculate Deflection," the 1983 Egg Bowl is notable because the wind helped preserve Ole Miss' 24–23 victory. Down by a point with 24 seconds left in the game, MSU kicked what would have been a 27-yard game-winning field goal. MSU freshman kicker Artie Cosby kicked it straight and long and what appeared to be over the crossbar, but as the ball reached the goal posts, a 40 mph gusting wind suspended the ball inches from the uprights, after which it fell short of the goal post, securing the victory for the Rebels.
- Alcorn State 42, Mississippi Valley State 28, (November 4, 1984) - Both teams entered the contest with undefeated records. Valley, under the guidance of future SWAC hall of fame coach Archie "Gunslinger" Cooley was 7–0 (4–0 SWAC) and ranked fifth in Division I-AA while Alcorn, coached by future college football hall of famer Marino "The Godfather" Casem, was 6–0 (3–0 SWAC) and ranked fourth. Led by quarterback Willie "Satellite" Totten and future Pro Football Hall of Fame wide receiver Jerry Rice, The Valley Delta Devils entered the game averaging 666 yards and 64 points per game on offense, tops in Division I-AA. By contrast Alcorn State Braves entered the game ranked second on defense. Behind the running of tailback Perry Quails, who finished the day with 211 yards and 5 touchdowns on the ground, and an effective pass rush the Braves built a 28-7 halftime lead over the Delta Devils. Valley stormed back scoring 3 unanswered touchdowns and tying the game with 14:56 left to play. In the end, however, the Braves' running game and defense proved too much. With 9:26 to go, Totten's pass for Cleo Armstrong was intercepted at the Alcorn 20. The Braves then went on a 6-minute 17-play touchdown drive that ended with Quails carrying the ball the last five plays. On the next series, Totten underthrew Rice, and corner-back Issiac Holt returned the pass 29 yards for a touchdown to make the final score 42–28. On the day Totten finished 26 of 52 for 383 yards with 2 touchdowns and 4 interceptions. Rice finished the day with 134 yards and 1 touchdown on 8 receptions. Alcorn State would go on to win the SWAC championship while Valley finished second.
- Alcorn State 52, Jackson State 34, (November 19, 1994) - Steve McNair's penultimate college game was played in front of 62,512 fans inside Mississippi Veterans Memorial Stadium as the annual JSU-Alcorn rivalry reached a fever pitch. McNair capped off his campaign for the Heisman with a 533-yard performance.
- Millsaps 20, Mississippi College 19, (September 2, 2000) - After a 40-year hiatus Millsaps and Mississippi College renewed their rivalry. Redubbed "The Backyard Brawl", the contest was witnessed by a reported crowd of 10,200. The game was played there through the 2004 meeting when the series took another brief hiatus while Mississippi College attempted a move to Division II. The move didn't happen and the series resumed in 2006 with the games alternating between the schools' campuses.
- Alabama A&M 40, Arkansas Pine-Bluff 33, (May 1, 2021) - Veterans Stadium was chosen as the site of the Spring 2021 Southwestern Athletic Conference (SWAC) Football Championship following the SWAC's spring 2021 football season. The game was initially scheduled to be played on the campus of the highest ranked team at the conclusion of regular season but was relocated due to the COVID-19 related game cancellations that directly impacted Alabama A&M and Arkansas-Pine Bluff.

== Other events ==
The 1993 Drum Corps International World Championships were held there with the Cadets of Bergen County taking 1st place.

== See also ==
- List of NCAA Division I FCS football stadiums

Preceded by Camp Randall Stadium	Host of the Drum Corps International; World Championship; 1993	Succeeded by Foxboro Stadium
