= 1986 Peach Bowl =

American college football game

- 19th Peach Bowl
- 1986 Peach Bowl logo
Virginia Tech Hokies	NC State Wolfpack
(8–2–1)	(8–2–1)
Independent	ACC
25	24
Head coach: Bill Dooley	Head coach: Dick Sheridan
	AP 18
	1	2	3	4	Total
Virginia Tech	10	0	6	9	25
NC State	7	14	0	3	24
- Date: December 31, 1986
- Season: 1986
- Stadium: Fulton County Stadium
- Location: Atlanta, Georgia
- MVP: Offense, Erik Kramer (NC State); Defense, Derrick Taylor (NC State)
- Favorite: NC State by 2
- Referee: John Nealon (Big Ten)
- Halftime show: Marching Virginians, Wolfpack Marching Band
- Attendance: 53,668

United States TV coverage
- Network: Mizlou Television Network
- Announcers: Ray Scott and Lee Corso

The 1986 Peach Bowl was a post-season American college football bowl game at Fulton County Stadium in Atlanta, Georgia between the Virginia Tech Hokies and the North Carolina State Wolfpack from on December 31, 1986. The game was the final contest of the 1986 NCAA Division I-A football season for both teams, and ended in a 25–24 victory for Virginia Tech, the first bowl victory in school history.

Virginia Tech came into the game with an 8–2–1 record that included a lopsided loss to the Temple Owls, who would forfeit the season two years later after using an ineligible player. Facing the Hokies in the Peach Bowl were the 18th-ranked Wolfpack from North Carolina State University. N.C. State was led by head coach Dick Sheridan and had a regular-season record of 8–2–1 that included five wins over Atlantic Coast Conference teams.

The 1986 Peach Bowl kicked off five years minus one day since Virginia Tech had last played in Atlanta—during the 1981 Peach Bowl. Virginia Tech scored first in the game, but NC State's Bulluck blocked a Tech punt in the Tech end zone and recovered it for a tying touchdown. Virginia Tech kicked a field goal at the end of the quarter to take a 10–7 lead, but NC State fought back, scoring 14 unanswered points in the second quarter to take a 21–10 lead by halftime. In the third quarter, the game turned into a defensive battle. Neither side scored until late in the third quarter, when Tech took advantage of a State fumble to score the first touchdown of the second half. Tech failed to convert a two-point conversion, but NC State fumbled again on the ensuing possession, and Tech was able to drive for another touchdown. Leading 22–21, Tech attempted another two-point conversion, which also failed.

NC State, needing to score, drove down the field and kicked a go-ahead 33-yard field goal with 7:12 remaining in the game. After a failed possession, Tech was forced to punt the ball, allowing NC State to run down the clock. The Virginia Tech defense eventually forced a stop, giving the Tech offense one final chance to win the game. With 1:53 on the clock and beginning from their own 20-yard line, the Hokies drove 57 yards to the NC State 23-yard line. With under a minute left, Virginia Tech had no timeouts, but NC State committed a pass interference foul in the end zone, allowing kicker Chris Kinzer to successfully kick a 40-yard field goal as time expired to give Virginia Tech the win.

== Team selection ==
The Peach Bowl game was created in 1968 by the Lions Club of Atlanta as a means to attract tourism to the city. First played at Grant Field on the campus of Georgia Tech, the game was moved to Fulton County Stadium in 1971. By the mid-1980s, the Peach Bowl was facing hard times. At the time, NCAA guidelines for bowls required 75 percent of gross receipts to go to participating schools, with 33 percent of tickets to the game also required to go to each school. In 1983, the NCAA threatened to revoke the Peach Bowl's charter when ticket sales hovered around 25,000 with a week to go before the bowl. Last-minute sales saved the game, as attendance at the 1983 game climbed to 40,000 and a new television contract allowed the bowl to make a payout of $580,000 to each team. Still, the bowl's future was in doubt.

In the spring of 1986, the Metro Atlanta Chamber of Commerce (MACOC) took over the Peach Bowl. The bowl executive director at the time was Dick Bestwick, and he encouraged the Chamber to step up its support of the game over what had been provided by the Lions Club. In 1986, the Peach Bowl had no contractual obligations with college football conferences, as its successor, the Chick-fil-A Bowl, does today. Team selections were made by the Peach Bowl committee, a board of Atlanta community members, business leaders, and organizers of the Peach Bowl. To form one half of the matchup, the committee selected second-place Atlantic Coast Conference team NC State, which accepted the bowl bid on November 22, 1986, the day of their final regular-season game. The other half of the matchup was Virginia Tech, a football independent that had finished with nine wins, one loss, and one tie during the regular season and received its invitation one week after the regular season concluded.

Virginia Tech had not participated in a bowl game since the 1984 Independence Bowl against Air Force, while NC State was playing in its first postseason game since 1978. The two teams had played each other 39 times prior to the Peach Bowl, with Virginia Tech leading the all-time series, 20–16–3.

=== Virginia Tech ===
In the days leading up to the Peach Bowl, one sportswriter called Virginia Tech's 1986 football season a "season of surprises." Tech began the season having gone 6–5 in 1985. In their first game, the Hokies faced the Cincinnati Bearcats. Tech lost, 24–20, on a last-minute play that saw a Cincinnati pass tipped twice and caught for a sustaining first down. The drive eventually resulted in a game-winning touchdown for Cincinnati.

Tech recovered from that season-opening loss by going on a four-game winning streak, defeating Clemson in South Carolina, Syracuse in New York, and East Tennessee State and West Virginia in Blacksburg. On October 11, against South Carolina, the Hokies tied, 27–27.

Then, on a trip to Norfolk, Virginia to face the Temple Owls in the Oyster Bowl, Tech fell 29–13 for what appeared to be its second loss of the season. It was later revealed, however, that Temple used an ineligible player in the game, and the Owls were forced to forfeit the win. Following the Temple game, Tech returned to its winning ways, defeating archrival Virginia, Kentucky, Richmond, and Vanderbilt. One week after defeating Vanderbilt, November 22, 1986, Tech received an invitation to the 1986 Peach Bowl.

=== NC State ===
NC State began the 1986 college football season coming off three consecutive losing seasons. Those losing seasons also resulted in the firing of head coach Tom Reed, who was replaced by Dick Sheridan. Sheridan's first game with the Wolfpack was against East Carolina on September 6. NC State won, 38–10. After a 14–14 tie the next week against Pittsburgh, the Wolfpack won their next two games, against Wake Forest and Maryland.

On October 11, NC State traveled to Grant Field in Atlanta, Georgia, home of the Georgia Tech Yellow Jackets. There, they suffered a lopsided 59–21 loss, the worst ever suffered by a Sheridan-coached team at the time. Following the loss to the Yellow Jackets, said linebacker Pat Teague, "the coaches and players came together. The coaches were hurting as bad as we were. We pulled them up and they pulled us up. That was the turning point."

Following the "turning point," the Wolfpack won three consecutive games, boosting their overall record to 6–1–1. One of the victories was against the Clemson Tigers, who would ultimately go on to win that year's ACC football championship. On November 8, NC State traveled to Charlottesville, Virginia, to play the Virginia Cavaliers. In a close-fought game, State lost, 20–16. Though the Wolfpack won their final two regular-season games (against Duke and Western Carolina), the loss to Virginia denied them a share of the ACC championship. Despite that missed opportunity, NC State finished the season with a winning record and received a bid to the Peach Bowl.

== Pregame buildup ==
The Peach Bowl was the final game as head coach of Virginia Tech for Bill Dooley, who had accumulated a record of 62–38–1 for the Hokies since assuming the head coaching job in 1978. Tech president William Lavery had long disagreed with Dooley about the role of football at Virginia Tech, and prior to the beginning of the season, Lavery told Dooley that his tenure as coach would end on January 1, 1987. This fact was revealed to the football team and the general public after Tech's third game of the season. At the time, Dooley was the winningest head coach in Virginia Tech history, but was under investigation for recruiting violations and had settled a breach-of-contract lawsuit against the university for $3.5 million. As part of the out-of-court settlement, Dooley was required to quit his position following the Peach Bowl. In the weeks leading up to the game, Dooley dodged questions about his future. On December 23, it was announced that Murray State head coach Frank Beamer would replace Dooley after the Peach Bowl. Facing Dooley across the field was NC State head coach Dick Sheridan, who in his first year as head coach of the Wolfpack, was named Atlantic Coast Conference coach of the year and guided the Wolfpack to eight wins.

=== Offense ===
The game was expected to be an offensive struggle that could potentially break the then-record 74 points scored in the 1970 Peach Bowl. During the regular season, NC State averaged 359 yards on offense per game, while Virginia Tech averaged 358 yards. On defense, State gave up an average of 402 yards per game, while Tech allowed an average of 366 yards. NC State averaged almost 28 points per game, while Virginia Tech averaged just over 24 points. This statistical parity was reflected by pre-game point spreads, which favored NC State by two points.

State quarterback Erik Kramer was the cornerstone of one of those high-powered offenses, passing for 2,092 yards and 14 touchdowns en route to All-ACC honors and being named the ACC's player of the year. He set school records for passing yards in a season and total yards in a season despite being hampered by an injured ankle suffered in the Wolfpack's game against South Carolina. He was ably assisted in the passing game by All-ACC receiver Nasrallah Worthen, who led the team in receptions after catching 41 passes for 686 yards. State's offense was mostly accumulated through the air, as the Wolfpack averaged less than 160 yards per game on the ground.

Virginia Tech's offense was slightly more balanced, featuring two running backs who had success throughout the regular season. Maurice Williams rushed the ball 166 times for 1,029 yards and six touchdowns during the regular season, and Eddie Hunter contributed 872 rushing yards. Through the air, Tech quarterback Erik Chapman passed for 1,627 yards and 10 touchdowns during the season prior to the Peach Bowl, making him the most prolific Virginia Tech passer in the nine-year tenure of Tech head Coach Bill Dooley.

The Hokies suffered a setback on offense a few days prior to the Peach Bowl when it was announced that offensive tackle Jim Davie was suspended from playing in the game after testing positive for anabolic steroids as part of a nationwide series of random tests conducted by the NCAA. Tech defensive end Morgan Roane was also suspended from playing for reasons not revealed by the university.

=== Defense ===
On defense, Tech allowed an average of 190 yards per game through the air. Free safety Carter Wiley and cornerback Billy Myers had three interceptions each during the regular season. Virginia Tech linebacker Lawrence White was expected to miss the game after undergoing knee surgery following the Hokies' last regular-season game. White was the team's No. 3 tackler in terms of statistics, having accumulated 77 during the course of the regular season. The team's No. 1 and 2 tacklers were linebackers Paul Nelson and Jamel Agemy, who had 104 and 80 tackles, respectively. The Hokies' rush defense allowed an average of 175 rushing yards per game and 14 total rushing touchdowns.

State's defense allowed an average of 228.6 yards through the air during the regular season and the pass defense led by Derrick Taylor, who had six interceptions. At linebacker, Pat Teague and Kelvin Crooms were considered keys to the Wolfpack run defense, which allowed an average of 173 rushing yards per game and 14 total rushing touchdowns.

=== Special teams ===
Both Virginia Tech and NC State featured All-America placekickers. NC State's Mike Cofer was named an Associated Press All-America honorable mention selection after converting 13 of his 17 field goal attempts, while Virginia Tech's Chris Kinzer had been successful throughout the regular season, making 22 of 27 field goal attempts, and breaking the school record for single-season scoring with 93 points.

== Game summary ==
The 1986 Peach Bowl kicked off at 1:05 p.m. EST on December 31, 1986, at Fulton County Stadium in Atlanta, Georgia. At kickoff, the sky was partly cloudy with an air temperature of 45 °F (7 °C). The wind was from the south at 12 miles per hour (19 km/h). The game was played before a sellout crowd of 53,668, just the third sellout in the history of the Peach Bowl at that point. Virginia Tech won the ceremonial pre-game coin toss, and elected to kick off to NC State. Therefore, the Wolfpack received the ball to begin the game, while Virginia Tech received the ball to begin the second half. The referee for the game was John Nealon, Bob Pickens was the umpire, and Ed Maracich was the linesman. Each team received more than $600,000 for participating in the game.

=== First quarter ===
Following Virginia Tech's kickoff, NC State returned the ball to the 27-yard line, where the Wolfpack began the game's first play. That play was a short run to the right. On the next play, NC State picked up the game's first first down with a rush up the middle by fullback Mal Crite. Crite picked up another first down on the next play, driving the Wolfpack inside Virginia Tech territory, but the Hokies' defense stiffened and forced the Wolfpack to punt after NC State failed to gain another first down. Tech returned the punt to its 21-yard line, where the Tech offense took over. On Virginia Tech's first offensive play, running back Maurice Williams broke free for a 77-yard run that took the Hokies inside the one-yard line of NC State. The run was the longest of Williams' career and is a Peach Bowl record for longest play from scrimmage. Two plays later, Virginia Tech's Eddie Hunter crossed the goal line and scored the game's first points. The touchdown and extra point made the score 7–0, Virginia Tech.

Following Virginia Tech's post-touchdown kickoff, NC State began its second possession of the game at its 24-yard line after a short kick return. The NC State's second drive of the game was more successful than its first, but as before, the Wolfpack offense ground to a halt before penetrating too deeply into Tech territory, and State was forced to punt the ball back to Virginia Tech. The Hokie offense began work at its eight-yard line but went three and out and prepared to punt the ball back to NC State. Tech punter Tony Romero, kicking from the Tech goal line, had his kick blocked by State defender Derrick Taylor. The ball rolled into the Virginia Tech end zone and was recovered by an NC State's Brian Bulluck for a touchdown. The play and extra point tied the game at 7–7.

Virginia Tech received NC State's kickoff and returned it to their 25-yard line, where Tech's offense returned to the field. After picking up short yardage on two rushing plays, Tech quarterback Erik Chapman completed a pass to tight end Steve Johnson to give the Hokies a first down at their 48-yard line with just over four minutes to go in the quarter. Tech continued to drive into Wolfpack territory, but inside the NC State 35-yard line, Tech committed a 15-yard illegal block penalty that pushed the Hokies back to the Wolfpack 47-yard line and had them facing a first down and 25 yards. Though unable to gain the 25 yards needed for another first down, Tech did make up most of the penalty yards, putting the ball at the Wolfpack 30-yard line. Facing fourth down, Tech sent in kicker Chris Kinzer to attempt a 46-yard field goal, which was successfully completed. The score gave Tech a 10–7 lead with 1:06 remaining the first quarter.

Kinzer delivered the post-score kickoff, and NC State began its final drive of the first quarter at its 32-yard line with 1:01 remaining. The Wolfpack picked up a quick first down but were forced to punt when they did not gain another. NC State's punt was returned to the Tech 13-yard line and the quarter came to an end with Virginia Tech leading, 10–7.

=== Second quarter ===
Tech began the second quarter in possession of the ball with a first down at their 13-yard line. The Hokies picked up a first down, but then NC State safety Michael Brooks jumped in front of a Virginia Tech pass, intercepting it at the 50-yard line. With 13:05 remaining in the quarter, NC State had its first offensive possession of the second quarter. The Wolfpack picked up several first downs, driving within the Virginia Tech 25-yard line for their furthest offensive penetration of the game. After being stopped for no or little gain on consecutive plays, NC State quarterback Erik Kramer completed a 25-yard touchdown pass to Nasrallah Worthen. The score and extra point gave NC State its first lead of the game, 14–10, with 8:55 remaining in the first half.

Virginia Tech returned the post-touchdown kickoff to its 26-yard line. The Hokie offense picked up short gains on first and second down before Tech quarterback Erik Chapman threw his second interception of the game, a pass that was tipped into the air and caught by NC State defender Derrick Taylor. The Wolfpack offense took over at the 46-yard line of Virginia Tech. On its first play after the interception, Kramer completed a 19-yard pass to Haywood Jeffires. After a short run, Kramer completed a 13-yard pass to Jeffries for another first down. Deep inside the Tech red zone, it took the Wolfpack two more plays before Kramer connected on a pass to tight end Ralph Britt for a touchdown. NC State now led 21–10 with just over four minutes remaining before halftime.

Following the score, kickoff, and return, Tech began another offensive possession at its 24-yard line. The Hokies picked up two first downs and drove into NC State territory, but the clock continued to tick toward halftime. In the Wolfpack side of the field, Tech running back Eddie Hunter broke free for a 23-yard run, the longest play by Virginia Tech in the second quarter. There was now just over two minutes remaining in the quarter. Tech was unable to pick up another first down after Hunter's run, and attempted to convert the fourth down rather than trying a field goal. When the play was stopped for a loss, however, Virginia Tech was denied points and NC State's offense returned with 47 seconds remaining in the half.

The Wolfpack proceeded to run out the clock and took a 21–10 lead into halftime.

=== Third quarter ===
Because NC State received the ball to begin the game, Virginia Tech received the ball to begin the second half. Tech received NC State's kickoff and returned it to the 10-yard line, where the Hokie offense began work. Tech began working down the field, running the ball for short gains and throwing passes for longer gains. Tech picked up three first downs, then reached NC State territory on a pass to Donnelly. Once on the NC State side of the field, Tech picked up another first down, but Tech's quarterback was sacked on third down for a loss, and the Hokies were forced to punt the ball away. The ball landed at the NC State 12-yard line where the Wolfpack began a drive.

NC State went three and out after receiving the ball, and after Tech incurred a running into the kicker penalty on the first punt attempt, NC State punted the ball away. After the kick, Tech took over on offense at its 27-yard line. On Tech's first play after the punt, however, Hunter fumbled the ball after a 10-yard rush. NC State recovered the ball, and the Wolfpack offense returned to the field at the Tech 40-yard line. On their first play after the fumble recover, Kramer completed a 12-yard pass to Worthen for a first down. During the next play, Kramer fumbled the ball while attempting to run with it, and Virginia Tech's defense recovered. This allowed the Tech offense to return to the field and attempt another offensive drive beginning at their 27-yard line.

Tech picked up a first down, then Chapman was forced to scramble for a first down after facing third and 10. Stopped inches short of gaining the first down, Tech risked turning the ball over by attempting to convert the fourth down. Unlike their previous try in the game, Tech was successful and the Hokies' drive continued. Tech continued to pick up yardage and first downs, advancing deep into the NC State side of the field. Inside the State 30-yard line, Tech quarterback Chapman was sacked for a 10-yard loss. He responded by throwing a 30-yard pass on the next play, driving Virginia Tech inside the State one-yard line. Williams rushed into the end zone with 33 seconds remaining in the quarter, cutting the Wolfpack lead to 21–16. Virginia Tech elected to attempt a two-point conversion, which was unsuccessful.

NC State received Tech's post-touchdown kickoff and returned the ball to their 32-yard line. The Wolfpack offense had time for just one play—an eight-yard pass—before the end of the quarter. With one quarter remaining in the game, NC State still held a 21–16 lead.

=== Fourth quarter ===
The fourth quarter began with NC State in possession of the ball at their 40-yard line and facing a second down and one yard. On the first play of the quarter, NC State quarterback Erik Kramer ran the ball, but fumbled at the end of the run. The ball was recovered by Virginia Tech, and the Hokie offense took the field. The first Virginia Tech play of the quarter was a first-down throw to David Everett that drove the Hokies into Wolfpack territory. Tech followed the pass by driving down the field with alternating run and pass plays. Tech penetrated the NC State 20-yard line with 12 minutes remaining in the quarter, and continued to drive. Once the Hokies crossed the State 10-yard line, the State defense stiffened and the Hokies were able to gain a first down only with difficulty. With a first down at the State seven-yard line, it took Tech just two plays to earn a touchdown. The Hokies again attempted a two-point conversion, but were again stopped short. Despite that setback, the touchdown gave Tech six points and a 22–21 lead, their first since the 8:55 mark in the second quarter.

Because Tech committed a 15-yard unsportsmanlike conduct penalty following the touchdown, NC State was able to acquire good field position during the kickoff return, starting their drive at their 44-yard line. On the second play of the drive, Erik Kramer completed an 18-yard pass to Nasrallah Worthen, driving State into the Tech side of the field. After a short play, Kramer again completed a long pass, this time to Bobby Crumpler for 24 yards. Now inside the Tech red zone, Kramer was tackled for a big loss, losing some of the yardage that he had gained with the previous play. NC State was unable to pick up another first down and sent in Mike Cofer to attempt a 33-yard kick, which was successfully completed. The field goal regained NC State a 24–22 lead.

Following the post-score kick, Tech began its offensive drive at its 23-yard line with just under seven minutes to play in the game. The Hokies picked up a first down on three short rushing plays, then another on a single passing play. This drove the Hokies to their 45-yard line with just over five minutes to play. Tech was unable to gain another first down and was forced to punt the ball to NC State. The ball was fielded at the 14-yard line, which was where the NC State offense began its final drive of the game.

On State's first play after the punt, fullback Mal Crite ran for a 40-yard gain, pushing State's offense to the Tech 46-yard line with just over four minutes left. State pushed forward another seven yards, but failed to gain another first down and prepared to punt the ball back to Tech with 3:14 remaining in the game. Rather than punt the ball, however, State punter Kelly Hollodick instead received the snap on fourth down and ran for a first down. Because State retained possession, it was able to continue to run down the clock after the fake punt. Tech stopped the clock once by calling a timeout and prevented State from gaining another first down. With 2:01 remaining in the game, State punted the ball into Tech's end zone for a touchback.

Tech's offense took the field at their 20-yard line with 1:53 remaining in the game, two timeouts left (used to stop the clock as necessary), and needing at least a field goal to win the game. Tech picked up one first down via a pass, then another as the Hokies drove to their 44-yard line. Stopped short of midfield with less than a minute to play, Tech called its second timeout in order to stop the game clock from ticking down. In college football, the clock stops after a team earns a first down, and because Virginia Tech had not earned a first down on the short run, Tech was forced to call the timeout. Following the timeout, the Hokies ran for a first down, penetrating to the NC State 44-yard line. With 53 seconds remaining, Chapman scrambled out of bounds on a short run. Another short run brought the Hokies to the State 36-yard line, and the Hokies called their final timeout to stop the clock. A few plays later, Tech ran a short running play that kept the clock running down. With just 33 seconds remaining and no other way to stop the clock, Tech's Maurice Williams questionably stayed down with a leg cramp and the referees stopped the clock to allow the injured player to receive assistance from athletic trainers before the next play. Facing fourth down and needing three yards for drive-continuing first down, Chapman passed for a first down at the State 29-yard line with 15 seconds remaining in the game. On the game's next play, Tech committed a holding penalty, which pushed the Hokies 10 yards further away from the end zone, out of field goal range, with 11 seconds remaining.

On the game's next play, Chapman passed the ball deep, toward the end zone. Though the pass fell incomplete, a game official called a 15-yard pass interference penalty against NC State. This moved the ball to the NC State 23-yard line and forced Tech kicker Chris Kinzer to attempt a potentially game-winning 40-yard field goal with four seconds remaining. Though NC State coach Dick Sheridan called a timeout in an attempt to ice Chris Kinzer, the kick sailed through the uprights and Virginia Tech won a 25–24 victory as time expired.

== Statistical summary ==
Statistical comparison
	VT	NCST
1st downs	29	16
Total yards	487	287
Passing yards	200	155
Rushing yards	287	132
Penalties	5–51	3–25

In recognition of their performance in a losing effort, NC State quarterback Erik Kramer was named the game's offensive most valuable player, while on defense, NC State cornerback Derrick Taylor won the honor. Kramer finished the game having completed 12 of his 19 passes for 155 yards. On the opposite side of the field, Virginia Tech quarterback Eric Chapman finished with 20 completions out of 30 attempts for two touchdowns and 200 passing yards.

Virginia Tech running back Maurice Williams' 77-yard run on the second play of the game remains the longest play from scrimmage in the Peach Bowl (today the Chick-fil-A Bowl), and Virginia Tech also set the current record for the most first downs in a Peach Bowl (29). Williams finished the game with 16 carries for 129 yards, and was the game's leading rusher. The second-place rusher was fellow Hokie running back Hunter, who ran with the ball 22 times for 113 yards. NC State's leading rusher was fullback Mal Crite, who finished the game with 14 carries for 101 yards.

== Postgame effects ==
Virginia Tech's win brought it to a final 1986 record of 9–2–1, later modified to 10–1–1 two years later after a Temple forfeit, while NC State's loss took it to a final record of 8–3–1. The victory was Virginia Tech's first bowl win in school history and was the team's only such win until 1993, when Tech defeated Indiana University in the 1993 Independence Bowl.

Peach Bowl officials pronounced themselves pleased with both the turnout for the game and the action on the field. Though traffic jams snarled attendees' arrival to the stadium, there were only 5,366 no-shows out of 58,212 tickets sold. Following the game, Peach Bowl chairman Ira Hefter announced that the bowl would seek corporate sponsorship and a potential television broadcast deal with a major American television network. The takeover by the chamber of commerce also proved to be successful, as the 1986 game made a small profit. This was an improvement over the three previous Peach Bowls, which lost more than $170,000. The sellout also confirmed that the game would continue to be held annually instead of being abandoned, as sportswriters had speculated prior to the 1986 game.

Tech kicker Chris Kinzer, who kicked the game-winning field goal, did not go on to play in the National Football League despite predictions that he might do so. He attended several NFL teams' tryouts, but a contract to play in the league never materialized. He sold insurance for several years, then reentered school and graduated from Virginia Tech in 1994 with a degree.
