= 1986 Maryland Terrapins football team =

American college football season

1986 Maryland Terrapins football
- Conference: Atlantic Coast Conference
- Record: 5–5–1 (2–3–1 ACC)
- Head coach: Bobby Ross (5th season)
- Offensive coordinator: Ralph Friedgen (5th season)
- Captains: Alvin Blount; Chuck Faucette; Bruce Mesner
- Home stadium: Byrd Stadium

1986 Atlantic Coast Conference football standings
	Conf.					Overall
Team	W		L		T	W		L		T
No. 17 Clemson $	5	–	1	–	1	8	–	2	–	2
NC State	5	–	2	–	0	8	–	3	–	1
North Carolina	5	–	2	–	0	7	–	4	–	1
Georgia Tech	3	–	3	–	0	5	–	5	–	1
Maryland	2	–	3	–	1	5	–	5	–	1
Wake Forest	2	–	5	–	0	5	–	6	–	0
Duke	2	–	5	–	0	4	–	7	–	0
Virginia	2	–	5	–	0	3	–	8	–	0
$ – Conference champion; Rankings from AP Poll

The 1986 Maryland Terrapins football team represented the University of Maryland in the 1986 NCAA Division I-A football season. In their fifth and final season under head coach Bobby Ross, the Terrapins compiled a 5–5–1 record, finished in fifth place in the Atlantic Coast Conference, and outscored their opponents 262 to 211. The team's statistical leaders included Dan Henning with 2,725 passing yards, Alvin Blount with 505 rushing yards, and James Milling with 650 receiving yards.

== Schedule ==
Date	Opponent	Rank	Site	Result	Attendance	Source
September 1	at Pittsburgh*		Pitt Stadium; Pittsburgh, PA	W 10–7	48,120	
September 13	Vanderbilt*		Byrd Stadium; College Park, MD	W 35–21	45,275	
September 20	at West Virginia*		Mountaineer Field; Morgantown, WV (rivalry)	W 24–3	63,500	
September 27	NC State	No. 13	Byrd Stadium; College Park, MD	L 16–28	44,920	
October 11	Boston College*		Byrd Stadium; College Park, MD	L 25–30	45,380	
October 18	Wake Forest		Byrd Stadium; College Park, MD	L 21–27	39,650	
October 25	at Duke		Wallace Wade Stadium; Durham, NC	W 27–19	18,600	
November 1	at North Carolina		Kenan Memorial Stadium; Chapel Hill, NC	L 30–32	46,000	
November 8	at No. 2 Penn State*		Beaver Stadium; University Park, PA (rivalry)	L 15–17	85,561	
November 15	No. 15 Clemson		Memorial Stadium; Baltimore, MD	T 17–17	58,758	
November 28	at Virginia		Scott Stadium; Charlottesville, VA (rivalry)	W 42–10	27,800	
*Non-conference game; Rankings from AP Poll released prior to the game
