= Dick Sheridan =

American football coach and college athletics administrator (1941–2023)

Biographical details
- Born: August 9, 1941; Augusta, Georgia, U.S.
- Died: July 6, 2023 (aged 81) near Garden City, South Carolina, U.S.

Coaching career (HC unless noted)
- 1969–1971: Orangeburg-Wilkinson HS (SC)
- 1972: Airport HS (SC)
- 1973–1977: Furman (QB/WR)
- 1978–1985: Furman
- 1986–1992: NC State

Administrative career (AD unless noted)
- 1983–1985: Furman

Head coaching record
- Overall: 121–52–5 (college); 37–8–1 (high school)
- Bowls: 2–4
- Tournaments: 3–3 (NCAA D-I-AA playoffs)

Accomplishments and honors

Championships
- 6 SoCon (1978, 1980–1983, 1985)

Awards
- AFCA Division I-AA COY (1985); Bobby Dodd Coach of the Year Award (1986); ACC Coach of the Year (1986)
- College Football Hall of Fame; Inducted in 2020 (profile)

Dick Sheridan (August 9, 1941 – July 6, 2023) was an American college football coach and college athletics administrator. He served as the head football coach at Furman University from 1978 to 1985 and North Carolina State University from 1986 to 1992, compiling a career college football record of 121–52–5. A 1964 graduate of the University of South Carolina, Sheridan coached the Furman Paladins to a 69–23–2 record over eight seasons. His Furman teams won six Southern Conference championships and scored two wins over NC State. In 1985, he was named the AFCA Division I-AA Coach of the Year.

A native of Augusta, Georgia, Sheridan graduated from the University of South Carolina in 1964. He began his coaching career in the high school football ranks in the state of South Carolina. Sheridan compiled a record of 37–8–1 as a high school head coach and led Orangeburg-Wilkinson Senior High School to the Class AAAA state title in 1971. He joined the staff at Furman in 1973 as quarterbacks and receivers coach. In his final season at Furman, Sheridan led the Paladins to the 1985 NCAA Division I-AA Football Championship Game, where they lost to Georgia Southern on a touchdown with 10 seconds remaining. Nine days later, he accepted the job at NC State. Sheridan's record at NC State was 52–29–3 over seven seasons and he led the Wolfpack to six bowl games. After resisting overtures from Auburn to replace Pat Dye following the 1992 season, Sheridan announced his resignation as the head coach of NC State on June 29, 1993, citing health issues. Sheridan was inducted into the College Football Hall of Fame as a coach in 2020.

Sheridan died on July 6, 2023, near Garden City, South Carolina, at the age of 81.

== Head coaching record ==
=== College ===
Year	Team	Overall	Conference	Standing	Bowl/playoffs	Coaches^{#}	AP^{°}
Furman Paladins (Southern Conference) (1978–1985)
1978	Furman	8–3	4–1	T–1st			
1979	Furman	5–6	4–3	4th			
1980	Furman	9–1–1	7–0	1st			
1981	Furman	8–3	5–2	1st			
1982	Furman	9–3	6–1	1st	L NCAA Division I-AA First Round		
1983	Furman	10–2–1	6–0–1	1st	L NCAA Division I-AA Semifinal		
1984	Furman	8–3	3–3	4th			
1985	Furman	12–2	6–0	1st	L NCAA Division I-AA Championship		
Furman:		69–23–2	41–10–1				
NC State Wolfpack (Atlantic Coast Conference) (1986–1992)
1986	NC State	8–3–1	5–2	T–2nd	L Peach		
1987	NC State	4–7	4–3	T–3rd			
1988	NC State	8–3–1	4–2–1	3rd	W Peach	17	
1989	NC State	7–5	4–3	T–4th	L Copper		
1990	NC State	7–5	3–4	6th	W All-American		
1991	NC State	9–3	5–2	T–2nd	L Peach	25	24
1992	NC State	9–3–1	6–2	2nd	L Gator^{†}	15	17
NC State:		52–29–3	31–18–1				
Total:		121–52–5					
National championship Conference title Conference division title or championship game berth
^{†}Indicates Bowl Coalition bowl.; ^{#}Rankings from final Coaches Poll.; ^{°}Rankings from final AP Poll.
