= 1986 Marshall Thundering Herd football team =

American college football season

1986 Marshall Thundering Herd football
- Conference: Southern Conference
- Record: 6–4–1 (3–3 SoCon)
- Head coach: George Chaump (1st season)
- Captains: Sam Manos; Tony Bolland
- Home stadium: Fairfield Stadium

1986 Southern Conference football standings
| | Conf. | | | | | Overall |
| Team | W | | L | | T | W | | L | | T |
|---|---|---|---|---|---|---|---|---|---|---|
| No. 6 Appalachian State $^ | 6 | – | 0 | – | 1 | 9 | – | 2 | – | 1 |
| Western Carolina | 5 | – | 2 | – | 0 | 6 | – | 5 | – | 0 |
| No. 15 Furman ^ | 4 | – | 2 | – | 1 | 7 | – | 3 | – | 2 |
| East Tennessee State | 4 | – | 3 | – | 0 | 6 | – | 5 | – | 0 |
| Marshall | 3 | – | 3 | – | 0 | 6 | – | 4 | – | 1 |
| Chattanooga | 2 | – | 4 | – | 0 | 4 | – | 7 | – | 0 |
| VMI | 1 | – | 5 | – | 0 | 1 | – | 10 | – | 0 |
| The Citadel | 0 | – | 6 | – | 0 | 3 | – | 8 | – | 0 |
| Davidson | 0 | – | 4 | – | 0 | 0 | – | 9 | – | 0 |
$ – Conference champion; ^ – NCAA Division I-AA playoff participant; Rankings from NCAA Division I-AA Football Committee poll

The 1986 Marshall Thundering Herd football team was an American football team that represented Marshall University in the Southern Conference (SoCon) during the 1986 NCAA Division I-AA football season. In its first season under head coach George Chaump, the team compiled a 6–4–1 record (3–3 against conference opponents) and played its home games at Fairfield Stadium in Huntington, West Virginia.

== Schedule ==
| Date | Opponent | Rank | Site | Result | Attendance | Source |
|---|---|---|---|---|---|---|
| August 30 | West Virginia Tech* | | Fairfield Stadium; Huntington, WV | W 42–0 | | |
| September 6 | Morehead State* | | Fairfield Stadium; Huntington, WV | L 10–19 | 15,542 | |
| September 13 | at Ohio* | | Peden Stadium; Athens, OH (rivalry) | W 21–7 | 16,400 | |
| September 20 | No. 11 Eastern Kentucky* | | Fairfield Stadium; Huntington, WV | T 13–13 | | |
| September 27 | No. 3 Furman | | Fairfield Stadium; Huntington, WV | L 10–38 | 12,279 | |
| October 4 | at VMI | | Alumni Memorial Field; Lexington, VA | W 16–9 | 7,000 | |
| October 18 | at East Tennessee State | | Memorial Center; Johnson City, TN | W 34–19 | | |
| October 25 | Davidson^{†} | | Fairfield Stadium; Huntington, WV | W 63–14 | 12,130 | |
| November 1 | Chattanooga | No. 20 | Fairfield Stadium; Huntington, WV | W 41–20 | 11,011 | |
| November 8 | No. 7 Appalachian State | No. 17 | Fairfield Stadium; Huntington, WV (rivalry) | L 17–27 | 12,285 | |
| November 15 | at Western Carolina | | E. J. Whitmire Stadium; Cullowhee, NC | L 20–33 | 5,882 | |
*Non-conference game; ^{†}Homecoming; Rankings from NCAA Division I-AA Football Committee Poll released prior to the game
