= 1986 Chattanooga Moccasins football team =

American college football season

1986 Chattanooga Moccasins football
- Conference: Southern Conference
- Record: 4–7 (2–4 SoCon)
- Head coach: Buddy Nix (3rd season)
- Offensive coordinator: Joe D'Alessandris (1st season)
- Captains: Tim Couch; Spanky Thomas
- Home stadium: Chamberlain Field

1986 Southern Conference football standings
	Conf.					Overall
Team	W		L		T	W		L		T
No. 6 Appalachian State $^	6	–	0	–	1	9	–	2	–	1
Western Carolina	5	–	2	–	0	6	–	5	–	0
No. 15 Furman ^	4	–	2	–	1	7	–	3	–	2
East Tennessee State	4	–	3	–	0	6	–	5	–	0
Marshall	3	–	3	–	0	6	–	4	–	1
Chattanooga	2	–	4	–	0	4	–	7	–	0
VMI	1	–	5	–	0	1	–	10	–	0
The Citadel	0	–	6	–	0	3	–	8	–	0
Davidson	0	–	4	–	0	0	–	9	–	0
$ – Conference champion; ^ – NCAA Division I-AA playoff participant; Rankings from NCAA Division I-AA Football Committee poll

The 1986 Chattanooga Moccasins football team represented the University of Tennessee at Chattanooga as a member of the Southern Conference (SoCon) in the 1986 NCAA Division I-AA football season. The Moccasins were led by third-year head coach Buddy Nix and played their home games at Chamberlain Field. They finished the season 4–7 overall 2–4 in SoCon play to place in sixth.

== Schedule ==
Date	Opponent	Site	Result	Attendance	Source
September 6	at No. 14 (I-A) Auburn*	Jordan-Hare Stadium; Auburn, AL	L 14–42	58,000	
September 13	at No. 13 Eastern Kentucky*	Hanger Field; Richmond, KY	L 3–23	14,400	
September 20	Tennessee Tech*	Chamberlain Field; Chattanooga, TN	W 33–3	9,487	
September 27	at No. 4 Georgia Southern*	Paulson Stadium; Statesboro, GA	L 14–34	15,235	
October 11	No. 6 Appalachian State^{†}	Chamberlain Field; Chattanooga, TN	L 15–20	9,044	
October 18	at The Citadel	Johnson Hagood Stadium; Charleston, SC	W 42–7	10,584	
October 25	East Tennessee State	Chamberlain Field; Chattanooga, TN	L 17–18	3,127	
November 1	at No. 20 Marshall	Fairfield Stadium; Huntington, WV	L 20–41	11,011	
November 8	Western Carolina	Chamberlain Field; Chattanooga, TN	W 34–7	6,063	
November 15	Furman	Chamberlain Field; Chattanooga, TN	L 10–21	7,127	
November 22	at Western Kentucky*	L. T. Smith Stadium; Bowling Green, KY	W 21–17	4,000	
*Non-conference game; ^{†}Homecoming; Rankings from NCAA Division I-AA Football Committee Poll released prior to the game
