= 1986 The Citadel Bulldogs football team =

American college football season

1986 The Citadel Bulldogs football
- Conference: Southern Conference
- Record: 3–8 (0–6 SoCon)
- Head coach: Tom Moore (4th season)
- Home stadium: Johnson Hagood Stadium

1986 Southern Conference football standings
| | Conf. | | | | | Overall |
| Team | W | | L | | T | W | | L | | T |
|---|---|---|---|---|---|---|---|---|---|---|
| No. 6 Appalachian State $^ | 6 | – | 0 | – | 1 | 9 | – | 2 | – | 1 |
| Western Carolina | 5 | – | 2 | – | 0 | 6 | – | 5 | – | 0 |
| No. 15 Furman ^ | 4 | – | 2 | – | 1 | 7 | – | 3 | – | 2 |
| East Tennessee State | 4 | – | 3 | – | 0 | 6 | – | 5 | – | 0 |
| Marshall | 3 | – | 3 | – | 0 | 6 | – | 4 | – | 1 |
| Chattanooga | 2 | – | 4 | – | 0 | 4 | – | 7 | – | 0 |
| VMI | 1 | – | 5 | – | 0 | 1 | – | 10 | – | 0 |
| The Citadel | 0 | – | 6 | – | 0 | 3 | – | 8 | – | 0 |
| Davidson | 0 | – | 4 | – | 0 | 0 | – | 9 | – | 0 |
$ – Conference champion; ^ – NCAA Division I-AA playoff participant; Rankings from NCAA Division I-AA Football Committee poll

The 1986 The Citadel Bulldogs football team represented The Citadel, The Military College of South Carolina in the 1986 NCAA Division I-AA football season. Tom Moore served as head coach for the fourth season. The Bulldogs played as members of the Southern Conference and played home games at Johnson Hagood Stadium.

== Schedule ==
| Date | Opponent | Site | Result | Attendance | Source |
|---|---|---|---|---|---|
| September 6 | at North Carolina* | Kenan Memorial Stadium; Chapel Hill, NC | L 14–45 | 48,250 | |
| September 13 | Northeastern* | Johnson Hagood Stadium; Charleston, SC | W 24–14 | 14,583 | |
| September 20 | Presbyterian* | Johnson Hagood Stadium; Charleston, SC | W 15–13 | 18,197 | |
| September 27 | at No. 10 Appalachian State | Conrad Stadium; Boone, NC | L 10–33 | 20,800 | |
| October 4 | at Clemson* | Memorial Stadium; Clemson, SC | L 0–24 | 75,540 | |
| October 11 | VMI | Johnson Hagood Stadium; Charleston, SC (Military Classic of the South) | L 30–47 | 17,953 | |
| October 18 | Chattanooga | Johnson Hagood Stadium; Charleston, SC | L 7–42 | 10,583 | |
| November 1 | at Western Carolina | E. J. Whitmire Stadium; Cullowhee, NC | L 12–27 | 5,618 | |
| November 8 | Wofford* | Johnson Hagood Stadium; Charleston, SC (rivalry) | W 20–6 | 8,178 | |
| November 15 | East Tennessee State^{†} | Johnson Hagood Stadium; Charleston, SC | L 9–35 | 13,854 | |
| November 22 | at No. 19 Furman | Paladin Stadium; Greenville, SC (rivalry) | L 14–37 | 15,465 | |
*Non-conference game; ^{†}Homecoming; Rankings from NCAA Division I-AA Football Committee Poll released prior to the game
