= 1986 VMI Keydets football team =

American college football season

1986 VMI Keydets football
- Conference: Southern Conference
- Record: 1–10 (1–5 SoCon)
- Head coach: Eddie Williamson (2nd season)
- Home stadium: Alumni Memorial Field

1986 Southern Conference football standings
	Conf.					Overall
Team	W		L		T	W		L		T
No. 6 Appalachian State $^	6	–	0	–	1	9	–	2	–	1
Western Carolina	5	–	2	–	0	6	–	5	–	0
No. 15 Furman ^	4	–	2	–	1	7	–	3	–	2
East Tennessee State	4	–	3	–	0	6	–	5	–	0
Marshall	3	–	3	–	0	6	–	4	–	1
Chattanooga	2	–	4	–	0	4	–	7	–	0
VMI	1	–	5	–	0	1	–	10	–	0
The Citadel	0	–	6	–	0	3	–	8	–	0
Davidson	0	–	4	–	0	0	–	9	–	0
$ – Conference champion; ^ – NCAA Division I-AA playoff participant; Rankings from NCAA Division I-AA Football Committee poll

The 1986 VMI Keydets football team was an American football team that represented the Virginia Military Institute (VMI) as a member of the Southern Conference (SoCon) during the 1986 NCAA Division I-AA football season. In their second year under head coach Eddie Williamson, the team compiled an overall record of 1–10 with a mark of 1–5 in conference play, placing seventh in the SoCon.

== Schedule ==
Date	Opponent	Site	Result	Attendance	Source
September 13	at William & Mary*	Cary Field; Williamsburg, VA (rivalry)	L 22–37	10,100	
September 20	Furman	Alumni Memorial Field; Lexington, VA	L 3–34	7,500	
September 27	at James Madison*	JMU Stadium; Harrisonburg, VA	L 7–39	11,019	
October 4	Marshall	Alumni Memorial Field; Lexington, VA	L 9–16	7,000	
October 11	at The Citadel	Johnson Hagood Stadium; Charleston, SC (rivalry)	W 47–30	17,953	
October 18	at Richmond*	City Stadium; Richmond, VA (rivalry)	L 9–40	18,712	
October 25	at Western Carolina	E. J. Whitmire Stadium; Cullowhee, NC	L 0–34	3,500	
November 1	at UCF*	Alumni Memorial Field; Lexington, VA	L 9–38	3,200	
November 8	at Georgia Tech*	Grant Field; Atlanta, GA	L 6–52	23,542	
November 15	No. 7 Appalachian State	Alumni Memorial Field; Lexington, VA	L 6–19	3,000	
November 22	at East Tennessee State	Memorial Center; Johnson City, TN	L 20–31	5,425	
*Non-conference game; Rankings from NCAA Division I-AA Football Committee Poll released prior to the game
