= 1986 North Carolina Tar Heels football team =

American college football season

1986 North Carolina Tar Heels football

Aloha Bowl, L 21–30 vs. Arizona
- Conference: Atlantic Coast Conference
- Record: 7–4–1 (5–2 ACC)
- Head coach: Dick Crum (9th season)
- Captain: Walter Bailey
- Home stadium: Kenan Memorial Stadium

1986 Atlantic Coast Conference football standings
	Conf.					Overall
Team	W		L		T	W		L		T
No. 17 Clemson $	5	–	1	–	1	8	–	2	–	2
NC State	5	–	2	–	0	8	–	3	–	1
North Carolina	5	–	2	–	0	7	–	4	–	1
Georgia Tech	3	–	3	–	0	5	–	5	–	1
Maryland	2	–	3	–	1	5	–	5	–	1
Wake Forest	2	–	5	–	0	5	–	6	–	0
Duke	2	–	5	–	0	4	–	7	–	0
Virginia	2	–	5	–	0	3	–	8	–	0
$ – Conference champion; Rankings from AP Poll

The 1986 North Carolina Tar Heels football team represented the University of North Carolina at Chapel Hill during the 1986 NCAA Division I-A football season. The Tar Heels were led by ninth-year head coach Dick Crum and played their home games at Kenan Memorial Stadium in Chapel Hill, North Carolina. They competed as members of the Atlantic Coast Conference, finishing tied for second. North Carolina was invited to the 1986 Aloha Bowl, where they lost to Arizona.

== Schedule ==
Date	Time	Opponent	Rank	Site	TV	Result	Attendance	Source
September 6	12:15 p.m.	The Citadel*		Kenan Memorial Stadium; Chapel Hill, NC		W 45–14	48,250	
September 13	2:30 p.m.	at Kansas*		Memorial Stadium; Lawrence, KS		W 20–0	40,200	
September 20	12:20 p.m.	at No. 15 Florida State*		Doak Campbell Stadium; Tallahassee, FL	WTBS	T 10–10	57,611	
October 4	12:15 p.m.	Georgia Tech		Kenan Memorial Stadium; Chapel Hill, NC		W 21–20	50,000	
October 11	1:00 p.m.	at Wake Forest		Groves Stadium; Winston-Salem, NC (rivalry)		W 40–30	31,150	
October 18	12:15 p.m.	NC State	No. 18	Kenan Memorial Stadium; Chapel Hill, NC (rivalry)		L 34–35	51,550	
October 25	8:00 p.m.	at No. 12 LSU*		Tiger Stadium; Baton Rouge, LA	TigerVision	L 3–30	78,301	
November 1	12:15 p.m.	Maryland		Kenan Memorial Stadium; Chapel Hill, NC		W 32–30	46,000	
November 8	1:00 p.m.	at No. 20 Clemson		Memorial Stadium; Clemson, SC	CBS	L 10–38	79,210	
November 15	12:15 p.m.	Virginia		Kenan Memorial Stadium; Chapel Hill, NC (South's Oldest Rivalry)	JPT	W 27–7	28,000	
November 22	1:30 p.m.	at Duke		Wallace Wade Stadium; Durham, NC (Victory Bell)		W 42–35	33,500	
December 27	3:45 p.m.	vs. No. 16 Arizona*		Aloha Stadium; Halawa, HI (Aloha Bowl)	ABC	L 21–30	26,743	
*Non-conference game; Rankings from AP Poll released prior to the game; All times are in Eastern time

== Personnel ==
1986 North Carolina Tar Heels football team roster
Players
Coaches
Offense

Pos.	#	Name	Class
OL		Harris Barton
OL		Pat Crowley
RB		Torin Dorn
RB		Derrick Fenner	So
OL		Jeff Garnica
DL		Tim Goad
QB		Jonathan Hall
OL		Darrell Hamilton
RB		William Humes
OL		Creighton Incorminias
TE		John Keller
WR		Eric Lewis
RB		Brad Lopp
WR		Randy Marriott
QB		Mark Maye
TE		Daryl Parham
OL		Ralph Phifer
WR		Quinton Smith
RB		Eric Starr
OL		Steve Steinbacher
WR		Eric Streater
RB		James Thompson
TE		Dave Truitt
QB		Dan Cortese

Defense

Pos.	#	Name	Class
DL		Carlton Bailey
DB		Walter Bailey
DB		Skeet Baldwin
DB		Danny Burmeister
DL		Ron Burton
DB		Norris Davis
DL		Reuben Davis
LB		Leonard Dempsey
DB		Derrick Donald
DB		Howard Feggins
DB		Jim Jauch
DL		Kubi Kalombo
DL		Noel McEachern
LB		Brett Rudolph
DB		Dan Vooletich
LB		Mitch Wike

Special teams

Pos.	#	Name	Class
K		Lee Gliarmis
P, K		Danny Miller

Head coach

- Dick Crum

Coordinators/assistant coaches

Legend

- (C) Team captain
- (S) Suspended
- (I) Ineligible
- Injured
- Redshirt
