= 1986 Davidson Wildcats football team =

American college football season

1986 Davidson Wildcats football
- Conference: Southern Conference
- Record: 0–9 (0–6 SoCon)
- Head coach: Vic Gatto (2nd season)
- Home stadium: Richardson Stadium

1986 Southern Conference football standings
	Conf.					Overall
Team	W		L		T	W		L		T
No. 6 Appalachian State $^	6	–	0	–	1	9	–	2	–	1
Western Carolina	5	–	2	–	0	6	–	5	–	0
No. 15 Furman ^	4	–	2	–	1	7	–	3	–	2
East Tennessee State	4	–	3	–	0	6	–	5	–	0
Marshall	3	–	3	–	0	6	–	4	–	1
Chattanooga	2	–	4	–	0	4	–	7	–	0
VMI	1	–	5	–	0	1	–	10	–	0
The Citadel	0	–	6	–	0	3	–	8	–	0
Davidson	0	–	4	–	0	0	–	9	–	0
$ – Conference champion; ^ – NCAA Division I-AA playoff participant; Rankings from NCAA Division I-AA Football Committee poll

The 1986 Davidson Wildcats football team represented Davidson College as a member of the Southern Conference during the 1986 NCAA Division I-AA football season. Led by second-year head coach Vic Gatto, the Wildcats compiled an overall record of 0–9 with a mark of 0–6 in conference play, placing last out of nine teams in the SoCon. Although not SoCon members, their games against Bucknell and Lafayette were designated Southern Conference games.

== Schedule ==
Date	Opponent	Site	Result	Attendance	Source
September 6	Lenoir–Rhyne*	Richardson Stadium; Davidson, NC	L 14–31	4,700	
September 13	Wofford*	Richardson Stadium; Davidson, NC	L 10–20	3,000	
September 20	at East Tennessee State	Memorial Center; Johnson City, TN	L 6–41		
October 4	at No. 8 Appalachian State	Conrad Stadium; Boone, NC	L 6–63	21,217	
October 11	Bucknell	Richardson Stadium; Davidson, NC	L 7–27	1,000	
October 18	Lafayette^{†}	Richardson Stadium; Davidson, NC	L 14–51	2,700	
October 25	at Marshall	Fairfield Stadium; Huntington, WV	L 14–63	12,130	
November 8	at Furman	Paladin Stadium; Greenville, SC	L 0–59	8,989	
November 15	at Catawba*	Shuford Stadium; Salisbury, NC	L 28–51	300	
*Non-conference game; ^{†}Homecoming; Rankings from NCAA Division I-AA Football Committee Poll released prior to the game
