= 1986 Furman Paladins football team =

American college football season

1986 Furman Paladins football

NCAA Division I-AA First Round, L 10–23 vs. Eastern Kentucky
- Conference: Southern Conference
- Record: 7–3–2 (4–2–1 SoCon)
- Head coach: Jimmy Satterfield (1st season)
- Captains: Jerome Norris; Steve Squire; Tim Stepp; Robbie Gardner
- Home stadium: Paladin Stadium

1986 Southern Conference football standings
	Conf.					Overall
Team	W		L		T	W		L		T
No. 6 Appalachian State $^	6	–	0	–	1	9	–	2	–	1
Western Carolina	5	–	2	–	0	6	–	5	–	0
No. 15 Furman ^	4	–	2	–	1	7	–	3	–	2
East Tennessee State	4	–	3	–	0	6	–	5	–	0
Marshall	3	–	3	–	0	6	–	4	–	1
Chattanooga	2	–	4	–	0	4	–	7	–	0
VMI	1	–	5	–	0	1	–	10	–	0
The Citadel	0	–	6	–	0	3	–	8	–	0
Davidson	0	–	4	–	0	0	–	9	–	0
$ – Conference champion; ^ – NCAA Division I-AA playoff participant; Rankings from NCAA Division I-AA Football Committee poll

The 1986 Furman Paladins football team was an American football team that represented Furman University as a member of the Southern Conference (SoCon) during the 1986 NCAA Division I-AA football season. In their first year under head coach Jimmy Satterfield, the Paladins compiled an overall record of 7–3–2 with a conference mark of 4–2–1, placing third in the SoCon.

== Schedule ==
Date	Opponent	Rank	Site	Result	Attendance	Source
September 6	South Carolina State*	No. 9	Paladin Stadium; Greenville, SC	W 34–7	15,085	
September 13	at Georgia Tech*	No. 9	Grant Field; Atlanta, GA	T 17–17	33,352	
September 20	at VMI	No. 3	Alumni Memorial Field; Lexington, VA	W 34–3	7,500	
September 27	at Marshall	No. 3	Fairfield Stadium; Huntington, WV	W 38–10	12,279	
October 4	at East Tennessee State	No. 3	Memorial Center; Johnson City, TN	L 13–25	7,550	
October 18	Western Carolina	No. 11	Paladin Stadium; Greenville, SC	L 13–19	15,245	
October 25	No. 5 Appalachian State	No. T–18	Conrad Stadium; Boone, NC	T 17–17	9,878	
November 1	Presbyterian*		Paladin Stadium; Greenville, SC	W 45–31	18,607	
November 8	Davidson		Paladin Stadium; Greenville, SC	W 59–0	8,989	
November 15	at Chattanooga		Chamberlain Field; Chattanooga, TN	W 21–10	7,127	
November 22	The Citadel	No. 19	Paladin Stadium; Greenville, SC (rivalry)	W 37–14	15,465	
November 29	No. 10 Eastern Kentucky	No. 15	Paladin Stadium; Greenville, SC (NCAA Division I-AA First Round)	L 10–23	9,121	
*Non-conference game; Rankings from NCAA Division I-AA Football Committee Poll released prior to the game
