= 1986 Appalachian State Mountaineers football team =

American college football season

1986 Appalachian State Mountaineers football

SoCon champion

NCAA Division I-AA First Round, L 26–28 vs. Nicholls State
- Conference: Southern Conference
- Record: 9–2–1 (6–0–1 SoCon)
- Head coach: Sparky Woods (3rd season)
- Home stadium: Conrad Stadium

1986 Southern Conference football standings
	Conf.					Overall
Team	W		L		T	W		L		T
No. 6 Appalachian State $^	6	–	0	–	1	9	–	2	–	1
Western Carolina	5	–	2	–	0	6	–	5	–	0
No. 15 Furman ^	4	–	2	–	1	7	–	3	–	2
East Tennessee State	4	–	3	–	0	6	–	5	–	0
Marshall	3	–	3	–	0	6	–	4	–	1
Chattanooga	2	–	4	–	0	4	–	7	–	0
VMI	1	–	5	–	0	1	–	10	–	0
The Citadel	0	–	6	–	0	3	–	8	–	0
Davidson	0	–	4	–	0	0	–	9	–	0
$ – Conference champion; ^ – NCAA Division I-AA playoff participant; Rankings from NCAA Division I-AA Football Committee poll

The 1986 Appalachian State Mountaineers football team was an American football team that represented Appalachian State University as a member of the Southern Conference (SoCon) during the 1986 NCAA Division I-AA football season. In their third year under head coach Sparky Woods, the Mountaineers compiled an overall record of 9–2–1 with a conference mark of 6–0–1, winning the SoCon title. Appalachian State advanced to the NCAA Division I-AA Football Championship playoff, where they lost in the first round to Nicholls State.

== Schedule ==
Date	Opponent	Rank	Site	Result	Attendance	Source
August 30	Western Carolina		Conrad Stadium; Boone, NC (rivalry)	W 17–13	22,618	
September 6	at Wake Forest*		Groves Stadium; Winston-Salem, NC	L 13–21	28,700	
September 13	East Tennessee State		Conrad Stadium; Boone, NC	W 40–14	14,200	
September 27	The Citadel	No. 10	Conrad Stadium; Boone, NC	W 33–10	20,800	
October 4	Davidson	No. 8	Conrad Stadium; Boone, NC	W 63–6	21,217	
October 11	at Chattanooga	No. 6	Chamberlain Field; Chattanooga, TN	W 20–15	9,044	
October 18	at James Madison*	No. 6	JMU Stadium; Harrisonburg, VA	W 21–20	12,600	
October 25	No. T–18 Furman	No. 5	Conrad Stadium; Boone, NC	T 17–17	9,878	
November 8	at No. 17 Marshall	No. 7	Fairfield Stadium; Huntington, WV (rivalry)	W 27–17	12,285	
November 15	at VMI	No. 7	Alumni Memorial Field; Lexington, VA	W 19–6	3,000	
November 22	No. 13 North Carolina A&T*	No. 7	Conrad Stadium; Boone, NC	W 55–9	14,700	
November 29	No. 12 Nicholls State*	No. 6	Conrad Stadium; Boone, NC (NCAA Division I-AA First Round)	L 26–28	7,767	
*Non-conference game; Rankings from NCAA Division I-AA Football Committee Poll released prior to the game
