= 1986 NC State Wolfpack football team =

American college football season

1986 NC State Wolfpack football

Peach Bowl, L 24–25 vs. Virginia Tech
- Conference: Atlantic Coast Conference
- Record: 8–3–1 (5–2 ACC)
- Head coach: Dick Sheridan (1st season)
- Home stadium: Carter Stadium

1986 Atlantic Coast Conference football standings
	Conf.					Overall
Team	W		L		T	W		L		T
No. 17 Clemson $	5	–	1	–	1	8	–	2	–	2
NC State	5	–	2	–	0	8	–	3	–	1
North Carolina	5	–	2	–	0	7	–	4	–	1
Georgia Tech	3	–	3	–	0	5	–	5	–	1
Maryland	2	–	3	–	1	5	–	5	–	1
Wake Forest	2	–	5	–	0	5	–	6	–	0
Duke	2	–	5	–	0	4	–	7	–	0
Virginia	2	–	5	–	0	3	–	8	–	0
$ – Conference champion; Rankings from AP Poll

The 1986 NC State Wolfpack football team represented North Carolina State University during the 1986 NCAA Division I-A football season. The team's head coach was Dick Sheridan. NC State has been a member of the Atlantic Coast Conference (ACC) since the league's inception in 1953. The Wolfpack played its home games in 1986 at Carter–Finley Stadium in Raleigh, North Carolina, which has been NC State football's home stadium since 1966.

== Schedule ==
Date	Opponent	Rank	Site	TV	Result	Attendance	Source
September 6	East Carolina*		Carter–Finley Stadium; Raleigh, NC (rivalry)		W 38–10	58,650	
September 13	Pittsburgh*		Carter–Finley Stadium; Raleigh, NC		T 14–14	47,200	
September 20	Wake Forest		Carter–Finley Stadium; Raleigh, NC (rivalry)		W 42–38	37,400	
September 27	at No. 13 Maryland		Byrd Stadium; College Park, MD		W 28–16	44,920	
October 11	at Georgia Tech	No. 17	Grant Field; Atlanta, GA	Raycom	L 21–59	24,110	
October 18	at No. 18 North Carolina		Kenan Memorial Stadium; Chapel Hill, NC (rivalry)	Raycom	W 35–34	51,550	
October 25	No. 16 Clemson	No. 20	Carter–Finley Stadium; Raleigh, NC (Textile Bowl)	CBS	W 27–3	51,300	
November 1	South Carolina*	No. 16	Carter–Finley Stadium; Raleigh, NC		W 23–22	50,230	
November 8	at Virginia	No. 15	Scott Stadium; Charlottesville, VA	Raycom	L 16–20	30,500	
November 15	Duke		Carter–Finley Stadium; Raleigh, NC (rivalry)		W 29–15	41,800	
November 22	Western Carolina*		Carter–Finley Stadium; Raleigh, NC		W 31–18	39,200	
December 31	vs. Virginia Tech*	No. 18	Atlanta–Fulton County Stadium; Atlanta, GA (Peach Bowl)		L 24–25	53,668	
*Non-conference game; Rankings from AP Poll released prior to the game
