= 1986 Clemson Tigers football team =

American college football season

1986 Clemson Tigers football

ACC champion Gator Bowl champion

Gator Bowl, W 27–21 vs. Stanford
- Conference: Atlantic Coast Conference

Ranking
- Coaches: No. 19
- AP: No. 17
- Record: 8–2–2 (5–1–1 ACC)
- Head coach: Danny Ford (8th full, 9th overall season)
- Offensive coordinator: Jack Crowe (1st season)
- Captains: Terrence Flagler; Terence Mack
- Home stadium: Memorial Stadium

1986 Atlantic Coast Conference football standings
| | Conf. | | | | | Overall |
| Team | W | | L | | T | W | | L | | T |
|---|---|---|---|---|---|---|---|---|---|---|
| No. 17 Clemson $ | 5 | – | 1 | – | 1 | 8 | – | 2 | – | 2 |
| NC State | 5 | – | 2 | – | 0 | 8 | – | 3 | – | 1 |
| North Carolina | 5 | – | 2 | – | 0 | 7 | – | 4 | – | 1 |
| Georgia Tech | 3 | – | 3 | – | 0 | 5 | – | 5 | – | 1 |
| Maryland | 2 | – | 3 | – | 1 | 5 | – | 5 | – | 1 |
| Wake Forest | 2 | – | 5 | – | 0 | 5 | – | 6 | – | 0 |
| Duke | 2 | – | 5 | – | 0 | 4 | – | 7 | – | 0 |
| Virginia | 2 | – | 5 | – | 0 | 3 | – | 8 | – | 0 |
$ – Conference champion; Rankings from AP Poll

The 1986 Clemson Tigers football team was an American football team that represented Clemson University in the Atlantic Coast Conference (ACC) during the 1986 NCAA Division I-A football season. In its ninth season under head coach Danny Ford, the team compiled an 8–2–2 record (5–1–1 against conference opponents), won the ACC championship, defeated Stanford in the 1986 Gator Bowl, and outscored opponents by a total of 296 to 187. The team played its home games at Memorial Stadium in Clemson, South Carolina.

Terrence Flagler and Terence Mack were the team captains. The team's statistical leaders included quarterback Rodney Williams with 1,245 passing yards, Terrence Flagler with 1,258 rushing yards and 78 points scored (13 touchdowns), and Ray Williams with 280 receiving yards.

== Schedule ==
| Date | Opponent | Rank | Site | Result | Attendance | Source |
|---|---|---|---|---|---|---|
| September 13 | Virginia Tech* | | Memorial Stadium; Clemson, SC | L 14–20 | 75,930 | |
| September 20 | at No. 14 Georgia* | | Sanford Stadium; Athens, GA (rivalry) | W 31–28 | 81,377 | |
| September 27 | at Georgia Tech | | Grant Field; Atlanta, GA (rivalry) | W 27–3 | 46,062 | |
| October 4 | The Citadel* | | Memorial Stadium; Clemson, SC | W 24–0 | 75,540 | |
| October 11 | at Virginia | No. 20 | Scott Stadium; Charlottesville, VA | W 31–17 | 44,300 | |
| October 18 | Duke^{†} | No. 17 | Memorial Stadium; Clemson, SC | W 35–3 | 81,320 | |
| October 25 | at No. 20 NC State | No. 16 | Carter–Finley Stadium; Raleigh, NC (Textile Bowl) | L 3–27 | 51,300 | |
| November 1 | at Wake Forest | | Groves Stadium; Winston-Salem, NC | W 28–20 | 20,370 | |
| November 8 | North Carolina | No. 20 | Memorial Stadium; Clemson, SC | W 38–10 | 79,210 | |
| November 15 | at Maryland | No. 15 | Memorial Stadium; Baltimore, MD | T 17–17 | 58,758 | |
| November 22 | South Carolina* | No. 19 | Memorial Stadium; Clemson, SC (rivalry) | T 21–21 | 82,500 | |
| December 27 | vs. No. 20 Stanford* | | Gator Bowl Stadium; Jacksonville, FL (Gator Bowl) | W 27–21 | 80,104 | |
*Non-conference game; ^{†}Homecoming; Rankings from AP Poll released prior to the game

== Personnel ==
1986 Clemson Tigers football team roster
Players
Coaches
Offense

| Pos. | # | Name | Class |
|---|---|---|---|
| RB | | Terrence Flagler (C) |
| QB | 13 | Rodney Williams | So |

Defense

| Pos. | # | Name | Class |

Special teams

| Pos. | # | Name | Class |

Head coach

- Danny Ford

Coordinators/assistant coaches

- Jack Crowe – Offensive coordinator

Legend

- (C) Team captain
- (S) Suspended
- (I) Ineligible
- Injured
- Redshirt

Roster
