= 1986 Duke Blue Devils football team =

American college football season

1986 Duke Blue Devils football
- Conference: Atlantic Coast Conference
- Record: 4–7 (2–5 ACC)
- Head coach: Steve Sloan (4th season)
- Offensive coordinator: Tommy Bowden (2nd season)
- Defensive coordinator: Richard Bell (4th season)
- MVP: Mike Junkin
- Captains: Paul Constantino; Mike Junkin
- Home stadium: Wallace Wade Stadium

1986 Atlantic Coast Conference football standings
| | Conf. | | | | | Overall |
| Team | W | | L | | T | W | | L | | T |
|---|---|---|---|---|---|---|---|---|---|---|
| No. 17 Clemson $ | 5 | – | 1 | – | 1 | 8 | – | 2 | – | 2 |
| NC State | 5 | – | 2 | – | 0 | 8 | – | 3 | – | 1 |
| North Carolina | 5 | – | 2 | – | 0 | 7 | – | 4 | – | 1 |
| Georgia Tech | 3 | – | 3 | – | 0 | 5 | – | 5 | – | 1 |
| Maryland | 2 | – | 3 | – | 1 | 5 | – | 5 | – | 1 |
| Wake Forest | 2 | – | 5 | – | 0 | 5 | – | 6 | – | 0 |
| Duke | 2 | – | 5 | – | 0 | 4 | – | 7 | – | 0 |
| Virginia | 2 | – | 5 | – | 0 | 3 | – | 8 | – | 0 |
$ – Conference champion; Rankings from AP Poll

The 1986 Duke Blue Devils football team represented Duke University as a member of the Atlantic Coast Conference (ACC) during the 1986 NCAA Division I-A football season. Led by fourth-year head coach Steve Sloan, the Blue Devils compiled an overall record of 4–7 with a mark of 2–5 in conference play, and tied for sixth place in the ACC. Duke played home games at Wallace Wade Stadium in Durham, North Carolina.

== Schedule ==
| Date | Opponent | Site | Result | Attendance | Source |
|---|---|---|---|---|---|
| September 6 | at Northwestern* | Dyche Stadium; Evanston, IL | W 17–6 | 21,514 | |
| September 13 | at No. 19 Georgia* | Sanford Stadium; Athens, GA | L 7–31 | 80,420 | |
| September 20 | Ohio* | Wallace Wade Stadium; Durham, NC | W 22–7 | 28,500 | |
| September 27 | Virginia | Wallace Wade Stadium; Durham, NC | W 20–13 | 20,500 | |
| October 4 | at Vanderbilt* | Vanderbilt Stadium; Nashville, TN | L 18–24 | 38,874 | |
| October 18 | at No. 17 Clemson | Memorial Stadium; Clemson, SC | L 3–35 | 81,500 | |
| October 25 | Maryland^{†} | Wallace Wade Stadium; Durham, NC | L 19–27 | 18,600 | |
| November 1 | at Georgia Tech | Grant Field; Atlanta, GA | L 6–34 | 37,102 | |
| November 8 | Wake Forest | Wallace Wade Stadium; Durham, NC (rivalry) | W 38–36 | 36,200 | |
| November 15 | at NC State | Carter–Finley Stadium; Raleigh, NC (rivalry) | L 15–29 | 41,800 | |
| November 22 | North Carolina | Wallace Wade Stadium; Durham, NC (Victory Bell) | L 35–42 | 33,500 | |
*Non-conference game; ^{†}Homecoming; Rankings from AP Poll released prior to the game

== Roster ==
1986 Duke Blue Devils football team roster
Players
Coaches
Offense

| Pos. | # | Name | Class |
|---|---|---|---|
| TE | 22 | Jason Cooper | Jr |
| QB | 18 | Anthony Dilweg | So |
| WR | 5 | Doug Green | Jr |
| OL | 73 | Chris Port | Fr |

Defense

| Pos. | # | Name | Class |
|---|---|---|---|
| LB | 48 | Mike Junkin | Sr |

Special teams

| Pos. | # | Name | Class |

Head coach

- Steve Sloan

Coordinators/assistant coaches

- Rod Broadway (DL)

Legend

- (C) Team captain
- (S) Suspended
- (I) Ineligible
- Injured
- Redshirt

== Team players in the NFL ==
| Player | Position | Round | Pick | NFL club |
|---|---|---|---|---|
| Mike Junkin | Linebacker | 1 | 5 | Cleveland Browns |
