= 1986 Georgia Tech Yellow Jackets football team =

American college football season

1986 Georgia Tech Yellow Jackets football
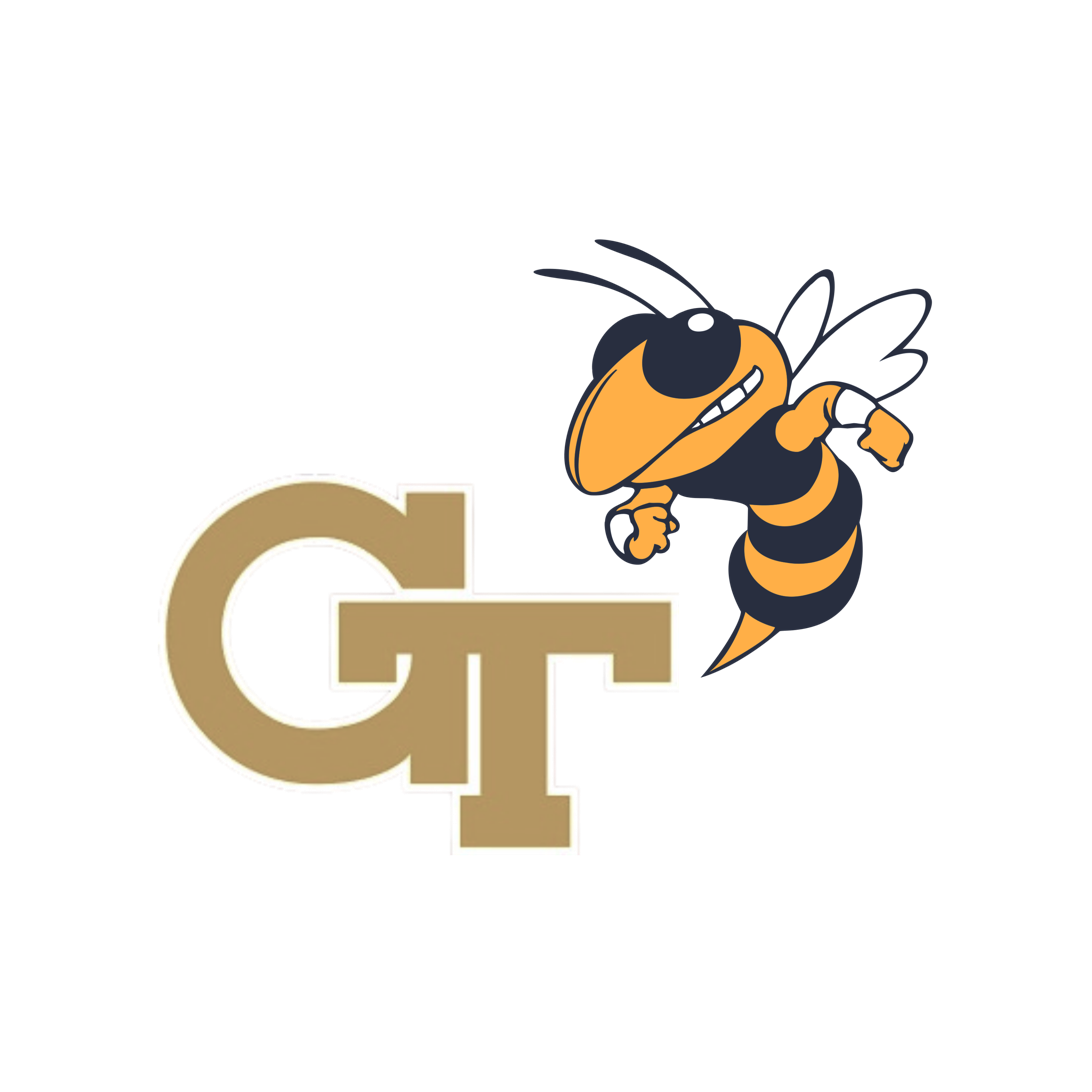
- Conference: Atlantic Coast Conference
- Record: 5–5–1 (3–3 ACC)
- Head coach: Bill Curry (7th season)
- Defensive coordinator: Don Lindsey (3rd season)
- Captains: Cory Collier; Kyle Ambrose; Bart Jones
- Home stadium: Grant Field

1986 Atlantic Coast Conference football standings
	Conf.					Overall
Team	W		L		T	W		L		T
No. 17 Clemson $	5	–	1	–	1	8	–	2	–	2
NC State	5	–	2	–	0	8	–	3	–	1
North Carolina	5	–	2	–	0	7	–	4	–	1
Georgia Tech	3	–	3	–	0	5	–	5	–	1
Maryland	2	–	3	–	1	5	–	5	–	1
Wake Forest	2	–	5	–	0	5	–	6	–	0
Duke	2	–	5	–	0	4	–	7	–	0
Virginia	2	–	5	–	0	3	–	8	–	0
$ – Conference champion; Rankings from AP Poll

The 1986 Georgia Tech Yellow Jackets football team represented the Georgia Institute of Technology during the 1986 NCAA Division I-A football season. The Yellow Jackets were led by head coach Bill Curry, in his seventh and final year with the team, and played their home games at Grant Field in Atlanta. The team competed as members of the Atlantic Coast Conference, finishing in fourth.

== Schedule ==
Date	Opponent	Site	TV	Result	Attendance	Source
September 13	Furman*	Grant Field; Atlanta, GA		T 17–17	33,352	
September 20	at Virginia	Scott Stadium; Charlottesville, VA		W 28–14	34,800	
September 27	Clemson	Grant Field; Atlanta, GA (rivalry)	Raycom	L 3–27	46,062	
October 4	at North Carolina	Kenan Memorial Stadium; Chapel Hill, NC		L 20–21	50,000	
October 11	No. 17 NC State	Grant Field; Atlanta, GA	Raycom	W 59–21	24,110	
October 18	at No. 7 Auburn*	Jordan-Hare Stadium; Auburn, AL (rivalry)		L 10–31	72,500	
October 25	Tennessee*	Grant Field; Atlanta, GA (rivalry)	TBS	W 14–13	28,432	
November 1	Duke^{†}	Grant Field; Atlanta, GA		W 34–6	37,102	
November 8	VMI*	Grant Field; Atlanta, GA		W 52–6	23,542	
November 22	at Wake Forest	Groves Stadium; Winston-Salem, NC	Raycom	L 21–24	17,300	
November 29	at No. 18 Georgia*	Sanford Stadium; Athens, GA (Clean, Old-Fashioned Hate)	TBS	L 24–31	82,122	
*Non-conference game; ^{†}Homecoming; Rankings from AP Poll released prior to the game

== Roster ==
1986 Georgia Tech Yellow Jackets football team roster
Players
Coaches
Offense

Pos.	#	Name	Class
TE		Tyrone Sorrells
QB		John Dewberry

Defense

Pos.	#	Name	Class

Special teams

Pos.	#	Name	Class

Head coach

- Bill Curry

Coordinators/assistant coaches

- Dwain Painter – Offensive coordinator
- Chip Wisdom – Running backs
- Mark Hendrickson – Wide receivers
- Jack Fligg – Offensive tackle/tight ends
- Don Lindsey – Defensive coordinator
- Larry New – Defensive line
- John Guy – Defensive ends
- Keith Colson – Outside linebacker
- A. J. Christoff – Defensive backs
- Mac McWhorter – Assistant head coach
- Rip Scherer – Assistant head coach
- David Dean – Graduate assistant

Legend

- (C) Team captain
- (S) Suspended
- (I) Ineligible
- Injured
- Redshirt
