= 1986 Western Carolina Catamounts football team =

American college football season

1986 Western Carolina Catamounts football
- Conference: Southern Conference
- Record: 6–5 (5–2 SoCon)
- Head coach: Bob Waters (18th season)
- Home stadium: E. J. Whitmire Stadium

1986 Southern Conference football standings
	Conf.					Overall
Team	W		L		T	W		L		T
No. 6 Appalachian State $^	6	–	0	–	1	9	–	2	–	1
Western Carolina	5	–	2	–	0	6	–	5	–	0
No. 15 Furman ^	4	–	2	–	1	7	–	3	–	2
East Tennessee State	4	–	3	–	0	6	–	5	–	0
Marshall	3	–	3	–	0	6	–	4	–	1
Chattanooga	2	–	4	–	0	4	–	7	–	0
VMI	1	–	5	–	0	1	–	10	–	0
The Citadel	0	–	6	–	0	3	–	8	–	0
Davidson	0	–	4	–	0	0	–	9	–	0
$ – Conference champion; ^ – NCAA Division I-AA playoff participant; Rankings from NCAA Division I-AA Football Committee poll

The 1986 Western Carolina Catamounts team was an American football team that represented Western Carolina University as a member of the Southern Conference (SoCon) during the 1986 NCAA Division I-AA football season. In their 18th year under head coach Bob Waters, the team compiled an overall record of 6–5, with a mark of 5–2 in conference play, and finished second in the SoCon.

== Schedule ==
Date	Opponent	Site	Result	Attendance	Source
August 30	at Appalachian State	Conrad Stadium; Boone, NC (rivalry)	L 13–17	22,618	
September 13	at South Carolina*	Williams–Brice Stadium; Columbia, SC	L 24–45	65,731	
September 27	Newberry*	E. J. Whitmire Stadium; Cullowhee, NC	W 34–24		
October 4	at No. 7 (I-A) Auburn*	Jordan-Hare Stadium; Auburn, AL	L 6–55	63,000	
October 11	East Tennessee State	E. J. Whitmire Stadium; Cullowhee, NC	W 43–16		
October 18	at No. 11 Furman	Paladin Stadium; Greenville, SC	W 19–13	15,245	
October 25	VMI	E. J. Whitmire Stadium; Cullowhee, NC	W 34–0	3,500	
November 1	The Citadel	E. J. Whitmire Stadium; Cullowhee, NC	W 27–12	5,618	
November 8	at Chattanooga	Chamberlain Field; Chattanooga, TN	L 7–34	6,063	
November 15	Marshall	E. J. Whitmire Stadium; Cullowhee, NC	W 33–20	5,882	
November 22	at NC State*	Carter–Finley Stadium; Raleigh, NC	L 18–31	39,200	
*Non-conference game; Rankings from NCAA Division I-AA Football Committee Poll released prior to the game
