= 1986 East Tennessee State Buccaneers football team =

American college football season

1986 East Tennessee State Buccaneers football
- Conference: Southern Conference
- Record: 6–5 (4–3 SoCon)
- Head coach: Mike Ayers (2nd season)
- Home stadium: Memorial Center

1986 Southern Conference football standings
	Conf.					Overall
Team	W		L		T	W		L		T
No. 6 Appalachian State $^	6	–	0	–	1	9	–	2	–	1
Western Carolina	5	–	2	–	0	6	–	5	–	0
No. 15 Furman ^	4	–	2	–	1	7	–	3	–	2
East Tennessee State	4	–	3	–	0	6	–	5	–	0
Marshall	3	–	3	–	0	6	–	4	–	1
Chattanooga	2	–	4	–	0	4	–	7	–	0
VMI	1	–	5	–	0	1	–	10	–	0
The Citadel	0	–	6	–	0	3	–	8	–	0
Davidson	0	–	4	–	0	0	–	9	–	0
$ – Conference champion; ^ – NCAA Division I-AA playoff participant; Rankings from NCAA Division I-AA Football Committee poll

The 1986 East Tennessee State Buccaneers football team was an American football team that represented East Tennessee State University as a member of the Southern Conference (SoCon) during the 1986 NCAA Division I-AA football season. Led by second-year head coach Mike Ayers, the Buccaneers compiled and overall record of 6–5, with a mark of 4–3 in conference play, and finished fourth in the SoCon.

== Schedule ==
Date	Opponent	Site	Result	Attendance	Source
September 13	at Appalachian State	Conrad Stadium; Boone, NC	L 14–40	14,200	
September 20	Davidson*	Memorial Center; Johnson City, TN	W 41–6		
September 27	at Virginia Tech*	Lane Stadium; Blacksburg, VA	L 10–37	34,400	
October 4	No. 3 Furman	Memorial Center; Johnson City, TN	W 25–13	7,550	
October 11	at Western Carolina	E. J. Whitmire Stadium; Cullowhee, NC	L 16–43		
October 18	Marshall	Memorial Center; Johnson City, TN	L 19–34		
October 25	at Chattanooga	Chamberlain Field; Chattanooga, TN	W 18–17	3,127	
November 1	Wofford*	Memorial Center; Johnson City, TN	W 52–3		
November 8	at James Madison*	JMU Stadium; Harrisonburg, VA	L 3–34	7,800	
November 15	at The Citadel	Johnson Hagood Stadium; Charleston, SC	W 35–9	13,854	
November 22	VMI	Memorial Center; Johnson City, TN	W 31–20	5,425	
*Non-conference game; Rankings from NCAA Division I-AA Football Committee Poll released prior to the game
