= Alvin Blount =

American gridiron football player (born 1965)

No. 28
- Position: Running back

Personal information
- Born: February 12, 1965 (age 61); Washington, D.C. U.S.
- Listed height: 5 ft 9 in (1.75 m)
- Listed weight: 197 lb (89 kg)

Career information
- High school: Eleanor Roosevelt (MD)
- College: Maryland
- NFL draft: 1987: 9th round, 235th overall pick

Career history
- Dallas Cowboys (1987); San Francisco 49ers (1988)*; Edmonton Eskimos (1989)*; Washington Commandos (1990); Albany Firebirds (1991)
- * Offseason or practice squad member only

Career NFL statistics
- Rushing yards: 125
- Rushing average: 2.7
- Touchdowns: 3
- Stats at Pro Football Reference

Career AFL statistics
- Games played: 14
- Receiving yards: 176
- Rushing yards: 52
- Tackles: 45
- Touchdowns: 1
- Stats at ArenaFan.com

Alvin Wilbert Blount (born February 12, 1965) is an American former professional football player who was a running back in the National Football League (NFL) for the Dallas Cowboys. He also was a member of the Washington Commandos and Albany Firebirds of the Arena Football League (AFL). He played college football for the Maryland Terrapins.

== Early life ==
Blount attended Eleanor Roosevelt High School, where he practiced football, baseball and track. He was a two-way player at running back and defensive back.

== College career ==
He accepted a football scholarship from the University of Maryland, College Park. As a freshman, he was a backup running back, only having 8 carries for 66 yards (8.3-yard avg.).

As a sophomore, he shared the running back position with Rick Badanjek, collecting 128 carries for 759 yards (5.9-yard avg.) and 5 touchdowns. Against both Wake Forest University and the University of North Carolina, he had matching 52-yard touchdown receptions. He was a part of one of the greatest comebacks in college football history, in the 42–40 win against the University of Miami. Against Clemson University, he had a career-high 214 rushing yards. Against the University of Virginia, he had a career long 72-yard touchdown run, finishing with 104 rushing yards.

As a junior, he was named the regular starter, although he still shared the running back position with Badanjek. He registered 171 carries for 828 yards (4.8-yard avg.) and 4 touchdowns. Against the University of Virginia, he had 26 carries for 186 yards.

As a senior co-captain, he had 119 carries for 505 yards (4.2-yard avg.) and 3 touchdowns. He didn't have any 100-yard games, but showed he was an all-round running back, displaying solid receiving and blocking skills.

He finished his college career with 426 carries for 2,158 yards (fifth in school history), a 5.1-yard rushing average, 12 rushing touchdowns, six 100-yard games, 64 receptions for 567 yards and 5 receiving touchdowns.

== Professional career ==
Pre-draft measurables
Height	Weight	Arm length	Hand span	40-yard dash	10-yard split	20-yard split	20-yard shuttle	Vertical jump	Broad jump	Bench press
5 ft 9 1/2 in (1.77 m)	201 lb (91 kg)	31 1/4 in (0.79 m)	8 3/4 in (0.22 m)	4.58 s	1.59 s	2.67 s	4.17 s	35.0 in (0.89 m)	9 ft 8 in (2.95 m)	13 reps
All values from NFL Combine

=== Dallas Cowboys ===
Blount was selected by the Dallas Cowboys in the 9th round (235th overall) of the 1987 NFL draft. As a rookie, he set the club record for a vertical leap (39 inches). He was waived on September 7.

After the NFLPA strike was declared on the third week of the 1987 season, those contests were canceled (reducing the 16-game season to 15) and the NFL decided that the games would be played with replacement players. He was re-signed to be a part of the Dallas replacement team that was given the mock name "Rhinestone Cowboys" by the media. He started against the New York Jets, leading the team with 28 carries for 72 yards and one touchdown. He started against the Philadelphia Eagles and although he shared the position with Tony Dorsett, he posted 18 carries for 53 yards and 2 touchdowns. He suffered a knee injury in the third game against the Washington Redskins. On October 27, he was placed on the injured reserve list. He wasn't re-signed after the season.

=== San Francisco 49ers ===
On February 9, 1988, he was signed as a free agent by the San Francisco 49ers. He was released before the start of the season.

=== Edmonton Eskimos ===
In 1989, he signed as a free agent with the Edmonton Eskimos of the Canadian Football League. He was released before the start of the season in July.

=== Washington Commandos ===
In 1990, he signed with the Washington Commandos of the Arena Football League (AFL) as a fullback-linebacker. He appeared in 5 games, tallying 15 receptions for 149 yards, 6 carries for 27 yards and 12 tackles.

=== Albany Firebirds ===
On June 5, 1991, he was signed by the Albany Firebirds of the AFL as a fullback-linebacker. He appeared in 9 games, making 13 carries for 25 yards, one touchdown, 5 receptions for 27 yards, 33 tackles, one interception and 1.5 sacks.

== Personal life ==
In 1989, he had a tryout with the U.S. national bobsledding team.
