= 1986 Wake Forest Demon Deacons football team =

American college football season

1986 Wake Forest Demon Deacons football
- Conference: Atlantic Coast Conference
- Record: 5–6 (2–5 ACC)
- Head coach: Al Groh (6th season)
- Defensive coordinator: Bob Pruett (2nd season)
- Captains: Rory Holt; Paul Kiser; Tim Morrison; Terence Ryan
- Home stadium: Groves Stadium

1986 Atlantic Coast Conference football standings
	Conf.					Overall
Team	W		L		T	W		L		T
No. 17 Clemson $	5	–	1	–	1	8	–	2	–	2
NC State	5	–	2	–	0	8	–	3	–	1
North Carolina	5	–	2	–	0	7	–	4	–	1
Georgia Tech	3	–	3	–	0	5	–	5	–	1
Maryland	2	–	3	–	1	5	–	5	–	1
Wake Forest	2	–	5	–	0	5	–	6	–	0
Duke	2	–	5	–	0	4	–	7	–	0
Virginia	2	–	5	–	0	3	–	8	–	0
$ – Conference champion; Rankings from AP Poll

The 1986 Wake Forest Demon Deacons football team was an American football team that represented Wake Forest University during the 1986 NCAA Division I-A football season. In their sixth and final season under head coach Al Groh, the Demon Deacons compiled a 5–6 record and finished in a three-way tie for last place in the Atlantic Coast Conference.

== Schedule ==
Date	Opponent	Site	Result	Attendance	Source
September 6	Appalachian State*	Groves Stadium; Winston-Salem, NC	W 21–13	28,700	
September 13	Boston University*	Groves Stadium; Winston-Salem, NC	W 31–0	17,800	
September 20	at NC State	Carter–Finley Stadium; Raleigh, NC (rivalry)	L 38–42	37,400	
September 27	at Army*	Michie Stadium; West Point, NY	W 49–14	40,053	
October 4	Virginia	Groves Stadium; Winston-Salem, NC	L 28–30	25,400	
October 11	North Carolina	Groves Stadium; Winston-Salem, NC (rivalry)	L 30–40	31,350	
October 18	at Maryland	Byrd Stadium; College Park, MD	W 27–21	39,650	
November 1	Clemson	Groves Stadium; Winston-Salem, NC	L 20–28	20,370	
November 8	at Duke	Wallace Wade Stadium; Durham, NC (rivalry)	L 36–38	36,200	
November 15	at South Carolina*	Williams–Brice Stadium; Columbia, SC	L 21–48	64,186	
November 22	Georgia Tech	Groves Stadium; Winston-Salem, NC	W 24–21	17,300	
*Non-conference game

== Team leaders ==
Category	Team Leader	Att/Cth	Yds
Passing	Mike Elkins	205/380	2,541
Rushing	Darryl McGill	184	859
Receiving	James Brim	66	930
