= 1986 Virginia Cavaliers football team =

American college football season

1986 Virginia Cavaliers football
- Conference: Atlantic Coast Conference
- Record: 3–8 (2–5 ACC)
- Head coach: George Welsh (5th season)
- Captains: Kevin Gould; Antonio Rice; Sean Scott
- Home stadium: Scott Stadium

1986 Atlantic Coast Conference football standings
	Conf.					Overall
Team	W		L		T	W		L		T
No. 17 Clemson $	5	–	1	–	1	8	–	2	–	2
NC State	5	–	2	–	0	8	–	3	–	1
North Carolina	5	–	2	–	0	7	–	4	–	1
Georgia Tech	3	–	3	–	0	5	–	5	–	1
Maryland	2	–	3	–	1	5	–	5	–	1
Wake Forest	2	–	5	–	0	5	–	6	–	0
Duke	2	–	5	–	0	4	–	7	–	0
Virginia	2	–	5	–	0	3	–	8	–	0
$ – Conference champion; Rankings from AP Poll

The 1986 Virginia Cavaliers football team represented the University of Virginia during the 1986 NCAA Division I-A football season. The Cavaliers were led by fifth-year head coach George Welsh and played their home games at Scott Stadium in Charlottesville, Virginia. They competed as members of the Atlantic Coast Conference, finishing tied for sixth.

== Schedule ==
Date	Time	Opponent	Site	TV	Result	Attendance	Source
September 6	12:20 p.m.	South Carolina*	Scott Stadium; Charlottesville, VA	JPS	W 30–20	34,700	
September 13	2:00 p.m.	at Navy*	Navy–Marine Corps Memorial Stadium; Annapolis, MD		L 10–20	30,057	
September 20	7:00 p.m.	Georgia Tech	Scott Stadium; Charlottesville, VA		L 14–28	34,800	
September 27	7:00 p.m.	at Duke	Wallace Wade Stadium; Durham, NC		L 13–20	20,500	
October 4	12:20 p.m.	at Wake Forest	Groves Stadium; Winston-Salem, NC	JPS	W 30–28	25,300	
October 11	7:00 p.m.	No. 20 Clemson	Scott Stadium; Charlottesville, VA		L 17–31	44,300	
October 25	1:00 p.m.	at Virginia Tech*	Lane Stadium; Blacksburg, VA (rivalry)		L 10–42	51,400	
November 1	12:15 p.m.	William & Mary*^{†}	Scott Stadium; Charlottesville, VA		L 37–41	35,100	
November 8	12:15 p.m.	No. 15 NC State	Scott Stadium; Charlottesville, VA	JPS	W 20–16	30,500	
November 15	12:15 p.m.	at North Carolina	Kenan Memorial Stadium; Chapel Hill, NC (South's Oldest Rivalry)	JPS	L 7–27	28,000	
November 28	2:30 p.m.	Maryland	Scott Stadium; Charlottesville, VA (rivalry)	CBS	L 10–42	27,800	
*Non-conference game; ^{†}Homecoming; Rankings from AP Poll released prior to the game

== Personnel ==
1986 Virginia Cavaliers football team roster
Players
Coaches
Offense

Pos.	#	Name	Class
TE	82	Joel Dempsey
TE		Kevin Ferguson
OL		John Fetsko
TE		Mike Fetsko
WR		Tim Finkelston
WR	17	John Ford	So
TE		Darryl Hammond
RB		Durwin Greggs
QB	1	Don Majkowski	Sr
WR		Keith Mattioli
RB		Kevin Morgan
OL		Tim Morris
RB		Antonio Rice
QB	10	Scott Secules	Jr
OL		Paul Sierocinsk
RB		Pat Toland
RB		Curtis Turner
OL	60	Scott Urch	Sr
RB	22	Chris Warren	Fr

Defense

Pos.	#	Name	Class
DL		Roy Brown
DB		Eric Clay
DB		Kevin Cook
DB		Dennis Fields
DB		Kevin Gould
DL		David Griggs
DL		Preston Hicks
DB		Ryan Jackson
DL		Billy Keys
LB		Jeff Lageman	So
DL		Craig Murden
DL		Tim O'Connor
DL	97	Rayotis Perkins	Sr
DB		Mike Pettine
DL		Judd Rupp
LB		Jim Sanford
LB		Ray Savage
DL		Sean Scott
LB		Phil Thomas
LB		Delano Tyler

Special teams

Pos.	#	Name	Class
P		Joel Dempsey
K		Jeff Gaffney
K		Maurizio Manca

Head coach

- George Welsh

Coordinators/assistant coaches

Legend

- (C) Team captain
- (S) Suspended
- (I) Ineligible
- Injured
- Redshirt
