= Dennis Thomas (disambiguation) =

Dennis Thomas may refer to:

- Dennis Thomas (footballer) (born 1926), English footballer for Bury and Accrington Stanley, see List of Bury F.C. players (1–24 appearances)
- Dennis "Dee Tee" Thomas (1951-2021), American musician
- Dennis Thomas (American football) (born 1953), American football player
