= 1986 Boston University Terriers football team =

American college football season

1986 Boston University Terriers football
- Conference: Yankee Conference
- Record: 4–7 (3–4 Yankee)
- Head coach: Steve Stetson (2nd season)
- Defensive coordinator: John Lyons (2nd season)
- Home stadium: Nickerson Field

1986 Yankee Conference football standings
	Conf.					Overall
Team	W		L		T	W		L		T
No. 13 Delaware +^	5	–	2	–	0	9	–	4	–	0
No. 19 Connecticut +	5	–	2	–	0	8	–	3	–	0
UMass +	5	–	2	–	0	8	–	3	–	0
New Hampshire	4	–	3	–	0	7	–	4	–	0
Maine	3	–	4	–	0	7	–	4	–	0
Richmond	3	–	4	–	0	4	–	7	–	0
Boston University	3	–	4	–	0	4	–	7	–	0
Rhode Island	0	–	7	–	0	1	–	10	–	0
+ – Conference co-champions; ^ – NCAA Division I-AA playoff participant; Rankings from NCAA Division I-AA Football Committee poll

The 1986 Boston University Terriers football team was an American football team that represented Boston University as a member of the Yankee Conference during the 1986 NCAA Division I-AA football season. In their second season under head coach Steve Stetson, the Terriers compiled a 4–7 record (3–4 against conference opponents), finished in a three-way tie for fifth place in the Yankee Conference, and were outscored by a total of 304 to 205.

== Schedule ==
Date	Opponent	Site	Result	Attendance	Source
September 6	Delaware State*	Nickerson Field; Boston, MA	L 9–30		
September 13	at Wake Forest*	Groves Stadium; Winston-Salem, NC	L 0–31	17,800	
September 20	at New Hampshire	Cowell Stadium; Durham, NH	L 9–26		
September 27	No. T–13 Maine	Nickerson Field; Boston, MA	W 26–23	9,874	
October 4	at Richmond	UR Stadium; Richmond, VA	L 15–56	10,648	
October 18	at Rhode Island	Meade Stadium; Kingston, RI	W 17–0	9,882	
October 25	UMass	Nickerson Field; Boston, MA	L 25–34	12,249	
November 1	at Connecticut	Memorial Stadium; Storrs, CT	L 7–24	11,073	
November 8	at Western Kentucky*	L. T. Smith Stadium; Bowling Green, KY	L 7–28	1,500	
November 15	Colgate*	Nickerson Field; Boston, MA	W 45–35	2,122	
November 22	No. 11 Delaware	Nickerson Field; Boston, MA	W 45–35	2,441	
*Non-conference game; Rankings from NCAA Division I-AA Football Committee Poll released prior to the game
