= 1986 Lafayette Leopards football team =

American college football season

1986 Lafayette Leopards football
- Conference: Colonial League
- Record: 6–5 (2–2 Colonial)
- Head coach: Bill Russo (6th season)
- Captains: Charles Brantley; Ryan Priest; Chris Thatcher
- Home stadium: Fisher Field

1986 Colonial League football standings
	Conf.					Overall
Team	W		L		T	W		L		T
No. 5 Holy Cross $	4	–	0	–	0	10	–	1	–	0
Lafayette	2	–	2	–	0	6	–	5	–	0
Lehigh	2	–	2	–	0	5	–	6	–	0
Colgate	1	–	3	–	0	4	–	7	–	0
Bucknell	1	–	3	–	0	3	–	7	–	0
$ – Conference champion; Rankings from NCAA Division I-AA Football Committee poll

The 1986 Lafayette Leopards football team was an American football team that represented Lafayette College during the 1986 NCAA Division I-AA football season. In the first year of play for the Colonial League, Lafayette tied for second place.

In their sixth year under head coach Bill Russo, the Leopards compiled a 6–5 record. Charles Brantley, Ryan Priest and Chris Thatcher were the team captains.

Lafayette's 2–2 conference record tied for second in the five-team Colonial League standings. Against all opponents, the Leopards were outscored 318 to 306.

Lafayette played its home games at Fisher Field on College Hill in Easton, Pennsylvania.

== Schedule ==
Date	Opponent	Site	Result	Attendance	Source
September 13	Kutztown*	Fisher Field; Easton, PA	W 17–6	6,100	
September 20	at Holy Cross	Fisher Field; Easton, PA	L 14–38	12,700	
September 27	at Columbia*	Wien Stadium; New York, NY	W 26–21	2,930	
October 4	Cornell*	Fisher Field; Easton, PA	W 33–22	4,500	
October 11	No. 14 New Hampshire*	Fisher Field; Easton, PA	L 16–20	12,500	
October 18	at Davidson*	Richardson Stadium; Davidson, NC	W 51–14	2,700	
October 25	at Bucknell	Memorial Stadium; Lewisburg, PA	W 52–34	7,430	
November 1	at Colgate	Andy Kerr Stadium; Hamilton, NY	L 7–42	5,700	
November 8	at No. 6 Penn*	Franklin Field; Philadelphia, PA	L 14–42	9,210	
November 15	at Army*	Michie Stadium; West Point, NY	L 48–56	40,088	
November 22	Lehigh	Fisher Field; Easton, PA (The Rivalry)	W 28–23	17,500	
*Non-conference game; Rankings from NCAA Division I-AA Football Committee Poll released prior to the game

== Roster ==
1986 Lafayette Leopards football team roster
Players
Coaches
Offense

Pos.	#	Name	Class
QB	13	Mike Barnes	Jr
QB	14	Frank Baur	So
WR	7	Philip Ng	Jr
RB	46	Ryan Priest	Sr
QB	5	Paul Struncius	Jr
G	78	Chris Thatcher	Sr

Defense

Pos.	#	Name	Class
DE	53	Charles Brantley	Sr
LB	94	Joe Cummiskey	Sr
SS	11	Mike Joseph	Jr
DL	95	Chris LaPietra	So
FS	22	Dave MacPhee	Jr
CB	24	Joe Yanek	Sr

Special teams

Pos.	#	Name	Class

Head coach

- Bill Russo

Coordinators/assistant coaches

Legend

- (C) Team captain
- (S) Suspended
- (I) Ineligible
- Injured
- Redshirt
