= 1986 Bucknell Bison football team =

American college football season

1986 Bucknell Bison football
- Conference: Colonial League
- Record: 3–7 (1–3 Colonial)
- Head coach: George Landis (1st season)
- Captains: Earl Beecham; Doug Fastuca
- Home stadium: Memorial Stadium

1986 Colonial League football standings
| | Conf. | | | | | Overall |
| Team | W | | L | | T | W | | L | | T |
|---|---|---|---|---|---|---|---|---|---|---|
| No. 5 Holy Cross $ | 4 | – | 0 | – | 0 | 10 | – | 1 | – | 0 |
| Lafayette | 2 | – | 2 | – | 0 | 6 | – | 5 | – | 0 |
| Lehigh | 2 | – | 2 | – | 0 | 5 | – | 6 | – | 0 |
| Colgate | 1 | – | 3 | – | 0 | 4 | – | 7 | – | 0 |
| Bucknell | 1 | – | 3 | – | 0 | 3 | – | 7 | – | 0 |
$ – Conference champion; Rankings from NCAA Division I-AA Football Committee poll

The 1986 Bucknell Bison football team was an American football team that represented Bucknell University during the 1986 NCAA Division I-AA football season. In the first year of play for the Colonial League, Bucknell tied for last place.

Bucknell played its home games at Memorial Stadium on the university campus in Lewisburg, Pennsylvania.

In its first year under head coach George Landis, the Bison compiled a 3–7 record. Earl Beecham and Doug Fastuca were the team captains.

Bucknell's 1–3 conference record tied for fourth in the five-team Colonial League standings. Against all opponents, the Bison were outscored 223 to 171.

== Schedule ==
| Date | Opponent | Site | Result | Attendance | Source |
|---|---|---|---|---|---|
| September 13 | IUP* | Memorial Stadium; Lewisburg, PA | W 23–7 | | |
| September 20 | No. 9 William & Mary* | Memorial Stadium; Lewisburg, PA | L 13–30 | 4,760 | |
| September 27 | at Penn* | Franklin Field; Philadelphia, PA | L 7–10 | 15,241 | |
| October 4 | Towson State* | Memorial Stadium; Lewisburg, PA | L 7–28 | 4,340 | |
| October 11 | at Davidson* | Richardson Stadium; Davidson, NC | W 27–7 | 1,000 | |
| October 18 | Colgate^ | Memorial Stadium; Lewisburg, PA | W 40–39 | 8,860 | |
| October 25 | Lafayette^{†} | Memorial Stadium; Lewisburg, PA | L 34–52 | 7,430 | |
| November 1 | at Cornell* | Schoellkopf Field; Ithaca, NY | L 3–16 | 7,000 | |
| November 8 | at No. 2 Holy Cross | Fitton Field; Worcester, MA | L 10–17 | 9,041 | |
| November 15 | at Lehigh | Taylor Stadium; Bethlehem, PA | L 7–17 | 8,500 | |
*Non-conference game; ^{†}Homecoming; ^ Parents Weekend; Rankings from NCAA Division I-AA Football Committee Poll released prior to the game
