= 1986 Dartmouth Big Green football team =

American college football season

1986 Dartmouth Big Green football
- Conference: Ivy League
- Record: 3–6–1 (3–3–1 Ivy)
- Head coach: Joe Yukica (9th season)
- Captains: David Gabianelli; Russell Gardner
- Home stadium: Memorial Field

1986 Ivy League football standings
	Conf.					Overall
Team	W		L		T	W		L		T
No. 7 Penn $	7	–	0	–	0	10	–	0	–	0
Cornell	6	–	1	–	0	8	–	2	–	0
Brown	4	–	2	–	1	5	–	4	–	1
Dartmouth	3	–	3	–	1	3	–	6	–	1
Harvard	3	–	4	–	0	3	–	7	–	0
Yale	2	–	5	–	0	3	–	7	–	0
Princeton	2	–	5	–	0	2	–	8	–	0
Columbia	0	–	7	–	0	0	–	10	–	0
$ – Conference champion; Rankings from NCAA Division I-AA Football Committee poll

The 1986 Dartmouth Big Green football team was an American football team that represented Dartmouth College during the 1986 NCAA Division I-AA football season. The Big Green finished fourth in the Ivy League.

In its ninth and final season under head coach Joe Yukica, the team compiled a 3–6–1 record and was outscored 272 to 188. David Gabianelli and Russell Gardner were the team captains.

The Big Green's 3–3–1 conference record placed fourth in the Ivy League standings. Dartmouth outscored Ivy opponents 169 to 113.

Dartmouth played its home games at Memorial Field on the college campus in Hanover, New Hampshire.

== Schedule ==
Date	Opponent	Site	Result	Attendance	Source
September 20	Penn	Memorial Field; Hanover, NH	L 7–21	7,260	
September 27	New Hampshire*	Memorial Field; Hanover, NH (rivalry)	L 12–66	9,927	
October 4	at Navy*	Navy–Marine Corps Memorial Stadium; Annapolis, MD	L 0–45	31,543	
October 11	at No. 9 Holy Cross*	Fitton Field; Worcester, MA	L 7–48	14,171	
October 18	Harvard	Memorial Field; Hanover, NH (rivalry)	L 26–42	15,618	
October 25	Cornell	Memorial Field; Hanover, NH (rivalry)	L 7–10	8,137	
November 1	at Yale	Yale Bowl; New Haven, CT	W 39–13	17,170	
November 8	Columbia	Memorial Field; Hanover, NH	W 41–0	2,210	
November 15	at Brown	Brown Stadium; Providence, RI	T 21–21	6,350	
November 22	at Princeton	Palmer Stadium; Princeton, NJ	W 28–6	8,200	
*Non-conference game; Rankings from the latest NCAA Division I-AA poll released prior to the game
