= 1986 Howard Bison football team =

American college football season

1986 Howard Bison football
- Conference: Mid-Eastern Athletic Conference
- Record: 8–3 (3–2 MEAC)
- Head coach: Willie Jeffries (3rd season)
- Home stadium: William H. Greene Stadium

1986 Mid-Eastern Athletic Conference football standings
	Conf.					Overall
Team	W		L		T	W		L		T
No. 20 North Carolina A&T $^	4	–	1	–	0	9	–	3	–	0
Howard	3	–	2	–	0	8	–	3	–	0
Delaware State	3	–	2	–	0	7	–	4	–	0
South Carolina State	3	–	2	–	0	5	–	6	–	0
Bethune–Cookman	2	–	3	–	0	3	–	8	–	0
Morgan State	0	–	5	–	0	1	–	9	–	0
$ – Conference champion; ^ – NCAA Division I-AA playoff participant; Rankings from NCAA Division I-AA Football Committee poll

The 1986 Howard Bison football team represented Howard University as a member of the Mid-Eastern Athletic Conference (MEAC) during the 1986 NCAA Division I-AA football season. Led by third-year head coach Willie Jeffries, the Bison compiled an overall record of 8–3, with a mark of 3–2 in conference play, and finished tied for second in the MEAC.

== Schedule ==
Date	Opponent	Site	Result	Attendance	Source
September 6	Maine*	William H. Greene Stadium; Washington, DC	L 22–38	8,000	
September 13	at Hampton*	Armstrong Stadium; Hampton, VA (rivalry)	W 21–7		
September 20	Bethune–Cookman	William H. Greene Stadium; Washington, DC	L 6–30	1,000	
September 27	at South Carolina State	Oliver C. Dawson Stadium; Orangeburg, SC	L 23–44	7,415	
October 11	Winston-Salem State*	William H. Greene Stadium; Washington, DC	W 36–7		
October 18	at Virginia State*	Rogers Stadium; Ettrick, VA	W 28–13	16,000	
October 25	No. 14 North Carolina A&T	William H. Greene Stadium; Washington, DC	W 42–10	12,563	
November 1	at Norfolk State*	Foreman Field; Norfolk, VA	W 38–13		
November 8	at Morehouse*	B. T. Harvey Stadium; Atlanta, GA	W 49–14	10,000	
November 15	Morgan State	William H. Greene Stadium; Washington, DC (rivalry)	W 60–6	8,114	
November 22	Delaware State	William H. Greene Stadium; Washington, DC	W 27–18		
*Non-conference game; Rankings from NCAA Division I-AA Football Committee Poll released prior to the game
