= 1986 Delaware Fightin' Blue Hens football team =

American college football season

1986 Delaware Fightin' Blue Hens football

Yankee Conference co-champion

NCAA Division I-AA Quarterfinal, L 14–55 vs. Arkansas State
- Conference: Yankee Conference
- Record: 9–4 (5–2 Yankee)
- Head coach: Tubby Raymond (21st season)
- Offensive coordinator: Ted Kempski (19th season)
- Offensive scheme: Delaware Wing-T
- Base defense: 5–2
- Home stadium: Delaware Stadium

1986 Yankee Conference football standings
	Conf.					Overall
Team	W		L		T	W		L		T
No. 13 Delaware +^	5	–	2	–	0	9	–	4	–	0
No. 19 Connecticut +	5	–	2	–	0	8	–	3	–	0
UMass +	5	–	2	–	0	8	–	3	–	0
New Hampshire	4	–	3	–	0	7	–	4	–	0
Maine	3	–	4	–	0	7	–	4	–	0
Richmond	3	–	4	–	0	4	–	7	–	0
Boston University	3	–	4	–	0	4	–	7	–	0
Rhode Island	0	–	7	–	0	1	–	10	–	0
+ – Conference co-champions; ^ – NCAA Division I-AA playoff participant; Rankings from NCAA Division I-AA Football Committee poll

The 1986 Delaware Fightin' Blue Hens football team represented the University of Delaware in the 1986 NCAA Division I-AA football season. It was the program's first year as a member of the Yankee Conference, after having been an independent for the previous 16 seasons. Delaware was led by Tubby Raymond, who was in his 21st season as head coach of the Fightin' Blue Hens. Quarterback Rich Gannon was a senior, and followed this season with an 18-year NFL career. The team played its home games at Delaware Stadium in Newark, Delaware.

== Schedule ==
Date	Opponent	Rank	Site	Result	Attendance	Source
September 6	Rhode Island	No. 6	Delaware Stadium; Newark, DE	W 44–10	17,337	
September 13	New Hampshire	No. 6	Delaware Stadium; Newark, DE	L 21–28 ^{OT}	17,294	
September 20	West Chester*	No. 13	Delaware Stadium; Newark, DE (rivalry)	W 33–31	22,221	
September 27	at Richmond	No. 19	University of Richmond Stadium; Richmond, VA	W 20–19	17,423	
October 11	at UMass	No. 15	Warren McGuirk Alumni Stadium; Hadley, MA	W 41–13	13,888	
October 18	No. 4 William & Mary*	No. T–14	Delaware Stadium; Newark, DE (rivalry)	L 18–24	23,045	
October 25	Lehigh*	No. 16	Delaware Stadium; Newark, DE (rivalry)	W 28–17	17,685	
November 1	at Maine	No. 15	Alumni Field; Orono, ME	W 34–31	3,500	
November 8	Connecticut	No. T–14	Delaware Stadium; Newark, DE	W 35–7	15,855	
November 15	at Navy*	No. 12	Navy–Marine Corps Memorial Stadium; Annapolis, MD	W 27–14	30,089	
November 22	at Boston University	No. 11	Nickerson Field; Boston, MA	L 35–45	2,441	
November 29	at No. 8 William & Mary*	No. 13	Cary Field; Williamsburg, VA (NCAA Division I-AA First Round)	W 51–17	5,700	
December 6	No. 2 Arkansas State*	No. 13	Delaware Stadium; Newark, Delaware (NCAA Division I-AA Quarterfinal)	L 14–55	12,018	
*Non-conference game; Rankings from NCAA Division I-AA Football Committee Poll released prior to the game
