= 1986 Columbia Lions football team =

American college football season

1986 Columbia Lions football
- Conference: Ivy League
- Record: 0–10 (0–7 Ivy)
- Head coach: Larry McElreavy (1st season)
- Defensive coordinator: Bill Narduzzi (1st season)
- Captain: Chris Riga
- Home stadium: Wien Stadium

1986 Ivy League football standings
	Conf.					Overall
Team	W		L		T	W		L		T
No. 7 Penn $	7	–	0	–	0	10	–	0	–	0
Cornell	6	–	1	–	0	8	–	2	–	0
Brown	4	–	2	–	1	5	–	4	–	1
Dartmouth	3	–	3	–	1	3	–	6	–	1
Harvard	3	–	4	–	0	3	–	7	–	0
Yale	2	–	5	–	0	3	–	7	–	0
Princeton	2	–	5	–	0	2	–	8	–	0
Columbia	0	–	7	–	0	0	–	10	–	0
$ – Conference champion; Rankings from NCAA Division I-AA Football Committee poll

The 1986 Columbia Lions football team was an American football team that represented Columbia University during the 1986 NCAA Division I-AA football season. Amid a record-setting loss streak, Columbia finished last in the Ivy League.

In their first season under head coach Larry McElreavy, the Lions compiled an 0–10 record and were outscored 379 to 91. Chris Riga was the team captain.

The Lions' winless (0–7) conference record was the worst in the Ivy League standings. Columbia was outscored 257 to 28 by Ivy opponents.

By losing all of their games in 1986, the Lions extended a winless streak and a losing streak that began in 1983. They would not win or tie another game until October 9, 1988, against Princeton, an NCAA Division I record streak at the time. At the end of 1986, the streak stood at 34 games without a win, and 31 straight losses.

Columbia played its homes games at Lawrence A. Wien Stadium in Upper Manhattan, in New York City.

== Schedule ==
Date	Opponent	Site	Result	Attendance	Source
September 20	at Harvard	Harvard Stadium; Boston, MA	L 0–34	7,534	
September 27	Lafayette*	Wien Stadium; New York, NY	L 21–26	2,930	
October 4	at Penn	Franklin Field; Philadelphia, PA	L 7–42	10,878	
October 11	Princeton^{†}	Wien Stadium; New York, NY	L 14–20	8,150	
October 18	at Yale	Yale Bowl; New Haven, CT	L 0–47	10,163	
October 25	Colgate*	Wien Stadium; New York, NY	L 8–54	4,640	
November 1	Villanova*	Wien Stadium; New York, NY	L 34–42	4,750	
November 8	at Dartmouth	Memorial Field; Hanover, NH	L 0–41	2,210	
November 15	No. 16 Cornell	Wien Stadium; New York, NY (rivalry)	L 0–28	4,720	
November 22	Brown	Wien Stadium; New York, NY	L 7–45	3,010	
*Non-conference game; ^{†}Homecoming; Rankings from the latest NCAA Division I-AA poll released prior to the game
