= 1986 Yale Bulldogs football team =

American college football season

1986 Yale Bulldogs football
- Conference: Ivy League
- Record: 3–7 (2–5 Ivy)
- Head coach: Carmen Cozza (22nd season)
- Home stadium: Yale Bowl

1986 Ivy League football standings
	Conf.					Overall
Team	W		L		T	W		L		T
No. 7 Penn $	7	–	0	–	0	10	–	0	–	0
Cornell	6	–	1	–	0	8	–	2	–	0
Brown	4	–	2	–	1	5	–	4	–	1
Dartmouth	3	–	3	–	1	3	–	6	–	1
Harvard	3	–	4	–	0	3	–	7	–	0
Yale	2	–	5	–	0	3	–	7	–	0
Princeton	2	–	5	–	0	2	–	8	–	0
Columbia	0	–	7	–	0	0	–	10	–	0
$ – Conference champion; Rankings from NCAA Division I-AA Football Committee poll

The 1986 Yale Bulldogs football team represented Yale University in the 1986 NCAA Division I-AA football season. The Bulldogs were led by 22nd-year head coach Carmen Cozza, played their home games at the Yale Bowl and finished in sixth place in the Ivy League with a 2–5 record, 3–7 overall.

== Schedule ==
Date	Opponent	Site	Result	Attendance	Source
September 20	at Brown	Brown Stadium; Providence, RI	L 7–21	11,300	
September 27	Connecticut*	Yale Bowl; New Haven, CT	L 12–17	25,175	
October 4	Army*	Yale Bowl; New Haven, CT	L 24–41	25,075	
October 11	Colgate*	Yale Bowl; New Haven, CT	W 28–23	22,148	
October 18	Columbia	Yale Bowl; New Haven, CT	W 47–0	10,163	
October 25	at Penn	Franklin Field; Philadelphia, PA	L 6–24	32,761	
November 1	Dartmouth	Yale Bowl; New Haven, CT	L 13–39	17,170	
November 8	at Cornell	Schoellkopf Field; Ithaca, NY	L 0–15	17,000	
November 15	Princeton	Yale Bowl; New Haven, CT (rivalry)	W 14–13	22,202	
November 22	at Harvard	Harvard Stadium; Boston, MA (The Game)	L 17–24	40,000	
*Non-conference game
