= 1986 Cornell Big Red football team =

American college football season

1986 Cornell Big Red football
- Conference: Ivy League
- Record: 8–2 (6–1 Ivy)
- Head coach: Maxie Baughan (4th season)
- Captains: Tom Bernardo; Erik Bernstein; Ken Johnson
- Home stadium: Schoellkopf Field

1986 Ivy League football standings
	Conf.					Overall
Team	W		L		T	W		L		T
No. 7 Penn $	7	–	0	–	0	10	–	0	–	0
Cornell	6	–	1	–	0	8	–	2	–	0
Brown	4	–	2	–	1	5	–	4	–	1
Dartmouth	3	–	3	–	1	3	–	6	–	1
Harvard	3	–	4	–	0	3	–	7	–	0
Yale	2	–	5	–	0	3	–	7	–	0
Princeton	2	–	5	–	0	2	–	8	–	0
Columbia	0	–	7	–	0	0	–	10	–	0
$ – Conference champion; Rankings from NCAA Division I-AA Football Committee poll

The 1986 Cornell Big Red football team was an American football team that represented Cornell University during the 1986 NCAA Division I-AA football season. Cornell finished second in the Ivy League.

In its fourth season under head coach Maxie Baughan, the team compiled an 8–2 record and outscored opponents 202 to 103. Team captains were Tom Bernardo, Erik Bernstein and Ken Johnson.

Cornell's 6–1 conference record placed second in the Ivy League standings. The Big Red outscored Ivy opponents 153 to 55. Cornell's only league loss was to the league champion, Penn, in a title-deciding game on the last week of the season.

Cornell played its home games at Schoellkopf Field in Ithaca, New York.

== Schedule ==
Date	Opponent	Site	Result	Attendance	Source
September 20	Princeton	Schoellkopf Field; Ithaca, NY	W 39–8	13,500	
September 27	at Colgate*	Andy Kerr Stadium; Hamilton, NY (rivalry)	W 21–12	8,000	
October 4	at Lafayette*	Fisher Field; Easton, PA	L 22–33	4,500	
October 11	at Harvard	Harvard Stadium; Boston, MA	W 3–0	17,531	
October 18	Brown	Schoellkopf Field; Ithaca, NY	W 27–9	12,300	
October 25	at Dartmouth	Memorial Field; Hanover, NH (rivalry)	W 10–7	8,137	
November 1	Bucknell*	Schoellkopf Field; Ithaca, NY	W 16–3	7,000	
November 8	Yale	Schoellkopf Field; Ithaca, NY	W 15–0	17,000	
November 15	at Columbia	Wien Stadium; New York, NY (rivalry)	W 28–0	4,720	
November 22	No. 6 Penn	Schoellkopf Field; Ithaca, NY (rivalry)	L 21–31	22,000	
*Non-conference game; Rankings from the latest NCAA Division I-AA poll released prior to the game
