= 1986 North Carolina A&T Aggies football team =

American college football season

1986 North Carolina A&T Aggies football

MEAC champion

NCAA Division I-AA First Round, L 21–52 vs. Georgia Southern
- Conference: Mid-Eastern Athletic Conference
- Record: 9–3 (4–1 MEAC)
- Head coach: Mo Forte (5th season)
- Home stadium: Aggie Stadium

1986 Mid-Eastern Athletic Conference football standings
	Conf.					Overall
Team	W		L		T	W		L		T
No. 20 North Carolina A&T $^	4	–	1	–	0	9	–	3	–	0
Howard	3	–	2	–	0	8	–	3	–	0
Delaware State	3	–	2	–	0	7	–	4	–	0
South Carolina State	3	–	2	–	0	5	–	6	–	0
Bethune–Cookman	2	–	3	–	0	3	–	8	–	0
Morgan State	0	–	5	–	0	1	–	9	–	0
$ – Conference champion; ^ – NCAA Division I-AA playoff participant; Rankings from NCAA Division I-AA Football Committee poll

The 1986 North Carolina A&T Aggies football team represented North Carolina A&T State University as a member of the Mid-Eastern Athletic Conference (MEAC) during the 1986 NCAA Division I-AA football season. Led by fifth-year head coach Mo Forte, the Aggies compiled an overall record of 9–3, with a mark of 4–1 in conference play, and finished as MEAC champion.

== Schedule ==
Date	Opponent	Rank	Site	Result	Attendance	Source
September 6	at Fayetteville State*		Bronco Stadium; Fayetteville, NC	W 50–0		
September 13	Winston-Salem State*		Aggie Stadium; Greensboro, NC	W 28–21		
September 20	South Carolina State		Aggie Stadium; Greensboro, NC (rivalry)	W 34–11	15,500	
September 27	at Morgan State		Hughes Stadium; Baltimore, MD	W 40–23	4,500	
October 4	at Johnson C. Smith*		American Legion Memorial Stadium; Charlotte, NC	W 35–3	18,000	
October 11	Mississippi Valley State*	No. 18	Aggie Stadium; Greensboro, NC	W 20–14	18,000	
October 25	at Howard	No. 14	William H. Greene Stadium; Washington, D.C.	L 10–42	12,563	
November 1	Bethune–Cookman		Aggie Stadium; Greensboro, NC	W 30–24 ^{OT}		
November 8	No. 14 Delaware State	No. 20	Aggie Stadium; Greensboro, NC	W 20–17		
November 15	at North Carolina Central*	No. 13	O'Kelly Stadium; Durham, NC (rivalry)	W 35–12		
November 22	at No. 7 Appalachian State*	No. 13	Conrad Stadium; Boone, NC	L 9–55	14,700	
November 29	at No. 4 Georgia Southern*	No. 20	Paulson Stadium; Statesboro, GA (NCAA Division I-AA First Round)	L 21–52	7,767	
*Non-conference game; Rankings from NCAA Division I-AA Football Committee Poll released prior to the game
