= Jesse Thomas (American football) =

American football player (1928–2012)

No. 99, 40, 20, 42
- Position: Defensive back

Personal information
- Born: May 23, 1928; Guthrie, Oklahoma, U.S.
- Died: May 16, 2012 (aged 83); Columbia, Maryland, U.S.
- Listed height: 5 ft 10 in (1.78 m)
- Listed weight: 180 lb (82 kg)

Career information
- High school: Flint Central (Flint, Michigan)
- College: Michigan State (1947–1950)
- NFL draft: 1951: 10th round, 119th overall pick

Career history

Playing
- Winnipeg Blue Bombers (1954); Baltimore Colts (1955–1957); Los Angeles Chargers (1960); Baltimore Broncos/Hazelton Mustangs (1963)

Coaching
- Morgan State (1985–1987) Head coach

Career NFL/AFL statistics
- Interceptions: 4
- Fumble recoveries: 1
- Touchdowns: 1
- Stats at Pro Football Reference

Head coaching record
- Career: 3–26 (.103)

Jesse LeRoy Thomas (May 23, 1928 – May 16, 2012) was an American football player and coach. He played college football for Michigan State University. He also competed in track for Michigan State. After leaving Michigan State, he served two years in the United States Army and then played one year for the Winnipeg Blue Bombers of the Canadian Football League (CFL). He later played in the National Football League (NFL) for the Baltimore Colts from 1955 to 1957 and in the American Football League for the Los Angeles Chargers in 1960.

Thomas was also an accomplished long jumper, placing 3rd at the 1951 USA Outdoor Track and Field Championships in that event. He was also an All-American in the javelin throw and 110 meters hurdles.

After his playing career, Thomas taught at Morgan State University for over 40 years and served as head coach of the football team from 1985 to 1987. At Morgan State, he was a physical education instructor, served as athletic director, and also coached swimming, track and field, wrestling, lacrosse, tennis, and badminton.

== Head coaching record ==
Year	Team	Overall	Conference	Standing	Bowl/playoffs
Morgan State Bears (Mid-Eastern Athletic Conference) (1985–1987)
1985	Morgan State	0–9	0–0	6th	
1986	Morgan State	1–9	0–5	6th	
1987	Morgan State	2–8	1–4	6th	
Morgan State:		3–26	1–9		
Total:		3–26			
