= 1986 South Carolina State Bulldogs football team =

American college football season

1986 South Carolina State Bulldogs football
- Conference: Mid-Eastern Athletic Conference
- Record: 5–6 (3–2 MEAC)
- Head coach: Dennis Thomas (1st season)
- Home stadium: Oliver C. Dawson Stadium

1986 Mid-Eastern Athletic Conference football standings
	Conf.					Overall
Team	W		L		T	W		L		T
No. 20 North Carolina A&T $^	4	–	1	–	0	9	–	3	–	0
Howard	3	–	2	–	0	8	–	3	–	0
Delaware State	3	–	2	–	0	7	–	4	–	0
South Carolina State	3	–	2	–	0	5	–	6	–	0
Bethune–Cookman	2	–	3	–	0	3	–	8	–	0
Morgan State	0	–	5	–	0	1	–	9	–	0
$ – Conference champion; ^ – NCAA Division I-AA playoff participant; Rankings from NCAA Division I-AA Football Committee poll

The 1986 South Carolina State Bulldogs football team represented South Carolina State College (now known as South Carolina State University) as a member of the Mid-Eastern Athletic Conference (MEAC) during the 1986 NCAA Division I-AA football season. Led by first-year head coach Dennis Thomas, the Bulldogs compiled an overall record of 5–6, with a mark of 3–2 in conference play, and finished tied for second in the MEAC.

== Schedule ==
Date	Opponent	Site	Result	Attendance	Source
September 6	at No. 9 Furman*	Paladin Stadium; Greenville, SC	L 7–34	15,085	
September 13	Elizabeth City State*	Oliver C. Dawson Stadium; Orangeburg, SC	W 31–6	7,124	
September 20	at North Carolina A&T	Aggie Stadium; Greensboro, NC (rivalry)	L 11–34	15,500	
September 27	Howard	Oliver C. Dawson Stadium; Orangeburg, SC	W 44–23	7,415	
October 4	Alcorn State*	Oliver C. Dawson Stadium; Orangeburg, SC	W 20–10	7,012	
October 11	Morgan State	Oliver C. Dawson Stadium; Orangeburg, SC	W 35–0	14,185	
October 25	at Bethune–Cookman	Memorial Stadium; Daytona Beach, FL	W 28–14	10,800	
November 1	at No. 16 Delaware State	Alumni Stadium; Dover, DE	L 21–34	6,000	
November 8	at Florida A&M*	Bragg Memorial Stadium; Tallahassee, FL	L 3–26	7,295	
November 15	Grambling State*	Oliver C. Dawson Stadium; Orangeburg, SC	L 16–20	7,413	
November 22	at No. 5 Georgia Southern*	Paulson Stadium; Statesboro, GA	L 7–28	12,585	
*Non-conference game; Rankings from NCAA Division I-AA Football Committee Poll released prior to the game
