= 1986 Princeton Tigers football team =

American college football season

1986 Princeton Tigers football
- Conference: Ivy League
- Record: 2–8 (2–5 Ivy)
- Head coach: Ron Rogerson (2nd season)
- Captains: Kevin L. Armstrong; Edwin J. Elton
- Home stadium: Palmer Stadium

1986 Ivy League football standings
	Conf.					Overall
Team	W		L		T	W		L		T
No. 7 Penn $	7	–	0	–	0	10	–	0	–	0
Cornell	6	–	1	–	0	8	–	2	–	0
Brown	4	–	2	–	1	5	–	4	–	1
Dartmouth	3	–	3	–	1	3	–	6	–	1
Harvard	3	–	4	–	0	3	–	7	–	0
Yale	2	–	5	–	0	3	–	7	–	0
Princeton	2	–	5	–	0	2	–	8	–	0
Columbia	0	–	7	–	0	0	–	10	–	0
$ – Conference champion; Rankings from NCAA Division I-AA Football Committee poll

The 1986 Princeton Tigers football team was an American football team that represented Princeton University during the 1986 NCAA Division I-AA football season. Princeton tied for second-to-last in the Ivy League.

In their second and final year under head coach Ron Rogerson, the Tigers compiled a 2–8 record and were outscored 262 to 123. Kevin L. Armstrong and Edwin J. Elton were the team captains.

Princeton's 2–5 conference record tied for sixth in the Ivy League standings. The Tigers were outscored 145 to 81 by Ivy opponents.

Princeton played its home games at Palmer Stadium on the university campus in Princeton, New Jersey.

== Schedule ==
Date	Opponent	Site	Result	Attendance	Source
September 20	at Cornell	Schoellkopf Field; Ithaca, NY	L 8–39	13,500	
September 27	Northwestern*	Palmer Stadium; Princeton, NJ	L 0–37	8,750	
October 4	Brown	Palmer Stadium; Princeton, NJ	L 10–24	9,375	
October 11	at Columbia	Wien Stadium; New York, NY	W 20–14	8,150	
October 18	at Lehigh*	Taylor Stadium; Bethlehem, PA	L 28–48	11,500	
October 25	Harvard	Palmer Stadium; Princeton, NJ (rivalry)	W 14–3	20,500	
November 1	No. 8 Penn	Palmer Stadium; Princeton, NJ (rivalry)	L 10–23	18,500	
November 8	at No. 8 William & Mary*	Cary Field; Williamsburg, VA	L 14–32	11,300	
November 15	at Yale	Yale Bowl; New Haven, CT (rivalry)	L 13–14	22,202	
November 22	Dartmouth	Palmer Stadium; Princeton, NJ	L 6–28	8,200	
*Non-conference game; Rankings from the latest NCAA Division I-AA poll released prior to the game
