= 1986 Delaware State Hornets football team =

American college football season

1986 Delaware State Hornets football
- Conference: Mid-Eastern Athletic Conference
- Record: 7–4 (3–2 MEAC)
- Head coach: Bill Collick (2nd season)
- Home stadium: Alumni Stadium

1986 Mid-Eastern Athletic Conference football standings
	Conf.					Overall
Team	W		L		T	W		L		T
No. 20 North Carolina A&T $^	4	–	1	–	0	9	–	3	–	0
Howard	3	–	2	–	0	8	–	3	–	0
Delaware State	3	–	2	–	0	7	–	4	–	0
South Carolina State	3	–	2	–	0	5	–	6	–	0
Bethune–Cookman	2	–	3	–	0	3	–	8	–	0
Morgan State	0	–	5	–	0	1	–	9	–	0
$ – Conference champion; ^ – NCAA Division I-AA playoff participant; Rankings from NCAA Division I-AA Football Committee poll

The 1986 Delaware State Hornets football team represented Delaware State College (now known as Delaware State University) as a member of the Mid-Eastern Athletic Conference (MEAC) during the 1986 NCAA Division I-AA football season. Led by second-year head coach Bill Collick, the Hornets compiled an overall record of 7–4, with a mark of 3–2 in conference play, and finished tied for second in the MEAC.

== Schedule ==
Date	Opponent	Rank	Site	Result	Attendance	Source
August 30	vs. Southern*		Independence Stadium; Shreveport, LA	W 21–14	10,000	
September 6	at Boston University*		Nickerson Field; Boston, MA	W 30–9		
September 20	at Morgan State	No. 10	Hughes Stadium; Baltimore, MD	W 40–12		
October 4	vs. No. T–14 Jackson State*	No. 7	Franklin Field; Philadelphia, PA	L 25–28		
October 11	Connecticut*		Alumni Stadium; Dover, DE	W 32–31		
October 18	at Bethune–Cookman	No. T–14	Memorial Stadium; Daytona Beach, FL	W 34–17	3,000	
October 25	Towson State*	No. 12	Alumni Stadium; Dover, DE	W 10–6	4,500	
November 1	South Carolina State	No. 16	Alumni Stadium; Dover, DE	W 34–21	6,000	
November 8	at No. 20 North Carolina A&T	No. 14	Aggie Stadium; Greensboro, NC	L 17–20		
November 15	Northeastern*	No. 19	Alumni Stadium; Dover, DE	L 24–37	2,300	
November 22	at Howard		William H. Greene Stadium; Washington, DC	L 18–27		
*Non-conference game; Rankings from NCAA Division I-AA Football Committee Poll released prior to the game
