= 1986 Holy Cross Crusaders football team =

American college football season

1986 Holy Cross Crusaders football

Colonial League champion Lambert Cup winner
- Conference: Colonial League
- Record: 10–1 (4–0 Colonial)
- Head coach: Mark Duffner (1st season)
- Defensive coordinator: Kevin Coyle (1st season)
- Home stadium: Fitton Field

1986 Colonial League football standings
	Conf.					Overall
Team	W		L		T	W		L		T
No. 5 Holy Cross $	4	–	0	–	0	10	–	1	–	0
Lafayette	2	–	2	–	0	6	–	5	–	0
Lehigh	2	–	2	–	0	5	–	6	–	0
Colgate	1	–	3	–	0	4	–	7	–	0
Bucknell	1	–	3	–	0	3	–	7	–	0
$ – Conference champion; Rankings from NCAA Division I-AA Football Committee poll

The 1986 Holy Cross Crusaders football team was an American football team that represented the College of the Holy Cross as a member of the Colonial League during the 1986 NCAA Division I-AA football season. In its first year under head coach Mark Duffner, the team compiled a 10–1 record (4–0 against conference opponents) and won the first Colonial League championship. The team played its home games at Fitton Field in Worcester, Massachusetts.

== Schedule ==
Date	Opponent	Site	Result	Attendance	Source
September 13	Lehigh	Fitton Field; Worcester, MA	W 17–14	15,781	
September 20	at Lafayette	Fisher Field; Easton, PA	W 38–14	12,700	
September 27	at Harvard*	Harvard Stadium; Boston, MA	W 41–0	12,540	
October 4	at Colgate	Andy Kerr Stadium; Hamilton, NY	W 16–12	5,000	
October 11	Dartmouth^{†}*	Fitton Field; Worcester, MA	W 48–7	14,171	
October 18	at Army*	Michie Stadium; West Point, NY	W 17–14	40,884	
October 25	at Brown*	Brown Stadium; Providence, RI	W 22–7	11,500	
November 1	UMass*	Fitton Field; Worcester, MA	W 41–7	18,861	
November 8	Bucknell	Fitton Field; Worcester, MA	W 17–10	9,041	
November 15	at William & Mary*	Cary Field; Williamsburg, VA	W 31–7	17,450	
November 22	Boston College*	Fitton Field; Worcester, MA	L 26–56	23,271	
*Non-conference game; ^{†}Homecoming

== Roster ==
1986 Holy Cross Crusaders football team roster
Players
Coaches
Offense

Pos.	#	Name	Class
WR	41	Wally Dembowski	Jr
RB, CB	17	Gordie Lockbaum	Jr

Defense

Pos.	#	Name	Class
FS	20	Tom Estep	Jr
LB	55	Jerry McCabe	Sr
LB	58	Rob McGovern	So

Special teams

Pos.	#	Name	Class

Head coach

- Mark Duffner

Coordinators/assistant coaches

Legend

- (C) Team captain
- (S) Suspended
- (I) Ineligible
- Injured
- Redshirt
