= 1986 UMass Minutemen football team =

American college football season

1986 UMass Minutemen football

Yankee Conference co-champion
- Conference: Yankee Conference
- Record: 8–3 (5–2 Yankee)
- Head coach: Jim Reid (1st season)
- Home stadium: Warren McGuirk Alumni Stadium

1986 Yankee Conference football standings
	Conf.					Overall
Team	W		L		T	W		L		T
No. 13 Delaware +^	5	–	2	–	0	9	–	4	–	0
No. 19 Connecticut +	5	–	2	–	0	8	–	3	–	0
UMass +	5	–	2	–	0	8	–	3	–	0
New Hampshire	4	–	3	–	0	7	–	4	–	0
Maine	3	–	4	–	0	7	–	4	–	0
Richmond	3	–	4	–	0	4	–	7	–	0
Boston University	3	–	4	–	0	4	–	7	–	0
Rhode Island	0	–	7	–	0	1	–	10	–	0
+ – Conference co-champions; ^ – NCAA Division I-AA playoff participant; Rankings from NCAA Division I-AA Football Committee poll

The 1986 UMass Minutemen football team represented the University of Massachusetts Amherst in the 1986 NCAA Division I-AA football season as a member of the Yankee Conference. The team was coached by Jim Reid and played its home games at Warren McGuirk Alumni Stadium in Hadley, Massachusetts. The 1986 season was notable as it was Jim Reid's first as coach of the Minutemen. Reid led UMass to their first conference championship since 1982. UMass finished the season with a record of 8–3 overall and 5–2 in conference play.

== Schedule ==
Date	Opponent	Site	Result	Attendance	Source
September 6	at James Madison*	JMU Stadium; Harrisonburg, VA	W 16–14	12,400	
September 13	Richmond	McGuirk Stadium; Hadley, MA	W 24–21	13,642	
September 27	Northeastern*	McGuirk Stadium; Hadley, MA	W 31–28	13,753	
October 4	at Rhode Island	Meade Stadium; Kingston, RI	W 31–14	6,356	
October 11	No. 15 Delaware	McGuirk Stadium; Hadley, MA	L 13–41	13,888	
October 18	at Maine	The Ballpark; Old Orchard Beach, ME	W 23–13	8,500	
October 25	at Boston University	Nickerson Field; Boston, MA	W 34–25	12,249	
November 1	at Holy Cross*	Fitton Field; Worcester, MA	L 7–41	18,861	
November 8	at Harvard*	Harvard Stadium; Boston, MA	W 17–7	1,250	
November 15	New Hampshire	McGuirk Stadium; Hadley, MA (rivalry)	W 38–31	8,117	
November 22	Connecticut	McGuirk Stadium; Hadley, MA (rivalry)	L 17–20	10,973	
*Non-conference game; Rankings from NCAA Division I-AA Football Committee Poll released prior to the game
