= 1986 New Hampshire Wildcats football team =

American college football season

1986 New Hampshire Wildcats football
- Conference: Yankee Conference
- Record: 7–4 (4–3 Yankee)
- Head coach: Bill Bowes (15th season)
- Offensive coordinator: Mark Whipple (1st season)
- Home stadium: Cowell Stadium

1986 Yankee Conference football standings
	Conf.					Overall
Team	W		L		T	W		L		T
No. 13 Delaware +^	5	–	2	–	0	9	–	4	–	0
No. 19 Connecticut +	5	–	2	–	0	8	–	3	–	0
UMass +	5	–	2	–	0	8	–	3	–	0
New Hampshire	4	–	3	–	0	7	–	4	–	0
Maine	3	–	4	–	0	7	–	4	–	0
Richmond	3	–	4	–	0	4	–	7	–	0
Boston University	3	–	4	–	0	4	–	7	–	0
Rhode Island	0	–	7	–	0	1	–	10	–	0
+ – Conference co-champions; ^ – NCAA Division I-AA playoff participant; Rankings from NCAA Division I-AA Football Committee poll

The 1986 New Hampshire Wildcats football team was an American football team that represented the University of New Hampshire as a member of the Yankee Conference during the 1986 NCAA Division I-AA football season. In its 15th year under head coach Bill Bowes, the team compiled a 7–4 record (4–3 against conference opponents) and finished fourth out of eight teams in the Yankee Conference.

== Schedule ==
Date	Opponent	Rank	Site	Result	Attendance	Source
September 6	at No. T–9 Richmond		City Stadium; Richmond, VA	L 12–38	15,117	
September 13	at No. 6 Delaware		Delaware Stadium; Newark, DE	W 28–21 ^{OT}	17,294	
September 20	Boston University		Cowell Stadium; Durham, NH	W 26–9		
September 27	at Dartmouth*		Memorial Field; Hanover, NH (rivalry)	W 66–12	9,927	
October 4	No. 18 Connecticut		Cowell Stadium; Durham, NH	W 42–19		
October 11	at Lafayette*	No. 14	Fisher Field; Easton, PA	W 20–16	12,500	
October 25	at Northeastern*	No. 13	Parsons Field; Brookline, MA	W 24–21	5,600	
November 1	Rhode Island	No. 11	Cowell Stadium; Durham, NH	W 28–24	10,350	
November 8	Maine	No. 11	Cowell Stadium; Durham, NH (rivalry)	L 13–14		
November 15	at UMass	No. 20	McGuirk Stadium; Hadley, MA (rivalry)	L 31–38	8,117	
November 22	Colgate*		Cowell Stadium; Durham, NH	L 23–27	3,075	
*Non-conference game; Rankings from NCAA Division I-AA Football Committee Poll released prior to the game
