= 1986 Richmond Spiders football team =

American college football season

1986 Richmond Spiders football
- Conference: Yankee Conference
- Record: 4–7 (3–4 Yankee)
- Head coach: Dal Shealy (7th season)
- Home stadium: UR Stadium

1986 Yankee Conference football standings
	Conf.					Overall
Team	W		L		T	W		L		T
No. 13 Delaware +^	5	–	2	–	0	9	–	4	–	0
No. 19 Connecticut +	5	–	2	–	0	8	–	3	–	0
UMass +	5	–	2	–	0	8	–	3	–	0
New Hampshire	4	–	3	–	0	7	–	4	–	0
Maine	3	–	4	–	0	7	–	4	–	0
Richmond	3	–	4	–	0	4	–	7	–	0
Boston University	3	–	4	–	0	4	–	7	–	0
Rhode Island	0	–	7	–	0	1	–	10	–	0
+ – Conference co-champions; ^ – NCAA Division I-AA playoff participant; Rankings from NCAA Division I-AA Football Committee poll

The 1986 Richmond Spiders football team was an American football team that represented the University of Richmond as a member of the Yankee Conference during the 1986 NCAA Division I-AA football season. In their seventh season under head coach Dal Shealy, Richmond compiled a 4–7 record, with a mark of 3–4 in conference play, finishing tied for fifth in the Yankee.

== Schedule ==
Date	Opponent	Rank	Site	Result	Attendance	Source
September 6	New Hampshire	No. T–9	UR Stadium; Richmond, VA	W 38–12	15,117	
September 13	at UMass	No. T–9	McGuirk Stadium; Hadley, MA	L 21–24	13,642	
September 20	at Connecticut		Memorial Stadium; Storrs, CT	L 22–29	10,742	
September 27	No. 19 Delaware		UR Stadium; Richmond, VA	L 19–20	17,423	
October 4	Boston University		UR Stadium; Richmond, VA	W 56–15	10,648	
October 18	VMI*		UR Stadium; Richmond, VA (rivalry)	W 40–9	18,712	
October 25	at Rhode Island		Meade Stadium; Kingston, RI	W 28–14	7,944	
November 1	at Georgia*		Sanford Stadium; Athens, GA	L 13–28	74,785	
November 8	Virginia Tech*		UR Stadium; Richmond, VA	L 10–17	22,600	
November 15	Maine		UR Stadium; Richmond, VA	L 11–26	11,617	
November 22	No. 9 William & Mary*		UR Stadium; Richmond, VA (rivalry)	L 14–21	19,743	
*Non-conference game; Rankings from NCAA Division I-AA Football Committee Poll released prior to the game
