= 1986 Colgate Red Raiders football team =

American college football season

1986 Colgate Red Raiders football
- Conference: Colonial League
- Record: 4–7 (1–3 Colonial)
- Head coach: Frederick Dunlap (11th season)
- Captains: Eric Rosenmeier; Scott Montross
- Home stadium: Andy Kerr Stadium

1986 Colonial League football standings
	Conf.					Overall
Team	W		L		T	W		L		T
No. 5 Holy Cross $	4	–	0	–	0	10	–	1	–	0
Lafayette	2	–	2	–	0	6	–	5	–	0
Lehigh	2	–	2	–	0	5	–	6	–	0
Colgate	1	–	3	–	0	4	–	7	–	0
Bucknell	1	–	3	–	0	3	–	7	–	0
$ – Conference champion; Rankings from NCAA Division I-AA Football Committee poll

The 1986 Colgate Red Raiders football team was an American football team that represented Colgate University during the 1986 NCAA Division I-AA football season. In the first year of play for the Colonial League, Colgate tied for last place.

In its 11th season under head coach Frederick Dunlap, the team compiled a 4–7 record. Erik Rosenmeier and Scott Montross were the team captains.

Colgate's 1–3 conference record tied for fourth in the five-team Colonial League standings. The Red Raiders outscored all opponents 312 to 274.

Colgate was No. 16 in the first week of Division I-AA national rankings, but dropped out of the top 20 in time for its second game, and remained unranked through the end of the season.

The team played its home games at Andy Kerr Stadium in Hamilton, New York.

== Schedule ==
Date	Opponent	Rank	Site	Result	Attendance	Source
September 6	at No. 19 William & Mary*	No. 16	Cary Field; Williamsburg, VA	L 21–42	8,620	
September 20	at Lehigh		Taylor Stadium; Bethlehem, PA	L 39–41	11,500	
September 27	Cornell*		Andy Kerr Stadium; Hamilton, NY (rivalry)	L 12–21	8,000	
October 4	No. 11 Holy Cross		Andy Kerr Stadium; Hamilton, NY	L 12–16	5,000	
October 11	at Yale*		Yale Bowl; New Haven, CT	L 23–28	22,148	
October 18	at Bucknell		Memorial Stadium; Lewisburg, PA	L 39–40	8,860	
October 25	at Columbia*		Wien Stadium; New York, NY	W 54–8	4,640	
November 1	Lafayette		Andy Kerr Stadium; Hamilton, NY	W 42–7	5,700	
November 8	at Brown*		Brown Stadium; Providence, RI	W 27–3	1,000	
November 15	at Boston University*		Nickerson Field; Boston, MA	L 17–45	2,122	
November 22	at New Hampshire*		Cowell Stadium; Durham, NH	W 27–23	3,075	
*Non-conference game; Rankings from NCAA Division I-AA Football Committee Poll released prior to the game

== Roster ==
1986 Colgate Red Raiders football team roster
Players
Coaches
Offense

Pos.	#	Name	Class
OT	77	Eric Anderson	Sr
WR	81	Sam Baker	So
QB	10	Doug Barker	So
WR	29	Glen Chaffee	Jr
FB	42	Barry Chubb	Sr
TE	84	Bryan Fair	Jr
RB	2	Kenny Gamble	Jr
QB	14	Mark Hulbert	Sr
OT	77	Scott Lesperance	Sr
TE	86	Mike Orie	Jr
C	65	Erik Rosenmeier	Sr
G	71	Brian Smith	Jr
G	62	Alan Swan	Sr

Defense

Pos.	#	Name	Class
DE	54	Steve Bauman	Sr
DE	47	Don Bedell	Jr
FS	30	Scott Bleczinski	Sr
LB	15	Juan Dela Rosa	So
LB	57	Matt Jaworski	So
DB	33	Tony Kemp	Fr
LB	58	Greg Manusky	Sr
SS	32	Scott Montross	Sr
LB	55	Dan Nole	So
DE	41	Kyle Warwick	Jr
DB	31	Jeff Way	So

Special teams

Pos.	#	Name	Class

Head coach

- Frederick Dunlap

Coordinators/assistant coaches

Legend

- (C) Team captain
- (S) Suspended
- (I) Ineligible
- Injured
- Redshirt
