= 1986 Bethune–Cookman Wildcats football team =

American college football season

1986 Bethune–Cookman Wildcats football
- Conference: Mid-Eastern Athletic Conference
- Record: 3–8 (2–3 MEAC)
- Head coach: Larry Little (4th season)
- Home stadium: Memorial Stadium

1986 Mid-Eastern Athletic Conference football standings
	Conf.					Overall
Team	W		L		T	W		L		T
No. 20 North Carolina A&T $^	4	–	1	–	0	9	–	3	–	0
Howard	3	–	2	–	0	8	–	3	–	0
Delaware State	3	–	2	–	0	7	–	4	–	0
South Carolina State	3	–	2	–	0	5	–	6	–	0
Bethune–Cookman	2	–	3	–	0	3	–	8	–	0
Morgan State	0	–	5	–	0	1	–	9	–	0
$ – Conference champion; ^ – NCAA Division I-AA playoff participant; Rankings from NCAA Division I-AA Football Committee poll

The 1986 Bethune–Cookman Wildcats football team represented Bethune–Cookman College (now known as Bethune–Cookman University) as a member of the Mid-Eastern Athletic Conference (MEAC) during the 1986 NCAA Division I-AA football season. Led by fourth-year head coach Larry Little, the Wildcats compiled an overall record of 3–8, with a mark of 2–3 in conference play, and finished fifth in the MEAC.

== Schedule ==
Date	Opponent	Site	Result	Attendance	Source
September 6	at UCF*	Florida Citrus Bowl; Orlando, FL	L 14–26	23,041	
September 13	Morgan State	Memorial Stadium; Daytona Beach, FL	W 52–9	2,150	
September 20	at Howard	William H. Greene Stadium; Washington, DC	W 30–6	1,000	
September 27	vs. No. 16 Grambling State*	Gator Bowl Stadium; Jacksonville, FL	L 24–30	22,000	
October 11	at No. 3 Georgia Southern*	Paulson Stadium; Statesboro, GA	L 31–52	14,321	
October 18	No. T–14 Delaware State	Memorial Stadium; Daytona Beach, FL	L 17–34	3,000	
October 25	South Carolina State	Memorial Stadium; Daytona Beach, FL	L 14–28	10,800	
November 1	at North Carolina A&T	Aggie Stadium; Greensboro, NC	L 24–30 ^{OT}		
November 8	vs. No. 9 Tennessee State*	Miami Orange Bowl; Miami, FL	L 10–13	12,500	
November 15	Morris Brown*	Memorial Stadium; Daytona Beach, FL	W 20–13		
November 29	vs. Florida A&M*	Tampa Stadium; Tampa, FL (rivalry)	L 6–16	36,610	
*Non-conference game; Rankings from NCAA Division I-AA Football Committee Poll released prior to the game
