= 1986 Brown Bears football team =

American college football season

1986 Brown Bears football
- Conference: Ivy League
- Record: 5–4–1 (4–2–1 Ivy)
- Head coach: John Rosenberg (3rd season)
- Captains: R. Collett; Jeff Garrison; Brian Murphy
- Home stadium: Brown Stadium

1986 Ivy League football standings
	Conf.					Overall
Team	W		L		T	W		L		T
No. 7 Penn $	7	–	0	–	0	10	–	0	–	0
Cornell	6	–	1	–	0	8	–	2	–	0
Brown	4	–	2	–	1	5	–	4	–	1
Dartmouth	3	–	3	–	1	3	–	6	–	1
Harvard	3	–	4	–	0	3	–	7	–	0
Yale	2	–	5	–	0	3	–	7	–	0
Princeton	2	–	5	–	0	2	–	8	–	0
Columbia	0	–	7	–	0	0	–	10	–	0
$ – Conference champion; Rankings from NCAA Division I-AA Football Committee poll

The 1986 Brown Bears football team was an American football team that represented Brown University during the 1986 NCAA Division I-AA football season. Brown finished fourth in the Ivy League.

In their third season under head coach John Rosenberg, the Bears compiled a 5–4–1 record and outscored opponents 188 to 181. R. Collett, Jeff Garrison and Brian Murphy were the team captains.

The Bears' 4–2–1 conference record placed third in the Ivy League standings. They outscored Ivy opponents 152 to 125.

Brown played its home games at Brown Stadium in Providence, Rhode Island.

== Schedule ==
Date	Opponent	Site	Result	Attendance	Source
September 20	Yale	Brown Stadium; Providence, RI	W 21–7	11,300	
September 27	at Rhode Island*	Meade Stadium; Kingston, RI	W 27–7	9,515	
October 4	at Princeton	Palmer Stadium; Princeton, NJ	W 24–10	9,375	
October 11	No. 19 Penn	Brown Stadium; Providence, RI	L 0–34	11,500	
October 18	at Cornell	Schoellkopf Field; Ithaca, NY	L 9–27	12,300	
October 25	No. 6 Holy Cross*	Brown Stadium; Providence, RI	L 7–22	11,500	
November 1	at Harvard	Harvard Stadium; Boston, MA	W 31–19	12,540	
November 8	Colgate*	Brown Stadium; Providence, RI	L 3–27	1,000	
November 15	Dartmouth	Brown Stadium; Providence, RI	T 21–21	6,350	
November 22	at Columbia	Wien Stadium; New York, NY	W 45–7	3,010	
*Non-conference game; Rankings from the latest NCAA Division I-AA poll released prior to the game
