= 1986 Harvard Crimson football team =

American college football season

1986 Harvard Crimson football
- Conference: Ivy League
- Record: 3–7 (3–4 Ivy)
- Head coach: Joe Restic (16th season)
- Captain: Scott C. Collins
- Home stadium: Harvard Stadium

1986 Ivy League football standings
	Conf.					Overall
Team	W		L		T	W		L		T
No. 7 Penn $	7	–	0	–	0	10	–	0	–	0
Cornell	6	–	1	–	0	8	–	2	–	0
Brown	4	–	2	–	1	5	–	4	–	1
Dartmouth	3	–	3	–	1	3	–	6	–	1
Harvard	3	–	4	–	0	3	–	7	–	0
Yale	2	–	5	–	0	3	–	7	–	0
Princeton	2	–	5	–	0	2	–	8	–	0
Columbia	0	–	7	–	0	0	–	10	–	0
$ – Conference champion; Rankings from NCAA Division I-AA Football Committee poll

The 1986 Harvard Crimson football team was an American football team that represented Harvard University during the 1986 NCAA Division I-AA football season. The Crimson finished fifth in the Ivy League.

In their 16th year under head coach Joe Restic, the Crimson compiled a 3–7 record and were outscored 190 to 139. Scott C. Collins was the team captain.

Harvard's 3–4 conference record placed fifth in the Ivy League standings. The Crimson outscored Ivy opponents 132 to 108.

Harvard played its home games at Harvard Stadium in the Allston neighborhood of Boston, Massachusetts.

== Schedule ==
Date	Opponent	Site	Result	Attendance	Source
September 20	Columbia	Harvard Stadium; Boston, MA	W 34–0	7,534	
September 27	Holy Cross*	Harvard Stadium; Boston, MA	L 0–41	12,540	
October 4	at No. T–5 William & Mary*	Cary Field; Williamsburg, VA	L 0–24	13,100	
October 11	Cornell	Harvard Stadium; Boston, MA	L 0–3	17,531	
October 18	at Dartmouth	Memorial Field; Hanover, NH (rivalry)	W 42–26	15,618	
October 25	at Princeton	Palmer Stadium; Princeton, NJ (rivalry)	L 3–14	20,500	
November 1	Brown	Harvard Stadium; Boston, MA	L 19–31	12,540	
November 8	UMass*	Harvard Stadium; Boston, MA	L 7–17	1,250	
November 15	at No. 6 Penn	Franklin Field; Philadelphia, PA	L 10–17	25,650	
November 22	Yale	Harvard Stadium; Boston, MA (The Game)	W 24–17	40,000	
*Non-conference game; Rankings from NCAA Division I-AA Football Committee Poll released prior to the game
