= George Landis =

American football coach

Current position
- Title: Defensive backs coach
- Team: Central Dauphin HS (PA)

Playing career

Football
- 1968–1970: Penn State
- Position: Defensive back

Coaching career (HC unless noted)

Football
- c. 1972: Penn State (assistant)
- 1973–1974: Villanova (DB)
- 1975–1976: Cornell (DB)
- 1977: Mainland HS (NJ)
- 1978–1981: Dartmouth (DB)
- 1982–1985: Bloomsburg
- 1986–1988: Bucknell
- 1991: UConn (assistant)
- 1992–1993: Penn (OC)
- 2004–2005: Pine Grove HS (PA)
- 2006–2009: Central Dauphin East HS (PA)

Baseball
- 1981: Dartmouth

Head coaching record
- Overall: 34–37–2 (college football); 7–24 (college baseball)
- Tournaments: 1–1 (NCAA D-II playoffs)

Accomplishments and honors

Championships
- 1 PSAC (1985); 2 PSAC East Division (1984–1985)

Awards
- AFCA Division II COY (1985); First-team All-East (1970)

George Landis is an American football coach. He is the defensive backs coach at Central Dauphin High School in Harrisburg, Pennsylvania. Landis served as the head football coach at Bloomsburg University of Pennsylvania from 1982 to 1985 and Bucknell University from 1986 to 1988, compiling a career college football coaching record of 34–37–2. He was also the head baseball coach at Dartmouth College for one season, in 1981, tallying a mark of 7–24. Landis played college football at Pennsylvania State University.

Raised in Linwood, New Jersey, Landis played prep football at Mainland Regional High School.

== Head coaching record ==
=== College football ===
Year	Team	Overall	Conference	Standing	Bowl/playoffs	D2^{#}
Bloomsburg Huskies (Pennsylvania State Athletic Conference) (1982–1985)
1982	Bloomsburg	1–7–1	1–4–1	6th (East)		
1983	Bloomsburg	5–5	4–2	T–2nd (East)		
1984	Bloomsburg	5–5	5–1	T–1st (East)		
1985	Bloomsburg	12–1	6–0	1st (East)	L NCAA Division II Semifinal	3
Bloomsburg:		24–18–1	16–7–1			
Bucknell Bison (Colonial League) (1986–1988)
1986	Bucknell	3–7	1–3	T–4th		
1987	Bucknell	4–5–1	1–3–1	5th		
1988	Bucknell	3–7	2–3	T–3rd		
Bucknell:		10–19–1	4–9–1			
Total:		34–37–2				
National championship Conference title Conference division title or championship game berth
