= 1986 Connecticut Huskies football team =

American college football season

1986 Connecticut Huskies football

Yankee Conference co-champion
- Conference: Yankee Conference
- Record: 8–3 (5–2 Yankee)
- Head coach: Tom Jackson (4th season)
- Home stadium: Memorial Stadium

1986 Yankee Conference football standings
	Conf.					Overall
Team	W		L		T	W		L		T
No. 13 Delaware +^	5	–	2	–	0	9	–	4	–	0
No. 19 Connecticut +	5	–	2	–	0	8	–	3	–	0
UMass +	5	–	2	–	0	8	–	3	–	0
New Hampshire	4	–	3	–	0	7	–	4	–	0
Maine	3	–	4	–	0	7	–	4	–	0
Richmond	3	–	4	–	0	4	–	7	–	0
Boston University	3	–	4	–	0	4	–	7	–	0
Rhode Island	0	–	7	–	0	1	–	10	–	0
+ – Conference co-champions; ^ – NCAA Division I-AA playoff participant; Rankings from NCAA Division I-AA Football Committee poll

The 1986 Connecticut Huskies football team represented the University of Connecticut in the 1986 NCAA Division I-AA football season. The Huskies were led by fourth-year head coach Tom Jackson, and completed the season with a record of 8–3.

== Schedule ==
Date	Opponent	Rank	Site	Result	Attendance	Source
September 13	Central Connecticut*		Memorial Stadium; Storrs, CT	W 20–9	7,529	
September 20	Richmond		Memorial Stadium; Storrs, CT	W 29–22	10,742	
September 27	at Yale*	No. 20	Yale Bowl; New Haven, CT	W 17–12	25,175	
October 4	at New Hampshire	No. 18	Cowell Stadium; Durham, NH	L 19–42		
October 11	at No. T–14 Delaware State*		Alumni Stadium; Dover, DE	L 31–32		
October 18	at Northeastern*		Parsons Field; Brookline, MA	W 26–20	4,200	
October 25	Maine		Memorial Stadium; Storrs, CT	W 35–19		
November 1	Boston University^{†}		Memorial Stadium; Storrs, CT	W 24–7	11,073	
November 8	at No. T–14 Delaware		Delaware Stadium; Newark, DE	L 7–35	15,855	
November 15	Rhode Island		Memorial Stadium; Storrs, CT (rivalry)	W 21–14 ^{OT}	3,769	
November 22	at UMass		Warren McGuirk Alumni Stadium; Amherst, MA (rivalry)	W 20–17	10,973	
*Non-conference game; ^{†}Homecoming; Rankings from NCAA Division I-AA Football Committee Poll released prior to the game
