= 1986 Maine Black Bears football team =

American college football season

1986 Maine Black Bears football
- Conference: Yankee Conference
- Record: 7–4 (3–4 Yankee)
- Head coach: Buddy Teevens (2nd season)
- Offensive coordinator: Tim Murphy (2nd season)
- Defensive coordinator: John Lovett (2nd season)
- Captains: Tim Cahill; Steve Donahue
- Home stadium: Alumni Field

1986 Yankee Conference football standings
	Conf.					Overall
Team	W		L		T	W		L		T
No. 13 Delaware +^	5	–	2	–	0	9	–	4	–	0
No. 19 Connecticut +	5	–	2	–	0	8	–	3	–	0
UMass +	5	–	2	–	0	8	–	3	–	0
New Hampshire	4	–	3	–	0	7	–	4	–	0
Maine	3	–	4	–	0	7	–	4	–	0
Richmond	3	–	4	–	0	4	–	7	–	0
Boston University	3	–	4	–	0	4	–	7	–	0
Rhode Island	0	–	7	–	0	1	–	10	–	0
+ – Conference co-champions; ^ – NCAA Division I-AA playoff participant; Rankings from NCAA Division I-AA Football Committee poll

The 1986 Maine Black Bears football team was an American football team that represented the University of Maine as a member of the Yankee Conference during the 1986 NCAA Division I-AA football season. In their second and final season under head coach Buddy Teevens, the Black Bears compiled a 7–4 record (3–4 against conference opponents) and tied for fifth place in the Yankee Conference. Tim Cahill and Steve Donahue were the team captains.

== Schedule ==
Date	Opponent	Rank	Site	Result	Attendance	Source
September 6	at Howard*		William H. Greene Stadium; Washington, DC	W 38–22	8,000	
September 13	American International		Alumni Field; Orono, ME	W 33–7		
September 20	Rhode Island		Alumni Field; Orono, ME	W 34–14	7,200	
September 25	at Boston University*	No. T–13	Nickerson Field; Boston, MA	L 23–26	9,874	
October 4	at Central Connecticut State		Veterans Stadium; New Britain, CT	W 28–7		
October 11	Northeastern*		Alumni Field; Orono, ME	W 38–21		
October 18	vs. UMass		The Ballpark; Old Orchard Beach, ME	L 13–23	8,500	
October 25	at Connecticut		Memorial Stadium; Storrs, CT	L 19–35		
November 1	No. 15 Delaware		Alumni Field; Orono, ME	L 31–34	3,500	
November 8	at No. 11 New Hampshire		Cowell Stadium; Durham, NH	W 14–13		
November 15	at Richmond		UR Stadium; Richmond, VA	W 26–11	11,617	
*Non-conference game; Rankings from NCAA Division I-AA Football Committee Poll released prior to the game
