= 1986 Penn Quakers football team =

American college football season

1986 Penn Quakers football

Ivy League champion
- Conference: Ivy League

Ranking
- Coaches: No. 7
- Record: 10–0 (7–0 Ivy)
- Head coach: Ed Zubrow (1st season)
- Offensive coordinator: Dick Maloney (1st season)
- Captains: Steve Buonato; Brad Heinz
- Home stadium: Franklin Field

1986 Ivy League football standings
| | Conf. | | | | | Overall |
| Team | W | | L | | T | W | | L | | T |
|---|---|---|---|---|---|---|---|---|---|---|
| No. 7 Penn $ | 7 | – | 0 | – | 0 | 10 | – | 0 | – | 0 |
| Cornell | 6 | – | 1 | – | 0 | 8 | – | 2 | – | 0 |
| Brown | 4 | – | 2 | – | 1 | 5 | – | 4 | – | 1 |
| Dartmouth | 3 | – | 3 | – | 1 | 3 | – | 6 | – | 1 |
| Harvard | 3 | – | 4 | – | 0 | 3 | – | 7 | – | 0 |
| Yale | 2 | – | 5 | – | 0 | 3 | – | 7 | – | 0 |
| Princeton | 2 | – | 5 | – | 0 | 2 | – | 8 | – | 0 |
| Columbia | 0 | – | 7 | – | 0 | 0 | – | 10 | – | 0 |
$ – Conference champion; Rankings from NCAA Division I-AA Football Committee poll

The 1986 Penn Quakers football team represented the University of Pennsylvania in the 1986 NCAA Division I-AA football season. Penn went undefeated (10-0), won the Ivy League Championship, and ranked 7 in NCAA Division I-AA.

== Schedule ==
| Date | Opponent | Rank | Site | Result | Attendance | Source |
|---|---|---|---|---|---|---|
| September 20 | at Dartmouth | | Memorial Field; Hanover, NH | W 21–7 | 7,260 | |
| September 27 | Bucknell* | | Franklin Field; Philadelphia, PA | W 10–7 | 15,241 | |
| October 4 | Columbia | | Franklin Field; Philadelphia, PA | W 42–7 | 10,878 | |
| October 11 | at Brown | No. 19 | Brown Stadium; Providence, RI | W 34–0 | 11,500 | |
| October 18 | at Navy* | No. 17 | Navy–Marine Corps Memorial Stadium; Annapolis, MD | W 30–26 | 23,959 | |
| October 25 | Yale | No. 12 | Franklin Field; Philadelphia, PA | W 24–6 | 32,761 | |
| November 1 | at Princeton | No. 8 | Palmer Stadium; Princeton, NJ (rivalry) | W 23–10 | 18,500 | |
| November 8 | Lafayette* | No. 6 | Franklin Field; Philadelphia, PA | W 42–14 | 9,210 | |
| November 15 | Harvard | No. 6 | Franklin Field; Philadelphia, PA (rivalry) | W 17–10 | 25,650 | |
| November 22 | at No. 15 Cornell | No. 6 | Schoellkopf Field; Ithaca, NY (rivalry) | W 31–21 | 22,000 | |
*Non-conference game; Rankings from NCAA Division I-AA Football Committee Poll released prior to the game

== Roster ==
1986 Penn Quakers football team roster
| Players | | | Coaches |
|---|---|---|---|
| Offense: Pos. / # / Name / Class; QB / 7 / Jim Crocicchia / Sr | Defense: Pos. / # / Name / Class | Special teams: Pos. / # / Name / Class | Head coach: Ed Zubrow; Coordinators/assistant coaches Legend: (C) Team captain; (S) Suspended; (I) Ineligible; Injured; Redshirt |
