= 1986 Lehigh Engineers football team =

American college football season

1986 Lehigh Engineers football
- Conference: Colonial League
- Record: 5–6 (2–2 Colonial)
- Head coach: Hank Small (1st season)
- Captains: Mike Kosko; Joe Uliana
- Home stadium: Taylor Stadium

1986 Colonial League football standings
	Conf.					Overall
Team	W		L		T	W		L		T
No. 5 Holy Cross $	4	–	0	–	0	10	–	1	–	0
Lafayette	2	–	2	–	0	6	–	5	–	0
Lehigh	2	–	2	–	0	5	–	6	–	0
Colgate	1	–	3	–	0	4	–	7	–	0
Bucknell	1	–	3	–	0	3	–	7	–	0
$ – Conference champion; Rankings from NCAA Division I-AA Football Committee poll

The 1986 Lehigh Engineers football team was an American football team that represented Lehigh University during the 1986 NCAA Division I-AA football season. In the first year of play for the Colonial League, Lehigh tied for second place.

In their first year under head coach Hank Small, the Engineers compiled a 5–6 record. Mike "The Tambourine Man" Kosko and Joe Uliana were the team captains and received All-American honors. This was also Senior OLB Perry Smith's final year where he capped his career by sacking Delaware Quarterback and future NFL MVP Rich Gannon 2 times albeit in a loss after beating Delaware in the previous 3 years.

Lehigh's 2–2 conference record tied for second in the five-team Colonial League standings. Against all opponents, the Engineers were outscored 300 to 258.

Lehigh played its home games at Taylor Stadium on the university's main campus in Bethlehem, Pennsylvania.

== Schedule ==
Date	Opponent	Site	Result	Attendance	Source
September 13	at Holy Cross	Fitton Field; Worcester, MA	L 14–17	15,781	
September 20	Colgate	Taylor Stadium; Bethlehem, PA	W 41–39	11,500	
September 27	at Navy*	Navy–Marine Corps Memorial Stadium; Annapolis, MD	L 0–41	21,388	
October 4	Northeastern*	Taylor Stadium; Bethlehem, PA	L 20–34	7,000	
October 11	No. 5 William & Mary*	Taylor Stadium; Bethlehem, PA	L 38–44	6,000	
October 18	Princeton*	Taylor Stadium; Bethlehem, PA	W 48–28	11,500	
October 25	at No. 16 Delaware*	Delaware Stadium; Newark, DE (rivalry)	L 17–28	17,685	
November 1	at Towson State*	Minnegan Field; Towson, MD	W 26–21	6,241	
November 8	West Chester*	Taylor Stadium; Bethlehem, PA	W 18–13	6,000	
November 15	Bucknell	Taylor Stadium; Bethlehem, PA	W 17–7	8,500	
November 22	at Lafayette	Fisher Field; Easton, PA (The Rivalry)	L 23–28	17,500	
*Non-conference game; Rankings from the latest NCAA Division I-AA poll released prior to the game
