= 1986 Rhode Island Rams football team =

American college football season

1986 Rhode Island Rams football
- Conference: Yankee Conference
- Record: 1–10 (0–7 Yankee)
- Head coach: Bob Griffin (11th season)
- Home stadium: Meade Stadium

1986 Yankee Conference football standings
| | Conf. | | | | | Overall |
| Team | W | | L | | T | W | | L | | T |
|---|---|---|---|---|---|---|---|---|---|---|
| No. 13 Delaware +^ | 5 | – | 2 | – | 0 | 9 | – | 4 | – | 0 |
| No. 19 Connecticut + | 5 | – | 2 | – | 0 | 8 | – | 3 | – | 0 |
| UMass + | 5 | – | 2 | – | 0 | 8 | – | 3 | – | 0 |
| New Hampshire | 4 | – | 3 | – | 0 | 7 | – | 4 | – | 0 |
| Maine | 3 | – | 4 | – | 0 | 7 | – | 4 | – | 0 |
| Richmond | 3 | – | 4 | – | 0 | 4 | – | 7 | – | 0 |
| Boston University | 3 | – | 4 | – | 0 | 4 | – | 7 | – | 0 |
| Rhode Island | 0 | – | 7 | – | 0 | 1 | – | 10 | – | 0 |
+ – Conference co-champions; ^ – NCAA Division I-AA playoff participant; Rankings from NCAA Division I-AA Football Committee poll

The 1986 Rhode Island Rams football team was an American football team that represented the University of Rhode Island in the Yankee Conference during the 1986 NCAA Division I-AA football season. In their 11th season under head coach Bob Griffin, the Rams compiled a 1–10 record (0–7 against conference opponents) and finished last out of eight teams in the conference.

== Schedule ==
| Date | Opponent | Site | Result | Attendance | Source |
|---|---|---|---|---|---|
| September 6 | at No. 6 Delaware | Delaware Stadium; Newark, DE | L 10–44 | 17,337 | |
| September 13 | Towson State* | Meade Stadium; Kingston, RI | L 14–35 | 6,967 | |
| September 20 | at Maine | Alumni Field; Orono, ME | L 14–34 | 7,200 | |
| September 27 | Brown* | Meade Stadium; Kingston, RI (rivalry) | L 7–27 | 9,515 | |
| October 4 | UMass | Meade Stadium; Kingston, RI | L 17–31 | 6,356 | |
| October 18 | Boston University^{†} | Meade Stadium; Kingston, RI | L 0–17 | 9,882 | |
| October 25 | Richmond | Meade Stadium; Kingston, RI | L 14–28 | 7,944 | |
| November 1 | at No. 11 New Hampshire | Cowell Stadium; Durham, NH | L 24–28 | 10,350 | |
| November 8 | Southern Connecticut* | Meade Stadium; Kingston, RI | W 34–18 | 2,543 | |
| November 15 | at Connecticut | Memorial Stadium; Storrs, CT (rivalry) | L 14–21 (OT) | 3,769 | |
| November 22 | at Northeastern* | Parsons Field; Brookline, MA | L 9–36 | 3,100 | |
*Non-conference game; ^{†}Homecoming; Rankings from NCAA Division I-AA Football Committee Poll released prior to the game
