= 1986 Morgan State Bears football team =

American college football season

1986 Morgan State Bears football
- Conference: Mid-Eastern Athletic Conference
- Record: 1–9 (0–5 MEAC)
- Head coach: Jesse Thomas (2nd season)
- Home stadium: Hughes Stadium

1986 Mid-Eastern Athletic Conference football standings
	Conf.					Overall
Team	W		L		T	W		L		T
No. 20 North Carolina A&T $^	4	–	1	–	0	9	–	3	–	0
Howard	3	–	2	–	0	8	–	3	–	0
Delaware State	3	–	2	–	0	7	–	4	–	0
South Carolina State	3	–	2	–	0	5	–	6	–	0
Bethune–Cookman	2	–	3	–	0	3	–	8	–	0
Morgan State	0	–	5	–	0	1	–	9	–	0
$ – Conference champion; ^ – NCAA Division I-AA playoff participant; Rankings from NCAA Division I-AA Football Committee poll

The 1986 Morgan State Bears football team represented Morgan State University as a member of the Mid-Eastern Athletic Conference (MEAC) during the 1986 NCAA Division I-AA football season. Led by second-year head coach Jesse Thomas, the Bears compiled an overall record of 1–9, with a mark of 0–5 in conference play, and finished sixth in the MEAC.

== Schedule ==
Date	Opponent	Site	Result	Attendance	Source
September 6	at Virginia Union*	Hovey Field; Richmond, VA	L 10–26	5,700	
September 13	at Bethune–Cookman	Memorial Stadium; Daytona Beach, FL	L 9–52	2,150	
September 20	No. 10 Delaware State	Hughes Stadium; Baltimore, MD	L 12–40		
September 27	North Carolina A&T	Hughes Stadium; Baltimore, MD	L 23–40	4,500	
October 4	Norfolk State*^{†}	Hughes Stadium; Baltimore, MD	L 21–23	9,000	
October 11	at South Carolina State	Oliver C. Dawson Stadium; Orangeburg, SC	L 0–35	14,185	
October 18	Towson State*	Hughes Stadium; Baltimore, MD (rivalry)	L 0–21	1,100	
October 25	No. 7 Tennessee State*	Hughes Stadium; Baltimore, MD	L 10–52	2,800	
November 1	at District of Columbia*	Cardozo High School Stadium; Washington, DC	W 21–16	1,500	
November 15	at Howard	William H. Greene Stadium; Washington, DC (rivalry)	L 6–60	8,114	
*Non-conference game; ^{†}Homecoming; Rankings from NCAA Division I-AA Football Committee Poll released prior to the game
