= 1986 Northeastern Huskies football team =

American college football season

1986 Northeastern Huskies football
- Conference: Independent
- Record: 4–6
- Head coach: Paul Pawlak (6th season)
- Home stadium: Parsons Field

1986 NCAA Division I-AA independents football standings
	Conf.			Overall
Team	W	L	T	W		L		T
No. 4 Georgia Southern ^		–		13	–	2	–	0
No. 14 Tennessee State ^		–		10	–	2	–	1
No. 8 William & Mary ^		–		9	–	3	–	0
Eastern Washington		–		5	–	5	–	0
James Madison		–		5	–	5	–	1
Florida A&M		–		5	–	6	–	0
Northeastern		–		4	–	6	–	0
Western Kentucky		–		4	–	6	–	1
^ – NCAA Division I-AA playoff participant; Rankings from NCAA Division I-AA Football Committee poll

The 1986 Northeastern Huskies football team was an American football team that represented Northeastern University as an independent during the 1986 NCAA Division I-AA football season. Led by sixth-year head coach Paul Pawlak, the team compiled a 4–6 record.

== Schedule ==
Date	Opponent	Site	Result	Attendance	Source
September 13	at The Citadel	Johnson Hagood Stadium; Charleston, SC	L 14–24	14,583	
September 20	Youngstown State	Parsons Field; Brookline, MA	W 23–21	1,200	
September 27	at UMass	McGuirk Stadium; Hadley, MA	L 28–31	13,753	
October 4	at Lehigh	Taylor Stadium; Bethlehem, PA	W 34–20	7,000	
October 11	at Maine	Alumni Field; Orono, ME	L 21–38		
October 18	Connecticut	Parsons Field; Brookline, MA	L 20–26	4,200	
October 25	New Hampshire	Parsons Field; Brookline, MA	L 21–24	5,600	
November 1	James Madison	Parsons Field; Brookline, MA	L 2–15	4,010	
November 15	at No. 19 Delaware State	Alumni Stadium; Dover, DE	W 37–24	2,300	
November 22	Rhode Island	Parsons Field; Brookline, MA	W 36–9	3,100	
Rankings from NCAA Division I-AA Football Committee Poll released prior to the game
