= Dennis Thomas (American football) =

American football player (born 1953)

Biographical details
- Born: September 5, 1953 (age 73); Heidelberg, Mississippi, U.S.

Playing career
- 1971–1973: Alcorn State
- Position: Center

Coaching career (HC unless noted)
- 1975: Northeast Louisiana (DL)
- 1976–1978: Alcorn State (LB)
- 1979–1981: Alcorn State (DC)
- 1984: Alcorn State (DC)
- 1985: Alcorn State (AHC/DC)
- 1986–1988: South Carolina State

Administrative career (AD unless noted)
- 1990–2002: Hampton
- 2002–2021: MEAC (commissioner)

Head coaching record
- Overall: 15–18
- College Football Hall of Fame; Inducted in 2022 (profile)

Dennis E. Thomas (born September 5, 1953) is an American former gridiron football center, college football head coach, college sports athletic director, and collegiate athletic conference commissioner.

== Biography ==
=== Playing career ===
Thomas attended Southside High School in his hometown of Heidelberg, Mississippi, where he played football and competed in shot put. He then played college football at Alcorn A&M College (now Alcorn State University) during the early 1970s. A center and three-year letterman, he received first-team All-American honors from the Pittsburgh Courier for the 1972 and 1973 seasons. He was named the Southwestern Athletic Conference (SWAC) offensive player of the year for the 1973 season, becoming the first (and to date only) offensive lineman to win the award.

=== Post-playing career ===
Following his playing career, Thomas was a graduate assistant for Northeast Louisiana University (now the University of Louisiana at Monroe) during 1974 and became defensive line coach there in 1975. In 1976, he became linebacker coach at Alcorn State, joining the staff of Marino Casem. In 1979, Thomas was promoted to defensive coordinator. He took a leave of absence spanning the 1982 and 1983 seasons to pursue his academic career, then returned as defensive coordinator in 1984. In 1985, he was named assistant head coach, while retaining his defensive coordinator responsibilities.

In January 1986, Thomas left Alcorn State to become head coach of the South Carolina State Bulldogs football team. He compiled a record of 15–18 (.455) during the 1986–1988 seasons. From 1990 to 2002, he was the athletic director at Hampton University in Virginia. From 2002 to 2021, he served as commissioner of the Mid-Eastern Athletic Conference (MEAC).

=== Honors ===
In 2022, Thomas was inducted into the College Football Hall of Fame. He is also an inductee of the athletic hall of fame at Hampton University (2009), the athletic hall of fame at Alcorn State University (2010), the SWAC hall of fame (2003), and the Black College Football Hall of Fame (2020).

=== Personal life ===
While at Alcon A&M, Thomas was president of the Kappa Alpha Psi fraternity. In addition to a bachelor's degree from Alcorn State, Thomas holds a master's degree from the University of Louisiana at Monroe and a doctorate from the State University of New York at Buffalo. His brother Johnny Thomas also played for Alcorn State and served as the team's head coach from 1998 through 2007.

== Head coaching record ==
Year	Team	Overall	Conference	Standing	Bowl/playoffs
South Carolina State Bulldogs (Mid-Eastern Athletic Conference) (1986–1988)
1986	South Carolina State	5–6	3–2	T–3rd	
1987	South Carolina State	6–5	3–2	3rd	
1988	South Carolina State	4–7	3–3	T–4th	
South Carolina State:		15–18	9–7		
Total:		15–18			
