= 1987 Oklahoma Sooners football team =

American college football season

1987 Oklahoma Sooners football

Big 8 champion

Orange Bowl, L 14–20 vs. Miami (FL)
- Conference: Big Eight Conference

Ranking
- Coaches: No. 3
- AP: No. 3
- Record: 11–1 (7–0 Big 8)
- Head coach: Barry Switzer (15th season)
- Offensive coordinator: Jim Donnan (3rd season)
- Offensive scheme: Wishbone
- Defensive coordinator: Gary Gibbs (7th season)
- Base defense: 5–2
- Captains: Patrick Collins; Mark Hutson; Dante Jones; Darrell Reed; David Vickers
- Home stadium: Oklahoma Memorial Stadium

1987 Big Eight Conference football standings
	Conf.					Overall
Team	W		L		T	W		L		T
No. 3 Oklahoma $	7	–	0	–	0	11	–	1	–	0
No. 6 Nebraska	6	–	1	–	0	10	–	2	–	0
No. 11 Oklahoma State	5	–	2	–	0	10	–	2	–	0
Colorado	4	–	3	–	0	7	–	4	–	0
Missouri	3	–	4	–	0	5	–	6	–	0
Iowa State	2	–	5	–	0	3	–	8	–	0
Kansas	0	–	6	–	1	1	–	9	–	1
Kansas State	0	–	6	–	1	0	–	10	–	1
$ – Conference champion; Rankings from AP Poll

The 1987 Oklahoma Sooners football team represented the University of Oklahoma in the 1987 NCAA Division I-A football season. Oklahoma was a member of the Big Eight Conference played its home games in Oklahoma Memorial Stadium, where it has played its home games since 1923. The team posted an 11–1 overall record and a 7–0 conference record to the Conference title outright under head coach Barry Switzer who took the helm in 1973. This was Switzer's twelfth conference title, fourth consecutive conference title and eighth undefeated conference record in fifteen seasons.

The team was led by All-Americans Rickey Dixon (who won the Jim Thorpe Award), Mark Hutson, Keith Jackson, Danté Jones, and Darrell Reed After going undefeated in its eleven regular season games, it earned a trip to the Orange Bowl for an appearance against the Miami Hurricanes. During the season, it faced three ranked opponents (In order, #12 Oklahoma State, #1 Nebraska, and #2 Miami). Both of its last two games were #1 vs. #2 matches with the last being a national title game in which it endured its only loss to the resulting national champion Hurricanes. The game marked the third Miami victory over Oklahoma in three seasons to former Switzer assistant coach Jimmy Johnson.

Jamelle Holieway led the team in rushing for the second season with 807 yards and in passing for the third of four times with 548 yards, Jackson led the team in receiving for the third straight season with 403 yards, Placekicker R. D. Lashar led the team in scoring with 91 points, Reed posted 8 quarterback sacks, Jones led the team with 125 tackles and Dixon posted 9 interceptions. Dixon established the current school record total of 9 single-season interceptions. He set the school record for single-season interception return yards with 232 that season and the career record with 303, which was broken by Derrick Strait in 2003.

== Schedule ==
Date	Time	Opponent	Rank	Site	TV	Result	Attendance	Source
September 5	1:30 p.m.	North Texas State*	No. 1	Oklahoma Memorial Stadium; Norman, OK		W 69–14	75,004	
September 12	1:30 p.m.	North Carolina*	No. 1	Oklahoma Memorial Stadium; Norman, OK		W 28–0	75,004	
September 26	1:30 p.m.	at Tulsa*	No. 1	Skelly Stadium; Tulsa, OK		W 65–0	47,350	
October 3	1:30 p.m.	at Iowa State	No. 1	Cyclone Stadium; Ames, IA	PPV	W 56–3	36,050	
October 10	1:45 p.m.	vs. Texas*	No. 1	Cotton Bowl; Dallas, TX (Red River Shootout)	CBS	W 44–9	75,587	
October 17	1:10 p.m.	at Kansas State	No. 1	KSU Stadium; Manhattan, KS		W 59–10	27,200	
October 24	6:30 p.m.	Colorado	No. 1	Oklahoma Memorial Stadium; Norman, OK	ESPN	W 24–6	75,004	
October 31	1:00 p.m.	at Kansas	No. 1	Memorial Stadium; Lawrence, KS		W 71–10	23,500	
November 7	1:00 p.m.	No. 12 Oklahoma State	No. 1	Oklahoma Memorial Stadium; Norman, OK (Bedlam Series)		W 29–10	75,004	
November 14	1:30 p.m.	Missouri	No. 1	Oklahoma Memorial Stadium; Norman, OK (rivalry)	PPV	W 17–13	75,004	
November 21	2:30 p.m.	at No. 1 Nebraska	No. 2	Memorial Stadium; Lincoln, NE (rivalry)	CBS	W 17–7	76,663	
January 1, 1988	7:00 p.m.	at No. 2 Miami (FL)*	No. 1	Orange Bowl; Miami, FL (Orange Bowl)	NBC	L 14–20	74,760	
*Non-conference game; Rankings from AP Poll released prior to the game; All times are in Central time

== Rankings ==
Ranking movements Legend: ██ Increase in ranking ██ Decrease in ranking ( ) = First-place votes
	Week															
Poll	Pre	1	2	3	4	5	6	7	8	9	10	11	12	13	14	Final
AP	1 (55)	1 (54)	1 (54)	1 (53)	1 (44)	1 (46)	1 (47)	1 (42)	1 (40)	1 (38)	1 (36)	2 (20)	1 (54)	1 (48)	1 (47)	3
Coaches Poll	1	1 (44)	1 (45)	1 (45)	1 (46)	1 (45)	1 (43)	1 (45)	1 (43)	1 (43)	1 (38)	2 (27)	1 (48)	1 (41)	1 (41)	3

== Game summaries ==
=== North Carolina ===
Team	1	2	3	4	Total
Tar Heels	0	0	0	0	0
• Sooners	0	21	7	0	28

- Date: September 12
- Location: Oklahoma Memorial Stadium, Norman, Oklahoma
- Game attendance: 75,004

Scoring summary
Q2	OKLA	Holieway 3 yard run (Lashar kick)	OKLA 7–0
Q2	OKLA	Holieway 4 yard run (Lashar kick)	OKLA 14–0
Q2	OKLA	Holieway 1 yard run (Lashar kick)	OKLA 21–0
Q3	OKLA	Holieway 1 yard run (Lashar kick)	OKLA 28–0

Jamelle Holieway 25 Rush, 170 Yds

=== Texas ===
#1 Oklahoma Sooners vs. Texas Longhorns

Team	1	2	3	4	Total
• #1 Oklahoma	0	13	21	10	44
Texas	3	3	0	3	9

- Date: October 10
- Location: Cotton Bowl, Dallas
- Game start: 1:30 p.m. CDT
- Game attendance: 75,587
- Referee: Wendel Shelton
- TV announcers (CBS): Brent Musburger, Pat Haden and John Dockery

Scoring summary
1	TEX	Clements 52-yard field goal	TEX 3-0
2	OU	Carr 7-yard run (Lashar kick)	OU 7-3
2	OU	Lashar 46-yard field goal	OU 10-3
2	OU	Lashar 22-yard field goal	OU 13-3
2	TEX	Clements 46-yard field goal	OU 13-6
3	OU	Cabbiness 44-yard pass from Holieway (Lashar kick)	OU 20-6
3	OU	Carr 32-yard run (Lashar kick)	OU 27-6
3	OU	Collins 4-yard run (Lashar kick)	OU 34-6
4	TEX	Clements 36-yard field goal	OU 34-9
4	OU	Lashar 29-yard field goal	OU 37-9
4	OU	Thompson 55-yard run (Lashar kick)	OU 44-9

=== Kansas State ===
#1 Oklahoma Sooners at Kansas State Wildcats

Team	1	2	3	4	Total
• #1 Oklahoma	14	17	14	14	59
Kansas State	3	7	0	0	10

- Date: October 17
- Location: KSU Stadium, Manhattan, Kansas
- Game attendance: 27,200

Scoring summary
1	OKLA	Stafford 20-yard run (Lashar kick)	Oklahoma 7-0
1	OKLA	Cabbiness 28-yard pass from Holieway (Lashar kick)	Oklahoma 14-0
1	KSU	Porter 22-yard field goal	Oklahoma 14-3
2	OKLA	Holieway 1-yard run (Lashar kick)	Oklahoma 21-3
2	OKLA	Carr 2-yard run (Lashar kick)	Oklahoma 28-3
2	KSU	Williams 81-yard pass from Swim (Porter kick)	Oklahoma 28-10
2	OKLA	Lashar 31-yard field goal	Oklahoma 31-10
3	OKLA	Collins 20-yard run (Lashar kick)	Oklahoma 38-10
3	OKLA	Thompson 32-yard run (Lashar kick)	Oklahoma 45-10
4	OKLA	Mitchell 82-yard run (Lashar kick)	Oklahoma 52-10
4	OKLA	Anderson 1-yard run (Lashar kick)	Oklahoma 59-10

=== Colorado ===
Colorado Buffaloes at #1 Oklahoma Sooners

Team	1	2	3	4	Total
Colorado	0	6	0	0	6
• #1 Oklahoma	10	0	7	7	24

- Date: October 24
- Location: Oklahoma Memorial Stadium, Norman, Oklahoma
- Game attendance: 75,004

Scoring summary
1	OU	Stafford 23-yard run (Lashar kick)	OU 7-0
2	OU	Lashar 48-yard field goal	OU 10-0
2	COL	Hannah 20-yard field goal	OU 10-3
2	COL	Hannah 32-yard field goal	OU 10-6
3	OU	Carr 21-yard run (Lashar kick)	OU 17-6
4	OU	Collins 1-yard run (Lashar kick)	OU 24-6

=== Oklahoma State ===
#12 Oklahoma State Cowboys at #1 Oklahoma Sooners

Quarter	1	2	3	4	Total
Oklahoma St	3	0	0	7	10
Oklahoma	10	0	6	13	29

at Oklahoma Memorial Stadium • Norman, Oklahoma

- Date: November 7
- Game attendance: 75,004

Game information
- OKLA - Holieway 5 yard run (Lashar kick)
- OSU - Blanchard 38 yard field goal
- OKLA - Lashar 35 yard field goal
- OKLA - Hall 3 yard run (kick failed)
- OSU - Sanders 1 yard run (Blanchard kick)
- OKLA - Johnson 10 yard interception return (run failed)
- OKLA - Dixon 95 yard interception return (Lashar kick)

Oklahoma St

- Gundy 11/27, 115 Yds, 4 INT
- Thomas 15 Rush, 173 Yds
- Green 3 Rec, 47 Yds

Oklahoma

- Holieway 0/6, 0 Yds, INT
- Anderson 30 Rush, 191 Yds
- Holieway 18 Rush, 123 Yds, TD

=== Missouri ===
	1	2	3	4	Total
Missouri	0	3	7	3	13
Oklahoma	3	7	7	0	17

=== Nebraska ===
#2 Oklahoma Sooners (10–0) at #1 Nebraska Cornhuskers (9–0)

Quarter	1	2	3	4	Total
Oklahoma	0	0	14	3	17
Nebraska	7	0	0	0	7

at Memorial Stadium • Lincoln, Nebraska

- Date: November 21
- Game weather: Sunny
- Game attendance: 76,663
- Referee: John McClintock
- TV announcers (CBS): Brent Musburger and Pat Haden
- HuskerMax

Game information

Oklahoma

- Charles Thompson
  2/9, 25 Yds
- Patrick Collins
  13 Rush, 131 Yds, TD
- Keith Jackson
  1 Rec, 21 Yds

Nebraska

- Steve Taylorr
  6/18, 58 Yds, 3 INT
- Keith Jones
  15 Rush, 94 Yds, TD
- Richard Bell
  2 Rec, 18 Yds

"Game of the Century II"
The Bow - Patrick Collins

Scoring summary

Quarter	Time	Drive			Team	Scoring information	Score	
Quarter	Time	Plays	Yards	TOP	Team	Scoring information	OU	NEB
1	1:28		84		Nebraska	Jones 25-yard touchdown run, Drennan kick good	7	0
3	12:48	2	13		Oklahoma	Stafford 11-yard touchdown run, Lashar kick good	7	7
3	1:39				Oklahoma	Collins 65-yard touchdown run, Lashar kick good	14	7
4	7:40				Oklahoma	27-yard field goal by Lashar	17	7
"TOP" = time of possession. For other American football terms, see Glossary of American football.							17	7

== Personnel ==
1987 Oklahoma Sooners football team roster
Players
Coaches
Offense

Pos.	#	Name	Class
G	66	Brian Brauninger	Fr
WR	83	Carl Cabbiness	Jr
WR	16	Chris Cabbiness	Fr
RB	45	Lydell Carr	Sr
HB	33	Patrick Collins (C)	Sr
RB	22	Mike Gaddis	Fr
QB	4	Jamelle Holieway	Jr
G	79	Mark Hutson (C)	Sr
TE	88	Keith Jackson	Sr
G	68	Anthony Phillips	Jr
OT	77	Caesar Rentie	Sr
QB	6	Charles Thompson	RFr

Defense

Pos.	#	Name	Class
DE	43	Adrian Cooper	Fr
DB	15	Derrick Crudup	Sr
DT	77	Stacey Dillard	Fr
DB	29	Rickey Dixon	Sr
DE	78	Scott Evans	Fr
DE	80	Troy Johnson	Sr
LB	50	Dante Jones (C)	Sr
DT	90	Darren Kilpatrick	Sr
DE	40	Darrell Reed (C)	Sr
DB	22	Kevin Thompson	So
DB	10	David Vickers (C)	Sr
LB	30	Chris Wilson	Fr

Special teams

Pos.	#	Name	Class
K	13	R.D. Lashar	Fr
K	91	Todd Thomsen	Jr

Head coach

- Barry Switzer

Coordinators/assistant coaches

- Jim Donnan (OC)
- Gary Gibbs (DC)
- Merv Johnson (OL)
- Charlie Sadler (DL)
- Lucious Selmon (OLB & DE)

Legend

- (C) Team captain
- (S) Suspended
- (I) Ineligible
- Injured
- Redshirt

Roster

== Awards and honors ==
- All-American: Rickey Dixon, Mark Hutson, Keith Jackson, Danté Jones, and Darrell Reed
- Jim Thorpe Award: Dixon

== After the season ==
=== NFL draft ===
The following players were selected in the 1988 NFL draft following the season.

Round	Pick	Player	Position	NFL team
1	5	Rickey Dixon	Defensive back	Cincinnati Bengals
1	13	Keith Jackson	Tight end	Philadelphia Eagles
2	51	Dante Jones	Linebacker	Chicago Bears
3	67	Mark Hutson	Guard	Dallas Cowboys
4	99	Greg Johnson	Tackle	Miami Dolphins
4	106	Lydell Carr	Running back	New Orleans Saints
5	116	Darrell Reed	Linebacker	Green Bay Packers
5	133	Troy Johnson	Linebacker	Chicago Bears
6	148	Jon Phillips	Guard	Phoenix Cardinals
6	164	Derrick White	Defensive back	Minnesota Vikings
7	171	Derrick Crudup	Defensive back	Los Angeles Raiders
7	189	Caesar Rentie	Tackle	Chicago Bears
8	200	Patrick Collins	Running back	Green Bay Packers
