= 1986 Oklahoma Sooners football team =

American college football season

1986 Oklahoma Sooners football

Big 8 champion Orange Bowl champion

Orange Bowl, W 42–8 vs. Arkansas
- Conference: Big Eight Conference

Ranking
- Coaches: No. 3
- AP: No. 3
- Record: 11–1 (7–0 Big 8)
- Head coach: Barry Switzer (14th season)
- Offensive coordinator: Jim Donnan (2nd season)
- Offensive scheme: Wishbone
- Defensive coordinator: Gary Gibbs (6th season)
- Base defense: 5–2
- Captains: Brian Bosworth; Sonny Brown; Spencer Tillman
- Home stadium: Oklahoma Memorial Stadium

1986 Big Eight Conference football standings
	Conf.					Overall
Team	W		L		T	W		L		T
No. 3 Oklahoma $	7	–	0	–	0	11	–	1	–	0
Colorado	6	–	1	–	0	6	–	6	–	0
No. 5 Nebraska	5	–	2	–	0	10	–	2	–	0
Oklahoma State	4	–	3	–	0	6	–	5	–	0
Iowa State	3	–	4	–	0	6	–	5	–	0
Missouri	2	–	5	–	0	3	–	8	–	0
Kansas State	1	–	6	–	0	2	–	9	–	0
Kansas	0	–	7	–	0	3	–	8	–	0
$ – Conference champion; Rankings from AP Poll

The 1986 Oklahoma Sooners football team represented the University of Oklahoma in the 1986 NCAA Division I-A football season. They played their home games at Oklahoma Memorial Stadium and competed as members of the Big Eight Conference. The team recorded five shutouts and led the nation in all four major defensive categories (total, rushing, passing, and scoring).

== Schedule ==
Date	Time	Opponent	Rank	Site	TV	Result	Attendance	Source
September 6	2:30 p.m.	No. 4 UCLA*	No. 1	Oklahoma Memorial Stadium; Norman, OK	ABC	W 38–3	75,684	
September 20	1:30 p.m.	Minnesota*	No. 1	Oklahoma Memorial Stadium; Norman, OK		W 63–0	75,463	
September 27	2:30 p.m.	at No. 2 Miami (FL)*	No. 1	Miami Orange Bowl; Miami, FL	CBS	L 16–28	71,451	
October 4	1:30 p.m.	Kansas State	No. 6	Oklahoma Memorial Stadium; Norman, OK		W 56–10	74,284	
October 11	2:30 p.m.	vs. Texas*	No. 6	Cotton Bowl; Dallas, TX	ABC	W 47–12	75,587	
October 18	1:30 p.m.	Oklahoma State	No. 5	Oklahoma Memorial Stadium; Norman, OK (Bedlam Series)		W 19–0	76,022	
October 25	1:00 p.m.	at Iowa State	No. 5	Cyclone Stadium; Ames, IA		W 38–0	43,190	
November 1	2:30 p.m.	at Kansas	No. 4	Memorial Stadium; Lawrence, KS	ABC	W 64–3	38,500	
November 8	1:00 p.m.	Missouri	No. 4	Oklahoma Memorial Stadium; Norman, OK (rivalry)		W 77–0	75,480	
November 15	12:00 p.m.	Colorado	No. 4	Folsom Field; Boulder, CO	Raycom	W 28–0	52,707	
November 22	2:30 p.m.	at No. 5 Nebraska	No. 3	Memorial Stadium; Lincoln, NE (rivalry)	ABC	W 20–17	76,198	
January 1, 1987	7:30 p.m.	vs. No. 9 Arkansas*	No. 3	Miami Orange Bowl; Miami, FL (Orange Bowl)	NBC	W 42–8	52,717	
*Non-conference game; Rankings from AP Poll released prior to the game; All times are in Central time

== Roster ==
1986 Oklahoma Sooners football team roster
Players
Coaches
Offense

Pos.	#	Name	Class
C	57	Kevin Adkins	Sr
FB	28	Rotnei Anderson	So
C	74	W. Bennett	So
G	95	Jodie Britt	Jr
DE	38	Johnny Judkins	Sr
SE	36	Eric Bross	Fr
SE	83	Carl Cabbiness	So
RB	45	Lydell Carr	Jr
OT	63	Nigel Clay	Fr
RB	33	Patrick Collins	Jr
HB	32	Phillips Collins	Fr
OT	73	Robert Conner	Fr
HB	32	Ron Counter	Jr
OL		Jerry Crafts	Fr
OT	72	Dungan Forrest	So
OT	58	Mickey Greene	So
SE	26	Artie Guess	Fr
HB	37	Fred Gunter	Fr
QB	6	Bernard Hall	Fr
QB	4	Jamelle Holieway	So
OT	79	Mark Hutson	Jr
TE	88	Keith Jackson (C)	Jr
LS	73	Chuck Johnson	So
FB	5	Earl Johnson	Sr
OT	75	Greg Johnson	Jr
OT	92	Harold Jones	Fr
TE	87	Aubrey King	So
C	56	Bob Latham	So
G	62	Al Laurita	Jr
HB	23	Don Maloney	So
OT	64	Terron Manning	Fr
OT	70	Richard Marks	Jr
OL	67	Larry Medice	Fr
QB	1	Eric Mitchel	So
WR	84	Lee Morris	Jr
RB	34	Jarrod Oliver	Fr
TE	82	Duncan Parham	So
FB	2	Leon Perry	So
G	68	Anthony Phillips	So
OT	66	Jon Phillips	Jr
TE	97	Lance Price	So
TE	89	Terry Pritchard	Fr
OT	77	Caesar Rentie	Jr
RB	3	Derrick Shepard	Sr
C	53	Travis Simpson	Sr
HB	24	Don Smitherman	So
HB	25	Anthony Stafford	So
HB	27	Damon Stell	Jr
QB	11	Glenn Sullivan	Jr
SE	13	Leonard Thomas	Fr
QB	16	Charles Thompson	Fr
RB	20	Spencer Tillman (C)	Sr
OL	76	Mark Van Keirsblick	Fr
HB	13	Dion Wharry	Fr
OL		Andre Williams	Fr
C	59	Greg Williams	Fr
C	65	Mike Wise	Fr
FB	30	Chris Yourman	Fr

Defense

Pos.	#	Name	Class
DE	61	Mike Aljoe	Sr
LB	85	Tom Backes	Fr
LB	44	Brian Bosworth (C)	Jr
DB	8	Sonny Brown	Sr
DT	86	Steve Bryan	Sr
LB	36	Adrian Cooper	Fr
DB	15	Derrick Crudup	Jr
NG	51	Richard Davis	So
LB	38	Wayne Dickson	Fr
LB	41	Richard Dillon	So
DE	69	Greg Dixon	Fr
DB	29	Rickey Dixon	Jr
LB	36	Robert Eck	So
LB	55	Scott Evans
DB	9	Lonnie Finch	So
DB	49	Scott Garl	So
LB	54	Evan Gatewood	Sr
DB	7	Ledell Glenn	Sr
DE	39	James Goode	Fr
LB	52	Tracy Gordon	Fr
DE	47	Jeff Hake	Sr
DB	6	Andre Johnson	Sr
DE	80	Troy Johnson	Jr
LB	50	Dante Jones	Jr
DE	38	John Judkins	Sr
DE	46	Kert Kaspar	So
DT	90	Darren Kilpatrick	Jr
DL	78	Darrell Kirby	Fr
DE	60	Mike Mantle	Sr
LB	48	Brad McBride	Jr
DB	17	Ken McMichel	Fr
LB	42	Paul Migliazzo	Sr
DE	94	Zarak Peters	Fr
DB	35	Tony Rayburn	Sr
DE	40	Darrell Reed	Jr
DT	96	Richard Reed	Sr
DB	21	Carlos Scott	Fr
DT	81	David Shoemaker	Fr
DB	22	Kevin Thompson	Fr
DB	19	Scott Thompson	Fr
DB	10	David Vickers	Jr
DB	14	Derrick White	Jr
NG	93	Curtice Williams	So
DL	98	Dante Williams	Fr
DT	99	Tony Woods	So

Special teams

Pos.	#	Name	Class
P	26	Darren Atyia	Jr
K	31	Tim Lashar	Sr
K	91	Todd Thomsen	So
K		Roy White	Fr
P	12	Mike Winchester	Sr

Head coach

- Barry Switzer

Coordinators/assistant coaches

- Jim Donnan (OC)
- Gary Gibbs (DC)
- Merv Johnson (OL)
- Charlie Sadler (DL)
- Lucious Selmon (OLB & DE)

Legend

- (C) Team captain
- (S) Suspended
- (I) Ineligible
- Injured
- Redshirt

Roster

== Game summaries ==
=== UCLA ===
Team	1	2	3	4	Total
UCLA	0	3	0	0	3
• Oklahoma	3	14	14	7	38

- Date: September 6
- Location: Oklahoma Memorial Stadium

=== Minnesota ===
Team	1	2	3	4	Total
Minnesota	0	0	0	0	0
• Oklahoma	14	21	14	14	63

- Date: September 20
- Location: Oklahoma Memorial Stadium

=== Miami (FL) ===
Team	1	2	3	4	Total
Oklahoma	0	3	7	6	16
• Miami (FL)	0	7	21	0	28

- Date: September 27
- Location: Orange Bowl

=== Kansas State ===
Kansas State Wildcats (1–3) at Oklahoma Sooners (2–1)

Quarter	1	2	3	4	Total
Kansas State	0	10	0	0	10
Oklahoma	21	7	7	21	56

at Oklahoma Memorial Stadium • Norman, Oklahoma

- Date: October 4
- Game attendance: 74,284

Game information

Kansas State

- Randy Williams
  13/21, 97 Yds, INT
- Todd Moody
  19 Rush, 57 Yds
- Todd Elder
  6 Rec, 60 Yds

Oklahoma

- Eric Mitchel
  1/6, 58 Yds, TD
  12 Rush, 126 Yds, 2 TD
- Carl Cabbiness
  1 Rec, 58 Yds, TD

Scoring summary

Quarter	Time	Drive			Team	Scoring information	Score	
Quarter	Time	Plays	Yards	TOP	Team	Scoring information	KSU	OKLA
1					Oklahoma	Lydell Carr 1-yard touchdown run, Tim Lashar kick good	0	7
1					Oklahoma	Eric Mitchel 56-yard touchdown run, Tim Lashar kick good	0	14
1					Oklahoma	Spencer Tillman 5-yard touchdown run, Tim Lashar kick good	0	21
2					Oklahoma	Eric Mitchel 3-yard touchdown run, Tim Lashar kick good	0	28
2					Kansas State	Blocked punt returned 19 yards for touchdown by Grady Newton, Mark Porter kick good	7	28
2					Kansas State	32-yard field goal by Mark Porter	10	28
3					Oklahoma	Carl Cabbiness 58-yard touchdown reception from Eric Mitchel, Tim Lashar kick good	10	35
4					Oklahoma	Glenn Sullivan 1-yard touchdown run, Tim Lashar kick good	10	42
4					Oklahoma	Glenn Sullivan 12-yard touchdown run, Tim Lashar kick good	10	49
4					Oklahoma	Rotnei Anderson 6-yard touchdown run, Tim Lashar kick good	10	56
"TOP" = time of possession. For other American football terms, see Glossary of American football.							10	56

=== Texas ===
Texas Longhorns vs. #6 Oklahoma Sooners

Team	1	2	3	4	Total
Texas	0	0	6	6	12
• #6 Oklahoma	17	14	7	9	47

- Date: October 11
- Location: Cotton Bowl, Dallas
- Game attendance: 75,587

Scoring summary
1	OU	Collins 9-yard run (Lashar kick)	OU 7-0
1	OU	Collins 14-yard run (Lashar kick)	OU 14-0
1	OU	Lashar 28-yard field goal	OU 17-0
2	OU	Holieway 21-yard run (Lashar kick)	OU 24-0
2	OU	Jackson 56-yard pass from Mitchel (Lashar kick)	OU 31-0
3	OU	Tillman 6-yard run (Lashar kick)	OU 38-0
3	TEX	Gay 33-yard pass from Stafford (pass failed)	OU 38-6
4	OU	Collins 23-yard run (Lashar kick)	OU 45-6
4	TEX	Metcalf 29-yard pass from Stafford (pass failed)	OU 45-12
4	OU	Safety, Metcalf tackled by Ledett in end zone	OU 47-12

=== Oklahoma State ===
Team	1	2	3	4	Total
Oklahoma St	0	0	0	0	0
• Oklahoma	3	3	3	10	19

- Date: October 18
- Location: Oklahoma Memorial Stadium

=== Iowa State ===
Team	1	2	3	4	Total
• Oklahoma	7	10	7	14	38
Iowa St	0	0	0	0	0

- Date: October 25
- Location: Cyclone Stadium

=== Kansas ===
Team	1	2	3	4	Total
• Oklahoma	17	3	37	7	64
Kansas	0	0	0	3	3

- Date: November 1
- Location: Memorial Stadium

=== Missouri ===
Team	1	2	3	4	Total
Missouri	0	0	0	0	0
• Oklahoma	21	28	7	21	77

- Date: November 8
- Location: Oklahoma Memorial Stadium

=== Colorado ===
#4 Oklahoma Sooners at Colorado Buffaloes

Team	1	2	3	4	Total
• #4 Oklahoma	7	7	0	14	28
Colorado	0	0	0	0	0

- Date: November 15
- Location: Folsom Field, Boulder, Colorado
- Game attendance: 52,702

Scoring summary
1	OU	Collins 17-yard run (Lashar kick)	OU 7-0
2	OU	Carr 2-yard run (Lashar kick)	OU 14-0
4	OU	Jackson recovered fumble in end zone (Lashar kick)	OU 21-0
4	OU	Collins 8-yard run (Lashar kick)	OU 28-0

=== Nebraska ===
Team	1	2	3	4	Total
• #3 Oklahoma	7	0	0	13	20
#5 Nebraska	7	3	7	0	17

- Date: November 22
- Location: Memorial Stadium

=== Vs. Arkansas (Orange Bowl) ===
#9 Arkansas vs. #3 Oklahoma

Team	1	2	3	4	Total
Arkansas	0	0	0	8	8
• Oklahoma	0	14	14	14	42

- Date: January 1
- Location: Orange Bowl
- Game attendance: 52,717
- Television network: NBC

Scoring summary
2	OU	Tillman 77-yard run (Lashar kick)	OU 7-0
2	OU	Tillman 21-yard run (Lashar kick)	OU 14-0
3	OU	Holieway 2-yard run (Lashar kick)	OU 21-0
3	OU	Holieway 4-yard run (Lashar kick)	OU 28-0
4	OU	Stafford 13-yard run (Lashar kick)	OU 35-0
4	OU	Parham 49-yard run (Lashar kick)	OU 42-0
4	ARK	D. Thomas 1-yard run (Bland to Shibest pass)	OU 42-8

== Rankings ==
Ranking movements Legend: ██ Increase in ranking ██ Decrease in ranking ( ) = First-place votes
	Week														
Poll	Pre	1	2	3	4	5	6	7	8	9	10	11	12	13	Final
AP	1 (44)	1 (55)	1 (55)	1 (55)	6	6	5	5	4	4	4	3	3	3	3 (3)
Coaches Poll	1 (36)	1 (44)	1 (43)	1 (44)	6	6	6	6	4	4	4	3	3	3	3

== Postseason ==
=== NFL draft ===
The following players were selected in the National Football League draft following the season.

Sooners who were picked in the 1987 NFL Draft:

Round	Pick	Player	Position	NFL team
5	120	Steve Bryan	Defensive end	Chicago Bears
5	133	Spencer Tillman	Running back	Houston Oilers
8	221	Paul Migliazzo	Linebacker	Chicago Bears

== Awards and honors ==
- Brian Bosworth, Butkus Award
