= 1986 All-Big Eight Conference football team =

American all-star college football team

The 1986 All-Big Eight Conference football team consists of American football players chosen by various organizations for All-Big Eight Conference teams for the 1986 NCAA Division I-A football season. The selectors for the 1986 season included the Associated Press (AP) and the United Press International (UPI).

== Offensive selections ==
=== Quarterbacks ===
- Jamelle Holieway, Oklahoma (AP-1, UPI-1)
- Alex Espinoza, Iowa State (AP-2, UPI-2)

=== Running backs ===
- Keith Jones, Nebraska (AP-1, UPI-1)
- Thurman Thomas, Oklahoma State (AP-1, UPI-1)
- Lydell Carr, Oklahoma (AP-2, UPI-2)
- Darrell Wallace, Missouri (AP-2)
- Tony Jordan, Kansas State (UPI-2)

=== Tight ends ===
- Keith Jackson, Oklahoma (AP-1, UPI-1)
- Jon Embree, Colorado (AP-2)
- Todd Millikan, Nebraska (UPI-2)

=== Wide receivers ===
- Hart Lee Dykes, Oklahoma State (AP-1, UPI-1)
- Willie Vaughn, Kansas (AP-1, UPI-1)
- Robbie Minor, Iowa State (AP-2, UPI-2)
- Ronnie Caldwell, Kansas (AP-2)
- Rod Smith, Nebraska (UPI-2)

=== Centers ===
- Eric Coyle, Colorado (AP-1, UPI-1)
- Travis Simpson, Oklahoma (AP-2)
- Channon Mawdsley, Iowa State (UPI-2)

=== Offensive tackles ===
- Tom Welter, Nebraska (AP-1, UPI-1)
- John Clay, Missouri (AP-1, UPI-1)
- Greg Johnson, Oklahoma (AP-2, UPI-2)
- John McCormick, Nebraska (AP-2, UPI-2)
- Brett Lawrence, Iowa State (UPI-2)

=== Offensive guards ===
- Anthony Phillips, Oklahoma (AP-1, UPI-1)
- Mark Hutson, Oklahoma (AP-1, UPI-1)
- Stan Parker, Nebraska (AP-2)
- Rob Maggard, Nebraska (AP-2)
- Phil Petty, Missouri (UPI-2)

== Defensive selections ==
=== Defensive ends ===
- Broderick Thomas, Nebraska (AP-1, UPI-1)
- Darrell Reed, Oklahoma (AP-1, UPI-1)
- Troy Johnson, Oklahoma (AP-2, UPI-2)
- Jerry Deckard, Oklahoma State (AP-2)
- Phil Forte, Kansas (UPI-2)

=== Middle guard ===
- Danny Noonan, Nebraska (AP-1, UPI-1)
- Kyle Rappold, Colorado (UPI-2)

=== Defensive tackles ===
- Curt Koch, Colorado (AP-1, UPI-1)
- Chris Spachman, Nebraska (AP-1, UPI-2)
- Steve Bryan, Oklahoma (AP-2, UPI-1)
- Greg Liter, Iowa State (AP-2, UPI-2)
- Dick Chapura, Missouri (AP-2, UPI-2)

=== Linebackers ===
- Brian Bosworth, Oklahoma (AP-1, UPI-1)
- Barry Remington, Colorado (AP-1, UPI-1)
- Marc Munford, Nebraska (AP-1, UPI-2)
- Darin Schubeck, Colorado (AP-2)
- Paul Migliazzo, Oklahoma (AP-2)
- Dennis Gibson, Iowa State (UPI-2)

=== Defensive backs ===
- Mark Moore, Oklahoma State (AP-1, UPI-1)
- Mickey Pruitt, Colorado (AP-1, UPI-1)
- David Vickers, Oklahoma (AP-1, UPI-1)
- Rickey Dixon, Oklahoma (AP-2, UPI-1)
- Wayne Ziegler, Kansas (AP-2, UPI-2)
- Mike Hudson, Oklahoma State (AP-2)
- Sonny Brown, Oklahoma (AP-2, UPI-2)
- Brian Davis, Nebraska (UPI-2)
- Terrence Anthony, Iowa State (UPI-2)

== Special teams ==
=== Place-kicker ===
- Tim Lashar, Oklahoma (AP-1, UPI-1)
- Tom Whelihan, Missouri (AP-2, UPI-2)

=== Punter ===
- Barry Helton, Colorado (AP-1, UPI-1)
- Rick Frank, Iowa State (AP-2, UPI-2)

== Key ==
AP = Associated Press

UPI = United Press International

Bold = Consensus first-team selection of both the Associated Press and UPI

== See also ==
- 1986 College Football All-America Team
