= 1987 All-America college football team =

Official list of the best college football players of 1987

The 1987 All-America college football team is composed of college football players who were selected as All-Americans by various organizations and writers that chose College Football All-America Teams in 1987. The National Collegiate Athletic Association (NCAA) recognizes five selectors as "official" for the 1987 season. They are: (1) the American Football Coaches Association (AFCA); (2) the Associated Press (AP) selected based on the votes of sports writers at AP newspapers; (3) the Football Writers Association of America (FWAA); (4) the United Press International (UPI) selected based on the votes of sports writers at UPI newspapers; and (5) the Walter Camp Football Foundation (WC). Other notable selectors included Football News the Newspaper Enterprise Association (NEA), Scripps Howard (SH), and The Sporting News (TSN).

== Consensus All-Americans ==
The following charts identify the NCAA-recognized consensus All-Americans for the year 1987 and displays which first-team designations they received.

=== Offense ===
Name	Position	School	Number	Official	Other
Tim Brown	Wide receiver/return specialist	Notre Dame	5/4/9	AFCA, AP, FWAA, UPI, WC	FN, NEA, SH, TSN
Mark Hutson	Offensive guard	Oklahoma	5/3/8	AFCA, AP, FWAA, UPI, WC	FN, NEA, SH
Don McPherson	Quarterback	Syracuse	5/3/8	AFCA, AP, FWAA, UPI, WC	NEA, SH, TSN
Keith Jackson	Tight end	Oklahoma	5/2/7	AFCA, AP, FWAA, UPI, WC	FN, SH
Nacho Albergamo	Center	LSU	5/2/7	AFCA, AP, FWAA, UPI, WC	SH, TSN
Dave Cadigan	Offensive tackle	USC	4/3/7	AP, FWAA, UPI, WC	NEA, SH, TSN
Lorenzo White	Running back	Michigan State	4/3/7	AFCA, FWAA, UPI, WC	FN, NEA, SH
Wendell Davis	Wide receiver	LSU	3/3/6	AFCA, FWAA, UPI	FN, SH, TSN
Randall McDaniel	Offensive guard	Arizona State	4/1/5	AFCA, FWAA, UPI, WC	SH
Craig Heyward	Running back	Pittsburgh	3/2/5	AP, FWAA, UPI	SH, TSN
Jumbo Elliott	Offensive tackle	Michigan	4/0/4	AFCA, FWAA, UPI, WC	--

=== Defense ===
Name	Position	School	Number	Official	Other
Bennie Blades	Defensive back	Miami	5/4/9	AFCA, AP, FWAA, UPI, WC	FN, NEA, SH, TSN
Chad Hennings	Defensive line	Air Force	5/4/9	AFCA, AP, FWAA, UPI, WC	FN, NEA, SH, TSN
Deion Sanders	Defensive back	Florida State	5/4/9	AFCA, AP, FWAA, UPI, WC	FN, NEA, SH, TSN
Chris Spielman	Linebacker	Ohio State	5/4/9	AFCA, AP, FWAA, UPI, WC	FN, NEA, SH, TSN
Danny Stubbs	Defensive line	Miami	5/4/9	AFCA, AP, FWAA, UPI, WC	FN, NEA, SH, TSN
Aundray Bruce	Linebacker	Auburn	3/2/5	AFCA, UPI, WC	SH, TSN
Tracy Rocker	Defensive line	Auburn	3/2/5	FWAA, UPI, WC	FN, SH
Ted Gregory	Defensive line	Syracuse	2/3/5	FWAA, UPI	FN, NEA, TSN
Chuck Cecil	Defensive back	Arizona	3/1/4	AFCA, UPI, WC	FN
Rickey Dixon	Defensive back	Oklahoma	3/1/4	AP, FWAA, UPI	SH
Dante Jones	Linebacker	Oklahoma	2/1/3	AFCA, AP	SH
John Roper	Linebacker	Texas A&M	2/0/2	AP, FWAA	--

=== Special teams ===
Name	Position	School	Number	Official	Other
David Treadwell	Placekicker	Clemson	4/4/8	AFCA, AP, UPI, WC	FN, NEA, SH, TSN
Tom Tupa	Punter	Ohio State	5/2/7	AFCA, AP, FWAA, UPI, WC	NEA, SH

== Full selections - offense ==
=== Quarterbacks ===
- Don McPherson, Syracuse (CFHOF) (AFCA, AP-1, FWAA, UPI-1, WC, NEA-1, SH, TSN)
- Troy Aikman, UCLA (CFHOF) (AP-2, UPI-2, NEA-2)
- Steve Taylor, Nebraska (AP-3, FN)

=== Running backs ===
- Lorenzo White, Michigan State (AFCA, AP-2, FWAA, UPI-1, WC, FN, NEA-1, SH)
- Craig Heyward, Pittsburgh (AP-1, FWAA, UPI-1, SH, TSN)
- Gaston Green, UCLA (AFCA, UPI-2, WC, FN, NEA-1)
- Bobby Humphrey, Alabama (AP-3, WC, NEA-2, TSN)
- Thurman Thomas, Oklahoma State (CFHOF) (AP-1, UPI-2)
- Lydell Carr, Oklahoma (NEA-1 [FB])
- Eric Metcalf, Texas (AP-2)
- Jamie Morris, Michigan (NEA-2)
- Mel Bratton, Miami (FL) (NEA-2 [FB])
- Blair Thomas, Penn State (AP-3)

=== Wide receivers ===
- Tim Brown, Notre Dame (CFHOF) (AFCA, AP-1 [return specialist], FWAA [KR/WR], UPI-1, WC, FN, NEA-1, SH, TSN)
- Wendell Davis, LSU (AFCA, AP-2, FWAA, UPI-1, FN, SH, TSN)
- Sterling Sharpe, South Carolina (CFHOF) (AP-3, FWAA, UPI-2, TSN)
- Ernie Jones, Indiana (AP-1)
- Marc Zeno, Tulane (AP-1, UPI-2)
- Guy Liggins, San Jose State (AP-2)
- Michael Irvin, Miami (FL) (NEA-2)
- Terance Mathis, New Mexico (AP-3)

=== Tight ends ===
- Keith Jackson, Oklahoma (CFHOF) (AFCA, AP-1, FWAA, UPI-1, WC, FN, NEA-2, SH)
- Pat Carter, Florida State (AP-2, UPI-2, NEA-1, TSN)
- Ferrell Edmunds, Maryland (AP-3)

=== Centers ===
- Nacho Albergamo, LSU (AFCA, AP-1, FWAA, UPI-1, WC, SH, TSN)
- Chuck Lanza, Notre Dame (AP-2, UPI-2, FN, NEA-1)
- Jake Young, Nebraska (NEA-2)
- Matt Wilson, Texas A&M (AP-3)

=== Offensive guards ===
- Mark Hutson, Oklahoma (AFCA, AP-1, FWAA, UPI-1, WC, FN, NEA-1, SH)
- Randall McDaniel, Arizona State (CFHOF) (AFCA, AP-2, FWAA, UPI-1, WC, SH)
- John Phillips, Clemson (AP-2, NEA-1)
- Steve Wisniewski, Penn State (TSN)
- Harry Galbreath, Tennessee (AP-3, UPI-2, NEA-2, TSN)
- Larry Rose, Alabama (NEA-2)
- Eric Andolsek, LSU (AP-3)

=== Offensive tackles ===
- Dave Cadigan, USC (AP-1, FWAA, UPI-1, WC, NEA-1, SH, TSN)
- Jumbo Elliot, Michigan (AFCA, FWAA, UPI-1, WC)
- John McCormick, Nebraska (AFCA, AP-1 [OG], UPI-2 [OG], FN)
- Paul Gruber, Wisconsin (UPI-2, NEA-1, TSN)
- Stacy Searels, Auburn (AP-1, FN)
- Dave Richards, UCLA (SH)
- Greg Johnson, Oklahoma (AP-2, UPI-2, NEA-2)
- Tony Mandarich, Michigan State (AP-2, FN)
- Louis Cheek, Texas A&M (AP-3)
- Pat Tomberlin, Florida State (AP-3, NEA-2)

== Full selections - defense ==
=== Defensive linemen ===
- Chad Hennings, Air Force (CFHOF) (AFCA, AP-1 [DT], FWAA, UPI-1, WC, FN, NEA-1 [DT], SH, TSN)
- Danny Stubbs, Miami (AFCA, AP-1 [DT], FWAA, UPI-1, WC, FN, NEA-1 [DE], SH, TSN)
- Tracy Rocker, Auburn (CFHOF) (AP-3 [DT], FWAA, UPI-1, WC, FN, SH)
- Ted Gregory, Syracuse (UPI-1, FWAA, FN, NEA-1 [NG], TSN)
- Neil Smith, Nebraska (AP-2 [DT], NEA-1 [DT], TSN)
- Tony Cherico, Arkansas (AFCA, UPI-2, SH)
- Broderick Thomas, Nebraska (AP-2, UPI-2, WC, NEA-1 [DE])
- Michael Dean Perry, Clemson (FWAA, UPI-2, NEA-2 [DT])
- Darrell Reed, Oklahoma (AP-1 [DE], UPI-2, FN, NEA-2 [DE])
- Mark Messner, Michigan (AP-2 [DT], TSN)
- Roy Hart, South Carolina (AP-2 [NG])
- Burt Grossman, Pittsburgh (NEA-2 [DE])
- Carlton Bailey, North Carolina (NEA-2 [NG])
- Kyle Rappold, Colorado (AP-3 [NG])

=== Linebackers ===
- Chris Spielman, Ohio State (CFHOF) (AFCA, AP-1, FWAA, UPI-1, WC, FN, NEA-1, SH, TSN)
- Aundray Bruce, Auburn (AFCA [DL], UPI-1, WC, NEA-2, SH, TSN)
- Dante Jones, Oklahoma (AFCA, AP-1, UPI-2, SH)
- John Roper, Texas A&M (AP-1 [DE], FWAA, UPI-2)
- Ken Norton Jr. UCLA (AP-3, UPI-1, WC, FN, TSN)
- Paul McGowan, Florida State (AP-1, FN, NEA-1)
- Kurt Crain, Auburn (AP-1)
- Marcus Cotton, USC (NEA-1)
- Chris Gaines, Vanderbilt (AFCA, AP-2)
- Clifford Charlton, Florida (TSN)
- Ezekial Gadson, Pittsburgh (FWAA)
- Carnell Lake, UCLA (AP-2)
- Ned Bolcar, Notre Dame (AP-2, NEA-2)
- Van Waiters, Indiana (AP-3, UPI-2)
- Bill Romanowski, Boston College (AP-2)
- Jethro Franklin, Fresno State (AP-3)
- John Brantley, Georgia (NEA-2)
- Pete Curkendall, Penn State (AP-3 [DT])
- George Mira Jr., Miami (FL) (AP-3)
- Galand Thaxton, Wyoming (AP-3)

=== Defensive backs ===
- Bennie Blades, Miami (CFHOF) (AFCA, AP-1, FWAA, UPI-1, WC, FN, NEA-1, SH, TSN)
- Deion Sanders, Florida State (CFHOF) (AFCA, AP-1, FWAA, UPI-1, WC, FN, NEA-1, SH, TSN)
- Rickey Dixon, Oklahoma (AP-1, FWAA, UPI-1, SH)
- Chuck Cecil, Arizona (AFCA, AP-2, UPI-1, WC, FN)
- Donnell Woolford, Clemson (AFCA)
- Todd Krumm, Michigan State (UPI-2, SH)
- Jarvis Williams, Florida (WC)
- Gordon Lockbaum, Holy Cross (NEA-1)
- Louis Oliver, Florida (AP-3, UPI-2, TSN)
- Mickey Pruitt, Colorado (AP-2, TSN)
- Brad Edwards, South Carolina (AP-3, UPI-2)
- David Vickers, Oklahoma (AP-2)
- Riccardo Ingram, Georgia Tech (UPI-2, NEA-2)
- Terry McDaniel, Tennessee (NEA-2)
- Gary Richard, Pittsburgh (NEA-2)
- Kip Corrington, Texas A&M (AP-3)

== Full selections - special teams ==
=== Placekickers ===
- David Treadwell, Clemson (AFCA, AP-1, UPI-1, WC, FN, NEA-1, SH, TSN)
- Marty Zendejas, Nevada-Reno (FWAA)
- Gary Gussman, Miami (OH) (AP-2)
- Derek Schmidt, Florida State (AP-3, UPI-2, NEA-2)

=== Punters ===
- Tom Tupa, Ohio State (AFCA, AP-1, FWAA, UPI-1, WC, NEA-1, SH)
- Scott Tabor, California (AP-3, NEA-2, TSN)
- Barry Helton, Colorado (AP-2)
- Greg Montgomery, Michigan State (UPI-2, FN)

=== Returners ===
- Tim Brown, Notre Dame (CFHOF) (AP-1, FWAA [KR/WR])
- Barry Sanders, Oklahoma State (AP-2, TSN)
- Alan Grant, Stanford (AP-3)

== Key ==
- **Bold** – Consensus All-American
- -1 – First-team selection
- -2 – Second-team selection
- -3 – Third-team selection
- CFHOF = College Football Hall of Fame inductee

=== Official selectors ===
- AFCA – American Football Coaches Association (AFCA), selected by the members of the AFCA for the Kodak All-America team
- AP – Associated Press
- FWAA – Football Writers Association of America
- UPI – United Press International
- WC – Walter Camp Football Foundation, selected by the nation's college coaches and sports information directors

=== Other selectors ===
- FN – Football News
- NEA – Newspaper Enterprise Association, the NEA/World Almanac team, "chosen by a sports panel representing the World Almanac, its 140 co-sponsoring newspapers and its publisher"
- TSN – The Sporting News
- SH – Scripps Howard

== See also ==
- 1987 All-Atlantic Coast Conference football team
- 1987 All-Big Eight Conference football team
- 1987 All-Big Ten Conference football team
- 1987 All-Pacific-10 Conference football team
- 1987 All-SEC football team
