= 1987 Miami Hurricanes football team =

American college football season

1987 Miami Hurricanes football

Consensus national champion Orange Bowl champion

Orange Bowl, W 20–14 vs. Oklahoma
- Conference: Independent

Ranking
- Coaches: No. 1
- AP: No. 1
- Record: 12–0
- Head coach: Jimmy Johnson (4th season)
- Offensive coordinator: Gary Stevens (5th season)
- Offensive scheme: Pro-style
- Defensive coordinator: Dave Wannstedt (2nd season)
- Base defense: 4–3
- MVP: Steve Walsh
- Home stadium: Miami Orange Bowl

1987 NCAA Division I-A independents football records
	Conf.					Overall
Team	W		L		T	W		L		T
No. 1 Miami (FL)		–		–		12	–	0	–	0
No. 4 Syracuse		–		–		11	–	0	–	1
No. 2 Florida State		–		–		11	–	1	–	0
No. 15 South Carolina		–		–		8	–	4	–	0
Pittsburgh		–		–		8	–	4	–	0
Penn State		–		–		8	–	4	–	0
No. 17 Notre Dame		–		–		8	–	4	–	0
Southern Miss		–		–		6	–	5	–	0
Rutgers		–		–		6	–	5	–	0
Southwestern Louisiana		–		–		6	–	5	–	0
Memphis State		–		–		5	–	5	–	1
Northern Illinois		–		–		5	–	5	–	1
West Virginia		–		–		6	–	6	–	0
Tulane		–		–		6	–	6	–	0
Army		–		–		5	–	6	–	0
Boston College		–		–		5	–	6	–	0
East Carolina		–		–		5	–	6	–	0
Akron		–		–		4	–	7	–	0
Cincinnati		–		–		4	–	7	–	0
Louisville		–		–		3	–	7	–	1
Temple		–		–		3	–	8	–	0
Tulsa		–		–		3	–	8	–	0
Virginia Tech		–		–		2	–	9	–	0
Navy		–		–		2	–	9	–	0
Rankings from AP Poll

The 1987 Miami Hurricanes football team represented the University of Miami as an independent during the 1987 NCAA Division I-A football season. It was the program's 62nd season of competition. Led by fourth-year head coach Jimmy Johnson, the Hurricanes compiled a perfect record of 12–0 overall with a victory in the Orange Bowl over Oklahoma, to win the program's second national championship. The team played home games at the Miami Orange Bowl in Miami.

== Schedule ==
Date	Time	Opponent	Rank	Site	TV	Result	Attendance	Source
September 5	1:00 pm	No. 20 Florida	No. 10	Miami Orange Bowl; Miami, FL (rivalry)	TBS	W 31–4	77,224	
September 26	4:00 pm	at No. 10 Arkansas	No. 5	War Memorial Stadium; Little Rock, AR	ESPN	W 51–7	55,310	
October 3	2:30 pm	at No. 4 Florida State	No. 3	Doak Campbell Stadium; Tallahassee, FL (rivalry)	CBS	W 26–25	62,561	
October 10	7:30 pm	Maryland	No. 3	Miami Orange Bowl; Miami, FL		W 46–16	43,020	
October 24	8:00 pm	at Cincinnati	No. 3	Riverfront Stadium; Cincinnati, OH	WPLG	W 48–10	20,011	
October 31	12:00 pm	at East Carolina	No. 3	Ficklen Memorial Stadium; Greenville, NC	Raycom	W 41–3	31,791	
November 7	7:30 pm	Miami (OH)	No. 3	Miami Orange Bowl; Miami, FL		W 54–3	40,128	
November 14	7:30 pm	Virginia Tech^{†}	No. 3	Miami Orange Bowl; Miami, FL (rivalry)		W 27–13	40,105	
November 21	7:30 pm	Toledo	No. 3	Miami Orange Bowl; Miami, FL		W 24–14	37,010	
November 28	3:30 pm	No. 10 Notre Dame	No. 2	Miami Orange Bowl; Miami, FL (rivalry)	CBS	W 24–0	76,640	
December 5	8:00 pm	No. 8 South Carolina	No. 2	Miami Orange Bowl; Miami, FL	ESPN	W 20–16	63,318	
January 1	8:00 pm	No. 1 Oklahoma	No. 2	Miami Orange Bowl; Miami, FL (Orange Bowl)	NBC	W 20–14	74,760	
^{†}Homecoming; Rankings from AP Poll released prior to the game; All times are in Eastern time

== Rankings ==
Ranking movements Legend: ██ Increase in ranking ██ Decrease in ranking ( ) = First-place votes
	Week															
Poll	Pre	1	2	3	4	5	6	7	8	9	10	11	12	13	14	Final
AP	10	7	6	5	3 (4)	3 (6)	3 (6)	3 (6)	3 (7)	3 (7)	3 (9)	3 (8)	2 (4)	2 (6)	2 (9)	1 (57)
Coaches	9	7	6	7 (1)	3 (1)	3 (4)	3 (5)	3 (2)	3 (1)	3 (1)	3 (1)	3 (1)	2 (2)	2 (5)	2 (8)	1 (47)

== Preseason ==
After taking over as head coach in 1984, Jimmy Johnson had a winning record, but some critics questioned whether he could gain a national championship.

In 1985, Miami finished the regular season 10–1, and had a chance to win the national title with Penn State's loss to Oklahoma in the Orange Bowl. Needing a victory over Tennessee in the Sugar Bowl, Miami jumped out to a 7–0 lead. Tennessee then scored 35 unanswered to derail Miami's title hopes.

In 1986, Miami achieved a perfect 11–0 regular season record. Led by Heisman Trophy-winner Vinny Testaverde, a record breaking offense, and the 5th-ranked defense in the country, #1 Miami was a prohibitive favorite heading into its Fiesta Bowl matchup against #2 Penn State. However, Penn State was able to disrupt the Miami passing game and force the Hurricanes into seven turnovers. Penn State won the national championship with a 14–10 victory over Miami that was sealed when a Testaverde pass from the Penn State 6-yard line was intercepted in the endzone by linebacker Pete Giftopoulos with 0:18 left in the game.

Despite losing three key players (Testaverde, Alonzo Highsmith, and Jerome Brown) from the '86 squad who were selected within the first nine picks of the 1987 NFL draft, 1987 was expected to be somewhat of a reloading year for Miami, which began the season ranked 10th in the nation by the AP poll.

By year's end, the Hurricanes had allowed a mere 125 points. Miami took down six ranked opponents that fall – including No. 20 Florida, No. 4 FSU, No. 10 Notre Dame and No. 1 Oklahoma. The Canes earned victories by an average of 23.9 points, scoring over 40 points on five different games.

== Game summaries ==
=== No. 20 Florida ===
Under the direction of sophomore quarterback Steve Walsh and a defense that returned nine starters, Miami opened the regular season with a win over rival Florida, 31–4. The game would prove to be the last in a series that had been played annually since 1944. The teams would not meet in the regular season again until the 2002 season.

=== At No. 10 Arkansas ===
Team	1	2	3	4	Total
• No. 5 Hurricanes	14	24	3	10	51
No. 10 Razorbacks	0	0	0	7	7

- Date: September 26, 1987
- Location: War Memorial Stadium (Arkansas),
  Little Rock, Arkansas
- Game start: 4:00 PM
- Game attendance: 55,310
- TV announcers (ESPN): Mike Patrick and Lee Corso

Scoring summary
1		Miami	Williams 2-yard run (Cox kick)	Miami 7–0
1	1:14	Miami	Williams 49-yard run (Cox kick)	Miami 14–0
2		Miami	Conley 16-yard run (Cox kick)	Miami 21–0
2	10:10	Miami	Bratton 1-yard run (Cox kick)	Miami 28–0
2		Miami	Irvin 21-yard pass from Walsh (Cox kick)	Miami 35–0
2	0:22	Miami	Cox 28-yard field goal	Miami 38–0
3		Miami	Cox 44-yard field goal	Miami 41–0
4	12:59	Miami	Cox 47-yard field goal	Miami 44–0
4	6:46	Miami	A. Brown 4-yard pass from Erickson (Cox kick)	Miami 51–0
4	3:02	Arkansas	Rouse 7-yard run (Trainor kick)	Miami 51–7

The victory over Florida was followed by a 51–7 victory over #10 Arkansas Razorbacks in Little Rock, which would catapult Miami to a #3 ranking.

=== At No. 4 Florida State ===
Team	1	2	3	4	Total
• No. 3 Hurricanes	3	0	8	15	26
No. 4 Seminoles	0	10	9	6	25

- Date: October 3, 1987
- Location: Doak Campbell Stadium,
  Tallahassee, Florida
- Game attendance: 62,561
- Game weather: 78 °F (26 °C), Sunny, Wind N 15–20 mph (24–32 km/h)
- TV announcers (CBS Sports): Brent Musburger, Pat Haden, and John Dockery

Scoring summary
1	2:58	Miami	Greg Cox 29-yard field goal	Miami 3–0
2		FSU	D. Williams 1-yard run (Schmidt kick)	FSU 7–3
2	2:37	FSU	Derek Schmidt 36-yard field goal	FSU 10–3
3	7:50	FSU	Williams blocked punt return (kick failed)	FSU 16–3
3	2:37	FSU	Derek Schmidt 25-yard field goal	FSU 19–3
3		Miami	Bratton 49-yard pass from Walsh (Brian Blades pass from Walsh)	FSU 19–11
4		Miami	Irvin 26-yard pass from Walsh (Williams pass from Walsh)	Tied 19–19
4	2:22	Miami	Irvin 73-yard pass from Walsh (Cox kick)	Miami 26–19
4	0:42	FSU	Lewis 18-yard pass from McManus (pass failed)	Miami 26–25

Miami's rigorous early season schedule continued the next week with a showdown with #4 Florida State at Doak Campbell Stadium in Tallahassee. The October 3 game featured not only high drama, but also an astounding 56 players who would go on to play in the NFL. Miami scored first with a second-quarter field goal, but Florida State, fielding a team many consider to be the best in school history, took control of the game after that. A 67-yard run by Florida State running back Sammie Smith was followed by a 1-yard touchdown run from Dayne Williams, giving FSU a 7–3 lead. A 36-yard field goal from Derek Schmidt pushed the Seminoles' lead to 10–3 at the half.

After Schmidt missed a third-quarter field goal wide right, Miami took over, but went three-and-out and was forced to punt. The ensuing punt by Jeff Feagles was blocked and returned by Florida State for a touchdown, increasing the Florida State lead to 16–3 (Schmidt missed the extra point). Miami was forced to punt again, and a big return by FSU's Deion Sanders put Florida State in position to add another Schmidt field goal to make the score 19–3.

With Miami having been unable to mount any offense to that point, the Hurricanes looked to be in dire straits late in the third quarter. Spurred on by an impassioned speech from receiver Michael Irvin, the Hurricanes were able to keep their focus and climbed back into the game when Walsh found a streaking Melvin Bratton for a 49-yard touchdown. Miami went for two, which they converted when Walsh was able to hook up with receiver Brian Blades, trimming the FSU lead to 19–11 heading into the fourth quarter.

The final quarter was filled with back-and-forth drama. Irvin started things off when he was on the receiving end of a 26-yard touchdown pass from Walsh. With the score now at 19–17, Miami again went for two, which Miami, again, converted, this time on a pass from Walsh to Warren Williams. With the game now tied at 19–19 and its 16-point lead evaporated, Florida State staged a drive of its own, taking the ball down to the Miami 17-yard line before quarterback Danny McManus fumbled the snap, which was recovered by Bennie Blades. Miami wasted little time in capitalizing on the miscue, as four plays later Walsh hooked up with Irvin for one of the most famous plays in University of Miami history. Walsh walked to the line, read the FSU defense, and called an audible for Irvin, who was appropriately nicknamed "The Playmaker" due to his penchant for making big plays. Walsh took a quick three-step drop and hung the ball up perfectly for Irvin on a fly route. Irvin was in double coverage, but was able to get behind the coverage, catch the pass, and take it 73-yards for a Miami touchdown. With 2:22 left to play, Miami led 26–19.

Florida State would not go meekly, though, as the Seminoles valiantly fought back after taking possession on their own 25-yard line. Before long, the Seminoles were in the endzone when McManus hit Ronald Lewis on a perfect corner route for 18-yards. With college football not having overtime at the time, Florida State head coach Bobby Bowden was faced with a decision: attempt the extra point and settle for a 26–26 tie, or attempt a two-point conversion and go for the win. Complicating matters was that Schmidt, FSU's kicker, had looked shaky on this day, already missing on a field goal attempt and on an extra point attempt. Nevertheless, Bowden initially had decided to kick the extra point and settle for the tie, as he had stated when asked before the game what he would do if he found himself in this exact predicament. But after the FSU offense protested and urged their coach to go for the win, Bowden changed his mind and decided to go for the two, betting both FSU's and Miami's national championship hopes on the outcome. FSU called a pass play. McManus took the snap, looked for a receiver, and then threw into the right corner of the endzone. The ball was underthrown and broken up by Miami defensive back Bubba McDowell before it could reach its intended target. With Miami up 26–25, Florida State attempted an onside kick on the ensuing kickoff, but Miami recovered the ball with 0:42 left and was able to run out the clock, sealing the Hurricane victory.

=== Maryland ===
Having successfully negotiated its brutal early season schedule, Miami won its next four games with ease, beating Maryland (46–16), Cincinnati (48–10), East Carolina (41–3), and Miami (Ohio) (54–3).

=== Virginia Tech ===
Team	1	2	3	4	Total
Hokies	0	10	3	0	13
• #3 Hurricanes	3	7	3	14	27

- Date: November 14, 1987
- Location: Miami Orange Bowl,
  Miami
- Game start: 7:30 PM EST
- Game attendance: 40,105

The Hurricanes, a 38-point favorite, broke a 13–13 tie with 4:51 remaining on a 1-yard TD run by Melvin Bratton. Miami put the game out of reach by scoring the final touchdown with 34 seconds left to win 27–13. This was Frank Beamer's first year as head coach at Virginia Tech.

=== No. 10 Notre Dame ===
Team	1	2	3	4	Total
No. 10 Fighting Irish	0	0	0	0	0
• No. 2 Hurricanes	0	10	7	7	24

- Date: November 28, 1987
- Location: Miami Orange Bowl,
  Miami
- Game start: 3:30 PM EST
- Game attendance: 76,640
- Game weather: 83 °F (28 °C), Sunny, Wind NW 12 mph (19 km/h)
- Referee: John Soffey
- TV announcers (CBS Sports): Brent Musburger, Pat Haden, and John Dockery

Scoring summary
2	11:39	Miami	Bratton 2-yard run (Cox kick)	Miami 7–0
2	3:09	Miami	Cox 30-yard field goal	Miami 10–0
3	3:18	Miami	Bratton 1-yard run (Cox kick)	Miami 17–0
4	5:04	Miami	Conley 6-yard run (Cox kick)	Miami 24–0

Next up for the now 2nd-ranked Hurricanes was a date with #10 Notre Dame in Miami. Notre Dame coach Lou Holtz brought an upset minded Irish squad to the Orange Bowl, but they proved to be little match for Daniel Stubbs and a relentless Hurricane defense. Miami continued its dominance over Notre Dame, shutting out the Irish, 24–0, and beating them for the fourth straight time. It was also the first time Notre Dame had been shutout since 1983, when they were also shutout at the hands of the Hurricanes.

=== No. 8 South Carolina ===
Team	1	2	3	4	Total
No. 8 Gamecocks	6	7	0	3	16
• No. 2 Hurricanes	7	7	6	0	20

- Date: December 5, 1987
- Location: Miami Orange Bowl,
  Miami
- Game start: 8:00 PM
- Game attendance: 76,640
- Game weather: 59 °F (15 °C), Clear, Wind S 10–15 mph (16–24 km/h)
- Referee: Terry Monk
- TV announcers (ESPN): Jim Kelly and Kevin Kiley

Scoring summary
1	10:40	SC	Mackie 40-yard field goal	SC 3–0
1	8:33	SC	Mackie 48-yard field goal	SC 6–0
1		Miami	Irvin 46-yard pass from Walsh (Cox kick)	Miami 7–6
2	9:55	SC	Sterling Sharpe 47-yard pass from Todd Ellis (Mackie kick)	SC 13–7
2	8:06	Miami	Bratton 5-yard run (Cox kick)	Miami 14–13
3		Miami	Brian Blades 56-yard pass from Walsh (kick failed)	Miami 20–13
4	13:51	SC	Mackie 28-yard field goal	Miami 20–16

Miami's final regular season game came at home against #8 South Carolina. South Carolina played a spirited game and gave the Hurricanes all they could handle. Eventually, Miami was able to walk away from the nail biter with a hard-fought 20–16 victory, capping an 11–0 regular season.

=== Vs. No. 1 Oklahoma (Orange Bowl) ===
Miami (FL) vs. Oklahoma

Team	1	2	3	4	Total
• No. 2 Hurricanes	7	0	10	3	20
No. 1 Sooners	0	7	0	7	14

- Date: January 1, 1988
- Location: Miami Orange Bowl,
  Miami, Florida
- Game start: 8:38 pm EST
- Elapsed time: 3:29
- Game attendance: 74,760
- Game weather: 70 °F (21 °C), Clear, Wind E 9 mph (14 km/h)
- Referee: Bill McDonald
- TV announcers (NBC): Don Criqui, Bob Trumpy, and Tom Hammond
- Source: Box Score Archived October 31, 2014, at the Wayback Machine

Scoring summary
1	11:32	Miami	Bratton 30-yard pass from Walsh (Cox kick)	Miami 7–0
2	0:09	OU	Stafford 1-yard run (Lashar kick)	Tied 7–7
3	8:52	Miami	Cox 56-yard FG	Miami 10–7
3	2:37	Miami	Irvin 23-yard pass from Walsh (Cox kick)	Miami 17–7
4	3:41	Miami	Cox 48-yard FG	Miami 20–7
4	2:05	OU	Hutson 29-yard run (Lashar kick)	Miami 20–14

The 1988 Orange Bowl featured "Game of the Century"-type billing as the undefeated and top-ranked Oklahoma Sooners faced off against undefeated and second-ranked Miami for the national championship. Adding to the hype was the recent on-field history between the teams. Oklahoma was a dominant force in college football, winning the national championship in 1985 and losing just one game in each of the preceding two years. Miami, though, had proven to be the thorn in Oklahoma's side, as the Sooners' losses in '85 and '86 had both come at the hands of Miami. Now, with the national championship on the line, Miami sought to make it three-losses-in-three-years for Oklahoma, and also their first postseason bowl win under Jimmy Johnson after three straight bowl losses, two in which they struggled and lost their chances to win the national championships. Further fuel for the fire was provided by the growing personal animosity between former Arkansas player Johnson and Oklahoma head coach Barry Switzer, who was also a former Arkansas player.

Miami's vaunted defense set the tone early, forcing the Sooners to punt on their first five possessions. Meanwhile, Walsh settled into a nice rhythm, putting Miami on the board first with a 30-yard touchdown pass to fullback Melvin Bratton, who caught 9 passes for 102 yards for the game. Oklahoma got on the board with a second-quarter touchdown to tie things up, but Miami responded with 10 unanswered third quarter points, coming on an Orange Bowl record 56-yard field goal by kicker Greg Cox and a 23-yard touchdown pass from Walsh to Irvin. Oklahoma would add a fourth-quarter touchdown to trim the score to 20–14, but Miami held on for the win and the national championship. Johnson received a Gatorade bath, which messed his trademark impeccably coiffed hair, and was carried off the field, having finally won "the big one" at Miami.

The Hurricane defense held Oklahoma to just 255 yards of offense, while Walsh's efficient play (18 of 30, 209 yards, 2 touchdowns) paced the Hurricane offense. Middle linebacker Bernard "Tiger" Clark- a backup middle linebacker who was forced to start after starting MLB George Mira Jr. was suspended for failing a drug test- was named the MVP of the Orange Bowl after recording 14 tackles (12 unassisted).

With the win, Miami completed its first ever undefeated season. In winning their second national championship, the Canes once again had to go through the nation's top-ranked team at the Orange Bowl, just as they had done in 1983.

== Personnel ==
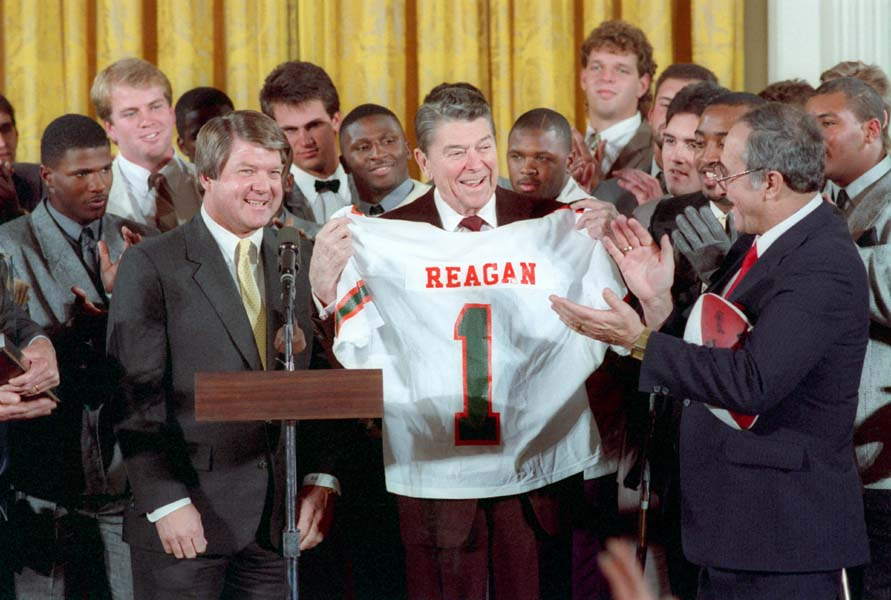
Jimmy Johnson and the 1987 Miami Hurricanes team present President Ronald Reagan with a University of Miami jersey at The White House after winning the 1987 national championship, January 1988

=== Roster ===
1987 Miami Hurricanes football team roster
Players
Coaches
Offense

Pos.	#	Name	Class
QB	4	Steve Walsh	So
FB	5	Melvin Bratton	Sr
QB	7	Craig Erickson	Fr
QB	8	Greg Jones	Fr
WR	9	Brian Blades	Sr
WR	11	Dale Dawkins	So
WR	13	Bret Velde	Fr
RB	20	Shannon Crowell	Fr
RB	21	Alex Johnson	Fr
RB	24	Warren Williams	Sr
RB	25	Hilton Mobley	Fr
RB	28	Leonard Conley	Fr
FB	30	Darius Frazier	So
FB	31	Freddy Highsmith	Jr
WR	33	Brett Perriman	Sr
RB	43	Cleveland Gary	Jr
WR	47	Michael Irvin	Jr
OL	52	Darren Bruce	Jr
C	64	Rod Holder	So
OL	75	John O'Neill	Jr
G	79	Mike Sullivan	Fr
WR	84	Rob Chudzinski	Fr
TE	87	Alfredo Roberts	Sr

Defense

Pos.	#	Name	Class
DB	3	Randal Hill	Fr
DB	6	Kenny Berry	So
DB	15	Jason Hicks	So
DB	17	Trevor Weeks	Fr
DB	18	Tolbert Bain	Sr
DB	19	Darrell Fullington	Sr
LB	22	Randy Shannon	Jr
CB	23	Robert Bailey	Fr
DB	27	Michael Johnson	Fr
DB	29	Donald Ellis	Jr
RB	32	Alex Johnson	Sr
DB	36	Bennie Blades	Sr
LB	45	George Mira Jr.	Sr
DB	48	Bubba McDowell	So
DE	54	Bill Hawkins	Jr
DT	67	Russell Maryland	Fr
DL	86	Derwin Jones	Sr
LB	91	Rod Carter	Jr
DT	96	Cortez Kennedy	So
DT	94	Greg Mark	So
DL	97	Earnest Parish	Jr
DE	96	Danny Stubbs	Sr

Special teams

Pos.	#	Name	Class
K	1	Edgar Benes	So
K	2	Sung Kim	Fr
K	25	Greg Cox	So
TE	82	Charles Henry	Sr
P	38	Jeff Feagles	Sr

Head coach

- Jimmy Johnson

Coordinators/assistant coaches

Legend

- (C) Team captain
- (S) Suspended
- (I) Ineligible
- Injured
- Redshirt

Roster

=== Coaching staff ===
Name	Position	Seasons	Alma mater
Jimmy Johnson	Head coach	4th	Arkansas (1965)
Gary Stevens	Offensive coordinator/quarterbacks	8th	John Carroll (1965)
Dave Wannstedt	Defensive coordinator/Linebackers	2nd	Pittsburgh (1974)
Hubbard Alexander	Wide receivers	9th	Tennessee State (1962)
Joe Brodsky	Running backs	10th	Florida (1956)
Butch Davis	Defensive line	4th	Arkansas (1973)
Art Kehoe	Assistant offensive line	3rd	Miami (1982)
Don Soldinger	Tight ends	4th	Memphis (1967)
Tony Wise	Offensive line	3rd	Ithaca (1972)
Dave Campo	Defensive backs	1st	Central Connecticut State (1969)

=== Support staff ===
Name	Position	Seasons	Alma mater
Bill Foran	Strength & conditioning	3rd	Central Michigan (1977)
Steve Hoffman	Graduate assistant	3rd	Dickinson (1981)
Ron Meeks	Graduate assistant	2nd	Arkansas State (1977)
Tommy Tuberville	Graduate assistant	2nd	Southern Arkansas (1976)

== Awards and honors ==
=== Consensus All-Americans ===
- Bennie Blades, FS
- Daniel Stubbs, LE

=== Awards finalists ===
Bold indicates winners

- **Bennie Blades**, FS – **Jim Thorpe Award**
- Daniel Stubbs, LE – Outland Trophy

=== Jack Harding University of Miami MVP Award ===
- Steve Walsh, QB

== 1988 NFL draft ==
A total of 12 Hurricanes were selected by 10 different franchises in the 1988 NFL draft, including three wide receivers in the first 52 picks.

Round	Pick	Player	Position	NFL club
1	3	Bennie Blades	S	Detroit Lions
1	11	Michael Irvin	WR	Dallas Cowboys
2	33	Danny Stubbs	OLB	San Francisco 49ers
2	49	Brian Blades	WR	Seattle Seahawks
2	52	Brett Perriman	WR	New Orleans Saints
3	56	Dan Sileo	DT	Tampa Bay Buccaneers
3	63	Matt Patchan	OT	Philadelphia Eagles
5	124	Darrell Fullington	S	Minnesota Vikings
6	155	Warren Williams	RB	Pittsburgh Steelers
8	197	Alfredo Roberts	TE	Kansas City Chiefs
10	269	Derwin Jones	DE	Seattle Seahawks
12	331	George Mira Jr.	LB	San Francisco 49ers
