= List of NCAA major college football team yearly scoring leaders =

The list of NCAA major college football team yearly scoring leaders identifies the NCAA major college team scoring leaders. Beginning with the 1937 college football season.

== Scoring leaders since 1937 ==
Year	Team	Points	Team	Points/Game
1937			Colorado	37.0
1938			Dartmouth	28.2
1939			Utah	28.4
1940			Boston College	32.0
1941			Texas	33.8
1942			Tulsa	42.7
1943			Duke	37.2
1944			Army	56.0
1945			Army	45.8
1946			Georgia	37.2
1947			Michigan	38.3
1948			Nevada	44.4
1949			Army	39.3
1950			Princeton	38.8
1951			Maryland	39.2
1952			Oklahoma	40.7
1953			Texas Tech	38.9
1954			UCLA	40.8
1955			Oklahoma	36.5
1956			Oklahoma	46.6
1957			Arizona State	39.7
1958			Rutgers	33.4
1959			Syracuse	39.0
1960			New Mexico State	37.4
1961			Utah State	38.7
1962			Wisconsin	31.7
1963			Utah State	31.7
1964			Tulsa	38.4
1965			Arkansas	32.4
1966			Notre Dame	36.2
1967			UTEP	35.9
1968			Houston	42.5
1969			San Diego State	46.4
1970			Texas	41.2
1971			Oklahoma	44.9
1972			Arizona State	46.6
1973			Arizona State	44.6
1974			Oklahoma	43.0
1975			Ohio State	34.0
1976			Michigan	38.7
1977			Grambling	42.0
1978			Oklahoma	40.0
1979			BYU	40.6
1980			BYU	46.7
1981			BYU	38.7
1982			Nebraska	41.1
1983			Nebraska	52.0
1984			Boston College	36.7
1985			Fresno State	39.1
1986			Oklahoma	42.4
1987			Oklahoma	43.5
1988			Oklahoma State	47.5
1989	Houston	589	Houston	53.5
1990	Houston	511	Houston	46.5
1991	Fresno State	486	Fresno State	44.2
1992	Fresno State	486	Fresno State	40.5
1993	Florida State	518	Florida State	43.2
1994	Penn State	526	Penn State	47.8
1995	Nebraska	576	Nebraska	52.4
1996	Florida	559	Florida	46.6
1997	Nebraska	565	Nebraska	47.1
1998	Kansas State	576	Kansas State	48.0
1999	Virginia Tech	455	Virginia Tech	41.4
2000	Kansas State	514	Boise State	44.9
2001	BYU	608	BYU	46.8
2002	Boise State	593	Boise State	45.62
2003	Boise State; Miami (OH)	602	Boise State; Miami (OH)	43.0
2004	Louisville	597	Louisville	49.75
2005	Texas	652	Texas	50.15
2006	Hawaii	656	Hawaii	46.86
2007	Oklahoma	592	Hawaii	43.38
2008	Oklahoma	716	Oklahoma	51.14
2009	Boise State; Houston	591	Boise State; Houston	42.21
2010	Oregon	611	Oregon	47.0
2011	Houston	690	Houston	42.29
2012	Oregon	644	Louisiana Tech	51.5
2013	Florida State	723	Baylor	52.4
2014	Ohio State	681	Baylor	48.2
2015	Baylor	625	Baylor	48.1
2016	Western Kentucky	637	Western Kentucky	45.5
2017	UCF	627	UCF	48.2
2018	Oklahoma	677	Oklahoma	48.4
2019	LSU	726	LSU	48.4
2020	Alabama	630	Alabama	48.5
2021	Western Kentucky	619	Ohio State	45.7
2022	Georgia	616	Tennessee	46.1
2023	Oregon	619	LSU	45.5
2024	Notre Dame	578	Miami (FL)	43.9
2025	Indiana	666	North Texas	45.1

== Pre-1937 unofficial data ==
Before 1937 the NCAA did not compile official statistics. This chart reflects unofficial scoring statistics for years prior to 1937.

Year	Team	Points	Points/Game
1900			
1901			
1902	Michigan	644	
1903			
1904	Minnesota	725	
1905			
1906			
1907			
1908			
1909			
1910			
1911			
1912	Carlisle	454	
1913			
1914			
1915	Vanderbilt	514	
1916	Georgetown	464	
1917	Georgia Tech	491	
1918			
1919	Centre	485	
1920	California	510	
1921			
1922	California	398	
1923			
1924			
1925			
1926	Haskell	558	
1927			
1928	Florida	336	
1929			
1930			
1931			
1932			
1933			
1934			
1935			
1936			
