= 1987 All-Big Eight Conference football team =

American all-star college football team

The 1987 All-Big Eight Conference football team consists of American football players chosen by various organizations for All-Big Eight Conference teams for the 1987 NCAA Division I-A football season. The selectors for the 1987 season included the Associated Press (AP) and United Press International (UPI).

== Offensive selections ==
=== Quarterbacks ===
- Steve Taylor, Nebraska (AP-1; UPI-1)
- Jamelle Holieway, Oklahoma (AP-2; UPI-2)

=== Running backs ===
- Thurman Thomas, Oklahoma State (AP-1; UPI-1)
- Keith Jones, Nebraska (AP-1; UPI-1)
- Joe Henderson, Iowa State (AP-1; UPI-2)
- Lydell Carr, Oklahoma (AP-2; UPI-2)
- Robert Delpino, Missouri (AP-2)
- Barry Sanders, Oklahoma State (AP-2)

=== Tight ends ===
- Keith Jackson, Oklahoma (AP-1; UPI-1)
- Tom Banderas, Nebraska (AP-2; UPI-2)

=== Wide receivers ===
- Hart Lee Dykes, Oklahoma State (AP-1; UPI-1)
- Dennis Ross, Iowa State (AP-2; UPI-1)
- Rod Smith, Nebraska (UPI-2)
- Willie Vaughn, Kansas (UPI-2)

=== Centers ===
- Bob Latham, Oklahoma (AP-1; UPI-1)
- Jake Young, Nebraska (AP-2; UPI-2)

=== Down linemen ===
- Anthony Phillips, Oklahoma (AP-1; UPI-1)
- Greg Johnson, Oklahoma (AP-1; UPI-1)
- Mark Hutson, Oklahoma (AP-1; UPI-1)
- John McCormick, Nebraska (AP-1; UPI-2)
- Keven Lightner, Nebraska (AP-2; UPI-1)
- Jon Phillips, Oklahoma (AP-2; UPI-2)
- Doug Meacham, Oklahoma State (AP-2; UPI-2)
- Jeff Rigman, Missouri (AP-2)
- Bob Sledge, Nebraska (UPI-2)

== Defensive selections ==
=== Defensive ends ===
- Darrell Reed, Oklahoma (AP-1; UPI-1)
- Broderick Thomas, Nebraska (AP-1; UPI-1)
- Troy Johnson, Oklahoma (AP-2; UPI-2)
- Ricky Shaw, Oklahoma State (AP-2; UPI-2)

=== Down lineman ===
- Neil Smith, Nebraska (AP-1; UPI-1)
- Kyle Rappold, Colorado (AP-1; UPI-1)
- Tim Rother, Nebraska (AP-1; UPI-2)
- David Bailey, Oklahoma State (AP-2; UPI-2)
- Dante Williams, Oklahoma (AP-2)
- Kurt Koch, Colorado (AP-2)

=== Linebackers ===
- Dante Jones, Oklahoma (AP-1; UPI-1)
- Eric McCarty, Colorado (AP-1; UPI-1)
- Steve Forch, Nebraska (UPI-1)
- LeRoy Etienne, Nebraska (AP-2; UPI-2)
- Matt Wallerstedt, Kansas State (AP-2)
- Sim Drain III, Oklahoma State (UPI-2)
- Chris Moore, Iowa State (UPI-2)

=== Defensive backs ===
- Rickey Dixon, Oklahoma (AP-1; UPI-1)
- David Vickers, Oklahoma (AP-1; UPI-1)
- Erik McMillan, Missouri (AP-1; UPI-1)
- Mickey Pruitt, Colorado (AP-1; UPI-1)
- Charles Frayer, Nebraska (AP-2; UPI-2)
- Adrian Jones, Missouri (AP-2; UPI-2)
- Rod Smith, Oklahoma State (AP-2; UPI-2)
- Melvin Gilliam, Oklahoma State (AP-2; UPI-2)

== Special teams ==
=== Place-kicker ===
- Jeff Shudak, Iowa State (AP-1; UPI-1)
- Tom Whelihan, Missouri (AP-2; UPI-2)

=== Punter ===
- Barry Helton, Colorado (AP-1; UPI-1)
- Tom Whelihan, Missouri (AP-2)
- Cary Cooper, Oklahoma State (UPI-2)

== Key ==
AP = Associated Press

UPI = United Press International

== See also ==
- 1987 College Football All-America Team
