= Mark Hutson =

American football player and coach (born 1966)

No. 79
- Position: Guard

Personal information
- Born: August 29, 1966 (age 60); Fort Smith, Arkansas, U.S.
- Listed height: 6 ft 4 in (1.93 m)
- Listed weight: 282 lb (128 kg)

Career information
- High school: Fort Smith (AR)
- College: Oklahoma
- NFL draft: 1988: 3rd round, 67th overall pick

Career history

Playing
- Dallas Cowboys (1988)

Coaching
- Oklahoma (1990–1992) Graduate assistant; Murray State (1993–1996) Special teams coordinator & tight ends coach; Boise State (1997) Special teams coordinator & tight ends coach; Arkansas (1998–1999) Special teams coordinator & tight ends coach; Tulsa (2000–2002) Offensive line coach; Eastern Illinois (2003–2004) Offensive line coach; Eastern Illinois (2005–2006) Assistant head coach & offensive coordinator; Eastern Illinois (2006) Interim head coach; Tulane (2007–2011) Offensive line coach; Tulane (2011) Co-offensive coordinator & offensive line coach; Tulane (2011) Interim head coach; Oakland Raiders (2012–2014) Tight ends coach; Eastern Illinois (2015) Associate head coach & offensive line coach; Cleveland Browns (2016–2018) Assistant offensive line coach; LSU (2019–2020) Offensive analyst; Tennessee State (2021) Offensive line coach; Sallisaw HS (OK) (2022) Head coach; Chadron State (2023) Tight ends coach

Awards and highlights
- National champion (1985); Unanimous All-American (1987); First-team All-American (1986); 3× First-team All-Big Eight (1985, 1986, 1987); OU second-team All-Century Team

Mark Hutson (born August 29, 1966) is an American football coach and former player.

Hutson played college football at the University of Oklahoma, where he was a consensus selection at offensive guard to the 1987 College Football All-America Team. He was selected by the Dallas Cowboys in the third round of the 1988 NFL draft, but an injury ended his playing career before making any regular-season appearances in the National Football League (NFL).

Hutson served as the interim head football coach at Eastern Illinois University for the 2006 season and at Tulane University for the final six games of the 2011 season.

== Early life ==
Hutson attended Fort Smith Northside High School, where he was an All-state offensive tackle. He accepted a football scholarship from the University of Oklahoma. He was named the starter at left tackle as a true freshman, becoming only the seventh true rookie in school history to have earned a letter on the offensive line.

In 1985, he was moved from tackle to left guard in the third game against the University of Texas, where he would remain in the following years. The team would go on to win the national championship in the 1986 Orange Bowl against Penn State University.

In 1986, the offensive line was so effective, that it earned a Player of the Week nomination as a unit, after the season opener 38–3 win against UCLA.

In 1987, he was part of an offensive line that contributed to the Sooners leading the nation with a 499.7 rushing-yard average per game. On October 17, Oklahoma rushed for 518 yards against Kansas State University. On October 31, the team rushed for 565 yards and 8 touchdowns against the University of Kansas, averaging 8.3 yards per carry. In the 1988 Orange Bowl, he picked up an intentional fumble (a fumblerooski play) and ran 29 yards for a touchdown, although the Sooners would lose the game (14-20) and the national championship to the University of Miami. He played in the 1988 Hula Bowl.

He started 36 straight games (the most by a player under Barry Switzer). He also contributed to a 42–5–1 overall record and the 1985 national championship. In 1999, he was selected to the OU second-team All-Century team as one of the Top 100 Players in school History, following a stellar college career, which saw him selected to All-American teams in 1986 and 1987. He was team captain for the 1987 Championship team and was selected All-Big Eight three times.

== Professional career ==
Hutson was selected by the Dallas Cowboys in the third round (67th overall) of the 1988 NFL draft, after dropping because of his limitations in pass-blocking. Two weeks into training camp he suffered a herniated disc that required back surgery to remove it. He was placed on the injured reserve list on August 31.

After trying to regain his playing form, he was eventually waived on June 1, 1989 and forced into early retirement.

== Coaching career ==
Hutson began his coaching career at his alma mater, Oklahoma, in 1990 as a graduate assistant. He coached with Houston Nutt at Murray State University, Boise State University and the University of Arkansas. While with the Razorbacks, Hutson was selected Southeastern Conference Special Teams Coach of the Year.

His coaching travels next took Hutson to the University of Tulsa as the offensive line coach from 2000 to 2002. Following Tulsa, Hutson came to Eastern Illinois University and spent four seasons as assistant head coach, offensive coordinator, and offensive line coach. In the 2006 season, he jumped in as acting head coach when Bob Spoo was sidelined after surgery. The team finished with an 8–5 season record, 7–1 in the Ohio Valley Conference, winning a co-championship with UT Martin.

During Hutson's first tenure at Eastern Illinois, the team won two conference titles and went to the NCAA Division I playoff twice. The team he led as interim head coach lost in the first round of the 2006 playoffs, 24–13, to Illinois State.

Hutson joined the Tulane University staff in 2007 as offensive line coach. He was named interim coach for Tulane's remaining six games following the resignation of Bob Toledo.

On February 11, 2012, Hutson was hired by the Oakland Raiders to be the tight ends coach under head coach Dennis Allen. Following Allen's 2014 dismissal, Hutson was not retained by new head coach Jack Del Rio for the 2015 season.

In 2015, Hutson returned to Eastern Illinois as the associate head coach and offensive line coach. He then returned to the NFL for the 2016 season as the assistant offensive line coach for the Cleveland Browns and remained in that position through 2018. For the 2019 and 2020 football seasons, Hutson served as an offensive analyst at LSU under head coach Ed Orgeron. In 2021, he returned to an on-field coaching position at Tennessee State as the offensive line coach.

In 2022, Hutson was named head football coach at Sallisaw High School in Sallisaw, Oklahoma. In November 2022, Hutson resigned as the head coach at Sallisaw.

== Head coaching record ==
=== College ===
Year	Team	Overall	Conference	Standing	Bowl/playoffs	TSN^{#}
Eastern Illinois Panthers (Ohio Valley Conference) (2006)
2007	Eastern Illinois	8–5	7–1	T–1st	L NCAA Division I First Round	15
Eastern Illinois:		8–5	7–1			
Tulane Green Wave (Conference USA) (2011)
2011	Tulane	0–6 (Note: Bob Toledo served as Tulane's head coach for the first 7 games of the 2011 season before resigning. Hutson was appointed interim head coach for the remainder of the season. Tulane finished the season with an overall record of 2–11 and a conference mark of 1–7.)	0–5	6th (West)		
Tulane:		0–6	0–5			
Total:		8–11				
National championship Conference title Conference division title or championship game berth

=== High school ===
Year	Team	Overall	Conference	Standing	Bowl/playoffs
Sallisaw Black Diamonds () (2022)
2022	Sallisaw	0–10	0–7	8th	
Sallisaw:		0–10	0–7		
Total:		0–10			
