= Nacho Albergamo =

American football player

LSU Tigers
- Position: Center

Personal information
- Born: c. 1966
- Listed height: 6 ft 2 in (1.88 m)
- Listed weight: 257 lb (117 kg)

Career information
- College: LSU (1984-1987)

Awards and highlights
- Unanimous All-American (1987); First-team All-SEC (1987); LSU Athletic Hall of Fame

Joseph "Nacho" Albergamo is a former college football player for the LSU Tigers of Louisiana State University. He earned All-America honors in 1987. He is a member of the LSU Athletic Hall of Fame.

== Medical career ==
In 1993 Albergamo obtained his MD from the LSU School of Medicine in New Orleans, Dr. Albergamo completed his Internship through Ochsner Foundation Hospital in New Orleans and performed his residency in Internal Medicine at Earl K. Long Medical Center, completing the program in 1997. Albergamo joined the group of physicians of the Baton Rouge Clinic in 1997 upon completion of his residency. He now resides in Baton Rouge with his wife and child.
