= Mickey Pruitt =

American football player and coach (born 1965)

No. 52
- Position: Linebacker

Personal information
- Born: January 10, 1965 (age 61); Bamberg, South Carolina, U.S.
- Listed height: 6 ft 1 in (1.85 m)
- Listed weight: 206 lb (93 kg)

Career information
- High school: Robeson (Chicago, Illinois)
- College: Colorado
- NFL draft: 1988: undrafted

Career history

Playing
- Chicago Bears (1988–1990); Dallas Cowboys (1991–1992); Philadelphia Eagles (1994)*
- * Offseason or practice squad member only

Coaching
- University of Colorado (1995–1996) (Graduate assistant); University of Hawaii (1997–1999) (Assistant coach)

Awards and highlights
- Super Bowl champion (XXVII); Second-team All-American (1987); 3× First-team All-Big Eight (1985, 1986, 1987)

Career NFL statistics
- Fumble recoveries: 1
- Sacks: 1
- Stats at Pro Football Reference

Mickey Pruitt (born January 10, 1965) is an American former professional football player who was a linebacker in the National Football League (NFL) for the Chicago Bears and Dallas Cowboys, winning a Super Bowl ring with the Cowboys in Super Bowl XXVII over the Buffalo Bills. He played college football for the Colorado Buffaloes.

== Early life ==
Pruitt attended Chicago's Paul Robeson High School, where his father George was an assistant football coach. He played as a running back and free safety. He also played at wide receiver.

In his senior season, he rushed for over 1,000 yards, scored 18 touchdowns and made 7 interceptions. He was part of a team that had 14 of the 26 players playing both ways, while finishing second in the state of Illinois, the best showing ever by a Public League team.

He finished his high school career with more than 2,000 rushing yards and 32 touchdowns. He was named All-state once and All-city twice. He also practiced basketball.

== College career ==
Pruitt accepted a football scholarship from the University of Colorado Boulder, becoming a part of Bill McCartney's first recruiting class. He was named a starter (8 starts) at strong safety as a redshirt freshman and would not relinquish the position for the rest of his college career. The next year, he posted 63 tackles, after missing two games because of injuries.

As a junior, he registered 106 tackles (73 solo), 5 forced fumbles and 13 passes defensed (second in school history). As a senior, he set a school mark for tackles by a defensive back with 116. He had 5 interceptions, including one returned 18 yards for a key touchdown in the 26–17 against Washington State University.

Pruitt finished ranked as school's All-time tackler (340 tackles) among defensive backs and third in Big Eight Conference history for defensive backs. He registered 41 starts.

In 1989, he was named to the University of Colorado All-Century football team and to the Big Eight Conference All-Decade team.

== Professional career ==
=== Chicago Bears ===
Pruitt was signed as an undrafted free agent by the Chicago Bears after the 1988 NFL draft. He was not selected because he was considered slow for a defensive back and not big enough to be a linebacker.

As a rookie, he was converted into an outside linebacker. He was a backup to Jim Morrissey, playing mostly on special teams and on passing downs. He started in 3 games and suffered a sprained ankle that forced him to miss 2 contests. In the 20–12 playoff win against the Philadelphia Eagles, popularly known as the "Fog Bowl" for the nearly unseeable conditions during the game, he made an important interception of quarterback Randall Cunningham. Pruitt also received the Brian Piccolo Award, given annually to a Bears rookie and a veteran who best exemplify courage, loyalty, teamwork and dedication.

On November 14, 1990, he broke his left hand in a fight with teammate Mark Bortz during a practice, but didn't miss any games. On August 26, 1991, he was waived after being passed on the depth chart by Mike Stonebreaker.

=== Dallas Cowboys ===
On August 27, 1991, he was claimed off waivers by the Dallas Cowboys, to improve the linebackers depth and help on special teams. On September 10, he was placed on the injured reserve list with a pulled left hamstring, but was re-activate on October 11. He appeared in 12 contests, starting at strongside linebacker in the twelfth game against the New York Giants, posting a single-game career-high 9 tackles.

On September 1, 1992, he was released to make room for linebacker Bobby Abrams. He was re-signed on November 18. He appeared in the last 6 games, registering 5 special teams tackles. He was a part of the winning Super Bowl XXVII team. He was cut on August 29, 1993.

=== Philadelphia Eagles ===
On July 20, 1994, he was signed as a free agent by the Philadelphia Eagles. He was released on August 23.

== Personal life ==
From 1995 to 1996, he was a football graduate assistant for the University of Colorado. From 1997 to 1999, Pruitt joined the University of Hawaii Warriors football team as an assistant football coach. In 1999, he was a part of the Chicago Bears player personnel department. In 2012, Pruitt became the director of the Chicago Bears Youth Football Camps.
