= Warren Williams (American football) =

American football player (born 1965)

No. 42, 44
- Position: Running back

Personal information
- Born: July 29, 1965 (age 61); Fort Myers, Florida, U.S.
- Listed height: 6 ft 0 in (1.83 m)
- Listed weight: 202 lb (92 kg)

Career information
- High school: North Fort Myers (North Fort Myers, Florida)
- College: Miami (FL)
- NFL draft: 1988: 6th round, 155th overall pick

Career history
- Pittsburgh Steelers (1988–1992); Indianapolis Colts (1993)

Awards and highlights
- Joe Greene Great Performance Award (1988); National champion (1987)

Career NFL statistics
- Rushing yards: 1,191
- Rushing average: 4.7
- Total touchdowns: 10
- Stats at Pro Football Reference

Warren Williams Jr. (born July 29, 1965) is an American former professional football player who was a running back in the National Football League (NFL). He played college football for the Miami Hurricanes.

== College statistics ==
- 1984: 29 carries for 140 yards. 13 catches for 154 yards and 1 touchdown.
- 1985: 89 carries for 522 yards and 4 touchdowns. 14 catches for 131 yards.
- 1986: 80 carries for 399 yards and 3 touchdowns. 13 catches for 114 yards and 2 touchdowns.
- 1987: 135 carries for 673 yards and 5 touchdowns. 30 catches for 309 yards and 1 touchdown.

== Professional career ==
Williams played in NFL for the Pittsburgh Steelers from 1988 to 1992 and the Indianapolis Colts in 1993. He was selected by the Steelers in the sixth round of the 1988 NFL draft with the 155th overall pick.
