= Jamelle Holieway =

American gridiron football player (born 1967)

No. 4
- Position: Quarterback

Personal information
- Born: June 25, 1967 (age 59); Carson, California, U.S.
- Listed height: 5 ft 11 in (1.80 m)
- Listed weight: 186 lb (84 kg)

Career information
- High school: Phineas Banning (Wilmington, California)
- College: Oklahoma (1985-1988)
- NFL draft: 1989: undrafted

Career history
- Los Angeles Raiders (1989–1990); BC Lions (1991–1992)

Awards and highlights
- NCAA Division I-A national champion (1985); Big Eight Offensive Player of the Year (1986); Big Eight Offensive Newcomer of the Year (1985); 2× First-team All-Big Eight (1985, 1986); Second-team All-Big Eight (1987)

Jamelle Holieway (born June 25, 1967) is an American former college and professional football player who was a quarterback for the University of Oklahoma. He led the Oklahoma Sooners to a national championship in 1985.

Holieway is considered one of the greatest option quarterbacks in NCAA Division I-A history. Highly recruited from Banning High School in Wilmington, Los Angeles, California, under longtime head coach Chris Ferragamo, Holieway attracted interest from a swarm of schools. Oklahoma, Nebraska, Notre Dame, Colorado, Oregon, and USC came after Holieway. His decision to play for the Sooners came at the last minute, as he had a three-year-old sister that he didn't want to leave behind.

== College career ==
At Oklahoma, he took over for an injured Troy Aikman in his freshman year in the Miami game when Jerome Brown and Dan Sileo broke Aikman's leg. Holieway led the Sooners to an 11–1–0 record under Coach Barry Switzer and won the 1986 Orange Bowl against the Penn State Nittany Lions for the national championship. Holieway threw a 71-yard touchdown pass in that game to All-American tight end Keith Jackson. Holieway was the first true freshman quarterback to lead his team to the national title.

Holieway tore the anterior cruciate ligament (ACL) in his left knee in a game against the Oklahoma State Cowboys on November 7, 1987. Holieway was running an option-play to the left and turned to cut upfield. His left knee got caught on the Superturf on Owen Field. He underwent reconstructive knee surgery shortly after the injury, and rehabilitated in the offseason. Though he came back to play the following season, he saw limited action and reinjured the leg on October 8, 1988 versus the Texas Longhorns.

The injury plagued Holieway for the remainder of the 1988 season, and he eventually lost his starting job to Charles Thompson. Thompson, however, broke his leg on the final play of the Nebraska game on November 19, 1988, so Holieway became the starter again for the Citrus Bowl against Clemson, in a 13–6 loss on January 2, 1989.

Holieway finished his Sooner career with 2,713 yards rushing on 539 attempts (an average of 5.0 yards per carry) and 32 touchdowns. Through the air, he threw 257 times, completing 117 passes for 2,430 yards with 22 touchdowns and 15 interceptions. His passing efficiency rating was 84.9 over 39 collegiate games.

Later on, Holieway acknowledged that he received favors from school boosters and Coach Switzer, but denied ever receiving any cash payments.

=== College statistics ===
Season	Passing						Rushing			
Season	Cmp	Att	Pct	Yds	TD	Int	Att	Yds	Avg	TD
1985	27	64	42.1	608	6	2	173	862	5.0	9
1986	32	66	48.5	588	4	6	146	807	5.5	10
1987	21	62	33.9	548	7	4	142	860	6.1	10
1988	37	65	56.9	686	6	3	78	184	2.4	3
Totals	117	257	45.5	2,430	23	15	539	2,713	5.0	32

== Professional career ==
Holieway played professionally for the National Football League's Los Angeles Raiders (1989–1990) and the Canadian Football League's BC Lions (1991–1992).

== Personal life ==
Holieway still lives in Oklahoma and spends much of his summers coaching football camps.
