= 1988 Orange Bowl =

- 54th Orange Bowl "The National Championship"
Miami Hurricanes	Oklahoma Sooners
(11–0)	(11–0)
Independent	Big Eight
20	14
Head coach: Jimmy Johnson	Head coach: Barry Switzer
AP / Coaches; 2 / 2	AP / Coaches; 1 / 1
	1	2	3	4	Total
Miami	7	0	10	3	20
Oklahoma	0	7	0	7	14
- Date: January 1, 1988
- Season: 1987
- Stadium: Orange Bowl
- Location: Miami, Florida
- MVP: Bernard Clark (Miami LB); Darrell Reed (Oklahoma DE)
- Favorite: Oklahoma by 3 points
- Referee: Bill McDonald (CIFOA)
- Attendance: 74,760

United States TV coverage
- Network: NBC
- Announcers: Don Criqui, Bob Trumpy, and Tom Hammond

The Miami Orange Bowl in Miami, Florida, hosted the Orange Bowl.

The 1988 Orange Bowl was the 54th edition of the college football bowl game, played at the Orange Bowl in Miami, Florida, on Friday, January 1. Part of the 1987–88 bowl game season, it matched undefeated teams: the independent and second-ranked Miami Hurricanes and the #1 Oklahoma Sooners of the Big Eight Conference.

Miami was led by head coach Jimmy Johnson and Oklahoma by Barry Switzer. A slight underdog on their home field, Miami won 20–14.

To date, it is the only time the opposing head coaches from a college national championship football game each later served as head coach of the same professional football team, and won the Super Bowl with that team, the Dallas Cowboys. Further fuel for the fire was provided by the growing personal animosity between Johnson and Switzer who coincidentally were both former Arkansas players. Switzer was a 1961 graduate who was the assistant coach on the championship 1964 Arkansas team that featured both Jimmy Johnson and teammate Jerry Jones who became the owner of the Dallas Cowboys whom they both worked for eventually.

== Orange Bowl ==
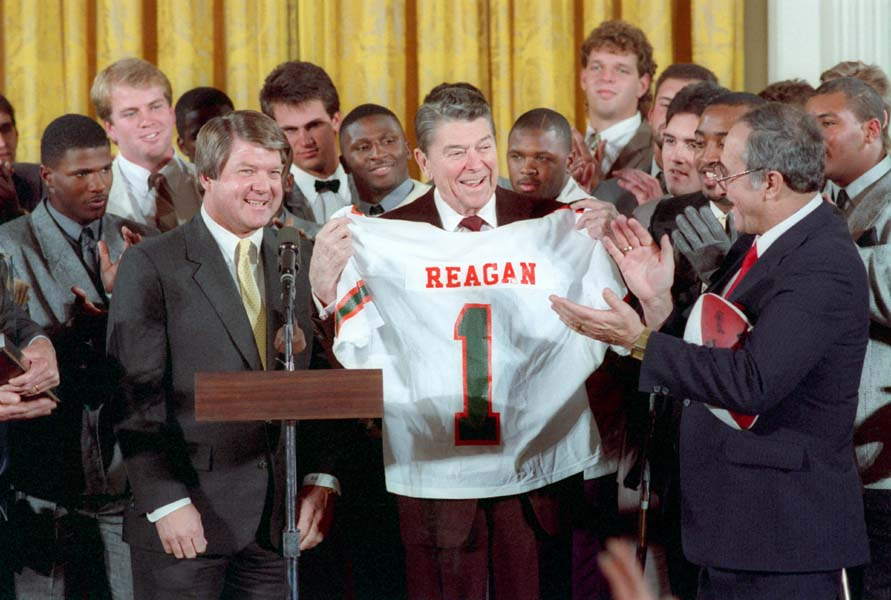
Jimmy Johnson and the 1987 Miami Hurricanes football team present President Ronald Reagan with a University of Miami jersey at The White House after defeating Oklahoma in the 54th Orange Bowl to win their second national championship in the 1987 season, January 1988

The 1988 Orange Bowl featured "Game of the Century"-type billing as the undefeated and top-ranked Oklahoma Sooners faced off against undefeated and second-ranked Miami for the national championship. Adding to the hype was the recent on-field history between the teams. Oklahoma was a dominant force in college football, winning the national championship in 1985 and losing just one game in each of the preceding two years. Miami, though, had proven to be the thorn in Oklahoma's side, as the Sooners' losses in '85 and '86 had both come at the hands of Miami. Now, with the national championship on the line, Miami sought to make it three-losses-in-three-years for Oklahoma, and also their first postseason bowl win under Jimmy Johnson after three straight bowl losses, two in which they struggled and lost their chances to win the national championships.

Miami's vaunted defense set the tone early, forcing the Sooners to punt on their first five possessions. Meanwhile, Walsh settled into a nice rhythm, putting Miami on the board first with a 30-yard touchdown pass to fullback Melvin Bratton, who caught 9 passes for 102 yards for the game. Oklahoma got on the board with a second-quarter touchdown to tie things up, but Miami responded with 10 unanswered third quarter points, coming on a 56-yard field goal by kicker Greg Cox and a 23-yard touchdown pass from Walsh to Irvin. Oklahoma would add a fourth-quarter touchdown to trim the score to 20-14, but Miami held on for the win and the national championship. Johnson received a Gatorade bath, which messed his trademark impeccably coiffed hair, and was carried off the field, having finally won "the big one" at Miami.

The Hurricane defense held Oklahoma to just 255 yards of offense, while Walsh's efficient play (18 of 30, 209 yards, 2 touchdowns) paced the Hurricane offense. Middle linebacker Bernard "Tiger" Clark- a backup middle linebacker who was forced to start after starting MLB George Mira Jr. was suspended for failing a drug test- was named the MVP of the Orange Bowl after recording 14 tackles (12 unassisted).

With the win, Miami completed its first ever undefeated season. In winning their second national championship, the Canes once again had to go through the nation's top-ranked team at the Orange Bowl, just as they had done four years earlier.

=== Scoring ===
First quarter

- Miami – Melvin Bratton 30-yard pass from Steve Walsh (Greg Cox kick)

Second quarter

- Oklahoma – Anthony Stafford 1-yard run (R.D. Lashar kick)

Third quarter

- Miami – Cox 56-yard field goal
- Miami – Michael Irvin 23-yard pass from Walsh (Cox kick)

Fourth quarter

- Miami – Cox 48-yard field goal
- Oklahoma – Mark Hutson 29-yard run (Lashar kick)

MOP: Bernard Clark (Miami LB), Darrell Reed (Oklahoma DE)

== Statistics ==
Statistics	Miami	Oklahoma
First Downs	15	13
Rushes-Yards	38–72	53–179
Passing Yards	209	76
Passes (C–A–I)	18–30–1	5–13–0
Total offense	68–281	66–255
Return yards	7	22
Punts–Avg.	6–44.7	8–39.0
Fumbles–Lost	0–0	4–2
Turnovers	1	2
Penalties–Yards	8–85	5–39
Time of possession	32:08	27:52
