= Mel Bratton =

American football player (born 1965)

Melvin Bratton
No. 32
- Position: Running back

Personal information
- Born: February 2, 1965 (age 61); Miami, Florida, U.S.
- Listed height: 6 ft 1 in (1.85 m)
- Listed weight: 225 lb (102 kg)

Career information
- High school: Miami Northwestern
- College: Miami (FL)
- NFL draft: 1989: 7th round, 180th overall pick

Career history

Playing
- Miami Dolphins (1989)*; Denver Broncos (1989–1990); Atlanta Falcons (1992)*
- * Offseason or practice squad member only

Operations
- Atlanta Falcons (1997–1999) Scout; Washington Redskins (2000) Director of pro personnel

Awards and highlights
- National champion (1987); Second-team All-South Independent (1986)

Career NFL statistics
- Rushing yards: 190
- Rushing average: 3.3
- Receptions: 39
- Receiving yards: 345
- Total touchdowns: 8
- Stats at Pro Football Reference

Melvin Torrence Bratton (born February 2, 1965) is an American former professional football player who was a running back in the National Football League (NFL). He played college football for the Miami Hurricanes, blowing out his knee in the national championship game at the 1988 Orange Bowl against Oklahoma.

Bratton was selected by the Miami Dolphins in 1988 but did not make the team. He reentered the draft the following year and was drafted again in 1989 by the Denver Broncos. Bratton played for the Broncos for two seasons, though never recovered his full athletic ability after the knee injury he suffered in the 1988 Orange Bowl. After his football career, he became a sports agent.

== College career ==
Bratton starred in the 1987 national championship game, the Orange Bowl, against the Oklahoma Sooners. During the game, he suffered a serious injury to his knee, an injury that may have cost him an estimated one million dollars in the NFL because of the diminution it caused in his draft status. At the end of his career, he held the University of Miami record for career touchdowns with 33.

Bratton was interviewed about his time at the University of Miami for the documentary The U, which premiered December 12, 2009 on ESPN.

== Professional career ==
Bratton was originally drafted by the Miami Dolphins in the sixth round of the 1988 NFL draft, but he never signed a contract with the Dolphins.

In the seventh round of the 1989 NFL draft, the Broncos drafted Bratton as the 180th overall pick. He rushed for 190 yards and 4 touchdowns on 57 carries in his brief career. He also added 345 receiving yards and 4 touchdowns on 39 catches. He also returned 5 kickoffs for total of 56 yards averaging 11.2 yards. He scored the winning touchdown to beat the Pittsburgh Steelers in the divisional playoff round after which he said, "I'm glad I got it. In the past, every time I score the winning touchdown, we lose." One such game was the infamous 1984 Miami vs. Boston College game, where Bratton had four touchdowns including a 52-yard score and the go ahead score, which would have sealed the game for Miami if not for the Hail Mary.

In Super Bowl XXIV, in which the Broncos lost to the San Francisco 49ers 55–10, Bratton caught one 14-yard pass from John Elway. He retired after the 1990 season.

== Later career ==
In 1997, Bratton became a scout for the Atlanta Falcons. Bratton became coordinator of NFC pro personnel with the Washington Redskins in 2000. After Redskins owner Dan Snyder fired him from the front office, Bratton founded sports apparel company College Throwback USA.

Bratton became a sports agent after his playing career. Currently, Bratton is employed by Vantage Management Group. In 2008, the NFL began an inquiry into Bratton for contacting Andre Smith, then a college football player for Alabama.

== Personal life ==
Born in Miami, Florida, Bratton graduated from Miami Northwestern High School in 1983. Bratton is a cousin of Geno Smith, New York Jets quarterback. He married Eugenia Bratton June 11, 2011.
