= Sallisaw High School =

Coordinates: 35°27′03″N 94°49′10″W

Location
- 2301 W. Ruth; Sallisaw, Oklahoma; United States

Information
- Type: Public High School
- Principal: Russell Tillery
- Teaching staff: 35.57 (FTE)
- Grades: 9–12
- Enrollment: 585 (2023-2024)
- Student to teacher ratio: 16.45
- Colors: Black and orange
- Mascot: Black Diamonds
- Website: www.sallisawps.org

Sallisaw High School is a high school in Sallisaw, Oklahoma.

The school's history dates back to the early 1900s, though the building itself was constructed more recently.

Oklahoma history and government and physical education is taught in the high school in addition to more nationally typical courses, as mandated by state law.

== History ==
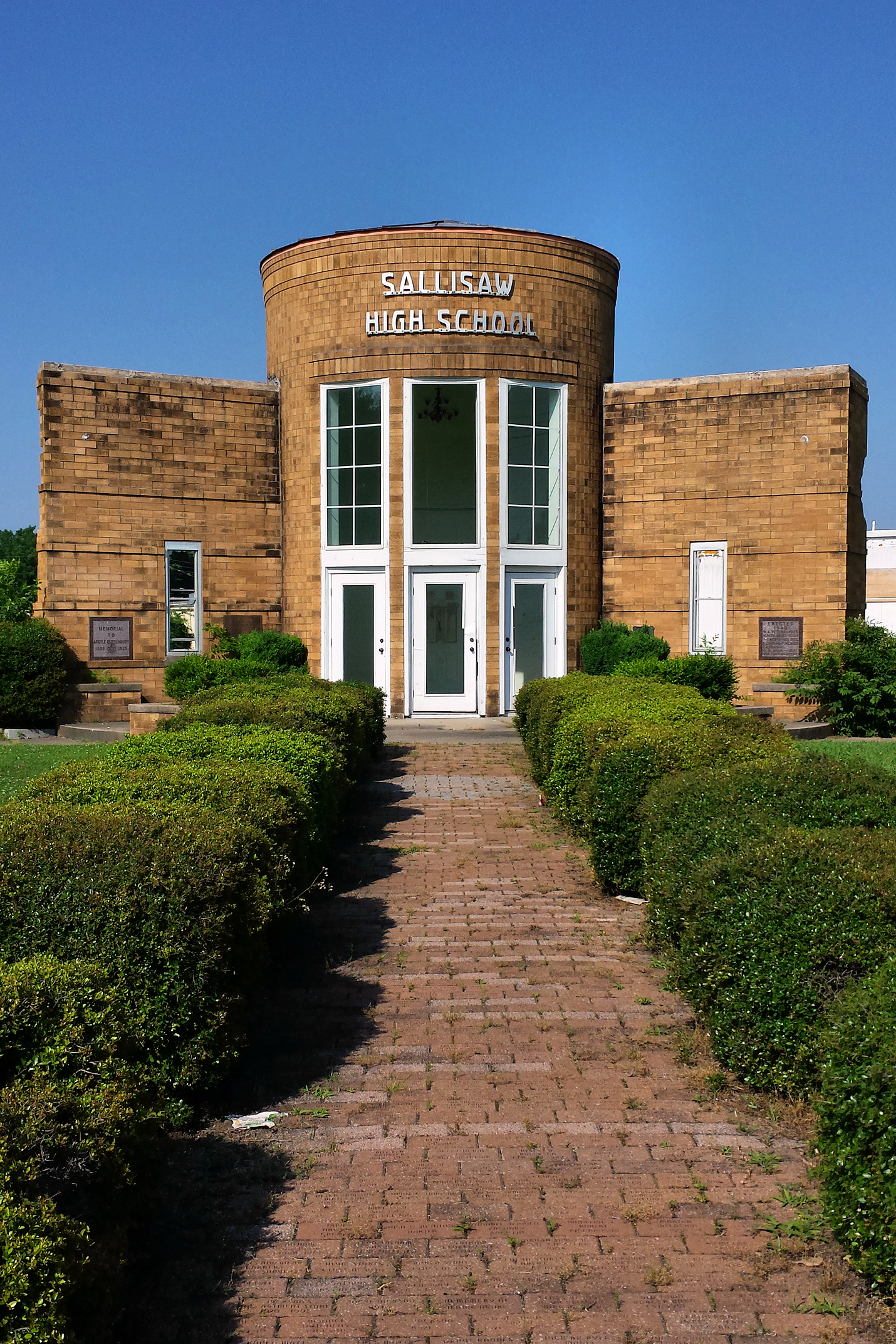
Ruins of the 1940 Sallisaw High School.

After the founding of Sallisaw in 1888, a National School for the Cherokees was established, but non-Cherokee children did not have access to a public school.

In 1900, a school committee was created to secure a building and propose the levying of a school tax to raise money. With property donated by the town founder Argyle Quesenbury, a public school was in operation in a small, two-room building that same year.

A two-story wooden building was constructed just north of the first school in 1902, with the first class of Sallisaw High School organized on the second floor of the building in 1904. J.D. Miller was the first Sallisaw High School principal.

Work began on a three-story brick high school in 1908, but not in time for the first graduating class of Sallisaw High School held in a Methodist church that same year.

Deemed a firetrap, the three-story brick high school was razed in 1939 and a yellow brick, one-story building was completed in 1940 by WPA workers. It served as a high school until 1988. The old building was converted into a museum and burned down in 2004.

In 1986, work began on a new high school on 105 acres (0.42 km^{2}) donated by an anonymous donor. It was completed in 1987. A new gymnasium was completed on January 11, 1994.

== Curriculum ==
In addition to providing typical academic courses in English, mathematics and science, Sallisaw High School offers an Oklahoma social studies course as required by Oklahoma state law.

All Oklahoma high schools must provide a physical education course designed to provide a minimum of 150 minutes of physical education per week, unless provided an exemption by the Oklahoma State Department of Education due to undue hardship.

== Extracurricular activities ==
The Sallisaw High School Band has received numerous distinctions, including Sweepstakes awards. In recent years, the band has placed in 3A, 4A and 5A competitions held in Jenks, Oklahoma, Tulsa, Oklahoma and Stillwater, Oklahoma.

On March 1, 2013, the Sallisaw High School Symphonic Band participated in the Oklahoma Secondary School Activities Association Regional Concert Band Assessment in Tahlequah, Oklahoma and received an "Excellent" rating for their stage performance and a "Superior" rating for their sight reading.

In 2015, 2016, and 2017, the band placed first at the Oolagah Talala Marching Band Invitational. In 2016 and 2017, they placed first at Pryor Band Day. They placed third at Bixby Tournament of Bands in 2017, and also, in 2016, were state finalists in 4A and 5A competition, and were class 4A state champions.

Since then, the band has had three more state championships in a row. These championships were won in the years 2021, 2022, and 2023.
