= Anthony Phillips (offensive lineman) =

American athlete and businessman (born 1966)

No. 68
- Position: Offensive guard

Personal information
- Born: July 6, 1966 (age 60)
- Listed height: 6 ft 3 in (1.91 m)
- Listed weight: 286 lb (130 kg)

Career information
- High school: Jenks (OK)
- College: Oklahoma
- NFL draft: 1989: 12th round, 333rd overall pick

Career history
- 1984–1988: Oklahoma Sooners

Awards and highlights
- National champion (1985); Unanimous All-American (1988); 4× First-team All-Big Eight (1985−1988)

Anthony Phillips (born July 6, 1966) is an American athlete and businessman who played football at the University of Oklahoma from 1984 until 1988. Twice an All-America pick at offensive guard, he was drafted after his senior year by the NFL's Chicago Bears, but Phillips opted to forgo professional football. Phillips chose a business career instead, and is vice president at Bank of Oklahoma.

== Athletic career ==
Anthony Phillips played for Jenks High School and was selected an All-State defensive tackle. Recruited to the University of Oklahoma to play as a linebacker, Phillips redshirted his first year. As an offensive lineman, the 6'3" 274 lb. freshman Phillips played on the 1985 Oklahoma Sooners national championship squad, joining his older brother Jon, who played offensive tackle.

Phillips was an All-Big Eight conference pick as an offensive tackle during his national championship freshman year, and selected academic All-Big Eight. In 1986, Phillips was switched to offensive guard his sophomore year and was chosen all-conference and All-America at the new position, as well as academic All-Big Eight; the 1986 Sooners ended the season ranked #2. In his 1987 junior campaign, Phillips returned a starter at offensive guard and was again selected football and academic all-conference; the 1987 Sooners went undefeated during the regular season, but lost the national championship to Miami in the 1988 Orange Bowl. The 1988 Sooners team finished ranked #14, but Phillips was again selected All-Big Eight and consensus All-America, and for the fourth consecutive year, academic all-conference. In addition, in his senior year his commitment to athletics and academics was honored by the College Sports Information Directors of America, selecting him Academic All-America, and the NCAA, naming him one of the Today's Top Six student athletes.

I knew that my [NFL] career would be short-lived at best and decided I would be better served to move on. It was a hard decision to make at the time; however, I think it was the right decision. The more time that goes by, the better I feel about it. When I’m skiing in Colorado with my family or doing the Tulsa Run, I realize the benefits of making that decision.

— Anthony Phillips,
quoted in Tulsa People, January 2011

During his four seasons, Phillips had been named academic and athletic All-Big Eight each year of his playing career, one of only three OU football players to achieve that accomplishment. But knee injuries before his senior year made playing in the NFL less likely. Phillips was drafted 333rd in the 1989 NFL draft by the Chicago Bears and attended their spring mini-camp, but he decided against attending their training camp.

== Later life ==
Phillips had already been working at a brokerage firm in Edmond, Oklahoma and joined them full-time after passing a Series 3 securities test. Phillips joined Bank of Oklahoma in 2006 and is currently a senior vice president of institutional wealth management. He lives in Tulsa with his wife and three children.
