= Barry Switzer =

American football player and coach (born 1937)

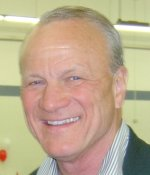
- Switzer in 2006

Personal information
- Born: October 5, 1937 (age 89); Crossett, Arkansas, U.S.

Career information
- Positions: Center, linebacker
- High school: Crossett (AR)
- College: Arkansas (1956–1960)

Career history
- Arkansas (1961–1965) Running backs; Oklahoma (1966–1972) Offensive coordinator; Oklahoma (1973–1988) Head coach; Dallas Cowboys (1994–1997) Head coach

Awards and highlights
- Super Bowl champion (XXX); 3× National champion (1974, 1975, 1985); 12× Big 8 champion (1973–1980, 1984–1987); Sporting News College Football COY (1973); Walter Camp Coach of the Year (1974); 4× Big Eight Coach of the Year (1973, 1974, 1986, 1987)

Head coaching record
- Regular season: NFL: 40–24 (.625); NCAA: 149–24–4 (.853)
- Postseason: NFL: 5–2 (.714); NCAA: 8–5 (.615)
- Career: NFL: 45–26 (.634); NCAA: 157–29–4 (.837)
- Coaching profile at Pro Football Reference
- College Football Hall of Fame

Barry Layne Switzer (born October 5, 1937) is an American former college and professional football coach. He served for 16 years as head football coach at the University of Oklahoma and four years as head coach of the Dallas Cowboys of the National Football League (NFL). He won three national championships at Oklahoma, and led the Cowboys to win Super Bowl XXX. He has one of the highest winning percentages of any college football coach in history, and is the second of only three head coaches to win both a college football national championship and a Super Bowl: the others are his Cowboys predecessor Jimmy Johnson and Pete Carroll with the Seattle Seahawks.

== Early life and career ==
Switzer was born on October 5, 1937, in Crossett, Arkansas, to parents Frank Mays Switzer and Mary Louise Switzer. In early February 1954, Switzer and his younger brother Donnie were home in rural Ashley County, Arkansas with their mother and father when it was raided by the Arkansas Alcoholic Beverage Control Commission and the Arkansas State Police, which found untaxed contraband liquor. Frank made bond but was later tried and convicted of illegal trafficking in alcohol for purposes of resale ("bootlegging"). He was sentenced to five years in prison but the conviction was reversed on appeal. Frank did serve five months of the term and therefore missed seeing Barry play his senior season of high school football.

Switzer and his brother Donnie were at home with their mother on August 26, 1959, when she took her own life with a .38 caliber pistol on the back porch. On November 16, 1972, after they each commenced professional careers, their father was murdered by a jealous lover.

Barry accepted an athletic scholarship and played football at the University of Arkansas, where he joined Pi Kappa Alpha. During his senior season in 1959, he was a Razorbacks "Tri-Captain", leading Arkansas to a 9–2 record, a share of the Southwest Conference championship, a victory over Georgia Tech in the 1960 Gator Bowl, and a No. 9 final ranking in the polls, all in Frank Broyles' second season as head coach. After graduation, he did a brief stint in the U.S. Army and then returned to Arkansas as an assistant coach under Broyles.

== University of Oklahoma ==
Following the 1966 season, Switzer moved to the University of Oklahoma as an assistant coach under new head coach and good friend, Jim Mackenzie. After Mackenzie died of a heart attack following spring practice of 1967, Switzer continued as an assistant under former University of Houston assistant and new Oklahoma head coach Chuck Fairbanks.

Switzer made a name for himself when he was OU's offensive coordinator by perfecting the wishbone offense and developing it into the most prolific rushing offense in college football history. Under Switzer, the Sooners set an NCAA rushing record of 472 yards per game in 1971 and scored over 500 points in two different seasons, 1971 and 1986. When Fairbanks accepted the position of head coach of the New England Patriots following the 1972 season, Switzer was the obvious choice to succeed him.

Switzer became head coach at Oklahoma in 1973. Prior to Fairbanks' departure, he interviewed for the vacant head coaching positions at Michigan State and SMU. He was so successful that by his seventh season in 1979, the St. Petersburg Times wrote that Switzer was the high priest of what Billy Sims, who won the Heisman Trophy in 1978, described as the church of OU football. Switzer led the team to undefeated seasons in 1973 and 1974. Oklahoma won national championships in 1974, 1975, and 1985 under Switzer's leadership. The team won or shared in the Big Eight Conference championship every year from 1973 to 1980. During his sixteen years as head coach at Oklahoma, his teams won eight of the thirteen post-season bowl games they played in, and 54 of his players were selected as All-Americans.

In 1983, Switzer was sued by the U.S. Securities and Exchange Commission (SEC) for an alleged civil violation of the laws prohibiting insider trading of securities. He defended himself as having innocently overheard the information while lounging on the bleacher behind some corporate insiders—at a stadium where Switzer was watching his elder son compete in a track meet. The case was tried in Oklahoma City United States District Court (before a special U.S. District Judge appointed from Kansas). The case was dismissed at the conclusion of the Government's case for its failure to demonstrate that there had been any purposeful disclosure to Switzer.

In 1989, Oklahoma was placed on probation by the NCAA amidst several scandals involving Oklahoma players, including Charles Thompson's arrest for soliciting the sale of cocaine to undercover FBI agents. One of the players Switzer and his staff illegally paid money to was Hart Lee Dykes. OU booster, Bill Lambert, illegally paid between 100 and 150 OU football players. OU recruiting coordinator, Shirley Vaughan, illegally paid dozens of OU football players through a ticket-scalping scheme. In his autobiography, Switzer said he paid $100 an hour to Joe Washington, OU's leading rusher during the 1974 and 1975 national championship seasons. OU 1985 national championship members Keith Jackson, Jamelle Holieway, and Brian Bosworth all openly admitted to accepting illegal payments during their time at OU. In 1989, after sixteen years as Oklahoma's head coach, Switzer chose to resign. OU would have received the death penalty if they had committed just one more violation in any sport over the next five years.

Switzer succeeded in winning against of several prominent contemporaries, including a 12–5 mark against Tom Osborne, 5–3 against Jimmy Johnson, 3–0 against Bobby Bowden, 3-0-1 against Darrell Royal and 1–0 against Joe Paterno, Bo Schembechler, and Woody Hayes. Along with Bennie Owen, Bud Wilkinson, and Bob Stoops, he is one of four coaches to win over 100 games at the University of Oklahoma. No other college football program has had more than three coaches accomplish this.

Switzer was known as an outstanding recruiter of high school talent, particularly in the neighboring state of Texas. His record against Texas in his sixteen seasons as Oklahoma's head coach is 9–5–2 (Switzer did this against three head coaches, as he went 3–0–1 against Darrell Royal, 4–5–1 against Fred Akers, and 2–0 against David McWilliams). The 1984 game between these two universities ended in a 15–15 tie by virtue of a field goal by Texas on the last play of the game. On the next to last play of the game, however, there had been an apparent interception by Oklahoma's Keith Stansberry of a Texas pass thrown into the end zone. But the pass was ruled incomplete by a Southwest Conference official and the interception waved off. Bruce Finlayson, Supervisor of Officials for the 1984 game, later admitted, as reported in the Daily Oklahoman newspaper the following Monday, October 15, 1984, that the officiating crew had made an error in not confirming Oklahoma's interception. The correct call would have preserved a 15–12 Oklahoma victory and therefore would have meant a record of 10–5–1.

== Dallas Cowboys ==
Switzer had seemed content with not being a head coach within the college ranks, once stating, "Every year the coach gets a year older but the product stays the same age. Recruiting has always been something like pimping, I guess, but it never bothered me until I looked in the mirror one day and said to myself, 'Hey, Switzer, what is a fifty-year-old man doing chasing eighteen-year-old boys around the country?'" On March 30, 1994, he was hired by the Dallas Cowboys. Switzer was hired the day after Jimmy Johnson, who had won the last two Super Bowls with Dallas, announced his departure from the team. Many felt that owner Jerry Jones, who had clashed with Johnson, hired Switzer due to wanting a coach who would be more apt to go along with Jones' ideas. He stated that Switzer had the qualities needed in "leadership, charisma, motivation, and a proven winner" to serve as coach; he also once stated that "500 coaches who could win with the talent assembled in Dallas." Incidentally, Switzer had been an assistant coach on the 1964 Arkansas Razorback team that had both Jones and Johnson on the roster. It was reported that one of the first things Switzer did was to ask each of his assistant coaches to name him any jerks that were on the team. The response was that there were none.

Switzer did not get to hire his own staff, as the assistant coaches from the previous season were retained. His first season with the Cowboys was successful; they went 12–4 and advanced to the NFC Championship Game against the San Francisco 49ers for the third straight year. However, the game did not turn out well for the Cowboys, who were down 21–0 after two turnovers in the first five minutes of play. While the Cowboys did narrow the score to 24–14 (after a missed field goal from 27 yards) with a minute to play before halftime, Switzer elected to try and reach for more points with passes on the suggestion of offensive coordinator Ernie Zampese rather than his own idea to run the ball. The result was three incompletions, after which Dallas punted the ball away, leaving enough time and favorable field position for San Francisco to score a touchdown pass to lead 31–14 at halftime. With less than seven minutes remaining in the game, the Cowboys were down 38–28 and driving past midfield when Switzer committed a costly error. When Michael Irvin was bumped by Deion Sanders while being targeted for a pass, leading to an incompletion, Switzer was livid that pass interference wasn't called and made his plea to the officials. While making the plea, to demonstrate the bump, he bumped the official, incurring a 15-yard penalty and leaving the Cowboys with a 3rd and 25 and an eventual loss on downs. The Cowboys failed to score on their next (and last) drive and lost 38–28.

The 1995 season saw a revolving door of free agents coming and going from Dallas, such as the recruitment of Sanders to play in Dallas. The Cowboys won seven of their first eight games. The only ignominious loss was a game against the Philadelphia Eagles, in which Switzer elected to try to convert a 4th and 1 from his own 29 with two minutes remaining. The team elected to do a run play that was about to be called short only for the officials to whistle the play dead due to the two-minute warning having been applied before the snap. However, Switzer elected to run the ball again anyway. The play failed again and the Eagles subsequently kicked a field goal to win. The Cowboys finished 12–4, clinching home field advantage throughout the playoffs. The Cowboys trounced their playoff competition in the NFC, scoring 24 unanswered points against Philadelphia and then beating the Green Bay Packers 38–27 in the NFC Championship Game, winning their third NFC title in four seasons. They faced the Pittsburgh Steelers in Super Bowl XXX. Despite being limited to just 209 yards passing and less than 60 yards on the ground, the Cowboys never trailed, turning three interceptions (two by Larry Brown) into 14 points in a 27–17 victory. The win made Switzer the second coach to win a college national championship and a Super Bowl, the other being Johnson; Pete Carroll joined them in 2014. Switzer thought about retiring after the victory, but he was talked out of it by a friend in view of what Jones had done for him.

The 1996 season saw high hopes for the defending Super Bowl champions, but the resulting season was a roller coaster. Michael Irvin was suspended for the first five games after pleading no contest to felony cocaine possession after being found at a party with topless dancers and drug use. Emmitt Smith ran for over 1,000 yards again, but had his first season with under four yards per carry since his rookie season, while scoring only 12 touchdowns. Key defensive end Charles Haley missed the whole year due to injury. The Cowboys lost three of the first five games, but they went 5–3 in the final eight games (which included two wins in which all of their points were field goals) to clinch the division with a week to play, finishing with an overall 10–6 season. Their record was not enough to give them a top-two seed in the playoffs, so they played in the Wild Card round against the Minnesota Vikings, winning in a 40–15 blowout. For the next round, Dallas traveled to play the second-year Carolina Panthers in Charlotte. The buildup to the game was marred by sexual violence allegations against Irvin and Erik Williams (which were proven to be false after the game). The Cowboys lost both Irvin and Sanders to injury as the Panthers shocked the Cowboys with a 26–17 victory, essentially ending the Cowboys dynasty (the loss was the first of several to follow before the next Cowboy playoff victory in 2009).

In August 1997, Switzer was arrested after a loaded .38-caliber revolver was found in his luggage at the Dallas/Fort Worth International Airport. Switzer, who was returning to the team's training camp facility in Austin, said there were children at his Dallas home and he had put the gun in his bag to hide it from them. He said he accidentally forgot to remove the gun from the bag before heading to the airport. Switzer pleaded guilty, was fined $3,500, and was given one-year deferred adjudication. Two days later, he was fined $75,000 by Jones (equivalent to $140,000 in 2025). Switzer's penchant for being a players' coach came to haunt him with disagreements with quarterback Troy Aikman, who felt the team had a lack of discipline along with poor practice habits. Each reflected upon their disagreements in Troy Aikman: A Football Life, where Aikman felt that Switzer was not the same hard-driving coach that he had seen at Oklahoma while saying the team was "kind of hanging on" in the post-Johnson era. All of this came to a head with the 1997 season, complete with Aikman delivering a heated rant on the sideline during the preseason about not wanting to be the "bad cop" in the routine all the time. The Cowboys started off well, winning three of their first four games, but a sign of trouble brewed with their one loss, which came against the Arizona Cardinals after they blew a 22–7 lead and lost in overtime. They then lost two straight games against division rivals New York Giants and Washington Redskins before a late victory against Jacksonville got them to 4–3. They then traded back-to-back losses with back-to-back wins to reach 6–5 before the wheels fell off with five straight losses. On January 9, 1998, Switzer resigned as head coach of the Cowboys with a 40–24 career NFL coaching record.

== After coaching ==
In late 2000, Switzer was initiated as an honorary member of the Oklahoma Kappa chapter of Sigma Alpha Epsilon. Switzer was elected to the College Football Hall of Fame in 2002. In 2004, he received the Jim Thorpe Lifetime Achievement Award. Switzer still resides in Norman, Oklahoma with his wife Becky, a coach on the 1988 U.S. Olympic team and OU gymnastics coach from 1984 to 2001. In August 2007, XMSN added Switzer as a part of the channel's expanded college sports coverage. On September 9, 2007, Switzer joined the Fox NFL Pregame show. Switzer got into acting after coaching, playing the part of the head coach of the Prattville Pirates in the 1998 movie Possums. Switzer also guest-starred in an episode of TNT's Saving Grace titled "Do You Love Him?", which first aired August 11, 2008. In 2006, Switzer and Toby Keith helped found First Liberty Bank in Oklahoma City. He owns Switzer's Locker Room, Switzer's Vineyards, and a number of other small businesses in the Norman area.

== Head coaching record ==
=== College ===
| Year | Team | Overall | Conference | Standing | Bowl/playoffs | Coaches^{#} | AP^{°} |
|---|---|---|---|---|---|---|---|
Oklahoma Sooners (Big Eight Conference) (1973–1988)
| 1973 | Oklahoma | 10–0–1 | 7–0 | 1st | | 2 | 3 |
| 1974 | Oklahoma | 11–0 | 7–0 | 1st | | | 1 |
| 1975 | Oklahoma | 11–1 | 6–1 | T–1st | W Orange | 1 | 1 |
| 1976 | Oklahoma | 9–2–1 | 5–2 | T–1st | W Fiesta | 6 | 5 |
| 1977 | Oklahoma | 10–2 | 7–0 | 1st | L Orange | 6 | 7 |
| 1978 | Oklahoma | 11–1 | 6–1 | T–1st | W Orange | 3 | 3 |
| 1979 | Oklahoma | 11–1 | 7–0 | 1st | W Orange | 3 | 3 |
| 1980 | Oklahoma | 10–2 | 7–0 | 1st | W Orange | 3 | 3 |
| 1981 | Oklahoma | 7–4–1 | 4–2–1 | 2nd | W Sun | 14 | 20 |
| 1982 | Oklahoma | 8–4 | 6–1 | 2nd | L Fiesta | 16 | 16 |
| 1983 | Oklahoma | 8–4 | 5–2 | T–2nd | | | |
| 1984 | Oklahoma | 9–2–1 | 6–1 | T–1st | L Orange | 6 | 6 |
| 1985 | Oklahoma | 11–1 | 7–0 | 1st | W Orange | 1 | 1 |
| 1986 | Oklahoma | 11–1 | 7–0 | 1st | W Orange | 3 | 3 |
| 1987 | Oklahoma | 11–1 | 7–0 | 1st | L Orange | 3 | 3 |
| 1988 | Oklahoma | 9–3 | 6–1 | 2nd | L Florida Citrus | 14 | 14 |
| Oklahoma: | | 157–29–4 | 100–11–1 | | | | |
| Total: | | 157–29–4 | | | | | |
National championship Conference title Conference division title or championship game berth
^{#}Rankings from final Coaches Poll.; ^{°}Rankings from final AP Poll.

=== National Football League ===
| Team | Year | Regular season | | | | | Postseason | | | |
| Team | Year | Won | Lost | Ties | Win % | Finish | Won | Lost | Win % | Result |
|---|---|---|---|---|---|---|---|---|---|---|
| DAL | 1994 | 12 | 4 | 0 | .750 | 1st in NFC East | 1 | 1 | .500 | Lost to San Francisco 49ers in NFC Championship Game |
| DAL | 1995 | 12 | 4 | 0 | .750 | 1st in NFC East | 3 | 0 | 1.000 | Super Bowl XXX champions |
| DAL | 1996 | 10 | 6 | 0 | .625 | 1st in NFC East | 1 | 1 | .500 | Lost to Carolina Panthers in NFC Divisional Game |
| DAL | 1997 | 6 | 10 | 0 | .375 | 4th in NFC East | – | – | – | |
| Total | | 40 | 24 | 0 | .625 | | 5 | 2 | .714 | |

== Coaching tree ==
Head coaches under whom Switzer served:

- Frank Broyles: Arkansas (1961–1965)
- Jim Mackenzie: Oklahoma (1966)
- Chuck Fairbanks: Oklahoma (1967–1972)

Assistant coaches under Barry Switzer who became NCAA or NFL head coaches:

- Tim Billings: Southeast Missouri State (2000–2005), Southern Mississippi (2020)
- John Blake: Oklahoma (1996–1998)
- Mack Brown: Appalachian State (1983), Tulane (1985–1987), North Carolina (1988–1997, 2019–2024), Texas (1998–2013)
- Dave Campo: Dallas Cowboys (2000–2002)
- Jim Donnan: Marshall (1990–1995), Georgia (1996–2000)
- Donnie Duncan: Iowa State (1979–1982)
- Gary Gibbs: Oklahoma (1989–1994)
- Galen Hall: Florida (1984–1989)
- Larry Lacewell: Arkansas State (1979–1989)
- Brad Lambert: Charlotte (2011–2018)
- Wendell Mosley: Texas Southern (1976–1978)
- Jerry Pettibone: Northern Illinois (1985–1990), Oregon State (1991–1996)
- Charlie Sadler: Northern Illinois (1991–1995)
- Mike Shanahan: Los Angeles Raiders (1988–1989), Denver Broncos (1995–2008), Washington Redskins (2010–2013)
- Mike Zimmer: Minnesota Vikings (2014–2021)
