= Dante Jones =

American football player (born 1965)

No. 53
- Position: Linebacker

Personal information
- Born: March 23, 1965 (age 61); Houston, Texas, U.S.
- Listed height: 6 ft 1 in (1.85 m)
- Listed weight: 235 lb (107 kg)

Career information
- High school: Skyline (Dallas, Texas)
- College: Oklahoma
- NFL draft: 1988: 2nd round, 51st overall pick

Career history
- Chicago Bears (1988–1994); Denver Broncos (1995)

Awards and highlights
- National champion (1985); Consensus All-American (1987); Big Eight Defensive Player of the Year (1987); First-team All-Big Eight (1987)

Career NFL statistics
- Sacks: 3
- Interceptions: 4
- Fumble recoveries: 5
- Stats at Pro Football Reference

Dante Delaneo Jones (born March 23, 1965) is an American former professional football player who was a linebacker in the National Football League (NFL) for the Chicago Bears from 1988 to 1994 and Denver Broncos in 1995. He played college football for the Oklahoma Sooners and was selected 51st overall by the Bears in the second round of the 1988 NFL draft.

As a Sooner, Jones was the 1987 Orange Bowl MVP. As a senior Jones was an All Big 8 selection, Big 8 defensive player of the year and consensus All-American at linebacker in 1987. Jones came in third in the Butkus Award voting. He graduated in 1983 from Skyline High School in Dallas, Texas.
