= George Mira Jr. =

American football player

George Mira Jr. (born June 13, 1965) is a former All-American linebacker for the University of Miami Hurricanes football team during the mid-1980s, taking over the reins after the departure of Jay Brophy.

The son of former U.M quarterback George Mira Sr., Mira Jr. had a stellar career at the University of Miami where he earned First Team All-South Independent Honors in 1985, 1986 and 1987, until the 1987 National Championship Game, his last game of his senior year, before which he was suspended by the NCAA for diuretics use. The suspension endangered his draft status, which sent him down to the 12th round of the 1988 NFL draft, where he was selected by the San Francisco 49ers, but did not manage to play in a single NFL game.
