= Patrick Collins (American football) =

American football player (born 1966)

No. 25
- Position: Running back

Personal information
- Born: August 4, 1966 (age 60); Okmulgee, Oklahoma, U.S.
- Listed height: 5 ft 9 in (1.75 m)
- Listed weight: 177 lb (80 kg)

Career information
- High school: Booker T. Washington (Tulsa, Oklahoma)
- College: Oklahoma
- NFL draft: 1988: 8th round, 200th overall pick

Career history
- Green Bay Packers (1988); Cleveland Browns (1989)*
- * Offseason or practice squad member only

Awards and highlights
- National champion (1985)

Career NFL statistics
- Games played: 5
- Receiving yards: 17
- Rushing yards: 2
- Stats at Pro Football Reference

Patrick Collins (born August 4, 1966) is an American former professional football player who was a running back in the National Football League (NFL). He played college football for the Oklahoma Sooners.

== Biography ==
Collins was born Patrick Norman Collins on August 4, 1966, in Okmulgee, Oklahoma.

== Career ==
Collins was selected 200th overall by the Green Bay Packers in the eighth round of the 1988 NFL draft, and played that season with the team. He played at the collegiate level at the University of Oklahoma.
