= Caesar Rentie =

American football player (born 1964)

No. 71
- Position: Offensive tackle

Personal information
- Born: November 10, 1964 (age 61); Kansas City, Kansas , U.S.
- Listed height: 6 ft 3 in (1.91 m)
- Listed weight: 293 lb (133 kg)

Career information
- High school: Hartshorne (OK)
- College: Oklahoma
- NFL draft: 1988: 7th round, 189th overall pick

Career history
- Chicago Bears (1988); Buffalo Bills (1989)*; Indianapolis Colts (1990)*; Detroit Lions (1991)*; New York/New Jersey Knights (1991–1992); Dallas Cowboys (1994)*
- * Offseason or practice squad member only

Awards and highlights
- National champion (1985)

Career NFL statistics
- Games played: 5
- Stats at Pro Football Reference

Caesar Rentie (born November 10, 1964) is an American former professional football player who was a tackle for the Chicago Bears of the National Football League (NFL). He played college football for the Oklahoma Sooners. He was drafted and played for the Bears in 1988 and for the New York/New Jersey Knights from 1991 to 1992.
