= Keith Jackson (tight end) =

American football player (born 1965)

No. 88
- Position: Tight end

Personal information
- Born: April 19, 1965 (age 61); Little Rock, Arkansas, U.S.
- Listed height: 6 ft 2 in (1.88 m)
- Listed weight: 258 lb (117 kg)

Career information
- High school: Parkview (Little Rock)
- College: Oklahoma (1984–1987)
- NFL draft: 1988: 1st round, 13th overall pick

Career history
- Philadelphia Eagles (1988–1991); Miami Dolphins (1992–1994); Green Bay Packers (1995–1996)

Awards and highlights
- Super Bowl champion (XXXI); UPI NFC Rookie of the Year (1988); 4× First-team All-Pro (1988–1990, 1992); 5× Pro Bowl (1988–1990, 1992, 1996); PFWA NFL All-Rookie Team (1988); National champion (1985); 2× Unanimous All-American (1986, 1987); Second-team All-American (1985); 3× First-team All-Big Eight (1985–1987); Second-team AP All-Time All-American (2025)

Career NFL statistics
- Receptions: 441
- Receiving yards: 5,283
- Receiving touchdowns: 49
- Stats at Pro Football Reference
- College Football Hall of Fame

Keith Jerome Jackson (born April 19, 1965) is an American former professional football player who was a tight end in the National Football League (NFL) for the Philadelphia Eagles (1988–1991), Miami Dolphins (1992–1994), and Green Bay Packers (1995–1996). He played college football for the Oklahoma Sooners.

== Early life ==
Jackson was born in Little Rock, Arkansas. He attended Little Rock Parkview High School and garnered All-State team honors on offense (tight end) and defense (safety). He was named to the 1983 Parade All-American Team. In 2011, Parade named Jackson to the Top Parade All-America High School Football Players of All Time.

== College career ==
Jackson played for the University of Oklahoma from 1984 to 1987, where he was nicknamed "Boomer Sooner". The Sooners had a 42–5–1 record in his four seasons and won a national championship in 1985. Jackson caught a total of 62 passes for 1,407 yards, at an average of 23.7 yards per catch, and was a College Football All-America Team selection in 1985, 1986, and 1987.

In the 1986 Orange Bowl, played for the national championship, Jackson caught a 71-yard pass from Jamelle Holieway for a touchdown, the first of his team's two touchdowns in the Sooners' victory over Penn State.

Jackson was inducted into the College Football Hall of Fame in 2001. He was later voted Offensive Player of the Century at the University of Oklahoma.

He is also a member of Omega Psi Phi.

Jackson, as well as teammates Holieway and Brian Bosworth all openly admitted to accepting illegal payments during their time at OU. It was one of the main reasons why Jackson chose Oklahoma over his homestate Arkansas Razorbacks.

== Professional career ==
Pre-draft measurables
Height	Weight	Hand span	40-yard dash	10-yard split	20-yard split	20-yard shuttle	Vertical jump
6 ft 2 3/8 in (1.89 m)	250 lb (113 kg)	9 1/2 in (0.24 m)	4.69 s	1.71 s	2.77 s	4.59 s	29.0 in (0.74 m)

After being drafted 13th overall by the Philadelphia Eagles in the first round of the 1988 NFL draft, Jackson recorded 81 receptions for 869 yards, and 6 touchdowns in his first season, along with seven catches for 142 yards in the Eagles' only playoff game that year, and won the NFC Rookie of the Year award. The Eagles team record of 869 receiving yards in Jackson's rookie season was broken by DeSean Jackson in 2008, who also became the first rookie since Keith Jackson to lead the team in receptions. In 1992, Jackson was part of a lawsuit to challenge the "Plan B" form of free agency (filing the suit in federal court), which let each team protect 37 players in a limited form of free agency. When the lawsuit was ruled in favor of the filers, Jackson was declared a free agent immediately.

On September 28, 1992, he signed a four-year, $6 million contract with the Miami Dolphins. Jackson made his Miami Dolphins debut six days later in a 37–10 win versus the eventual AFC champion Buffalo Bills, recording four receptions and 64 receiving yards, including a 24-yard touchdown score.

In his nine seasons, Jackson made the Pro Bowl five times (1988–1990, 1992, 1996). On March 29, 1995, he was traded to the Green Bay Packers for a second round draft pick when Miami signed Eric Green, making Jackson expendable. Initially not happy, he held out until October, crediting Reggie White among other things. In his final season, Jackson made 40 receptions for 505 yards and a career-high 10 touchdowns, assisting the Green Bay Packers to a 13–3 record and a win in Super Bowl XXXI. On March 26, 1997, he announced his retirement, stating that he had noticed his skills were starting to decline but also noting that the win influenced him to retire on top.

Jackson finished his career with 441 receptions for 5,283 yards and 49 touchdowns, with the latter category being 3rd most among tight ends when he retired.

During his career, every time he had a highlight on NFL Primetime, ESPN anchor Chris Berman would make reference to his famous name by imitating the voice of sports broadcaster Keith Jackson.

In 2022, the Professional Football Researchers Association named Jackson to the PFRA Hall of Very Good Class of 2022.

== NFL career statistics ==
Legend
	Won the Super Bowl
**Bold**	Career high

=== Regular season ===
Year	Team	Games		Receiving				
Year	Team	GP	GS	Rec	Yds	Avg	Lng	TD
1988	PHI	16	15	**81**	**869**	10.7	41	6
1989	PHI	14	12	63	648	10.3	33	3
1990	PHI	14	14	50	670	13.4	37	6
1991	PHI	16	16	48	569	11.9	**73**	5
1992	MIA	13	11	48	594	12.4	42	5
1993	MIA	15	15	39	613	**15.7**	57	6
1994	MIA	16	16	59	673	11.4	35	7
1995	GB	9	1	13	142	10.9	22	1
1996	GB	16	5	40	505	12.6	51	**10**
Career		129	105	441	5,283	12.0	73	49

== After football ==
Jackson was a color commentator on radio broadcasts for the Arkansas Razorbacks, but is now retired. His eldest son, Keith Jackson Jr., played defensive line at Arkansas and was selected by the St. Louis Rams in the 2007 NFL draft. His younger son, Koilan, played wide receiver at Arkansas; however announced his retirement from college football (due to injuries) on August 25, 2021.

In November 2012, Jackson was named as a 2013 recipient of the NCAA Silver Anniversary Award, presented each year to six distinguished former college student-athletes on the 25th anniversary of the completion of their college sports careers.

Jackson is also the founder of P.A.R.K., Positive Atmosphere Reaches Kids, a non-profit organization and an outreach program for inner city youths in Little Rock.
