= Darrell Reed =

American football player (born 1965)

Profile
- Position: Defensive end

Personal information
- Born: July 28, 1965 (age 61)
- Listed height: 6 ft 1 in (1.85 m)
- Listed weight: 225 lb (102 kg)

Career information
- High school: Cypress-Fairbanks (Cypress, Texas)
- College: Oklahoma
- NFL draft: 1988: 5th round, 116th overall pick

Career history
- Green Bay Packers (1988)*
- * Offseason or practice squad member only

Awards and highlights
- National champion (1985); First-team All-American (1987); Third-team All-American (1986); 4× First-team All-Big Eight (1984−1987)

Darrell R. Reed (born July 28, 1965) is an American former college football player who was a defensive end for the Oklahoma Sooners. He was selected by the Green Bay Packers in the fifth round of the 1988 NFL draft with the 116th overall pick.

== See also ==
- 1985 Oklahoma Sooners football team
