= Lydell Carr =

American football player (born 1965)

No. 45, 44, 28
- Position: Running back

Personal information
- Born: May 27, 1965 (age 61); Enid, Oklahoma, U.S.
- Listed height: 6 ft 1 in (1.85 m)
- Listed weight: 226 lb (103 kg)

Career information
- High school: Enid
- College: Oklahoma
- NFL draft: 1988: 4th round, 106th overall pick

Career history
- New Orleans Saints (1988); Phoenix Cardinals (1989); Barcelona Dragons (1991); Ohio Glory (1992)

Career NFL statistics
- Return yards: 15
- Stats at Pro Football Reference

Lydell Maurice Carr (born May 27, 1965) is an American former professional football player who was a running back for the Phoenix Cardinals of the National Football League (NFL). He was selected by the New Orleans Saints in the fourth round of the 1988 NFL draft. He played college football for the Oklahoma Sooners. He also played in the World League of American Football (WLAF) for the Barcelona Dragons and Ohio Glory. Carr was born and grew up in Enid, Oklahoma. He played football for Enid High School, graduating in 1984. Enid is scheduled to name a street Lydell Carr Drive to honor him in 2024.
