= 1985 Oklahoma State Cowboys football team =

American college football season

1985 Oklahoma State Cowboys football

Gator Bowl, L 23–34 vs. Florida State
- Conference: Big Eight Conference
- Record: 8–4 (4–3 Big 8)
- Head coach: Pat Jones (2nd season)
- Offensive coordinator: Larry Coker (3rd season)
- Defensive coordinator: Louis Campbell (1st season)
- Home stadium: Lewis Field

1985 Big Eight Conference football standings
	Conf.					Overall
Team	W		L		T	W		L		T
No. 1 Oklahoma $	7	–	0	–	0	11	–	1	–	0
No. 11 Nebraska	6	–	1	–	0	9	–	3	–	0
Oklahoma State	4	–	3	–	0	8	–	4	–	0
Colorado	4	–	3	–	0	7	–	5	–	0
Iowa State	3	–	4	–	0	5	–	6	–	0
Kansas	2	–	5	–	0	6	–	6	–	0
Kansas State	1	–	6	–	0	1	–	10	–	0
Missouri	1	–	6	–	0	1	–	10	–	0
$ – Conference champion; Rankings from AP Poll

The 1985 Oklahoma State Cowboys football team represented Oklahoma State University in the Big Eight Conference during the 1985 NCAA Division I-A football season. In their second season under head coach Pat Jones, the Cowboys compiled an 8–4 record (4–3 against conference opponents), tied for third place in the conference, and outscored opponents by a combined total of 255 to 188.

The team's statistical leaders included Thurman Thomas with 1,650 rushing yards and 102 points scored, Ronnie Williams with 1,757 passing yards, and Bobby Riley with 659 receiving yards.

The team played its home games at Lewis Field in Stillwater, Oklahoma.

== Schedule ==
Date	Opponent	Rank	Site	TV	Result	Attendance	Source
September 7	at No. 12 Washington*	No. 16	Husky Stadium; Seattle, WA		W 31–17	59,205	
September 14	North Texas State*	No. 8	Lewis Field; Stillwater, OK		W 10–9	49,100	
September 28	Miami (OH)*	No. 7	Lewis Field; Stillwater, OK		W 45–10		
October 5	Tulsa*	No. 6	Lewis Field; Stillwater, OK (rivalry)		W 25–13	49,400	
October 12	No. 9 Nebraska	No. 5	Lewis Field; Stillwater, OK		L 24–34	50,400	
October 26	at Kansas	No. 12	Memorial Stadium; Lawrence, KS		W 17–10	35,200	
November 2	at Colorado	No. 12	Folsom Field; Boulder, CO		W 14–11	35,860	
November 9	Kansas State^{†}	No. 10	Lewis Field; Stillwater, OK		W 35–3	50,000	
November 16	at Missouri	No. 10	Faurot Field; Columbia, MO		W 21–19	36,993	
November 23	at Iowa State	No. 7	Cyclone Stadium; Ames, IA		L 10–15	40,025	
November 30	No. 3 Oklahoma	No. 17	Lewis Field; Stillwater, OK (Bedlam Series)		L 0–13	44,000	
December 30	vs. No. 18 Florida State*	No. 19	Gator Bowl Stadium; Jacksonville, FL (Gator Bowl)	ABC	L 23–34	79,417	
*Non-conference game; ^{†}Homecoming; Rankings from AP Poll released prior to the game

== Game summaries ==
=== Oklahoma ===
#3 Oklahoma Sooners (8–1) at #17 Oklahoma State Cowboys (8–2)

Quarter	1	2	3	4	Total
Oklahoma	0	10	0	3	13
Oklahoma St	0	0	0	0	0

at Lewis Field, Stillwater, Oklahoma

- Date: November 30
- Game time: 7:30 p.m. EST
- Game weather: low 20s
- Game attendance: 44,000
- TV: ESPN

Game information

First quarter

- No scoring

Second quarter

- OU – Tim Lashar 27-yard field goal. Oklahoma 3–0. Drive:
- OU – Spencer Tillman 3-yard run (Tim Lashar kick). Oklahoma 10–0. Drive:

Third quarter

- No scoring

Fourth quarter

- OU – Tim Lashar 30-yard field goal, 5:44. Oklahoma 13–0. Drive:

Top passers

- OU – Jamelle Holieway – 4/5, 54 yards, INT
- OSU – Ronnie Williams – 5/25, 32 yards, INT

Top rushers

- OU – Lydell Carr – 24 rushes, 78 yards
- OSU – Thurman Thomas – 23 rushes, 100 yards

Top receivers

- OU – Damon Stell – 1 reception, 31 yards
- OSU – Kenneth Brown – 1 reception, 15 yards

== Roster ==
1985 Oklahoma State Cowboys football team roster
Players
Coaches
Offense

Pos.	#	Name	Class
WR		Lynn Beck
OL		Paul Blair
TE		Kenneth Brown
OL		Derek Burton
TE		J.R. Dillard
WR		Hart Lee Dykes	Fr
QB		Roderick Gaines
RB		Harold Greene
RB		Garrett Limbrick
RB		Curtis Luper
OL		Doug Meacham
RB		Joe Miller
RB		Mitch Nash
QB		Rusty Rankin
WR		Bob Riley
OL		Chuck Shanklin
RB	34	Thurman Thomas	So
RB		Will Timmons
OL		David Tucker
WR		Terry Wemer
QB		Ronnie Williams

Defense

Pos.	#	Name	Class
LB		Ricky Adams
DB		Melvin Gilliam
LB		James Ham
DL		Dana Hawkins
DB		Mike Hudson
DB	44	Mark Moore	Jr
DL		Leslie O'Neal
DL		Ricky Shaw
DL		Warren Thompson
DL		Brian Fitzgerald
DL		John Washington
DB		DeMise Williams
DB		Windell Yancy

Special teams

Pos.	#	Name	Class
P		Cary Cooper
K		Brad Dennis
K		Joey O'Donnell
P		Rich Thompson

Head coach

- Pat Jones

Coordinators/assistant coaches

- Larry Coker – Offensive coordinator
- Houston Nutt – Quarterback/Wide receivers
- Bill Shimek – Running backs
- Brad Seely – Offensive line
- Louis Campbell – Defensive coordinator/defensive backs
- George Walstad – Defensive line
- Willie Anderson – Defensive ends
- Reggie Herring – Linebackers
- Kevin Steele – Linebackers/tight ends

Legend

- (C) Team captain
- (S) Suspended
- (I) Ineligible
- Injured
- Redshirt

== After the season ==
The 1986 NFL draft was held on April 29–30, 1986. The following Cowboys were selected.

Round	Pick	Player	Position	NFL club
1	8	Leslie O'Neal	Defensive end	San Diego Chargers
3	73	John Washington	Defensive end	New York Giants
4	110	Paul Blair	Tackle	Chicago Bears
