= 1985 Nebraska Cornhuskers football team =

American college football season

1985 Nebraska Cornhuskers football

Fiesta Bowl, L 23–27 vs. Michigan
- Conference: Big Eight Conference

Ranking
- Coaches: No. 10
- AP: No. 11
- Record: 9–3 (6–1 Big 8)
- Head coach: Tom Osborne (13th season)
- Offensive scheme: I formation
- Defensive coordinator: Charlie McBride (5th season)
- Base defense: 5–2
- Home stadium: Memorial Stadium

1985 Big Eight Conference football standings
	Conf.					Overall
Team	W		L		T	W		L		T
No. 1 Oklahoma $	7	–	0	–	0	11	–	1	–	0
No. 11 Nebraska	6	–	1	–	0	9	–	3	–	0
Oklahoma State	4	–	3	–	0	8	–	4	–	0
Colorado	4	–	3	–	0	7	–	5	–	0
Iowa State	3	–	4	–	0	5	–	6	–	0
Kansas	2	–	5	–	0	6	–	6	–	0
Kansas State	1	–	6	–	0	1	–	10	–	0
Missouri	1	–	6	–	0	1	–	10	–	0
$ – Conference champion; Rankings from AP Poll

The 1985 Nebraska Cornhuskers football team represented the University of Nebraska–Lincoln in the 1985 NCAA Division I-A football season. The team was coached by Tom Osborne and played their home games in Memorial Stadium in Lincoln, Nebraska. The season opener against Florida State was the last season opening loss until 2015.

== Schedule ==
Date	Time	Opponent	Rank	Site	TV	Result	Attendance	Source
September 7	2:30 pm	No. 17 Florida State*	No. 10	Memorial Stadium; Lincoln, NE	ABC	L 13–17	75,943	
September 21	1:30 pm	No. 20 Illinois*	No. 18	Memorial Stadium; Lincoln, NE		W 52–25	76,149	
September 28	1:30 pm	Oregon*	No. 16	Memorial Stadium; Lincoln, NE		W 63–0	75,947	
October 5	1:30 pm	New Mexico*	No. 13	Memorial Stadium; Lincoln, NE		W 38–7	75,902	
October 12	6:45 pm	at No. 5 Oklahoma State	No. 9	Lewis Field; Stillwater, OK	ESPN	W 34–24	50,400	
October 19	11:30 am	at Missouri	No. 7	Faurot Field; Columbia, MO (rivalry)	Raycom	W 28–20	62,733	
October 26	2:30 pm	Colorado^{†}	No. 5	Memorial Stadium; Lincoln, NE (rivalry)	ABC	W 17–7	76,014	
November 2	1:30 pm	at Kansas State	No. 5	KSU Stadium; Manhatta, KS (rivalry)		W 41–3	41,200	
November 9	1:30 pm	Iowa State	No. 3	Memorial Stadium; Lincoln, NE (rivalry)		W 49–0	75,920	
November 16	1:30 pm	Kansas	No. 2	Memorial Stadium; Lincoln, NE (rivalry)		W 56–6	75,863	
November 23	2:30 pm	at No. 5 Oklahoma	No. 2	Oklahoma Memorial Stadium; Norman, OK (rivalry)	ABC	L 7–27	75,554	
January 1, 1986	12:30 pm	vs. No. 5 Michigan*	No. 7	Sun Devil Stadium; Tempe, AZ (Fiesta Bowl)	NBC	L 23–27	72,454	
*Non-conference game; ^{†}Homecoming; Rankings from AP Poll released prior to the game; All times are in Central time

== Roster and coaching staff ==
1985 Nebraska Cornhuskers football team roster
Players
Coaches
Offense

Pos.	#	Name	Class
G		Dan Bailey	So
TE	87	Tom Banderas	So
WB		Vance Behrens	So
QB	12	Clete Blakeman	So
G	70	Brian Blankenship	Sr
WB	33	Dana Brinson	Fr
G	58	Dave Bryan	Jr
OT	73	Todd Carpenter	Jr
FB	24	Dan Casterline	Jr
QB	7	McCathorn Clayton	So
C	54	Mark Cooper	Jr
TE		Mark Diaz	Jr
OT	59	Jim Dittmer	Sr
IB	22	Doug DuBose	Jr
OT	77	Jim Ernest	RFr
TE	80	Todd Frain	Sr
G	67	Ron Galois	Jr
SE	86	Jason Gamble	So
WB		Pernell Gatson	Jr
OT		Derrick Green	So
TE		Mike Hall	So
QB	86	Hendley Hawkins	So
FB	36	Mike Hedlund	So
FB	48	Micah Heibel	So
G	75	Mike Hoefler	Jr
WB		Jim Holscher	So
OT	64	Brad Johnson	Jr
IB	6	Keith Jones	So
FB	49	Ken Kaelin	Jr
IB	40	Jon Kelley	So
SE		Jeff Krantz
C	68	Bill Lewis	Sr
OT	57	Keven Lightner	So
WB	23	Roger Lindstrom	Sr
OT	77	Bill Macias	So
OT	72	Rob Maggard	Jr
G	61	John McCormick	So
IB	21	Paul Miles	Sr
TE	43	Todd Millikan	Fr
QB	16	Jerry Mlinar	Jr
TE	90	Brian Moore	Sr
WB	8	Ray Nelson	Jr
C	63	John Nichols	So
C	56	Jack Noel	Sr
SE		Mike Otte
G	74	Stan Parker	Jr
FB	26	Tom Rathman	Sr
OT	65	Tim Roth	Sr
OT	78	Tim Rother	So
G	62	Jim Schaaf	So
SE	85	Robb Schnitzler	Jr
C	53	Jeff Sellentin	Jr
WB	2	Von Sheppard	So
SE	88	Rod Smith	So
QB	10	Jeff Taylor	So
QB	11	Steve Taylor	Fr
QB	14	Travis Turner	Sr
OT	69	Tom Welter	Jr

Defense

Pos.	#	Name	Class
CB	42	Mike Carl	Jr
S	45	Chris Carr	Jr
CB	28	John Custard	So
LB	46	Chad Daffer	Sr
CB	32	Brian Davis	Jr
LB	48	LeRoy Etienne	Fr
LB	38	Steve Forch	Jr
DE		Paul Gangwish	Sr
DT	52	Danny Groskurth	So
LB	39	Blake Henning	So
S	15	Scott Hill	So
LB	91	Tony Holloway	Jr
DE	55	Jeff Jamrog	So
DT	98	Lee Jones	So
LB	44	Mike Knox	Sr
CB	17	Cleo Miller	Jr
LB	41	Marc Munford	Jr
MG	95	Danny Noonan	Jr
DE		Harlan Opie	So
CB	9	Woody Paige	Sr
DT	97	Tony Palmer	So
LB	35	Kevin Parsons	Jr
CB	18	Brian Pokorny	Sr
MG	34	Todd Proffitt	Sr
DE	84	Gregg Reeves	Sr
DT	93	Rod Reynolds	Sr
MG	66	Phil Rogers	Sr
CB	3	Gary Schneider	Jr
LB	51	Pat Shaw	Jr
LB	99	Ken Shead	Sr
S	19	Bryan Siebler	Jr
DT	96	Jim Skow	Sr
DE	81	Brad Smith	Sr
DT	92	Neil Smith	So
DT	76	Chris Spachman	Jr
S		Matt Strasburger	Jr
S	29	Dan Thayer	Jr
DE	82	Broderick Thomas	Fr
DE	89	Scott Tucker	Sr
DE	83	Brad Tyrer	Jr
CB	27	Dennis Watkins	Sr
LB	37	Doug Welniak	So

Special teams

Pos.	#	Name	Class
MON	31	Gene Chealey	So
PK	1	Dale Klein	Jr
MON	4	Guy Rozier	Sr
P/PK	13	Craig Schnitzler	So
MON	11	Jeff Tomjack	So
MON	43	Brian Washington	So
P/PK	47	Dan Wingard	Sr

Head coach

- Tom Osborne
  13th season
  22nd year at Nebraska
  Alma mater: Nebraska

Coordinators/assistant coaches

- Charlie McBride
  5th season as DC/LB coach
  9th year at Nebraska
  Alma mater: Colorado
- Cletus Fischer
  OL coach
  26th year at Nebraska
  Alma mater: Nebraska
- John Melton
  13th season as LB coach
  24th year at Nebraska
  Alma mater: Wyoming
- Boyd Epley
  17th season as S&C coach
  17th year at Nebraska
  Alma mater: Nebraska
- George Darlington
  DE coach
  13th year at Nebraska
  Alma mater: Rutgers
- Milt Tenopir
  12th season as OL coach
  12th year at Nebraska
  Alma mater: Sterling
- Gene Huey
  9th season as WR coach
  9th year at Nebraska
  Alma mater: Wyoming
- Frank Solich
  3rd season as RB coach
  7th year at Nebraska
  Alma mater: Nebraska
- Jack Pierce
  7th year at Nebraska
- Bob Thornton
  5th season as Sec coach
  5th year at Nebraska
  Alma mater: Nebraska
- Dan Young
  3rd season as OL/K coach
  3rd year at Nebraska
  Alma mater: Reed

Legend

- (C) Team captain
- (S) Suspended
- (I) Ineligible
- Injured
- Redshirt

Roster
Last update: 2011-01-17

=== Depth chart ===
Defense

FS
Bryan Siebler
Chris Carr
Dan Thayer

INSDIE	INSDIE
Marc Munford	Mike Knox
Chad Daffer	Kevin Parsons
LeRoy Etienne	Steve Forch

MONSTER BACK
Brian Washington
Guy Rozier
Jeff Tomjack

CB
Dennis Watkins
Cleo Miller
Brian Pokorny

DE	DT	NT	DT	DE
Brad Smith	Chris Spachman	Danny Noonan	Jim Skow	Scott Tucker
Greg Reeves	Neil Smith	Todd Proffitt	Lee Jones	Tony Holloway
Brad Tyrer	Tony Palmer	Ken Shead; Phil Rogers	Rod Reynolds	Broderick Thomas

CB
Brian Davis
Mike Carl
Gary Schneider

Offense

SE
Robb Schnitzler
Rod Smith
Hendley Hawkins

LT	LG	C	RG	RT
Tim Roth	Brian Blankenship	Bill Lewis	John McCormick	Tom Welter
Brad Johnson	Stan Parker	Mark Cooper	Ron Galois	Rob Maggard
Keven Lightner	Mike Hoefler	Jeff Sellentin	Dan Bailey	Todd Carpenter

TE
Todd Frain
Tom Banderas
Todd Millikan

WB
Von Sheppard
Roger Lindstorm
Dana Brinson

QB
McCathron Clayton
Travis Turner
Steve Taylor
⋅

RB
Doug Dubose
Paul Miles
Keith Jones
Jon Kelley

FB
Tom Rathman
Ken Kaelin
Dan Casterline

Special teams
PK Dale Klein
P Dan Wingard

== Game summaries ==
=== Florida State ===
#17 Florida State at #10 Nebraska [box score]

Team	1	2	3	4	Total
• #17 Florida State	7	10	0	0	17
#10 Nebraska	7	6	0	0	13

- Date: 1985-09-07
- Location: Memorial Stadium, Lincoln, Nebraska
- Game attendance: 75,943

Both teams started out evenly with a 7–7 tie after the first quarter, but Florida State led the Cornhuskers by 4 at the half and no one scored during the rest of this scorcher, as the mercury in Lincoln reached 93 °F (34 °C) and 133 °F (56 °C) on the field. This was the last season opener Nebraska would lose until 2015.

=== Illinois ===
Illinois at #18 Nebraska [box score]

Team	1	2	3	4	Total
Illinois	0	10	0	15	25
• #18 Nebraska	14	10	21	7	52

- Date: 1985-09-21
- Location: Memorial Stadium, Lincoln, Nebraska
- Game attendance: 76,149

Although Illinois started out behind 0–17, they came within 7 points of a tie before Nebraska ran away, as the Cornhuskers at one point scored 28 straight in a game whose outcome never was seriously in doubt.

=== Oregon ===
Oregon at #16 Nebraska [box score]

Team	1	2	3	4	Total
Oregon	0	0	0	0	0
• #16 Nebraska	14	28	14	7	63

- Date: 1985-09-28
- Location: Memorial Stadium, Lincoln, Nebraska
- Game attendance: 75,947

Scoring summary
1	6:08	NEB	Rathman 1-yard run (Klein kick)	NEB 7–0
1	1:04	NEB	Kaelin 3-yard run (Klein kick)	NEB 14–0
2	7:32	NEB	Turner 1-yard run (Klein kick)	NEB 21–0
2	6:28	NEB	Miles 46-yard run (Klein kick)	NEB 28–0
2	3:17	NEB	Jones 25-yard run (Klein kick)	NEB 35–0
2	0:41	NEB	Miles 1-yard run (Klein kick)	NEB 42–0
3	10:58	NEB	Sheppard 8-yard run (Klein kick)	NEB 49–0
3	4:15	NEB	Sheppard 27-yard run (Klein kick)	NEB 56–0
4	9:54	NEB	Casterline 4-yard run (Cheloha kick)	NEB 63–0

Oregon was rendered helpless in Lincoln as Nebraska punched in four touchdowns late in the 2nd quarter and rolled to a 63–0 shutout in Lincoln. The Ducks only crossed the center of the field twice and were unable to scrape up even 1/3 of the total time of possession.

=== New Mexico ===
New Mexico at #13 Nebraska [box score]

Team	1	2	3	4	Total
New Mexico	7	0	0	0	7
• #13 Nebraska	7	7	10	14	38

- Date: 1985-10-05
- Location: Memorial Stadium, Lincoln, Nebraska
- Game attendance: 75,902

Nebraska closed out the non-conference season against a New Mexico team that was not intimidated in Lincoln. The Lobos scored first and acquired 379 total yards of offense while winning the time of possession battle, but could not turn those accomplishments into scores as they also allowed nine sacks, four interceptions and lost a fumble.

=== Oklahoma State ===
#9 Nebraska at #5 Oklahoma State [box score]

Team	1	2	3	4	Total
• #9 Nebraska	0	17	3	14	34
#5 Oklahoma State	0	3	14	7	24

- Date: 1985-10-12
- Location: Lewis Field, Stillwater, Oklahoma
- Game attendance: 50,400

Nebraska pulled off the upset of Oklahoma State in Stillwater, as The Cowboys' passing attack was no match for the Cornhuskers' rushing attack when it was hampered by OSU's two lost fumbles and two thrown interceptions. Nebraska continued their unbeaten streak over Oklahoma State that began in 1961.

=== Missouri ===
#7 Nebraska at Missouri [box score]

Team	1	2	3	4	Total
• #7 Nebraska	6	9	3	10	28
Missouri	7	0	6	7	20

- Date: 1985-10-19
- Location: Faurot Field, Columbia, Missouri
- Game attendance: 62,733

21 of Nebraska's 28 points came off of the foot of PK Dale Klein, who not only tied the NCAA record of seven field goals in a game, but also became the first player to make seven straight in a game while also running his Nebraska field goal record streak up to nine.

=== Colorado ===
Colorado at #5 Nebraska [box score]

Team	1	2	3	4	Total
Colorado	7	0	0	0	7
• #5 Nebraska	0	7	7	3	17

- Date: 1985-10-26
- Location: Memorial Stadium, Lincoln, Nebraska
- Game attendance: 76,014

Scoring summary
1	10:49	COL	Craig Keenan 2-yard run (Larry Eckel kick)	COL 7–0
2	9:21	NEB	Doug DuBose 1-yard run (Dale Klein kick)	Tied 7–7
3	14:37	NEB	Tom Rathman 84-yard run (Dale Klein kick)	NEB 14–7
4	5:26	NEB	Dale Klein 32-yard field goal	NEB 17–7

Colorado, playing without its 1st and 2nd string quarterbacks, still managed to hold Nebraska to a 7–7 halftime tie before a long touchdown run at the end of the 3rd quarter allowed the Cornhuskers to pull away.

=== Kansas State ===
#5 Nebraska at Kansas State [box score]

Team	1	2	3	4	Total
• #5 Nebraska	7	17	3	14	41
Kansas State	3	0	0	0	3

- Date: 1985-11-02
- Location: KSU Stadium, Manhattan, Kansas
- Game attendance: 41,200

Kansas State managed to prevent any single Nebraska runner from exceeding 100 yards, and even though Nebraska only completed six passes, it made no difference as the Wildcats were held to just a 1st-quarter field goal while the Cornhuskers had little trouble putting up 41 points. Nebraska PK Dale Klein set a Nebraska and personal record when he kicked a 50-yard field goal, his 12th of the season.

=== Iowa State ===
Iowa State at #3 Nebraska [box score]

Team	1	2	3	4	Total
Iowa State	0	0	0	0	0
• #3 Nebraska	7	14	21	7	49

- Date: 1985-11-09
- Location: Memorial Stadium, Lincoln, Nebraska
- Game attendance: 75,920

The #3 Cornhuskers romped in Lincoln as the Blackshirts extended their touchdown prevention streak to 11 quarters. Nebraska IB Doug DuBose entered record territory, becoming the 10th Nebraska player to post 2,000 yards, became the third (after Jarvis Redwine and Mike Rozier) to have two 1,000 yard seasons, and was the first Cornhusker to do so before their senior season.

=== Kansas ===
Kansas at #2 Nebraska [box score]

Team	1	2	3	4	Total
Kansas	3	0	3	0	6
• #2 Nebraska	10	28	11	7	56

- Date: 1985-11-16
- Location: Memorial Stadium, Lincoln, Nebraska
- Game attendance: 75,863

Despite a 0–6 turnover margin deficit, #2 Nebraska rolled the Kansas Jayhawks up in a 56–6 drubbing that saw the Cornhusker defense extend their touchdown-free series to 15 quarters. Without the five lost fumbles and one interception given up by Nebraska, the blowout of Kansas would have been far worse.

=== Oklahoma ===
#2 Nebraska at #5 Oklahoma [box score]

Team	1	2	3	4	Total
#2 Nebraska	0	0	0	7	7
• #5 Oklahoma	14	3	10	0	27

- Date: 1985-11-23
- Location: Oklahoma Memorial Stadium, Norman, Oklahoma
- Game start: 2:30 PM CST
- Game attendance: 75,554
- TV announcers (ABC): Keith Jackson, Frank Broyles, and Tim Brant

Scoring summary
1	11:21	OU	Keith Jackson 88-yard run (Tim Lashar kick)	OU 7–0
1	5:52	OU	Jamelle Holieway 43-yard run (Lashar kick)	OU 14–0
2	1:18	OU	Lashar 37-yard field goal	OU 17–0
3	9:19	OU	Lashar 33-yard field goal	OU 20–0
3	2:26	OU	Holieway 17-yard run (Lashar kick)	OU 27–0
4	0:26	NEB	Chris Spachman 76-yard fumble return (Klein kick)	OU 27–7

Oklahoma completely shut down Nebraska's offensive machine, as the Cornhuskers' only score came on a 76-yard fumble return for a touchdown with just 26 seconds left to play, very narrowly avoiding what would have been Nebraska's first shutout in 147 games. There were only 19 total passes and 5 completions in the entire game, and although Nebraska had not previously allowed more than 157 ground yards this season, the vaunted Oklahoma wishbone attack netted the Sooners 423 yards.

=== Michigan ===
#7 Nebraska vs #5 Michigan [box score]

Team	1	2	3	4	Total
#7 Nebraska	0	14	0	9	23
• #5 Michigan	3	0	24	0	27

- Date: 1986-01-01
- Location: Sun Devil Stadium, Tempe, Arizona
- Game attendance: 72,454

Although Nebraska led 14–3 going into halftime, turnover-free Michigan cashed in on each of several Cornhusker mistakes in the third quarter to run off 24 points and pull away, handing Nebraska its second consecutive defeat to a #5 team.

== Rankings ==
Ranking movements Legend: ██ Increase in ranking ██ Decrease in ranking
	Week																
Poll	Pre	1	2	3	4	5	6	7	8	9	10	11	12	13	14	15	Final
AP	9	10	18	18	16	13	9	7	5	5	3	2	2	8	7	7	11
Coaches	4	4	14	17	14	10	9	6	3	3	2	2	2	8	6	6	10

== After the season ==
=== Awards ===
Award	Name(s)
All-America 1st team	Bill Lewis, Jim Skow
All-America 2nd team	Doug DuBose
All-America 3rd team	Tom Rathman
All-America honorable mention	Tim Roth, Brian Blankenship
All-Big 8 1st team	Brian Blankenship, Bill Lewis, Doug DuBose, Tom Rathman, Dale Klein, Jim Skow
All-Big 8 2nd team	Danny Noonan, Brian Washington, Tim Roth, Dan Wingard, Chris Spachman, Marc Munford

=== NFL and pro players ===
The following Nebraska players who participated in the 1985 season later moved on to the next level and joined a professional team as draftees or free agents.

Name	Team
Brian Blankenship	Pittsburgh Steelers
Dana Brinson	San Diego Chargers
Brian Davis	Washington Redskins
Doug DuBose	San Francisco 49ers
LeRoy Etienne	San Francisco 49ers
Todd Frain	Washington Redskins
Keith Jones	Cleveland Browns
Mike Knox	Denver Broncos
Bill Lewis	Los Angeles Raiders
Paul Miles	Tampa Bay Buccaneers
Marc Munford	Denver Broncos
Danny Noonan	Dallas Cowboys
Tom Rathman	San Francisco 49ers
Tim Rother	Los Angeles Raiders
Von Sheppard	Coventry Jets
Jim Skow	Cincinnati Bengals
Neil Smith	Kansas City Chiefs
Steve Taylor	Edmonton Eskimos
Broderick Thomas	Tampa Bay Buccaneers
Brian Washington	Cleveland Browns
Dennis Watkins	Philadelphia Eagles
Tom Welter	St. Louis Cardinals
