= 1985 Missouri Tigers football team =

American college football season

1985 Missouri Tigers football
- Conference: Big Eight Conference
- Record: 1–10 (1–6 Big 8)
- Head coach: Woody Widenhofer (1st season)
- Offensive coordinator: Bill Meyers (1st season)
- Defensive coordinator: James McKinley (1st season)
- Home stadium: Faurot Field

1985 Big Eight Conference football standings
	Conf.					Overall
Team	W		L		T	W		L		T
No. 1 Oklahoma $	7	–	0	–	0	11	–	1	–	0
No. 11 Nebraska	6	–	1	–	0	9	–	3	–	0
Oklahoma State	4	–	3	–	0	8	–	4	–	0
Colorado	4	–	3	–	0	7	–	5	–	0
Iowa State	3	–	4	–	0	5	–	6	–	0
Kansas	2	–	5	–	0	6	–	6	–	0
Kansas State	1	–	6	–	0	1	–	10	–	0
Missouri	1	–	6	–	0	1	–	10	–	0
$ – Conference champion; Rankings from AP Poll

The 1985 Missouri Tigers football team was an American football team that represented the University of Missouri in the Big Eight Conference (Big 8) during the 1985 NCAA Division I-A football season. The team compiled a 1–10 record (1–6 against Big 8 opponents), finished in a tie for last place in the Big 8, and was outscored by opponents by a combined total of 342 to 206. Woody Widenhofer was the head coach for the first of four seasons. The team played its home games at Faurot Field in Columbia, Missouri.

The team's statistical leaders included Darrell Wallace with 1,120 rushing yards, Marlon Adler with 1,258 passing yards, and Herbert Johnson with 806 receiving yards.

== Schedule ==
Date	Opponent	Site	Result	Attendance	Source
September 14	Northwestern*	Faurot Field; Columbia, MO	L 23–27	46,015	
September 21	at Texas*	Texas Memorial Stadium; Austin, TX	L 17–21	76,437	
September 28	Indiana*	Faurot Field; Columbia, MO	L 17–36	46,763	
October 5	California*^{†}	Faurot Field; Columbia, MO	L 32–39	46,851	
October 12	at Colorado	Folsom Field; Boulder, CO	L 7–38	38,604	
October 19	No. 7 Nebraska	Faurot Field; Columbia, MO (rivalry)	L 20–28	62,733	
October 26	Kansas State	Faurot Field; Columbia, MO	L 17–20	40,221	
November 2	at Iowa State	Cyclone Stadium; Ames, IA (rivalry)	W 28–27	40,015	
November 9	No. 7 Oklahoma	Faurot Field; Columbia, MO (rivalry)	L 6–51	50,321	
November 16	No. 10 Oklahoma State	Faurot Field; Columbia, MO	L 19–21	36,993	
November 23	at Kansas	Memorial Stadium; Lawrence, KS (Border War)	L 20–34	22,000	
*Non-conference game; ^{†}Homecoming; Rankings from AP Poll released prior to the game
