= 1985 Kansas Jayhawks football team =

American college football season

1985 Kansas Jayhawks football
- Conference: Big Eight Conference
- Record: 6–6 (2–5 Big 8)
- Head coach: Mike Gottfried (3rd season)
- Captains: Sylvester Byrd; Skip Peete; Willie Pless; Mike Norseth
- Home stadium: Memorial Stadium

1985 Big Eight Conference football standings
	Conf.					Overall
Team	W		L		T	W		L		T
No. 1 Oklahoma $	7	–	0	–	0	11	–	1	–	0
No. 11 Nebraska	6	–	1	–	0	9	–	3	–	0
Oklahoma State	4	–	3	–	0	8	–	4	–	0
Colorado	4	–	3	–	0	7	–	5	–	0
Iowa State	3	–	4	–	0	5	–	6	–	0
Kansas	2	–	5	–	0	6	–	6	–	0
Kansas State	1	–	6	–	0	1	–	10	–	0
Missouri	1	–	6	–	0	1	–	10	–	0
$ – Conference champion; Rankings from AP Poll

The 1985 Kansas Jayhawks football team represented the University of Kansas in the Big Eight Conference during the 1985 NCAA Division I-A football season. In their third and final season under head coach Mike Gottfried, the Jayhawks compiled a 6–6 record (2–5 against conference opponents), finished in sixth place in the conference, and outscored their opponents by a combined total of 294 to 281. They played their home games at Memorial Stadium in Lawrence, Kansas.

The team's statistical leaders included Mike Norseth with 2,995 passing yards, Lynn Williams with 373 rushing yards, and Richard Estell with 1,109 receiving yards. Sylvester Byrd, Skip Peete, Willie Pless, and Mike Norseth were the team captains.

== Schedule ==
Date	Opponent	Site	Result	Attendance	Source
August 31	at Hawaii*	Aloha Stadium; Halawa, HI	W 33–27	46,626	
September 14	Vanderbilt*	Memorial Stadium; Lawrence, KS	W 42–16	39,000	
September 21	Indiana State*	Memorial Stadium; Lawrence, KS	W 37–10	38,500	
September 28	at No. 4 Florida State*	Doak Campbell Stadium; Tallahassee, FL	L 20–24	57,135	
October 5	Eastern Illinois*	Memorial Stadium; Lawrence, KS	W 44–20	37,500	
October 12	at Iowa State	Cyclone Stadium; Ames, IA	L 21–22	43,117	
October 19	Kansas State	Memorial Stadium; Lawrence, KS (rivalry)	W 38–7	40,000	
October 26	No. 12 Oklahoma State	Memorial Stadium; Lawrence, KS	L 10–17	35,200	
November 2	at No. 9 Oklahoma	Oklahoma Memorial Stadium; Norman, OK	L 6–48	75,008	
November 9	Colorado^{†}	Memorial Stadium; Lawrence, KS	L 3–14	25,000	
November 16	at No. 2 Nebraska	Memorial Stadium; Lincoln, NE (rivalry)	L 6–56	75,863	
November 23	Missouri	Memorial Stadium; Lawrence, KS (Border War)	W 34–20	22,000	
*Non-conference game; ^{†}Homecoming; Rankings from AP Poll released prior to the game

== Roster ==
1985 Kansas Jayhawks football team roster
Players
Coaches
Offense

Pos.	#	Name	Class
QB	7	Mike Norseth	Sr
TE	80	Sylvester Byrd	Sr

Defense

Pos.	#	Name	Class
DT	92	Steve Nave	Jr

Special teams

Pos.	#	Name	Class

Head coach

- Don Fambrough

Coordinators/assistant coaches

Legend

- (C) Team captain
- (S) Suspended
- (I) Ineligible
- Injured
- Redshirt
