= 1985 Colorado Buffaloes football team =

American college football season

1985 Colorado Buffaloes football

Freedom Bowl, L 17–20 vs. Washington
- Conference: Big Eight Conference
- Record: 7–5 (4–3 Big 8)
- Head coach: Bill McCartney (4th season)
- Offensive coordinator: Gerry DiNardo (2nd season)
- Offensive scheme: Wishbone
- Defensive coordinator: Lou Tepper (3rd season)
- Base defense: 3–4
- MVP: Dan McMillen
- Captains: Junior Ili; Barry Remington
- Home stadium: Folsom Field

1985 Big Eight Conference football standings
| | Conf. | | | | | Overall |
| Team | W | | L | | T | W | | L | | T |
|---|---|---|---|---|---|---|---|---|---|---|
| No. 1 Oklahoma $ | 7 | – | 0 | – | 0 | 11 | – | 1 | – | 0 |
| No. 11 Nebraska | 6 | – | 1 | – | 0 | 9 | – | 3 | – | 0 |
| Oklahoma State | 4 | – | 3 | – | 0 | 8 | – | 4 | – | 0 |
| Colorado | 4 | – | 3 | – | 0 | 7 | – | 5 | – | 0 |
| Iowa State | 3 | – | 4 | – | 0 | 5 | – | 6 | – | 0 |
| Kansas | 2 | – | 5 | – | 0 | 6 | – | 6 | – | 0 |
| Kansas State | 1 | – | 6 | – | 0 | 1 | – | 10 | – | 0 |
| Missouri | 1 | – | 6 | – | 0 | 1 | – | 10 | – | 0 |
$ – Conference champion; Rankings from AP Poll

The 1985 Colorado Buffaloes football team represented the University of Colorado in the Big Eight Conference during the 1985 NCAA Division I-A football season. Led by fourth-year head coach Bill McCartney, the Buffaloes switched to a wishbone offense and finished the regular season at 7–4 (4–3 in Big 8, tied for third). Home games were played on campus at Folsom Field in Boulder, Colorado.

Colorado, 1–10 the previous season, won five of its first six games, earned its first bowl invitation in nine years, and won the NCAA Most Improved Team Award. In a competitive Freedom Bowl in late December, CU fell to the favored Washington Huskies by three points in Anaheim; both teams finished at 7–5.

== Schedule ==
| Date | Opponent | Site | TV | Result | Attendance | Source |
|---|---|---|---|---|---|---|
| September 7 | Colorado State* | Folsom Field; Boulder, CO (Rocky Mountain Showdown) | KCNC | W 23–10 | 40,665 | |
| September 14 | Oregon* | Folsom Field; Boulder, CO | | W 21–17 | 30,373 | |
| September 21 | No. 7 Ohio State* | Folsom Field; Boulder, CO | | L 13–36 | 47,022 | |
| September 28 | at Arizona* | Arizona Stadium; Tucson, AZ | | W 14–13 | 45,503 | |
| October 12 | Missouri^{†} | Folsom Field; Boulder, CO | | W 38–7 | 38,604 | |
| October 19 | at Iowa State | Cyclone Stadium; Ames, IA | | W 40–6 | 41,215 | |
| October 26 | at No. 5 Nebraska | Memorial Stadium; Lincoln, NE (rivalry) | ABC | L 7–17 | 76,014 | |
| November 2 | No. 12 Oklahoma State | Folsom Field; Boulder, CO | Raycom | L 11–14 | 35,860 | |
| November 9 | at Kansas | Memorial Stadium; Lawrence KS | | W 14–3 | 25,000 | |
| November 16 | at No. 7 Oklahoma | Oklahoma Memorial Stadium; Norman, OK | | L 0–31 | 74,145 | |
| November 23 | Kansas State | Folsom Field; Boulder, CO (rivalry) | KCNC | W 30–0 | 28,210 | |
| December 30 | vs. Washington* | Anaheim Stadium; Anaheim, CA (Freedom Bowl) | Lorimar | L 17–20 | 30,961 | |
*Non-conference game; ^{†}Homecoming; Rankings from AP Poll released prior to the game

== Game summaries ==
=== Kansas ===
| | 1 | 2 | 3 | 4 | Total |
|---|---|---|---|---|---|
| Colorado | 7 | 0 | 0 | 7 | 14 |
| Kansas | 0 | 3 | 0 | 0 | 3 |

- COL - Mickey Pruitt 27-yard interception return (Larry Eckel kick)
- KAN - Jeff Johnson 36-yard field goal
- COL - Mark Hatcher 5-yard run (Eckel kick)

Attendance: 25,000

Passing: COL Mark Hatcher 1/6, 11 yds; KAN Mike Norseth 22/41, 256 yds, INT
Rushing: COL Anthony Weatherspoon 16–65; KAN Harvey Fields 7–24
Receiving: COL Sam Smith 1–11; KAN Richard Estell 8–126

== Roster ==
1985 Colorado Buffaloes football team roster
Players
Coaches
Offense

| Pos. | # | Name | Class |
|---|---|---|---|
| SE | 5 | Loy Alexander | Sr |
| HB | 8 | Ron Brown | Sr |
| SE | 16 | Jo Jo Collins | So |
| TE | 80 | Jon Embree | Jr |
| SE, QB | 25 | Drew Ferrando | So |
| QB | 6 | Mark Hatcher | So |
| G | 63 | Junior Ili (C) | Sr |
| QB | 14 | Craig Keenan | Sr |
| HB | 20 | Mike Marquez | So |
| HB | 42 | Dave Sanders | Fr |
| HB | 34 | Sam Smith | So |
| FB | 44 | Anthony Weatherspoon | So |

Defense

| Pos. | # | Name | Class |
|---|---|---|---|
| LB | 49 | Don DeLuzio | So |
| DE | 50 | Dan McMillen | Sr |
| SS | 19 | Mickey Pruitt | So |
| LB | 40 | Barry Remington (C) | Jr |

Special teams

| Pos. | # | Name | Class |
|---|---|---|---|
| K | 18 | Larry Eckel | Sr |
| P | 9 | Barry Helton | So |

Head coach

- Bill McCartney (4th year)

Coordinators/assistant coaches

- Gerry DiNardo (OC)
- Lou Tepper (DC)
- Jeff Bleamer (OL)

Legend

- (C) Team captain
- (S) Suspended
- (I) Ineligible
- Injured
- Redshirt

Roster
