= 1985 Kansas State Wildcats football team =

American college football season

1985 Kansas State Wildcats football
- Conference: Big Eight Conference
- Record: 1–10 (1–6 Big 8)
- Head coach: Jim Dickey (8th season; first 2 games); Lee Moon (interim; final 9 games)
- Offensive coordinator: Al Sandahl (1st season)
- Home stadium: KSU Stadium

1985 Big Eight Conference football standings
	Conf.					Overall
Team	W		L		T	W		L		T
No. 1 Oklahoma $	7	–	0	–	0	11	–	1	–	0
No. 11 Nebraska	6	–	1	–	0	9	–	3	–	0
Oklahoma State	4	–	3	–	0	8	–	4	–	0
Colorado	4	–	3	–	0	7	–	5	–	0
Iowa State	3	–	4	–	0	5	–	6	–	0
Kansas	2	–	5	–	0	6	–	6	–	0
Kansas State	1	–	6	–	0	1	–	10	–	0
Missouri	1	–	6	–	0	1	–	10	–	0
$ – Conference champion; Rankings from AP Poll

The 1985 Kansas State Wildcats football team represented Kansas State University in the 1985 NCAA Division I-A football season. Eighth-year head coach Jim Dickey was forced to resign after opening the season with two consecutive losses including one to an NCAA Division I-AA team. Assistant athletic director Lee Moon took over as interim coach for the rest of the season. The Wildcats played their home games in KSU Stadium. They finished with a record of 1–10 overall and a 1–6 in Big Eight Conference play.

== Schedule ==
Date	Opponent	Site	Result	Attendance	Source
September 7	Wichita State*	KSU Stadium; Manhattan, KS	L 10–16	30,300	
September 14	Northern Iowa*	KSU Stadium; Manhattan, KS	L 6–10	17,550	
September 21	TCU*	KSU Stadium; Manhattan, KS	L 21–24	15,500	
September 28	North Texas State*	KSU Stadium; Manhattan, KS	L 10–22	22,000	
October 5	No. 2 Oklahoma^{†}	KSU Stadium; Manhattan, KS	L 6–41	23,500	
October 19	at Kansas	Memorial Stadium; Lawrence, KS (rivalry)	L 7–38	40,000	
October 26	at Missouri	Faurot Field; Columbia, MO	W 20–17	40,221	
November 2	No. 5 Nebraska	KSU Stadium; Manhattan, KS (rivalry)	L 3–41	41,200	
November 9	at No. 10 Oklahoma State	Lewis Field; Stillwater, OK	L 3–35	50,000	
November 16	Iowa State	KSU Stadium; Manhattan, KS (rivalry)	L 14–21	17,500	
November 23	at Colorado	Folsom Field; Boulder, CO (rivalry)	L 0–30	28,210	
*Non-conference game; ^{†}Homecoming; Rankings from AP Poll released prior to the game

== Game summaries ==
=== Oklahoma ===
#2 Oklahoma Sooners at Kansas State Wildcats

Team	1	2	3	4	Total
• No. 2 Sooners	0	14	13	14	41
Wildcats	0	0	6	0	6

- Date: October 5
- Location: KSU Stadium
- Game attendance: 23,500

	OU	KSU
First Downs	30	6
Rushing yards	76–353	25–21
Passing	10–14–1	13–26–3
Passing yards	177	100
Total Offense	530	121
Fumbles Lost	3	0
Penalties	10–74	7–64
Time of Possession	37:27	22:33

=== Nebraska ===
#5 Nebraska at Kansas State [box score]

Team	1	2	3	4	Total
• #5 Nebraska	7	17	3	14	41
Kansas State	3	0	0	0	3

- Date: 1985-11-02
- Location: KSU Stadium, Manhattan, Kansas
- Game attendance: 41,200

Kansas State managed to prevent any single Nebraska runner from exceeding 100 yards, and even though Nebraska only completed six passes, it made no difference as the Wildcats were held to just a 1st-quarter field goal while the Cornhuskers had little trouble putting up 41 points. Nebraska PK Dale Klein set a Nebraska and personal record when he kicked a 50-yard field goal, his 12th of the season.

== Roster ==
1985 Kansas State Wildcats football team roster
Players
Coaches
Offense

Pos.	#	Name	Class
WR	86	Gerald Alphin	Sr
QB	12	Keith Barenberg	Fr
G	63	Bob Bessert	Jr
TE	80	Kent Dean	So
OT	74	Rocky Dvorak	Jr
G	50	Andy Harding	Sr
RB	29	Tony Jordan	So
RB	36	John Kendrick	Sr
QB	11	Steve Mallory	Fr
RB	27	Todd Moody	Jr
C	51	Chuck Sander	Jr
QB	10	Todd Sandahl	Fr
OT	71	Tim Stone	Sr
FB	32	Greg Strahm	Sr
QB	7	John Welch	Jr
QB	5	Randy Williams	So
WR	46	Dick Warren	Sr
WR	30	James Witherspoon	Sr
WR	88	Jay Wade	Fr
FB	24	Ray Wilson	So

Defense

Pos.	#	Name	Class
CB	17	David Ast	Sr
LB	47	Dwayne Castille	So
SS	26	Jack Epps	Sr
FS	13	Pat Hill	Sr
DT	98	Kevin Humphrey	Sr
DT	93	Jeff Hurd	Jr
DB	4	Brad Lambert	So
LB	58	Tim MacDonald	So
DT	77	Les Miller	Jr
DL	99	Renneth Reed	Sr
FS	15	Andy Schrag	Fr
SS	33	Scott Wentzel	Sr
LB	57	Scott White	So

Special teams

Pos.	#	Name	Class
P	14	Matt Jacobs	Jr
K	1	Mark Porter	Fr

Head coach

- Jim Dickey

Coordinators/assistant coaches

Legend

- (C) Team captain
- (S) Suspended
- (I) Ineligible
- Injured
- Redshirt
