= 1985 Oklahoma Sooners football team =

American college football season

1985 Oklahoma Sooners football

Consensus national champion Big 8 champion Orange Bowl champion

Orange Bowl, W 25–10 vs. Penn State
- Conference: Big Eight Conference

Ranking
- Coaches: No. 1
- AP: No. 1
- Record: 11–1 (7–0 Big 8)
- Head coach: Barry Switzer (13th season)
- Offensive coordinator: Jim Donnan (1st season)
- Offensive scheme: Wishbone
- Defensive coordinator: Gary Gibbs (5th season)
- Base defense: 5–2
- Captains: Tony Casillas; Kevin Murphy; Eric Pope
- Home stadium: Oklahoma Memorial Stadium

1985 Big Eight Conference football standings
	Conf.					Overall
Team	W		L		T	W		L		T
No. 1 Oklahoma $	7	–	0	–	0	11	–	1	–	0
No. 11 Nebraska	6	–	1	–	0	9	–	3	–	0
Oklahoma State	4	–	3	–	0	8	–	4	–	0
Colorado	4	–	3	–	0	7	–	5	–	0
Iowa State	3	–	4	–	0	5	–	6	–	0
Kansas	2	–	5	–	0	6	–	6	–	0
Kansas State	1	–	6	–	0	1	–	10	–	0
Missouri	1	–	6	–	0	1	–	10	–	0
$ – Conference champion; Rankings from AP Poll

The 1985 Oklahoma Sooners football team represented the University of Oklahoma in the 1985 NCAA Division I-A football season. This year was Barry Switzer's 13th season as head coach. The Sooners ended this season with 11 wins and a sole loss coming to the Miami Hurricanes in Norman, in a game in which the Sooners lost starting quarterback Troy Aikman for the season. The Sooners were forced to place their trust in freshman quarterback Jamelle Holieway and a physical defense featuring three All-Americans, who led them to a Big 8 Conference title and a national championship. This was Oklahoma's sixth national championship and 34th conference championship in school history.

== Schedule ==
Date	Time	Opponent	Rank	Site	TV	Result	Attendance	Source
September 28	7:00 p.m.	at Minnesota*	No. 2	Hubert H. Humphrey Metrodome; Minneapolis, MN	TBS	W 13–7	62,446	
October 5	11:30 a.m.	at Kansas State	No. 2	KSU Stadium; Manhattan, KS	Raycom	W 41–6	23,500	
October 12	12:00 p.m.	vs. No. 17 Texas*	No. 2	Cotton Bowl; Dallas, TX (Red River Shootout)	ABC	W 14–7	75,587	
October 19	2:30 p.m.	Miami (FL)*	No. 3	Oklahoma Memorial Stadium; Norman, OK	ABC	L 14–27	73,102	
October 26	1:30 p.m.	Iowa State	No. 10	Oklahoma Memorial Stadium; Norman, OK		W 59–14	74,207	
November 2	1:30 p.m.	Kansas	No. 9	Oklahoma Memorial Stadium; Norman, OK		W 48–6	75,008	
November 9	11:30 a.m.	at Missouri	No. 7	Faurot Field; Columbia, MO (rivalry)	HSE	W 51–6	50,321	
November 16	1:30 p.m.	Colorado^{†}	No. 7	Oklahoma Memorial Stadium; Norman, OK		W 31–0	74,145	
November 23	2:30 p.m.	No. 2 Nebraska	No. 5	Oklahoma Memorial Stadium; Norman, OK (rivalry)	ABC	W 27–7	75,554	
November 30	6:30 p.m.	at No. 17 Oklahoma State	No. 3	Lewis Field; Stillwater, OK (Bedlam)	ESPN	W 13–0	44,000	
December 7	2:30 p.m.	SMU*	No. 4	Oklahoma Memorial Stadium; Norman, OK	ABC	W 35–13	73,284	
January 1, 1986	7:00 p.m.	vs. No. 1 Penn State*	No. 3	Miami Orange Bowl; Miami, FL (Orange Bowl)	NBC	W 25–10	74,148	
*Non-conference game; ^{†}Homecoming; Rankings from AP Poll released prior to the game; All times are in Central time; Source:

== Roster ==
Quarterbacks: 18 Troy Aikman^{†} – Sophomore; 4 Jamelle Holieway^{†} – Freshman; 16 Kyle Irvin – Sophomore; 1 Eric Mitchel – Freshman; 9 Glen Sullivan – Sophomore; Running backs: 28 Rotnei Anderson FB – (redshirt) Freshman; 45 Lydell Carr^{†} FB – Sophomore; 43 Chris Howard FB – (redshirt) Freshman; 5 Earl Johnson FB – Junior; 84 Chris Youman FB – Freshman; 35 Eric Bross – Freshman; 33 Patrick Collins^{†} – Sophomore; 28 Ron Counter – Sophomore; 23 Don Maloney – (redshirt) Freshman; 22 Gregg Nesbitt – Sophomore; 2 Leon Perry^{†} – Freshman; 38 Chris Richards – (redshirt) Freshman; 27 Damon Stell – Sophomore; 20 Spencer Tillman^{†} – Junior; 26 Mark White – Freshman; 82 Greg Dixon – Freshman; 13 Dion Wharry – Freshman; 30 Robert Stanley^{†} – Sophomore; Receivers: 15 Derrick Crudup – Sophomore; 87 Paul Rodgers – Freshman; 3 Derrick Shepard^{†} – Junior; 24 Don Smitherman – Freshman; 25 Anthony Stafford^{†} – Freshman; Lee Morris – Sophomore; Carl Cabbiness – Freshman; 83 Jeff Jones – Freshman; Tight ends: 85 Darin Berryhill – Senior; 88 Keith Jackson^{†} – Sophomore; 97 Aubrey King – (redshirt) Freshman; 89 Terry Pritchard – Freshman; 67 David Frolich – Freshman; 81 David Shoemaker – Freshman; Lance Price – Sophomore	Offensive line: 74 W. Bennett G – (redshirt) Freshman; 62 Al Laurita G – Sophomore; 71 Jeff Pickett G – Junior; 63 Eric Pope^{†‡} G – Senior; 73 Scott Harrison L – (redshirt) Freshman; 72 Dugan Forrest T – Freshman; 58 Mickey Greene T – (redshirt) Freshman; 79 Mark Hutson^{†} T – Sophomore; 73 Chuck Johnson C – (redshirt) Freshman; 75 Greg Johnson T – Sophomore; 70 Richard Marks T – Sophomore; 68 Anthony Phillips^{†} T – (redshirt) Freshman; 77 Caesar Rentie T – Sophomore; 76 Mark Van Keirsbilck T – Freshman; 65 Mike Wise L – Freshman; 57 Kevin Adkins C – Junior; 78 Daniel Blackwood C – Sophomore; 53 Travis Simpson C – Junior; 52 Ric Uhles C – Senior; 59 Greg Williams C – Freshman; 55 Paul Ferrer^{†} C/G – Senior; Defensive line: 92 Tony Casillas^{†‡} NG – Senior; 51 Richard Davis NG – (redshirt) Freshman; 93 Curtice Williams NG – (redshirt) Freshman; 69 Andre Williams L – Freshman; 98 Dante Williams L – Freshman; 61 Mike Aljoe E – Junior; 47 Jeff Hake E – Junior; 80 Troy Johnson E – Sophomore; 46 Kert Kaspar E – Sophomore; 60 Mike Mantle E – Junior; 39 Kevin Murphy^{†‡} E – Senior; 40 Darrell Reed E – Sophomore; 95 Jodie Britt T – Sophomore; 86 Steve Bryan T – Junior; 90 Darren Kilpatrick T – Sophomore; 56 Bob Latham^{†} T – (redshirt) Freshman; 66 Jon Phillips T – Sophomore; 96 Richard Reed T – Junior; 78 Jeff Tupper T – Senior; 99 Tony Woods T – (redshirt) Freshman	Linebackers: 44 Brian Bosworth^{†} – Sophomore; 41 Tony Sebo – Freshman; 54 Evan Gatewood – Junior; 50 Dante Jones^{†} – Sophomore; 43 Frederick McDonald injured resv."Sophomore"; 48 Brad McBride – Sophomore; 42 Paul Migliazzo^{†} – Junior; Defensive backs: 8 Sonny Brown^{†} – Junior; 29 Rickey Dixon^{†} – Sophomore; 9 Lonnie Finch – Freshman; 49 Scott Garl – (redshirt) Freshman; 7 Ledell Glenn – Junior; 32 Percy Hines – Junior; 6 Andre Johnson – Sophomore; 36 Steve Jones – (redshirt) Freshman; 17 Ken McMichel – Freshman; 35 Tony Rayburn^{†} – Junior; 21 Carlos Scott – Freshman; 37 Todd Smith – Junior; 11 Leonard Thomas – Freshman; 22 Kevin Thompson – Freshman; 19 Scott Thompson – Freshman; 10 David Vickers^{†} – Sophomore; 14 Derrick White – (redshirt) Freshman; Kickers: 31 Tim Lashar^{†} – Junior; 91 Todd Thomsen – Freshman; 26 Darren Atyia P – Sophomore; 12 Mike Winchester P^{†} – Junior
† Starter at position ‡ Team Captain * Injured; did not play in 1985. Courtesy of Soonerstats.com

== Rankings ==
Ranking movements Legend: ██ Increase in ranking ██ Decrease in ranking ( ) = First-place votes
	Week																
Poll	Pre	1	2	3	4	5	6	7	8	9	10	11	12	13	14	15	Final
AP	1 (23)	1	2 (28)	2 (23)	2 (21)	2 (13)	2 ()	3 (12)	10	9	7 (1)	7 ()	5 (2)	3 (6)	4 (5)	3 (5)	1 (55)
Coaches	1 (14)	1 (14)	1 (18)	2 ()	2 (8)	2 (14)	2 (14)	2 (14)	10	8	5	6	3	2 (2)	2 (2)	2 (1)	1 (41)

== Game summaries ==
After losing the 1985 Orange Bowl to the Washington Huskies and letting any National Championship aspirations for that year disappear (and be awarded to the BYU Cougars, the nation's only undefeated college football team that year), the defending Big 8 Champion Sooners came into the 1985 season on a mission. Led by a defense (which later drew comparisons to their NFL counterpart Chicago Bears) and quarterback sophomore Troy Aikman, the Sooners seemed poised for a run at the Orange Bowl and the National Championship.

Nothing seemed to indicate otherwise, as the Sooners rolled past Minnesota and Kansas State before beating the Longhorns in the annual Red River Shootout.

=== at Minnesota ===
#2 Oklahoma Sooners at Minnesota Golden Gophers

Team	1	2	3	4	Total
• No. 2 Sooners	3	7	0	3	13
Golden Gophers	0	0	0	7	7

- Date: September 28
- Location: Hubert H. Humphrey Metrodome

Scoring summary
1	OU	Lashar 21-yard field goal	OU 3-0
2	OU	E. Johnson 1-yard run (Lashar kick)	OU 10-0
4	OU	Lashar 21-yard field goal	OU 13-0
4	MIN	Starks 12-yard pass from Foggie (Lohmiller kick)	OU 13-7

	OU	MINN
First downs	21	6
Rushing yards	64–254	25–57
Passing	7–17–0	8–20–0
Passing yards	67	121
Total Offense	321	178
Fumbles Lost	1	0
Penalties	6–35	5–35
Time of Possession	40:54	19:06

=== at Kansas State ===
#2 Oklahoma Sooners at Kansas State Wildcats

Team	1	2	3	4	Total
• No. 2 Sooners	0	14	13	14	41
Wildcats	0	0	6	0	6

- Date: October 5
- Location: KSU Stadium
- Game attendance: 23,500

	OU	KSU
First downs	30	6
Rushing yards	76–353	25–21
Passing	10–14–1	13–26–3
Passing yards	177	100
Total Offense	530	121
Fumbles Lost	3	0
Penalties	10–74	7–64
Time of Possession	37:27	22:33

=== vs. No. 17 Texas (Red River Shootout) ===
#17 Texas Longhorns vs. #2 Oklahoma Sooners

Team	1	2	3	4	Total
No. 17 Longhorns	7	0	0	0	7
• No. 2 Sooners	0	7	0	7	14

- Date: October 12
- Location: Cotton Bowl, Dallas
- Game attendance: 75,587

Scoring summary
1		TEX	Kip Cooper 7-yard fumble return (Jeffrey Ward kick)	TEX 7-0
2	10:18	OU	Lydell Carr 1-yard run (Tim Lashar kick)	Tied 7-7
4	12:25	OU	Patrick Collins 45-yard run (Tim Lashar kick)	OU 14-7

The Sooners' offense didn't have a banner day in the 80th edition of the Red River Rivalry although they still rolled up 220 yards rushing and Troy Aikman completed four of nine passes for 67 yards. Lydell Carr led all rushers with 80 yards on 23 carries, and Patrick Collins added 61 yards on four carries. Keith Jackson had 49 yards on his two receptions.

On the game's third play, Oklahoma's All-American nose guard Tony Casillas went down with a sprained right knee. The Oklahoma defense, even without Casillas, manhandled Texas. The Sooners held the Longhorns to just 70 yards in total offense, 17 on the ground for an average of less than half a yard per their 35 carries, and just four first downs. They got into Oklahoma territory only three times, twice to the 49-yard line and once to the 46, and one of those trips was thanks to another fumble. In addition, the Sooners picked off three passes, and Texas was held to no first downs in the second half. Brian Bosworth finished the game with 14 tackles, 11 of them unassisted, and a leaping interception of quarterback Todd Dodge.

	Texas	OU
First downs	4	14
Rushing yards	35–17	66–220
Passing	4–15–3	4–9–0
Passing yards	53	67
Total Offense	70	287
Fumbles Lost	0	2
Penalties	5–30	3–20
Time of Possession	24:44	35:16

=== Miami (FL) ===
Miami Hurricanes at #3 Oklahoma Sooners

Team	1	2	3	4	Total
• Hurricanes	7	7	13	0	27
No. 3 Sooners	7	0	0	7	14

- Date: October 19
- Location: Oklahoma Memorial Stadium
- Game attendance: 73,102
- Game weather: Overcast
- TV announcers (ABC): Keith Jackson, Frank Broyles, and Tim Brant

Scoring summary
1	8:44	Miami (FL)	Michael Irvin 56-yard pass from Vinny Testaverde (Greg Cox kick)	Miami (FL) 7-0
1	6:34	OU	Derrick Shepard 14-yard pass from Troy Aikman (Tim Lashar kick)	Tied 7-7
2	14:16	Miami (FL)	Testaverde 3-yard run (Cox kick)	Miami (FL) 14-7
3	8:49	Miami (FL)	Cox 20-yard field goal	Miami (FL) 17-7
3	4:06	Miami (FL)	Brian Blades 35-yard pass from Testaverde (Cox kick)	Miami (FL) 24-7
3	2:34	Miami (FL)	Cox 36-yard field goal	Miami (FL) 27-7
4	10:28	OU	Lydell Carr 1-yard run (Lashar kick)	Miami (FL) 27-14

The third-ranked Sooners (3-0) returned home to play their first game in Norman, hosting unranked Miami (4-1). The game made local headlines as a homecoming for Hurricanes coach Jimmy Johnson who was an Oklahoma defensive line coach with Switzer from '70-'72 and went 0-5 against the Sooners as the Oklahoma State head coach.

Oklahoma came into the contest with the nation's most aggressive defense (leading to their comparisons to the Monsters of the Midway), which seemingly got better each week, and was led up front by All-American nose tackle Tony Casillas, whose injury against Texas forced him to miss the game. The line featured sophomore tackle Troy Johnson, sophomore end Darrell Reed, and senior end Kevin Murphy, himself an All-American candidate. Lining up behind the group was the menacing Brian Bosworth, with fellow linebackers Paul Migliazzo and Dante Jones (another talented sophomore). This group had permitted an average of only 32 yards rushing per game. Juniors Tony Rayburn and Sonny Brown, and sophomores Rickey Dixon and Derrick White, patrolled the secondary, allowing only 91 yards passing per game. In three games, the defense had allowed only 16 first downs and had permitted an average of 6.6 points per game.

Miami had lost their '85 opener to Florida, 35-23, before reeling off four straight wins against unranked opponents. The Hurricanes were the nation's top offensive team, and they were sporting a pro-style passing attack, orchestrated by junior quarterback Vinny Testaverde, who had backed up Bernie Kosar the last time the Hurricanes had won the National Championship. Alonzo Highsmith and Melvin Bratton lined up in the backfield, and the acrobatics of top-flight wide receivers Michael Irvin and Brian Blades helped the team average 36.2 points per game. The Hurricane defense came in after a shutout of Cincinnati, permitting an average of only 16 points per game, featuring junior tackle Jerome Brown and cornerback Bennie Blades.

In front of a sellout crowd of 75,008 at Memorial Stadium, Miami's Jerome Brown broke through and sacked Aikman on the 29-yard line with 9:18 left in the first half and broke his ankle. Aikman, who had been six of eight passing for 131 yards, would be lost for the season.

Testaverde and company took over, scorching the Oklahoma secondary with 270 yards passing and the 'Canes rambled for 105 on the ground. They played mistake-free football and didn't give up any turnovers. Brown led the Miami defensive effort with 16 tackles, a blocked field goal, and the sack on Aikman. And on the other side, pressed into duty as a true freshman, Holieway had rushed for only 57 yards on 17 carries and attempted just six passes.

Furious about the loss, both of the game and their starting quarterback, Oklahoma proceeded to go on a rampage, pasting Iowa State, Kansas, Missouri and Colorado by a combined score of 189-26, before playing host to Nebraska in a game that would ultimately decide the Big 8 Championship.

	Miami	OU
First downs	17	20
Rushing yards	39–105	63–211
Passing	17–28–0	7–14–1
Passing yards	270	151
Total Offense	375	362
Fumbles Lost	0	1
Penalties	4–30	5–48
Time of Possession	26:57	33:03

=== Iowa State ===
Iowa State Cyclones at #10 Oklahoma Sooners

Team	1	2	3	4	Total
Cyclones	7	0	0	7	14
• No. 10 Sooners	10	21	21	7	59

- Date: October 26
- Location: Oklahoma Memorial Stadium
- Game attendance: 70,124

In freshman Jamelle Holieway's first start at quarterback, the Sooners rolled up 542 yards rushing and 643 yards of total offense in a dominant win over Iowa State.

	ISU	OU
First downs	15	25
Rushing yards	41–122	64–542
Passing	15–27–0	2–5–0
Passing yards	128	101
Total Offense	250	643
Fumbles Lost	1	1
Penalties	8–65	7–81
Time of Possession	31:21	28:39

=== Kansas ===
Kansas Jayhawks at #9 Oklahoma Sooners

Team	1	2	3	4	Total
Jayhawks	3	0	3	0	6
• No. 9 Sooners	0	20	14	14	48

- Date: November 2
- Location: Oklahoma Memorial Stadium
- Game attendance: 74,726

	KU	OU
First downs	14	22
Rushing yards	40–63	58–424
Passing	14–33–3	5–8–0
Passing yards	112	101
Total Offense	175	525
Fumbles Lost	1	3
Penalties	9–69	3–30
Time of Possession	33:30	26:30

=== at Missouri ===
#7 Oklahoma Sooners at Missouri Tigers

Team	1	2	3	4	Total
• No. 7 Sooners	3	20	7	21	51
Tigers	0	3	3	0	6

- Date: November 9
- Location: Memorial Stadium
- Game attendance: 50,321

	OU	MU
First downs	24	12
Rushing yards	66–341	37–62
Passing	8–17–1	15–25–2
Passing yards	168	157
Total Offense	509	219
Fumbles Lost	2	4
Penalties	6–38	4–35
Time of Possession	32:49	27:11

=== Colorado ===
Colorado Buffaloes at #7 Oklahoma Sooners

Team	1	2	3	4	Total
Buffaloes	0	0	0	0	0
• No. 7 Sooners	7	7	10	7	31

- Date: November 16
- Location: Oklahoma Memorial Stadium, Norman, Oklahoma
- Game attendance: 74,145

Scoring summary
1	OU	Collins 1-yard run (Lashar kick)	OU 7–0
2	OU	Holieway 2-yard run (Lashar kick)	OU 14–0
3	OU	Holieway 20-yard run (Lashar kick)	OU 21–0
3	OU	Lashar 30-yard field goal	OU 24–0
4	OU	Tillman 5-yard run (Lashar kick)	OU 31–0

	CU	OU
First downs	6	24
Rushing yards	39–75	81–360
Passing	4–12–1	3–10–0
Passing yards	34	39
Total Offense	109	399
Fumbles Lost	0	3
Penalties	5–45	3–20
Time of Possession	25:34	34:26

=== No. 2 Nebraska ===
#2 Nebraska Cornhuskers at #5 Oklahoma Sooners

Team	1	2	3	4	Total
No. 2 Cornhuskers	0	0	0	7	7
• No. 5 Sooners	14	3	10	0	27

- Date: November 23
- Location: Oklahoma Memorial Stadium, Norman, Oklahoma
- Game attendance: 75,554
- Game weather: Overcast
- TV announcers (ABC): Keith Jackson, Frank Broyles, and Tim Brant

Scoring summary
1	11:21	OU	Keith Jackson 88-yard run (Tim Lashar kick)	OU 7–0
1	5:52	OU	Jamelle Holieway 43-yard run (Lashar kick)	OU 14–0
2	1:18	OU	Lashar 37-yard field goal	OU 17–0
3	9:19	OU	Lashar 33-yard field goal	OU 20–0
3	2:26	OU	Holieway 17-yard run (Lashar kick)	OU 27–0
4	0:26	Neb	Chris Spachman 76-yard fumble return (Klein kick)	OU 27–7

Nebraska came into Norman ranked second in the nation, with the nation's highest scoring offense with 39.1 points per game and the best rushing attack in the country with 395 yards per game. This high-powered offense was led by fullback Tom Rathman, one of the best in Nebraska history who had rushed for over 800 yards that season. Together with quarterback McCathorn Clayton and junior I-back Doug DuBose, whose 1,115 rushing yards made 1985 his second straight season over 1,000, the Cornhuskers were poised for a national title run. Junior linebacker Marc Munford was the leading tackler for the Huskers for the second straight year and led the defense, together with tackle Jim Skow and defensive back Brian Washington.

The home team struck quickly. On their second possession of the game, Oklahoma was faced with a second down-and-six at its 12, and they ran a tight end reverse. Freshman quarterback Jamelle Holieway, starting just his fifth game and in charge of a wishbone that was the third best rushing offense in the land, optioned to the left and gave a reverse handoff to big sophomore tight end Keith Jackson, who raced untouched down the right sideline 88 yards for a touchdown, the sixth longest run in school history.

Tom Osborne was forced to reach into his bag of tricks in the second quarter, as Nebraska executed a perfect double reverse. Clayton flipped the ball to DuBose who headed right, and DuBose handed the ball to wingback Van Sheppard who carried it 52 yards before being brought down inside the Sooner ten. The Oklahoma defense, led by senior nose tackle Tony Casillas and sophomore linebacker Brian Bosworth, did not budge. The Cornhuskers, stifled at the point of attack, were forced to kick a field goal. Sophomore kicker Dale Klein missed a 23-yard field goal attempt and the Huskers were kept off the board after their best offensive series of the game.

In fact, the only time the Huskers would score that day was on defense, and then only as a side note. Freshman backup quarterback Eric Mitchel bobbled a handoff, and Nebraska defensive tackle Chris Spachman caught the Sooner fumble in midair and rambled 76 yards down the left sideline for a touchdown with only 26 seconds left. The Sooners had won 27-7.

The Oklahoma defense was devastating, holding the nation's highest scoring offense without a point. Bosworth had nine tackles, Murphy sacked the quarterback twice, including the stopper on one of the goal line stands, and Casillas was all over the Nebraska backfield. They held the Huskers to just 161 yards on 42 carries, led by Sheppard's 65 yards and with DuBose gaining only 46 on 16 carries. It was the second straight year that the Sooners had held the Huskers to just a touchdown and the first time they had accomplished that feat in back-to-back games in 27 years.

Holieway was spectacular, directing the wishbone as if he were far more experienced than his true freshman status. He was virtually flawless as he rushed for 110 yards on 25 carries and scored a pair of touchdowns. Keith Jackson ran for 136 yards on just three carries and scored once. Together they accounted for 246 yards on the ground, representing more than half the team's 461 total yards. This marked the first time in 11 years that two Sooners had crossed the century mark rushing against the Huskers.

	NU	OU
First downs	10	19
Rushing yards	42–161	70–423
Passing	4–15–3	1–4–0
Passing yards	63	38
Total Offense	224	461
Fumbles Lost	1	2
Penalties	2–20	3–13
Time of Possession	25:34	34:26

=== At Oklahoma St ===
#3 Oklahoma Sooners (8–1) at #17 Oklahoma State Cowboys (8–2)

Quarter	1	2	3	4	Total
Oklahoma	0	10	0	3	13
Oklahoma St	0	0	0	0	0

at Lewis Field, Stillwater, Oklahoma

- Date: November 30
- Game time: 7:30 p.m. EST
- Game weather: low 20s
- Game attendance: 44,000
- TV: ESPN

Game information

First quarter

- No scoring

Second quarter

- OU – Tim Lashar 27-yard field goal. Oklahoma 3–0. Drive:
- OU – Spencer Tillman 3-yard run (Tim Lashar kick). Oklahoma 10–0. Drive:

Third quarter

- No scoring

Fourth quarter

- OU – Tim Lashar 30-yard field goal, 5:44. Oklahoma 13–0. Drive:

Top passers

- OU – Jamelle Holieway – 4/5, 54 yards, INT
- OSU – Ronnie Williams – 5/25, 32 yards, INT

Top rushers

- OU – Lydell Carr – 24 rushes, 78 yards
- OSU – Thurman Thomas – 23 rushes, 100 yards

Top receivers

- OU – Damon Stell – 1 reception, 31 yards
- OSU – Kenneth Brown – 1 reception, 15 yards

"The Ice Bowl"

Tim Lashar sets Oklahoma single season school field goal record.

=== SMU ===
SMU Mustangs at #4 Oklahoma Sooners

Team	1	2	3	4	Total
Mustangs	7	0	0	6	13
• No. 4 Sooners	0	21	7	7	35

- Date: December 7
- Location: Oklahoma Memorial Stadium
- Game attendance: 72,046
- TV announcers (ABC): Keith Jackson (1st half only), Frank Broyles, and Tim Brant (1st half sideline reporter/2nd half play-by-play)

	SMU	OU
First downs	14	27
Rushing yards	51–206	75–377
Passing	8–15–2	3–8–0
Passing yards	76	40
Total Offense	282	417
Fumbles Lost	2	2
Penalties	5–31	3–30
Time of Possession	25:59	34:01

=== vs. No. 1 Penn State (Orange Bowl) ===
#1 Penn State Nittany Lions vs. #3 Oklahoma Sooners

Team	1	2	3	4	Total
No. 1 Nittany Lions	7	3	0	0	10
• No. 3 Sooners	0	16	3	6	25

- Date: January 1, 1986
- Location: Orange Bowl
- Game attendance: 74,178
- Referee: Robert Aillet (SEC)
- TV announcers (NBC): Don Criqui (play-by-play), Bob Trumpy (analyst), Bob Griese (sideline), and Jimmy Cefalo (sideline)

Scoring summary
1	8:17	PSU	Tim Manoa 1-yard run (Massimo Manca kick)	PSU 7–0
2	14:35	OU	Tim Lashar 26-yard field goal	PSU 7–3
2	12:26	OU	Keith Jackson 71-yard pass from Jamelle Holieway (Tim Lashar kick)	OU 10–7
2	5:20	OU	Tim Lashar 31-yard field goal	OU 13–7
2	1:49	OU	Tim Lashar 21-yard field goal	OU 16–7
2	0:01	PSU	Massimo Manca 27-yard field goal	OU 16–10
3	3:09	OU	Tim Lashar 22-yard field goal	OU 19–10
4	1:42	OU	Lydell Carr 61-yard run (Lashar kick failed)	OU 25–10

Earlier in the day, UCLA had crushed #4 Iowa 45-28 in the Rose Bowl. SEC champion Tennessee and Miami were playing in the Sugar Bowl, with the Hurricanes allowed an outside shot at the title with a Penn State loss. The Sooners needed either a win combined with a Miami loss or a blowout victory to claim the title during the 1986 Orange Bowl.

On their opening possession, Oklahoma reached into their bag of tricks and a handoff to Keith Jackson was flipped to Anthony Stafford, but linebacker Shane Conlan was ready for it, stuffing the play for a two-yard loss. This set the initial tempo of the game, as the Penn State defense showed itself to be ready for the speedy Sooner wishbone option.

The game was very close, and remained a defensive struggle into the 4th quarter, but Oklahoma proved to be too much for the Lions, particularly after it was announced at the half that Tennessee was pounding Miami to the tune of 28-7 in the Sugar Bowl. The Sooner defense played inspired football, Tim Lashar nailed four critical field goals, Keith Jackson caught a 71-yard bomb from Jamelle Holieway in stride, and Lydell Carr put the nail in the coffin with a brilliant 61-yard touchdown scamper with 1:42 remaining on the clock.

The Sooners scored a 25-10 victory over the top team in the land in the 1986 Orange Bowl and the team's sixth National Championship.

	PSU	OU
First downs	14	12
Rushing yards	36–103	52–228
Passing	18–34–4	3–6–0
Passing yards	164	91
Total Offense	267	319
Fumbles Lost	1	1
Penalties	6–49	7–45
Time of Possession	31:23	28:37

== Awards and honors ==
=== All-Americans ===
- Brian Bosworth, Linebacker – Irving, Texas
- Tony Casillas, Noseguard – Tulsa, Okla.
- Kevin Murphy, Defensive end – Richardson, Texas

=== Individual award winners ===
- Brian Bosworth – Dick Butkus Award
- Tony Casillas – Lombardi Award

== Postseason ==
=== NFL draft ===
The following players were drafted into the National Football League following the season.

Round	Pick	Player	Position	NFL team
1	2	Tony Casillas	Defensive tackle	Atlanta Falcons
2	40	Kevin Murphy	Linebacker	Tampa Bay Buccaneers
5	116	Jeff Tupper	Defensive end	St. Louis Cardinals
