= Sonny Brown =

Sonny Brown may refer to:

- Sonny Brown (American football)
- Sonny Brown (musician)
