= Danny Noonan (American football) =

American football player (born 1965)

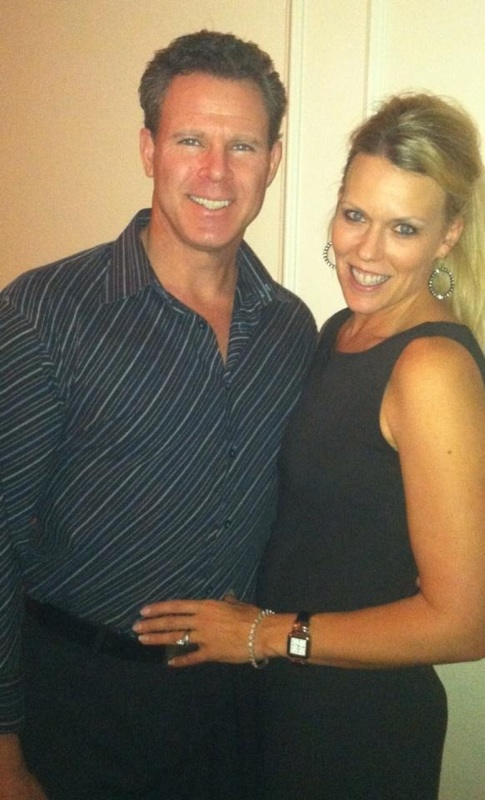

No. 73, 95, 97
- Positions: Defensive end, defensive tackle

Personal information
- Born: July 14, 1965 (age 61); Lincoln, Nebraska, U.S.
- Listed height: 6 ft 4 in (1.93 m)
- Listed weight: 288 lb (131 kg)

Career information
- High school: Lincoln Northeast (lincoln)
- College: Nebraska
- NFL draft: 1987: 1st round, 12th overall pick

Career history
- Dallas Cowboys (1987–1992); Green Bay Packers (1992); Denver Broncos (1993)*
- * Offseason or practice squad member only

Awards and highlights
- Unanimous All-American (1986); Big Eight Athlete-of-the-Year (1986); First-team All-Big Eight (1986); Second-team All-Big Eight (1985)

Career NFL statistics
- Sacks: 15
- Interceptions: 1
- Touchdowns: 1
- Stats at Pro Football Reference

Daniel Nicholas Noonan (born July 14, 1965) is an American former professional football player who was a defensive end in the National Football League (NFL) for the Dallas Cowboys and Green Bay Packers. He played college football for the Nebraska Cornhuskers.

== Early life ==
Noonan was born six miles from the University of Nebraska–Lincoln campus. He attended Lincoln Northeast High School, where he played both defensive and offensive tackle. As a senior in 1982, he helped the team win a state title, while receiving All-American and All-state honors. He was selected to play in the state’s 1983 All-Star Shrine Bowl football game played at Memorial Stadium.

== College career ==
He accepted a football scholarship from the University of Nebraska–Lincoln, to play under head coach Tom Osborne. He was a defensive tackle during his first two seasons.

As a junior, defensive coordinator Charlie McBride moved him to middle guard and he became a starter. He tallied 3 sacks against the University of Illinois. He made 9 tackles both against the University of Oklahoma and the University of Michigan.

Noonan had a dominant season as a senior, registering 53 tackles and 12 sacks (led the team), on a team that ranked second in the nation in total defense, allowing 235.5 yards per game and only 2.4 yards per run. He received numerous awards and honors, including the Big 8 Athlete-of-the-Year, First-team All-American (AP, UPI, FWAA, Kodak, Walter Camp, Football News), All Star Japan Bowl and Big 8 Player-of-the-Week (Florida State).

In 1991, he was inducted into the Nebraska Football Hall of Fame. In 2005, he was selected by the Omaha World-Herald as one of Nebraska's Top 100 greatest athletes.

== Professional career ==
=== Dallas Cowboys ===
Noonan was selected by the Dallas Cowboys in the first round (12th overall) of the 1987 NFL draft, with the intention of being the eventual successor to All-Pro Randy White and to help revitalize an aging defensive line. After having the longest holdout by a rookie in franchise history at the time, he fell behind in learning the nuances of head coach Tom Landry's flex defense and was only a situational player. He began at defensive end, before being moved to defensive tackle in the second half of the season. White was limited with injuries, so Noonan helped in run situations, finishing with 27 tackles and one sack.

By his second season he was considered the Cowboys' strongest player, being able to bench press 505 pounds. Despite suffering hip, knee and heel injuries, his best year statistically was in 1988, when he replaced White as the starter at right defensive end, recording 16 starts, 84 tackles, 7.5 sacks (tied for the team lead with Garry Cobb) and returned one interception for a touchdown. Against the Atlanta Falcons, he intercepted a pass tipped at the line of scrimmage and returned it 17 yards for a touchdown and sacked quarterback Chris Miller for a safety. In the eighth game against the Philadelphia Eagles, he had 9 tackles and 3 sacks.

In 1989, he missed 9 games with a groin injury he suffered in training camp, posting only 5 starts in 7 games, 23 tackles, 9 quarterback pressures, one sack and one pass defensed.

In 1990, he regained his starting role (15 starts), finishing fourth (first among defensive lineman) on the team in tackles (85), while also making 4.5 sacks, 16 quarterback pressures and 4 passes defensed.

After starting the first 3 games at right defensive end in 1991, with the addition of Tony Casillas, plus the emergence of Russell Maryland and Jimmie Jones, he was moved to a backup role and played sparingly the rest of the season, making 20 tackles (2 for loss), one quarterback pressure, one pass defensed and one sack.

He was released after starting the first 2 games of the 1992 season on September 14, to make room for Russell Maryland upon his return from a toe injury. He started 41 out of 67 possible games and recorded 15 sacks in his Cowboys career.

=== Green Bay Packers ===
On September 16, 1992, he was claimed off waivers by the Green Bay Packers, played 6 games as a backup in the team's 3-4 defense and recorded 4 tackles, before being waived on November 10.

=== Denver Broncos ===
On April 6, 1993, he signed as a free agent with the Denver Broncos. He retired on August 17, after missing almost half of the team's training camp with a knee injury.

== Personal life ==
Noonan married his wife Julie in 2002 and they have six children (Sydney, Sam, Maverick, Alec, Branson and Marisa) and 3 grandchildren Levi, Charles and Myles.
