= 1985 All-Big Eight Conference football team =

The 1985 All-Big Eight Conference football team consists of American football players chosen by various organizations for All-Big Eight Conference teams for the 1985 NCAA Division I-A football season. The selectors for the 1985 season included the Associated Press (AP) and United Press International (UPI).

== Offensive selections ==
=== Quarterbacks ===
- Jamelle Holieway, Oklahoma (AP-1; UPI-1)
- Mike Norseth, Kansas (AP-2; UPI-2)

=== Running backs ===
- Thurman Thomas, Oklahoma State (AP-1; UPI-1)
- Doug DuBose, Nebraska (AP-1; UPI-1)
- Tom Rathman, Nebraska (AP-1; UPI-2)
- Darrell Wallace, Missouri (AP-2; UPI-2)
- Lydell Carr, Oklahoma (AP-2)

=== Tight ends ===
- Keith Jackson, Oklahoma (AP-1; UPI-1)
- Jeff Wodka, Iowa State (AP-2; UPI-2)

=== Wide receivers ===
- Richard Estell, Kansas (AP-1; UPI-1)
- Herbert Johnson, Missouri (AP-2; UPI-1)
- Gerald Alphin, Kansas State (AP-2; UPI-2)
- Bobby Riley, Oklahoma State (UPI-2)

=== Centers ===
- Bill Lewis, Nebraska (AP-1; UPI-1)
- Eric Coyle, Colorado (AP-2; UPI-2)

=== Guards ===
- Brian Blankenship, Nebraska (AP-1; UPI-1)
- Mark Hutson, Oklahoma (AP-1; UPI-2)
- Junior Ili, Colorado (AP-2; UPI-2)
- Anthony Phillips, Oklahoma (AP-2; UPI-1)

=== Tackles ===
- Paul Blair, Oklahoma State (AP-1; UPI-1)
- John Clay, Missouri (AP-1; UPI-1)
- Jim Davis, Kansas (UPI-2)
- Jim Webb, Colorado (UPI-2)
- Eric Pope, Oklahoma (AP-2)
- Tim Roth, Nebraska (AP-2)

== Defensive selections ==
=== Defensive ends ===
- Kevin Murphy, Oklahoma (AP-1; UPI-1)
- Darrell Reed, Oklahoma (AP-1; UPI-1)
- Jim Luebbers, Iowa State (AP-2; UPI-2)
- Kevin Humphrey, Kansas State (AP-2)
- Dan McMillen, Colorado (UPI-2)

=== Defensive Tackles ===
- Leslie O'Neal, Oklahoma State (AP-1; UPI-1)
- Tony Casillas, Oklahoma (AP-1; UPI-1)
- Jim Skow, Nebraska (AP-1; UPI-1)
- Danny Noonan, Nebraska (AP-2; UPI-2)
- John Washington, Oklahoma State (AP-2; UPI-2)
- Dick Chapura, Missouri (AP-2)
- Chris Spachman, Nebraska (UPI-2)

=== Linebackers ===
- Brian Bosworth, Oklahoma (AP-1; UPI-1)
- Willie Pless, Kansas (AP-1; UPI-1)
- Marc Munford, Nebraska (AP-1; UPI-2)
- Barry Remington, Colorado (AP-2; UPI-2)
- Jeff Brasswell, Iowa State (AP-2)

=== Defensive backs ===
- Barton Hundley, Kansas State (AP-1; UPI-1)
- Mark Moore, Oklahoma State (AP-1; UPI-1)
- Mike Hudson, Oklahoma State (AP-1; UPI-1)
- Mickey Pruitt, Colorado (AP-2; UPI-1)
- Erik McMillan, Missouri (AP-2; UPI-2)
- Brian Washington, Nebraska (AP-2; UPI-2)
- Sonny Brown, Oklahoma (UPI-2)
- Rickey Dixon, Oklahoma (AP-2)
- Anthony Mayze, Iowa State (UPI-2)

== Special teams ==
=== Place-kicker ===
- Dale Klein, Nebraska (AP-1; UPI-1)
- Jeff Johnson, Kansas (AP-2)
- Tom Whelihan, Missouri (UPI-2)

=== Punter ===
- Barry Helton, Colorado (AP-1; UPI-1)
- Mike Winchester, Oklahoma (UPI-2)

== Key ==
AP = Associated Press UPI = United Press International

== See also ==
- 1985 College Football All-America Team
