= Jim Dickey =

American football player and coach (1934–2018)

Biographical details
- Born: March 22, 1933
- Died: February 18, 2018 (aged 84); Houston, Texas, U.S.

Playing career
- 1954–1955: Houston
- Position: Quarterback

Coaching career (HC unless noted)
- 1963–1965: Houston (assistant)
- 1966–1969: Oklahoma State (assistant)
- 1970–1972: Oklahoma (DB)
- 1973–1974: Kansas (DC)
- 1975–1977: North Carolina (DC)
- 1978–1985: Kansas State
- 1986–1987: Florida (ILB)
- 1988–1989: Florida (DB)
- 1991: Southern Miss (DC/DB)

Head coaching record
- Overall: 24–54–2
- Bowls: 0–1

Accomplishments and honors

Awards
- Big Eight Coach of the Year (1982)

James Howard Dickey (March 22, 1933 – February 18, 2018) was an American college football player and coach. He served as the head football coach at Kansas State University from 1978 to 1985, compiling record of 24–54–2. In 1981, he redshirted 18 players, including eight seniors and almost all of his best players. With all of those players returning the following season in 1982, Dickey led Kansas State to their first bowl game appearance in school history, the Independence Bowl, where they lost to the Wisconsin Badgers. 1982 was also the first winning season for the program since 1970 under head coach Vince Gibson.

After opening the 1985 season with two consecutive losses to I-AA teams, Dickey was forced to resign on September 15. Assistant athletic director Lee Moon coached the team for the remainder of the season posting a 1–8 record.

Dickey was the father of the former Kansas State quarterback and former head football coach at the University of North Texas, Darrell Dickey. He died on February 18, 2018, at the age of 84.

== Head coaching record ==
Year	Team	Overall	Conference	Standing	Bowl/playoffs
Kansas State Wildcats (Big Eight Conference) (1978–1985)
1978	Kansas State	4–7	3–4	T–5th	
1979	Kansas State	3–8	1–6	8th	
1980	Kansas State	3–8	2–5	6th	
1981	Kansas State	2–9	1–6	8th	
1982	Kansas State	6–5–1	3–3–1	4th	L Independence
1983	Kansas State	3–8	1–6	8th	
1984	Kansas State	3–7–1	2–4–1	T–5th	
1985	Kansas State	0–2*			
Kansas State:		24–54–2	13–34–2		
Total:		24–54–2			

* Dickey resigned as head coach after the second game of the 1985 season.
