= Rickey Dixon =

American football player (1966–2020)

No. 29, 31
- Position: Safety

Personal information
- Born: December 26, 1966; Dallas, Texas, U.S.
- Died: August 1, 2020 (aged 53); DeSoto, Texas, U.S.
- Listed height: 5 ft 11 in (1.80 m)
- Listed weight: 177 lb (80 kg)

Career information
- High school: Wilmer-Hutchins (Dallas, Texas)
- College: Oklahoma (1984–1987)
- NFL draft: 1988: 1st round, 5th overall pick

Career history
- Cincinnati Bengals (1988–1992); Los Angeles Raiders (1993); Green Bay Packers (1995)*
- * Offseason or practice squad member only

Awards and highlights
- National champion (1985); Jim Thorpe Award (1987) (Note: Co-winner with Bennie Blades); Consensus All-American (1987); 2× First-team All-Big Eight (1986, 1987); Second-team All-Big Eight (1985); Big Eight Conference All-Time Team

Career NFL statistics
- Interceptions: 6
- Interception yards: 122
- Fumble recoveries: 1
- Stats at Pro Football Reference
- College Football Hall of Fame

Rickey Dixon (December 26, 1966 – August 1, 2020) was an American professional football safety who played in the National Football League (NFL). He played college football for the Oklahoma Sooners, where he won the Jim Thorpe Award in 1987. Dixon was selected by the Cincinnati Bengals in the first round of the 1988 NFL draft with the fifth overall pick. He played five seasons with the Bengals and one for the Los Angeles Raiders.

== College career ==
A standout defensive back at Wilmer-Hutchins High School in Dallas, Dixon came to Norman to play for the Sooners in 1984. He played in the 1985, 1986, 1987, and 1988 Orange Bowls, in two National Championship games, and was a key figure in Oklahoma's 1985 National Championship win over Penn State in the 1986 Orange Bowl.

A consensus All-American in 1987, Dixon was the first Sooner to win the Jim Thorpe Award, given to the top defensive back in the country. He shared the Award with Miami's Bennie Blades. He won all-conference honors in 1986 and 1987.

The defining game of Dixon's collegiate career was the 1987 contest against the Nebraska Cornhuskers. Hyped as the "Game of the Century II", playing on the moniker given to the 1971 contest between Oklahoma and Nebraska, Nebraska was favored at home in Lincoln, boasting the #1 offense in the country.

The Sooners came in ranked #2 in the nation, and sporting the #1 defense in the country. Nebraska quarterback Steve Taylor came into the game boasting that the Sooners could not compete against the Cornhuskers. It was Dixon's two interceptions of Taylor in the game (one to set up a short touchdown drive, and one late in the fourth quarter to seal the win) that put the Cornhuskers away and guaranteed Oklahoma a shot at the Miami Hurricanes in the 1988 Orange Bowl. In the Orange Bowl, Dixon had another key interception to set up a Sooner touchdown drive in a game that Miami eventually won, 20-14.

Dixon finished his career with 170 total tackles and 17 interceptions (second only to Darrell Royal for the school record). During his senior year, he had nine interceptions for 232 yards which remain school records for the Sooners.

=== College statistics ===
Season	UT	AT	TT	INT	PBU
1984	17	11	29	2-41	4
1985	20	4	29	3-28	1
1986	33	16	52	3-2	6
1987	42	13	60	9-232	12
Totals	112	44	170	17-303	23

== Professional career ==
The Cincinnati Bengals selected Dixon in the first round with the fifth overall pick of the 1988 NFL draft.

He had one interception during his first season with the Bengals. Although relegated to special teams, Dixon played in Super Bowl XXIII against the San Francisco 49ers. Dixon was traded to the Los Angeles Raiders prior to the 1993 season.

=== NFL statistics ===
			Interception Stats			Defense Stats					
Year	Team	Games	INTs	Yards	TD	FF	FR	Yards	TD	Sacks	Tackles
1988	Cincinnati Bengals	15	1	13	0	0	1	-3	0	*	*
1989	Cincinnati Bengals	16	3	47	0	0	0	0	0	*	*
1990	Cincinnati Bengals	13	0	0	0	0	0	0	0	*	*
1991	Cincinnati Bengals	15	2	62	0	0	0	0	0	*	*
1992	Cincinnati Bengals	14	0	0	0	0	0	0	0	*	*
1993	Los Angeles Raiders	9	0	0	0	0	0	0	0	*	*
Totals		82	6	122	0	0	1	-3	0	*	*

* Tackle data unavailable before 2001

- Career statistics from Pro Football Reference

== Personal life ==
After retiring from the NFL, Dixon coached for W.T White High School and Paul Quinn College, and retired from being a physical education teacher at Red Oak High School in Red Oak, Texas, in May 2007. Dixon was diagnosed with amyotrophic lateral sclerosis in 2013. In 2014, Dixon was awarded a settlement of $4.5 million from a case brought against the NFL regarding concussion related health issues.

Dixon was elected to the College Football Hall of Fame in 2019.

Dixon died on August 1, 2020, at the age of 53 in DeSoto, Texas, due to complications from Amyotrophic lateral sclerosis.
