= Jeff Tupper (American football) =

American football player (born 1962)

No. 69, 91
- Position: Defensive end

Personal information
- Born: December 26, 1962 (age 63); Joplin, Missouri, U.S.
- Listed height: 6 ft 5 in (1.96 m)
- Listed weight: 269 lb (122 kg)

Career information
- High school: Parkwood (Joplin)
- College: Oklahoma (1981–1985)
- NFL draft: 1986: 5th round, 116th overall pick

Career history
- St. Louis Cardinals (1986)*; Philadelphia Eagles (1986–1987); Denver Broncos (1987); Kansas City Chiefs (1987–1988)
- * Offseason or practice squad member only

Awards and highlights
- National champion (1985)

Career NFL statistics
- Games played: 7
- Games started: 3
- Sacks: 1.5
- Stats at Pro Football Reference

Jeffrey Culver Tupper (born December 26, 1962) is an American former professional football defensive end and who played for the Philadelphia Eagles and Denver Broncos of the National Football League (NFL). He played college football for the Oklahoma Sooners. Tupper also had stints with the St. Louis Cardinals and Kansas City Chiefs.

== Early life ==
Tupper was born on December 26, 1962, in Joplin, Missouri. He attended Parkwood High School in Joplin. On February 11, 1981, Tupper committed to play college football at the University of Oklahoma.

== College career ==
Tupper played college football for the Oklahoma Sooners from 1981 to 1985 and was a four-year letterman from 1982 to 1985. In October 1981, he underwent season-ending shoulder surgery to remove a calcium deposit and redshirted. In 1985, Tupper was selected to the All-Big Eight team as an honorable mention.

== Professional career ==
=== St. Louis Cardinals ===
Tupper was selected in the fifth round, with the 116th overall selection, by the St. Louis Cardinals in the 1986 NFL draft. On July 14, he signed his rookie contract with the team. On September 1, Tupper was released.

=== Philadelphia Eagles ===
On November 12, 1986, Tupper was signed by the Philadelphia Eagles. He played in the final three games of the season, recording no statistics. On September 11, 1987, Tupper was waived by the team.

=== Denver Broncos ===
On September 29, 1987, Tupper was signed by the Denver Broncos as a replacement player. He started in all three strike games, logging 1.5 sacks. After the strike ended, the Broncos retained Tupper and he played in one further game. On November 3, he was released by the team.

=== Kansas City Chiefs ===
On November 18, 1987, the Kansas City Chiefs signed Tupper. On November 25, he was released. On December 23, Tupper was re-signed by the Chiefs. On August 29, 1988, he was placed on the injured reserve. On February 1, 1989, he became a free agent.
