= 1986 Orange Bowl =

- 52nd Orange Bowl; National Championship Game (Note: Through luck and fortuitous scheduling, a "national championship game" was occasionally able to settle the matter on the field, as described in some contemporaneous reports. Despite the promotional billing, in several instances there were plausible scenarios for a third team to be selected as national champion by the major selectors, depending on outcomes of other games.) (Note: Oklahoma entered the game No. 2 in the Coaches Poll and No. 3 in the AP Poll. AP No. 2 Miami lost in the Sugar Bowl played at the same time.)
- The Miami Orange Bowl in Miami, Florida, hosted the Orange Bowl.
Penn State Nittany Lions	Oklahoma Sooners
(11–0)	(10–1)
Independent	Big Eight
10	25
Head coach: Joe Paterno	Head coach: Barry Switzer
AP / Coaches; 1 / 1	AP / Coaches; 3 / 2
	1	2	3	4	Total
Penn State	7	3	0	0	10
Oklahoma	0	16	3	6	25
- Date: January 1, 1986
- Season: 1985
- Stadium: Orange Bowl
- Location: Miami, Florida
- MVP: Sonny Brown (Oklahoma DB); Tim Lashar (Oklahoma K)
- Favorite: Oklahoma by 7 points
- Referee: Robert Aillet (SEC)
- Attendance: 74,178

United States TV coverage
- Network: NBC
- Announcers: Don Criqui (play-by-play); Bob Trumpy (color analyst); Bob Griese and Jimmy Cefalo (sideline)
- Nielsen ratings: 21.3

The 1986 Orange Bowl was the 52nd edition of the college football bowl game, played at the Orange Bowl in Miami, Florida, on Wednesday, January 1. Part of the 1985–86 bowl game season, it matched the independent and top-ranked Penn State Nittany Lions and the #3 Oklahoma Sooners of the Big Eight Conference. Favored Oklahoma trailed early but won 25–10.

== Teams ==
=== Penn State ===
The Nittany Lions won all eleven games, were the only undefeated team coming into this matchup and were ranked first in both polls, but were an underdog in this game. This was Penn State's first Orange Bowl appearance in twelve years.

=== Oklahoma ===
The #3 Sooners' sole loss was at home to Miami in mid-October. This was Oklahoma's second straight Orange Bowl appearance and their second straight Big Eight Conference title.

== Game summary ==
The final game of a tripleheader on NBC, the game followed the Rose Bowl and kicked off shortly after 8 p.m. EST, at the same time as the Sugar Bowl on ABC, which matched second-ranked Miami and #8 Tennessee.

Tim Manoa gave Penn State an early lead on a short touchdown run and they led 7–0 after the first quarter. But Tim Lashar kicked three field goals and Keith Jackson caught a 71-yard touchdown pass from Jamelle Holieway as Oklahoma scored sixteen points in the second quarter while Massimo Manca gave the Nittany Lions their only points of the quarter with a late field goal to make it 16–10 at halftime.

Penn State was shut out from there, as Oklahoma's defense took over. Brian Bosworth had twelve tackles and the defense had a total of four interceptions. In the second half, Lashar kicked his third field goal, and Lydell Carr broke for a 61-yard touchdown run to seal the championship for the Sooners.

Kicker Lashar and defensive back Sonny Brown were named the game's most valuable players.

1986 Orange Bowl

Quarter	1	2	3	4	Total
No.1 Penn State	7	3	0	0	10
No. 3 Oklahoma	0	16	3	6	25

at Orange Bowl • Miami, Florida

- Date: Wednesday, January 1, 1986
- Game time: 8:00 p.m. EST
- Game attendance: 74,178
- TV announcers (NBC): Don Criqui (play-by-play), Bob Trumpy (color analyst), Bob Griese and Jimmy Cefalo (sideline)

Game information

First quarter

- PSU – Tim Manoa 1-yard run (Massimo Manca kick)

Second quarter

- OKLA – Tim Lashar 26-yard field goal
- OKLA – Keith Jackson 71-yard pass from Jamelle Holieway (Lashar kick)
- OKLA – Lashar 31-yard field goal
- OKLA – Lashar 21-yard field goal
- PSU – Manca 27-yard field goal

Third quarter

- OKLA – Lashar 22-yard field goal

Fourth quarter

- OKLA – Lydell Carr 61-yard run (kick failed)

=== Statistics ===
Statistics	PSU	OKLA
First downs	14	12
Plays–yards		
Rushes–yards	36–103	52–228
Passing yards	164	91
Passing: comp–att–int	18–34–4	3–6–0
Time of possession	31:23	28:37

Team	Category	Player	Statistics
PSU	Passing		
PSU	Rushing		
PSU	Receiving		
Oklahoma	Passing		
Oklahoma	Rushing		
Oklahoma	Receiving		

== Aftermath ==
The Sooners' championship became unanimous following #2 Miami's 35–7 loss to Tennessee in the Sugar Bowl, which was played at the same time. If the Hurricanes had won, the split national championship was probable as Miami was outranked by Oklahoma in the coaches poll and had soundly defeated the Sooners in Norman. The Sooners would not win the national championship again until 2000.

Penn State was in title contention again the following season, as they finished second in the polls. This time, a matchup between the #1 and #2 teams was able to be made and the Nittany Lions were scheduled to play #1 Miami for the national championship in the Fiesta Bowl, which they won.
