= Lee Moon =

American football coach

Playing career
- 1966–1969: VMI

Coaching career (HC unless noted)
- 1972–1973: Virginia (GA)
- 1973–1976: Duke (assistant)
- 1976–1981: Virginia (assistant)
- 1982–1984: Mississippi State (assistant)
- 1985: Kansas State (interim HC)

Administrative career (AD unless noted)
- 1985–1988: Kansas State (assistant AD)
- 1988–1996: Marshall
- 1996–2003: Wyoming
- 2004–2009: UAB (assistant AD)
- 2009–2021: North Florida

Head coaching record
- Overall: 1–8

Lee Moon is an American former college football coach and athletics administrator. Following the resignation of Jim Dickey, Moon served as the interim head football coach at Kansas State University during the 1985 football season, posting a record of 1–8. Moon later served as athletic director at Marshall University, the University of Wyoming, and the University of North Florida.

== Head coaching record ==
Year	Team	Overall	Conference	Standing
Kansas State Wildcats (Big Eight Conference) (1985)
1985	Kansas State	1–8 (Note: Moon served as interim head coach after Jim Dickey resigned during the season.)	1–6	T–7th
Kansas State:		1–8	1–6	
Total:		1–8		
