= Eric Mitchel =

American football player (born 1967)

No. 21, 31
- Positions: Running back, slotback

Personal information
- Born: February 13, 1967 (age 59); Pine Bluff, Arkansas, U.S.
- Listed height: 6 ft 0 in (1.83 m)
- Listed weight: 212 lb (96 kg)

Career information
- High school: Pine Bluff
- College: Oklahoma (1985–1988)
- NFL draft: 1989: 6th round, 165th overall pick

Career history
- New England Patriots (1989)*; Los Angeles Raiders (1990)*; Orlando Thunder (1991); Dallas Cowboys (1991)*; Calgary Stampeders (1991–1993); Edmonton Eskimos (1993); Las Vegas Posse (1994)*; Winnipeg Blue Bombers (1995)
- * Offseason or practice squad member only

Awards and highlights
- 2× Grey Cup champion (1992, 1993); Second-team All-World League (1991); National champion (1985)

Career CFL statistics
- Games played: 15
- Rushing yards: 492
- Rushing touchdowns: 6
- Receptions: 29
- Receiving yards: 460
- Receiving touchdowns: 1
- Return yards: 766

Eric Von-Russell Mitchel (born February 13, 1967) is an American former professional football running back and slotback who played for the Calgary Stampeders, Edmonton Eskimos and Winnipeg Blue Bombers of the Canadian Football League (CFL). He played college football for the Oklahoma Sooners.

== Early life ==
Mitchel was born on February 13, 1967, in Pine Bluff, Arkansas. He attended Pine Bluff High School in Pine Bluff. Mitchel accumulated 4,266 yards and ran or passed for 56 touchdowns in three seasons. He earned Parade All-American honors. Mitchel signed a National Letter of Intent to play college football at the University of Oklahoma.

== College career ==
Mitchel played college football for the Oklahoma Sooners from 1985 to 1988 and was a four-year letterman. He played his first two seasons at quarterback seeing little playing time, only completing nine of 26 passes for 223 yards and four touchdowns with 282 rushing yards and two rushing touchdowns.

Mitchel transitioned to running back for his final two years, where he rushed for 593 yards and four touchdowns with three receptions for 30 yards.

== Professional career ==
=== New England Patriots ===
Mitchel was selected in the sixth round, with the 165th overall selection, by the New England Patriots in the 1989 NFL draft. On September 5, he was waived and signed to the practice squad the following day. On September 14, Mitchel was released by the team.

=== Los Angeles Raiders ===
In 1990, Mitchel spent the offseason with the Los Angeles Raiders where he lined up at safety. On August 15, he was released .

=== Orlando Thunder ===
On February 16, 1991, Mitchel was selected in the second round by the Orlando Thunder in the 1991 WLAF draft. In ten games, he rushed for 281 yards and three touchdowns with 26 receptions for 312 yards and one touchdown. Mitchel also had 276 return yards and one touchdown with one pass for 53 yards and a touchdown. For his efforts, he was named to the second-team All-World League team.

=== Dallas Cowboys ===
On July 18, 1991, Mitchel signed with the Dallas Cowboys. On August 2, he was waived by the team.

=== Calgary Stampeders ===
On October 8, 1991, Mitchel was signed by the Calgary Stampeders of the Canadian Football League (CFL). He played in his first cold weather game on October 27 against the Edmonton Eskimos and was caught modifying his cleats to gain better traction. Mitchel played in three games his rookie year, where he rushed for 83 yards and one touchdown with 11 catches for 181 yards and a touchdown.

On February 18, 1992, the Stampeders sign Mitchel to a two-year contract. He split time with Keyvan Jenkins in the backfield and rushed for 310 yards and five touchdowns while he caught 24 passes for 258 yards in eight games. Mitchel was a member of the Stampeders as they defeated the Winnipeg Blue Bombers in the 80th Grey Cup. In the 1993 offseason, he was moved to wide receiver but did not make the team and after getting treatment for a knee injury, he was released.

=== Edmonton Eskimos ===
On Monday 19, 1993, Mitchel was signed by the Edmonton Eskimos. He was used as a reserve slotback in three games for the Eskimos where he returned eight kickoffs for 232 yards. Mitchel won the 81st Grey Cup as a member of the team.

=== Las Vegas Posse ===
On February 11, 1994, Mitchel was signed by the Las Vegas Posse. He was released without playing for the team.

=== Winnipeg Blue Bombers ===
Before the 1995 training camps started, Mitchel signed with the Winnipeg Blue Bombers. He suffered a neck injury which limited him during that time and was moved to the practice roster to open the year. Mitchel only played in one game against the Birmingham Barracudas, rushing 14 times for 99 yards. He was replaced initially by Mike Oliphant and then when Blaise Bryant was signed by the Blue Bombers, Mitchel left the team amid a disagreement with an assistant coach.
