= 1985 Iowa State Cyclones football team =

American college football season

1985 Iowa State Cyclones football
- Conference: Big Eight Conference
- Record: 5–6 (3–4 Big 8)
- Head coach: Jim Criner (3rd season)
- Defensive coordinator: Phil Bennett (1st season)
- Home stadium: Cyclone Stadium

1985 Big Eight Conference football standings
	Conf.					Overall
Team	W		L		T	W		L		T
No. 1 Oklahoma $	7	–	0	–	0	11	–	1	–	0
No. 11 Nebraska	6	–	1	–	0	9	–	3	–	0
Oklahoma State	4	–	3	–	0	8	–	4	–	0
Colorado	4	–	3	–	0	7	–	5	–	0
Iowa State	3	–	4	–	0	5	–	6	–	0
Kansas	2	–	5	–	0	6	–	6	–	0
Kansas State	1	–	6	–	0	1	–	10	–	0
Missouri	1	–	6	–	0	1	–	10	–	0
$ – Conference champion; Rankings from AP Poll

The 1985 Iowa State Cyclones football team represented Iowa State University as a member of the Big Eight Conference during the 1985 NCAA Division I-A football season. Led by third-year head coach Jim Criner, the Cyclones compiled an overall record of 5–6 with a mark of 3–4 in conference play, placing fifth in the Big 8. Iowa State played home games at Cyclone Stadium in Ames, Iowa.

== Schedule ==
Date	Time	Opponent	Site	TV	Result	Attendance	Source
September 14	1:30 pm	Utah State*	Cyclone Stadium; Ames, IA		W 10–3	42,455	
September 21	1:30 pm	Vanderbilt*	Cyclone Stadium; Ames, IA		W 20–17	44,025	
September 28	2:30 pm	No. 3 Iowa*	Cyclone Stadium; Ames, IA (rivalry)	ABC	L 3–57	53,202	
October 5	1:30 pm	Drake*	Cyclone Stadium; Ames, IA		L 17–20	42,008	
October 12	11:40 am	Kansas^{†}	Cyclone Stadium; Ames, IA	Raycom	W 22–21	43,117	
October 19	1:30 pm	Colorado	Cyclone Stadium; Ames, IA		L 6–40	41,215	
October 26	1:30 pm	at No. 10 Oklahoma	Oklahoma Memorial Stadium; Norman, OK		L 14–59	74,207	
November 2	1:30 pm	Missouri	Cyclone Stadium; Ames, IA (rivalry)		L 27–28	40,015	
November 9	1:30 pm	at No. 3 Nebraska	Memorial Stadium; Lincoln, NE (rivalry)		L 0–49	75,920	
November 16	1:30 pm	at Kansas State	KSU Stadium; Manhattan, KS (rivalry)		W 21–14	17,500	
November 23	1:00 pm	No. 7 Oklahoma State	Cyclone Stadium; Ames, IA		W 15–10	40,025	
*Non-conference game; ^{†}Homecoming; Rankings from AP Poll released prior to the game; All times are in Central time

== Game summaries ==
=== Iowa ===
#3 Iowa at Iowa State

Team	1	2	3	4	Total
• No. 3 Hawkeyes	7	34	16	0	57
Cyclones	0	0	0	3	3

- Date: September 28
- Location: Jack Trice Stadium, Ames, Iowa
- Game start: 2:30 p.m. EDT
- Elapsed time: 3:25
- Game attendance: 53,202
- Game weather: 54 °F (12 °C), Wind NE 15 miles per hour (24 km/h)
- Referee: Vance Carlson
- TV announcers (ABC): Al Michaels, Lee Grosscup, and Al Trautwig

Scoring summary
1	4:11	IOWA	Fred Bush 4-yard run (Houghtlin kick)	IOWA 7-0
2	14:05	IOWA	Rob Houghtlin 47-yard field goal	IOWA 10-0
2	8:55	IOWA	R. Harmon 2-yard run (Houghtlin kick)	IOWA 17-0
2	6:59	IOWA	R. Harmon 23-yard run (Houghtlin kick)	IOWA 24-0
2	2:48	IOWA	Rob Houghtlin 41-yard field goal	IOWA 27-0
2	1:47	IOWA	Mike Flagg 3-yard pass from Chuck Long (Houghtlin kick)	IOWA 34-0
2	0:47	IOWA	Smith 9-yard pass from Chuck Long (Houghtlin kick)	IOWA 41-0
3	13:19	IOWA	Scott Helverson 46-yard pass from Chuck Long (kick failed)	IOWA 47-0
3	9:37	IOWA	Rob Houghtlin 27-yard field goal	IOWA 50-0
3	2:33	IOWA	Scott Helverson 26-yard pass from Vlassic (Cook kick)	IOWA 57-0
4	5:21	ISU	Frank 52-yard field goal	IOWA 57-3

=== At Oklahoma ===
Iowa State at #10 Oklahoma

Team	1	2	3	4	Total
Cyclones	7	0	0	7	14
• No. 10 Sooners	10	21	21	7	59

- Date: October 26
- Location: Oklahoma Memorial Stadium
- Game attendance: 70,124

=== At Nebraska ===
Iowa State at #3 Nebraska

Team	1	2	3	4	Total
Cyclones	0	0	0	0	0
• No. 3 Cornhuskers	7	14	21	7	49

- Date: November 9
- Location: Memorial Stadium, Lincoln, Nebraska
- Game attendance: 75,920

=== Oklahoma State ===
#7 Oklahoma State at Iowa State

Team	1	2	3	4	Total
No. 7 Cowboys	0	3	7	0	10
• Cyclones	9	3	0	3	15

- Date: November 23
- Location: Jack Trice Stadium, Ames, Iowa
- Game attendance: 40,025

Scoring summary
1		ISU	Frank 23-yard field goal	ISU 3–0
1		ISU	Hughes Suffren 13-yard pass from Alex Espinoza (kick failed)	ISU 9–0
2		OSU	Brad Dennis 39-yard field goal	ISU 9–3
2	1:52	ISU	Franks 30-yard field goal	ISU 12–3
3	11:29	OSU	Ronnie Williams 1-yard run (Dennis kick)	ISU 12–10
4	11:30	ISU	Frank 34-yard field goal	ISU 15–10

== Personnel ==
1985 Iowa State Cyclones football team roster
Players			Coaches
Offense: Pos. / # / Name / Class; QB / 11 / Alex Espinoza / Jr	Defense: Pos. / # / Name / Class	Special teams: Pos. / # / Name / Class	Head coach: Jim Criner; Coordinators/assistant coaches Legend: (C) Team captain; (S) Suspended; (I) Ineligible; Injured; Redshirt
