= John Washington (American football) =

American football player (born 1963)

No. 73, 76
- Positions: Defensive end, defensive tackle

Personal information
- Born: February 20, 1963 (age 63); Houston, Texas, U.S.
- Listed height: 6 ft 4 in (1.93 m)
- Listed weight: 280 lb (127 kg)

Career information
- High school: Sterling Aviation (Houston)
- College: Oklahoma State
- NFL draft: 1986: 3rd round, 73rd overall pick

Career history
- New York Giants (1986–1992); Atlanta Falcons (1992); New England Patriots (1993)

Awards and highlights
- 2× Super Bowl champion (XXI, XXV); 2× Second-team All-Big Eight (1984, 1985)

Career NFL statistics
- Sacks: 1
- Fumble recoveries: 2
- Stats at Pro Football Reference

John Earl Washington (born February 20, 1963) is an American former professional football player who was a defensive end in the National Football League (NFL) between 1986 and 1993 for the New York Giants and the New England Patriots. He played college football at Oklahoma State University and was selected in the third round of the 1986 NFL draft with the 73rd overall pick.

One of his biggest contributions to the game while playing for the Giants was making a goal line stand in a 1990 divisional playoff game versus the Chicago Bears. On 4th and goal at the Giants' 1 yard line, Washington eluded a blocker and stuffed fullback Brad Muster. His stop prevented the Bears from cutting into the Giants' 10-0 second quarter lead and the Giants cruised the rest of the way to a 31–3 victory en route to their second Super Bowl championship.
