= Jeff Hurd (American football) =

American football player (born 1964)

No. 52, 58
- Position: Linebacker

Personal information
- Born: May 25, 1964 (age 62); Monroe, Louisiana, U.S.
- Listed height: 6 ft 2 in (1.88 m)
- Listed weight: 245 lb (111 kg)

Career information
- High school: Kansas City (MO) Lincoln Prep
- College: Kansas State
- NFL draft: 1987: undrafted

Career history
- Dallas Cowboys (1987–1989); Dallas Texans (1990–1991)

Career NFL statistics
- Games played: 5
- Stats at Pro Football Reference

Career AFL statistics
- Tackles: 44
- Sacks: 1.5
- Blocked kicks: 3
- Fumble recoveries: 4
- Stats at ArenaFan.com

Jeffrey Tonja Hurd (born May 25, 1964) is an American former professional football player who was a linebacker in the National Football League (NFL) for the Dallas Cowboys. He also was a member of the Dallas Texans in the Arena Football League (AFL). He played college football for the Kansas State Wildcats.

== Early life ==
Hurd attended Lincoln College Preparatory Academy, in Kansas City, Missouri, where he participated in football, basketball, and baseball. He received Kansas City prep athlete of the year honors as a senior.

He accepted a football scholarship from Kansas State University. He was a reserve linebacker in his first two seasons. As a junior, he was named a starter at defensive end, registering 62 tackles and 4 sacks. As a senior, he was moved to defensive tackle, posting 57 tackles and 5 sacks.

He pitched for the baseball team as a freshman, compiling an 0-1 record with a 3.5 ERA.

== Professional career ==
=== Dallas Cowboys ===
Hurd was signed as an undrafted free agent by the Dallas Cowboys after the 1987 NFL draft and was moved to linebacker. He was waived on August 17.

After the NFLPA strike was declared on the third week of the 1987 season, those contests were canceled (reducing the 16 game season to 15) and the NFL decided that the games would be played with replacement players. He was re-signed to be a part of the Dallas replacement team that was given the mock name "Rhinestone Cowboys" by the media. He was a backup at right outside linebacker behind Chris Duliban. He was released on October 26, at the end of the strike. He was re-signed for the last 2 games.

In 1988, he injured his left knee and was placed on the injured reserve list. In 1989, he was switched to defensive end and was placed on the injured reserve list with a right knee injury on August 28. He wasn't re-signed after the season.

=== Dallas Texans (AFL) ===
In 1990, he signed with the Dallas Texans of the Arena Football League. He had 12 tackles and 1.5 sacks. In 1991, he collected 32 tackles, 4 fumble recoveries and 3 blocked kicks.
