= Garrett Limbrick =

American football player (born 1965)

No. 32
- Position: Running back

Personal information
- Born: November 6, 1965 (age 61); Houston, Texas, U.S.
- Listed height: 6 ft 2 in (1.88 m)
- Listed weight: 240 lb (109 kg)

Career information
- High school: Northbrook (Houston)
- College: Oklahoma State
- NFL draft: 1989: undrafted

Career history
- Chicago Bears (1989)*; Philadelphia Eagles (1989)*; Miami Dolphins (1990–1991)
- * Offseason or practice squad member only

Career NFL statistics
- Rushing yards: 14
- Rushing average: 2.8
- Receptions: 4
- Receiving yards: 23
- Stats at Pro Football Reference

Garrett Limbrick (born November 6, 1965) is an American former professional football player who was a running back for the Miami Dolphins of the National Football League (NFL) in 1990. He played college football for the Oklahoma State Cowboys.
