= Bobby Riley =

American football player (born 1964)

No. 19
- Position: Wide receiver

Personal information
- Born: October 17, 1964 (age 62); Nowata, Oklahoma, U.S.
- Listed height: 5 ft 8 in (1.73 m)
- Listed weight: 168 lb (76 kg)

Career information
- High school: Casa Grande Union (Casa Grande, Arizona)
- College: Oklahoma State
- NFL draft: 1987: undrafted

Career history
- Atlanta Falcons (1987)*; New York Jets (1987–1988)
- * Offseason or practice squad member only

Awards and highlights
- Second-team All-Big Eight (1985)
- Stats at Pro Football Reference

Robert Riley (born October 17, 1964) is an American former professional football wide receiver who played in one game. He played for the New York Jets. He played in one game before being suspended for steroid use. He did not play afterwards.
