= Sonny Brown (American football) =

American football player (born 1963)

No. 27
- Position: Safety

Personal information
- Born: November 12, 1963 (age 63); Tinker Air Force Base, Oklahoma, U.S.

Career information
- College: Oklahoma

Career history
- Houston Oilers (1987)

Awards and highlights
- National champion (1985); 2× Second-team All-Big Eight (1985, 1986)

Career statistics
- Games played: 2
- Games started: 0
- Stats at Pro Football Reference

Clifton D. "Sonny" Brown (born November 12, 1963) is an American former professional football player who was a safety for the Houston Oilers of the National Football League (NFL) in 1987. He played college football for the Oklahoma Sooners, who won a national championship in 1985. Brown was named the MVP of the Orange Bowl in 1986 that earned the Sooners the national title. He attended high school at Alice High School in Alice, Texas.

== NFL career ==
Due to the players strike, Brown played in only 2 games of the 1987 NFL season and recorded no stats.
