= Bill Lewis (center) =

American football player (born 1963)

No. 51, 75
- Position: Center

Personal information
- Born: July 12, 1963 (age 63); Sioux City, Iowa, U.S.
- Listed height: 6 ft 6 in (1.98 m)
- Listed weight: 285 lb (129 kg)

Career information
- High school: Sioux City (IA) East
- College: Nebraska
- NFL draft: 1986: 7th round, 191st overall pick

Career history
- Los Angeles Raiders (1986–1989); Phoenix Cardinals (1990–1992); New England Patriots (1993); Denver Broncos (1995)*; Memphis Mad Dogs (1995)
- * Offseason or practice squad member only

Awards and highlights
- First-team All-American (1985); First-team All-Big Eight (1985)

Career NFL statistics
- Games played: 71
- Games started: 63
- Fumble recoveries: 12
- Stats at Pro Football Reference

William Glenn Lewis (born July 12, 1963) is an American former professional football player who was a center for eight seasons in the National Football League (NFL).

Lewis was born and raised in Sioux City, Iowa, and played scholastically at Sioux City East High School. He played collegiately at Nebraska, where he was a first-team All-American as a senior.

Lewis was selected by the Los Angeles Raiders in the seventh round of the 1986 NFL draft. He spent four years with the Raiders, followed by three years with the Phoenix Cardinals, and one year with the New England Patriots.

His son, Alex Lewis, later also played at Nebraska before being drafted by the Baltimore Ravens in the 2016 NFL draft.
