= Darrell Wallace (Canadian football) =

American football player

Profile
- Position: Running back

Personal information
- Listed height: 5 ft 7 in (1.70 m)
- Listed weight: 168 lb (76 kg)

Career information
- College: University of Missouri

Career history
- 1989–1990: BC Lions
- 1990: Calgary Stampeders
- 1991*: Detroit Lions
- 1993–1994: Saskatchewan Roughriders
- 1995: Birmingham Barracudas

Awards and highlights
- Jackie Parker Trophy (1989); 2× Second-team All-Big Eight (1985, 1986); University of Missouri Athletics Hall of Fame (1997)

Darrell Wallace is an American former professional football player who was a running back in the Canadian Football League (CFL).

A graduate of the University of Missouri, where he played between 1984 and 1987, he rushed for 2607 career yards, with 1120 coming in 1985 and 872 in 1986. He was inducted into the University of Missouri Athletics Hall of Fame in 1997.

He signed with the British Columbia Lions of the CFL in 1989 and had a great rookie season, being second in the league in total offensive yardage. He led the team with a new club record of 1225 kickoff return yards, added a team high 780 punt return yards, and had a season high 189 yards rushing versus the Saskatchewan Roughriders on August 24, 1989. All of this won him the Jackie Parker Trophy as West Division rookie of the year.

Wallace played parts of the 1990 season with the Lions and the Calgary Stampeders. He was signed by the Detroit Lions of the National Football League and spent 1991 and 1992 on their practice squad. He returned to the CFL to play for the Saskatchewan Roughriders from 1993 to 1994 and the Birmingham Barracudas in 1995.
