= Mark Moore (American football) =

American football player (born 1964)

No. 35, 25, 77
- Position: Defensive back

Personal information
- Born: September 3, 1964 (age 62); Nacogdoches, Texas, U.S.
- Listed height: 6 ft 0 in (1.83 m)
- Listed weight: 194 lb (88 kg)

Career information
- High school: Nacogdoches
- College: Oklahoma State
- NFL draft: 1987: 4th round, 104th overall pick

Career history
- Seattle Seahawks (1987); San Diego Chargers (1989)*; New York/New Jersey Knights (1991); Calgary Stampeders (1991); New York/New Jersey Knights (1992)
- * Offseason or practice squad member only

Awards and highlights
- 2× First-team All-American (1985, 1986); 3× First-team All-Big Eight (1984, 1985, 1986)
- Stats at Pro Football Reference

Mark Quentin Moore (born September 3, 1964) is an American former professional football player who was a defensive back in the National Football League (NFL), World League of American Football (WLAF) and Canadian Football League (CFL).

Moore was born and raised in Nacogdoches, Texas and played scholastically at Nacogdoches High School. He played collegiately for the Oklahoma State Cowboys, where he was twice selected by the Associated Press as a first-team All-American.

Moore was selected by the Seattle Seahawks in the fourth round of the 1987 NFL draft. He was with the Seahawks for one season, appearing in five games. He spent the 1991 and 1992 WLAF seasons with the New York/New Jersey Knights, recording 3 interceptions in 1992, returning one 29 yards for a touchdown. In between WLAF seasons, Moore appeared in one game with the Calgary Stampeders of the CFL.
