= Tim Lashar =

American football player (born 1964)

No. 16
- Position: Placekicker

Personal information
- Born: September 5, 1964 (age 62); Santa Monica, California, U.S.
- Listed height: 5 ft 9 in (1.75 m)
- Listed weight: 160 lb (73 kg)

Career information
- High school: Plano (TX); Barrington (IL)
- College: Oklahoma
- NFL draft: 1987: undrafted

Career history
- Los Angeles Rams (1987)*; Chicago Bears (1987–1988); San Antonio Force (1992)
- * Offseason or practice squad member only

Awards and highlights
- National champion (1985); First-team All-Big Eight (1986); Orange Bowl MVP–National Championship (1985)

Career NFL statistics
- Field goals made: 3
- Field goal attempts: 4
- Field goal %: 75
- Longest field goal: 27
- Stats at Pro Football Reference

Timothy Alan Lashar (born September 5, 1964) is an American former professional football player who was a placekicker in the National Football League (NFL). He played college football for the Oklahoma Sooners.

== Early life ==
Lashar was born in Santa Monica, California, and moved several times growing up. He started high school in Barrington, Illinois, and attended Barrington High School. He moved to Texas and graduated from Plano Senior High School in Plano in 1982. Lashar was lightly recruited in high school and enrolled at the University of Oklahoma as a walk-on over a similar offer from Arkansas.

== College career ==
Lashar joined the Oklahoma Sooners as a walk-on and redshirted as a true freshman in 1982. He served as the primary kicker for the team for the next four seasons, including the 1985 national championship team. Lashar was named Orange Bowl Most Valuable Player in the 1985 National Championship game, kicking four field goals - an Orange Bowl record at the time.

As a senior in 1986, Lashar made 12 of 15 field goal attempts and made all 66 extra points attempted and was named first-team All-Big Eight Conference. He finished his collegiate career with a then-school record 48 field goal attempts and scored 321 points.

== Professional career ==
Lashar was signed by the Los Angeles Rams as an undrafted free agent in 1987 but was cut during training camp. He was signed by the Chicago Bears as a replacement player during the 1987 NFL players strike, playing in three games and was released when the strike ended. Lashar was re-signed by the Bears during the 1988 preseason but was again cut during training camp.

== Personal ==
Lashar owns Lashar Home Comfort Systems, a heating and air conditioning business in Norman, Oklahoma.

Lashar's brother, R.D., was also a kicker at Oklahoma.
