= Tony Casillas =

American football player (born 1963)

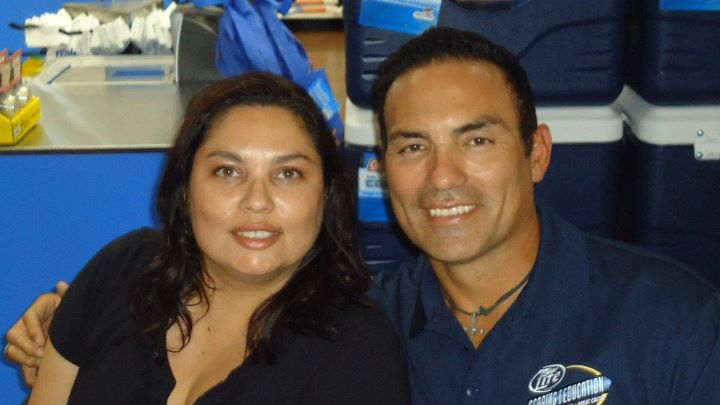
- Casillas with a fan prior to a Cowboys home game in 2011.

No. 75, 92
- Position: Defensive tackle

Personal information
- Born: October 26, 1963 (age 63); Tulsa, Oklahoma, U.S.
- Listed height: 6 ft 3 in (1.91 m)
- Listed weight: 278 lb (126 kg)

Career information
- High school: East Central (Tulsa)
- College: Oklahoma
- NFL draft: 1986: 1st round, 2nd overall pick

Career history
- Atlanta Falcons (1986–1990); Dallas Cowboys (1991–1993); Kansas City Chiefs (1994)*; New York Jets (1994–1995); Dallas Cowboys (1996–1997)
- * Offseason or practice squad member only

Awards and highlights
- 2× Super Bowl champion (XXVII, XXVIII); Second-team All-Pro (1989); PFWA All-Rookie Team (1986); National champion (1985); Lombardi Award (1985); UPI Lineman of the Year (1985); 2× Consensus All-American (1984, 1985); 2× First-team All-Big Eight (1984, 1985)

Career NFL statistics
- Tackles: 768
- Sacks: 23
- Fumble recoveries: 9
- Forced fumbles: 10
- Stats at Pro Football Reference
- College Football Hall of Fame

Tony Steven Casillas (born October 26, 1963) is an American former professional football player who was a defensive tackle in the National Football League (NFL) from 1986 through 1997. He played college football for the Oklahoma Sooners, winning an NCAA national championship in 1985, when he also won the Lombardi Award and was the UPI Lineman of the Year. Casillas was also part of the Dallas Cowboys back to back victories in Super Bowl XXVII and XXVIII, both against the Buffalo Bills. In 2004, he was inducted into the College Football Hall of Fame.

== Early life ==
Casillas, of Mexican and Cherokee descent, was born in Tulsa, Oklahoma, on October 16, 1963. He attended Tulsa East Central High School where he was an All-State player.

He had a difficult start to his college football career. As a redshirt freshman he suffered an ankle injury, contracted mononucleosis and was lost for the entire season. The next year, he played sparingly at defensive tackle, registering only 10 tackles.

In 1984, Casillas was moved to nose guard and became a starter, receiving consensus All-American and first-team All-Conference honors.

In 1985, he became only the second Sooner ever to win the Lombardi Award, which is given to the nation's top lineman. He was named the UPI Lineman of the Year, the Big Eight Conference defensive player of the year, a consensus first team All-American and first team All-Conference. He ended his college career with 18 sacks and 213 career tackles in addition to graduating with Academic All-American honors in 1985, and a degree in public relations.

In 2004, Casillas became the second Hispanic (his father is Mexican and his mother comes from Irish and Native American descent) to be inducted into the College Football Hall of Fame.

The National Football Foundation named Casillas the College Defensive Player of the Decade for the 1980s. In 2008, he was inducted into the Oklahoma Sports Hall of Fame.

Casillas was inducted in to the Oklahoma Hispanic Hall of Fame on March 13, 2025 at a ceremony at Oklahoma City Community College in South Oklahoma City. He was introduced by his former coach Barry Switzer and gave the keynote address at the event.

== Professional career ==
=== Atlanta Falcons ===
Casillas was selected second overall in the first round of the 1986 NFL draft by the Atlanta Falcons. The team was switching to a 3-4 defense, so they needed him to be their nose tackle, he responded by becoming a starter as a rookie and making 111 tackles and a sack. He also made the league's all-rookie team. The next year, he suffered a stress fracture of his left fibula and was placed on the injured reserve list.

In the strike-shortened 1987 season, he played just nine games and had 72 tackles.

During the 1988 preseason, he left camp for three weeks to get guidance from a psychologist, suffering he said, from the stress of playing in professional football. He returned to the team with a new attitude and in time to start the regular season, where he made 111 tackles and was named a Pro Bowl alternate.

He exploded in 1989, becoming one of the best players at his position in the league with 152 tackles (still a team record for a defensive lineman) and was named second-team All-Pro and a Pro Bowl alternate.

In 1990, he held out in a contract dispute from head coach Jerry Glanville's first Falcons training camp, causing him to lose his starting job to rookie Tory Epps. The problems escalated from there on, he eventually missed a 44–24 loss to the Los Angeles Rams after failing to catch the team flight. The Falcons suspended him for two weeks without pay. Between injuries and discipline incidents, he only played in nine games as a backup.

At the start of the 1991 season, he announced he was retiring, so the Falcons traded him to the Dallas Cowboys for second, and eighth round draft choices in the 1992 NFL draft. During his five-year span in Atlanta, Casillas had 478 tackles, the most ever by any Falcons defensive lineman and fourth best overall in franchise history.

=== Dallas Cowboys (first stint) ===
The Dallas Cowboys welcomed Casillas to training camp with the news that he would play left tackle in a 4–3 defense where the No. 1 overall draft pick Russell Maryland was also going to play. He eventually won the starting spot and became part of the best defense and the best defensive-line rotation in the NFL.

His career was revived in Dallas as a specialist at stopping the run. He also was a part of back to back victories in Super Bowl XXVII and XXVIII against the Buffalo Bills two years in a row. Casillas left the team via free agency to join the Kansas City Chiefs for the 1994 season.

=== Kansas City Chiefs ===
He immediately started having problems with the Kansas City Chiefs in mini-camp, practicing only sporadically, saying that he had a problem with high blood pressure.

On the eve of training camp, he told coach Marty Schottenheimer he was concerned about his health. Eventually, the Chiefs released him, forcing him to return his signing bonus. Their general manager, Carl Peterson, asked the league to investigate whether the Cowboys had tampered, after the Cowboys hired Barry Switzer (Casillas's former coach at Oklahoma).

As part of Casillas's release from the Chiefs, he agreed that he would not sign in 1994 with any of the other AFC West divisional rivals or with the Dallas Cowboys.

=== New York Jets ===
In 1994, he signed with the New York Jets after a bizarre spring and summer in which he practiced only sporadically in minicamp with the Chiefs and was eventually released by the team. In the two years he spent with the team, he dealt with injuries that caused him to only start 16 games. He was waived on March 2, 1996.

=== Dallas Cowboys (second stint) ===
Casillas rejoined the Dallas Cowboys in a reserve role for the 1996 season, which was the only season in his career where he failed to record a sack. In 1997, he started 14 games in place of a suspended Leon Lett, matching his career high total of 3 sacks. He retired from professional football on February 25, 1998, after playing in the NFL for 12 seasons.

== Personal life ==
Casillas was the host of "Casillas & Company"/"Casillas & Zack," a sports talk show on Oklahoma City radio station 107.7 The Franchise KRXO from August 2013 until his departure from the station in November 2014.
