= Brian Washington =

American football player (born 1965)

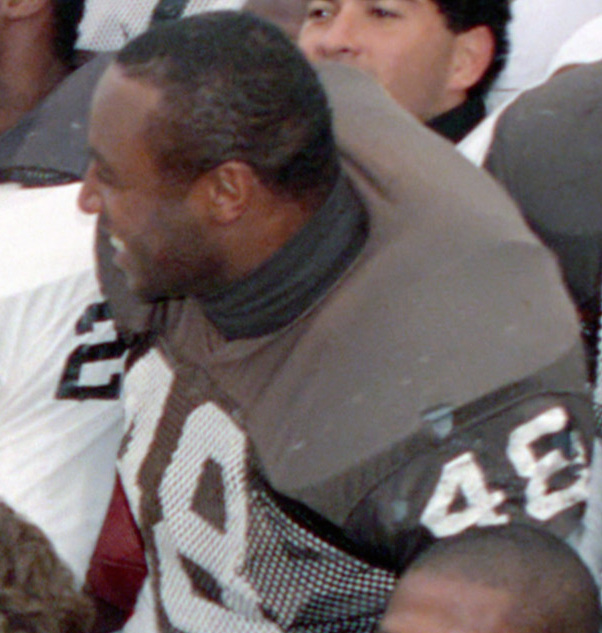
- Washington with the Cleveland Browns in 1988

No. 48, 29
- Position: Safety

Personal information
- Born: September 10, 1965 (age 61); Richmond, Virginia, U.S.
- Listed height: 6 ft 1 in (1.85 m)
- Listed weight: 210 lb (95 kg)

Career information
- High school: Highland Springs (VA)
- College: Nebraska
- NFL draft: 1988: 10th round, 272nd overall pick

Career history
- Cleveland Browns (1988); New York Jets (1989–1994); Kansas City Chiefs (1995–1996)

Awards and highlights
- Second-team All-Big Eight (1985)

Career NFL statistics
- Interceptions: 27
- Sacks: 5
- Touchdowns: 4
- Stats at Pro Football Reference

Brian Wayne Washington (born September 10, 1965) is an American former professional football player who was a safety in the National Football League (NFL). He played for the Cleveland Browns (1988), New York Jets (1990–1994), and Kansas City Chiefs (1995–1996). He played college football for the Nebraska Cornhuskers and was selected by the Browns in the 10th round of the 1988 NFL draft with the 272nd overall pick. He was named New York Jets Team MVP and Football Digest's All-Pro First Team for his play in the 1992 season.

Washington's daughter, Rachael Washington, won The 2019 Ringmaster's Championship (formally known as Golden Gloves) in the F-165 weight class, in New York City. In 2019, Washington placed second in The Eastern National qualifier of which qualified her for The 2020 Olympic Trials in St. Charles Louisiana.

Washington's daughter Samantha Washington was Miss Nebraska's Outstanding Teen 2013, named Miss Nebraska Teen USA 2017, and a contestant in season 28 of The Bachelor in 2024.
