= Brian Blankenship =

American football player (born 1963)

No. 60
- Position: Guard

Personal information
- Born: April 7, 1963; Omaha, Nebraska, U.S.
- Listed height: 6 ft 1 in (1.85 m)
- Listed weight: 286 lb (130 kg)

Career information
- High school: Bellevue (NE) Gross
- College: Nebraska
- NFL draft: 1986: undrafted

Career history
- Pittsburgh Steelers (1986)*; Indianapolis Colts (1987)*; Pittsburgh Steelers (1987–1991)
- * Offseason or practice squad member only

Awards and highlights
- First-team All-Big Eight (1985)

Career NFL statistics
- Games played: 61
- Games started: 38
- Fumble recoveries: 1
- Stats at Pro Football Reference

Brian Blankenship (born April 7, 1963) is an American former professional football player who spent his entire career as a guard for the Pittsburgh Steelers of the National Football League (NFL). He played college football for the Nebraska Cornhuskers.

== Career ==
Blankenship played five seasons for the Pittsburgh Steelers.

Upon joining the Steelers in 1987, Blankenship was in line to assume the role of successor to long-time Steelers center Mike Webster. Blankenship, who had played beside Webster, compared the experience of playing beside Webster like "going back to school" and "like having your big brother there in a fight".

In week thirteen of the 1987 season, Blankenship and fellow guard John Rienstra were playing on special teams when they were lined up against newly drafted Seattle Seahawks linebacker Brian Bosworth. Bosworth, at the time was famous for his flamboyant attitude and rat-tail hairstyle, was double-teamed on a first-quarter kickoff by both Blankenship and Rienstra when Blankenship reached behind Bosworth's helmet and ripped the tail from Bosworth's head and took it to the Steelers' sideline as a "trophy". When asked if he kept the trophy, Blankenship responded "I threw it away with all the other trash. It was Bosworth’s, it ain’t worth nothing." The estimated two-foot tail was compared to "a Neo-Nazi thing...made of twine". Blankenship then compared Bosworth's rat-tail as an item used to distract from his lack of talent, something that followed him since college.

A neck injury in the fourth week of the 1991 NFL season against the New England Patriots forced Blankenship to miss the remaining 13 games of the season. Blankenship had actually verbally agreed to a new contract a day earlier, but never signed the paperwork. After informing Steelers President Dan Rooney of his injury, Rooney wished him well, thanked him for his service, and allowed Blankenship to go "across the hall to get taken care of."
