= Demise Williams =

American football player (born 1964)

No. 33
- Position: Safety

Personal information
- Born: July 9, 1964 (age 62); Greenville, South Carolina, U.S.
- Listed height: 6 ft 1 in (1.85 m)
- Listed weight: 225 lb (102 kg)

Career information
- High school: Anacostia (Washington, D.C.)
- College: Oklahoma State (1982–1986)
- NFL draft: 1987: undrafted

Career history
- Los Angeles Raiders (1987)
- Stats at Pro Football Reference

Demise Lamar Williams (born July 9, 1964) (pronounced like "release") is an American former professional football safety who played for the Los Angeles Raiders of the National Football League (NFL). He played college football for the Oklahoma State Cowboys.

== Early life ==
Demise Lamar Williams was born on July 9, 1964, in Greenville, South Carolina. He played high school football at Anacostia High School in Washington, D.C. as a defensive back. He recorded nine interceptions and three fumble recoveries as a senior in 1981, earning Parade All-American honors.

== College career ==
In February 1982, Williams committed to Oklahoma State University to play college football for the Cowboys. He redshirted the 1982 season. In 1983, he played for the junior varsity team as a tailback and free safety. Williams was a three-year letterman from 1984 to 1986. He became a starter at cornerback in 1985. He played in 34 games during his varsity career, intercepting four passes for 57 yards.

== Professional career ==
Williams signed with the Los Angeles Raiders after going undrafted in the 1987 NFL draft. He was released on August 5, 1987. On September 23, he was re-signed by the Raiders during the 1987 NFL players strike. Williams was listed as a safety. He played in one game for the Raiders, and was later released.

== Personal life ==
Williams is the nephew of Elgin Baylor.
