= Tom Rathman =

American football player and coach (born 1962)

No. 44
- Position: Fullback

Personal information
- Born: October 7, 1962 (age 64); Grand Island, Nebraska, U.S.
- Listed height: 6 ft 1 in (1.85 m)
- Listed weight: 230 lb (104 kg)

Career information
- High school: Grand Island Senior
- College: Nebraska (1981–1985)
- NFL draft: 1986: 3rd round, 56th overall pick

Career history

Playing
- San Francisco 49ers (1986–1993); Los Angeles Raiders (1994)

Coaching
- San Francisco 49ers (1997–2002) Running backs; Detroit Lions (2003–2005) Running backs; Oakland Raiders (2006–2008) Running backs; San Francisco 49ers (2009–2016) Running backs; Indianapolis Colts (2018–2020) Running backs

Awards and highlights
- 2× Super Bowl champion (XXIII, XXIV); San Francisco 49ers Hall of Fame; Third-team All-American (1985); First-team All-Big Eight (1985)

Career NFL statistics
- Rushing yards: 2,020
- Rushing average: 3.7
- Rushing touchdowns: 26
- Stats at Pro Football Reference

Thomas Dean Rathman (born October 7, 1962) is an American former professional football player who was a fullback for the San Francisco 49ers and Los Angeles Raiders of the National Football League (NFL). He played college football for the Nebraska Cornhuskers. Following his playing career during which he won two Super Bowls, he became a coach in 1995 and coached the 49ers' running backs through the 2016 season. Rathman was later inducted into the 49ers' Hall of Fame.

== Early life ==
Rathman was a three sport athlete at Grand Island High School in Grand Island, Nebraska. Rathman excelled on the football field as a fullback and linebacker. He was nominated first team all-state in 1980. He was also an accomplished track and field athlete, winning the state championship in high jump as a junior in 1980. Rathman has been inducted to the Nebraska High School Sports Hall of Fame.

== College career ==
Rathman was a three-year letter winner in football at the University of Nebraska. He finished his college career with 1,425 rushing yards, and averaged over six yards per carry. Often considered the greatest fullback in modern Nebraska history, Rathman set several school position records, some of which still stand, including most yards rushing by a fullback in a single season (881, in 1985) and most career rushing touchdowns by a fullback (twelve). He was noted for his ability to break long runs, especially during his senior year in 1985, when he averaged 7.5 yards per carry.

== College career statistics ==
Legend
**Bold**	Career high

Year	Team	Games	Rushing				Receiving			
Year	Team	GP	Att	Yds	Avg	TD	Rec	Yds	Avg	TD
1981	Nebraska	11	4	20	5.0	0	0	0	0.0	0
1983	Nebraska	12	26	143	5.5	0	2	26	13.0	1
1984	Nebraska	11	75	381	5.1	4	0	0	0.0	0
1985	Nebraska	11	118	881	7.5	8	3	44	14.7	0
		45	223	1,425	6.4	12	5	70	14.0	1

== Professional career ==
=== San Francisco 49ers ===
Rathman was selected by the 49ers in the third round of the 1986 NFL draft with the 56th overall pick. His professional career spanned nine years as a fullback, the first eight with the 49ers. For the first five seasons, he was the lead blocker for another former Cornhusker, Roger Craig. Rathman helped lead the 49ers to two Super Bowl championships, rushing for 38 yards, catching four passes for 43 yards, and scoring two touchdowns in Super Bowl XXIV. In 1989, he led all NFL running backs in receiving with 73 receptions for 616 yards, and due in large part to his versatility as a pass catcher throughout his career, as well as a blocker and runner, was considered an archetype of an all-around fullback.

=== Los Angeles Raiders ===
Rathman spent his last season in 1994 with the Los Angeles Raiders.

=== Player profile ===
Rathman finished his NFL career with 2,020 rushing yards, 320 receptions for 2,684 yards with a total of 34 touchdowns. Additionally, Rathman had five kickoff returns for 103 yards. Known for his physical playstyle, both as blocker and while running the ball, Rathman suffered numerous injuries during his career, and has had 18 surgeries because of them.

== NFL career statistics ==
Legend
	Won the Super Bowl
**Bold**	Career high

=== Regular season ===
Year	Team	Games		Rushing					Receiving				
Year	Team	GP	GS	Att	Yds	Avg	Lng	TD	Rec	Yds	Avg	Lng	TD
1986	SFO	**16**	1	33	138	**4.2**	29	1	13	121	9.3	14	0
1987	SFO	12	7	62	257	4.1	**35**	1	30	329	**11.0**	29	3
1988	SFO	**16**	**16**	**102**	**427**	**4.2**	26	2	42	382	9.1	24	0
1989	SFO	**16**	**16**	79	305	3.9	13	1	**73**	**616**	8.4	**36**	1
1990	SFO	**16**	**16**	101	318	3.1	22	**7**	48	327	6.8	28	0
1991	SFO	**16**	**16**	63	183	2.9	16	6	34	286	8.4	32	0
1992	SFO	15	15	57	194	3.4	17	5	44	343	7.8	27	**4**
1993	SFO	8	4	19	80	**4.2**	19	3	10	86	8.6	17	0
1994	RAI	**16**	**16**	28	118	**4.2**	14	0	26	194	7.5	18	0
		131	107	544	2,020	3.7	35	26	320	2,684	8.4	36	8

=== Playoffs ===
Year	Team	Games		Rushing					Receiving				
Year	Team	GP	GS	Att	Yds	Avg	Lng	TD	Rec	Yds	Avg	Lng	TD
1986	SFO	1	0	3	8	2.7	5	0	0	0	0.0	0	0
1987	SFO	1	0	1	12	**12.0**	12	0	2	18	9.0	13	0
1988	SFO	**3**	1	18	88	4.9	**22**	1	8	87	**10.9**	**22**	0
1989	SFO	**3**	**3**	**28**	**125**	4.5	18	**2**	**13**	**120**	9.2	18	0
1990	SFO	2	2	5	10	2.0	6	1	4	16	4.0	12	0
1992	SFO	2	2	5	28	5.6	12	0	8	63	7.9	12	0
1993	SFO	2	2	4	16	4.0	6	0	3	23	7.7	9	**1**
		14	10	64	287	4.5	22	4	38	327	8.6	22	1

== Coaching career ==
After retiring as a player, Rathman began his coaching career in 1995 at the high school level, as the running backs coach for Junípero Serra High School in San Mateo. The next year, he served as offensive coordinator at Menlo College in Atherton. He became a pro coach in 1997 when he joined the 49ers staff, and served as running backs coach through 2002. In 2003, he accompanied head coach Steve Mariucci to the Detroit Lions where Rathman was running backs coach during Mariucci's three seasons with the Lions. He then held the same position for the Oakland Raiders for three seasons, and returned to the 49ers as running backs coach on January 7, 2009. Following the departure of head coach Mike Singletary, Rathman was retained by Jim Harbaugh for the 2011 season and was again retained by Jim Tomsula for the 2015 season. After the firing of Tomsula a year later, Rathman was once again retained by new 49ers head coach Chip Kelly for the 2016 season. Following that season, Rathman was not re-hired after Kyle Shanahan was named head coach for the upcoming season. On February 27, 2018, Rathman was hired as the running backs coach for the Indianapolis Colts. On January 28, 2021, the Colts announced Rathman had retired.

== Personal life ==
Rathman currently resides in Redwood Shores, California with his wife Holly, and three daughters, Nicole, Ali, and Samantha.
