= Mike Norseth =

American football player (born 1964)

No. 12, 5
- Position: Quarterback

Personal information
- Born: August 22, 1964 (age 62); Los Angeles, California, U.S.
- Listed height: 6 ft 2 in (1.88 m)
- Listed weight: 200 lb (91 kg)

Career information
- High school: Crescenta Valley (La Crescenta, California)
- College: Kansas
- NFL draft: 1986: 7th round, 174th overall pick

Career history
- Cleveland Browns (1986); Cincinnati Bengals (1987–1988); Cleveland Browns (1989)*; Green Bay Packers (1990); Houston Oilers (1991)*; Birmingham Fire (1992); New York Jets (1992)
- * Offseason or practice squad member only

Awards and highlights
- Second-team All-Big Eight (1985)
- Stats at Pro Football Reference

Mike Norseth (born August 22, 1964) is an American former professional football player who was a quarterback in the National Football League (NFL). He played college football for the Kansas Jayhawks. Norseth was selected by the Cleveland Browns in the seventh round of the 1986 NFL draft with the 174th overall pick. He played for the Cincinnati Bengals in 1988 and for the Birmingham Fire in 1992.
