= Kansas Jayhawks football statistical leaders =

The Kansas Jayhawks football statistical leaders are individual statistical leaders of the Kansas Jayhawks football program in various categories, including passing, rushing, receiving, total offense, defensive stats, and kicking. Within those areas, the lists identify single-game, single-season, and career leaders. The Jayhawks represent the University of Kansas in the NCAA Division I FBS Big 12 Conference.

Although Kansas began competing in intercollegiate football in 1890, the school's official record book considers the "modern era" to have begun in 1937. Records from before this year are often incomplete and inconsistent, and they are generally not included in these lists.

These lists are dominated by more recent players for several reasons:

- Since 1937, seasons have increased from 10 games to 11 and then 12 games in length.
- The NCAA didn't allow freshmen to play varsity football until 1972 (with the exception of the World War II years).
- Bowl games only began counting toward single-season and career statistics in 2002. The Jayhawks have played in six bowl games since then, allowing players in those seasons an extra game to accumulate statistics.
- The Jayhawks eclipsed 5,000 total yards in a season six times since 2002 allowing players from this era to rack up yards and touchdowns and make their way up these lists. Additionally, rule changes have allowed for offenses to be more productive than in the past.
- Due to COVID-19 issues, the NCAA ruled that the 2020 season would not count against the athletic eligibility of any football player, giving everyone who played in that season the opportunity for five years of eligibility instead of the normal four.

These lists are updated through the end of the 2025 season.

== Passing ==
=== Passing yards ===
Career
Rank	Player	Yards	Years
1	Todd Reesing	11,194	2006 2007 2008 2009
2	Jalon Daniels	9,282	2020 2021 2022 2023 2024 2025
3	Frank Seurer	6,410	1980 1981 1982 1983
4	Kelly Donohoe	5,382	1986 1987 1988 1989
5	David Jaynes	5,132	1971 1972 1973
6	Carter Stanley	5,035	2016 2017 2018 2019
7	Mike Norseth	4,677	1984 1985
8	Jason Bean	4,662	2021 2022 2023
9	Chip Hilleary	4,598	1989 1990 1991 1992
10	Bill Whittemore	4,051	2002 2003

Single season
Rank	Player	Yards	Year
1	Todd Reesing	3,888	2008
2	Todd Reesing	3,616	2009
3	Todd Reesing	3,486	2007
4	Mike Norseth	2,995	1985
5	Frank Seurer	2,789	1983
6	Carter Stanley	2,664	2019
7	Jalon Daniels	2,531	2025
8	Jalon Daniels	2,454	2024
9	Bill Whittemore	2,385	2003
10	David Jaynes	2,253	1972

Single game
Rank	Player	Yards	Year	Opponent
1	Jalon Daniels	544	2022	Arkansas; Liberty Bowl
2	Todd Reesing	498	2009	Missouri
3	Mike Norseth	480	1985	Vanderbilt
4	Jason Bean	449	2023	UNLV (Guaranteed Rate Bowl)
5	Jalon Daniels	445	2025	Cincinnati
6	Todd Reesing	442	2009	Iowa State
7	Bill Whittemore	422	2003	Colorado
8	Carter Stanley	418	2017	Kansas State
9	Carter Stanley	415	2019	Texas Tech
10	Todd Reesing	412	2008	Louisiana Tech

=== Passing touchdowns ===
Career
Rank	Player	TDs	Years
1	Todd Reesing	90	2006 2007 2008 2009
2	Jalon Daniels	67	2020 2021 2022 2023 2024 2025
3	Jason Bean	38	2021 2022 2023
4	Carter Stanley	37	2016 2017 2018 2019
5	David Jaynes	35	1971 1972 1973
6	Frank Seurer	30	1980 1981 1982 1983
7	Bill Whittemore	29	2002 2003
8	Chip Hilleary	25	1989 1990 1991 1992
9	Mike Norseth	24	1984 1985
	Kelly Donohoe	24	1986 1987 1988 1989

Single season
Rank	Player	TDs	Year
1	Todd Reesing	33	2007
2	Todd Reesing	32	2008
3	Carter Stanley	24	2019
4	Todd Reesing	22	2009
	Jalon Daniels	22	2025
6	Bill Whittemore	18	2003
	Jalon Daniels	18	2022
	Jason Bean	18	2023
9	David Jaynes	15	1972
	Mike Norseth	15	1985

Single game
Rank	Player	TDs	Year	Opponent
1	Todd Reesing	6	2007	Nebraska
	Jason Bean	6	2023	UNLV (Guaranteed Rate Bowl)
3	Ralph Miller	5	1938	Washburn
	Jalon Daniels	5	2022	Arkansas; Liberty Bowl
	Jason Bean	5	2023	Oklahoma State

== Rushing ==
=== Rushing yards ===
Career
Rank	Player	Yards	Years
1	Devin Neal	4,343	2021 2022 2023 2024
2	June Henley	3,841	1993 1994 1995 1996
3	Tony Sands	3,788	1988 1989 1990 1991
4	James Sims	3,592	2010 2011 2012 2013
5	Laverne Smith	3,074	1973 1974 1975 1976
6	Clark Green	2,754	2002 2003 2004 2005
7	Gale Sayers	2,675	1962 1963 1964
8	John Riggins	2,659	1968 1969 1970
9	David Winbush	2,608	1997 1998 1999 2000
10	Pooka Williams Jr.	2,382	2018 2019 2020

Single season
Rank	Player	Yards	Year
1	Jon Cornish	1,457	2006
2	Tony Sands	1,442	1991
3	June Henley	1,349	1996
4	Devin Neal	1,280	2023
5	Devin Neal	1,266	2024
6	Laverne Smith	1,181	1974
7	John Riggins	1,131	1970
8	Wade Stinson	1,129	1950
9	June Henley	1,127	1993
10	Gale Sayers	1,125	1962
	Brandon McAnderson	1,125	2007
	Pooka Williams Jr.	1,125	2018

Single game
Rank	Player	Yards	Year	Opponent
1	Tony Sands	396	1991	Missouri
2	Nolan Cromwell	294	1975	Oregon State
3	Khalil Herbert	291	2017	West Virginia
4	Gale Sayers	283	1962	Oklahoma State
5	David Winbush	268	1998	Colorado
6	Pooka Williams Jr.	252	2018	Oklahoma
7	Wade Stinson	239	1950	Utah
8	June Henley	237	1993	Iowa State
9	Laverne Smith	236	1975	Missouri
10	Reggie Duncan	227	2001	Texas Tech

=== Rushing touchdowns ===
Career
Rank	Player	TDs	Years
1	Devin Neal	49	2021 2022 2023 2024
2	June Henley	41	1993 1994 1995 1996
3	James Sims	34	2010 2011 2012 2013
4	Tony Sands	28	1988 1989 1990 1991
5	Chip Hilleary	23	1989 1990 1991 1992
	Brandon McAnderson	23	2004 2005 2006 2007
	Jake Sharp	23	2006 2007 2008 2009
	Jalon Daniels	23	2020 2021 2022 2023 2024 2025
	Daniel Hishaw Jr.	23	2020 2022 2023 2024 2025
10	David Winbush	22	1997 1998 1999 2000

Single season
Rank	Player	TDs	Year
1	June Henley	17	1996
2	Brandon McAnderson	16	2007
	Devin Neal	16	2023
	Devin Neal	16	2024
5	Wade Stinson	14	1950
	Chip Hilleary	14	1991
7	Bud Laughlin	13	1951
	June Henley	13	1993
9	Bobby Douglass	12	1968
	John Riggins	12	1970
	Maurice Douglas	12	1992
	Jake Sharp	12	2008

Single game
Rank	Player	TDs	Year	Opponent
1	Charlie Black	4	1923	Washington (St. Louis)
	Curtis McClinton	4	1961	California
	June Henley	4	1996	TCU
	Brandon McAnderson	4	2007	Nebraska
	Jake Sharp	4	2008	Kansas State
	James Sims	4	2010	Colorado

== Receiving ==
=== Receptions ===
Career
Rank	Player	Rec	Years
1	Kerry Meier	226	2006 2007 2008 2009
2	Dezmon Briscoe	219	2007 2008 2009
3	Steven Sims Jr.	214	2015 2016 2017 2018
4	Luke Grimm	177	2020 2021 2022 2023 2024
5	Mark Simmons	155	2002 2003 2004 2005
6	Kwamie Lassiter II	148	2017 2018 2019 2020 2021
7	Lawrence Arnold	147	2020 2021 2022 2023 2024
8	Willie Vaughn	133	1985 1986 1987 1988
9	Brandon Rideau	131	2001 2002 2003 2004
10	Dexton Fields	129	2005 2006 2007 2008

Single season
Rank	Player	Rec	Year
1	Kerry Meier	102	2009
2	Kerry Meier	97	2008
3	Dezmon Briscoe	92	2009
4	Dezmon Briscoe	84	2008
5	Steven Sims Jr.	72	2016
6	Richard Estell	70	1985
7	Andrew Parchment	65	2019
8	Dexton Fields	63	2007
9	LaQuvionte Gonzalez	62	2016
10	Daymond Patterson	60	2010

Single game
Rank	Player	Rec	Year	Opponent
1	Kerry Meier	16	2009	Iowa State
2	Kerry Meier	14	2008	Missouri
	Dezmon Briscoe	14	2008	Minnesota
	Dezmon Briscoe	14	2009	Missouri
5	Boden Groen	13	2025	Texas Tech
6	Dezmon Briscoe	12	2008	Oklahoma
	Dezmon Briscoe	12	2009	Iowa State
8	Dexton Fields	11	2007	Iowa State
	Kerry Meier	11	2008	South Florida
	Kerry Meier	11	2009	Colorado
	Willie Vaughn	11	1986	Colorado
	Quintin Smith	11	1989	Louisville
	Isaac Byrd	11	1996	Iowa State

=== Receiving yards ===
Career
Rank	Player	Yards	Years
1	Dezmon Briscoe	3,240	2007 2008 2009
2	Steven Sims Jr.	2,582	2015 2016 2017 2018
3	Luke Grimm	2,472	2020 2021 2022 2023 2024
4	Kerry Meier	2,309	2006 2007 2008 2009
5	Willie Vaughn	2,266	1985 1986 1987 1988
6	Lawrence Arnold	2,219	2020 2021 2022 2023 2024
7	Mark Simmons	2,161	2002 2003 2004 2005
8	Richard Estell	1,997	1982 1983 1984 1985
9	Emmett Edwards	1,846	1972 1973 1974
10	Bob Johnson	1,789	1981 1982 1983

Single season
Rank	Player	Yards	Year
1	Dezmon Briscoe	1,407	2008
2	Dezmon Briscoe	1,337	2009
3	Bob Johnson	1,144	1983
4	Richard Estell	1,109	1985
5	Kerry Meier	1,045	2008
6	Marcus Henry	1,014	2007
7	Kerry Meier	985	2009
8	Quintin Smith	898	1989
9	Steven Sims Jr.	859	2016
10	Isaac Byrd	840	1996

Single game
Rank	Player	Yards	Year	Opponent
1	Dezmon Briscoe	269	2008	Oklahoma
2	Dezmon Briscoe	242	2009	Missouri
3	Steven Sims Jr.	233	2017	Kansas State
4	Quintin Smith	221	1989	Louisville
5	Emmanuel Henderson	214	2025	Cincinnati
6	Bob Johnson	208	1983	Kansas State
7	Bob Johnson	203	1983	Colorado
8	Dezmon Briscoe	201	2008	Minnesota
9	Marcus Henry	199	2007	Oklahoma State
10	Darren Green	197	1983	USC

=== Receiving touchdowns ===
Career
Rank	Player	TDs	Years
1	Dezmon Briscoe	31	2007 2008 2009
2	Luke Grimm	23	2020 2021 2022 2023 2024
3	Steven Sims Jr.	19	2015 2016 2017 2018
4	Kerry Meier	18	2006 2007 2008 2009
5	Bruce Adams	17	1972 1973 1974
	Willie Vaughn	17	1985 1986 1987 1988
7	Mark Simmons	16	2002 2003 2004 2005
8	Dexton Fields	15	2005 2006 2007 2008
9	Brandon Rideau	14	2001 2002 2003 2004
	Lawrence Arnold	14	2020 2021 2022 2023 2024

Single season
Rank	Player	TDs	Year
1	Dezmon Briscoe	15	2008
2	Marcus Henry	10	2007
3	Dezmon Briscoe	9	2009
4	Bruce Adams	8	1972
	Quintin Smith	8	1989
	Kerry Meier	8	2008
	Kerry Meier	8	2009
	Stephon Robinson Jr.	8	2019
8	Bruce Adams	7	1973
	Isaac Byrd	7	1996
	Mark Simmons	7	2003
	Brandon Rideau	7	2004
	Dezmon Briscoe	7	2007
	Steven Sims Jr.	7	2016
	Andrew Parchment	7	2019

Single game
Rank	Player	TDs	Year	Opponent
1	Quintin Smith	4	1989	Louisville
2	Marcus Henry	3	2007	Oklahoma State
	Dezmon Briscoe	3	2007	Nebraska
	Dezmon Briscoe	3	2008	Florida International
	Dezmon Briscoe	3	2008	Minnesota
	Lawrence Arnold	3	2023	UNLV (Guaranteed Rate Bowl)
	Luke Grimm	3	2023	UNLV (Guaranteed Rate Bowl)

== Total offense ==
Total offense is the sum of passing and rushing statistics. It does not include receiving or returns.

=== Total offense yards ===
Career
Rank	Player	Yards	Years
1	Todd Reesing	11,840	2006 2007 2008 2009
2	Jalon Daniels	10,733	2020 2021 2022 2023 2024 2025
3	Frank Seurer	6,112	1980 1981 1982 1983
4	Chip Hilleary	5,888	1989 1990 1991 1992
5	Jason Bean	5,566	2021 2022 2023
6	Carter Stanley	5,353	2016 2017 2018 2019
7	Kelly Donohoe	5,228	1986 1987 1988 1989
8	Bill Whittemore	5,134	2002 2003
9	Mike Norseth	4,996	1984 1985
10	David Jaynes	4,639	1971 1972 1973

Single season
Rank	Player	Yards	Year
1	Todd Reesing	4,112	2008
2	Todd Reesing	3,735	2009
3	Todd Reesing	3,683	2007
4	Mike Norseth	3,214	1985
5	Jalon Daniels	2,935	2025
6	Bill Whittemore	2,919	2003
7	Jalon Daniels	2,901	2024
8	Carter Stanley	2,729	2019
9	Frank Seurer	2,660	1983
10	Jalon Daniels	2,433	2022

Single game
Rank	Player	Yards	Year	Opponent
1	Jalon Daniels	565	2022	Arkansas; Liberty Bowl
2	Mike Norseth	509	1985	Vanderbilt
3	Todd Reesing	506	2009	Missouri
4	Jalon Daniels	500	2025	Cincinnati
5	Jason Bean	470	2023	UNLV (Guaranteed Rate Bowl)
6	Bill Whittemore	467	2003	Colorado
7	Todd Reesing	454	2009	Iowa State
8	Carter Stanley	441	2017	Kansas State
9	Kelly Donohoe	439	1989	Iowa State
10	Carter Stanley	416	2019	Texas Tech

=== Touchdowns responsible for ===
"Touchdowns responsible for" is the NCAA's official term for combined passing and rushing touchdowns.

Career
Rank	Player	TDs	Years
1	Todd Reesing	105	2006 2007 2008 2009
2	Jalon Daniels	90	2020 2021 2022 2023 2024 2025
3	Bill Whittemore	50	2002 2003
4	Devin Neal	49	2021 2022 2023 2024
5	Chip Hilleary	48	1989 1990 1991 1992
6	Jason Bean	47	2021 2022 2023
7	June Henley	41	1993 1994 1995 1996
8	David Jaynes	40	1971 1972 1973
9	Bobby Douglass	39	1966 1967 1968
10	Carter Stanley	38	2016 2017 2018 2019

Single season
Rank	Player	TDs	Year
1	Todd Reesing	36	2007
	Todd Reesing	36	2008
3	Bill Whittemore	28	2003
	Todd Reesing	28	2009
5	Jalon Daniels	26	2025
6	Carter Stanley	25	2019
	Jalon Daniels	25	2022
8	Bobby Douglass	24	1968
9	Bill Whittemore	22	2002
10	Jason Bean	21	2023

Single game
Rank	Player	TDs	Year	Opponent
1	Todd Reesing	6	2007	Nebraska
	Jalon Daniels	6	2022	Arkansas; Liberty Bowl
	Jason Bean	6	2023	UNLV (Guaranteed Rate Bowl)
3	Ralph Miller	5	1938	Washburn
	Mike Norseth	5	1985	Eastern Illinois
	Chip Hilleary	5	1992	Iowa State
	Dylen Smith	5	2000	Texas Tech
	Bill Whittemore	5	2003	Colorado
	Jalon Daniels	5	2022	Houston
	Jalon Daniels	5	2022	Duke
	Jason Bean	5	2023	Oklahoma State

== Defense ==
=== Interceptions ===
Career
Rank	Player	Ints	Years
1	Ray Evans	17	1941 1942 1946 1947
2	Aqib Talib	13	2005 2006 2007
	Cobee Bryant	13	2020 2021 2022 2023 2024
4	Hal Cleavinger	12	1950 1951 1952
	Mello Dotson	12	2020 2021 2022 2023 2024
6	Milt Garner	11	1984 1985 1986 1987
7	Gary Adams	10	1970 1971 1972
	LeRoy Irvin	10	1976 1977 1978 1979
	Wayne Zeigler	10	1983 1984 1985 1986
10	John Konek	9	1951 1952
	Charles Gordon	9	2003 2004 2005

Single season
Rank	Player	Ints	Year
1	Ray Evans	10	1942
2	John Konek	8	1951
3	Charles Gordon	7	2004
4	Hal Cleavinger	6	1952
	Skip Sharp	6	1976
	Jeff Colter	6	1983
	Remuise Johnson	6	2002
	Aqib Talib	6	2006

Single game
Rank	Player	Ints	Year	Opponent
1	John Konek	3	1951	Oklahoma State
	Duane Morris	3	1957	Oklahoma State
	Bill Crank	3	1958	Tulane
	Cobee Bryant	3	2024	Houston

=== Tackles ===
Career
Rank	Player	Tackles	Years
1	Willie Pless	633	1982 1983 1984 1985
2	Nick Reid	416	2002 2003 2004 2005
3	Rick Bredesen	403	1984 1985 1986 1987
4	Joe Dineen Jr.	386	2015 2016 2017 2018
5	Kenny Logan Jr.	383	2019 2020 2021 2022 2023
6	Kyle McNorton	381	1978 1979 1980 1981
7	Curtis Moore	350	1986 1987 1990
8	LeRoy Irvin	347	1976 1977 1978 1979
9	Mike Sweatman	341	1965 1966 1967
10	Ben Heeney	335	2011 2012 2013 2014

Single season
Rank	Player	Tackles	Year
1	Willie Pless	206	1984
2	Willie Pless	191	1985
3	Willie Pless	188	1983
4	Curtis Moore	170	1988
5	Steve Towle	155	1974
6	Darnell Williams	147	1983
	Joe Dineen Jr.	147	2018
8	Roger Robben	146	1989
9	Joe Dineen Jr.	137	2017
10	Nick Reid	133	2003

Single game
Rank	Player	Tackles	Year	Opponent
1	Steve Towle	25	1974	Colorado
	Willie Pless	25	1984	Oklahoma State
	Curtis Moore	25	1988	Iowa State
4	Willie Pless	22	1983	Missouri
	Willie Pless	22	1984	Kansas State
	Curtis Moore	22	1988	Colorado
	Curtis Moore	22	1988	Missouri
	Marcus Rogers	22	2001	Texas Tech
9	Emery Hicks	21	1968	Oklahoma
	Scellars Young	21	1978	Colorado
	LeRoy Irvin	21	1979	Missouri
	Ben Heeney	21	2014	Texas Tech

=== Sacks ===
Career
Rank	Player	Sacks	Years
1	Algie Atkinson	24.0	1998 1999 2000 2001
2	Jake Laptad	21.0	2007 2008 2009 2010
3	Ron Warner	20.5	1996 1997
4	Phil Forte	20.0	1983 1984 1985 1986
	Brandon Perkins	20.0	2002 2003 2004 2005
6	Daniel Wise	18.5	2015 2016 2017 2018
7	Dana Stubblefield	17.0	1990 1991 1992
	Nate Dwyer	17.0	1998 1999 2000 2001
9	Kyle Moore	15.5	1990 1991 1992
	Dorance Armstrong Jr.	15.5	2015 2016 2017

Single season
Rank	Player	Sacks	Year
1	Ron Warner	14.5	1997
2	Algie Atkinson	11.0	2001
3	Dana Stubblefield	10.0	1991
	James Holt	10.0	2008
	Dorance Armstrong Jr.	10.0	2016
6	Kyle Moore	9.5	1992
7	Charlton Keith	8.5	2005
	Brandon Perkins	8.5	2005
9	Phil Forte	8.0	1984
	Austin Booker	8.0	2023

Single game
Rank	Player	Sacks	Year	Opponent
1	Brandon Perkins	5.0	2005	Louisiana Tech
2	Ron Warner	4.0	1997	Texas Tech

== Kicking ==
The 2023 Kansas Football Media Guide does not list a full top 10 in field goal kicking stats.

=== Field goals made ===
Career
Rank	Player	FGs	Years
1	Dan Eichloff	62	1990 1991 1992 1993
2	Bruce Kallmeyer	53	1980 1981 1982 1983
3	Scott Webb	47	2004 2005 2006 2007
4	Joe Garcia	40	1997 1998 1999 2000
	Johnny Beck	40	2001 2002 2003 2004
6	Jacob Branstetter	30	2008 2009 2010
7	Matthew Wyman	29	2013 2014 2015 2016
	Gabriel Rui	29	2017 2018

Single season
Rank	Player	FGs	Year
1	Bruce Kallmeyer	24	1983
2	Jeff Johnson	18	1985
	Dan Eichloff	18	1991
	Scott Webb	18	2007
5	Gabriel Rui	17	2017
6	Dan Eichloff	16	1992
7	Dodge Schwartzburg	15	1984
	Dan Eichloff	15	1990
9	Johnny Beck	14	2001
	Scott Webb	14	2005
	Laith Marjan	14	2025

Single game
Rank	Player	FGs	Year	Opponent
1	Bruce Kallmeyer	5	1981	Nebraska
	Bruce Kallmeyer	5	1983	Wichita State

=== Field goal percentage ===
Career (minimum 30 attempts)
Rank	Player	FG%	Years
1	Gabriel Rui	78.3%	2017 2018
2	Bruce Kallmeyer	76.8%	1980 1981 1982 1983
3	Dan Eichloff	71.3%	1990 1991 1992 1993
4	Scott Webb	69.1%	2004 2005 2006 2007
5	Jacob Branstetter	66.7%	2008 2009 2010

Single season (minimum 10 attempts)
Rank	Player	FG%	Year
1	Bruce Kallmeyer	85.7%	1981
2	Gabriel Rui	85.0%	2017
3	Dodge Schwartzburg	83.3%	1984
4	Bruce Kallmeyer	82.8%	1983
5	Laith Marjan	82.4%	2025
6	Dan Eichloff	80.0%	1992
	Tabor Allen	80.0%	2024
