= 1986 Kansas State Wildcats football team =

American college football season

1986 Kansas State Wildcats football
- Conference: Big Eight Conference
- Record: 2–9 (1–6 Big 8)
- Head coach: Stan Parrish (1st season)
- Offensive coordinator: Ken Bowman (1st season)
- Defensive coordinator: Jerry Hartman (1st season)
- Home stadium: KSU Stadium

1986 Big Eight Conference football standings
	Conf.					Overall
Team	W		L		T	W		L		T
No. 3 Oklahoma $	7	–	0	–	0	11	–	1	–	0
Colorado	6	–	1	–	0	6	–	6	–	0
No. 5 Nebraska	5	–	2	–	0	10	–	2	–	0
Oklahoma State	4	–	3	–	0	6	–	5	–	0
Iowa State	3	–	4	–	0	6	–	5	–	0
Missouri	2	–	5	–	0	3	–	8	–	0
Kansas State	1	–	6	–	0	2	–	9	–	0
Kansas	0	–	7	–	0	3	–	8	–	0
$ – Conference champion; Rankings from AP Poll

The 1986 Kansas State Wildcats football team represented Kansas State University in the 1986 NCAA Division I-A football season. The team's head football coach was Stan Parrish. The Wildcats played their home games in KSU Stadium. They finished with a record of 2–9 overall and 1–6 in Big Eight Conference play.

The Wildcats' October 18 win against rival Kansas would be the program's last victory for 31 games, stretching until the 1989 season, when they defeated North Texas 20–17 on a last-second touchdown pass. Kansas State posted a 0–30–1 record during the streak, with the lone tie also coming against Kansas in 1987.

== Schedule ==
Date	Opponent	Site	Result	Attendance	Source
August 30	Western Illinois*	KSU Stadium; Manhattan, KS	W 35–7	26,320	
September 6	at Texas Tech*	Jones Stadium; Lubbock, TX	L 7–41	37,842	
September 13	Northern Iowa*	KSU Stadium; Manhattan, KS	L 0–17	28,820	
September 20	at TCU*	Amon G. Carter Stadium; Fort Worth, TX	L 22–35	26,139	
October 4	at No. 6 Oklahoma	Oklahoma Memorial Stadium; Norman, OK	L 10–56	74,284	
October 18	Kansas	KSU Stadium; Manhattan, KS (rivalry)	W 29–12	38,320	
October 25	Missouri^{†}	KSU Stadium; Manhattan, KS	L 6–17	19,850	
November 1	at No. 9 Nebraska	Memorial Stadium; Lincoln, NE (rivalry)	L 0–38	75,893	
November 8	Oklahoma State	KSU Stadium; Manhattan, KS	L 3–23	21,270	
November 15	at Iowa State	Cyclone Stadium; Ames, IA (rivalry)	L 19–48	32,305	
November 22	Colorado	KSU Stadium; Manhattan, KS (rivalry)	L 3–49	14,700	
*Non-conference game; ^{†}Homecoming; Rankings from AP Poll released prior to the game

== Game summaries ==
=== Oklahoma ===
Kansas State Wildcats (1–3) at Oklahoma Sooners (2–1)

Quarter	1	2	3	4	Total
Kansas State	0	10	0	0	10
Oklahoma	21	7	7	21	56

at Oklahoma Memorial Stadium • Norman, Oklahoma

- Date: October 4
- Game attendance: 74,284

Game information

Kansas State

- Randy Williams
  13/21, 97 Yds, INT
- Todd Moody
  19 Rush, 57 Yds
- Todd Elder
  6 Rec, 60 Yds

Oklahoma

- Eric Mitchel
  1/6, 58 Yds, TD
  12 Rush, 126 Yds, 2 TD
- Carl Cabbiness
  1 Rec, 58 Yds, TD

Scoring summary

Quarter	Time	Drive			Team	Scoring information	Score	
Quarter	Time	Plays	Yards	TOP	Team	Scoring information	KSU	OKLA
1					Oklahoma	Lydell Carr 1-yard touchdown run, Tim Lashar kick good	0	7
1					Oklahoma	Eric Mitchel 56-yard touchdown run, Tim Lashar kick good	0	14
1					Oklahoma	Spencer Tillman 5-yard touchdown run, Tim Lashar kick good	0	21
2					Oklahoma	Eric Mitchel 3-yard touchdown run, Tim Lashar kick good	0	28
2					Kansas State	Blocked punt returned 19 yards for touchdown by Grady Newton, Mark Porter kick good	7	28
2					Kansas State	32-yard field goal by Mark Porter	10	28
3					Oklahoma	Carl Cabbiness 58-yard touchdown reception from Eric Mitchel, Tim Lashar kick good	10	35
4					Oklahoma	Glenn Sullivan 1-yard touchdown run, Tim Lashar kick good	10	42
4					Oklahoma	Glenn Sullivan 12-yard touchdown run, Tim Lashar kick good	10	49
4					Oklahoma	Rotnei Anderson 6-yard touchdown run, Tim Lashar kick good	10	56
"TOP" = time of possession. For other American football terms, see Glossary of American football.							10	56

== Roster ==
1986 Kansas State Wildcats football team roster
Players
Coaches
Offense

Pos.	#	Name	Class
G		Bob Bessert (C)
RB		Clark Brown
WR		Todd Elder
QB		Tim Hanson
WR	83	Dan Hughes	Jr
RB	29	Tony Jordan	Jr
RB		Todd Moody (C)
WR	88	John Williams	Fr
QB		Randy Williams
FB		Ray Wilson

Defense

Pos.	#	Name	Class
DT		Kevin Humphrey (C)
DT		Jeffrey Hurd (C)
LB		Grady Newton

Special teams

Pos.	#	Name	Class
K		Mark Porter

Head coach

- Stan Parrish

Coordinators/assistant coaches

- Ken Bowman – Offensive Coordinator
- Jerry Hartman – Defensive Coordinator
- Rich Rachel – Linebackers
- Dave Flegal – Assistant
- Mike Deal – Assistant
- Mark Deal – Assistant
- Bill Singler – Assistant
- L. C. Cole – Assistant
- Leo Bouchard – Assistant

Legend

- (C) Team captain
- (S) Suspended
- (I) Ineligible
- Injured
- Redshirt
