= 1986 Colorado Buffaloes football team =

American college football season

1986 Colorado Buffaloes football

Bluebonnet Bowl, L 9–21 vs. Baylor
- Conference: Big Eight Conference
- Record: 6–6 (6–1 Big 8)
- Head coach: Bill McCartney (5th season)
- Offensive coordinator: Gerry DiNardo (3rd season)
- Offensive scheme: Wishbone
- Defensive coordinator: Lou Tepper (4th season)
- Base defense: 3–4
- Captains: Steve Beck; Eric Coyle; Barry Remington
- Home stadium: Folsom Field

1986 Big Eight Conference football standings
	Conf.					Overall
Team	W		L		T	W		L		T
No. 3 Oklahoma $	7	–	0	–	0	11	–	1	–	0
Colorado	6	–	1	–	0	6	–	6	–	0
No. 5 Nebraska	5	–	2	–	0	10	–	2	–	0
Oklahoma State	4	–	3	–	0	6	–	5	–	0
Iowa State	3	–	4	–	0	6	–	5	–	0
Missouri	2	–	5	–	0	3	–	8	–	0
Kansas State	1	–	6	–	0	2	–	9	–	0
Kansas	0	–	7	–	0	3	–	8	–	0
$ – Conference champion; Rankings from AP Poll

The 1986 Colorado Buffaloes football team represented the University of Colorado at Boulder in the Big Eight Conference during the 1986 NCAA Division I-A football season. Led by fifth-year head coach Bill McCartney, Colorado opened with four losses, but finished the regular season at 6–5 (6–1 in Big 8, second). It was their best conference record in a quarter century, and they were invited to the Bluebonnet Bowl in Houston on New Year's Eve.

The Buffaloes were upset 23–7 in the opener by intrastate rival Colorado State, but defeated Nebraska for the first time in nineteen years, and the first time in Boulder since 1960.

== Schedule ==
Date	Opponent	Site	TV	Result	Attendance	Source
September 6	Colorado State*	Folsom Field; Boulder, CO	KCNC	L 7–23	45,109	
September 13	at Oregon*	Autzen Stadium; Eugene, OR		L 30–32	26,155	
September 20	at Ohio State*	Ohio Stadium; Columbus, OH		L 10–13	88,404	
September 27	No. 10 Arizona*	Folsom Field; Boulder, CO	Raycom	L 21–24	41,024	
October 11	at Missouri	Faurot Field; Columbia, MO	Raycom	W 17–12	42,780	
October 18	Iowa State^{†}	Folsom Field; Boulder, CO		W 31–3	41,215	
October 25	No. 3 Nebraska	Folsom Field; Boulder, CO		W 20–10	52,440	
November 1	at Oklahoma State	Lewis Field; Stillwater, OK	Raycom	W 31–14	36,900	
November 8	Kansas	Folsom Field; Boulder, CO		W 17–10	37,056	
November 15	No. 4 Oklahoma	Folsom Field; Boulder, CO	Raycom	L 0–28	52,707	
November 22	at Kansas State	KSU Stadium; Manhattan, KS (rivalry)		W 49–3	14,700	
December 31	vs. No. 14 Baylor*	Rice Stadium; Houston, TX (Bluebonnet Bowl)	Raycom	L 9–21	40,470	
*Non-conference game; ^{†}Homecoming; Rankings from AP Poll released prior to the game

== Game summaries ==
=== Nebraska ===
Team	1	2	3	4	Total
#3 Nebraska	0	0	7	3	10
• Colorado	7	3	0	10	20

- Date: October 25
- Location: Folsom Field, Boulder, Colorado

Scoring summary
1	COL	Jeff Campbell 39-yard run (Dave DeLine kick)	Colorado 7–0
2	COL	Dave DeLine 57-yard field goal	Colorado 10–0
3	NEB	Steve Taylor 2-yard run (Klein kick)	Colorado 10–7
4	COL	Lance Carl 52-yard pass from O.C. Oliver (DeLine kick)	Colorado 17–7
4	NEB	Dale Klein 29-yard field goal	Colorado 17–10
4	COL	Dave DeLine 36-yard field goal	Colorado 20–10

The fans tore down the goal posts as the Buffaloes defeated Nebraska for the first time since 1967, breaking a streak of 18 losses to the Huskers, and the first win in Boulder over NU since 1960. "This is a moment in our program we'll always cherish", said Colorado head coach Bill McCartney. "Up to this point I don't think we've beaten a great team. We did today. And I think we have a rivalry now."

=== Oklahoma State ===
Team	1	2	3	4	Total
• Colorado	3	0	14	14	31
Oklahoma St	0	14	0	0	14

- Date: November 1
- Location: Lewis Field • Stillwater, Oklahoma

Scoring summary
1	COL	DeLine 47-yard field goal	Colorado 3–0
2	OKST	Dykes 17-yard pass from Gundy (O'Connell kick)	Oklahoma St 7–3
2	OKST	Thomas 3-yard run (O'Connell kick)	Oklahoma St 14–3
3	COL	Oliver 23-yard pass from Hatcher (DeLine kick)	Oklahoma St 14–10
3	COL	Hatcher 1-yard run (DeLine kick)	Colorado 17–14
4	COL	Weatherspoon recovered fumble in end zone (DeLine kick)	Colorado 24–14
4	COL	Smith 2-yard run (DeLine kick)	Colorado 31–14

== Personnel ==
=== Coaching staff ===
Head coach: Bill McCartney

Assistant coaches: Lou Tepper (AHC/DC/ILB), Gerry DiNardo (OC/TE), Gary Barnett (QB/FB), Steve Bernstein (DB), Mike Hankwitz (OLB), Steve Logan (RB), Oliver Lucas (WR), Les Miles (OL), Ron Vanderlinden (DL)
