= Todd Reesing =

American football player (born 1987)

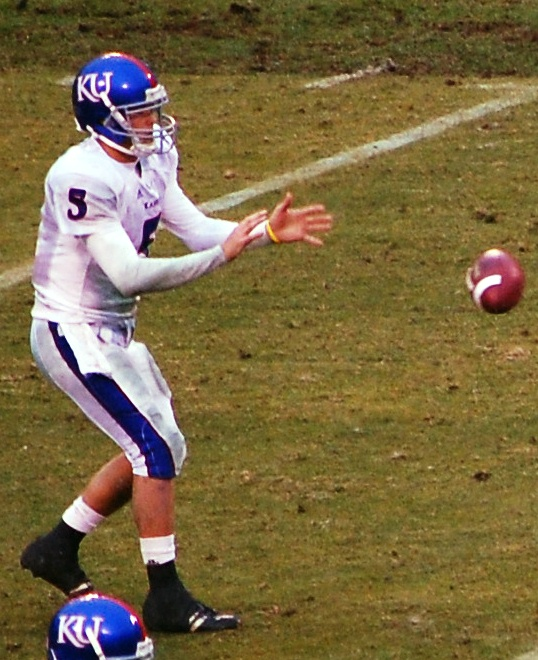
- Reesing in 2008 with Kansas

No. 5
- Position: Quarterback

Personal information
- Born: September 20, 1987 (age 39); Austin, Texas, U.S.
- Listed height: 5 ft 11 in (1.80 m)
- Listed weight: 200 lb (91 kg)

Career information
- High school: Lake Travis (Austin, Texas)
- College: Kansas (2006–2009)
- NFL draft: 2010: undrafted

Career history
- Saskatchewan Roughriders (2010)*
- * Offseason or practice squad member only

Awards and highlights
- Second-team All-Big 12 (2007)
- Stats at ESPN

Todd Reesing (born September 20, 1987) is an American former college football quarterback who played at the University of Kansas. After graduating from Kansas, he briefly spent time with the Saskatchewan Roughriders of the Canadian Football League during their 2010 off-season. After his career was over, he began doing color commentary for the Jayhawk Television Network. Reesing led the Jayhawks to their best start in school history, winning their first 11 games of the 2007 season. The Jayhawks finished the season 12–1 and won the 2008 Orange Bowl, the schools first and only BCS Bowl victory. Reesing owns Kansas career passing records in several categories.

== Early life ==
Reesing attended Lake Travis High School in Austin, Texas and was a good student and a letterman in football and baseball. In football, Reesing was named the Texas 4A Player of the Year as a junior. As a senior, Reesing passed for 3,343 yards, 41 touchdown passes, and threw only 5 interceptions. He added 756 yards and 8 touchdowns running the ball. In baseball, he was a second-team All-District honoree as an outfielder. Reesing graduated from Lake Travis High School in 2006 and was in the top one percent of his graduating class. Despite his success, Reesing was not heavily recruited by in-state programs Texas and Texas A&M due to his short stature. Kansas coach Mark Mangino invited Reesing to visit the school while Reesing was in Kansas for a visit to Kansas State. Shortly after, Reesing committed to the University of Kansas Football team.

== College career ==
In 2006, injuries and inadequate play at the quarterback position forced coach Mark Mangino to remove Reesing's redshirt through a conference game against Colorado. Reesing led the Jayhawks with three touchdowns (2 passing and 1 rushing) to a 20–15 come from behind win. Shortly thereafter, Kerry Meier returned from an injury, and Reesing served as the backup quarterback through the end of the season.

Despite not starting a game the previous season, Reesing competed for the starting position for the 2007 season. He then beat out Kerry Meier for the starting job. On November 3, Reesing passed for 354 yards and 6 touchdowns while the Jayhawk offense scored 76 points against Nebraska, the most points ever scored in one game against Nebraska. Reesing led the Jayhawks to a school-best 11–0 record before falling 36–28 to the 10–1 Missouri Tigers in the Border Showdown. Despite this loss, Kansas was selected to play in the 2008 FedEx Orange Bowl against 11–2 Virginia Tech. In the Orange Bowl, Reesing was 20 for 37 for 227 yards with one touchdown and one interception. He led Kansas to victory over Virginia Tech 24–21 and the Jayhawks capped off their best season in school history at 12–1. He finished the season ranked 14th in the NCAA and fourth in the Big 12 Conference in passing efficiency (148.82). Reesing also threw for a school-record 3,486 yards and 33 touchdowns, while completing 61.9 percent of his attempts. He was named a semifinalist for the Davey O'Brien Award, which is awarded to the best collegiate quarterback each year. By the end of the season, he had already broken the career passing touchdown record for Kansas.

Reesing opened the 2008 season with a 37-of-52 performance against the FIU Golden Panthers, setting career highs for passes completed and attempted. During week three against South Florida, Reesing threw for 373 yards and three touchdowns, but his interception in the final minute put South Florida in a position to win with a field goal. In a win against Kansas State, Reesing completed 14 of 23 passes for 162 yards and a touchdown. Additionally, he rushed for a season-high 47 yards and a touchdown. Against rival Missouri, Reesing completed 37 passes for 357 yards and four touchdowns including a late touchdown pass to Kerry Meier late in the fourth quarter. Following this win, the Jayhawks earned an invitation to the 2008 Insight Bowl to play the Minnesota Golden Gophers. In this game, Reesing completed 27 of 35 passes for 313 yards and 4 touchdowns. Reesing finished the season with 329 completions for a school-record 3,888 yards and 36 touchdowns.

The Jayhawks entered the 2009 season ranked 25th. After the first five games, Reesing helped lead the Jayhawks to their second 5–0 start in three seasons. Through the first five games, Reesing threw for 1,579 yards 13 touchdowns and only 3 interceptions. After the 5–0 start the Jayhawks were ranked 17th. Their first loss came on the road against Colorado. The Jayhawks went on to lose seven consecutive games finishing the season 5–7, making the Jayhawks ineligible for a bowl game for the first time since 2004. Reesing finished the season with 3,616 yards 22 touchdowns and 10 interceptions.

=== Career statistics ===
Passing								Rushing
Year	Comp	Att	Yards	Pct.	TDs	Int	Rating	Att	Yds	Avg	TD
2006	14	24	204	58.3	3	3	145.98	13	106	8.2	2
2007	275	445	3,486	61.8	33	7	148.93	92	197	2.1	3
2008	329	495	3,888	66.5	32	13	148.53	126	224	1.8	4
2009	313	496	3,616	63.1	22	10	134.95	104	119	1.1	6
Totals	931	1,460	11,194	62.4	90	33	144.60	335	646	1.9	15

=== Legacy ===
Reesing broke several Kansas football records, some of which he broke by a large margin. He owns the records for passing yards, passing touchdowns (which he broke in just 16 career games), quarterback rating (minimum 200 attempts), completions, attempts, and completion percentage (minimum 200 attempts). He is also top 10 all-time in the Big 12 in passing yards and passing touchdowns.

== Professional career ==
On May 26, 2010, Reesing signed with the Saskatchewan Roughriders of the Canadian Football League. On June 8, 2010, Reesing was released during training camp.

== Personal ==
Reesing graduated in December 2009 with degrees in finance and economics. He was honored by the University of Kansas as its male senior scholar athlete of the year. He also earned an NFF National Scholar-Athlete award, academic all-district honors and academic All-Big 12 Conference honors for the third straight year. On May 4, 2010, Reesing was named to the 2010 National Football Foundation Hampshire Honor Society.
