= Chuck Banker =

American football coach (born c. 1939)

Biographical details
- Born: c. 1939 or 1940 (age 85–86); Monrovia, California, U.S.
- Education: Westminster College

Playing career
- 1957–1958: Glendale (CA)
- 1959–1961: Cal State Los Angeles
- Positions: Tight end, linebacker

Coaching career (HC unless noted)
- 1962–1965: Glendale (CA) (DL)
- 1966–1967: Utah (LB/DE)
- 1968–1969: Westminster (UT) (DC)
- 1970: Westminster (UT)
- 1971–1973: Utah (OL)
- 1974–1975: Viewmont HS (UT)
- 1976–1978: Boise State (LB)
- 1979: Boise State (DC/LB)
- 1980–1982: St. Louis Cardinals (ST)
- 1983–1984: St. Louis Cardinals (ST/def. assistant)
- 1985: St. Louis Cardinals (OB)
- 1986: Iowa State (AHC/DE)
- 1986: Iowa State (interim HC)
- 1987–1988: Washington Redskins (ST)

Administrative career (AD unless noted)
- 1974–1975: Viewmont HS (UT)
- 1989–1993: Washington Redskins (scout)
- 1994–1995: Philadelphia Eagles (DPP)
- 1996: Philadelphia Eagles (dir. of scouting)
- 1997–1999: Washington Redskins (DPP)
- 2000–2003: Houston Texans (dir. of pro scouting)

Head coaching record
- Overall: 5–7 (college)

Charles J. Banker (born c. 1939 or 1940) is an American former football coach. He was the head football coach for Westminster College—now known as Westminster University—in 1970, Viewmont High School from 1974 to 1975, and Iowa State University in an interim capacity in 1986. He also coached for Glendale (CA), Utah, Boise State, and the St. Louis Cardinals and Washington Redskins of the National Football League (NFL). He played college football for Glendale (CA) and Cal State Los Angeles as a tight end and linebacker.

Banker served in various administrative roles for the Redskins; Philadelphia Eagles; and the new expansion team, the Houston Texans.

== Head coaching record ==
=== College ===
Year	Team	Overall	Conference	Standing
Westminster Parsons (Rocky Mountain Athletic Conference) (1970)
1970	Westminster	4–6	3–3	4th
Westminster:		4–6	3–3	
Iowa State Cyclones (Big Eight Conference) (1986)
1986	Iowa State	1–1 (Note: Banker replaced Jim Criner with two weeks remaining in the season.)	1–1	5th
Iowa State:		1–1	1–1	
Total:		5–7		
