= 1989 Missouri Tigers football team =

American college football season

1989 Missouri Tigers football
- Conference: Big Eight Conference
- Record: 2–9 (1–6 Big 8)
- Head coach: Bob Stull (1st season)
- Offensive coordinator: Dirk Koetter (1st season)
- Defensive coordinator: Michael Church (1st season)
- Home stadium: Faurot Field

1989 Big Eight Conference football standings
	Conf.					Overall
Team	W		L		T	W		L		T
No. 4 Colorado $	7	–	0	–	0	11	–	1	–	0
No. 11 Nebraska	6	–	1	–	0	10	–	2	–	0
Oklahoma	5	–	2	–	0	7	–	4	–	0
Iowa State	4	–	3	–	0	6	–	5	–	0
Oklahoma State	3	–	4	–	0	4	–	7	–	0
Kansas	2	–	5	–	0	4	–	7	–	0
Missouri	1	–	6	–	0	2	–	9	–	0
Kansas State	0	–	7	–	0	1	–	10	–	0
$ – Conference champion; Rankings from AP Poll

The 1989 Missouri Tigers football team was an American football team that represented the University of Missouri in the Big Eight Conference (Big 8) during the 1989 NCAA Division I-A football season. The team compiled a 2–9 record (1–6 against Big 8 opponents), finished in sixth place in the Big 8, and was outscored by opponents by a combined total of 363 to 171. Bob Stull was the head coach for the first of five seasons. The team played its home games at Faurot Field in Columbia, Missouri.

The team's statistical leaders included Tommie Stowers with 547 rushing yards, Kent Kiefer with 2,314 passing yards, and Linzy Collins with 803 receiving yards.

== Schedule ==
Date	Opponent	Site	Result	Attendance	Source
September 9	TCU*	Faurot Field; Columbia, MO	W 14–10	39,449	
September 16	at Indiana*	Memorial Stadium; Bloomington, IN	L 7–24	48,106	
September 23	No. 2 Miami (FL)*	Faurot Field; Columbia, MO	L 7–38	43,293	
September 30	at Arizona State*	Sun Devil Stadium; Tempe, AZ	L 3–19	64,003	
October 7	at No. 3 Colorado	Folsom Field; Boulder, CO	L 3–49	51,855	
October 14	No. 4 Nebraska	Faurot Field; Columbia, MO (rivalry)	L 7–50	55,620	
October 21	at Kansas State	KSU Stadium; Manhattan, KS	W 21–9	29,492	
October 28	Oklahoma State	Faurot Field; Columbia, MO	L 30–31	42,463	
November 4	at Oklahoma	Oklahoma Memorial Stadium; Norman, OK (rivalry)	L 14–52	72,300	
November 11	Iowa State	Faurot Field; Columbia, MO (rivalry)	L 21–35	36,538	
November 18	Kansas	Faurot Field; Columbia, MO (Border War)	L 44–46	33,981	
*Non-conference game; Rankings from AP Poll released prior to the game

== Coaching staff ==
Name	Position	Seasons at Missouri	Alma mater
Bob Stull	Head coach	1	Kansas State (1968)
Dirk Koetter	Offensive coordinator	1	Idaho State (1981)
Mke Ward	Running backs	1	
Larry Hoefer	Wide receivers	1	
Andy Reid	Offensive line	1	BYU (1981)
Kevin Faulkner	Tight ends	1	
Michael Church	Defensive coordinator & linebackers	1	Cal Poly San Luis Obispo (1972)
Mo Lattimore	Defensive line	1	
Steve Telander	co-linebackers	1	
Ken Flajole	defensive backs	1	Pacific Lutheran (1977)
