= 2008 Insight Bowl =

- 20th Insight Bowl
Kansas Jayhawks	Minnesota Golden Gophers
(7–5)	(7–5)
Big 12	Big Ten
42	21
Head coach: Mark Mangino	Head coach: Tim Brewster
	1	2	3	4	Total
Kansas	14	14	7	7	42
Minnesota	14	0	0	7	21
- Date: December 31, 2008
- Season: 2008
- Stadium: Sun Devil Stadium
- Location: Tempe, Arizona
- MVP: WR Dezmon Briscoe, Kansas (Offensive); LB James Holt, Kansas (Defensive)
- Favorite: Kansas by 10
- Referee: Matt Austin (SEC)
- Attendance: 49,103
- Payout: US$1.2 million per team

United States TV coverage
- Network: NFL Network (Simulcast on Fox affiliate WDAF-TV (channel 4) in Kansas City) (Comcast Channel 180, 24-hour free preview in the Twin Cities)
- Announcers: Paul Burmeister, Mike Mayock, Lindsay Soto
- Nielsen ratings: 0.4

The 2008 Insight Bowl was a college football bowl game played at Sun Devil Stadium in Tempe, Arizona, on December 31, 2008. The 20th edition of the Insight Bowl, it was telecast on NFL Network. The bowl featured the Kansas Jayhawks of the Big 12 Conference against the Minnesota Golden Gophers from the Big Ten Conference, with the Jayhawks winning, 42–21. The victory gave the Jayhawks their third consecutive win in a bowl game and sixth bowl game victory overall.

== Scoring summary ==
Scoring Play	Score
1st Quarter
KU - Dezmon Briscoe 60-yard TD pass from Todd Reesing (Jacob Branstetter kick), 14:49	KU 7-0
Minnesota - Jon Hoese 1-yard TD run (Joel Monroe kick), 13:18	Tie 7-7
Minnesota - Hoese 2-yard TD run (Monroe kick), 4:48	Minnesota 14-7
KU - Kerry Meier 4-yard TD pass from Reesing (Branstetter kick), :12	Tie 14-14
2nd Quarter
KU - Briscoe 6-yard TD pass from Reesing (Branstetter kick), 8:49	KU 21-14
KU - Johnathon Wilson 4-yard TD pass from Reesing (Branstetter kick), 1:07	KU 28-14
3rd Quarter
KU - Briscoe 32-yard TD pass from Reesing (Branstetter kick), 8:03	KU 35-14
4th Quarter
Minnesota - Eric Decker 6-yard TD pass from Adam Weber (Monroe kick), 13:01	KU 35-21
KU - Jake Sharp 2-yard TD run (Branstetter kick), 1:33	KU 42-21
