= Bob Valesente =

American football player and coach (born 1940)

Biographical details
- Born: July 19, 1940 (age 86); Seneca Falls, New York, U.S.

Playing career
- 1960s: Ithaca
- Positions: Halfback, defensive back

Coaching career (HC unless noted)
- 1964–1974: Cornell (assistant)
- 1975–1976: Cincinnati (assistant)
- 1977–1979: Arizona (assistant)
- 1980–1981: Mississippi State (DC)
- 1982–1983: Baltimore Colts (assistant)
- 1984–1985: Kansas (assistant)
- 1986–1987: Kansas
- 1988: Maryland (OC/QB)
- 1989: Pittsburgh (DC/AHC)
- 1990–1991: Pittsburgh Steelers (LB)
- 1992–1994: Green Bay Packers (LB)
- 1995–1998: Green Bay Packers (DB)
- 1999: Carolina Panthers (DB)
- 2001–2003: Frankfurt Galaxy (DC/LB)
- 2014–2017: Equipe de France de Football Américain (DC)

Head coaching record
- Overall: 4–17–1

Bob Valesente (born July 19, 1940) is an American former football player and coach. He played college football at Ithaca College and spent more than 35 years as a football coach. He was the head coach of the Kansas Jayhawks football team from 1986 to 1987 and has also served as an assistant football coach in the National Football League (NFL) with multiple teams.

== Early years ==
A native of Seneca Falls, New York, Valesente attended Ithaca College in the early 1960s, where he played football as a halfback and defensive back. He was also an All-American baseball player at Ithaca.

== Career ==
After leaving Ithaca, he played baseball in the Chicago Cubs minor league organization. He played for the Pocatello Chiefs in the Pioneer League in 1963 and the St. Cloud Rox in 1964.

=== Cornell ===
Valesente began his coaching career in 1964 as the coach of the freshman football team at Cornell University. He spent 11 years as an assistant coach at Cornell and was the defensive secondary coach from 1969 to 1974.

=== Cincinnati, Arizona, and Mississippi State ===
In 1975, Valesente was hired as the secondary coach at the University of Cincinnati under head coach Tony Mason. Valesente held that position for the 1975 and 1976 seasons. When Mason was hired as the head football coach at the University of Arizona in 1977, Valesente followed and assumed responsibility for the Arizona secondary. Valesente and Mason remained at Arizona from 1977 to 1979. In April 1980, Mason resigned after reportedly having been given a "quit-or-be-fired" option by the school. Three months later, Mason, Valesente and two others were indicted in Pima County Superior Court on charges that they had "bilked" the university out of $13,000 in travel funds. The Arizona coaches were alleged to have engaged in a conspiracy with an American Airlines employee in which the airline employee allegedly gave Mason and his coaching staff ticket receipts for trips they never took, which the coaches then submitted for reimbursement to the university. Valesente entered a not guilty plea to the charges. A jury found Mason not guilty following a trial in 1981, and Arizona Attorney General Bob Corbin announced in September 1981 that all remaining criminal charges had been dismissed against Valesente and the other defendants. Corbin also noted that a demand letter had been sent to Valesente requesting his return of $1,185 and that a civil action may be filed if the demand letter was not satisfied.

He was the defensive coordinator and linebackers coach at Mississippi State University from 1980 to 1981. While at Mississippi State, he helped direct the team to a win over the University of Kansas in the Hall of Fame Bowl in 1981.

=== Baltimore Colts ===
In February 1982, Valesente was hired by the Baltimore Colts as the secondary and special teams coach under new head coach Frank Kush. Valesente remained with the Colts for the 1982 and 1983 NFL seasons.

=== Kansas ===
In April 1984, Valesente was hired as the assistant head coach and offensive coordinator at the University of Kansas. Shortly after being hired at Kansas, he was admitted to the Kansas University Medical Center after suffering chest pains and underwent emergency heart bypass surgery. Valesente remained as offensive coordinator for the 1984 and 1985 seasons. He took over as the head coach for the Kansas Jayhawks football team in 1986 and 1987. During Valesente's two seasons as head coach, the Jayhawks compiled a record of 4–17–1 and went 0–13–1 against Big Eight Conference opponents. The Jayhawks went 1–9–1 in 1987 with their only win being a 16–15 game against Southern Illinois. Valesente was fired at the end of the 1987 football season. At the time of his firing, Valesente was in the second year of a four-year contract, which athletic director Bob Frederick said would be honored. Valesente told reporters, "I don't believe two years is enough to build a program. I just don't feel we've been given enough time." Valesente had undertaken efforts to improve the team's academic standing and noted, "I feel proud of the fact that we have begun to overcome some of the immense academic problems that have plagued us. We needed to first stop the academic attrition." Anthony Redwood, the chairman of the Kansas Athletic Corporation board and a business professor, resigned from the board in protest of the firing. Redwood noted, "Apparently we lack the courage at this institution to plan a course of action and stick with it. Certainly to the outside world this decision must call into question our commitment to the academic dimension of intercollegiate athletics." Valesente's .204 winning percentage is the second-worst for a non-interim coach in KU history.

=== Maryland and Pittsburgh ===
Valesente spent the 1988 season as the offensive coordinator and quarterbacks coach for the Maryland Terrapins football team. Valesente resigned after one year with Maryland.

In 1989, he served as the defensive coordinator for the Pitt Panthers football team and was fired after one season in the position.

=== Pittsburgh Steelers, Green Bay Packers and Carolina Panthers ===
In March 1990, he was hired by Chuck Noll as the linebackers coach for the Pittsburgh Steelers. After two years with the Steelers, Valesente was hired by the Green Bay Packers in January 1992 to serve as their linebackers coach. From 1995 to 1998, he was the defensive backs coach for the Green Bay Packers. In January 1999, George Seifert hired Valesente as defensive backs coach with the Carolina Panthers. After one year in Carolina, Valesente announced his retirement in March 2000. At the time, Valesente said, "After 37 years of coaching, I decided I needed to spend more time with my family to enjoy all life has to offer. Coaching is a very demanding career that doesn't allow much free time."

=== NFL Europe ===
Valesente later worked in the NFL Europe as a defensive coordinator for the Frankfurt Galaxy.

=== Amateur football in Europe ===
In 2010, he served as the defensive coordinator for the Kiel Baltic Hurricanes in the German Football League. Kiel won German Bowl XXXII that year and finished first in scoring defense, in overall defense and in passing defense. He left Kiel before the 2011 season because of health issues, but later returned to the sideline for one game during the German Bowl XXXIII loss to the Schwäbisch Hall Unicorns.

In December 2014, he was named defensive coordinator for the France national American football team, where he was reunited with head coach Patrick Esume, who was also his head coach in Kiel. In July 2015, France finish fourth at the 2015 IFAF World Championship, after a loss against Mexico, 20–7. In July 2017, he won the World Games championship against Germany with the France National team, 14–6.

== Family ==
Valesente and his wife have three children.

== Head coaching record ==
Year	Team	Overall	Conference	Standing
Kansas Jayhawks (Big Eight Conference) (1986–1987)
1986	Kansas	3–8	0–7	8th
1987	Kansas	1–9–1	0–6–1	T–7th
Kansas:		4–17–1	0–13–1	
Total:		4–17–1		
