= 1989 Iowa State Cyclones football team =

American college football season

1989 Iowa State Cyclones football
- Conference: Big Eight Conference
- Record: 6–5 (4–3 Big 8)
- Head coach: Jim Walden (3rd season)
- Defensive coordinator: Robin Ross (3rd season)
- Home stadium: Cyclone Stadium

1989 Big Eight Conference football standings
	Conf.					Overall
Team	W		L		T	W		L		T
No. 4 Colorado $	7	–	0	–	0	11	–	1	–	0
No. 11 Nebraska	6	–	1	–	0	10	–	2	–	0
Oklahoma	5	–	2	–	0	7	–	4	–	0
Iowa State	4	–	3	–	0	6	–	5	–	0
Oklahoma State	3	–	4	–	0	4	–	7	–	0
Kansas	2	–	5	–	0	4	–	7	–	0
Missouri	1	–	6	–	0	2	–	9	–	0
Kansas State	0	–	7	–	0	1	–	10	–	0
$ – Conference champion; Rankings from AP Poll

The 1989 Iowa State Cyclones football team represented Iowa State University as a member of the Big Eight Conference during the 1989 NCAA Division I-A football season. Led by third-year head coach Jim Walden, the Cyclones compiled an overall record of 6–5 with a mark of 4–3 in conference play, placing fourth in the Big 8. Iowa State played home games at Cyclone Stadium in Ames, Iowa.

This was the first time that Iowa State played against Minnesota since 1923. On October 8, 1923, Jack Trice, the first African-American to play football at Iowa State, died after suffering injuries in a game against Minnesota that occurred two days before his death. There was speculation that the injuries caused by the Minnesota players were intentional. Because of this, Iowa State did not renew their contract to play with Minnesota until the 1989 season.

== Schedule ==
Date	Time	Opponent	Site	TV	Result	Attendance	Source
September 9	7:00 p.m.	Ohio*	Cyclone Stadium; Ames, IA		W 28–3	41,614	
September 16	Noon	Minnesota*	Cyclone Stadium; Ames, IA		L 20–30	45,410	
September 23	Noon	Iowa*	Cyclone Stadium; Ames, IA (rivalry)	ABC	L 21–31	54,458	
September 30	7:00 p.m.	at Tulane*	Louisiana Superdome; New Orleans, LA		W 25–24	33,206	
October 7	1:00 p.m.	at Kansas	Memorial Stadium; Lawrence, KS		W 24–20	31,500	
October 14	Noon	No. 3 Colorado^{†}	Cyclone Stadium; Ames, IA		L 17–52	41,515	
October 21	1:00 p.m.	No. 25 Oklahoma	Cyclone Stadium; Ames, IA		L 40–43	40,812	
October 28	1:30 p.m.	at No. 4 Nebraska	Memorial Stadium; Lincoln, NE (rivalry)		L 17–49	76,371	
November 4	1:00 p.m.	Kansas State	Cyclone Stadium; Ames, IA (rivalry)		W 36–11	40,332	
November 11	1:30 p.m.	at Missouri	Faurot Field; Columbia, MO (rivalry)		W 35–21	36,538	
November 18	1:30 p.m.	at Oklahoma State	Lewis Field; Stillwater, OK		W 31–21	33,200	
*Non-conference game; ^{†}Homecoming; Rankings from AP Poll released prior to the game; All times are in Central time

== Roster ==
1989 Iowa State Cyclones football team roster
Players
Coaches
Offense

Pos.	#	Name	Class
TE	85	Mike Busch	Sr
QB	16	Brent Oberg	Sr
G	69	Keith Sims	Sr
RB	31	Paul Thibodeaux	Sr
OL	54	Trent Van Hoosen	Sr
OL	57	Rick Wells	Sr
RB	32	Ron Wilkinson	So
OL	72	Gene Williams	Jr

Defense

Pos.	#	Name	Class
DB	11	Marcus Robertson	Jr

Special teams

Pos.	#	Name	Class

Head coach

- Jim Walden

Coordinators/assistant coaches

Legend

- (C) Team captain
- (S) Suspended
- (I) Ineligible
- Injured
- Redshirt
