= 1986 Iowa State Cyclones football team =

American college football season

1986 Iowa State Cyclones football
- Conference: Big Eight Conference
- Record: 6–5 (3–4 Big 8)
- Head coach: Jim Criner (4th season; first 9 games); Chuck Banker (interim, final 2 games)
- Defensive coordinator: Phil Bennett (1st season)
- Home stadium: Cyclone Stadium

1986 Big Eight Conference football standings
	Conf.					Overall
Team	W		L		T	W		L		T
No. 3 Oklahoma $	7	–	0	–	0	11	–	1	–	0
Colorado	6	–	1	–	0	6	–	6	–	0
No. 5 Nebraska	5	–	2	–	0	10	–	2	–	0
Oklahoma State	4	–	3	–	0	6	–	5	–	0
Iowa State	3	–	4	–	0	6	–	5	–	0
Missouri	2	–	5	–	0	3	–	8	–	0
Kansas State	1	–	6	–	0	2	–	9	–	0
Kansas	0	–	7	–	0	3	–	8	–	0
$ – Conference champion; Rankings from AP Poll

The 1986 Iowa State Cyclones football team represented Iowa State University as a member of the Big Eight Conference during the 1986 NCAA Division I-A football season. The Cyclones were led by fourth-yead head coach Jim Criner for the first nine games of the season before he was fired and replaced by Chuck Banker as interim head coach. Iowa State compiled an overall record of 6–5 with a mark of 3–4 in conference play, placing fifth in the Big 8. The team played home games at Cyclone Stadium in Ames, Iowa.

== Schedule ==
Date	Time	Opponent	Site	TV	Result	Attendance	Source
September 13	11:40 am	at Iowa*	Kinnick Stadium; Iowa City, IA (rivalry)	TBS (regional)	L 7–43	67,700	
September 20	1:00 pm	Indiana State*	Cyclone Stadium; Ames, IA		W 64–9	36,650	
September 27	1:00 pm	Wichita State*	Cyclone Stadium; Ames, IA		W 36–14	35,212	
October 4	1:00 pm	Wyoming*^{†}	Cyclone Stadium; Ames, IA		W 21–10	39,710	
October 11	1:30 pm	at Kansas	Memorial Stadium; Lawrence, KS		W 13–10	20,500	
October 18	2:30 pm	at Colorado	Folsom Field; Boulder, CO		L 3–31	41,215	
October 25	1:00 pm	No. 5 Oklahoma	Cyclone Stadium; Ames, IA		L 0–38	43,190	
November 1	1:30 pm	at Missouri	Faurot Field; Columbia, MO (rivalry)		W 37–14	35,870	
November 8	11:40 am	No. 7 Nebraska	Cyclone Stadium; Ames, IA (rivalry)	Raycom	L 14–35	48,007	
November 15	1:00 pm	Kansas State	Cyclone Stadium; Ames, IA (rivalry)		W 48–19	32,305	
November 22	1:30 pm	at Oklahoma State	Lewis Field; Stillwater, OK		L 14–21	34,000	
*Non-conference game; ^{†}Homecoming; Rankings from AP Poll released prior to the game; All times are in Central time

== Game summaries ==
=== At Iowa ===
Iowa State at Iowa

Team	1	2	3	4	Total
Cyclones	0	0	0	7	7
• Hawkeyes	13	13	10	7	43

- Date: September 13
- Location: Kinnick Stadium, Iowa City, Iowa
- Game attendance: 67,700
- Television network: TBS

Scoring summary
Q1	IOWA	Houghtlin 32 yard field goal	IOWA 3–0
Q1	IOWA	Houghtlin 46 yard field goal	IOWA 6–0
Q1	IOWA	Mauro 43 yard pass from Vlasic (Houghtlin kick)	IOWA 13–0
Q2	IOWA	Hudson 1 yard run (pass failed)	IOWA 19–0
Q2	IOWA	Mauro 17 yard pass from Smith (Houghtlin kick)	IOWA 26–0
Q3	IOWA	Houghtlin 37 yard field goal	IOWA 29–0
Q3	IOWA	Mauro 47 yard pass from Vlasic (Houghtlin kick)	IOWA 36–0
Q4	IOWA	Bayless 32 yard run (Houghtlin kick)	IOWA 43–0
Q4	ISU	Brown 21 yard pass from Sadek (Frank kick)	IOWA 43–7

=== Oklahoma ===
#5 Oklahoma at Iowa State

Team	1	2	3	4	Total
• Sooners	7	10	7	14	38
Cyclones	0	0	0	0	0

- Date: October 25
- Location: Cyclone Stadium

=== Nebraska ===
#7 Nebraska at Iowa State

Team	1	2	3	4	Total
• Cornhuskers	7	0	14	14	35
Cyclones	0	14	0	0	14

- Date: November 8
- Location: Cyclone Stadium, Ames, Iowa
- Game attendance: 48,007
- Television network: Raycom

== Personnel ==
1986 Iowa State Cyclones football team roster
Players			Coaches
Offense: Pos. / # / Name / Class; QB / 11 / Alex Espinoza / Sr	Defense: Pos. / # / Name / Class	Special teams: Pos. / # / Name / Class	Head coach: Jim Criner; Coordinators/assistant coaches Legend: (C) Team captain; (S) Suspended; (I) Ineligible; Injured; Redshirt
