= Pat Jones (American football) =

American football player and coach (born 1947)

Biographical details
- Born: November 4, 1947 (age 78); Memphis, Tennessee, U.S.

Playing career
- 1965–1967: Arkansas Tech, Arkansas
- Positions: Linebacker, nose guard

Coaching career (HC unless noted)
- 1975: Arkansas (DL)
- 1976–1977: SMU (DE)
- 1978: Pittsburgh (DE)
- 1979–1983: Oklahoma State (assistant)
- 1984–1994: Oklahoma State
- 1996–2003: Miami Dolphins (TE)
- 2004–2006: Oakland Raiders (WR/TE)

Head coaching record
- Overall: 62–60–3
- Bowls: 3–1

Erwin Patrick Jones (born November 4, 1947) is an American former football player and coach. He served as the head football coach at Oklahoma State University–Stillwater from 1984 to 1994, compiling a record of 62–60–3.

Jones grew up in Little Rock, Arkansas, where he developed an intense interest in football at an early age. In junior high he was a lineman for the Forest Heights Eagles. He played guard for the Hall High Warriors and made All-State Honorable Mention in his senior year. In college, he played linebacker and nose guard at Arkansas Tech before transferring to Arkansas. Jones' coaching stops include Arkansas, SMU, Pittsburgh, and Oklahoma State where he coached Hall of Fame running backs Thurman Thomas and 1988 Heisman Trophy winner Barry Sanders.

Jones served as head coach of the Oklahoma State Cowboys from 1984 to 1994 after five years as an assistant under Jimmy Johnson. In 11 years at Oklahoma State, he compiled a 62–60–3 record, including three wins in four bowl games. Jones was the Big 8 Coach of the Year in 1984 and 1992. From 1984 to 1988, Jones led the Cowboys to the most successful period in school history at the time. With a talented roster that included running backs Barry Sanders and Thurman Thomas, wide receiver Hart Lee Dykes and quarterback Mike Gundy, they went 44–15 over this five-year stretch, including the school's first three ten-win seasons.

Days after the 1988 season, Oklahoma State and the NCAA released the results of an unusual joint investigation into the football program. The investigation revealed several major violations dating prior to Johnson's tenure, principally involvement in a "bidding war" for Dykes out of high school. The Cowboys were banned from bowl games for three years and from live television for two years, and they were also limited to 20 scholarships from 1989 to 1992. Jones was not directly implicated in any wrongdoing; indeed, the investigation found that no violations had taken place in two years. He was unable to put together another winning team due to the sanctions, and left OSU after the 1994 season. In Jones' last six years, the Cowboys won only seven games in Big Eight play, including three winless conference records. They bottomed out in 1991 with an 0-10-1 record that is still the worst in school history. As it turned out, they would need almost the entire decade of the 1990s to recover; they would only have one winning season from 1989 to 2001. His 62 wins would be the most in school history until Gundy passed him in 2012.

Jones was also an NFL assistant coach with the Miami Dolphins from 1996 to 2003 and Oakland Raiders from 2004 to 2006. He is a member of the Gator Bowl, Arkansas and Oklahoma Halls of Fame.

Jones retired from coaching and joined KYAL 97.1FM "The Sports Animal" in Tulsa on April 17, 2006. He can still be heard on "The Sports Animal Tulsa" each weekday along with WWLS (AM) "The Sports Animal" in Oklahoma City. Pat also provided in-studio gameday commentary for Fox Sports Southwest college football programming.

== Head coaching record ==
Year	Team	Overall	Conference	Standing	Bowl/playoffs	Coaches^{#}	AP^{°}
Oklahoma State Cowboys (Big Eight Conference) (1984–1994)
1984	Oklahoma State	10–2	5–2	3rd	W Gator	5	7
1985	Oklahoma State	8–4	4–3	T–3rd	L Gator		
1986	Oklahoma State	6–5	4–3	4th			
1987	Oklahoma State	10–2	5–2	3rd	W Sun	12	11
1988	Oklahoma State	10–2	5–2	3rd	W Holiday	11	11
1989	Oklahoma State	4–7	3–4	5th			
1990	Oklahoma State	4–7	2–5	T–6th			
1991	Oklahoma State	0–10–1	0–6–1	8th			
1992	Oklahoma State	4–6–1	2–4–1	5th			
1993	Oklahoma State	3–8	0–7	8th			
1994	Oklahoma State	3–7–1	0–6–1	T–7th			
Oklahoma State:		62–60–3	19–21–2				
Total:		62–60–3					
^{#}Rankings from final Coaches Poll.; ^{°}Rankings from final AP Poll.
