= 1989 Oklahoma Sooners football team =

American college football season

1989 Oklahoma Sooners football
- Conference: Big Eight Conference
- Record: 7–4 (5–2 Big 8)
- Head coach: Gary Gibbs (1st season)
- Offensive coordinator: Jim Donnan (5th season)
- Offensive scheme: Pro-style
- Defensive coordinator: Charlie Sadler (1st season)
- Base defense: 5–2
- Captains: Scott Evans; Ken McMichel; Leon Perry; Kevin Thompson; Mark Van Keirsbilck
- Home stadium: Oklahoma Memorial Stadium

1989 Big Eight Conference football standings
	Conf.					Overall
Team	W		L		T	W		L		T
No. 4 Colorado $	7	–	0	–	0	11	–	1	–	0
No. 11 Nebraska	6	–	1	–	0	10	–	2	–	0
Oklahoma	5	–	2	–	0	7	–	4	–	0
Iowa State	4	–	3	–	0	6	–	5	–	0
Oklahoma State	3	–	4	–	0	4	–	7	–	0
Kansas	2	–	5	–	0	4	–	7	–	0
Missouri	1	–	6	–	0	2	–	9	–	0
Kansas State	0	–	7	–	0	1	–	10	–	0
$ – Conference champion; Rankings from AP Poll

The 1989 Oklahoma Sooners football team represented University of Oklahoma during the 1989 NCAA Division I-A football season. They played their home games at Oklahoma Memorial Stadium and competed as members of the Big Eight Conference. They were coached by first-year head coach Gary Gibbs. They were ineligible to participate in a bowl game since they were on probation. In addition, the Sooners were not allowed to appear on live television, although all their games were taped delayed and shown late Saturday nights on the Sooner Later Network and a few on Prime Network.

== Schedule ==
Date	Time	Opponent	Rank	Site	TV	Result	Attendance	Source
September 2	1:30 p.m.	New Mexico State*	No. 15	Oklahoma Memorial Stadium; Norman, OK	Sooner Later	W 73–3	73,250	
September 9	1:30 p.m.	Baylor*	No. 8	Oklahoma Memorial Stadium; Norman, OK	Sooner Later	W 33–7	74,600	
September 16	8:00 p.m.	at Arizona*	No. 6	Arizona Stadium; Tucson, AZ	Sooner Later	L 3–6	50,931	
September 30	1:30 p.m.	at Kansas	No. 16	Memorial Stadium; Lawrence, KS	PSN	W 45–6	44,500	
October 7	1:30 p.m.	Oklahoma State	No. 16	Oklahoma Memorial Stadium; Norman, OK (Bedlam Series)	Sooner Later	W 37–15	74,610	
October 14	2:00 p.m.	vs. Texas*	No. 15	Cotton Bowl; Dallas, TX (Red River Shootout)	PSN	L 24–28	75,587	
October 21	1:00 p.m.	at Iowa State	No. 20	Cyclone Stadium; Ames, IA	Sooner Later	W 43–40	40,812	
October 28	1:30 p.m.	No. 3 Colorado		Oklahoma Memorial Stadium; Norman, OK	Sooner Later	L 3–20	75,004	
November 4	1:30 p.m.	Missouri		Oklahoma Memorial Stadium; Norman, OK (rivalry)	Sooner Later	W 52–14	72,300	
November 11	1:30 p.m.	Kansas State		Oklahoma Memorial Stadium; Norman, OK	Sooner Later	W 42–19	71,000	
November 18	1:30 p.m.	at No. 6 Nebraska		Memorial Stadium; Lincoln, NE (rivalry)	Sooner Later	L 25–42	76,404	
*Non-conference game; Rankings from AP Poll released prior to the game; All times are in Central time

== Rankings ==
Ranking movements Legend: ██ Increase in ranking ██ Decrease in ranking — = Not ranked
	Week																
Poll	Pre	1	2	3	4	5	6	7	8	9	10	11	12	13	14	15	Final
AP	15	8	6	16	16	16	15	20	—	—	—	—	—	—	—	—	—
Coaches	—	—	—	—	—	—	—	—	—	—	—	—	—	—	—	—	—

== Preseason ==
Quarterback Charles Thompson was arrested in February 1989 for selling cocaine to an undercover FBI agent. Barry Switzer resigned on June 9 amid player misconduct and allegations of recruiting violations, five players had been arrested on felony charges, and the NCAA placed the Sooners on probation, with penalties that included reduced scholarships and a postseason ban for the 1989 and 1990 seasons.

== Game summaries ==
=== vs Texas ===
#15 Oklahoma Sooners (4–1) vs. Texas Longhorns (2–2)

Quarter	1	2	3	4	Total
Oklahoma	7	0	7	10	24
Texas	15	6	0	7	28

at Cotton Bowl, Dallas, Texas

- Date: October 14, 1989
- Game weather: Partly cloudy, 86 °F (30 °C)
- Game attendance: 75,587
- Referee: George Hayward
- TV: PSN
- Box Score, Box Score

Team	Category	Player	Statistics
Oklahoma	Passing		
Oklahoma	Rushing	Mike Gaddis	14 Rush, 130 Yds, TD
Oklahoma	Receiving		
Texas	Passing	Peter Gardere	15/23, 144 Yds, 2 TD, INT
Texas	Rushing	Adrian Walker	16 Rush, 71 Yds
Texas	Receiving	Johnny Walker	5 Rec, 62 Yds, TD

Scoring summary

Quarter	Time	Drive			Team	Scoring information	Score	
Quarter	Time	Plays	Yards	TOP	Team	Scoring information	OU	UT
1	10:02	11	80	4:58	Texas	Tony Jones 7-yard touchdown reception from Peter Gardere, Wayne Clements kick good	0	7
1	8:22	3	71	1:40	Oklahoma	Mike Gaddis 62-yard touchdown run, R.D. Lashar kick good	7	7
1	1:56				Texas	Fumble recovery returned 44 yards for touchdown by Mical Padgett, 2-point pass good	7	15
2	9:39	4	-13	1:07	Texas	42-yard field goal by Wayne Clements	7	18
2	1:16	7	31	2:49	Texas	49-yard field goal by Wayne Clements	7	21
3	6:20	9	83	2:22	Oklahoma	Artie Guess 41-yard touchdown reception from Tink Collins, R.D. Lashar kick good	14	21
4	11:44	5	50	2:08	Oklahoma	44-yard field goal by R.D. Lashar	17	21
4	3:42	8	51	3:10	Oklahoma	Ike Lewis 1-yard touchdown run, R.D. Lashar kick good	24	21
4	1:33	7	66	2:09	Texas	Johnny Walker 25-yard touchdown reception from Peter Gardere, Wayne Clements kick good	24	28
"TOP" = time of possession. For other American football terms, see Glossary of American football.							24	28

=== Colorado ===
#3 Colorado Buffaloes (6–0) at Oklahoma Sooners (5–1)

Quarter	1	2	3	4	Total
Colorado	0	10	0	10	20
Oklahoma	0	0	0	3	3

at Oklahoma Memorial Stadium, Norman, Oklahoma

- Date: October 28
- Game attendance: 75,004
- TV: KWGN
- Box Score
- Oklahoma shut out in the first half for first time since 1965

== Roster ==
1989 Oklahoma Sooners football team roster
Players
Coaches
Offense

Pos.	#	Name	Class
QB	15	Joey Alford	Fr
WR	44	Wade Auld	Jr
G	63	Mark Blodgett	So
RB	6	Dewell Brewer	Fr
WR	36	Eric Bross	Sr
WR	16	Chris Cabbiness	Jr
OL	76	James Cargill	Fr
QB	10	Steve Collins	Fr
QB	9	Tink Collins	Fr
TE	43	Adrian Cooper	Jr
C	61	Tom Decker	So
TE	86	Billy Dykes	So
RB	20	Reggie Finch	Fr
RB	7	Rod Fisher	So
WR	88	Ronnie Fletcher	Fr
C	79	Eric Fultz	So
RB	32	Mike Gaddis	So
WR	18	Artie Guess	Jr
FB	19	Scott Harper	Jr
OT	70	Brandon Houston	Fr
TE	89	Ronnie Hull	Fr
RB	27	Corey Johnson	Fr
OT	71	Harold Jones	Jr
G	58	Jason Keith	Fr
TB	1	Ike Lewis	So
RB	3	Ted Long	So
OT	64	Terran Manning	Jr
FB	31	Mike McKinley	So
G	62	Larry Medice	Jr
QB	17	Chris Melson	So
TE	82	Joey Mickey	Fr
G	57	Jeff Miller	Jr
WR	83	John Nelson	Fr
QB	4	Tommy O'Hara	Fr
WR	21	Darron Osborn	Jr
TE	85	Jon Page	Jr
FB	2	Leon Perry (C)	Sr
TE	81	Zarak Peters	Jr
FB	33	Kenyon Rasheed	Fr
G	54	Mike Sawatzky	Jr
TE	80	Pete Schmitt	Fr
QB	8	William Shankle	Fr
RB	24	Don Smitherman	Sr
FB	34	William Steines	Fr
WR	11	Otis Taylor	Fr
RB	25	Travis Thompson	Fr
OT	76	Mark Van Keirsbilck (C)	Sr
C	50	Randy Wallace	So
RB	26	Darren Ward	Fr
OT	74	Chris Watkins	Fr
C	59	Greg Williams	Sr
C	65	Mike Wise	Sr
G	75	Dalton Young	So

Defense

Pos.	#	Name	Class
DL	95	Russell Allen	Fr
DT	85	Tom Backes	Jr
DT	56	James Baldwin	Fr
LB	40	Reggie Barnes	Fr
LB	38	Randall Base	Fr
DB	28	Jonnie Bell	Fr
DB	29	Jason Belser	So
LB	35	Frank Blevins	Jr
LB	45	Joe Bowden	Fr
LB	60	Jim Boyd	Sr
DE	42	John Bradley	So
DT	66	Brian Brauninger	So
DB	49	Guy Brown	Jr
DB	14	Melvin Carter	Fr
LB	41	Mike Coats	Fr
LB	43	Bart Daniels	Fr
DB	48	Greg DeQuasie	So
DE	34	Wayne Dickson	Sr
DT	77	Stacey Dillard	So
DE	69	Greg Dixon	Sr
DB	26	Terry Duncan	So
DT	78	Scott Evans	Jr
DT	94	Mike Filson	Fr
DB	15	Charles Franks	So
DE	39	James Goode	Jr
DE	47	Tracy Gordon	Jr
DE	53	Tony Han	Jr
DT	96	Darrell Kirby	Jr
DL	91	Brent Koontz	Fr
DE	97	Proctor Land	So
LB	46	Corey Mayfield	So
DB	8	Freddie McCline	Fr
DB	12	Ken McMichel (C)	Sr
DB	22	Clyde Neugent	Fr
DB	17	Pete Norwood	Fr
DL	87	Shad Patrick	Fr
DB	19	Terry Ray	So
DB	21	Lance Swanson	So
DB	22	Kevin Thompson (C)	Sr
DE	88	Trey Tippens	Fr
DT	98	Dante Williams	Sr
LB	30	Chris Wilson	So
DE	90	Fred Woods	Fr
DL	92	Ricky Wren	Fr

Special teams

Pos.	#	Name	Class
K	97	Barry Blanton	Fr
K	13	R. D. Lashar	Jr
K	93	Sean Patterson	Jr
P	84	Brad Reddell	Fr
P	87	Marty Wells	Fr

Head coach

- Gary Gibbs

Coordinators/assistant coaches

- Jim Donnan – Offensive coordinator
- Mike Jones – Running backs and wide receivers
- Charley North – Tight ends and special teams
- Charlie Sadler – Defensive coordinator
- John Blake – Defensive line
- Lucious Selmon – Outside linebacker and defensive end
- Bobby Proctor – Defensive backs

Legend

- (C) Team captain
- (S) Suspended
- (I) Ineligible
- Injured
- Redshirt

Roster

== Awards ==
- All-Big Eight: LB Frank Blevins, DT Scott Evans, NG Dante Williams

== NFL draft ==
The following players were drafted into the National Football League following the season.

Round	Pick	Player	Position	NFL team
6	162	Kevin Thompson	Defensive back	Philadelphia Eagles
9	230	Leon Perry	Running back	Los Angeles Raiders
12	330	Ken McMichel	Defensive back	Phoenix Cardinals
