= 1989 Oklahoma State Cowboys football team =

American college football season

1989 Oklahoma State Cowboys football
- Conference: Big Eight Conference
- Record: 4–7 (3–4 Big 8)
- Head coach: Pat Jones (6th season)
- Offensive coordinator: Larry Coker (7th season)
- Defensive coordinator: Bill Miller (1st season)
- Home stadium: Lewis Field

1989 Big Eight Conference football standings
| | Conf. | | | | | Overall |
| Team | W | | L | | T | W | | L | | T |
|---|---|---|---|---|---|---|---|---|---|---|
| No. 4 Colorado $ | 7 | – | 0 | – | 0 | 11 | – | 1 | – | 0 |
| No. 11 Nebraska | 6 | – | 1 | – | 0 | 10 | – | 2 | – | 0 |
| Oklahoma | 5 | – | 2 | – | 0 | 7 | – | 4 | – | 0 |
| Iowa State | 4 | – | 3 | – | 0 | 6 | – | 5 | – | 0 |
| Oklahoma State | 3 | – | 4 | – | 0 | 4 | – | 7 | – | 0 |
| Kansas | 2 | – | 5 | – | 0 | 4 | – | 7 | – | 0 |
| Missouri | 1 | – | 6 | – | 0 | 2 | – | 9 | – | 0 |
| Kansas State | 0 | – | 7 | – | 0 | 1 | – | 10 | – | 0 |
$ – Conference champion; Rankings from AP Poll

The 1989 Oklahoma State Cowboys football team represented Oklahoma State University as a member of the Big Eight Conference during the 1989 NCAA Division I-A football season. Led by sixth-year head coach Pat Jones, the Cowboys compiled an overall record of 4–7 with a mark of 3–4 in conference play, placing fifth in the Big 8. Oklahoma State played home games at Lewis Field in Stillwater, Oklahoma.

== Schedule ==
| Date | Time | Opponent | Site | Result | Attendance | Source |
|---|---|---|---|---|---|---|
| September 9 | 6:00 p.m. | at Tulsa* | Skelly Stadium; Tulsa, OK (rivalry) | L 10–20 | 40,785 | |
| September 16 | 12:30 p.m. | at Ohio State* | Ohio Stadium; Columbus, OH | L 13–37 | 88,670 | |
| September 23 | 6:30 p.m. | Texas Tech* | Lewis Field; Stillwater, OK | L 15–31 | 40,200 | |
| September 30 | 6:30 p.m. | Wyoming* | Lewis Field; Stillwater, OK | W 27–7 | 40,200 | |
| October 7 | 1:30 p.m. | at No. 16 Oklahoma | Oklahoma Memorial Stadium; Norman, OK (Bedlam Series) | L 15–37 | 74,610 | |
| October 14 | 3:00 p.m. | Kansas State^{†} | Lewis Field; Stillwater, OK | W 17–13 | 40,100 | |
| October 21 | 1:30 p.m. | No. 4 Nebraska | Lewis Field; Stillwater, OK | L 23–48 | 40,000 | |
| October 28 | 1:30 p.m. | at Missouri | Faurot Field; Columbia, MO | W 31–30 | 42,463 | |
| November 4 | 1:00 p.m. | at Kansas | Memorial Stadium; Lawrence, KS | W 37–24 | 28,500 | |
| November 11 | 1:30 p.m. | No. 2 Colorado | Lewis Field; Stillwater, OK | L 17–41 | 41,500 | |
| November 18 | 1:30 p.m. | Iowa State | Lewis Field; Stillwater, OK | L 21–31 | 33,200 | |
*Non-conference game; ^{†}Homecoming; Rankings from AP Poll released prior to the game; All times are in Central time

== Personnel ==
1989 Oklahoma State Cowboys football team roster
Players
Coaches
Offense

| Pos. | # | Name | Class |
|---|---|---|---|
| OL | | Josh Arrott |
| RB | | Vernon Brown |
| TE | | Scott Copeland |
| OL | | Brent Davis |
| RB | | Ronnie Fisher |
| QB | | Kenny Ford |
| WR | | Jarrod Green |
| QB | | Mike Gundy | Sr |
| RB | | Gerald Hudson |
| WR | | Robert Kirksey |
| WR | | Curtis Mayfield |
| WR | | Brent Parker |
| OL | | Keith Roller |
| QB | | Chris Smith |
| OL | | Pete Surette |
| TE | | Vance Vice |
| TE | | Mark Walker |
| OL | | Scott Webb |
| QB | | Earl Wheeler |
| RB | | Cecil Wilson |

Defense

| Pos. | # | Name | Class |
|---|---|---|---|
| LB | | George Bright |
| DB | | Cornell Cannon |
| DB | | Mike Clark |
| DL | | Brandon Colbert |
| LB | | Sim Drain |
| DB | | Jay Fleischman |
| DB | | Joe King |
| DL | | Shawn Mackey |
| DL | | Ruben Oliver |
| DL | | Stacey Satterwhite |
| DB | | Rod Smith |
| LB | | Mike Woolridge |

Special teams

| Pos. | # | Name | Class |
|---|---|---|---|
| K, P | | Cary Blanchard |

Head coach

- Pat Jones

Coordinators/assistant coaches

- Larry Coker – Offensive coordinator
- Houston Nutt – Quarterback/Wide receivers
- Bill Shimek – Running backs
- Steve Gardner – Tight ends
- Denver Johnson – Offensive line
- Bill Miller – Defensive coordinator
- George Walstad – Defensive line
- Kenith Pope – Defensive ends
- Brent Guy – Linebackers

Legend

- (C) Team captain
- (S) Suspended
- (I) Ineligible
- Injured
- Redshirt

== Game summaries ==
=== At Ohio State ===
Oklahoma State Cowboys (0–1) at Ohio State Buckeyes (0–0)

| Quarter | 1 | 2 | 3 | 4 | Total |
|---|---|---|---|---|---|
| Oklahoma St | 7 | 6 | 0 | 0 | 13 |
| Ohio St | 6 | 10 | 14 | 7 | 37 |

at Ohio Stadium, Columbus, Ohio

- Date: September 16
- Game time: 1:30 p.m.
- Game weather: Overcast, 66 °F (19 °C)
- Game attendance: 88,670
- Referee: John Nealon
- Box Score

Game information

First quarter

- OHST – Carlos Snow 20-yard run (pass failed), 9:51. Ohio St 6–0. Drive: 4 plays, 39 yards, 0:54.
- OKST – Curtis Mayfield 21-yard pass from Mike Gundy (Cary Blanchard kick), 4:57. Oklahoma St 7–6. Drive: 3 plays, 26 yards, 1:02.

Second quarter

- OKST – Cary Blanchard 20-yard field goal, 12:00. Oklahoma St 10–6. Drive: 11 plays, 50 yards, 5:16.
- OHST – Pat O'Morrow 46-yard field goal, 7:32. Oklahoma St 10–9. Drive: 10 plays, 54 yards, 4:23.
- OKST – Cary Blanchard 33-yard field goal, 0:32. Oklahoma St 13–9. Drive: 15 plays, 63 yards, 7:00.
- OHST – Carlos Snow 2-yard run (Pat O'Morrow kick), 0:07. Ohio St 16–13. Drive: 2 plays, 59 yards, 0:20.

Third quarter

- OHST – Bernard Edwards 33-yard pass from Greg Frey (Pat O'Morrow kick), 9:17. Ohio St 23–13. Drive: 6 plays, 80 yards, 1:34.
- OHST – Scottie Graham 1-yard run (Pat O'Morrow kick), 1:47. Ohio St 30–13. Drive: 9 plays, 73 yards, 4:55.

Fourth quarter

- OHST – Bobby Olive 27-yard pass from Greg Frey (Pat O'Morrow kick), 10:21. Ohio St 37–13. Drive: 7 plays, 55 yards, 3:13.

Top passers

- OKST – Mike Gundy – 6/14, 55 yards, TD, 2 INT
- OHST – Greg Frey – 16/21, 205 yards, 2 TD, INT

Top rushers

- OKST – Gerald Hudson – 29 rushes, 146 yards
- OHST – Carlos Snow – 12 rushes, 67 yards, 2 TD

Top receivers

- OKST – Curtis Mayfield – 4 receptions, 44 yards, TD
- OHST – Bobby Olive – 5 receptions, 108 yards, TD
