= 1986 Oklahoma State Cowboys football team =

American college football season

1986 Oklahoma State Cowboys football
- Conference: Big Eight Conference
- Record: 6–5 (4–3 Big 8)
- Head coach: Pat Jones (3rd season)
- Offensive coordinator: Larry Coker (4th season)
- Defensive coordinator: Louis Campbell (2nd season)
- Home stadium: Lewis Field

1986 Big Eight Conference football standings
	Conf.					Overall
Team	W		L		T	W		L		T
No. 3 Oklahoma $	7	–	0	–	0	11	–	1	–	0
Colorado	6	–	1	–	0	6	–	6	–	0
No. 5 Nebraska	5	–	2	–	0	10	–	2	–	0
Oklahoma State	4	–	3	–	0	6	–	5	–	0
Iowa State	3	–	4	–	0	6	–	5	–	0
Missouri	2	–	5	–	0	3	–	8	–	0
Kansas State	1	–	6	–	0	2	–	9	–	0
Kansas	0	–	7	–	0	3	–	8	–	0
$ – Conference champion; Rankings from AP Poll

The 1986 Oklahoma State Cowboys football team represented Oklahoma State University in the Big Eight Conference during the 1986 NCAA Division I-A football season. In their third season under head coach Pat Jones, the Cowboys compiled a 6–5 record (4–3 against conference opponents), finished in fourth place in the conference, and were outscored by opponents by a combined total of 191 to 181.

The team's statistical leaders included Thurman Thomas with 741 rushing yards, Mike Gundy with 1,525 passing yards, and Hart Lee Dykes with 814 receiving yards and 42 points scored.

The team played its home games at Lewis Field in Stillwater, Oklahoma.

== Schedule ==
Date	Opponent	Site	Result	Attendance	Source
September 6	at Southwestern Louisiana*	Cajun Field; Lafayette, LA	W 21–20	23,144	
September 13	at Tulsa*	Skelly Stadium; Tulsa, OK (rivalry)	L 23–27	41,235	
September 20	Houston*	Lewis Field; Stillwater, OK	L 12–28	38,600	
September 27	Illinois State*	Lewis Field; Stillwater, OK	W 23–7	38,600	
October 11	at No. 3 Nebraska	Memorial Stadium; Lincoln, NE	L 10–30	76,041	
October 18	at No. 5 Oklahoma	Oklahoma Memorial Stadium; Norman, OK (Bedlam Series)	L 0–19	76,022	
October 25	Kansas^{†}	Lewis Field; Stillwater, OK	W 24–6	46,400	
November 1	Colorado	Lewis Field; Stillwater, OK	L 14–31	36,900	
November 8	at Kansas State	KSU Stadium; Manhattan, KS	W 23–3	21,270	
November 22	Iowa State	Lewis Field; Stillwater, OK	W 21–14	34,000	
December 4	Missouri	Lewis Field; Stillwater, OK	W 10–6	24,000	
*Non-conference game; ^{†}Homecoming; Rankings from AP Poll released prior to the game

== Game summaries ==
=== At Nebraska ===
Oklahoma State at Nebraska

Team	1	2	3	4	Total
Cowboys	0	10	0	0	10
• No. 3 Cornhuskers	14	7	9	0	30

- Date: October 11, 1986
- Location: Memorial Stadium, Lincoln, Nebraska
- Game attendance: 76,041

In the second ever night game at Memorial Stadium, Nebraska won for the 25th straight time over the Cowboys.

=== At Oklahoma ===
Team	1	2	3	4	Total
Cowboys	0	0	0	0	0
• No. 5 Sooners	3	3	3	10	19

- Date: October 18
- Location: Oklahoma Memorial Stadium
  Norman, OK
- Game attendance: 76,022

== Roster ==
1986 Oklahoma State Cowboys football team roster
Players
Coaches
Offense

Pos.	#	Name	Class
WR	11	Hart Lee Dykes	So
QB	12	Mike Gundy	Fr
RB	21	Barry Sanders	Fr
RB	34	Thurman Thomas	Jr

Defense

Pos.	#	Name	Class
DB	44	Mark Moore	Sr

Special teams

Pos.	#	Name	Class

Head coach

- Pat Jones

Coordinators/assistant coaches

- Larry Coker – Offensive coordinator
- Houston Nutt – Quarterback/Wide receivers
- Bill Shimek – Running backs
- Steve Gardner – Tight ends
- Brad Seely – Offensive line
- Louis Campbell – Defensive coordinator/defensive backs
- George Walstad – Defensive line
- Jonny Barr – Outside linebackers
- Kevin Steele – Linebackers

Legend

- (C) Team captain
- (S) Suspended
- (I) Ineligible
- Injured
- Redshirt

== After the season ==
The 1987 NFL draft was held on April 28–29, 1987. The following Cowboy was selected.

Round	Pick	Player	Position	NFL club
4	104	Mark Moore	Defensive back	Seattle Seahawks
