= 1989 Kansas State Wildcats football team =

American college football season

1989 Kansas State Wildcats football
- Conference: Big Eight Conference
- Record: 1–10 (0–7 Big 8)
- Head coach: Bill Snyder (1st season)
- Offensive coordinator: Del Miller (1st season)
- Offensive scheme: Multiple
- Defensive coordinator: Bob Cope (1st season)
- Base defense: 4–3
- Home stadium: KSU Stadium

1989 Big Eight Conference football standings
	Conf.					Overall
Team	W		L		T	W		L		T
No. 4 Colorado $	7	–	0	–	0	11	–	1	–	0
No. 11 Nebraska	6	–	1	–	0	10	–	2	–	0
Oklahoma	5	–	2	–	0	7	–	4	–	0
Iowa State	4	–	3	–	0	6	–	5	–	0
Oklahoma State	3	–	4	–	0	4	–	7	–	0
Kansas	2	–	5	–	0	4	–	7	–	0
Missouri	1	–	6	–	0	2	–	9	–	0
Kansas State	0	–	7	–	0	1	–	10	–	0
$ – Conference champion; Rankings from AP Poll

The 1989 Kansas State Wildcats football team represented Kansas State University in the 1989 NCAA Division I-A football season. The team's head football coach was Bill Snyder. The Wildcats played their home games in KSU Stadium. The season saw the Wildcats finish with a record of 1–10, and a 0–7 record in Big Eight Conference play. This was Snyder's first season as head coach. It also saw K-State pick up its first win in 31 games, dating back to the 29–12 win against Kansas on October 18, 1986.

== Schedule ==
Date	Time	Opponent	Site	Result	Attendance	Source
September 9	9:00 p.m.	at Arizona State*	Sun Devil Stadium; Tempe, AZ	L 0–31	68,606	
September 16	1:10 p.m.	Northern Iowa*	KSU Stadium; Manhattan, KS	L 8–10	28,275	
September 23	1:10 p.m.	Northern Illinois*	KSU Stadium; Manhattan, KS	L 20–37	20,256	
September 30	1:10 p.m.	North Texas*	KSU Stadium; Manhattan, KS	W 20–17	26,564	
October 7	1:30 p.m.	at No. 4 Nebraska	Memorial Stadium; Lincoln, NE (rivalry)	L 7–58	76,265	
October 14	3:00 p.m.	at Oklahoma State	Lewis Field; Stillwater, OK	L 13–17	40,100	
October 21	1:10 p.m.	Missouri	KSU Stadium; Manhattan, KS	L 9–21	29,492	
October 28	1:10 p.m.	Kansas^{†}	KSU Stadium; Manhattan, KS (rivalry)	L 16–21	35,652	
November 4	1:00 p.m.	at Iowa State	Cyclone Stadium; Ames, IA (rivalry)	L 11–36	40,332	
November 11	1:30 p.m.	at Oklahoma	Oklahoma Memorial Stadium; Norman, OK	L 19–42	71,000	
November 18	12:10 p.m.	No. 2 Colorado	KSU Stadium; Manhattan, KS (rivalry)	L 11–59	20,117	
*Non-conference game; ^{†}Homecoming; Rankings from AP Poll released prior to the game; All times are in Central time

== Game summaries ==
=== North Texas ===
#1 (I-AA) North Texas Mean Green at Kansas State Wildcats (0–3)

Quarter	1	2	Total
North Texas			0
Kansas State			0

at KSU Stadium, Manhattan, Kansas

- Date: September 30, 1989

Game information
Fourth quarter
- UNT – Carl Brewer 47-yard pass from Scott Davis (kick good), 1:35. North Texas 17-14.
- KSU – Frank Hernandez 12-yard pass from Carl Straw (no kick), 0:00. Kansas St 20-14. Drive: 9 plays, 85 yards.

Kansas State snapped 30-game winless streak (since 1986) and fans tore down the goalposts

External videos
- Final Kansas St drive

== Roster ==
1989 Kansas State Wildcats football team roster
Players
Coaches
Offense

Pos.	#	Name	Class
RB		David Bowman
RB		Richard Boyd
TE		Russ Campbell
QB, P		Chris Cobb
RB		Antoine Dulan
OL		Chad Faulkner
OL		Shawn Fleming
TE		Alan Friedrich
WR		Eric Gallon
QB		Matt Garber
WR		Frank Hernandez
OL		Eric Herrick
RB		D. Hudson
RB		Pat Jackson
TE		Al Jones
RB		Sonny Ray Jones
OL		Toby Lawrence
RB		Curtis Madden
OL		Will McCain
OL		Mike Orr
RB		Terry Richards
WR		Michael Smith
QB		Carl Straw
QB		Paul Watson
WR		Mike Wheeler
OL		Paul Yniguez

Defense

Pos.	#	Name	Class
DL		Elijah Alexander
LB	44	Brooks Barta	Fr
DL		John Crawford
DL		Ramon Davenport
LB		James Enin-Okut
DL		Ekwensi Griffith
DB		Erick Harper
LB		Matt Hennesy
DL		Maurice Henry
DB		Tyreese Herds
DL		Robert Hubbell
DB		Marcus Miller
DB		Danny Needham
LB		Chris Patterson
DB		Dimitrie Scott
DL		Anthony Williams

Special teams

Pos.	#	Name	Class
K		David Kruger

Head coach

- Bill Snyder

Coordinators/assistant coaches

- Del Miller – Offensive Coordinator
- Bob Cope – Defensive Coordinator
- John Latina – Offensive line & running game coordinator
- Dana Dimel – Offensive line
- Kevin Ramsey – Outside linebacker
- Bob Stoops – Defensive backs
- Nick Quartaro – Assistant
- Mike Nelson – Assistant
- Tom Grogan – Assistant
- Charlie Coe – Assistant

Legend

- (C) Team captain
- (S) Suspended
- (I) Ineligible
- Injured
- Redshirt
