= 1986 Missouri Tigers football team =

American college football season

1986 Missouri Tigers football
- Conference: Big Eight Conference
- Record: 3–8 (2–5 Big 8)
- Head coach: Woody Widenhofer (2nd season)
- Offensive coordinator: Bill Meyers (2nd season)
- Defensive coordinator: James McKinley (2nd season)
- Home stadium: Faurot Field

1986 Big Eight Conference football standings
	Conf.					Overall
Team	W		L		T	W		L		T
No. 3 Oklahoma $	7	–	0	–	0	11	–	1	–	0
Colorado	6	–	1	–	0	6	–	6	–	0
No. 5 Nebraska	5	–	2	–	0	10	–	2	–	0
Oklahoma State	4	–	3	–	0	6	–	5	–	0
Iowa State	3	–	4	–	0	6	–	5	–	0
Missouri	2	–	5	–	0	3	–	8	–	0
Kansas State	1	–	6	–	0	2	–	9	–	0
Kansas	0	–	7	–	0	3	–	8	–	0
$ – Conference champion; Rankings from AP Poll

The 1986 Missouri Tigers football team was an American football team that represented the University of Missouri in the Big Eight Conference (Big 8) during the 1986 NCAA Division I-A football season. The team compiled a 3–8 record (2–5 against Big 8 opponents), finished in sixth place in the Big 8, and was outscored by opponents by a combined total of 314 to 196. Woody Widenhofer was the head coach for the second of four seasons. The team played its home games at Faurot Field in Columbia, Missouri.

The team's statistical leaders included Darrell Wallace with 872 rushing yards, Ronnie Cameron with 654 passing yards, and Robert Delpino with 299 receiving yards.

== Schedule ==
Date	Opponent	Site	Result	Attendance	Source
September 13	Utah State*	Faurot Field; Columbia, MO	W 24–10	35,548	
September 20	Texas*	Faurot Field; Columbia, MO	L 25–27	46,227	
September 27	Indiana*	Faurot Field; Columbia, MO	L 24–41	40,606	
October 4	at Syracuse*	Carrier Dome; Syracuse, NY	L 9–41	41,035	
October 11	Colorado	Faurot Field; Columbia, MO	L 12–17	42,780	
October 18	at Nebraska	Memorial Stadium; Lincoln, NE (rivalry)	L 17–48	76,005	
October 25	at Kansas State	KSU Stadium; Manhattan, KS	W 17–6	19,850	
November 1	Iowa State	Faurot Field; Columbia, MO (rivalry)	L 14–37	35,870	
November 8	at No. 4 Oklahoma	Oklahoma Memorial Stadium; Norman, OK (rivalry)	L 0–77	75,480	
November 22	Kansas	Faurot Field; Columbia, MO (Border War)	W 48–0	33,553	
December 4	at Oklahoma State	Lewis Field; Stillwater, OK	L 6–10	24,000	
*Non-conference game; Rankings from AP Poll released prior to the game
