= 1986 Kansas Jayhawks football team =

American college football season

1986 Kansas Jayhawks football
- Conference: Big Eight Conference
- Record: 3–8 (0–7 Big 8)
- Head coach: Bob Valesente (1st season)
- Captains: Phil Forte; Mike Orth; Paul Oswald; Wayne Ziegler; John Randolph
- Home stadium: Memorial Stadium

1986 Big Eight Conference football standings
| | Conf. | | | | | Overall |
| Team | W | | L | | T | W | | L | | T |
|---|---|---|---|---|---|---|---|---|---|---|
| No. 3 Oklahoma $ | 7 | – | 0 | – | 0 | 11 | – | 1 | – | 0 |
| Colorado | 6 | – | 1 | – | 0 | 6 | – | 6 | – | 0 |
| No. 5 Nebraska | 5 | – | 2 | – | 0 | 10 | – | 2 | – | 0 |
| Oklahoma State | 4 | – | 3 | – | 0 | 6 | – | 5 | – | 0 |
| Iowa State | 3 | – | 4 | – | 0 | 6 | – | 5 | – | 0 |
| Missouri | 2 | – | 5 | – | 0 | 3 | – | 8 | – | 0 |
| Kansas State | 1 | – | 6 | – | 0 | 2 | – | 9 | – | 0 |
| Kansas | 0 | – | 7 | – | 0 | 3 | – | 8 | – | 0 |
$ – Conference champion; Rankings from AP Poll

The 1986 Kansas Jayhawks football team represented the University of Kansas in the Big Eight Conference during the 1986 NCAA Division I-A football season. In their first season under head coach Bob Valesente, the Jayhawks compiled a 3–8 record (0–7 against conference opponents), tied for last place in the conference, and were outscored by opponents by a combined total of 327 to 112. They played their home games at Memorial Stadium in Lawrence, Kansas.

The team's statistical leaders included Mike Orth with 1,548 passing yards, Arnold Snell with 672 rushing yards, and Ronnie Caldwell with 423 receiving yards. Phil Forte, Mike Orth, Paul Oswald, Wayne Ziegler, and John Randolph were the team captains.

== Schedule ==
| Date | Opponent | Site | Result | Attendance | Source |
|---|---|---|---|---|---|
| September 13 | North Carolina* | Memorial Stadium; Lawrence, KS | L 0–20 | 40,200 | |
| September 20 | Utah State* | Memorial Stadium; Lawrence, KS | W 16–13 | 36,300 | |
| September 27 | Indiana State* | Memorial Stadium; Lawrence, KS | W 20–6 | 32,400 | |
| October 4 | Southern Illinois* | Memorial Stadium; Lawrence, KS | W 35–23 | 22,500 | |
| October 11 | Iowa State^{†} | Memorial Stadium; Lawrence, KS | L 10–13 | 20,500 | |
| October 18 | at Kansas State | KSU Stadium; Manhattan, KS (rivalry) | L 12–29 | 38,320 | |
| October 25 | at Oklahoma State | Lewis Field; Stillwater, OK | L 6–24 | 46,400 | |
| November 1 | No. 4 Oklahoma | Memorial Stadium; Lawrence, KS | L 3–64 | 38,500 | |
| November 8 | at Colorado | Folsom Field; Boulder, CO | L 10–17 | 37,056 | |
| November 15 | No. 6 Nebraska | Memorial Stadium; Lawrence, KS (rivalry) | L 0–70 | 48,800 | |
| November 22 | at Missouri | Faurot Field; Columbia, MO (Border War) | L 0–48 | 33,553 | |
*Non-conference game; ^{†}Homecoming; Rankings from AP Poll released prior to the game
