= Tony Sands =

American football running back

No. 12
- Position: Running back

Personal information
- Listed height: 5 ft 6 in (1.68 m)
- Listed weight: 175 lb (79 kg)

Career information
- High school: St. Thomas Aquinas (FL)
- College: Kansas (1988–1991)

Awards and highlights
- Second-team All-American (1991); Most rushing attempts in a single game – FBS (58); Big Eight Offensive Player of the Year (1991); First-team All-Big Eight (1991); Second-team All-Big Eight (1989); All-time Big Eight single-season rushing yards leader

Tony Sands is an American former football running back. He played in college at the University of Kansas.

== College career ==
Sands is most notable for holding the all-time Football Bowl Subdivision (FBS) record for the most rushing attempts in a single game, with 58 carries. In the same game, Sands broke the FBS record for most yards in a game with 396, a record that stood for eight years until it was broken by LaDainian Tomlinson in 1999. Both records were originally set by Sands during a game against Missouri on November 23, 1991. Kansas won the game 53–29 with Sands accounting for four touchdowns. He finished his senior season with 1,442 yards and nine touchdowns and was named the Big Eight Offensive Player of the Year.

== Pro career and coaching career ==
Sands had a brief stint (tryout) with the Arizona Cardinals and also briefly coached for Kansas. Many have stated that Sands was likely overlooked for an extended pro career due to his short stature at 5 ft 6 in. Since 1993, Sands has run a speed training program for NFL and college football players.
