= Frank Seurer =

American football player (born 1962)

No. 10
- Position: Quarterback

Personal information
- Born: August 16, 1962 (age 64); Huntington Beach, California, U.S.
- Listed height: 6 ft 1 in (1.85 m)
- Listed weight: 195 lb (88 kg)

Career information
- College: Kansas
- NFL draft: 1984

Career history
- 1984–1985: Los Angeles Express
- 1986–1987: Kansas City Chiefs

Career NFL statistics
- Passing attempts: 55
- Passing completions: 26
- Completion percentage: 47.3%
- TD–INT: 0–4
- Passing yards: 340
- Passer rating: 36.9
- Stats at Pro Football Reference

Frank Anthony Seurer (born August 16, 1962) is an American former professional football player who was a quarterback in the National Football League (NFL).

He played collegiate football at the University of Kansas. He played for the Los Angeles Express (USFL) in 1984 and 1985 seasons. He was selected by the Seattle Seahawks in the 1984 NFL Supplemental Draft of USFL and CFL Players. Seurer started two games at quarterback for the Kansas City Chiefs in the 1987 NFL season following the 1987 NFLPA strike.
