= Ron Warner (gridiron football) =

American football player (born 1975)

No. 98, 99, 95, 94
- Positions: Defensive end, linebacker

Personal information
- Born: September 26, 1975 (age 51); Independence, Kansas, U.S.
- Listed height: 6 ft 3 in (1.91 m)
- Listed weight: 270 lb (122 kg)

Career information
- High school: Independence
- College: Kansas
- NFL draft: 1998: 7th round, 239th overall pick

Career history
- New Orleans Saints (1998); Washington Redskins (1999)*; Chicago Bears (1999)*; Winnipeg Blue Bombers (2000); Tampa Bay Buccaneers (2001–2003); → Barcelona Dragons (2002); Washington Redskins (2003-2004); Winnipeg Blue Bombers (2006); Edmonton Eskimos (2007)
- * Offseason or practice squad member only

Awards and highlights
- Super Bowl champion (XXXVII); First-team All-American (1997); First-team All-Big 12 (1997)

Career NFL statistics
- Sacks: 3.5
- Interceptions: 1
- Stats at Pro Football Reference

Ron Warner (born September 26, 1975) is an American former professional football player who was a defensive end and linebacker in the National Football League (NFL) for the New Orleans Saints, the Tampa Bay Buccaneers, and the Washington Redskins. He was also a member of both the Winnipeg Blue Bombers and Edmonton Eskimos of the Canadian Football League (CFL). He played college football at the Independence Community College for two seasons with the Pirates. During Warner's two seasons with the Pirates, he earned second-team NJCAA All-America honors and was also a First-team All-Jayhawk Conference selection at defensive end. He finished his collegiate career at University of Kansas and was selected in the seventh round of the 1998 NFL draft.
