= Mark Simmons (American football) =

American football player (born 1984)

No. 13
- Position: Wide receiver

Personal information
- Born: January 16, 1984 (age 42); Bloomington, Minnesota, U.S.
- Listed height: 5 ft 10 in (1.78 m)
- Listed weight: 187 lb (85 kg)

Career information
- College: Kansas
- NFL draft: 2006: undrafted

Career history
- San Diego Chargers (2006–2007)*; Houston Texans (2008–2009)
- * Offseason or practice squad member only

Awards and highlights
- Sporting News All-Freshman (2002)

Mark Simmons (born January 16, 1984) is an American former football wide receiver. He was signed by the San Diego Chargers as an undrafted free agent in 2006. He played college football at Kansas.
