= June Henley =

American football player (born 1975)

No. 26
- Position: Running back

Personal information
- Born: September 4, 1975 (age 51); Columbus, Ohio, U.S.
- Listed height: 5 ft 10 in (1.78 m)
- Listed weight: 226 lb (103 kg)

Career information
- High school: Brookhaven (Columbus)
- College: Kansas
- NFL draft: 1997: 5th round, 163rd overall pick

Career history
- Kansas City Chiefs (1997)*; St. Louis Rams (1997–1998)
- * Offseason or practice squad member only

Awards and highlights
- First-team All-Big 8 (1993); Second-team All-Big 8 (1995); Second-team All-Big 12 (1996)

Career NFL statistics
- Rushing yards: 313
- Rushing average: 3.6
- Receptions: 35
- Receiving yards: 252
- Total touchdowns: 3
- Stats at Pro Football Reference

Charles Lee "June" Henley Jr. (born September 4, 1975) is an American former professional football player who was a running back in the National Football League (NFL). After playing college football for the Kansas Jayhawks, he played one season in the NFL for the St. Louis Rams (1998).

== Early life ==
At Brookhaven High School in Columbus, Ohio, Henley played along with Terry Glenn of the New England Patriots, the Green Bay Packers, and the Dallas Cowboys, and Shawn Harris a University of Hawaiʻi standout.

== College career ==
Henley played collegiately at the University of Kansas from 1993 to 1996. He had 3,841 yards and 41 rushing touchdowns in his career at Kansas. He was the school's all-time leading rusher until Devin Neal surpassed his record in 2024.

== Professional career ==
He was selected in the fifth round of the 1997 NFL draft by the Kansas City Chiefs, but was cut. Henley was selected 31 spots ahead of his Kansas teammate Isaac Byrd, also by the Chiefs. He joined the Rams practice squad for a year, before joining the full squad for a year. While with the Rams he appeared in eleven games, where he had 88 carries for 313 yards and 3 touchdowns. The following summer, a toe injury effectively ended his career.

== Legal trouble ==
On November 17, 2005, Henley was arrested in Columbus for participating in a burglary. After pleading guilty to aggravated robbery and aggravated burglary, he was sentenced to four years in prison.

Later on September 26, 2013, Henley was arrested again for theft when he was caught on video surveillance stealing from a Walmart. He has a "lengthy criminal history".
