= 1989 Kansas Jayhawks football team =

American college football season

1989 Kansas Jayhawks football
- Conference: Big Eight Conference
- Record: 4–7 (2–5 Big 8)
- Head coach: Glen Mason (2nd season)
- Offensive coordinator: Pat Ruel (2nd season)
- Home stadium: Memorial Stadium

1989 Big Eight Conference football standings
	Conf.					Overall
Team	W		L		T	W		L		T
No. 4 Colorado $	7	–	0	–	0	11	–	1	–	0
No. 11 Nebraska	6	–	1	–	0	10	–	2	–	0
Oklahoma	5	–	2	–	0	7	–	4	–	0
Iowa State	4	–	3	–	0	6	–	5	–	0
Oklahoma State	3	–	4	–	0	4	–	7	–	0
Kansas	2	–	5	–	0	4	–	7	–	0
Missouri	1	–	6	–	0	2	–	9	–	0
Kansas State	0	–	7	–	0	1	–	10	–	0
$ – Conference champion; Rankings from AP Poll

The 1989 Kansas Jayhawks football team represented the University of Kansas as a member of the Big Eight Conference during the 1989 NCAA Division I-A football season. Led by second-year head coach Glen Mason, the Jayhawks compiled an overall record of 4–7 with a mark of 2–5 in conference play, placing sixth in the Big 8. The team played home games at Memorial Stadium in Lawrence, Kansas.

== Schedule ==
Date	Time	Opponent	Site	TV	Result	Attendance	Source
September 2	1:00 p.m.	Montana State*	Memorial Stadium; Lawrence, KS		W 41–17	37,500	
September 9	1:00 p.m.	Louisville*	Memorial Stadium; Lawrence, KS		L 28–33	32,700	
September 16	1:00 p.m.	Kent State*	Memorial Stadium; Lawrence, KS		W 28–21	41,000	
September 23	6:00 p.m.	at Baylor*	Floyd Casey Stadium; Waco, TX		L 3–46	26,765	
September 30	1:30 p.m.	No. 16 Oklahoma	Memorial Stadium; Lawrence, KS	PSN	L 6–45	44,500	
October 7	1:00 p.m.	Iowa State^{†}	Memorial Stadium; Lawrence, KS		L 20–24	31,500	
October 21	2:30 p.m.	at No. 3 Colorado	Folsom Field; Boulder, CO		L 17–49	50,057	
October 28	1:10 p.m.	at Kansas State	KSU Stadium; Manhattan, KS (rivalry)		W 21–16	35,652	
November 4	1:00 p.m.	Oklahoma State	Memorial Stadium; Lawrence, KS		L 24–37	28,500	
November 11	1:30 p.m.	at No. 6 Nebraska	Memorial Stadium; Lincoln, NE (rivalry)		L 14–51	76,232	
November 18	1:30 p.m.	at Missouri	Faurot Field; Columbia, MO (Border War)		W 46–44	33,981	
*Non-conference game; ^{†}Homecoming; Rankings from AP Poll released prior to the game; All times are in Central time

== Roster ==
1989 Kansas Jayhawks football team roster
Players
Coaches
Offense

Pos.	#	Name	Class
QB	5	Kelly Donohoe	Sr
QB	18	Chip Hilleary
WR	2	Quintin Smith	Sr
WR	6	Jim New
OT	77	Chris Perez	So

Defense

Pos.	#	Name	Class
DT	72	Gilbert Brown	Fr
CB	8	Tim Hill	So
LB	19	Curtis Moore	Jr
S	10	Doug Terry	So

Special teams

Pos.	#	Name	Class

Head coach

- Glen Mason

Coordinators/assistant coaches

Legend

- (C) Team captain
- (S) Suspended
- (I) Ineligible
- Injured
- Redshirt
