= Isaac Byrd =

American football player (born 1974)

No. 83, 82
- Position: Wide receiver

Personal information
- Born: November 16, 1974 (age 51); St. Louis, Missouri, U.S.
- Listed height: 6 ft 1 in (1.85 m)
- Listed weight: 188 lb (85 kg)

Career information
- High school: Parkway Central (Chesterfield, Missouri)
- College: Kansas
- NFL draft: 1997: 6th round, 195th overall pick

Career history
- Kansas City Chiefs (1997)*; Tennessee Oilers/Titans (1997–1999); Carolina Panthers (2000–2002)
- * Offseason or practice squad member only

Awards and highlights
- Second-team All-Big 12 (1996)

Career NFL statistics
- Receptions: 93
- Receiving yards: 1,229
- Receiving touchdowns: 6
- Stats at Pro Football Reference

Isaac Byrd II (born November 16, 1974) is an American former professional football player who was a wide receiver in the National Football League (NFL) for the Tennessee Oilers/Titans and Carolina Panthers. He played college football for the Kansas Jayhawks.

== Biography ==
Isaac grew up in St. Louis. In high school, he played football, basketball and baseball. He won All-Conference, All-Metro and All-State honors in football and baseball. In basketball, he won All-Conference honors. He was also named the Missouri Player of the Year for football. After his senior year, the St. Louis Post Dispatch named Isaac the best athlete to come out of the state of Missouri.

He was heavily sought after by professional baseball teams and was the 24th round draft pick of the San Diego Padres. However, Isaac decided to attend the University of Kansas on a full-ride scholarship to further his career in both football and baseball and to continue his education.

In college, Isaac dominated in both sports. In baseball, he played centerfield and was named Team MVP, 1st Team All-Big 12, 1st Team All-Big 12 Tournament and 2nd Team All-American. After his junior year, he was selected by his hometown team, the St. Louis Cardinals. After a stint in the minor leagues and batting over .300, Isaac returned to college to continue his education and his football career. Playing wide receiver, Isaac was named Team MVP and 2nd Team All-Big 12. He was drafted in the sixth round of the 1997 NFL Draft by the Kansas City Chiefs, 31 spots after his Kansas teammate June Henley, also by the Chiefs. Following the 1997 preseason he was signed to the Chiefs practice squad. He was signed off the Chiefs practice squad by the Tennessee Oilers, later renamed the Titans.

Isaac enjoyed a 6-year career in the NFL playing for the Tennessee Titans and Carolina Panthers. His high point came when he started in Super Bowl XXXIV for the Tennessee Titans against his hometown team, the St. Louis Rams. He finished his career with the Carolina Panthers where he provided solid production. Isaac's older brother, Israel Byrd, played college football at Utah State and professionally for the New Orleans Saints.

After retiring from the NFL, Byrd is a published author of the book; How To: Think Like a Pro, Act Like a Pro & Play Like a Pro. He travels the country as a speaker and radio host.
