= 2004 Kansas Jayhawks football team =

American college football season

2004 Kansas Jayhawks football
- Conference: Big 12 Conference
- North
- Record: 4–7 (2–6 Big 12)
- Head coach: Mark Mangino (3rd season)
- Offensive coordinator: Nick Quartaro (3rd season)
- Defensive coordinator: Bill Young (3rd season)
- Home stadium: Memorial Stadium (Capacity: 50,071)

2004 Big 12 Conference football standings
	Conf.			Overall
Team	W		L	W		L
North Division
Colorado xy	4	–	4	8	–	5
Iowa State x	4	–	4	7	–	5
Nebraska	3	–	5	5	–	6
Missouri	3	–	5	5	–	6
Kansas	2	–	6	4	–	7
Kansas State	2	–	6	4	–	7
South Division
No. 3 Oklahoma xy$	8	–	0	12	–	1
No. 5 Texas %	7	–	1	11	–	1
Texas A&M	5	–	3	7	–	5
No. 18 Texas Tech	5	–	3	8	–	4
Oklahoma State	4	–	4	7	–	5
Baylor	1	–	7	3	–	8
Championship: Oklahoma 42, Colorado 3
$ – BCS representative as conference champion; % – BCS at-large representative; x – Division champion/co-champions; y – Championship game participant; Rankings from AP Poll

The 2004 Kansas Jayhawks football team represented the University of Kansas in the 2004 NCAA Division I-A football season. They were coached by Mark Mangino and played their home games at Memorial Stadium in Lawrence, KS.

== Schedule ==
Date	Time	Opponent	Site	TV	Result	Attendance	Source
September 4	6:00 p.m.	Tulsa*	Memorial Stadium; Lawrence, KS	PPV	W 21–3	40,646	
September 11	6:00 p.m.	Toledo*	Memorial Stadium; Lawrence, KS		W 63–14	41,251	
September 18	1:00 p.m.	at Northwestern*	Ryan Field; Evanston, IL		L 17–20	24,817	
September 25	2:30 p.m.	Texas Tech	Memorial Stadium; Lawrence, KS	FSN	L 30–31	37,422	
September 30	6:00 p.m.	at Nebraska	Memorial Stadium; Lincoln, NE (rivalry)	PPV	L 8–14	77,637	
October 9	6:00 p.m.	Kansas State	Memorial Stadium; Lawrence, KS (Sunflower Showdown)		W 31–28	50,152	
October 23	12:00 p.m.	at No. 2 Oklahoma	Gaylord Family Oklahoma Memorial Stadium; Norman, OK	FSN	L 10–41	84,520	
October 30	1:00 p.m.	at Iowa State	Jack Trice Stadium; Ames, IA		L 7–13	36,384	
November 06	12:30 p.m.	Colorado	Memorial Stadium; Lawrence, KS		L 21–30	38,214	
November 13	11:00 a.m.	No. 6 Texas	Memorial Stadium; Lawrence, KS	FSN	L 23–27	38,714	
November 20	1:00 p.m.	at Missouri	Faurot Field; Columbia, MO (Border War)	FSN	W 31–14	53,480	
*Non-conference game; Rankings from AP Poll released prior to the game; All times are in Central time
