= Dezmon Briscoe =

American football player (born 1989)

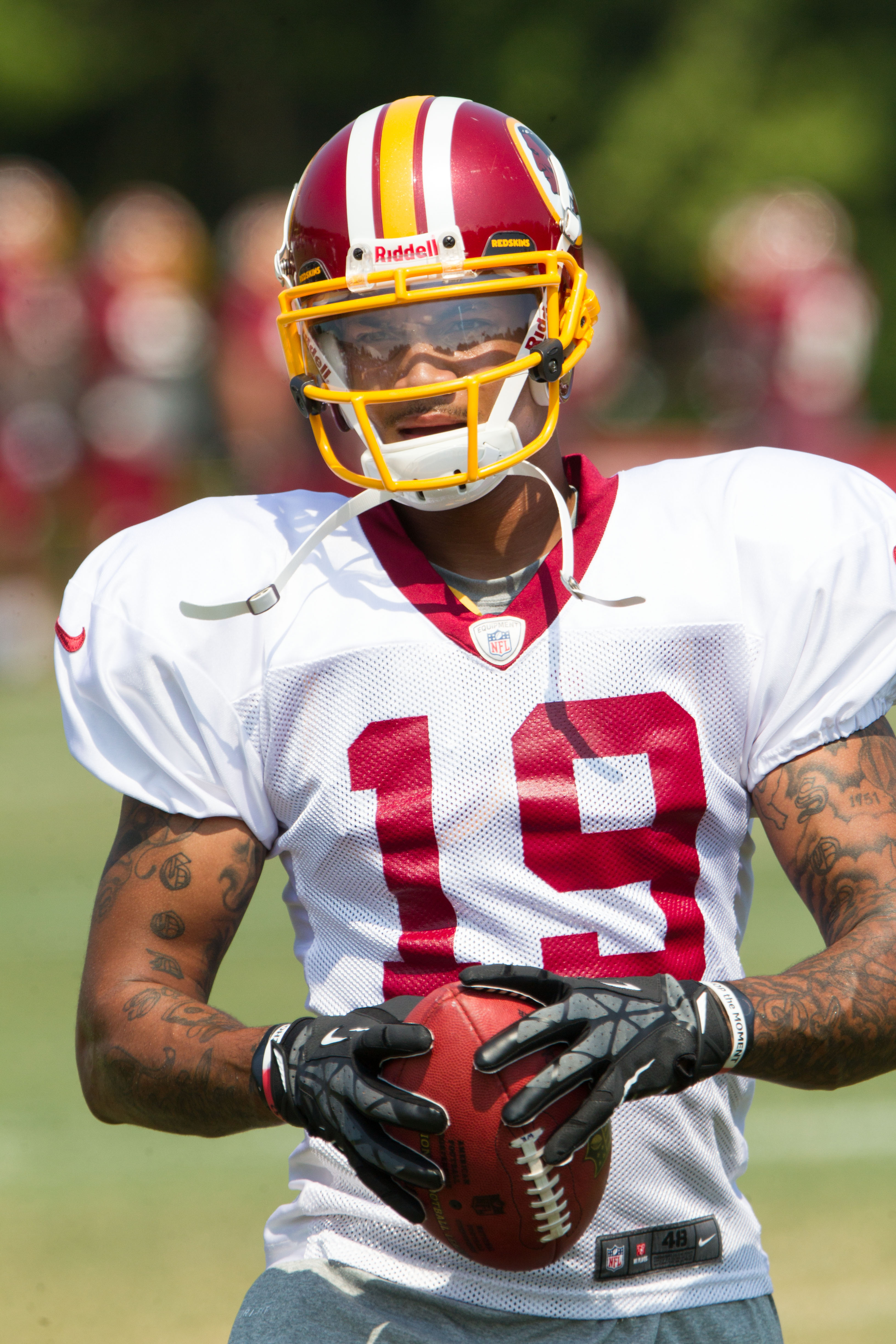
- Briscoe with the Washington Redskins in 2012

No. 19, 89
- Position: Wide receiver

Personal information
- Born: August 31, 1989 (age 37); Dallas, Texas, U.S.
- Listed height: 6 ft 3 in (1.91 m)
- Listed weight: 200 lb (91 kg)

Career information
- High school: Cedar Hill (Cedar Hill, Texas)
- College: Kansas (2007–2009)
- NFL draft: 2010: 6th round, 191st overall pick

Career history
- Cincinnati Bengals (2010)*; Tampa Bay Buccaneers (2010–2011); Washington Redskins (2012–2013); Dallas Cowboys (2014)*
- * Offseason or practice squad member only

Awards and highlights
- Third-team All-American (2009); First-team All-Big 12 (2009); Second-team All-Big 12 (2008); Insight Bowl Offensive MVP (2008)

Career NFL statistics
- Receptions: 43
- Receiving yards: 502
- Receiving touchdowns: 7
- Stats at Pro Football Reference

Dezmon Jerrod Briscoe (born August 31, 1989) is an American former professional football player who was a wide receiver in the National Football League (NFL). He was selected by the Cincinnati Bengals in the sixth round of the 2010 NFL draft. He played college football for the Kansas Jayhawks.

== Early life ==
Briscoe was born in Dallas, Texas. He attended Cedar Hill High School in Cedar Hill, Texas, where he played for the Cedar Hill Longhorns high school football team. He played varsity for two seasons. As a senior in 2006, he recorded 37 receptions for 708 yards and 11 touchdowns as part of a state championship team. This was the very first Cedar Hill state championship team.

Considered a three-star recruit by 247Sports.com, Briscoe was listed as the No. 126 wide receiver in the nation in 2007.

== College career ==
He enrolled at the University of Kansas where he majored in physical education. Briscoe saw action as a true freshman in Kansas in all 13 games including 11 starts. He recorded 43 receptions for 496 yards and seven touchdowns. Briscoe set the school record for a freshman for number of touchdown receptions. The Sporting News named him an honorable mention freshman All-American.

In 2008, he recorded 92 receptions for 1,407 yards and 15 touchdowns. His marks for both receiving yards and touchdowns set new school records. Against Oklahoma, he set a school record for single-game yards with 269 and the most by any individual in the NCAA during the 2008 season. Briscoe also set school records with seven 100-yard games in a season, four consecutive 100-yard games, and 22 career touchdowns. In the regular season finale against Missouri, Briscoe saw his first action as a kickoff returner and recorded seven returns for 195 yards. In the 2008 Insight Bowl against Minnesota, Briscoe caught 14 receptions, which tied the school record for a single game, and returned one kickoff 24 yards. He was named the game's most valuable offensive player. Sports Illustrated named him an honorable mention All-American. Briscoe was also named to the All-Big 12 Conference second-team.

In his junior season, he had 84 receptions for 1,337 yards and 9 touchdowns and was named to the All-Big 12 Conference first-team. After the season, Briscoe chose to enter the NFL draft.

Briscoe ended his three-year college career as the Kansas all-time leader in receiving yards. His career totals are 208 receptions for 3,240 yards and 31 touchdowns.

== Professional career ==
Pre-draft measurables
Height	Weight	Arm length	Hand span	40-yard dash	10-yard split	20-yard split	20-yard shuttle	Three-cone drill	Vertical jump	Broad jump	Bench press
6 ft 2 in (1.88 m)	207 lb (94 kg)	33 1/2 in (0.85 m)	9 1/2 in (0.24 m)	4.66 s	1.60 s	2.68 s	4.57 s	7.10 s	33 in (0.84 m)	9 ft 7 in (2.92 m)	9 reps
All values from NFL Combine

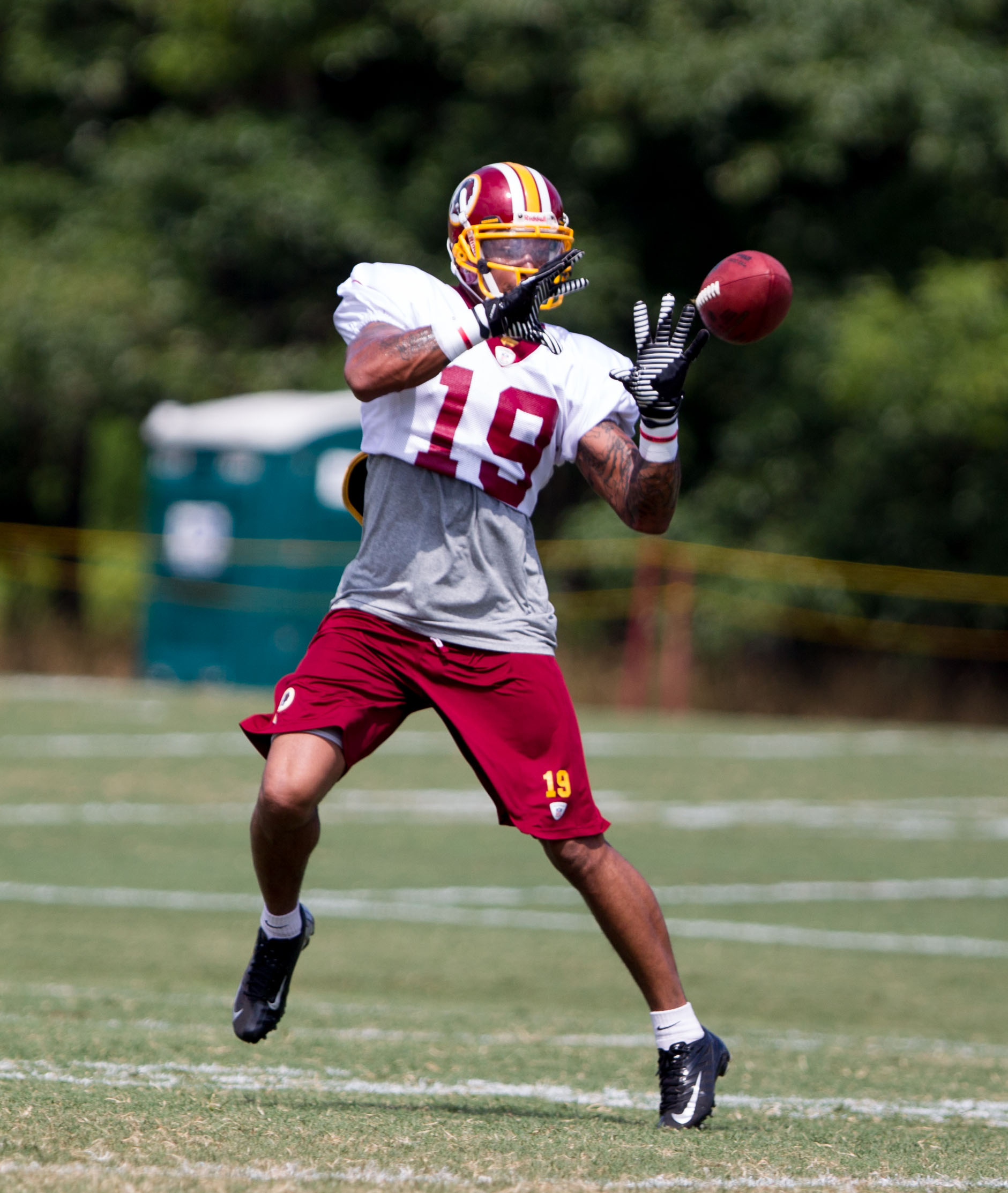
Briscoe catching a pass at Redskins training camp in 2012.

=== Cincinnati Bengals ===
Briscoe was selected by the Cincinnati Bengals in the sixth round with the 191st overall pick in the 2010 NFL draft. He signed a four-year deal with the team on June 25, 2010. Briscoe was then waived on September 4 during final cuts.

=== Tampa Bay Buccaneers ===
On September 5, 2010, Briscoe signed with the Tampa Bay Buccaneers. On November 30, 2010, he was promoted to the active roster from the practice squad. He made his first career touchdown reception in Week 17 of the 2010 season against the New Orleans Saints.

Briscoe played all 16 games, starting two of them, in the 2011 season and recorded 35 receptions for 387 yards and six touchdowns.

He was released on waivers July 26, 2012.

=== Washington Redskins ===
Briscoe was claimed off waivers on July 27, 2012 by the Washington Redskins. On August 31, 2013, the Redskins waived/injured him after he suffered a left shoulder injury in the last 2013 preseason game against the Tampa Bay Buccaneers, Two days later he was placed on the team's injured reserve list.

=== Dallas Cowboys ===
Briscoe was signed by the Dallas Cowboys on July 21, 2014. He was released on August 30 during final roster cuts before the start of the 2014 season.
