= 2006 Kansas Jayhawks football team =

American college football season

2006 Kansas Jayhawks football
- Conference: Big 12 Conference
- North
- Record: 6–6 (3–5 Big 12)
- Head coach: Mark Mangino (5th season)
- Offensive coordinator: Nick Quartaro (5th season)
- Defensive coordinator: Bill Young (5th season)
- Home stadium: Memorial Stadium (Capacity: 50,071)

2006 Big 12 Conference football standings
	Conf.			Overall
Team	W		L	W		L
North Division
Nebraska x	6	–	2	9	–	5
Missouri	4	–	4	8	–	5
Kansas State	4	–	4	7	–	6
Kansas	3	–	5	6	–	6
Colorado	2	–	6	2	–	10
Iowa State	1	–	7	4	–	8
South Division
No. 11 Oklahoma x$	7	–	1	11	–	3
No. 13 Texas	6	–	2	10	–	3
Texas A&M	5	–	3	9	–	4
Texas Tech	4	–	4	8	–	5
Oklahoma State	3	–	5	7	–	6
Baylor	3	–	5	4	–	8
Championship: Oklahoma 21, Nebraska 7
$ – BCS representative as conference champion; x – Division champion/co-champions; Rankings from AP Poll

The 2006 Kansas Jayhawks football team represented the University of Kansas during the 2006 NCAA Division I FBS football season. They participated as members of the Big 12 Conference in the North Division. The team played their home games at Memorial Stadium in Lawrence, Kansas. They were coached by Mark Mangino. Despite winning 6 games, the team was not invited to a bowl game.

== Schedule ==
Date	Time	Opponent	Site	TV	Result	Attendance
September 2	6:00 p.m.	Northwestern State*	Memorial Stadium; Lawrence, KS		W 49–18	44,025
September 9	6:00 p.m.	Louisiana–Monroe*	Memorial Stadium; Lawrence, KS		W 21–19	45,221
September 15	7:00 p.m.	at Toledo*	Glass Bowl; Toledo, OH	ESPN2	L 31–37 ^{2OT}	22,118
September 23	6:00 p.m.	South Florida*	Memorial Stadium; Lawrence, KS	FSN	W 13–7	40,933
September 30	6:00 p.m.	at No. 21 Nebraska	Memorial Stadium; Lincoln, NE (rivalry)	FSN	L 32–39 ^{OT}	85,069
October 7	11:00 a.m.	Texas A&M^{†}	Memorial Stadium; Lawrence, KS	FSN	L 18–21	46,445
October 14	1:00 p.m.	Oklahoma State	Memorial Stadium; Lawrence, KS	FSN	L 32–42	41,203
October 21	2:05 p.m.	at Baylor	Floyd Casey Stadium; Waco, TX		L 35–36	36,125
October 28	1:00 p.m.	Colorado	Memorial Stadium; Lawrence, KS		W 20–15	39,313
November 4	1:00 p.m.	at Iowa State	Jack Trice Stadium; Ames, IA		W 41–10	40,272
November 18	2:30 p.m.	Kansas State	Memorial Stadium; Lawrence, KS (Sunflower Showdown)	FSN	W 39–20	51,821
November 25	11:00 a.m.	at Missouri	Faurot Field; Columbia, MO (rivalry)	ABC	L 17–42	55,614
*Non-conference game; ^{†}Homecoming; Rankings from AP Poll released prior to the game; All times are in Central time
