= James Holt (American football) =

American football player (born 1986)

No. 53
- Position: Linebacker

Personal information
- Born: November 24, 1986 (age 39); Altus, Oklahoma, U.S.
- Listed height: 6 ft 2 in (1.88 m)
- Listed weight: 223 lb (101 kg)

Career information
- High school: Altus
- College: Kansas
- NFL draft: 2009: undrafted

Career history
- San Diego Chargers (2009–2010)

Awards and highlights
- Second-team All-Big 12 (2008)

Career NFL statistics
- Tackles: 10
- Sacks: 0
- Forced fumbles: 0
- INTs: 0
- Stats at Pro Football Reference

James Holt (born November 24, 1986) is an American former professional football player who was a linebacker for the San Diego Chargers of the National Football League (NFL). He played college football for the Kansas Jayhawks and was signed by the Chargers as an undrafted free agent in 2009.
