= Colorado–Kansas State football rivalry =

American college sports rivalry

- Teams: Colorado Buffaloes; Kansas State Wildcats
- First meeting: November 16, 1912; Kansas State 14, Colorado 6
- Latest meeting: October 31, 2026; Colorado 27, Kansas State 24^{OT}
- Next meeting: TBD

Statistics
- Total meetings: 69
- All-time series: Colorado leads, 46–22–1
- Largest victory: Colorado: 64–3 (1990); Kansas State: 38–6 (1984)
- Longest win streak: Colorado: 10 (1954–1963)
- Current win streak: Colorado: 1 (2026–present)

Locations of Colorado and Kansas State

The Colorado–Kansas State football rivalry is an American college football rivalry between the University of Colorado Buffaloes and Kansas State University Wildcats. The rivalry dates from their first college football game in 1912, and has continued across all sports, including basketball since their time in the Big Eight Conference joining in 1947. The rivalry intensified while the two schools were conference foes and members of the Big 12 Conference from 1996 to 2010. The rivalry was renewed in 2016 and was slated for a home-and-home series in 2027 and 2028. On July 1, 2024, Colorado rejoined the Big 12, rekindling the rivalry. The teams met again at Folsom Stadium on October 12, 2024.

== Series history ==
Colorado leads the series 46–22–1. As former Big 8 and Big 12 rivals, the teams played annually against each other in all sports from 1948 to 2010.

In 2016, Colorado announced a renewed rivalry series between Kansas State in a home-and-home series in 2027 and 2028. Following Colorado's announcement that it would rejoin the Big 12 starting in 2024, the two will likely play as regular conference opponents, earlier than the series that was previously scheduled. On November 1, 2023, the Big 12 announced the opponents for the 2024 through 2027 seasons. Colorado and Kansas State met in 2024, 2025, and 2026.

== Game results ==
Colorado victories	Kansas State victories	Tie games

No.	Date	Location	Winner	Score
1	November 16, 1912	Manhattan	Kansas State	14–6
2	October 14, 1939	Manhattan	Kansas State	20–0
3	October 5, 1940	Boulder	Colorado	7–6
4	October 23, 1948	Boulder	Colorado	51–7
5	October 1, 1949	Manhattan	Kansas State	27–13
6	September 30, 1950	Boulder	Colorado	34–6
7	October 20, 1951	Manhattan	Colorado	20–7
8	November 15, 1952	Boulder	Colorado	34–14
9	October 17, 1953	Manhattan	Kansas State	28–14
10	November 20, 1954	Boulder	Colorado	38–14
11	October 15, 1955	Manhattan	Colorado	34–13
12	September 29, 1956	Boulder	Colorado	34–0
13	October 19, 1957	Manhattan	Colorado	42–14
14	September 27, 1958	Boulder	Colorado	13–3
15	October 10, 1959	Manhattan	Colorado	20–17
16	October 1, 1960	Boulder	Colorado	27–7
17	October 21, 1961	Manhattan	Colorado	13–0
18	September 29, 1962	Boulder	Colorado	6–0
19	October 5, 1963	Manhattan	Colorado	21–7
20	October 3, 1964	Boulder	Kansas State	16–14
21	October 2, 1965	Manhattan	Colorado	36–0
22	October 1, 1966	Boulder	Colorado	10–0
23	November 18, 1967	Manhattan	Colorado	40–6
24	October 19, 1968	Boulder	Colorado	37–14
25	November 22, 1969	Boulder	Colorado	45–32
26	October 3, 1970	Manhattan	Kansas State	21–20
27	October 2, 1971	Boulder	#6 Colorado	31–21
28	October 7, 1972	Manhattan	#12 Colorado	38–17
29	November 24, 1973	Boulder	Kansas State	17–14
30	November 23, 1974	Manhattan	Kansas State	33–19
31	November 22, 1975	Boulder	#9 Colorado	33–7
32	November 20, 1976	Manhattan	#15 Colorado	35–28
33	November 19, 1977	Boulder	Colorado	23–0
34	November 11, 1978	Manhattan	Kansas State	20–10
35	November 24, 1979	Boulder	Colorado	21–6

No.	Date	Location	Winner	Score
36	November 22, 1980	Manhattan	Kansas State	17–14
37	November 21, 1981	Boulder	Colorado	24–21
38	November 20, 1982	Manhattan	Kansas State	33–10
39	November 19, 1983	Boulder	Colorado	38–21
40	November 17, 1984	Manhattan	Kansas State	38–6
41	November 23, 1985	Boulder	Colorado	30–0
42	November 22, 1986	Manhattan	Colorado	49–3
43	November 21, 1987	Manhattan	Colorado	41–0
44	November 19, 1988	Boulder	Colorado	56–14
45	November 18, 1989	Manhattan	#2 Colorado	59–11
46	November 17, 1990	Boulder	#2 Colorado	64–3
47	October 26, 1991	Manhattan	#16 Colorado	10–0
48	October 24, 1992	Boulder	#9 Colorado	54–7
49	October 23, 1993	Manhattan	Tie	16–16
50	October 22, 1994	Boulder	#2 Colorado	35–21
51	November 18, 1995	Manhattan	#9 Colorado	27–17
52	November 16, 1996	Boulder	#6 Colorado	12–0
53	November 15, 1997	Manhattan	#10 Kansas State	37–20
54	October 10, 1998	Boulder	#5 Kansas State	16–9
55	November 6, 1999	Manhattan	#6 Kansas State	20–14
56	September 30, 2000	Boulder	#5 Kansas State	44–21
57	October 6, 2001	Manhattan	Colorado	16–6
58	October 5, 2002	Boulder	Colorado	35–31
59	October 18, 2003	Manhattan	Kansas State	49–20
60	November 13, 2004	Boulder	Colorado	38–31
61	October 29, 2005	Manhattan	Colorado	23–20
62	November 4, 2006	Boulder	Kansas State	34–21
63	October 13, 2007	Manhattan	Kansas State	47–20
64	October 18, 2008	Boulder	Colorado	14–13
65	October 24, 2009	Manhattan	Kansas State	20–6
66	November 20, 2010	Boulder	Colorado	44–36
67	October 12, 2024	Boulder	#18 Kansas State	31–28
68	November 29, 2025	Manhattan	Kansas State	24–14
69	October 31, 2026	Boulder	Colorado	27–24^{OT}
Series: Colorado leads 46–22–1

== See also ==
- List of NCAA college football rivalry games
