= 1988 Oklahoma Sooners football team =

American college football season

1988 Oklahoma Sooners football

Florida Citrus Bowl, L 6–13 vs. Clemson
- Conference: Big Eight Conference

Ranking
- Coaches: No. 14
- AP: No. 14
- Record: 9–3 (6–1 Big 8)
- Head coach: Barry Switzer (16th season)
- Offensive coordinator: Jim Donnan (4th season)
- Offensive scheme: Wishbone
- Defensive coordinator: Gary Gibbs (8th season)
- Base defense: 5–2
- Captains: Scott Garl; Jamelle Holieway; Anthony Phillips; Anthony Stafford
- Home stadium: Oklahoma Memorial Stadium

1988 Big Eight Conference football standings
	Conf.					Overall
Team	W		L		T	W		L		T
No. 10 Nebraska $	7	–	0	–	0	11	–	2	–	0
No. 14 Oklahoma	6	–	1	–	0	9	–	3	–	0
No. 11 Oklahoma State	5	–	2	–	0	10	–	2	–	0
Colorado	4	–	3	–	0	8	–	4	–	0
Iowa State	3	–	4	–	0	5	–	6	–	0
Missouri	2	–	5	–	0	3	–	7	–	1
Kansas	1	–	6	–	0	1	–	10	–	0
Kansas State	0	–	7	–	0	0	–	11	–	0
$ – Conference champion; Rankings from AP Poll

The 1988 Oklahoma Sooners football team represented the University of Oklahoma during the 1988 NCAA Division I-A football season. They played their home games at Oklahoma Memorial Stadium and competed as members of the Big Eight Conference. The Sooners were led by Barry Switzer in his sixteenth and final season as head coach.

== Schedule ==
Date	Time	Opponent	Rank	Site	TV	Result	Attendance	Source
September 10	4:00 p.m.	at North Carolina*	No. 4	Kenan Memorial Stadium; Chapel Hill, NC	ESPN	W 28–0	53,675	
September 17	1:30 p.m.	Arizona*	No. 4	Oklahoma Memorial Stadium; Norman, OK		W 28–10	75,004	
September 24	2:30 p.m.	at No. 5 USC*	No. 3	Los Angeles Memorial Coliseum; Los Angeles, CA	ABC	L 7–23	86,124	
October 1	1:30 p.m.	Iowa State	No. 10	Oklahoma Memorial Stadium; Norman, OK		W 35–7	75,004	
October 8	1:30 p.m.	vs. Texas*	No. 10	Cotton Bowl; Dallas, TX (Red River Shootout)	CBS	W 28–13	75,587	
October 15	1:30 p.m.	Kansas State	No. 9	Oklahoma Memorial Stadium; Norman, OK		W 70–24	73,800	
October 22	7:00 p.m.	at Colorado	No. 8	Folsom Field; Boulder, CO	ESPN	W 17–14	49,716	
October 29	1:30 p.m.	Kansas	No. 8	Oklahoma Memorial Stadium; Norman, OK	PPV	W 63–14	74,004	
November 5	3:30 p.m.	at No. 12 Oklahoma State	No. 8	Lewis Field; Stillwater, OK (Bedlam Series)	ESPN	W 31–28	50,440	
November 12	1:30 p.m.	at Missouri	No. 8	Faurot Field; Columbia, MO (rivalry)	PPV	W 16–7	40,704	
November 19	2:30 p.m.	No. 7 Nebraska	No. 9	Oklahoma Memorial Stadium; Norman, OK (rivalry)	CBS	L 3–7	75,004	
January 2, 1989	12:30 p.m.	vs. No. 13 Clemson*	No. 10	Florida Citrus Bowl; Orlando, FL (Florida Citrus Bowl)	ABC	L 6–13	53,571	
*Non-conference game; Rankings from AP Poll released prior to the game; All times are in Central time

== Rankings ==
Ranking movements Legend: ██ Increase in ranking ██ Decrease in ranking ( ) = First-place votes
	Week																
Poll	Pre	1	2	3	4	5	6	7	8	9	10	11	12	13	14	15	Final
AP	3 (2)	3 (1)	4 (1)	3 (1)	3 (3)	10	10	9	8	8	8	8	9	10	10	10	14
Coaches Poll	2 (4)	2 (4)	4	3	3	10	10	9	8	8	7	8	8	11	10	10	14

== Game summaries ==
=== At North Carolina ===
#4 Oklahoma Sooners (0–0) at North Carolina Tar Heels (0–1)

Quarter	1	2	3	4	Total
Oklahoma	14	7	7	0	28
North Carolina	0	0	0	0	0

at Kenan Memorial Stadium, Chapel Hill, North Carolina

- Date: September 10, 1988
- Game attendance: 53,675
- TV announcers (ESPN): Chris Fowler

External videos
- Game highlights

Team	Category	Player	Statistics
Oklahoma	Passing	Jamelle Holieway	2/3, 61 Yds
Oklahoma	Rushing	Anthony Stafford	12 Rush, 88 Yds, TD
Oklahoma	Receiving	Eric Bross	3 Rec, 72 Yds
North Carolina	Passing	Deems May	9/19, 87 Yds, INT
North Carolina	Rushing	Jonathan Hall	10 Rush, 44 Yds
North Carolina	Receiving	Randy Marriott	4 Rec, 64 Yds

Scoring summary

Quarter	Time	Drive			Team	Scoring information	Score	
Quarter	Time	Plays	Yards	TOP	Team	Scoring information	OU	UNC
1					Oklahoma	Leon Perry 2-yard touchdown run, R.D. Lashar kick good	7	0
1					Oklahoma	Charles Thompson 8-yard touchdown run, R.D. Lashar kick good	14	0
2					Oklahoma	Anthony Stafford 1-yard touchdown run, R.D. Lashar kick good	21	0
3					Oklahoma	Jamelle Holieway 4-yard touchdown run, R.D. Lashar kick good	28	0
"TOP" = time of possession. For other American football terms, see Glossary of American football.							28	0

=== Arizona ===
Arizona Wildcats (1–0) at #4 Oklahoma Sooners (1–0)

Quarter	1	2	3	4	Total
Arizona	3	0	7	0	10
Oklahoma	7	7	7	7	28

at Oklahoma Memorial Stadium, Norman, Oklahoma

- Date: September 17, 1988
- Game attendance: 75,004

Game information

First quarter

- UA – Doug Pfaff 38-yard field goal. Arizona 3–0.
- OU – Leon Perry 1-yard run (R.D. Lashar kick). Oklahoma 7–3.

Second quarter

- OU – Jamelle Holieway 5-yard run (R.D. Lashar kick). Oklahoma 14–3.

Third quarter

- UA – Mario Hampton 9-yard run (Doug Pfaff kick). Oklahoma 14–10.
- OU – Eric Bross 43-yard pass from Jamelle Holieway (R.D. Lashar kick). Oklahoma 21–10.

Fourth quarter

- OU – Anthony Stafford 5-yard run (R.D. Lashar kick). Oklahoma 28–10.

Top passers

- UA – Bobby Watters – 11/25, 124 yards, 2 INT
- OU – Jamelle Holieway – 3/7, 73 yards, TD

Top rushers

- UA – Reggie McGill – 2 rushes, 50 yards
- OU – Jamelle Holieway – 17 rushes, 75 yards, TD

Top receivers

- UA – Art Greathouse – 4 receptions, 30 yards
- OU – Eric Bross – 1 reception, 43 yards, TD

=== At USC ===
#3 Oklahoma Sooners (2–0) at #5 USC Trojans (2–0)

Quarter	1	2	3	4	Total
Oklahoma	0	0	7	0	7
USC	7	13	0	3	23

at Los Angeles Memorial Coliseum, Los Angeles, California

- Date: September 24, 1988
- Game attendance: 86,124
- TV announcers (ABC): Keith Jackson and Bob Griese

Game information

First quarter

- USC – Aaron Emanuel 5-yard run (Quin Rodriguez kick). USC 7–0.

Second quarter

- USC – Quin Rodriguez 33-yard field goal. USC 10–0.
- USC – Aaron Emanuel 6-yard run (Quin Rodriguez kick). USC 17–0.
- USC – Quin Rodriguez 23-yard field goal. USC 20–0.

Third quarter

- OU – Leon Perry 2-yard run (R.D. Lashar kick). USC 20–7. Drive: 4 plays, 80 yards.

Fourth quarter

- USC – Quin Rodriguez 25-yard field goal. USC 23–7.

Top passers

- OU – Jamelle Holieway – 4/9, 96 yards, INT
- USC – Rodney Peete – 16/34, 198 yards, INT

Top rushers

- OU – Anthony Stafford – 9 rushes, 28 yards
- USC – Aaron Emanuel – 10 rushes, 46 yards, 2 TD

Top receivers

- OU – Eric Bross – 4 receptions, 84 yards
- USC – Erik Affholter – 8 receptions, 94 yards

External videos
- Full game
- Game highlights

=== Iowa State ===
Iowa State Cyclones (1–2) at #10 Oklahoma Sooners (2–1)

Quarter	1	2	3	4	Total
Iowa St	0	7	0	0	7
Oklahoma	14	7	14	0	35

at Oklahoma Memorial Stadium, Norman, Oklahoma

- Date: October 1, 1988
- Game attendance: 75,004

Game information

First quarter

- OU – Anthony Stafford 10-yard run (pass failed). Oklahoma 6–0.
- OU – Rotnei Anderson 5-yard run (run good). Oklahoma 14–0.

Second quarter

- ISU – Mike Busch 2-yard pass from Brent Oberg (Jeff Shudak kick). Oklahoma 14–7.
- OU – Carl Cabbiness 12-yard pass from Jamelle Holieway (R.D. Lashar kick). Oklahoma 21–7.

Third quarter

- OU – Eric Bross 13-yard pass from Jamelle Holieway (R.D. Lashar kick). Oklahoma 28–7.
- OU – Leon Perry 25-yard run (R.D. Lashar kick). Oklahoma 35–7.

Fourth quarter

- No scoring

Top passers

- ISU – Brent Oberg – 10/17, 68 yards, TD
- OU – Jamelle Holieway – 5/5, 113 yards, 2 TD

Top rushers

- ISU – Joe Henderson – 26 rushes, 75 yards
- OU – Charles Thompson – 9 rushes, 85 yards

Top receivers

- ISU – Eddie Brown – 2 receptions, 43 yards
- OU – Eric Bross – 2 receptions, 43 yards, TD

=== Vs. Texas ===
#10 Oklahoma Sooners (3–1) vs. Texas Longhorns (3–1)

Quarter	1	2	3	4	Total
Texas	0	0	7	6	13
Oklahoma	6	8	7	7	28

at Cotton Bowl, Dallas, Texas

- Date: October 8, 1988
- Game time: 1:45 p.m.
- Game weather: Light rain, 57 °F (14 °C)
- Game attendance: 75,587
- Referee: Sam Maphis
- Box Score, Box Score

Jamelle Holieway left in first quarter with sprained right ankle following Oklahoma's first score.

Texas is just horrible.

— Kert Kasper, pregame

Team	Category	Player	Statistics
Texas	Passing	Shannon Kelley	22/35, 198 Yds, TD, 3 INT
Texas	Rushing	Eric Metcalf	15 Rush, 89 Yds
Texas	Receiving	Kerry Cash	2 Rec, 99 Yds
Oklahoma	Passing		
Oklahoma	Rushing	Leon Perry	18 Rush, 118 Yds, TD
Oklahoma	Receiving		

Scoring summary

Quarter	Time	Drive			Team	Scoring information	Score	
Quarter	Time	Plays	Yards	TOP	Team	Scoring information	UT	OU
1	2:06				Oklahoma	Leon Perry 2-yard touchdown run, R.D. Lashar kick no good (blocked)	0	6
2	10:28	2	92		Oklahoma	Anthony Stafford 86-yard touchdown run, 2-point run good	0	14
3	9:17	11	70		Texas	Eric Metcalf 4-yard touchdown reception from Shannon Kelley, Wayne Clements kick good	7	14
3	6:24				Oklahoma	Interception returned 26 yards for touchdown by Kert Kasper, R.D. Lashar kick good	7	21
4	14:47				Texas	48-yard field goal by Wayne Clements	10	21
4	9:52				Texas	34-yard field goal by Wayne Clements	13	21
4	6:53		81		Oklahoma	Charles Thompson 8-yard touchdown run, R.D. Lashar kick good	13	28
"TOP" = time of possession. For other American football terms, see Glossary of American football.							13	28

=== Kansas State ===
Kansas State Wildcats (0–5) at #9 Oklahoma Sooners (6–1)

Quarter	1	2	3	4	Total
Kansas St	0	0	7	17	24
Oklahoma	35	14	7	14	70

at Oklahoma Memorial Stadium, Norman, Oklahoma

- Date: October 15, 1988
- Game attendance: 75,004
- Box Score

Oklahoma set single game NCAA rushing record (768)

External videos
- Game highlights (Oklahoma Football Show)

Team	Category	Player	Statistics
Kansas St	Passing	Carl Straw	27/42, 336 Yds, 3 TD, 2 INT
Kansas St	Rushing	Tom Dillon	6 Rush, 57 Yds
Kansas St	Receiving	Greg Washington	8 Rec, 146 Yds, 2 TD
Oklahoma	Passing	Jamelle Holieway	5/9, 58 Yds, TD, INT
Oklahoma	Rushing	Eric Mitchel	6 Rush, 161 Yds, 2 TD
Oklahoma	Receiving	Leon Perry	2 Rec, 33 Yds, TD

Scoring summary

Quarter	Time	Drive			Team	Scoring information	Score	
Quarter	Time	Plays	Yards	TOP	Team	Scoring information	KSU	OU
1					Oklahoma	Charles Thompson 11-yard touchdown run, R.D. Lashar kick good	0	7
1					Oklahoma	Charles Thompson 5-yard touchdown run, R.D. Lashar kick good	0	14
1					Oklahoma	Adrian Cooper 3-yard touchdown reception from Charles Thompson, R.D. Lashar kick good	0	21
1					Oklahoma	Mike Gaddis 53-yard touchdown run, R.D. Lashar kick good	0	28
1					Oklahoma	Charles Thompson 77-yard touchdown run, R.D. Lashar kick good	0	35
2					Oklahoma	Leon Perry 16-yard touchdown reception from Jamelle Holieway, R.D. Lashar kick good	0	42
2					Oklahoma	Rotnei Anderson 1-yard touchdown run, R.D. Lashar kick good	0	49
3					Kansas St	Greg Washington 6-yard touchdown reception from Carl Straw, Mark Porter kick good	7	49
3					Oklahoma	Eric Mitchel 85-yard touchdown run, R.D. Lashar kick good	7	56
4					Kansas St	Greg Washington 89-yard touchdown reception from Carl Straw, Mark Porter kick good	14	56
4					Oklahoma	Eric Mitchel 47-yard touchdown run, R.D. Lashar kick good	14	63
4					Kansas St	53-yard field goal by Mark Porter	17	63
4					Kansas St	Frank Hernandez 9-yard touchdown reception from Carl Straw, Mark Porter kick good	24	63
4					Oklahoma	Muti 34-yard touchdown run, R.D. Lashar kick good	24	70
"TOP" = time of possession. For other American football terms, see Glossary of American football.							24	70

=== At Colorado ===
#8 Oklahoma Sooners (5–1) at Colorado Buffaloes (5–1)

Quarter	1	2	3	4	Total
Oklahoma	7	7	0	3	17
Colorado	6	8	0	0	14

at Folsom Field, Boulder, Colorado

- Date: October 22, 1989
- Game time: 8:00 p.m. EDT
- Game attendance: 49,716
- TV announcers (ESPN): Chris Fowler

External videos
- Full game

Scoring summary

Quarter	Time	Drive			Team	Scoring information	Score	
Quarter	Time	Plays	Yards	TOP	Team	Scoring information	OU	CU
1					Oklahoma	Charles Thompson 11-yard touchdown run, R.D. Lashar kick good	7	0
1					Colorado	35-yard field goal by Ken Culbertson	7	3
1					Colorado	26-yard field goal by Ken Culbertson	7	6
2					Colorado	Eric Bieniemy 24-yard touchdown run, 2-point pass good	7	14
2					Oklahoma	Anthony Stafford 2-yard touchdown run, R.D. Lashar kick good	14	14
4	8:15	14	71		Oklahoma	22-yard field goal by R.D. Lashar	17	14
"TOP" = time of possession. For other American football terms, see Glossary of American football.							17	14

=== Kansas ===
Kansas Jayhawks (0–7) at #8 Oklahoma Sooners (6–1)

Quarter	1	2	3	4	Total
Kansas	14	0	0	0	14
Oklahoma	14	7	14	28	63

at Oklahoma Memorial Stadium, Norman, Oklahoma

- Date: October 29, 1988
- Game attendance: 74,004

Jamelle Holieway set school record for career total yardage.

Team	Category	Player	Statistics
Kansas	Passing	Kelly Donohoe	13/24, 260 Yds, TD, 3 INT
Kansas	Rushing	Tony Sands	8 Rush, 34 Yds
Kansas	Receiving	Willie Vaughn	5 Rec, 161 Yds, TD
Oklahoma	Passing	Jamelle Holieway	7/7, 104 Yds, TD
Oklahoma	Rushing	Charles Thompson	14 Rush, 118 Yds, 2 TD
Oklahoma	Receiving	Artie Guess	3 Rec, 49 Yds, TD

Scoring summary

Quarter	Time	Drive			Team	Scoring information	Score	
Quarter	Time	Plays	Yards	TOP	Team	Scoring information	KU	OU
1					Oklahoma	Damon Stell 9-yard touchdown run, R.D. Lashar kick good	0	7
1		9	80		Kansas	Roger Robben 1-yard touchdown run, Brad Fleeman kick good	7	7
1		10	61		Oklahoma	Charles Thompson 1-yard touchdown run, R.D. Lashar kick good	7	14
1		1	80		Kansas	Willie Vaughn 80-yard touchdown reception from Kelly Donohoe, Brad Fleeman kick good	14	14
2					Oklahoma	Charles Thompson 1-yard touchdown run, R.D. Lashar kick good	14	21
3					Oklahoma	Eric Mitchel 24-yard touchdown run, R.D. Lashar kick good	14	28
3					Oklahoma	Jamelle Holieway 1-yard touchdown run, R.D. Lashar kick good	14	35
4					Oklahoma	Interception returned 80 yards for touchdown by Scott Garl, R.D. Lashar kick good	14	42
4					Oklahoma	Fumble recovery in end zone by Glyn Milburn, R.D. Lashar kick good	14	49
4					Oklahoma	Artie Guess 21-yard touchdown reception from Jamelle Holieway, R.D. Lashar kick good	14	56
4					Oklahoma	Glen Bell 1-yard touchdown run, R.D. Lashar kick good	14	63
"TOP" = time of possession. For other American football terms, see Glossary of American football.							14	63

=== At Oklahoma State ===
#8 Oklahoma Sooners (7–1) at #12 Oklahoma State Cowboys (8–1)

Quarter	1	2	3	4	Total
Oklahoma	21	3	0	7	31
Oklahoma St	7	7	0	14	28

at Lewis Field, Stillwater, Oklahoma

- Date: November 5, 1988
- Game weather: Partly cloudy, 58 °F (14 °C)
- Game attendance: 50,440
- TV announcers (ESPN): Roger Twibell and Lee Corso

Oklahoma State's Brent Parker dropped a potential game-winning touchdown pass in the end zone with 43 seconds left.

External videos
- Full game
- Game highlights

Team	Category	Player	Statistics
Oklahoma	Passing	Charles Thompson	2/5, 24 Yds
Oklahoma	Rushing	Mike Gaddis	18 Rush, 213 Yds, 2 TD
Oklahoma	Receiving	Leon Perry	1 Rec, 17 Yds
Oklahoma St	Passing	Mike Gundy	18/28, 228 Yds, TD, 3 INT
Oklahoma St	Rushing	Barry Sanders	39 Rush, 215 Yds, 2 TD
Oklahoma St	Receiving	Hart Lee Dykes	9 Rec, 122 Yds, TD

Scoring summary

Quarter	Time	Drive			Team	Scoring information	Score	
Quarter	Time	Plays	Yards	TOP	Team	Scoring information	OU	OSU
1					Oklahoma	Mike Gaddis 13-yard touchdown run, R.D. Lashar kick good	7	0
1		1	44	0:07	Oklahoma	Mike Gaddis 44-yard touchdown run, R.D. Lashar kick good	14	0
1	6:52				Oklahoma St	Mike Gundy 4-yard touchdown run, Cary Blanchard kick good	14	7
1		11	80	4:17	Oklahoma	Leon Perry 7-yard touchdown run, R.D. Lashar kick good	21	7
2		8	89	3:48	Oklahoma St	Hart Lee Dykes 2-yard touchdown reception from Mike Gundy, Cary Blanchard kick good	21	14
2	2:08				Oklahoma	27-yard field goal by R.D. Lashar	24	14
4	13:37				Oklahoma St	Barry Sanders 1-yard touchdown run, Cary Blanchard kick good	24	21
4	8:45	8	72	3:12	Oklahoma St	Barry Sanders 1-yard touchdown run, Cary Blanchard kick good	24	28
4	2:33	13	80	6:12	Oklahoma	Charles Thompson 18-yard touchdown run, R.D. Lashar kick good	31	28
"TOP" = time of possession. For other American football terms, see Glossary of American football.							31	28

=== At Missouri ===
#8 Oklahoma Sooners (8–1) at Missouri Tigers (2–6–1)

Quarter	1	2	3	4	Total
Oklahoma	10	6	0	0	16
Missouri	0	0	7	0	7

at Faurot Field, Columbia, Missouri

- Date: November 12, 1988
- Game attendance: 40,704
- Box Score

Oklahoma's 30th straight conference victory

Team	Category	Player	Statistics
Oklahoma	Passing	Charles Thompson	1/4, 8 Yds, TD
Oklahoma	Rushing	Charles Thompson	26 Rush, 118 Yds
Oklahoma	Receiving	Eric Bross	1 Rec, 8 Yds, TD
Missouri	Passing	Brad Fitzmaurice	11/23, 160 Yds, TD, INT
Missouri	Rushing	Tommie Stowers	20 Rush, 83 Yds
Missouri	Receiving	Craig Lammers	6 Rec, 75 Yds, TD

Scoring summary

Quarter	Time	Drive			Team	Scoring information	Score	
Quarter	Time	Plays	Yards	TOP	Team	Scoring information	OU	MU
1					Oklahoma	Eric Bross 8-yard touchdown reception from Charles Thompson, R.D. Lashar kick good	7	0
1					Oklahoma	25-yard field goal by R.D. Lashar	10	0
2					Oklahoma	Anthony Stafford 1-yard touchdown run, R.D. Lashar kick no good (blocked)	16	0
4					Missouri	Craig Lammers 12-yard touchdown reception from Brad Fitzmaurice, Jeff Jacke kick good	16	7
"TOP" = time of possession. For other American football terms, see Glossary of American football.							16	7

=== Nebraska ===
#7 Nebraska Cornhuskers (10–1) at #9 Oklahoma Sooners (9–1)

Quarter	1	2	3	4	Total
Nebraska	7	0	0	0	7
Oklahoma	0	0	3	0	3

at Oklahoma Memorial Stadium, Norman, Oklahoma

- Date: November 19, 1988
- Game time: 3:30 p.m. EDT
- Game weather: Rain
- Game attendance: 75,004
- TV announcers (CBS): Brent Musburger
- Box Score, Box Score

Charles Thompson broke his leg on Oklahoma's final offensive play of the game.

External videos
- Full game
- Game highlights

Team	Category	Player	Statistics
Nebraska	Passing	Steve Taylor	2/12, 48 Yds, INT
Nebraska	Rushing	Ken Clark	24 Rush, 167 Yds
Nebraska	Receiving	Richard Bell	2 Rec, 48 Yds
Oklahoma	Passing	Charles Thompson	3/9, 39 Yds, INT
Oklahoma	Rushing	Mike Gaddis	12 Rush, 45 Yds
Oklahoma	Receiving	Artie Guess	1 Rec, 28 Yds

Scoring summary

Quarter	Time	Drive			Team	Scoring information	Score	
Quarter	Time	Plays	Yards	TOP	Team	Scoring information	NU	OU
1	11:06	9	80		Nebraska	Steve Taylor 1-yard touchdown run, Gregg Berrios kick good	7	0
3	1:50	6	19		Oklahoma	29-yard field goal by R.D. Lashar	7	3
"TOP" = time of possession. For other American football terms, see Glossary of American football.							7	3

=== Florida Citrus Bowl (vs. Clemson) ===
Florida Citrus Bowl: #13 Clemson Tigers (9–2) vs. #10 Oklahoma Sooners (9–2)

Quarter	1	2	3	4	Total
Clemson	0	6	0	7	13
Oklahoma	3	0	3	0	6

at Florida Citrus Bowl, Orlando, Florida

- Date: January 2, 1989
- Game weather: Sunny, 73 °F (23 °C)
- Game attendance: 53,571
- Referee: Dick Burleson
- Box Score

Jamelle Holieway made the start in his final collegiate game.

External videos
- Full game
- Game highlights

Team	Category	Player	Statistics
Clemson	Passing	Rodney Williams	5/11
Clemson	Rushing	Terry Allen	53 Yds, TD
Clemson	Receiving	Terry Allen	4 Rec, 47 Yds
Oklahoma	Passing		
Oklahoma	Rushing	Mike Gaddis	12 Rush, 37 YDs
Oklahoma	Receiving		

Scoring summary

Quarter	Time	Drive			Team	Scoring information	Score	
Quarter	Time	Plays	Yards	TOP	Team	Scoring information	CLEM	OU
1		11	25	5:06	Oklahoma	35-yard field goal by R.D. Lashar	0	3
2		10	49	5:05	Clemson	20-yard field goal by Chris Gardocki	3	3
2					Clemson	46-yard field goal by Chris Gardocki	6	3
3	2:17				Oklahoma	30-yard field goal by R.D. Lashar	6	6
4	10:28	15	80	6:49	Clemson	Terry Allen 4-yard touchdown run, Chris Gardocki kick good	13	6
"TOP" = time of possession. For other American football terms, see Glossary of American football.							13	6

== Roster ==
1988 Oklahoma Sooners football team roster
Players
Coaches
Offense

Pos.	#	Name	Class
SO	12	J. J. Agee	So
RB	28	Rotnei Anderson	Sr
RB	20	Glen Bell
G	66	Brian Brauninger	So
WR	36	Eric Bross	Jr
WR	83	Carl Cabbiness	Sr
WR	16	Chris Cabbiness	So
QB	10	Steve Collins	Fr
WR		Adrian Cooper
RB		Rod Fisher
RB	32	Mike Gaddis	RFr
WR		Artie Guess
QB	4	Jamelle Holieway (C)	Sr
OL		Terron Manning
OL		Larry Medice
RB	5	Glyn Milburn	Fr
RB		Eric Mitchel
RB		Leon Perry
G	68	Anthony Phillips (C)	Sr
FB	33	Kenyon Rasheed	Fr
OL		Mike Sawatzky
RB		Don Smitherman
RB	25	Anthony Stafford (C)	Sr
RB		Damon Stell
QB	6	Charles Thompson	So
OT	76	Mark Van Keirsblick	Jr
OL		Mike Wise

Defense

Pos.	#	Name	Class
DL		Tom Backes
LB	40	Reggie Barnes	Fr
DB	27	Jason Belser	Fr
LB		Frank Blevins
LB	45	Joe Bowden	Fr
DE	43	Adrian Cooper	So
DL		Wayne Dickson
DT	77	Stacey Dillard	So
DL		Scott Evans
DB	49	Scott Garl (C)	Sr
DL		James Goode
NG	71	Harold Jones	So
LB	46	Kert Kaspar	Sr
DE	52	Corey Mayfield	Fr
DB		Kern McMichel
DB		Jerry Parks
DB	4	Terry Ray	Fr
DB	22	Kevin Thompson	Jr
NG	96	Andre Williams	Jr
LB	30	Chris Wilson	Fr
DT	93	Curtice Williams	Sr
NG	98	Dante Williams	Jr
NG	99	Tony Woods	Sr

Special teams

Pos.	#	Name	Class
K	13	R.D. Lashar	So
P	91	Todd Thomsen	Sr

Head coach

- Barry Switzer

Coordinators/assistant coaches

- Jim Donnan (OC)
- Gary Gibbs (DC)
- Scott Hill
- Merv Johnson (OL)
- Mike Jones
- Charley North
- Bobby Proctor
- Charlie Sadler (DL)
- Lucious Selmon (OLB & DE)

Legend

- (C) Team captain
- (S) Suspended
- (I) Ineligible
- Injured
- Redshirt

Roster

== Awards ==
DT Scott Evans

- All-Big Eight

DB Scott Garl

- All-Big Eight

OG Anthony Phillips

- consensus All-American
- NCAA Top Six Award

QB Charles Thompson

- All-Big Eight

DT Curtice Williams

- All-Big Eight

NG Tony Woods

- All-Big Eight

== After the season ==
=== Barry Switzer resigns ===
Following the season, the Sooners were placed on probation by the NCAA due to several incidents that occurred within the program. Switzer, his staff, and Oklahoma boosters were found to have been making illegal payments to several players. In particular, Oklahoma booster Bill Lambert was found to have illegally paid 100 to 150 players while recruiting coordinator Shirley Vaughn paid several dozen players through a ticket scalping scheme. Players from the Sooners' 1985 championship team also openly admitted to accepting illegal payments while playing at Oklahoma as part of the investigation. The Sooners were placed on probation for three years, were banned from bowl games for two years, and could not appear on live television for the 1989 season, along with recruiting restrictions. Oklahoma would also receive the death penalty if any of its programs were to commit any violations in any sport over the next five years.

In addition to recruiting violations and the NCAA investigation, the Sooners garnered more controversy due to off-field incidents involving players. During Switzer's tenure, players had been arrested for assault with a deadly weapon and rape. On February 13, 1989, quarterback Charles Thompson was arrested for attempting to solicet cocaine from an undercover FBI agent. On June 19, 1989, Barry Switzer resigned as the Sooners' head coach; at the time Switzer said he resigned willingly but later it was revealed that he was forced to resign.

=== NFL draft ===
The following players were selected in the 1989 NFL draft following the season.

Round	Pick	Player	Position	NFL team
6	152	Anthony Stafford	Wide receiver	Denver Broncos
6	165	Eric Mitchell	Running back	New England Patriots
8	216	Tony Woods	Defensive back	Chicago Bears
12	333	Anthony Phillips	Guard	Chicago Bears
