= 1988 Nebraska Cornhuskers football team =

American college football season

1988 Nebraska Cornhuskers football

Big 8 champion

Orange Bowl, L 3–23 vs. Miami (FL)
- Conference: Big Eight Conference

Ranking
- Coaches: No. 10
- AP: No. 10
- Record: 11–2 (7–0 Big 8)
- Head coach: Tom Osborne (16th season)
- Offensive scheme: I formation
- Defensive coordinator: Charlie McBride (8th season)
- Base defense: 5–2
- Home stadium: Memorial Stadium

1988 Big Eight Conference football standings
	Conf.					Overall
Team	W		L		T	W		L		T
No. 10 Nebraska $	7	–	0	–	0	11	–	2	–	0
No. 14 Oklahoma	6	–	1	–	0	9	–	3	–	0
No. 11 Oklahoma State	5	–	2	–	0	10	–	2	–	0
Colorado	4	–	3	–	0	8	–	4	–	0
Iowa State	3	–	4	–	0	5	–	6	–	0
Missouri	2	–	5	–	0	3	–	7	–	1
Kansas	1	–	6	–	0	1	–	10	–	0
Kansas State	0	–	7	–	0	0	–	11	–	0
$ – Conference champion; Rankings from AP Poll

The 1988 Nebraska Cornhuskers football team represented the University of Nebraska–Lincoln in the 1988 NCAA Division I-A football season. The team was coached by Tom Osborne and played their home games in Memorial Stadium in Lincoln, Nebraska.

== Schedule ==
Date	Time	Opponent	Rank	Site	TV	Result	Attendance	Source
August 27	7:00 pm	vs. No. 10 Texas A&M*	No. 2	Giants Stadium; East Rutherford, NJ (Kickoff Classic)	Raycom	W 23–14	58,172	
September 3	1:30 pm	Utah State*	No. 2	Memorial Stadium; Lincoln, NE		W 63–13	76,233	
September 10	7:00 pm	at No. 5 UCLA*	No. 2	Rose Bowl; Pasadena, CA	ABC	L 28–41	84,086	
September 24	6:00 pm	Arizona State*	No. 9	Memorial Stadium; Lincoln, NE	ESPN	W 47–16	76,312	
October 1	1:30 pm	UNLV*	No. 9	Memorial Stadium; Lincoln, NE		W 48–6	76,398	
October 8	1:00 pm	at Kansas	No. 9	Memorial Stadium; Lawrence, KS (rivalry)		W 63–10	32,500	
October 15	1:30 pm	No. 10 Oklahoma State^{†}	No. 7	Memorial Stadium; Lincoln, NE		W 63–42	76,432	
October 22	1:30 pm	at Kansas State	No. 5	KSU Stadium; Manhattan, KS (rivalry)		W 48–3	35,000	
October 29	1:30 pm	Missouri	No. 5	Memorial Stadium; Lincoln, NE (rivalry)		W 26–18	76,316	
November 5	1:00 pm	at Iowa State	No. 7	Cyclone Stadium; Ames, IA (rivalry)		W 51–16	50,158	
November 12	1:30 pm	No. 19 Colorado	No. 7	Memorial Stadium; Lincoln, NE (rivalry)		W 7–0	76,359	
November 19	2:30 pm	at No. 9 Oklahoma	No. 7	Oklahoma Memorial Stadium; Norman, OK (rivalry)	CBS	W 7–3	75,004	
January 2, 1989	7:00 pm	vs. No. 2 Miami (FL)*	No. 6	Miami Orange Bowl; Miami, FL (Orange Bowl) (rivalry)	NBC	L 3–23	79,480	
*Non-conference game; ^{†}Homecoming; Rankings from AP Poll released prior to the game; All times are in Central time

== Roster and coaching staff ==
1988 Nebraska Cornhuskers football team roster
Players
Coaches
Offense

Pos.	#	Name	Class
IB	4	George Achola	So
C	59	Jeff Anderson	Jr
G	53	Mark Antonietti	Sr
SE	18	Tony Avant	Jr
SE	82	Chip Bahe	Jr
WB	21	Richard Bell	Jr
G	69	Bill Bobbora	Jr
WB	33	Dana Brinson	Sr
FB	29	Bryan Carpenter	Jr
IB	32	Ken Clark	Jr
IB	1	Ray Coleman	Sr
WB	6	Brad Devall	So
QB	12	Jerry Dunlap	So
C	54	David Edeal	So
OT	73	Steve Engstrom	So
OT	77	Terry Eyman	So
C	52	Roger Fitzke	Jr
IB	3	Leodis Flowers	Fr
TE	80	Chris Garrett	Fr
TE	87	Keith Gawrick	So
QB	14	Gerry Gdowski	Jr
OT	70	Doug Glaser	Jr
SE	19	Morgan Gregory	Jr
OT	61	Mike Griffin	Jr
TE	94	Corey Grobe	Sr
FB	24	Brian Harchelroad	Jr
FB	37	Tim Johnk	So
QB	2	Mickey Joseph	Fr
G	65	Andy Keeler	Sr
FB	36	Barry Kitrell	Sr
IB	34	Tyreese Knox	Sr
TE	85	Monte Kratzenstein	Jr
SE	83	Tim McCoy	Jr
TE	43	Todd Millikan	Sr
G	76	John Nelson	Sr
TE	86	Chris O'Gara	Jr
QB	11	Mike Preston	Jr
OT	78	Tom Punt	So
IB	20	Terry Rodgers	Jr
G	64	John Roschal	Jr
OT	72	Brad Rother	Jr
FB	25	Sam Schmidt	Jr
OT	62	Bob Sledge	Sr
QB	9	Steve Taylor	Sr
WB	22	Nate Turner	Fr
WB	31	Jamie Worden	Sr
C	68	Jake Young	Jr

Defense

Pos.	#	Name	Class
DT	96	Le Andre Anderson	So
S	23	Mark Blazek	Sr
OLB	81	Kurt Broer	Sr
DT	95	Paul Brungardt	So
LB	37	Peter Buchanan	Sr
LB	49	Chris Caliendo	Jr
SS	17	Reggie Cooper	So
CB	45	Jon Crippen	So
OLB	88	Mike Croel	So
CB	28	John Custard	Sr
DT	98	Joe D'Alesio	Jr
SS	7	Jim Dobesh	So
DT	90	Tye Doll	Jr
MG	63	Brian Edgren	So
MG	97	Pat Engelbert	So
LB	47	LeRoy Etienne	Sr
LB	51	Brad Ferguson	Jr
CB	10	Charles Fryar	Sr
DT	84	Willie Griffin	Sr
LB	39	Mark Hagge	Jr
CB	8	Lorenzo Hicks	Sr
S	4	Tim Jackson	Sr
LB	55	Randall Jobman	Jr
LB	67	Rob Leuck	Jr
CB	18	Lance Lewis	Fr
CB	5	Tahaun Lewis	So
OLB	93	Jon Marco	Sr
LB	35	Brian Miller	Sr
MG	99	Kevin Miller	Jr
OLB	42	Jeff Mills	Jr
MG	13	Junior Monarrez	Jr
MG	74	Mike Murray	Jr
MG	96	Lawrence Pete	Sr
CB	38	Bruce Pickens	So
MG	92	Sean Putnam	Sr
QB	14	Pete Maletto	So
CB	26	Marvin Sanders	Jr
CB		Bill Settles
DT	56	Joe Sims	So
DT	66	Kurt Skradis	Sr
OLB	87	Dan Svehla	So
OLB	89	Broderick Thomas	Sr
LB	40	Pat Tyrance	So
DT	75	Ray Valladao	Jr
SS	41	Scott Vampola	Jr
CB	27	Cartier Walker	Sr
LB	57	Kenny Walker	So
MG	61	Jim Wanek	So
DT	91	Kent Wells	Jr
S	1	Rick Wendland	Jr
S	15	Wendell Wooten	Sr

Special teams

Pos.	#	Name	Class
PK	44	Gregg Barrios	So
P	48	Scott Beckler	Jr
PK	16	Chris Drennan	Jr
P/PK	13	Tom Janky	So
P	46	John Kroeker	Sr

Head coach

- Tom Osborne
  16th season
  25th year at Nebraska
  Alma mater: Nebraska

Coordinators/assistant coaches

- Charlie McBride
  8th season as DC/DL coach
  12th year at Nebraska
  Alma mater: Colorado
- Ron Brown
  2nd season as WR/TE coach
  2nd year at Nebraska
  Alma mater: Brown
- Dan Young
  6th season as OL/K coach
  6th year at Nebraska
  Alma mater: Reed
- Milt Tenopir
  15th season as OL coach
  15th year at Nebraska
  Alma mater: Sterling
- Tony Samuel
  3rd season as OLB coach
  3rd year at Nebraska
  Alma mater: Nebraska
- George Darlington
  DB coach
  16th year at Nebraska
  Alma mater: Rutgers
- Frank Solich
  6th season as RB coach
  10th year at Nebraska
  Alma mater: Nebraska
- Boyd Epley
  20th season as S&C coach
  20th year at Nebraska
  Alma mater: Nebraska
- Jack Pierce
  10th year at Nebraska
- John Melton
  16th season as LB coach
  27th year at Nebraska
  Alma mater: Wyoming

Legend

- (C) Team captain
- (S) Suspended
- (I) Ineligible
- Injured
- Redshirt

Roster
Last update: 2011-01-17

=== Depth chart ===
Defense

FS
Tim Jackson
Marvin Sanders
Wendell Wooten

OUTSIDE	INSIDE	INSIDE	OUTSIDE
Jeff Mills	Leroy Etienne	Chris Caliendo	Broderick Thomas
Jon Marco	Randall Jobman	Pat Tyrance	Mike Croel
Kurt Broer	Mark Hagge	Brad Ferguson	Dan Svehla

SS
Reggie Cooper
Mark Blazek
Scott Vampola

CB
Charles Fryar
Tahaun Lewis
Jon Crippen

DE	NT	DE
Kent Wells	Lawrence Pete	Willie Griffin
Paul Brungardt	Mike Murray	Joe Sims
Ray Valladao	Junior Monarrez	Le Andre Anderson

CB
Lorenzo Hicks
Bruce Pickens
John Custard

Offense

SE
Morgan Gregory
Nate Turner
Chip Bahe

LT	LG	C	RG	RT
Bob Sledge	Andy Keeler	Jake Young	John Nelson	Doug Glaser
Tom Punt	Mark Antonietti	Jeff Anderson	Bill Bobbora	Terry Eyman
Steve Engstrom	Jim Wanek	Roger Fitzke	Chris O'Gara	Steve Engstrom

TE
Todd Millikan
Monte Kratzenstein
Corey Grobe

WB
Richard Bell
Dana Brinson
Jamie Worden

QB
Steve Taylor
Gerry Gdowski
Mickey Joseph

RB
Ken Clark
Tyreese Knox
Terry Rodgers
Leodis Flowers

FB
Bryan Carpenter
Lance Lewis
Brian Harchelroad

Special teams
PK Gregg Barrios
Chris Drennan
P John Kroeker

== Game summaries ==
=== Texas A&M ===
Texas A&M vs Nebraska [box score]

Team	1	2	3	4	Total
Texas A&M	7	0	0	7	14
• Nebraska	0	3	9	11	23

- Date: 1988-08-27
- Location: Giants Stadium, East Rutherford, New Jersey
- Game attendance: 58,162

=== Utah State ===
Utah State at Nebraska [box score]

Team	1	2	3	4	Total
Utah State	0	0	7	6	13
• Nebraska	14	14	14	21	63

- Date: 1988-09-03
- Location: Memorial Stadium, Lincoln, Nebraska
- Game attendance: 76,233

=== At UCLA ===
Nebraska at UCLA [box score]

Team	1	2	3	4	Total
Nebraska	0	13	7	8	28
• UCLA	28	10	3	0	41

- Date: 1988-09-10
- Location: Rose Bowl, Pasadena, California
- Game attendance: 84,086
- TV announcers (ABC): Keith Jackson, Bob Griese, and Mike Adamle

=== Arizona State ===
Arizona State at Nebraska [box score]

Team	1	2	3	4	Total
Arizona State	13	3	0	0	16
• Nebraska	9	21	0	17	47

- Date: 1988-09-24
- Location: Memorial Stadium, Lincoln, Nebraska
- Game attendance: 76,312

=== UNLV ===
UNLV at Nebraska [box score]

Team	1	2	3	4	Total
UNLV	0	0	0	6	6
• Nebraska	7	13	15	13	48

- Date: 1988-10-01
- Location: Memorial Stadium, Lincoln, Nebraska
- Game attendance: 76,398

=== At Kansas ===
Nebraska at Kansas [box score]

Team	1	2	3	4	Total
• Nebraska	28	21	7	7	63
Kansas	0	10	0	0	10

- Date: 1988-10-08
- Location: Memorial Stadium, Lawrence, Kansas
- Game attendance: 32,500

=== Oklahoma State ===
Oklahoma State at Nebraska [box score]

Team	1	2	3	4	Total
Oklahoma State	0	21	7	14	42
• Nebraska	35	14	7	7	63

- Date: 1988-10-15
- Location: Memorial Stadium, Lincoln, Nebraska
- Game attendance: 76,432

=== At Kansas State ===
Nebraska at Kansas State [box score]

Team	1	2	3	4	Total
• Nebraska	14	20	14	0	48
Kansas State	3	0	0	0	3

- Date: 1988-10-22
- Location: KSU Stadium, Manhattan, Kansas
- Game attendance: 35,000

=== Missouri ===
Missouri at Nebraska [box score]

Team	1	2	3	4	Total
Missouri	3	3	9	3	18
• Nebraska	0	0	17	9	26

- Date: 1988-10-29
- Location: Memorial Stadium, Lincoln, Nebraska
- Game attendance: 76,316

=== At Iowa State ===
Nebraska at Iowa State [box score]

Team	1	2	3	4	Total
• Nebraska	7	24	7	13	51
Iowa State	0	0	3	13	16

- Date: 1988-11-05
- Location: Cyclone Stadium, Ames, Iowa
- Game attendance: 35,000

=== Colorado ===
Colorado at Nebraska [box score]

Team	1	2	3	4	Total
Colorado	0	0	0	0	0
• Nebraska	0	0	7	0	7

- Date: 1988-11-12
- Location: Memorial Stadium, Lincoln, Nebraska
- Game attendance: 76,359

=== At Oklahoma ===
#7 Nebraska Cornhuskers (10–1) at #9 Oklahoma Sooners (9–1)

Quarter	1	2	3	4	Total
Nebraska	7	0	0	0	7
Oklahoma	0	0	3	0	3

at Oklahoma Memorial Stadium, Norman, Oklahoma

- Date: November 19, 1988
- Game time: 3:30 p.m. EDT
- Game weather: Rain
- Game attendance: 75,004
- TV announcers (CBS): Brent Musburger
- Box Score, Box Score

External videos
- Full game
- Game highlights

Team	Category	Player	Statistics
Nebraska	Passing	Steve Taylor	2/12, 48 Yds, INT
Nebraska	Rushing	Ken Clark	24 Rush, 167 Yds
Nebraska	Receiving	Richard Bell	2 Rec, 48 Yds
Oklahoma	Passing	Charles Thompson	3/9, 39 Yds, INT
Oklahoma	Rushing	Mike Gaddis	12 Rush, 45 Yds
Oklahoma	Receiving	Artie Guess	1 Rec, 28 Yds

Scoring summary

Quarter	Time	Drive			Team	Scoring information	Score	
Quarter	Time	Plays	Yards	TOP	Team	Scoring information	NU	OU
1	11:06	9	80		Nebraska	Steve Taylor 1-yard touchdown run, Gregg Berrios kick good	7	0
3	1:50	6	19		Oklahoma	29-yard field goal by R.D. Lashar	7	3
"TOP" = time of possession. For other American football terms, see Glossary of American football.							7	3

=== Orange Bowl (vs Miami (FL)) ===
Miami vs Nebraska [box score]

Team	1	2	3	4	Total
• Miami	7	13	0	3	23
Nebraska	0	0	3	0	3

- Date: 1989-01-02
- Location: Miami Orange Bowl, Miami
- Game attendance: 79,480

== Rankings ==
Ranking movements Legend: ██ Increase in ranking ██ Decrease in ranking
	Week																
Poll	Pre	1	2	3	4	5	6	7	8	9	10	11	12	13	14	15	Final
AP	2	2	2	11	10	9	9	7	5	5	7	7	7	6	6	6	10
Coaches																	10

== Awards ==
Award	Name(s)
All-America 1st team	Broderick Thomas, Jake Young
Big 8 coach of the Year	Tom Osborne
Big 8 Defensive Player of the Year	Broderick Thomas
Big 8 Defensive Newcomer of the Year	Bruce Pickens
All-Big 8 1st team	Dana Brinson, Ken Clark, LeRoy Etienne, Charles Fryar, Willie Griffin, Tim Jackson, Andy Keeler, Todd Millikan, Lawrence Pete, Bob Sledge, Steve Taylor, Broderick Thomas, Jake Young
All-Big 8 2nd team	Reggie Cooper, Doug Glaser
All-Big 8 honorable mention	Richard Bell, Mark Blazek, Chris Caliendo, Bryan Carpenter, Morgan Gregory, John Kroeker, Jeff Mills, John Nelson

== NFL and pro players ==
The following Nebraska players who participated in the 1988 season later moved on to the next level and joined a professional or semi-pro team as draftees or free agents.

Name	Team
Richard Bell	Pittsburgh Steelers
Dana Brinson	San Diego Chargers
Pete Buchanan	Toronto Argonauts
Ken Clark	Indianapolis Colts
Reggie Cooper	Dallas Cowboys
Mike Croel	Denver Broncos
LeRoy Etienne	San Francisco 49ers
Tim Jackson	Dallas Cowboys
Keith Jones	Cleveland Browns
Jeff Mills	San Diego Chargers
Lawrence Pete	Detroit Lions
Bruce Pickens	Atlanta Falcons
Tim Rother	Los Angeles Raiders
Joe Sims	Atlanta Falcons
Steve Taylor	Edmonton Eskimos
Broderick Thomas	Tampa Bay Buccaneers
Nate Turner	Buffalo Bills
Kenny Walker	Denver Broncos
Kent Wells	New York Giants
