= 1988 Oklahoma State Cowboys football team =

American college football season

1988 Oklahoma State Cowboys football

Holiday Bowl champion

Holiday Bowl, W 62–14 vs. Wyoming
- Conference: Big Eight Conference

Ranking
- Coaches: No. 11
- AP: No. 11
- Record: 10–2 (5–2 Big 8)
- Head coach: Pat Jones (5th season)
- Offensive coordinator: Larry Coker (6th season)
- Defensive coordinator: Louis Campbell (4th season)
- Home stadium: Lewis Field

1988 Big Eight Conference football standings
	Conf.					Overall
Team	W		L		T	W		L		T
No. 10 Nebraska $	7	–	0	–	0	11	–	2	–	0
No. 14 Oklahoma	6	–	1	–	0	9	–	3	–	0
No. 11 Oklahoma State	5	–	2	–	0	10	–	2	–	0
Colorado	4	–	3	–	0	8	–	4	–	0
Iowa State	3	–	4	–	0	5	–	6	–	0
Missouri	2	–	5	–	0	3	–	7	–	1
Kansas	1	–	6	–	0	1	–	10	–	0
Kansas State	0	–	7	–	0	0	–	11	–	0
$ – Conference champion; Rankings from AP Poll

The 1988 Oklahoma State Cowboys football team represented Oklahoma State University in the 1988 NCAA Division I-A college football season. Future OSU head coach Mike Gundy was the starting QB for the Cowboys, while senior WR Hart Lee Dykes and junior RB Barry Sanders were both named first team All-American. Sanders won the Heisman Trophy as the nation's most outstanding player for the season. Sanders was also the Offensive MVP of the 1988 Holiday Bowl, and Junior LB Sim Drain III was the Defensive MVP.

== Schedule ==
The Cowboys finished the regular season with a 9–2 record. In 1988, in what has been called the greatest season by an individual player in college football history, running back Barry Sanders led the nation by averaging 7.6 yards per carry and over 200 yards per game, including rushing for over 300 yards in four games. He set college football season records with 2,628 yards rushing, 3,249 total yards, 234 points, 39 touchdowns, of which 37 were rushing (also a record), five consecutive 200 yard games, scored at least two touchdowns in 11 consecutive games, and nine times he scored at least three touchdowns. Sanders also ran for 222 yards and scored five touchdowns in his three quarters of action in the Holiday Bowl, a game that was not included with his season statistics.

Date	Opponent	Rank	Site	TV	Result	Attendance	Source
September 10	Miami (OH)*		Lewis Field; Stillwater, OK		W 52–20	43,200	
September 24	Texas A&M*	No. 18	Lewis Field; Stillwater, OK		W 52–15	50,440	
October 1	Tulsa*	No. 13	Lewis Field; Stillwater, OK (rivalry)		W 56–35	45,100	
October 8	at Colorado	No. 13	Folsom Field; Boulder, CO		W 41–21	41,854	
October 15	at No. 7 Nebraska	No. 10	Memorial Stadium; Lincoln, NE	CSN	L 42–63	76,432	
October 22	Missouri^{†}	No. 15	Lewis Field; Stillwater, OK		W 49–21	46,900	
October 29	at Kansas State	No. 12	KSU Stadium; Manhattan, KS		W 45–27	16,000	
November 5	No. 8 Oklahoma	No. 12	Lewis Field; Stillwater, OK (Bedlam)	ESPN	L 28–31	50,440	
November 12	Kansas	No. 14	Lewis Field; Stillwater, OK		W 63–24	40,100	
November 19	at Iowa State	No. 13	Cyclone Stadium; Ames, IA		W 49–28	38,163	
December 4	vs. Texas Tech*	No. 12	Tokyo Dome; Tokyo, Japan (Coca-Cola Classic)	CBS	W 45–42	56,000	
December 30	vs. No. 15 Wyoming*	No. 12	Jack Murphy Stadium; San Diego, CA (Holiday Bowl)	ESPN	W 62–14	60,178	
*Non-conference game; ^{†}Homecoming; Rankings from AP Poll released prior to the game

== Rankings ==
Ranking movements Legend: ██ Increase in ranking ██ Decrease in ranking — = Not ranked
	Week																
Poll	Pre	1	2	3	4	5	6	7	8	9	10	11	12	13	14	15	Final
AP	—	—	—	20	18	13	13	10	15	12	12	14	13	12	12	12	11
Coaches	—	—	—	—	20	14	13	10	16	12	12	15	14	12	12	12	11

== Game summaries ==
=== At Nebraska ===
Oklahoma State Cowboys at Nebraska Cornhuskers – Game summary

Quarter	1	2	3	4	Total
#10 Cowboys	0	21	7	14	42
#7 Cornhuskers	35	14	7	7	63

at Memorial Stadium, Lincoln, NE

- Date: October 15
- Game attendance: 76,432

Game information

First quarter

Second quarter

Third quarter

Fourth quarter

Leading Passers

- OKST – Mike Gundy -
- NEB –

Leading Rushers

- OKST – Barry Sanders - 35 carries, 189 yards, 4 TD
- NEB – Ken Clark - 27 carries, 256 yards, 3 TD

Leading Receivers

- OKST –
- NEB –

=== At Kansas State ===
Oklahoma State Cowboys at Kansas State Wildcats – Game summary

Quarter	1	2	3	4	Total
#12 Cowboys	21	3	14	7	45
Wildcats	14	3	3	7	27

at KSU Stadium, Manhattan, KS

- Date: October 29
- Game attendance: 16,000

Game information

First quarter

- KSU – Washington 13-yard pass from Carl Straw (Porter kick). Wildcats 7–0.
- OKST – Parker 63-yard pass from Mike Gundy (Blanchard kick). Tied 7–7.
- KSU – Friedrich fumble recover in end zone (Porter kick). Wildcats 14–7.
- OKST – Barry Sanders 26-yard run (Blanchard kick). Tied 14–14.
- OKST – Barry Sanders 38-yard run (Blanchard kick). Cowboys 21–14.

Second quarter

- OKST – Cary Blanchard 35-yard field goal. Cowboys 24–14.
- KSU – Mark Porter 32-yard field goal. Cowboys 24–17.

Third quarter

- OKST – Hart Lee Dykes 28-yard pass from Mike Gundy (Blanchard kick). Cowboys 31–17.
- KSU – Mark Porter 37-yard field goal. Cowboys 31–20.
- OKST – Vance Vice 1-yard pass from Mike Gundy (Blanchard kick). Cowboys 38–20.

Fourth quarter

- KSU – Lee Pickett 1-yard run (Porter kick). Cowboys 38–27.
- OKST – Barry Sanders 17-yard run (Blanchard kick), 6:38. Cowboys 45–27.

Leading Passers

- KSU –
- OKST – Mike Gundy - 15/19, 228 yards, 3 TD, 2 INT

Leading Rushers

- KSU –
- OKST – Barry Sanders - 37 carries, 320 yards, 3 TD

Leading Receivers

- KSU –
- OKST – Hart Lee Dykes - 9 receptions, 127 yards, TD

=== Oklahoma ===
#8 Oklahoma Sooners (7–1) at #12 Oklahoma State Cowboys (8–1)

Quarter	1	2	3	4	Total
Oklahoma	21	3	0	7	31
Oklahoma St	7	7	0	14	28

at Lewis Field, Stillwater, Oklahoma

- Date: November 5, 1988
- Game weather: Partly cloudy, 58 °F (14 °C)
- Game attendance: 50,440
- TV announcers (ESPN): Roger Twibell and Lee Corso

Oklahoma State's Brent Parker dropped a potential game-winning touchdown pass in the end zone with 43 seconds left.

External videos
- Full game
- Game highlights

Team	Category	Player	Statistics
Oklahoma	Passing	Charles Thompson	2/5, 24 Yds
Oklahoma	Rushing	Mike Gaddis	18 Rush, 213 Yds, 2 TD
Oklahoma	Receiving	Leon Perry	1 Rec, 17 Yds
Oklahoma St	Passing	Mike Gundy	18/28, 228 Yds, TD, 3 INT
Oklahoma St	Rushing	Barry Sanders	39 Rush, 215 Yds, 2 TD
Oklahoma St	Receiving	Hart Lee Dykes	9 Rec, 122 Yds, TD

Scoring summary

Quarter	Time	Drive			Team	Scoring information	Score	
Quarter	Time	Plays	Yards	TOP	Team	Scoring information	OU	OSU
1					Oklahoma	Mike Gaddis 13-yard touchdown run, R.D. Lashar kick good	7	0
1		1	44	0:07	Oklahoma	Mike Gaddis 44-yard touchdown run, R.D. Lashar kick good	14	0
1	6:52				Oklahoma St	Mike Gundy 4-yard touchdown run, Cary Blanchard kick good	14	7
1		11	80	4:17	Oklahoma	Leon Perry 7-yard touchdown run, R.D. Lashar kick good	21	7
2		8	89	3:48	Oklahoma St	Hart Lee Dykes 2-yard touchdown reception from Mike Gundy, Cary Blanchard kick good	21	14
2	2:08				Oklahoma	27-yard field goal by R.D. Lashar	24	14
4	13:37				Oklahoma St	Barry Sanders 1-yard touchdown run, Cary Blanchard kick good	24	21
4	8:45	8	72	3:12	Oklahoma St	Barry Sanders 1-yard touchdown run, Cary Blanchard kick good	24	28
4	2:33	13	80	6:12	Oklahoma	Charles Thompson 18-yard touchdown run, R.D. Lashar kick good	31	28
"TOP" = time of possession. For other American football terms, see Glossary of American football.							31	28

=== Vs. Wyoming ===
Wyoming Cowboys vs. Oklahoma State Cowboys – Game summary

Quarter	1	2	3	4	Total
#12 Cowboys	7	10	28	17	62
#15 Cowboys	7	0	7	0	14

at Jack Murphy Stadium, San Diego, CA

- Date: December 30
- Game attendance: 60,641
- TV announcers (ESPN): Bob Carpenter, Kevin Kiley, Sharlene Hawkes

Game information

First quarter

- OKST – Barry Sanders 33-yard run (Blanchard kick). OKST Cowboys 7–0.
- WYO – Randy Welniak 4-yard run (kick). Tied 7–7.

Second quarter

- OKST – Barry Sanders 2-yard run (Blanchard kick). OKST Cowboys 14–7.
- OKST – Cary Blanchard 33-yard field goal. OKST Cowboys 17–7.

Third quarter

- OKST – Mike Gundy 12-yard pass to Brent Parker (Blanchard kick). OKST Cowboys 24–7.
- WYO – Randy Welniak 4-yard run (kick). OKST Cowboys 24–14.
- OKST – Barry Sanders 67-yard run (Blanchard kick). OKST Cowboys 31–14.
- OKST – Barry Sanders 1-yard run (Blanchard kick). OKST Cowboys 38–14.
- OKST – Barry Sanders 10-yard run (Blanchard kick). OKST Cowboys 45–14.

Fourth quarter

- OKST – Cary Blanchard 19-yard field goal. OKST Cowboys 48–14.
- OKST – Mike Gundy 25-yard pass to Hart Lee Dykes (Blanchard kick). OKST Cowboys 55–14.
- OKST – Chris Smith 5-yard run (Blanchard kick). OKST Cowboys 62–14.

Leading Passers

- OKST – Mike Gundy - 20/24, 315 yards, 2 TD
- WYO – Randy Welniak -

Leading Rushers

- OKST – Barry Sanders - 29 carries, 222 yards, 5 TD
- WYO –

Leading Receivers

- OKST – Hart Lee Dykes - 10 receptions, 163 yards, TD
- WYO –

== Roster ==
1988 Oklahoma State Cowboys football team roster
Players
Coaches
Offense

Pos.	#	Name	Class
C	51	John Boisvert	Sr
RB		Vernon Brown	So
		Don Cox	Sr
WR	11	Hart Lee Dykes	Sr
QB		Kenny Ford	Fr
WR	19	Jarrod Green	Jr
QB	12	Mike Gundy	Jr
RB	23	Gerald Hudson	So
		Bill Jones	Sr
G	73	Jason Kidder	Sr
TE		Robert Kirksey
		Matt Kolb	Sr
FB	32	Garrett Limbrick	Sr
WR	17	Curtis Mayfield	So
RB		Mitch Nash	Sr
WR	29	Brent Parker	So
RB	21	Barry Sanders	Jr
QB		Chris Smith	So
G	59	Chris Stanley	Sr
TE	93	Vance Vice	Jr
OL		Web
RB		Cecil Wilson	So
OT	62	Mike Wolfe	Sr
OT	56	Byron Woodard	Sr

Defense

Pos.	#	Name	Class
DL	98	David Bailey
CB	1	Mike Clark
DL	91	Brandon Colbert
LB	58	Torrance Cummings
LB	53	Sim Drain III	Jr
DL		Rod Gaines	Sr
CB	2	Melvin Gilliam
DL	31	Devin Jones
DL	60	Marcus Jones	Sr
DB	4	Jason Juhl
CB	5	Joe King
FS	3	Chris Lowery
DL	57	Shawn Mackey
		Greg McCalister	Sr
SS	7	Lamar McGriggs
DL		Ruben Oliver	So
LB	37	Bobby Raynor	So
DL		Stacey Satterwhite
DB	45	Rod Smith

Special teams

Pos.	#	Name	Class
K	25	Cary Blanchard	Fr

Head coach

- Pat Jones

Coordinators/assistant coaches

- Larry Coker – Offensive coordinator
- Houston Nutt – Quarterback/Wide receivers
- Bill Shimek – Running backs
- Steve Gardner – Tight ends
- Brad Seely – Offensive line
- Louis Campbell – Defensive coordinator/defensive backs
- George Walstad – Defensive line
- Kenith Pope – Defensive ends
- Jonny Barr – Linebackers

Legend

- (C) Team captain
- (S) Suspended
- (I) Ineligible
- Injured
- Redshirt

== Awards and honors ==
- Barry Sanders: Heisman Trophy, Maxwell Award, Walter Camp Award, Sporting News College Football Player of the Year, Big 8 Offensive Player of the Year, unanimous first-team All-American
- Hart Lee Dykes: consensus first-team All-American

== 1989 NFL draft ==
The following players were drafted into professional football following the season.

Player	Position	Round	Pick	Franchise
Barry Sanders	Running back	1	3	Detroit Lions
Hart Lee Dykes	Wide receiver	1	16	New England Patriots
