= 1988 Kansas Jayhawks football team =

American college football season

1988 Kansas Jayhawks football
- Conference: Big Eight Conference
- Record: 1–10 (1–6 Big 8)
- Head coach: Glen Mason (1st season)
- Offensive coordinator: Pat Ruel (1st season)
- Home stadium: Memorial Stadium

1988 Big Eight Conference football standings
	Conf.					Overall
Team	W		L		T	W		L		T
No. 10 Nebraska $	7	–	0	–	0	11	–	2	–	0
No. 14 Oklahoma	6	–	1	–	0	9	–	3	–	0
No. 11 Oklahoma State	5	–	2	–	0	10	–	2	–	0
Colorado	4	–	3	–	0	8	–	4	–	0
Iowa State	3	–	4	–	0	5	–	6	–	0
Missouri	2	–	5	–	0	3	–	7	–	1
Kansas	1	–	6	–	0	1	–	10	–	0
Kansas State	0	–	7	–	0	0	–	11	–	0
$ – Conference champion; Rankings from AP Poll

The 1988 Kansas Jayhawks football team represented the University of Kansas as a member of the Big Eight Conference during the 1988 NCAA Division I-A football season. Led by first-year head coach Glen Mason, the Jayhawks compiled an overall record of 1–10 with a mark of 1–6 in conference play, placing seventh in the Big 8. The team played home games at Memorial Stadium in Lawrence, Kansas.

== Schedule ==
Date	Time	Opponent	Site	TV	Result	Attendance	Source
September 10	12:00 p.m.	Baylor*	Memorial Stadium; Lawrence, KS	Raycom	L 14–27	43,200	
September 17	6:00 p.m.	at No. 6 Auburn*	Jordan-Hare Stadium; Auburn, AL		L 7–56	55,700	
September 24	3:00 p.m.	at California*	California Memorial Stadium; Berkeley, CA		L 21–52	34,000	
October 1	1:00 p.m.	New Mexico State*	Memorial Stadium; Lawrence, KS		L 29–42	33,500	
October 8	1:00 p.m.	No. 9 Nebraska	Memorial Stadium; Lawrence, KS (rivalry)		L 10–63	32,500	
October 15	12:00 p.m.	Colorado^{†}	Memorial Stadium; Lawrence, KS		L 9–21	22,500	
October 22	1:00 p.m.	at Iowa State	Cyclone Stadium; Ames, IA		L 14–42	43,180	
October 29	1:30 p.m.	at No. 8 Oklahoma	Oklahoma Memorial Stadium; Norman, OK	PPV	L 14–63	74,004	
November 5	1:00 p.m.	Kansas State	Memorial Stadium; Lawrence, KS (rivalry)		W 30–12	35,000	
November 12	1:30 p.m.	at No. 14 Oklahoma State	Lewis Field; Stillwater, OK		L 24–63	40,100	
November 19	1:00 p.m.	Missouri	Memorial Stadium; Lawrence, KS (Border War)		L 17–55	25,000	
*Non-conference game; ^{†}Homecoming; Rankings from AP Poll released prior to the game; All times are in Central time

== Personnel ==
1988 Kansas Jayhawks football team roster
Players
Coaches
Offense

Pos.	#	Name	Class
QB		Kelly Donohoe
HB		Rober Robben
RB		Tony Sands
WR		Willie Vaughn

Defense

Pos.	#	Name	Class
LB	99	Tony Barker	So
S		Doug Terry	Fr

Special teams

Pos.	#	Name	Class
K		Brad Fleeman

Head coach

- Glen Mason

Coordinators/assistant coaches

Legend

- (C) Team captain
- (S) Suspended
- (I) Ineligible
- Injured
- Redshirt

== Game summaries ==
=== At Oklahoma ===
Kansas Jayhawks (0–7) at #8 Oklahoma Sooners (6–1)

Quarter	1	2	3	4	Total
Kansas	14	0	0	0	14
Oklahoma	14	7	14	28	63

at Oklahoma Memorial Stadium, Norman, Oklahoma

- Date: October 29, 1988
- Game attendance: 74,004

Willie Vaughn set school record for career touchdown receptions.

Team	Category	Player	Statistics
Kansas	Passing	Kelly Donohoe	13/24, 260 Yds, TD, 3 INT
Kansas	Rushing	Tony Sands	8 Rush, 34 Yds
Kansas	Receiving	Willie Vaughn	5 Rec, 161 Yds, TD
Oklahoma	Passing	Jamelle Holieway	7/7, 104 Yds, TD
Oklahoma	Rushing	Charles Thompson	14 Rush, 118 Yds, 2 TD
Oklahoma	Receiving	Artie Guess	3 Rec, 49 Yds, TD

Scoring summary

Quarter	Time	Drive			Team	Scoring information	Score	
Quarter	Time	Plays	Yards	TOP	Team	Scoring information	KU	OU
1					Oklahoma	Damon Stell 9-yard touchdown run, R.D. Lashar kick good	0	7
1		9	80		Kansas	Roger Robben 1-yard touchdown run, Brad Fleeman kick good	7	7
1		10	61		Oklahoma	Charles Thompson 1-yard touchdown run, R.D. Lashar kick good	7	14
1		1	80		Kansas	Willie Vaughn 80-yard touchdown reception from Kelly Donohoe, Brad Fleeman kick good	14	14
2					Oklahoma	Charles Thompson 1-yard touchdown run, R.D. Lashar kick good	14	21
3					Oklahoma	Eric Mitchel 24-yard touchdown run, R.D. Lashar kick good	14	28
3					Oklahoma	Jamelle Holieway 1-yard touchdown run, R.D. Lashar kick good	14	35
4					Oklahoma	Interception returned 80 yards for touchdown by Scott Garl, R.D. Lashar kick good	14	42
4					Oklahoma	Fumble recovery in end zone by Glyn Milburn, R.D. Lashar kick good	14	49
4					Oklahoma	Artie Guess 21-yard touchdown reception from Jamelle Holieway, R.D. Lashar kick good	14	56
4					Oklahoma	Glen Bell 1-yard touchdown run, R.D. Lashar kick good	14	63
"TOP" = time of possession. For other American football terms, see Glossary of American football.							14	63
