= 1988 Kansas State Wildcats football team =

American college football season

1988 Kansas State Wildcats football
- Conference: Big Eight Conference
- Record: 0–11 (0–7 Big 8)
- Head coach: Stan Parrish (3rd season)
- Offensive coordinator: Mike Deal (2nd season)
- Defensive coordinator: Jon Tenuta (1st season)
- Home stadium: KSU Stadium

1988 Big Eight Conference football standings
	Conf.					Overall
Team	W		L		T	W		L		T
No. 10 Nebraska $	7	–	0	–	0	11	–	2	–	0
No. 14 Oklahoma	6	–	1	–	0	9	–	3	–	0
No. 11 Oklahoma State	5	–	2	–	0	10	–	2	–	0
Colorado	4	–	3	–	0	8	–	4	–	0
Iowa State	3	–	4	–	0	5	–	6	–	0
Missouri	2	–	5	–	0	3	–	7	–	1
Kansas	1	–	6	–	0	1	–	10	–	0
Kansas State	0	–	7	–	0	0	–	11	–	0
$ – Conference champion; Rankings from AP Poll

The 1988 Kansas State Wildcats football team represented Kansas State University in the 1988 NCAA Division I-A football season. The team's head football coach was Stan Parrish. The Wildcats played their home games in KSU Stadium. They finished with a record of 0–11 overall and 0–7 in Big Eight Conference play, placing last in the conference. The Wildcats scored 171 points and gave up 448.

This was the last season for head coach Stan Parrish; Iowa offensive coordinator and quarterbacks coach Bill Snyder replaced him in 1989.

== Schedule ==
Date	Opponent	Site	Result	Attendance	Source
September 3	at Tulsa*	Skelly Field; Tulsa, OK	L 9–35	21,541	
September 10	No. 17 Iowa*	KSU Stadium; Manhattan, KS	L 10–45	21,000	
September 17	at Tulane*	Louisiana Superdome; New Orleans, LA	L 16–20	24,490	
October 1	Louisiana Tech*^{†}	KSU Stadium; Manhattan, KS	L 28–31	24,000	
October 8	Missouri	KSU Stadium; Manhattan, KS	L 21–52	19,000	
October 15	at No. 10 Oklahoma	Oklahoma Memorial Stadium; Norman, OK	L 24–70	73,800	
October 22	No. 5 Nebraska	KSU Stadium; Manhattan, KS (rivalry)	L 3–48	35,000	
October 29	No. 12 Oklahoma State	KSU Stadium; Manhattan, KS	L 27–45	16,000	
November 5	at Kansas	Memorial Stadium; Lawrence, KS (rivalry)	L 12–30	35,000	
November 12	Iowa State	KSU Stadium; Manhattan, KS (rivalry)	L 7–16	10,850	
November 19	at Colorado	Folsom Field; Boulder, CO (rivalry)	L 14–56	32,617	
*Non-conference game; ^{†}Homecoming; Rankings from AP Poll released prior to the game

== Game summaries ==
=== Iowa ===
Team	1	2	3	4	Total
• #17 Iowa	10	7	21	7	45
Kansas State	0	10	0	0	10

- Date: September 10
- Location: KSU Stadium, Manhattan, Kansas
- Game start: 1:00 PM CDT
- Elapsed time: 3:15
- Game attendance: 21,000
- Game weather: 90 °F (32 °C), Sunny, Wind SSW 16 mph (26 km/h)
- Referee: Sam Maphis

Scoring summary
1	11:35	IOWA	Stewart 1-yard run (Skillett kick)	IOWA 7–0
1	5:19	IOWA	Skillett 22-yard field goal	IOWA 10–0
2	13:25	KSU	Washington 12-yard pass from Straw (Porter kick)	IOWA 10–7
2	7:15	IOWA	Watkins 32-yard pass from Hartlieb (Skillett kick)	IOWA 17–7
2	5:15	KSU	Porter 38-yard field goal	IOWA 17–10
3	12:26	IOWA	Hartlieb 1-yard run (Skillett kick)	IOWA 24-10
3	9:00	IOWA	Stewart 1-yard run (Skillett kick)	IOWA 31-10
3	5:16	IOWA	Quast 94-yard interception return (Skillett kick)	IOWA 38-10
4	6:09	IOWA	Wise 81-yard interception return (Skillett kick)	IOWA 45–10

The Hawkeyes' 35-point victory extended the Wildcats' winless streak to 18 consecutive games. Iowa Offensive coordinator Bill Snyder was hired as Head coach at Kansas State following the regular season.

=== Oklahoma ===
Kansas State Wildcats (0–5) at #9 Oklahoma Sooners (6–1)

Quarter	1	2	3	4	Total
Kansas St	0	0	7	17	24
Oklahoma	35	14	7	14	70

at Oklahoma Memorial Stadium, Norman, Oklahoma

- Date: October 15, 1988
- Game attendance: 75,004
- Box Score

Kansas State's defense gave up a single game NCAA rushing record (768)

Team	Category	Player	Statistics
Kansas St	Passing	Carl Straw	27/42, 336 Yds, 3 TD, 2 INT
Kansas St	Rushing	Tom Dillon	6 Rush, 57 Yds
Kansas St	Receiving	Greg Washington	8 Rec, 146 Yds, 2 TD
Oklahoma	Passing	Jamelle Holieway	5/9, 58 Yds, TD, INT
Oklahoma	Rushing	Eric Mitchel	6 Rush, 161 Yds, 2 TD
Oklahoma	Receiving	Leon Perry	2 Rec, 33 Yds, TD

Scoring summary

Quarter	Time	Drive			Team	Scoring information	Score	
Quarter	Time	Plays	Yards	TOP	Team	Scoring information	KSU	OU
1					Oklahoma	Charles Thompson 11-yard touchdown run, R.D. Lashar kick good	0	7
1					Oklahoma	Charles Thompson 5-yard touchdown run, R.D. Lashar kick good	0	14
1					Oklahoma	Adrian Cooper 3-yard touchdown reception from Charles Thompson, R.D. Lashar kick good	0	21
1					Oklahoma	Mike Gaddis 53-yard touchdown run, R.D. Lashar kick good	0	28
1					Oklahoma	Charles Thompson 77-yard touchdown run, R.D. Lashar kick good	0	35
2					Oklahoma	Leon Perry 16-yard touchdown reception from Jamelle Holieway, R.D. Lashar kick good	0	42
2					Oklahoma	Rotnei Anderson 1-yard touchdown run, R.D. Lashar kick good	0	49
3					Kansas St	Greg Washington 6-yard touchdown reception from Carl Straw, Mark Porter kick good	7	49
3					Oklahoma	Eric Mitchel 85-yard touchdown run, R.D. Lashar kick good	7	56
4					Kansas St	Greg Washington 89-yard touchdown reception from Carl Straw, Mark Porter kick good	14	56
4					Oklahoma	Eric Mitchel 47-yard touchdown run, R.D. Lashar kick good	14	63
4					Kansas St	53-yard field goal by Mark Porter	17	63
4					Kansas St	Frank Hernandez 9-yard touchdown reception from Carl Straw, Mark Porter kick good	24	63
4					Oklahoma	Muti 34-yard touchdown run, R.D. Lashar kick good	24	70
"TOP" = time of possession. For other American football terms, see Glossary of American football.							24	70

=== Nebraska ===
Nebraska at Kansas State [box score]

Team	1	2	3	4	Total
• Nebraska	14	20	14	0	48
Kansas State	3	0	0	0	3

- Date: 1988-10-22
- Location: KSU Stadium, Manhattan, Kansas
- Game attendance: 35,000

== Roster ==
1988 Kansas State Wildcats football team roster
Players
Coaches
Offense

Pos.	#	Name	Class
WR		Mark Austin
RB		David Bowman
QB		Chris Cobb
RB		Tom Dillon
OL		Chad Faulkner
WR		Frank Hernandez
RB		Sonny Ray Jones
FB		Chad McKinnis
QB		Carl Straw
WR		Greg Washington

Defense

Pos.	#	Name	Class
DL		Maurice Henry

Special teams

Pos.	#	Name	Class
K		Mark Porter

Head coach

- Stan Parrish

Coordinators/assistant coaches

- Mike Deal – Offensive Coordinator
- Jon Tenuta – Defensive Coordinator
- Rich Rachel – Assistant head coach
- Kevin Ramsey – Outside linebacker
- Dave Flegal – Assistant
- Dale Steele – Assistant
- Mark Deal – Assistant
- Bill Singler – Assistant
- L. C. Cole – Assistant

Legend

- (C) Team captain
- (S) Suspended
- (I) Ineligible
- Injured
- Redshirt
