= 1988 Missouri Tigers football team =

American college football season

1988 Missouri Tigers football
- Conference: Big Eight Conference
- Record: 3–7–1 (2–5 Big 8)
- Head coach: Woody Widenhofer (4th season)
- Offensive coordinator: Wright Anderson (2nd season)
- Home stadium: Faurot Field

1988 Big Eight Conference football standings
	Conf.					Overall
Team	W		L		T	W		L		T
No. 10 Nebraska $	7	–	0	–	0	11	–	2	–	0
No. 14 Oklahoma	6	–	1	–	0	9	–	3	–	0
No. 11 Oklahoma State	5	–	2	–	0	10	–	2	–	0
Colorado	4	–	3	–	0	8	–	4	–	0
Iowa State	3	–	4	–	0	5	–	6	–	0
Missouri	2	–	5	–	0	3	–	7	–	1
Kansas	1	–	6	–	0	1	–	10	–	0
Kansas State	0	–	7	–	0	0	–	11	–	0
$ – Conference champion; Rankings from AP Poll

The 1988 Missouri Tigers football team was an American football team that represented the University of Missouri in the Big Eight Conference (Big 8) during the 1988 NCAA Division I-A football season. The team compiled a 3–7–1 record (2–5 against Big 8 opponents), finished in sixth place in the Big 8, and was outscored by opponents by a combined total of 330 to 234. Woody Widenhofer was the head coach for the fourth of four seasons. The team played its home games at Faurot Field in Columbia, Missouri.

The team's statistical leaders included Tommie Stowers with 667 rushing yards, Corey Welch with 524 passing yards, and Tim Bruton with 447 receiving yards. Their best player was Jeff Harper who held the legendary Barry Sanders to only 154 yards and 2 TDS.

== Schedule ==
Date	Opponent	Site	Result	Attendance	Source
September 10	Utah State*	Faurot Field; Columbia, MO	W 35–21	35,232	
September 17	Houston*	Faurot Field; Columbia, MO	L 7–31	36,287	
September 24	Indiana*	Faurot Field; Columbia, MO	T 28–28	41,053	
October 1	at No. 1 Miami (FL)*	Miami Orange Bowl; Miami, FL	L 0–55	40,654	
October 8	at Kansas State	KSU Stadium; Manhattan, KS	W 52–21	19,000	
October 15	Iowa State	Faurot Field; Columbia, MO (rivalry)	L 3–21	43,206	
October 22	at No. 15 Oklahoma State	Lewis Field; Stillwater, OK	L 21–49	46,900	
October 29	at No. 5 Nebraska	Memorial Stadium; Lincoln, NE (rivalry)	L 18–26	76,316	
November 5	Colorado	Faurot Field; Columbia, MO	L 8–45	36,931	
November 12	No. 8 Oklahoma	Faurot Field; Columbia, MO (rivalry)	L 7–16	40,704	
November 19	at Kansas	Memorial Stadium; Lawrence, KS (Border War)	W 55–17	25,000	
*Non-conference game; Rankings from AP Poll released prior to the game

== Game summaries ==
=== Oklahoma ===
#8 Oklahoma Sooners (8–1) at Missouri Tigers (2–6–1)

Quarter	1	2	3	4	Total
Oklahoma	10	6	0	0	16
Missouri	0	0	7	0	7

at Faurot Field, Columbia, Missouri

- Date: November 12, 1988
- Game attendance: 40,704
- Box Score

Team	Category	Player	Statistics
Oklahoma	Passing	Charles Thompson	1/4, 8 Yds, TD
Oklahoma	Rushing	Charles Thompson	26 Rush, 118 Yds
Oklahoma	Receiving	Eric Bross	1 Rec, 8 Yds, TD
Missouri	Passing	Brad Fitzmaurice	11/23, 160 Yds, TD, INT
Missouri	Rushing	Tommie Stowers	20 Rush, 83 Yds
Missouri	Receiving	Craig Lammers	6 Rec, 75 Yds, TD

Scoring summary

Quarter	Time	Drive			Team	Scoring information	Score	
Quarter	Time	Plays	Yards	TOP	Team	Scoring information	OU	MU
1					Oklahoma	Eric Bross 8-yard touchdown reception from Charles Thompson, R.D. Lashar kick good	7	0
1					Oklahoma	25-yard field goal by R.D. Lashar	10	0
2					Oklahoma	Anthony Stafford 1-yard touchdown run, R.D. Lashar kick no good (blocked)	16	0
4					Missouri	Craig Lammers 12-yard touchdown reception from Brad Fitzmaurice, Jeff Jacke kick good	16	7
"TOP" = time of possession. For other American football terms, see Glossary of American football.							16	7

== Personnel ==
1988 Missouri Tigers football team roster
Players
Coaches
Offense

Pos.	#	Name	Class
OT	75	Carl Bax	Sr
QB		Brad Fitzmaurice
WR		Craig Lammers
RB		Tommie Stowers
QB		Corey Welch

Defense

Pos.	#	Name	Class

Special teams

Pos.	#	Name	Class
K		Jeff Jacke

Head coach

- Woody Widenhofer

Coordinators/assistant coaches

- Wright Anderson – Offensive coordinator
- Frank Novak – Running backs
- Tim Billings – Tight ends
- Carl Reese – Defensive coordinator
- George Wheeler – Defensive line
- Ray Zingler – Assistant
- Mike Wade – Assistant
- Charles Coe – Assistant
- Steve Miller – Assistant

Legend

- (C) Team captain
- (S) Suspended
- (I) Ineligible
- Injured
- Redshirt
