= 1988 Holiday Bowl =

1988 SeaWorld Holiday Bowl
Oklahoma State Cowboys	Wyoming Cowboys
(9–2)	(11–1)
Big Eight	WAC
62	14
Head coach: Pat Jones	Head coach: Paul Roach
AP / Coaches; 12 / 12	AP / Coaches; 15 / 15
	1	2	3	4	Total
Oklahoma State	7	10	28	17	62
Wyoming	7	0	7	0	14
- Date: December 30, 1988
- Season: 1988
- Stadium: Jack Murphy Stadium
- Location: San Diego, California
- MVP: Offensive: Barry Sanders (Oklahoma State); Defensive: Sim Drain III (Oklahoma State)
- Halftime show: Marching bands
- Attendance: 60,641
- Payout: US$907,612 per team

United States TV coverage
- Network: ESPN
- Announcers: Bob Carpenter, Kevin Kiley, Sharlene Hawkes

The 1988 Holiday Bowl was a college football bowl game played December 30, 1988, in San Diego, California. It was part of the 1988 NCAA Division I-A football season. It featured the 12th ranked Oklahoma State Cowboys, and the 15th ranked Wyoming Cowboys.

== Game summary ==
1988 Holiday Bowl

Quarter	1	2	3	4	Total
Oklahoma State	7	10	28	17	62
Wyoming	7	0	7	0	14

at Jack Murphy Stadium • San Diego

- Date: December 30, 1988
- Game attendance: 60,641
- TV announcers (ESPN): Bob Carpenter, Kevin Kiley, Sharlene Hawkes
- Box score

Game information

First quarter

- (10:13) OSU – Barry Sanders 33-yard run, Cary Blanchard kick (Drive: - plays, 55 yards, -:--; Oklahoma State 7–0)
- (0:50) WYO – Randy Welniak 4-yard run, Sean Fleming kick (Drive: - plays, 46 yards, -:--; Tied 7–7)

Second quarter

- (1:29) OSU – Barry Sanders 2-yard run, Cary Blanchard kick (Drive: - plays, -- yards, -:--; Oklahoma State 14–7)
- (0:01) OSU – Cary Blanchard 33-yard field goal (Drive: - plays, -- yards, -:--; Oklahoma State 17–7)

Third quarter

- (11:53) OSU – Brent Parker 12-yard pass from Mike Gundy, Cary Blanchard kick (Drive: - plays, 80 yards, -:--; Oklahoma State 24–7)
- (8:31) WYO – Randy Welniak 4-yad run, Sean Fleming kick (Drive: 12 plays, 75 yards, -:--; Oklahoma State 24–14)
- (8:13) OSU – Barry Sanders 67-yard run, Cary Blanchard kick (Drive: 1 play, 67 yards, -:--; Oklahoma State 31–14)
- (3:43) OSU – Barry Sanders 1-yard run, Cary Blanchard kick (Drive: - plays, 68 yards, -:--; Oklahoma State 38–14)
- (0:06) OSU – Barry Sanders 10-yard run, Cary Blanchard kick (Drive: - plays, 79 yards, -:--; Oklahoma State 45–14)

Fourth quarter

- (12:58) OSU – Cary Blanchard 19-yard field goal (Drive: - plays, 22 yards, -:--; Oklahoma State 48–14)
- (6:58) OSU – Hart Lee Dykes 25-yard pass from Mike Gundy, Cary Blanchard kick (Drive: - plays, 71 yards, -:--; Oklahoma State 55–14)
- (1:13) OSU – Chris Smith 5-yard run, Cary Blanchard kick (Drive: - plays, 58 yards, -:--; Oklahoma State 62–14)

=== Statistics ===
Statistics	OSU	WYO
First downs	34	14
Plays–yards	80–698	62–204
Rushes–yards	51–320	30–33
Passing yards	378	171
Passing: comp–att–int	24–29–0	16–32–2
Time of possession	33:23	26:37

Team	Category	Player	Statistics
OSU	Passing	Mike Gundy	20/24, 315 yards, 3 TD
OSU	Rushing	Barry Sanders	29 carries, 222 yards, 5 TD
OSU	Receiving	Hart Lee Dykes	10 receptions, 163 yards, TD
WYO	Passing	Randy Welniak	15/30, 164 yards, 2 INT
WYO	Rushing	DeWaine Jones	2 carries, 19 yards
WYO	Receiving	Scott Gibson	4 receptions, 37 yards

Running back Barry Sanders scored on a 33-yard touchdown run for Oklahoma State, as they took a 7–0 lead. He would finish the game with 222 yards rushing and 5 touchdowns. Wyoming answered when quarterback Randy Welniak scored on a 4-yard touchdown run tying the game at 7. That ended the 1st quarter of play. Sanders scored on a 2-yard touchdown run, giving Oklahoma State a 14–7 lead. Cary Blanchard kicked a 33-yard field goal giving OSU a 17-7 halftime lead.

In the third quarter, Mike Gundy fired a 12-yard touchdown pass to wide receiver Brent Parker, increasing OSU's lead to 24–7. Welniak's 4-yard touchdown run cut the lead to 24–14. Sanders erupted for touchdown runs of 67, 1, and 10 yards as OSU took a 45–14 lead.

In the fourth quarter, Blanchard kicked a 19-yard field goal to make it 48–14. Mike Gundy's 25-yard pass to Hart Lee Dykes made it 55–14. A 5-yard rushing touchdown by backup quarterback Chris Smith made the final score Oklahoma State 62, Wyoming 14.
