= 1988 Colorado Buffaloes football team =

American college football season

1988 Colorado Buffaloes football

Freedom Bowl, L 17–20 vs. BYU
- Conference: Big Eight Conference
- Record: 8–4 (4–3 Big 8)
- Head coach: Bill McCartney (7th season)
- Offensive coordinator: Gerry DiNardo (5th season)
- Offensive scheme: Wishbone, I-Formation
- Defensive coordinator: Mike Hankwitz (1st season)
- Base defense: 3–4
- MVP: Eric Bieniemy
- Captains: Don DeLuzio; Erik Norgard
- Home stadium: Folsom Field

1988 Big Eight Conference football standings
	Conf.					Overall
Team	W		L		T	W		L		T
No. 10 Nebraska $	7	–	0	–	0	11	–	2	–	0
No. 14 Oklahoma	6	–	1	–	0	9	–	3	–	0
No. 11 Oklahoma State	5	–	2	–	0	10	–	2	–	0
Colorado	4	–	3	–	0	8	–	4	–	0
Iowa State	3	–	4	–	0	5	–	6	–	0
Missouri	2	–	5	–	0	3	–	7	–	1
Kansas	1	–	6	–	0	1	–	10	–	0
Kansas State	0	–	7	–	0	0	–	11	–	0
$ – Conference champion; Rankings from AP Poll

The 1988 Colorado Buffaloes football team represented the University of Colorado at Boulder in the Big Eight Conference during the 1988 NCAA Division I-A football season. Led by seventh-year head coach Bill McCartney, Colorado finished the regular season at 8–3 (4–3 in Big 8, fourth), and played their home games on campus at Folsom Field in Boulder, Colorado.

The eight wins were the most by the Buffaloes since the 1976 season, with narrow losses to ninth-ranked Oklahoma and No. 7 Nebraska.

Ranked 20th in the Coaches Poll, Colorado was invited to the Freedom Bowl in Anaheim, California, but was upset 17–20 by BYU of the Western Athletic Conference (WAC), led by redshirt freshman quarterback Ty Detmer.

== Schedule ==
Date	Opponent	Rank	Site	TV	Result	Attendance	Source
September 10	Fresno State*		Folsom Field; Boulder, CO	KCNC	W 45–3	32,417	
September 17	at No. 19 Iowa*		Kinnick Stadium; Iowa City, IA		W 24–21	67,700	
September 24	Oregon State*		Folsom Field; Boulder, CO		W 28–21	41,297	
October 1	at Colorado State*		Hughes Stadium; Fort Collins, CO (rivalry)		W 27–23	33,979	
October 8	No. 13 Oklahoma State		Folsom Field; Boulder, CO	KCNC	L 21–41	41,854	
October 15	at Kansas		Memorial Stadium; Lawrence, KS	KCNC	W 21–9	22,500	
October 22	No. 8 Oklahoma		Folsom Field; Boulder, CO	ESPN	L 14–17	49,716	
October 29	Iowa State^{†}		Folsom Field; Boulder, CO	KCNC	W 24–12	37,241	
November 5	at Missouri		Faurot Field; Columbia, MO		W 45–8	36,931	
November 12	at No. 7 Nebraska	No. 19	Memorial Stadium; Lincoln, NE (rivalry)	KCNC	L 0–7	76,359	
November 19	Kansas State		Folsom Field; Boulder, CO (rivalry)	KCNC	W 56–14	32,617	
December 29	vs. BYU*		Anaheim Stadium; Anaheim, CA (Freedom Bowl)	Raycom	L 17–20	35,941	
*Non-conference game; ^{†}Homecoming; Rankings from AP Poll released prior to the game

== Games summaries ==
=== At Iowa ===
Colorado at #19 Iowa

Team	1	2	3	4	Total
• Colorado	14	0	3	7	24
Iowa	0	14	7	0	21

- Date: September 17
- Location: Kinnick Stadium
  Iowa City, Iowa
- Game attendance: 67,700

Scoring summary
Q1	5:28	COL	Flannigan 5 yard run (Hannah kick)	COL 7–0
Q1	2:20	COL	Aunese 17 yard run (Hannah kick)	COL 14–0
Q2	6:44	IOWA	Hanks 8 yard blocked punt return (Skillett kick)	COL 14–7
Q2	2:42	IOWA	Hudson 3 yard run (Skillett kick)	Tie 14–14
Q3	9:13	COL	Hannah 28 yard field goal	COL 17–14
Q3	3:20	IOWA	Ward 19 yard pass from Hartlieb (Skillett kick)	IOWA 21–17
Q4	1:55	COL	Aunese 1 yard run (Hannah kick)	COL 24–21

=== Oklahoma ===
#8 Oklahoma Sooners (5–1) at Colorado Buffaloes (5–1)

Quarter	1	2	3	4	Total
Oklahoma	7	7	0	3	17
Colorado	6	8	0	0	14

at Folsom Field, Boulder, Colorado

- Date: October 22, 1989
- Game time: 8:00 p.m. EDT
- Game attendance: 49,716
- TV announcers (ESPN): Chris Fowler

External videos
- Full game

Scoring summary

Quarter	Time	Drive			Team	Scoring information	Score	
Quarter	Time	Plays	Yards	TOP	Team	Scoring information	OU	CU
1					Oklahoma	Charles Thompson 11-yard touchdown run, R.D. Lashar kick good	7	0
1					Colorado	35-yard field goal by Ken Culbertson	7	3
1					Colorado	26-yard field goal by Ken Culbertson	7	6
2					Colorado	Eric Bieniemy 24-yard touchdown run, 2-point pass good	7	14
2					Oklahoma	Anthony Stafford 2-yard touchdown run, R.D. Lashar kick good	14	14
4	8:15	14	71		Oklahoma	22-yard field goal by R.D. Lashar	17	14
"TOP" = time of possession. For other American football terms, see Glossary of American football.							17	14

=== At Nebraska ===
No. 19 Colorado at No. 7 Nebraska

Team	1	2	3	4	Total
Colorado	0	0	0	0	0
• Nebraska	0	0	7	0	7

- Date: November 12
- Location: Memorial Stadium, Lincoln, Nebraska
- Game attendance: 76,359

== Roster ==
1988 Colorado Buffaloes football team roster
Players
Coaches
Offense

Pos.	#	Name	Class
QB		Sal Aunese
RB	1	Eric Bieniemy	So
WR		Jeff Campbell
RB		J.J. Flannigan
QB		Darian Hagan
RB		George Hemingway
QB		Charles S. Johnson
WR		Eric Kissick
TE		John Perak
WR		Mike Pritchard

Defense

Pos.	#	Name	Class
LB		Don DeLuzio
DB		Deon Figures
LB		Kanavis McGhee

Special teams

Pos.	#	Name	Class
K		Pat Biottiaux
K		Ken Culbertson
P		Keith English
K		Eric Hannah
P		Mark Henry

Head coach

- Bill McCartney

Coordinators/assistant coaches

Legend

- (C) Team captain
- (S) Suspended
- (I) Ineligible
- Injured
- Redshirt
