= Wishbone formation =

American football formation

A variant of the wishbone formation with two wide receivers (WR). The basic wishbone has one tight end and one wide receiver.

The wishbone formation, also known simply as the bone, is an offensive formation in American football. The style of attack to which it gives rise is known as the wishbone offense. Like the spread offense in the 2000s to the present, the wishbone was considered to be the most productive and innovative offensive scheme in college football during the 1970s and 1980s.

== History ==
While the record books commonly refer to Emory Bellard developing the wishbone formation in 1968 as offensive coordinator at Texas, the wishbone's roots can be traced back to the 1950s. According to Barry Switzer, it was Charles “Spud” Cason, football coach at William Monnig Junior High School of Fort Worth, Texas, who first modified the classic T formation in order “to get a slow fullback into the play quicker.” Cason called the formation “Monnig T.” Bellard learned about Cason's tactics while coaching at Breckenridge High School, a small community west of Fort Worth.

Earlier in his career Bellard saw a similar approach implemented by former Detroit Lions guard Ox Emerson, then head coach at Alice High School near Corpus Christi, Texas. Trying to avoid the frequent pounding of his offensive line, Emerson moved one of the starting guards into the backfield, enabling him to get a running start at the opposing defensive line. Bellard served as Emerson's assistant at that time. During his high school coaching career in the late '50s and early '60s, Bellard adopted the basic approaches of both Cason and Emerson, as he won two 3A Texas state championships for Breckenridge in 1958 and 1959 and a 4A state title at San Angelo Central High School in 1966, using a wishbone-like option offense.

In 1967 Bellard was hired by Darrell Royal and became offensive coordinator a year later. The Texas Longhorns only scored 18.6 points per game in a 6–4 season in 1967. After watching Texas A&M—running offensive coordinator Bud Moore and Gene Stallings' option offense—beat Bear Bryant's Alabama team in the 1968 Cotton Bowl Classic, Royal instructed Bellard to design a new three-man back-field triple option offense. Bellard tried to merge his old high school tactics with Stallings' triple option out of the Slot-I formation and Homer Rice's variations of the Veer, an offensive formation created by Bill Yeoman.

When Texas introduced the new offensive scheme at the beginning of the 1968 season, Houston Chronicle sportswriter Mickey Herskowitz stated it looked like a “pulley bone”; Royal agreed but changed the name to “wishbone”. Royal quickly embraced the idea of the wishbone, though it did not immediately work, as the Longhorns tied their first game running the new offense and went into halftime of their second game against Texas Tech trailing 21–0. This led Royal to make the first of two changes which proved key to the future success of the wishbone. He replaced initial starting quarterback Bill Bradley, who proved to have trouble with the reads and pitches that were key to the new formation, with James Street, who nearly led the Longhorns to a comeback win. Then, while analyzing film from the Texas Tech loss, an assistant noticed that fullback Steve Worster was reaching the line of scrimmage too soon. At the assistant's suggestion, Royal and Bellard then had Worster start a step farther back from the quarterback. According to Bradley, "When we moved Worster back and James took over, we just caught fire." Texas won its next 30 games, leading to two national championships using the formation. In 1971 Royal showed the offense to Bear Bryant, who was so enamored with it that he installed it at Alabama complete with his own touches.

Bellard later left Texas and – using the wishbone – guided Texas A&M and Mississippi State to bowl game appearances in the late 1970s. At Mississippi State Bellard “broke the bone” and introduced the “wing-bone”, moving one of the halfbacks up to a wing formation and frequently sending him in motion. Another variation of the wishbone formation is called the flexbone.

Ironically, the longest running wishbone offense was run not by Texas but by their arch-rivals, the University of Oklahoma, who ran variations of the wishbone well into the mid-1990s. Oklahoma coach Barry Switzer has been credited by some for having “perfected” the use of the wishbone offense and former OU quarterback Jack Mildren is often referred to as "the Godfather of the wishbone" by University of Oklahoma football fans. In 1971, the Oklahoma Sooners wishbone offense set the all-time NCAA single-season rushing record at 472.4 yards per game, a record which still stands to this day.

The wishbone's reliance on execution and discipline, along with its ability to eat up the game clock, make it a favorite of programs that routinely play opponents with superior size and speed, such as the three service academies. Air Force saw tremendous success running the option game out of the wishbone. In 1985, Air Force climbed to #2 in the country, just barely missing the national championship game, under head coach Fisher DeBerry. Army saw success using the wishbone under head coaches Jim Young and Bob Sutton in the 1980s and early 1990s, leading to the school's first four bowl appearances (10–6 win over Michigan State in the 1984 Cherry Bowl; 31–29 win over Illinois in the 1985 Peach Bowl; 29–28 loss to Alabama in the 1988 Sun Bowl; and a 32–29 loss to Auburn in the 1996 Independence Bowl) and the first of the program's two 10-win seasons.

Phil Jack Dawson, then head coach of Westbrook High School in Westbrook, Maine, developed an effective defense against the wishbone offense then in use by Texas, called “backbone defense”. Dawson contacted Ara Parseghian, then head coach of the University of Notre Dame, and convinced him to use it against Texas in the 1971 Cotton Bowl Classic. Notre Dame beat Texas 24-11, ending the Longhorns' 30-game winning streak.

In the National Football League, during the strike season of 1987, the San Francisco 49ers used the wishbone successfully against the New York Giants to win 41–21. Coach Bill Walsh used the wishbone because of his replacement quarterback's familiarity with a similar formation in college. The Cleveland Browns also utilized the wishbone at the pro level in a 2018 28–16 win over the Atlanta Falcons.

While run-based option offenses, including the wishbone, are as of 2022 now used only by a small number of NCAA Division I programs—mainly the service academies—wishbone principles still influence college football to this day. The original architects of the pass-oriented Air Raid offense, Mike Leach and Hal Mumme, explicitly employed wishbone principles in the offense's creation. In a 2018 ESPN story, Ken Niumatalolo, then head coach of Navy, noted that modern spread option offenses also conceptually borrow from the wishbone. Some coaches are convinced that the wishbone could still work in the modern college game. One of them is Switzer, who in the aforementioned ESPN piece specifically named 2016 Heisman Trophy winner Lamar Jackson as a quarterback who would be "perfect in the Wishbone", adding, "There's a lot of them [quarterbacks that could run the formation] out there, with the great speed and quickness that can also throw the football. They're out there by the dozens. They're just playing different positions." In the same piece, Leach said, "Nobody has ever truly stopped the Wishbone. There's a point to where people have lost interest in the Wishbone. But nobody ever really successfully stopped it."

== Athletes required ==
The Oklahoma playbook describes the quarterback, the architect behind the Wishbone, as, "a running back who can throw." They must also have an aptitude for the option and the decision making that lies within the play design as well as durability (cannot miss a practice).

The fullback is required to be able to handle a physical pounding because he is frequently hit without having the ball; he must also be quick with excellent stamina, and be a good blocker.

== Running the wishbone offense ==
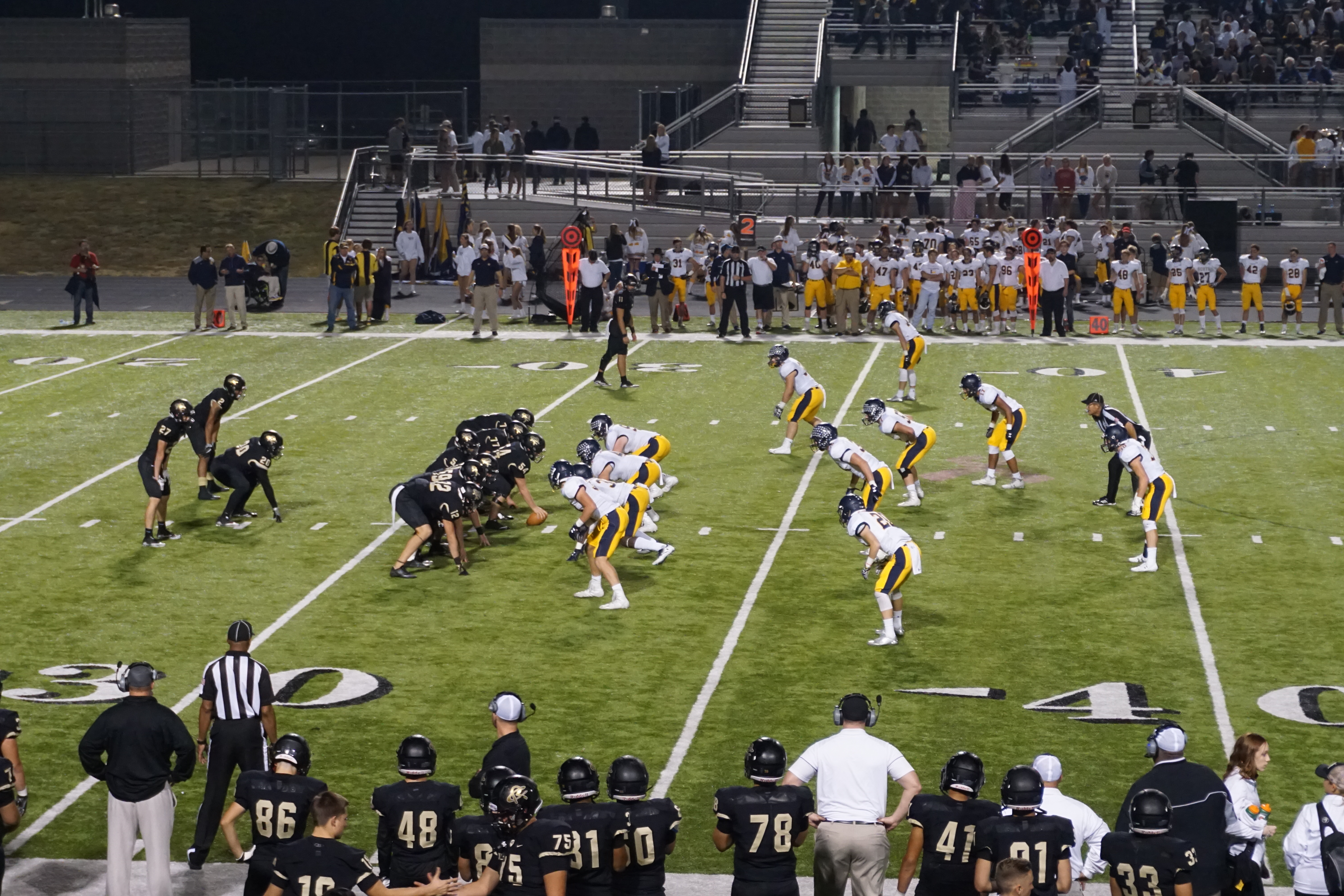
Royse City High School running the wishbone against Highland Park

The wishbone was designed to run a triple-option with a lead blocker. The purpose of an option is to eliminate one defender without blocking him. Ideally, the defender must make a choice to eliminate one of two offensive players. This is a double option. This option offensive scheme forces a defender to choose one of two offensive players who can advance the ball and then allows the other offensive player to carry the ball, making whatever choice the defender made the "wrong" choice. Because of this aspect of the defensive player taking himself out of the play by his choice, the offensive player that would otherwise block that defensive player can now block a different defender, placing severe pressure on the defense to cover the dive, the quarterback run, the pitch or the pass to a receiver.

The triple-option, then, eliminates two defenders without blocking them. This frees two offensive linemen to block different defenders, usually inside defenders. This isolates the dive key and the pitch key for the QB to "read" and should leave only an outside support defender (usually a safety) and the cornerback to cover the End, who is running a deep pass route. As Pepper Rodgers and Homer Smith stated in "Installing Football's Wishbone T Offense", "To run a Triple Option with a lead blocker is the reason for the Wishbone formation." It is the "extra blocker" concept that drives the success of the wishbone and its derivatives. The cornerback must cover the outside receiver. The support/safety must support the run defense and (usually) covers the pitch back. The defensive end typically attacks the quarterback and a defensive tackle is assigned the fullback dive. These assignments must be made before the play begins and that totals eight defensive players to both sides of the ball.

As stated above, however, the offense now has linemen that can be released to block other defenders, usually inside. The play is designed to handle five defenders on either side of the ball. Thus, the defender least able to affect the play, the offside cornerback or deep safety, is not blocked by design. The offensive linemen, now free to block inside, can block the first down lineman to the playside and the first linebacker to the playside. Emory Bellard once said, "If the threat of the fullback can be applied to the defense, the offense is sound.". Then, the lead back principle takes over. The lead back can block the defensive end or the safety and there is then a one-on-none possibility for the offensive player with the ball. In order to stop this attack, the defense must defeat blocks or flow defenders to the playside.

This makes the wishbone a "complete" offense. The offense expects to get a one-on-none in the running game and a one-on-one in open space with the passing game. The safety, who must support the run and also defend against the pass, is under tremendous pressure in this attack. The basic wishbone triple option play accounts for every defender on the field. Every defender is threatened before the basic play begins. There is an invitation to overplay or compensate on the basic play and overplaying or making a misstep on the basic play leaves the defense open for counters that leave no one to make up for the mistake.

The wishbone has the quarterback taking the snap from under center, with a fullback close behind him, and two halfbacks (sometimes called tailbacks) further back, one slightly to the left, and the other slightly to the right. The alignment of the four backs makes an inverted Y, or “wishbone”, shape. There is typically one wide receiver and one tight end, but sometimes two wide receivers, or two tight ends.

The wishbone was designed to facilitate a running, option offense. It allows the quarterback to easily run the triple option to either side of the line. The quarterback first reads the defensive tackle or linebacker who is unblocked. As he reads the tackle/linebacker, he rides the ball in the fullback's gut. If the defensive tackle/linebacker looks to tackle the fullback the quarterback pulls the ball out and runs down the line to his next option read, usually the defensive end/outside linebacker. If the end/linebacker looks to tackle the quarterback, the ball is pitched to the trailing halfback. The lead halfback is a lead blocker usually looking to block the outside defensive player, a safety or corner. The tight end to the option side 'arc' releases to block the safety.

=== Teams using wishbone ===
- 1968 Texas Longhorns [9–1–1]
- 1969 Texas Longhorns [11–0] AP and UPI national champions
- 1970 Texas Longhorns [11–1] UPI national champions
- 1971 Alabama Crimson Tide [11–1]
- 1971 Oklahoma Sooners [11–1] 4 players ran for over 625 yards
- 1971 Texas Longhorns [8–3]
- 1972 Alabama Crimson Tide [10–2]
- 1972 Oklahoma Sooners [11–1] 8 players ran for over 240 yards
- 1972 Purdue Boilermakers [6–5] Ran for 2,592 Yards
- 1972 Texas Longhorns [10–1]
- 1972 UCLA Bruins [8–3]
- 1973 Alabama Crimson Tide [11–1] UPI national champions
- 1973 Oklahoma Sooners [10–0–1] 3 players ran for over 880 yards
- 1973 Purdue Boilermakers [5–6] Ran for 2,124 Yards
- 1973 Texas Longhorns [8–3]
- 1973 UCLA Bruins [9–2]
- 1974 Army Black Knights [3–8]
- 1974 Florida Gators [8–4] 4 players ran for over 398 yards
- 1974 Georgia Tech Yellow Jackets [6-5]
- 1974 Oklahoma Sooners [11–0] AP national champions; 6 players ran for over 375 yards
- 1974 Texas Longhorns [8–4]
- 1974 Texas A&M Aggies [8–3]
- 1975 Florida Gators [9–3] 5 players ran for over 244 yards
- 1975 Georgia Tech Yellow Jackets [7-4]
- 1975 Kansas Jayhawks [7–5] defeated Oklahoma 23-3, the Sooners' first loss under coach Barry Switzer, who was 28-0-1 to that point
- 1975 Oklahoma Sooners [11–1] AP and UPI national champions; 6 players ran for over 322 yards
- 1975 Texas Longhorns [10–2]
- 1975 Texas A&M Aggies [10–2]
- 1976 Florida Gators [8–4] 6 players ran for over 233 yards
- 1976 Georgia Tech Yellow Jackets [4-6-1] Defeated No. 11 Notre Dame 23-14 without attempting a forward pass
- 1976 Holy Cross Crusaders [3–8]
- 1976 Kansas Jayhawks [6–5]
- 1976 Kentucky Wildcats [8–4] 4 players ran for over 504 yards
- 1976 Oklahoma Sooners [9–2–1] 5 players ran for over 443 yards
- 1976 Texas A&M Aggies [10–2]
- 1977 Florida Gators [6–4–1] 4 players ran for over 353 yards
- 1977 Holy Cross Crusaders [2–9]
- 1977 Kansas Jayhawks [3–7–1]
- 1977 Kentucky Wildcats [10–1] 5 players ran for over 338 yards
- 1977 Oklahoma Sooners [10–2] 5 players ran for over 354 yards
- 1977 Pennsylvania Quakers [5–4]
- 1978 Oklahoma Sooners [11–1] 4 players ran for over 408 yards
- 1979 Kentucky Wildcats [5–6] 3 players ran for over 460 yards
- 1979 Mississippi State Bulldogs [3–8] 4 players ran for over 378 yards
- 1979 Oklahoma Sooners [11–1] 4 players ran for over 358 yards
- 1980 Mississippi State Bulldogs [9–3] 4 players ran for over 438 yards
- 1980 Oklahoma Sooners [10–2] 7 players ran for over 292 yards
- 1981 Air Force Falcons [4–7] 5 players ran for over 235 yards
- 1981 Auburn Tigers [5–6] 3 players ran for over 442 yards
- 1981 Mississippi State Bulldogs [8–4] 4 players ran for over 258 yards
- 1981 Oklahoma Sooners [7–4–1] 3 players ran for over 442 yards
- 1982 Air Force Falcons [8–5] 5 players ran for over 404 yards
- 1982 Auburn Tigers [9–3] 4 players ran for over 284 yards
- 1982 Mississippi State Bulldogs [5–6] 5 players ran for over 349 yards
- 1982 Oklahoma Sooners [8–4] 4 players ran for over 621 yards
- 1983 Air Force Falcons [10–2] 3 players ran for over 767 yards
- 1983 Auburn Tigers [11–1] 3 players ran for over 604 yards
- 1983 Mississippi State Bulldogs [3–8] 6 players ran for over 232 yards
- 1983 Oklahoma Sooners [8–4] 4 players ran for over 369 yards
- 1984 Air Force Falcons [8–4] 6 players ran for over 232 yards
- 1984 Army Black Knights [8–3–1]
- 1984 Auburn Tigers [9–4] 5 players ran for over 299 yards
- 1984 Mississippi State Bulldogs [4–7] 6 players ran for over 234 yards
- 1984 Oklahoma Sooners [9–2–1] 4 players ran for over 465 yards
- 1985 Air Force Falcons [12–1] 4 players ran for over 492 yards
- 1985 Army Black Knights [9–3]
- 1985 Colorado Buffaloes [7–5] 5 players ran for over 269 yards
- 1985 Oklahoma Sooners [11–1] 7 players ran for over 240 yards
- 1985 Wyoming Cowboys [3–8]
- 1986 Air Force Falcons [6–5] 4 players ran for over 275 yards
- 1986 Army Black Knights [6–5]
- 1986 Colorado Buffaloes [6–6] 4 players ran for over 224 yards
- 1986 Oklahoma Sooners [11–1] 9 players ran for over 283 yards
- 1987 Air Force Falcons [9–4] 6 players ran for over 384 yards
- 1987 Army Black Knights [5–6]
- 1987 Colorado Buffaloes [7–4] 6 players ran for over 332 yards
- 1987 Michigan Wolverines [8–4]
- 1987 Missouri Tigers [5–6] 3 players ran for over 552 yards
- 1987 Navy Midshipmen [2–9]
- 1987 Oklahoma Sooners [11–1] 6 players ran for over 683 yards
- 1988 Air Force Falcons [5–7] 5 players ran for over 576 yards
- 1988 Army Black Knights [9–3]
- 1988 Colorado Buffaloes [8–4] 5 players ran for over 257 yards
- 1988 Michigan Wolverines [9–2–1]
- 1988 Missouri Tigers [3–7–1] 5 players ran for over 242 yards
- 1988 Navy Midshipmen [3–8]
- 1988 Oklahoma Sooners [9–3] 6 players ran for over 308 yards
- 1989 Air Force Falcons [8–4–1] 3 players ran for over 703 yards
- 1989 Army Black Knights [6–5]
- 1989 Colorado Buffaloes [11–1] 6 players ran for over 213 yards
- 1989 Michigan Wolverines [10–2]
- 1989 Navy Midshipmen [3–8]
- 1989 Oklahoma Sooners [7–4]
- 1989 Yale Bulldogs [8–2]
- 1990 Air Force Falcons [7–5] 5 players ran for over 228 yards
- 1990 Army Black Knights [6–5]
- 1990 Colorado Buffaloes [11–1–1] 4 players ran for over 325 yards
- 1990 Oklahoma Sooners [8–3] 6 players ran for over 262 yards
- 1990 Yale Bulldogs [6–4]
- 1991 Air Force Falcons [10–3] 6 players ran for over 353 yards
- 1991 Army Black Knights [4–7]
- 1991 Colorado Buffaloes [8–3–1] 4 players ran for over 301 yards
- 1991 Yale Bulldogs [6–4]
- 1992 Air Force Falcons [7–5] 6 players ran for over 310 yards
- 1992 Army Black Knights [5–6]
- 1993 Air Force Falcons [4–8] 6 players ran for over 301 yards
- 1993 Army Black Knights [6–5]
- 1993 Oregon State Beavers [4–7] 5 players ran for over 338 yards
- 1994 Air Force Falcons [8–4] 6 players ran for over 435 yards
- 1994 Army Black Knights [4–7]
- 1994 Oregon State Beavers [4–7] 5 players ran for over 295 yards
- 1995 Army Black Knights [5–5–1]
- 1995 Oregon State Beavers [1–10] 6 players ran for over 251 yards
- 1996 Army Black Knights [10–2] 7 players ran for over 229 yards
- 1996 Oregon State Beavers [2–9] 4 players ran for over 387 yards
- 1997 Army Black Knights [4–7]
- 1998 Army Black Knights [3–8]
- 1999 Army Black Knights [3–8]
- 2018 Army Black Knights [11–2]
