= 1988 Iowa State Cyclones football team =

American college football season

1988 Iowa State Cyclones football
- Conference: Big Eight Conference
- Record: 5–6 (3–4 Big 8)
- Head coach: Jim Walden (2nd season)
- Defensive coordinator: Robin Ross (2nd season)
- Home stadium: Cyclone Stadium

1988 Big Eight Conference football standings
	Conf.					Overall
Team	W		L		T	W		L		T
No. 10 Nebraska $	7	–	0	–	0	11	–	2	–	0
No. 14 Oklahoma	6	–	1	–	0	9	–	3	–	0
No. 11 Oklahoma State	5	–	2	–	0	10	–	2	–	0
Colorado	4	–	3	–	0	8	–	4	–	0
Iowa State	3	–	4	–	0	5	–	6	–	0
Missouri	2	–	5	–	0	3	–	7	–	1
Kansas	1	–	6	–	0	1	–	10	–	0
Kansas State	0	–	7	–	0	0	–	11	–	0
$ – Conference champion; Rankings from AP Poll

The 1988 Iowa State Cyclones football team represented Iowa State University as a member of the Big Eight Conference during the 1988 NCAA Division I-A football season. Led by second-year head coach Jim Walden, the Cyclones compiled an overall record of 5–6 with a mark of 3–4 in conference play, placing fifth in the Big 8. Iowa State played home games at Cyclone Stadium in Ames, Iowa.

== Schedule ==
Date	Time	Opponent	Site	TV	Result	Attendance	Source
September 10	6:00 p.m.	Tulane*	Cyclone Stadium; Ames, IA		W 30–13	41,780	
September 17	Noon	Baylor*	Cyclone Stadium; Ames, IA		L 0–35	42,913	
September 24	11:00 a.m.	at Iowa*	Kinnick Stadium; Iowa City, IA (rivalry)	ABC	L 3–10	67,700	
October 1	1:30 p.m.	at No. 10 Oklahoma	Oklahoma Memorial Stadium; Norman, OK		L 7–35	75,004	
October 8	1:00 p.m.	Northern Iowa*	Cyclone Stadium; Ames, IA		W 20–17	46,219	
October 15	1:30 p.m.	at Missouri	Faurot Field; Columbia, MO (rivalry)		W 21–3	43,206	
October 22	1:00 p.m.	Kansas^{†}	Cyclone Stadium; Ames, IA		W 42–14	43,180	
October 29	1:00 p.m.	at Colorado	Folsom Field; Boulder, CO		L 12–24	37,241	
November 5	1:00 p.m.	No. 7 Nebraska	Cyclone Stadium; Ames, IA (rivalry)		L 16–51	50,158	
November 12	1:30 p.m.	at Kansas State	KSU Stadium; Manhattan, KS (rivalry)		W 16–7	10,850	
November 19	1:00 p.m.	No. 13 Oklahoma State	Cyclone Stadium; Ames, IA		L 28–49	38,163	
*Non-conference game; ^{†}Homecoming; Rankings from AP Poll released prior to the game; All times are in Central time

== Game summaries ==
=== At Iowa ===
Iowa State at Iowa

Team	1	2	3	4	Total
Cyclones	0	3	0	0	3
• Hawkeyes	0	3	7	0	10

- Date: September 24
- Location: Kinnick Stadium, Iowa City, Iowa
- Game start: 11:15 a.m. CDT
- Elapsed time: 3:00
- Game attendance: 67,700
- Game weather: 76 °F (24 °C), Sunny, Wind SW 7–10 mph (11–16 km/h)
- Referee: Tom Quinn

Scoring summary
2	13:04	IOWA	Skillett 32-yard field goal	IOWA 3–0
2	0:46	ISU	Shudak 40-yard field goal	Tied 3–3
3	6:06	IOWA	Stewart 26-yard pass from Hartlieb (Skillett kick)	IOWA 10–3

=== At Oklahoma ===
Iowa State Cyclones (1–2) at #10 Oklahoma Sooners (2–1)

Quarter	1	2	3	4	Total
Iowa St	0	7	0	0	7
Oklahoma	14	7	14	0	35

at Oklahoma Memorial Stadium, Norman, Oklahoma

- Date: October 1, 1988
- Game attendance: 75,004

Game information

First quarter

- OU – Anthony Stafford 10-yard run (pass failed). Oklahoma 6–0.
- OU – Rotnei Anderson 5-yard run (run good). Oklahoma 14–0.

Second quarter

- ISU – Mike Busch 2-yard pass from Brent Oberg (Jeff Shudak kick). Oklahoma 14–7.
- OU – Carl Cabbiness 12-yard pass from Jamelle Holieway (R.D. Lashar kick). Oklahoma 21–7.

Third quarter

- OU – Eric Bross 13-yard pass from Jamelle Holieway (R.D. Lashar kick). Oklahoma 28–7.
- OU – Leon Perry 25-yard run (R.D. Lashar kick). Oklahoma 35–7.

Fourth quarter

- No scoring

Top passers

- ISU – Brent Oberg – 10/17, 68 yards, TD
- OU – Jamelle Holieway – 5/5, 113 yards, 2 TD

Top rushers

- ISU – Joe Henderson – 26 rushes, 75 yards
- OU – Charles Thompson – 9 rushes, 85 yards

Top receivers

- ISU – Eddie Brown – 2 receptions, 43 yards
- OU – Eric Bross – 2 receptions, 43 yards, TD

=== Nebraska ===
Nebraska at Iowa State

Team	1	2	3	4	Total
• Cornhuskers	7	24	7	13	51
Cyclones	0	0	3	13	16

- Date: November 5
- Location: Cyclone Stadium, Ames, Iowa
- Game attendance: 35,000

== Roster ==
1988 Iowa State Cyclones football team roster
Players
Coaches
Offense

Pos.	#	Name	Class
WR	1	Eddie Brown	Sr
TE	85	Mike Busch	Jr
QB	19	Derek DeGennaro	Sr
WR	81	John Glotfelty	So
RB	33	Joe Henderson	Sr
C	66	David Heyn	Sr
RB		Edwin Jones
TE		Craig Mahoney
OL		Ben Mitchell
OL	62	Rich Moore	Sr
WR	7	Troy Moore	So
RB	4	Sylvester Nickerson	Jr
QB	16	Brent Oberg	Jr
QB	5	Craig Pedersen	Fr
RB		Gary Pedersen
WR		Dennis Rose
G	69	Keith Sims	Jr
RB	31	Paul Thibodeaux	Jr
OL	54	Trent Van Hoosen	Jr
RB		Curtis Warren
OL		Rick Wells
RB		Ron Wilkinson
OL	72	Gene Williams	So

Defense

Pos.	#	Name	Class
DB	29	Tim Baker	Jr
DB	23	Adam Beck	So
DL		Randy Bern
DL		Travis Block
DB	27	Ray Carreathers	Sr
LB		John Cinfero
LB		Tyrone Davis
DB	41	Jeff Dole	Sr
DL	43	Don Edwards	Jr
DL		Mark Foley
LB		Anthony Hoskins
LB		Robert Lendino
DL		Alan Patten
DL		Matt Rehberg
DB	11	Marcus Robertson	So
LB	45	Mike Shane	Sr

Special teams

Pos.	#	Name	Class
P		Judge Johnston
K		Jeff Shudak

Head coach

- Jim Walden

Coordinators/assistant coaches

Legend

- (C) Team captain
- (S) Suspended
- (I) Ineligible
- Injured
- Redshirt
