= 1989 Florida Citrus Bowl =

American college football game

Clemson Tigers	Oklahoma Sooners
(9–2)	(9–2)
ACC	Big Eight
13	6
Head coach: Danny Ford	Head coach: Barry Switzer
AP / Coaches; 13 / 13	AP / Coaches; 10 / 10
	1	2	3	4	Total
Clemson	0	6	0	7	13
Oklahoma	3	0	3	0	6
- Date: January 2, 1989
- Season: 1988
- Stadium: Florida Citrus Bowl
- Location: Orlando, Florida
- MVP: Terry Allen, RB, Clemson
- Referee: Dick Burleson (SEC)
- Attendance: 53,571

United States TV coverage
- Network: ABC
- Announcers: Gary Bender and Dick Vermeil

The 1989 Florida Citrus Bowl was held on January 2, 1989 at the Florida Citrus Bowl in Orlando, Florida. The #13 Clemson Tigers defeated the #10 Oklahoma Sooners by a score of 13–6.

== Game summary ==
The scoring was opened by the Sooners, who converted a 35-yard field goal attempt to lead 3-0 after the first quarter. The second quarter saw Clemson strike back, as the Tigers made two field goal attempts: from 20 yards and then from 46 yards. The Tigers led at halftime, 6–3. The third quarter finished identical to the first, with the only scoring coming from an Oklahoma field goal, this time from 30 yards out. The fourth quarter began with Clemson and Oklahoma tied 6–6, but the Tigers broke the deadlock and MVP Terry Allen found the end zone from 4 yards out and scored the only touchdown of the game and what proved to be the only points of the fourth quarter. With that touchdown, the Tigers secured a second Florida Citrus Bowl victory in two years, winning 13–6.

== Aftermath ==
With both teams scoring 19 points combined, the game proved to be the lowest-scoring Florida Citrus Bowl since #17 Ohio State and #19 BYU met three years prior in the 1985 Florida Citrus Bowl. The first quarter, which contained three points combined, was the lowest-scoring opening quarter since the same 1985 game, whose first quarter did not contain any scoring. Furthermore, the first half, which contained nine points combined, was the lowest-scoring first half in a Florida Citrus Bowl since the 1973 Tangerine Bowl between Miami (OH) and Florida, whose score was 3–0 at halftime (the bowl game's name was changed from the Tangerine Bowl to the Florida Citrus Bowl in 1983).

After the game, #13 Clemson finished at #9 in the polls due to their victory, and #10 Oklahoma finished at #14.

This turned out to be the final game for Barry Switzer as Oklahoma's coach. The Sooner program was rocked later in January when four players were arrested and charged with rape in the university's athletic dormitory. In February, quarterback Charles Thompson was arrested on drug-related charges. The program's woes were the subject of a Sports Illustrated cover story in its February 27, 1989 issue.

The NCAA placed Oklahoma on probation in June, banning the Sooners from appearing on television in 1989, and from appearing in a bowl game in 1989 and 1990. Switzer. who led Oklahoma to national championships in 1974, 1975 and 1985, resigned on June 19 after 16 seasons as head coach, during which time he compiled a 157-29-4 record. Prior to becoming head coach, Switzer was a Sooner assistant under Jim Mackenzie and Chuck Fairbanks.
