= Nate Turner =

American football player (born 1969)

No. 21, 32
- Positions: Running back, tight end

Personal information
- Born: May 28, 1969 (age 57); Chicago, Illinois, U.S.
- Listed height: 6 ft 1 in (1.85 m)
- Listed weight: 255 lb (116 kg)

Career information
- High school: Mt. Carmel (Chicago)
- College: Nebraska
- NFL draft: 1992: 6th round, 167th overall pick

Career history
- Buffalo Bills (1992–1994); Carolina Panthers (1995)

Career NFL statistics
- Rushing yards: 40
- Rushing average: 3.1
- Receptions: 1
- Receiving yards: 26
- Total touchdowns: 1
- Stats at Pro Football Reference

Nate Turner (born May 28, 1969) is an American former professional football player who was a tight end for the Buffalo Bills and Carolina Panthers of the National Football League (NFL). He played college football for the Nebraska Cornhuskers and was selected by the Bills in the sixth round of the 1992 NFL draft.

In 1997, Turner represented the United States in rugby league at the World Sevens tournament in Sydney, Australia, with his size, speed and history in the NFL making him a major part of the event's promotions. He is currently running Nate Turner Receiving Academy in Chicago.

== Personal life ==
Turner has a daughter, Reilyn Turner, who is a professional soccer player for the Portland Thorns.
