= Tommie Stowers =

American football player (born 1966)

No. 37, 49, 47, 89
- Positions: Fullback, tight end

Personal information
- Born: November 18, 1966 (age 59); Kansas City, Missouri, U.S.
- Listed height: 6 ft 3 in (1.91 m)
- Listed weight: 240 lb (109 kg)

Career information
- High school: Hickman Mills (Kansas City)
- College: Missouri
- NFL draft: 1990: 11th round, 283rd overall pick

Career history
- San Diego Chargers (1990)*; Orlando Thunder (1991-1992); Kansas City Chiefs (1992)*; New Orleans Saints (1992–1993); Houston Oilers (1994); Kansas City Chiefs (1994); Rhein Fire (1996)
- * Offseason or practice squad member only

Career NFL statistics
- Receptions: 4
- Receiving yards: 23
- Stats at Pro Football Reference

Tommie D. Stowers Jr. (born November 18, 1966) is an American former professional football player who was a tight end in the National Football League (NFL) for the New Orleans Saints and Kansas City Chiefs. He played college football for the Missouri Tigers

Stowers grew up in Kansas City, Missouri, and attended Hickman Mills High School. He played college football at the University of Missouri, playing fullback. As a sophomore in 1987, he rushed for 707 yards on 151 carries. Stowers rushed for 667 yards on 143 carries the following year. As a senior in 1989, Stowers had 547 yards and six touchdowns. He finished second on the team in receptions with 28 for 268 yards. Stowers was selected by the San Diego Chargers in the eleventh round with the 283rd overall pick. He earned a degree in marketing.

Stowers joined the Orlando Thunder of the World League of American Football (WLAF) in the 1991 season. He changed positions to tight end and rushed for 167 yards and one touchdown while receiving 156 yards. The following year, he signed with the New Orleans Saints and played in 12 games, catching four passes for 23 yards. He played in four games with the Saints in 1993 but did not record any statistics. In 1994, Stowers joined the Kansas City Chiefs and played in one game without catching and passes or rushing for any yards. In 1996, he signed with the Orlando Predators of the Arena Football League but never played. He played with the Rhein Fire of the WLAF in 1996.
