= Hart Lee Dykes =

American football player (born 1966)

No. 88
- Position: Wide receiver

Personal information
- Born: September 2, 1966 (age 60); Bay City, Texas, U.S.
- Listed height: 6 ft 4 in (1.93 m)
- Listed weight: 218 lb (99 kg)

Career information
- High school: Bay City
- College: Oklahoma State
- NFL draft: 1989: 1st round, 16th overall pick

Career history
- New England Patriots (1989–1990)

Awards and highlights
- Consensus All-American (1988); 3× First-team All-Big Eight (1986, 1987, 1988)

Career NFL statistics
- Receptions: 83
- Receiving yards: 1,344
- Touchdowns: 7
- Stats at Pro Football Reference

Hart Lee Dykes Jr. (born September 2, 1966) is an American former professional football player who was a wide receiver for two seasons with the New England Patriots of the National Football League (NFL). He played college football for the Oklahoma State Cowboys, earning consensus All-American honors in 1988. Dykes was selected in the first round of the 1989 NFL draft with the 16th overall pick. His career was cut short when he fractured his kneecap and because of an eye injury which occurred during a bar room fight that also involved teammate Irving Fryar in 1990. He was also drafted into the Chicago White Sox minor league system in 1989.

== Background ==
He was the winner of the Pitch, Hit and Run competition as a 10-year-old. He was honored at the 1977 MLB All-Star Game. Dykes played high school basketball with LaBradford Smith, and the duo led their high school, Bay City, to the 4A State Championship in 1985. He was also part of his high school's track team, which won a state championship in 1984. He was awarded the Dial Award as the national high school scholar-athlete of the year in 1984.

== Playing career ==
At OSU, he was a member of a talented offense with Mike Gundy at quarterback and Thurman Thomas and later, Barry Sanders at running back. Dykes was selected in the first round (16th pick) of the 1989 NFL draft. In two seasons with the Patriots, Dykes caught 83 passes for 1,344 yards and seven touchdowns.

== NFL career statistics ==
Legend
**Bold**	Career high

Year	Team	Games		Receiving				
Year	Team	GP	GS	Rec	Yds	Avg	Lng	TD
1989	NWE	**16**	6	**49**	**795**	**16.2**	**42**	**5**
1990	NWE	10	**10**	34	549	16.1	35	2
		26	16	83	1,344	16.2	42	7

== Post-playing career ==
As of 2002, Dykes was the owner of a trucking company in Sugar Land, Texas.

== Philanthropy ==
Dykes is a major advocate for charities such as the Jimmy Fund and Autism Awareness.
