= Charles Thompson (American football) =

American businessman, motivational speaker, and former football player

No. 6
- Position: Quarterback

Personal information
- Born: May 28, 1968 (age 58); Lawton, Oklahoma, U.S.
- Listed height: 5 ft 9 in (1.75 m)
- Listed weight: 185 lb (84 kg)

Career information
- High school: Lawton (Lawton, Oklahoma)
- College: Oklahoma (1986–1988); Central State (OH) (1992)

Charles Thompson (born May 28, 1968) is an American businessman, motivational speaker, and former football player, best known for his tenure and spectacular downfall as the quarterback of the Oklahoma Sooners.

== Rise with the Sooners ==
Raised in Lawton, Oklahoma, Thompson proved to be a highly skilled athlete and was recruited by the University of Oklahoma, an NCAA Division I-A college football program, under head coach Barry Switzer. He was also selected by Major League Baseball's Cincinnati Reds in the 34th round of the 1986 MLB draft as a second baseman; however, he decided to focus on football. As a redshirt freshman, Thompson became the starting quarterback of the nationally ranked Sooners for the 1987 season. The highlight came on November 21, 1987, when Thompson led the offense of then No. 2-ranked Sooners to a 17-7 victory over the #1 Nebraska Cornhuskers in a game that was heavily hyped as the Game of the Century II. While the Sooners would drop their final game of the season in the 1988 Orange Bowl and finish 11–1, Thompson's status as a nationally famous collegiate athlete was confirmed.

During the 1988 season, Thompson, now a redshirt sophomore, led the Sooners to a 9–3 record. Thompson was a successful quarterback, named to the All-Big Eight Conference - 1st team. Off the field he was a celebrity, volunteering to speak to at-risk youth about how to succeed in the face of adversity and, the danger of illegal drugs.

== Downfall ==
=== Arrest ===
On January 26, 1989, the FBI videotaped Thompson selling 17 grams of cocaine for $1,400 to an undercover agent. On February 13, Thompson was arrested in Norman, Oklahoma and charged with dealing cocaine. He was released to his mother's custody on February 15, to await trial as Thompson waived his right to a preliminary hearing. In the meantime, the Sooners suspended him from the team.

=== Aftermath ===
A media frenzy followed the arrest, peaking when a notorious picture of the handcuffed Thompson in a prison jumpsuit appeared on the cover of the February 27, 1989 issue of Sports Illustrated, accompanied by accusations that the Switzer-led Sooners were out of control. Switzer's Sooners had already been under heavy public and media scrutiny before the incident as players had been arrested, in separate incidents, for assault with a deadly weapon and rape. With the national coverage brought by his star quarterback's arrest, Switzer resigned as head coach soon afterwards after leading the team for sixteen seasons.

=== Trial and prison ===
At his trial at a federal court in Oklahoma City, Thompson pleaded guilty, saying he knew he had done wrong and would take his punishment. The plea waived his rights to a jury trial and grand jury consideration of his case. He was convicted on April 26 of one count of conspiracy to distribute cocaine and sentenced on August 31 to two years in prison. He entered a federal prison in Big Spring, Texas on September 20, 1989.

While in prison, Thompson spoke out on the pressure and vices that can befall big-time college football. He was interviewed for ESPN by Chris Fowler, and, with Allan Sonnenschein, wrote the 1990 book Down and Dirty: The Life and Crimes of Oklahoma Football (ISBN 0-88184-623-6).

== After prison ==
=== Return to football ===
Although his sentence carried a maximum term of 27 months and a minimum term of 21, he was released after 17 months and transferred to Central State University, a historically black university located in Wilberforce, Ohio. He joined Central State's then-NAIA football team primarily as a running back, and helped them win the 1992 NAIA Division I Championship. As a 25-year-old junior, Thompson carried 200 times for 1,018 yards and five touchdowns and caught 29 passes for 439 yards and 7 touchdowns. He decided to forgo his senior year and enter the 1993 NFL draft; however, his past proved to be too great a risk for NFL teams, so he went undrafted and never played in the NFL.

Pre-draft measurables
Height	Weight	Arm length	Hand span	40-yard dash	10-yard split	20-yard split	Bench press
5 ft 9 in (1.75 m)	182 lb (83 kg)	29 1/4 in (0.74 m)	8 3/4 in (0.22 m)	4.69 s	1.66 s	2.73 s	6 reps

=== Post-football ===
With his football career over, Thompson completed his degree, reaffirmed his Christianity and married. He found success as a motivational speaker, and his turnaround was featured in a Sports Illustrated "Where are they now?" feature. His oldest son Kendal Thompson also played quarterback at University of Oklahoma before transferring to the University of Utah. He was instrumental in Utah's win over the #8 UCLA Bruins on October 4, 2014. In July 2016, Kendal signed a three-year contract as a wide receiver for the Washington Redskins. His middle son, Casey Thompson, played at the University of Texas from 2017 to 2021. After dealing with a hand injury between various starts during the 2021 season, he announced he would transfer to the University of Nebraska-Lincoln. On May 10, 2023, he transferred to Florida Atlantic University. On January 11, 2024, he announced his transfer to the University of Oklahoma for his final year of college eligibility. His youngest son is Cade Thompson, who played as a tight end at Southmoore High School.

Thompson currently resides in Oklahoma City.
