= 2003 Alabama Crimson Tide football team =

American college football season

2003 Alabama Crimson Tide football
- Conference: Southeastern Conference
- Western Division
- Record: 4–9 (2–6 SEC)
- Head coach: Mike Shula (1st season)
- Offensive coordinator: David Rader (1st season)
- Offensive scheme: Pro-style
- Defensive coordinator: Joe Kines (3rd season)
- Base defense: 3–3–5
- Captains: Derrick Pope; Shaud Williams
- Home stadium: Bryant–Denny Stadium; Legion Field

2003 Southeastern Conference football standings
	Conf.			Overall
Team	W		L	W		L
Eastern Division
No. 7 Georgia xy	6	–	2	11	–	3
No. 15 Tennessee x	6	–	2	10	–	3
No. 24 Florida x	6	–	2	8	–	5
South Carolina	2	–	6	5	–	7
Vanderbilt	1	–	7	2	–	10
Kentucky	1	–	7	4	–	8
Western Division
No. 2 LSU xy$#	7	–	1	13	–	1
No. 13 Ole Miss x	7	–	1	10	–	3
Auburn	5	–	3	8	–	5
Arkansas	4	–	4	9	–	4
Alabama	2	–	6	4	–	9
Mississippi State	1	–	7	2	–	10
Championship: LSU 34, Georgia 13
# – BCS National Champion; $ – BCS representative as conference champion; x – Division champion/co-champions; y – Championship game participant; Rankings from AP Poll

The 2003 Alabama Crimson Tide football team represented the University of Alabama as a member of the Southeastern Conference (SEC) during the 2003 NCAA Division I-A football season. Led by first-year head coach Mike Shula, the Crimson Tide compiled an overall record of 4–9 with a mark of 2–6 in conference play, placing fifth in the SEC's Western Division. To date, this is the last season in which Alabama had a losing record and failed to become bowl eligible. The team played home games at Bryant–Denny Stadium in Tuscaloosa, Alabama, and Legion Field in Birmingham, Alabama.

At the conclusion of the 2002 season, Dennis Franchione resigned as head coach and took the same position with Texas A&M. After a two-week-long coaching search, Washington State head coach Mike Price was hired as Franchione's replacement. Price then signed the 2003 recruiting class and led the Crimson Tide through spring practice. However, he was fired in May 2003 due to detrimental conduct as an employee of the university. Less than a week later, Mike Shula was hired as head coach of the Crimson Tide.

The Crimson Tide opened the season with what turned out to be their final game ever played at Legion Field with a victory over South Florida. After a loss to No. 1 Oklahoma in the second week of the season, the Crimson Tide entered the rankings at No. 21 following a victory over Kentucky. However, they dropped out the next week after being upset by Northern Illinois. They then lost to Arkansas and Georgia before they defeated Southern Miss on homecoming. Alabama then lost consecutive games to Ole Miss and then in five overtimes to Tennessee before they won at Mississippi State. The Crimson Tide then closed the season with losses to LSU, Auburn and Hawaii and finished with an overall record of 4–9.

== Schedule ==
The 2003 schedule was anomalous for a variety of reasons. With a two-year bowl ban imposed by the NCAA in 2002 through 2004, Alabama added 13th game against Hawaii in Honolulu to the 2002 and 2003 schedules that the university hoped to serve as an effective replacement for a bowl game. The 2003 season marked just the fifth time since 1947 that the Iron Bowl was not Alabama's final regular season game. With the exception of the 2002 game at Hawaii, all previous instances were postponements: the 2001 game vs. Southern Miss due to the September 11 attacks; the 1988 game at Texas A&M due to Hurricane Gilbert; and the 1963 game at Miami at request by CBS and later due to the assassination of John F. Kennedy.

Also beginning in 2003, the SEC altered its scheduling methodology—permanent cross-division opponents were reduced from two to one. Instead of Alabama playing Tennessee and Vanderbilt annually, the Tide would only face Tennessee every year while the Commodores would rotate onto Alabama's schedule along with the rest of the SEC Eastern Division teams. This change resulted in Alabama not playing Vanderbilt for the first time since 1952. Finally, the Crimson Tide played their final home game at Legion Field, which had hosted many Alabama games over the previous century, including the entire 1987 home schedule.

Date	Time	Opponent	Rank	Site	TV	Result	Attendance	Source
August 30	2:00 p.m.	South Florida*		Legion Field; Birmingham, AL	ESPN	W 40–17	76,780	
September 6	6:45 p.m.	No. 1 Oklahoma*		Bryant–Denny Stadium; Tuscaloosa, AL (College GameDay)	ESPN	L 13–20	83,818	
September 13	6:45 p.m.	Kentucky		Bryant–Denny Stadium; Tuscaloosa, AL	ESPN	W 27–17	83,818	
September 20	6:00 p.m.	Northern Illinois*	No. 21	Bryant–Denny Stadium; Tuscaloosa, AL	PPV	L 16–19	83,818	
September 27	2:30 p.m.	No. 9 Arkansas		Bryant–Denny Stadium; Tuscaloosa, AL	CBS	L 31–34 ^{2OT}	83,818	
October 4	2:30 p.m.	at No. 11 Georgia		Sanford Stadium; Athens, GA (rivalry)	CBS	L 23–37	92,058	
October 11	2:30 p.m.	Southern Miss*^{†}		Bryant–Denny Stadium; Tuscaloosa, AL	PPV	W 17–3	83,818	
October 18	11:30 a.m.	at Ole Miss		Vaught–Hemingway Stadium; Oxford, MS (rivalry)	JPS	L 28–43	60,825	
October 25	2:30 p.m.	No. 22 Tennessee		Bryant–Denny Stadium; Tuscaloosa, AL (Third Saturday in October)	CBS	L 43–51 ^{5OT}	83,818	
November 8	11:30 a.m.	at Mississippi State		Davis Wade Stadium; Starkville, MS (rivalry)	JPS	W 38–0	48,242	
November 15	6:45 p.m.	No. 3 LSU		Bryant–Denny Stadium; Tuscaloosa, AL (rivalry)	ESPN	L 3–27	83,818	
November 22	6:45 p.m.	at Auburn		Jordan–Hare Stadium; Auburn, AL (Iron Bowl)	ESPN	L 23–28	86,063	
November 29	6:45 p.m.	at Hawaii*		Aloha Stadium; Halawa, HI	ESPN	L 29–37	43,477	
*Non-conference game; ^{†}Homecoming; Rankings from AP Poll released prior to the game; All times are in Central time

== Before the season ==
=== NCAA sanctions ===
The 2003 season was impacted by sanctions imposed by the National Collegiate Athletic Association (NCAA) for violations that dated as far back as the late 1990s. On February 1, 2002, the NCAA imposed a two-year bowl ban, a reduction in athletic scholarships of 21 over a three-year period and five years of probation. The NCAA sanctioned the university after they found 11 major violations and five minor ones as part of their investigation that included boosters who provided players and coaches with improper benefits in violation of NCAA rules. On September 17, 2002, the NCAA rejected Alabama's appeal to reduce the severity of the sanctions. At that time, the NCAA stated they felt that the sanctions were appropriate and that it was only because of the cooperation of the university that the death penalty for the football program was not considered. As the appeal was denied, for the 2003 season Alabama saw a smaller recruiting class and was ineligible for both the 2003 SEC Championship Game and bowl games. The latter penalty would end up being meaningless due to the Tide going 4–9.

=== Franchione resignation ===
Late in the 2002 season, rumors were abound that head coach Dennis Franchione was going to resign from Alabama to take the head coaching position with Texas A&M. On December 2, 2002, A&M head coach R. C. Slocum was fired after he served 14 seasons in the position. Three days later, Franchione left Tuscaloosa and formally accepted the Aggies coaching vacancy on December 6.

=== Mike Price ===
Immediately after the resignation of Franchione, athletic director Mal Moore started the search for his replacement. In the week of December 9, South Florida head coach Jim Leavitt was interviewed and then New Orleans Saints assistant coach Mike Riley was actually offered the Alabama coaching position, which he later declined. After Riley turned down the position, Moore considered several other candidates. Included in the search were head coaches Les Miles of Oklahoma State, Rich Rodriguez of West Virginia and Mike Price of Washington State. On December 17, Price was officially named as the new head coach for the Crimson Tide. Price did not fully assume his duties as head coach until January 4, after he coached Washington State in the 2003 Rose Bowl.

==== Price's staff ====
In addition to completing the 2003 recruiting class, Price worked to assemble his staff in the weeks after he arrived in Tuscaloosa. Four of his assistants from Washington State came with Price to coach at Alabama: Chris Ball, Bob Connelly, Kasey Dunn and Aaron Price. The remainder of the staff was filled in the weeks that followed National Signing Day.

Name	Position	Alma mater	Reference
Chris Ball	Secondary	Missouri Western (1986)	
Bob Connelly	Offensive line	Texas A&M–Commerce (1994)	
Kasey Dunn	Assistant head coach, running backs	Idaho (1992)	
Joe Kines	Defensive coordinator	Jacksonville State (1967)	
Aaron Price	Special teams, quarterbacks	Washington State (1994)	
Eric Price	Offensive coordinator, wide receivers	Weber State (1990)	
Paul Randolph	Defensive ends	UT Martin (1990)	
Sparky Woods	Tight ends	Carson–Newman (1976)	
Buddy Wyatt	Defensive line	TCU (1989)	

==== Spring practice ====
The 2003 spring practices started on March 3, and concluded with the annual A-Day game on March 29. During the month of practice, offensively the team began the transition from Franchione's option offense to Price's passing attack. For the A-Day game, the Crimson team of offensive starters defeated the White team of defensive starters by a final score of 47–0 before 34,000 fans in Bryant–Denny Stadium. For their performances, Antwan Odom earned the Dwight Stephenson Lineman of the A-Day Game Award and Brodie Croyle earned the Dixie Howell Memorial Most Valuable Player of the A-Day Game Award.

==== Price's dismissal ====
On May 3, 2003, university president Robert Witt announced the firing of Price immediately as the head coach of the Crimson Tide. Although both the university and Price were in agreement in principle to his seven-year, $10 million contract, Price never signed it and thus was not awarded any severance pay with his dismissal. Later, a story in Sports Illustrated stated Price had been seen at a strip club "making it rain" and yelling "Roll Tide, Roll!". He allegedly later checked into a local hotel with at least one exotic dancer from the club, and the magazine further alleged Price had sex with one of the strippers, a claim which Price denied, although he acknowledged being intoxicated on the evening in question. He filed a $20 million libel and defamation suit against Sports Illustrated.

=== Mike Shula hiring ===
After the dismissal of Price, Alabama interviewed only three candidates to serve as his successor: Sylvester Croom, Richard Williamson and Mike Shula. On May 9, 2003, Alabama hired Mike Shula as their fourth head coach in four years.

After he was hired, Shula retained much of the coaching staff put in place by Price; however, he did make several changes. On May 13, David Rader was hired to serve as both offensive coordinator and quarterbacks coach as the replacement for both Aaron Price and Eric Price. On May 23, Dave Ungerer was hired to serve as special teams coach as the replacement for Aaron Price. The final coach added was Charlie Harbison as running backs coach as the replacement for Kasey Dunn.

== Game summaries ==
=== South Florida ===
Team	1	2	3	4	Total
South Florida	7	10	0	0	17
• Alabama	7	10	16	7	40

- Location: Birmingham, Alabama
- Game start: 2:08 p.m.
- Elapsed time: 3:27
- Game attendance: 76,780
- Game weather: 89°, partly cloudy, winds variable @ 5 mph
- Referee: Rocky Goode
- Television network: ESPN

Scoring summary
1	8:12	South Florida	Brian Fisher 13-yard pass from Ronnie Banks (Santiago Gramática kick)	South Florida 7–0
1	5:27	Alabama	Charlie Peprah 51-yard interception return (Brian Bostick kick)	7–7
2	11:01	South Florida	Brian Fisher 17-yard run (Santiago Gramática kick)	South Florida 14–7
2	1:32	South Florida	Santiago Gramática 45-yard field goal	South Florida 17–7
2	0:26	Alabama	Triandos Luke 10-yard pass from Brodie Croyle (Brian Bostick kick)	South Florida 17–14
2	0:00	Alabama	Brian Bostick 40-yard field goal	17–17
3	11:07	Alabama	Brian Bostick 25-yard field goal	Alabama 20–17
3	9:51	Alabama	Shaud Williams 73-yard punt return (Brian Bostick kick)	Alabama 27–17
3	3:01	Alabama	Shaud Williams 3-yard run (Brian Bostick kick blocked)	Alabama 33–17
4	7:19	Alabama	Shaud Williams 1-yard run (Brian Bostick kick)	Alabama 40–17

In 2000, the NCAA voted to allow its member schools to schedule a 12th game for both the 2002 and 2003 seasons. As such, in June 2000 Alabama scheduled the South Florida Bulls to open the 2003 season in the first all-time meeting between the schools. In what was the first game of the Mike Shula era, Shaud Williams scored three touchdowns in this 40–17 victory at Legion Field. After each team traded punts to open the game, the Bulls took an early 7–0 lead when Ronnie Banks threw a 13-yard touchdown pass to Brian Fisher. The Crimson Tide tied the game at 7–7 later in the first quarter after Charlie Peprah intercepted a Banks pass and returned it 51-yards for the touchdown. South Florida responded in the second quarter and took a 17–7 lead on a 17-yard Brian Fisher touchdown run and 45-yard Santiago Gramática field goal. Alabama then tied the game 17–17 at halftime after they scored ten points in the final 0:26 of the half. After Brodie Croyle threw a 10-yard touchdown pass to Triandos Luke, the Bulls' J. R. Reed fumbled the kickoff that ensued and gave the Crimson Tide possession at the USF 24-yard line. Three plays later the score was tied after Brian Bostick connected on a 40-yard field goal as time expired.

Alabama took their first lead of the game after they scored on a 25-yard Brian Bostick field goal early in the third quarter. After the Crimson Tide defense held the Bulls to a three-and-out on their first second half possession, Shaud Williams returned a punt 73-yards for a touchdown and a 27–17 lead. Williams then scored his second touchdown on Alabama's next offensive possession with his three-yard run, and after a blocked extra point led 33–17. After Gramática missed a 19-yard field goal early in the fourth quarter, the Crimson Tide went on a 15-play, 80-yard drive that culminated in Williams' third touchdown of the game on a one-yard run and made the final score 40–17. For his 98-yards rushing and two touchdowns, Williams was named the SEC Offensive Player of the Week.

This game is also notable for being the final home game played by the Crimson Tide at Legion Field. Although Alabama was scheduled to play Middle Tennessee at Legion to open the 2005 season and was under contract to play one final game in either the 2007 or 2008 seasons, in August 2004 the eastern upper deck at the stadium was declared structurally unsound and unsafe to use. As such, on August 19, 2004, Alabama and Birmingham officials canceled their contract to play the final two games at Legion Field and thus made the game against the Bulls the final for the Crimson Tide in Birmingham.

Statistics	South Florida	Alabama
First downs	12	24
Total yards	256	391
Rushing yards	51	188
Passing yards	205	203
Turnovers	3	1
Time of possession	22:52	37:08

Team	Category	Player	Statistics
South Florida	Passing	Ronnie Banks	17–33, 199 yards, 1 TD, 1 INT
South Florida	Rushing	Vince Brewer	9 carries, 28 yards
South Florida	Receiving	Huey Whittaker; Casey Cobbs	5 receptions, 53 yards 2 receptions, 53 yards
Alabama	Passing	Brodie Croyle	14–27, 203 yards, 1 TD
Alabama	Rushing	Shaud Williams	28 carries, 98 yards, 2 TD
Alabama	Receiving	Zach Fletcher	3 receptions, 79 yards

=== Oklahoma ===
Team	1	2	3	4	Total
• #1 Oklahoma	6	7	7	0	20
Alabama	0	3	7	3	13

- Location: Tuscaloosa, Alabama
- Game start: 6:47 p.m.
- Elapsed time: 3:27
- Game attendance: 83,818
- Game weather: 79°, cloudy, winds SE @ 7 mph
- Referee: Tom Ahlers
- Television network: ESPN

Scoring summary
1	12:22	Oklahoma	Trey DiCarlo 34-yard field goal	Oklahoma 3–0
1	7:10	Oklahoma	Trey DiCarlo 40-yard field goal	Oklahoma 6–0
2	4:55	Alabama	Brian Bostick 44-yard field goal	Oklahoma 6–3
2	3:54	Oklahoma	Mark Clayton 46-yard pass from Jason White (Trey DiCarlo kick)	Oklahoma 13–3
3	6:53	Alabama	Triandos Luke 20-yard pass from Brodie Croyle (Brian Bostick kick)	Oklahoma 13–10
3	4:31	Oklahoma	Brandon Jones 47-yard pass from Jason White (Trey DiCarlo kick)	Oklahoma 20–10
4	1:32	Alabama	Brian Bostick 36-yard field goal	Oklahoma 20–13

In what was the first game ever played by Oklahoma in the state of Alabama, the Crimson Tide nearly upset the No. 1 ranked Sooners only to lose 20–13 at Bryant–Denny Stadium. Oklahoma took a 6–0 first quarter lead after Trey DiCarlo connected on field goals of 34 and 40 yards. Midway through the second quarter, the Crimson Tide cut the Sooners' lead in half to 6–3 on a 44-yard Brian Bostick field goal. However, Oklahoma responded on their next possession when Jason White threw a 46-yard touchdown pass to Mark Clayton and gave the Sooners a 13–3 halftime lead.

After DiCarlo missed a 31-yard field goal late in the third quarter, the Crimson Tide scored their only touchdown of the game on the drive that ensued on a 20-yard Brodie Croyle pass to Triandos Luke and made the score 13–10. Oklahoma responded almost immediately on the next drive with a 47-yard White touchdown pass to Brandon Jones and extended their lead back to ten points at 20–10. The final points of the game came late in the fourth quarter on a 36-yard Bostick field goal that made the final score 20–13. The loss brought Alabama's all-time record against the Sooners to 1–2–1.

Statistics	Oklahoma	Alabama
First downs	13	19
Total yards	355	303
Rushing yards	74	108
Passing yards	281	195
Turnovers	0	2
Time of possession	30:30	29:30

Team	Category	Player	Statistics
Oklahoma	Passing	Jason White	21–35, 259 yards, 2 TD
Oklahoma	Rushing	Kejuan Jones	20 carries, 63 yards
Oklahoma	Receiving	Brandon Jones	7 receptions, 86 yards, 1 TD
Alabama	Passing	Brodie Croyle	24–42, 195 yards, 1 TD, 2 INT
Alabama	Rushing	Shaud Williams	17 carries, 91 yards
Alabama	Receiving	Dre Fulgham	4 receptions, 59 yards

=== Kentucky ===
Team	1	2	3	4	Total
Kentucky	0	7	3	7	17
• Alabama	7	3	3	14	27

- Location: Tuscaloosa, Alabama
- Game start: 6:47 p.m.
- Elapsed time: 3:19
- Game attendance: 83,818
- Game weather: 77°, winds W @ 9 mph
- Referee: Thomas Ritter
- Television network: ESPN

Scoring summary
1	3:52	Alabama	Shaud Williams 15-yard run (Brian Bostick kick)	Alabama 7–0
2	10:13	Alabama	Brian Bostick 43-yard field goal	Alabama 10–0
2	6:33	Kentucky	Draak Davis 1-yard run (Taylor Begley kick)	Alabama 10–7
3	7:59	Alabama	Brian Bostick 30-yard field goal	Alabama 13–7
3	2:22	Kentucky	Taylor Begley 27-yard field goal	Alabama 13–10
4	14:56	Alabama	Shaud Williams 2-yard run (Brian Bostick kick)	Alabama 20–10
4	5:11	Alabama	Shaud Williams 7-yard run (Brian Bostick kick)	Alabama 27–10
4	4:03	Kentucky	Derek Abney 24-yard pass from Jared Lorenzen (Taylor Begley kick)	Alabama 27–17

To open conference play for the 2003 season, Alabama hosted the Kentucky Wildcats and behind Shaud Williams' second three touchdown game of the season won 27–17. After Brian Bostick missed a 27-yard field goal on the opening possession of the game, several punts were traded before Williams scored his first touchdown on a 15-yard run to give Alabama a 7–0 first quarter lead. After a 43-yard Bostick field goal extended the Alabama lead to 10–0 early in the second quarter, the Wildcats made the halftime score 10–7 after Draak Davis scored on a one-yard touchdown run. Alabama threatened to score a touchdown just before halftime, but the Brodie Croyle pass was intercepted in the endzone by Chad Anderson for a touchback.

In the third quarter Bostick scored on a 30-yard field goal and Taylor Begley scored on a 27-yard field goal for the Wildcats that made the score 13–10 as the teams entered the fourth quarter. On the first play of the fourth, Williams scored his second touchdown of the game on a two-yard run for a 20–10 Crimson Tide lead. Begley missed a 49-yard field goal later in the quarter, and on the Alabama drive that ensued, Williams scored his third touchdown of the game on a seven-yard run and made the score 27–10. Kentucky then made the final score 27–17 when Jared Lorenzen threw a 24-yard touchdown pass to Derek Abney late in the fourth quarter. For his 174-yards rushing and three touchdowns, Williams was named the SEC Offensive Player of the Week for the second time of the season. The victory improved Alabama's all-time record against the Wildcats to 32–2–1.

Statistics	Kentucky	Alabama
First downs	11	29
Total yards	195	464
Rushing yards	26	266
Passing yards	169	198
Turnovers	0	1
Time of possession	23:34	36:26

Team	Category	Player	Statistics
Kentucky	Passing	Jared Lorenzen	15–24, 169 yards, 1 TD
Kentucky	Rushing	Draak Davis	10 carries, 28 yards
Kentucky	Receiving	Derek Abney	5 receptions, 64 yards, 1 TD
Alabama	Passing	Brodie Croyle	14–27, 198 yards, 1 INT
Alabama	Rushing	Shaud Williams	30 carries, 174 yards, 3 TD
Alabama	Receiving	Triandos Luke	3 receptions, 50 yards

=== Northern Illinois ===
Team	1	2	3	4	Total
• Northern Illinois	2	3	7	7	19
#21 Alabama	6	3	0	7	16

- Location: Tuscaloosa, Alabama
- Game start: 6:05 p.m.
- Elapsed time: 2:44
- Game attendance: 83,818
- Game weather: 84°, overcast, winds NW @ 5 mph
- Referee: Doyle Jackson
- Television network: PPV

Scoring summary
1	2:57	Alabama	Zach Fletcher 28-yard pass from Brodie Croyle (Brian Bostick kick blocked)	Alabama 6–0
1	2:57	Northern Illinois	Kevin Woods PAT return	Alabama 6–2
2	10:04	Northern Illinois	Steve Azar 51-yard field goal	Alabama 6–5
2	6:11	Alabama	Brian Bostick 35-yard field goal	Alabama 9–5
3	6:05	Northern Illinois	Shatone Powers 12-yard pass from Josh Haldi (Steve Azar kick)	Northern Illinois 12–9
4	7:28	Northern Illinois	Dan Sheldon 48-yard pass from Josh Haldi (Steve Azar kick)	Northern Illinois 19–9
4	5:36	Alabama	Shaud Williams 54-yard run (Brian Bostick kick)	Northern Illinois 19–16

Although the No. 21 Crimson Tide were two touchdown favorites over Northern Illinois, they were upset 19–16 in what was the first all-time win over a SEC team for the Huskies. Late in the first quarter, Alabama scored a touchdown on a 28-yard Brodie Croyle pass to Zach Fletcher. However, the extra point was blocked by Jason Frank and returned by Kevin Woods for a defensive two-point conversion and a 6–2 Crimson Tide lead. In the second quarter, the Huskies scored on a 51-yard Steve Azar field goal before Brian Bostick kicked a field goal from 35 yards out and made the halftime score 9–5.

Northern then took a 12–9 lead midway through the third quarter when Josh Haldi threw a 12-yard touchdown pass to Shatone Powers. After a series of punts, midway through the fourth quarter, Haldi threw a 48-yard touchdown pass to Dan Sheldon and extended the Huskies' lead to 19–9. Alabama responded on their next possession with a 54-yard Shaud Williams touchdown run that made the score 19–16. However this proved to be the final points of the game in their defeat.

Statistics	Northern Illinois	Alabama
First downs	16	15
Total yards	267	394
Rushing yards	118	118
Passing yards	149	276
Turnovers	0	0
Time of possession	30:21	29:39

Team	Category	Player	Statistics
Northern Illinois	Passing	Josh Haldi	16–24, 149 yards, 2 TD
Northern Illinois	Rushing	Michael Turner	27 carries, 156 yards
Northern Illinois	Receiving	Dan Sheldon	2 receptions, 49 yards, 1 TD
Alabama	Passing	Brodie Croyle	22–39, 276 yards, 1 TD
Alabama	Rushing	Shaud Williams	13 carries, 96 yards, 1 TD
Alabama	Receiving	Dre Fulgham	3 receptions, 72 yards

=== Arkansas ===
Team	1	2	3	4	OT	2OT	Total
• #9 Arkansas	7	3	7	14	0	3	34
Alabama	7	3	21	0	0	0	31

- Location: Tuscaloosa, Alabama
- Game start: 3:37 p.m.
- Elapsed time: 3:42
- Game attendance: 83,818
- Game weather: 72°, thunderstorms, winds SW @ 9 mph
- Referee: Penn Wagers
- Television network: CBS

Scoring summary
1	12:08	Arkansas	Matt Jones 39-yard run (David Carlton kick)	Arkansas 7–0
1	2:57	Alabama	Triandos Luke 16-yard pass from Brodie Croyle (Brian Bostick kick)	7–7
2	1:52	Arkansas	Chris Balseiro 38-yard field goal	Arkansas 10–7
2	0:00	Alabama	Brian Bostick 48-yard field goal	10–10
3	13:28	Alabama	Dre Fulgham 71-yard pass from Brodie Croyle (Brian Bostick kick)	Alabama 17–10
3	11:50	Alabama	Dre Fulgham 12-yard pass from Brodie Croyle (Brian Bostick kick)	Alabama 24–10
3	7:21	Alabama	Shaud Williams 80-yard run (Brian Bostick kick)	Alabama 31–10
3	2:03	Arkansas	Cedric Cobbs 5-yard run (Chris Balseiro kick)	Alabama 31–17
4	8:31	Arkansas	Mark Pierce 2-yard run (Chris Balseiro kick)	Alabama 31–24
4	0:27	Arkansas	Richard Smith 3-yard pass from Matt Jones (Chris Balseiro kick)	31–31
OT2	0:00	Arkansas	Chris Balseiro 19-yard field goal	Arkansas 34–31

Although the Crimson Tide led Arkansas by three touchdowns late in the third quarter, the Razorbacks rallied to tie the game at the end of regulation and win on a field goal in the second overtime period by a final score of 34–31. Arkansas took an early 7–0 lead after Matt Jones scored a touchdown on a 39-yard run on the opening drive of the game. After David Carlton missed a 32-yard field goal on their second possession, Alabama tied the game on the drive that ensued when Brodie Croyle threw a 16-yard touchdown pass to Triandos Luke. After Carlton missed his second field goal of the game early in the second quarter, Chris Balseiro gave the Razorbacks a 10–7 lead on their next possession with his 38-yard field goal. The Crimson Tide responded on their next possession with a 48-yard Brian Bostick field goal as time expired to tie the game 10–10 at halftime.

Alabama opened the third quarter with a 71-yard Croyle touchdown pass to Dre Fulgham for a 17–10 lead. On their first offensive play of the second half, Jones threw an interception to Anthony Madison that was returned to the Arkansas 23-yard line. Three plays later the Crimson Tide led 24–10 when Croyle connected with Fulgham on a 12-yard touchdown pass. Alabama then scored their third consecutive touchdown on their next possession on an 80-yard Shaud Williams touchdown run for a 31–10 lead. Arkansas then responded with three straight touchdowns of their own to tie the game at the end of regulation. The first came late in the third quarter on a five-yard Cedric Cobbs touchdown run and the final pair came in the fourth quarter on a two-yard Mark Pierce run and a three-yard Richard Smith reception from Jones.

In the first overtime period, Charles Jones intercepted a Jones pass to keep Arkansas scoreless. However, Alabama also failed to convert a 36-yard Bostick field goal to send the game into a second overtime. On the first play of the second overtime, Croyle was intercepted by Jimarr Gallon to again keep Alabama scoreless. Seven plays into their possession, Arkansas connected on a 19-yard Balseiro field goal and won the game 34–31. The loss brought Alabama's all-time record against the Razorbacks 8–6 (9–5 without an NCAA forfeit).

Statistics	Arkansas	Alabama
First downs	28	17
Total yards	491	384
Rushing yards	289	158
Passing yards	202	226
Turnovers	4	2
Time of possession	36:34	23:16

Team	Category	Player	Statistics
Arkansas	Passing	Matt Jones	10–17, 123 yards, 1 TD, 2 INT
Arkansas	Rushing	Cedric Cobbs	36 carries, 198 yards, 1 TD
Arkansas	Receiving	Steven Harris	4 receptions, 55 yards
Alabama	Passing	Brodie Croyle	12–25, 204 yards, 3 TD, 1 INT
Alabama	Rushing	Shaud Williams	19 carries, 135 yards, 1 TD
Alabama	Receiving	Dre Fulgham	2 receptions, 83 yards, 2 TD

=== Georgia ===
Team	1	2	3	4	Total
Alabama	3	7	6	7	23
• #11 Georgia	6	31	0	0	37

- Location: Athens, Georgia
- Game start: 2:34 p.m.
- Elapsed time: 3:42
- Game attendance: 92,058
- Game weather: 72°, fair, winds SW @ 10 mph
- Referee: Terry Brown
- Television network: CBS

Scoring summary
1	12:45	Alabama	Brian Bostick 42-yard field goal	Alabama 3–0
1	6:44	Georgia	Billy Bennett 27-yard field goal	3–3
1	2:36	Georgia	Billy Bennett 44-yard field goal	Georgia 6–3
2	13:38	Georgia	Billy Bennett 52-yard field goal	Georgia 9–3
2	12:32	Georgia	Thomas Davis 7-yard blocked punt return (Billy Bennett kick)	Georgia 16–3
2	7:55	Georgia	Jamario Smith 10-yard pass from D. J. Shockley (Billy Bennett kick)	Georgia 23–3
2	6:54	Georgia	Kregg Lumpkin 1-yard run (Billy Bennett kick)	Georgia 30–3
2	3:51	Alabama	Dre Fulgham 18-yard pass from Spencer Pennington (Brian Bostick kick)	Georgia 30–10
2	0:30	Georgia	Benjamin Watson 3-yard pass from David Greene (Billy Bennett kick)	Georgia 37–10
3	1:06	Alabama	Charles Jones 30-yard interception return (Brian Bostick kick failed)	Georgia 37–16
4	14:05	Alabama	Juwan Garth 10-yard fumble return (Brian Bostick kick)	Georgia 37–23

In what was their first road game of the season, Alabama traveled to Athens where the Georgia Bulldogs scored 31 points in the second quarter en route to a 37–23 victory. After the Crimson Tide took an early 3–0 lead on a 42-yard Brian Bostick field goal, Georgia responded with a trio of Billy Bennett field goals from 27, 44 and 52-yards to take a 9–3 lead early in the second quarter. Georgia then extended their lead to 37–10 by halftime with four second-quarter touchdowns.

The Bulldogs scored first when Jarrett Berry blocked a Bo Freelend punt that was returned seven-yards by Thomas Davis for a touchdown. The Georgia defense then held the Crimson Tide and forced a change of possession on downs to give the Bulldogs the ball at the Alabama 44-yard line. Five plays later, D. J. Shockley threw a 10-yard touchdown pass to Jamario Smith for a 23–3 lead. After Ramzee Robinson fumbled the kickoff that ensued, Georgia took possession and four plays later led 30–3 when Kregg Lumpkin scored on a one-yard run. On their next possession, Alabama managed to score their first touchdown on an 18-yard Spencer Pennington pas to Dre Fulgham that made the score 30–10. The Crimson Tide defense did get a stop on their next possession to force a Georgia punt; however, on the first offensive play for Alabama, Pennington fumbled to give the Bulldogs possession at their 29-yard line. With only 0:30 left in the quarter, Georgia made the halftime score 37–10 when David Greene threw a three-yard touchdown pass to Benjamin Watson.

Although the Alabama defense held Georgia scoreless in the second half, so did the Georgia defense and the only second half points came on a pair of defensive touchdowns for the Crimson Tide. In the third quarter, Charles Jones intercepted a Greene pass and returned it 30-yards for a touchdown, and early in the fourth Juwan Garth recovered a fumble and returned it 10-yards to make the final score 37–23. The loss brought Alabama's all-time record against the Bulldogs 35–24–4.

Statistics	Alabama	Georgia
First downs	12	21
Total yards	209	370
Rushing yards	94	96
Passing yards	115	274
Turnovers	3	3
Time of possession	25:27	34:33

Team	Category	Player	Statistics
Alabama	Passing	Spencer Pennington	9–20, 109 yards, 1 TD, 1 INT
Alabama	Rushing	Shaud Williams	15 carries, 58 yards
Alabama	Receiving	Dre Fulgham	4 receptions, 41 yards, 1 TD
Georgia	Passing	David Greene	21–38, 252 yards, 1 TD, 2 INT
Georgia	Rushing	Kregg Lumpkin	14 carries, 55 yards, 1 TD
Georgia	Receiving	Damien Gary	6 receptions, 74 yards

=== Southern Miss ===
Team	1	2	3	4	Total
Southern Miss	0	3	0	0	3
• Alabama	7	3	0	7	17

- Location: Tuscaloosa, Alabama
- Game start: 2:05 p.m.
- Elapsed time: 2:36
- Game attendance: 83,818
- Game weather: 79°, partly cloudy, winds E @ 6 mph
- Referee: Rocky Goode
- Television network: PPV

Scoring summary
1	2:01	Alabama	Shaud Williams 44-yard run (Brian Bostick kick)	Alabama 7–0
2	2:56	Alabama	Brian Bostick 23-yard field goal	Alabama 10–0
2	0:00	Southern Miss	Darren McCaleb 27-yard field goal	Alabama 10–3
4	8:37	Alabama	Shaud Williams 1-yard run (Brian Bostick kick)	Alabama 17–3

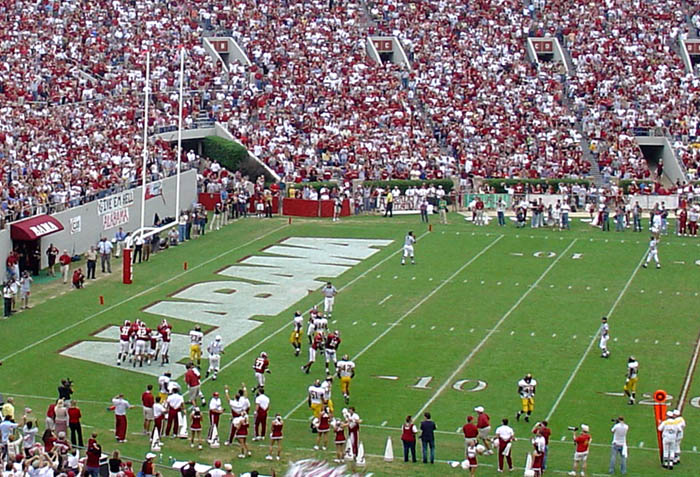
Alabama one play prior to their fourth-quarter touchdown run by Shaud Williams.

On homecoming in Tuscaloosa, Alabama defeated the Southern Miss Golden Eagles 17–3 in what was the first all-time start for quarterback Brandon Avalos. The Crimson Tide took a 7–0 first quarter lead when Shaud Williams scored on a 44-yard touchdown run. After a series of punts, late in the second quarter, Alabama connected on a 23-yard Brian Bostick field goal and Southern Miss on a 27-yard Darren McCaleb field goal that made the halftime score 10–3.

After a scoreless third quarter, Bostick missed a 36-yard field goal before Chris James blocked a Luke Johnson punt that gave the Crimson Tide possession at the Golden Eagles' one-yard line. On the next play, Williams made the score 17–3 with his one-yard touchdown run. The game concluded with a pair of lost fumbles by Southern Miss and an Avalos interception with a final score of 17–3. In the game, Williams rushed for 170 yards on 28 carries and was responsible for both of Alabama's touchdowns in the game. The victory improved Alabama's all-time record against the Golden Eagles to 32–6–2 (33–5–2 without an NCAA forfeit).

Statistics	Southern Miss	Alabama
First downs	16	12
Total yards	261	255
Rushing yards	17	243
Passing yards	244	12
Turnovers	2	1
Time of possession	29:20	30:40

Team	Category	Player	Statistics
Southern Miss	Passing	Dustin Almond	16–28, 196 yards
Southern Miss	Rushing	Tim Blackwell	14 carries, 15 yards
Southern Miss	Receiving	Antwon Courington	9 receptions, 98 yards
Alabama	Passing	Brandon Avalos	3–7, 12 yards, 1 INT
Alabama	Rushing	Shaud Williams	28 carries, 170 yards, 2 TD
Alabama	Receiving	Zach Fletcher	1 reception, 9 yards

=== Ole Miss ===
Team	1	2	3	4	Total
Alabama	0	10	6	12	28
• Ole Miss	24	7	7	5	43

- Location: Oxford, Mississippi
- Game start: 11:30 a.m.
- Elapsed time: 3:16
- Game attendance: 60,825
- Game weather: 61°, sunny, winds NE @ 4 mph
- Referee: Thomas Ritter
- Television network: JPS

Scoring summary
1	11:22	Ole Miss	Jonathan Nichols 51-yard field goal	Ole Miss 3–0
1	10:23	Ole Miss	Taye Biddle 23-yard pass from Eli Manning (Jonathan Nichols kick)	Ole Miss 10–0
1	4:40	Ole Miss	Taye Biddle 55-yard pass from Eli Manning (Jonathan Nichols kick)	Ole Miss 17–0
1	0:11	Ole Miss	Brandon Jacobs 10-yard run (Jonathan Nichols kick)	Ole Miss 24–0
2	10:52	Alabama	Shaud Williams 3-yard run (Brian Bostick kick)	Ole Miss 24–7
2	4:40	Alabama	Brian Bostick 32-yard field goal	Ole Miss 24–10
2	1:39	Ole Miss	Kerry Johnson 41-yard pass from Eli Manning (Jonathan Nichols kick)	Ole Miss 31–10
3	8:55	Ole Miss	Eli Manning 3-yard run (Jonathan Nichols kick)	Ole Miss 38–10
3	8:55	Alabama	Chris James 32-yard blocked punt return (Brian Bostick kick blocked)	Ole Miss 38–16
4	12:52	Ole Miss	Jonathan Nichols 19-yard field goal	Ole Miss 41–16
4	4:47	Alabama	Ray Hudson 22-yard pass from Brodie Croyle (Brodie Croyle pass failed)	Ole Miss 41–22
4	2:33	Alabama	Shaud Williams 5-yard pass from Brodie Croyle (Brodie Croyle pass failed)	Ole Miss 41–28
4	1:19	Ole Miss	Team safety	Ole Miss 43–28

In their annual rivalry game against Ole Miss, the Rebels took a 24–0 first quarter lead that they did not relinquish in their 43–28 victory at Oxford. The Rebels took a 3–0 lead early in the first after Jonathan Nichols connected on a 52-yard field goal. On Alabama's first offensive series, Brodie Croyle threw an interception to Travis Johnson that gave the Rebels possession at their 23-yard line. On the next play, Ole Miss took a 10–0 lead after Eli Manning threw a 23-yard touchdown pass to Taye Biddle. The Ole Miss defense then forced a punt, and Manning followed with a 55-yard touchdown pass to extend their lead to 17–0. The Rebels then closed the first quarter with a 10-yard Brandon Jacobs touchdown run that made the score 24–0.

The Crimson Tide cut into the Ole Miss lead and made the score 24–10 after they scored on their first two possessions of the second quarter. Shaud Williams scored first on a three-yard touchdown run followed by a 32-yard Brian Bostick field goal. The Rebels responded later in the quarter when Manning threw a 41-yard touchdown pass to Kerry Johnson 41-yard pass that made the halftime score 31–10.

The Ole Miss defense held the Crimson Tide to a three-and-out to open the second half, and the offense extended their lead to 38–10 after Manning scored on a three-yard touchdown run. Later in the quarter, Chris James blocked a Cody Ridgeway punt and returned it 32-yards for a touchdown that made the score 38–16. Early in the fourth, the Rebels scored their final points of the game on a 19-yard Nichols field goal. Later in the fourth, Alabama scored a pair of touchdowns that made the final score 43–28. The first came on a 22-yard Croyle pass to Ray Hudson and the second on a five-yard Croyle pass to Williams after a successful onside kick. The loss brought Alabama's all-time record against the Rebels to 40–9–2 (41–8–2 without an NCAA forfeit).

Statistics	Alabama	Ole Miss
First downs	21	23
Total yards	364	446
Rushing yards	116	216
Passing yards	248	230
Turnovers	0	3
Time of possession	28:42	31:18

Team	Category	Player	Statistics
Alabama	Passing	Brodie Croyle	21–29, 248 yards, 2 TD, 2 INT
Alabama	Rushing	Shaud Williams	18 carries, 63 yards, 1 TD
Alabama	Receiving	Dre Fulgham	3 receptions, 53 yards
Ole Miss	Passing	Eli Manning	14–22, 230 yards, 3 TD
Ole Miss	Rushing	Tremaine Turner	17 carries, 81 yards
Ole Miss	Receiving	Taye Biddle	2 receptions, 78 yards, 2 TD

=== Tennessee ===
Third Saturday in October

Team	1	2	3	4	OT	2OT	3OT	4OT	5OT	Total
• #22 Tennessee	0	3	10	7	7	7	6	3	8	51
Alabama	3	3	7	7	7	7	6	3	0	43

- Location: Tuscaloosa, Alabama
- Game start: 2:34 p.m.
- Elapsed time: 4:53
- Game attendance: 83,818
- Game weather: 81°, partly cloudy, winds S @ 10 mph
- Referee: Rogers Redding
- Television network: CBS

Scoring summary
1	4:26	Alabama	Brian Bostick 33-yard field goal	Alabama 3–0
2	0:48	Tennessee	James Wilhoit 31-yard field goal	3–3
2	0:13	Alabama	Brian Bostick 48-yard field goal	Alabama 6–3
3	12:21	Tennessee	James Banks 25-yard run (James Wilhoit kick)	Tennessee 10–6
3	8:21	Tennessee	James Wilhoit 38-yard field goal	Tennessee 13–6
3	4:42	Alabama	Triandos Luke 36-yard pass from Brodie Croyle (Brian Bostick kick)	13–13
4	4:47	Alabama	Ray Hudson 2-yard run (Brian Bostick kick)	Alabama 20–13
4	0:25	Tennessee	Troy Fleming 1-yard pass from Casey Clausen (James Wilhoit kick)	20–20
OT	0:00	Tennessee	Derrick Tinsley 6-yard pass from Casey Clausen (James Wilhoit kick)	Tennessee 27–20
OT	0:00	Alabama	Dre Fulgham 6-yard pass from Brodie Croyle (Brian Bostick kick)	27–27
OT2	0:00	Alabama	Tim Castille 12-yard run (Brian Bostick kick)	Alabama 34–27
OT2	0:00	Tennessee	James Banks 5-yard pass from Casey Clausen (James Wilhoit kick)	34–34
OT3	0:00	Tennessee	James Banks 25-yard pass from Casey Clausen (Casey Clausen pass failed)	Tennessee 40–34
OT3	0:00	Alabama	Shaud Williams 12-yard run (Brodie Croyle pass intercepted)	40–40
OT4	0:00	Alabama	Brian Bostick 28-yard field goal	Alabama 43–40
OT4	0:00	Tennessee	James Wilhoit 25-yard field goal	43–43
OT5	0:00	Tennessee	Casey Clausen 1-yard run (James Banks pass)	Tennessee 51–43

In what is the longest game ever played by the Crimson Tide to date, Alabama lost in five overtime periods to the Tennessee Volunteers 51–43 in their annual rivalry game. The first scoring opportunity of the afternoon came early in the first quarter when Mark Jones fumbled a Bo Freelend punt that was recovered by Roberto McBride to give Alabama possession at the Tennessee 26-yard line. Seven plays later the Crimson Tide took a 3–0 lead on a 33-yard Brian Bostick field goal. Neither team would score again until late in the second quarter when James Wilhoit connected on a 31-yard field goal for the Vols and Bostick connected on a 48-yard field goal that made the halftime score 6–3.

In the third quarter, Tennessee took a 10–6 lead after James Banks scored on a 25-yard run to open the half. After Corey Campbell intercepted a Brodie Croyle pass on the Alabama possession that ensued, the Vols extended their lead to 13–6 with a 38-yard Wilhoit field goal. The Crimson Tide tied the game 13–13 later in the quarter on a 36-yard Croyle touchdown pass to Triandos Luke. In the fourth, Alabama scored on a two-yard Ray Hudson touchdown run and Tennessee responded to tie the game 20–20 late on a one-yard Casey Clausen touchdown pass to Troy Fleming that sent the game into overtime.

In the first overtime period, the Vols scored on a six-yard Clausen touchdown pass to Derrick Tinsley. The Crimson Tide responded with a six-yard Croyle pass to Dre Fulgham that sent the game into a second overtime tied at 27–27. In the second overtime, Tim Castille scored on a 12-yard touchdown run for Alabama. Tennessee then scored on a five-yard Clausen touchdown pass to Banks that sent the game into a third overtime tied 34–34. In the third overtime, Clausen threw his second touchdown pass to Banks from 25-yards out for the Vols. The Crimson Tide responded with a 12-yard Williams touchdown run that sent the game into a fourth overtime tied 40–40. In the fourth overtime, each team traded field goals that made the score 43–43 as they entered the fifth overtime. In the fifth and final overtime period, Clausen scored on a one-yard touchdown run and Alabama failed to score that resulted in a 51–43 Tennessee victory. The loss brought Alabama's all-time record against the Volunteers to 44–35–7 (44–34–8 without an NCAA forfeit).

Statistics	Tennessee	Alabama
First downs	27	24
Total yards	492	473
Rushing yards	209	258
Passing yards	283	215
Turnovers	3	1
Time of possession	23:43	36:17

Team	Category	Player	Statistics
Tennessee	Passing	Casey Clausen	23–43, 283 yards, 4 TD
Tennessee	Rushing	Cedric Houston	16 carries, 83 yards
Tennessee	Receiving	James Banks	7 receptions, 103 yards, 2 TD
Alabama	Passing	Brodie Croyle	21–38, 215 yards, 2 TD, 1 INT
Alabama	Rushing	Shaud Williams	40 carries, 166 yards, 1 TD
Alabama	Receiving	Zach Fletcher	1 reception, 51 yards

=== Mississippi State ===
Team	1	2	3	4	Total
• Alabama	14	10	0	14	38
Mississippi State	0	0	0	0	0

- Location: Starkville, Mississippi
- Game start: 11:33 a.m.
- Elapsed time: 3:06
- Game attendance: 48,242
- Game weather: 58°, sunny, winds N @ 9 mph
- Referee: Doyle Jackson
- Television network: JPS

Scoring summary
1	13:19	Alabama	Zach Fletcher 86-yard pass from Brodie Croyle (Brian Bostick kick)	Alabama 7–0
1	11:28	Alabama	Tyrone Prothro 17-yard pass from Brodie Croyle (Brian Bostick kick)	Alabama 14–0
2	10:35	Alabama	Brian Bostick 38-yard field goal	Alabama 17–0
2	5:22	Alabama	Zach Fletcher 32-yard pass from Brodie Croyle (Brian Bostick kick)	Alabama 24–0
4	12:50	Alabama	Shaud Williams 3-yard run (Brian Bostick kick)	Alabama 31–0
4	1:19	Alabama	Tim Castille 6-yard run (Brian Bostick kick)	Alabama 38–0

Two weeks after their five overtime loss against Tennessee, the Crimson Tide rebounded with this 38–0 victory over the Mississippi State Bulldogs in their annual rivalry game at Starkville. Alabama opened the game with an 86-yard Brodie Croyle touchdown pass to Zach Fletcher for an early 7–0 Crimson Tide lead. On the Bulldogs' possession that ensued, Charlie Peprah intercepted a Kevin Fant pass at the State 33-yard line. Three plays later, the Crimson Tide led 14–0 after Croyle threw a 17-yard touchdown pass to Tyrone Prothro. In the second quarter, Alabama scored on a 38-yard Brian Bostick field goal and a 32-yard Croyle pass to Fletcher for a 24–0 halftime lead.

After a scoreless third quarter, a pair of fourth-quarter touchdowns made the final score 38–0. The first came on a three-yard Shaud Williams touchdown run and the second on a six-yard Tim Castille touchdown run. The victory improved Alabama's all-time record against the Bulldogs to 69–16–3 (70–15–3 without NCAA forfeit). This was also Alabama's first win in Starkville since 1994.

Statistics	Alabama	Mississippi State
First downs	19	10
Total yards	401	152
Rushing yards	190	24
Passing yards	211	128
Turnovers	1	2
Time of possession	34:15	25:45

Team	Category	Player	Statistics
Alabama	Passing	Brodie Croyle	9–14, 183 yards, 3 TD, 1 INT
Alabama	Rushing	Shaud Williams	25 carries, 89 yards, 1 TD
Alabama	Receiving	Zach Fletcher	2 receptions, 118 yards, 2 TD
Mississippi State	Passing	Kevin Fant	14–29, 100 yards, 2 INT
Mississippi State	Rushing	Omarr Conner	1 carries, 24 yards
Mississippi State	Receiving	McKinley Scott	5 receptions, 55 yards

=== LSU ===
Team	1	2	3	4	Total
• #3 LSU	10	7	7	3	27
Alabama	0	0	0	3	3

- Location: Tuscaloosa, Alabama
- Game start: 6:47 p.m.
- Elapsed time: 2:56
- Game attendance: 83,818
- Game weather: 65°, partly cloudy, winds S @ 3 mph
- Referee: Steve Landis
- Television network: ESPN

Scoring summary
1	10:34	LSU	Chris Jackson 20-yard field goal	LSU 3–0
1	9:16	LSU	Michael Clayton 23-yard pass from Matt Mauck (Chris Jackson kick)	LSU 10–0
2	2:03	LSU	Eric Edwards 3-yard pass from Matt Mauck (Chris Jackson kick)	LSU 17–0
3	9:15	LSU	Alley Broussard 4-yard run (Chris Jackson kick)	LSU 24–0
4	10:11	LSU	Chris Jackson 33-yard field goal	LSU 27–0
4	6:39	Alabama	Brian Bostick 27-yard field goal	LSU 27–3

In what was the final home game of the season, against the eventual national champion LSU Tigers, Alabama lost 27–3. LSU took an early 3–0 lead when Chris Jackson connected on a 20-yard field goal on their first possession. After a defensive three-and-out, the Tigers extended their lead to 10–0 when Matt Mauck threw a 23-yard touchdown pass to Michael Clayton. The second quarter saw each quarterback throw an interception and LSU score on a three-yard Mauck touchdown pass to Eric Edwards for a 17–0 halftime lead.

After Brian Bostick missed a 45-yard field goal early in the third, the Tigers extended their lead to 24–0 on a four-yard Alley Broussard touchdown run. After a 33-yard Jackson field goal made the score 27–0, Alabama prevented the shutout with a 27-yard Brian Bostick field goal late in the fourth quarter that made the final score 27–3. The loss brought Alabama's all-time record against the Tigers to 44–19–5.

Statistics	LSU	Alabama
First downs	28	10
Total yards	470	219
Rushing yards	219	65
Passing yards	251	154
Turnovers	2	1
Time of possession	34:30	25:30

Team	Category	Player	Statistics
LSU	Passing	Matt Mauck	24–36, 251 yards, 2 TD, 1 INT
LSU	Rushing	Justin Vincent	16 carries, 83 yards
LSU	Receiving	Michael Clayton	12 receptions, 130 yards, 1 TD
Alabama	Passing	Brodie Croyle	12–33, 154 yards, 1 INT
Alabama	Rushing	Kenneth Darby	10 carries, 41 yards
Alabama	Receiving	Triandos Luke	4 reception, 60 yards

=== Auburn ===
Iron Bowl

Team	1	2	3	4	Total
Alabama	2	0	14	7	23
• Auburn	18	0	3	7	28

- Location: Auburn, Alabama
- Game start: 6:47 p.m.
- Elapsed time: 3:14
- Game attendance: 86,063
- Game weather: 61°, clear, winds calm
- Referee: Rogers Redding
- Television network: ESPN

Scoring summary
1	14:45	Auburn	Cadillac Williams 80-yard run (John Vaughn kick)	Auburn 7–0
1	11:50	Alabama	Team safety	Auburn 7–2
1	8:51	Auburn	Ben Obomanu 64-yard pass from Jason Campbell (Jason Campbell rush)	Auburn 15–2
1	4:07	Auburn	John Vaughn 22-yard field goal	Auburn 18–2
3	14:45	Alabama	Brandon Brooks 96-yard kickoff return (Brian Bostick kick)	Auburn 18–9
3	9:06	Alabama	Shaud Williams 6-yard run (Brian Bostick kick)	Auburn 18–16
3	5:18	Auburn	John Vaughn 32-yard field goal	Auburn 21–16
4	7:27	Auburn	Cadillac Williams 1-yard run (John Vaughn kick)	Auburn 28–16
4	1:03	Alabama	Lance Taylor 14-yard pass from Brodie Croyle (Brian Bostick kick)	Auburn 28–23

In the 2003 edition of the Iron Bowl against the Auburn, the Tigers won for the second consecutive year with this 28–23 victory. Auburn took a 7–0 lead on the first offensive play of the game on an 80-yard Cadillac Williams touchdown run. After an Alabama punt was downed at the Auburn one-yard line, Williams was tackled in the end zone on the next play for a safety that made the score 7–2. The Tigers' defense then forced a three-and-out, and three plays later Jason Campbell threw a 64-yard touchdown pass to Ben Obomanu and after the two-point conversion led 15–2. A 22-yard John Vaughn field goal then made the score 18–2 at the end of the first quarter, and remained the same at halftime after a scoreless second quarter.

The Crimson Tide opened the second half with a touchdown on the first play of the third quarter on a 96-yard Brandon Brooks kickoff return that made the score 18–9. After the Alabama defense forced an Auburn punt, the Crimson Tide cut the Tigers' lead to 18–16 after Shaud Williams scored on a six-yard touchdown run. A 32-yard Vaughn field goal made the score 21–16 in favor of the Tigers as they entered the fourth quarter. In the final quarter, Auburn scored on a one-yard Williams run and Alabama on a 14-yard Brodie Croyle pass to Lance Taylor that made the final score 28–23. The Loss brought Alabama's all-time record against the Tigers to 39–29–1.

Statistics	Alabama	Auburn
First downs	13	21
Total yards	291	519
Rushing yards	111	249
Passing yards	180	270
Turnovers	3	3
Time of possession	30:14	29:46

Team	Category	Player	Statistics
Alabama	Passing	Brodie Croyle	13–29, 180 yards, 1 TD, 2 INT
Alabama	Rushing	Shaud Williams	18 carries, 93 yards, 1 TD
Alabama	Receiving	Ray Hudson	4 receptions, 82 yards
Auburn	Passing	Jason Campbell	18–27, 270 yards, 1 TD, 2 INT
Auburn	Rushing	Cadillac Williams	26 carries, 204 yards, 2 TD
Auburn	Receiving	Courtney Taylor	7 receptions, 83 yards

=== Hawaii ===
Team	1	2	3	4	Total
Alabama	7	7	7	8	29
• Hawaii	0	14	2	21	37

- Location: Honolulu, Hawaii
- Game start: 6:45 p.m.
- Elapsed time: 3:50
- Game attendance: 43,477
- Game weather: 70°, winds 10–15 mps
- Referee: Rich Kollen
- Television network: ESPN

Scoring summary
1	10:46	Alabama	Shaud Williams 1-yard run (Brian Bostick kick)	Alabama 7–0
2	12:24	Alabama	Clint Johnston 2-yard pass from Brodie Croyle (Brian Bostick kick)	Alabama 14–0
2	11:01	Hawaii	Jeremiah Cockheran 48-yard pass from Jason Whieldon (Nolan Miranda kick)	Alabama 14–7
2	7:17	Hawaii	Se'e Poumele 4-yard pass from Jason Whieldon (Nolan Miranda kick)	14–14
3	9:23	Hawaii	Lance Samuseva sacked Brodie Croyle for a safety	Hawaii 16–14
3	6:12	Alabama	Roman Harper 73-yard blocked field goal return (Brian Bostick kick)	Alabama 21–16
4	13:55	Hawaii	Jeremiah Cockheran 47-yard pass from Jason Whieldon (Nolan Miranda kick)	Hawaii 24–21
4	7:24	Hawaii	Clifton Herbert 20-yard pass from Jason Whieldon (Nolan Miranda kick failed)	Hawaii 30–21
4	4:03	Hawaii	Jason Whieldon 18-yard run (Nolan Miranda kick)	Hawaii 37–21
4	0:29	Alabama	Lance Taylor 5-yard pass from Brodie Croyle (Brodie Croyle pass)	Hawaii 37–29

As a result of the two-year bowl ban imposed by the NCAA in 2002 and NCAA rules that allow schools to add a 13th game if it is played at Hawaii, the Crimson Tide closed the season at Aloha Stadium, and in the game, the Warriors defeated the Crimson Tide 37–29. The Crimson Tide took a 7–0 first quarter lead after Shaud Williams scored on a one-yard touchdown run. Early in the second quarter, Alabama extended their lead to 14–0 on a two-yard Brodie Croyle touchdown pass to Clint Johnston before the Warriors rallied and scored a pair of touchdowns to tie the game 14–14 at halftime. Hawaii touchdowns were scored on Jason Whieldon passes of 48-yards to Jeremiah Cockheran and four-yards to Se'e Poumele.

The Warriors then took their first lead in the third after Lance Samuseva sacked Brodie Croyle for a safety. On the Hawaii drive that ensued, Anthony Madison blocked a Nolan Miranda field goal attempt that was returned by Roman Harper for a touchdown to give Alabama a 21–16 lead. The Warriors then scored three fourth-quarter touchdowns and won the game 37–29. The first to be scored were on Whieldon touchdown passes of 47-yards to Cockheran and 20-yards to Clifton Herbert before he scored their final points on an 18-yard run. Alabama then made the final score 37–29 after Croyle threw a five-yard touchdown pass to Lance Taylor late in the game. The loss brought Alabama's all-time record against Hawaii to 1–1.

Statistics	Alabama	Hawaii
First downs	19	17
Total yards	409	409
Rushing yards	151	134
Passing yards	258	275
Turnovers	3	1
Time of possession	31:05	28:55

Team	Category	Player	Statistics
Alabama	Passing	Brodie Croyle	20–37, 247 yards, 2 TD, 2 INT
Alabama	Rushing	Shaud Williams	18 carries, 105 yards, 1 TD
Alabama	Receiving	Zach Fletcher	4 receptions, 78 yards
Hawaii	Passing	Jason Whieldon	15–25, 237 yards, 4 TD, 1 INT
Hawaii	Rushing	Michael Brewster	7 carries, 56 yards
Hawaii	Receiving	Jeremiah Cockheran	5 receptions, 124 yards, 2 TD

== Personnel ==
=== Roster ===
2003 Alabama Crimson Tide football team roster
Players
Coaches
Offense

Pos.	#	Name	Class
G	73	Dennis Alexander	Sr
QB	7	Brandon Avalos	Fr
RB	20	Justin Ballard	So
OT	70	Wesley Britt	Jr
WR	5	Brandon Brooks	So
WR	2	Antonio Carter	Sr
TE	92	David Cavan	Jr
QB	8	Teo Clark	Fr
TE	93	Donald Clarke	Sr
C	74	J. B. Closner	So
FB	49	Nathan Cox	Jr
QB	12	Brodie Croyle	So
RB	33	Kenneth Darby	Fr
WR	11	Dennis DuBois	Jr
WR	16	Derek DuBois	Fr
WR	16	Kendrick Eaton	Fr
OT	60	Von Ewing	So
WR	80	Zach Fletcher	Sr
WR	9	Will Fountain	Sr
WR	3	Dre Fulgham	Sr
WR	85	Tarry Givens	Jr
C	62	Cody Grammer	Fr
WR	81	Brandon Greer	Sr
TE	44	Ted Gryska	Jr
OT	75	Atlas Herrion	Sr
TE	94	Rusty Hill	Fr
WR	83	William Hold	Fr
RB	27	Ray Hudson	Jr
TE	88	Clint Johnston	So
C	69	Matt Lomax	Sr
RB	15	Nic Luke	Fr
WR	84	Triandos Luke	Sr
WR	1	Arturo McDowell	Fr
WR	82	Marcus McKnight	Fr
FB	31	Greg McLain	So
QB	17	Zach Golson	Fr
G	79	Danny Martz	Jr
OT	15	Evan Mathis	Jr
WR	4	Matt Miller	So
QB	13	Spencer Pennington	So
WR	86	Matt Ragland	So
G	63	Mark Sanders	So
G	78	Justin Smiley	Jr
RB	38	Josh Smith	Jr
WR	36	David Steakley	Fr
WR	39	Lance Taylor	Sr
RB	21	Shaud Williams (C)	Sr

Defense

Pos.	#	Name	Class
DT	79	J. P. Adams	Fr
DT	79	Mark Anderson	Fr
SS	10	Carlos Andrews	Sr
SS	15	Sammy Autrey	Fr
DE	19	Josh Averett	Jr
CB	18	Danny Barger	Fr
DE	94	Adam Bass	So
DE	56	Todd Bates	Jr
LB	23	Kyle Bennett	Fr
DT	86	John Paul Bevel	Sr
DT	52	Taylor Britt	Fr
DE	93	Jonathan Brunson	Jr
DT	97	Anthony Bryant	Sr
DT	95	Ahmad Childress	Jr
WR	99	Jeremy Clark	Fr
LB	18	Brooks Daniels	Sr
LB	53	Brandon Dean	Jr
DE	89	Kyle Dyer	So
LB	49	P. J. Fletcher	Jr
LB	42	Juwan Garth	Fr
LB	51	King Gladney	So
DT	77	Gerritt Gordon	Jr
SS	21	Matt Grice	Jr
DE	39	Will Hardy	So
FS	41	Roman Harper	So
DE	91	Chris Harris	Fr
FS	29	Corey Harris	Fr
CB	34	Charles Hosea	Jr
FS	32	Chris James	Jr
FS	41	Shawn Johnson	Fr
FS	20	Charles Jones	Sr
FS	5	Danny Jordan	Jr
SS	14	Bryan Kilpatrick	Fr
LB	45	Juke King	So
LB	46	Allen Long	Fr
CB	19	Roberto McBride	Sr
DE	90	Nautyn McKay-Loescher	Sr
LB	50	Matt McMullin	So
CB	9	Anthony Madison	Jr
DE	98	Antwan Odom	Jr
DB	2	Darrell Owens	So
FS	38	Corbin Pardue	So
CB	26	Charlie Peprah	So
LB	6	Derrick Pope (C)	Sr
LB	8	Freddie Roach	So
CB	17	Ramzee Robinson	Fr
CB	22	Ben Rose	Jr
LB	35	DeMeco Ryans	So
CB	23	David Scott	Sr
LB	57	David Simmons	Jr
CB	25	Walter Smith	Fr
DT	85	Kyle Tatum	Fr
SS	40	Josh Taylor	Fr
CB	1	Thurman Ward	Jr
CB	3	Ryan Wilbanks	Fr
DE	48	Leslie Williams	Sr
LB	16	Cornelius Wortham	Sr
LB	37	William Yates	Fr

Special teams

Pos.	#	Name	Class
P	12	Jeff Aul	Fr
P	44	Joey Bearden	Fr
PK	22	Brian Bostick	Jr
PK	3	Alex Fox	Jr
P	13	Bo Freeland	Jr
PK	8	Gabe Giardina	Sr
LS	53	Mitch Grissett	Jr
PK	46	Mike McLaughlin	So
LS	50	Nick Ridings	Sr
PK	43	Kyle Robinson	Sr
P	15	Jeremy Schatz	So
LS	67	David Sears	So
PK	28	Tyler Straate	Fr

Head coach

- Mike Shula

Coordinators/assistant coaches

- Chris Ball (Secondary)
- Bob Connelly (offensive line)
- Charlie Harbison (wide receivers)
- Joe Kines (defensive coordinator)
- David Rader (offensive coordinator/quarterbacks)
- Paul Randolph (defensive ends)
- Dave Ungerer (tight ends/special teams)
- Sparky Woods (running backs)
- Buddy Wyatt (defensive line)

Legend

- (C) Team captain
- (S) Suspended
- (I) Ineligible
- Injured
- Redshirt

Roster
Last update: December 8, 2012

=== Recruiting class ===
As part of the NCAA imposed penalties related to the Albert Means recruiting scandal that dated back to 1999, Alabama had the total number of football scholarships it could award reduced by seven to 18 instead of the standard 25. As such, the 2003 class only had eighteen members, with most being from within the state of Alabama. With the departure of Franchione, the Alabama recruiting coordinator Randy Ross helped keep the class together during the transition period prior to the arrival of Price.

College recruiting
Name	Hometown	School	Height	Weight	40^{‡}	Commit date
Matt Caddell; WR	McCalla, Alabama	McAdory High School	6 ft 0 in (1.83 m)	180 lb (82 kg)	4.4	Nov 26, 2002
Matt Caddell; WR	Recruit ratings: Scout: Rivals:					
Chris Capps; OL	Fairburn, Georgia	Landmark Christian School	6 ft 6 in (1.98 m)	270 lb (120 kg)	5.3	Feb 2, 2003
Chris Capps; OL	Recruit ratings: Scout: Rivals:					
Tim Castille; RB	Birmingham, Alabama	Briarwood Christian School	5 ft 11 in (1.80 m)	220 lb (100 kg)	4.5	Aug 17, 2002
Tim Castille; RB	Recruit ratings: Scout: Rivals:					
D. J. Chambers; CB	Highland Home, Alabama	Highland Home High School	6 ft 0 in (1.83 m)	180 lb (82 kg)	4.4	Feb 26, 2002
D. J. Chambers; CB	Recruit ratings: Scout: Rivals:					
Cliff Davis; QB	Eupora, Mississippi	Eupora High School	6 ft 5 in (1.96 m)	215 lb (98 kg)	4.8	Feb 5, 2002
Cliff Davis; QB	Recruit ratings: Scout: Rivals:					
Chris Felder; CB	Thomasville, Alabama	Thomasville High School	5 ft 11 in (1.80 m)	167 lb (76 kg)	4.5	Feb 26, 2002
Chris Felder; CB	Recruit ratings: Scout: Rivals:					
Eric Gray; CB	Trinity, Alabama	West Morgan High School	5 ft 11 in (1.80 m)	180 lb (82 kg)	4.45	Aug 16, 2002
Eric Gray; CB	Recruit ratings: Scout: Rivals:					
Terrence Jones; LB	Northport, Alabama	Tuscaloosa County High School	6 ft 0 in (1.83 m)	199 lb (90 kg)	4.6	Feb 3, 2003
Terrence Jones; LB	Recruit ratings: Scout: Rivals:					
Dominic Lee; DT	Birmingham, Alabama	Huffman High School	6 ft 2 in (1.88 m)	295 lb (134 kg)	5.2	Oct 21, 2002
Dominic Lee; DT	Recruit ratings: Scout: Rivals:					
Le'Ron McClain; RB	Northport, Alabama	Tuscaloosa County High School	6 ft 0.5 in (1.84 m)	242 lb (110 kg)	4.59	Feb 3, 2003
Le'Ron McClain; RB	Recruit ratings: Scout: Rivals:					
Justin Moon; OL	Guntersville, Alabama	Guntersville High School	6 ft 6 in (1.98 m)	295 lb (134 kg)	5.3	Feb 26, 2003
Justin Moon; OL	Recruit ratings: Scout: Rivals:					
Ernest Nance; LB	Courtland, Alabama	Courtland High School	6 ft 3 in (1.91 m)	210 lb (95 kg)	4.4	
Ernest Nance; LB	Recruit ratings: Rivals:					
Eric Packer; RB	Camden, Alabama	Wilcox Central High School	5 ft 9 in (1.75 m)	178 lb (81 kg)	4.38	Feb 25, 2002
Eric Packer; RB	Recruit ratings: Scout: Rivals:					
Tyrone Prothro; CB	Heflin, Alabama	Cleburne County High School	5 ft 9 in (1.75 m)	170 lb (77 kg)	4.4	Jan 24, 2003
Tyrone Prothro; CB	Recruit ratings: Scout: Rivals:					
William Roach; CB	Killen, Alabama	Brooks High School	6 ft 2 in (1.88 m)	195 lb (88 kg)	4.6	Nov 20, 2002
William Roach; CB	Recruit ratings: Scout: Rivals:					
DeMarcus Waldrop; S	Pinson, Alabama	Pinson Valley High School	6 ft 0 in (1.83 m)	180 lb (82 kg)	4.4	Jan 23, 2003
DeMarcus Waldrop; S	Recruit ratings: Scout: Rivals:					
Travis West; OL	Laurel, Mississippi	Northeast Jones High School	6 ft 4 in (1.93 m)	275 lb (125 kg)	5.2	Jul 11, 2002
Travis West; OL	Recruit ratings: Scout: Rivals:					
Overall recruit ranking: Scout: 45 Rivals: 49 ESPN: NA
‡ Refers to 40-yard dash; Note: In many cases, Scout, Rivals, 247Sports, On3, and ESPN may conflict in their listings of height, weight and 40 time.; In these cases, the average was taken. ESPN grades are on a 100-point scale.; Sources: "Scout.com Football Recruiting: Alabama". Scout.; "Scout.com Team Recruiting Rankings". Scout.; "2003 Team Ranking". Rivals.com.
