= 2005 Alabama Crimson Tide football team =

American college football season

2005 Alabama Crimson Tide football

Cotton Bowl Classic champion (vacated)

Cotton Bowl Classic, W 13–10 (vacated) vs. Texas Tech
- Conference: Southeastern Conference
- Western Division

Ranking
- Coaches: No. 8
- AP: No. 8
- Record: 0–2, 10 wins vacated (0–2 SEC, 6 wins vacated)
- Head coach: Mike Shula (3rd season)
- Offensive coordinator: David Rader (3rd season)
- Offensive scheme: Pro-style
- Defensive coordinator: Joe Kines (5th season)
- Base defense: 3–3–5
- Captains: Brodie Croyle; DeMeco Ryans
- Home stadium: Bryant–Denny Stadium

2005 Southeastern Conference football standings
	Conf.			Overall
Team	W		L	W		L
Eastern Division
No. 10 Georgia x$	6	–	2	10	–	3
South Carolina	5	–	3	7	–	5
No. 12 Florida	5	–	3	9	–	3
Vanderbilt	3	–	5	5	–	6
Tennessee	3	–	5	5	–	6
Kentucky	2	–	6	3	–	8
Western Division
No. 5 LSU xy	7	–	1	11	–	2
No. 14 Auburn x	7	–	1	9	–	3
No. 8 Alabama	6	–	2	10	–	2
Arkansas	2	–	6	4	–	7
Mississippi State	1	–	7	3	–	8
Ole Miss	1	–	7	3	–	8
Championship: Georgia 34, LSU 14
$ – BCS representative as conference champion; x – Division champion/co-champions; y – Championship game participant; Alabama had all victories vacated by the NCAA in 2010. As such, the official record for Alabama is 0–2 (0–2).; Rankings from AP Poll

The 2005 Alabama Crimson Tide football team represented the University of Alabama as a member of the Southeastern Conference (SEC) during the 2005 NCAA Division I-A football season. Led by third-year head coach Mike Shula, the Crimson Tide compiled an overall record of 10–2 with a mark of 6–2 in conference play, placing third in the SEC's Western Division. The team started off the season at 9–0, notching wins over Florida and Tennessee, the two final games of the regular season against LSU and Auburn. The Crimson Tide received a bid to the Cotton Bowl Classic, where they defeated Texas Tech on a last-second field goal. The team played home games at Bryant–Denny Stadium in Tuscaloosa, Alabama.

The season was marked by a notable catch by wide receiver Tyrone Prothro, known to Alabama fans as The Catch, against Southern Miss in the second game of the season. Prothro's career ended later that season as he suffered a broken leg against Florida. Prothro's catch won ESPN's Game Changing Performance for week two, and later the Best Play ESPY Award in all of sports for 2005.

In 2009, the National Collegiate Athletic Association (NCAA) levied sanctions against Alabama, forcing the Crimson Tide to vacate all of their wins from the season.

== Schedule ==
Date	Time	Opponent	Rank	Site	TV	Result	Attendance
September 3	7:00 p.m.	Middle Tennessee*		Bryant–Denny Stadium; Tuscaloosa, AL	PPV	W 26–7 (vacated)	81,018
September 10	7:45 p.m.	Southern Miss*		Bryant–Denny Stadium; Tuscaloosa, AL	ESPN	W 30–21 (vacated)	81,018
September 17	2:30 p.m.	at South Carolina		Williams–Brice Stadium; Columbia, SC	CBS	W 37–14 (vacated)	82,968
September 24	11:30 a.m.	Arkansas	No. 20	Bryant–Denny Stadium; Tuscaloosa, AL	JPS	W 24–13 (vacated)	81,018
October 1	2:30 p.m.	No. 5 Florida	No. 15	Bryant–Denny Stadium; Tuscaloosa, AL (rivalry)	CBS	W 31–3 (vacated)	81,018
October 15	11:00 a.m.	at Ole Miss	No. 6	Vaught–Hemingway Stadium; Oxford, MS (rivalry)	CBS	W 13–10 (vacated)	60,135
October 22	2:30 p.m.	No. 17 Tennessee	No. 5	Bryant–Denny Stadium; Tuscaloosa, AL (Third Saturday in October)	CBS	W 6–3 (vacated)	81,018
October 29	2:00 p.m.	Utah State*^{†}	No. 5	Bryant–Denny Stadium; Tuscaloosa, AL	PPV	W 35–3 (vacated)	81,018
November 5	2:30 p.m.	at Mississippi State	No. 4	Davis Wade Stadium; Starkville, MS (rivalry)	CBS	W 17–0 (vacated)	52,125
November 12	2:30 p.m.	No. 5 LSU	No. 4	Bryant–Denny Stadium; Tuscaloosa, AL (rivalry, College GameDay)	CBS	L 13–16 ^{OT}	81,018
November 19	2:30 p.m.	at No. 11 Auburn	No. 8	Jordan-Hare Stadium; Auburn, AL (Iron Bowl)	CBS	L 18–28	87,451
January 2, 2006	10:00 a.m.	vs. No. 18 Texas Tech*	No. 13	Cotton Bowl; Dallas, TX (Cotton Bowl Classic)	FOX	W 13–10 (vacated)	74,222
*Non-conference game; ^{†}Homecoming; Rankings from AP Poll released prior to the game; All times are in Central time

== Rankings ==
Ranking movements Legend: ██ Increase in ranking ██ Decrease in ranking RV = Received votes
	Week															
Poll	Pre	1	2	3	4	5	6	7	8	9	10	11	12	13	14	Final
AP	RV	RV	RV	20	15	7	6	5	5	4	4	8	14	14	13	8
Coaches	24	22	24	20	16	10	7	5	5	4	3	8	14	14	13	8
Harris	Not released				15	8	7	5	5	4	4	8	14	14	13	Not released
BCS	Not released							5	5	4	3	8	14	15	13	Not released

== Game summaries ==
=== Middle Tennessee ===
Team	1	2	3	4	Total
Middle Tennessee	0	7	0	0	7
• Alabama	2	7	14	3	26

- Location: Tuscaloosa, Alabama
- Game start: 6:12 p.m.
- Elapsed time: 3:01
- Game attendance: 81,018
- Game weather: 85°, clear, winds NNE at 7 mph
- Referee: Terry Brown
- Television network: CTSN PPV

Alabama opened the 2005 season by defeating the Middle Tennessee Blue Raiders 26–7. Alabama scored first on a defensive play. Late in the first quarter, Mark Anderson sacked the Blue Raider quarterback Clint Marks for a safety and a 2–0 Crimson Tide lead. Alabama then scored their first touchdown of the season in the second quarter on a one-yard Tim Castille run to cap a 51-yard drive. The Blue Raiders responded on the next drive with a 14-yard Marks touchdown pass to Nick McAfee to cut the Alabama lead to 9–7 at halftime.

The Crimson Tide scored on their opening drive of the third quarter when Brodie Croyle threw a 13-yard touchdown pass to Tyrone Prothro. Later in the quarter, Alabama extended their lead to 23–7 after Castille scored his second touchdown from one-yard out in the game. Ryan Saxby then scored the final points of the game in the fourth with his 32-yard field goal to make the final score 26–7. The victory improved Alabama's all-time record against the Blue Raiders to 2–0.

=== Southern Miss ===
Team	1	2	3	4	Total
Southern Miss	14	7	0	0	21
• Alabama	10	7	6	7	30

- Location: Tuscaloosa, Alabama
- Game start: 6:52 p.m.
- Elapsed time: 3:34
- Game attendance: 81,018
- Game weather: 82°, clear, winds ENE at 4 mph
- Referee: Penn Wagers
- Television network: ESPN2

After going down 21–17 at halftime, the Crimson Tide came-from-behind and defeated the Southern Miss Golden Eagles 30–21. Alabama took an early 10–0 lead after Brodie Croyle threw a 26-yard touchdown pass to D. J. Hall and Jamie Christensen connected on a 33-yard field goal. The Golden Eagles then rallied with a pair of first-quarter touchdowns to take a 14–10 lead at the end of the quarter. The first came on a defensive score when Gerald McRath intercepted a Croyle pass and returned it 33-yards and the second on a 12-yard Dustin Almond pass to Anthony Perine. Early in the second quarter Southern Miss extended their lead to 21–10 after Almond threw a 37-yard touchdown pass to Perine.

On their final offensive possession of the second quarter, Tyrone Prothro made one of the most memorable receptions in Alabama history. On a fourth-and-twelve, Croyle threw a 42-yard pass that Prothro caught on the back of Golden Eagles cornerback Jasper Faulk. Prothro had to wrap his right arm around Faulk's neck and his left arm under Faulk's right armpit to catch the ball (which appeared on replays to be blocked from his view by Faulk), and then he had to maintain possession of the ball until his knee touched down at the one-yard line. Referred to as simply The Catch, the play won the 2006 Best Play ESPY Award. The Crimson Tide then cut the lead on the following play to 21–17 just before the half after Croyle connected with Le'Ron McClain on a one-yard touchdown reception.

Alabama retook the lead in the third quarter after Tim Castille scored on a two-yard touchdown run, and led 23–21 after a failed Christensen extra point. The final points of the game came early in the fourth quarter on the second two-yard Castille touchdown run of the evening to give the Crimson Tide the 30–21 victory. For his 97 yards in kickoff returns and 34 yards punt returns, Tyrone Prothro was named the SEC Special Teams Player of the Week.

=== South Carolina ===
Team	1	2	3	4	Total
• Alabama	14	6	10	7	37
South Carolina	7	0	0	7	14

- Location: Columbia, South Carolina
- Game start: 2:30 p.m.
- Elapsed time: 3:21
- Game attendance: 82,968
- Game weather: 94°, partly cloudy, winds WSW at 10 mph
- Referee: Rocky D. Goode
- TV announcers (CBS): Verne Lundquist, Todd Blackledge, Tracy Wolfson

In Alabama's first road game of the season, the Crimson Tide defeated the South Carolina Gamecocks 37–14, earning Mike Shula only his third road win all-time as Alabama's head coach. Brodie Croyle scored first for the Crimson Tide on a 15-yard run to give Alabama a 7–0 lead after their opening drive. South Carolina then tied the game at 7–7 on the ensuing drive with a one-yard Mike Davis touchdown run. Alabama then retook the lead for good on the following possession when Croyle threw a 46-yard touchdown strike to Keith Brown. Jamie Christensen then scored a pair of second-quarter touchdowns from 41 and 29 yards to give the Crimson Tide a 20–7 halftime lead.

Christensen connected on a 27-yard field goal early in the third to extend the Alabama lead to 23–7. On the following Gamecock possession, a Carlos Thomas fumble was recovered by Alabama's Rudy Griffin at the South Carolina 39-yard line. Three plays later Kenneth Darby scored on a 22-yard touchdown run to give the Crimson Tide a 30–7 lead entering the fourth quarter. With the second-string playing in the fourth, John Parker Wilson threw a 36-yard touchdown pass to Brown for the final Alabama points of the afternoon. The final touchdown came on the ensuing South Carolina drive when Blake Mitchell threw a six-yard touchdown pass to Sidney Rice to make the final 37–14 score. For his 145 rushing yards and one touchdown, Kenneth Darby was named the SEC Offensive Player of the Week.

=== Arkansas ===
Team	1	2	3	4	Total
Arkansas	0	3	0	10	13
• #20 Alabama	0	7	3	14	24

- Location: Tuscaloosa, Alabama
- Game start: 11:34 p.m.
- Elapsed time: 3:11
- Game attendance: 81,018
- Game weather: 83°, winds SE at 12 mph
- Referee: Matt Austin
- Television network: JPS

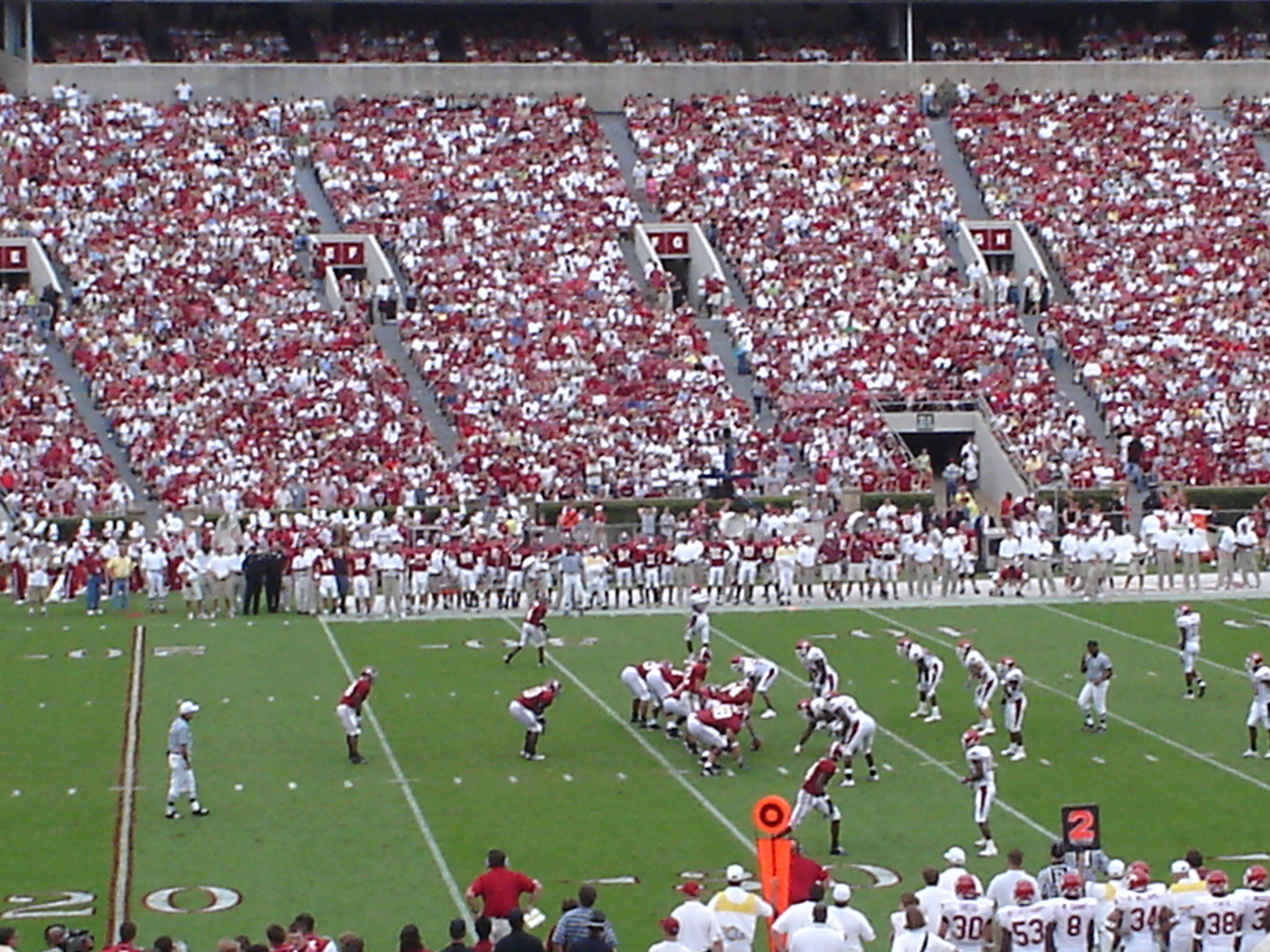
Alabama on offense.

With this 24–13 victory over the Arkansas Razorbacks to open divisional play, Alabama secured their first 4–0 start since the 1996 season. After a scoreless first quarter, Arkansas scored first with a 34-yard Chris Balseiro field goal. The Crimson Tide responded with a 43-yard Brodie Croyle touchdown pass to D. J. Hall to give Alabama a 7–3 halftime lead.

Arkansas quarterback Robert Johnson fumbled the ball on the opening offensive possession of the second half. Simeon Castille forced the fumble with a quarterback sack, and DeMeco Ryans made the recovery at the Razorback 19-yard line. Three plays later Alabama extended their lead to 10–3 after a 36-yard Jamie Christensen field goal. On the second play of the fourth quarter, Tim Castille scored on a one-yard touchdown run to take a 17–3 lead. On the following Arkansas possession, Peyton Hillis made a 12-yard run and then Darren McFadden scored on a 70-yard touchdown run to cut the Alabama lead to 17–10.

After holding the Crimson Tide to a three-and-out, the Razorbacks' Kyle Dickerson blocked a Jeremy Schatz punt that was recovered by John Aaron Rees at the Alabama eleven-yard line. The Alabama defense was able to get a stop and hold Arkansas to a 27-yard Balseiro field goal. The Crimson Tide scored the final points of the game late in the fourth when Croyle connected again with Hall, and this time it was on a five-yard pass to make the final score 24–13. For his 15 tackle performance, DeMeco Ryans was named the SEC Defensive Player of the Week; and for his 275 punting yards that included a 72-yard punt, Jeremy Schatz was named the SEC Special Teams Player of the Week.

=== Florida ===
Team	1	2	3	4	Total
#5 Florida	0	3	0	0	3
• #15 Alabama	17	7	7	0	31

- Location: Tuscaloosa, Alabama
- Game start: 2:37 p.m.
- Elapsed time: 3:19
- Game attendance: 81,018
- Game weather: 86°, partly cloudy, winds ESE at 7 mph
- Referee: Penn Wagers
- TV announcers (CBS): Verne Lundquist, Todd Blackledge & Tracy Wolfson

In what was Urban Meyer's first game as the Florida Gators head coach against Alabama, the Crimson Tide was victorious 31–3. After fumbling the Florida punt after their first offensive series, Tyrone Prothro responded on Alabama's first offensive play of the afternoon by taking a Brodie Croyle slant pass 87-yards for a 7–0 Crimson Tide lead. On the ensuing Florida possession, Chris Harris intercepted a Chris Leak pass and returned it to the Gators' two-yard line. Three plays later, Alabama had a 14–0 lead after a one-yard Tim Castille touchdown run. Jamie Christensen added a 22-yard field goal to give the Crimson Tide a 17–0 lead at the end of the first quarter.

On the first play of the second quarter, the Alabama defense completed a goal line stand after Mark Anderson and Freddie Roach combine to tackle DeShawn Wynn at the one-yard line on fourth down. Chris Hetland then scored the only Florida points of the game on their next offensive possession with his 37-yard field goal. Following the Hetland field goal, Alabama again scored on a one-play drive when Croyle connected with Keith Brown for a 65-yard touchdown reception to give the Crimson Tide a 24–3 halftime lead. Prothro then scored the final points of the game early in the third quarter with his 15-yard touchdown reception to make the score 31–3.

Although Alabama did go on to win 31–3, the game is also notable as being the last played by Tyrone Prothro. Early in the fourth quarter, he broke both his tibia and fibula after landing awkwardly in a failed attempt to make a touchdown reception on a fourth-and-five play. For his four tackle performance, Mark Anderson was named the SEC Defensive Lineman of the Week; and for his 283 passing yards and three touchdowns, Brodie Croyle was named the SEC Offensive Player of the Week.

=== Ole Miss ===
Team	1	2	3	4	Total
• #6 Alabama	0	3	7	3	13
Ole Miss	7	0	0	3	10

- Location: Oxford, Mississippi
- Game start: 11:10 a.m.
- Elapsed time: 3:20
- Game attendance: 60,135
- Game weather: 77°, sunny, winds NE at 4 mph
- Referee: Jeff Roberson
- Television network: CBS

In a game dominated by both defenses Alabama defeated their long-time rival, the Ole Miss Rebels 13–10 in Oxford. After Tim Castille failed to gain a first down on a fourth-and-one on the Rebels' six-yard line, both teams traded turnovers on successive drives. DeMeco Ryans forced a fumble by Taye Biddle that was recovered by Charlie Peprah at the Alabama 16-yard line. On the following Alabama play, Travis Johnson caused D. J. Hall to fumble that was recovered by Garry Pack. Three plays later Ole Miss took a 7–0 lead after Micheal Spurlock threw a 27-yard touchdown pass to Mario Hill. After Jamie Christensen missed a 38-yard field goal early in the second quarter, Ramzee Robinson intercepted a Spurlock pass on the first play of the ensuing possession to set up a 43-yard Christensen field goal to make the score 7–3. The Rebels missed one and had a second field goal attempt blocked later in the quarter to give Ole Miss a 7–3 halftime lead.

On their first possession of the second half, Alabama scored their only touchdown of the game on a 48-yard Kenneth Darby touchdown run. The Rebels tied the game up early in the fourth with a 24-yard Robert Bass field goal, but the Crimson Tide won the game with a 31-yard Christensen field goal as time expired to make the final score 13–10.

=== Tennessee ===
Third Saturday in October

Team	1	2	3	4	Total
#17 Tennessee	0	0	0	3	3
• #5 Alabama	0	0	3	3	6

- Location: Tuscaloosa, Alabama
- Game start: 2:39 p.m.
- Elapsed time: 3:14
- Game attendance: 81,018
- Game weather: 66°, partly cloudy, winds NNW at 9 mph
- Referee: Thomas Ritter
- Television network: CBS

In a defensive struggle against long-time rival Tennessee, Alabama extended their overall season record to 7–0 with a 6–3 victory over the Volunteers. After trading fumbles on two of the three opening possessions, Jamie Christensen missed a 50-yard field goal attempt late in the first quarter for Alabama. Neither team would have another scoring opportunity again until midway through the third quarter. After DeMeco Ryans recovered a fumbled punt by Lucas Taylor at the 50-yard line, Christensen connected on a 33-yard field goal six plays later to give the Crimson Tide a 3–0 lead.

Tennessee tied the game at 3–3 on their first possession of the fourth quarter with a 32-yard James Wilhoit field goal. In their next possession, the Volunteers reached the red zone, but on a third-and-goal play, Roman Harper forced a Cory Anderson fumble that bounced through the Alabama end zone, resulting in a touchback. The touchback kept the game tied at 3–3 and returned possession to the Crimson Tide with just over five minutes remaining in the fourth quarter. Alabama responded with a ten-play, 63-yard drive and a 34-yard Christensen field goal, taking a 6–3 lead with only seconds remaining in the game. In Tennessee's final possession, DeMeco Ryans intercepted a pass by Erik Ainge as time expired, sealing the Crimson Tide's victory. For his 11 tackle performance, DeMeco Ryans was named the SEC Defensive Player of the Week and the Walter Camp Football Foundation Defensive Player of the Week; and for his two field goals in the victory, Jamie Christensen was named the SEC Special Teams Player of the Week.

=== Utah State ===
Team	1	2	3	4	Total
Utah State	0	0	3	0	3
• #5 Alabama	14	7	7	7	35

- Location: Tuscaloosa, Alabama
- Game start: 2:08 p.m.
- Elapsed time: 3:06
- Game attendance: 81,018
- Game weather: 68°, sunny, winds NE at 4 mph
- Referee: Rick Loumiet
- Television network: PPV

In what was the final regular season, non-conference game, Alabama defeated the Utah State Aggies 35–3 on homecoming in Tuscaloosa. The Crimson Tide took a 21–0 halftime lead after a trio of Brodie Croyle touchdown passes. The first came on a nine-yard pass to Ezekial Knight, the second on a one-yard pass to Le'Ron McClain and the third on a 13-yard pass to D. J. Hall. The Aggies scored their only points of the game on their opening drive of the second half when Justin Hamblin connected on a 24-yard field goal. After a Hall fumble resulted in an Aggie touchback on the following Alabama possession, Hamblin missed a 41-yard field goal on the ensuing possession to keep the score 21–3.

The Crimson Tide then scored their fourth touchdown later in the third quarter on a 38-yard Kenneth Darby touchdown run. With the reserves playing in the fourth quarter, Alabama scored their final points when John Parker Wilson connected with Glen Coffee for a nine-yard touchdown reception and a 35–3 Crimson Tide victory.

=== Mississippi State ===
Team	1	2	3	4	Total
• #4 Alabama	0	3	14	0	17
Mississippi State	0	0	0	0	0

- Location: Starkville, Mississippi
- Game start: 2:34 p.m.
- Elapsed time: 3:26
- Game attendance: 52,125
- Game weather: 78°, sunny, winds S at 10 mph
- Referee: Terry Brown
- Television network: CBS

Against long-time rival Mississippi State, the Alabama defense had its first shutout of the season and the offense did not have a touchdown in their 17–0 victory over the Bulldogs. After a scoreless first quarter, Jamie Christensen scored the first points of the game with his 38-yard field goal to give the Crimson Tide a 3–0 halftime lead.

On the opening kickoff of the second half, Jimmy Johns forced the Bulldogs' Derek Pegues to fumble. Matt Miller recovered the fumble and returned it 15 yards for a touchdown and a 10–0 Alabama lead. On the ensuing Mississippi State drive, Michael Henig threw an interception to Rudy Griffin that was returned 17 yards for an Alabama touchdown and a 17–0 victory.

=== LSU ===
Team	1	2	3	4	OT	Total
• #5 LSU	0	0	10	0	6	16
#4 Alabama	3	7	0	0	3	13

- Location: Tuscaloosa, Alabama
- Game start: 2:42 p.m.
- Elapsed time: 3:45
- Game attendance: 81,018
- Game weather: 75°, sunny, winds SSE at 9 mph
- Referee: Matt Austin
- Television network: CBS

With College GameDay in town, in what was the first loss of the season for the Crimson Tide, the LSU Tigers defeated Alabama 16–13 in overtime. After Jamie Christensen missed a 46-yard field goal, on the following Alabama offensive possession in the first quarter he connected on a 28-yard field goal to give Alabama a 3–0 lead. The Crimson Tide then scored their only touchdown of the game early in the second quarter when Brodie Croyle threw an eight-yard touchdown strike to D. J. Hall to give Alabama a 10–0 halftime lead.

LSU tied the game up at 10–10 in the third quarter. They scored first on a one-yard Justin Vincent touchdown run and then on a 42-yard Chris Jackson field goal. After a pair of missed Jackson field goals in the fourth quarter for LSU, the game went into overtime. Alabama went on offense first and managed to score on a 34-yard Jamie Christensen field goal to take a 13–10 lead. On the Tigers' possession, JaMarcus Russell threw an 11-yard touchdown pass to Dwayne Bowe to give LSU the victory 16–13.

=== Auburn ===
Iron Bowl

Team	1	2	3	4	Total
#8 Alabama	0	7	3	8	18
• #11 Auburn	21	7	0	0	28

- Location: Auburn, Alabama
- Game start: 2:37 p.m.
- Elapsed time: 3:24
- Game attendance: 87,451
- Game weather: 60°, partly cloudy, winds SE at 7 mph
- Referee: Rocky Goode
- Television network: CBS

A week after Alabama suffered their first loss of the season, the Auburn Tigers defeated Alabama 28–18 in the 2005 edition of the Iron Bowl, keeping the Crimson Tide out of consideration for a BCS Bowl game. Auburn took a 21–0 lead in the first quarter. The Tigers scored first on a seven-yard touchdown pass from Brandon Cox to Benjamin Obomanu; second on an eight-yard Kenny Irons touchdown run; and third on a 45-yard Obomanu touchdown run. After a Prechae Rodriguez fumble was recovered by Charlie Peprah, Alabama scored their first points on the ensuing drive when Tim Castille scored on a one-yard touchdown run to make the score 21–7. Auburn responded later in the second quarter with a five-yard Cox touchdown pass to Cole Bennett to give the Tigers a 28–7 lead at halftime.

The Crimson Tide scored on their first possession of the second half on a 43-yard Jamie Christensen field goal. After Auburn was able to get a defensive stand late in the fourth to ice the game, Alabama did score a late touchdown on a one-yard John Parker Wilson touchdown run. A successful two-point conversion pass from Wilson to D. J. Hall made the final score 28–18. The Tigers' victory marked their fourth straight over the Crimson Tide.

=== Texas Tech ===
Cotton Bowl Classic

Team	1	2	3	4	Total
#18 Texas Tech	3	0	0	7	10
• #13 Alabama	7	0	3	3	13

- Location: Dallas, Texas
- Game start: 10:08 a.m.
- Elapsed time: 3:34
- Game attendance: 74,222
- Game weather: 63°, sunny, winds NNW at 10 mph
- Referee: Terry Leyden
- Television network: FOX

On December 4 officials from the Cotton Bowl announced their 2006 contest would feature the Crimson Tide competing against the Texas Tech Red Raiders of the Big 12 Conference. In a game that featured the nation's number one passing offense of Texas Tech against the nation's number one scoring defense of Alabama, the Crimson Tide won 13–10. Alabama scored their only touchdown of the game on just their second offensive play when Brodie Croyle threw a 76-yard touchdown pass to Keith Brown for a 7–0 lead. The Red Raiders responded later in the quarter with a 34-yard Alex Trlica field goal to cut the lead to 7–3. A scoreless second quarter saw the only scoring opportunities coming on a trio of failed field goal attempts. Alabama's Jamie Christensen missed a 39-yard field goal and the second blocked by Chris Hudler and recovered by Dwayne Slay. The Red Raiders' Trlica had a 37-yard field goal blocked by Mark Anderson as time expired to give Alabama the 7–3 halftime lead.

Christensen extended the Alabama lead to 10–3 early in the third quarter with his 31-yard field goal. Texas Tech then tied the game up at 10–10 late in the fourth quarter after Cody Hodges threw a 12-yard touchdown pass to Jarrett Hicks. The Crimson Tide responded on the following drive with Christensen kicking the game-winning field goal from 45-yards out as time expired to give Alabama the 13–10 victory.

== Coaching staff ==
Name	Position	Seasons at Alabama	Alma mater
Mike Shula	Head coach	3	Alabama (1987)
Chris Ball	Secondary	3	Missouri Western State (1986)
Bob Connelly	Offensive line	3	Texas A&M–Commerce (1994)
Charlie Harbison	Wide receivers	3	Gardner–Webb (1995)
Joe Kines	Defensive coordinator	3	Jacksonville State (1967)
David Rader	Offensive coordinator	3	Tulsa (1980)
Paul Randolph	Defensive line	3	Tennessee–Martin (1990)
Dave Ungerer	Special teams, Tight ends	3	Southern Connecticut State (1980)
Sparky Woods	Running backs	3	Carson–Newman (1976)
Buddy Wyatt	Defensive line	3	TCU (1989)
Gabe Giardina	Graduate assistant	2	Alabama (2004)

== Awards and honors ==
Following the SEC Championship Game, the conference named its award winners. DeMeco Ryans was named by the coaches' as the SEC Defensive Player of the Year. Kenneth Darby, Roman Harper and Ryans were named to the Coaches' All-SEC First Team. Mark Anderson, Tyrone Prothro and Freddie Roach were named to the Coaches' All-SEC Second Team. Antoine Caldwell, B. J. Stabler, Nick Walker and Bobby Greenwood were named to the 2005 Freshman All-SEC Team. In addition to his conference awards, Ryans was also named to the 2005 College Football All-America Team by AFCA and the Associated Press. He also won the Lott Trophy for 2005 season.

== NCAA sanctions ==
In October 2007, the athletic department discovered a potential NCAA-violation present throughout the athletics program. The violations stemmed from athletes from several sports, including football, receiving improper benefits as a result of a failure in the distribution system of textbooks to student athletes from the university. In essence, student athletes received textbooks for classes that they were not taking. Although it was not admitted that any excess textbooks amounted to an improper payment, it was possible that some athletes signed up for classes, received free textbooks, and then sold the textbooks. After a prolonged investigation, in June 2009 the NCAA ruled all athletes that received improper benefits related to the textbook distribution system were deemed ineligible. As such, as part of the penalties imposed on the football program, all victories which those included in the inquiry participated, were officially vacated from the all-time record. The penalty to vacate victories does not result in a loss (or forfeiture) of the affected contests or award a victory to the opponent. As such, all ten victories from the 2005 season (Middle Tennessee, Southern Mississippi, South Carolina, Arkansas, Florida, Ole Miss, Tennessee, Utah State, Mississippi State and Texas Tech) were vacated making the official record for the season zero wins and two losses (0–2).
