= Best play =

Best play may refer to:

- Best response, the game theoretic concept of a strategy that produces the most favorable outcome for a player
- Best Play (book), by chess theoretician Alexander Shashin

One of several awards:

- Tony Award for Best Play, an annual American award honoring Broadway theater productions
- Best Play ESPY Award, an annual award in the North American professional sports leagues
- Helpmann Award for Best Play, an annual award in Australian theatre
