= Best Play ESPY Award =

Annual athletic award

The Best Play ESPY Award has been conferred annually since 2002 on the play in a single regular season or playoff game contested professionally under the auspices of one of the four major leagues in the United States and Canada or collegiately under the auspices of the National Collegiate Athletic Association adjudged to be the most outstanding or best.

Between 2002 and 2004, the award voting panel comprised variously fans; sportswriters and broadcasters, sports executives, and retired sportspersons, termed collectively experts; and ESPN personalities, but balloting thereafter has been exclusively by fans over the Internet from amongst choices selected by the ESPN Select Nominating Committee. The ESPY Awards ceremony is conducted in July and awards conferred reflect performance and achievement over the twelve months previous to presentation. In the last few years, the format has been: sixteen plays are placed in brackets (1 vs. 16, 2 vs. 15, etc.) The winners in voting then advance to the second round. The winners go to the finals, where voters select Best Play. Since 2022, there has been no elimination format.

== List of winners ==
Year	Game or event	Competing teams	Date	Venue	League or governing body	Sport	Play
2002	Game three of the 2001 American League Division Series	New York Yankees Oakland Athletics	October 13, 2001	Network Associates Coliseum (Oakland, California)	Major League Baseball	Baseball	Assist by Yankees shortstop Derek Jeter to catcher Jorge Posada in the game's seventh inning (known thereafter as The Flip)
2003	2002 regular season Division I-A game	LSU Tigers Kentucky Wildcats	November 9, 2002	Commonwealth Stadium (Lexington, Kentucky)	National Collegiate Athletic Association	American football	Seventy-four-yard Hail Mary touchdown pass from Tigers quarterback Marcus Randall to wide receiver Devery Henderson upon the expiration of regulation time for a Tigers win (known thereafter as the Bluegrass Miracle).
2004	2003 regular season game	New Orleans Saints Jacksonville Jaguars	December 21, 2003	Alltel Stadium (Jacksonville, Florida)	National Football League	American football	Forty-two-yard forward pass from Saints quarterback Aaron Brooks to wide receiver Donte' Stallworth and laterals from Stallworth to wide receiver Michael Lewis to running back Deuce McAllister to wide receiver Jerome Pathon totaling thirty-three yards for a touchdown to draw the Saints within one point of the Jaguars upon the expiration of regulation time (known thereafter as the River City Relay).
2005	Class 4A state championship game	Eastview High School Lightning Hopkins High School Royals	March 20, 2005	Target Center (Minneapolis, Minnesota)	Minnesota State High School League	Basketball	Eighteen-foot two-point field goal by Royals shooting guard Blake Hoffarber while sitting down upon the expiration of a first overtime to draw the Royals equal with the Lightning and to force a second overtime.
2006	2005 regular season Division I-A game	Southern Miss Golden Eagles Alabama Crimson Tide	September 10, 2005	Bryant–Denny Stadium (Tuscaloosa, Alabama)	National Collegiate Athletic Association	American football	Fourth-down reception by Crimson Tide wide receiver Tyrone Prothro of a 42-yard pass from quarterback Brodie Croyle over Golden Eagles cornerback Jasper Faulk, with Prothro catching the ball behind Faulk's back.
2007	2007 Fiesta Bowl	Boise State Broncos Oklahoma Sooners	January 1, 2007	University of Phoenix Stadium (Glendale, Arizona)	National Collegiate Athletic Association Division I FBS	American football	Three-yard rush by Broncos running back Ian Johnson for a two-point conversion on a variant of the Statue of Liberty play executed from a play-action fake undertaken by quarterback Jared Zabransky for a Broncos overtime win.
2008	Super Bowl XLII	New York Giants New England Patriots	February 3, 2008	University of Phoenix Stadium (Glendale, Arizona)	National Football League	American football	Thirty-two-yard reception over Patriots strong safety Rodney Harrison by reserve wide receiver David Tyree of a third-down pass completed by Giants quarterback Eli Manning whilst under threat of sack from Patriots defensive ends Richard Seymour and Jarvis Green and outside linebacker Adalius Thomas, undertaken from the Giants' forty-four-yard line with one minute, fifteen seconds to play in the fourth quarter and the team trailing 14-10 (The Helmet Catch).
2009	Super Bowl XLIII	Pittsburgh Steelers Arizona Cardinals	February 1, 2009	Raymond James Stadium (Tampa, Florida)	National Football League	American football	Six-yard reception by Steelers wide receiver Santonio Holmes from quarterback Ben Roethlisberger with 35 seconds left giving the Steelers a 27-23 lead over the Cardinals.
2010	2009 regular season game	Minnesota Vikings San Francisco 49ers	September 27, 2009	Hubert H. Humphrey Metrodome (Minneapolis, Minnesota)	National Football League	American football	Thirty-two-yard reception by Vikings wide receiver Greg Lewis from quarterback Brett Favre with two seconds left giving the Vikings a 27-24 lead over the 49ers.
2011	2011 FIFA Women's World Cup Quarterfinal	United States Brazil	July 10, 2011	Rudolf-Harbig-Stadion (Dresden, Germany)	FIFA	Soccer	Goal by forward Abby Wambach off cross from midfielder Megan Rapinoe in the last minute of stoppage time, with the United States down 2–1 and playing a woman down in the quarterfinals of the World Cup. The United States would later go on to win in a penalty shoot-out to advance to the semifinals.
2012	2011–12 regular season game	Indiana Hoosiers Kentucky Wildcats	December 10, 2011	Assembly Hall (Bloomington, Indiana)	NCAA men's basketball	Basketball	Indiana junior forward Christian Watford sank a 3-pointer with no time left on the clock, leading the Hoosiers to a 73–72 upset over previously-unbeaten No. 1 Kentucky. Indiana fans stormed the floor of Assembly Hall as the win propelled the Hoosiers' comeback season to the Sweet 16.
2013	2013 Outback Bowl	South Carolina Gamecocks Michigan Wolverines	January 1, 2013	Raymond James Stadium (Tampa, Florida)	National Collegiate Athletic Association Football Bowl Subdivision	American football	South Carolina sophomore defensive end Jadeveon Clowney made a vicious tackle on Michigan running back Vincent Smith in the fourth quarter. The hit was so devastating that Smith lost both his helmet and the football; Clowney then recovered the fumble with one hand. On the next play, the Gamecocks scored a touchdown that gave them the momentum they needed to win the game.
2014	2013 Iron Bowl	Auburn Tigers Alabama Crimson Tide	November 30, 2013	Jordan–Hare Stadium (Auburn, Alabama)	National Collegiate Athletic Association Football Bowl Subdivision	American football	Auburn cornerback Chris Davis caught a missed Alabama field goal at the back of the end zone as time ran out and ran it back 109 (officially 100) yards for the game-winning touchdown. It kept Auburn's chances for the national championship alive (known thereafter as Kick Bama Kick by Auburn fans, or more neutrally as Kick Six).
2015	2014 regular season game	New York Giants Dallas Cowboys	November 23, 2014	MetLife Stadium (East Rutherford, New Jersey)	National Football League	American football	Giants wide receiver Odell Beckham Jr. caught a one-handed 43-yard touchdown reception hailed as the "catch of the year".
2016	2015 regular season game	Green Bay Packers Detroit Lions	December 3, 2015	Ford Field (Detroit, Michigan)	National Football League	American football	Packers quarterback Aaron Rodgers threw a 61-yard Hail Mary TD pass to Richard Rodgers to win 27-23. The Packers scored two touchdowns in the last three-plus minutes to win the game. Known as the Miracle in Motown.
2017	2016 divisional playoff game	Green Bay Packers Dallas Cowboys	January 15, 2017	AT&T Stadium (Arlington, Texas)	National Football League	American football	Aaron Rodgers threw a 35-yard pass to Jared Cook which Cook caught while he was going out of bounds. That play led to Mason Crosby kicking the field goal that won the game for the Packers 34–31.
2018	2018 NCAA Division I Women's Basketball Championship Game	Notre Dame Fighting Irish Mississippi State Bulldogs	April 1, 2018	Nationwide Arena (Columbus, Ohio)	NCAA	College basketball	Arike Ogunbowale hit a three-point shot as time expired to give the Fighting Irish a 61-58 victory over Mississippi State, which gave Notre Dame their second NCAA women's basketball title. Two days earlier, her buzzer-beater gave the Irish a win over the previously unbeaten UConn Huskies.
2019	2019 Collegiate Challenge	UCLA Bruins, Michigan State Spartans, California Bears, UC Davis Aggies	January 12, 2019	Honda Center (Anaheim, California)	NCAA	Artistic gymnastics	UCLA gymnast Katelyn Ohashi scored a perfect 10 in the floor exercises. The performance went viral, getting millions of views on YouTube. Earlier in the pre-show, it won the first-ever ESPY for Best Viral Moment. The play was the lowest-remaining seed in the field at Number 5.
2020	Not awarded due to the COVID-19 pandemic						
2021	2020 regular season game	Arizona Cardinals Buffalo Bills	November 15, 2020	State Farm Stadium (Glendale, Arizona)	National Football League	American football	With eleven seconds remaining in regulation play, Cardinals quarterback Kyler Murray threw a 43-yard Hail Mary pass into the end zone that wide receiver DeAndre Hopkins caught over three Bills defenders for the game-winning touchdown with one second remaining on the clock. Known as the Hail Murray.
2022	Women's Soccer bronze medal match at the 2020 Tokyo Olympics	United States women's soccer team Australia women's soccer team	August 5, 2021	Saitama Stadium (Saitama, Japan)	International Olympic Committee	Soccer	Megan Rapinoe scored a goal directly off a corner kick that propelled the U.S. to a bronze medal.
2023	2022 regular season game	Minnesota Vikings Buffalo Bills	November 13, 2022	Highmark Stadium (Orchard Park, New York)	National Football League	American football	Justin Jefferson made a one-handed catch for 32 yards on a fourth-and-18 pass from Kirk Cousins, wrestling the ball away from Bills cornerback Cam Lewis on the way to the ground, to help keep a Vikings drive alive in the fourth quarter with two minutes left.
2024	2023 AFC championship game	Baltimore Ravens Kansas City Chiefs	January 28, 2024	M&T Bank Stadium (Baltimore, Maryland)	National Football League	American football	Facing pressure, Lamar Jackson threw a pass that was batted into the air at the line of scrimmage, tracked down the floating football, caught it, and scrambled for a 13-yard gain and a first down.
2025	2024 regular season game	Philadelphia Eagles Jacksonville Jaguars	November 3, 2024	Lincoln Financial Field (Philadelphia, Pennsylvania)	National Football League	American football	Saquon Barkley caught a pass out of the backfield, broke an initial tackle attempt, and then utilized a spin move to evade a second defender. As a third defender closed in, Barkley leaped into the air and hurdled backward over him, keeping his balance to pick up a first down before going down around the 30-yard line.
2026	Game four of the 2026 NBA Finals	New York Knicks San Antonio Spurs	June 10, 2026	Madison Square Garden (New York, New York)	National Basketball Association	Basketball	With 5.7 seconds remaining, OG Anunoby inbounded the ball to Jalen Brunson, who attempted a three-pointer over Victor Wembanyama, but it bounced off the rim. Anunoby ran to the rim from the three-point line and completed the right-handed tip-in to give the Knicks a one-point lead with 1.2 seconds left on the clock.

== See also ==
- Best Game ESPY Award
