= Triandos Luke =

American football player (born 1981)

No. 10
- Position: Wide receiver

Personal information
- Born: December 24, 1981 (age 44); Phenix City, Alabama, U.S.
- Listed height: 5 ft 11 in (1.80 m)
- Listed weight: 195 lb (88 kg)

Career information
- College: Alabama
- NFL draft: 2004: 6th round, 171st overall pick

Career history
- Denver Broncos (2004); New York Giants (2006)*
- * Offseason or practice squad member only

Career NFL statistics
- Receptions: 6
- Receiving yards: 52
- Punt returns: 19
- Punt return yards: 135
- Kickoff returns: 15
- Kickoff return yards: 306
- Stats at Pro Football Reference

Triandos Luke (born December 24, 1981) is an American former professional football player who was a wide receiver for the Denver Broncos of the National Football League (NFL) in 2004. He was selected in the sixth round of the 2004 NFL draft with the 171st overall pick. He played college football for the Alabama Crimson Tide.

== College career ==
Luke attended the University of Alabama and was a Marketing Major and a standout in football. In football, he was a two-year starter and finished his college career with 90 receptions for 1,072 yards(11.91 yards per reception avg.) and nine touchdowns, and 13 kickoff returns for 256 yards(19.69 yards per kickoff return avg.). Luke also was the fastest player recorded in the 2004 NFL draft combine, running a blazing 4.30 seconds in the 40 yard dash.
