= Tyrone Prothro =

American football player (born 1984)

No. 4
- Position: Wide receiver

Personal information
- Born: May 24, 1984 (age 42); Heflin, Alabama, U.S.
- Listed height: 5 ft 9 in (1.75 m)
- Listed weight: 178 lb (81 kg)

Career information
- High school: Cleburne County (Heflin, Alabama)
- College: Alabama Crimson Tide (2003–2005)

Awards and highlights
- Second-team All-SEC (2005); ESPY for Best Play (2006)

Tyrone Prothro (born May 24, 1984) is a former American football wide receiver who played for the University of Alabama between 2003 and 2005.

== Early life ==
In high school, Prothro was an all state selection as Junior (2001) and Senior (2002). As a Junior, he played in the 2001 AHSAA Super Six 4-A Championship in 2002 they lost to State Champion UMS-Wright. In 2002, his senior year, Tyrone led Cleburne County back to the 4-A Semi-Finals where they lost to the North Jackson Chiefs.

== Collegiate career ==
Prior to the 2005 season, Prothro was named second-team All-SEC for return specialist and, despite his injury, was named to the second-team All-SEC for wide receiver at the end of the season.

Prothro won an award for Best Play at the 2006 ESPY Awards, as well as the Pontiac Game Changing Award of the Year for his outstanding catch, labeled by many as "the Catch", in which he caught the ball behind the head of Southern Mississippi's Jasper Faulk on a long pass from quarterback Brodie Croyle right before half-time in the game on September 10, 2005, in Bryant–Denny Stadium. Prothro's catch helped the Tide defeat Southern Mississippi 30–21. This play also has been rated by The Best Damn Sports Show Period as the Eighth Greatest Catch of All Time. It was the highest ranked college play on the list, and ranked even higher than such memorable plays as "The Catch".

In August 2008, Prothro received his bachelor's degree in the College of Human and Environmental Sciences.

=== Injury ===
Prothro suffered a season and ultimately career-ending injury in a game against the Florida Gators on October 1, 2005. Prothro made a leaping attempt to catch a pass from Brodie Croyle. As Prothro came back down to the turf, Florida Gators cornerback Dee Webb, while attempting to break up the pass, landed on Prothro's lower left leg which snapped it completely in half. This resulted in a complete break of Prothro's tibia and fibula. During the game's broadcast, play-by-play announcer Verne Lundquist compared the injury to former NFL quarterback Joe Theismann's infamous leg break suffered during a Monday Night Football game in 1985.

After 11 extensive surgeries, doctors were not able to repair Prothro's leg to the extent of furthering his playing career. On August 3, 2007, he was placed on a medical hardship scholarship and taken off the football roster with coach Nick Saban saying there was no way Prothro could play again.

== Post-football career ==
Prothro has worked for Regions Bank, an Account Manager for Coca-Cola, and a Toyota dealership in Tuscaloosa. On July 27, 2016, it was reported that Tyrone Prothro was hired by the Carolina Panthers as an intern coach for training camp, working with his former head coach and current offensive coordinator Mike Shula. He is now back in Tuscaloosa working at Wagners. He served as Grand Marshal for the Homecoming game against Ole Miss on October 16, 2010. Prothro is a plaintiff in O'Bannon v. NCAA, an anti-trust suit against the NCAA that went to trial in 2014. In June 2017, Prothro was hired as a WR coach and JV Basketball Coach at Spanish Fort High School in Spanish Fort, Alabama. On June 28, 2018, Tyrone Prothro was hired to coach receivers at 5A Jasper High school. He will also serve as a JV basketball coach.

== See also ==
- Alabama Crimson Tide football yearly statistical leaders
