= Steven Harris (wide receiver) =

American football player (born 1981)

No. 12
- Position: Wide receiver

Personal information
- Born: November 10, 1981 (age 44); Miami, Florida, U.S.
- Listed height: 5 ft 11 in (1.80 m)
- Listed weight: 185 lb (84 kg)

Career information
- College: Arkansas
- NFL draft: 2005: undrafted

Career history
- Washington Redskins (2005–2007); → Rhein Fire (2006)

Steven Harris is an American former football wide receiver. He was signed by the Washington Redskins as an undrafted free agent in 2005. He played college football at Arkansas.

== Professional career ==
=== Washington Redskins ===
Harris was placed on the injured reserve for the 2007 season after suffering a knee injury. He was waived by the team on March 17, 2008.
