= Eric Edwards (American football) =

American football player (born 1980)

No. 83
- Position: Tight end

Personal information
- Born: August 4, 1980 (age 46); Monroe, Louisiana, U.S.
- Listed height: 6 ft 5 in (1.96 m)
- Listed weight: 256 lb (116 kg)

Career information
- High school: Ouachita Christian (Monroe)
- College: LSU
- NFL draft: 2004: undrafted

Career history
- Arizona Cardinals (2004–2005); Washington Redskins (2006)*
- * Offseason or practice squad member only

Awards and highlights
- BCS national champion (2003)

Career NFL statistics
- Games played: 32
- Receptions: 17
- Receiving yards: 184
- Receiving touchdowns: 1
- Stats at Pro Football Reference

Timothy Eric Edwards (born August 4, 1980) is an American former professional football player who was a tight end for the Arizona Cardinals of the National Football League (NFL). He played college football for the LSU Tigers.
