= Jonathan Nichols (American football) =

American college football player (born 1981)

No. 86
- Position: Placekicker

Personal information
- Born: March 26, 1981 (age 45); Greenwood, Mississippi, U.S.
- Listed height: 6 ft 0 in (1.83 m)
- Listed weight: 175 lb (79 kg)

Career information
- High school: Pillow (Greenwood)
- College: Ole Miss (2001–2004)

Awards and highlights
- Lou Groza Award (2003); Third-team All-American (2003); First-team All-SEC (2003); Second-team All-SEC (2004)

Jonathan Nichols (born March 26, 1981) is an American former football placekicker who played college football for the Ole Miss Rebels, where he won the Lou Groza Award in 2003.

== Early life ==
Nichols was born in Greenwood, Mississippi, and attended Pillow Academy.

== College career ==
Nichols played college football for the Ole Miss Rebels from 2001 to 2004. He was awarded with the Lou Groza Award and named to the All-American team in 2003.
