= Brodie Croyle =

American football player (born 1983)

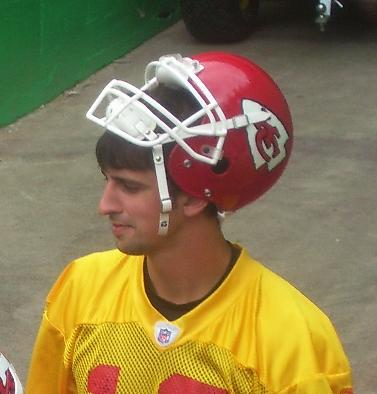
- Croyle while with the Kansas City Chiefs in 2008

No. 12, 14
- Position: Quarterback

Personal information
- Born: February 6, 1983 (age 43); Rainbow City, Alabama, U.S.
- Listed height: 6 ft 2 in (1.88 m)
- Listed weight: 206 lb (93 kg)

Career information
- High school: Westbrook Christian (Rainbow City)
- College: Alabama (2001–2005)
- NFL draft: 2006: 3rd round, 85th overall pick

Career history
- Kansas City Chiefs (2006–2010); Arizona Cardinals (2011)*
- * Offseason or practice squad member only

Career NFL statistics
- Passing attempts: 319
- Passing completions: 181
- Completion percentage: 56.7%
- TD–INT: 8–9
- Passing yards: 1,669
- Passer rating: 67.8
- Stats at Pro Football Reference

John Brodie Croyle (/krɔɪl/; born February 6, 1983) is an American former professional football player who was a quarterback in the National Football League (NFL). He was selected by the Kansas City Chiefs of the National Football League (NFL) in the third round of the 2006 NFL draft. He played college football for the University of Alabama from 2002 to 2005.

Despite being hindered by knee injuries in his senior season in high school, Croyle was a highly recruited prospect by Louisiana State University, Florida State University, and the University of Alabama. When Croyle was ready to announce his decision to attend Florida State, he changed his mind and chose Alabama, his father's alma mater, instead. In Croyle's four years playing for the Alabama Crimson Tide football team, he set numerous school records, and was a finalist for the Johnny Unitas Golden Arm Award. Croyle led the Crimson Tide to the 2006 Cotton Bowl Classic and was named the game's offensive MVP.

Though he had little playing time in his rookie season in the NFL, Croyle shared the starting position with Damon Huard in 2007. On November 18, Croyle started his first game, as the Chiefs' quarterback, against the Indianapolis Colts.

Croyle remained the Chiefs' starting quarterback for the remaining season despite losing all six games that he started. He was the incumbent starter heading into the 2008 regular season, but suffered a shoulder injury in the Chiefs' first game. Croyle returned in Week 7 but suffered a torn MCL and was ruled out for the remainder of the season. Croyle began the 2009 season once again, as the Chiefs' starting quarterback, filling in for injured Matt Cassel. Croyle was released by the Chiefs in 2011 and later signed with the Arizona Cardinals. On May 21, 2012, he announced his retirement.

Croyle is the only quarterback in Chiefs franchise history to start at least three games as a quarterback and not win a single game. He is also one of the 4 quarterbacks since 1960 (when starts first were tracked) to start at least 10 games in their career and not win a single game. He has the fewest passing yards and touchdowns in franchise history among quarterbacks with 10 or more starts. In 2015 he was named by FanSided as the 2nd worst quarterback in Chiefs franchise history.

== Early life ==
The son of John Croyle, a former defensive end for the University of Alabama, Croyle was born on February 6, 1983. He attended high school at Westbrook Christian School in Rainbow City, Alabama and became a Super-Prep All-American selection in football. In his sophomore season, Croyle passed for 3,787 yards and 44 touchdowns. That same season, he passed for 528 yards and seven touchdowns in one game. Croyle had an equally successful junior year passing for 2,838 yards and 38 touchdowns. Croyle led his team to the state championship that year, but the team lost by a field goal.

Entering his senior year, many scouts had ranked Croyle as high as the #2 quarterback in the country behind Joe Mauer, who would go on to play Major League Baseball. However, Croyle's high school career ended abruptly in the first game of his senior season against Glencoe High School after a hit by an opposing player which tore Croyle's anterior cruciate ligament (ACL), causing him to miss the remainder of his senior year. When he graduated, he held the Alabama state records for career passing yards with 9,323, and career touchdowns with 105. He set marks for most passing yards in a single season, passing yards in a single game, touchdown passes in a season, and touchdown passes in a game.

== College career ==
Despite the knee injury, Croyle received interest from members of the Southeastern Conference and the Atlantic Coast Conference, including Louisiana State and Florida State. Croyle showed interest in playing for Florida State due in part because of the team's offensive coordinator, Mark Richt. Croyle initially showed little interest in playing for Alabama after their head coach, Mike DuBose had recently been fired, but once Richt took the head coaching job with the Georgia Bulldogs, Croyle followed in his father's footsteps. On the night before he was to announce his college decision to play for Florida State, Croyle announced that he would instead play for the Alabama Crimson Tide. The Crimson Tide were not fazed by Croyle's rather serious ligament tear, for they felt he would heal well enough that his talent still warranted a spot on the roster. Croyle graduated early from high school and enrolled at the University of Alabama in January 2001. After red-shirting his freshman year at Alabama, Croyle earned a spot as the top backup in his second season behind senior starter Tyler Watts. Croyle's coaches voted for him as the Ozzie Newsome Most Improved Freshman after starting two games in 2002. After the 2002 season, Alabama head coach Dennis Franchione resigned to take the same position at Texas A&M. Washington State head coach Mike Price was hired to replace Franchione in January 2003.

Coach Price mentored Croyle throughout the 2003 spring drills and practice but was dismissed from the head coach position in May 2003 for his conduct off the field. Soon after, Mike Shula, quarterback coach for the Miami Dolphins and former quarterback of the Crimson Tide, was named head coach at Alabama. Croyle, now with his third head coach in as many years, had only a few weeks to prepare and practice under coach Shula's system. Despite starting all 11 games in 2003 as a sophomore, Croyle suffered a separated shoulder before half time of the fifth game. Croyle would start the next game against Georgia only to re-aggravate the injury, but still only sat out one game that season, and did not reveal to the public he had suffered from two cracked ribs. The Crimson Tide's 2003 season ended with a record of 4–9. He was subsequently named the Dixie Memorial Award winner as the club's MVP and won the Derrick Thomas Community Award. His 341 pass attempts on the season were the highest seasonal total in Crimson Tide history while his 16 touchdown passes tied the single-season mark.

Croyle started the 2004 season hoping to help his team improve on their last season's record of 4–9. Croyle started three games, completing 44-of-66 passes for 534 yards with six touchdowns. But during the third game of the season against Western Carolina University, Croyle tore his anterior cruciate ligament in his other knee. Croyle was forced to sit out the rest of the season, and the team finished with a 6–6 record.

Undaunted, he fully recovered from the injury in 2005 and started all 12 games as a senior; completing 202 of 339 passes for 2,499 yards with 14 touchdowns and four interceptions and one rushing touchdown. Croyle was sacked eleven times in a loss to Auburn. Croyle led the Crimson Tide to a #8 national ranking, a 10–2 record, and a 13–10 victory over Texas Tech in the Cotton Bowl Classic, where he shared the game's Most Valuable Player honors with teammate DeMeco Ryans. In his final season at Alabama, Croyle attempted a then-school-record 190 passes without an interception and a finalist for the Johnny Unitas Golden Arm Award as the nation's most outstanding senior quarterback. He became the first Alabama quarterback to start every game in a season since 1996. In the 2005 Iron Bowl, he was sacked 11 times, a series record.

Croyle's 2,499 passing yards in 2005 were the highest single-season total in Alabama's school history. His total 202 completions and 339 passing attempts rank as the second-best seasonal marks in school history. His 2,311 yards of total offense were the third-best seasonal mark in the history of the school, and his 1.18 interception percentage was the lowest single-season mark in school history as well.

== Professional career ==
Pre-draft measurables
| Height | Weight | Arm length | Hand span | 40-yard dash | 10-yard split | 20-yard split | 20-yard shuttle | Three-cone drill | Vertical jump | Broad jump | Wonderlic |
|---|---|---|---|---|---|---|---|---|---|---|---|
| 6 ft 2 1/2 in (1.89 m) | 205 lb (93 kg) | 31 1/8 in (0.79 m) | 9 7/8 in (0.25 m) | 4.91 s | 1.70 s | 2.83 s | 4.25 s | 7.34 s | 30.5 in (0.77 m) | 8 ft 8 in (2.64 m) | 24 |
All values from NFL Combine

=== Kansas City Chiefs ===
==== 2006 season ====
On April 29, 2006, the Kansas City Chiefs selected Croyle in the third round of the 2006 NFL draft as the 85th overall selection. He signed a four-year contract on July 28. Croyle's reputation for being injury prone caused him to drop into the third round of the draft.

Croyle played in only two games and saw few snaps in his rookie season. He completed 3-of-7 passes for 23 yards including two interceptions.

==== 2007 season ====
Croyle in my mind is going to be a good quarterback in this organization—no doubt about it.

— Herman Edwards in 2007.

In April 2007, nearly a year after Croyle was selected, Chiefs starting quarterback Trent Green was traded to the Miami Dolphins. In the months prior to the trade agreement, Green had stated that he was being treated unfairly on and off the field and that the pre-season quarterback competition was "weighted" towards Croyle. Head coach Herman Edwards, who was emphasizing a "youth movement" on the team's roster at the time, voiced his displeasure with Green's outspoken comments and simply said that he was "trying to create competition." Edwards indicated throughout the off-season that the Chiefs' starting quarterback position was up for grabs.

Throughout the offseason, Croyle was given every opportunity to win the starting job over Damon Huard. Against the New Orleans Saints while Huard sat out with a calf injury, Croyle completed only 5 of 17 passes for 45 yards as the Chiefs lost 30–7 and dropped to 0–3 in exhibition. but poor play in the pre-season led to Huard being named the Chiefs' starting quarterback for the season opener against the Houston Texans.

On October 7, in a regular season home game against the Jacksonville Jaguars, Huard was injured in the fourth quarter. Croyle threw six completions in thirteen attempts over the remainder of the game and threw his first NFL touchdown pass on the final play of regulation to Samie Parker in the 17–7 loss. The touchdown helped Kansas City avoid its first shut-out loss at home since 1994. Croyle's last-minute drive made him 6-for-13 for 83 yards and one touchdown.

On November 11, Croyle again substituted for an injured Huard in the final half of a 27–11 loss to the Denver Broncos. Croyle finished the game 17-for-30 for 162 yards, with one interception, in the loss that dropped Kansas City to 4–5 on the year. The following day, Croyle was named the starting quarterback for the Chiefs' upcoming game against the Indianapolis Colts, and made his first start on November 18 at the RCA Dome in a 13–10 loss. Croyle was the first quarterback drafted by Kansas City to start a game for the Chiefs since Todd Blackledge started a game in 1984. Croyle was 19-of-27 for 169 yards with one touchdown, but he lost a fumble that set up Adam Vinatieri's game-winning field goal.

Croyle started his first home game at Arrowhead Stadium on November 25 against the Oakland Raiders, but injured his back in the 20–17 loss. The injury sidelined Croyle for the following week's game against the San Diego Chargers, and Damon Huard started in Croyle's place. The injured quarterbacks continued to rotate playing time, and Croyle was again declared the starter for Kansas City's game against the Denver Broncos on December 9. The plan, barring injury, was for Croyle to start the remaining games of the 2007 season, so that coach Herm Edwards and his staff could better evaluate him moving forward into 2008. However, Croyle bruised his hand while trying to stop a defender from running an interception in for a touchdown and Damon Huard, who was the only active quarterback on the Chiefs' roster besides Croyle, filled in for the remainder of the game.

In the final game of the season, Croyle led the Chiefs to a 10–10 tie with the New York Jets with just three minutes remaining. However, the Chiefs lost 13–10 with a Jets field goal in overtime. Croyle would finish the game 20-of-43 for 195 yards.

Croyle lost all six games that he started for the Chiefs in the 2007 season. Despite his poor performance as a starter, Croyle's statistics were considered to be hard to evaluate.

==== 2008 season ====
Croyle entered the 2008 season as the Chiefs' starting quarterback. During the season opener against the New England Patriots on September 7, Croyle left the game in the third quarter with a bruised shoulder after being sacked by linebacker Adalius Thomas. Prior to the injury, Croyle completed 11 out of 19 with no touchdowns or interceptions. Two days after the game, the Chiefs signed quarterback Ingle Martin off the Tennessee Titans' practice squad to back up Damon Huard and Tyler Thigpen in Croyle's absence. In Croyle's absence, Damon Huard started the Chiefs' game against the Oakland Raiders the following week. Huard suffered a neck injury, so Tyler Thigpen became the third Chiefs starting quarterback in as many games.

After missing four games, Croyle returned to start against the Tennessee Titans in Week 7. He was injured on Kansas City's 14th play when he was sandwiched between two rushing defenders while throwing a pass early in the second quarter. He limped off the field. He slammed his helmet to the turf once he reached the sideline, then hobbled down a tunnel. After the game, Chiefs head coach Herman Edwards announced that Croyle would miss the remainder of the 2008 season.

==== 2009 season ====
After the Chiefs acquired quarterback Matt Cassel from the New England Patriots, Croyle entered training camp competing against Tyler Thigpen for a roster spot as backup quarterback. The first depth chart in training camp listed Croyle as the second quarterback ahead of Thigpen. Croyle entered the Chiefs' first preseason game of 2009 (against the Houston Texans) as the second quarterback and finished as the team's leading passer (12-of-18 for 145 yards) and looked poised throughout the evening to post a 91.2 quarterback rating. The Chiefs would go on to lose the game 16–10. After quarterback Matt Cassel was injured on August 29 against the Seattle Seahawks, Croyle started the final game of the preseason against the St. Louis Rams.

Croyle played the entire game at quarterback for the Chiefs' regular season opener against the Baltimore Ravens when Cassel was still unable to play. Despite completing 16-of-24 passes for 177 yards and two touchdowns, the Chiefs lost to the Ravens 38–24. However, the following week, Cassel became the starter again against the Oakland Raiders in Week 2.

==== 2010 season ====
In the 2010 season, Croyle appeared in two games and started one, which was Week 14 against the San Diego Chargers.

=== Arizona Cardinals ===
After leaving the Chiefs as a free agent, Croyle signed with the Arizona Cardinals on August 23, 2011. He was waived by the team on September 2, 2011.

On May 21, 2012, Croyle announced his retirement from the NFL.

== Career statistics ==
=== NFL ===
| Year | Team | Games | | Passing | | | | | | | | Rushing | | | |
| Year | Team | GP | GS | Cmp | Att | Pct | Yds | Avg | TD | Int | Rtg | Att | Yds | Avg | TD |
|---|---|---|---|---|---|---|---|---|---|---|---|---|---|---|---|
| 2006 | KC | 2 | 0 | 3 | 7 | 42.9 | 23 | 3.3 | 0 | 2 | 11.9 | 3 | −3 | −1.0 | 0 |
| 2007 | KC | 9 | 6 | 127 | 224 | 56.7 | 1,227 | 5.5 | 6 | 6 | 69.9 | 7 | 18 | 2.6 | 0 |
| 2008 | KC | 2 | 2 | 20 | 29 | 69.0 | 151 | 5.2 | 0 | 0 | 81.2 | — | — | — | — |
| 2009 | KC | 3 | 1 | 23 | 40 | 57.5 | 230 | 5.8 | 2 | 0 | 90.6 | — | — | — | — |
| 2010 | KC | 2 | 1 | 8 | 19 | 42.1 | 38 | 2.0 | 0 | 1 | 27.7 | — | — | — | — |
| Career | | 18 | 10 | 181 | 319 | 56.7 | 1,669 | 5.2 | 8 | 9 | 67.8 | 10 | 15 | 1.5 | 0 |

=== College ===
| Year | Team | Passing | | | | | | Rushing | | | |
| Year | Team | Cmp | Att | Yds | TD | Int | Rtg | Att | Yds | Avg | TD |
|---|---|---|---|---|---|---|---|---|---|---|---|
| 2002 | Alabama | 60 | 123 | 1,046 | 5 | 5 | 125.5 | 37 | −2 | −0.1 | 3 |
| 2003 | Alabama | 182 | 341 | 2,303 | 16 | 13 | 118.0 | 71 | 7 | 0.1 | 0 |
| 2004 | Alabama | 44 | 66 | 534 | 6 | 0 | 164.6 | 9 | −27 | −3.0 | 0 |
| 2005 | Alabama | 202 | 339 | 2,499 | 14 | 4 | 132.8 | 64 | −156 | −2.4 | 1 |
| Total | | 488 | 869 | 6,382 | 41 | 22 | 128.4 | 181 | −178 | −1.0 | 4 |

== Personal life ==
Croyle became the executive director for Big Oak Boys Ranch in Ohatchee, AL. and Big Oak Girls Ranch in Springville, AL. after his father, John Croyle, retired. Brodie lived on the Boys Ranch from the time of his birth until he became a freshman at The University of Alabama. Since taking over for his father, Croyle has been successful in the growth of Big Oak Ranch and ensuring the children grow up in a safe, Christian environment. and at the Drumm Farm in Independence, Missouri, a facility that provides foster children with a safe and stable home. Croyle serves as a spokesperson for Johnson County Court Appointed Special Advocate. On July 14, 2007, Croyle married Kelli Schutz, the 2005 winner of the America's Junior Miss competition. The couple met in Mobile, Alabama in 2006, while Croyle was preparing for the Senior Bowl.
