= Ramzee Robinson =

American football player (born 1984)

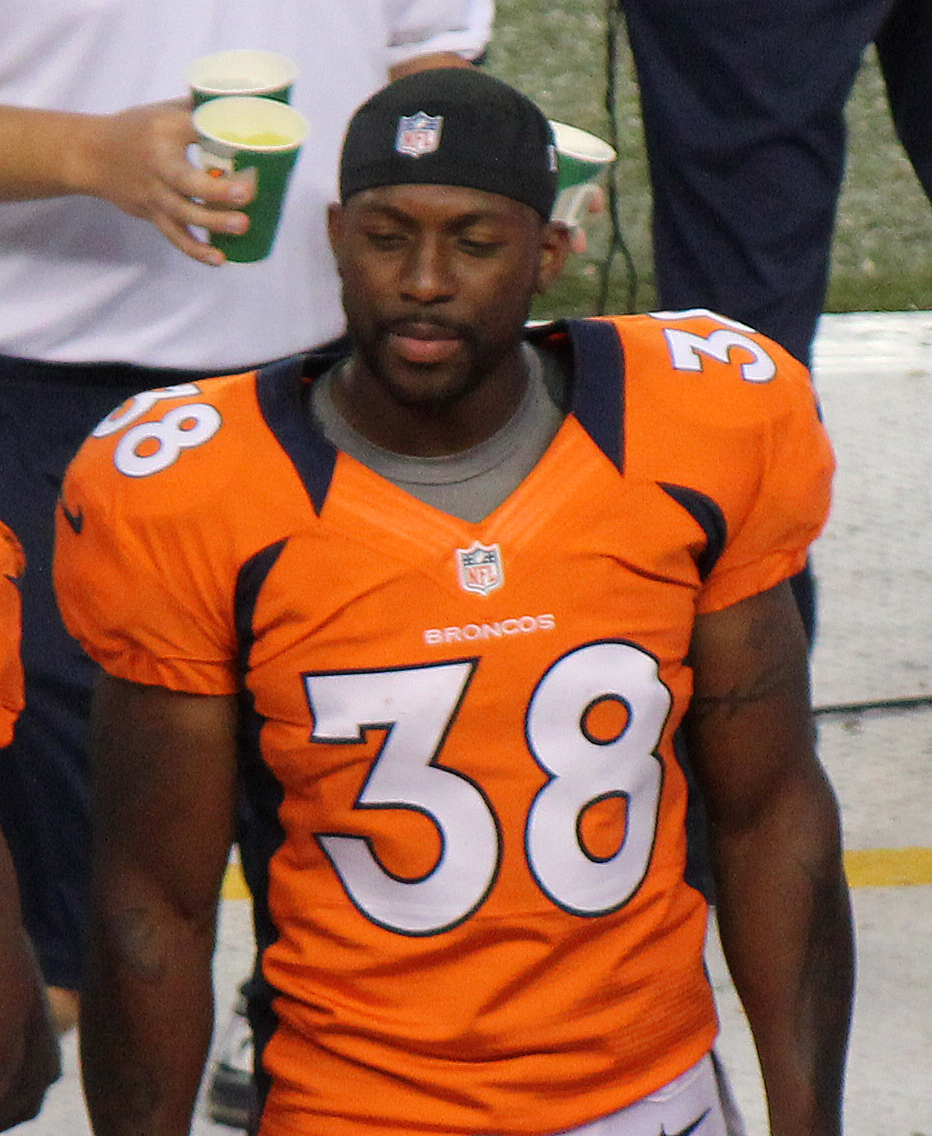
- Robinson with the Denver Broncos in 2012

No. 38, 28
- Position: Cornerback

Personal information
- Born: February 20, 1984 (age 42); Huntsville, Alabama, U.S.
- Listed height: 5 ft 10 in (1.78 m)
- Listed weight: 190 lb (86 kg)

Career information
- High school: S. R. Butler (Huntsville)
- College: Alabama
- NFL draft: 2007: 7th round, 255th overall pick

Career history
- Detroit Lions (2007–2008); Philadelphia Eagles (2009); Cleveland Browns (2009); Washington Redskins (2010)*; Cleveland Browns (2011)*; Denver Broncos (2012)*; Saskatchewan Roughriders (2012–2013)
- * Offseason or practice squad member only

Career NFL statistics
- Total tackles: 37
- Fumble recoveries: 1
- Pass deflections: 1
- Stats at Pro Football Reference

Ramzee Robinson (born February 20, 1984) is an American former professional football player who was a cornerback in the National Football League (NFL). He was selected by the Detroit Lions with the last pick in the 2007 NFL draft, earning the title of Mr. Irrelevant. He played college football for the Alabama Crimson Tide.

Robinson was also a member of the Philadelphia Eagles, Cleveland Browns, Washington Redskins, Denver Broncos, and Saskatchewan Roughriders. He served as the player engagement director for the Kansas City Chiefs until February 2025.

== Early life ==
Robinson attended S. R. Butler High School where he played quarterback and cornerback for the Rebels.

== College career ==
After redshirting in 2002, Robinson played four seasons with the Alabama Crimson Tide, making 50 appearances, including 36 starts. He recorded 143 tackles, including 3.5 tackles for a loss. Robinson broke up 22 pass attempts, forced 2 fumbles, and made 4 interceptions, including one for a touchdown in the 2006 season. He wore jersey number 1 and graduated in 2007 with a degree in business management.

== Professional career ==
=== Detroit Lions ===
Robinson was selected by the Detroit Lions with the last pick of the 2007 NFL draft (255th overall), earning him the title of Mr. Irrelevant. On June 29, 2007, Robinson signed a three-year contract with the Lions. However, on September 1, 2007, he was cut by the Lions and assigned to the practice squad where he wore jersey #38. He was promoted to the active roster due to injuries to other players at his position for the Lions' week 7 game against the Tampa Bay Buccaneers where he notched two tackles on special teams. However, the next week the Lions signed another cornerback and Robinson was again demoted to the practice squad. Robinson was again activated to the 53-man roster and given a jersey for the team's week 13 game on December 2.

Robinson taunted Green Bay Packers wide receiver James Jones after an incomplete pass thrown by Green Bay quarterback Aaron Rodgers during the third quarter of their December 28, 2008 game. He danced around and pointed at Jones after the fourth-and-10 play, resulting in a 15-yard dead-ball penalty against Detroit. This is the same game in which the Lions' made history as the first NFL team to go winless in the modern 16-game regular season, which started in 1977. His behavior garnered harsh criticism from the media.

On September 6, 2009, the Lions released Robinson.

=== Philadelphia Eagles ===
On November 11, 2009, Robinson was signed to a one-year contract with the Philadelphia Eagles after cornerback Ellis Hobbs was placed on injured reserve due to a neck injury. He was waived on December 1, 2009.

=== Cleveland Browns ===
Robinson was claimed off waivers by the Cleveland Browns on December 2, 2009.

=== Washington Redskins ===
Robinson was claimed off waivers by the Washington Redskins on June 20, 2010. Robinson was cut during final cuts on September 4, 2010

=== Denver Broncos ===
In March 2012, Robinson signed with the Broncos after spending 2010 and 2011 out of football. He was one of the final cuts.

=== Saskatchewan Roughriders ===
Robinson was released by the Roughriders on June 22, 2013.
