= James Wilhoit =

American football player (born 1983)

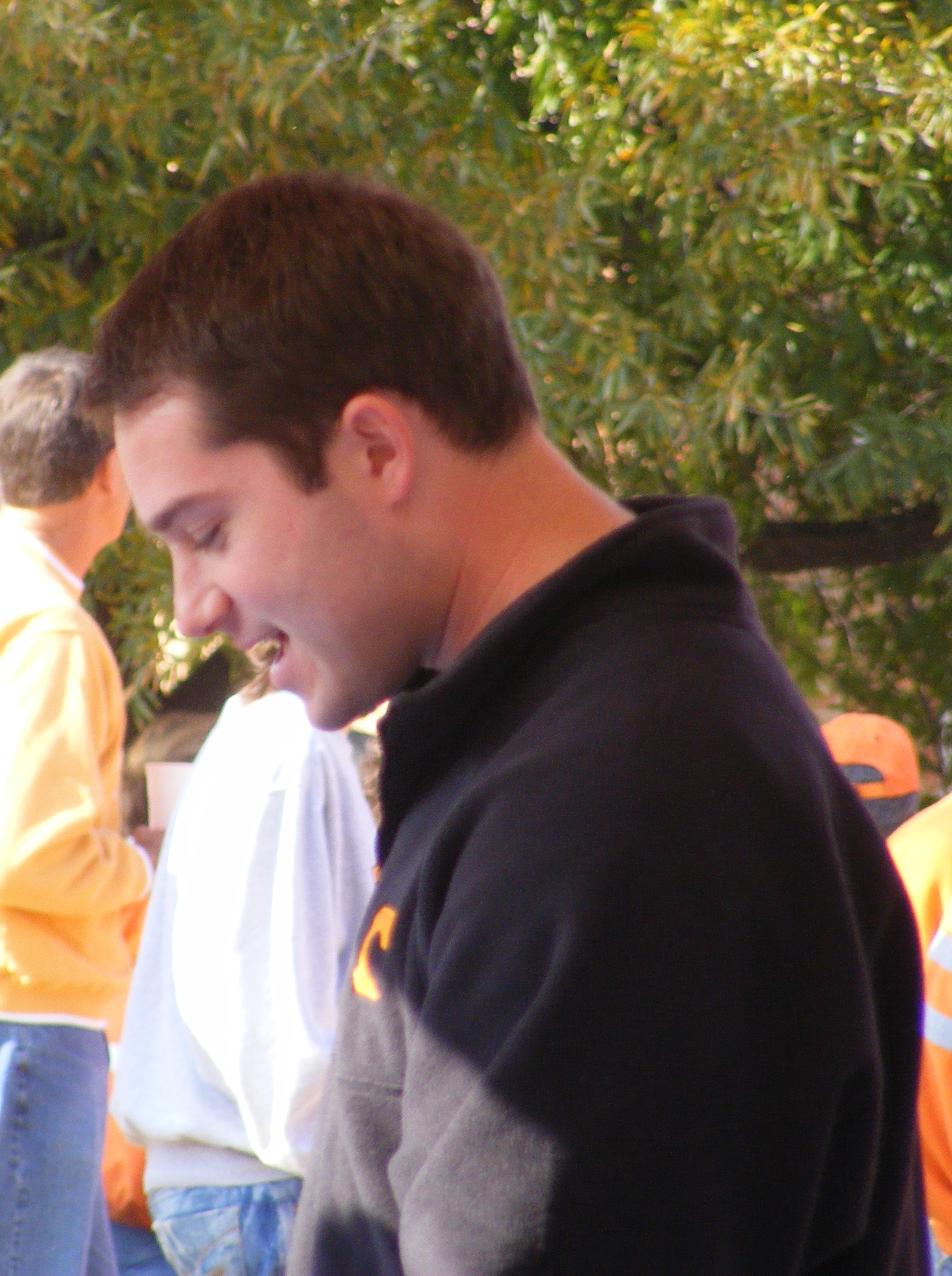
- Wilhoit in 2007

No. 6
- Position: Placekicker

Personal information
- Born: June 30, 1983 (age 43); Hendersonville, Tennessee, U.S.
- Listed height: 5 ft 10 in (1.78 m)
- Listed weight: 195 lb (88 kg)

Career information
- High school: Hendersonville (Hendersonville, Tennessee)
- College: Tennessee (2003–2006)
- NFL draft: 2007: undrafted

Career history
- Baltimore Ravens (2007)*; Kansas City Command (2012)
- * Offseason or practice squad member only

James Howell Wilhoit II (born June 30, 1983) is a former American professional football placekicker. He was a member of the NFL Baltimore Ravens in 2007 and the AFL Kansas City Command in 2012. He played college football with the Tennessee Volunteers.

== High school ==
Wilhoit attended Hendersonville High School in Hendersonville, Tennessee where he received All-American honors from PARADE, PrepStar, SuperPrep, Student Sports and Borderwars.com.

== College ==
Wilhoit redshirted his freshman year, but went on to become a four-year starter at Tennessee where he handled field goal and extra point attempts and kickoffs. Wilhoit was known for ability to make field goals in the clutch during his four-year career. When he left Tennessee he was the second leading scorer in school history. His last-minute field goals included a 50-yard field goal with 6 seconds left to give Tennessee to a 30–28 victory over Florida in 2004. Earlier in the quarter he missed an extra point that would have tied the game. Wilhoit ranks in the all-time top five in several kicking categories at UT. He made 59 of 82 field goal attempts (72%) and kicked 47% of his kickoffs for touchbacks during his career. He became the 2nd all-time leading scorer at Tennessee with 325 points. He led the SEC in scoring with 96 points in 2006 and was ranked 7th in SEC history.

== Professional football career ==
Wilhoit was not selected in the 2007 NFL draft, but signed with the Baltimore Ravens as a rookie free agent on May 4, 2007. He was later released from the team in July shortly before the 2007 NFL preseason began. In late 2007, Wilhoit signed with the New All American Football League that never played a game. He helped promote the league by doing several autograph signings. He also played for the Kansas City Command of the Arena Football League in 2012, converting 8 of 21 field goal attempts and 62 of 77 extra point attempts.

== Coaching career ==
Wilhoit studied under Special Teams Coach Gary Zauner for six months to learn his kicking and punting techniques. In addition to Coach Zauner, he has trained under Coach Bill Renner in Chapel Hill, North Carolina.

This intern study period was conducted at Tennessee from 2010–11.

In 2008, Wilhoit founded the Wilhoit Kicking Academy, a program offering coaching services to young Tennessee kicking athletes. He joined the NFL Tennessee Titans in 2021 as the team's kicking specialist, serving in the post for the 2022 season.

== Honors ==
- 2006 Lou Groza Place Kicker Award (semifinalist)
- 2006 All-SEC
- 2005 Academic All-SEC
- SEC Special Teams Player of the Week (September 18, 2004)
- 2004 Academic All-SEC
- 2003 Freshman All-America Scripps Howard/FWAA and The Sporting News (2nd)
- 2003 Freshman All-SEC
- SEC Freshman Academic Honor Roll
