= Tim Castille =

American football player and coach (born 1984)

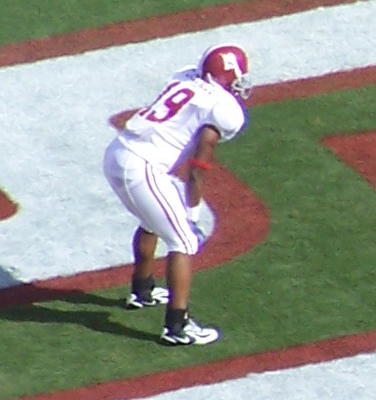
- Castille with the Alabama Crimson Tide in 2006

No. 46
- Position: Fullback

Personal information
- Born: May 29, 1984 (age 42); Birmingham, Alabama, U.S.
- Listed height: 5 ft 11 in (1.80 m)
- Listed weight: 242 lb (110 kg)

Career information
- College: Alabama
- NFL draft: 2007: undrafted

Career history

Playing
- Arizona Cardinals (2007–2008); Kansas City Chiefs (2009–2010)

Coaching
- Alabama Crimson Tide (2012–2013) Graduate assistant; Alabama Crimson Tide (2014) Analyst

Career NFL statistics
- Rushing attempts: 19
- Rushing yards: 58
- Receptions: 18
- Receiving yards: 91
- Receiving touchdowns: 1
- Stats at Pro Football Reference

Timothy Nehemiah Castille (born May 29, 1984) is an American football coach and former fullback. He was signed by the Arizona Cardinals as an undrafted free agent in 2007. He played college football at Alabama.

== Professional career ==
=== Arizona Cardinals ===
Castille was signed by the Arizona Cardinals as an undrafted free agent in 2007. He played in all 14 of the Cardinals games in 2008. He was released on September 4, 2009.

=== Kansas City Chiefs ===
Castille signed with the Kansas City Chiefs on November 17, 2009. He participated in 17 Chiefs games from 2009 to 2010 scoring one touchdown by reception in 2009. He was declared a free agent on July 25, 2011.

== Coaching career ==
He spent 2012 as a graduate assistant football coach under Nick Saban at Alabama. In 2015, he joined Thompson High School as a running backs coach and strength and conditioning coordinator.

== Personal life ==
Castille's father, Jeremiah, also played college football at Alabama before spending six seasons in the NFL with the Tampa Bay Buccaneers and Denver Broncos. Castille's brother, Simeon, was a cornerback in the NFL and United Football League between 2008 and 2014. Simeon also played college football at Alabama.
