= List of Alabama Crimson Tide bowl games =

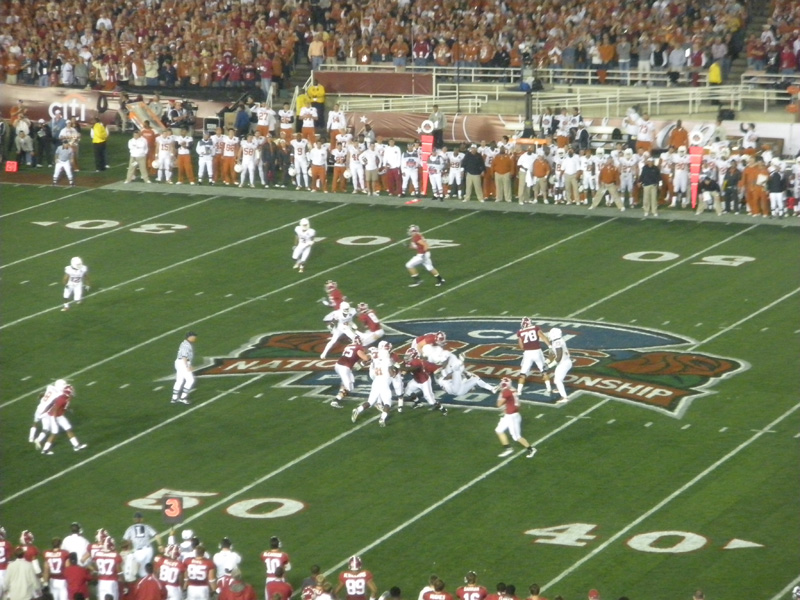
50-yard line action during the 2010 BCS National Championship Game

The Alabama Crimson Tide football team competes as part of the NCAA Division I Football Bowl Subdivision (FBS), representing the University of Alabama in the Western Division of the Southeastern Conference (SEC). Since the establishment of the team in 1892, Alabama has appeared in 75 bowl games. Included in these games are 40 combined appearances in the traditional "big four" bowl games (the Rose, Sugar, Cotton, and Orange), 6 Bowl Championship Series (BCS) game appearances (including three victories in the BCS National Championship Game) and six appearances in the College Football Playoff, and three victories in the College Football Playoff National Championship Game.

Alabama's first bowl game was in 1926, when Wallace Wade led them to the first of three Rose Bowls during his tenure and defeated Washington 20–19. Taking over for Wade following the 1930 season, between 1931 and 1946 Frank Thomas led Alabama to six bowl appearances including three Rose, and one trip each to the Cotton, Orange and Sugar Bowls. After Thomas, Harold Drew led Alabama to the Sugar, Orange and Cotton Bowls between 1947 and 1954. After a five-year bowl absence, Alabama made the first of 24 consecutive bowl appearances under Paul "Bear" Bryant in the 1959 Liberty Bowl. From 1959 to 1982, Bryant led the Crimson Tide to eight Sugar, five Orange, four Cotton, four Liberty, two Bluebonnet and one Gator Bowls.

After Bryant retired, Ray Perkins extended Alabama's consecutive bowl game streak to 25 years with a victory in the 1983 Sun Bowl. However, the streak ended when the 1984 team finished the season with a record of five wins and six losses and failed to qualify for a bowl for the first time in 26 years. The bowl absence lasted only one season as Perkins led the Crimson Tide to wins in both the Aloha and Sun Bowls before he resigned as head coach following the 1986 season. Bill Curry continued the bowl tradition and led the Crimson Tide to Hall of Fame, Sun and Sugar Bowl appearances in his three seasons as head coach. After Curry, Gene Stallings took Alabama to the Fiesta, Blockbuster, Gator, Citrus and Outback Bowls. Stallings also led the Crimson Tide to victory in the first Bowl Coalition national championship game with a 34–13 victory over Miami in the Sugar Bowl. In August 1995, as part of the penalty imposed by the NCAA for rules violations, Alabama was ruled ineligible to participate in the 1995 bowl season.

Following the retirement of Stallings, Mike DuBose was hired as head coach. After failing to qualify for a bowl game in 1997, DuBose led the Crimson Tide to the inaugural Music City Bowl and Alabama's first BCS bowl berth in the Orange Bowl. After again failing to qualify for a bowl in 2000, DuBose was fired and Dennis Franchione was hired as head coach. In his first season, Franchione led Alabama to the Independence Bowl. In February 2002, the NCAA found Alabama violated multiple rules, and as part of its penalty a two-year bowl ban was imposed to include both the 2002 and 2003 seasons. Eligible again to compete in bowl games, Mike Shula led Alabama to the Music City Bowl and a victory in the Cotton Bowl. However, in 2009, Alabama was again found to have violated NCAA rules between 2005 and 2007 and as part of their penalty, the 2006 Cotton Bowl Classic victory was officially vacated. In the week following the 2006 loss to Auburn, Shula was fired and Joe Kines served as interim head coach for the Independence Bowl loss.

In January 2007, Nick Saban was hired as head coach, and has led the Crimson Tide to 15 bowl appearances in his twelve seasons at Alabama. After defeating Colorado in the Independence Bowl, Saban led Alabama to their second BCS bowl against Utah in the Sugar Bowl. In 2009, Saban led the Crimson Tide to the BCS National Championship Game, and defeated Texas 37–21 to clinch the program's first national title of the BCS era. A year after Alabama defeated Michigan State in the 2011 Capital One Bowl, the Crimson Tide defeated LSU in the BCS National Championship Game to clinch the program's second national title of the BCS era. The following season, the Crimson Tide won their second consecutive BCS National Championship Game by a final score of 42–14 over Notre Dame. In their latest bowl appearance, Alabama defeated Ohio State in the 2021 College Football Playoff National Championship. The win brings Alabama's overall bowl record to 44 wins, 26 losses, and 3 ties, placing the Crimson Tide in first place among all FBS schools for both bowl appearances and victories.

== Key ==
General
†	Bowl game record attendance
‡	Former bowl game record attendance
*	Denotes national championship game
§	Denotes College Football Playoff game

Results
W	Win
L	Loss
T	Tie

== Bowl games ==
List of bowl games showing bowl played in, score, date, season, opponent, stadium, location, attendance and head coach (Note: Statistics correct as of 2012–13 NCAA football bowl games.)
#	Bowl	Score (Note: Results are sortable first by whether the result was an Alabama win, loss or tie and then second by the margin of victory.)	Date	Season (Note: Links to the season article for the Alabama team that competed in the bowl for that year.)	Opponent (Note: Links to the season article for the opponent that Alabama competed against in the bowl for that year when available or to their general page when unavailable.)	Stadium	Location	Attendance	Head coach
1	Rose Bowl	W 20–19	January 1, 1926	1925	Washington Huskies	Rose Bowl	Pasadena	50,000	Wallace Wade
2	Rose Bowl	T 7–7	January 1, 1927	1926	Stanford	Rose Bowl	Pasadena	57,417^{‡}	Wallace Wade
3	Rose Bowl	W 24–0	January 1, 1931	1930	Washington State Cougars	Rose Bowl	Pasadena	60,000	Wallace Wade
4	Rose Bowl	W 29–13	January 1, 1935	1934	Stanford Indians	Rose Bowl	Pasadena	84,474^{‡}	Frank Thomas
5	Rose Bowl	L 0–13	January 1, 1938	1937	California Golden Bears	Rose Bowl	Pasadena	90,000^{‡}	Frank Thomas
6	Cotton Bowl Classic	W 29–21	January 1, 1942	1941	Texas A&M Aggies	Cotton Bowl	Dallas	38,000	Frank Thomas
7	Orange Bowl	W 37–21	January 1, 1943	1942	Boston College Eagles	Orange Bowl	Miami	25,166	Frank Thomas
8	Sugar Bowl	L 26–29	January 1, 1945	1944	Duke Blue Devils	Tulane Stadium	New Orleans	72,000	Frank Thomas
9	Rose Bowl	W 34–14	January 1, 1946	1945	USC Trojans	Rose Bowl	Pasadena	93,000	Frank Thomas
10	Sugar Bowl	L 7–27	January 1, 1948	1947	Texas Longhorns	Tulane Stadium	New Orleans	72,000	Harold Drew
11	Orange Bowl	W 61–6	January 1, 1953	1952	Syracuse Orangemen	Orange Bowl	Miami	66,280^{‡}	Harold Drew
12	Cotton Bowl Classic	L 6–28	January 1, 1954	1953	Rice Owls	Cotton Bowl	Dallas	75,504^{‡}	Harold Drew
13	Liberty Bowl	L 0–7	December 19, 1959	1959	Penn State Nittany Lions	Philadelphia Municipal Stadium (Note: This stadium was built for the 1926 Sesquicentennial Exposition and originally known as Sesquicentennial Stadium. After the end of the exposition, it was renamed Philadelphia Municipal Stadium, retaining that name until 1964. It was renamed John F. Kennedy Stadium in the wake of Kennedy's assassination, and retained that name until its demolition in 1992.)	Philadelphia	36,211^{‡}	Bear Bryant
14	Bluebonnet Bowl	T 3–3	December 17, 1960	1960	Texas Longhorns	Rice Stadium	Houston	68,000^{†}	Bear Bryant
15	Sugar Bowl	W 10–3	January 1, 1962	1961	Arkansas Razorbacks	Tulane Stadium	New Orleans	82,910^{‡}	Bear Bryant
16	Orange Bowl	W 17–0	January 1, 1963	1962	Oklahoma Sooners	Orange Bowl	Miami	72,880	Bear Bryant
17	Sugar Bowl	W 12–7	January 1, 1964	1963	Ole Miss Rebels	Tulane Stadium	New Orleans	80,785	Bear Bryant
18	Orange Bowl	L 17–21	January 1, 1965	1964	Texas Longhorns	Orange Bowl	Miami	72,647	Bear Bryant
19	Orange Bowl	W 39–28	January 1, 1966	1965	Nebraska Cornhuskers	Orange Bowl	Miami	72,214	Bear Bryant
20	Sugar Bowl	W 34–7	January 2, 1967	1966	Nebraska Cornhuskers	Tulane Stadium	New Orleans	82,000	Bear Bryant
21	Cotton Bowl Classic	L 16–20	January 1, 1968	1967	Texas A&M Aggies	Cotton Bowl	Dallas	75,504	Bear Bryant
22	Gator Bowl	L 10–35	December 28, 1968	1968	Missouri Tigers	Gator Bowl Stadium	Jacksonville	68,011	Bear Bryant
23	Liberty Bowl	L 33–47	December 13, 1969	1969	Colorado Buffaloes	Memphis Memorial Stadium (Note: Originally called Memphis Memorial Stadium, in 1976 it was renamed Liberty Bowl Memorial Stadium.)	Memphis	50,042^{‡}	Bear Bryant
24	Bluebonnet Bowl	T 24–24	December 31, 1970	1970	Oklahoma Sooners	Houston Astrodome	Houston	53,829	Bear Bryant
25	Orange Bowl	L 6–38	January 1, 1972	1971	Nebraska Cornhuskers	Orange Bowl	Miami	78,151	Bear Bryant
26	Cotton Bowl Classic	L 13–17	January 1, 1973	1972	Texas Longhorns	Cotton Bowl	Dallas	72,000	Bear Bryant
27	Sugar Bowl	L 23–24	December 31, 1973	1973	Notre Dame Fighting Irish	Tulane Stadium	New Orleans	85,161^{†}	Bear Bryant
28	Orange Bowl	L 11–13	January 1, 1975	1974	Notre Dame Fighting Irish	Orange Bowl	Miami	71,801	Bear Bryant
29	Sugar Bowl	W 13–6	December 31, 1975	1975	Penn State Nittany Lions	Louisiana Superdome	New Orleans	75,212	Bear Bryant
30	Liberty Bowl	W 36–6	December 20, 1976	1976	UCLA Bruins	Memphis Memorial Stadium	Memphis	52,736^{‡}	Bear Bryant
31	Sugar Bowl	W 35–6	January 2, 1978	1977	Ohio State Buckeyes	Louisiana Superdome	New Orleans	76,811	Bear Bryant
32	Sugar Bowl	W 14–7	January 1, 1979	1978	Penn State Nittany Lions	Louisiana Superdome	New Orleans	76,824	Bear Bryant
33	Sugar Bowl	W 24–9	January 1, 1980	1979	Arkansas Razorbacks	Louisiana Superdome	New Orleans	77,486	Bear Bryant
34	Cotton Bowl Classic	W 30–2	January 1, 1981	1980	Baylor Bears	Cotton Bowl	Dallas	74,281	Bear Bryant
35	Cotton Bowl Classic	L 12–14	January 1, 1982	1981	Texas Longhorns	Cotton Bowl	Dallas	73,243	Bear Bryant
36	Liberty Bowl	W 21–15	December 29, 1982	1982	Illinois Fighting Illini	Liberty Bowl Memorial Stadium	Memphis	54,123	Bear Bryant
37	Sun Bowl	W 28–7	December 24, 1983	1983	SMU Mustangs	Sun Bowl Stadium	El Paso	41,412^{‡}	Ray Perkins
38	Aloha Bowl	W 24–3	December 28, 1985	1985	USC Trojans	Aloha Stadium	Honolulu	35,183	Ray Perkins
39	Sun Bowl	W 28–6	December 25, 1986	1986	Washington Huskies	Sun Bowl Stadium	El Paso	48,722	Ray Perkins
40	Hall of Fame Bowl (Note: The Outback Bowl was previously known as the Hall of Fame Bowl (1986–1995).)	L 24–28	January 2, 1988	1987	Michigan Wolverines	Tampa Stadium	Tampa	60,156^{‡}	Bill Curry
41	Sun Bowl	W 29–28	December 24, 1988	1988	Army	Sun Bowl Stadium	El Paso	48,719	Bill Curry
42	Sugar Bowl	L 25–33	January 1, 1990	1989	Miami Hurricanes	Louisiana Superdome	New Orleans	77,452	Bill Curry
43	Fiesta Bowl	L 7–34	January 1, 1991	1990	Louisville Cardinals	Sun Devil Stadium	Tempe	69,098	Gene Stallings
44	Blockbuster Bowl (Note: The Camping World Bowl was at the time known as the Blockbuster Bowl (1990–1993).)	W 30–25	December 28, 1991	1991	Colorado Buffaloes	Joe Robbie Stadium	Miami Gardens	52,644	Gene Stallings
45	Sugar Bowl*	W 34–13	January 1, 1993	1992	Miami Hurricanes	Louisiana Superdome	New Orleans	76,789	Gene Stallings
46	Gator Bowl	W 24–10	December 31, 1993	1993	North Carolina Tar Heels	Gator Bowl Stadium	Jacksonville	67,205	Gene Stallings
47	Citrus Bowl (Note: The Citrus Bowl has been known as: the Tangerine Bowl (1947–1982), Florida Citrus Bowl (1983–1993), CompUSA Florida Citrus Bowl (1994–1999), OurHouse.com Florida Citrus Bowl (2000), Capital One Florida Citrus Bowl (2001–2002), Capital One Bowl (2003–2014), Buffalo Wild Wings Citrus Bowl (2015–2017), Citrus Bowl presented by Overton's (2018), and VRBO Citrus Bowl (2019–present).)	W 24–17	January 2, 1995	1994	Ohio State Buckeyes	Citrus Bowl (Note: The Citrus Bowl stadium has been known as Camping World Stadium since 2016.)	Orlando	71,195	Gene Stallings
48	Outback Bowl	W 17–14	January 1, 1997	1996	Michigan Wolverines	Tampa Stadium	Tampa	53,161	Gene Stallings
49	Music City Bowl	L 7–38	December 28, 1998	1998	Virginia Tech Hokies	Vanderbilt Stadium	Nashville	41,248^{‡}	Mike DuBose
50	Orange Bowl	L 34–35	January 1, 2000	1999	Michigan Wolverines	Pro Player Stadium (Note: Originally called Joe Robbie Stadium, in 1996 it was renamed Pro Player Stadium after naming rights were sold, and it retained the Pro Player moniker through the 2005 season. It was later known as Sun Life Stadium, and is now known as Hard Rock Stadium.)	Miami Gardens	70,461	Mike DuBose
51	Independence Bowl	W 14–13	December 27, 2001	2001	Iowa State Cyclones	Independence Stadium	Shreveport	45,627	Dennis Franchione
52	Music City Bowl	L 16–20	December 31, 2004	2004	Minnesota Golden Gophers	The Coliseum (Note: This stadium opened in 1999 as Adelphia Coliseum. In 2002, after Adelphia missed a required payment on its naming rights contract and later filed for bankruptcy, the contract was terminated and the stadium became The Coliseum. It was renamed LP Field in 2006 and Nissan Stadium in 2015.)	Nashville	66,089^{‡}	Mike Shula
53	Cotton Bowl Classic (Note: In March 2009, the NCAA ruled that Alabama had to vacate its 2006 Cotton Bowl Classic victory due to sanctions stemming from textbook-related infractions discovered during the 2007 season. After an unsuccessful appeal to the NCAA Division I Infractions Appeals Committee, the 2006 Cotton Bowl Classic victory was officially vacated. As the penalty to vacate the victory did not result in a loss (or forfeiture) of the contest or award a victory to the opponent, Texas Tech still counts the game as a loss in its overall records.)	W 13–10	January 1, 2006	2005	Texas Tech Red Raiders	Cotton Bowl	Dallas	74,222	Mike Shula
54	Independence Bowl	L 31–34	December 28, 2006	2006	Oklahoma State Cowboys	Independence Stadium	Shreveport	45,054	Joe Kines (Note: Mike Shula coached the entire 2006 regular season with Joe Kines serving as the interim head coach for the bowl game.)
55	Independence Bowl	W 30–24	December 30, 2007	2007	Colorado Buffaloes	Independence Stadium	Shreveport	47,043	Nick Saban
56	Sugar Bowl	L 17–31	January 2, 2009	2008	Utah Utes	Louisiana Superdome	New Orleans	71,872	Nick Saban
57	BCS National Championship Game*	W 37–21	January 7, 2010	2009	Texas Longhorns	Rose Bowl	Pasadena	94,906^{†}	Nick Saban
58	Capital One Bowl	W 49–7	January 1, 2011	2010	Michigan State Spartans	Citrus Bowl	Orlando	61,519	Nick Saban
59	BCS National Championship Game*	W 21–0	January 9, 2012	2011	LSU Tigers	Mercedes-Benz Superdome (Note: On October 3, 2011, it was announced that Mercedes-Benz purchased naming rights to the Superdome effective October 23, 2011. From 1976 through 2011 the facility was called the Louisiana Superdome.)	New Orleans	78,237	Nick Saban
60	BCS National Championship Game*	W 42–14	January 7, 2013	2012	Notre Dame Fighting Irish	Sun Life Stadium	Miami Gardens	80,120	Nick Saban
61	Sugar Bowl	L 31–45	January 2, 2014	2013	Oklahoma Sooners	Mercedes-Benz Superdome	New Orleans	70,473	Nick Saban
62	Sugar Bowl§	L 35–42	January 1, 2015	2014	Ohio State Buckeyes	Mercedes-Benz Superdome	New Orleans	74,682	Nick Saban
63	Cotton Bowl Classic§	W 38–0	December 31, 2015	2015	Michigan State Spartans	AT&T Stadium	Arlington	82,812	Nick Saban
64	CFP National Championship*	W 45–40	January 11, 2016	2015	Clemson Tigers	University of Phoenix Stadium (Note: This stadium opened in 2008 as Cardinals Stadium, but shortly thereafter was renamed University of Phoenix Stadium, retaining that name until 2018. It is now known as State Farm Stadium.)	Glendale	75,765	Nick Saban
65	Peach Bowl§	W 24–7	December 31, 2016	2016	Washington Huskies	Georgia Dome	Atlanta	79,996	Nick Saban
66	CFP National Championship*	L 31–35	January 9, 2017	2016	Clemson Tigers	Raymond James Stadium	Tampa	74,512	Nick Saban
67	Sugar Bowl§	W 24–6	January 1, 2018	2017	Clemson Tigers	Mercedes-Benz Superdome	New Orleans	72,360	Nick Saban
68	CFP National Championship*	W 26–23	January 8, 2018	2017	Georgia Bulldogs	Mercedes-Benz Stadium	Atlanta	77,430	Nick Saban
69	Orange Bowl§	W 45–34	December 29, 2018	2018	Oklahoma Sooners	Hard Rock Stadium	Miami Gardens	66,203	Nick Saban
70	CFP National Championship*	L 16–44	January 7, 2019	2018	Clemson Tigers	Levi's Stadium	Santa Clara	74,814	Nick Saban
71	Citrus Bowl	W 35–16	January 1, 2020	2019	Michigan Wolverines	Camping World Stadium	Orlando	59,746	Nick Saban
72	Rose Bowl§	W 31–14	January 1, 2021	2020	Notre Dame Fighting Irish	AT&T Stadium	Arlington	18,373	Nick Saban
73	CFP National Championship*	W 52–24	January 11, 2021	2020	Ohio State Buckeyes	Hard Rock Stadium	Miami Gardens	14,926	Nick Saban
74	Cotton Bowl Classic§	W 27–6	December 31, 2021	2021	Cincinnati Bearcats	AT&T Stadium	Arlington	76,313	Nick Saban
75	CFP National Championship*	L 18–33	January 10, 2022	2021	Georgia Bulldogs	Lucas Oil Stadium	Indianapolis	68,311	Nick Saban
76	Sugar Bowl	W 45–20	December 31, 2022	2022	Kansas State Wildcats	Caesars Superdome	New Orleans	60,437	Nick Saban
77	Rose Bowl§	L 20–27	January 1, 2024	2023	Michigan Wolverines	Rose Bowl	Pasadena	96,371	Nick Saban
78	ReliaQuest Bowl	L 13–19	December 31, 2024	2024	Michigan Wolverines	Raymond James Stadium	Tampa	51,439	Kalen DeBoer
79	CFP First Round§	W 34–24	December 19, 2025	2025	Oklahoma Sooners	Gaylord Family Oklahoma Memorial Stadium	Norman	83,550	Kalen DeBoer
80	Rose Bowl§	L 3–38	January 1, 2026	2025	Indiana Hoosiers	Rose Bowl	California	90,278	Kalen DeBoer
