= 2006 Alabama Crimson Tide football team =

American college football season

2006 Alabama Crimson Tide football

Independence Bowl, L 31–34 vs. Oklahoma State
- Conference: Southeastern Conference
- Western Division
- Record: 0–7, 6 wins vacated (0–6 SEC, 2 wins vacated)
- Head coach: Mike Shula (4th season; regular season); Joe Kines (bowl game)
- Offensive coordinator: David Rader (4th season)
- Offensive scheme: Pro-style
- Defensive coordinator: Joe Kines (6th season)
- Base defense: 3–3–5
- Captains: Le'Ron McClain; Juwan Simpson
- Home stadium: Bryant–Denny Stadium

2006 Southeastern Conference football standings
	Conf.			Overall
Team	W		L	W		L
Eastern Division
No. 1 Florida x$#	7	–	1	13	–	1
No. 25 Tennessee	5	–	3	9	–	4
No. 23 Georgia	4	–	4	9	–	4
Kentucky	4	–	4	8	–	5
South Carolina	3	–	5	8	–	5
Vanderbilt	1	–	7	4	–	8
Western Division
No. 15 Arkansas x	7	–	1	10	–	4
No. 9 Auburn	6	–	2	11	–	2
No. 3 LSU %	6	–	2	11	–	2
Alabama	2	–	6	6	–	7
Ole Miss	2	–	6	4	–	8
Mississippi State	1	–	7	3	–	9
Championship: Florida 38, Arkansas 28
# – BCS National Champion; $ – BCS representative as conference champion; % – BCS at-large representative; x – Division champion/co-champions; Alabama had all victories vacated by the NCAA in 2010. As such, the official record for Alabama is 0–7 (0–6).; Rankings from AP Poll

The 2006 Alabama Crimson Tide football team represented the University of Alabama as a member of the Southeastern Conference (SEC) during the 2006 NCAA Division I FBS football season. Led by Mike Shula in his fourth and final year as head coach during the regular season and Joe Kines as interim head coach for their bowl game, the Crimson Tide compiled an overall record of 6–7 with a mark of 2–6 in conference play, tying for fourth place SEC's Western Division. Alabama was invited to the Independence Bowl, where the Crimson Tide lost to Oklahoma State. The team played home games at Bryant–Denny Stadium in Tuscaloosa, Alabama.

Despite a strong 5–2 start, Alabama finished the regular season by losing four of the final five games. The Crimson Tide closed the regular season at 6–6 with a defeat for a fifth-straight year to rival Auburn. Following the loss, Shula was fired and defensive coordinator Joe Kines was appointed interim head coach for the bowl game.

In 2009, the National Collegiate Athletic Association (NCAA) levied sanctions against Alabama, forcing the Crimson Tide to vacate all of their wins from the season.

== Schedule ==
The Sagarin computer ratings calculated Alabama's strength of schedule to be the 55th most difficult out of the 241 Division I teams. The Cosgrove Computer Rankings calculated it as the 65th most difficult out of the 119 Division I FBS teams in its rankings. It featured four pre-season AP Top 25 teams, four of which made bowl games in 2005.

In accordance with conference rules, Alabama faced all five Western Division opponents: Arkansas, Auburn, LSU, Mississippi State, and Ole Miss. They also faced three Eastern Division opponents: official SEC rival Tennessee, Florida, and Vanderbilt. Alabama did not play SEC opponents Georgia, Kentucky and South Carolina. Alabama also played four non-conference games. The non-conference schedule included games against Hawaii of the Western Athletic Conference, Duke of the Atlantic Coast Conference and both Louisiana–Monroe and Florida International of the Sun Belt Conference. For the 2006 Independence Bowl, Alabama played Oklahoma State of the Big 12 Conference.

Date	Time	Opponent	Rank	Site	TV	Result	Attendance
September 2	5:00 p.m.	Hawaii*	No. 25	Bryant–Denny Stadium; Tuscaloosa, AL	PPV	W 25–17 (vacated)	92,138
September 9	2:30 p.m.	Vanderbilt	No. 24	Bryant–Denny Stadium; Tuscaloosa, AL	SECRN	W 13–10 (vacated)	92,138
September 16	6:00 p.m.	Louisiana–Monroe*	No. 23	Bryant–Denny Stadium; Tuscaloosa, AL	PPV	W 41–7 (vacated)	92,138
September 23	2:30 p.m.	at Arkansas	No. 22	Donald W. Reynolds Razorback Stadium; Fayetteville, AR	CBS	L 23–24 ^{2OT}	74,687
September 30	2:30 p.m.	at No. 5 Florida		Ben Hill Griffin Stadium; Gainesville, FL (rivalry)	CBS	L 13–28	90,671
October 7	6:00 p.m.	Duke*		Bryant–Denny Stadium; Tuscaloosa, AL	PPV	W 30–14 (vacated)	92,138
October 14	2:30 p.m.	Ole Miss		Bryant–Denny Stadium; Tuscaloosa, AL (rivalry)	CBS	W 26–23 ^{OT} (vacated)	92,138
October 21	2:30 p.m.	at No. 9 Tennessee		Neyland Stadium; Knoxville, TN (Third Saturday in October)	CBS	L 13–16	106,695
October 28	2:00 p.m.	FIU*^{†}		Bryant–Denny Stadium; Tuscaloosa, AL	PPV	W 38–3 (vacated)	92,138
November 4	11:30 a.m.	Mississippi State		Bryant–Denny Stadium; Tuscaloosa, AL (rivalry)	LFS	L 16–24	92,138
November 11	6:45 p.m.	at No. 12 LSU		Tiger Stadium; Baton Rouge, LA (rivalry)	ESPN	L 14–28	92,588
November 18	2:30 p.m.	No. 15 Auburn		Bryant–Denny Stadium; Tuscaloosa, AL (Iron Bowl)	CBS	L 15–22	92,138
December 28	2:30 p.m.	vs. Oklahoma State*		Independence Stadium; Shreveport, LA (Independence Bowl)	ESPN	L 31–34	45,054
*Non-conference game; ^{†}Homecoming; Rankings from Coaches Poll released prior to the game; All times are in Central time

== Before the season ==
Alabama finished their 2005 campaign at with a 13–10 win over Texas Tech in the 2006 Cotton Bowl Classic for a final record of 10–2. Several years later, in June 2009, the NCAA Committee on Infractions sanctioned Alabama for "major violations" of NCAA policies as a result of athletes who received improper benefits in 16 of 19 NCAA sports, including football. As part of the penalties imposed, the football program was forced to vacate all ten victories from the 2005 season making the official 2005 record 0–2.

The 2006 season also marked the first played in Bryant–Denny Stadium after the completion of the north endzone expansion. The $47 million expansion increased its overall capacity to 92,138 (then the 5th largest on-campus stadium), added several new luxury boxes and saw the completion of the Walk of Champions off University Boulevard. The Walk of Champions, at the time, featured statues of the four national championship Alabama head coaches: Wallace Wade, Frank Thomas, Bear Bryant and Gene Stallings. At that time a fifth space was left vacant for a future statue, and on April 16, 2011, the University unveiled a statue of Nick Saban for winning the 2009 national championship at that location.

=== Returning starters ===
Alabama had 13 returning starters from the previous season, including eight on offense, four on defense and one on special teams. The most notable departures from the previous year were Brodie Croyle and J. B. Closner on offense; Mark Anderson, Rudy Griffin, Freddie Roach, DeMeco Ryans, Anthony Madison, Roman Harper and Charlie Peprah on defense; and Jeremy Schatz, Matt Miller and Drew Lane on special teams.

==== Offense ====
Player	Class	Position
Keith Brown	Junior	Wide receiver
D. J. Hall	Junior	Wide receiver
Chris Capps	Junior	Offensive tackle
B.J. Stabler	Sophomore	Offensive guard
Kyle Tatum	Senior	Offensive tackle
Nick Walker	Sophomore	Tight end
Le'Ron McClain	Senior	Fullback
Kenneth Darby	Senior	Running back

==== Defense ====
Player	Class	Position
Jeremy Clark	Senior	Defensive tackle
Wallace Gilberry	Junior	Defensive end
Juwan Simpson	Senior	Linebacker
Ramzee Robinson	Senior	Cornerback

==== Special teams ====
Player	Class	Position
Jamie Christensen	Junior	Placekicker

== Game summaries ==
=== Hawaii ===
Team	1	2	3	4	Total
Hawaiʻi	3	0	7	7	17
• Alabama	3	12	7	3	25

- Location: Tuscaloosa, Alabama
- Game start: 6:09 p.m.
- Elapsed time: 3:03
- Game attendance: 92,138
- Game weather: 87 °F (31 °C), partly cloudy, winds N at 12 mph (19 km/h)
- Referee: Jeff Roberson
- TV announcers (CTSN PPV): David Crane (play-by-play), Tyler Watts (analyst), Chris Stewart (sideline)

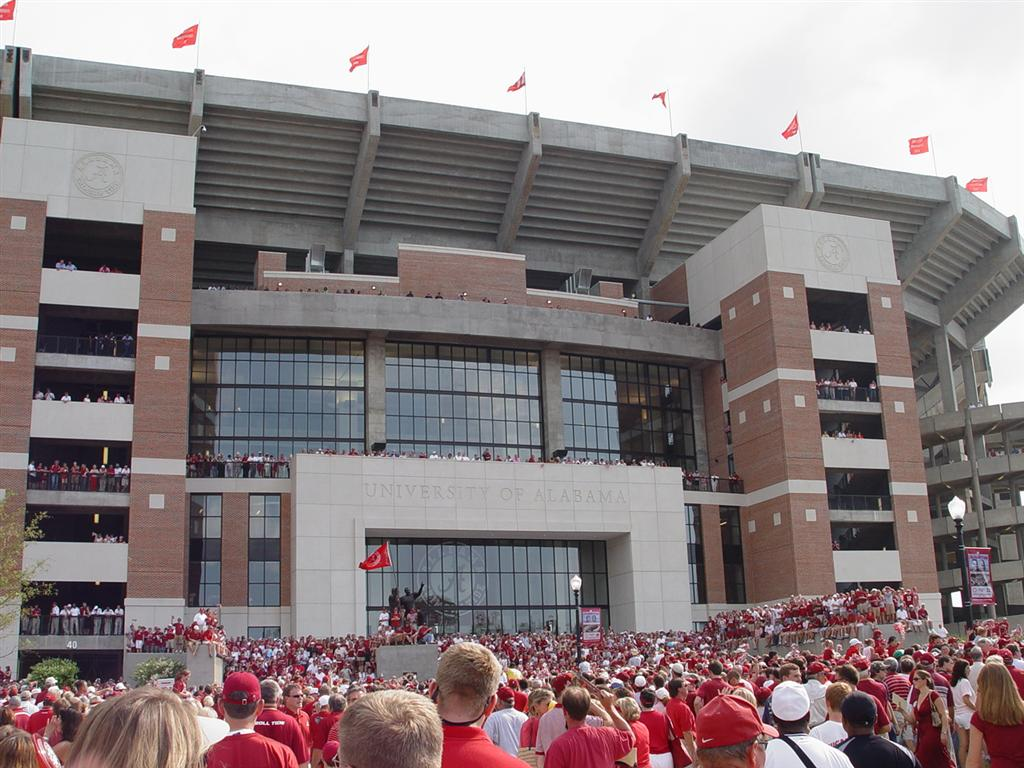
The north end of Bryant-Denny Stadium was officially opened for the Hawaiʻi game

Alabama opened the 2006 season by defeating the Hawaiʻi Warriors 25–17 in their first all-time visit to Bryant–Denny Stadium. Hawaii got on the board first when Dan Kelly connected on a 42-yard field goal to give the Warriors a 3–0 lead. Alabama tied it up at 3–3 on a 31-yard Leigh Tiffin field goal later in the first quarter. The Crimson Tide then took a 10–3 lead of the evening when Tim Castille scored on a three-yard touchdown run early in the second quarter. Alabama then extended their lead to 15–3 at halftime after the Hawaii punter Kurt Milne knocked the ball out of the endzone because of a bad snap for a safety and Tiffin connected on a 23-yard field goal.

The Crimson Tide scored on their opening drive of the third quarter when John Parker Wilson threw a 35-yard touchdown pass to Keith Brown. Hawaii then cut the Alabama lead to 22–10 later that quarter when Colt Brennan threw a 16-yard touchdown strike to Reagan Maui'a. In the fourth quarter, a 27-yard Tiffin field goal extended the Alabama lead to 25–10. The Warriors responded Brennen connected with Ryan Grice-Mullen for a 31-yard touchdown reception to make the score 25–17. After holding the Tide on their next offensive series, Hawaii managed to drive 49 yards in 2:40 to get in position to potentially tie the game and send it into overtime. Alabama secured the 25–17 victory on the final play of the game when Lionel Mitchell intercepted a Brennen pass in the endzone for a touchback as time expired. The victory improved Alabama's all-time record against the Warriors to 1–1 (2–1 without NCAA vacations).

=== Vanderbilt ===
Team	1	2	3	4	Total
Vanderbilt	0	10	0	0	10
• Alabama	3	0	7	3	13

- Location: Tuscaloosa, Alabama
- Game start: 5:26 p.m.
- Elapsed time: 2:49
- Game attendance: 92,138
- Game weather: 87 °F (31 °C), partly cloudy, winds ESE at 7 mph (11 km/h)
- Referee: Hubert Owens
- TV announcers (FSN South): Bill Rosinski (play-by-play), David Archer (analyst), Jenn Hildreth (reporter)

A week after defeating Hawaii, the Crimson Tide opened conference play against the Vanderbilt Commodores and defeated them 13–10. Alabama scored first on a 37-yard Leigh Tiffin field goal with just under a minute remaining in the first quarter. Vanderbilt responded with ten second quarter points to take a 10–3 halftime lead after Bryant Hahnfeldt first connected on a 42-yard field goal and Chris Nickson threw a six-yard touchdown pass to Earl Bennett.

The Crimson Tide tied the game on their first drive of the third quarter when John Parker Wilson hit D. J. Hall for a 31-yard touchdown reception. Tiffin then scored the game-winning field goal from 47 yards out to give Alabama the 13–10 victory. The victory improved Alabama's all-time record against the Commodores to 57–19–4 (60–18–4 without NCAA vacations and forfeits).

=== Louisiana–Monroe ===
Team	1	2	3	4	Total
Louisiana–Monroe	7	0	0	0	7
• Alabama	7	10	10	14	41

- Location: Tuscaloosa, Alabama
- Game start: 6:07 p.m.
- Elapsed time: 2:56
- Game attendance: 92,138
- Game weather: 84 °F (29 °C), partly cloudy, winds S at 3 mph (4.8 km/h)
- Referee: Marc Curles
- TV announcers (CTSN PPV): David Crane (play-by-play), Tyler Watts (analyst), Chris Stewart (sideline)

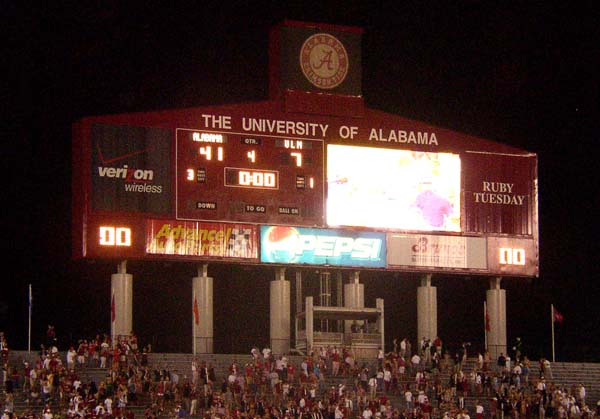
Final scoreboard at the conclusion of the game.

The Crimson Tide extended their overall record to 3–0 after they defeated the Louisiana–Monroe Warhawks 41–7 in the first all-time meeting between the programs. Alabama opened the scoring midway through the first quarter when Le'Ron McClain caught a 17-yard touchdown pass from John Parker Wilson. The Crimson Tide extended their lead to 10–0 after Leigh Tiffin connected on a 34-yard field goal early in the second quarter. The Warhawks then responded with their only points of the game after Kinsmon Lancaster cut the Alabama lead to 10–7 with his two-yard touchdown run. Tim Castille then scored on a three-yard run to give the Tide a 17–7 halftime lead.

In the third, Tiffin connected on a 25-yard field goal and John Parker Wilson threw a 43-yard touchdown strike to D. J. Hall to extend the Alabama lead to 27–7 entering the fourth quarter. In the fourth, Roy Upchurch scored two touchdowns on separate one-yard runs to make the final score 41–7.

=== Arkansas ===
Team	1	2	3	4	OT	2OT	Total
Alabama	0	10	0	7	0	6	23
• Arkansas	3	0	14	0	0	7	24

- Location: Fayetteville, Arkansas
- Game start: 2:35 p.m.
- Elapsed time: 3:20
- Game attendance: 74,687
- Game weather: 74 °F (23 °C), partly cloudy, winds W at 9 mph (14 km/h)
- Referee: Matt Austin
- TV announcers (CBS): Verne Lundquist (play-by-play), Gary Danielson (analyst), Tracy Wolfson (sideline)

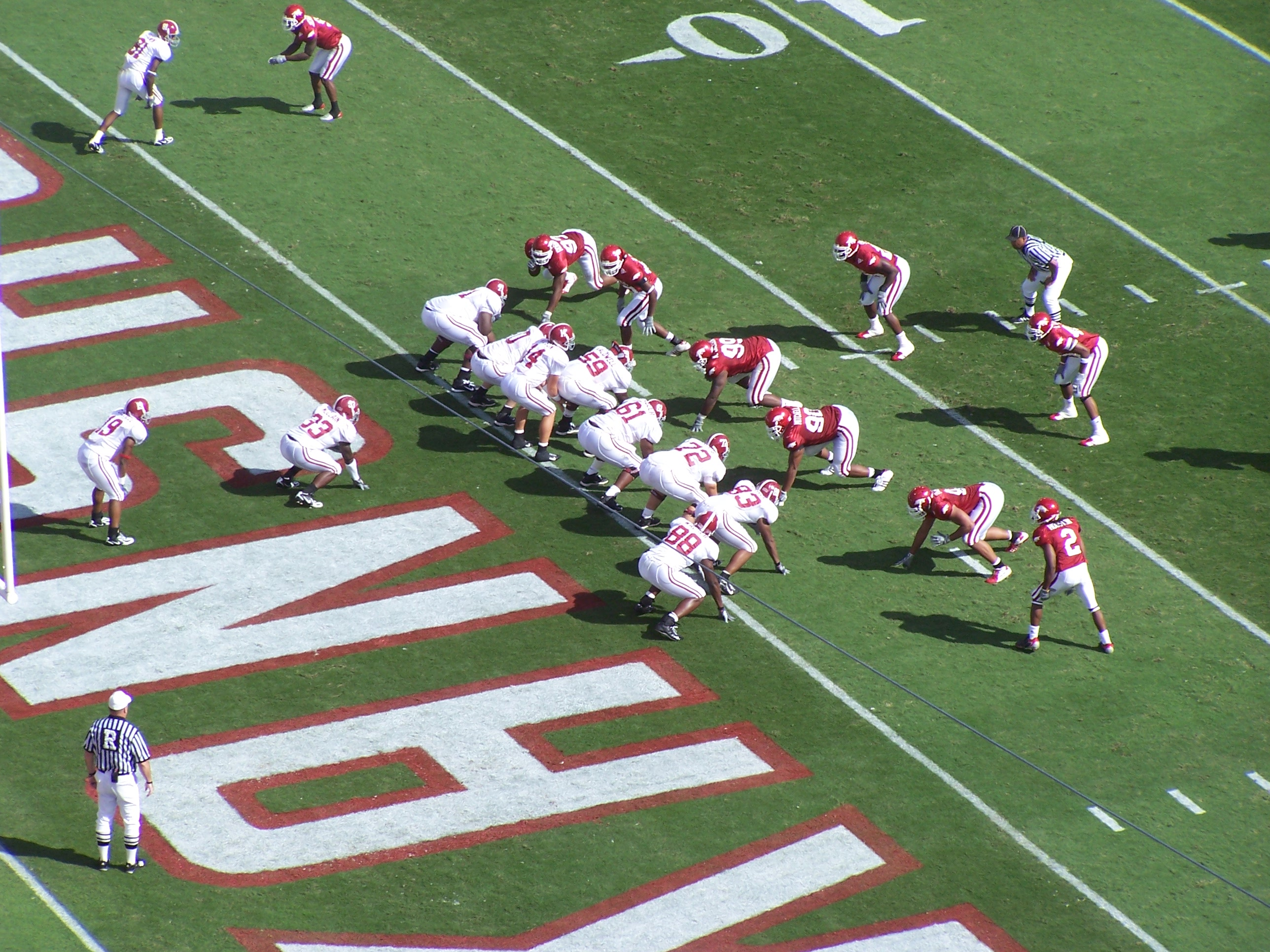
The Alabama offense (white) backed up on their goalline.

After opening the season with three consecutive home games, the Crimson Tide traveled to Fayetteville and lost to the Arkansas Razorbacks 24–23 in double overtime. Arkansas took an early 3–0 lead in the first quarter after Jeremy Davis connected with a 24-yard field goal. Alabama took a 7–3 lead in the second quarter when John Parker Wilson threw a 78-yard touchdown pass to D. J. Hall to cap a four-play, 99-yard drive. Leigh Tiffin would also convert a 46-yard field goal as time expired in the second quarter to give the Crimson Tide a 10–3 halftime lead.

The Razorbacks then took a 17–10 lead with a pair of third-quarter touchdowns. The first came on a three-yard Darren McFadden run, with Davis missing the extra point. The second came on a defensive touchdown when Randy Kelly recovered a Wilson fumble and returned it 39-yards for a touchdown. Mitch Mustain then successfully threw a two-point conversion pass to McFadden and Arkansas was up 17–10. Alabama tied the game early in the fourth quarter when Keith Brown caught a 14-yard Wilson touchdown pass, which as it turned out sent the game into overtime.

In the overtime period, Arkansas was on offense first, and on their initial series, a Mustain pass was intercepted by Lionel Mitchell. On Alabama's first offensive series, Tiffin missed a 37-yard field goal to send the game into a second overtime period. In the second overtime, Alabama was on offense first and scored on a one-yard Nick Walker touchdown run. However, Tiffin missed the extra point and the Crimson Tide was up by only six points. Arkansas responded with an 11-yard Mustain touchdown pass to Ben Cleveland and the Davis extra point gave the Razorbacks the 24–23 victory. The loss brought Alabama's all-time record against the Razorbacks to 7–8 (10–7 without NCAA vacations and forfeits).

=== Florida ===
Alabama–Florida football rivalry

Team	1	2	3	4	Total
Alabama	7	3	0	3	13
• #5 Florida	0	7	7	14	28

- Location: Gainesville, Florida
- Game start: 3:35 p.m.
- Elapsed time: 3:33
- Game attendance: 90,671
- Game weather: 84 °F (29 °C), mostly sunny, winds NE at 6 mph (9.7 km/h)
- Referee: Penn Wagers
- TV announcers (CBS): Verne Lundquist (play-by-play), Gary Danielson (analyst), Tracy Wolfson (sideline)

A week after a disappointing, double overtime loss to Arkansas, the Crimson Tide lost their second game in a row on the road to the Florida Gators 28–13 at Ben Hill Griffin Stadium. Alabama struck first with a defensive touchdown late in the first quarter when Prince Hall returned a Chris Leak fumble 50 yards for a 7–0 Crimson Tide lead. Alabama then extended their lead to 10–0 early in the second quarter on a 21-yard Jamie Christensen field goal before Florida took over. The Gators closed the score to 10–7 late in the quarter when Tim Tebow scored from two-yards out.

Florida then took their first lead of the game late in the third quarter when Leak connected with Andre Caldwell for a 16-yard touchdown reception. After a second Christensen field goal closed the gap to 14–13, the Gators closed with a pair of fourth-quarter touchdowns to secure the victory. With just under 7:00 remaining in the game, Leak threw his second touchdown pass of the day on a 21-yard Dallas Baker reception. On the ensuing Alabama drive, Reggie Nelson intercepted a John Parker Wilson pass and returned it 70-yards for a defensive touchdown and a 28–13 Florida victory. The loss brought Alabama's all-time record against the Gators to 20–13 (21–13 without the NCAA vacation of the 2005 victory).

=== Duke ===
Team	1	2	3	4	Total
Duke	0	14	0	0	14
• Alabama	3	7	6	14	30

- Location: Tuscaloosa, Alabama
- Game start: 6:07 p.m.
- Elapsed time: 3:13
- Game attendance: 92,138
- Game weather: 74 °F (23 °C), clear, winds NNE at 6 mph (9.7 km/h)
- Referee: Scott McElwee
- TV announcers (CTSN PPV): David Crane (play-by-play), Tyler Watts (analyst), Chris Stewart (sideline)

After a pair of consecutive conference losses on the road, Alabama returned to Tuscaloosa and defeated the Duke Blue Devils 30–14. The Crimson Tide took a 3–0 lead after Jamie Christensen connected on a 37-yard field goal on Alabama's first drive of the game. Early in the second quarter Duke took a 7–3 lead after Thaddeus Lewis threw a nine-yard touchdown pass to Eron Riley. The teams then traded touchdowns with Alabama scoring on a four-yard D. J. Hall touchdown reception from John Parker Wilson, and with Duke scoring on a five-yard Lewis run to give the Blue Devils a 14–10 halftime lead.

In the second half, Alabama shutout Duke and scored three touchdowns en route to their 30–14 victory. Keith Brown scored on a nine-yard touchdown pass from Wilson. However, Casey Camero blocked the Christensen extra point attempt and the Crimson Tide led 16–14 entering the fourth quarter. In the fourth, Alabama scored on a two-yard Jimmy Johns touchdown run and when Lionel Mitchell intercepted a Lewis pass and returned it 50-yards for a touchdown to make the final score 30–14. The victory improved Alabama's all-time record against the Blue Devils to 1–1 (2–1 without NCAA vacations).

=== Ole Miss ===
Alabama–Ole Miss football rivalry

Team	1	2	3	4	OT	Total
Ole Miss	7	6	0	7	3	23
• Alabama	7	3	3	7	6	26

- Location: Tuscaloosa, Alabama
- Game start: 2:35 p.m.
- Elapsed time: 3:15
- Game attendance: 92,138
- Game weather: 74 °F (23 °C), sunny, winds WNW at 7 mph (11 km/h)
- Referee: Penn Wagers
- TV announcers (CBS): Verne Lundquist (play-by-play), Gary Danielson (analyst), Tracy Wolfson (sideline)

A week after their victory over Duke, the Crimson Tide needed overtime to defeat their rival, the Ole Miss Rebels 26–23. Alabama opened the scoring on their first offensive possession when John Parker Wilson connected with D. J. Hall for a 39-yard touchdown reception and a 7–0 lead. The Rebels tied the game at 7–7 later in the quarter when BenJarvus Green-Ellis scored on a two-yard touchdown run. In the second quarter, all of the points came by way of field goals with Jamie Christensen hitting one for Alabama from 26-yards and Joshua Shene hitting two for Ole Miss from 36 and 23-yards to make the halftime score 13–10 Rebels.

After a 26-yard Christensen field goal tied the game at 13–13 in the third quarter, Alabama took a 20–13 lead early in the fourth quarter on a two-yard Tim Castille touchdown run. Ole Miss tied the game up at 20–20 when Brent Schaeffer threw a 55-yard touchdown pass to Mike Wallace that ultimately sent the game into overtime. In the overtime period, Ole Miss scored first with a 37-yard Shene field goal, but Alabama won the game when Wilson connected with Le'Ron McClain for a two-yard, game-winning touchdown reception. The victory improved Alabama's all-time record against the Rebels to 39–9–2 (42–8–2 without NCAA vacations and forfeits).

=== Tennessee ===
Third Saturday in October

Team	1	2	3	4	Total
Alabama	3	3	7	0	13
• #7 Tennessee	0	3	3	10	16

- Location: Knoxville, Tennessee
- Game start: 3:34 p.m.
- Elapsed time: 3:30
- Game attendance: 106,695
- Game weather: 63 °F (17 °C), sunny, winds calm
- Referee: Thomas Ritter
- TV announcers (CBS): Verne Lundquist (play-by-play), Gary Danielson (analyst), Tracy Wolfson (sideline)

A week after their victory over Ole Miss, the Crimson Tide made the trip to Neyland Stadium and lost their rival, the Tennessee Volunteers 16–13. Alabama and the Volunteers traded field goals through the end of the third quarter when Tim Castille scored for the Crimson Tide on a two-yard run to give Alabama a 13–6 lead. Tennessee responded by shutting-out Alabama in the fourth quarter and scoring ten unanswered points to secure their 16–13 victory. The Volunteers scored first of a 27-yard James Wilhoit field goal and then took their first lead of the game with only 3:28 remaining when Arian Foster scored a touchdown from one-yard out. The loss brought Alabama's all-time record against Tennessee to 43–38–7 (45–37–7 without NCAA vacations and forfeits).

=== FIU ===
Team	1	2	3	4	Total
FIU	3	0	0	0	3
• Alabama	0	10	14	14	38

- Location: Tuscaloosa, Alabama
- Game start: 2:09 p.m.
- Elapsed time: 3:04
- Game attendance: 92,138
- Game weather: 63 °F (17 °C), sunny, winds NW at 10 mph (16 km/h)
- Referee: Matt Austin
- TV announcers (CTSN PPV): David Crane (play-by-play), Tyler Watts (analyst), Chris Stewart (sideline)

For the 2006 homecoming game, the Crimson Tide defeated the Florida International Golden Panthers 38–3. The game was notable for the 18 FIU players suspended for the contest due to their involvement in their brawl against Miami two weeks earlier. The Golden Panthers scored their only points of the game late in the first quarter when Dustin Rivest connected on a 37-yard field goal. Their 3–0 lead would be their only of the game as the Crimson Tide proceeded to score 38 unanswered points. In the second quarter, Le'Ron McClain scored on a nine-yard John Parker Wilson touchdown pass and Jamie Christensen connected on a 46-yard field goal to give Alabama a 10–3 halftime lead.

In the third quarter, the Crimson Tide scored on a 65-yard Javier Arenas punt return for a touchdown and on a one-yard Tim Castille touchdown run to give Alabama a 24–3 lead entering the fourth quarter. In the fourth, Alabama scored a defensive touchdown when Ramzee Robinson intercepted a Josh Padrick pass and returned it 34-yards for a touchdown. The final points of the game came late in the fourth when Jimmy Barnes threw a six-yard touchdown pass to Matt Caddell to make the final score 38–3.

=== Mississippi State ===
Alabama–Mississippi State football rivalry

Team	1	2	3	4	Total
• Mississippi State	7	17	0	0	24
Alabama	3	7	6	0	16

- Location: Tuscaloosa, Alabama
- Game start: 11:34 a.m.
- Elapsed time: 3:15
- Game attendance: 92,138
- Game weather: 58 °F (14 °C), sunny, winds ESE at 11 mph (18 km/h)
- Referee: Rocky Goode
- TV announcers (LFS): Bill Rosinski (play-by-play), Dave Rowe (analyst), Jenn Hildreth (reporter)

In the 2006 edition of their annual rivalry, the Mississippi State Bulldogs led by former Alabama center Sylvester Croom defeated the Crimson Tide for the first time in five years 24–16. Alabama scored first on a 19-yard Jamie Christensen field goal, and State responded on the ensuing drive when Michael Henig threw a 25-yard touchdown pass to Tony Burks to give the Bulldogs a 7–3 lead at the end of the first quarter. In the second quarter, Adam Carlson connected on a 39-yard field goal, and then Jeffrey Dukes intercepted a Henig pass and returned it 24-yards for a touchdown to tie the game at 10–10.

The Bulldogs responded with a pair of touchdowns to take a 24–10 lead at halftime. The first came on a 13-yard Henig touchdown pass to Jamayel Smith and the second when Quinton Culberson intercepted a John Parker Wilson pass and returned it 51 yards for a defensive touchdown. Alabama was only able to score on a pair of Jamie Christensen field goals in the third quarter and was shut out in the fourth which resulted in the Bulldogs winning the game 24–16.

=== LSU ===
Alabama–LSU football rivalry

Team	1	2	3	4	Total
Alabama	7	7	0	0	14
• #12 LSU	14	7	7	0	28

- Location: Baton Rouge, Louisiana
- Game start: 6:47 p.m.
- Elapsed time: 3:16
- Game attendance: 92,588
- Game weather: 54 °F (12 °C), winds NE at 10–15 mph (16–24 km/h)
- Referee: Hubert Owens
- TV announcers (ESPN): Mike Patrick (play-by-play), Todd Blackledge (color), Holly Rowe (sideline)

In the 2006 edition of their annual rivalry, the LSU Tigers defeated the Crimson Tide in "Death Valley" 28–14. The Tigers took a 14–0 lead in the first quarter after Keiland Williams scored on a 38-yard touchdown run and after JaMarcus Russell threw a 30-yard touchdown pass to Early Doucet. The Crimson Tide then cut the lead to 14–7 Kenneth Darby was on the receiving end of a 29-yard John Parker Wilson touchdown pass. In the second quarter, both teams traded touchdowns with LSU taking a 21–14 halftime lead. LSU scored first on a 19-yard Russell touchdown pass to Dwayne Bowe and Alabama on a six-yard Wilson pass to Nikita Stover. The final points of the game came on Russell's third touchdown pass of the evening on a 17-yard pass to Jacob Hester to make the final score 28–14.

=== Auburn ===
Iron Bowl

Team	1	2	3	4	Total
• #15 Auburn	0	14	8	0	22
Alabama	3	6	6	0	15

- Location: Tuscaloosa, Alabama
- Game start: 2:35 p.m.
- Elapsed time: 3:18
- Game attendance: 92,138
- Game weather: 66 °F (19 °C), fair, winds WNW at 8 mph (13 km/h)
- Referee: Penn Wagers
- TV announcers (CBS): Verne Lundquist (play-by-play), Gary Danielson (analyst), Tracy Wolfson (sideline)

In the 2006 edition of the annual Iron Bowl, the arch-rival Auburn Tigers defeated the Crimson Tide for the fifth consecutive time by a score of 22–15. Alabama scored first on a 24-yard Jamie Christensen field goal to take a 3–0 lead into the second quarter. Auburn took a 14–3 lead in the second quarter after touchdown runs of twelve and eight-yards by Brad Lester and Kenny Irons. The Crimson Tide responded with a 52-yard John Parker Wilson touchdown pass to Nikita Stover, and after a failed two-point conversion attempt the Tigers led 14–9 at halftime.

Alabama opened the third quarter on offense and drove 80 yards in eleven plays with Wilson throwing a 13-yard touchdown pass to Travis McCall. After a second failed two-point conversion attempt, the Tide took a 15–14 lead. Auburn responded later in the third with what was a game-winning touchdown drive. Brandon Cox connected with Prechae Rodriguez for a 22-yard touchdown reception, and after a successful two-point conversion pass from Carl Stewart to Lee Guess the Tigers took a 22–15 that was not relinquished in the Auburn victory. Following their loss, head coach Mike Shula was subsequently fired on November 27 after four years with the program. At that time athletic director Mal Moore announced defensive coordinator Joe Kines would serve as interim head coach for the Independence Bowl.

=== Oklahoma State ===
Independence Bowl

Team	1	2	3	4	Total
• Oklahoma State	7	17	0	10	34
Alabama	7	7	3	14	31

- Location: Shreveport, Louisiana
- Game start: 3:31 p.m.
- Elapsed time: 3:38
- Game attendance: 45,054
- Game weather: 65 °F (18 °C), partly cloudy, winds ESE at 9 mph (14 km/h)
- Referee: Tom Zimorski
- Television network: ESPN

With Joe Kines serving as interim head coach for the 2006 edition of the Independence Bowl, the Crimson Tide were defeated by the Oklahoma State Cowboys 34–31. The Cowboys scored first on a one-yard Dantrell Savage touchdown run to take a 7–0 lead. Alabama responded later in the first when Matt Caddell had an 18-yard touchdown reception from John Parker Wilson to tie the game at 7–7. Oklahoma State responded with 10 consecutive points on a four-yard Keith Toston touchdown run and a 28-yard field goal by Jason Ricks to take a 17–7 lead. The Crimson Tide then responded with a one-yard Tim Castille touchdown run, only to have the Cowboys respond with a seven-yard Toston touchdown run to give Oklahoma State a 24–14 lead at the half.

After a 24-yard field goal by Jamie Christensen to bring the score to 24–17, the Cowboys responded with a ten-yard Adarius Bowman touchdown reception from Bobby Reid early in the fourth to extend their lead to 31–17. The Tide then scored 14 straight points on an 86-yard punt return by Javier Arenas and an Andre Smith 2-yard touchdown run to even the score at 31–31. The Cowboys sealed the victory with only 00:08 remaining in the game on a 27-yard, game-winning field goal by Jason Ricks.

== Personnel ==
=== Coaching staff ===
Following the completion of the 2005 season, Alabama had to replace an assistant coach for the first time during Mike Shula's tenure as head coach when Paul Randolph resigned as defensive line coach to accept a position as defensive coordinator and linebackers coach at Rice. On February 3, 2006, David Turner was hired from Vanderbilt to serve as defensive ends coach.

Name	Position	Seasons at Alabama	Alma mater
Mike Shula	Head coach	4	Alabama (1987)
Chris Ball	Secondary	4	Missouri Western State (1986)
Bob Connelly	Offensive line	4	Texas A&M–Commerce (1994)
Charlie Harbison	Wide receivers	4	Gardner–Webb (1995)
Joe Kines	Defensive coordinator /Interim Head Coach	4	Jacksonville State (1967)
David Rader	Offensive coordinator	4	Tulsa (1980)
David Turner	Defensive ends	1	Davidson (1985)
Dave Ungerer	Special teams, Tight ends	4	Southern Connecticut State (1980)
Sparky Woods	Running backs	4	Carson–Newman (1976)
Buddy Wyatt	Defensive line	4	TCU (1989)
Gabe Giardina	Graduate assistant	3	Alabama (2004)

=== Recruiting class ===
Alabama's recruiting class was highlighted by two players from the "ESPN 150": No. 4 Andre Smith (OT) and No. 124 Justin Woodall (S). Alabama signed the No. 11 recruiting class according to Rivals and the No. 18 according to Scout.

College recruiting information
Name	Hometown	School	Height	Weight	40^{‡}	Commit date
Earl Alexander; WR	Phenix City, AL	Central High School	6 ft 4 in (1.93 m)	203 lb (92 kg)	4.55	Dec 15, 2005
Earl Alexander; WR	Recruit ratings: Scout: Rivals: (73)					
Javier Arenas; CB	Tampa, FL	Thomas Richard Robinson High School	5 ft 10 in (1.78 m)	180 lb (82 kg)	4.50	Jan 23, 2006
Javier Arenas; CB	Recruit ratings: Scout: Rivals: (77)					
Tremayne Coge; CB	Columbia, TN	Columbia Central High School	5 ft 10.5 in (1.79 m)	176 lb (80 kg)	4.47	May 22, 2005
Tremayne Coge; CB	Recruit ratings: Scout: Rivals: (75)					
Andy Davis; S	Birmingham, AL	Briarwood Christian School	6 ft 0 in (1.83 m)	200 lb (91 kg)	4.45	Apr 13, 2005
Andy Davis; S	Recruit ratings: Scout: Rivals: (74)					
Preston Dial; TE	Mobile, AL	UMS-Wright Preparatory School	6 ft 4 in (1.93 m)	242 lb (110 kg)	4.75	Jul 14, 2005
Preston Dial; TE	Recruit ratings: Scout: Rivals: (64)					
Mike Ford; RB	Chatham, VA	Hargrave Military Academy	6 ft 1 in (1.85 m)	215 lb (98 kg)	4.50	Aug 12, 2005
Mike Ford; RB	Recruit ratings: Scout: Rivals: (40)					
Terry Grant; RB	Lumberton, MS	Lumberton High School	5 ft 9.5 in (1.77 m)	180 lb (82 kg)	4.45	Jan 31, 2006
Terry Grant; RB	Recruit ratings: Scout: Rivals: (76)					
Charlie Higgenbotham; LB	Mountain Brook, AL	Mountain Brook High School	6 ft 0 in (1.83 m)	210 lb (95 kg)	4.65	May 11, 2005
Charlie Higgenbotham; LB	Recruit ratings: Scout: Rivals: (77)					
LaBronski Hutchins; LB	Alexander City, AL	Benjamin Russell High School	6 ft 3 in (1.91 m)	195 lb (88 kg)	4.69	Oct 3, 2005
LaBronski Hutchins; LB	Recruit ratings: Scout: Rivals: (76)					
Marquis Johnson; CB	Sarasota, FL	Booker High School	6 ft 0 in (1.83 m)	180 lb (82 kg)	4.50	Sep 4, 2005
Marquis Johnson; CB	Recruit ratings: Scout: Rivals: (76)					
Jake Jones; S	Mountain Brook, AL	Mountain Brook High School	6 ft 1 in (1.85 m)	180 lb (82 kg)	4.55	Jan 4, 2006
Jake Jones; S	Recruit ratings: Scout: Rivals: (76)					
Charlie Kirschman; LB	Ponte Vedra Beach, FL	Allen D. Nease Senior High School	6 ft 3 in (1.91 m)	225 lb (102 kg)	4.75	Aug 1, 2005
Charlie Kirschman; LB	Recruit ratings: Scout: Rivals: (75)					
Mike McCoy; WR	Brandon, MS	Northwest Rankin High School	6 ft 2 in (1.88 m)	195 lb (88 kg)	4.60	Dec 11, 2005
Mike McCoy; WR	Recruit ratings: Scout: Rivals: (78)					
Greg McElroy; QB	Southlake, TX	Carroll Senior High School	6 ft 2 in (1.88 m)	210 lb (95 kg)	4.82	Jan 16, 2006
Greg McElroy; QB	Recruit ratings: Scout: Rivals: (77)					
Brian Motley; OL	Autaugaville, AL	Autaugaville High School	6 ft 2 in (1.88 m)	274 lb (124 kg)	5.30	Jun 15, 2005
Brian Motley; OL	Recruit ratings: Scout: Rivals: (70)					
Taylor Pharr; OL	Irondale, AL	Shades Valley High School	6 ft 6.5 in (1.99 m)	280 lb (130 kg)	–	Jun 16, 2005
Taylor Pharr; OL	Recruit ratings: Scout: Rivals: (NR)					
David Ross; OL	Irondale, AL	Shades Valley High School	6 ft 4 in (1.93 m)	285 lb (129 kg)	5.29	Oct 4, 2005
David Ross; OL	Recruit ratings: Scout: Rivals: (76)					
Andre Smith; OL	Birmingham, AL	Huffman High School	6 ft 4 in (1.93 m)	315 lb (143 kg)	5.20	Feb 1, 2006
Andre Smith; OL	Recruit ratings: Scout: Rivals: (93)					
Alex Stadler; OL	Bealeton, VA	Liberty High School	6 ft 6 in (1.98 m)	300 lb (140 kg)	–	Oct 10, 2005
Alex Stadler; OL	Recruit ratings: Scout: Rivals: (74)					
Nikita Stover; WR	Fulton, MS	Itawamba Community College	6 ft 2.5 in (1.89 m)	202 lb (92 kg)	4.53	Aug 15, 2005
Nikita Stover; WR	Recruit ratings: Scout: Rivals: (NR)					
Milton Talbert; DE	Hattiesburg, MS	Hattiesburg High School	6 ft 3 in (1.91 m)	234 lb (106 kg)	4.72	Feb 1, 2006
Milton Talbert; DE	Recruit ratings: Scout: Rivals: (40)					
Marcus Udell; CB	Tallahassee, FL	Amos P. Godby High School	5 ft 11 in (1.80 m)	180 lb (82 kg)	4.50	Jan 27, 2006
Marcus Udell; CB	Recruit ratings: Scout: Rivals: (76)					
Justin Woodall; S	Oxford, MS	Lafayette High School	6 ft 1 in (1.85 m)	200 lb (91 kg)	4.75	Dec 11, 2005
Justin Woodall; S	Recruit ratings: Scout: Rivals: (81)					
Overall recruit ranking: Scout: 18 Rivals: 11 ESPN: 18
‡ Refers to 40-yard dash; Note: In many cases, Scout, Rivals, 247Sports, On3, and ESPN may conflict in their listings of height, weight and 40 time.; In these cases, the average was taken. ESPN grades are on a 100-point scale.; Sources: "Alabama Signee List 2006". Rivals.; "Scout.com Football Recruiting: Alabama". Scout.; "2006 Player Signees- Alabama". ESPN.; "Scout.com Team Recruiting Rankings". Scout.; "2006 Team Ranking". Rivals.com.

== Awards and honors ==
Following the SEC Championship Game, the conference named its award winners. Simeon Castille was named to the Coaches' All-SEC First Team. D. J. Hall and Antoine Caldwell were named to the Coaches' All-SEC Second Team. Andre Smith, Prince Hall and punter P. J. Fitzgerald were named to the 2006 Freshman All-SEC Team. Prince Hall was also named the SEC Defensive Freshman of the Year by The Sporting News.

== After the season ==
Following the Independence Bowl loss, on January 3, 2007, Alabama announced that Nick Saban was hired from the Miami Dolphins to serve as the programs 27th head coach. In the weeks that followed, Saban worked to fill his staff for the 2007 season. As part of the A-Day celebrations on April 21, 2007, the 2006 team captains Le'Ron McClain and Juwan Simpson were honored at the Walk of Fame ceremony at the base of Denny Chimes.

=== NCAA sanctions ===
In October 2007, the athletic department discovered a potential NCAA-violations present throughout the athletics program. The violations stemmed from athletes from several sports, including football, receiving improper benefits as a result of a failure in the distribution system of textbooks to student athletes from the university. After a prolonged investigation, in June 2009 the NCAA ruled all athletes that received improper benefits related to the textbook distribution system were deemed ineligible. As such, as part of the penalties imposed on the football program, all victories which those included in the inquiry participated, were officially vacated from the all-time record. The penalty to vacate victories does not result in a loss (or forfeiture) of the affected contests or award a victory to the opponent. As such, all six victories from the 2006 season (Hawaii, Vanderbilt, Louisiana–Monroe, Duke, Ole Miss and Florida International) were vacated making the official record for the season zero wins and seven losses (0–7).
