= List of Alabama Crimson Tide head football coaches =

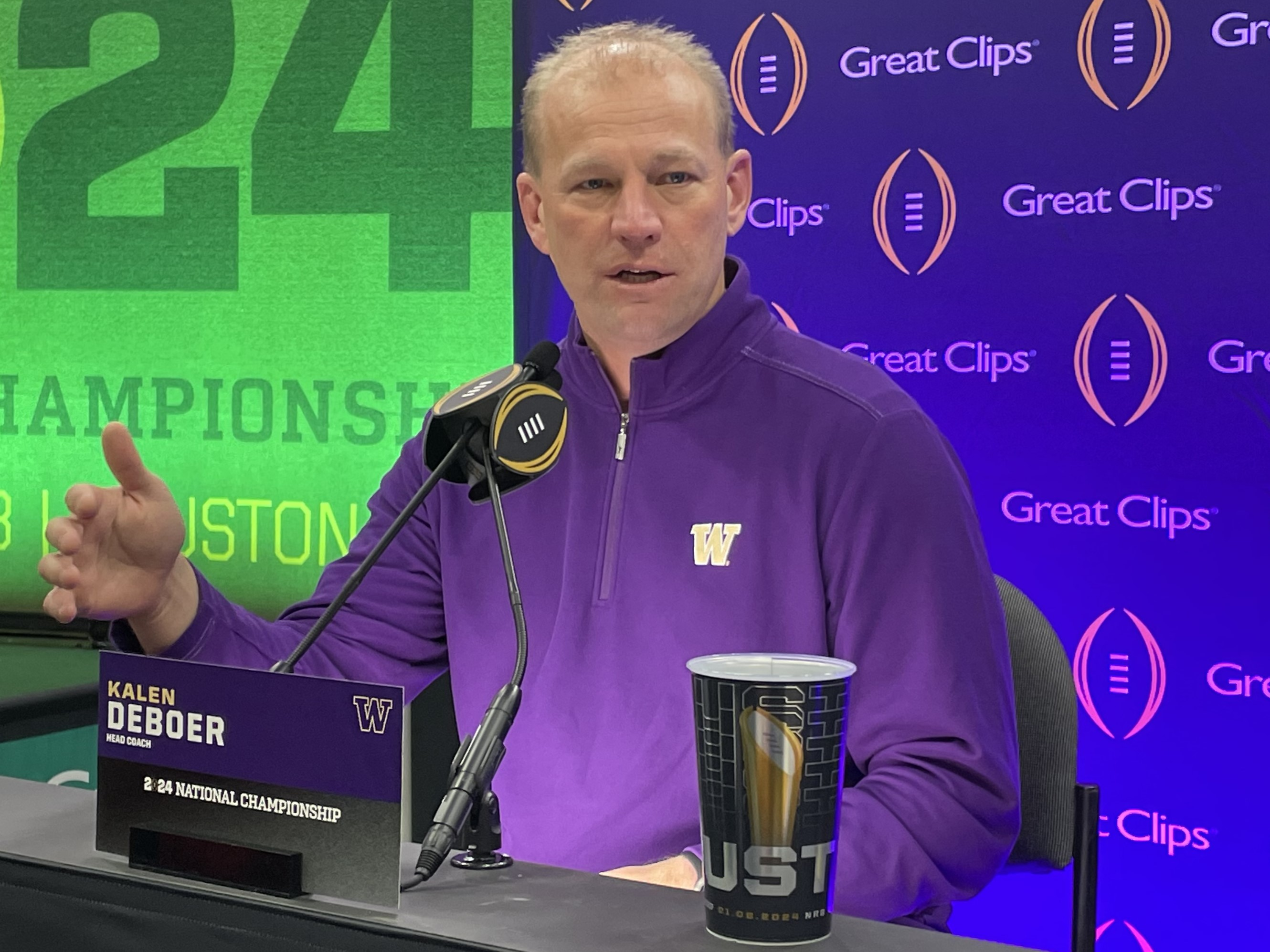
Kalen DeBoer is the 28th and current head coach of the Alabama Crimson Tide.

The Alabama Crimson Tide college football team represents the University of Alabama in the Southeastern Conference (SEC). The Crimson Tide competes as part of the NCAA Division I Football Bowl Subdivision. The program has had 28 head coaches, and 1 interim head coach, since it began play during the 1892 season. Since January 2024, Kalen DeBoer has served as Alabama's head coach.

Adopting the nickname of the Crimson Tide after the 1907 season, the team has played more than 1,350 games over 131 seasons. In that time, 13 coaches have led the Crimson Tide in postseason bowl games: Wallace Wade, Frank Thomas, Harold Drew, Bear Bryant, Ray Perkins, Bill Curry, Gene Stallings, Mike DuBose, Dennis Franchione, Mike Shula, Joe Kines, Nick Saban, and DeBoer. Eight of those coaches also won conference championships: Wade captured four as a member of the Southern Conference and Thomas, Drew, Bryant, Curry, Stallings, DuBose, and Saban won a combined 25 as a member of the SEC. During their tenures, Wade, Thomas, Bryant, Stallings, and Saban each won national championships with the Crimson Tide.

Bryant is the leader in seasons coached and games won, with 232 victories during his 25 years with the program. Saban has the highest winning percentage of those who have coached more than one game, with .866. Jennings B. Whitworth has the lowest winning percentage of those who have coached more than one game, with .166. Mike Price, who was hired in 2003, was fired prior to coaching a game. Of the 28 different head coaches who have led the Crimson Tide, Wade, Thomas, Bryant, Stallings, and Saban have been inducted into the College Football Hall of Fame.

== Key ==
Key to symbols in coaches list
General		Overall		Conference		Postseason (Note: Although the first Rose Bowl Game was played in 1902, it has been continuously played since the 1916 game, and is recognized as the oldest bowl game by the NCAA. "—" indicates any season prior to 1916 when postseason games were not played.)	
No.	Order of coaches (Note: A running total of the number of head coaches, with coaches who served separate tenures being counted only once. Interim head coaches are represented with "Int" and are not counted in the running total. "—" indicates the team played but either without a coach or no coach is on record. "X" indicates an interim year without play.)	GC	Games coached	CW	Conference wins	PW	Postseason wins
DC	Division championships	OW	Overall wins	CL	Conference losses	PL	Postseason losses
CC	Conference championships	OL	Overall losses	CT	Conference ties	PT	Postseason ties
NC	National championships	OT	Overall ties (Note: Overtime rules in college football were introduced in 1996, making ties impossible in the period since.)	C%	Conference winning percentage		
†	Elected to the College Football Hall of Fame	O%	Overall winning percentage (Note: When computing the win–loss percentage, a tie counts as half a win and half a loss.)				

== Coaches ==
List of head football coaches showing season(s) coached, overall records, conference records, postseason records, championships and selected awards (Note: Statistics correct as of the end of the 2025 NCAA Division I FBS football season.)
No.	Name	Year(s) (Note: Alabama did not field teams in 1898 due to school rules, in 1918 due to World War I and in 1943 due to World War II. The coach of the 1918 squad was to have been B. L. Noojin and the coach of the 1943 squad was to have been Frank Thomas.)	Season(s)	GC	OW	OL	OT	O%	CW	CL	CT	C%	PW	PL	PT	DC (Note: Divisional champions have advanced to the SEC Championship Game since the institution of divisional play beginning in the 1992 season. Since that time, Alabama has competed as a member of the SEC West.)	CC	NC	Awards
1	E. B. Beaumont	1892	1	4	2	2	0	0.500	—	—	—	—	—	—	—	—	—	0	—
2	Eli Abbott	1893–1895, 1902	3, 1	20	7	13	0	0.350	2	8	0	0.200	—	—	—	—	0	0	—
3	Otto Wagonhurst	1896	1	3	2	1	0	0.667	1	1	0	0.500	—	—	—	—	0	0	—
4	Allen McCants	1897	1	1	1	0	0	1.000	—	—	—	—	—	—	—	—	0	0	—
5	W. A. Martin	1899	1	4	3	1	0	0.750	1	0	0	1.000	—	—	—	—	0	0	—
6	Malcolm Griffin	1900	1	5	2	3	0	0.400	1	3	0	0.250	—	—	—	—	0	0	—
7	M. S. Harvey	1901	1	5	2	1	2	0.600	2	1	2	0.600	—	—	—	—	0	0	—
8	W. B. Blount	1903–1904	1	17	10	7	0	0.588	8	7	0	0.533	—	—	—	—	0	0	—
9	Jack Leavenworth	1905	1	10	6	4	0	0.600	5	4	0	0.556	—	—	—	—	0	0	—
10	J. W. H. Pollard	1906–1909	4	30	21	4	5	0.783	13	4	5	0.705	—	—	—	—	0	0	—
11	Guy Lowman	1910	1	8	4	4	0	0.500	1	4	0	0.200	—	—	—	—	0	0	—
12	D. V. Graves	1911–1914	4	36	21	12	3	0.625	14	11	3	0.554	—	—	—	—	0	0	—
13	Thomas Kelley	1915–1917	3	25	17	7	1	0.700	12	6	1	0.658	0	0	0	—	0	0	—
14	Xen Scott	1919–1922	4	41	29	9	3	0.744	17	8	3	0.661	0	0	0	—	0	0	—
15	Wallace Wade^{†}	1923–1930	8	77	61	13	3	0.812	45	10	2	0.807	2	0	1	—	4	3 – 1925, 1926, 1930	—
16	Frank Thomas^{†}	1931–1946	16	146	115	24	7	0.812	71	19	6	0.771	4	2	0	—	4	2 – 1934, 1941	SEC Coach of the Year (1945) (Note: The SEC Coach of the Year is voted by league coaches.)
17	Harold Drew	1947–1954	8	89	54	28	7	0.646	33	21	7	0.598	1	2	0	—	1	0	SEC Coach of the Year (1952)
18	Jennings B. Whitworth	1955–1957	3	30	4	24	2	0.167	3	18	1	0.159	0	0	0	—	0	0	—
19	Bear Bryant^{†}	1958–1982	25	287	232	46	9	0.824	125	25	5	0.823	12	10	2	—	13	6 – 1961, 1964, 1965, 1973, 1978, 1979	AFCA Coach of the Year (1961, 1971, 1973); AP SEC Coach of the Year (1961, 1964, 1965, 1971, 1973, 1974, 1977, 1978, 1979, 1981); UPI SEC Coach of the Year (1959, 1961, 1964, 1965, 1971, 1973, 1978, 1979, 1981); SEC Coach of the Year (1961, 1964, 1971, 1973, 1974, 1978, 1979, 1981)
20	Ray Perkins	1983–1986	4	48	32	15	1	0.677	14	9	1	0.604	3	0	0	—	0	0	—
21	Bill Curry	1987–1989	3	36	26	10	0	0.722	14	6	0	0.700	1	2	0	—	1	0	Bobby Dodd Coach of the Year Award (1989); AP SEC Coach of the Year (1989); UPI SEC Coach of the Year (1987, 1989); SEC Coach of the Year (1989)
22	Gene Stallings^{†} (Note: Stallings' record at the conclusion of the 1993 season was nine wins, three losses and one tie (9–3–1, 5–3–1 SEC). In August 1995, the NCAA ruled that Alabama must forfeit eight victories and one tie that Antonio Langham participated in as he was declared ineligible for previously signing with a sports agent in violation of NCAA rules. Thus the official NCAA record for 1993 is 1–12.)	1990–1996	7	87	62	25	0	0.713	38	16	0	0.704	5	1	0	4	1	1 – 1992	AFCA Coach of the Year (1992); FWAA Coach of the Year (1992); George Munger Award (1992); Walter Camp Coach of the Year (1992); AP SEC Coach of the Year (1992); SEC Coach of the Year (1992)
23	Mike DuBose	1997–2000	4	47	24	23	—	0.511	16	16	—	0.500	0	2	—	1	1	0	AP SEC Coach of the Year (1999); SEC Coach of the Year (1999)
24	Dennis Franchione	2001–2002	2	25	17	8	—	0.680	10	6	—	0.625	1	0	—	0	0	0	—
25	Mike Price (Note: Price was hired in December 2002 and fired in May 2003 without coaching an official game.)	2003	1	—	—	—	—	—	—	—	—	—	—	—	—	—	—	—	—
26	Mike Shula (Note: Shula's record at the conclusion of the 2005 season was ten wins and two losses (10–2, 6–2 SEC) and six wins and six losses (6–6, 2–6 SEC) in 2006. In March 2009, the NCAA ruled that Alabama must vacate 16 victories due to sanctions stemming from textbook-related infractions discovered during the 2007 season for the 2005 and 2006 seasons. As the penalty to vacate victories does not result in a loss (or forfeiture) of the affected contests or award a victory to the opponent, the official NCAA record for these years are 0–2 and 0–6 respectively.)	2003–2006	4	49	10	23	—	0.303	5	19	—	0.208	0	1	—	0	0	0	—
Int	Joe Kines (Note: Joe Kines was named interim head coach for the 2006 Independence Bowl, following the termination of Mike Shula as head coach.)	2006	1	1	0	1	—	.000	—	—	—	—	0	1	—	—	—	—	—
27	Nick Saban^{†} (Note: Saban’s record at the conclusion of the 2007 season was seven wins and six losses (7–6, 4–4 SEC). In March 2009, the NCAA ruled that Alabama must vacate five victories due to sanctions stemming from textbook-related infractions discovered during the 2007 season. As the penalty to vacate victories does not result in a loss (or forfeiture) of the affected contests or award a victory to the opponent, the official NCAA record for 2007 is 2–6.)	2007–2023	17	235	206	29	—	0.877	120	18	—	0.870	16	6	—	11	9	6 – 2009, 2011, 2012, 2015, 2017, 2020	AP Coach of the Year (2008); Eddie Robinson Coach of the Year (2008); Home Depot Coach of the Year (2008); Liberty Mutual Coach of the Year Award (2008); Sporting News College Football Coach of the Year (2008); Walter Camp Coach of the Year (2008); AP SEC Coach of the Year (2009); SEC Coach of the Year (2008, 2009, 2016); Paul "Bear" Bryant Award
28	Kalen DeBoer	2024–present	2	28	20	8	—	0.714	12	4	—	0.750	1	2	—	—	0	0	—
