= Javier Arenas (American football) =

American gridiron football player (born 1987)

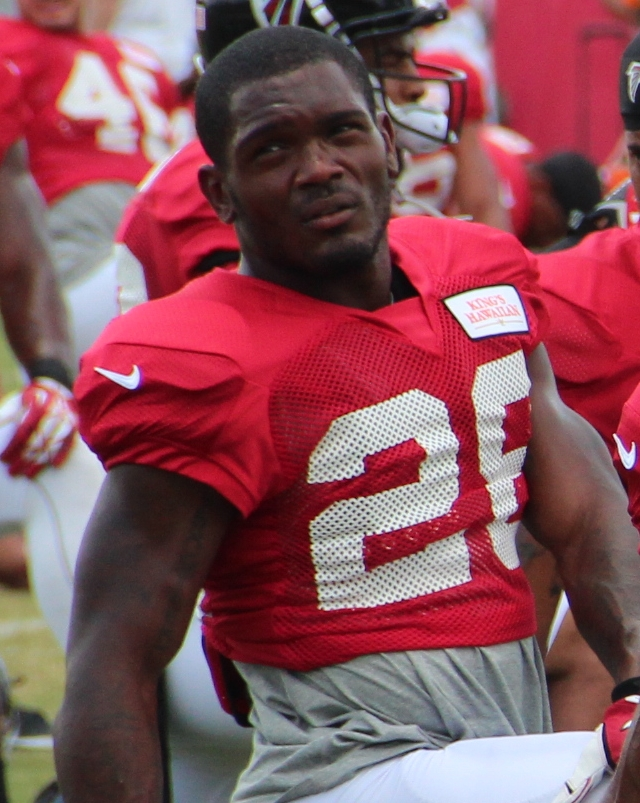
- Arenas with the Atlanta Falcons in 2014

No. 21, 35, 28
- Position: Cornerback

Personal information
- Born: October 28, 1987 (age 39); Tampa, Florida, U.S.
- Listed height: 5 ft 9 in (1.75 m)
- Listed weight: 197 lb (89 kg)

Career information
- High school: Robinson (Tampa)
- College: Alabama
- NFL draft: 2010: 2nd round, 50th overall pick

Career history

Playing
- Kansas City Chiefs (2010–2012); Arizona Cardinals (2013); Atlanta Falcons (2014); New York Jets (2015)*; Buffalo Bills (2016)*; Ottawa Redblacks (2017)*
- * Offseason or practice squad member only

Coaching
- Alabama (2018–2020) Analyst

Awards and highlights
- As player: BCS national champion (2010); Consensus All-American (2009); SEC Special Teams Player of the Year (2009); First-team All-SEC (2009); Second-team All-SEC (2008); As coach: CFP national champion (2020)

Career NFL statistics
- Total tackles: 157
- Sacks: 5.0
- Forced fumbles: 4
- Interceptions: 2
- Total return yards: 2,576
- Total touchdowns: 1
- Stats at Pro Football Reference
- Stats at CFL.ca

Javier E. Arenas (born October 28, 1987) is an American former professional football player who was a cornerback in the National Football League (NFL). Arenas played college football for the Alabama Crimson Tide, earned consensus All-American honors, and was a member of a BCS National Championship team. He was selected by the Kansas City Chiefs in the second round of the 2010 NFL draft. He was also a member of the Arizona Cardinals, Atlanta Falcons, New York Jets, and Buffalo Bills of the National Football League (NFL), and the Ottawa Redblacks of the Canadian Football League (CFL).

== Early life ==
Arenas was born in Tampa, Florida. He attended Robinson High School in Tampa, where he was a first-team All-Suncoast selection in football and a track star. In high school football, he was a highly regarded punt returner and defensive back. He was named USA Navy Player of the Week and Bright House Player of the Week in 2005. He set the record for most punt and kick returns for touchdowns at Robinson as a senior, with four punt-return touchdowns and three kickoff returns for scores, scoring 16 touchdowns overall.

In track & field, Arenas was an standout sprinter, competing in the 200-meter dash, with a personal-best time of 22.9 seconds, and in the 400-meter dash, with a personal-best time of 51.48 seconds. He was also a member of the Knights relay teams, running PR of 42.9 seconds in the 4 × 100m, 1:32.31 minutes in the 4 × 200m and 3:30.08 minutes in the 4 × 400m.

Regarded as a three-star recruit by Rivals, Arenas chose Alabama over Florida Atlantic.

== College career ==
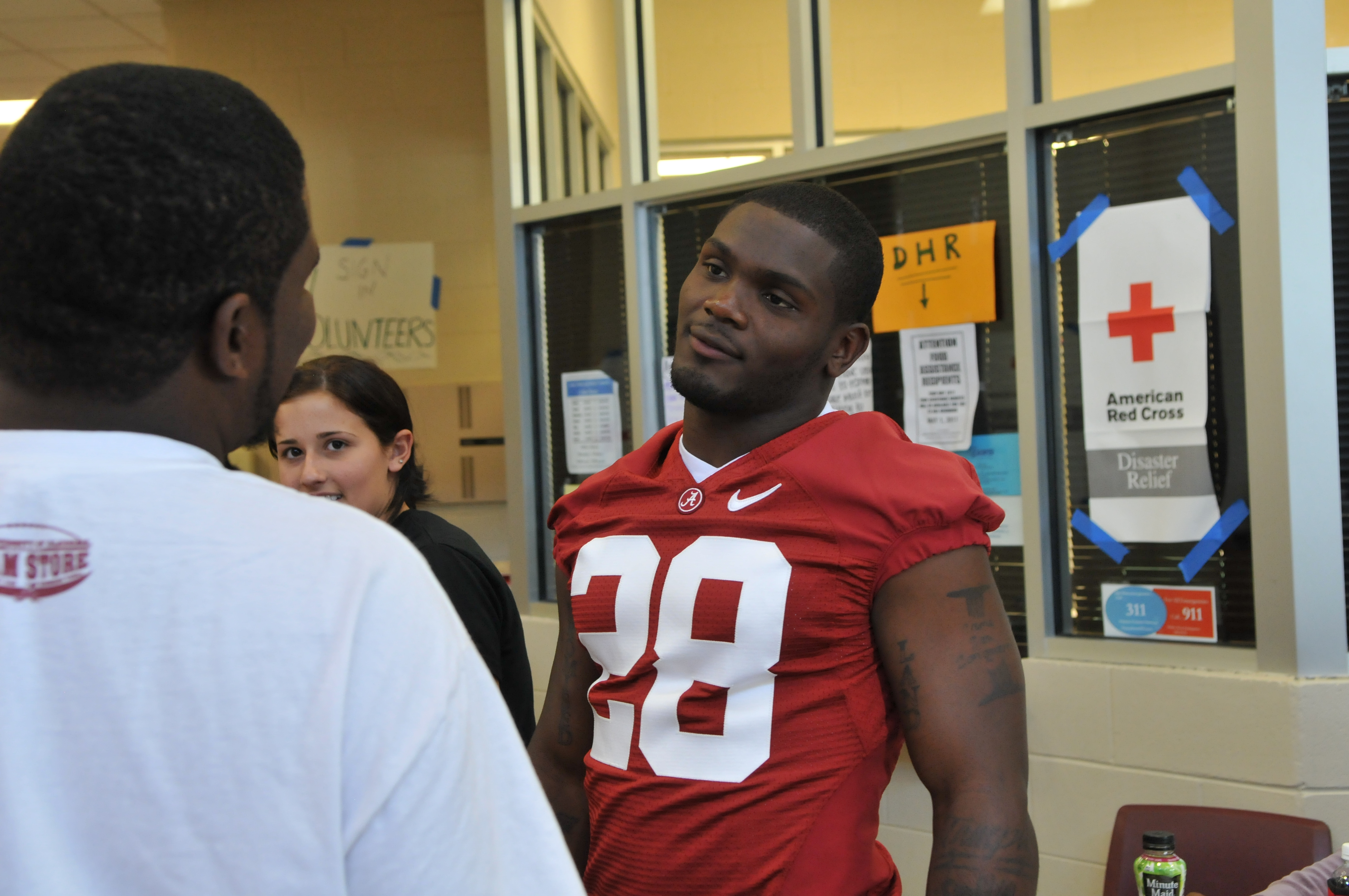
Arenas in May 2011, volunteering for the American Red Cross

Arenas attended the University of Alabama, where he played for coaches Mike Shula, Joe Kines, and Nick Saban from 2006 to 2009.

In the 2006 season, Arenas recorded two punt return touchdowns, one against Florida International and one against Oklahoma State in the Independence Bowl. Arenas was the Crimson Tide's primary kick and punt returner.

In the 2007 season, Arenas recorded a 61-yard punt return touchdown against LSU. Arenas continued to be the Crimson Tide's primary kick and punt returner. He led the SEC in punt return yards with 323.

In the 2008 season, Arenas recorded one pick-six, which came against Arkansas, and three punt return touchdowns, which came against Tulane, Mississippi State, and Utah in the Sugar Bowl. As the Crimson Tide's primary returner, Arenas led the nation in punt returns, punt return yards, and punt return touchdowns.

In the 2009 season, Arenas was once again the Crimson Tide's primary kick and punt returner. On November 21, 2009, Arenas broke Derek Abney's Southeastern Conference (SEC) record for career punt return touchdowns by returning his seventh punt return for a touchdown against the Chattanooga Mocs in Bryant–Denny Stadium. Following his senior season, he was a first-team All-SEC selection and was recognized as a consensus first-team All-American. The 2009 Crimson Tide completed an undefeated 14–0 season, beat the Florida Gators 32–13 to win the 2009 SEC Championship Game. Alabama defeated the Texas Longhorns 37–21 to win the 2010 BCS National Championship. In his final collegiate season, he led the SEC in punt return yards.

Arenas left Alabama with 1,752 punt return yards and 2,166 kickoff return yards, both school records, along with his career average of 14 yards per punt return.

== Professional career ==
Pre-draft measurables
Height	Weight	Arm length	Hand span	40-yard dash	10-yard split	20-yard split	Broad jump
5 ft 8 5/8 in (1.74 m)	197 lb (89 kg)	30 7/8 in (0.78 m)	9 1/2 in (0.24 m)	4.60 s	1.63 s	2.68 s	9 ft 4 in (2.84 m)
All values from NFL Combine

=== Kansas City Chiefs ===
Arenas was selected by the Kansas City Chiefs in the second round, 50th overall of the 2010 NFL draft. The Chiefs previously traded tight end Tony Gonzalez to the Atlanta Falcons to acquire the pick used to select Arenas. On July 28, 2010, Arenas signed a 4-year, $3.798 million contract with the Chiefs. In the 2010 season, he had 39 punt returns for 322 net yards and 24 kick returns for 509 net yards.

Arenas scored his first career touchdown on October 23, 2011, against the Oakland Raiders, on a seven-yard rush. Arenas finished the 2011 season with two interceptions, 33 tackles, and one sack. He recovered a fumble in the game against the Pittsburgh Steelers.

For the 2012 season, Arenas tallied 53 solo tackles and one forced fumble in 16 games played. He logged 204 yards in kickoff returns and 297 yards in punt returns on special teams.

=== Arizona Cardinals ===
On May 1, 2013, Arenas was traded to the Arizona Cardinals in exchange for Anthony Sherman. He handled a large majority of the kickoff return duties for the Cardinals in 2013.

=== Atlanta Falcons ===
On March 18, 2014, Arenas signed a one-year contract with the Atlanta Falcons. Arenas appeared in six games for the Falcons in the 2014 season.

=== New York Jets ===
Arenas was signed by the New York Jets on August 11, 2015. He was waived on August 30.

=== Buffalo Bills ===
On February 3, 2016, Arenas signed a futures contract with the Buffalo Bills. On August 7, 2016, Arenas was released by the Bills.

=== Ottawa Redblacks ===
On March 2, 2017, Arenas signed with the Ottawa Redblacks of the Canadian Football League (CFL). He was released by the Redblacks on June 18, 2017.

=== NFL statistics ===
Year	Team	GP	COMB	TOTAL	AST	SACK	FR	INT	TD	PD
2010	KC	16	43	36	7	3.0	0	0	0	8
2011	KC	15	33	26	7	1.0	1	2	0	6
2012	KC	16	60	53	7	0.0	0	0	0	8
2013	ARI	16	12	11	1	1.0	0	0	0	0
2014	ATL	6	9	9	0	0.0	0	0	0	1
Career		69	157	135	22	5.0	1	2	1	23

== Personal life ==
Javier grew up on the east side of Tampa. He is the cousin of former NBA point guard Gilbert Arenas. His brother, Armando Murillo, was a Golden Helmet winner at Robinson High School in Tampa, and started at defensive back for Nebraska in 2007 and 2008.

Javier Arenas is of Cuban descent.

On May 21, 2011, Arenas graced the cover of Sports Illustrated after an EF4 tornado tore through Tuscaloosa during the April 2011 Super Outbreak.

Arenas is currently assisting the defensive backs and punt returners at his alma mater, The University of Alabama. 2017 was his first year back at the university in a coaching capacity, and won a CFP national title while helping his Tide defeat the University of Georgia Bulldogs, led by his former defensive coordinator, Kirby Smart.
