= Andre Smith (offensive tackle) =

American football player (born 1987)

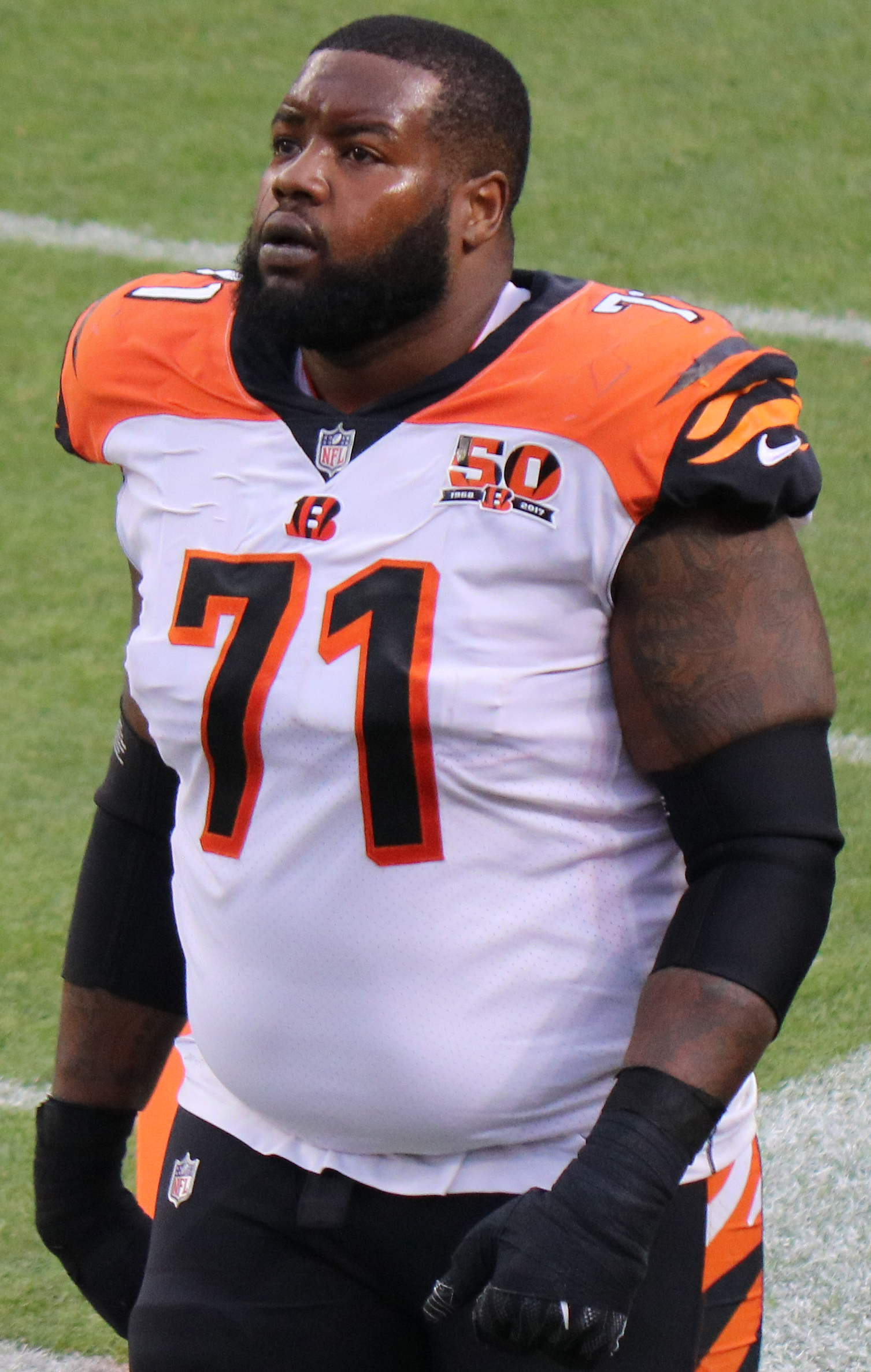
- Smith with the Cincinnati Bengals in 2017

No. 71, 76
- Position: Offensive tackle

Personal information
- Born: January 25, 1987 (age 39); Birmingham, Alabama, U.S.
- Listed height: 6 ft 4 in (1.93 m)
- Listed weight: 335 lb (152 kg)

Career information
- High school: Huffman (Birmingham)
- College: Alabama (2006–2008)
- NFL draft: 2009: 1st round, 6th overall pick

Career history
- Cincinnati Bengals (2009–2015); Minnesota Vikings (2016); Cincinnati Bengals (2017); Arizona Cardinals (2018); Cincinnati Bengals (2018–2019); Baltimore Ravens (2019–2021)

Awards and highlights
- Outland Trophy (2008); Jim Parker Trophy (2008); Jacobs Blocking Trophy (2007); Unanimous All-American (2008); 2× First-team All-SEC (2007, 2008)

Career NFL statistics
- Games played: 121
- Games started: 98
- Stats at Pro Football Reference

Andre Dewayne Smith Jr. (born January 25, 1987) is an American former professional football player who was an offensive tackle in the National Football League (NFL). He played college football for the Alabama Crimson Tide, earning unanimous All-American honors in 2008. He was selected by the Cincinnati Bengals in the first round of the 2009 NFL draft with the sixth overall pick. He also played for the Minnesota Vikings, Arizona Cardinals, and Baltimore Ravens.

== Early life ==
Smith was born in Birmingham, Alabama. He attended Huffman High School in Birmingham, where he played football and competed in track. In football, he was a three-year starter, a two-time All-State selection, and Class 6A Lineman of the Year in 2005. After registering 88 pancake blocks his senior season, Smith was selected "Mr. Football" by the Alabama Sports Writers Association, becoming the only offensive lineman to ever win the honor in the association's 23-year history. Smith earned High School All-American honors by USA Today and was selected to play in the 2006 U.S. Army All-American Bowl. He was also one of four finalists for the 2005 Walter Payton Trophy, given to the nation's most athletic high school football player.

In addition to football, Smith also participated in track and field at Huffman. As a senior in 2006, Smith competed in the throwing events at the State Track & Field Meet, where he registered throws of 14.81 meters (48'7.25") in the shot put and 39.62 meters in the discus throw (126'8") that earned him sixth and eleventh-place finishes, respectively.

Regarded as a five-star recruit by both Rivals.com and Scout.com, Smith was listed as the No. 1 offensive lineman by both recruiting services. Rivals described him as "one of the most dominant offensive line prospects in the last 10 years," and—after reevaluating their 2005–'09 rankings in February 2009—considered him the best offensive tackle prospect of that period. Mike Farrell of The Sporting News called Smith "the best offensive line prospect since Orlando Pace."

== College career ==
Smith attended the University of Alabama beginning in 2006. In 2006, he played for Coach Mike Shula (and Coach Joe Kines). In 2007 and 2008, he played for coach Nick Saban's Alabama Crimson Tide football teams. In his initial year at Alabama, he started all 13 games at left tackle, becoming only the fourth true freshman offensive lineman to start for the Crimson Tide. Smith played at least 65 snaps in 10 of 13 games and played more than 70 snaps five times, while leading the Crimson Tide with 62 pancake blocks. He also scored a touchdown off of a lateral in the 34–31 Independence Bowl loss against Oklahoma State. Smith earned Freshman All-American honors by the Football Writers Association of America.

In 2007, Smith was a first-team All-Southeastern Conference selection, after starting every game at the left tackle position. He was named Alabama Co-Player of the Week four times during the season.

Smith was recognized as a unanimous All-American in 2008, as well as the 2008 Outland Trophy winner. He was also considered to be one of the best underclassmen for the 2009 NFL draft. He was also a first-team All-SEC selection and shared the league's Jacobs Blocking Trophy with Arkansas center Jonathan Luigs. He led the team with 103 key knockdowns and added seven blocks downfield. He was penalized just twice and he allowed just one QB sack and six pressures on 334 pass plays.

On December 29, 2008, Smith was suspended from playing in the 2009 Sugar Bowl,—a game Alabama lost 31–17 to the Utah Utes—, reportedly because he dealt with an agent. A few days later, Smith declared himself eligible for the 2009 NFL draft, and at the time he was considered a lock to be a Top 5 pick.

=== College awards and honors ===
- 2006 SEC All-Freshman First-team
- 2007 AP All-SEC First-team
- 2007 Playboy All-American
- 2008 Outland Trophy
- 2008 AP All-SEC First-team
- 2008 AP All-American
- 2008 AFCA All-American
- 2008 CBS All-American
- 2008 ESPN All-American
- 2008 FWAA All-American
- 2008 Pro Football Weekly All-American
- 2008 Rivals.com All-American
- 2008 Sporting News All-American
- 2008 Sports Illustrated All-American
- 2008 Walter Camp All-American

== Professional career ==
=== Pre-draft ===
Widely believed to be the best run-blocking tackle in the 2009 NFL draft, Smith drew comparisons to Jason Peters. At the 2009 NFL Combine, Smith weighed 332 pounds. He also looked out of shape as he ran 40 yards shirtless, clocking at a slow 5.28, and had a disappointing 19 repetitions on the bench with 225 pounds.

He decided to leave the combine early in order to prepare for Alabama's Pro Day on March 11, 2009. Smith, however, did not inform his group leader at the combine before he left, and later apologized, stating: "If I had the chance to do it all over, I wouldn't have handled it the way I did. I should have told my group leader that I was leaving, and I didn't. I didn't mean to ruffle any feathers or step on any toes. I didn't mean to grandstand anyone at the combine. That was not my intention at all, and I apologize for my mistake." Smith also admitted that he wasn't prepared or in shape.

His Pro Day performance at Alabama on March 11, 2009, was equally unimpressive, although his weight was down to 325 pounds. It was expected that his poor performances at the Combine and at Pro Day would strongly impact his draft positioning. Initially thought of as the best offensive tackle in the draft and a possible No. 1 pick, Smith was moved to third among offensive tackles (commonly behind Jason Smith and Eugene Monroe) after the combine.

Pre-draft measurables
Height	Weight	Arm length	Hand span	40-yard dash	10-yard split	20-yard split	20-yard shuttle	Three-cone drill	Vertical jump	Broad jump	Bench press	Wonderlic
6 ft 4 in (1.93 m)	332 lb (151 kg)	35 3/8 in (0.90 m)	9 3/4 in (0.25 m)	5.28 s	1.79 s	3.01 s	4.93 s	7.88 s	25.0 in (0.64 m)	7 ft 10 in (2.39 m)	19 reps	17
All values from NFL Combine/Alabama Pro Day

=== Cincinnati Bengals (first stint) ===
==== 2009 season ====
Smith was selected in the first round with the sixth overall pick by the Cincinnati Bengals. He was the first Alabama offensive lineman selected in the first round of an NFL Draft since Chris Samuels in 2000. With run-blocking being his premier quality, Smith was projected to start at right tackle for the Bengals. However, after a 30-day contract impasse, Smith missed all of training camp and three preseason games, before eventually signing his contract on August 30, 2009. It is believed that Smith was looking for a five-year, $40 million deal, but was signed to a four-year contract with only $21 million guaranteed. The Bengals also had an option in his contract after the 2010 season to make it a six-year, $42 million agreement.

Just days after ending his holdout, Smith fractured his left foot during a non-contact drill at training camp in his first week of practice after missing most of preseason. He was on roster exemption for the season opener game against the Denver Broncos on September 13, then was added to the active roster the next day and returned to practice in week 7, being inactive for Games 2–10. He played in Games 11–16, and was credited with one start. He made his NFL debut on November 29 against the Cleveland Browns. On December 13, 2009, Smith was credited with his first official start when usual starting right tackle Dennis Roland lined up as the extra tight end in the Bengals unbalanced line. He supported three individual 100-yard rushing efforts over the season's final six games, and aided a Bengals playoff record of 169 rushing yards by running back Cedric Benson in the wild card playoff game against the New York Jets.

==== 2010 season ====
In his second season with the Bengals, Smith claimed the starting right tackle position, playing in Weeks 6, 7, and 8, but then suffered a foot fracture (fifth metatarsal) in practice on November 10, forcing the Bengals to place him on injured reserve with a broken foot and effectively ending his season after playing in seven of the eight regular season games to that date.

==== 2011 season ====
In the 2011 preseason, it was reported that Smith was working out and getting fully fit. It was also reported that in the preseason, he spoke with the Bengals starting left tackle, Andrew Whitworth, about how "it's my time to step up." The 2011 season became Smith's breakout year, and he became the starting right tackle for the Cincinnati Bengals. He started there in games 1-12 and 15–16, as well as the wild card playoff game, contributing to pass protection that ranked tied for fourth in the NFL in fewest sacks allowed (25). He was inactive for games 13-14 due to an ankle injury. In week 1 at Cleveland, he averted a giveaway by recovering an Andy Dalton fumble at the Bengals eight-yard line. In week 6 against the Indianapolis Colts, he supported a pass-protection effort that held the Colts for the first time on the season without a sack, playing primarily against All-Pro defensive end Robert Mathis. He aided a 165-yard rushing effort in week 16 against the Arizona Cardinals.

==== 2012 season ====
In 2012, Smith started all 16 games, including the wild card playoff game. He helped running back BenJarvus Green-Ellis rank first in the league in third-and-one rushing conversions (93.3 percent success rate, on 14 of 15) and was part of a run-blocking effort for Green-Ellis to gain at least 100 yards four times in a five-game stretch (Games 10-12 and 14), with 168.2 team average in that span. He also supported a season-best 221 rushing yards, with 6.5 average, on November 25 against the Oakland Raiders.

==== 2013 season ====
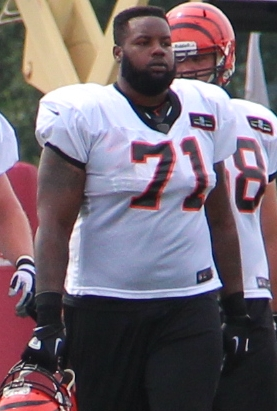
Smith with the Cincinnati Bengals in 2013

On April 26, 2013, Smith re-signed with the Bengals. It was reported by NFL.com's Ian Rapoport that Smith agreed to a three-year, $18 million contract during the second round of the 2013 NFL draft. He started in games 1-11 and 13–16 at right tackle, and came off bench in week 12, helping the Bengals rank tied for sixth in scoring and tenth in net offense. He was a key cog in pass protection, allowing only one sack over games 11–14, tying a team record for fewest sacks allowed in a four-game span. On September 16 against the Pittsburgh Steelers, he helped the offensive line allow no sacks with 407 net yards. He aided a blocking effort in week 6 at Buffalo in which the Bengals offense tallied a season-high in total net yards with 483 yards, including season-highs in both rushing (165) and passing (318). On October 27 against the New York Jets, he contributed to pass protection allowing only one sack for two yards as Andy Dalton threw for a career-best five touchdown passes. In week 14 against Indianapolis, he helped keep Dalton sack-free for the third straight game and supported a 155-yard rushing effort, and Dalton was named AFC Offensive Player of Week with a 120.5 passer rating. In the wild card playoff game on January 5, 2014, he contributed to a 439-yard offensive output against the San Diego Chargers.

==== 2014 season ====
Smith missed all of the 2014 preseason while rehabbing from a concussion, but was able to start in the season opener game. He played and started in nine games played on the season. He was inactive for games 9–10, and was placed on Reserve/Injured list on November 25, following a triceps injury suffered in week 11. He played a key role in the Bengals pass protection for the nine games he played, helping the Bengals finish the season ranked third in the NFL in fewest sacks allowed with 23 and in least sack yardage allowed (123 yards). He was part of an offensive line that allowed no sacks in the first three weeks of the season for first time in franchise history. He was credited by coaches with the key block on Giovani Bernard’s 89-yard touchdown run, the second-longest in Bengals history, on October 12 against the Carolina Panthers. He helped pave the way for three one-yard touchdown runs in goal line situations in week 8 against the Baltimore Ravens, including the game-winning touchdown by Andy Dalton on a fourth-and-one situation late in the fourth quarter.

==== 2015 season ====
Smith started in 14 games (Games 1-7 and 10–16) at right tackle, and also started wild card playoff game. He missed games 8-9 due to a concussion suffered on November 1 at Pittsburgh. On September 13 at Oakland, he helped lead pass protection that allowed no sacks and supported 396 yards of net offense. The following week, he contributed with a second straight sack-free game against the San Diego Chargers, in which the rushing offense put up 175 yards on the ground. In week 3, he provided pass protection for Andy Dalton to register a career-high 383 yards on September 27 against the Baltimore Ravens. The next week against the Kansas City Chiefs, he provided a key block for a 13-yard touchdown run by Giovani Bernard and helped allow no sacks as Bengals posted the first game in franchise history with more than 300 net passing yards (321) and four rushing touchdowns. On October 11 against the Seattle Seahawks, he helped the offense accumulate 419 total yards and score 17 points in the fourth quarter to overcome a 24–7 deficit. In week 6 at Buffalo, he helped allow no sacks as Andy Dalton posted 118.6 passer rating, with three scores and no interceptions. He supported a season-high passer rating (146.8) for Andy Dalton on December 6 at Cleveland, with only one sack allowed. On Dec 20 at San Francisco, he supported a 115.6 passer rating for A. J. McCarron in his first NFL start.

=== Minnesota Vikings ===
On March 18, 2016, Smith signed a one-year contract with the Minnesota Vikings worth up to $3.5 million with $500,000 guaranteed.

Smith's first season with the Vikings was cut short after suffering a season-ending triceps injury in Week 4. On October 11, 2016, he was placed on injured reserve.

=== Cincinnati Bengals (second stint) ===
On March 14, 2017, Smith signed a one-year contract to return to the Bengals. He began the season as a backup after losing the starting right guard spot to Trey Hopkins. He became the team's starting right tackle in Week 10 after losing Jake Fisher to injury. He was placed on injured reserve on December 20, 2017, with a knee injury.

=== Arizona Cardinals ===
On March 16, 2018, Smith signed a two-year contract with the Arizona Cardinals. He started eight games at right tackle, missing three with an elbow injury, before being released on November 26, 2018.

=== Cincinnati Bengals (third stint) ===
On November 29, 2018, Smith signed a one-year contract with the Bengals.

He signed another one-year contract with them on July 25, 2019. He started the first five games at left tackle following an injury to Cordy Glenn. On November 30, 2019, Smith was waived by the Bengals.

=== Baltimore Ravens ===
On January 8, 2020, the Ravens signed Smith for the remainder of the 2019–20 season.

On February 6, 2020, Smith signed a one-year contract extension with the Ravens. On July 28, 2020, Smith chose to opt out of the 2020 season due to the COVID-19 pandemic.

On August 31, 2021, Smith was released by the Ravens and re-signed to the practice squad the next day. On September 10, 2021, Smith was released. He was released on September 10, 2021, and re-signed five days later. On September 19, 2021, Smith was re-signed to the practice squad. On October 2, 2021, Smith was promoted to the active roster. In total, Smith was elevated to the Ravens' active roster in five out of their first six games, thrice as a COVID-19 replacement and twice as a standard elevation, and was returned to the practice squad after each game. He was released on November 2, 2021.

== Personal life ==
His younger brother, Christian Smith, formerly played wide receiver and cornerback at Hampton University. He is also a cousin of Dominic Lee, a former defensive lineman for the Alabama Crimson Tide and Desmond Jennings, a professional baseball outfielder.
