= 1975 Orange Bowl =

American college football game

- 41st Orange Bowl
- The Miami Orange Bowl in Miami, Florida, hosted the Orange Bowl.
Notre Dame Fighting Irish	Alabama Crimson Tide
(9–2)	(11–0)
Independent	SEC
13	11
Head coach: Ara Parseghian	Head coach: Bear Bryant
AP / Coaches; 9 / 8	AP / Coaches; 2 / 1
	1	2	3	4	Total
Notre Dame	7	6	0	0	13
Alabama	0	3	0	8	11
- Date: January 1, 1975
- Season: 1974
- Stadium: Orange Bowl
- Location: Miami, Florida
- MVP: Wayne Bullock (Notre Dame FB); Leroy Cook (Alabama DE)
- Favorite: Alabama by 9 to 10 points
- Referee: Robert Fallon (Big Ten) (split crew between Big Ten and SEC)
- Attendance: 71,801

United States TV coverage
- Network: NBC
- Announcers: Jim Simpson and John Brodie
- Nielsen ratings: 28.8

The 1975 Orange Bowl was the 41st edition of the college football bowl game, played at the Orange Bowl in Miami, Florida, on Wednesday, January 1. Part of the 1974–75 bowl game season, it matched the ninth-ranked independent Notre Dame Fighting Irish and the undefeated #2 Alabama Crimson Tide of the Southeastern Conference (SEC). It was a rematch of the previous season's Sugar Bowl. In a game dominated by both defenses, underdog Notre Dame held on to upset the Tide, 13–11.

== Teams ==
=== Notre Dame ===
Notre Dame went 9–2 in the regular season, with losses to Purdue and USC. Following Notre Dame's victory over Navy, Orange Bowl officials announced an invitation to Notre Dame and Alabama. This was Notre Dame's sixth bowl game appearance and their second Orange Bowl. It was notable as Ara Parseghian's final game as head coach, as he announced his resignation from the position December 15. He was succeeded by Dan Devine, the head coach of the NFL's Green Bay Packers for four seasons, and previously led Missouri (1958–1970) and Arizona State (1955–1957).

=== Alabama ===
Alabama won all eleven games in the regular season and were conference champions. Following Alabama's victory over Mississippi State, Orange Bowl officials announced Alabama had accepted an invitation to play against Notre Dame in a rematch of the previous year's Sugar Bowl. It was Alabama's 28th bowl game appearance and seventh Orange Bowl.

Undefeated Alabama was first in the UPI coaches poll (#2 in AP poll) and favored by nine to ten points.

== Game summary ==
Earlier in the evening in California, fifth-ranked USC won the Rose Bowl by a point over #3 Ohio State. Top-ranked Oklahoma was bowl ineligible, and #4 Michigan was also idle, as this was the final season that the Big Ten Conference (and Pac-8) allowed just one bowl team.

The final game of New Year's Day, the Orange Bowl kicked off at night; midway through the first quarter, Alabama's Willie Shelby fumbled a punt that was recovered by Notre Dame's Al Samuel at the Crimson Tide 16-yard line. Five plays later, the Irish scored on a four-yard Wayne Bullock touchdown run to take a 7–0 lead. Their lead was extended to 13–0 midway through the second quarter after Mark McLane scored on a nine-yard touchdown run to cap a 17-play drive that covered 77 yards. A 21-yard field goal by Danny Ridgeway cut the lead to 13–3 at the half.

After a scoreless third, the Crimson Tide scored a late touchdown on a 48-yard Richard Todd touchdown pass to Russ Schamun, and with a successful two-point conversion closed the gap to 13–11. After a defensive stop, Alabama got the ball back at its own 38 with under two minutes remaining, needing only a field goal to win. After two completions, the ball was on the Irish 38; Todd missed an open Ozzie Newsome and threw an interception to Reggie Barnett, effectively ending the comeback for the Tide. Bullock was the leading rusher at 83 yards, and was named the game's outstanding player, with Alabama defensive end Leroy Cook.

== Aftermath ==
In an era of few postseason games, this was Alabama's sixteenth consecutive bowl appearance, but was the eighth straight without a victory (0–7–1). Their last postseason win was in January 1967; starting with the next season, the Tide won six consecutive bowl games.

=== Scoring ===
Scoring summary

Quarter	Time	Drive			Team	Scoring information	Score	
Quarter	Time	Plays	Yards	TOP	Team	Scoring information	Notre Dame	Alabama
1	6:41	5	16	1:30	Notre Dame	Wayne Bullock 4-yard touchdown run, Dave Reeve kick good	7	0
2	8:29	17	77	7:21	Notre Dame	Mark McLane 9-yard touchdown run, Reeve kick no good	13	0
2	1:45	10	36	4:01	Alabama	21-yard field goal by Danny Ridgeway	13	3
4	3:13	4	53	1:16	Alabama	Russ Schamun 48-yard touchdown reception from Richard Todd, 2-point pass good	13	11
"TOP" = time of possession. For other American football terms, see Glossary of American football.							13	11

== Statistics ==
Statistics	Notre Dame	Alabama
First downs	15	14
Rushes–yards	66–185	33–62
Passing yards	19	223
Passes (C–A–I)	4–8–2	15–29–2
Total Offense	74–204	62–285
Punts–average	6–38.0	7–40.0
Fumbles–lost	1–1	5–2
Turnovers	3	4
Penalties–yards	1–15	1–5
