= 2006 Independence Bowl =

2006 PetroSun Independence Bowl
Oklahoma State Cowboys	Alabama Crimson Tide
(6–6)	(6–6 (Note: Alabama later vacated all wins during the season for an official record of 0–7.))
Big 12	SEC
34	31
Head coach: Mike Gundy	Head coach: Joe Kines
	1	2	3	4	Total
Oklahoma State	7	17	0	10	34
Alabama	7	7	3	14	31
- Date: December 28 (Thursday), 2006
- Season: 2006
- Stadium: Independence Stadium
- Location: Shreveport, Louisiana
- MVP: OSU RB Jackson Almeida
- National anthem: Richard Street
- Referee: Tom Zimorski (ACC)
- Attendance: 45,054
- Payout: US$2,200,000

United States TV coverage
- Network: ESPN
- Announcers: Gary Thorne (Play by Play); Andre Ware (Analyst); Todd Harris (Sideline)

The 2006 PetroSun Independence Bowl, part of the 2006–07 NCAA football bowl season, took place on December 28, 2006 at Independence Stadium in Shreveport, Louisiana. The competing teams were the Oklahoma State Cowboys, from the Big 12 Conference, and the Alabama Crimson Tide, representing the Southeastern Conference. Oklahoma State won the game, 34–31.

This was the only 2006–07 bowl game in which both teams finished 6–6 in the regular season, and the first meeting between the programs on the gridiron. With the dismissal of Alabama head coach Mike Shula occurring in November, Joe Kines served as the Tide's head coach for this contest, with Nick Saban being hired as coach the following January.

== Game summary ==
Alabama played Oklahoma State in the Independence Bowl on December 28, 2006. The Cowboys scored first on a Dantrell Savage 1-yard touchdown run to lead, 7–0. Alabama responded later in the first quarter on a Matt Caddell 18-yard touchdown reception from John Parker Wilson to tie the game at 7–7. Oklahoma State responded with 10 consecutive points on a Keith Toston 4-yard touchdown run and later on a 28-yard field goal by Jason Ricks to take a 17-7 lead. Alabama responded with Tim Castille 1-yard touchdown run, only to have the Cowboys get a Keith Toston 7-yard touchdown run to take a 24-14 lead at the half.

After bringing the score to 24-17 in the third on a 24-yard field goal by Jamie Christensen, Oklahoma State responded with an Adarius Bowman 10-yard touchdown reception from Bobby Reid early in the fourth to extend their lead to 31–17. The Tide responded with 14 straight points on an 86-yard punt return by Javier Arenas and a throwback to offensive tackle Andre Smith at the 2-yard line to even the score at 31–31. The Cowboys would seal the victory with only 00:08 remaining in the game on a 27-yard, game-winning field goal by Jason Ricks. For the game, the Cowboys' 34 points and 419 yards were the most allowed by the Alabama defense for the 2006 season.

Scoring summary

Quarter	Time	Drive			Team	Scoring information	Score	
Quarter	Time	Plays	Yards	TOP	Team	Scoring information	Oklahoma State	Alabama
1	9:46		7 plays, 38 yards	2:44	Oklahoma State	Dantrell Savage 1-yard touchdown run, Jason Ricks kick good	7	0
1	3:32		9 plays, 72 yards	3:29	Alabama	Matt Caddell 18-yard touchdown reception from John Parker Wilson, Jamie Christensen kick good	7	7
2	11:12		5 plays, 42 yards	1:58	Oklahoma State	Keith Toston 4-yard touchdown run, Jason Ricks kick good	14	7
2	6:45		9 plays, 46 yards	3:31	Oklahoma State	28-yard field goal by Jason Ricks	17	7
2	2:30		9 plays, 80 yards	4:15	Alabama	Tim Castille 1-yard touchdown run, Jamie Christensen kick good	17	14
2	00:41		8 plays, 64 yards	1:49	Oklahoma State	Keith Toston 7-yard touchdown run, Jason Ricks kick good	24	14
3	8:39		15 plays, 69 yards	6:21	Alabama	24-yard field goal by Jamie Christensen	24	17
4	14:02		10 plays, 66 yards	3:18	Oklahoma State	Adarius Bowman 10-yard touchdown reception from Bobby Reid, Jason Ricks kick good	31	17
4	10:50		Punt return	0	Alabama	86-yard punt return by Javier Arenas, Jamie Christensen kick good	31	24
4	8:41		5 plays, 21 yards	2:06	Alabama	Andre Smith 2-yard touchdown run, Jamie Christensen kick good	31	31
4	00:08		10 plays, 74 yards	3:18	Oklahoma State	27-yard field goal by Jason Ricks	34	31
"TOP" = time of possession. For other American football terms, see Glossary of American football.							34	31

== Statistics ==
Statistical comparison
	Oklahoma State	Alabama
First downs	23	18
Total yards	419	276
Passing yards	212	168
Rushing yards	207	108
Penalties	9-77	8-45
3rd-down conversions	5-13	9-16
4th-down conversions	2-2	0-0
Turnovers	2	3
Time of possession	28:09	31:51

=== Oklahoma State ===
- QB Bobby Reid: 15/29, 212 yds, TD, Int
- RB Dantrell Savage: 19 rush, 112 yds, TD
- WR Brandon Pettigrew: 4 rec, 65 yds

=== Alabama ===
- QB John Parker Wilson: 18/33, 168 yds, TD, Int
- RB Jimmy Johns: 7 rush, 39 yds
- WR D.J. Hall: 5 rec, 32 yds
