= Justin Woodall =

American baseball player (born 1987)

Free agent
- Pitcher
- Born: November 6, 1987 (age 39); Oxford, Mississippi, U.S.
- Bats: left Throws: left
- Stats at Baseball Reference
Football career
Personal information
Listed height	6 ft 2 in (1.88 m)
Listed weight	210 lb (95 kg)
Awards and highlights
SEC Champion (2009); BCS National Champion (2010)

Justin Woodall (born November 6, 1987) is an American professional baseball pitcher.

He was drafted out of high school by the New York Mets but instead decided to go to the University of Alabama to play football. In his freshman year in 2006, he had six tackles, one pass breakup, and one blocked punt. He primarily played on special teams. His Sophomore year he played in five games and was a reserve in the secondary. His junior year, he earned the starting safety position and started all 14 games. He grabbed four interceptions; one of them he returned for a 74-yard touchdown. He also had 47 tackles, 1.5 tackles for loss, and eight pass breakups. In 2009, he and the Crimson Tide went 14-0 and won the SEC Championship and the BCS National Championship. He entered for the NFL draft but was not picked. He then was drafted in the 26th round of the first MLB Player Draft by the Tampa Bay Rays. On August 23, 2012, Woodall and two teammates tested positive for a banned substance, he was suspended for 50 games by minor league baseball.
