= Keith Toston =

American football player (born 1987)

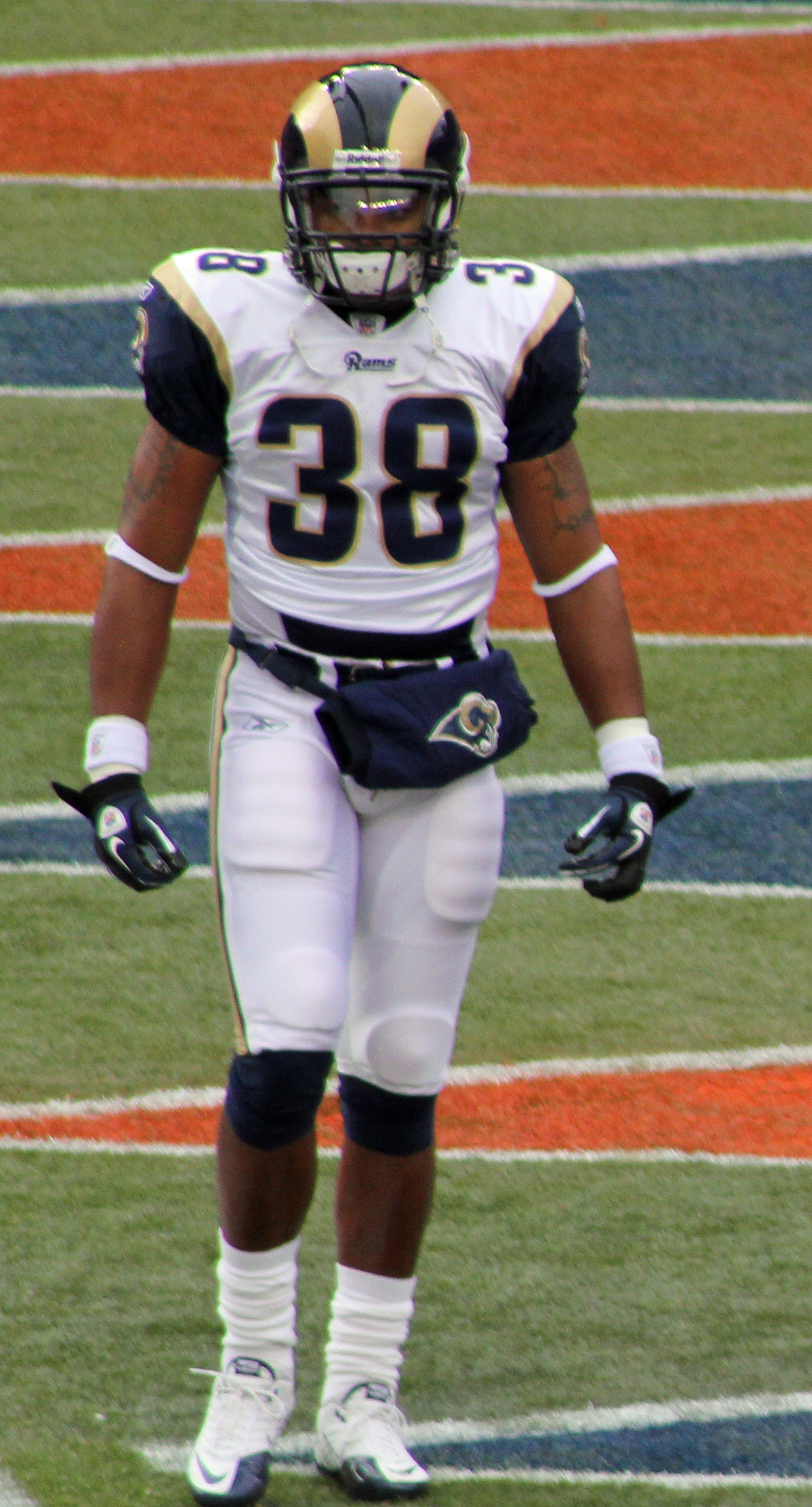
- Toston with the Rams

No. 24
- Position: Running back

Personal information
- Born: May 6, 1987 (age 39); Angleton, Texas, U.S.

Career information
- College: Oklahoma State

Career history
- 2010: St. Louis Rams
- 2012: Jacksonville Jaguars
- 2014: Saskatchewan Roughriders
- 2015: Calgary Stampeders

Awards and highlights
- First-team All-Big 12 (2009)

Career statistics
- Rushing yards: 128
- Rushing average: 3.6
- Receptions: 5
- Receiving yards: 70
- Return yards: 140
- Stats at Pro Football Reference

Keith Toston (born May 6, 1987) is an American former professional football player who was a running back in the National Football League (NFL) and Canadian Football League (CFL). After playing college football for the Oklahoma State Cowboys, Toston was undrafted in the 2010 NFL draft and was signed by the St. Louis Rams on April 25, 2010.

== Early life ==
At Angleton High School, Toston carried the ball 156 times for 1,564 yards and scored 18 touchdowns as a senior and averaged just over 10 yards per carry and as a junior, carried the ball 225 times for 1,529 yards and scored 15 touchdowns. He was a finalist for the Old Spice National High School Player of the Year award, and was District 24-4A offensive MVP as well as named all-Greater Houston and included on the Dallas Morning News' top 100 list.

== College career ==
Toston played college football for the Oklahoma State Cowboys. In 2006, as a freshman, Tosten finished with 631 rushing yards with an average of 6.0 yards per rush and six touchdowns in 12 games. In his sophomore year he fumbled the ball twice in the Troy game, causing him to fall to third string the rest of the year. In his junior year he was second string, but rose to the challenge in his senior campaign when Kendall Hunter went down with a knee injury. In 2009 as a senior he was a first-team All-Big 12 running back.

Toston was selected to play in the 85th annual East-West Shrine Game, which was played January 23, 2010, in Orlando, Florida.

Toston accumulated 473 attempts, 2725 yards, and 27 rushing touchdowns in his career at Oklahoma State.

== Professional career ==
=== Pre-draft ===
Pre-draft measurables
Height	Weight	40-yard dash	10-yard split	20-yard split	20-yard shuttle	Three-cone drill	Vertical jump	Broad jump	Bench press	Wonderlic
5 ft 10 3/4 in (1.80 m)	205 lb (93 kg)	4.60 s	1.60 s	2.64 s	4.44 s	7.28 s	32 in (0.81 m)	9 ft 2 in (2.79 m)	22 reps	x
All from NFL Combine.

=== St. Louis Rams ===
Toston was signed by the St. Louis Rams on April 25, 2010, and made the Rams' opening-day roster in 2010. Toston spent the year as the Rams' secondary back. He accumulated 54 yards on 19 carries in spot duty. On September 3, 2011, the Rams cut Toston.

=== Jacksonville Jaguars ===
Keith was signed by the Jacksonville Jaguars on August 2, 2012

=== Saskatchewan Roughriders ===
On April 4, 2014, Toston was signed by the Saskatchewan Roughriders to a 2-year deal.
