= 2006 Cotton Bowl Classic =

2006 AT&T Cotton Bowl Classic
- 70th Cotton Bowl Classic
- 2006 AT&T Cotton Bowl Classic logo
Texas Tech Red Raiders	Alabama Crimson Tide
(9–2)	(9–2 (Note: Alabama later vacated all wins during the season for an official 0–2 record.))
Big 12	SEC
10	13
Head coach: Mike Leach	Head coach: Mike Shula
AP / Coaches / BCS; 18 / 15 / 15	AP / Coaches / BCS; 13 / 13 / 13
	1	2	3	4	Total
Texas Tech	3	0	0	7	10
Alabama	7	0	3	3	13
- Date: January 2, 2006
- Season: 2005
- Stadium: Cotton Bowl
- Location: Dallas, Texas
- MVP: QB Brodie Croyle (Alabama); LB DeMeco Ryans (Alabama)
- Referee: Terry Leyden (Mtn. West)
- Payout: US$2,850,000 per team

United States TV coverage
- Network: FOX

The Cotton Bowl in Dallas, Texas, hosted the Cotton Bowl Classic.

The 2006 AT&T Cotton Bowl Classic was held on January 2, 2006, in Dallas, Texas at the Cotton Bowl. The game featured the Alabama Crimson Tide of the SEC, and the Texas Tech Red Raiders of the Big 12 Conference.

During the 2005 season, Alabama — led by quarterback Brodie Croyle — earned a 9–2 regular season record (all nine wins were later vacated by the NCAA due to violations). Following a 9–0 start, the Crimson Tide's two losses came to SEC West rivals LSU and Auburn.

Texas Tech — led by quarterback Cody Hodges — also suffered two defeats during their season, including a 52–17 defeat to eventual national champion Texas and a 24–17 loss at Oklahoma State.

In 2009, the NCAA vacated Alabama's Cotton Bowl win due to infractions committed during the season.

== Game ==
In a matchup of Alabama's first-ranked scoring defense and Texas Tech's second-ranked scoring offense, the Crimson Tide held the Red Raiders to ten points — thanks to numerous pressures and four sacks of Texas Tech senior quarterback Cody Hodges — who completed only 15 of 32 passes for 191 yards and was knocked out of the game for a period in the second half.

The Alabama defense was assisted by an efficient offense that controlled the ball much of the game and kept the defense off the field; Alabama ultimately possessed the ball for 38:56, largely thanks to Kenneth Darby, who rushed for 83 yards on 29 carries.

Alabama scored first — less than four minutes into the game — as Croyle hit sophomore wide receiver Keith Brown for a 76–yard touchdown. Replay showed Brown's knee was down when he caught the ball, but referees refused to review the only touchdown Alabama scored. Brown finished as Croyle's top target, gaining 142 yards on five catches. An Alex Trlica 34-yard field goal brought Texas Tech to within four. Alabama kicker Jamie Christensen missed a field goal from 38 yards early in the second quarter and the teams traded blocked field goals to end the first half.

Though the Crimson Tide defense kept the Red Raiders in check most of the second half, Hodges engineered late drives for Texas Tech, using both his legs (he finished as his team's top rusher, gaining 93 yards on 13 carries) and arm. He eventually hit Jarrett Hicks for a game-tying touchdown late in the fourth quarter. It was the Alabama offense that finally secured the win for the Crimson Tide, as quarterback Brodie Croyle, who completed 19 of 31 passes for 275 yards, drove his team 55 yards late in the fourth quarter to set up kicker Jamie Christensen's 45–yard game-winning field goal attempt on the final play. The kick was low, wobbly, and spinning sideways yet somehow managed to find its way through the uprights, giving Alabama the 13–10 victory.

The game-winning field goal by Christensen was the first game-ending score in a Cotton Bowl Classic since 1979, when Joe Montana brought Notre Dame from behind to defeat the University of Houston.

== Scoring summary ==
Quarter	Time	Drive	Team	Scoring information	Score	
Quarter	Time	Drive	Team	Scoring information	Texas Tech	Alabama
1	11:37	2 plays, 84 yards	Alabama	Keith Brown 76-yard touchdown reception from Brodie Croyle, Jamie Christensen kick good	0	7
1	3:00	10 plays, 69 yards	Texas Tech	34-yard field goal by Alex Trlica	3	7
3	6:53	17 plays, 67 yards	Alabama	31-yard field goal by Jamie Christensen	3	10
4	2:56	2 plays, 38 yards	Texas Tech	Jarrett Hicks 12-yard touchdown reception from Cody Hodges, Alex Trlica kick good	10	10
4	0:00	10 plays, 58 yards	Alabama	45-yard field goal by Jamie Christensen	10	13
					10	13* Win Vacated
