= Joe Kines =

American football player and coach (born 1944)

Biographical details
- Born: July 13, 1944 (age 82); Cedartown, Georgia, U.S.

Playing career
- 1964–1966: Jacksonville State

Coaching career (HC unless noted)
- 1973–1976: Jacksonville State (AHC/DC)
- 1977–1978: Clemson (LB)
- 1979–1984: Florida (DC/LB)
- 1985–1986: Alabama (DC/LB)
- 1987–1990: Tampa Bay Buccaneers (LB)
- 1991–1992: Arkansas (DC)
- 1992: Arkansas (interim HC)
- 1993–1994: Arkansas (AHC/DC)
- 1995–1999: Georgia (AHC/DC/DE)
- 2000–2002: Florida State (LB)
- 2003–2006: Alabama (DC)
- 2006: Alabama (interim HC)
- 2008–2009: Texas A&M (DC)

Head coaching record
- Overall: 3–7–1
- Bowls: 0–1

Joe Kines (born July 13, 1944) is an American former football player and coach. He spent most of his coaching career as an assistant in college football ranks, and twice serving as an interim head coach: in 1992 at the University of Arkansas after the firing of Jack Crowe after Arkansas's first game, and in 2006 at the University of Alabama after the dismissal of Mike Shula.

== Early life ==
Kines was born on July 13, 1944, in a train car that was en route from Cedartown, Georgia, to Piedmont, Alabama. He holds both bachelor's and master's degree's from Jacksonville State University. Kines is married to the former Rubye Bell and they had one daughter, Susan Kines Langston, who was killed in a car crash on June 28, 2010, and two grandsons that survived the crash.

== Coaching career ==
Kines began his coaching career at his alma mater, where he served as assistant coach and defensive coordinator through the 1976 season. In 1977, he received an offer to coach linebackers at Clemson University, where he coached for the next two seasons. In 1979, Kines became linebackers coach at the University of Florida under Charley Pell. There he spent two years as the linebackers coach, and was promoted to defensive coordinator in 1981. In 1985 and 1986, Kines was the defensive coordinator and inside linebackers coach at the University of Alabama before leaving with Ray Perkins to the NFL's Tampa Bay Buccaneers. He served as the Buccaneers' linebacker coach from 1987 to 1990. Kines returned to college coaching in 1991 as the defensive coordinator at the University of Arkansas and was promoted to interim head coach of the Razorbacks in 1992 when Jack Crowe was fired following a season-opening loss to The Citadel. He guided the Razorbacks to a 45–7 victory over South Carolina in his first game after taking over for Crowe, and closed the season with a 30–6 rout of arch-rival LSU in the first game between the schools since the Cotton Bowl Classic following the 1965 season.

Kines was Arkansas' assistant head coach and defensive coordinator from 1993 to 1994 under Danny Ford before moving on to the University of Georgia, where he served as the Bulldogs' defensive coordinator from 1995 to 1998 and as assistant head coach in 1999. He also coached the defensive ends while at Georgia. In 2000, Kines left Georgia to become linebackers coach at Florida State University under head coach Bobby Bowden.

Kines returned as defensive coordinator at the University of Alabama in 2003 and remained in that position until head coach Mike Shula was fired on November 27, 2006. In 2005, he was named a finalist for the Broyles Award, given annually to the nation's top college football assistant coach. Kines was named interim head coach and guided Alabama in the Independence Bowl where they lost to Oklahoma State, 34–31. New Alabama head coach Nick Saban did not retain any of Shula's staff; however, Kines was hired as an officer with Tide Pride, which is responsible for helping to fund scholarships, generating revenue for capital improvements, and supporting the "Million Dollar Band", among other activities.

On February 13, 2008, Texas A&M head coach Mike Sherman hired Kines to be his defensive coordinator and assistant head coach. Kines initially did not show interest to the position, but after he exchanged words with Sherman in an interview, he accepted. Kines has called the Aggie defensive squad "awful, and that's being real polite" in the 2008 preseason. Aggie safeties coach Van Malone praised him as being a great communicator: "He's one of the greatest communicators I've ever been around, and if you can communicate with them, that's all these kids want. He won't say a cuss word, but when you're not doing it the way he wants it, you feel like you've been cursed out." Kines retired at the conclusion of the Aggies' 2009 season.

== Head coaching record ==
Year	Team	Overall	Conference	Standing	Bowl/playoffs
Arkansas Razorbacks (Southeastern Conference) (1992)
1992	Arkansas	3–6–1*	3–4–1	4th (Western)	
Arkansas:		3–6–1	3–4–1	*Jack Crowe coached the first game of the season.	
Alabama Crimson Tide (Southeastern Conference) (2006)
2006	Alabama	0–1**			L Independence
Alabama:		0–1		**Mike Shula coached the first 12 games of the season.	
Total:		3–7–1			
