= Mike Shula =

American football player and coach (born 1965)

Minnesota Golden Gophers
- Title: Senior offensive assistant

Personal information
- Born: June 3, 1965 (age 61); Baltimore, Maryland, U.S.
- Listed height: 6 ft 2 in (1.88 m)
- Listed weight: 200 lb (91 kg)

Career information
- Position: Quarterback
- High school: Christopher Columbus (Miami, Florida)
- College: Alabama
- NFL draft: 1987: 12th round, 313th overall pick

Career history

Playing
- Tampa Bay Buccaneers (1987)

Coaching
- Tampa Bay Buccaneers (1988–1990) Offensive assistant; Miami Dolphins (1991–1992) Coaches' assistant; Chicago Bears (1993–1995) Tight ends coach; Tampa Bay Buccaneers (1996–1999) Offensive coordinator; Miami Dolphins (2000–2002) Quarterbacks coach; Alabama (2003–2006) Head coach; Jacksonville Jaguars (2007–2010) Quarterbacks coach; Carolina Panthers (2011–2017); Quarterbacks coach (2011–2012); Offensive coordinator (2013–2017); New York Giants (2018–2019) Offensive coordinator & quarterbacks coach; Denver Broncos (2020–2021) Quarterbacks coach; Buffalo Bills (2022–2023) Senior offensive assistant; South Carolina (2024–2025); Senior offensive assistant (2024–2025); Offensive coordinator & quarterbacks coach (2025); Minnesota (2026–present) Senior offensive assistant

Awards and highlights
- First-team All-SEC (1985)

Head coaching record
- Career: NCAA: 10–23 (.303)
- Coaching profile at Pro Football Reference

Michael John Shula (born June 3, 1965) is an American football coach and former quarterback who is currently a senior offensive assistant for the Minnesota Golden Gophers. He played college football for the Alabama Crimson Tide and was the school's head coach from 2003 to 2006. He was the offensive coordinator for the Tampa Bay Buccaneers from 1996 to 1999, the Carolina Panthers from 2013 to 2017, the New York Giants from 2018 to 2019, and for South Carolina in 2025.

== Early life ==
Shula was born in Baltimore, Maryland, on June 3, 1965. He is the son of Don Shula, the NFL's all-time winningest coach, and the younger brother of Dave Shula. Shula attended high school at Christopher Columbus High School, in Miami, Florida, where he won all-state honors and led his team to the state championship game in December 1982, where they lost to a powerful Pensacola Woodham High team that finished ranked number two in the nation. He enrolled at the University of Alabama, where he started at quarterback for three seasons and graduated with a degree in labor relations in 1989.

== Playing career ==
Shula's football career started with the Crimson Tide, where he was the starting quarterback from 1984 to 1986. The team's record during these three seasons was 24–11–1 (.681), with wins in the Aloha Bowl and the Sun Bowl, plus key victories over USC, Ohio State and Notre Dame. Despite a lack of overwhelming athletic ability or a particularly strong arm, Shula was known for his gutsy performances in big games. He engineered last-minute comebacks against rival Auburn in the 1985 Iron Bowl, and Georgia.

Pre-draft measurables
Height	Weight	40-yard dash	10-yard split	20-yard split	20-yard shuttle	Vertical jump	Broad jump	Bench press
6 ft 2 in (1.88 m)	201 lb (91 kg)	5.13 s	1.78 s	2.95 s	4.49 s	26.5 in (0.67 m)	8 ft 3 in (2.51 m)	2 reps
All values from NFL Combine

After graduating from Alabama, Shula was selected in the 12 round as the 313th overall pick of the 1987 NFL draft by the Tampa Bay Buccaneers, but he saw little playing time in 1987, his only season in the NFL.

== Coaching career ==
=== Early career ===
Shula has served in assistant coaching positions in the NFL, twice with the Miami Dolphins plus stints with the Chicago Bears and the Buccaneers, where he was offensive coordinator from 1996 to 1999. As offensive coordinator under Tony Dungy with the Tampa Bay Buccaneers, the team enjoyed success and narrowly missed the Super Bowl after losing the NFC Championship Game against eventual Super Bowl champion St. Louis Rams. Following that 1999 NFC Championship Game, he was fired as offensive coordinator after the Bucs finished no higher than 22nd in total offense during his tenure. After his firing from Tampa, Shula went on to be the quarterbacks coach of the Miami Dolphins from 2000 to 2002, then left to become the head coach of the University of Alabama football team.

=== Alabama ===
==== 2003 ====
Shula was hired as head coach at Alabama in May 2003 after the termination of Mike Price. At the time of his arrival, the program was in great turmoil despite a 10–3 record the previous year. In that year, the program had been hammered by NCAA sanctions, lost Dennis Franchione to Texas A&M, and subsequently fired Price due to his off-field actions. At the time, he was the second-youngest coach in all of Division I-A football, at age 38. He was hired on a six-year, $5.4 million contract.

With the loss of several players from the 2002 team, and an offense that was not fully installed due to time constraints, Alabama suffered through a 4–9 season in 2003. The season was marked by close losses and fourth quarter collapses. In games decided by one score or less, Alabama was 0–6 on the season. Alabama lost overtime games to Arkansas and Tennessee, and generally seemed to be close but not close enough to breaking through virtually all season.

==== 2004 ====
The 2004 season got off to a quick start with Alabama quickly moving to 3–0 with blowout wins over Middle Tennessee, Mississippi, and Western Carolina. However, against Western Carolina, star quarterback Brodie Croyle tore his right ACL on a pass attempt, ending his season. The injury effectively marked the beginning of the end for the 2004 season. The offense sputtered the rest of the way while suffering even more injuries to several other key players. Starting tailback Ray Hudson suffered a season ending knee injury three weeks later against Kentucky, and starting fullback Tim Castille also suffered a season ending knee injury the following week in the fourth quarter against Tennessee. Backup quarterback Marc Guillon and backup tailback Kenneth Darby were also sidelined due to injuries. Alabama hobbled down the stretch to finish the year 6–6. By the time of the Iron Bowl, the Crimson Tide had a third-string quarterback, with a fourth-string tailback, two true freshman wide receivers, and a true freshman tight end. The season was, like the year before, marred by close losses. Shula did, however, lead Alabama to its first bowl game since the 2001 season, with a berth in the 2004 Music City Bowl against the Minnesota Golden Gophers. Alabama lost the game after the third-string quarterback Spencer Pennington sailed a pass over the head of Tyrone Prothro, who was open in the back of the endzone, and failed to convert on a 4th-and-5.

==== 2005 ====
The 2005 season would see fortunes turn around for Shula and his Alabama team. Despite a catastrophic leg injury suffered by star wide receiver Tyrone Prothro, Alabama went 10–2 with a victory in the 2006 Cotton Bowl Classic over the Mike Leach-led Texas Tech Red Raiders. The season included blowout wins over Florida and South Carolina, and also included a 6–3 win in a defensive classic over rival Tennessee. Alabama was ranked third in the nation and in the National Championship chase before losing at home in overtime to LSU and getting blown out by archrival Auburn on the road. The relative success gave Shula his first 10–win season in just his third year as head coach and also extended Alabama's lead in respect to having the most 10–win seasons of any program in the nation. Furthermore, the Cotton Bowl Classic appearance and victory extended Alabama's lead in playing in, and winning, more bowl games than any other major school. The Tide finished the season ranked eighth in the nation.

Following the season, the university gave Shula a contract extension—6 years, $1.8 million per year.

==== 2006 ====
Although few expected Alabama to win 10 games again in 2006, expectations generally still called for a solid eight or nine win season. The Tide jumped out of the gate playing well, moving to 3–0 on the heels of clutch kicking and the solid quarterback play of John Parker Wilson. The team suffered two consecutive losses to the Arkansas Razorbacks and, the eventual national champion, Florida Gators. The Tide struggled the rest of the year, as the offense could not consistently move the ball once inside the red zone, and the defense played below previous standards. The Tide lost to long time rival Tennessee after leading for over fifty minutes. Alabama ended the season by losing their final three games to Mississippi State at home, LSU, and their fifth consecutive Iron Bowl loss to in state rival Auburn, ending with a 6–6 record. On November 26, one week after the Iron Bowl loss, Alabama athletic director Mal Moore notified Mike Shula that he would not be retained as the University of Alabama's head football coach for the 2007 season. The University of Alabama had to pay Shula $4 million left on his contract after they fired him.

=== Jacksonville Jaguars ===
On January 16, 2007, the Miami Herald reported that Shula was a candidate to become the next head coach of the Miami Dolphins. At that point he'd already had two interviews for the job. If the job had gone to Shula, he would have obtained the job Nick Saban—the coach who took over at Alabama—had vacated. However, on January 19, 2007, the Miami Dolphins announced that Cam Cameron, then offensive coordinator of the San Diego Chargers, had been appointed to the job.

On January 25, 2007, the Jacksonville Jaguars named Shula their quarterbacks coach. He oversaw quarterback David Garrard’s development from becoming a full-time starter in 2007 to making the Pro Bowl in 2009. In Shula's first year with the Jaguars, Garrard ranked third in the NFL with a 102.2 passer rating – an almost 23-point improvement from the previous season – threw an NFL-low three interceptions and established a team record with a 64.0 completion percentage.

=== Carolina Panthers ===
On January 21, 2011, the Carolina Panthers named Shula as their quarterbacks coach. In 2011, he helped quarterback Cam Newton earn Associated Press Offensive Rookie of the Year after turning in one of the most prolific rookie seasons in NFL history, passing for 4,051 yards and accounting for 35 total touchdowns. In 2012, under Shula's tutelage, Newton improved on his Rookie-of-the-Year quarterback rating from 2011 with an 86.2 mark while rushing for more than 700 yards for a second straight season. Newton's 7,920 passing yards in the 2011/12 seasons surpassed the previous mark for a player's first two seasons held by Peyton Manning.

On January 18, 2013, the Panthers named Shula their offensive coordinator replacing Rob Chudzinski, who had been hired as the Cleveland Browns' head coach. Shula was named Offensive Coordinator of the Year by Pro Football Focus during the 2015 NFL season.

In the 2015 season, Newton won the NFL MVP award, and the Panthers reached Super Bowl 50 on February 7, 2016. The Panthers fell to the Denver Broncos by a score of 24–10.

On January 9, 2018, following the Panthers' wild-card playoff loss to the New Orleans Saints, he was released by the Panthers.

=== New York Giants ===
On February 13, 2018, Shula was hired by the New York Giants as quarterbacks coach and offensive coordinator.

=== Denver Broncos ===
On January 28, 2020, Shula was hired by the Denver Broncos as quarterbacks coach and working again with offensive coordinator Pat Shurmur.

=== Buffalo Bills ===
On March 15, 2022, Shula was hired by Buffalo Bills as senior offensive assistant.

On March 6, 2024, Shula was not retained by the Buffalo Bills.

=== South Carolina ===
On March 20, 2024, Shula was hired by South Carolina as an offensive analyst, and was promoted on December 17, 2024 to offensive coordinator following Appalachian State's hiring of Dowell Loggains as head coach. On November 2, 2025, Shula was fired following a 3–6 start and the offense failing to surpass 350 total yards in any of their games.

== Personal life ==
Shula is Catholic and has three children with his wife Shari.

== Head coaching record ==
Year	Team	Overall	Conference	Standing	Bowl/playoffs	Coaches^{#}	AP^{°}
Alabama Crimson Tide (Southeastern Conference) (2003–2006)
2003	Alabama	4–9	2–6	5th (Western)			
2004	Alabama	6–6	3–5	3rd (Western)	L Music City		
2005	Alabama	0–2* (10–2)‡	0–2* (6–2)‡	3rd (Western)	W Cotton	8	8
2006	Alabama	0–6* (6–6) ‡	0–6* (2–6) ‡	4th (Western)	Independence		
Alabama:		10–23* (26–23) ‡	5–19* (13–19) ‡	*Independence Bowl coached by Joe Kines			
Total:		10–23* (26–23) ‡					
^{#}Rankings from final Coaches Poll.; ^{°}Rankings from final AP Poll.; ‡ The NCAA ruled that Alabama must vacate 21 victories (16 during Shula's tenure) due to sanctions stemming from textbook-related infractions. Alabama's official record was 0–2 (0–2 SEC) in 2005 and 0–6 (0–6 SEC) in 2006. Shula's official record at Alabama was 10–23 (5–19 SEC).
