= 1987 Los Angeles Raiders season =

NFL team season

- Owner: Al Davis
- General manager: Al Davis
- Head coach: Tom Flores
- Home stadium: L.A. Memorial Coliseum

Results
- Record: 5–10
- Division place: 4th AFC West
- Playoffs: Did not qualify

The 1987 Los Angeles Raiders season was the franchise's strike-shortened 28th season overall, and the franchise's 18th season in the National Football League. The Raiders finished with a disappointing record of 5–10, the team's worst finish since Al Davis arrived in 1963 and only the sixth losing season in franchise history.

== Offseason ==
=== NFL draft ===
Since he did not sign with a team by the 1987 draft, Bo Jackson's rights were forfeited by Tampa Bay and his name was thrown back into the draft. The Raiders selected Jackson in the seventh round with the 183rd overall pick. Raiders owner Al Davis supported Jackson and his baseball career and got Jackson to sign a contract by offering him a salary that was comparable to a full-time starting running back but allowing Jackson to only play part-time until the baseball season was done.

1987 Los Angeles Raiders draft
Round	Pick	Player	Position	College	Notes
1	15	John Clay	Offensive tackle	Missouri	
2	52	Bruce Wilkerson	Offensive tackle	Tennessee	
3	81	Steve Smith	Running back	Penn State	
4	110	Steve Beuerlein	Quarterback	Notre Dame	
9	238	Scott Eccles	Tight end	Eastern New Mexico	
10	254	Rob Harrison	Defensive back	Sacramento State	
10	265	John Gesek	Guard	Sacramento State	
10	273	Jim Ellis	Linebacker	Boise State	
11	288	Chris McLemore	Running back	Arizona	
11	294	Mario Perry	Tight end	Mississippi	
Made roster * Made at least one Pro Bowl during career

== Personnel ==
=== Staff ===
1987 Los Angeles Raiders staff
Front office: President of the general partner – Al Davis; Executive assistant – Al LoCasale; Personnel operations – Ron Wolf; Senior executive – John Herrera; Head coaches: Head coach – Tom Flores; Offensive coaches: Quarterbacks – Larry Kennan; Offensive backs – Joe Scannella; Receivers – Tom Walsh; Tight ends – Bob Mischak; Offensive line – Sam Boghosian; Offensive line – Art Shell; Coaches assistant – Terry Robiskie	Defensive coaches: Defensive line – Earl Leggett; Linebackers – Sam Gruneisen; Linebackers – Charlie Sumner; Defensive backs – Willie Brown; Defensive backs – Jimmy Warren; Special teams coaches: Special teams – Ray Willsey

=== NFL replacement players ===
After the league decided to use replacement players during the NFLPA strike, the following team was assembled:

1987 Los Angeles Raiders replacement roster
Quarterbacks: 6 Marc Wilson; 10 Mark Van Allen; 11 Vince Evans; 17 Scott Woolf; Running backs: 21 Rick Calhoun; 23 Ethan Horton; 28 Rob Harrison; 31 Craig Ellis; 36 Thurman Beard; 39 Steve Strachan; 45 Vic Stagliano; 47 Jim Browne; 48 Shawn Jones; Wide receivers: 19 David Williams; 81 Greg Lathan; 82 Luis McDonald; 83 Carl Aikens; 86 Mervyn Fernandez; 86 Mike Simmons; 87 Wade Lockett; 88 Stanley Blalock; 89 Greg Holder; Tight ends: 80 Jack Owens; 82 Ron Wheeler; 84 Mario Perry; 85 Ricky Ellis	Offensive linemen: 54 Paul Dufault; 61 John Tautolo; 62 Shawn Regent; 63 David Pyles; 64 Andy Dickerson; 67 Barry Black; 69 Jon Zogg; Defensive linemen: 60 Rick Ackerman; 70 Ed Washington; 71 Bill Pickel; 72 Rod Timmons; 73 John Hynes; 74 Mike Rodriguez; 76 Mike Miller; 77 Ted Chapman; 79 Brian Belway; 93 Greg Townsend; 94 Rick Goltz; 95 Bob Buczkowski; 95 Tom Weaver; 97 Phil Grimes	Linebackers: 50 Darryl Byrd; 51 Keith Williams; 53 Mike Noble; 57 Jerry Robinson; 58 Jim Ellis; 59 Ricky Logan; 90 Darryl Goodlow; 91 Leonard Jackson; 91 Ronnie Washington; 92 Dan McMillen; 95 Joe Cormier; 96 Ron Brown; Defensive backs: 20 Chetti Carr; 20 Willie Teal; 23 Rod Hill; 24 Lance Harkey; 25 Ricky Williams; 29 Tony Tillmon; 33 Demise Williams; 34 D'Shaun Shamburger; 35 Eddie Anderson; 35 Michael Grayson; 38 Steve Johnson; 40 Jo Jo Heath; 41 Ron Foster; 42 Kenny Danforth; 49 Victor Jackson; Special teams: 3 Vincent Gamache P; 4 David Hardy K; 8 Jim Corrazzini K; 9 James Fohey P; 10 Chris Bahr K

=== Roster ===
1987 Los Angeles Raiders roster
Quarterbacks (QB): 11 Vince Evans; 12 Rusty Hilger; 6 Marc Wilson; Running backs (RB): 32 Marcus Allen; 34 Bo Jackson FB; 40 Zeph Lee; 42 Vance Mueller; 39 Steve Strachan; Wide receivers (WR): 84 Jessie Hester; 80 James Lofton; 85 Dokie Williams; 88 Chris Woods; Tight ends (TE): 82 Gene Branton; 46 Todd Christensen; 87 Trey Junkin; 81 Andy Parker	Offensive linemen (OL): 78 John Clay T; 63 John Gesek C; 76 Brian Holloway T; 51 Bill Lewis G; 65 Mickey Marvin G; 64 Dean Miraldi G; 72 Don Mosebar C; 63 Dwight Wheeler T/G; 68 Bruce Wilkerson G; Defensive linemen (DL): 95 Bob Buczkowski DE; 99 Sean Jones DE; 75 Howie Long DE; 71 Bill Pickel NT; 96 Malcolm Taylor NT; 93 Greg Townsend DE; 98 Mitch Willis NT; 90 Mike Wise DE	Linebackers (LB): 59 Jamie Kimmel ILB; 52 Linden King OLB; 53 Rod Martin OLB; 54 Reggie McKenzie ILB; 55 Matt Millen ILB; 57 Jerry Robinson ILB; Defensive backs (DB): 44 Stefon Adams SS; 33 Eddie Anderson FS; 45 James Davis CB; 21 Ron Fellows CB; 22 Mike Haynes CB; 38 Rod Hill CB; 26 Vann McElroy FS; 43 Sam Seale CB; 30 Stacey Toran SS; 48 Lionel Washington CB; Special teams (ST): 10 Chris Bahr K; 5 Stan Talley P	Reserve: 56 Jeff Barnes LB (IR); 7 Steve Beuerlein QB (IR); 77 Ted Chapman DE (IR); -- Joe Cormier LB (IR); 86 Mervyn Fernandez WR (IR); 73 Charley Hannah G (IR); 28 Rob Harrison RB (IR); 27 Frank Hawkins RB (IR); 37 Lester Hayes CB (IR); 49 Brian Hutson S (IR); 74 Shelby Jordan T (IR); 31 Napoleon McCallum RB (Military); 20 Chris McLemore RB (IR); 16 Jim Plunkett QB (IR); 77 Chris Riehm G (IR); 35 Steve Smith FB (IR); 66 Steve Wright T (IR); Rookies in italics

== Regular season ==
Joining the Raiders midway through the 1987 season, Bo Jackson rushed for 554 yards on 81 carries in just seven games. Over the next three seasons, Bo Jackson would rush for 2,228 more yards and 12 touchdowns: a remarkable achievement, in light of the fact that he was a "second string" player behind Raiders legend Marcus Allen.

Jackson turned in a 221-yard rushing performance on Monday Night Football in 1987 against the Seattle Seahawks. During this game, he ran over Seahawks linebacker Brian Bosworth, who had insulted Jackson and promised in a media event before the game to contain Jackson. He also made a 91-yard run to the outside, untouched down the sideline. He continued sprinting until finally slowing down as he passed through the entrance to the field tunnel to the dressing rooms with teammates soon following. Jackson scored two rushing touchdowns and one receiving touchdown in the game.

=== Schedule ===
Week	Date	Opponent	Result	Record	Venue	Attendance	Recap
1	September 13	at Green Bay Packers	**W** 20–0	1–0	Lambeau Field	54,983	Recap
2	September 20	Detroit Lions	**W** 27–7	2–0	Los Angeles Memorial Coliseum	50,300	Recap
–	September 27	at Houston Oilers	Canceled	2–0	Houston Astrodome		
3	October 4	**Kansas City Chiefs**	**W** 35–17	3–0	Los Angeles Memorial Coliseum	10,708	Recap
4	October 12	at **Denver Broncos**	**L** 14–30	3–1	Mile High Stadium	61,230	Recap
5	October 18	**San Diego Chargers**	**L** 17–23	3–2	Los Angeles Memorial Coliseum	23,541	Recap
6	October 25	**Seattle Seahawks**	**L** 13–35	3–3	Los Angeles Memorial Coliseum	52,735	Recap
7	November 1	at New England Patriots	**L** 23–26	3–4	Sullivan Stadium	60,664	Recap
8	November 8	at Minnesota Vikings	**L** 20–31	3–5	Hubert H. Humphrey Metrodome	57,150	Recap
9	November 15	at **San Diego Chargers**	**L** 14–16	3–6	Jack Murphy Stadium	60,639	Recap
10	November 22	**Denver Broncos**	**L** 17–23	3–7	Los Angeles Memorial Coliseum	61,318	Recap
11	November 30	at **Seattle Seahawks**	**W** 37–14	4–7	Kingdome	62,802	Recap
12	December 6	Buffalo Bills	**W** 34–21	5–7	Los Angeles Memorial Coliseum	43,143	Recap
13	December 13	at **Kansas City Chiefs**	**L** 10–16	5–8	Arrowhead Stadium	63,834	Recap
14	December 20	Cleveland Browns	**L** 17–24	5–9	Los Angeles Memorial Coliseum	40,275	Recap
15	December 27	Chicago Bears	**L** 3–6	5–10	Los Angeles Memorial Coliseum	78,019	Recap
Note: Intra-division opponents are in **bold** text.

=== Game summaries ===
==== Week 1 ====
Team	1	2	3	4	Total
• Raiders	0	7	7	6	20
Packers	0	0	0	0	0

- Date: September 13
- Location: Lambeau Field, Green Bay, WI
- Game start: 4:00 p.m.
- Game weather: 56 °F (13.3 °C); wind 9 miles per hour (14 km/h; 7.8 kn)

Scoring summary
Q2	LA	Allen 1 yard run (Bahr kick)	LA 7–0
Q3	LA	McElory 35 yard interception return (Bahr kick)	LA 14–0
Q4	LA	Bahr 40 yard field goal	LA 17–0
Q4	LA	Bahr 27 yard field goal	LA 20–0

- Marcus Allen 33 Rush, 136 Yds

==== Week 9 at Minnesota Vikings ====
External videos
- 1987 Los Angeles Raiders at Minnesota Vikings – Game highlights

==== Week 11 ====
Team	1	2	3	4	Total
• Raiders	7	20	10	0	37
Seahawks	7	0	7	0	14

- Date: November 30
- Location: Kingdome, Seattle, Washington
- Game start: 9:00 p.m. EST
- Game attendance: 62,802
- Game weather: indoors (dome)
- TV announcers (ABC): Al Michaels, Frank Gifford, and Dan Dierdorf

Scoring summary
1	SEA	Daryl Turner 19 yard pass from Dave Krieg (Norm Johnson kick)	SEA 7–0
1	LA	James Lofton 46 yard pass from Marc Wilson (Chris Bahr kick)	Tie 7–7
2	LA	Bo Jackson 14 yard pass from Marc Wilson (Chris Bahr kick)	LA 14–7
2	LA	Bo Jackson 91 yard run (Chris Bahr kick)	LA 21–7
2	LA	Chris Bahr 23 yard field goal	LA 24–7
2	LA	Chris Bahr 47 yard field goal	LA 27–7
3	LA	Bo Jackson 2 yard run (Chris Bahr kick)	LA 34–7
3	LA	Chris Bahr 23 yard field goal	LA 37–7
3	SEA	Mike Tice 3 yard pass from Dave Krieg (Norm Johnson kick)	LA 37–14

=== Standings ===
AFC West
	W	L	T	PCT	DIV	CONF	PF	PA	STK
Denver Broncos^{(1)}	10	4	1	.700	7–1	8–3	379	288	W2
Seattle Seahawks^{(5)}	9	6	0	.600	4–3	5–6	371	314	L1
San Diego Chargers	8	7	0	.533	3–4	6–7	253	317	L6
Los Angeles Raiders	5	10	0	.333	2–6	3–8	301	289	L3
Kansas City Chiefs	4	11	0	.267	3–5	3–9	273	388	W1

== Awards and records ==
- Howie Long, AFC Pro Bowl selection
