= 1986 Kentucky Wildcats football team =

American college football season

1986 Kentucky Wildcats football
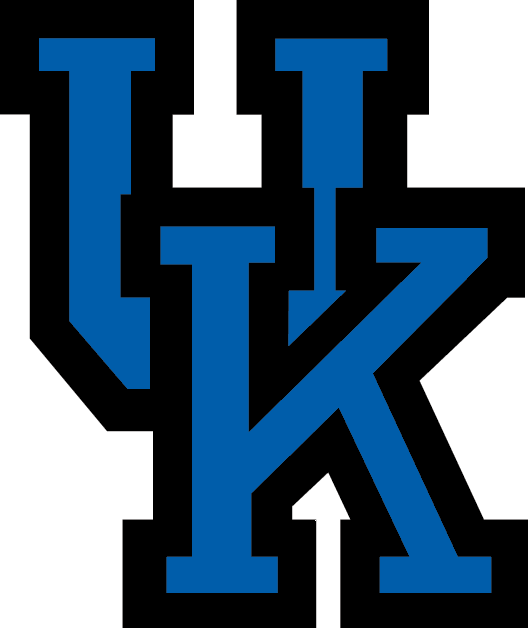
- Conference: Southeastern Conference
- Record: 5–5–1 (2–4 SEC)
- Head coach: Jerry Claiborne (5th season)
- Home stadium: Commonwealth Stadium

1986 Southeastern Conference football standings
	Conf.					Overall
Team	W		L		T	W		L		T
No. 10 LSU $	5	–	1	–	0	9	–	3	–	0
No. 6 Auburn	4	–	2	–	0	10	–	2	–	0
No. 9 Alabama	4	–	2	–	0	10	–	3	–	0
Georgia	4	–	2	–	0	8	–	4	–	0
Ole Miss	4	–	2	–	0	8	–	3	–	1
Tennessee	3	–	3	–	0	7	–	5	–	0
Mississippi State	2	–	4	–	0	6	–	5	–	0
Kentucky	2	–	4	–	0	5	–	5	–	1
Florida	2	–	4	–	0	6	–	5	–	0
Vanderbilt	0	–	6	–	0	1	–	10	–	0
$ – Conference champion; Rankings from AP Poll

The 1986 Kentucky Wildcats football team represented the University of Kentucky in the Southeastern Conference (SEC) during the 1986 NCAA Division I-A football season. In their fifth season under head coach Jerry Claiborne, the Wildcats compiled a 5–5–1 record (2–4 against SEC opponents), finished in a tie for seventh place in the SEC, and outscored their opponents, 228 to 206. The team played its home games in Commonwealth Stadium in Lexington, Kentucky.

The team's statistical leaders included Bill Ransdell with 1,610 passing yards, Ivy Joe Hunter with 621 rushing yards, and Cornell Burbage with 331 receiving yards. This season was the last time Kentucky defeated Florida until 2018 and the last win over Florida at home until 2021.

== Schedule ==
Date	Opponent	Site	Result	Attendance	Source
September 13	Rutgers*	Commonwealth Stadium; Lexington, KY	T 16–16	57,424	
September 20	Kent State*	Commonwealth Stadium; Lexington, KY	W 37–12	54,865	
September 27	at Cincinnati*	Riverfront Stadium; Cincinnati, OH	W 37–20	36,233	
October 4	Southern Miss*	Commonwealth Stadium; Lexington, KY	W 32–0	58,102	
October 11	at Ole Miss	Mississippi Veterans Memorial Stadium; Jackson, MS	L 13–33	28,000	
October 18	No. 12 LSU	Commonwealth Stadium; Lexington, KY	L 16–25	57,201	
October 25	Georgia	Commonwealth Stadium; Lexington, KY	L 9–31	56,820	
November 1	at Virginia Tech*	Lane Stadium; Blacksburg, VA	L 15–17	30,300	
November 8	Vanderbilt	Commonwealth Stadium; Lexington, KY (rivalry)	W 34–22	48,230	
November 15	Florida	Commonwealth Stadium; Lexington, KY (rivalry)	W 10–3	52,160	
November 22	at Tennessee	Neyland Stadium; Knoxville, TN (rivalry)	L 9–28	90,747	
*Non-conference game; Rankings from Coaches' Poll released prior to the game

== Roster ==
1986 Kentucky Wildcats football team roster
Players
Coaches
Offense

Pos.	#	Name	Class
QB	12	Bill Allen	So
WR	4	Cornell Burbage	Sr
G	57	Dermontti Dawson	Jr
WR	82	Greg Doll	Jr
C	61	Ken Lange	Sr
RB	22	Mark Higgs	Jr
RB	32	Ivy Joe Hunter	So
FB	25	Marc Logan	Sr
TE		Matt Lucas	Sr
FB	43	Mack Major	Jr
DB	3	Tony Mayes	Sr
G	61	Tony Mills	So
FB	35	Andy Murray	Fr
G	71	Brad Myers	Jr
OT	78	Tony Nash	So
WR	21	Jimmie O'Neal	Jr
TE	87	Martin Pennington	So
OT	75	Mike Pfeifer	So
WR	83	Eric Pitts	Sr
QB	9	Bill Ransdell III	Sr
OT	72	Sam Rotella	Sr
WR	32	Bill Shehan	So
WR	19	Dee Smith	Fr
OT	62	Mel Skinner	So
QB	13	Tim Smith	Jr
OT	62	Walter Smith	So
C	58	Gardner Sorrell	Fr
G	64	Joe David Turner	Jr
G	75	Russell Viel	Fr
G	52	Harry Walter	So
G	73	George Wilburn	Jr

Defense

Pos.	#	Name	Class
S	37	Todd Allgeier	Jr
DT	79	Oliver Barnett	Fr
LB	58	Mike Cahill	Jr
DT	70	Tom Howard	Jr
CB	24	D. J. Johnson	So
DB	3	Tony Mayes	Sr
DT	54	Jerry Reese	Jr
DT	91	John Shannon	Jr
LB	40	Larry Smith	Sr
DB	27	Tom Smith	Sr
DG	97	Scott Stubbs	Jr
LB	39	Don Yarano	Sr
DT	94	Mike Velotta	Sr
DT	74	Tom Wilkins	Sr
DB	20	Steve Wroble	Jr

Special teams

Pos.	#	Name	Class
P	1	Jeff Nelson	So
P	16	Jay Tesar	So
PK	15	Joseph Worley	Jr

Head coach

- Jerry Claiborne

Coordinators/assistant coaches

- Jerry Eisaman – Quarterbacks coach
- Pat Etcheberry – Strength coach
- Chip Garber – Defensive backs coach
- Bill Glazer – Defensive guards coach
- Jake Hallum – Offensive line coach
- Dave Likins – Defensive ends coach
- Greg Nord – Offensive backs coach
- Dick Redding – Administrative Assistant
- Rod Sharpless – Defensive tackles coach
- Farrell Sheridan – Offensive line coach
- Terry Strock – Linebackers coach

Legend

- (C) Team captain
- (S) Suspended
- (I) Ineligible
- Injured
- Redshirt
