= Clete Blakeman =

American football official (born 1964)

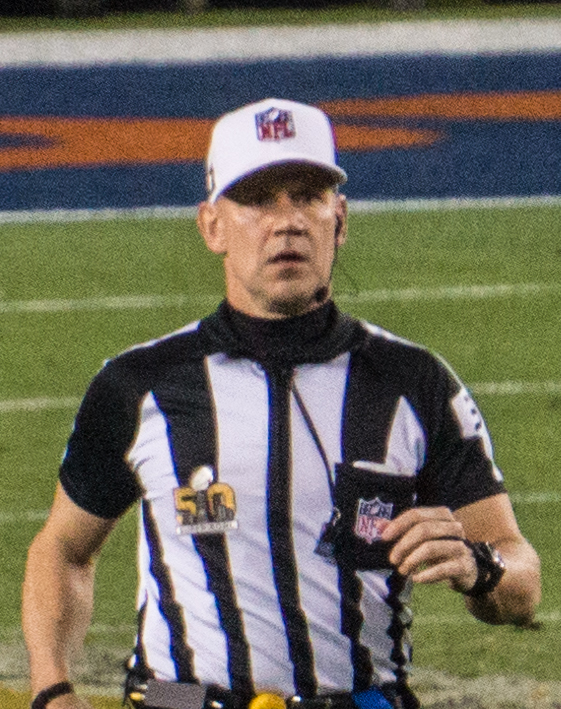
- Blakeman at Super Bowl 50
- Born: Cletus W. Blakeman; June 23, 1964 (age 61); Blair, Nebraska, U.S.
- Education: University of Nebraska–Lincoln
- Occupations: NFL official, attorney

Cletus W. Blakeman (born June 23, 1964) is an American professional football official in the National Football League (NFL). His uniform number is 34. He played college football at the University of Nebraska–Lincoln. Outside of his work as an NFL official, he is a partner and personal injury attorney in the law firm of Carlson Blakeman LLP in Omaha, Nebraska.

Blakeman began his American football officiating career in the Big 12 Conference, moving to the NFL in 2008 as a field judge for the first two seasons of his pro football officiating career, and subsequently refereeing for the 2010 NFL season, after Don Carey returned to the back judge position.

Selected in 2013 as the alternate referee for Super Bowl XLVIII, Blakeman officiated Super Bowl 50 in 2016.

== College football career ==
Blakeman attended the University of Nebraska–Lincoln from 1984 to 1987, serving primarily as a backup quarterback for the Nebraska Cornhuskers, including the 1986 and 1987 seasons behind starter Steve Taylor.

During Nebraska's game against the unranked Colorado Buffaloes on October 25, 1986, head coach Tom Osborne replaced Taylor with Blakeman in the fourth quarter. Colorado still limited Blakeman to 4 out of 6 completions for 37 yards, and held on to upset the Huskers, 20–10, their first win over Nebraska since 1967 and the Buffaloes' first win over Nebraska at home since 1960.

Blakeman played in the 1987 Sugar Bowl, a 30–15 victory over Southeastern Conference champion LSU.

On October 3, 1987, South Carolina was leading Nebraska, 21–13, when Taylor left the game after injuring his shoulder on the last play of the 3rd quarter. In relief, Blakeman completed his only pass for 8 yards. But aided by a strong running game, and Nebraska's Blackshirts defense that forced two turnovers and allowed only 9 yards in the 4th quarter, the Huskers rallied around Blakeman to score 17 unanswered points to win, 30–21.

Blakeman also started two games in place of an injured Taylor, both of which were victories over the Kansas Jayhawks. On November 15, 1986, he threw three touchdown passes and ran for another as he led Nebraska to a 70–0 rout at Lawrence, the worst defeat in Jayhawk history and the biggest shutout by Nebraska up to that point. On October 10, 1987, Blakeman completed 10-of-12 passes for 100 yards and a touchdown in Nebraska's 54–2 victory at home against Kansas.

=== Statistics ===
	Passing						Rushing			
YEAR	CMP	ATT	CMP%	YDS	TD	INT	ATT	YDS	AVG	TD
1984	0	0	--	--	--	--	8	17	2.1	1
1985	3	5	60.0	22	0	0	15	65	4.3	0
1986	19	37	51.4	242	4	2	26	110	4.2	4
1987	23	37	62.2	361	3	2	27	90	3.3	2
Totals	45	79	57.0	625	7	4	76	282	3.7	7

== Officiating career ==
Blakeman was hired by the NFL for the 2008 season. He served as field judge for the crew led by referee Bill Leavy from 2008 to 2009. Blakeman received a postseason assignment in a 2009 AFC wild card game. He was then promoted to referee for the 2010 season.

Since becoming a referee, Blakeman has been assigned to nine postseason games, which include three conference championship games and Super Bowl 50.

Since 2013, Blakeman's voice and likeness have been used for penalty announcements in the Madden NFL franchise.

=== Officiating crew ===
Blakeman's officiating crew for the 2025 NFL season is as follows:

- R: Clete Blakeman
- U: Scott Campbell
- DJ: Andy Warner
- LJ: Kent Payne
- FJ: Karina Tovar
- SJ: James Coleman
- BJ: Jonah Monroe
- RO: Chad Adams
- RA: Amber Cipriani
