= Shawn Halloran =

American football player (born 1964)

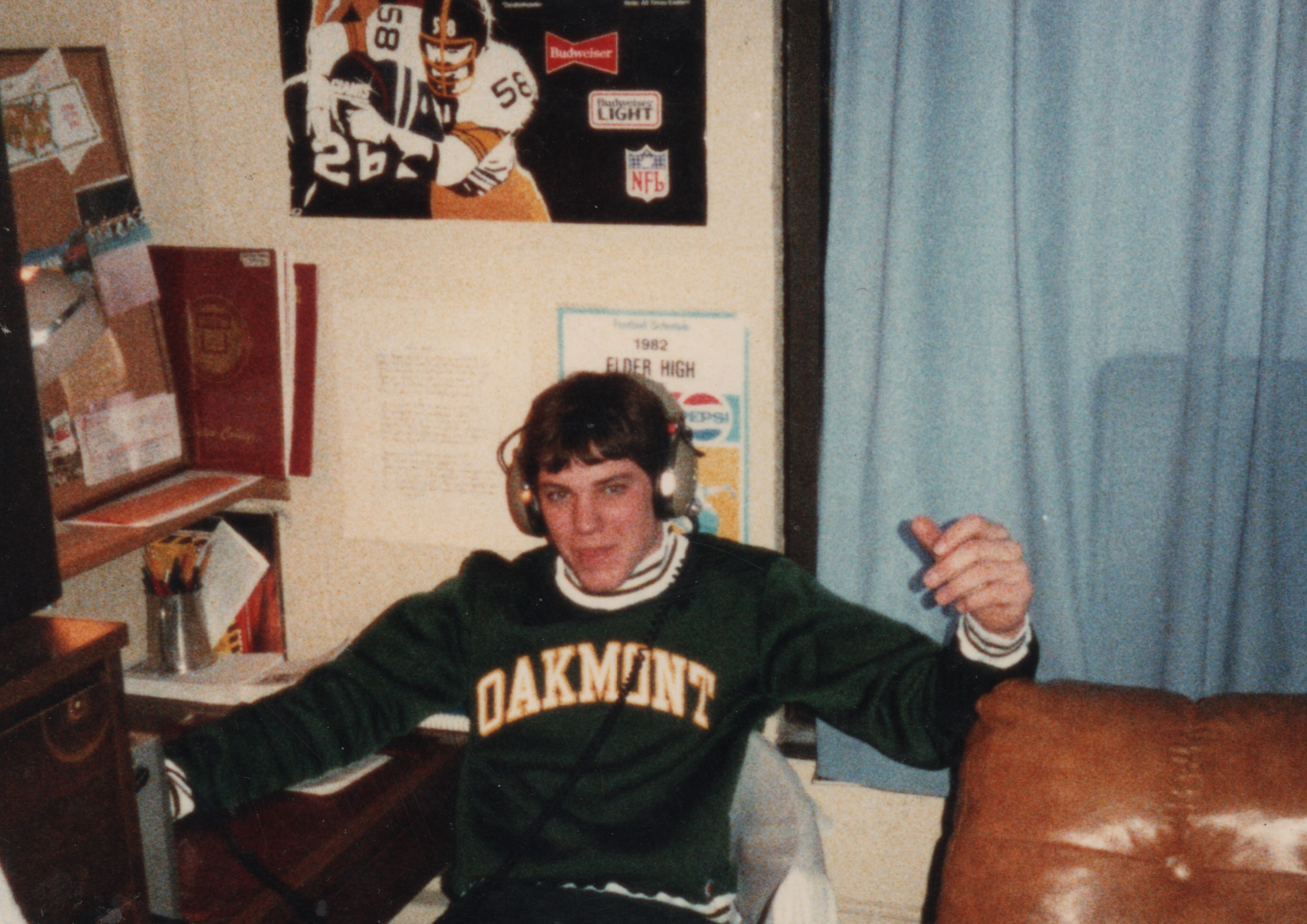
- Halloran in his dorm room in 1982

No. 19
- Position: Quarterback

Personal information
- Born: April 23, 1964 (age 62); Gardner, Massachusetts, U.S.
- Listed height: 6 ft 4 in (1.93 m)
- Listed weight: 217 lb (98 kg)

Career information
- High school: Oakmont Regional (Ashburnham, Massachusetts)
- College: Boston College
- NFL draft: 1987: undrafted

Career history

Playing
- St. Louis Cardinals (1987); Miami Dolphins (1988)*
- * Offseason or practice squad member only

Coaching
- Boston College (1991) Graduate assistant; WPI (1992) Assistant; Georgetown (1993–1996) Offensive coordinator; Yale (1997–2002) Special teams; Franklin & Marshall (2003–2005) Head coach; Penn (2006) Offensive coordinator; Yale (2007–2008) Special teams; North Forest HS (TX) (2009–2010) Head coach; Splendora HS (TX) (2011–2012) Assistant; Conroe HS (TX) (2013–2016) Assistant

Operations
- Bishop Lynch HS (TX) (2017–present) Athletic director

Career NFL statistics
- Passing attempts: 42
- Passing completions: 18
- Completion percentage: 42.9%
- TD–INT: 0–1
- Passing yards: 263
- Passer rating: 54
- Stats at Pro Football Reference

Shawn Halloran (born April 23, 1964) is an American high school sports administrator and former football player and coach. He played college football as a quarterback for the Boston College Eagles and professionally for St. Louis Cardinals of the National Football League (NFL). Halloran served as the head football coach at Franklin & Marshall College from 2003 to 2005, compiling a record of 17–15. He is currently the athletic director at Bishop Lynch High School in Dallas, Texas, a position he has held since 2017.

== Playing career ==
=== Boston College ===
Halloran came to Boston College in 1983 and was the backup quarterback for the Boston College Eagles from 1983 to 1984, playing behind Heisman Trophy winner Doug Flutie. In 1985, his first season as starter, Halloran completed 159 of 258 passes for 2,029 yards and 17 touchdowns. The 1985 Boston College Eagles football team however did poorly, finishing 4–8. In his senior season, Halloran completed 234 of 423 passes for 2,935 yards, setting BC single-season records for pass attempts, completions, and interceptions (23). He led the 1986 Boston College Eagles football team to a 9–3 record and a 27–24 win over the Georgia Bulldogs in the Hall of Fame Bowl, completing a 5-yard game-winning touchdown pass to Kelvin Martin with 32 seconds remaining. The touchdown ended a 76-yard drive that lasted 2 minutes and 6 seconds. Halloran completed 31 of 52 attempts for 316 yards and 2 touchdowns.

=== NFL ===
Pre-draft measurables
Height	Weight	Arm length	Hand span	40-yard dash	10-yard split	20-yard split	20-yard shuttle	Vertical jump	Broad jump	Bench press
6 ft 4 1/4 in (1.94 m)	217 lb (98 kg)	31 1/4 in (0.79 m)	10 1/4 in (0.26 m)	5.14 s	1.80 s	2.94 s	4.53 s	23.5 in (0.60 m)	7 ft 10 in (2.39 m)	10 reps
All values from NFL Combine

Halloran signed with the St. Louis Cardinals of the National Football League (NFL) during the 1987 season. He appeared in 3 games, starting 2 and completing 18 of 42 passes for 263 yards and 1 interception. He was the backup behind Neil Lomax for the remainder of the season and retired from playing in May 1988.

== Coaching career ==
Halloran began his coaching career as a graduate assistant at Boston College in 1991 and was an assistant coach at Worcester Polytechnic Institute (WPI) in 1992. From 1993 to 1996 he was the offensive coordinator at Georgetown University. From 1997 to 2002, Halloran was the special teams coordinator at Yale University. During his tenure the Yale Bulldogs won the Ivy League title in 1999. Halloran coached Yale's all-time leading kicker, punter, and punt returner.

Halloran spent the next three years as the head football coach at Franklin & Marshall College. He finished with a 17–15 record, back-to-back Eastern College Athletic Conference playoff appearances, a share of the Centennial Conference championship in 2004, and one ECAC Southwest Bowl title. Franklin & Marshall advanced to the ECAC Southeast Bowl in 2005.

Halloran he was named offensive coordinator of the University of Pennsylvania on February 20, 2006. After one season at Penn, he returned to Yale as the special teams coordinator for two seasons. On May 18, 2009 Halloran was appointment as the head football coach and athletic coordinator at North Forest High School in Houston, Texas.

== Head coaching record ==
=== College ===
Year	Team	Overall	Conference	Standing	Bowl/playoffs
Franklin & Marshall Diplomats (Centennial Conference) (2003–2005)
2003	Franklin & Marshall	4–6	3–3	4th	
2004	Franklin & Marshall	8–3	4–2	T–1st	W ECAC South Championship
2005	Franklin & Marshall	5–6	4–2	2nd	L ECAC South Championship
Franklin & Marshall:		17–15	11–7		
Total:		17–15			
National championship Conference title Conference division title or championship game berth
