= 1986 Florida Gators football team =

American college football season

1986 Florida Gators football
- Conference: Southeastern Conference
- Record: 6–5 (2–4 SEC)
- Head coach: Galen Hall (3rd season)
- Defensive coordinator: Zaven Yaralian (1st season)
- Home stadium: Florida Field

1986 Southeastern Conference football standings
	Conf.					Overall
Team	W		L		T	W		L		T
No. 10 LSU $	5	–	1	–	0	9	–	3	–	0
No. 6 Auburn	4	–	2	–	0	10	–	2	–	0
No. 9 Alabama	4	–	2	–	0	10	–	3	–	0
Georgia	4	–	2	–	0	8	–	4	–	0
Ole Miss	4	–	2	–	0	8	–	3	–	1
Tennessee	3	–	3	–	0	7	–	5	–	0
Mississippi State	2	–	4	–	0	6	–	5	–	0
Kentucky	2	–	4	–	0	5	–	5	–	1
Florida	2	–	4	–	0	6	–	5	–	0
Vanderbilt	0	–	6	–	0	1	–	10	–	0
$ – Conference champion; Rankings from AP Poll

The 1986 Florida Gators football team represented the University of Florida during the 1986 NCAA Division I-A football season. The season was Galen Hall's third as the head coach of the Florida Gators football team. The 1986 Florida Gators compiled a 6–5 overall record and a Southeastern Conference (SEC) record of 2–4, tying for 7th place among Ten SEC teams. This was the last year that Florida lost to the Kentucky Wildcats until 2018. This was the longest annual win streak of any team over another in NCAA history and the longest such streak in Southeastern Conference history.

== Schedule ==
Date	Opponent	Rank	Site	TV	Result	Attendance	Source
August 30	No. 1 (I-AA) Georgia Southern*	No. 13	Florida Field; Gainesville, FL		W 38–14	74,221	
September 6	No. 3 Miami (FL)*	No. 13	Florida Field; Gainesville, FL (rivalry)		L 15–23	74,875	
September 20	No. 4 Alabama	No. 13	Florida Field; Gainesville, FL (rivalry)		L 7–21	74,685	
September 27	at Mississippi State		Scott Field; Starkville, MS		L 10–16	38,625	
October 4	No. 18 LSU		Florida Field; Gainesville, FL (rivalry)	TigerVision	L 17–28	74,211	
October 11	Kent State*^{†}		Florida Field; Gainesville, FL		W 52–9	73,718	
October 18	at Rutgers*		Giants Stadium; East Rutherford, NJ		W 15–3	36,781	
November 1	No. 5 Auburn		Florida Field; Gainesville, FL (rivalry)		W 18–17	74,521	
November 8	vs. No. 19 Georgia		Gator Bowl Stadium; Jacksonville, FL (rivalry)		W 31–19	81,957	
November 15	at Kentucky		Commonwealth Stadium; Lexington, KY (rivalry)		L 3–10	52,160	
November 29	at Florida State*		Doak Campbell Stadium; Tallahassee, FL (rivalry)		W 17–13	62,370	
*Non-conference game; ^{†}Homecoming; Rankings from AP Poll released prior to the game

== Personnel ==
1986 Florida Gators football team roster
Players
Coaches
Offense

Pos.	#	Name	Class
QB	12	Kerwin Bell	Jr
RB		Larry Bernstein
QB		Rodney Brewer
OL		John Durden
RB		Dwayne Ferguson (C)
WR		Ed Frazier
RB		Octavius Gould
WR		Eric Hodges
TE		Rodney Jones
QB		Pepe Lescano
RB		Tony Lomack
RB		James Massey
OL		Frank McCarthy
TE		Mark McGriff
WR	89	Ricky Nattiel (C)	Sr
WR		Stacey Simmons
OL		Bob Sims
RB		Cedric Smith
WR		Bret Wiechmann
RB		Anthony Williams
OL		David Williams
RB		Wayne Williams
WR		Darrell Woulard
OL		Charlie Wright
OL		Jeff Zimmerman

Defense

Pos.	#	Name	Class
LB		Scott Armstrong (C)
LB		Clifford Charlton
DB		Richard Fain
LB		Pat Moorer
LB		Ron Moten
DB		Rick Mulberry
DB		Louis Oliver
DL		Jeff Roth
LB		Steve Stipe
DB		Kerry Watkins
DL		Rhondy Weston
DB		Adrian White
LB		Arthur White
DB		Jarvis Williams
DL		Keith Williams

Special teams

Pos.	#	Name	Class
K		Jeff Dawson
P		Jamie McAndrew
K		Robert McGinty

Head coach

- Galen Hall

Coordinators/assistant coaches

- Zaven Yaralian (DC)
- Mike Heimerdinger (WR)

Legend

- (C) Team captain
- (S) Suspended
- (I) Ineligible
- Injured
- Redshirt

== Game summaries ==
=== Georgia Southern ===
	1	2	3	4	Total
Georgia Southern	0	0	0	14	14
Florida	7	14	3	14	38

=== Miami (FL) ===
	1	2	3	4	Total
Miami (FL)	7	0	9	7	23
Florida	0	9	0	6	15

=== Alabama ===
	1	2	3	4	Total
Alabama	0	0	14	7	21
Florida	7	0	0	0	7

=== At Mississippi State ===
	1	2	3	4	Total
Florida	7	0	3	0	10
Mississippi State	0	10	3	3	16

=== LSU ===
	1	2	3	4	Total
LSU	14	7	0	7	28
Florida	3	14	0	0	17

Kerwin Bell was injured during the game.

=== Kent State ===
Team	1	2	3	4	Total
Kent State	0	3	0	6	9
• Florida	7	21	14	10	52

- Date: October 11
- Location: Florida Field, Gainesville, FL
- Game attendance: 73,718

Scoring summary
1	FLA	Gould 7 yard run (Dawson kick)	FLA 7-0
2	FLA	Massey 5 yard run (Dawson kick)	FLA 14-0
2	KSU	Steinberg 27 yard field goal	FLA 14-3
2	FLA	A. Williams 12 yard pass from Brewer (Dawson kick)	FLA 21-3
2	FLA	Gould 2 yard run (Dawson kick)	FLA 28-3
3	FLA	Nattiel 60 yard pass from Brewer (Dawson kick)	FLA 35-3
3	FLA	Gould 1 yard run (Dawson kick)	FLA 42-3
4	FLA	Dawson 30 yard field goal	FLA 45-3
4	FLA	W. Williams 9 yard run (Dawson kick)	FLA 52-3
4	KSU	Potter 1 yard run (run failed)	FLA 52-9

=== At Rutgers ===
	1	2	3	4	Total
Florida	6	0	9	0	15
Rutgers	0	0	3	0	3

at Giants Stadium

=== Auburn ===
#5 Auburn at Florida

Team	1	2	3	4	Total
Auburn	7	7	3	0	17
• Florida	0	0	0	18	18

- Date: November 1
- Location: Florida Field, Gainesville, FL
- Game attendance: 74,521

Scoring summary
1	5:50	AUB	Ware 1 yard run (Knapp kick)	AUB 7-0
2	14:53	AUB	Fullwood 11 yard run (Knapp kick)	AUB 14-0
3	:14	AUB	Knapp 31 yard field goal	AUB 17-0
4	12:09	FLA	Bell 1 yard run (Dawson kick)	AUB 17-7
4	7:10	FLA	McGinty 51 yard field goal	AUB 17-10
4	:36	FLA	Nattiel 5 yard pass from Bell (Bell run)

For most of the game, coach Pat Dye's fifth-ranked 1986 Auburn Tigers dominated coach Galen Hall's unranked Gators at Florida Field. The Tigers defense was stifling, and forced Gators substitute quarterback Rodney Brewer to commit four turnovers in the first two quarters. Hall replaced Brewer with starting quarterback Kerwin Bell, who had missed two games with a knee injury. Tigers tailback Brent Fullwood gained 166 yards on the ground, including a second-quarter touchdown, to give Auburn a 17–0 lead early in the fourth quarter. Bell then led the Gators on two scoring drives, with Gators placekicker Robert McGinty—a transfer from Auburn—booting a 51-yard field goal to close the Tigers' advantage to 17−10 with 1:45 to play. With thirty-six seconds remaining in the game, Bell directed one final 79-yard drive in ten plays that was capped by a five-yard touchdown pass to wide receiver Ricky Nattiel, who was playing with a separated shoulder. The limping Bell then surprised the Tigers defense by running in the two-point conversion and completing the comeback, with the Gators winning 18–17.

=== vs Georgia ===
Florida Gators (4–4) vs. #19 Georgia Bulldogs (6–2)

Quarter	1	2	3	4	Total
Georgia	10	6	3	0	19
Florida	0	10	7	14	31

at Gator Bowl, Jacksonville, Florida

- Date: November 8, 1986
- Game attendance: 81,957
- Box Score

Team	Category	Player	Statistics
Georgia	Passing	James Jackson	4/17, 50 Yds
Georgia	Rushing	Lars Tate	24 Att, 86 Yds, TD
Georgia	Receiving	Kirk Warner	1 Rec, 22 Yds
Florida	Passing	Kerwin Bell	20/31, 272 Yds, 3 TD, INT
Florida	Rushing	James Massey	13 Att, 49 Yds, TD
Florida	Receiving	Ricky Nattiel	7 Rec, 97 Yds, 3 TD

Full broadcast on YouTube
Game highlights on YouTube

Scoring summary

Quarter	Time	Drive			Team	Scoring information	Score	
Quarter	Time	Plays	Yards	TOP	Team	Scoring information	UGA	UF
1			68		Georgia	Lars Tate 1-yard touchdown run, Steve Crumley kick good	7	0
1					Georgia	24-yard field goal by Steve Crumley	10	0
2					Florida	23-yard field goal by Jeff Dawson	10	3
2					Georgia	35-yard field goal by Steve Crumley	13	3
2	7:50				Georgia	45-yard field goal by Steve Crumley	16	3
2	2:14				Florida	Ricky Nattiel 8-yard touchdown reception from Kerwin Bell, Steve Dawson kick good	16	10
3	5:23				Georgia	43-yard field goal by Steve Crumley	19	10
3					Florida	Ricky Nattiel 9-yard touchdown reception from Kerwin Bell, Steve Dawson kick good	19	17
4					Florida	James Massey 3-yard touchdown run, Steve Dawson kick good	19	24
4	5:34				Florida	Ricky Nattiel 42-yard touchdown reception from Kerwin Bell, Steve Dawson kick good	19	31
"TOP" = time of possession. For other American football terms, see Glossary of American football.							19	31

=== At Kentucky ===
	1	2	3	4	Total
Florida	0	3	0	0	3
Kentucky	7	0	0	3	10

=== At Florida State ===
	1	2	3	4	Total
Florida	7	3	0	7	17
Florida State	3	7	3	0	13
