= 1986 Sun Bowl =

American college football game

1986 John Hancock Sun Bowl
| Washington Huskies | Alabama Crimson Tide |
| (8–2–1) | (9–3) |
| Pac-10 | SEC |
| 6 | 28 |
| Head coach: Don James | Head coach: Ray Perkins |
| AP / Coaches; 12 / 11 | AP / Coaches; 13 / 14 |
| | 1 | 2 | 3 | 4 | Total |
|---|---|---|---|---|---|
| Washington | 0 | 6 | 0 | 0 | 6 |
| Alabama | 0 | 7 | 14 | 7 | 28 |
- Date: December 25, 1986
- Season: 1986
- Stadium: Sun Bowl
- Location: El Paso, Texas
- MVP: Cornelius Bennett, Alabama DE; Steve Alvord, Washington G
- Favorite: Alabama by 2 points
- Referee: Frank Shepard (SWC)
- Attendance: 48,722

United States TV coverage
- Network: CBS
- Announcers: Brent Musburger, Ara Parseghian, John Dockery

The 1986 Sun Bowl featured the Alabama Crimson Tide of the Southeastern Conference (SEC) and the Washington Huskies of the Pacific-10 Conference. In Ray Perkins's final game as Alabama head coach, the Crimson Tide defeated the Huskies 28–6.

This was the first edition of the Sun Bowl that carried corporate sponsorship, as John Hancock Financial entered a three-year, $1.5 million partnership. The Fiesta Bowl had done so approximately a year earlier, entering a sponsorship agreement in September 1985 and playing its January 1986 edition as the Sunkist Fiesta Bowl.

== Teams ==
=== Alabama ===
Alabama opened the season with seven wins, then lost three of its final five regular season games to finish with a 9–3 record. Following their loss to Auburn in the Iron Bowl, university officials announced they accepted an invitation to play in the Sun Bowl. The appearance marked the second for Alabama in the Sun Bowl, and their 39th bowl game. The Tide was favored by two points.

=== Washington ===
Washington finished the regular season with an 8–2–1 record. Tied for second place in the Pac-10, the Huskies lost to USC and Arizona State, and tied UCLA. Following their victory over Washington State in the Apple Cup, university officials announced they accepted an invitation to play in the Sun Bowl. It was Washington's second appearance in the Sun Bowl, and their 17th bowl game.

== Game summary ==
After a scoreless first quarter, Alabama scored first on a 64-yard Bobby Humphrey touchdown run. Washington responded with a pair of Jeff Jaeger field goals to cut the lead to 7–6 at the half.

With a pair of touchdowns in the third quarter, Alabama extended their lead to 21–6. Mike Shula was responsible for both touchdowns with the first coming on a 32-yard pass to Greg Richardson and the second on a 17-yard pass to Bobby Humphrey. Humphrey then scored the final points of the game midway through the fourth on a three-yard run to cap a 16-play, 92-yard drive.

Scoring summary

| Quarter | Time | Drive | | | Team | Scoring information | Score | |
| Quarter | Time | Plays | Yards | TOP | Team | Scoring information | Washington | Alabama |
|---|---|---|---|---|---|---|---|---|
| 2 | 13:45 | | 3 plays, 72 yards | 1:15 | Alabama | Bobby Humphrey 64-yard touchdown run, Van Tiffin kick good | 0 | 7 |
| 2 | 5:55 | | 11 plays, 48 yards | | Washington | 31-yard field goal by Jeff Jaeger | 3 | 7 |
| 2 | 0:38 | | 11 plays, 47 yards | | Washington | 34-yard field goal by Jeff Jaeger | 6 | 7 |
| 3 | 6:24 | | 6 plays, 48 yards | | Alabama | Greg Richardson 32-yard touchdown reception from Mike Shula, Van Tiffin kick good | 6 | 14 |
| 3 | 0:13 | | 6 plays, 83 yards | | Alabama | Bobby Humphrey 17-yard touchdown reception from Mike Shula, Van Tiffin kick good | 6 | 21 |
| 4 | 7:16 | | 16 plays, 92 yards | | Alabama | Bobby Humphrey 3-yard touchdown run, Van Tiffin kick good | 6 | 28 |
| "TOP" = time of possession. For other American football terms, see Glossary of American football. | | | | | | | 6 | 28 |

== Aftermath ==
According to then Washington defensive coordinator Jim Lambright, this game highlighted the need for Washington to begin to recruit speed more seriously. Lambright would later be quoted as saying, "[i]t was after our bowl game against Alabama in the Sun Bowl [that we started recruiting speed specifically] .... [W]hen we broke down the film, there was no way that our personnel matched their personnel as far as speed. So we went out after that to specifically recruit faster people .... We weren't selective enough up to that point with speed."

Five years later in the 1991 season, Washington went undefeated and won the national championship.
