= 1986 Ole Miss Rebels football team =

American college football season

1986 Ole Miss Rebels football

Independence Bowl champion

Independence Bowl, W 20–17 vs. Texas Tech
- Conference: Southeastern Conference
- Record: 8–3–1 (4–2 SEC)
- Head coach: Billy Brewer (4th season)
- Offensive coordinator: Bill Canty (1st season)
- Defensive coordinator: Carl Torbush (4th season)
- Home stadium: Vaught–Hemingway Stadium; Mississippi Veterans Memorial Stadium

1986 Southeastern Conference football standings
	Conf.					Overall
Team	W		L		T	W		L		T
No. 10 LSU $	5	–	1	–	0	9	–	3	–	0
No. 6 Auburn	4	–	2	–	0	10	–	2	–	0
No. 9 Alabama	4	–	2	–	0	10	–	3	–	0
Georgia	4	–	2	–	0	8	–	4	–	0
Ole Miss	4	–	2	–	0	8	–	3	–	1
Tennessee	3	–	3	–	0	7	–	5	–	0
Mississippi State	2	–	4	–	0	6	–	5	–	0
Kentucky	2	–	4	–	0	5	–	5	–	1
Florida	2	–	4	–	0	6	–	5	–	0
Vanderbilt	0	–	6	–	0	1	–	10	–	0
$ – Conference champion; Rankings from AP Poll

The 1986 Ole Miss Rebels football team represented the University of Mississippi in the sport of American football during the 1986 NCAA Division I-A football season. The team won eight games, lost three, and had one tie. It concluded the season with a 20–17 victory over the Texas Tech Red Raiders in the 1986 Independence Bowl. During the season, Ole Miss was charged with recruiting violations and placed on a two-year probation, which was to take away 10 scholarships and bar the team from a bowl game and live television in 1987.

The Rebels' 21-19 victory over LSU was their first in Baton Rouge since 1968.

The team's statistical leaders included quarterback Mark Young with 1,154 passing yards, running back Willie Goodloe with 526 rushing yards, wide receiver J.R. Ambrose with 578 receiving yards, and placekicker Bryan Owen with 52 points scored.

== Schedule ==
Date	Time	Opponent	Rank	Site	TV	Result	Attendance	Source
September 6	6:00 pm	Memphis State*		Mississippi Veterans Memorial Stadium; Jackson, MS (rivalry)		W 28–6	43,600	
September 13	6:00 pm	at No. 18 Arkansas*		War Memorial Stadium; Little Rock, AR (rivalry)		L 0–21	55,230	
September 20	1:00 pm	Arkansas State*		Vaught–Hemingway Stadium; Oxford, MS		T 10–10	26,500	
September 27	1:00 pm	Tulane*		Vaught–Hemingway Stadium; Oxford, MS (rivalry)	TBS	W 35–10	25,000	
October 4	11:35 am	at Georgia		Sanford Stadium; Athens, GA	TBS	L 10–14	80,227	
October 11	1:00 pm	Kentucky		Mississippi Veterans Memorial Stadium; Jackson, MS		W 33–13	28,000	
October 18	1:00 pm	Southwestern Louisiana*^{†}		Vaught–Hemingway Stadium; Oxford, MS		W 21–20	33,500	
October 25	1:00 pm	at Vanderbilt		Vanderbilt Stadium; Nashville, TN (rivalry)		W 28–12	34,427	
November 1	2:30 pm	at No. 12 LSU		Tiger Stadium; Baton Rouge, LA (rivalry)	ABC	W 21–19	77,758	
November 15	11:35 am	Tennessee	No. 20	Mississippi Veterans Memorial Stadium; Jackson, MS (rivalry)	TBS	L 10–22	35,000	
November 22	11:35 am	vs. Mississippi State		Mississippi Veterans Memorial Stadium; Jackson, MS (Egg Bowl)	TBS	W 24–3	44,500	
December 20	7:00 pm	vs. Texas Tech*		Independence Stadium; Shreveport, LA (Independence Bowl)	MizLou/USA	W 20–17	46,369	
*Non-conference game; ^{†}Homecoming; Rankings from AP Poll released prior to the game

== Personnel ==
1986 Ole Miss Rebels football team roster
Players
Coaches
Offense

Pos.	#	Name	Class
OL		Rich Adamcik
WR		J.R. Ambrose
RB		Johnny Boatman
RB		Chuck Cleveland
RB		Tony Dentley
OL		Rob Goff
RB		Willie Goodloe
WR		Willie Green
RB		Reid Hines
OL		Danny Hoskins
OL		Todd Irvin
OL		Derek King
OL		James King
TE		Greg Lee
WR		Bobby Martin
RB		Joe Mickles
WR		Ricky Myers
QB		Chris Osgood
TE		Mario Perry
OL		Jeff Rhodes
OL		Jay Schimmel
OL		Steve Sutton
RB		Shawn Sykes
QB		Mark Young

Defense

Pos.	#	Name	Class
LB		Jeff Bacon
LB		Bubba Dickey
DL		Mike Fitzsimmons
DL		Lance Hathcock
LB		Jeff Herrod
DB		Derrick Lindsay
DL		Rodney Lowe
DB		Stevon Moore
DL		Ben Morris
DB		Howard Moss
S		Jeff Noblin
DB		Don Price
DL		Arthur Scott
DL		Darryl Smith
LB		Robert Smith
DL		Wesley Walls

Special teams

Pos.	#	Name	Class
K		Bryan Owen
P		Bill Smith

Head coach

- Billy Brewer

Coordinators/assistant coaches

Legend

- (C) Team captain
- (S) Suspended
- (I) Ineligible
- Injured
- Redshirt
