= 1986 LSU Tigers football team =

American college football season

1986 LSU Tigers football

SEC champion

Sugar Bowl, L 15–30 vs. Nebraska
- Conference: Southeastern Conference

Ranking
- Coaches: No. 11
- AP: No. 10
- Record: 9–3 (5–1 SEC)
- Head coach: Bill Arnsparger (3rd season)
- Offensive coordinator: Ed Zaunbrecher (3rd season)
- Defensive coordinator: Mike Archer (1st season)
- Home stadium: Tiger Stadium

1986 Southeastern Conference football standings
| | Conf. | | | | | Overall |
| Team | W | | L | | T | W | | L | | T |
|---|---|---|---|---|---|---|---|---|---|---|
| No. 10 LSU $ | 5 | – | 1 | – | 0 | 9 | – | 3 | – | 0 |
| No. 6 Auburn | 4 | – | 2 | – | 0 | 10 | – | 2 | – | 0 |
| No. 9 Alabama | 4 | – | 2 | – | 0 | 10 | – | 3 | – | 0 |
| Georgia | 4 | – | 2 | – | 0 | 8 | – | 4 | – | 0 |
| Ole Miss | 4 | – | 2 | – | 0 | 8 | – | 3 | – | 1 |
| Tennessee | 3 | – | 3 | – | 0 | 7 | – | 5 | – | 0 |
| Mississippi State | 2 | – | 4 | – | 0 | 6 | – | 5 | – | 0 |
| Kentucky | 2 | – | 4 | – | 0 | 5 | – | 5 | – | 1 |
| Florida | 2 | – | 4 | – | 0 | 6 | – | 5 | – | 0 |
| Vanderbilt | 0 | – | 6 | – | 0 | 1 | – | 10 | – | 0 |
$ – Conference champion; Rankings from AP Poll

The 1986 LSU Tigers football team, represented Louisiana State University during the 1986 NCAA Division I-A football season. The team was led by Bill Arnsparger in his third and final season and finished with an overall record of nine wins and three losses (9–3 overall, 5–1 in the SEC), as Southeastern Conference (SEC) champions and with a loss against Nebraska in the Sugar Bowl.

Following the season, Arnsparger resigned to become athletic director at the University of Florida, and was replaced by defensive coordinator Mike Archer.

== Schedule ==
| Date | Time | Opponent | Rank | Site | TV | Result | Attendance | Source |
|---|---|---|---|---|---|---|---|---|
| September 13 | 7:00 p.m. | No. 7 Texas A&M* | No. 14 | Tiger Stadium; Baton Rouge, LA (rivalry) | ESPN | W 35–17 | 79,713 | |
| September 20 | 7:00 p.m. | Miami (OH)* | No. 8 | Tiger Stadium; Baton Rouge, LA | TigerVision | L 12–21 | 75,777 | |
| October 4 | 12:30 p.m. | at Florida | No. 18 | Florida Field; Gainesville, FL (rivalry) | TigerVision | W 28–17 | 74,211 | |
| October 11 | 7:00 p.m. | Georgia | No. 16 | Tiger Stadium; Baton Rouge, LA | TigerVision | W 23–14 | 78,252 | |
| October 18 | 6:30 p.m. | at Kentucky | No. 12 | Commonwealth Stadium; Lexington, KY | TigerVision | W 25–16 | 57,201 | |
| October 25 | 7:00 p.m. | North Carolina*^{†} | No. 12 | Tiger Stadium; Baton Rouge, LA | TigerVision | W 30–3 | 78,301 | |
| November 1 | 2:30 p.m. | Ole Miss | No. 12 | Tiger Stadium; Baton Rouge, LA (rivlary) | ABC | L 19–21 | 77,758 | |
| November 8 | 7:00 p.m. | at No. 6 Alabama | No. 18 | Legion Field; Birmingham, AL (rivalry) | ESPN | W 14–10 | 75,808 | |
| November 15 | 7:30 p.m. | at Mississippi State | No. 12 | Mississippi Veterans Memorial Stadium; Jackson, MS (rivalry) | TigerVision | W 47–0 | 48,000 | |
| November 22 | 7:00 p.m. | Notre Dame* | No. 8 | Tiger Stadium; Baton Rouge, LA | ESPN | W 21–19 | 78,197 | |
| November 29 | 7:00 p.m. | Tulane* | No. 5 | Tiger Stadium; Baton Rouge, LA (Battle for the Rag) | TigerVision | W 37–17 | 78,131 | |
| January 1, 1987 | 3:00 p.m. | vs. No. 6 Nebraska* | No. 5 | Louisiana Superdome; New Orleans, LA (Sugar Bowl) | ABC | L 15–30 | 76,234 | |
*Non-conference game; ^{†}Homecoming; Rankings from AP Poll released prior to the game; All times are in Central time

== Rankings ==
Ranking movements Legend: ██ Increase in ranking ██ Decrease in ranking — = Not ranked
| | Week | | | | | | | | | | | | | | |
| Poll | Pre | 1 | 2 | 3 | 4 | 5 | 6 | 7 | 8 | 9 | 10 | 11 | 12 | 13 | Final |
|---|---|---|---|---|---|---|---|---|---|---|---|---|---|---|---|
| AP | 15 | 14 | 8 | 18 | 18 | 16 | 12 | 12 | 12 | 18 | 12 | 8 | 5 | 5 | 10 |
| Coaches | 19 | 17 | 8 | — | — | — | 12 | 11 | 11 | 18 | 11 | 8 | 6 | 6 | 11 |

== Game summaries ==
=== No. 7 Texas A&M ===
Texas A&M Aggies at LSU Tigers (0–0)

| Quarter | 1 | 2 | 3 | 4 | Total |
|---|---|---|---|---|---|
| Texas A&M | 7 | 7 | 3 | 0 | 17 |
| LSU | 7 | 7 | 14 | 7 | 35 |

at Tiger Stadium • Baton Rouge, Louisiana

- Date: September 13
- Game attendance: 79,713
- TV: ESPN
- Reference: Gainesville Sun. 1986 Sep 14.

Game information

- A&M - Walker 5 yard pass from Murray (Slater kick)
- LSU - Martin 3 yard pass from Hodson (Lewis kick)
- A&M - Bernstine 13 yard pass from Murray (Slater kick)
- LSU - Martin 66 yard pass from Guidry (Lewis kick)
- A&M - Slater 22 yard field goal
- LSU - Williams 1 yard run (Lewis kick)
- LSU - Kinchen 5 yard pass from Hodson (Lewis kick)
- LSU - Brooks 36 yard interception return (Lewis kick)

Texas A&M

- Murray
  24/35, 208 Yds, TD, 4 INT
- Vick
  21 Rush, 63 Yds
- Bernstine
  8 Rec, 71 Yds, TD

LSU

- Hodson
  15/21, 193 Yds, 2 TD
- Martin
  12 Rush, 62 Yds
- Davis
  10 Rec, 132 Yds

=== Ole Miss ===
Ole Miss Rebels at #12 LSU Tigers

| Quarter | 1 | 2 | 3 | 4 | Total |
|---|---|---|---|---|---|
| Ole Miss | 7 | 14 | 0 | 0 | 21 |
| LSU | 6 | 3 | 7 | 3 | 19 |

at Tiger Stadium, Baton Rouge, Louisiana

- Date: November 1, 1986
- Game attendance: 77,758
- Gainesville Sun, 1986 Nov 02.

Game information

First quarter

- LSU – David Browndyke 40-yard field goal. LSU 3–0. Drive:
- LSU – David Browndyke 31-yard field goal. LSU 6–0. Drive:
- MISS – J.R. Ambrose 23-yard run (Bryan Owen kick). Ole Miss 7–6. Drive:

Second quarter

- MISS – Tony Dentley 5-yard run (Bryan Owen kick). Ole Miss 14–6. Drive:
- LSU – David Browndyke 52-yard field goal. Ole Miss 14–9. Drive:
- MISS – Mark Young 2-yard run (Bryan Owen kick). Ole Miss 21–9. Drive:

Third quarter

- LSU – Wendell Davis 29-yard pass from Tommy Hodson (David Browndyke kick). Ole Miss 21–16. Drive:

Fourth quarter

- LSU – David Browndyke 21-yard field goal. Ole Miss 21–19. Drive:

Top passers

- MISS – Mark Young – 18/31, 171 yards, INT
- LSU – Tommy Hodson – 21/39, 251 yards, TD

Top rushers

- MISS – Joe Mickles – 14 rushes, 57 yards
- LSU – Sammy Martin – 17 rushes, 73 yards

Top receivers

- MISS – Willie Green – 4 receptions, 54 yards
- LSU – Wendell Davis – 14 receptions, 204 yards, TD

=== At No. 6 Alabama ===
| Team | 1 | 2 | 3 | 4 | Total |
|---|---|---|---|---|---|
| • No. 18 Tigers | 0 | 14 | 0 | 0 | 14 |
| No. 6 Crimson Tide | 7 | 0 | 3 | 0 | 10 |

- Date: November 8
- Location: Legion Field, Birmingham, Alabama
- Game attendance: 75,808
- Television network: ESPN

=== Vs. No. 6 Nebraska (Sugar Bowl) ===
Nebraska vs LSU

| Team | 1 | 2 | 3 | 4 | Total |
|---|---|---|---|---|---|
| • No. 6 Cornhuskers | 0 | 10 | 7 | 13 | 30 |
| No. 5 Tigers | 7 | 0 | 0 | 8 | 15 |

- Date: January 1
- Location: Louisiana Superdome, New Orleans, Louisiana
- Game start: 2:40 p.m. CST
- Game attendance: 76,234

== Roster ==
1986 LSU Tigers football team roster
Players
Coaches
Offense

| Pos. | # | Name | Class |
|---|---|---|---|
| C | 56 | Nacho Albergamo | Jr |
| G | 76 | Eric Andolsek | Jr |
| TE | | Kenny Davidson |
| WR | 82 | Wendell Davis | Jr |
| TE | 89 | Karl Dunbar | Fr |
| RB | | Tommy Edick |
| RB | | Jay Egloff |
| RB | | Eddie Fuller |
| QB | 10 | Mickey Guidry |
| TE | | Ronnie Haliburton |
| RB | | Mickey Harris |
| OL | | John Hazard |
| QB | 13 | Tommy Hodson | Fr |
| RB | | Garland Jean-Baptiste |
| RB | | Victor Jones |
| RB | | Randy Keiser |
| TE | 49 | Brian Kinchen | Jr |
| RB | | Alvin Lee |
| WR | 80 | Rogie Magee | Jr |
| RB | 23 | Sammy Martin | Jr |
| OL | | Keith Melancon |
| WR | 6 | Tony Moss | Fr |
| OL | | Ralph Norwood |
| QB | | Doug Powell |
| WR | | Derrick Saulsberry |
| RB | 22 | Harvey Williams | Fr |

Defense

| Pos. | # | Name | Class |
|---|---|---|---|
| LB | 98 | Verge Ausberry | Fr |
| DL | 77 | Roland Barbay | Sr |
| S | 35 | Jamie Bice | So |
| LB | 94 | Michael Brooks | Sr |
| DB | | Willie Bryant | Jr |
| S | 11 | Chris Carrier | Jr |
| LB | 69 | Toby Caston | Sr |
| DB | | Kevin Guidry |
| LB | 48 | Nicky Hazard | Jr |
| LB | 58 | Eric Hill | So |
| DB | 35 | Greg Jackson | So |
| DB | 12 | Norman Jefferson | Sr |
| LB | | Oliver Lawrence |
| LB | | Darren Marlbrough |
| NG | 62 | Darrell Phillips | So |
| DB | | James Pierson |
| DB | 7 | Steve Rehage | Sr |
| LB | 52 | Ron Sancho | So |
| DL | 97 | Henry Thomas | Sr |
| DL | 77 | Karl Wilson |

Special teams

| Pos. | # | Name | Class |
|---|---|---|---|
| K | 4 | David Browndyke | Fr |
| P | 3 | Matt DeFrank | Jr |
| K | 8 | Ron Lewis | Jr |

Head coach

- Bill Arnsparger

Coordinators/assistant coaches

- Ed Zaunbrecher – Offensive coordinator/quarterbacks
- Jesse Daigle – Running backs
- Jerry Sullivan – Wide receivers
- Terry Lewis – Tight ends
- Pete Mangurian – Offensive line
- Mike Archer – Defensive coordinator/defensive backs
- Pete Jenkins – Defensive line
- Mike Nolan – Linebackers
- John Symank – Linebackers/recruiting coordinator

Legend

- (C) Team captain
- (S) Suspended
- (I) Ineligible
- Injured
- Redshirt
