= 1986 Tennessee Volunteers football team =

American college football season

1986 Tennessee Volunteers football

Liberty Bowl champion

Liberty Bowl, W 21–14 vs. Minnesota
- Conference: Southeastern Conference
- Record: 7–5 (3–3 SEC)
- Head coach: Johnny Majors (10th season)
- Offensive coordinator: Walt Harris (4th season)
- Defensive coordinator: Ken Donahue (2nd season)
- Captains: Joey Clinkscales; Dale Jones; Bruce Wilkerson
- Home stadium: Neyland Stadium

1986 Southeastern Conference football standings
	Conf.					Overall
Team	W		L		T	W		L		T
No. 10 LSU $	5	–	1	–	0	9	–	3	–	0
No. 6 Auburn	4	–	2	–	0	10	–	2	–	0
No. 9 Alabama	4	–	2	–	0	10	–	3	–	0
Georgia	4	–	2	–	0	8	–	4	–	0
Ole Miss	4	–	2	–	0	8	–	3	–	1
Tennessee	3	–	3	–	0	7	–	5	–	0
Mississippi State	2	–	4	–	0	6	–	5	–	0
Kentucky	2	–	4	–	0	5	–	5	–	1
Florida	2	–	4	–	0	6	–	5	–	0
Vanderbilt	0	–	6	–	0	1	–	10	–	0
$ – Conference champion; Rankings from AP Poll

The 1986 Tennessee Volunteers football team (variously "Tennessee" or the "Vols") represented the University of Tennessee in the 1986 NCAA Division I-A football season. Playing as a member of the Southeastern Conference (SEC), the team was led by head coach Johnny Majors, in his tenth year, and played their home games at Neyland Stadium in Knoxville, Tennessee. They finished the season with a record of seven wins and five losses (7–5 overall, 3–3 in the SEC) and with a victory over Minnesota in the Liberty Bowl. The Volunteers offense scored 293 points while the defense allowed 249 points.

== Schedule ==
Date	Opponent	Rank	Site	TV	Result	Attendance	Source
September 6	New Mexico*	No. 10	Neyland Stadium; Knoxville, TN		W 35–21	93,875	
September 13	Mississippi State	No. 8	Neyland Stadium; Knoxville, TN	TBS	L 27–23	89,897	
September 27	at No. 8 Auburn		Jordan–Hare Stadium; Auburn, AL	ABC	L 8–34	72,500	
October 4	UTEP*		Neyland Stadium; Knoxville, TN		W 26–16	92,824	
October 11	Army*		Neyland Stadium; Knoxville, TN		L 21–25	91,343	
October 18	No. 2 Alabama		Neyland Stadium; Knoxville, TN (Third Saturday in October)	ABC	L 28–56	95,115	
October 25	at Georgia Tech*		Grant Field; Atlanta, GA	TBS	L 13–14	28,432	
November 8	Memphis State*^{†}		Neyland Stadium; Knoxville, TN		W 33–3	89,815	
November 15	at No. 20 Ole Miss		Mississippi Veterans Memorial Stadium; Jackson, MS (rivalry)	TBS	W 22–10	35,000	
November 22	Kentucky		Neyland Stadium; Knoxville, TN (rivalry)		W 28–9	90,747	
November 29	at Vanderbilt		Vanderbilt Stadium; Nashville, TN		W 35–20	41,572	
December 29	vs. Minnesota*		Liberty Bowl Memorial Stadium; Memphis, TN (Liberty Bowl)	Raycom	W 21–14	51,357	
*Non-conference game; ^{†}Homecoming; Rankings from AP Poll released prior to the game

== Game summaries ==
=== Vs. Minnesota (Liberty Bowl) ===
Minnesota vs. Tennessee

Team	1	2	3	4	Total
Golden Gophers	0	3	8	3	14
• Volunteers	7	7	0	7	21

- Date: December 29
- Location: Liberty Bowl Memorial Stadium, Memphis, Tennessee
- Game attendance: 51,327
- TV announcers (Raycom): Merle Harmon and Kevin Kiley

== Team players drafted into the NFL ==
Player	Position	Round	Pick	NFL club
Bruce Wilkerson	Tackle	2	52	Los Angeles Raiders
Joey Clinkscales	Wide receiver	9	233	Pittsburgh Steelers
Dale Jones	Linebacker	10	262	Dallas Cowboys
Carlos Reveiz	Kicker	11	302	New England Patriots
