= 1987 Sugar Bowl =

1987 USF&G Sugar Bowl
- 53rd Sugar Bowl
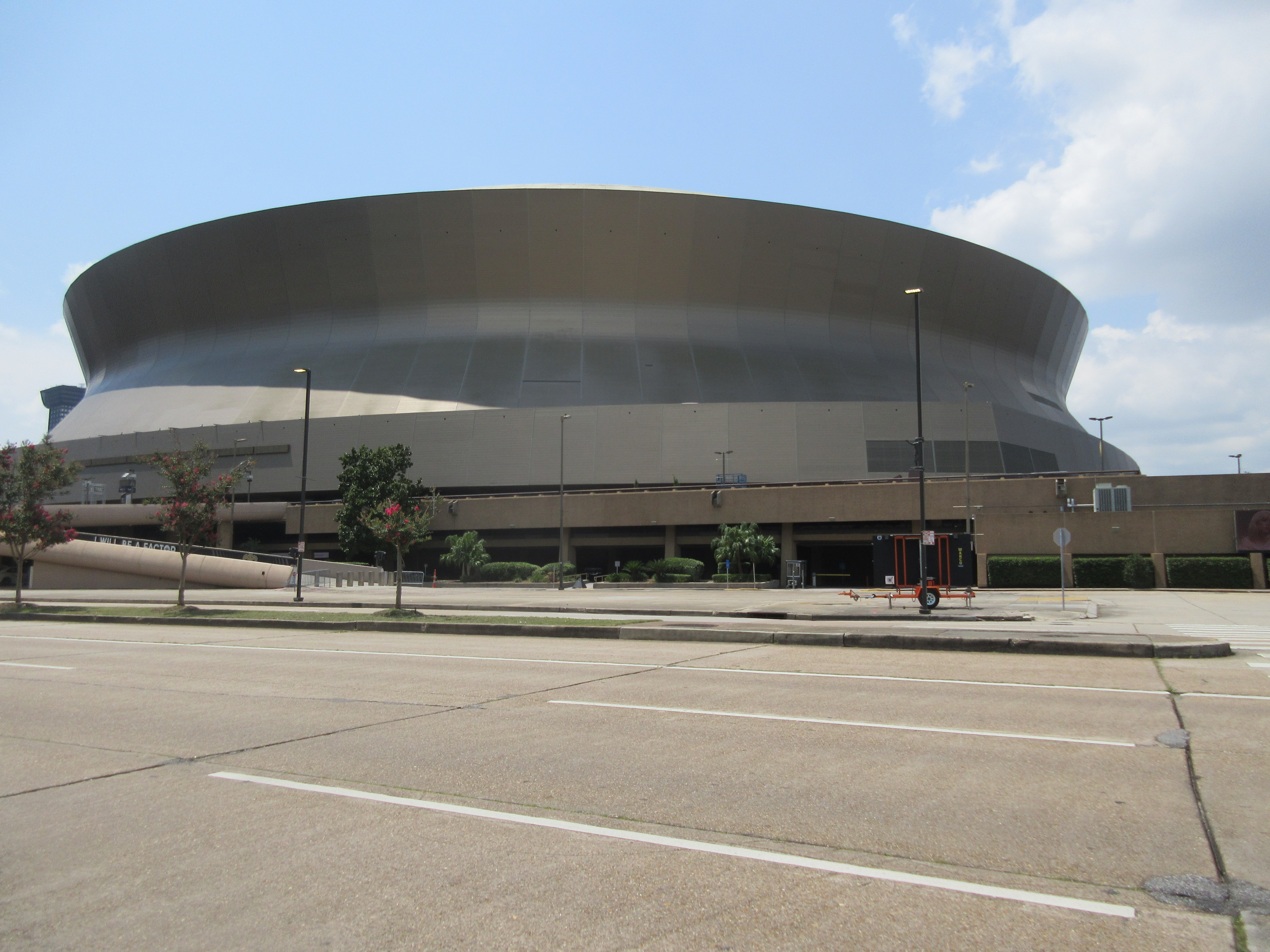
- The Louisiana Superdome in New Orleans, Louisiana, hosted the Sugar Bowl.
Nebraska Cornhuskers	LSU Tigers
(9-2)	(9-2)
Big 8	SEC
30	15
Head coach: Tom Osborne	Head coach: Bill Arnsparger
AP / Coaches; 6 / 5	AP / Coaches; 5 / 6
	1	2	3	4	Total
Nebraska	0	10	7	13	30
LSU	7	0	0	8	15
- Date: January 1, 1987
- Season: 1986
- Stadium: Louisiana Superdome
- Location: New Orleans, Louisiana
- MVP: Steve Taylor (Nebraska QB)
- Favorite: Nebraska by 4½ points
- Referee: Wendell Shelton (SWC)
- Attendance: 76,234

United States TV coverage
- Network: ABC
- Announcers: Keith Jackson, Tim Brant

The 1987 Sugar Bowl was the 53rd edition of the college football bowl game, played at the Louisiana Superdome in New Orleans, Louisiana, on Thursday, January 1. Part of the 1986–87 bowl game season, it featured the fifth-ranked LSU Tigers of the Southeastern Conference (SEC) and number 6 Nebraska Cornhuskers of the Big Eight Conference. Favored Nebraska trailed early and won, 30–15.

It was the third time in five seasons that the teams had met in a major bowl game (1983 Orange, 1985 Sugar), and Nebraska won all three.

== Teams ==
=== LSU ===
LSU won the SEC for the first time since 1970 to earn the automatic berth to the Sugar Bowl. It was the Tigers' 10th appearance, a record at the time, but this was the first time since the 1959 game LSU came in as the SEC champion. Following their SEC titles in 1961 and 1970, LSU opted to play in the Orange Bowl, defeating Colorado in the former year and losing to Nebraska in the latter. LSU received at-large bids to the games in the 1959, 1964 and 1967 seasons, while sliding into the bowl after the 1984 season when conference champion Florida was declared ineligible for the postseason (the Gators were later stripped of their title).

== Game summary ==
Both televised by ABC, the game followed the Florida Citrus Bowl and kicked off shortly after 2:30 p.m. CST, two hours after the Cotton Bowl started on CBS, and ninety minutes before the Rose Bowl on NBC.

LSU chose to wear white jerseys as the designated home team, despite an NCAA rule passed in 1983 which required the visiting team to wear white jerseys. LSU traditionally wore white at home from 1958–82, and has done so again since 1995, when the NCAA partially revoked the 1983 rule, allowing home teams to wear white with consent of the visitors. In 1997, the SEC ruled home teams would have jersey color choice without consent of the visitors for conference games, and in 2008, the NCAA allowed both teams to wear colored jerseys provided they sufficiently contrast. Nebraska athletic director Bob Devaney granted LSU's request for this game.

On the first play from scrimmage, underdog LSU gained 43 yards on a pass to Wendell Davis from freshman quarterback Tommy Hodson; the Tigers scored six plays later on a one-yard touchdown run from Harvey Williams. In the second quarter, Dale Klein kicked a 42-yard field goal for the Huskers and quarterback Steve Taylor scored on a two-yard run to give Nebraska a 10–7 lead at halftime.

Early in the second half, fullback Tyreese Knox scored from a yard out and Nebraska led a 17–7 after three quarters. Tight end Todd Millikan caught a short touchdown pass from Taylor early in the fourth, and Knox added another one-yard run for thirty unanswered points and the score was 30–7 with under four minutes remaining. Hodson threw a 24-yard touchdown pass to Tony Moss (with a two-point conversion) to tighten the final score to 30–15.

Nebraska's Taylor was named the game's most valuable player; the Huskers climbed to fifth in the final AP poll and LSU fell to tenth.

After the game, Tom Osborne said "We weren't playing for the national championship, the Big Eight Championship was out the window. The only thing we had left was the Sugar Bowl."

=== Scoring ===
First quarter

- LSU – Harvey Williams 1 run (David Browndyke kick)

Second quarter

- Nebraska – Field goal, Dale Klein 42
- Nebraska – Steve Taylor 2 run (Klein kick)

Third quarter

- Nebraska – Tyreese Knox 1 run (Klein kick)

Fourth quarter

- Nebraska – Todd Millikan 3 pass from Taylor (Klein kick)
- Nebraska – Knox 1 run (kick failed)
- LSU – Tony Moss 24 pass from Tommy Hodson (Alvin Lee pass from Hodson)

== Statistics ==
Statistics	Nebraska	LSU
First downs	22	10
Rushes–yards	60–242	29–32
Passing yards	110	159
Passes	11–20–0	14–30–2
Total offense	80–352	59–191
Punts–average	4–30.5	6–42.0
Fumbles–lost	5–2	6–1
Turnovers	2	3
Penalties–yards	5–78	12–130
Time of possession	39:13	20:47

== Aftermath ==
The victory improved Nebraska to 5–0–1 all-time vs. LSU. The Cornhuskers defeated the Tigers 17–12 in the 1971 Orange Bowl (to secure the national title) and 10–7 in the 1975 season opener at Lincoln. They played to a 6–6 tie at Baton Rouge to open the 1976 season and Nebraska defeated the LSU Tigers in the 1983 Orange Bowl 21-20.

This was the final game for LSU under head coach Bill Arnsparger; he had accepted the athletic director position at conference rival Florida, announced immediately after the Tigers' regular season finale with Tulane on November 29. Arnsparger led LSU to the SEC championship this season, its first since 1970, but his minimal recruiting skills and 0–3 bowl record (two of those losses to the Cornhuskers) left many LSU fans in disfavor of him. Arnsparger departed with a 26–8–2 (.750) record and recommended his 33-year-old defensive coordinator Mike Archer as his successor.

Archer coached the next four seasons at LSU with a 27–18–1 (.598) record, but Arnsparger's lack of recruiting put him in a hole. Most of Arnsparger's best players, such as NT Henry Thomas, OG Eric Andolsek, C Nacho Albergamo, and FS Chris Carrier, were all recruited by the previous head coach, Jerry Stovall (although Arnsparger recruited QB Tommy Hodson). LSU played in bowls in the following two seasons, but then suffered through six consecutive losing seasons from 1989-94, the first two under Archer and the next four under Curley Hallman. LSU's next bowl game was the 1995 Independence Bowl under Gerry DiNardo.

LSU did not return to the Sugar Bowl (or any major bowl) until it won the SEC championship in 2001 under second-year coach Nick Saban. The Tigers then rolled over Illinois 47-34 in the 2002 Sugar Bowl behind Rohan Davey's 444 yards passing. LSU subsequently won the 2004 Sugar Bowl following the 2003 season (vs. Oklahoma to win the Bowl Championship Series national championship) and the 2007 Sugar Bowl following the 2006s season (vs. Notre Dame). Additionally, LSU has played in three national championship games at New Orleans since its most recent Sugar Bowl, defeating Ohio State in 2007, losing to Alabama in 2011 and defeating Clemson in 2019.

Nebraska continued its winning football under Tom Osborne with national championships in 1994 and 1995. They tied for another in 1997 and played for another in 2001 under Frank Solich.

The Cornhuskers have not played in the Sugar Bowl since this game. They are 3-1 in the Sugar Bowl, previously losing to Alabama in 1967 and defeating Florida in 1974, in addition to the victory over LSU in 1985. Nebraska's only game in the state of Louisiana since the 1987 Sugar Bowl was a 27-23 loss to Ole Miss in the 2002 Independence Bowl at Shreveport.
