= 1986 Alabama Crimson Tide football team =

American college football season

1986 Alabama Crimson Tide football

Sun Bowl champion

Sun Bowl, W 28–6 vs. Washington
- Conference: Southeastern Conference

Ranking
- Coaches: No. 9
- AP: No. 9
- Record: 10–3 (4–2 SEC)
- Head coach: Ray Perkins (4th season)
- Offensive coordinator: George Henshaw (4th season)
- Defensive coordinator: Joe Kines (2nd season)
- Captains: Mike Shula; Cornelius Bennett
- Home stadium: Bryant–Denny Stadium; Legion Field

1986 Southeastern Conference football standings
	Conf.					Overall
Team	W		L		T	W		L		T
No. 10 LSU $	5	–	1	–	0	9	–	3	–	0
No. 6 Auburn	4	–	2	–	0	10	–	2	–	0
No. 9 Alabama	4	–	2	–	0	10	–	3	–	0
Georgia	4	–	2	–	0	8	–	4	–	0
Ole Miss	4	–	2	–	0	8	–	3	–	1
Tennessee	3	–	3	–	0	7	–	5	–	0
Mississippi State	2	–	4	–	0	6	–	5	–	0
Kentucky	2	–	4	–	0	5	–	5	–	1
Florida	2	–	4	–	0	6	–	5	–	0
Vanderbilt	0	–	6	–	0	1	–	10	–	0
$ – Conference champion; Rankings from AP Poll

The 1986 Alabama Crimson Tide football team (variously "Alabama", "UA", "Bama" or "The Tide") represented the University of Alabama in the 1986 NCAA Division I-A football season. It was the Crimson Tide's 94th overall and 53rd season as a member of the Southeastern Conference (SEC). The team was led by head coach Ray Perkins, in his fourth year, and played their home games at both Bryant–Denny Stadium in Tuscaloosa and Legion Field in Birmingham, Alabama. They finished the season with a record of ten wins and three losses (10–3 overall, 4–2 in the SEC) and with a victory in the Sun Bowl over Washington.

After opening the season with a victory over Ohio State in the Kickoff Classic, the Crimson Tide won their first seven games and eventually rise to as high as No. 2 in the rankings but lost to eventual national champion Penn State and lost out on an SEC championship after losses to LSU and Auburn. Highlights of the season included their first ever victory over Notre Dame and a 56–28 victory over Tennessee that snapped a four-game losing streak to the Vols.

After the season, Ray Perkins resigned on December 31, to become head coach of the Tampa Bay Buccaneers of the National Football League.

== Schedule ==
Date	Time	Opponent	Rank	Site	TV	Result	Attendance	Source
August 27	7:00 p.m.	vs. No. 9 Ohio State*	No. 5	Giants Stadium; East Rutherford, NJ (Kickoff Classic)	Raycom	W 16–10	68,296	
September 6	11:30 a.m.	Vanderbilt	No. 5	Bryant–Denny Stadium; Tuscaloosa, AL	TBS	W 42–10	58,168	
September 13	1:30 p.m.	Southern Miss*	No. 4	Legion Field; Birmingham, AL		W 31–17	73,687	
September 20	12:30 p.m.	at No. 13 Florida	No. 4	Florida Field; Gainesville, FL (rivalry)		W 21–7	74,685	
October 4	2:30 p.m.	Notre Dame*	No. 2	Legion Field; Birmingham, AL	ABC	W 28–10	75,808	
October 11	1:30 p.m.	Memphis State*^{†}	No. 2	Bryant–Denny Stadium; Tuscaloosa, AL		W 37–0	60,210	
October 18	2:30 p.m.	at Tennessee	No. 2	Neyland Stadium; Knoxville, TN (Third Saturday in October)	ABC	W 56–28	95,116	
October 25	2:30 p.m.	No. 6 Penn State*	No. 2	Bryant–Denny Stadium; Tuscaloosa, AL (rivalry)	ABC	L 3–23	60,210	
November 1	11:30 a.m.	at No. 19 Mississippi State	No. 8	Scott Field; Starkville, MS (rivalry)	TBS	W 38–3	42,700	
November 8	6:45 p.m.	No. 18 LSU	No. 6	Legion Field; Birmingham, AL (rivalry)	ESPN	L 10–14	75,808	
November 15	1:30 p.m.	Temple*	No. 11	Bryant–Denny Stadium; Tuscaloosa, AL		W 24–14	60,210	
November 29	2:30 p.m.	vs. No. 14 Auburn	No. 7	Legion Field; Birmingham, AL (Iron Bowl)	ABC	L 17–21	75,808	
December 25	1:30 p.m.	vs. No. 12 Washington*	No. 13	Sun Bowl; El Paso, TX (Sun Bowl)	CBS	W 28–6	48,722	
*Non-conference game; ^{†}Homecoming; Rankings from AP Poll released prior to the game; All times are in Central time

== Rankings ==
Ranking movements Legend: ██ Increase in ranking ██ Decrease in ranking ( ) = First-place votes
	Week														
Poll	Pre	1	2	3	4	5	6	7	8	9	10	11	12	13	Final
AP	5	4	4 (1)	3	2 (1)	2 (2)	2 (2)	2 (3)	8	6 (1)	11	9	7	13	9
Coaches	6 (1)	4 (1)	4	3 (1)	2 (1)	2	2 (3)	2 (3)	8	6	15	9	7	14	9

== Game summaries ==
=== Ohio State ===
Team	1	2	3	4	Total
• Alabama	3	3	0	10	16
Ohio St	0	7	3	0	10

- Date: August 27
- Location: Giants Stadium
- Television network: Raycom Sports

=== Vanderbilt ===
Team	1	2	3	4	Total
Vanderbilt	0	0	3	7	10
• Alabama	3	11	14	14	42

- Date: September 6
- Location: Bryant-Denny Stadium
- Game attendance: 58,168
- Television network: TBS

=== At Florida ===
Team	1	2	3	4	Total
• Alabama	0	0	14	7	21
Florida	7	0	0	0	7

- Date: September 20
- Location: Florida Field
- Game attendance: 74,685

=== Memphis State ===
Team	1	2	3	4	Total
Memphis St	0	0	0	0	0
• Alabama	10	7	3	17	37

- Date: October 11
- Location: Bryant-Denny Stadium
- Game attendance: 60,210

Homecoming

=== Penn State ===
Team	1	2	3	4	Total
• Penn St	0	14	3	6	23
Alabama	3	0	0	0	3

- Date: October 25
- Location: Bryant-Denny Stadium
- Game attendance: 60,210
- Television network: ABC

=== LSU ===
Team	1	2	3	4	Total
• LSU	0	14	0	0	14
Alabama	7	0	3	0	10

- Date: November 8
- Location: Legion Field
- Game attendance: 75,808
- Television network: ESPN

=== Auburn ===
Team	1	2	3	4	Total
• Auburn	0	7	0	14	21
Alabama	7	7	3	0	17

- Date: November 29
- Location: Legion Field
- Game attendance: 75,808
- Television network: ABC

=== Vs. Washington (Sun Bowl) ===
Washington vs. Alabama

Team	1	2	3	4	Total
No. 12 Huskies	0	6	0	0	6
• No. 13 Crimson Tide	0	7	14	7	28

- Date: December 25
- Location: Sun Bowl, El Paso, TX
- Game attendance: 48,722
- Game weather: 45 °F (7 °C), Sunny, Wind NNE 4 mph (6.4 km/h)
- TV announcers (CBS): Brent Musburger, Ara Parseghian, John Dockery

== Roster ==
1986 Alabama Crimson Tide football team roster
Players
Coaches
Offense

Pos.	#	Name	Class
RB		Doug Allen
WR		Marco Battle
WR		Albert Bell
RB		John Cassimus
RB		David Casteal
OL		Bill Condon
TE	85	Howard Cross	So
RB		Kerry Goode
RB		Murry Hill
RB	26	Bobby Humphrey	So
RB		Gene Jelks
OL		David Johnson
OL		Joe King
OL		Wes Neighbors
WR		Greg Payne
WR	17	Greg Richardson	Sr
RB		Carlos Robinson
OL		Larry Rose
QB	11	Mike Shula (C)	Sr
QB		David Smith
TE		Angelo Stafford
WR		Clay Whitehurst
RB		Bo Wright

Defense

Pos.	#	Name	Class
LB	97	Cornelius Bennett (C)	Sr
LB		George Bethune
DB		Britton Cooper
DB		Vantriese Davis
LB		Wayne Davis
LB		Greg Gilbert
CB	36	Chris Goode	Jr
DL		Curt Jarvis
DB		Kermit Kendrick
DB		Freddie Robinson
LB		Randy Rockwell
DL		Derrick Slaughter
DL		Cliff Thomas
LB	55	Derrick Thomas	So
DB		Ricky Thomas

Special teams

Pos.	#	Name	Class
P	5	Chris Mohr	So
K	3	Van Tiffin	Sr

Head coach

- Ray Perkins

Coordinators/assistant coaches

Legend

- (C) Team captain
- (S) Suspended
- (I) Ineligible
- Injured
- Redshirt

== Awards and honors ==
- Cornelius Bennett: Lombardi Award, SEC Player of the Year, Unanimous First-team All-American

== 1987 NFL draft ==
Player	Position	Round	Pick	NFL club
Cornelius Bennett	Outside Linebacker	1	2	Indianapolis Colts
Freddie Robinson	Defensive back	6	142	Indianapolis Colts
Greg Richardson	Wide receiver	6	156	Minnesota Vikings
Curt Jarvis	Defensive tackle	7	169	Tampa Bay Buccaneers
Wayne Davis	Linebacker	9	229	St. Louis Cardinals
Wes Neighbors	Center	9	231	Houston Oilers
Chris Goode	Defensive back	10	253	Indianapolis Colts
Mike Shula	Quarterback	12	313	Tampa Bay Buccaneers
