= 1986 Vanderbilt Commodores football team =

American college football season

1986 Vanderbilt Commodores football
- Conference: Southeastern Conference
- Record: 1–10 (0–6 SEC)
- Head coach: Watson Brown (1st season)
- Defensive coordinator: Dick Hopkins (1st season)
- Home stadium: Vanderbilt Stadium

1986 Southeastern Conference football standings
	Conf.					Overall
Team	W		L		T	W		L		T
No. 10 LSU $	5	–	1	–	0	9	–	3	–	0
No. 6 Auburn	4	–	2	–	0	10	–	2	–	0
No. 9 Alabama	4	–	2	–	0	10	–	3	–	0
Georgia	4	–	2	–	0	8	–	4	–	0
Ole Miss	4	–	2	–	0	8	–	3	–	1
Tennessee	3	–	3	–	0	7	–	5	–	0
Mississippi State	2	–	4	–	0	6	–	5	–	0
Kentucky	2	–	4	–	0	5	–	5	–	1
Florida	2	–	4	–	0	6	–	5	–	0
Vanderbilt	0	–	6	–	0	1	–	10	–	0
$ – Conference champion; Rankings from AP Poll

The 1986 Vanderbilt Commodores football team represented Vanderbilt University in the 1986 NCAA Division I-A football season as a member of the Southeastern Conference (SEC). The Commodores were led by head coach Watson Brown in his first season and finished with a record of one win and ten losses (1–10 overall, 0–6 in the SEC).

== Schedule ==
Date	Time	Opponent	Site	TV	Result	Attendance	Source
September 6	11:30 a.m.	at No. 5 Alabama	Bryant–Denny Stadium; Tuscaloosa, AL	TBS	L 10–42	58,168	
September 13		at Maryland*	Byrd Stadium; College Park, MD		L 21–35	45,275	
September 20		Tulane*	Vanderbilt Stadium; Nashville, TN		L 17–35	40,155	
October 4		Duke*	Vanderbilt Stadium; Nashville, TN		W 24–18	38,874	
October 11		No. 7 Auburn	Vanderbilt Stadium; Nashville, TN	TBS	L 9–31	40,378	
October 18		at Georgia	Sanford Stadium; Athens, GA (rivalry)	TBS	L 16–38	78,642	
October 25	1:00 p.m.	Ole Miss	Vanderbilt Stadium; Nashville, TN (rivalry)		L 12–28	34,427	
November 1		Memphis State*	Vanderbilt Stadium; Nashville, TN		L 21–22	35,672	
November 8		at Kentucky	Commonwealth Stadium; Lexington, KY (rivalry)		L 22–34	48,230	
November 15		at Virginia Tech*	Lane Stadium; Blacksburg, VA		L 21–29	27,300	
November 29		Tennessee	Vanderbilt Stadium; Nashville, TN (rivalry)		L 20–35	41,572	
*Non-conference game; Rankings from AP Poll released prior to the game; All times are in Central time
