= 1986 Mississippi State Bulldogs football team =

American college football season

1986 Mississippi State Bulldogs football
- Conference: Southeastern Conference
- Record: 6–5 (2–4 SEC)
- Head coach: Rockey Felker (1st season)
- Offensive coordinator: David Rader (1st season)
- Defensive coordinator: Ronnie Gray (1st season)
- Home stadium: Scott Field; Mississippi Veterans Memorial Stadium

1986 Southeastern Conference football standings
	Conf.					Overall
Team	W		L		T	W		L		T
No. 10 LSU $	5	–	1	–	0	9	–	3	–	0
No. 6 Auburn	4	–	2	–	0	10	–	2	–	0
No. 9 Alabama	4	–	2	–	0	10	–	3	–	0
Georgia	4	–	2	–	0	8	–	4	–	0
Ole Miss	4	–	2	–	0	8	–	3	–	1
Tennessee	3	–	3	–	0	7	–	5	–	0
Mississippi State	2	–	4	–	0	6	–	5	–	0
Kentucky	2	–	4	–	0	5	–	5	–	1
Florida	2	–	4	–	0	6	–	5	–	0
Vanderbilt	0	–	6	–	0	1	–	10	–	0
$ – Conference champion; Rankings from AP Poll

The 1986 Mississippi State Bulldogs football team represented Mississippi State University as member of the Southeastern Conference (SEC) during the 1986 NCAA Division I-A football season. Led by first-year head coach Rockey Felker, the Bulldogs compiled a record of 6–5 with a mark of 2–4 in conference play, placing in a three-way tie for seventh in the SEC.

== Schedule ==
Date	Opponent	Rank	Site	TV	Result	Attendance	Source
September 6	at Syracuse*		Carrier Dome; Syracuse, NY		W 24–17	34,216	
September 13	at No. 8 Tennessee		Neyland Stadium; Knoxville, TN	TBS	W 27–23	89,897	
September 20	vs. Southern Miss*		Mississippi Veterans Memorial Stadium; Jackson, MS		L 24–28	50,000	
September 27	Florida		Scott Field; Starkville, MS		W 16–10	38,625	
October 4	at Memphis State*		Liberty Bowl Memorial Stadium; Memphis, TN		W 34–17	35,148	
October 11	No. 2 (I-AA) Arkansas State*	No. 19	Scott Field; Starkville, MS		W 24–9	33,500	
October 18	at Tulane*	No. 13	Louisiana Superdome; New Orleans, LA		W 34–27	47,263	
October 25	No. 7 Auburn	No. 13	Scott Field; Starkville, MS	ESPN	L 6–35	42,700	
November 1	No. 8 Alabama	No. 19	Scott Field; Starkville, MS (rivalry)	TBS	L 3–38	42,700	
November 15	No. 12 LSU		Mississippi Veterans Memorial Stadium; Jackson, MS (rivalry)	TigerVision	L 0–47	48,000	
November 22	vs. Ole Miss		Mississippi Veterans Memorial Stadium; Jackson, MS (Egg Bowl)	TBS	L 3–24	44,500	
*Non-conference game; Rankings from AP Poll released prior to the game
