= 1986 Nebraska Cornhuskers football team =

American college football season

1986 Nebraska Cornhuskers football

Sugar Bowl champion

Sugar Bowl, W 30–15 vs. LSU
- Conference: Big Eight Conference

Ranking
- Coaches: No. 4
- AP: No. 5
- Record: 10–2 (5–2 Big 8)
- Head coach: Tom Osborne (14th season)
- Offensive scheme: I formation
- Defensive coordinator: Charlie McBride (6th season)
- Base defense: 5–2
- Home stadium: Memorial Stadium

1986 Big Eight Conference football standings
	Conf.					Overall
Team	W		L		T	W		L		T
No. 3 Oklahoma $	7	–	0	–	0	11	–	1	–	0
Colorado	6	–	1	–	0	6	–	6	–	0
No. 5 Nebraska	5	–	2	–	0	10	–	2	–	0
Oklahoma State	4	–	3	–	0	6	–	5	–	0
Iowa State	3	–	4	–	0	6	–	5	–	0
Missouri	2	–	5	–	0	3	–	8	–	0
Kansas State	1	–	6	–	0	2	–	9	–	0
Kansas	0	–	7	–	0	3	–	8	–	0
$ – Conference champion; Rankings from AP Poll

The 1986 Nebraska Cornhuskers football team represented the University of Nebraska–Lincoln in the 1986 NCAA Division I-A football season. The team was coached by Tom Osborne and played their home games in Memorial Stadium in Lincoln, Nebraska.

== Schedule ==
Date	Time	Opponent	Rank	Site	TV	Result	Attendance	Source
September 6	7:00 pm	No. 11 Florida State*	No. 8	Memorial Stadium; Lincoln, NE	ABC	W 34–17	75,865	
September 20	6:00 pm	at Illinois*	No. 6	Memorial Stadium; Champaign, IL	WTBS	W 59–14	75,869	
September 27	1:30 pm	Oregon*	No. 4	Memorial Stadium; Lincoln, NE		W 48–14	76,185	
October 4	12:30 pm	at South Carolina*	No. 3	Williams–Brice Stadium; Columbia, SC		W 27–24	73,109	
October 11	6:45 pm	Oklahoma State^{†}	No. 3	Memorial Stadium; Lincoln, NE	ESPN	W 30–10	76,041	
October 18	1:30 pm	Missouri	No. 3	Memorial Stadium; Lincoln, NE (rivalry)		W 48–17	76,005	
October 25	2:30 pm	at Colorado	No. 3	Folsom Field; Boulder, CO (rivalry)		L 10–20	52,440	
November 1	1:30 pm	Kansas State	No. 9	Memorial Stadium; Lincoln, NE (rivalry)		W 38–0	75,893	
November 8	11:30 am	at Iowa State	No. 7	Cyclone Stadium; Ames, IA (rivalry)	Raycom	W 35–14	48,007	
November 15	1:30 pm	at Kansas	No. 6	Memorial Stadium; Lawrence, KS (rivalry)		W 70–0	48,800	
November 22	2:30 pm	No. 3 Oklahoma	No. 5	Memorial Stadium; Lincoln, NE (rivalry)	ABC	L 17–20	76,198	
January 1, 1987	2:30 pm	vs. No. 5 LSU*	No. 6	Louisiana Superdome; New Orleans, LA (Sugar Bowl)	ABC	W 30–15	76,234	
*Non-conference game; ^{†}Homecoming; Rankings from AP Poll released prior to the game; All times are in Central time

== Roster and coaching staff ==
1986 Nebraska Cornhuskers football team roster
Players
Coaches
Offense

Pos.	#	Name	Class
G	68	Dan Bailey	Jr
TE	87	Tom Banderas	Jr
WB	18	Vance Behrens	Jr
WB	21	Richard Bell	So
QB	12	Clete Blakeman	Jr
WB	33	Dana Brinson	So
FB	24	Dan Casterline	Sr
C	54	Mark Cooper	Sr
FB		Doug Dalton	Jr
TE	81	Mark Diaz	Sr
IB	22	Doug DuBose	Sr
OT	77	Jim Ernest	So
G	67	Ron Galois	Sr
SE	86	Jason Gamble	So
WB	8	Pernell Gatson	Sr
OT	73	Derrick Green	Jr
TE	84	Mike Hall	Jr
SE	82	Hendley Hawkins	Jr
FB	48	Micah Heibel	Jr
G	75	Mike Hoefler	Sr
WB	27	Jim Holscher	Jr
OT	70	Corey Bill Hudson	Jr
OT	64	Brad Johnson	Sr
IB	6	Keith Jones	Jr
FB	49	Ken Kaelin	Sr
G	65	Andy Keeler	So
IB	40	Jon Kelley	Jr
IB	34	Tyreese Knox	So
FB	41	Tom Lenneman	Jr
OT	57	Keven Lightner	Jr
OT	72	Rob Maggard	Sr
G	61	John McCormick	Jr
TE	43	Todd Millikan	So
QB	16	Jerry Mlinar	Sr
WB	4	Ray Nelson	Sr
C	63	John Nichols	Jr
OT	74	Stan Parker	Sr
IB	20	Terry Rodgers	Fr
SE	85	Robb Schnitzler	Sr
C	53	Jeff Sellentin	Sr
WB	2	Von Sheppard	Jr
OT	62	Bob Sledge	So
SE	88	Rod Smith	Jr
QB	9	Steve Taylor	So
OT	69	Tom Welter	Sr
IB	25	Jeff Wheeler	So
QB	15	Wendell Wooten	So
C	68	Jake Young	Fr

Defense

Pos.	#	Name	Class
S	23	Mark Blazek	Jr
MG	58	Dave Bryan	Sr
CB	42	Mike Carl	Sr
S	45	Chris Carr	Sr
CB	31	Gene Chealey	Jr
CB	7	McCathorn Clayton	Jr
CB	28	John Custard	So
CB	32	Brian Davis	Sr
LB	47	LeRoy Etienne	So
LB	38	Steve Forch	Sr
CB	10	Charles Fryar	So
DT	84	Willie Griffin	So
DT	52	Danny Groskurth	Jr
LB	39	Blake Henning	Jr
CB	8	Lorenzo Hicks	So
DE	91	Tony Holloway	Sr
DE	80	Jeff Jamrog	Jr
DE	55	Randall Jobman	So
DT	98	Lee Jones	Jr
DE	93	Jon Marco	So
CB	17	Cleo Miller	Sr
LB	41	Marc Munford	Sr
MG	95	Danny Noonan	Sr
DE	94	Bump Novacek	So
DE	90	Harlan Opie	Jr
DT	97	Tony Palmer	Jr
LB	35	Kevin Parsons	Sr
MG	96	Lawrence Pete	So
MG	92	Sean Putnam	So
DT	78	Tim Rother	Jr
CB	26	Marvin Sanders	So
MON	3	Gary Schneider	Sr
LB	51	Pat Shaw	Sr
S	19	Bryan Siebler	Sr
DT	66	Kurt Skradis	So
DT	99	Neil Smith	Jr
DT	76	Chris Spachman	Sr
S	29	Dan Thayer	Sr
MON	11	Jeff Tomjack	Jr
DE	89	Broderick Thomas	So
DE	83	Brad Tyrer	Sr
LB	37	Doug Welniak	Jr
LB	24	Dante Wiley	So
MON	5	Brian Washington	Jr

Special teams

Pos.	#	Name	Class
PK	44	Gregg Barrios	Fr
PK	44	Chris Drennan	So
PK	1	Dale Klein	Sr
P	45	John Kroeker	So
P/PK	13	Craig Schnitzler	Jr
P	14	Jim Toner	So

Head coach

- Tom Osborne
  14th season
  23rd year at Nebraska
  Alma mater: Nebraska

Coordinators/assistant coaches

- Charlie McBride
  6th season as DC/DL coach
  10th year at Nebraska
  Alma mater: Colorado
- John Melton
  14th season as LB coach
  25th year at Nebraska
  Alma mater: Wyoming
- Boyd Epley
  18th season as S&C coach
  18th year at Nebraska
  Alma mater: Nebraska
- George Darlington
  DB coach
  14th year at Nebraska
  Alma mater: Rutgers
- Milt Tenopir
  13th season as OL coach
  13th year at Nebraska
  Alma mater: Sterling
- Gene Huey
  10th season as WR coach
  10th year at Nebraska
  Alma mater: Wyoming
- Frank Solich
  4th season as RB coach
  8th year at Nebraska
  Alma mater: Nebraska
- Jack Pierce
  8th year at Nebraska
- Dan Young
  4th season as OL/K coach
  4th year at Nebraska
  Alma mater: Reed
- Tony Samuel
  1st season as OLB coach
  1st year at Nebraska
  Alma mater: Nebraska

Legend

- (C) Team captain
- (S) Suspended
- (I) Ineligible
- Injured
- Redshirt

Roster
Last update: 2011-01-17

=== Depth chart ===
Defense

FS
Bryan Siebler
Mark Blazek
Chris Carr

INSDIE	INSDIE
Marc Munford	Kevin Parsons
LeRoy Etienne	Blake Henning
Doug Welniak	Dante Wiley

MONSTER BACK
Jeff Tomjack
Brian Washington
Gary Schneider

CB
Charles Fryar
Cleo Miller
Jon Custard

DE	DT	NT	DT	DE
Tony Holloway	Chris Spachman	Danny Noonan	Neil Smith	Broderick Thomas
Jeff Jamrog	Tim Rother	Lawrence Pete	Lee Jones	Brad Tyrer
Jon Marco	Danny Groskurth	Sean Putnam	⋅	Steve Stanard

CB
Brian Davis
Lorenzo Hicks
Marvin Sanders

Offense

SE
Robb Schnitzler
Rod Smith
Jason Gamble

LT	LG	C	RG	RT
Rob Maggard	Stan Parker	Mark Cooper	John McCormick	Tom Welter
Keven Lightner	Mike Hoefler	Jeff Sellentin	Ron Galois	Brad Johnson
Bob Sledge	Jake Young	John Nichols	Andy Keeler	Corey B Hudson

TE
Todd Millikan
Tom Banderas
Willie Griffin
Mark Diaz

WB
Dana Brinson
Von Sheppard
Pernell Gatson

QB
Steve Taylor
Clete Blakeman
McCathorn Clayton

RB
Keith Jones
Tyreese Knox
Terry Rodgers

FB
Ken Kaelin
Micah Heibel
Doug Dalton

Special teams
PK Dale Klein
P John Kroeker

== Game summaries ==
=== Florida State ===
Florida State at Nebraska [box score]

Team	1	2	3	4	Total
Florida State	7	7	3	0	17
• Nebraska	0	10	14	10	34

- Date: 1986-09-06
- Location: Memorial Stadium, Lincoln, Nebraska
- Game attendance: 75,865

This was the first ever night game at Memorial Stadium. Nebraska's loss to FSU in Lincoln the previous year was avenged when the Cornhuskers came back from a halftime deficit, outscoring FSU 24–3 and holding the Seminoles to −2 yards in the second half.

=== Illinois ===
Nebraska at Illinois [box score]

Team	1	2	3	4	Total
• Nebraska	28	10	14	7	59
Illinois	0	7	0	7	14

- Date: 1986-09-20
- Location: Memorial Stadium, Champaign, Illinois
- Game attendance: 75,865

The outcome of this game was more or less sealed from the very first play, as Illinois QB Chris Lamb threw an interception that Cornhusker CB Brian Davis returned for a touchdown, and Nebraska never looked back.

=== Oregon ===
Oregon at Nebraska [box score]

Team	1	2	3	4	Total
Oregon	7	0	0	7	14
• Nebraska	14	21	13	0	48

- Date: 1986-09-27
- Location: Memorial Stadium, Lincoln, Nebraska
- Game attendance: 76,185

Oregon made the first strike, but Nebraska then ran away from the Ducks, scoring 48 unanswered points, though the Cornhuskers suffered the loss of WB Von Sheppard to injury and saw PK Dale Klein's consecutive PATs streak ended at 60.

=== South Carolina ===
Nebraska at South Carolina [box score]

Team	1	2	3	4	Total
• Nebraska	10	3	0	14	27
South Carolina	0	7	3	14	24

- Date: 1986-10-04
- Location: Williams–Brice Stadium, Columbia, South Carolina
- Game attendance: 73,109

Nebraska survived a scare in Columbia, escaping with a victory due to recovering a Gamecock fumble with two minutes left to play to set up the go-ahead touchdown, and then intercepting a throw by South Carolina QB Todd Ellis at NU's 10 yard line with just 10 seconds remaining.

=== Oklahoma State ===
Oklahoma State at Nebraska [box score]

Team	1	2	3	4	Total
Oklahoma State	0	10	0	0	10
• Nebraska	14	7	9	0	30

- Date: 1986-10-11
- Location: Memorial Stadium, Lincoln, Nebraska
- Game attendance: 76,041

Nebraska continued their string of domination over Oklahoma State in the second ever night game at Memorial Stadium, extending their win streak over the Cowboys to 25.

=== Missouri ===
Missouri at Nebraska [box score]

Team	1	2	3	4	Total
Missouri	3	0	0	14	17
• Nebraska	0	20	21	7	48

- Date: 1986-10-18
- Location: Memorial Stadium, Lincoln, Nebraska
- Game attendance: 76,005

Missouri scored first on a 29-yard field goal, but Nebraska owned the show for the rest of the game, scoring six straight touchdowns on their way to the win. Nebraska PK Dave Klein beat the Cornhusker career FG record of 22 when he extended his total to 24 in this game.

=== Colorado ===
Nebraska at Colorado [box score]

Team	1	2	3	4	Total
Nebraska	0	0	7	3	10
• Colorado	7	3	0	10	20

- Date: 1986-10-25
- Location: Folsom Field, Boulder, Colorado
- Game attendance: 52,440

Unranked Colorado stunned the #3 Cornhuskers, holding Nebraska to its lowest rushing yard total in eight years and ending Nebraska's 18-year winning streak against the Buffaloes.

=== Kansas State ===
Kansas State at Nebraska [box score]

Team	1	2	3	4	Total
Kansas State	0	0	0	0	0
• Nebraska	17	0	14	7	38

- Date: 1986-11-01
- Location: Memorial Stadium, Lincoln, Nebraska
- Game attendance: 75,893

The hapless Wildcats suffered Nebraska's wrath following their loss to unranked Colorado the week prior, as the Cornhuskers romped in the snow at Memorial Stadium and shut out Kansas State while allowing them just 106 total yards of offense.

=== Iowa State ===
Nebraska at Iowa State [box score]

Team	1	2	3	4	Total
• Nebraska	7	0	14	14	35
Iowa State	0	14	0	0	14

- Date: 1986-11-08
- Location: Cyclone Stadium, Ames, Iowa
- Game attendance: 48,007

Nebraska struck first but then seemed to flame out, as Iowa State sent the Cornhuskers to the locker room behind 14–7 at halftime. After a rousing pep talk from Coach Osborne, the Cornhuskers stormed back in the 2nd half for the win.

=== Kansas ===
Nebraska at Kansas [box score]

Team	1	2	3	4	Total
• Nebraska	21	14	21	14	70
Kansas	0	0	0	0	0

- Date: 1986-11-15
- Location: Memorial Stadium, Lawrence, Kansas
- Game attendance: 48,800

Nebraska absolutely crushed Kansas in Lawrence, handing the Jayhawks their worst-ever loss and posting the biggest Cornhusker shutout since a 100–0 smashing of Nebraska Wesleyan in 1917.

=== Oklahoma ===
Oklahoma at Nebraska [box score]

Team	1	2	3	4	Total
• Oklahoma	7	0	0	13	20
Nebraska	7	3	7	0	17

- Date: 1986-11-22
- Location: Memorial Stadium, Lincoln, Nebraska
- Game attendance: 76,198

The #5 Cornhuskers, flying high after their 70–0 shutout against Kansas the previous week, looked ready to upset the #3 Sooners, but it was not to be. Oklahoma found the end zone twice in the 4th quarter to tie the game, and forced a Nebraska punt with 1:22 remaining. After grinding back down the field, and with just 9 seconds remaining, Oklahoma PK Tim Lashar made a 31-yard kick to split the uprights for the win, handing the Sooners their 2nd consecutive Big 8 Championship title.

=== LSU ===
Nebraska vs LSU [box score]

Team	1	2	3	4	Total
• Nebraska	0	10	7	13	30
LSU	7	0	0	8	15

- Date: 1987-01-01
- Location: Louisiana Superdome, New Orleans, Louisiana
- Game start: 2:40 p.m. CST
- Game attendance: 76,234

Nebraska's 25th bowl appearance saw the Blackshirts setting two new bowl-game records by holding LSU to just 32 net rushing yards and 10 first downs as the #6 Cornhuskers rolled up the win over the #5 Tigers.

== Rankings ==
Ranking movements Legend: ██ Increase in ranking ██ Decrease in ranking
	Week														
Poll	Pre	1	2	3	4	5	6	7	8	9	10	11	12	13	Final
AP	8	6	6	4	3	3	3	3	9	7	6	5	6	6	5
Coaches															4

== Awards ==
Award	Name(s)
All-America 1st team	Danny Noonan
All-America 3rd team	Tom Welter
All-America honorable mention	Broderick Thomas, Keith Jones, Rob Maggard, John McCormick, Marc Munford, Stan Parker, Chris Spachman
Sophomore All-America 1st team	Broderick Thomas
Sophomore All-America honorable mention	LeRoy Etienne
Big 8 Athlete of the Year	Danny Noonan
All-Big 8 1st team	Keith Jones, Danny Noonan, Broderick Thomas, Tom Welter, Marc Munford
All-Big 8 2nd team	John McCormick, Brian Davis, Rob Maggard, Todd Millikan, Stan Parker, Rod Smith

== NFL and pro players ==
The following Nebraska players who participated in the 1986 season later moved on to the next level and joined a professional or semi-pro team as draftees or free agents.

Name	Team
Richard Bell	Pittsburgh Steelers
Dana Brinson	San Diego Chargers
Brian Davis	Washington Redskins
Doug DuBose	San Francisco 49ers
LeRoy Etienne	San Francisco 49ers
Keith Jones	Cleveland Browns
Marc Munford	Denver Broncos
Danny Noonan	Dallas Cowboys
Lawrence Pete	Detroit Lions
Tim Rother	Los Angeles Raiders
Von Sheppard	Coventry Jets
Neil Smith	Kansas City Chiefs
Steve Taylor	Edmonton Eskimos
Broderick Thomas	Tampa Bay Buccaneers
Brian Washington	Cleveland Browns
Tom Welter	St. Louis Cardinals
