= Steve Taylor (Canadian football) =

American gridiron football player (born 1967)

Profile
- Position: Quarterback

Personal information
- Born: January 7, 1967 (age 59); Fresno, California, U.S.
- Listed height: 6 ft 0 in (1.83 m)
- Listed weight: 205 lb (93 kg)

Career information
- High school: Lincoln (San Diego, California)
- College: Nebraska
- NFL draft: 1989: 12th round, 323rd overall pick

Career history
- 1989–1990: Edmonton Eskimos
- 1991–1994: Calgary Stampeders
- 1995: Hamilton Tiger-Cats
- 1996: Ottawa Rough Riders

Awards and highlights
- Grey Cup champion (1992); Third-team All-American (1987); 2× First-team All-Big Eight (1987, 1988)

Career CFL statistics
- Passing stats: 366-of-652 passing attempts 4,947 yards
- TDs-Ints: 35–26

Steve Taylor (born January 7, 1967) is an American former professional football player who was a quarterback in the Canadian Football League (CFL). Taylor had signed a four-year contract with the Edmonton Eskimos just one month after finishing his senior season of college football for the Nebraska Cornhuskers. The dual-threat quarterback was selected in the 12th round of the 1989 NFL draft by the Indianapolis Colts in April, but Taylor was already committed to playing in the CFL.

Starting in the summer of 1989, Taylor played for four CFL teams: the Eskimos, Calgary Stampeders, Hamilton Tiger-Cats, and Ottawa Rough Riders. He spent his entire career of eight seasons as a backup, playing behind notable CFL starters such as Tracy Ham and Doug Flutie. Taylor's career passing statistics included 4,947 yards passing with 35 touchdowns and 26 interceptions. He completed 366-of-652 pass attempts during his CFL career.

== College career ==
Taylor's college football career at the University of Nebraska–Lincoln was quite different. The 6-foot (1.83 m), 205-pound (93 kg) option quarterback was the perfect fit for head coach Tom Osborne's vaunted option offense. He was 31–6 (.838) as a three-year starter (1986–88), with a Big 8 title in his senior season. His backup was current NFL referee, Clete Blakeman.

As a true freshman in 1985, Taylor came off the bench to help Nebraska come back and nearly defeat Michigan in the Fiesta Bowl—a game the Wolverines won 27–23. As a sophomore in 1986, he was the player of the game in the Sugar Bowl and the Huskers finished at 10–2, ranked fifth in the final AP poll.

Taylor passed for 2,815 yards and rushed for 2,125 yards in a tailback predicated option offense that featured such excellent Cornhuskers running backs as Keith "End Zone" Jones, Doug DuBose, Tom Rathman, and Ken Clark. He recorded 32 rushing touchdowns and 30 touchdown passes. His best single season came as a senior in 1988 when he rushed 157 times for 826 yards and completed 72-of-151 passing attempts for 1,067 yards with 11 touchdowns and seven interceptions. He had 13 rushing touchdowns with a longest run of 60 yards as the Huskers were 11–1 in the regular season, but lost the Orange Bowl and finished tenth in the AP poll.

One of Taylor's most memorable games was in 1987 on September 12, in a 42–33 win over third-ranked UCLA, led by talented quarterback Troy Aikman. Taylor threw for a school record five touchdown passes including a 48-yard scoring toss to wide receiver Rod Smith and two approximate 35-yard touchdown passes to tight end Todd Millikan. Taylor was 10-of-15 passing for 217 yards without an interception and had 12 rushes for 27 yards. He was named a third-team All-American by the Associated Press that season.

Another such moment came in 1988 when Nebraska met Oklahoma State, with famous running back Barry Sanders, on October 15 in Lincoln; Nebraska outscored the tenth-ranked Cowboys 63–42, a team that went 10–2 that season. Taylor overcame Sanders' 189-yard rushing performance with a solid performance of his own that included the Husker signal caller rushing for 140 yards on eleven carries while completing 6-of-11 passes for 92 yards. Taylor threw an 11-yard touchdown pass and scored on rushes of 60, 43, and nine yards in a game that included over 1,000 yards of combined total offense.

=== Statistics ===
	Passing						Rushing			
SEASON	CMP	ATT	CMP%	YDS	TD	INT	ATT	YDS	AVG	TD
1985	3	6	50.0	38	0	1	14	103	7.4	2
1986	52	124	41.9	808	6	7	130	537	4.1	9
1987	57	123	46.3	902	13	9	130	659	5.1	8
1988	72	151	47.7	1,067	11	7	157	826	5.3	13
Totals	184	404	45.5	2,815	30	25	431	2,125	4.9	32

== Personal life ==
Taylor is now a real estate sales associate with Lincoln First Realty in Lincoln, Nebraska, where he, his wife, and their three daughters currently reside.
