= 1986 Hall of Fame Bowl =

- Inaugural Hall of Fame Bowl
Boston College Eagles	Georgia Bulldogs
(8–3)	(8–3)
Independent	SEC
27	24
Head coach: Jack Bicknell	Head coach: Vince Dooley
	AP / Coaches; NR / 17
	1	2	3	4	Total
Boston College	3	17	0	7	27
Georgia	7	0	10	7	24
- Date: December 23, 1986
- Season: 1986
- Stadium: Tampa Stadium
- Location: Tampa, Florida
- Referee: Gil Marchman (Big Ten)
- Attendance: 25,368

United States TV coverage
- Network: Mizlou
- Announcers: Howard David- Play by Play, Lee Corso and Bob Casciola- Color Commentators

The 1986 Hall of Fame Bowl was a college football bowl game featuring the Boston College Eagles and the Georgia Bulldogs. It was the inaugural edition of the Hall of Fame Bowl.

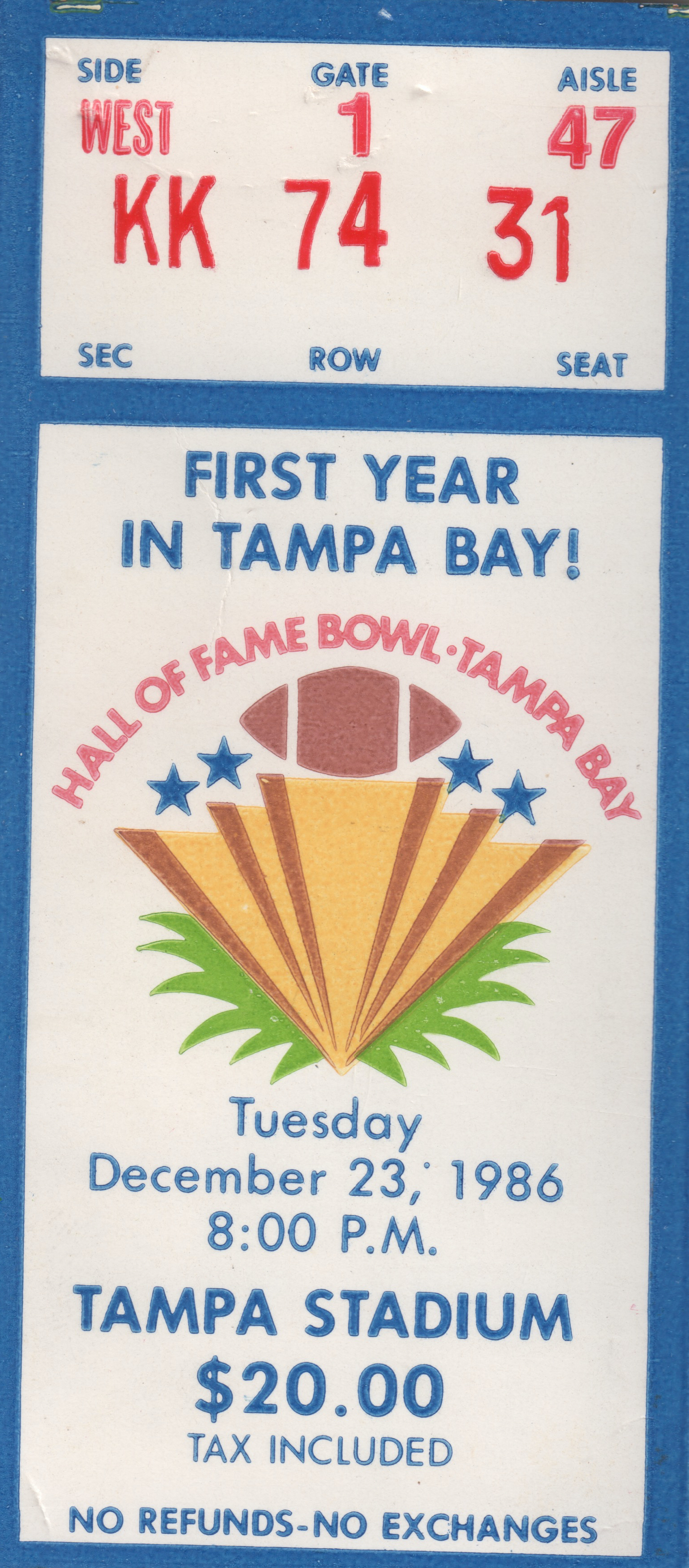

Georgia started the scoring on a 7-yard James Jackson run. Boston College got on the board after Lowe made a 23-yard field goal at 7–3. In the second quarter, quarterback Shawn Halloran threw a 4-yard touchdown strike to Peter Casparriello giving BC a 10–7 lead. Troy Stradford scored on a 1-yard touchdown run, and Lowe added a 37-yard field goal for Boston College to take a 20–7 halftime lead.

In the third quarter, Georgia scored on a 28-yard field goal by Jacobs. With Boston College driving, Gary Moss returned an interception 81 yards for a touchdown, and Georgia was within 20–17. In the fourth quarter, James Jackson scored on a 5-yard touchdown run as Georgia took a 24–20 lead. Shawn Halloran's 5-yard touchdown pass to Kelvin Martin with no time left gave Boston College a 27–24 win.
