= 1986 Liberty Bowl =

- 28th Liberty Bowl
Minnesota Golden Gophers	Tennessee Volunteers
(6–5)	(6–5)
Big Ten	SEC
14	21
Head coach: John Gutekunst	Head coach: Johnny Majors
	1	2	3	4	Total
Minnesota	0	3	8	3	14
Tennessee	7	7	0	7	21
- Date: December 29, 1986
- Season: 1986
- Stadium: Liberty Bowl Memorial Stadium
- Location: Memphis, Tennessee
- MVP: QB Jeff Francis (Tennessee)
- Referee: C.C. Dailey (ACC)
- Attendance: 51,327

United States TV coverage
- Network: Raycom
- Announcers: Merle Harmon and Kevin Kiley

The 1986 Liberty Bowl was a college football postseason bowl game played on December 29, 1986, in Memphis, Tennessee. The 28th edition of the Liberty Bowl, the game featured the Minnesota Golden Gophers and the Tennessee Volunteers.

== Background ==
The Golden Gophers were making their second straight bowl appearance, the first time they had gone to bowl games in consecutive appearances since 1961–62. One highlight in the season was beating #2 ranked Michigan in Ann Arbor. This was their first ever appearance in the Liberty Bowl. As for Tennessee, though they did not repeat as SEC champions like they did the previous season, the Volunteers won four straight games to overcome a 2–5 start, finishing 6th in the SEC. This was their six straight bowl appearance and first Liberty Bowl appearance since 1974.

== Game summary ==
Joey Clinkscales caught an 18 yard touchdown pass from Jeff Francis to give Tennessee a 7–0 lead. Fullback William Howard caught a 23 yard pass from Francis to make it 14–0. Chip Lohmiller made it 14–3 on his 27 yard field goal. In the second half, Ricky Foggie scored on an 11 yard touchdown run. Fullback Darrell Thompson scored on the conversion attempt to make it 14–11. Lohmiller added another field goal to tie the game at 14 with 13:23 left in the fourth quarter. But the Vols went on a five-play, 66-yard drive that culminated with a Clinkscales catch from 15 yards out to give them a 21–14 lead with 11:21 left that sealed the victory as the Gophers failed to respond from there. Francis went 22 of 31 for 243 yards, and he was named MVP. Clinkscales had seven catches for 72 yards. For the Golden Gophers, Foggie went 10 of 25 for 136 yards.

== Statistics ==
Statistics	Minnesota	Tennessee
First downs	20	17
Rushing yards	238	81
Passing yards	136	243
Total yards	374	324
Kickoff return yards	44	69
Punt return yards	11	(−1)
Penalties–yards	5–30	5–49
Fumbles–lost	2–2	4–1

== Aftermath ==
Neither team has appeared in the Liberty Bowl since this game.

Minnesota wouldn't play in a bowl game again until the1999 sun bowl.

A final interesting anecdote was the performance of “God bless the USA” by Lee Greenwood at halftime. In the second verse, the song acknowledges the lakes of Minnesota and the hills of Tennessee.
