= Chris McLemore =

American football player (born 1963)

No. 36, 20
- Position: Running back

Personal information
- Born: December 31, 1963 (age 62); Las Vegas, Nevada, U.S.
- Listed height: 6 ft 1 in (1.85 m)
- Listed weight: 232 lb (105 kg)

Career information
- High school: Winchester (NV) Valley
- College: Colorado; Arizona
- NFL draft: 1987: 11th round, 288th overall pick

Career history
- Indianapolis Colts (1987); Los Angeles Raiders (1987–1988); Seattle Seahawks (1989–1990)*; (1991)*; New York/New Jersey Knights (1992); Atlanta Falcons (1992)*
- * Offseason or practice squad member only

Career NFL statistics
- Rushing yards: 58
- Rushing average: 3.4
- Receptions: 2
- Receiving yards: 9
- Stats at Pro Football Reference

Chris McLemore (born December 31, 1963) is an American former professional football player who was a running back in the National Football League (NFL). He played college football for the Colorado Buffaloes and Arizona Wildcats. He was selected by the Los Angeles Raiders in the 11th round of the 1987 NFL draft with the 288th overall pick. He played for the Indianapolis Colts in 1987 and for the Los Angeles Raiders from 1987 to 1988.
