= 1987 Florida Citrus Bowl =

American college football game

Auburn Tigers	USC Trojans
(9–2)	(7–4)
SEC	Pac-10
16	7
Head coach: Pat Dye	Head coach: Ted Tollner
AP / Coaches; 10 / 9
	1	2	3	4	Total
Auburn	0	14	0	2	16
USC	7	0	0	0	7
- Date: January 1, 1987
- Season: 1986
- Stadium: Florida Citrus Bowl
- Location: Orlando, Florida
- MVP: Aundray Bruce, LB, Auburn
- Referee: John McClintock (Big Eight)
- Attendance: 51,113

United States TV coverage
- Network: ABC
- Announcers: Frank Gifford (Play by Play); Lynn Swann (Color); Mike Adamle (Sideline)

The 1987 Florida Citrus Bowl was held on January 1, 1987, at the Florida Citrus Bowl in Orlando, Florida. The #10 Auburn Tigers defeated the USC Trojans by a score of 16–7.

The first score of the game came when the Trojans intercepted an Auburn pass and returned it 24 yards to take the lead. No other scoring took place in the first quarter, which ended 7–0. The second quarter saw Auburn retaliate, as the Tigers found the end zone twice (a 3-yard pass and a 4-yard run) to lead 14–7 at halftime. The third quarter saw no scoring and Auburn capped off the game with a safety in the fourth quarter, and the game ended 16–7.

Auburn finished the game with 9 more first downs, 156 more rushing yards, and 133 more total yards. However, the Trojans out-passed the Tigers by 23 yards.
