= Ted Chapman (American football) =

American football player (born 1964)

No. 77
- Position: Defensive end

Personal information
- Born: April 5, 1964 (age 62); Philadelphia, PA
- Listed height: 6 ft 3 in (1.91 m)
- Listed weight: 260 lb (118 kg)

Career information
- College: Maryland

Career history
- Washington Redskins (1987); Los Angeles Raiders (1987–1988); Atlanta Falcons (1989)

Career statistics
- Games played: 2
- Games started: 1
- Tackles: 6
- Fumble recoveries: 1
- Stats at Pro Football Reference

Edward Arthur Chapman is a former NFL player for the Washington Redskins, the Los Angeles Raiders and the Atlanta Falcons.

== Early life ==
Chapman was born on April 5, 1964, in Philadelphia, Pennsylvania. He went to Maryland as his college.

== Career ==
On May 1, 1987, Chapman was signed by the Washington Redskins, but on September 7 of that same year, He was released. On September 23, Chapman was signed by the Los Angeles Raiders. He played in 2 games and recorded one fumble with the Raiders before being put on injury reserve on October 21. in 1989, Chapman was signed by the Atlanta Falcons, but on September 4, he was released.
