= 1986 Auburn Tigers football team =

American college football season

1986 Auburn Tigers football

Florida Citrus Bowl champion

Florida Citrus Bowl, W 16–7 vs. USC
- Conference: Southeastern Conference

Ranking
- Coaches: No. 8
- AP: No. 6
- Record: 10–2 (4–2 SEC)
- Head coach: Pat Dye (6th season)
- Offensive scheme: I formation
- Defensive coordinator: Wayne Hall (1st season)
- Home stadium: Jordan–Hare Stadium

1986 Southeastern Conference football standings
	Conf.					Overall
Team	W		L		T	W		L		T
No. 10 LSU $	5	–	1	–	0	9	–	3	–	0
No. 6 Auburn	4	–	2	–	0	10	–	2	–	0
No. 9 Alabama	4	–	2	–	0	10	–	3	–	0
Georgia	4	–	2	–	0	8	–	4	–	0
Ole Miss	4	–	2	–	0	8	–	3	–	1
Tennessee	3	–	3	–	0	7	–	5	–	0
Mississippi State	2	–	4	–	0	6	–	5	–	0
Kentucky	2	–	4	–	0	5	–	5	–	1
Florida	2	–	4	–	0	6	–	5	–	0
Vanderbilt	0	–	6	–	0	1	–	10	–	0
$ – Conference champion; Rankings from AP Poll

The 1986 Auburn Tigers football team represented Auburn University in the 1986 NCAA Division I-A football season. Coached by Pat Dye, the team finished the season with a 10–2 record. Auburn snapped a two-game winning streak by Alabama in the Iron Bowl. Auburn went on to defeat USC in the Florida Citrus Bowl, 16–7.

== Schedule ==
Date	Opponent	Rank	Site	TV	Result	Attendance	Source
September 6	Chattanooga*	No. 14	Jordan-Hare Stadium; Auburn, AL		W 42–14	58,000	
September 20	East Carolina*	No. 6	Jordan-Hare Stadium; Auburn, AL		W 45–0	62,000	
September 27	Tennessee	No. 8	Jordan-Hare Stadium; Auburn, AL (rivalry)	ABC	W 34–8	72,500	
October 4	Western Carolina*	No. 7	Jordan-Hare Stadium; Auburn, AL		W 55–6	63,000	
October 11	at Vanderbilt	No. 7	Vanderbilt Stadium; Nashville, TN	TBS	W 31–9	40,378	
October 18	Georgia Tech*	No. 7	Jordan-Hare Stadium; Auburn, AL (rivalry)		W 31–10	72,500	
October 25	at No. 13 Mississippi State	No. 7	Scott Field; Starkville, MS	ESPN	W 35–6	42,700	
November 1	at Florida	No. 5	Florida Field; Gainesville, FL (rivalry)		L 17–18	74,521	
November 8	Cincinnati*^{†}	No. 9	Jordan-Hare Stadium; Auburn, AL		W 52–7	63,500	
November 15	No. 17 Georgia	No. 9	Jordan-Hare Stadium; Auburn, AL (rivalry)	ESPN	L 16–20	73,000	
November 29	vs. No. 7 Alabama	No. 14	Legion Field; Birmingham, AL (Iron Bowl)	ABC	W 21–17	75,808	
January 1	vs. USC*	No. 10	Florida Citrus Bowl; Orlando, FL (Florida Citrus Bowl)	ABC	W 16–7	51,113	
*Non-conference game; ^{†}Homecoming; Rankings from AP Poll released prior to the game

== Rankings ==
Ranking movements Legend: ██ Increase in ranking ██ Decrease in ranking
	Week														
Poll	Pre	1	2	3	4	5	6	7	8	9	10	11	12	13	Final
AP	14	9	10	8	7	7	7	7	5	9	8	15	14	10	6
Coaches	13	11	11	8	7	7	7	7	5	10	8	14	14	9	8

== Personnel ==
1986 Auburn Tigers football team roster
Players
Coaches
Offense

Pos.	#	Name	Class
RB		Tommie Agee
WR		Scott Bolton
QB		Jeff Burger
RB		Collis Campbell
OL		Yann Cowart
WR		Duke Donaldson
WR		Robert Elia
RB		Brent Fullwood
WR		Trey Gainous
RB		Vincent Harris
OL		John Hudson
RB		Tim Jessie
OL		Vincent Jones
RB		James Joseph
RB		Pound Lamb
TE		Walter Reeves
TE		Mark Rose
OL		Stacy Searels
QB		Reggie Slack
OL		Ben Tamburello
TE		Frank Thomas
OL		Jim Thompson
WR		Lawyer Tillman
RB		Reggie Ware
WR		Alexander Wright

Defense

Pos.	#	Name	Class
LB		Aundray Bruce
LB		Kurt Crain
DL		Nate Hill
DB		Arthur Johnson
DB	39	Charles Kelly
LB		Gary Kelley
DB		Shan Morris
LB		Edward Phillips
DB		Kevin Porter
DB		Chip Powell
DB		Tommy Powell
DL		Tracy Rocker
DL		Benji Roland
LB		Brian Smith
DL		Ron Stallworth

Special teams

Pos.	#	Name	Class
K		Chris Knapp
P		Brian Shulman

Head coach

- Pat Dye

Coordinators/assistant coaches

- Steve Patterson

Legend

- (C) Team captain
- (S) Suspended
- (I) Ineligible
- Injured
- Redshirt
