= Jake Hallum =

American football coach and scout (1938–2015)

Biographical details
- Born: November 2, 1938
- Died: August 6, 2015 (aged 76)

Coaching career (HC unless noted)
- 1967: Hopkinsville HS (KY)
- 1968–1971: Morehead State
- 1972–1981: Maryland (OL)
- 1982–1989: Kentucky (OL)

Head coaching record
- Overall: 22–17–1 (college)

John Jacob Hallum Jr. (November 2, 1938 – August 6, 2015) was an American football coach and scout. He served as the head football coach at Morehead State University in Morehead, Kentucky from 1968 to 1971, compiling a record of 22–17–1. After leaving Morehead State, he was an offensive line assistant under Jerry Claiborne at the University of Maryland and University of Kentucky. Following his retirement from coaching, Hallum served as a scout for New England Patriots and Cleveland Browns of the National Football League (NFL).

== Head coaching record ==
=== College ===
| Year | Team | Overall | Conference | Standing | Bowl/playoffs |
|---|---|---|---|---|---|
Morehead State Eagles (Ohio Valley Conference) (1968–1971)
| 1968 | Morehead State | 3–6–1 | 1–6 | T–7th | |
| 1969 | Morehead State | 6–4 | 3–4 | 5th | |
| 1970 | Morehead State | 6–4 | 4–3 | 4th | |
| 1971 | Morehead State | 7–3 | 4–3 | 4th | |
| Morehead State: | | 22–17–1 | 12–16 | | |
| Total: | | 22–17–1 | | | |
