= 1986 Georgia Bulldogs football team =

American college football season

1986 Georgia Bulldogs football

Hall of Fame Bowl, L 24–27 vs. Boston College
- Conference: Southeastern Conference
- Record: 8–4 (4–2 SEC)
- Head coach: Vince Dooley (23rd season)
- Offensive coordinator: George Haffner (7th season)
- Offensive scheme: I formation
- Defensive coordinator: Bill Lewis (6th season)
- Home stadium: Sanford Stadium

1986 Southeastern Conference football standings
	Conf.					Overall
Team	W		L		T	W		L		T
No. 10 LSU $	5	–	1	–	0	9	–	3	–	0
No. 6 Auburn	4	–	2	–	0	10	–	2	–	0
No. 9 Alabama	4	–	2	–	0	10	–	3	–	0
Georgia	4	–	2	–	0	8	–	4	–	0
Ole Miss	4	–	2	–	0	8	–	3	–	1
Tennessee	3	–	3	–	0	7	–	5	–	0
Mississippi State	2	–	4	–	0	6	–	5	–	0
Kentucky	2	–	4	–	0	5	–	5	–	1
Florida	2	–	4	–	0	6	–	5	–	0
Vanderbilt	0	–	6	–	0	1	–	10	–	0
$ – Conference champion; Rankings from AP Poll

The 1986 Georgia Bulldogs football team represented the University of Georgia as a member of the Southeastern Conference (SEC) during the 1986 NCAA Division I-A football season. Led by 23rd-year head coach Vince Dooley, the Bulldogs compiled an overall record of 8–4, with a mark of 4–2 in conference play, and finished tied for second in the SEC.

== Schedule ==
Date	Opponent	Rank	Site	TV	Result	Attendance	Source
September 13	Duke*	No. 19	Sanford Stadium; Athens, GA		W 31–7	80,420	
September 20	Clemson*	No. 14	Sanford Stadium; Athens, GA (rivalry)	ABC	L 28–31	81,377	
September 27	at South Carolina*		Williams–Brice Stadium; Columbia, SC (rivalry)	ESPN	W 31–26	74,200	
October 4	Ole Miss		Sanford Stadium; Athens, GA	TBS	W 14–10	80,227	
October 11	at No. 16 LSU		Tiger Stadium; Baton Rouge, LA	TigerVision	L 14–23	78,252	
October 18	Vanderbilt		Sanford Stadium; Athens, GA (rivalry)	TBS	W 38–16	78,642	
October 25	at Kentucky		Commonwealth Stadium; Lexington, KY		W 31–9	56,820	
November 1	Richmond*^{†}		Sanford Stadium; Athens, GA		W 28–13	74,785	
November 8	vs. Florida	No. 19	Gator Bowl Stadium; Jacksonville, FL (rivalry)		L 19–31	81,957	
November 15	at No. 8 Auburn		Jordan-Hare Stadium; Auburn, AL (rivalry)	ESPN	W 20–16	73,000	
November 29	Georgia Tech*	No. 18	Sanford Stadium; Athens, GA (rivalry)	TBS	W 31–24	82,122	
December 23	vs. Boston College*	No. 17	Tampa Stadium; Tampa, FL (Hall of Fame Bowl)	Mizlou	L 24–27	25,368	
*Non-conference game; ^{†}Homecoming; Rankings from AP Poll released prior to the game

== Roster ==
1986 Georgia Bulldogs football team roster
Players
Coaches
Offense

Pos.	#	Name	Class
OL	69	Mack Burroughs	Jr
WR	10	David Dukes	Jr
RB	30	Keith Henderson	So
QB	1	Joey Hester	RFr
QB	14	James Jackson	Jr
RB	45	Kevin Jackson	So
RB	47	Randy Jackson	So
QB	18	Wayne Johnson	So
RB	4	Fred Lane	Sr
WR	8	Nate Lewis	So
RB	43	David McCluskey	Sr
WR	24	Cassius Osborn	Jr
OL	77	Victor Perry	Sr
TE	87	Troy Sadowski	So
OL	68	Kim Stephens	Jr
OL	79	Wilbur Strozier	Sr
RB	32	Lars Tate	Jr
WR	9	John Thomas	So
QB	11	Todd Wade	Jr
TE	83	Kirk Warner	RFr
OL	63	Todd Wheeler	So
QB	15	Todd Williams	Sr
RB	38	Tim Worley	So

Defense

Pos.	#	Name	Class
LB	44	Steve Boswell	Sr
LB	42	John Brantley	Jr
DL	72	Larry Brown	Jr
DB	49	Mike Brown	Jr
DL	28	Aaron Chubb	So
DL	91	Andy Dotson	RFr
DL	97	Paul Giles	So
DL	95	Bill Goldberg	RFr
DE	84	Mike Guthrie	So
DL	52	Henry Harris	Sr
DB	29	Will Jones	Jr
DB	19	John Little	Sr
DE	94	Wycliffe Lovelace	Jr
DL	99	Tyrone McClendon
CB	3	Gary Moss	Sr
LB	86	Calvin Ruff	Sr
WR	2	Patrick Sulley	Jr
DE	92	Richard Tardits	So
LB	60	Terrie Webster	So
DB	23	Greg Williams	Jr

Special teams

Pos.	#	Name	Class
P		Cris Carpenter
PK		Steve Crumley
PK		John Kasay

Head coach

- Vince Dooley

Coordinators/assistant coaches

- Mike Castronis
- Dicky Clark
- Bob Davis
- Ray Goff
- Steve Greer
- George Haffner (AHC/OC)
- Bill Hartman
- Joe Hollis
- Bill Lewis (DC)
- Paul Messer
- Doug Quinn
- Ray Sherman
- Tommy Spangler
- Dale Strahm
- Joe Tereshinski
- Charles Whittemore
- Scott Woodall
- Ron Wright

Legend

- (C) Team captain
- (S) Suspended
- (I) Ineligible
- Injured
- Redshirt
