= Tony Mayes =

American football player (born 1964)

No. 27
- Position: Defensive back

Personal information
- Born: May 19, 1964 (age 62); Tazewell, Tennessee, U.S.
- Listed height: 6 ft 0 in (1.83 m)
- Listed weight: 200 lb (91 kg)

Career information
- High school: Paintsville (KY)
- College: Kentucky
- NFL draft: 1987: 5th round, 137th overall pick

Career history
- Tampa Bay Buccaneers (1987)*; St. Louis Cardinals (1987); Green Bay Packers (1988)*
- * Offseason or practice squad member only

Career NFL statistics
- Fumble recoveries: 1
- Stats at Pro Football Reference

Tony Mayes (born May 19, 1964) is an American former professional football player who was a defensive back in the National Football League (NFL). He played for the St. Louis Cardinals in 1987. He played college football for the Kentucky Wildcats and was selected by the Tampa Bay Buccaneers in the fifth round of the 1987 NFL draft.
