= Zaven Yaralian =

American football coach (born 1952)

Personal information
- Born: February 5, 1952 (age 74); Kessab, Syria

Career information
- High school: Inglewood (CA)
- College: Nebraska

Career history
- Washington State (1977) Defensive backs coach; Missouri (1978–1982) Defensive backs coach; Florida (1983–1984) Defensive backs coach; Florida (1985–1987) Defensive coordinator; Colorado (1988–1989) Defensive backs coach; Chicago Bears (1990–1992) Defensive backs coach; New York Giants (1993–1996) Defensive backs coach; New Orleans Saints (1997–1999) Defensive coordinator; Denver Broncos (2001) Assistant to the head coach
- Coaching profile at Pro Football Reference

Zaven Yaralian (born February 5, 1952) is an American football coach. He served as an assistant coach for the Chicago Bears, New York Giants, New Orleans Saints and Denver Broncos.

== Personal life ==
Yaralkian and his wife Lorraine have two children, Blake and Garret.
