= Anthony Nash =

Anthony Nash may refer to:

- Anthony Nash (hurler) (born 1984), Irish hurler
- Tony Nash (actor)
- Tony Nash (bobsledder) (1936–2022), British bobsledder
- Tony Nash (rugby league) (fl. 1942), Australian rugby league player
