= Steve Rehage =

American gridiron football player (born 1963)

No. 31, 4 (CFL)
- Position: Cornerback

Personal information
- Born: November 6, 1963 (age 63); New Orleans, Louisiana, U.S.
- Listed height: 6 ft 1 in (1.85 m)
- Listed weight: 190 lb (86 kg)

Career information
- High school: Alfred Bonnabel
- College: LSU
- NFL draft: 1987: undrafted

Career history
- New York Giants (1987); Ottawa Rough Riders (1988)

Career NFL statistics
- Games played: 3
- Stats at Pro Football Reference

Stephen Michael Rehage (born November 6, 1963) is an American former professional football player who was a cornerback for one season with the New York Giants of the National Football League (NFL). He played college football for the LSU Tigers.

== Early life ==
Steve Rehage was born on November 6, 1963, in New Orleans, Louisiana. He went to high school at Alfred Bonnabel High School.

== College career ==
Rehage went to college at Louisiana State University. He played 11 games each year for the Tigers from 1983 to 1986. He had 4 interceptions in 1985.

== Professional career ==
New York Giants

In 1987 he was a replacement player for the New York Giants. He played in three games and had one interception.

Ottawa Rough Riders

He played 7 games for the Ottawa Rough Riders in 1988. He had one interception.
