= Mario Perry =

American football player (born 1963)

No. 84
- Position: Tight end

Personal information
- Born: December 20, 1963; Chicago, Illinois, U.S.
- Listed height: 6 ft 6 in (1.98 m)
- Listed weight: 240 lb (109 kg)

Career information
- High school: Hillcrest (Memphis, Tennessee)
- College: Ole Miss
- NFL draft: 1987: 11th round, 294th overall pick

Career history
- Cleveland Browns (1987)*; Los Angeles Raiders (1987)
- * Offseason or practice squad member only

Career NFL statistics
- Receptions: 1
- Receiving yards: 3
- Touchdowns: 1
- Stats at Pro Football Reference

Romauro Ron Perry (born December 20, 1963) is an American former professional football player who was a tight end for one season with the Los Angeles Raiders of the National Football League (NFL). He played college football for the Ole Miss Rebels and was selected by the Raiders in the 11th round of the 1987 NFL draft with the 294th overall pick. He scored the lone touchdown of his NFL career on a three-yard reception from quarterback Vince Evans against the Denver Broncos in Week 5 of the 1987 season.
